= Allen Carter =

American football player (born 1952)

No. 21
- Positions: Running back, kick returner

Personal information
- Born: December 12, 1952 (age 73); Pomona, California, U.S.
- Listed height: 5 ft 11 in (1.80 m)
- Listed weight: 208 lb (94 kg)

Career information
- High school: Bonita (La Verne, California)
- College: USC
- NFL draft: 1975: 4th round, 86th overall pick

Career history
- New England Patriots (1975–1976)

Awards and highlights
- 2× National champion (1972, 1974)

Career NFL statistics
- Rushing attempts: 22
- Rushing yards: 95
- Total TDs: 1
- Stats at Pro Football Reference

Wayne Allen Carter (born December 12, 1952) is an American former professional football player who was a running back for the New England Patriots of the National Football League (NFL) in 1975 and 1976. He played college football for the USC Trojans.

== High school ==
Carter had outstanding high school football career at Bonita High School, where he was considered by some observers to be one of the top high school running backs of the time. He ran for 4,388 yards with 70 touchdowns during his three years on the Bonita varsity team, breaking records set by Glenn Davis in the process. As a senior, Carter was named the CIF-Southern Section's 3-A Division Player of the Year. Carter also participated in track and field in high school, and was the California state champion in the 100-meter dash in his junior year, running the race in 9.7 seconds.

== College ==
After high school, Carter signed to play college ball at the University of Southern California. In his freshman year, Allen led the USC freshman team in rushing. But as a sophomore in 1972, he suffered leg injuries and fell behind Anthony Davis and Rod McNeill on the varsity team at tailback. Davis became the team's star tailback for the next three years, with Carter playing behind him. Carter rushed 30 times for 226 yards, a 7.5 average, that season, as USC won the National Championship. As a junior in 1973, again playing behind Davis and McNeill, Carter rushed 43 times for 294 yards, a 6.8 yard average. As a senior in 1974, Allen played behind only Davis, and rushed for 580 yards on 111 carries, a 5.2 average, helping USC to another National Championship. Allen played a key role in USC's victory in the 1975 Rose Bowl Game, rushing for 75 yards after Davis suffered a rib injury in the first half of the game.

== Professional career ==
Carter was selected by the Patriots in the fourth round with the 86th overall pick of the 1975 NFL draft. The Patriots had received the pick from the Cleveland Browns in exchange for wide receiver Reggie Rucker. With the Patriots he was reunited with fellow running back Sam Cunningham, who had been his fullback on the 1972 USC team.

Carter was primarily a kick returner for the 1975 Patriots. He rushed only 22 times for 95 yards, a 4.3 yard average. He also caught 2 passes for 39 yards. He had a successful season as a kickoff return man, returning 32 kicks for 879 yards and a 27.5 yards per return average. His 32 returns ranked 7th in the NFL, his 879 yards ranked 6th and his 27.5 yard average ranked 3rd. In the final game of the season against the Baltimore Colts, Carter returned the opening kickoff 99 yards for a touchdown. His 99-yard return was the 2nd longest in the NFL that season. It also set a Patriots record for longest kickoff return, which was broken by Raymond Clayborn's 100-yard return in 1977. The touchdown was also enough to tie the league lead for kickoff return touchdowns for the season.

In the first game of the 1976 season, Carter saw little action due to a knee injury. He returned just one kickoff for 19 yards and did not have any rushes or receptions. He was waived by the Patriots the following week and was signed by the New York Jets. He was waived by the Jets shortly thereafter.

== Post-retirement ==
After his football career ended, Carter became a teacher, activities director, and assistant football coach at Anaheim High School. He later became Anaheim's varsity football head coach, during which time Carter coached future NFL running back Reuben Droughns.
