= Dan Fouts =

American football player (born 1951)

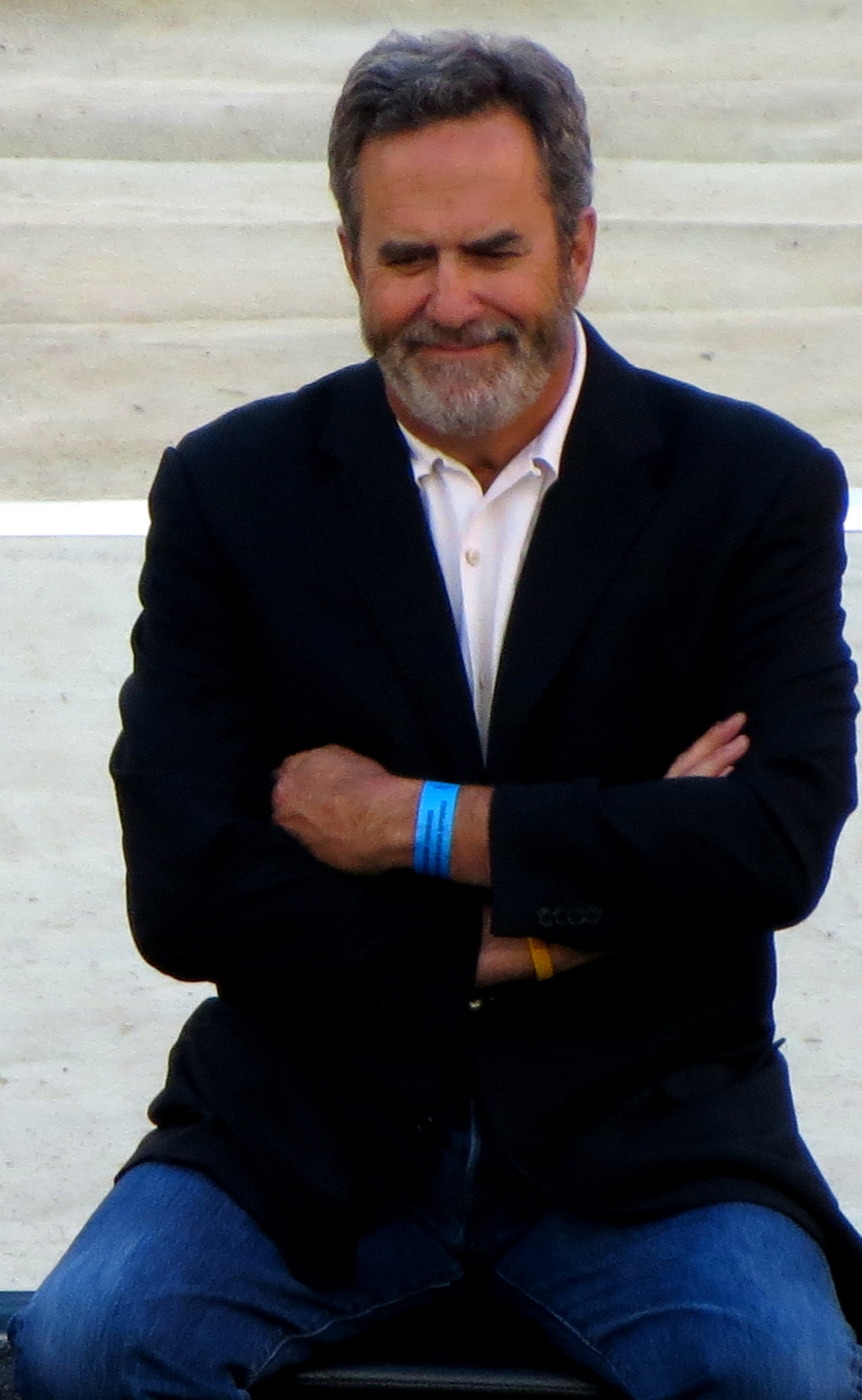
- Fouts in 2012

No. 14
- Position: Quarterback

Personal information
- Born: June 10, 1951 (age 75); San Francisco, California, U.S.
- Listed height: 6 ft 3 in (1.91 m)
- Listed weight: 204 lb (93 kg)

Career information
- High school: Marin Catholic; (Kentfield, California); St. Ignatius; (San Francisco)
- College: Oregon (1969–1972)
- NFL draft: 1973: 3rd round, 64th overall pick

Career history
- San Diego Chargers (1973–1987)

Awards and highlights
- NFL Offensive Player of the Year (1982); 2× First-team All-Pro (1979, 1982); 2× Second-team All-Pro (1980, 1985); 6× Pro Bowl (1979–1983, 1985); 4× NFL passing yards leader (1979–1982); 2× NFL passing touchdowns leader (1981, 1982); NFL completion percentage leader (1979); NFL 1980s All-Decade Team; Joe F. Carr Trophy (1979); San Diego Chargers 50th Anniversary Team; Los Angeles Chargers Hall of Fame; Los Angeles Chargers No. 14 retired; First-team All-Pac-8 (1972)

Career NFL statistics
- Passing attempts: 5,604
- Passing completions: 3,297
- Completion percentage: 58.8%
- TD–INT: 254–242
- Passing yards: 43,040
- Passer rating: 80.2
- Rushing yards: 476
- Rushing touchdowns: 13
- Stats at Pro Football Reference
- Pro Football Hall of Fame

Daniel Francis Fouts (born June 10, 1951) is an American former professional football player who was a quarterback for the San Diego Chargers of the National Football League (NFL) throughout his 15-season career (1973–1987). After a relatively undistinguished first five seasons in the league, Fouts came to prominence as an on-field leader during the Chargers' Air Coryell period. He led the league in passing yards every year from 1979 to 1982, throwing for over 4,000 yards in the first three of these—no quarterback had previously posted consecutive 4,000-yard seasons. Fouts was voted a Pro Bowler six times, first-team All-Pro twice, and in 1982 he was the Offensive Player of the Year. He was elected to the Pro Football Hall of Fame in 1993, his first year of eligibility.

Fouts played college football for the Oregon Ducks, setting numerous school records. He was later inducted into both the Oregon Sports Hall of Fame and the University of Oregon Hall of Fame. He was a third-round draft pick by the Chargers in 1973. Fouts struggled during his first three seasons in the league. His form began to improve in 1976, but he was discontented over the direction of the team and the restrictions of the NFL's free agency rules so he refused to play during the majority of the 1977 season.

Early in 1978, Don Coryell became the head coach of the Chargers and he instituted the pass-oriented Air Coryell offensive scheme, allowing Fouts to throw the ball with unprecedented frequency. He led the NFL in passing yards for four straight years from 1979 to 1982 (still a consecutive-years record), and he became the first player in league history to throw for 4,000 yards in three straight seasons, breaking the NFL single-season record for passing yards each time. Fouts' performance was rewarded by six Pro Bowl selections (1979–1983 & 1985) and four All-Pro selections (first team in 1979 and 1982, second team in 1980 and 1985). In the strike-shortened 1982 season, he passed for 2,883 yards in only nine games, winning the Associated Press (AP) Offensive Player of the Year and Pro Football Writers Association (PFWA) NFL Most Valuable Player honors.

Fouts led the Chargers to three consecutive AFC West division titles – 1979, 1980 and 1981 – and a playoff appearance in 1982. He was the winning quarterback of the Epic in Miami, when he broke the league playoff single-game record by passing for 433 yards. The Chargers advanced to the AFC Championship Game twice during his career, but never reached the Super Bowl. Fouts was the first quarterback to be inducted into the Pro Football Hall of Fame without appearing in either the Super Bowl or an NFL championship game.

After retiring from the league, Fouts was a color analyst for NFL games on CBS television and Westwood One radio. He is the son of Bay Area Radio Hall of Famer Bob Fouts.

== Early life ==
Dan Fouts was born in San Francisco on June 10, 1951, to Julie and Bob Fouts, the fourth of five children. His father was a sports broadcaster who commentated for the San Francisco 49ers in the NFL for over 20 years. As a child, Dan acted as a stats-keeper for Bob and worked for the 49ers as a ballboy. One of his first sports heroes was John Brodie, the 49ers' starting quarterback at that time. At the age of 11, when Fouts asked his parents' permission to play football, they told him that he would have to be a quarterback, as he had shown a good throwing arm while playing Little League baseball. He played Pop Warner football for the Drake Junior Pirates, where his coach described him as an "outstanding quarterback" in 1964.

Fouts attended Marin Catholic High School, located just north of San Francisco in Kentfield, California, for his first two years of high school football and had his first starts as a sophomore in 1966. He temporarily lost his starting position after his play was described as "extremely jittery" by the local San Rafael Daily Independent Journal, but an end of season report from the same paper stated that he should improve with better protection. The team had a record of 0–6 and Fouts finished the season with nine interceptions and only one touchdown. While at Marin Catholic, he also played varsity basketball as a forward.

Fouts transferred to St. Ignatius College Preparatory, also in San Francisco, for his final two years of high school. Explaining the switch to St. Ignatius in 2013, he said, "My dad told me 'You're not going to get a scholarship at Marin Catholic; you're going to get it at St. Ignatius.'" In 1967, Fouts' junior year, St. Ignatius was the champion of the West Catholic Athletic League with a 6–0 record, and Fouts was named to the WCAL All-Star first-team. He nearly reversed his touchdown to interceptions ratio, with 16 touchdowns and two interceptions. St. Ignatius went 5–1 in Fouts' senior year but he passed much less as his team focused more on their running game.

== College career ==
Fouts was not a highly sought recruit when he accepted a scholarship offer from the University of Oregon to play for the Ducks in Eugene. It was the only offer from a major college that he received. Fouts did not play for the main Ducks team during his first year at Oregon (1969); instead he started for the freshman team, composed of first-year players.

In the 1970 season, he began as a backup to established passer Tom Blanchard. In the opening game, a 31–24 victory over California, Fouts came off the bench and threw for 166 yards and two touchdowns, including the game-winner in the final two minutes; Fouts and Blanchard combined to set a new Pacific-8 Conference (Pac-8) record with 424 passing yards that day. Fouts got his first chance to start two weeks later when Blanchard was out due to injury. He kept the role for the rest of the season and the Ducks finished 6–4–1. Fouts went on to set Oregon single-game records for the most attempts, completions and yards, and single-season records for completions and touchdowns. His 16 touchdowns ranked second in the Pac-8, while his 212.1 yards of total offense per game were tenth in the nation. United Press International (UPI) named him as an honorable mention in their season-ending all-coast team. The Salem Capital Journal described Fouts as a sophomore with "the poise of a senior".

Fouts entered the 1971 season as an established and highly rated starter. He missed two and a half games of the Ducks' 5–6 season due to knee ligament damage, but he still ranked third in the Pac-8 for passing yards. When Oregon replaced their head coach Jerry Frei at the end of the year, Fouts was one of seven players on the committee of fifteen who chose the replacement, Dick Enright.

Fouts broke the Oregon record for career passing yardage early in the 1972 season, which ended with a 4–7 record. In his last game as a Duck he threw a 65-yard touchdown pass and Oregon beat Oregon State for the first time in nine years. At the end of the season, Fouts ranked second in the Pac-8 for passing yards and touchdowns behind Mike Boryla of Stanford. The Capital Journal compared the two quarterbacks, stating that Fouts faced "trying conditions" with a relative lack of support on offense. He was named to the All-Pac-8 team as chosen by the conference's coaches, as well as the UPI All-Coast team and the Associated Press (AP) All-West Coast team. Fouts was invited to the East–West Shrine Bowl (which he missed due to a foot injury), the Senior Bowl, and the Coaches All-America Game (where he broke his collarbone on his first play from scrimmage).

At the end of his college career, Fouts' career passing yardage ranked No.1 in Oregon history, No. 2 in the Pac-8 and No. 7 in the NCAA. He set 19 Oregon records, including career passing yardage (5,995) and total offense (5,871), and he was inducted into the university's hall of fame as part of the inaugural 1992 class.

== Professional career ==
=== 1973–1978: Early career ===
==== 1973 season ====
Fouts was selected in the third round of the 1973 NFL draft by the San Diego Chargers; he was the sixth quarterback taken and 64th overall. At the time he was drafted, NFL scouts questioned Fouts' durability, arm strength and athleticism. He was brought in to back up one of his childhood idols, Johnny Unitas, who had joined the Chargers during the off-season after 17 years with the Baltimore Colts. Unsigned at the time, Fouts broke his collarbone in the Coaches All-America Game on June 23; the Chargers management had not wanted him to play in the game because of the risk of injury. Fouts missed the start of training camp while holding out for more money, (Note: On July 23, Fouts signed a three-year contract worth a total of $93,000, equivalent to $674,494 in 2025.) then missed the first three preseason games while recovering from his injury. Head coach Harland Svare described Fouts as "about a year behind" in August, and Fouts himself did not anticipate much play as a rookie.

Early in the 1973 season, Unitas sustained a career-ending shoulder injury which caused Fouts to see far more play as a rookie than expected. His first appearance came in week 4, when he entered a game at Pittsburgh at the start of the second half with the Chargers trailing 38–0. Fouts threw his first career touchdown in the fourth quarter (a 13-yarder to Jerry LeVias), led two further touchdown drives, and the game finished 38–21. He made his first NFL start the following week, throwing two touchdowns in a 27–17 loss to the Oakland Raiders. United Press International described his performance as that of a "bona fide NFL quarterback." He struggled in his next game, where he was intercepted four times during a 41–0 home loss to Atlanta, with the Associated Press reporting that he "frequently threw off balance and into a crowd of defenders."

Fouts finished the season ranked twelfth by passer rating in the 13-team American Football Conference (AFC). He was benched in favor of Wayne Clark for four weeks late in the season as the Chargers struggled to a 2–11–1 record. Speaking in 1985, Fouts described the 1973 Chargers as a team in "turmoil, total disarray", and criticized the coaches for not letting him work with Unitas and benefit from his knowledge.

==== 1974 season ====
Unitas announced his retirement before the 1974 season, leaving Fouts to compete with rookie Jesse Freitas for the starting job. New head coach Tommy Prothro singled out Fouts as giving the only good performance during a preseason loss, and he began the regular season as the starter.

San Diego lost their first regular season game, but Fouts got his first career win in week 2, leading a 98-yard 4th quarter drive for the winning touchdown. The Chargers lost their next five games, culminating in a 24–14 loss to the Kansas City Chiefs in which Fouts threw two interceptions and lost a fumble, prompting his home fans to start chanting for Freitas to play. In the same game, Fouts argued with wide receiver Harrison Davis, who he felt did not try hard enough to prevent an interception of an underthrown ball. Davis commented to the media, "Not much I could do about it ... Fouts can yell, that's his privilege, but it was a bad pass." Fouts said, "He's got to fight for the ball. That's gold out there." He threw four touchdowns the following week and continued to start until week 11, when a broken thumb ended his season.

Fouts ranked 11th in the AFC for passer rating. Freitas started the final three games and contributed two of the Chargers' five wins on the season; Prothro declined to comment when asked about his future intentions with regard to Fouts and Freitas, except to say that he had no plans to draft another quarterback.

==== 1975 season ====
Fouts and Freitas continued to vie for the starting position entering the 1975 season. Both struggled in preseason, and the Chargers added veteran quarterback Virgil Carter to their roster. All three quarterbacks played in the regular season opener against the Pittsburgh Steelers, generating only 145 yards of offense in a 37–0 defeat. Two weeks later, Fouts was the only quarterback Prothro used against the Oakland Raiders. His home crowd booed him when he was announced before kickoff and he completed 3 of 13 passes for 29 yards, no touchdowns and two interceptions, while getting sacked five times for the loss of 51 yards. The Chargers lost 6–0. San Diego went on to lose their first eleven games while Fouts missed playing time with a sore ankle and a concussion. He sustained a total of seven injuries during the course of the year. The Chargers avoided a winless season when Fouts led them to a pair of victories in December.

With only two touchdown passes all season, Fouts finished with the 12th best passer rating in the AFC. Through his first three seasons in the league, Fouts had thrown 16 touchdowns and 36 interceptions while completing less than half his passes. The following year, he said the Chargers had been running a "very basic, antiquated offense" in 1974 and 1975. Reflecting on his first three seasons in a 1983 interview, he added, "We really didn't have an offensive coordinator or quarterback coach, so I had to fall back on what I'd learned from John Robinson, my offensive coordinator at Oregon."

==== 1976 season ====
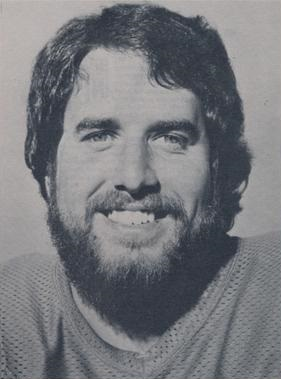
Fouts in 1976

Starting in February 1976, Fouts worked out three times a week with Bill Walsh, who spent that year as the Chargers' offensive coordinator. Fouts would later describe the sessions: "He showed me how to set up, how to hold the ball, where to throw and why. That's a large part of my success." He also praised Walsh for introducing a more complex offensive system.

Fouts and the Chargers began the 1976 season in good form; they reached a 3–0 record with a 43–24 victory over the St. Louis Cardinals where Fouts threw four touchdown passes. Fouts was the league's No. 1 rated passer at that stage, though the defenses he had faced were not highly regarded. His performances worsened as the season went on, and fans were calling for backup Clint Longley to have more playing time entering the week 10 game with the Denver Broncos. Fouts was again booed by his home crowd in the Broncos game, a 17–0 defeat. Longley did start one game late in the season, but was benched for Fouts after failing to produce any points in the first half. The Chargers eventually finished with a 6–8 record.

Fouts finished with the eighth-best passer rating in the AFC, and led the conference in both pass attempts (359) and completions (208). San Diego sports journalist Jack Murphy described 1976 as a year of "much growth" for Fouts, and the departing Walsh predicted that he would have a fine career in the league.

==== 1977 season: 125-day holdout ====
San Diego acquired quarterback James Harris from the Los Angeles Rams during the off-season, with head coach Tommy Prothro stating that he wanted depth at the injury-prone position. There was speculation in the media that Harris' contract was worth approximately $170,000, compared to Fouts' $82,500. The following month, Fouts was one of 17 players who testified against the NFL in an antitrust settlement. Fouts expressed a desire to leave San Diego, and complained about the new collective bargaining agreement which said that the Chargers had to only match the offer of another team to prevent him from leaving. Fouts was reportedly annoyed by Harris's acquisition by the Chargers, and by the size of Harris's contract, but Fouts himself said that he wanted to play in a Super Bowl, and that the Chargers were not of that caliber. He stated that he would retire if he was not allowed to leave San Diego. He also attacked Prothro as "the farthest thing from a head coach you'll ever find... he's snowing people into thinking he knows what he's doing."

Fouts refused to report to training camp in July and was placed on the reserve list by the Chargers the following month; Harris became the new starting quarterback. Owner Gene Klein stated publicly that he would not trade Fouts, and that he would not play in the NFL again if he refused to turn out for San Diego. Fouts filed a grievance against the Chargers in October, seeking to be granted free agent status by the NFL. On November 15, the NFL grievance committee rejected Fouts' attempt to become a free agent. Klein said that Fouts had been given bad advice by his lawyer, and would be welcomed back to the team. Fouts reported to the Chargers on November 17, 125 days late, having accrued $62,500 in fines. He declined to comment on his holdout to the press. Chargers player representative Pat Curran stated that the team welcomed Fouts back, suggesting that his criticisms of Prothro and the quality of his teammates were a "smoke-screen" to support his attempt to become a free agent.

The 1977 Chargers were a 5–5 team when Fouts returned, and they had recently lost Harris to injury. Fouts won praise from Prothro when he won his first two games back, and described the team as the best of his Chargers career. He lost the next two games, struggling in both. The Escondido Times Advocate said of the finale that Fouts was "his vintage horrid self of all his bad games of the past."

==== 1978 season ====
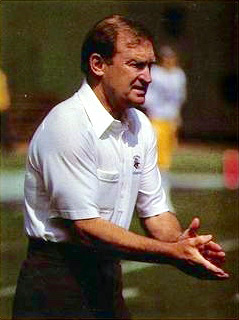
The arrival of head coach Don Coryell in 1978 spurred Fouts' transformation into a record-breaking quarterback.

Fouts signed a new five-year contract with the Chargers during the off-season, and was selected as the starter ahead of Harris. He sustained a jammed thumb early in the 1978 season and did not start in week 4 against the Green Bay Packers, instead coming off the bench and throwing two of the Chargers' five interceptions in a 24–3 defeat.

Prothro resigned after the Green Bay defeat with the team's record at 1–3; his replacement, Don Coryell, would be a key figure in Fouts' career. Coryell was an offensive-minded coach who favored the passing game. He later wrote of Fouts, "The first few times I saw him throw the ball, I knew that he would be our quarterback, and that he would be a great one." Recalling Coryell's first team talk, Fouts said, "I went home that day, and I had the biggest canary-eating grin on ... He talked about fun, passing, moving the ball, flying around the field, hitting people. All the things I wanted to hear."

San Diego lost three of Coryell's first four games, then won their next four to preserve a small chance of making the playoffs. Fouts missed the next game because of an ankle injury, and San Diego lost 23–0. Coryell, who had made few changes to the Chargers' offense up to that point, began to emphasize the passing game more during the last three games of the season. Fouts responded with a total of 917 yards and 9 touchdowns as the Chargers won all three, giving him seven consecutive victories as a starter. He passed for 369 yards in the season finale, tying Tobin Rote's franchise record.

Fouts finished with the third-best passer rating in the league (83.2) and the fourth-most touchdown passes (24). He had 2,999 passing yards, accounting for the bulk of San Diego's league-leading 3,375 yards. A later Chicago Tribune article noted the last three games of 1978 as the start of the "unprecedented passing attack" known as Air Coryell, which Fouts led for several years without further injuries.

=== 1979–1982: Four-time passing yardage leader ===
==== 1979 season ====
Fouts reached the playoffs for the first time in his career when San Diego went 12–4 in the 1979 season and won the AFC West. He finished the season with 4,082 yards passing, breaking Joe Namath's NFL record of 4,007. (Note: Namath's total came from 14 regular season games, while Fouts had 16.) He set an NFL record with four consecutive 300-yard games, while his total of six such games tied Joe Namath's league record. (Note: Joe Montana broke the consecutive 300-yard game record with five in a row in 1982.) With 332 completions out of 530 attempts, Fouts' completion percentage of 62.6% led the league, while his passer rating of 82.6 was the best in the AFC and third-best in the NFL. His leading receivers, John Jefferson and Charlie Joiner, were the first pair of teammates to each surpass 1,000 receiving yards in a season since 1968. (Note: Jefferson had 1,090 yards and Joiner 1,008. The New York Jets had the previous such pairing with George Sauer Jr. and Don Maynard.) Fouts said of his record-breaking season, "I'm in the game for one thing—to get to the Super Bowl. The records will come because of our style of play."

In the end of season awards, Fouts finished second behind Earl Campbell for both AP NFL MVP (outvoted 34–27) and AP Offensive Player of the Year (outvoted 39–34). He was named a Pro Bowler and an AP first-team All-Pro. Other organizations to select him as their All-NFL quarterback included UPI, Pro Football Weekly and the Professional Football Writers of America.

San Diego's return to the playoffs ended in disappointment when they lost 17–14 at home to the wildcard Houston Oilers. Fouts completed 25 of 47 passes for 333 yards, no touchdowns, and five interceptions. Fouts said after the game, "We just made too many mistakes, that's all. We didn't play very well and they did." It was revealed after the game that Houston defensive coordinator Ed Biles had managed to crack the code San Diego used to signal their offensive plays to Fouts, giving them prior warning of the coming plays and potentially accounting in part for Fouts' struggles. Fouts himself did not believe that the signals were stolen: "Anybody that says they're stealing signals is a liar. According to the stats, we got 500 yards of offense. If they were stealing signals, then they didn't do a very good job of it." (Note: The Chargers actually had less than 400 yards of offense.)

==== 1980 season ====
Fouts broke more records in the 1980 season when he led the Chargers to an 11–5 record and another divisional title. He broke the single-game passing yards franchise record he had shared with Rote in week 2, then improved on that total in weeks 6 and 7. The last of these was a 444-yard game against the New York Giants that prompted New York head coach Ray Perkins to say, "he may be the best quarterback there is." He set another franchise record with a 20-game streak of regular season games with at least one touchdown pass. Fouts improved on his NFL single-season record with 4,715 passing yards and he became the first quarterback with two 4,000 yard seasons. His totals for attempts (589), completions (348) and 300-yard games (8) were also NFL records. (Note: Dan Marino broke the 300-yard game record with nine in 1984.) His passing produced an unprecedented three 1,000-yard receivers, with Jefferson, Joiner and tight end Kellen Winslow all achieving the feat. (Note: Jefferson had 1,340 yards, Winslow 1,290 and Joiner 1,132.)

Fouts was again named to the Pro Bowl squad; he was a second-team AP All-Pro behind Brian Sipe of the Cleveland Browns. Joiner said of Fouts at this point, "Dan has definitely matured over the last four years. His quickness of release is better, he's improved at reading defenses, he's better at going to the receiver who's open."

San Diego again had home field advantage in the AFC playoffs, and hosted the Buffalo Bills in the divisional round. The Chargers trailed 14–13 with a little over two minutes to play, facing a 3rd and 10 at midfield; Fouts threw to little-used wide receiver Ron Smith for what would prove to be the game-winning touchdown. He finished with two touchdowns and 314 yards against a Bills defense that was known for being strong against passing offenses. The following week, San Diego hosted the Oakland Raiders with a place in the Super Bowl at stake. Fouts had a mixed first half, as he threw two touchdown passes to Joiner and two red zone interceptions. Joiner's second touchdown began a comeback attempt from 28–7 behind that fell short; Oakland won 34–27 despite Fouts' total of 336 passing yards. Fouts was described by a Gannett article as "deeply depressed" afterwards. He said, "the disappointment of not making the Super Bowl will hang heavy on my mind during the off-season."

==== 1981 season ====
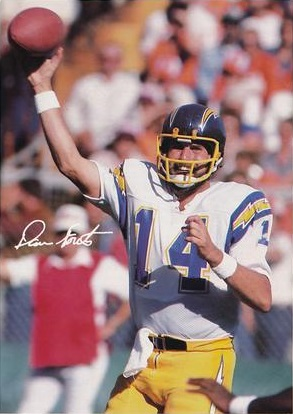
Fouts c. 1981

Fouts was again the league's passing yardage leader in the 1981 season, and the Chargers won their third straight AFC West title with a 10–6 record. He had to overcome the loss of one of his leading receivers, as Jefferson was traded after holding out for more money; San Diego brought in Wes Chandler from the New Orleans Saints as a replacement and their offense continued to statistically dominate the league. Fouts also had to overcome the fragility of the San Diego defense, which became much weaker after the trade of another holdout, defensive end Fred Dean. He completed a franchise record 15 consecutive passes during an opening day 44–14 victory over the Cleveland Browns. Another Charger record came in week 12 when he threw six touchdowns during a 55–21 win at the Oakland Raiders. Entering the final week of the regular season, San Diego needed another win over Oakland and a Denver loss to make the playoffs as division champions.

The NFL Players Association (NFLPA) ordered the Chargers to suspend Fouts before the regular season finale for non-payment of union fees. Fouts had not been a member of the NFLPA since 1976, when he left because of the Collective Bargaining Agreement (CBA) that he had opposed in court in 1977. The terms of the CBA required all players to pay union fees even if they were not members, with suspension compulsory if they refused. While he had paid under protest in 1978, Fouts refused to do so in subsequent seasons. Klein did not suspend Fouts as requested and he claimed that NFLPA executive director Ed Garvey was making a grandstanding move before the Chargers' potentially crucial final game, accusing him of vindictiveness and incompetence. Garvey said that Klein's failure to penalize Fouts could lead the NFLPA to seek a legal termination of the CBA, which would leave the players free to strike at any time. This possibility was averted when a pair of Charger fans volunteered to pay the outstanding amount of $1,122. Garvey accepted the fan payment, though he still took Klein to court for his initial refusal to carry out the suspension. Fouts received an award from the National Right to Work Committee for his stance against compulsory union membership; he explained that he was a supporter of free enterprise and free association, and stated that he would continue to refuse to pay the union. With the matter temporarily settled, Fouts played against Oakland; the Chargers won the game and clinched the division as Denver had lost the previous day.

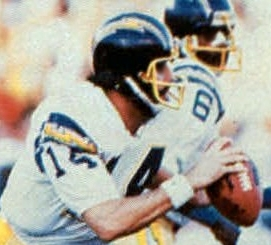
Fouts led the Chargers to a victory in the Epic in Miami 1981 AFC divisional playoff game, setting several postseason passing records.

Fouts improved on his own NFL records for passing yards with 4,802 while also extending his record with a third 4,000 yard season. He improved his own records for attempts (609) and completions (360). (Note: Dan Marino broke the yardage and completions records in 1984 (5,084 yards, 362 completions), the attempts record in 1986 (623 attempts) and the 4,000-yard season record with six throughout his career.) His 33 passing touchdowns led the league and set a franchise record. He again made the Pro Bowl, this time as a backup to Ken Anderson. San Diego led the league in points scored and yards gained. Fouts said "Nobody has really stopped us all year. This is the best year we've had yet."

San Diego faced the Dolphins in the divisional round, winning the Epic in Miami 41–38. The Chargers led 24–0 in the 1st quarter, then Miami recovered to lead 38–31. Fouts threw a game-tying touchdown pass with 58 seconds to play, then set up Rolf Benirschke's winning field goal with a 39-yard completion to Joiner in overtime. He set NFL playoff records for pass attempts (53), completions (33), and yards (433). (Note: Bernie Kosar broke the attempts and yardage records in 1986 (64 attempts, 483 yards), and Warren Moon broke the completions record in 1992 (36 completions).) Fouts described the Epic in Miami as the greatest game he'd played in. He said, "I don't know what's ahead but I can't imagine how it can get any more difficult than this one." The Chargers moved on to face the Bengals in Cincinnati for the AFC championship. The game became known as the Freezer Bowl, which was played in frigid and windy conditions; a gameday temperature of −9 °F (−22.8 °C) contrasting with the 88 °F (31.1 °C) weather in Miami the previous week. Fouts struggled to grip the ball and passed for only 185 yards as the Chargers were defeated 27–7. He left the field with icicles having formed in his beard. Coryell later recalled, "Dan couldn't even talk to me on the sidelines. He couldn't get the words out of his frozen mouth. I never felt sorry for another man like that."

==== 1982 season: Offensive Player of the Year ====
Fouts was again critical of the NFLPA when a players strike interrupted the 1982 season after two games. He attacked Garvey's demand for 55% of gross revenues as ridiculous and stated that the union should be lobbying for greater rights for free agents. Garvey's proposal would guarantee players certain wages based on their years of service, which Fouts felt would take away "the incentive to achieve greatness." He also said that Garvey was too fixated on strike action: "I'd like to see him negotiate, but he's obviously out-manned." Fouts was the only Charger to vote against supporting the strike at a team meeting. Teammate Linden King said of Fouts, "I understand where he is coming from, but I don't agree. It is a game of preservation. He is looking out for himself." Another teammate, Louie Kelcher, commented, "Dan has been saying this since 1977 ... Guys have to live with that." Despite his opposition to the strike, Fouts trained extensively with his teammates while it was ongoing. The strike lasted for 57 days, then play resumed with a truncated nine-game regular season.

Fouts tied his career-high with 444 passing yards as San Diego defeated the 49ers 41–37.

When the season restarted Fouts had consecutive 300-yard passing games, tying and then surpassing Unitas' NFL career record of 26 such games. (Note: Fouts finished his career with 51 300-yard games; Dan Marino broke this record with an eventual career total of 63.) Two weeks later, the Chargers defeated the 49ers 41–37 in San Francisco. Fouts tied his career high with 444 passing yards and threw five touchdowns. (Note: Contemporary sources list Fouts' game total against the 49ers as 450 yards. This was subsequently amended to 444 yards.) Fouts had numerous friends in attendance because he grew up nearby; after his retirement, he described the game as the most fun he had while playing. The following week, Fouts passed for 435 yards in a 50–34 victory over the Cincinnati Bengals, becoming the first player to post back-to-back 400-yard games. (Note: Ryan Fitzpatrick broke this record with three consecutive 400-yard games in 2018.) San Diego finished 6–3 and made the playoffs for the fourth consecutive season.

Fouts passed for 2,883 yards, leading the league for the fourth year in a row; (Note: Contemporary sources list Fouts' 1982 season total as 2,889 yards. This was subsequently amended to 2,883 yards.) this streak remains an NFL record as of 2023. His average yards per game of 320.3 was an NFL record, and would have put him on pace for 5,125 yards in a standard 16-game season. Fouts' passer rating was second only to Ken Anderson in the NFL, while his 17 touchdowns tied for first in the league. In the end-of-season awards, Fouts won the AP NFL Offensive Player of the Year Award with 43 of the available 80 votes, but finished runner-up in NFL MVP voting with 33 votes, two behind Washington kicker Mark Moseley. Fouts won a league MVP award from the PFWA, as well as the player-awarded Jim Thorpe Trophy. He was also voted to another Pro Bowl (where he was the game's co-MVP) and named an AP first-team All-Pro. After his Offensive MVP award, Fouts questioned the value of giving individual awards in a team sport, saying, "It's nice to be singled out, but they probably shouldn't give out any awards... Our society is so hung up on the star system and singling out people."

San Diego traveled to Pittsburgh for the first round of the playoffs. The Steelers led 28–17 in the final quarter before Fouts finished consecutive drives with touchdown passes to Winslow and the Chargers won 31–28. Fouts threw three touchdowns in total and passed for 333 yards. San Diego moved on to Miami for a playoff rematch that would pit the Chargers' top-ranked offense against the Dolphins' top-ranked defense. The Miami defense proved the decisive factor as they intercepted Fouts five times and allowed him only 191 yards. The resulting 34–13 defeat was the last playoff game of Fouts' career.

=== 1983–1987: Later career ===
==== 1983 season ====
Fouts' five-year contract with the Chargers expired on February 1, 1983, making him a free agent. He was unable to get offers from other teams, in part because of a rule that would require potential teams to give the Chargers two first-round draft picks in compensation. Fouts continued to criticize the NFLPA for the state of NFL free agency, describing it as "another example of how the players have been misled and misguided by Garvey and his troops". On April 7, the Associated Press reported that Fouts had scheduled a meeting with the newly-formed United States Football League (USFL) about the possibility of switching leagues. Klein announced on April 26 that Fouts had come to agreement with the Chargers, but reported ten days later that there had been a misunderstanding and Fouts had still not signed. The Chargers began making plans to start the season with backup quarterback Ed Luther promoted to the starting role. Fouts eventually did sign on June 29, saying that he had considered joining a proposed San Diego–based USFL franchise but returned to the Chargers because he wanted to win a Super Bowl. His agent, Howard Slusher, said that Fouts had been on the verge of signing a USFL contract but backed out because he felt he had unfinished work with the Chargers. Slusher reported that the six-year contract could potentially pay upward of $1 million per year, making it one of the most lucrative in pro football history up to that point.

During preseason, Fouts missed some playing time with an arch injury. More injuries followed once the 1983 season began: Fouts sprained a wrist against the Cleveland Browns in week 4 and was forced to leave a win at the New York Giants in week 5 with a bruised shoulder. He also played with a sore thumb. In week 7, a hit by Andre Tippett of the New England Patriots further injured Fouts' shoulder and caused him to miss over a month. This broke a string of 74 consecutive starts that stretched back to 1978. (Note: This streak consisted of 67 regular season games and 7 postseason games.) Luther filled in for him and struggled, with the Chargers winning only one of five games during Fouts' absence. After returning for three games, Fouts sustained a third shoulder injury and missed the season finale. He only played in ten games but was still voted to his fifth straight Pro Bowl after finishing with the third best passer rating in the AFC.

==== 1984 season ====
The 1984 Chargers began 4–2, with Fouts leading the offense to the top of the league in passing yards and total yards. They won only three games for the rest of the year while key players missed time with injuries. Fouts was shut out for his first time since 1979 in a week 9 game at the Seattle Seahawks, in which both Winslow and Chandler were unfit to play. A highlight came in week 12, when he set franchise records for attempts (56) and completions (37) while throwing 4 touchdowns and leading the Chargers to a 34–28 overtime upset of the Miami Dolphins, who had entered the game with an unbeaten 11–0 record.

Fouts started the first thirteen games of the season, before injuring his groin and missing the remaining three. His total of 3,740 yards was still the second highest in the AFC. Over the 1983 and 1984 seasons, San Diego averaged 26.2 points per game when Fouts played and 16.6 per game when he did not.

==== 1985 season ====
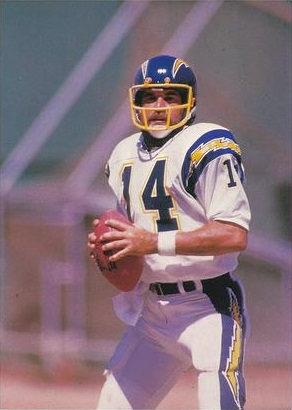
Fouts c. 1985

Fouts entered the 1985 season leading all active players for passing yards and touchdowns. A survey of three NFL scouts placed Fouts alongside Joe Montana and Dan Marino as the best quarterbacks in the league. San Diego had one of the league's weakest defenses but Fouts led them to a 2–1 start, passing for 1,002 yards and 9 touchdowns in the opening three games. He threw another touchdown on the Chargers' first possession of their week 4 game with the Cleveland Browns, but sustained knee ligament damage after hits on consecutive plays of their second series. Backup Mark Herrmann played the rest of the game but produced no points as the Browns won 21–7. Fouts underwent arthroscopic surgery to repair the injury later that day. Coryell commented, "He's an inspiration. We lost our whole key."

The injury was projected to keep Fouts out for three to six weeks, but he recovered slightly ahead of schedule. In the third game after the injury, San Diego were trailing 14–10 in the final quarter against the Minnesota Vikings before Fouts came off the bench and led a go-ahead touchdown drive, but the Vikings retook the lead and won 21–17. On his third start after returning, Fouts threw for 436 yards and 4 touchdowns in a 40–34 overtime win against the Raiders. It was the sixth 400-yard game of his career, a new NFL record. (Note: Dan Marino broke this record with a career total of thirteen 400-yard games.) Fouts started the final game of the Chargers' 8–8 season on the bench with a cracked fibula. (Note: Fouts had a one-play cameo appearance, coming on to hand the ball off while Herrmann was winded.) He passed for 3,686 yards despite the injuries, averaging over 300 yards per start. He was voted a second-team AP All-Pro behind Marino and made his sixth Pro Bowl. From 1983 to 1985, the Chargers were a combined 19–18 when Fouts started and 3–9 when he did not.

==== 1986 season ====
The 1986 season began well for the Chargers, who defeated Miami 50–28 with Fouts throwing 3 touchdowns and no interceptions. A week later, Fouts threw five interceptions in the second half of a 20–7 loss to the New York Giants. He continued to struggle as the season progressed, with 14 more interceptions in his next five games. Raiders cornerback Lester Hayes remarked that the Charger offense was "not the Dan Fouts show anymore," and that running back Gary Anderson was now the key player. Fouts continued to pick up injuries and he missed three games due to a pair of concussions and one more with a sore shoulder. San Diego disappointed as a team, finishing 4–12; Coryell lost his job midway through the season.

San Diego's new head coach Al Saunders preferred a more conservative style of offense, with more emphasis on Anderson and less on the 36-year-old Fouts attempting to throw long balls. Fouts has some success with the new system, with a higher completion percentage and fewer interceptions thrown late in the season. He posted his sixth 3,000-yard season, breaking an NFL record that he had shared with Sonny Jurgensen, and overtook Unitas for second place on the career passing yardage list. He said, "I'm honored to even be mentioned in the same sentence with Johnny Unitas, but I still feel I've got no business being there."

==== 1987: Final season and retirement ====
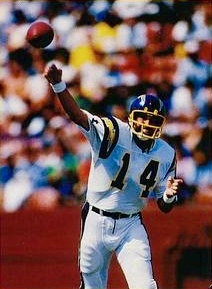
Fouts c. 1987

Fouts played one full season after Coryell's exit. He was involved in a preseason dispute with Chargers owner Alex Spanos. (Note: Spanos had bought the Chargers from Klein in 1984.) Spanos claimed he had met with Fouts to renegotiate his contract, which was for $750,000 in the 1987 season, and that Spanos had offered an increase to $1 million which Fouts had refused. He stated that he would be forced to trade Fouts unless the player agreed to play for $750,000. Fouts, who did not have his agent with him during the meeting, denied that he had been negotiating. He claimed that Spanos had "a PR campaign underway to set the stage for a trade", questioned the plausibility of him having refused a large pay rise and told the media that he intended to play for his contracted amount. Spanos accepted Fouts' assurances, saying "We're all happy." A Los Angeles Times article speculated that Spanos had actually been trying to persuade Fouts to take a higher salary in 1987 and then retire, foregoing his contracted $750,000 for the 1988 season.

The 1987 season was interrupted by another players strike, which caused the week 3 games to be canceled and the following three weeks to feature teams made up largely of replacement players. While Fouts was not part of the players union and did not picket with his teammates, he nonetheless refused to play for the Chargers while the strike was ongoing, saying that he would be risking injury if he played behind an inexperienced offensive line. He led the Chargers in training five days each week with the sessions based on game plans prepared by San Diego's coaching staff for the opponents that the replacement Chargers were playing.

The replacements won all three of their games, so Fouts and the other regulars came back to a 4–1 team that stood first in the AFC West. Fouts threw for 293 yards and two touchdowns in his first game back, and San Diego beat the Kansas City Chiefs 42–21; he credited the team's practice regime during the strike for their quick start after it. Three further victories improved the Chargers' record to a league-best 8–1. They lost all six of their remaining games and missed the playoffs. Fouts played only briefly in the first of these defeats due to a calf injury, and missed the finale with a slightly torn rotator cuff. He tended to pass over shorter distances in Saunders' offensive system. Fouts' passer rating and completion percentage were both his worst since 1975, while his 10 touchdown passes were his fewest since 1977.

Fouts announced his retirement on March 24, 1988, at his home in Rancho Santa Fe. He cited the wear and tear on his body as the main reason. He was 36 years old at the time, and second only to Fran Tarkenton in terms of NFL career passing yards, trailing by about 4,000 yards having attempted 863 fewer passes. Fouts ranked fourth in career passing touchdowns with 254. Reflecting on his career, he said, "We had so much confidence in what we were doing and we had a lot of fun."

=== Legacy and playing style ===
Fouts threw for a total 43,040 yards and 254 touchdowns while starting 171 games over fifteen seasons in San Diego; he also rushed for 476 yards and 13 touchdowns. At the time of his retirement, Fouts was credited with 42 team records and 7 league records. San Diego found Fouts difficult to replace, making 14 quarterback changes in barely four seasons before settling on Stan Humphries as a long-term starter during the 1992 season.

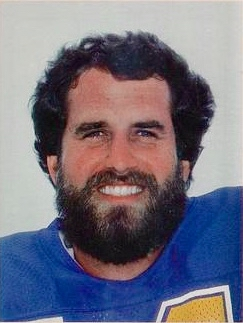
Fouts c. 1982

Fouts is remembered as the quarterback of the Air Coryell offense, which led the league in passing yards seven times in an eight-season span (1978–1983, 1985). Coryell described Fouts as a superior quarterback, writing "He had quick feet and could get back and make decisions. He wasn't afraid to pull the trigger and let the ball go." Fouts was able to make up to five reads before deciding on a pass target. His accuracy and quick decision making compensated for his unexceptional arm strength. Fouts rarely used the shotgun formation; he felt that he was more able to read defenses at the line. After taking the snap, he would drop back a shorter distance than most quarterbacks and often delay until the last second to give his receivers time to get open; both tendencies led him to take a number of hits throughout his career. Walsh, who went on to be a Hall of Fame head coach after leaving San Diego, said "Dan Fouts had a cool, steel-like nerve and courage ... He took a lot of beatings, a lot of pounding, but continued to play, hurt or otherwise. He played more physical football than anybody on his team, including the linebackers".

Fouts was noted for his aggressive leadership, and he would often berate teammates who failed to perform. He wore a hat that read "MFIC" (Motherfucker in charge), which was already evident to the team. "He knew it, we knew it, everybody knew it," said Chargers teammate Hank Bauer. When Fouts was injured in 1983, Benirschke commented that the team lacked confidence, adding, "Dan's always been the guy. People might get mad at him, but they always knew he was doing it because he wanted to win." Winslow called Fouts "our leader, cheerleader and quarterback all in one." After his playing career, Fouts lamented, "I wish I’d been kinder to my teammates".

The Chargers retired his No. 14 jersey during a ceremony at Jack Murphy Stadium on November 27, 1988, during halftime of a game against San Francisco. At the time, he was the only Charger to have his number retired. (Note: Ron Mix had his No. 74 retired in 1969 but un-retired later.) He was further honored when the San Diego Hall of Champions placed him in the Breitbard Hall of Fame in 1989. Fouts was enshrined in the Pro Football Hall of Fame in 1993, his first year of eligibility. Later that year, he was inducted into the Chargers Hall of Fame, together with Joiner. In 1999, he was ranked number 92 on The Sporting News' list of the 100 Greatest Football Players. He was one of the twenty quarterbacks listed as finalists for the NFL 100th Anniversary All-Time Team, though he was not among the ten who made the team. In 2009, Fouts received more votes than any other Charger during fan voting for their 50th anniversary team.

Fouts frequently credits Coryell for his success. Speaking in 1987, Fouts said, "You wouldn't be talking to me right now if it wasn't for Don, I'd be so far away from this. He meant everything. He made me." He credited three assistant coaches: Robinson from Oregon, Joe Gibbs, and Ernie Zampese from the Chargers. When Fouts was inducted into the Pro Football Hall of Fame, he chose Coryell to present him. Fouts considered strong line play to be another important factor in San Diego's offense and would buy his linemen dinner if they kept him from being sacked during a game. (Note: The starting linemen during Fouts' playoff seasons were Billy Shields, Doug Wilkerson, Don Macek, Ed White and Russ Washington.)

The Chargers never went to the Super Bowl under Fouts; he frequently appears on lists of the best quarterbacks not to win a Super Bowl or play in one. The San Diego defense was often blamed for their failure to win a title during Fouts career; a strong unit before the trade of Fred Dean early in the 1981 season, the defense was among the league's worst for the next five years. (Note: Dean won two Super Bowls with the San Francisco 49ers. "I can't say how much it affected us, because we did make it to the AFC championship game," said Chargers' All-Pro defensive lineman Gary "Big Hands" Johnson of the loss of Dean. "But I could say if we had more pass rush from the corner, it might've been different." U-T San Diego in 2013 called the trade "perhaps the biggest blunder in franchise history.") Overall, the defense rated in the bottom quarter of the NFL in 10 of Fouts' 15 seasons in the league. Fouts was the first quarterback to be inducted into the Hall of Fame with no appearances in a title game (Super Bowl or the NFL championship game). He expressed the hope that others would follow, saying "The Super Bowl is what you play for, but it is not your career, and not how you should be judged."

== Career statistics ==
=== NFL ===
Legend
	NFL Offensive Player of the Year
	Led the league
**Bold**	Career high

==== Regular season ====
Year	Team	Games			Passing										Rushing					Sacked		Fum
Year	Team	GP	GS	Record	Cmp	Att	Pct	Yds	Y/A	Y/G	Lng	TD	Int	Rtg	Att	Yds	Y/A	Lng	TD	Sck	SckY	Fum
1973	SD	10	6	0–5–1	87	194	44.8	1,126	5.8	112.6	69	6	13	46.0	7	32	4.6	16	0	14	129	2
1974	SD	11	11	3–8	115	237	48.5	1,732	7.3	157.5	75	8	13	61.4	19	63	3.3	16	1	12	99	4
1975	SD	10	9	2–7	106	195	54.4	1,396	7.2	139.6	57	2	10	59.3	23	**170**	**7.4**	**32**	**2**	25	197	3
1976	SD	14	13	5–8	208	359	57.9	2,535	7.1	181.1	**81**	14	15	75.4	18	65	3.6	13	0	**39**	220	8
1977	SD	4	4	2–2	69	109	**63.3**	869	8.0	217.3	67	4	6	77.4	6	13	2.2	11	0	10	77	4
1978	SD	15	14	9–5	224	381	58.8	2,999	7.9	199.9	55	24	20	83.0	20	43	2.2	22	**2**	22	130	10
1979	SD	16	16	**12–4**	332	530	62.6	4,082	7.7	255.1	65	24	**24**	82.6	**26**	49	1.9	26	**2**	28	195	**13**
1980	SD	16	16	11–5	348	589	59.1	4,715	8.0	294.7	65	30	**24**	84.7	23	15	0.7	9	**2**	32	210	11
1981	SD	16	16	10–6	**360**	**609**	59.1	**4,802**	7.9	300.1	67	**33**	17	90.6	22	56	2.5	13	0	19	134	9
1982	SD	9	9	6–3	204	330	61.8	2,883	8.7	**320.3**	44	17	11	**93.3**	9	8	0.9	9	1	12	94	2
1983	SD	10	10	5–5	215	340	63.2	2,975	**8.8**	297.5	59	20	15	92.5	12	−5	−0.4	3	1	14	107	5
1984	SD	13	13	6–7	317	507	62.5	3,740	7.4	287.7	61	19	17	83.4	12	–29	−2.4	3	0	29	**228**	8
1985	SD	14	12	7–5	254	430	59.1	3,638	8.5	259.9	75	27	20	88.1	11	−1	−0.1	7	0	18	135	**13**
1986	SD	12	12	3–9	252	430	58.6	3,031	7.0	252.6	65	16	22	71.4	4	−3	−0.8	0	0	21	173	4
1987	SD	11	10	5–5	206	364	56.6	2,517	6.9	228.8	46	10	15	70.0	12	0	0.0	2	**2**	24	176	10
Career		181	171	86−84−1	3,297	5,604	58.8	43,040	7.7	237.8	81	254	242	80.2	224	476	2.1	32	13	319	2,304	106

==== Postseason ====
Year	Team	Games			Passing										Rushing					Sacked		Fum
Year	Team	GP	GS	Record	Cmp	Att	Pct	Yds	Y/A	Y/G	Lng	TD	Int	Rtg	Att	Yds	Y/A	Lng	TD	Sck	SckY	Fum
1979	SD	1	1	0–1	25	47	53.2	333	7.1	**333.0**	34	0	**5**	36.3	0	0	—	0	0	2	16	0
1980	SD	2	2	**1–1**	44	**82**	53.7	**650**	**7.9**	325.0	**55**	**4**	3	80.8	**3**	−4	−1.3	2	0	**4**	26	0
1981	SD	2	2	**1–1**	**48**	81	**59.3**	618	7.6	309.0	47	**4**	3	**84.3**	**3**	**16**	**5.3**	**8**	0	**4**	**30**	**1**
1982	SD	2	2	**1–1**	42	76	55.3	524	6.9	262.0	33	**4**	**5**	67.0	2	3	1.5	3	0	3	23	0
Career		7	7	3–4	159	286	55.6	2,125	7.4	303.6	55	12	16	70.0	8	15	1.9	8	0	13	95	1

=== College ===
Year	Team	Passing							
Year	Team	Cmp	Att	Pct	Yds	Avg	TD	Int	Rtg
1970	Oregon	188	361	52.1	2,390	6.6	16	24	109.0
1971	Oregon	123	247	49.8	1,564	6.3	9	11	106.1
1972	Oregon	171	348	49.1	2,041	5.9	12	19	98.9
Career		482	956	50.4	5,995	6.3	37	54	104.6

== Career highlights ==
=== Awards and honors ===
NFL

- AP Offensive Player of the Year (1982)
- PFWA NFL MVP (1982)
- NEA NFL MVP (1982)
- 2× First-team Associated Press All-Pro (1979, 1982)
- 2× Second-team Associated Press All-Pro (1980, 1985)
- 6× Pro Bowl (1979, 1980, 1981, 1982, 1983, 1985)
- Pro Bowl MVP (1982)
- 4× NFL passing yards leader (1979–1982)
- 2× NFL passing touchdowns leader (1981–1982)
- NFL 1980s All-Decade second team
- San Diego Chargers 50th Anniversary Team
- Los Angeles Chargers Hall of Fame inductee (1993) (Note: The Chargers relocated to Los Angeles in 2017.)
- Los Angeles Chargers No. 14 retired (1988)
- Breitbard Hall of Fame (1989)
- Pro Football Hall of Fame inductee (1993)

College

- All-Pacific-8 team (1972)
- AP All-West Coast team (1972)
- UPI All-Coast team (1972)
- Oregon Ducks Hall of Fame (1992)
- Oregon Sports Hall of Fame (1992)

=== Records ===
==== NFL records ====
The 2023 NFL Record & Fact Book credits Fouts with two NFL records.

- Most consecutive seasons leading league, passing yards: 4 (1979–1982)
- Most consecutive 300-yard passing games, postseason: 4 (1979–1981)

==== Chargers records ====
The Los Angeles Chargers 2023 Media Guide credits Fouts with 15 franchise records.

- Most seasons leading league, pass attempts: 2 (1980–1981; tied with John Hadl)
- Most seasons leading league, pass completions: 2 (1980–1981; tied with John Hadl)
- Most seasons leading league, completion percentage: 1 (1979; tied with three others)
- Most seasons leading league, passing yards: 4 (1979–1982)
- Most seasons leading league, passing touchdowns: 2 (1981–1982; tied with John Hadl)
- Most touchdown passes, game: 6 (week 12, 1981)
- Most interceptions thrown, career: 242
- Highest passer rating, game: 157.1 (week 1, 1981)
- Most pass attempts, playoff game: 53 (divisional playoffs, 1981)
- Most pass completions, playoff game: 33 (divisional playoffs, 1981)
- Most passing yards, playoff game: 433 (divisional playoffs, 1981)
- Most 300-yard passing games, playoffs, career: 5
- Most 400-yard passing games, playoffs, career: 1
- Most interceptions thrown, playoffs, career: 16
- Most interceptions thrown, playoffs, game: 5 (twice: divisional playoffs, 1979 and second round, 1982)

== Broadcasting ==
=== Television ===
When he announced his retirement, Fouts stated his desire to work as a commentator, starting with the 1988 season. He had briefly worked as a journalist during his career, when he covered Super Bowl XX for USA Today and the San Diego NBC television outlet. Fouts did an audition tape for CBS, working with Dick Stockton, and he officially joined the NFL on CBS team as an analyst in March of that year. Over the course of the next six seasons, he was primarily partnered with Verne Lundquist. CBS were outbid by Fox and lost their NFL coverage rights in 1994. Fouts then switched to the CBS-affiliated KPIX-TV in his hometown of San Francisco, where he worked as the sports director and a sports anchor. In 1997, Fouts returned to network television as an analyst, this time working college football games for ABC Sports alongside play-by-play man Brent Musburger.

In 2000, Fouts moved into a commentary role on ABC's Monday Night Football, alongside anchor Al Michaels and comedian Dennis Miller. He had a three-year contract, but ABC dropped both Fouts and Miller from the show in 2002 after only two seasons. Fouts stayed with ABC, returning to college football and working alongside veteran announcer Keith Jackson. After Jackson's retirement from ABC in 2006, Fouts partnered with Tim Brant.

ABC declined to renew the contracts of either Fouts or Brant in 2008. It was reported in USA Today later that year that Fouts was returning to CBS for NFL games, where he would work with a variety of play-by-play announcers including Don Criqui, Bill Macatee, and Dick Enberg. In 2009, he was moved to partner with Enberg as the number 3 broadcasting team for the NFL on CBS. Ian Eagle replaced Enberg as Fouts' partner the following season, and the new pair remained in the number three slot until 2014, when they were moved to the number two team behind Jim Nantz and Phil Simms (and later, Tony Romo). Eagle and Fouts were often called "The Bird and the Beard". While with CBS, Fouts covered Chargers preseason games carried throughout Southern California.

In April 2020, CBS did not renew Fouts' contract. As of 2026 he still provides televised color commentary for Chargers preseason games alongside Ian Eagle’s son, Noah Eagle.

=== Other media ===
In 1998, Fouts made his big-screen debut, portraying himself in the Frank Coraci-directed comedy The Waterboy, starring Adam Sandler. Fouts did color commentary for the football video game NFL GameDay 2004, released in 2003. He partnered with long-time announcer Enberg. During his second stint at CBS, Fouts called NFL games for Westwood One radio, including Super Bowl 50.

== Personal life ==
Fouts married his first wife Julianne Mehl, a public health major, in 1977. The pair met at the University of Oregon. They later divorced, and Fouts married event producer Jeri Martin in 1994. He has two children from his first marriage, and two from his second. His son from his first marriage, Dominic, died of colon cancer in 2012. The family set up the Dominic Fouts Memorial Cancer Fund, with Fouts as an adviser.

He lives with his wife in Oregon, the state of his alma mater, in a two-story home he had constructed from logs in the 1970s. The house is situated in the mountains near the city of Sisters.

Described as a private person away from football, Fouts enjoyed fishing, skiing, and racquetball during his playing career. He is an avid golfer who has appeared at numerous charity events.

== See also ==
- Bay Area Sports Hall of Fame
- List of National Football League annual pass completion percentage leaders
