= 1972 Washington State Cougars football team =

American college football season

1972 Washington State Cougars football
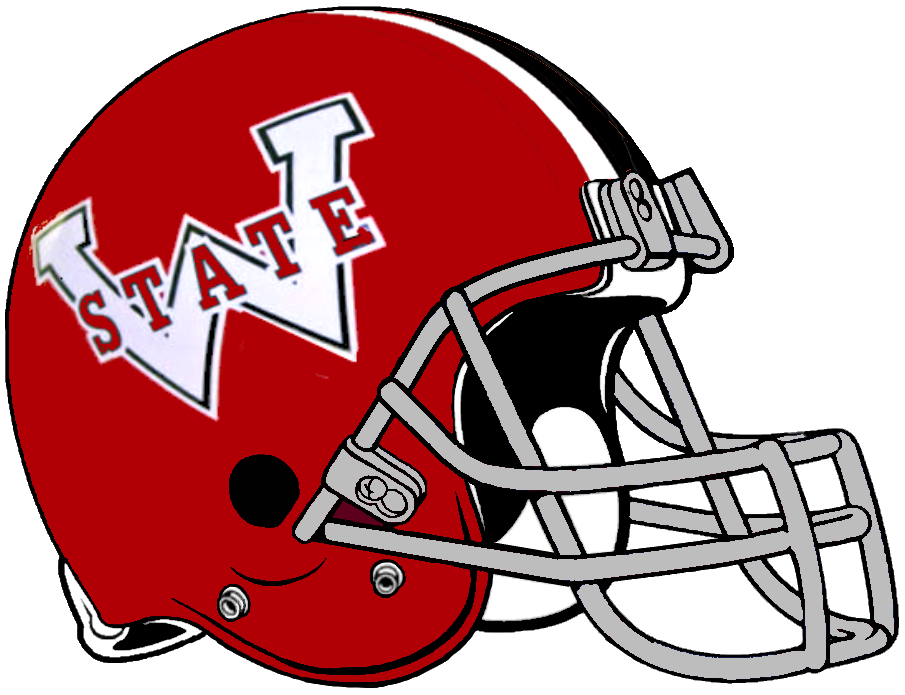
- Conference: Pacific-8 Conference

Ranking
- Coaches: No. T–17
- AP: No. 19
- Record: 7–4 (4–3 Pac-8)
- Head coach: Jim Sweeney (5th season)
- Offensive coordinator: Joe Tiller (2nd season)
- Defensive coordinator: Ray Braun (1st season)
- Captain: Bill Moos
- Home stadium: Martin Stadium, Joe Albi Stadium

1972 Pacific-8 Conference football standings
	Conf.					Overall
Team	W		L		T	W		L		T
No. 1 USC $	7	–	0	–	0	12	–	0	–	0
No. 15 UCLA	5	–	2	–	0	8	–	3	–	0
No. 19 Washington State	4	–	3	–	0	7	–	4	–	0
Washington	4	–	3	–	0	8	–	3	–	0
California	3	–	4	–	0	3	–	8	–	0
Oregon	2	–	5	–	0	5	–	6	–	0
Stanford	2	–	5	–	0	6	–	5	–	0
Oregon State	1	–	6	–	0	2	–	9	–	0
$ – Conference champion; Rankings from AP Poll

The 1972 Washington State Cougars football team was an American football team that represented Washington State University in the Pacific-8 Conference (Pac-8) during the 1972 NCAA University Division football season. In their fifth season under head coach Jim Sweeney, the Cougars compiled a 7–4 record (4–3 in the Pac-8, tied for 3rd), and outscored their opponents 274 to 241.

The team's statistical leaders included Ty Payne with 1,349 passing yards, Ken Grandberry with 833 rushing yards, and Brock Aynsley with 344 receiving yards.

Martin Stadium made its debut in late September and hosted four games; top-ranked USC was played in Seattle (at Husky Stadium), and the Apple Cup was at Joe Albi Stadium in Spokane.

Washington State won their first Apple Cup in four years over favored #17 Washington, dealing Husky quarterback Sonny Sixkiller a 27–10 loss in his final collegiate game. The Cougars finished in the top twenty in both major polls; the Pac-8 did not allow a second bowl team until the 1975 season.

== Schedule ==
Date	Time	Opponent	Rank	Site	Result	Attendance	Source
September 9		at Kansas*		Memorial Stadium; Lawrence, KS	W 18–17	33,500	
September 16		at California		California Memorial Stadium; Berkeley, CA	L 23–37	30,794	
September 23		at Arizona*		Arizona Stadium; Tucson, AZ	W 28–6	30,000	
September 30		Utah*		Martin Stadium; Pullman, WA	L 25–44	20,200	
October 7		Idaho*		Martin Stadium; Pullman, WA (Battle of the Palouse)	W 35–14	18,500	
October 14		at Oregon		Autzen Stadium; Eugene, OR	W 31–14	23,000	
October 21		Oregon State^{†}		Martin Stadium; Pullman, WA	W 37–7	22,100	
October 28		at No. 9 UCLA		Los Angeles Memorial Coliseum; Los Angeles, CA	L 20–35	29,950	
November 4		vs. No. 1 USC		Husky Stadium; Seattle, WA	L 3–44	46,500	
November 11	1:30 p.m.	No. 20 Stanford		Martin Stadium; Pullman, WA	W 27–13	20,500	
November 18		No. 17 Washington	No. 20	Joe Albi Stadium; Spokane, WA (Apple Cup)	W 27–10	34,100	
*Non-conference game; ^{†}Homecoming; Rankings from AP Poll released prior to the game; All times are in Pacific time

== Roster ==
1972 Washington State Cougars football team roster
Players
Coaches
Offense

Pos.	#	Name	Class
SE	45	Brock Aynsley	Sr
SE	49	Fritz Brayton	Jr
TE	80	Bob Engel	Jr
RB	44	Ken Grandberry	Jr
G	51	Mike Hill	Jr
SE	40	Greg Johnson	Jr
FB	39	Andrew Jones	So
TE	86	Tim Krause	Jr
OT	61	Bill Moos (C)	Sr
G	62	Steve Ostermann	So
QB	14	Ty Paine	Sr
QB	13	Chuck Peck	So
C	65	Geoff Reece	So
OT	75	Tom Wickert	Jr

Defense

Pos.	#	Name	Class
SS	36	Mike Carter	So
DT	71	Greg Craighead	Jr
CB	29	Tyrone Daisy	Sr
DE	79	Joe Daniels	So
FS	37	Eric Johnson	Jr
DE	85	Mike Johnson	So
LB	66	Gary Larsen	So
DT	88	Dennis Mitchell	Sr
CB	21	Morris Noble	Jr
LB	58	Tom Poe	Jr
SE	47	Bobby Redmond	Jr
DE	82	Jim Robinson	Sr

Special teams

Pos.	#	Name	Class
K	3	Joe Danelo	So
P	40	Greg Johnson	Jr

Head coach

- Jim Sweeney (5th year)

Coordinators/assistant coaches

- Ray Braun – (DC, LB)
- Joe Tiller – (OC, OL)
- Bob Simpson (TE, OL)
- Walt Cubley (DL)
- Keith Lincoln (QB, WR)
- Jack Elway (RB)
- Larry Donovan (DL)
- Bill Cords
- Ron Mims (DB)

Legend

- (C) Team captain
- (S) Suspended
- (I) Ineligible
- Injured
- Redshirt

== All-conference ==
Two Washington State players, both offensive linemen, were named to the all-conference team: senior tackle Bill Moos and sophomore guard Steve Ostermann. On the second team (honorable mention) was linebacker Clyde Warehime. Ostermann returned to the first team in 1973 and 1974.

== NFL draft ==
One Cougar was selected in the 1973 NFL draft.

Player	Position	Round	Overall	Franchise
Ty Paine	QB	9	225	New York Giants
