= Dick Enright =

American football player and coach (1935–2021)

Biographical details
- Born: May 20, 1935; Austin, Minnesota, U.S.
- Died: November 23, 2021 (aged 86); Fallbrook, California, U.S.

Playing career
- 1954–1956: USC
- Positions: Guard, tackle

Coaching career (HC unless noted)
- 1970–1971: Oregon (OL)
- 1972–1973: Oregon
- 1974–1975: Southern California Sun (OL)
- 1976–1977: San Francisco 49ers (OL)

Head coaching record
- Overall: 6–16 (college)

Richard Enright (May 20, 1935 – November 23, 2021) was an American football player and coach. He was the head coach at the University of Oregon in 1972 and 1973, with a record of 6–16.

== Early life ==
Enright first earned recognition as a standout tackle at Gardena High School, earning All-Marine League and All-CIF-L.A. City Section honors before graduating in 1953. Enright was a three-year letterman as a lineman at the University of Southern California.

After his college days at USC, he was a fifth round pick in the 1957 NFL draft (57th overall) and was briefly with the Los Angeles Rams, until an automobile accident ended his playing days.

Enright later returned to Gardena High School as a teacher and coach. In eight seasons, helped lead the Mohicans to seven Marine League titles and CIF-L.A. City Section football championships in 1964 and 1969.

== Oregon ==
Enright moved to the college ranks as the offensive line coach for the Oregon Ducks of the Pac-8 in 1970, under head coach Jerry Frei, and took over as head coach in February 1972, with a four-year contract starting at $22,500 per year. As head coach, Enright helped develop quarterback Dan Fouts, a senior during the 1972 season, and Norv Turner was the QB in 1973. With season records of 4–7 and 2–9, Enright was fired by athletic director Norv Ritchey in January 1974, with the university buying out the remainder of his four-year contract. He was succeeded by one of his assistant coaches, Don Read.

While head coach, Enright created the Daisy Ducks, an Oregon support club aimed at women. He claimed he created the organization because he was tired of complaints that men could not get their wives to attend football games because they did not understand the sport; the club proved popular. At the inaugural luncheon in August 1972, sophomore tight end Russ Francis did a "reverse striptease" to show the protective gear of a football player.

== WFL and NFL ==
After Oregon, Enright was hired by Tom Fears in April 1974 to coach the offensive line of the Southern California Sun of the short-lived professional World Football League. The league folded during the 1975 season, and Enright joined the San Francisco 49ers in 1976 as OL coach under new head coach Monte Clark, a college teammate.

== Return to High School ==
In 1977, Enright returned to Orange County to become a teacher and assistant football coach at Capistrano Valley High School, a public school in Mission Viejo, California. Three years later, he became head coach of the varsity football team and over the next eight seasons, the Cougars reached the playoffs eight straight times, earned or shared three straight South Coast League titles (1981-1983) and won the 1980 CIF-Southern Section Central Conference championship. Enright's tenure as head coach (1980-1987) was successful with 65 wins, 23 losses, and three ties. During this time, Enright's old USC alum and friend Marv Marinovich decided to have his son, quarterback Todd Marinovich transfer to Capistrano Valley to play under Enright. Todd, already a highly touted high school player, flourished and broke the all-time Orange County passing record and later the national high school passing record with 9,914 yards, including 2,477 his senior year.

Enright died on November 23, 2021, in Fallbrook, California, at the age of 86.

== Head coaching record ==
=== College ===
Year	Team	Overall	Conference	Standing	Bowl/playoffs
Oregon Ducks (Pacific-8 Conference) (1972–1973)
1972	Oregon	4–7	2–5	T–6th	
1973	Oregon	2–9	2–5	T–5th	
Oregon:		6–16	4–10		
Total:		6–16			
