= 1972 USC Trojans football team =

American college football season

1972 USC Trojans football

Consensus national champion Pac-8 champion Rose Bowl champion

Rose Bowl, W 42–17 vs. Ohio State
- Conference: Pacific-8 Conference

Ranking
- Coaches: No. 1
- AP: No. 1
- Record: 12–0 (7–0 Pac-8)
- Head coach: John McKay (13th season)
- Offensive coordinator: John Robinson (1st season)
- Captains: Sam Cunningham; John Grant
- Home stadium: Los Angeles Memorial Coliseum

1972 Pacific-8 Conference football standings
	Conf.					Overall
Team	W		L		T	W		L		T
No. 1 USC $	7	–	0	–	0	12	–	0	–	0
No. 15 UCLA	5	–	2	–	0	8	–	3	–	0
No. 19 Washington State	4	–	3	–	0	7	–	4	–	0
Washington	4	–	3	–	0	8	–	3	–	0
California	3	–	4	–	0	3	–	8	–	0
Oregon	2	–	5	–	0	5	–	6	–	0
Stanford	2	–	5	–	0	6	–	5	–	0
Oregon State	1	–	6	–	0	2	–	9	–	0
$ – Conference champion; Rankings from AP Poll

The 1972 USC Trojans football team represented the University of Southern California (USC) during the 1972 NCAA University Division football season. The Trojans won all twelve of their games, outscored their opponents 467–134, and were consensus national champions.

== Schedule ==
Date	Time	Opponent	Rank	Site	Result	Attendance	Source
September 9		at No. 4 Arkansas*	No. 8	War Memorial Stadium; Little Rock, AR	W 31–10	54,461	
September 16		Oregon State	No. 1	Los Angeles Memorial Coliseum; Los Angeles, CA	W 51–6	56,305	
September 23		at Illinois*	No. 1	Memorial Stadium; Champaign, IL	W 55–20	61,227	
September 30		Michigan State*	No. 1	Los Angeles Memorial Coliseum; Los Angeles, CA	W 51–6	63,934	
October 7	1:30 p.m.	at No. 15 Stanford	No. 1	Stanford Stadium; Stanford, CA (rivalry)	W 30–21	84,000	
October 14	1:31 p.m.	California	No. 1	Los Angeles Memorial Coliseum; Los Angeles, CA	W 42–14	56,488	
October 21		No. 18 Washington^{†}	No. 1	Los Angeles Memorial Coliseum; Los Angeles, CA	W 34–7	59,151	
October 28		at Oregon	No. 1	Autzen Stadium; Eugene, OR	W 18–0	32,000	
November 4		vs. Washington State	No. 1	Husky Stadium; Seattle, WA	W 44–3	46,500	
November 18		at No. 14 UCLA	No. 1	Los Angeles Memorial Coliseum; Los Angeles, CA (Victory Bell)	W 24–7	82,929	
December 2		No. 10 Notre Dame*	No. 1	Los Angeles Memorial Coliseum; Los Angeles, CA (rivalry)	W 45–23	75,243	
January 1, 1973		vs. No. 3 Ohio State*	No. 1	Rose Bowl; Pasadena, CA (Rose Bowl)	W 42–17	106,869	
*Non-conference game; ^{†}Homecoming; Rankings from AP Poll released prior to the game; All times are in Pacific time; Source:

== Rankings ==
Ranking movements Legend: ██ Increase in ranking ██ Decrease in ranking ( ) = First-place votes
	Week														
Poll	Pre	1	2	3	4	5	6	7	8	9	10	11	12	13	Final
AP	8	1 (13)	1 (28)	1 (28)	1 (36)	1 (34)	1(28)	1 (44)	1 (41)	1 (40)	1 (42)	1 (44)	1 (46)	1 (50)	1 (50)
Coaches	8	2 (11)	1 (14)	1 (20)	1 (22)	1 (21)	1 (22)	1 (32)	1 (31)	1 (27)	1 (31)	1 (31)	1 (31)	1 (35)	Not released

== Game summaries ==
=== At No. 4 Arkansas ===
Team	1	2	3	4	Total
• No. 8 Trojans	0	3	14	14	31
No. 4 Razorbacks	3	0	0	7	10

- Date: September 9
- Location: War Memorial Stadium, Little Rock, AR
- Game attendance: 54,461

Scoring summary
1	ARK	Bolton 27-yard field goal	ARK 3–0
2	USC	Rae 26-yard field goal	Tie 3–3
3	USC	Rae 5-yard run (Rae kick)	USC 10–3
3	USC	McNeill 18-yard run (Rae kick)	USC 17–3
4	USC	McNeill 3-yard run (Rae kick)	USC 24–3
4	ARK	Richardson 1-yard run (Bolton kick)	USC 24–10
4	USC	Cunningham 18-yard run (Rae kick)	USC 31–10

Tailback Rod McNeill, who sat out the previous year with a hip injury, led the Trojans with 117 yards on 28 carries while Mike Rae, a backup for two seasons, completed 18 of 24 passes for 269 yards and in the second half completed nine straight passes at one point in his first start.

=== Oregon State ===
Team	1	2	3	4	Total
Beavers	0	6	0	0	6
• No. 1 Trojans	7	13	17	14	51

- Date: September 16
- Location: Los Angeles Memorial Coliseum, Los Angeles, CA
- Game attendance: 56,305

Scoring summary
Q1	11:20	USC	McNeill 14-yard run (Rae kick)	USC 7–0
Q2	14:37	USC	McNeill 2-yard run (Rae kick)	USC 14–0
Q2	9:40	ORST	Morris 10-yard run (kick failed)	USC 14–6
Q2	7:35	USC	McNeill 5-yard run (kick failed)	USC 20–6
Q3	8:48	USC	Rae 20-yard field goal	USC 23–6
Q3	3:11	USC	Young 37-yard pass from Rae (Rae kick)	USC 30–6
Q3	1:32	USC	McKay 3-yard pass from Rae (Rae kick)	USC 37–6
Q4	4:19	USC	Haden 10-yard run (Rae kick)	USC 44–6
Q4	:55	USC	Washmara 1-yard run (Rae kick)	USC 51–6

- Anthony Davis 25 rushes, 206 yards

=== At Illinois ===
Team	1	2	3	4	Total
• No. 1 Trojans	7	13	15	20	55
Fighting Illini	7	7	6	0	20

- Date: September 23
- Location: Memorial Stadium, Champaign, IL
- Game attendance: 61,277

Scoring summary
Q1	4:26	ILL	Hayes 5-yard run (Rucks kick)	ILL 7–0
Q1		USC	Garrison 58-yard pass from Rae (Rae kick)	Tie 7–7
Q2		ILL	Uremovich 5-yard run (Rucks kick)	ILL 14–7
Q2		USC	Davis 2-yard run (Rae kick)	Tie 14–14
Q2	:21	USC	McKay 31-yard pass from Rae (kick failed)	USC 20–14
Q3		USC	Davis 2-yard run (McKay pass from Davis)	USC 28–14
Q3		ILL	Hayes 1-yard run (run failed)	USC 28–20
Q3		USC	Cunningham 2-yard run (Rae kick)	USC 35–20
Q4		USC	Sims 35-yard blocked punt return (Rae kick)	USC 42–20
Q4		USC	McKay 6-yard pass from Haden (Rae kick)	USC 49–20
Q4		USC	Carter 1-yard run (kick failed)	USC 55–20

=== Michigan State ===
Team	1	2	3	4	Total
Spartans	0	6	0	0	6
• No. 1 Trojans	14	7	3	27	51

- Date: September 30
- Location: Los Angeles Memorial Coliseum, Los Angeles, CA
- Game attendance: 63,934

Scoring summary
1	USC	Swann 92-yard punt return (Rae kick)	USC 7–0
1	USC	McNeill 8-yard run (Rae kick)	USC 14–0
2	USC	McKay 9-yard pass from Rae (Rae kick)	USC 21–0
2	MSU	Werner 1-yard run (pass failed)	USC 21–6
3	USC	Rae 20-yard field goal	USC 24–6
4	USC	Wood 25-yard interception return (Rae kick)	USC 31–6
4	USC	Moore 9-yard pass from Haden (kick failed)	USC 37–6
4	USC	Carter 21-yard run (Limahelu kick)	USC 44–6
4	USC	Swann 30-yard pass from Haden (Limahelu kick)	USC 51–6

=== At No. 15 Stanford ===
Team	1	2	3	4	Total
• No. 1 Trojans	13	7	3	7	30
No. 15 Cardinals	10	3	0	8	21

- Date: October 7
- Location: Stanford Stadium, Stanford, CA
- Game attendance: 84,000

Scoring summary
Q1		STAN	J. Ferguson recovered fumble in end zone (Garcia kick)	STAN 7–0
Q1		USC	Davis 8-yard run (Rae kick)	Tie 7–7
Q1		STAN	Garcia 49-yard field goal	STAN 10–7
Q1		USC	Cunningham 2-yard run (kick failed)	USC 13–10
Q2		STAN	Garcia 35-yard field goal	Tie 13–13
Q2		USC	Davis 1-yard run (Rae kick)	USC 20–13
Q3		USC	Rae 37-yard field goal	USC 23–13
Q4	5:40	USC	Swann 4-yard pass from Haden (Rae kick)	USC 30–13
Q4		STAN	Cross 30-yard pass from Boryla (Stone pass from Boryla)	USC 30–21

=== California ===
Team	1	2	3	4	Total
Golden Bears	0	0	7	7	14
• No. 1 Trojans	14	7	14	7	42

- Date: October 14
- Location: Los Angeles Memorial Coliseum • Los Angeles, California
- Game attendance: 56,488

Scoring summary
1	USC	Cunningham 1-yard run (Rae kick)	USC 7-0
1	USC	Rae 10-yard run (Rae kick)	USC 14-0
2	USC	Cunningham 1-yard run (Rae kick)	USC 21-0
3	CAL	Schmidt 3-yard pass from Cruze (Wersching kick)	USC 21-7
3	USC	Rae 8-yard run (Rae kick)	USC 28-7
3	USC	Young 40-yard pass from Haden (Rae kick)	USC 35-7
4	USC	Young 9-yard pass from Haden (Rae kick)	USC 42-7
4	CAL	Youngblood 1-yard run (Wersching kick)	USC 42-14

=== No. 18 Washington ===
Team	1	2	3	4	Total
Huskies	0	0	0	7	7
• No. 1 Trojans	7	13	14	0	34

- Date: October 21
- Location: Los Angeles Memorial Coliseum, Los Angeles, CA
- Game attendance: 59,151

Scoring summary
Q1	USC	Cunningham 2-yard run (Rae kick)	USC 7–0
Q2	USC	Davis 44-yard run (Rae kick)	USC 14–0
Q2	USC	Rae 22-yard field goal	USC 17–0
Q2	USC	Rae 26-yard field goal	USC 20–0
Q3	USC	Davis 14-yard run (Rae kick)	USC 27–0
Q3	USC	Cunningham 1-yard run (Rae kick)	USC 34–0
Q4	WASH	Fitzpatrick 10-yard run (Wiezbowski kick)	USC 34–7

=== At Oregon ===
Team	1	2	3	4	Total
• No. 1 Trojans	0	0	12	6	18
Webfoots	0	0	0	0	0

- Date: October 28
- Location: Autzen Stadium, Eugene, OR
- Game attendance: 32,000

Scoring summary
Q3	6:06	USC	Davis 48-yard run	USC 6–0
Q3	3:58	USC	Davis 55-yard run	USC 12–0
Q4	5:45	USC	Cunningham 2-yard run	USC 18–0

On a very rainy and cold day, the Trojans were held to their lowest score of the season.

=== Washington State ===
Team	1	2	3	4	Total
• No. 1 Trojans	3	14	7	20	44
Cougars	3	0	0	0	3

- Date: November 4
- Location: Husky Stadium, Seattle, WA

Scoring summary
1	USC	Rae 23-yard field goal	USC 3-0
1	WSU	Danelo 50-yard field goal	Tied 3-3
2	USC	Rae 11-yard run (Rae kick)	USC 10-3
2	USC	Davis 3-yard run (Rae kick)	USC 17-3
3	USC	Davis 6-yard run (Rae kick)	USC 24-3
4	USC	Davis 14-yard run (Rae kick)	USC 31-3
4	USC	Moore 1-yard run (kick failed)	USC 37-3
4	USC	Powell 21-yard interception return (Rae kick)	USC 44-3

=== At No. 14 UCLA ===
Team	1	2	3	4	Total
• No. 1 Trojans	10	7	7	0	24
No. 14 Bruins	7	0	0	0	7

- Date: November 18
- Location: Los Angeles Memorial Coliseum, Los Angeles, CA
- Game attendance: 82,929
- TV announcers (ABC): Chris Schenkel, Bud Wilkinson

Scoring summary
1	USC	Rae 32-yard field goal	USC 3–0
1	USC	Davis 23-yard run (Rae kick)	USC 10–0
1	UCLA	McAlister 2-yard run (Herrera kick)	USC 10–7
2	USC	McNeill 1-yard run (Rae kick)	USC 17–7
3	USC	Rae 7-yard run (Rae kick)	USC 24–7

Anthony Davis 25 Rush, 178 Yds

=== No. 10 Notre Dame ===
Team	1	2	3	4	Total
No. 10 Fighting Irish	3	7	13	0	23
• No. 1 Trojans	19	0	13	13	45

- Date: December 2
- Location: Los Angeles Memorial Coliseum, Los Angeles, CA
- Game attendance: 75,243

Scoring summary
1	USC	Davis 97-yard kickoff return (kick failed)	USC 6-0
1	ND	Thomas 45-yard field goal	USC 6-3
1	USC	Davis 1-yard run (Rae kick)	USC 13-3
1	USC	Davis 5-yard run (kick failed)	USC 19-3
2	ND	W. Townsend 5-yard pass from Clements (Thomas kick)	USC 19-10
3	USC	Davis 4-yard run (run failed)	USC 25-10
3	ND	Diminick 11-yard pass from Clements (Thomas kick)	USC 25-17
3	ND	Creaney 10-yard pass from Clements (pass failed)	USC 25-23
4	USC	Davis 96-yard kickoff return (Rae kick)	USC 32-23
4	USC	Davis 8-yard run (Rae kick)	USC 39-23
4	USC	Cunningham 1-yard run (kick failed)	USC 45-23

=== Vs. No. 3 Ohio State (Rose Bowl) ===
Team	1	2	3	4	Total
No. 3 Buckeyes	0	7	3	7	17
• No. 1 Trojans	7	0	21	14	42

- Date: January 1
- Location: Rose Bowl, Pasadena, CA
- Game attendance: 106,869

Scoring summary
1	USC	Swann 10-yard pass from Rae (Rae kick)	USC 7–0
2	OHST	Keith 1-yard run (Conway kick)	Tie 7–7
3	USC	Cunningham 2-yard run (Rae kick)	USC 14–7
3	OHST	Conway 21-yard field goal	USC 14–10
3	USC	Davis 20-yard run (Rae kick)	USC 21–10
3	USC	Cunningham 1-yard run (Rae kick)	USC 28–10
Q4	USC	Cunningham 1-yard run (Rae kick)	USC 35–10
Q4	USC	Cunningham 1-yard run (Rae kick)	USC 42–10
Q4	OHST	Bledsoe 5-yard run (Conway kick)	USC 42–17

- John McKay's 100th career victory
- Anthony Davis 157 Rush Yds
- Sam Cunningham set Rose Bowl scoring record (previous - 18 by three players)

== Roster ==
1972 USC Trojans football team roster
Players
Coaches
Offense

Pos.	#	Name	Class
QB	10	Pat Haden	So
QB	6	Mike Rae	Sr
RB		Allen Carter	So
RB	39	Sam Cunningham	Sr
RB	28	Anthony Davis	So
RB	27	Rod McNeill	Jr
WR	22	Lynn Swann	Jr
OT	77	Pete Adams	Sr
TE	89	Charle Young	Sr

Defense

Pos.	#	Name	Class
DE		John Grant
DT		Karl Lorch
DT		Greg Marderian
DT		Jeff Winans

Special teams

Pos.	#	Name	Class
K	6	Mike Rae	Sr

Head coach

- John McKay

Coordinators/assistant coaches

Legend

- (C) Team captain
- (S) Suspended
- (I) Ineligible
- Injured
- Redshirt

Roster: Undefeated University of Southern California football team: John McKay (Head Coach); Willie Brown (Assistant Coach); Anthony Davis #28 A.D.; Danny Reece #46; J.D. Winans #92; Jim Lee #96; Dale Mitchell #85; Rob Adolph #9; Rod McNeill; Chris Vella #81; Ray Rodriguez #52; Steve Fate #47; Manfred Moore #44; Ken Gray #37; J.K. McKay; Chris Chaney #15; Allen Carter #21; Charles Phillips #45; Charlie Hinton #26; Edesel Garrison; Mike Smith; Marvin Cobb #24; Monte Doris #72; Cliff Culbreath #54; Steve Riley; Charles Anthony #55; Wayne Fontes; James Givehand #88; Sam Cunningham #39; Pete Adams #77; Mike Rae; Karl Lorch #79; Mike Hancock #95; Glen Byrd #82; James Psycho Sims #41; George Follett #70; Bob McCaffrey; Mike Ryan #68; Eddie Johnson #11; Alan Pekarcik #48; Booker Brown; Allan Graf #61; Coach Marv Goux; and John Robinson

== NFL draft ==
Ten Trojans were selected in the 1973 NFL draft, with three in the first round.
