= Bill Moos =

American athletics director

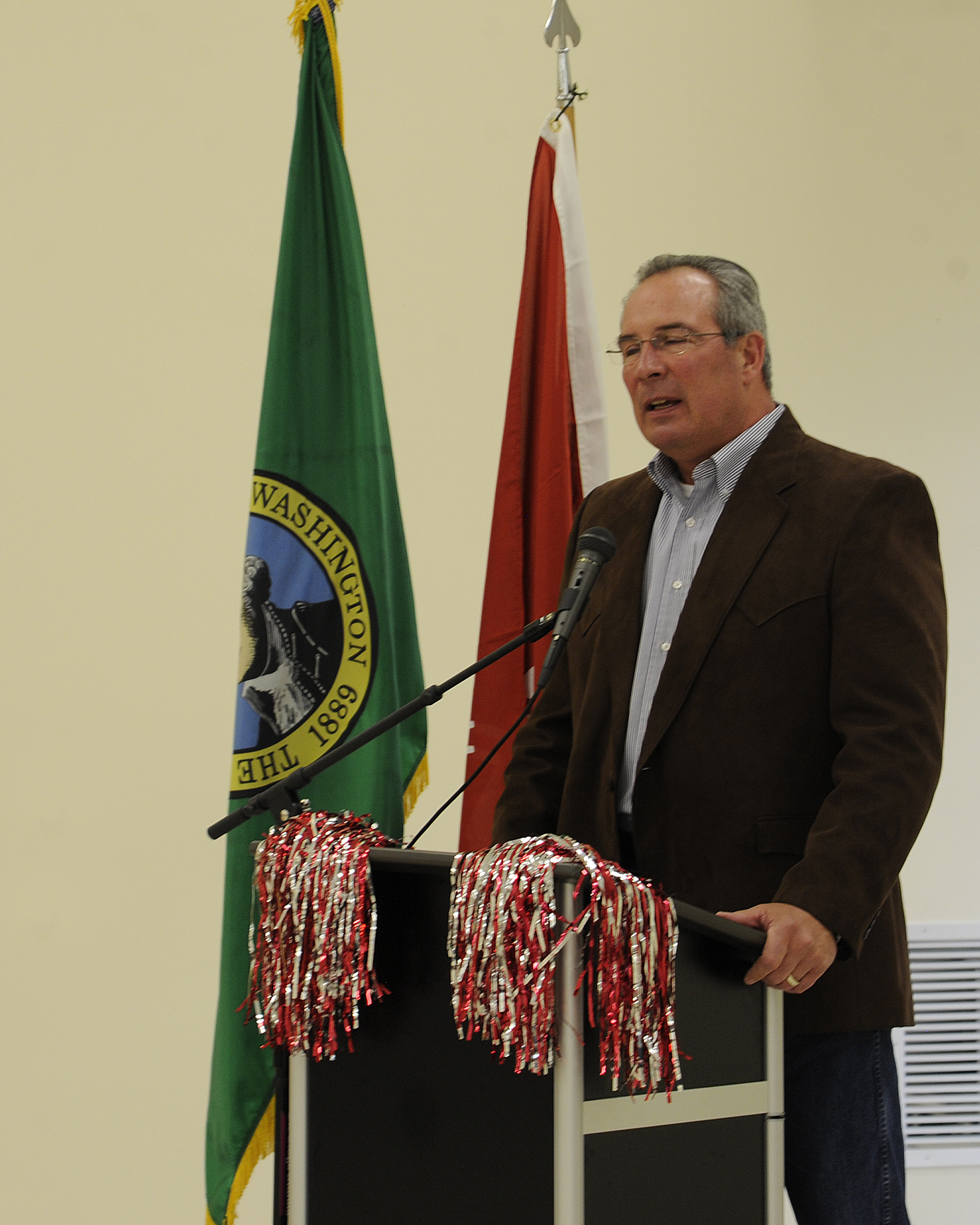
- Moos in 2010

Biographical details
- Born: circa 1951 (age 74–75); Edwall, Washington, U.S.

Playing career
- 1969–1972: Washington State
- Position: Offensive tackle

Administrative career (AD unless noted)
- 1982–1987: Washington State (asst. AD)
- 1988–1990: Washington State (assoc. AD)
- 1990–1995: Montana
- 1995–2007: Oregon
- 2010–2017: Washington State
- 2017–2021: Nebraska

Accomplishments and honors

Awards
- First-team All-Pac-8 (1972)

William H. Moos (born circa 1951) is an American former college athletics administrator and college football player. He served as the athletic director at the University of Montana from 1990 to 1995, the University of Oregon from 1995 to 2007, Washington State University from 2010 to 2018, and the University of Nebraska–Lincoln from 2017 to 2021. Moos played college football at Washington State from 1969 to 1972.

== Early life ==
Moos was born and raised on a wheat and cattle ranch in rural Washington, then moved to Olympia at age fourteen when his father was named director of agriculture for governor Daniel J. Evans. Moos graduated from Olympia High School and played college football at Washington State under head coach Jim Sweeney. In his senior season in 1972, Moos was one of two offensive tackles named to the All-Pac-8 team, and he graduated with a bachelor's degree in history in 1973.

== Administrative career ==
=== Oregon ===
Moos served as assistant athletics director at his alma mater from 1982 to 1990, before leaving to become the director of athletics at the University of Montana. He held that position until 1995, when he was hired as director of athletics at the University of Oregon, a position he held until 2007. At Oregon, Moos raised the athletics budget from $18.5 million to $40 million, which included a 2002 renovation of Autzen Stadium, and the construction of the Ed Moshofsky Sports Center. During Moos' tenure, Oregon won 13 Pac-10 championships and added soccer and lacrosse and university-sponsored programs.

Moos left Oregon in 2007 after a dispute with Nike founder and university donor Phil Knight. Terms of Moos' departure included an agreement that paid him $200,000 annually for not taking an administrative position at a Power Five school west of the Mississippi River. During his hiatus between 2007 and 2010, Moos took to raising beef cattle at his ranch at Valleyford, Washington, southeast of Spokane. The exact reasons for his resignation from Oregon are unknown, but the dispute with Knight regarding funding for an arena to replace the aging McArthur Court "strained a bit toward the end." After Moos resigned, Knight donated $100 million towards the building of a new arena for Oregon.

=== Washington State ===
Moos returned to Washington State as athletic director in 2010. During his tenure, he signed a ten-year marketing agreement with Nike, and, as dean of Pac-12 athletic directors, oversaw the conference's 12-year, $3 billion television agreement with Fox Sports and ESPN.

=== Nebraska ===
Moos was hired as Nebraska's director of athletics on October 15, 2017, at a base salary of $1 million, making him the second-highest paid athletic director in the Big Ten, behind only Wisconsin's Barry Alvarez. After firing Mike Riley at the end of the 2017 season, Moos hired former Nebraska quarterback Scott Frost from UCF to serve as head football coach. Just months after his hiring, Nebraska's volleyball program won the NCAA Tournament, giving Moos his first national championship as an administrator.

In March 2019, Moos fired men's basketball head coach Tim Miles, and replaced him with former Iowa State and Chicago Bulls head coach Fred Hoiberg, a Lincoln native. Moos retired in June 2021.

== Personal life ==
Moos and his wife Kendra have five children: daughters Christa, Brittany, and Kaiti, and sons Bo and Benjamin.
