= 1972 California Golden Bears football team =

American college football season

1972 California Golden Bears football
- Conference: Pacific-8 Conference
- Record: 3–8 (3–4 Pac-8)
- Head coach: Mike White (1st season)
- Home stadium: California Memorial Stadium

1972 Pacific-8 Conference football standings
	Conf.					Overall
Team	W		L		T	W		L		T
No. 1 USC $	7	–	0	–	0	12	–	0	–	0
No. 15 UCLA	5	–	2	–	0	8	–	3	–	0
No. 19 Washington State	4	–	3	–	0	7	–	4	–	0
Washington	4	–	3	–	0	8	–	3	–	0
California	3	–	4	–	0	3	–	8	–	0
Oregon	2	–	5	–	0	5	–	6	–	0
Stanford	2	–	5	–	0	6	–	5	–	0
Oregon State	1	–	6	–	0	2	–	9	–	0
$ – Conference champion; Rankings from AP Poll

The 1972 California Golden Bears football team was an American football team that represented the University of California, Berkeley in the Pacific-8 Conference (Pac-8) during the 1972 NCAA University Division football season. In their first year under head coach Mike White, the Golden Bears compiled a 3–8 record (3–4 in Pac-8, fifth) and were outscored 314 to 228. Home games were played on campus at California Memorial Stadium in Berkeley, California.

California's statistical leaders on offense were sophomore quarterback Steve Bartkowski with 944 passing yards, Steve Kemnitzer with 434 rushing yards, and Steve Sweeney with 785 receiving yards.

== Schedule ==
Date	Time	Opponent	Site	Result	Attendance	Source
September 9		at No. 2 Colorado*	Folsom Field; Boulder, CO	L 10–20	50,751	
September 16		Washington State	California Memorial Stadium; Berkeley, CA	W 37–23	30,794	
September 23	1:35 p.m.	San Jose State*	California Memorial Stadium; Berkeley, CA	L 10–17	28,000–28,691	
September 30	1:30 p.m.	at Missouri*	Faurot Field; Columbia, MO	L 27–34	41,000	
October 7	1:31 p.m.	No. 3 Ohio State*	California Memorial Stadium; Berkeley, CA	L 18–35	45,000	
October 14	1:31 p.m.	at No. 1 USC	Los Angeles Memorial Coliseum; Los Angeles, CA	L 14–42	56,488	
October 21	1:30 p.m.	No. 11 UCLA	California Memorial Stadium; Berkeley, CA (rivalry)	L 13–49	30,563	
October 28		at Washington	Husky Stadium; Seattle, WA	L 21–35	56,300	
November 4	1:32 p.m.	Oregon	California Memorial Stadium; Berkeley, CA	W 31–12	23,565	
November 11	1:30 p.m.	at Oregon State	Civic Stadium; Portland, OR	L 23–26	16,624	
November 18	1:33 p.m.	Stanford	California Memorial Stadium; Berkeley, CA (Big Game)	W 24–21	68,000	
*Non-conference game; Rankings from AP Poll released prior to the game; All times are in Pacific time

== Game summaries ==
=== Stanford ===
Stanford Cardinals at California Golden Bears

Quarter	1	2	3	4	Total
Stanford	7	7	0	7	21
California	0	3	8	13	24

at California Memorial Stadium, Berkeley, California

- Date: November 18, 1972
- Game attendance: 68,000
- Eugene Register-Guard. 1972 Nov 19.

Game information

First quarter

- STAN – Eric Cross 24-yard pass from Mike Boryla (Steve Murray kick). Stanford 7–0. Drive:

Second quarter

- CAL – Ray Wersching 29-yard field goal. Stanford 7–3. Drive:
- STAN – Gordon Riegel 71-yard interception return (Steve Murray kick). Stanford 14–3.

Third quarter

- CAL – Syl Youngblood 4-yard run (pass good). Stanford 14–11. Drive:

Fourth quarter

- CAL – Syl Youngblood 6-yard run (Ray Wersching kick). Cal 18–14. Drive:
- STAN – Reggie Sanderson 3-yard run (Rod Garcia kick), 3:42. Stanford 21–18. Drive:
- CAL – Steve Sweeney 7-yard pass from Vince Ferragamo, 0:00. Cal 24–21. Drive: 64 yards.

Top rushers

- CAL – Steve Kemnitzer – 15 rushes, 60 yards

- 75th meeting between the schools
- Steve Sweeney set single season conference record for receiving touchdowns, tied the single season school record and set the school career record for receptions.

== Roster ==
1972 California Golden Bears football team roster
Players
Coaches
Offense

Pos.	#	Name	Class
QB	10	Steve Bartkowski	So
WR		Dave Bateman
WR		Sammy Burns
QB		Jay Cruze
QB	15	Vince Ferragamo	Fr
WR		Mike Hodgins
OL		Randy Howard
OL		Scott Hudgins
RB		Rick Jones
RB		Steve Kemnitzer
OL		Mark Klink
OL		Steve Lawrence
OL		Kem Lawyer
RB		Fred Leathers
OL		Kevin O'Dorisio
TE		Steve Oliver
TE		Randy Schmidt
OL		Ted Seifert
WR		Mike Shaughnessy
RB		J.D. Smith
WR		Steve Sweeney	Sr
OL		Ray Volker
RB		Blane Warhurst
RB		Syl Youngblood

Defense

Pos.	#	Name	Class
DB		Bill Armstrong
DB		Robert Curry
DB		Clarence Duren
DL		Dave Frey
LB		Paul Giroday
DL		Dave Gleason
DB		Paul James
LB		Bill Johnson
DB		Jerry Jones
DB		Dave Lawson
DT	69	Bob Kampa	Sr
DL		Chris Keyser
DE	95	Jeff Sevy	So
LB		Bob Smith
DB		Scott Stringer	Sr
DT	90	Bob Swenson	So
LB	18	Loren Toews	Sr
DL		Fred Weber
DL		Steve Wendt

Special teams

Pos.	#	Name	Class
K	5	Ray Wersching	Sr

Head coach

- Mike White

Coordinators/assistant coaches

Legend

- (C) Team captain
- (S) Suspended
- (I) Ineligible
- Injured
- Redshirt
