= Bob Fouts =

American sportscaster (1921–2019)

- Born: Robert Oliver Fouts; December 19, 1921; Sacramento, California, U.S.
- Died: July 7, 2019 (aged 97); San Francisco, California, U.S.
- Sports commentary career
- Team(s): San Francisco 49ers San Francisco Warriors
- Genre: Play-by-play
- Sport(s): National Football League; National Basketball Association

Robert Oliver Fouts (December 19, 1921 – July 7, 2019) was an American sportscaster who was best known for his work as a play-by-play announcer for San Francisco 49ers football.

== Biography ==
Fouts worked with Lon Simmons on radio and television broadcasts for the 49ers in the 1950s. He also called basketball games for the Saint Mary's Gaels and other schools and covered ice hockey, golf, Pacific Coast League San Francisco Seals, track-and-field, and even wrestling. Fouts was elected into the Bay Area Radio Hall of Fame in 2008. He also covered the Olympic Games and served as sports anchor for KPIX-TV and KGO-TV and called games for the San Francisco Warriors.

== Personal ==
Fouts attended Christian Brothers High School and St. Mary's College of California and then went to serve in the U.S. Army Air Forces during World War II. He resided with his wife in San Francisco and had five children, one of whom, Dan Fouts, went on to become a Pro Football Hall of Fame quarterback and football broadcaster.
