= 1972 Pacific-8 Conference football season =

American college football season

- League: NCAA
- Sport: College football
- Duration: September 8, 1972, to January 1, 1973
- Teams: 8

1973 NFL draft
- Top draft pick: Charle Young, TE
- Picked by: Philadelphia Eagles, 6th overall

Regular season
- Season champions: USC
- Runners-up: UCLA

Seasons
- 1971 1973

1972 Pacific-8 Conference football standings
	Conf.					Overall
Team	W		L		T	W		L		T
No. 1 USC $	7	–	0	–	0	12	–	0	–	0
No. 15 UCLA	5	–	2	–	0	8	–	3	–	0
No. 19 Washington State	4	–	3	–	0	7	–	4	–	0
Washington	4	–	3	–	0	8	–	3	–	0
California	3	–	4	–	0	3	–	8	–	0
Oregon	2	–	5	–	0	5	–	6	–	0
Stanford	2	–	5	–	0	6	–	5	–	0
Oregon State	1	–	6	–	0	2	–	9	–	0
$ – Conference champion; Rankings from AP Poll

The 1972 Pacific-8 Conference football season took place during the 1972 NCAA University Division football season. The conference featured the eventual national champions in USC.

== Games ==
=== Week 1 ===
Date	Visiting team	Home team	Site	Result	Attendance	Ref.
September 8	Oregon State	San Diego State	San Diego, CA	L 8–17	-	
September 9	California	No. 2 Colorado	Folsom Field • Boulder, CO	L 10–20	-	
September 9	Oregon	Missouri	Columbia, MO	L 22–24	-	
September 9	No. 8 USC	No. 4 Arkansas	War Memorial Stadium • Little Rock, AR	W 31–10	-	
September 9	No. 1 Nebraska	UCLA	Los Angeles Memorial Coliseum • Los Angeles, CA	W 20–17	-	
September 9	Pacific	No. 9 Washington	Husky Stadium • Seattle, WA	W 13–6	-	
September 9	Washington State	Kansas	Memorial Stadium • Lawrence, KS	W 18–17	-	
^{#}Rankings from AP Poll released prior to game.

=== Week 2 ===
Date	Visiting team	Home team	Site	Result	Attendance	Ref.
September 16	Washington State	California	California Memorial Stadium • Berkeley, CA	CAL 37–23	-	
September 16	Arizona	Oregon	Autzen Stadium • Eugene, OR	W 34–7	-	
September 16	Oregon State	No. 1 USC	Los Angeles Memorial Coliseum • Los Angeles, CA	USC 51–6	-	
September 16	San Jose State	Stanford	Stanford Stadium • Stanford, CA (Rivalry)	W 44–0	-	
September 16	No. 8 UCLA	Pittsburgh	Pitt Stadium • Pittsburgh, PA	W 38–28	-	
September 16	Duke	No. 12 Washington	Husky Stadium • Seattle, WA	W 14–6	-	
^{#}Rankings from AP Poll released prior to game.

=== Week 3 ===
Date	Visiting team	Home team	Site	Result	Attendance	Ref.
September 23	Oregon State	Iowa	Kinnick Stadium • Iowa City, IA	L 11–19	-	
September 23	No. 12 Michigan	No. 6 UCLA	Los Angeles Memorial Coliseum • Los Angeles, CA	L 9–26	-	
September 23	Oregon	No. 2 Oklahoma	Oklahoma Memorial Stadium • Norman, OK	L 3–68	-	
September 23	San Jose State	California	California Memorial Stadium • Berkeley, CA	L 10–17	-	
September 23	No. 1 USC	Illinois	Memorial Stadium • Champaign, IL	W 55–20	-	
September 23	No. 19 Stanford	Duke	Wallace Wade Stadium • Durham, NC	W 10–6	-	
September 23	No. 15 Washington	Purdue	Ross–Ade Stadium • West Lafayette, IN	W 22–21	-	
September 23	Washington State	Arizona	Arizona Stadium • Tucson, AZ	W 28–6	-	
^{#}Rankings from AP Poll released prior to game.

=== Week 4 ===
Date	Visiting team	Home team	Site	Result	Attendance	Ref.
September 29	Oregon	No. 15 UCLA	Los Angeles Memorial Coliseum • Los Angeles, CA	UCLA 65–20	-	
September 30	California	Missouri	Columbia, MO	L 27–34	-	
September 30	BYU	Oregon State	Parker Stadium • Corvallis, OR	W 29–3	-	
September 30	Michigan State	No. 1 USC	Los Angeles Memorial Coliseum • Los Angeles, CA	W 51–6	-	
September 30	No. 20 West Virginia	No. 19 Stanford	Stanford Stadium • Stanford, CA	W 41–35	-	
September 30	Utah	Washington State	Martin Stadium • Pullman, WA	L 25–44	-	
September 30	Illinois	No. 14 Washington	Husky Stadium • Seattle, WA	W 31–11	-	
^{#}Rankings from AP Poll released prior to game.

=== Week 5 ===
Date	Visiting team	Home team	Site	Result	Attendance	Ref.
October 7	Oregon State	Arizona State	Sun Devil Stadium • Tempe, AZ	L 7–38	-	
October 7	No. 3 Ohio State	California	Memorial Stadium • Berkeley, CA	L 18–35	-	
October 7	No. 1 USC	No. 15 Stanford	Stanford Stadium • Stanford, CA	USC 30–21	-	
October 7	Arizona	No. 14 UCLA	Los Angeles Memorial Coliseum • Los Angeles, CA	W 42–31	-	
October 7	Oregon	No. 11 Washington	Husky Stadium • Seattle, WA (Rivalry)	WASH 23–17	-	
October 7	Idaho	Washington State	Martin Stadium • Pullman, WA (Battle of the Palouse)	W 35–14	-	
^{#}Rankings from AP Poll released prior to game.

=== Week 6 ===
Date	Visiting team	Home team	Site	Result	Attendance	Ref.
October 14	California	No. 1 USC	Los Angeles Memorial Coliseum • Los Angeles, CA	USC 42–14	-	
October 14	No. 12 Washington	No. 17 Stanford	Stanford Stadium • Stanford, CA	STAN 24–0	-	
October 14	No. 14 UCLA	Oregon State	Parker Stadium • Corvallis, OR	UCLA 37–7	-	
October 14	Washington State	Oregon	Autzen Stadium • Eugene, OR	WSU 31–14	-	
^{#}Rankings from AP Poll released prior to game.

=== Week 7 ===
Date	Visiting team	Home team	Site	Result	Attendance	Ref.
October 21	No. 13 Stanford	Oregon	Autzen Stadium • Eugene, OR	ORE 15–13	-	
October 21	No. 18 Washington	No. 1 USC	Los Angeles Memorial Coliseum • Los Angeles, CA	USC 34–7	-	
October 21	No. 11 UCLA	California	Memorial Stadium • Berkeley, CA (Rivalry)	UCLA 49–13	-	
October 21	Oregon State	Washington St	Martin Stadium • Pullman, WA	WSU 37–7	-	
^{#}Rankings from AP Poll released prior to game.

=== Week 8 ===
Date	Visiting team	Home team	Site	Result	Attendance	Ref.
October 28	No. 1 USC	Oregon	Autzen Stadium • Eugene, OR	USC 18–0	-	
October 28	Oregon St	Stanford	Stanford Stadium • Stanford, CA	STAN 17–11	-	
October 28	Washington St	UCLA	Los Angeles Memorial Coliseum • Los Angeles, CA	UCLA 35–20	-	
October 28	California	Washington	Husky Stadium • Seattle, WA	WASH 35–21	-	
^{#}Rankings from AP Poll released prior to game.

=== Week 9 ===
Date	Visiting team	Home team	Site	Result	Attendance	Ref.
November 4	Oregon	California	Memorial Stadium • Berkeley, CA	CAL 31–12	-	
November 4	No. 1 USC	Washington St	Husky Stadium • Seattle, WA	USC 44–3	-	
November 4	Stanford	No. 8 UCLA	Los Angeles Memorial Coliseum • Los Angeles, CA	UCLA 28–23	-	
November 4	Washington	Oregon St	Parker Stadium • Corvallis, OR	WASH 23–16	-	
^{#}Rankings from AP Poll released prior to game.

=== Week 10 ===
Date	Visiting team	Home team	Site	Result	Attendance	Ref.
November 11	San Jose St	Oregon	Autzen Stadium • Eugene, OR	W 27–2	-	
November 11	California	Oregon St	Multnomah Stadium • Portland, OR	ORST 26–23	-	
November 11	No. 8 UCLA	Washington	Husky Stadium • Seattle, WA	WASH 30–21	-	
November 11	No. 20 Stanford	Washington St	Martin Stadium • Pullman, WA	WSU 27–13	-	
^{#}Rankings from AP Poll released prior to game.

=== Week 11 ===
Date	Visiting team	Home team	Site	Result	Attendance	Ref.
November 18	Stanford	California	Memorial Stadium • Berkeley, CA (Big Game)	CAL 24–21	-	
November 18	Oregon	Oregon St	Parker Stadium • Corvallis, OR (Civil War)	ORE 30–3	-	
November 18	No. 1 USC	No. 14 UCLA	Los Angeles Memorial Coliseum • Los Angeles, CA (Victory Bell)	USC 24–7	-	
November 18	No. 17 Washington	No. 20 Washington St	Joe Albi Stadium • Spokane, WA (Apple Cup)	WSU 27–10	-	
^{#}Rankings from AP Poll released prior to game.

=== Bowl games ===
Date	Visiting team	Home team	Site	Result	Attendance	Ref.
January 1	No. 3 Ohio State	No. 1 USC	Rose Bowl • Pasadena, CA (Rose Bowl)	W 42–17	-	
^{#}Rankings from AP Poll released prior to game.

== See also ==
- 1972 All-Pacific-8 Conference football team
