= 1972 UCLA Bruins football team =

American college football season

1972 UCLA Bruins football
- Conference: Pacific-8 Conference

Ranking
- Coaches: No. T–17
- AP: No. 15
- Record: 8–3 (5–2 Pac-8)
- Head coach: Pepper Rodgers (2nd season)
- Offensive coordinator: Homer Smith (1st season)
- Offensive scheme: Wishbone
- Home stadium: Los Angeles Memorial Coliseum

1972 Pacific-8 Conference football standings
	Conf.					Overall
Team	W		L		T	W		L		T
No. 1 USC $	7	–	0	–	0	12	–	0	–	0
No. 15 UCLA	5	–	2	–	0	8	–	3	–	0
No. 19 Washington State	4	–	3	–	0	7	–	4	–	0
Washington	4	–	3	–	0	8	–	3	–	0
California	3	–	4	–	0	3	–	8	–	0
Oregon	2	–	5	–	0	5	–	6	–	0
Stanford	2	–	5	–	0	6	–	5	–	0
Oregon State	1	–	6	–	0	2	–	9	–	0
$ – Conference champion; Rankings from AP Poll

The 1972 UCLA Bruins football team represented University of California, Los Angeles (UCLA) in the 1972 NCAA University Division football season. Members of the Pacific-8 Conference, the Bruins were led by second-year head coach Pepper Rodgers and played their home games at the Los Angeles Memorial Coliseum.

The new quarterback this season was Mark Harmon, a junior college transfer and son of Heisman Trophy winner Tom Harmon. In his first game for the Bruins, Harmon led the wishbone offense and gained a late night upset of top-ranked Nebraska at the Coliseum. An 18-point underdog, UCLA was never behind; Nebraska had five turnovers but fought back to tie the score before halftime at ten and again early in the fourth quarter at seventeen. In their final drive, Harmon drove UCLA into field goal range and Efrén Herrera made a 29-yarder in the final half minute for the 20–17 win. It halted the two-time defending national champion Huskers' unbeaten streak at 32 games and vaulted the previously unranked Bruins (2–7–1 in 1971) to eighth in the AP Poll, as Nebraska slid to tenth.

Two weeks later, the Bruins lost at home to Michigan, but then won six straight and improved to 8–1 overall. An upset loss to Washington at Husky Stadium in Seattle and an expected one to top-ranked rival USC in the Coliseum ended UCLA's season at 8–3. The Pac-8 runner-up at 5–2, they were ranked fifteenth in the final AP poll; the conference did not allow a second bowl team until the 1975 season.

== Schedule ==
Date	Time	Opponent	Rank	Site	Result	Attendance	Source
September 9		No. 1 Nebraska*		Los Angeles Memorial Coliseum; Los Angeles, CA	W 20–17	67,702	
September 16		at Pittsburgh*	No. 8	Pitt Stadium; Pittsburgh, PA	W 38–28	24,315	
September 23		No. 12 Michigan*	No. 6	Los Angeles Memorial Coliseum; Los Angeles, CA	L 9–26	57,129	
September 29		Oregon	No. 15	Los Angeles Memorial Coliseum; Los Angeles, CA	W 65–20	30,309	
October 7		Arizona*	No. 14	Los Angeles Memorial Coliseum; Los Angeles, CA	W 42–31	27,321	
October 14		at Oregon State	No. 14	Parker Stadium; Corvallis, OR	W 37–7	23,109	
October 21	1:31 p.m.	at California	No. 11	California Memorial Stadium; Berkeley, CA	W 49–13	33,000	
October 28		Washington State	No. 9	Los Angeles Memorial Coliseum; Los Angeles, CA	W 35–20	29,950	
November 4	1:32 p.m.	Stanford	No. 8	Los Angeles Memorial Coliseum; Los Angeles, CA	W 28–23	47,276	
November 11		at Washington	No. 8	Husky Stadium; Seattle, WA	L 21–30	59,500	
November 18		vs. No. 1 USC	No. 14	Los Angeles Memorial Coliseum; Los Angeles, CA (Victory Bell)	L 7–24	59,151	
*Non-conference game; Rankings from AP Poll released prior to the game; All times are in Pacific time

== Roster ==
1972 UCLA Bruins football team roster
Players
Coaches
Offense

Pos.	#	Name	Class
G	65	Brian Goodman	Sr
QB	7	Mark Harmon	Jr
WR	82	Brad Lyman	Sr
RB	32	James McAlister	Jr
QB	15	John Sciarra	Fr
RB	21	Rob Scribner	Sr
OT	74	Bruce Walton	Sr

Defense

Pos.	#	Name	Class
DB	20	Jimmy Allen	Jr
FS	24	Jim Bright	Jr
DB	29	Alan Ellis	Sr
DB	22	Mike Fryer	Jr
DE	92	Fred McNeill	Jr
DE	90	Cal Peterson	Jr
DT	66	Bill Sandifer	Jr
LB	8	Jack Jorgensen	So
LB	56	Terry Tautolo	Fr

Special teams

Pos.	#	Name	Class
P	44	Bruce Barnes	So
K	1	Efrén Herrera	Jr

Head coach

- Pepper Rodgers

Coordinators/assistant coaches

Legend

- (C) Team captain
- (S) Suspended
- (I) Ineligible
- Injured
- Redshirt

== Awards and honors ==
- All-Conference First Team: Bruce Barnes (P), Allan Ellis (DB), Kermit Johnson (RB), Steve Klosterman (OG), James McAlister (RB), Fred McNeill (DE), Bruce Walton (OT)
