= Calvin Jones (cornerback) =

American football player (1951–2021)

No. 26
- Position: Cornerback

Personal information
- Born: January 26, 1951; San Francisco, California, U.S.
- Died: October 24, 2021 (aged 70); San Francisco, California, U.S.
- Listed height: 5 ft 7 in (1.70 m)
- Listed weight: 170 lb (77 kg)

Career information
- High school: Balboa (San Francisco, California)
- College: Washington
- NFL draft: 1973: 15th round, 373rd overall pick

Career history
- Denver Broncos (1973–1976)

Awards and highlights
- First-team All-American (1972); 3× First-team All-Pac-8 (1970, 1971, 1972); Washington MVP (1972)

Career NFL statistics
- Interceptions: 12
- Fumble recoveries: 2
- Defensive TDs: 1
- Stats at Pro Football Reference

Calvin Jones (January 26, 1951 – October 24, 2021) was an American professional football player who was a cornerback in the National Football League (NFL) with the Denver Broncos. He played college football at the University of Washington in Seattle, and graduated from Balboa High School in San Francisco in the fall of 1968.

In 1970, Jones, along with Mark Wheeler and Ira Hammon, quit the UW football team, holding a press conference denouncing racial discrimination on the part of the coaching staff, led by head coach Jim Owens. In 1971, Don Smith, an African-American, was appointed UW assistant athletic director. Smith asked Jones to return to the UW, and Jones became an All-American in 1972.

Jones was selected in the fifteenth round of the 1973 NFL draft (373rd overall) by the Washington Redskins. He played four seasons with the Denver Broncos.

Jones died on October 24, 2021, at the age of 70.

== See also ==
- Washington Huskies football statistical leaders
