= 1972 Oregon State Beavers football team =

American college football season

1972 Oregon State Beavers football
- Conference: Pacific-8 Conference
- Record: 2–9 (1–6 Pac-8)
- Head coach: Dee Andros (8th season)
- Home stadium: Parker Stadium; Civic Stadium

1972 Pacific-8 Conference football standings
	Conf.					Overall
Team	W		L		T	W		L		T
No. 1 USC $	7	–	0	–	0	12	–	0	–	0
No. 15 UCLA	5	–	2	–	0	8	–	3	–	0
No. 19 Washington State	4	–	3	–	0	7	–	4	–	0
Washington	4	–	3	–	0	8	–	3	–	0
California	3	–	4	–	0	3	–	8	–	0
Oregon	2	–	5	–	0	5	–	6	–	0
Stanford	2	–	5	–	0	6	–	5	–	0
Oregon State	1	–	6	–	0	2	–	9	–	0
$ – Conference champion; Rankings from AP Poll

The 1972 Oregon State Beavers football team represented Oregon State University as a member of the Pacific-8 Conference (Pac-8) during the 1972 NCAA University Division football season. In their eighth season under head coach Dee Andros, the Beavers compiled an overall record of 2–9 record with a mark of 1–6 in conference play, placing last out of eight teams in the Pac-8, and were outscored 295 to 131. Oregon State played four home games on campus at Parker Stadium in Corvallis and one at Civic Stadium in Portland.

The loss to rival Oregon was Andros' first setback in the Civil War game, and the Ducks' first win over the Beavers in nine years.

== Schedule ==
Date	Time	Opponent	Site	Result	Attendance	Source
September 8		at San Diego State*	San Diego Stadium; San Diego, CA	L 8–17	32,829	
September 16		at No. 1 USC	Los Angeles Memorial Coliseum; Los Angeles, CA	L 6–51	56,305	
September 23		at Iowa*	Kinnick Stadium; Iowa City, IA	L 11–19	51,229	
September 30		BYU*	Parker Stadium; Corvallis, OR	W 29–3	26,065	
October 7		at Arizona State*	Sun Devil Stadium; Tempe, AZ	L 7–38	50,879	
October 14		No. 14 UCLA	Parker Stadium; Corvallis, OR	L 7–37	23,109	
October 21		at Washington State	Martin Stadium; Pullman, WA	L 7–37	22,100	
October 28	1:30 p.m.	at Stanford	Stanford Stadium; Stanford, CA	L 11–17	44,000	
November 4		Washington	Parker Stadium; Corvallis, OR	L 16–23	31,923	
November 11	1:30 p.m.	California	Civic Stadium; Portland, OR	W 26–23	16,624	
November 18		Oregon	Parker Stadium; Corvallis, OR (Civil War)	L 3–30	41,544	
*Non-conference game; Rankings from AP Poll released prior to the game; All times are in Pacific time

== Roster ==
- Steve Brown, Sr. (defense)
- Craig Fair, Jr. (defense)
