= 1972 Oregon Ducks football team =

American college football season

1972 Oregon Ducks football
- Conference: Pacific-8 Conference
- Record: 4–7 (2–5 Pac-8)
- Head coach: Dick Enright (1st season)
- Captain: Game captains
- Home stadium: Autzen Stadium

1972 Pacific-8 Conference football standings
	Conf.					Overall
Team	W		L		T	W		L		T
No. 1 USC $	7	–	0	–	0	12	–	0	–	0
No. 15 UCLA	5	–	2	–	0	8	–	3	–	0
No. 19 Washington State	4	–	3	–	0	7	–	4	–	0
Washington	4	–	3	–	0	8	–	3	–	0
California	3	–	4	–	0	3	–	8	–	0
Oregon	2	–	5	–	0	5	–	6	–	0
Stanford	2	–	5	–	0	6	–	5	–	0
Oregon State	1	–	6	–	0	2	–	9	–	0
$ – Conference champion; Rankings from AP Poll

The 1972 Oregon Ducks football team represented the University of Oregon in the Pacific-8 Conference during the 1972 NCAA University Division football season. Home games were played in Eugene at Autzen Stadium.

Led by first-year head coach Dick Enright, the Ducks were 4–7 overall (2–5 in Pac-8, tied for sixth), and were outscored 285 to 194. Oregon met five ranked teams and won once. In the Civil War at Parker Stadium in Corvallis, the Ducks broke an eight-game losing streak against Oregon State, beating OSU head coach Dee Andros for the first time in the series. Previously the offensive line coach, Enright was promoted in early February, two weeks after the resignation of Jerry Frei.

Oregon was led on the field by senior quarterback Dan Fouts, a three-year starter who was selected in the third round of the 1973 NFL Draft, 64th overall. He played fifteen seasons in the NFL for the San Diego Chargers and is a member of the Pro Football Hall of Fame.

== Schedule ==
Date	Time	Opponent	Site	Result	Attendance	Source
September 9		at Missouri*	Faurot Field; Columbia, MO	L 22–24	41,236	
September 16		Arizona*	Autzen Stadium; Eugene, OR	W 34–7	30,000	
September 23		at No. 2 Oklahoma*	Oklahoma Memorial Stadium; Norman OK	L 3–68	61,826	
September 29		at No. 15 UCLA	Los Angeles Memorial Coliseum; Los Angeles, CA	L 20–65	30,209	
October 7		at No. 11 Washington	Husky Stadium; Seattle, WA (rivalry)	L 17–23	61,000	
October 14		Washington State	Autzen Stadium; Eugene, OR	L 14–31	23,000	
October 21	1:30 p.m.	No. 13 Stanford	Autzen Stadium; Eugene, OR	W 15–13	27,500	
October 28		No. 1 USC	Autzen Stadium; Eugene, OR	L 0–18	32,000	
November 4	1:32 p.m.	at California	California Memorial Stadium; Berkeley, CA	L 12–31	23,000	
November 11	1:30 p.m.	San Jose State*	Autzen Stadium; Eugene, OR	W 27–2	27,500	
November 18		Oregon State	Parker Stadium; Corvallis, OR (Civil War)	W 30–3	41,544	
*Non-conference game; Rankings from AP Poll released prior to the game; All times are in Pacific time

== Game summaries ==
=== Oregon State ===
Team	1	2	3	4	Total
• Oregon	10	17	3	0	30
Oregon St	0	3	0	0	3

- Date: November 18
- Location: Parker Stadium
- Game attendance: 41,544
- Game weather: Rain

Scoring summary
Q1	12:57	ORE	Reynolds 60 yard run (Woodward kick)	ORE 7–0
Q1	1:45	ORE	Woodward 41 yard field goal	ORE 10–0
Q2	8:01	ORE	Woodward 23 yard field goal	ORE 13–0
Q2	6:21	ORE	Lindsay 65 yard pass from Fouts (kick failed)	ORE 19–0
Q2	2:28	ORST	McGraw 28 yard field goal	ORE 19–3
Q2	0:00	ORE	Guy recovered blocked punt in end zone (Specht pass from Fouts)	ORE 27–3
Q3	7:59	ORE	Woodward 31 yard field goal	ORE 30–3

Oregon's first win over its in-state rival in nine years.

== Roster ==
1972 Oregon Ducks football team roster
Players
Coaches
Offense

Pos.	#	Name	Class
FB	41	Jim Anderson	Sr
HB	26	Maurice Anderson	Jr
G	66	LeFrancis Arnold	Jr
C	57	Chuck Bradley	Sr
G	76	Mike Bollinger	Jr
TE	81	Russ Francis	So
QB	11	Dan Fouts	Sr
G	68	Dan Haugum	Sr
OT	71	Ron Hunt	Fr
RB	30	Henderson Martin	So
RB	22	Don Reynolds	So
OT	70	Tim Stokes	Sr
SE	87	Greg Specht	Sr
G	64	Marc Traut	So
QB	17	Norv Turner	So

Defense

Pos.	#	Name	Class
DE	13	Greg Brosterhous	Sr
DB	23	Jack Conners	Jr
DE	66	Keith Davis	Jr
DB	38	Steve Donnelly	So
DE	91	Dave Freeman	So
LB	43	Bobby Green	Fr
DE	82	Tim Guy	Jr
LB	32	Steve Herr	Jr
LB	55	Mike Jodoin	Jr
CB	37	Fred Manuel	Sr
S	39	Dave Pieper	Sr
LB	56	Mike Popovich	So
DT	63	Mike Pulver	Sr
DT	97	Art Webb	Jr

Special teams

Pos.	#	Name	Class
P	45	Bob Palm	So
K		Keith Lively
K	24	Hugh Woodward

Head coach

- Dick Enright (1st year)

Coordinators/assistant coaches

Legend

- (C) Team captain
- (S) Suspended
- (I) Ineligible
- Injured
- Redshirt

== All-conference ==
Two Oregon seniors were named to the All-Pac-8 team: quarterback Dan Fouts and wide receiver Greg Specht.

== NFL draft ==
Three Oregon seniors were selected in the 1973 NFL draft: center Chuck Bradley (52nd), tackle Tim Stokes (60th), and quarterback Dan Fouts (64th).
