= PFWA NFL Most Valuable Player =

Annual American football award

The Pro Football Writers of America (PFWA) first gave a National Football League Most Valuable Player Award in 1966 to Bart Starr. After an eight-season hiatus, the award returned in 1975. As with other PFWA awards, any member of the organisation is eligible to vote.

Season	Player	Team	Position	Ref
1966	Bart Starr	Green Bay Packers	Quarterback	
1967–1974	Not awarded			
1975	Fran Tarkenton	Minnesota Vikings	Quarterback	
1976	Bert Jones	Baltimore Colts	Quarterback	
1977	Walter Payton	Chicago Bears	Running back	
1978	Earl Campbell	Houston Oilers	Running back	
1979	Earl Campbell (2)	Houston Oilers	Running back	
1980	Brian Sipe	Cleveland Browns	Quarterback	
1981	Ken Anderson	Cincinnati Bengals	Quarterback	
1982	Dan Fouts	San Diego Chargers	Quarterback	
1983	Joe Theismann	Washington Redskins	Quarterback	
1984	Dan Marino	Miami Dolphins	Quarterback	
1985	Marcus Allen	Los Angeles Raiders	Running back	
1986	Lawrence Taylor	New York Giants	Linebacker	
1987	Jerry Rice	San Francisco 49ers	Wide receiver	
1988	Boomer Esiason	Cincinnati Bengals	Quarterback	
1989	Joe Montana	San Francisco 49ers	Quarterback	
1990	Randall Cunningham	Philadelphia Eagles	Quarterback	
1991	Thurman Thomas	Buffalo Bills	Running back	
1992	Steve Young	San Francisco 49ers	Quarterback	
1993	Emmitt Smith	Dallas Cowboys	Running back	
1994	Steve Young (2)	San Francisco 49ers	Quarterback	
1995	Brett Favre	Green Bay Packers	Quarterback	
1996	Brett Favre (2)	Green Bay Packers	Quarterback	
1997	Barry Sanders	Detroit Lions	Running back	
1998	Terrell Davis	Denver Broncos	Running back	
1999	Kurt Warner	St. Louis Rams	Quarterback	
2000	Marshall Faulk	St. Louis Rams	Running back	
2001	Marshall Faulk (2)	St. Louis Rams	Running back	
2002	Rich Gannon	Oakland Raiders	Quarterback	
2003	Jamal Lewis	Baltimore Ravens	Running back	
2004	Peyton Manning	Indianapolis Colts	Quarterback	
2005	Shaun Alexander	Seattle Seahawks	Running back	
2006	LaDainian Tomlinson	San Diego Chargers	Running back	
2007	Tom Brady	New England Patriots	Quarterback	
2008	Peyton Manning (2)	Indianapolis Colts	Quarterback	
2009	Peyton Manning (3)	Indianapolis Colts	Quarterback	
2010	Tom Brady (2)	New England Patriots	Quarterback	
2011	Aaron Rodgers	Green Bay Packers	Quarterback	
2012	Adrian Peterson	Minnesota Vikings	Running back	
2013	Peyton Manning (4)	Denver Broncos	Quarterback	
2014	Aaron Rodgers (2)	Green Bay Packers	Quarterback	
2015	Cam Newton	Carolina Panthers	Quarterback	
2016	Matt Ryan	Atlanta Falcons	Quarterback	
2017	Tom Brady (3)	New England Patriots	Quarterback	
2018	Patrick Mahomes	Kansas City Chiefs	Quarterback	
2019	Lamar Jackson	Baltimore Ravens	Quarterback	
2020	Aaron Rodgers (3)	Green Bay Packers	Quarterback	
2021	Aaron Rodgers (4)	Green Bay Packers	Quarterback	
2022	Patrick Mahomes (2)	Kansas City Chiefs	Quarterback	
2023	Lamar Jackson (2)	Baltimore Ravens	Quarterback	
2024	Lamar Jackson (3)	Baltimore Ravens	Quarterback	
2025	Matthew Stafford	Los Angeles Rams	Quarterback	
