= 1972 Washington Huskies football team =

American college football season

1972 Washington Huskies football
- Conference: Pacific-8 Conference
- Record: 8–3 (4–3 Pac-8)
- Head coach: Jim Owens (16th season)
- MVP: Calvin Jones
- Captains: Bill Cahill; Sonny Sixkiller
- Home stadium: Husky Stadium

1972 Pacific-8 Conference football standings
	Conf.					Overall
Team	W		L		T	W		L		T
No. 1 USC $	7	–	0	–	0	12	–	0	–	0
No. 15 UCLA	5	–	2	–	0	8	–	3	–	0
No. 19 Washington State	4	–	3	–	0	7	–	4	–	0
Washington	4	–	3	–	0	8	–	3	–	0
California	3	–	4	–	0	3	–	8	–	0
Oregon	2	–	5	–	0	5	–	6	–	0
Stanford	2	–	5	–	0	6	–	5	–	0
Oregon State	1	–	6	–	0	2	–	9	–	0
$ – Conference champion; Rankings from AP Poll

The 1972 Washington Huskies football team was an American football team that represented the University of Washington during the 1972 NCAA University Division football season. In its 16th season under head coach Jim Owens, the team compiled an 8–3 record, finished in a tie for third place in the Pacific-8 Conference, and outscored its opponents by a combined total of 208 to 204.

Defensive back Bill Cahill and quarterback Sonny Sixkiller were the team captains, and defensive back Calvin Jones was selected as the team's most valuable player.

A top ten pick in the preseason, the Huskies were undefeated after five games and ranked twelfth in the AP Poll, but Sixkiller suffered ankle and knee injuries early in the Stanford game in mid-October. Quarterbacks Greg Collins, Dennis Fitzpatrick, and Mark Backman then led the offense, with losses at Stanford and #1 USC, followed by consecutive wins over California and Oregon State.

Sixkiller returned to the lineup for senior day at Husky Stadium on November 11 and Washington beat #8 UCLA, but dropped the Apple Cup to #20 Washington State at Spokane. The Pac-8 did not allow a second bowl team until the 1975 season.

== Schedule ==
Date	Time	Opponent	Rank	Site	Result	Attendance	Source
September 9		Pacific (CA)*	No. 9	Husky Stadium; Seattle, WA	W 13–6	57,500	
September 16		Duke*	No. 12	Husky Stadium; Seattle, WA	W 14–6	59,200	
September 23		at Purdue*	No. 15	Ross–Ade Stadium; West Lafayette, IN	W 22–21	60,102	
September 30		Illinois*	No. 14	Husky Stadium; Seattle, WA	W 31–11	61,200	
October 7		Oregon	No. 11	Husky Stadium; Seattle, WA (rivalry)	W 23–17	61,000	
October 14	1:30 p.m.	at No. 17 Stanford	No. 12	Stanford Stadium; Stanford, CA	L 0–24	56,000	
October 21		at No. 1 USC	No. 18	Los Angeles Memorial Coliseum; Los Angeles, CA	L 7–34	59,151	
October 28		California		Husky Stadium; Seattle, WA	W 35–21	56,300	
November 4		at Oregon State		Parker Stadium; Corvallis, OR	W 23–16	31,923	
November 11		No. 8 UCLA		Husky Stadium; Seattle, WA	W 30–21	59,000	
November 18		at No. 20 Washington State	No. 17	Joe Albi Stadium; Spokane, WA (Apple Cup)	L 10–27	34,100	
*Non-conference game; Rankings from AP Poll released prior to the game; All times are in Pacific time

== Roster ==
1972 Washington Huskies football team roster
Players
Coaches
Offense

Pos.	#	Name	Class
TB	5	Glen Bonner	Jr
QB	6	Sonny Sixkiller (C)	Sr
QB	10	Mark Backman	So
QB	14	Dennis Fitzpatrick	So
QB	15	Greg Collins	Sr
FL	17	Scott Loomis	Sr
WR	26	Tom Scott	Sr
FB	30	Pete Taggares	Jr
C	56	Al Kelso	Sr
G	63	Steve Wallin	Sr
G	64	Pete Elswick	Jr
OT	70	Steve Schulte	Sr
OT	72	Jim Smith	Sr
TE	87	John Brady	Sr

Defense

Pos.	#	Name	Class
DB, PK	16	Steve Wiezbowski	Sr
FS	18	Bill Cahill (C)	Sr
CB	20	Calvin Jones	Sr
SS	24	Tony Bonwell	Sr
CB	28	Phil Andre	Sr
LB	36	Bob Ferguson	Sr
LB	37	Ron Shepherd	Sr
CB	42	Roberto Jourdan	Fr
LB	46	Brian Doheny	Jr
DT	50	Don Gorman	Sr
DT	59	Gordy Guinn	Sr
DE	69	Ben Albrecht	Sr
DT	80	Dave Pear	So
DE	99	Kurt Matter	Sr

Special teams

Pos.	#	Name	Class
P	3	Skip Boyd	So
PK	16	Steve Wiezbowski	Sr

Head coach

- Jim Owens (16th year)

Coordinators/assistant coaches

- Mel Thompson
- Otto Kofler
- Ray Jackson
- Bob Schloredt
- Jim Lambright
- Jerry Cheek
- Marv Weetman (freshman)

Legend

- (C) Team captain
- (S) Suspended
- (I) Ineligible
- Injured
- Redshirt

== NFL draft selections ==
Six UW Huskies were selected in the 1973 NFL draft, which lasted 17 rounds with 442 selections.

= Husky Hall of Fame

Player	Position	Round	Pick	Franchise
John Brady	Tight end	3rd	58	Detroit Lions
Bill Cahill	Defensive back	7th	158	New Orleans Saints
Tom Scott	Wide receiver	12th	304	Detroit Lions
Al Kelso	Center	13th	330	San Diego Chargers
Calvin Jones	Defensive back	15th	373	Denver Broncos
Kurt Matter	Defensive end	15th	390	Los Angeles Rams
