= Bill Cahill (American football) =

American football player (1951–2026)

No. 22
- Position: Defensive back

Personal information
- Born: May 5, 1951; Bellevue, Washington, U.S.
- Died: September 24, 2026 (aged 75)
- Listed height: 5 ft 11 in (1.80 m)
- Listed weight: 180 lb (82 kg)

Career information
- High school: Bellevue
- College: Washington
- NFL draft: 1973: 7th round, 158th overall pick

Career history
- Buffalo Bills (1973–1974)

Awards and highlights
- Second-team All-Pac-8 (1970)
- Stats at Pro Football Reference

William Blackburn Cahill (May 5, 1951 – September 24, 2026) was an American professional football player who was a defensive back for two seasons with the Buffalo Bills of the National Football League (NFL). He appeared in 19 games, from 1973 to 1974, mostly on special teams. He played college football for the Washington Huskies.

== Biography ==
Born and raised in Bellevue, Washington, a suburb east of Seattle, Cahill graduated from Bellevue High School in 1969 and played college football at the University of Washington in Seattle under head coach Jim Owens. In his senior season in 1972, he was co-captain with quarterback Sonny Sixkiller, and he was selected in the seventh round of the 1973 NFL draft by the New Orleans Saints.

After football, Cahill worked in production management for Boeing in the Seattle area. He died after a long illness on September 24, 2026, at the age of 75.
