= 1972 Stanford Cardinals football team =

American college football season

1972 Stanford Cardinals football
- Conference: Pacific-8 Conference
- Record: 6–5 (2–5 Pac-8)
- Head coach: Jack Christiansen (1st season)
- Offensive coordinator: Robert A. Jones (1st season)
- Defensive coordinator: Norb Hecker (1st season)
- Home stadium: Stanford Stadium

1972 Pacific-8 Conference football standings
	Conf.					Overall
Team	W		L		T	W		L		T
No. 1 USC $	7	–	0	–	0	12	–	0	–	0
No. 15 UCLA	5	–	2	–	0	8	–	3	–	0
No. 19 Washington State	4	–	3	–	0	7	–	4	–	0
Washington	4	–	3	–	0	8	–	3	–	0
California	3	–	4	–	0	3	–	8	–	0
Oregon	2	–	5	–	0	5	–	6	–	0
Stanford	2	–	5	–	0	6	–	5	–	0
Oregon State	1	–	6	–	0	2	–	9	–	0
$ – Conference champion; Rankings from AP Poll

The 1972 Stanford Cardinals football team represented Stanford University in the 1972 NCAA University Division football season. Following the departure of head coach John Ralston for the Denver Broncos in early January, defensive backs coach Jack Christiansen was promoted to head coach. Stanford finished at 6–5, but were 2–5 in Pacific-8 Conference play, tied for sixth.

The school changed its nickname from "Indians" to "Cardinals" in March after objections from Native American students and a vote by the student senate.

== Schedule ==
Date	Time	Opponent	Rank	Site	Result	Attendance	Source
September 16	1:30 p.m.	San Jose State*		Stanford Stadium; Stanford, CA (rivalry)	W 44–0	48,500	
September 23		at Duke*	No. 19	Wallace Wade Stadium; Durham, NC	W 10–6	24,600	
September 30	1:30 p.m.	No. 20 West Virginia*	No. 19	Stanford Stadium; Stanford, CA	W 41–35	56,000	
October 7	1:30 p.m.	No. 1 USC	No. 15	Stanford Stadium; Stanford, CA (rivalry)	L 21–30	84,000	
October 14	1:30 p.m.	No. 12 Washington	No. 17	Stanford Stadium; Stanford, CA	W 24–0	56,000	
October 21	1:30 p.m.	at Oregon	No. 13	Autzen Stadium; Eugene, OR	L 13–15	27,500	
October 28	1:30 p.m.	Oregon State		Stanford Stadium; Stanford, CA	W 17–11	44,000	
November 4	1:32 p.m.	at No. 8 UCLA		Los Angeles Memorial Coliseum; Los Angeles, CA	L 23–28	47,276	
November 11	1:30 p.m.	at Washington State	No. 20	Martin Stadium; Pullman, WA	L 13–27	20,500	
November 18	1:33 p.m.	at California		California Memorial Stadium; Berkeley, CA (Big Game)	L 21–24	68,000	
December 2		at Hawaii*		Honolulu Stadium; Honolulu, HI	W 39–7	18,397	
*Non-conference game; Rankings from AP Poll released prior to the game; All times are in Pacific time

== Game summaries ==
=== Washington ===
Washington Huskies at Stanford Cardinals

Quarter	1	2	3	4	Total
Huskies	0	0	0	0	0
Cardinals	7	14	3	0	24

at Stanford Stadium • Stanford, California

- Date: October 14, 1972
- Game attendance: 56,000

Game information

First quarter

- STAN – Cross 23 yard pass from Boryla (Garcia kick). Stanford 7–0. Drive:

Second quarter

- STAN – Alvarado 30 yard pass from Boryla (Garcia kick). Stanford 14-0. Drive:
- STAN – M. Moore 13 yard pass from Murray (Garcia kick). Stanford 21-0. Drive:

Third quarter

- STAN – Garcia 32 yard field goal. Stanford 24-0. Drive:

Fourth quarter

- No scoring plays.

=== California ===
Stanford Cardinals at California Golden Bears

Quarter	1	2	3	4	Total
Cardinals	7	7	0	7	21
Golden Bears	0	3	8	13	24

at Memorial Stadium • Berkeley, California

- Date: November 18, 1972
- Game attendance: 68,000
- Eugene Register-Guard. 1972 Nov 19.

Game information

First quarter

- STAN – Eric Cross 24-yard pass from Mike Boryla (Steve Murray kick). Stanford 7–0. Drive:

Second quarter

- CAL – Ray Wersching 29-yard field goal. Stanford 7–3. Drive:
- STAN – Gordon Riegel 71-yard interception return (Steve Murray kick). Stanford 14–3.

Third quarter

- CAL – Syl Youngblood 4-yard run (pass good). Stanford 14–11. Drive:

Fourth quarter

- CAL – Syl Youngblood 6-yard run (Ray Wersching kick). Cal 18–14. Drive:
- STAN – Reggie Sanderson 3-yard run (Rod Garcia kick), 3:42. Stanford 21–18. Drive:
- CAL – Steve Sweeney 7-yard pass from Vince Ferragamo, 0:00. Cal 24–21. Drive: 64 yards.

Top rushers

- CAL – Steve Kemnitzer – 15 rushes, 60 yards

== Roster ==
1972 Stanford Cardinal football team roster
Players
Coaches
Offense

Pos.	#	Name	Class
WR		Don Alvarado
OL		Mike Askea
QB		Mike Boryla
RB		Scott Boughton
OL		Chuck Cordes
WR		Eric Cross
OL		Lee Fair
WR		Reggie Ishman
RB		Doug Jena
OL		Younger Klipper
RB		Scott Laidlaw
RB		Vic Lamanuzzi
WR		Miles Moore
QB, P		Dave Ottmar
OL		Bill Reid
OL		Keith Rowen
RB		Reggie Sanderson	Sr
TE		Bill Scott
TE		Glen Stone
RB		John Winesberry

Defense

Pos.	#	Name	Class
DB		John Blanchard
DB		Dennis Bragonier
DL		Roger Cowan
DL		Jim Ferguson
DB		John Ferguson
DL		Peter Hansel
DB		Charles McCloud
LB		Jim Merlo
LB		Pat Moore
DB		Gary Murray
DB, K		Steve Murray
DL		Pierre Perreault
LB		Dennis Peterson
DB		Randy Poltl
DL		Barry Reynolds
DL		Roger Stillwell

Special teams

Pos.	#	Name	Class
K		Rod Garcia

Head coach

- Jack Christiansen

Coordinators/assistant coaches

- Robert Jones – Offensive Coordinator & offensive line
- David Currey – Offensive back
- Pete Kettela – Receivers
- Norb Hecker – Defensive Coordinator & defensive line
- Ray Handley – Linebacker
- George Seifert – Defensive back
- Hudson Houck – Assistant
- Bill Moultrie – Special Teams Coordinator

Legend

- (C) Team captain
- (S) Suspended
- (I) Ineligible
- Injured
- Redshirt
