= Rod McNeill =

American football player (born 1951)

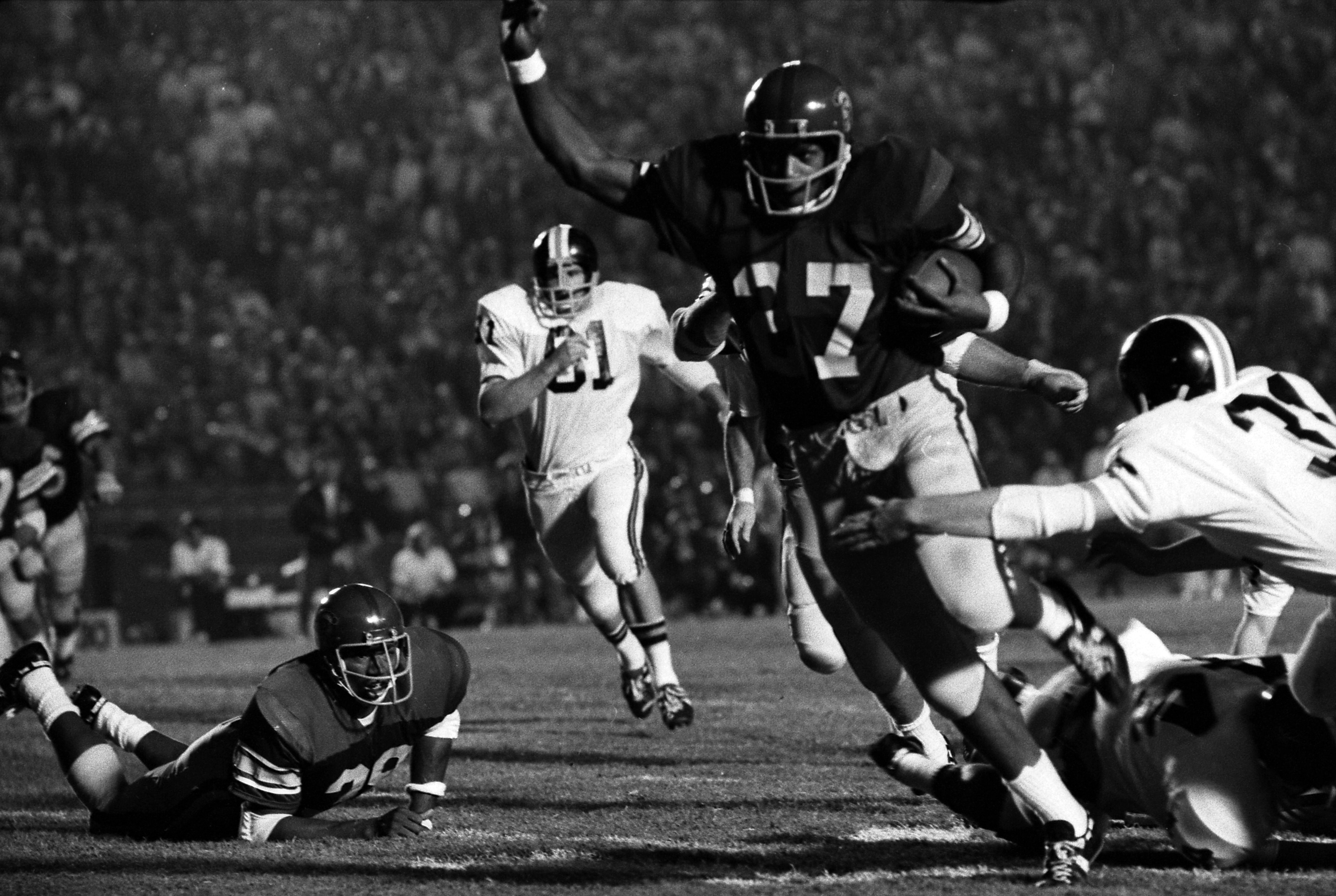
- McNeill scoring a touchdown for USC

No. 27, 22
- Position: Running back

Personal information
- Born: March 26, 1951 (age 75); Durham, North Carolina, U.S.
- Listed height: 6 ft 2 in (1.88 m)
- Listed weight: 219 lb (99 kg)

Career information
- High school: Baldwin Park (Baldwin Park, California)
- College: USC
- NFL draft: 1974: 4th round, 88th overall pick

Career history
- New Orleans Saints (1974–1975); Tampa Bay Buccaneers (1976)

Awards and highlights
- National champion (1972)

Career NFL statistics
- Rushing attempts: 110
- Rushing yards: 431
- Rushing TDs: 3
- Stats at Pro Football Reference

Rodney Carlyle McNeill (born March 26, 1951) is an American former professional football player who was a running back in the National Football League (NFL). He played college football for the USC Trojans. He was selected by the New Orleans Saints in the fourth round of the 1974 NFL draft. He spent two seasons with them before playing for the Tampa Bay Buccaneers in 1976. In the inaugural 1976 Tampa Bay Buccaneers season, he was the team's return specialist and running back.
