= Ray Braun =

American football coach

Biographical details
- Born: March 6, 1936 (age 90); Killdeer, North Dakota, U.S.

Coaching career (HC unless noted)
- c. 1965: Hellgate HS (MT)
- c. 1965: Baker HS (MT)
- 1967: North Dakota State (GA)
- 1968: Montana Tech
- 1969: South Dakota State (DC)
- 1970–1971: North Dakota State (assistant)
- 1972–1973: Washington State (DC)
- 1974–1975: Portland Storm/Thunder (DL)
- 1976–1978: Oregon State (DC)
- 1979–1980: Colorado (DL)
- 1981: Garden City
- 1982–1983: Oregon State (DC)
- 1988: Cleveland Browns (TE)
- 1990: Crescent Valley HS (OR)
- 1991–1992: Hermiston HS (OR)
- 1993–1994: Redmond HS (OR)

Head coaching record
- Overall: 2–6 (college); 3–6 (junior college)

Ray Braun (born March 6, 1936) is an American former football coach. He served as the head football coach at the Montana State School of Mines—now known as Montana Technological University–for one season, in 1968, compiling a record of 2–6. Before coming to Montana Tech, Braun was an assistant football coach at North Dakota State University and coached high school football at Hellgate High School in Missoula, Montana. Braun was the defensive coordinator at Washington State University under head coach Jim Sweeney from 1972 to 1973. He served two stints in the same capacity at Oregon State University, from 1976 to 1978 under Craig Fertig and 1982 to 1983 under Joe Avezzano. Braun also coached in the professional ranks, as an assistant with the Portland Storm/Thunder of the World Football League (WFL) from 1974 to 1975 and with the Cleveland Browns of the National Football League (NFL) in 1988. During the 1990s he coached at a number of high schools in Oregon.

== Head coaching record ==
=== College ===
Year	Team	Overall	Conference	Standing	Bowl/playoffs
Montana Tech Orediggers (Frontier Conference) (1968)
1968	Montana Tech	2–6	2–3	4th	
Montana Tech:		2–6	2–3		
Total:		2–6			

=== Junior college ===
Year	Team	Overall	Conference	Standing	Bowl/playoffs
Garden City Broncbusters (Kansas Jayhawk Community College Conference) (1981)
1981	Garden City	3–6	2–6	T–6th	
Garden City:		3–6	2–6		
Total:		3–6			
