= Reggie Sanderson =

American football player (born 1950)

No. 39
- Position: Running back

Personal information
- Born: November 4, 1950 (age 76); Galveston, Texas, U.S.
- Listed height: 5 ft 10 in (1.78 m)
- Listed weight: 206 lb (93 kg)

Career information
- High school: St. Francis (La Cañada Flintridge, California)
- College: Stanford
- NFL draft: 1973: undrafted

Career history
- Chicago Bears (1973); Chicago Fire (1974)
- Stats at Pro Football Reference

Reginald John Sanderson (born November 4, 1950) is an American former professional football player who was a running back for the Chicago Bears of National Football League (NFL). He played college football for the Stanford Cardinal.
