= Ahmad Rashad =

American football player and sportscaster (born 1949)

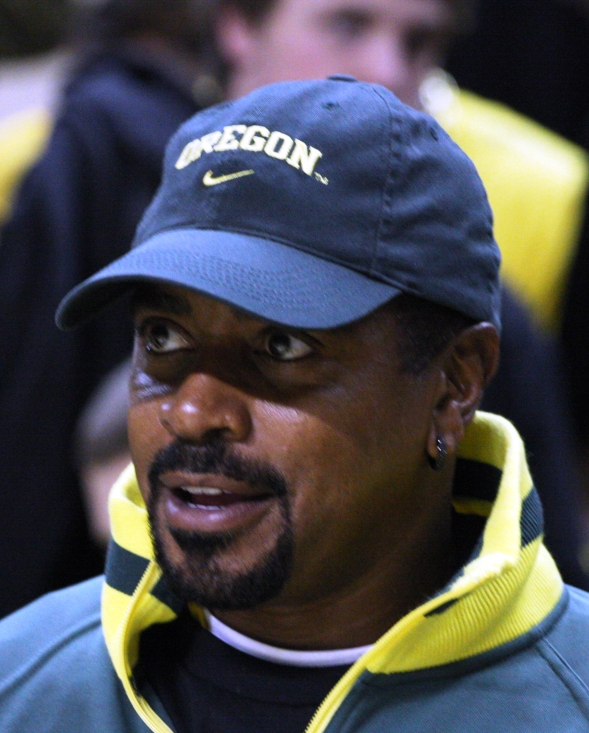
- Rashad in 2009

No. 28, 27
- Position: Wide receiver

Personal information
- Born: November 19, 1949 (age 76); Portland, Oregon, U.S.
- Listed height: 6 ft 2 in (1.88 m)
- Listed weight: 205 lb (93 kg)

Career information
- High school: Mount Tahoma (Tacoma, Washington)
- College: Oregon (1968–1971)
- NFL draft: 1972: 1st round, 4th overall pick

Career history
- St. Louis Cardinals (1972–1973); Buffalo Bills (1974–1975); Minnesota Vikings (1976–1982)

Awards and highlights
- Second-team All-Pro (1979); 4× Pro Bowl (1978–1981); 50 Greatest Vikings; Minnesota Vikings Ring of Honor; Minnesota Vikings 25th Anniversary Team; Minnesota Vikings 40th Anniversary Team; First-team All-American (1971); 3× First-team All-Pac-8 (1969, 1970, 1971)

Career NFL statistics
- Receptions: 495
- Receiving yards: 6,831
- Receiving touchdowns: 44
- Stats at Pro Football Reference
- College Football Hall of Fame

Ahmad Rashad (/əˈmɑːd rəˈʃɑːd/ ə-MAHD rə-SHAHD; born Robert Earl Moore; November 19, 1949) is an American sportscaster and former professional football wide receiver. He was the fourth overall selection of the 1972 NFL draft, taken by the St. Louis Cardinals. He was known as Bobby Moore before changing his name in 1973.

Recruited after high school as a wide receiver by the University of Oregon, he played for the Oregon Ducks. He moved to the running back position and was named to the 1971 College Football All-America Team at that position.

He became professional after being drafted by the Cardinals. Rashad returned to playing as wide receiver, and played for the Cardinals for two seasons. After being traded to the Buffalo Bills in 1974, and sitting out the 1975 season with a knee injury, he signed with the Seattle Seahawks before the 1976 season. They traded him shortly thereafter to the Minnesota Vikings (1976–1982), where he earned four Pro Bowl selections from 1978 to 1981.

Following his retirement from football, Rashad transitioned to television. He worked as a studio analyst, game reporter, and anchor for several sports. Rashad was a panellist on the NFL Live pregame show for NBC, and also notably hosted the National Basketball Association weekly digest shows NBA Inside Stuff (1990–2004) and NBA Access with Ahmad Rashad (2005–2011).

He has appeared as a fictionalized version of himself as a television sports personality in several films and television shows. In addition, he has hosted several non-sports related game shows and reality television shows. As of 2021, he was a member of the digital content team for the New York Knicks, filming videos for their YouTube channel, as well as emceeing events for the team in Madison Square Garden.

== Early life ==
Born Robert Earl Moore in 1949 in Portland, Oregon, he moved with his family to Tacoma, Washington. There he played high school football. Rashad graduated from Mount Tahoma High School and accepted an athletic scholarship to the University of Oregon in Eugene. He played football for the Ducks under head coach Jerry Frei, became a member of Omega Psi Phi fraternity, and majored in elementary education at Oregon.

During his junior year in college, Rashad had legal issues in Portland. He was charged with felony theft in November 1970. He pleaded guilty to a reduced charge, a misdemeanor, in early 1971.

In 1972, Moore converted from Pentecostalism to Islam. He had started to study Islam in college. A year later, Bobby Moore legally changed his name to Ahmad Rashād, which means "admirable one led to truth" in Arabic. He adopted his last name from his Egyptian-American mentor, biochemist Rashad Khalifa, with whom he studied Arabic. Khalifa was assassinated in 1990.

== Football career ==
At Oregon, Moore played wide receiver and wingback as a sophomore in 1969 and made the all-conference team. He moved to running back, where he was an All-American in 1971—in the same backfield with quarterback Dan Fouts. In his final season with the Ducks (1971), he rushed for 1,211 yards, caught 32 passes for 324 yards, and scored 10 touchdowns. He finished his three seasons of college football with 2,036 rushing yards, 131 receptions for 1,565 yards, and 36 touchdowns. At the time Moore left Oregon, his rushing yards, receptions, and 226 points were all school records.

Moore was the fourth player selected in the 1972 NFL draft, taken by the St. Louis Cardinals. He made the UPI all-rookie team in 1972, but second-year head coach Bob Hollway was fired after a 4–9–1 season. Don Coryell was the new head coach in 1973.

He traded Rashad, as he was then known, after that season to the Buffalo Bills for backup quarterback Dennis Shaw. In Buffalo, Rashad roomed on the road with O. J. Simpson in 1974. He missed the 1975 season after a knee injury in the final pre-season game.

Rashad was in the training camp of the expansion Seattle Seahawks, after signing as a free agent. He was traded days before the start of the 1976 regular season, sent to the Minnesota Vikings for a future draft pick. He failed the Vikings' physical, but was kept on the team due to the actions of quarterback Fran Tarkenton. The Vikings made it back to the Super Bowl that season, their last appearance to date.

During his professional football career, Rashad caught 495 passes for 6,831 yards and 44 touchdowns, while also rushing for 52 yards. The standout catch of his career came in a December 1980 game against the Cleveland Browns. Vikings quarterback Tommy Kramer threw a Hail Mary pass to Rashad that resulted in a come-from-behind 28–23 victory and a Central Division title for the Vikings. This became known as "The Miracle at the Met", or, alternatively, "The Miracle Catch". Rashad also has the distinction of the longest play from scrimmage that didn't score a touchdown: 98 yards in a 1972 game against the Rams.

Rashad replaced John Gilliam as receiver with both the St. Louis and Minnesota teams. In 1992 Rashad was named to Oregon's Hall of Fame and to the College Football Hall of Fame on May 9, 2007.

== Broadcasting and television career ==
After his football career, Rashad covered NFL, NBA, and MLB televised contests as a studio anchor and game reporter for NBC and ABC, and hosted NBA Inside Stuff for 16 seasons. He also has hosted the video-clip show Real TV in 2000, the reality show Celebrity Mole, the game show Caesars Challenge along with co-host Dan Doherty, NBA Access with Ahmad Rashad on the ABC network, and the first season of Game Show Network's Tug of Words. Samantha Harris replaced him for the second season of Tug of Words.

He starred in an episode of Monsters. Rashad has also guest starred on several TV shows, mainly ones that starred his then-wife Phylicia Allen Rashad. In 1988, he filled in for Robb Weller on the weekend edition of Entertainment Tonight (then known as Entertainment This Week). He used to interview long-time friend Michael Jordan frequently while he was at NBC. In early 2013, he became a panelist on the daily talk show Morning Drive on the Golf Channel, but left that summer. Rashad has narrated the yearly highlight films for NBA championship teams since 2012.

As of May 2021, Rashad now works for the New York Knicks as a member of their digital content team, making videos for the team's YouTube channel (including sit-down interviews with members of the roster as well as historical retrospectives) as well as emceeing events for the team at Madison Square Garden.

== Basketball career ==
Right before the launch of NBA Inside Stuff in 1990, Rashad, who was 40 years old at the time, signed a two-day contract with the Philadelphia 76ers. As the show wanted to use Rashad playing in the NBA as a promotion, he was allowed to practice with the team and play in an NBA preseason game against the Minnesota Timberwolves the next day. Rashad was known for his athleticism, as evidenced by him playing multiple offensive positions in his football career. He became a multi-sport athlete, albeit 8 years after his retirement from pro sports. It was the first preseason game ever to be played at the newly built Target Center and was in front of a crowd of 18,296. Many fans came to the game to support Rashad because of his career as a Viking.

He was subbed on for Hersey Hawkins and, in the first play of his NBA career, he gave up an and-one shooting foul to Tony Campbell. During an ensuing timeout, head coach Jim Lynam drew up a play for Rashad to run across the baseline for an open look. Rashad knocked down the 20-foot shot and scored the first and only points of his NBA career. Remembering the moment in a voiceover, Rashad was ecstatic, "I definitely replayed this one in my head for quite some time. My teammates set me up on the left side, and when everything was on the line, I nailed it." Rashad was not as good defensively, as he allowed Campbell and the Timberwolves to bring an 11-point deficit down to 5. But the 76ers pulled off a 102–96 win, giving Rashad a perfect record in the NBA, as well as a perfect 1.000 FG%, as he technically made every single shot he ever took.

After the game, Rashad's performance was applauded by multiple teammates and coaches, including Hall of Fame teammate Charles Barkley. He had previously expressed doubts about Rashad, but said that "he made it, and that's all that matters." Rick Mahorn, another teammate, said "What the hell, his two points really made a difference."

In a post-game interview, Rashad announced his retirement from the game of basketball, and he was waived from the team.

== Career statistics ==
=== NFL ===
Legend
	Led the league
**Bold**	Career high

==== Regular season ====
Year	Team	Games		Receiving				
Year	Team	GP	GS	Rec	Yds	Avg	Lng	TD
1972	STL	14	13	29	500	**17.2**	**98**	3
1973	STL	13	10	30	409	13.6	65	3
1974	BUF	14	14	36	433	12.0	29	4
1976	MIN	13	11	53	671	12.7	47	3
1977	MIN	14	14	51	681	13.4	48	2
1978	MIN	**16**	**16**	66	769	11.7	58	8
1979	MIN	**16**	**16**	**80**	**1,156**	14.5	52	**9**
1980	MIN	**16**	**16**	69	1,095	15.9	76	5
1981	MIN	**16**	15	58	884	15.2	53	7
1982	MIN	7	6	23	233	10.1	21	0
		139	131	495	6,831	13.8	98	44

==== Playoffs ====
Year	Team	Games		Receiving				
Year	Team	GP	GS	Rec	Yds	Avg	Lng	TD
1974	BUF	1	1	1	25	**25.0**	25	0
1976	MIN	**3**	**3**	**7**	**116**	16.6	**35**	0
1977	MIN	2	2	5	55	11.0	25	0
1978	MIN	1	1	**7**	84	12.0	31	**1**
1980	MIN	1	1	1	23	23.0	23	0
		8	8	21	303	14.4	35	1

=== NBA ===
Legend
GP	Games played	GS	Games started	MPG	Minutes per game
FG%	Field goal percentage	3P%	3-point field goal percentage	FT%	Free throw percentage
RPG	Rebounds per game	APG	Assists per game	SPG	Steals per game
BPG	Blocks per game	PPG	Points per game	**Bold**	Career high

==== Preseason ====
Year	Team	GP	GS	MPG	FG%	3P%	FT%	RPG	APG	SPG	BPG	PPG
1990–91	Philadelphia	**1**	0	**2.5**	**1.000**	.000	.000	0.0	0.0	0.0	0.0	**2.0**

== Career highlights ==
NFL

- Second-team All-Pro (1979)
- 4× Pro Bowl (1978–1981)
- Pro Bowl MVP (1978)
- 50 Greatest Vikings
- Minnesota Vikings Ring of Honor
- Minnesota Vikings 25th Anniversary Team
- Minnesota Vikings 40th Anniversary Team

College

- First-team All-American (1971)
- 3× First-team All-Pac-8 (1969, 1970, 1971)

Other

- Oregon Sports Hall of Fame

== Personal life ==
Rashad has been married five times and divorced four. He has fathered a total of six children, including a son, Geoffrey Simmons, born to his high school girlfriend Melody Neal. The boy was put up for adoption in 1967. After he turned 18, he contacted his father through Amara (formerly the Medina Adoption Agency) in 2005, and the pair met for the first time. Simmons also had learned that his biological mother, Melody Neal, died from cancer in 1991.

In 1969, Rashad married for the first time, to Deidre Waters. They had a daughter, Keva, born in 1970. That year Rashad also fathered a son, Sean, born to another woman.

After divorcing his first wife, in 1976, Rashad married his second wife, Matilda Johnson. They had two children together, daughter Maiyisha (born in 1976) and son Ahmad Jr. (born in 1978). They divorced in 1979.

In 1985, Rashad married actress Phylicia Ayers-Allen, known for her work on The Cosby Show. He proposed to her earlier that year on national television during the pregame show of NBC's broadcast of the Thanksgiving Day football game, between the Detroit Lions and the New York Jets. It was the third marriage for each of them. Rashad gained a stepson Billy Bowles (born 1973 during her first marriage). After a year of marriage, they had a daughter together, Condola Phylea Rashad, named after his mother. In 2001, after nearly sixteen years of marriage, they divorced.

In 2007, Rashad married his fourth wife, Nancy Sale Johnson. (She had divorced from Woody Johnson, Johnson & Johnson billionaire heir and New York Jets owner). She brought three daughters to the marriage: Casey Johnson (1979–2010), Jamie Johnson (b. 1982), and Daisy Johnson (b. 1987). After Casey died, the couple adopted her daughter (Sale Johnson's granddaughter), Ava-Monroe Johnson (born August 14, 2006). Rashad and Johnson divorced in 2013.

In 2016, Rashad married Ana Luz Rodriguez-Paz, a psychologist in South Florida.

Media offices
Preceded by First Host	Host of Tug of Words; Season 1 (2021–2022)	Succeeded by Samantha Harris (Season 2)
