= Samantha Harris =

American television host, model and actress (b. 1973)

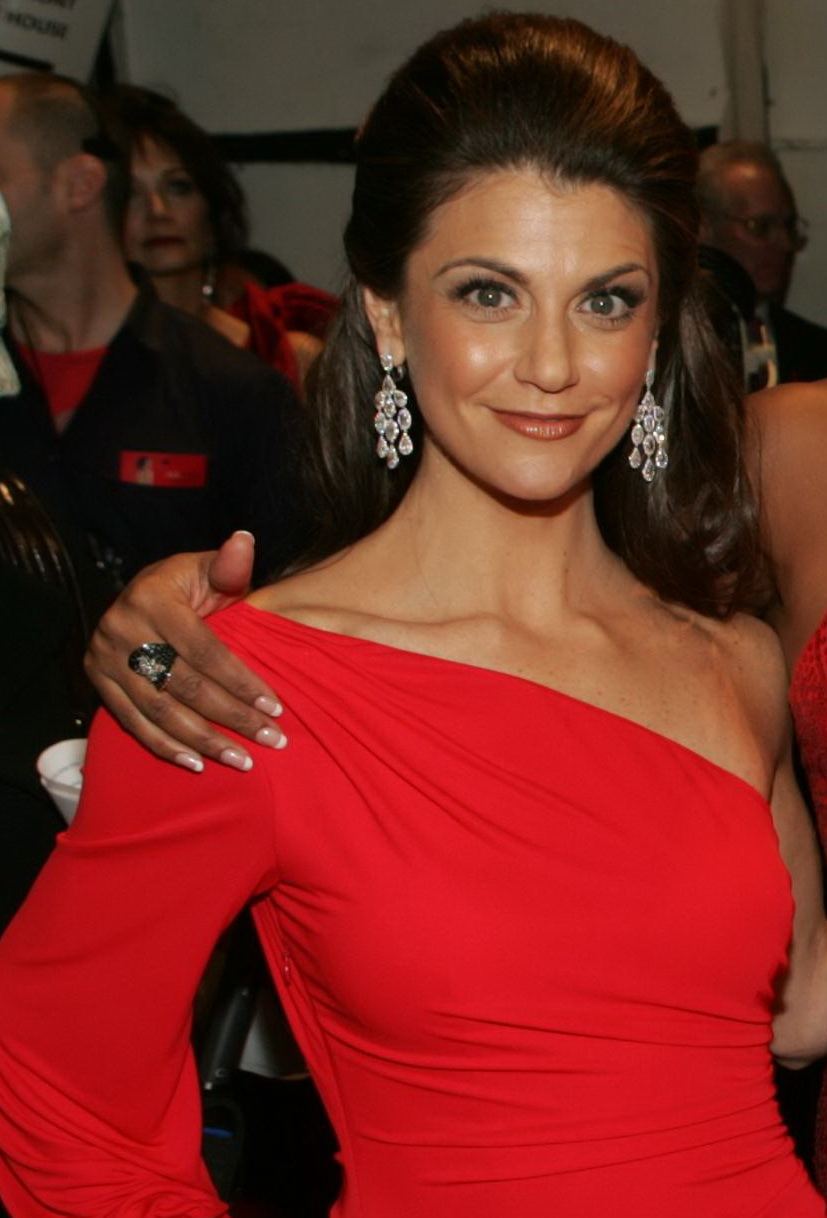
- Samantha Harris backstage at the 2009 Heart Truth fashion show
- Born: Samantha Harris Shapiro; November 27, 1973 (age 52); Hopkins, Minnesota, U.S.
- Education: Northwestern University
- Occupations: Television presenter; model; entertainment reporter; actress
- Years active: 1996–present
- Notable work: Host or co-host of: Dancing with the Stars; The Next Joe Millionaire; Access Hollywood; The View
- Spouse: Michael Hess (m. 2004)
- Children: 2

Samantha Harris (born Samantha Harris Shapiro; November 27, 1973) is an American television presenter, model, and entertainment reporter and actress, known as the co-host of seasons two through nine of Dancing with the Stars with Tom Bergeron. From 2010–12, she was a correspondent at Entertainment Tonight. In September 2015, she returned to the program as a co-anchor for the weekend edition, remaining until 2016.

== Early life ==
Harris was born in Hopkins, Minnesota, to Richard, a rock 'n' roll promoter, and Bonnie (née Harris) Shapiro, a dancer. In 1982, her parents founded a renaissance festival, known as King Richard's Faire, which operates in Carver, Massachusetts, seasonally, which continues as of 2025. She had a Jewish upbringing. She graduated from Northwestern University.

== TV hosting ==
On December 16, 2008, Harris joined The Insider as a substitute host and correspondent. She had previously been a correspondent with E! Entertainment Television's E! News, and host of THS Investigates.

In addition to writing, producing and reporting daily for E! News, she co-hosted the network's live award-show coverage for the Oscars, Golden Globes and Emmys. She has also appeared as a special correspondent on Good Morning America. Prior to joining E!, Harris served as a weekend co-host for the infotainment show Extra, where she interviewed hundreds of celebrities and served as an anchor for the show's Las Vegas bureau.

Her best known hosting job was for Dancing with the Stars along with Tom Bergeron. She took over in 2006 for Lisa Canning. Her other hosting credits include Fox's The Next Joe Millionaire and AMC Access (the short-lived spinoff of Access Hollywood produced for AMC). Additionally, she also served as a guest co-host on The View. She hosted a week of Who Wants to Be a Millionaire shows on May 11–15, 2009.

Harris announced on January 28, 2010, that she would leave Dancing with the Stars to focus on other projects like her correspondent duties at The Insider and Entertainment Tonight.

Season 7 champion Brooke Burke replaced Harris as co-host in the spring 2010 season.

Harris replaced Ahmad Rashad as host of Game Show Network's Tug of Words for the show's second season, which premiered November 14, 2022.

== Acting work ==
Her film and television credits include D3: The Mighty Ducks, Drop Dead Gorgeous, Surviving Gilligan's Island (in which she portrayed the actress Dawn Wells), Reefer Madness, Beautiful, CSI: Crime Scene Investigation, among others.

She made her Broadway debut in 2009 as Roxie Hart in Chicago. She performed a six-week engagement in the long-running musical from July 7 through August 16 at the Ambassador Theatre. After her Broadway run, Harris played Roxie in the Greenville, SC, engagement of the national tour, August 18–23, at the Peace Center.

== Public image ==
Harris has been a three-time cover girl model for Muscle & Fitness: HERS, and for FHM, SELF, and SHAPE magazines, and in various ads and commercials. She was featured in the December 2006 issue of FHM magazine.

In November 2007, Harris was announced as the spokesperson for Palmer's Cocoa Butter Formula line, where she was featured in a national print and television campaign. That occurred as Harris won consecutive 2007 and 2008 Crown Awards for the "Best Hairstyle on Television" from voters at Super-Hair.Net.

== Personal life ==
Harris married Michael Hess in 2004. Harris gave birth to the couple's first daughter in 2007 and missed the season five premiere of Dancing with the Stars. She returned on October 15, 2007. Drew Lachey, winner of season two, filled in for the first three weeks of competition while Harris was out. Three years later, Harris delivered the couple's second daughter.

In April 2014, Harris announced that she was diagnosed with breast cancer and would undergo a double mastectomy. In October 2014, she announced that she was cancer free.

Media offices
Preceded by Lisa Canning	Co-Host of Dancing with the Stars; 2006–2009	Succeeded by Brooke Burke
Preceded by Ahmad Rashad (Season 1)	Host of Tug of Words; Season 2 (2022-present)	Succeeded by Incumbent
