= The Heart Truth =

Campaign meant to raise awareness of the risk of heart disease in women

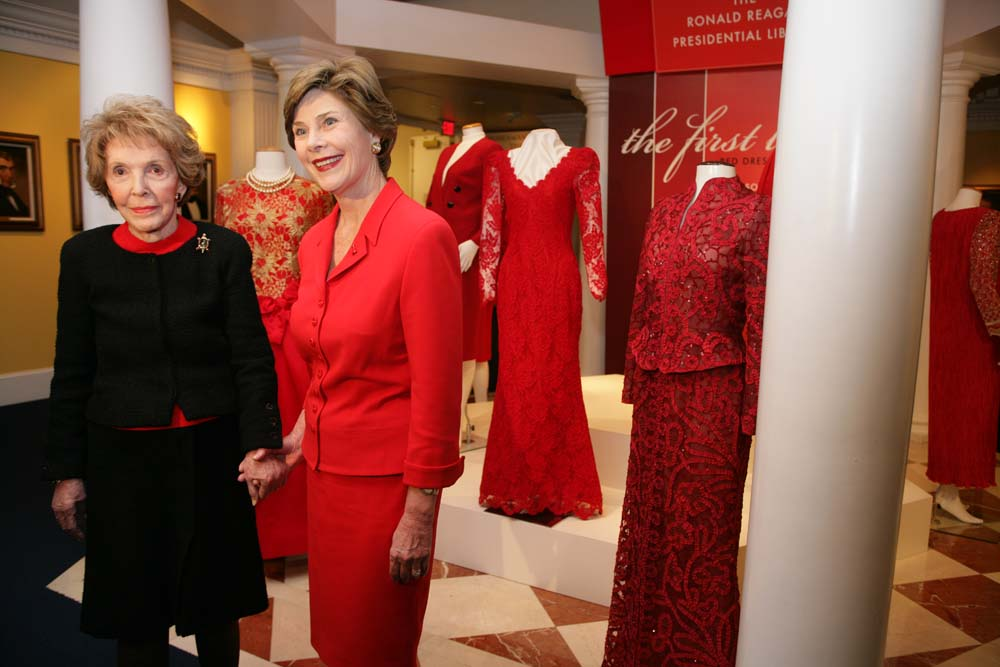
Former First Ladies Nancy Reagan (left) and Laura Bush (right) dedicate The Heart Truth First Ladies Red Dress Collection at the Ronald Reagan Presidential Library in Simi Valley, California on February 28, 2007

The Heart Truth is a campaign meant to raise awareness of the risk of heart disease in women. The campaign is sponsored in the United States by the National Heart, Lung, and Blood Institute, an organization of the United States Department of Health and Human Services; a similar campaign is promoted in Canada by the Heart and Stroke Foundation of Canada. It focuses mainly on educating women aged forty to sixty, as that is the time when the risk of heart disease begins to increase.

== Campaign history ==
The campaign began in March 2001 on recommendation from over seventy experts on the health of women. The research stressed the need to communicate to women about the risk of heart disease, and endorsed The Heart Truth as a means of doing so.

== Logo and marketing ==
The logo of the campaign is a red dress. It came into being as a way to attract attention to The Heart Truth, and eliminate perceptions that heart disease is an issue only for men. The dress reminds women to focus on their "outerselves", as well as their "innerselves", especially heart health.

The campaign has also conjured a National Wear Red Day, meant to take place on the first Friday of February annually.

== Events ==
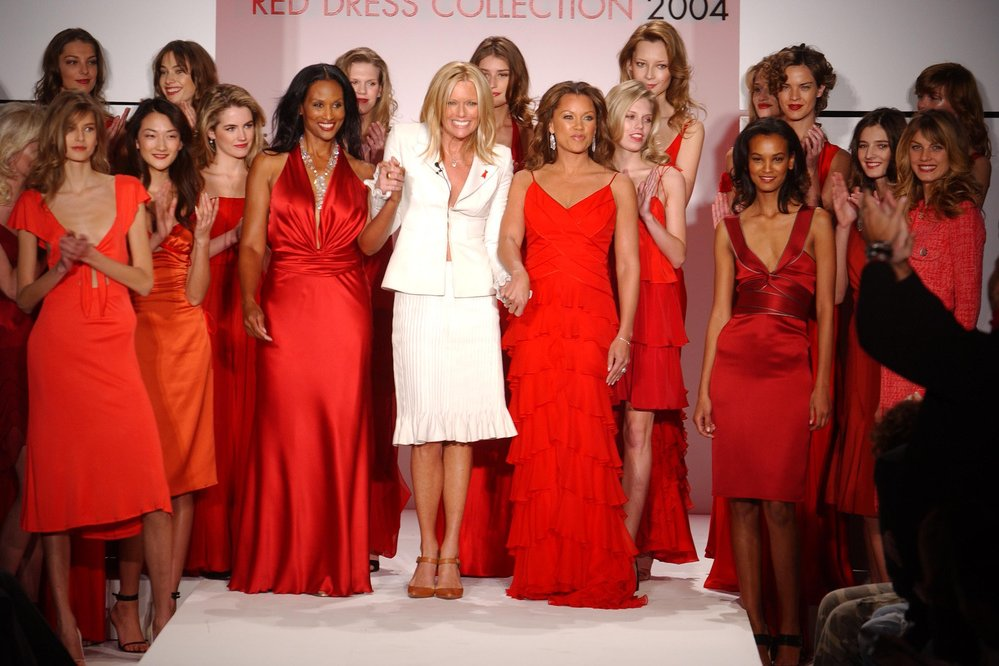
Group photo at the Red Dress Collection 2004

The Heart Truth has joined with the United States Federal Government and fashion industries, in an attempt to appeal to female audiences. Red dresses have been displayed across the country, primarily at New York's Fashion Week. The first Red Dress Collection Fashion Week took place in 2003 when nineteen designers, including Vera Wang, Oscar de la Renta, and Carmen Marc Valvo contributed dresses that were displayed in the Bryant Park Tents. Many fashion shows have been put on in recent years during the Fashion Week festivities; many famous celebrities have participated in walking the aisle, including Jenna Fischer, Sheryl Crow, Natalie Morales, Kelly Ripa, Debbie Harry, Venus Williams, Angela Bassett, Rachael Ray, Valerie Bertinelli, Christie Brinkley, Thalía, Vanessa Williams, Raven-Symoné, Allison Janney, Sara Ramirez, Billie Jean King, Katie Couric, Sarah, Duchess of York, Lindsay Lohan, LeAnn Rimes, Christina Milian, Fergie, Jordin Sparks, Ashanti, Hilary Duff, Mary Lynn Rajskub, Rose McGowan, and Eartha Kitt.

Laureen Harper, the wife of Canadian Prime Minister Stephen Harper, has been a supporter of the campaign and has served as guest of honor at the event at Nathan Phillips Square in Toronto, Ontario for many consecutive years.

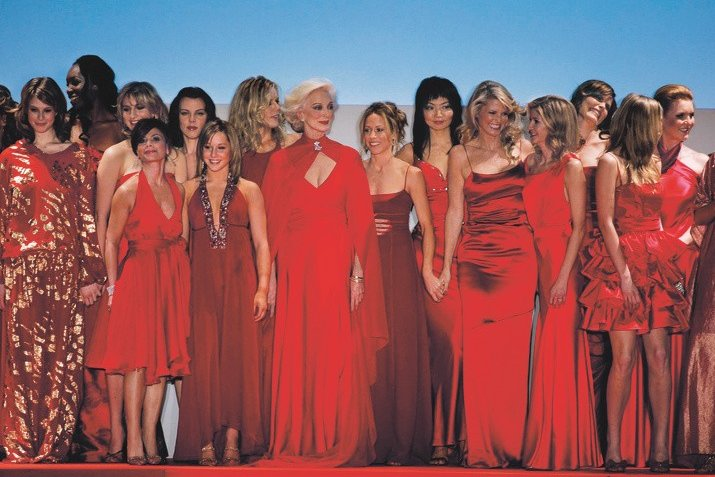
Group shot of the models from the 2005 Red Dress Collection

=== Laura Bush's involvement ===
Former First Lady Laura Bush has been the ambassador for The Heart Truth since 2003. She has led the federal government in giving women more information relating to heart disease. Bush has coordinated many events relating to The Heart Truth, including a White House ceremony in 2004, the Kennedy Center exhibit, the Reagan Library exhibit, and has participated in all Fashion Week events dating to 2003.

A signature component of Bush's involvement is her communication with women at hospital events featuring those living with heart disease. She promotes the campaign through various media interviews as well.

=== First Ladies Red Dress Collection ===
In May 2005, The Heart Truth constructed a special exhibition at the John F. Kennedy Center for the Performing Arts in Washington, D.C., known as the First Ladies Red Dress Collection. The collection featured seven red dresses worn by America's first ladies Lady Bird Johnson, Betty Ford, Rosalynn Carter, Nancy Reagan, Barbara Bush, Hillary Clinton, and Laura Bush. The exhibit was unveiled by Laura Bush, in the presence of many Congressional spouses and Cabinet secretaries.

In February 2007, The Heart Truth moved that exhibit to the Ronald Reagan Presidential Library in Simi Valley, California. There, the exhibit was opened by former First Lady Nancy Reagan along with television personality Larry King and Laura Bush. A conference was held at the library with leaders of the heart disease awareness movement as well as Bush and Reagan.

=== Heart Truth Red Dress Fashion Show 2013 ===
In February 2013, The Heart Truth presented a fashion show at the Hammerstein Ballroom in Midtown Manhattan, New York City. Celebrities who walked the runway included Minka Kelly, Soledad O'Brien, Wendy Williams, Brenda Strong, Kris Jenner, Jamie Chung, Toni Braxton, Kelly Osbourne, among others.

== Notable participants ==
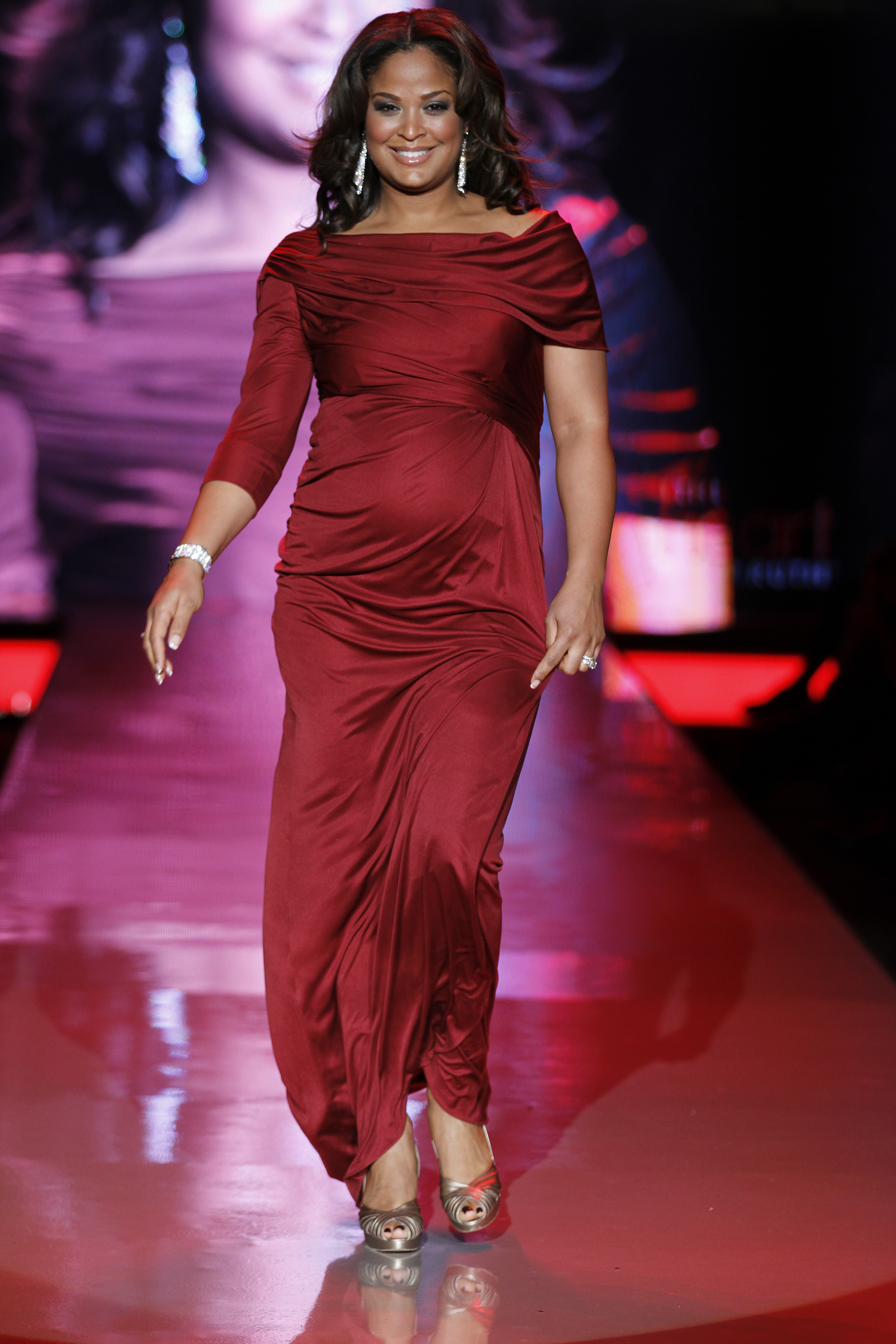
Laila Ali

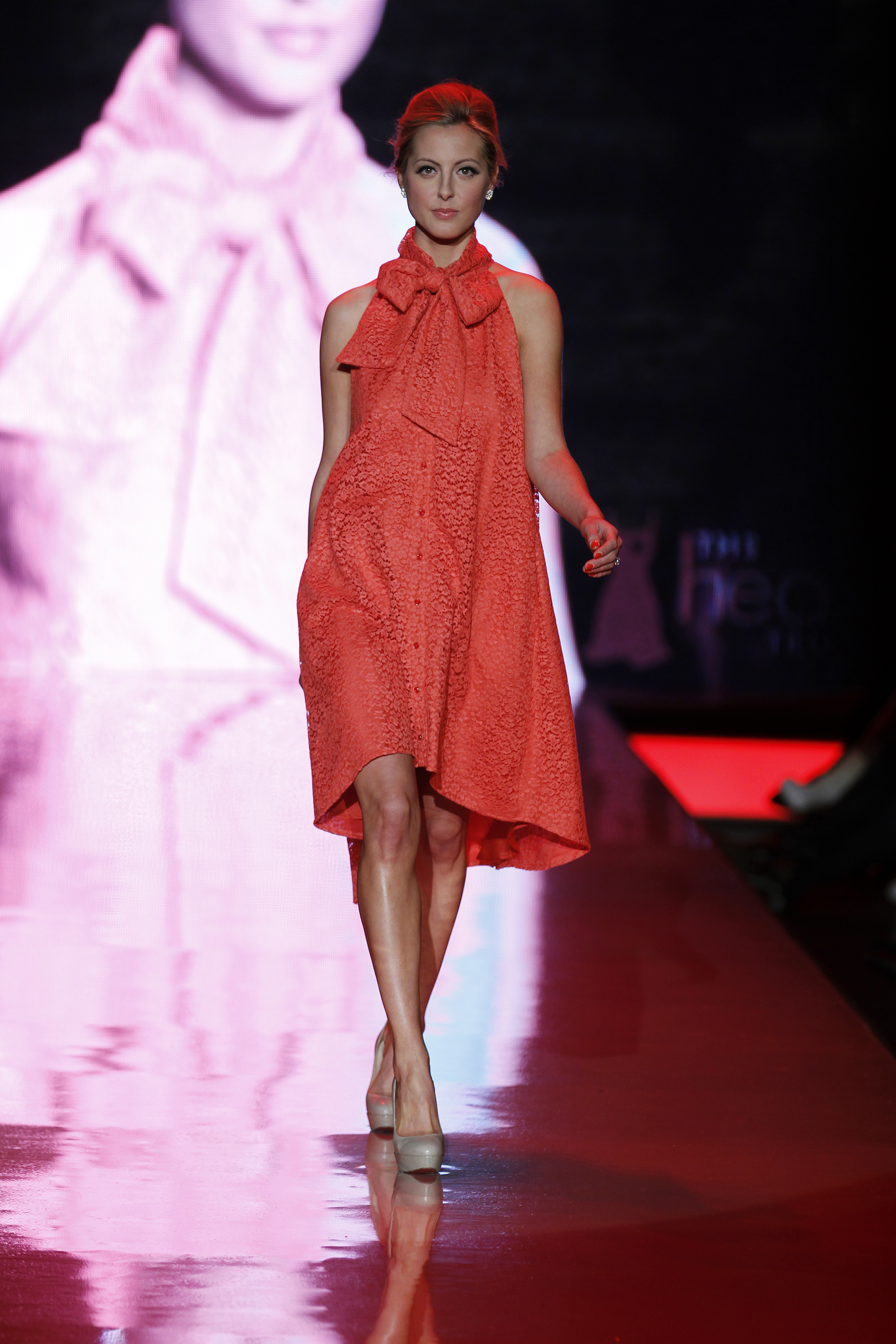
Eva Amurri

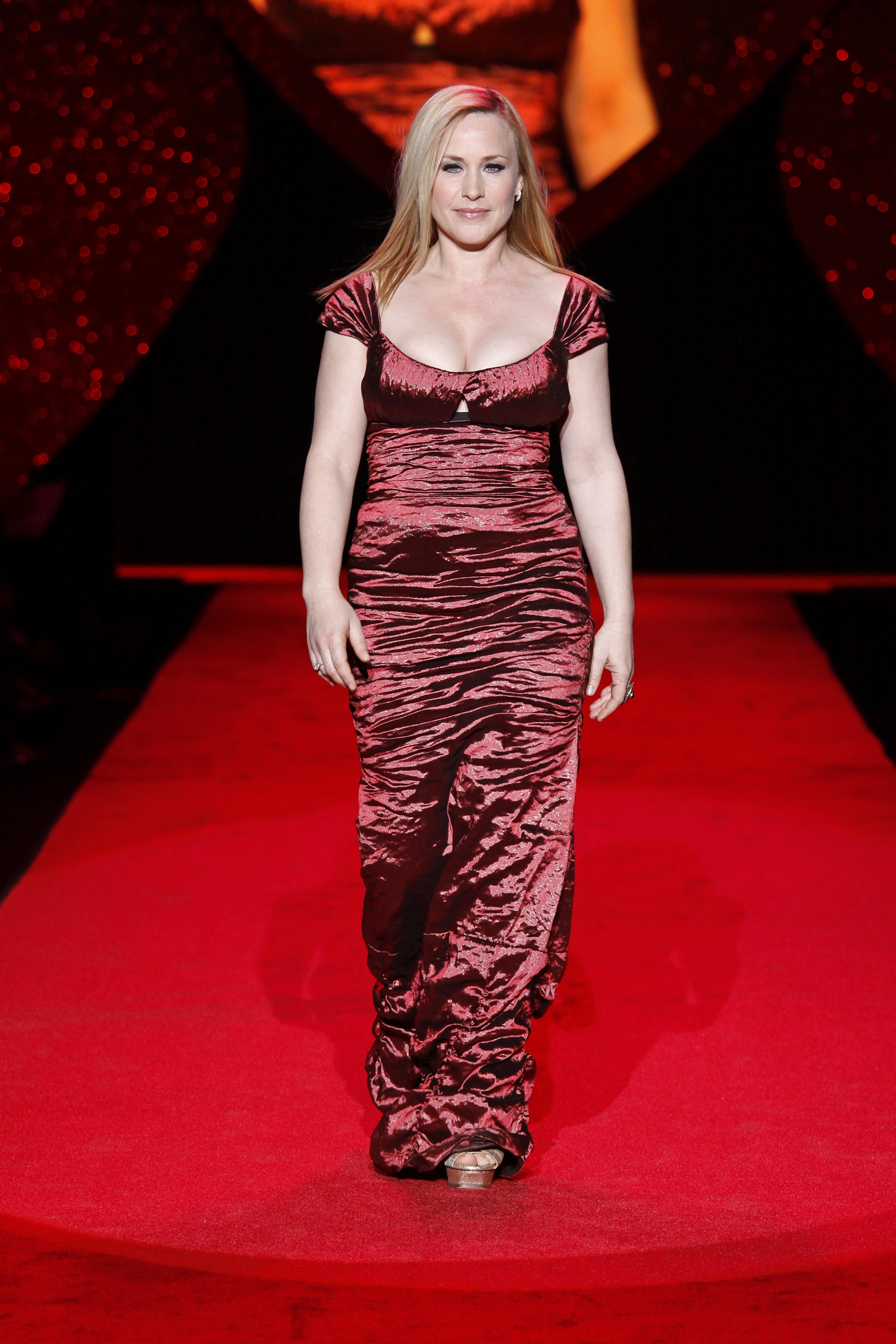
Patricia Arquette

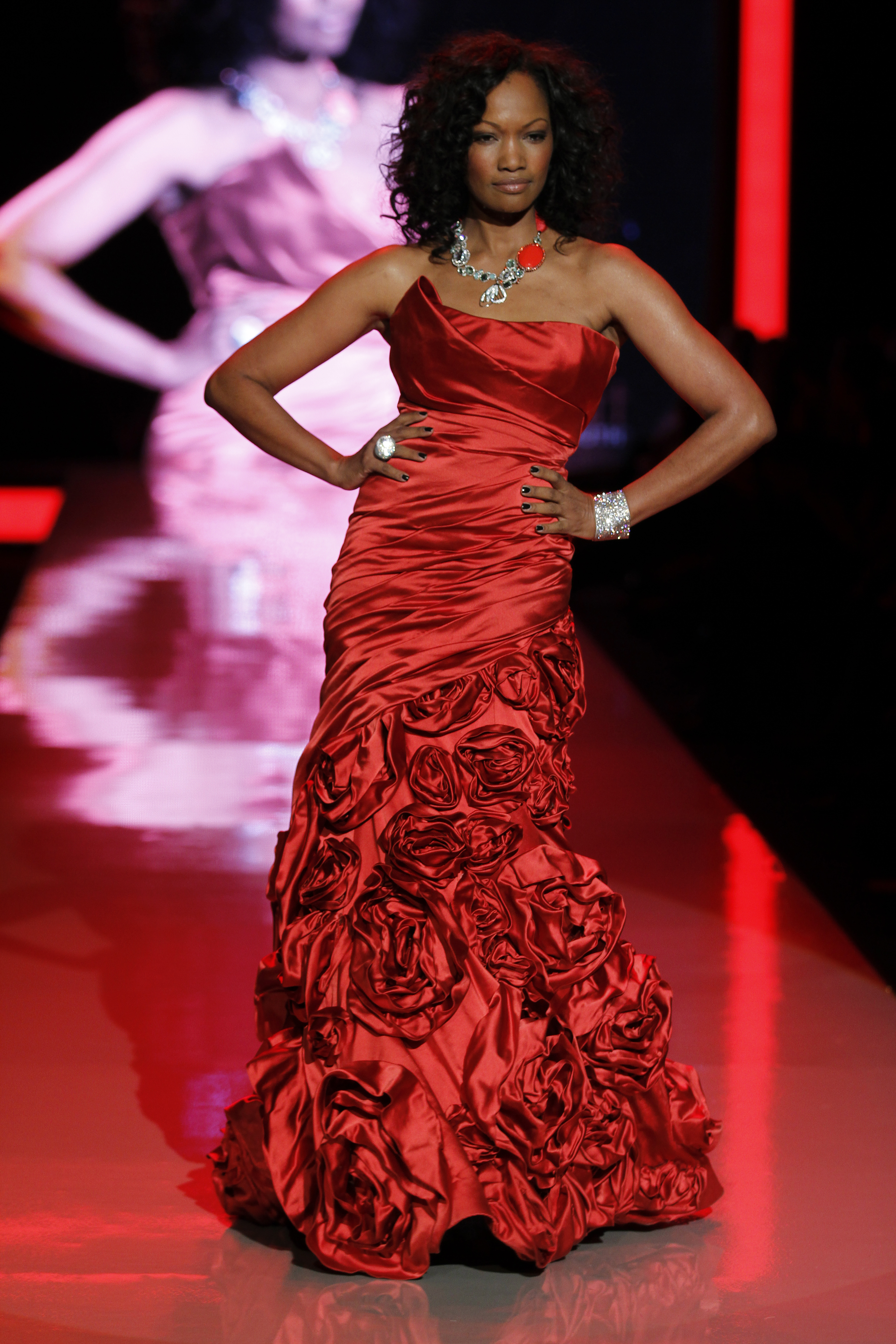
Garcelle Beauvais

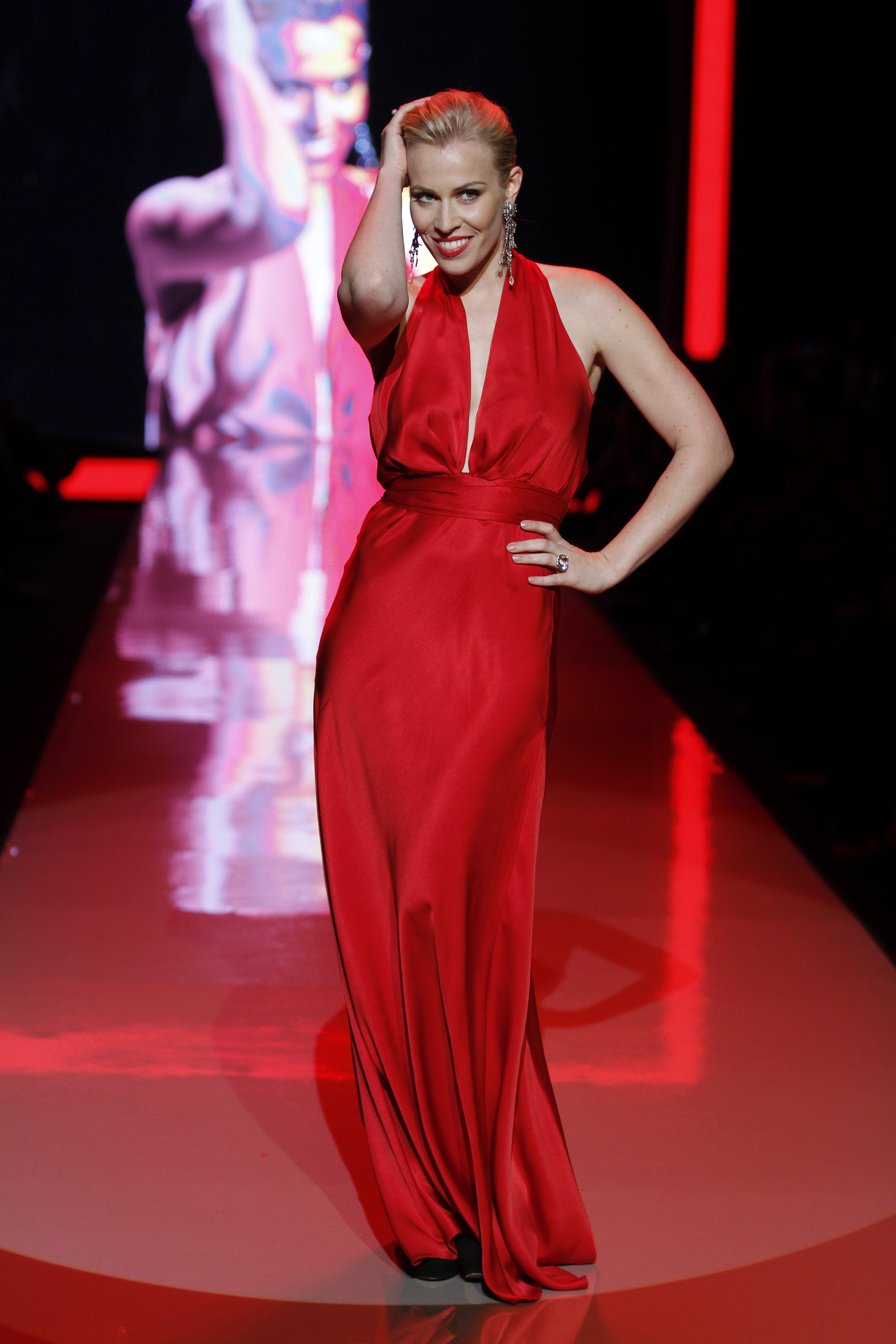
Natasha Bedingfield

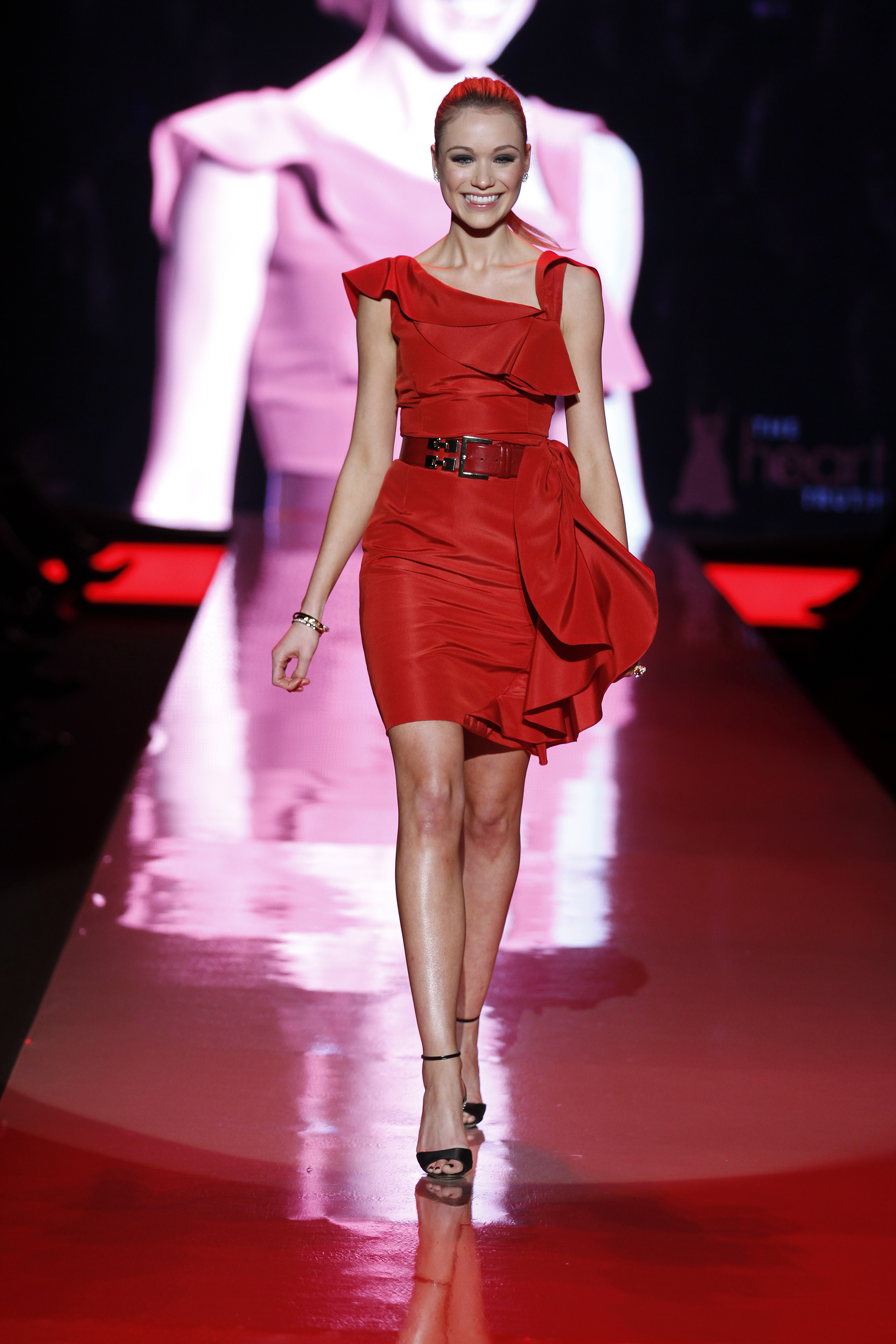
Katrina Bowden

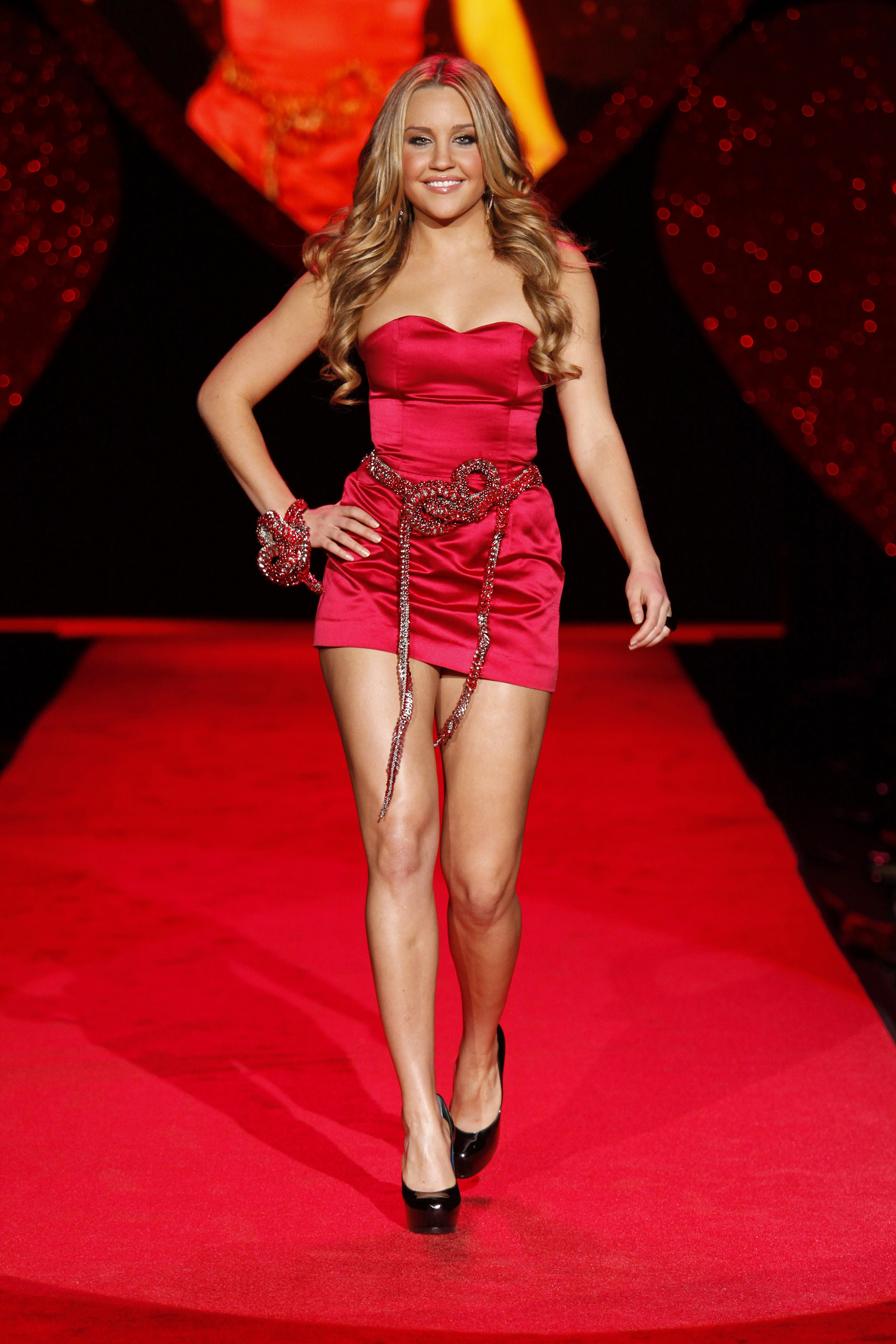
Amanda Bynes

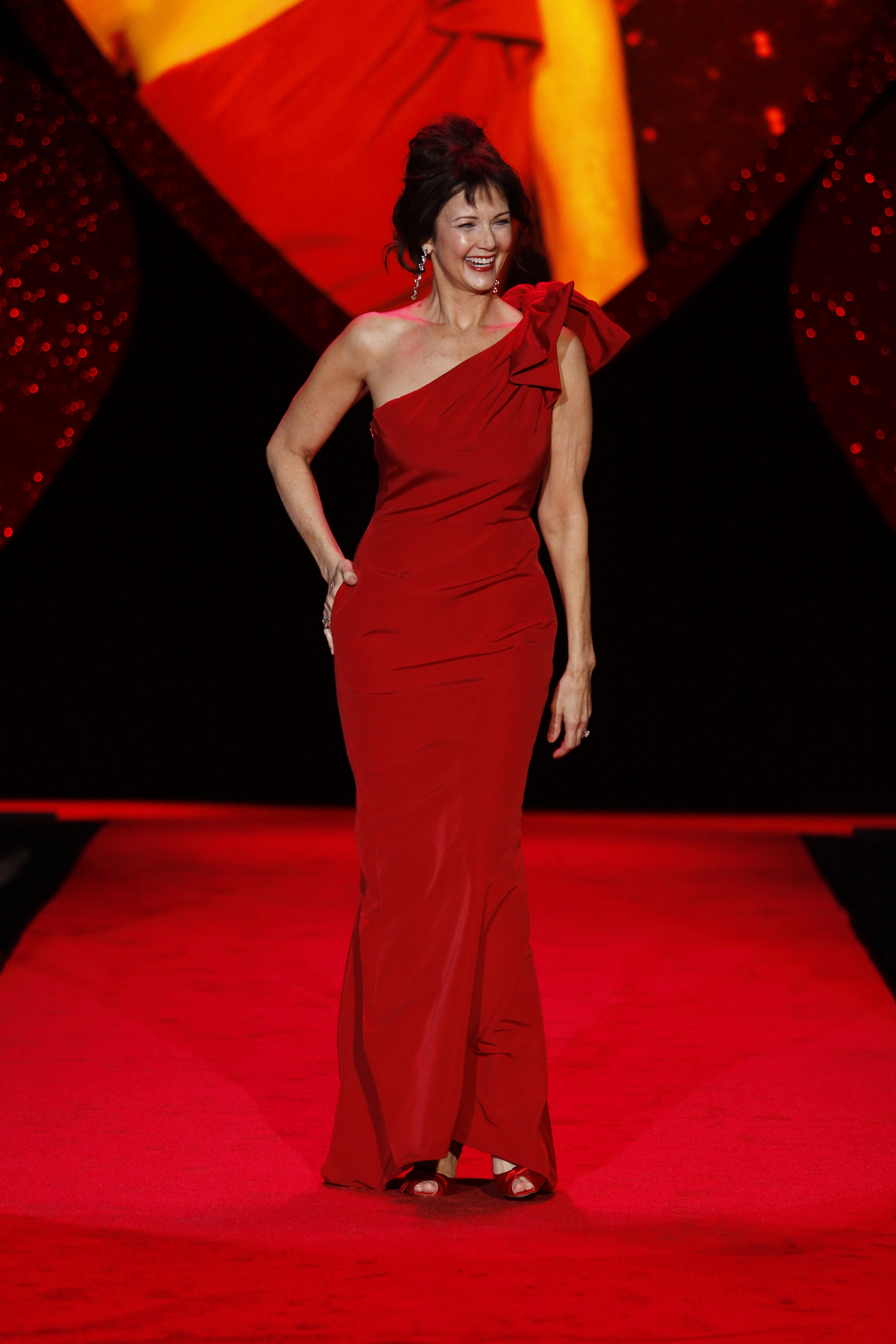
Lynda Carter

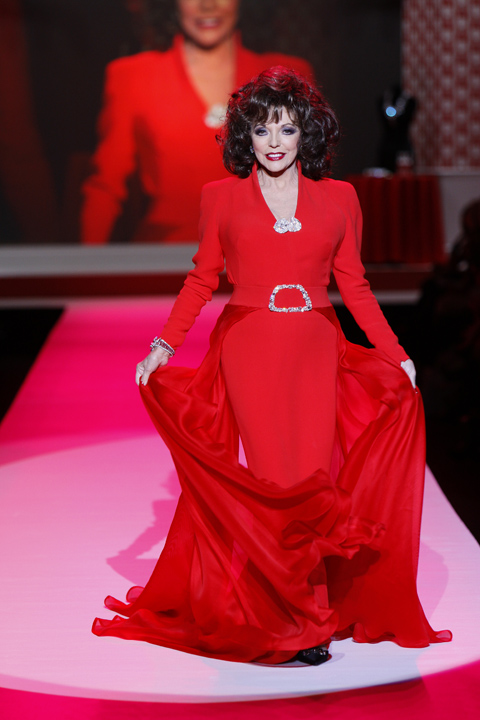
Joan Collins

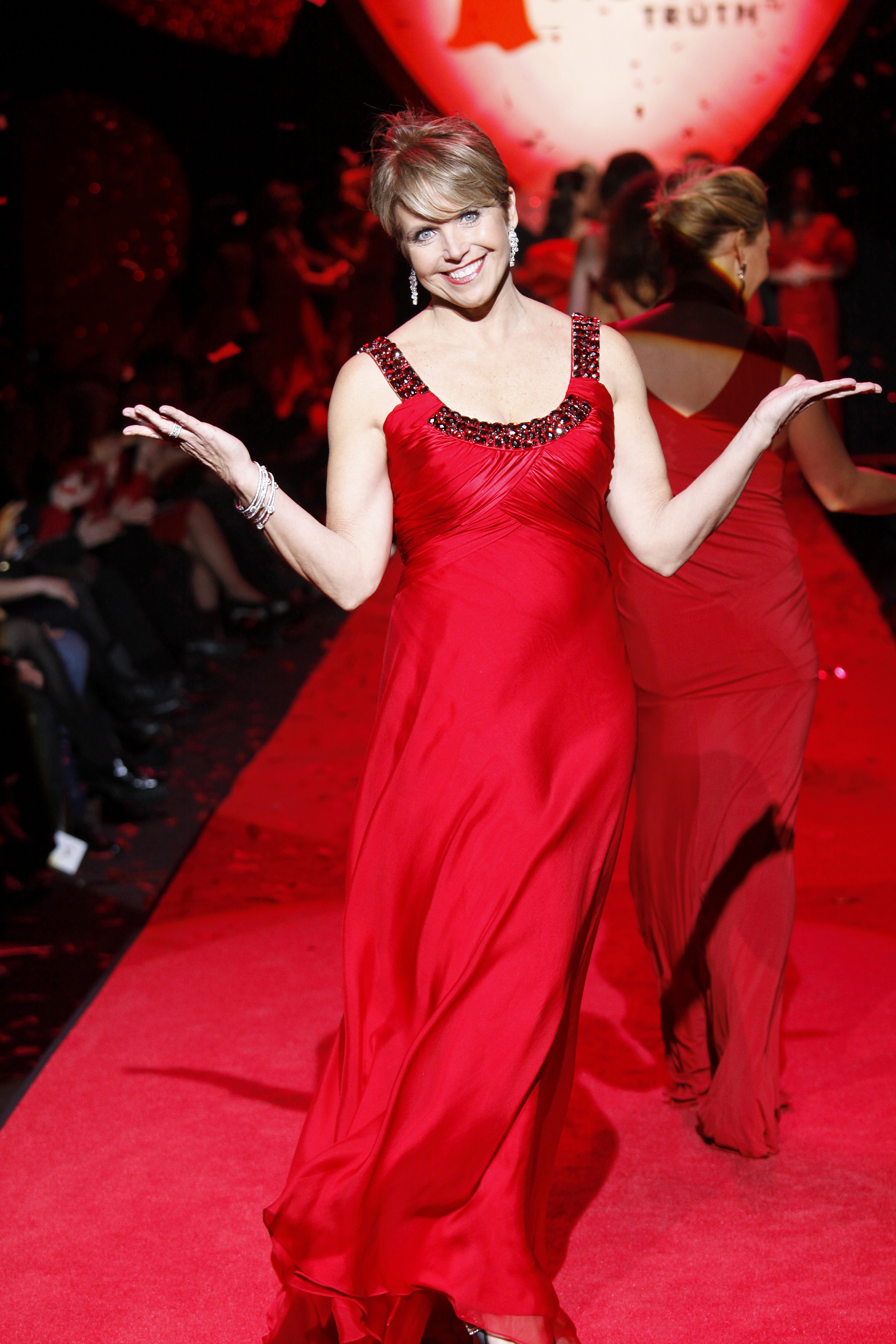
Katie Couric

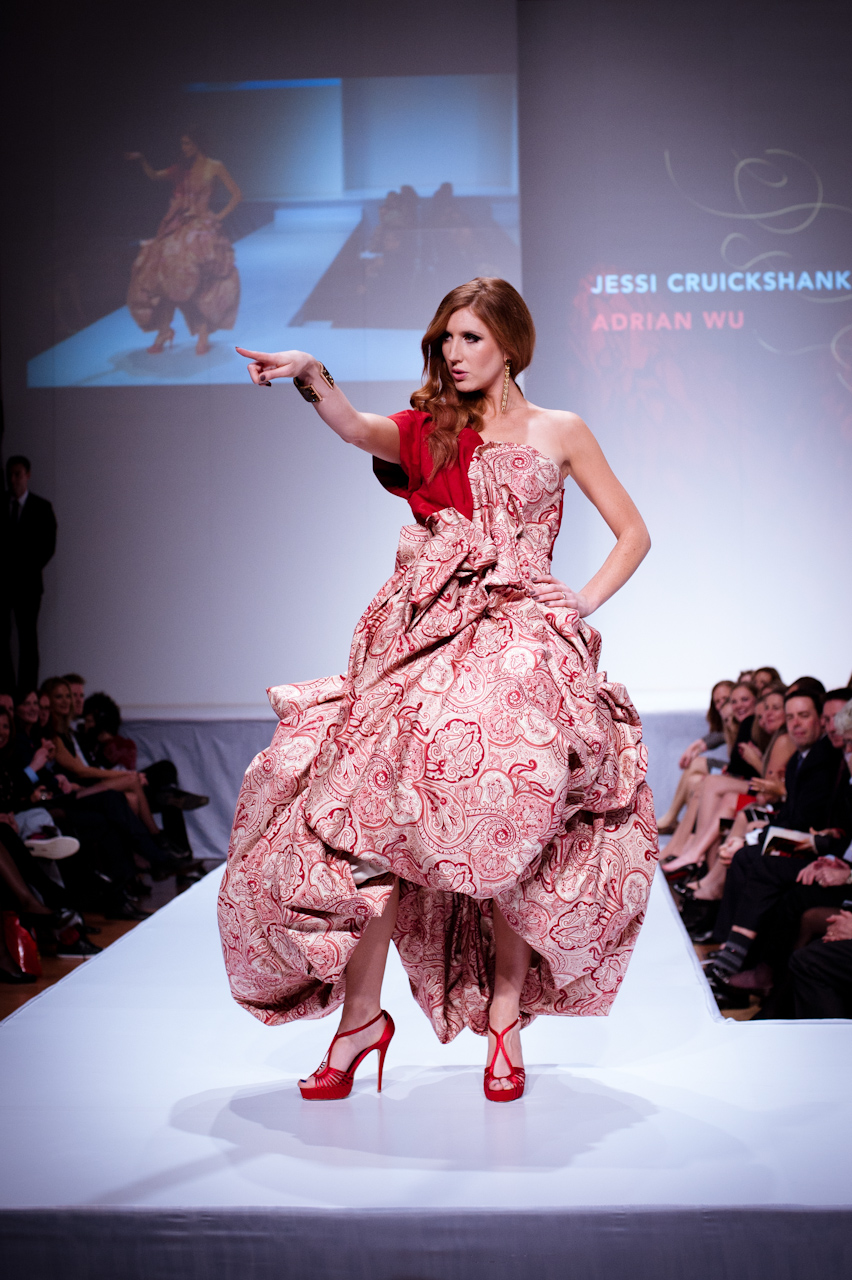
Jessi Cruickshank

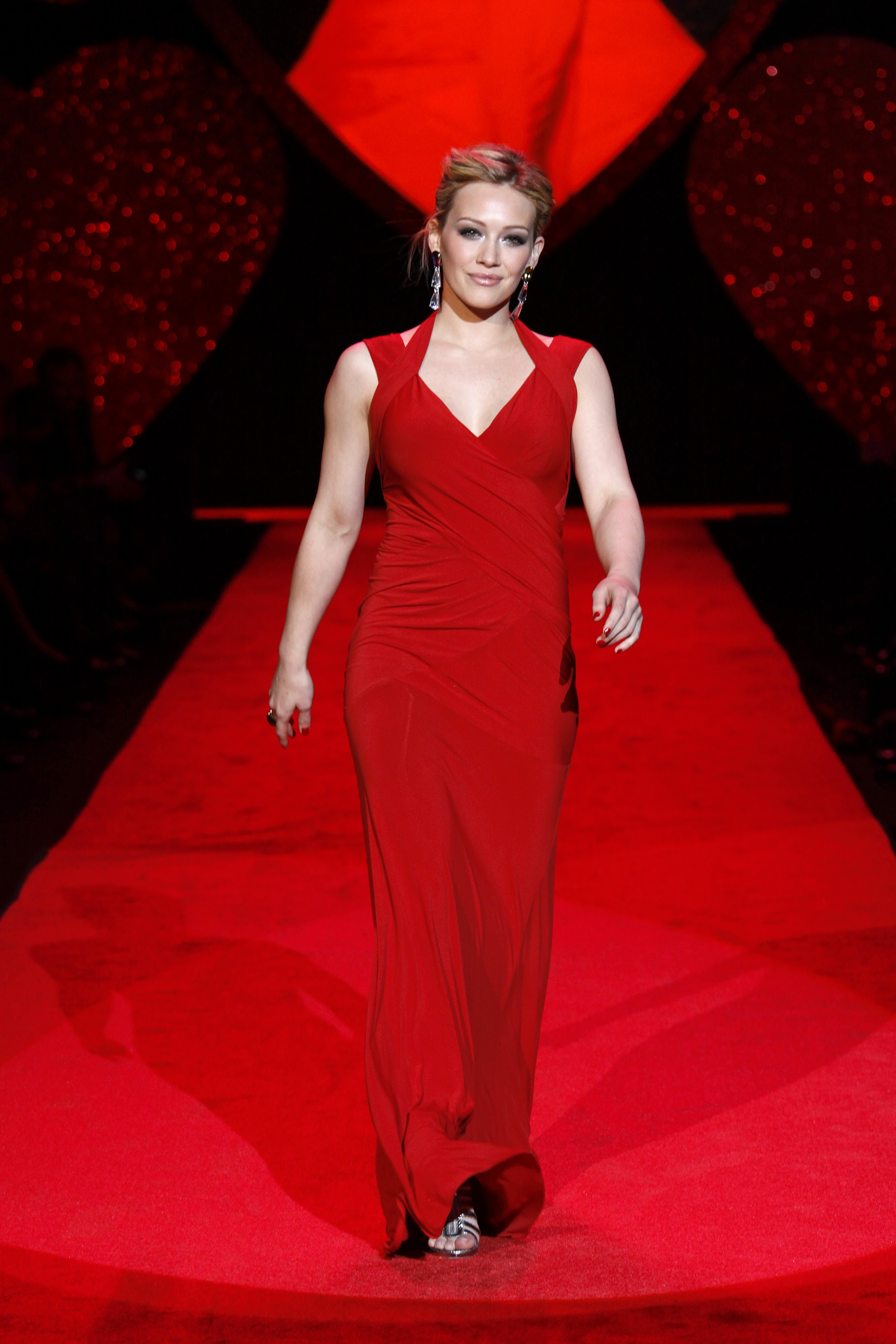
Hilary Duff

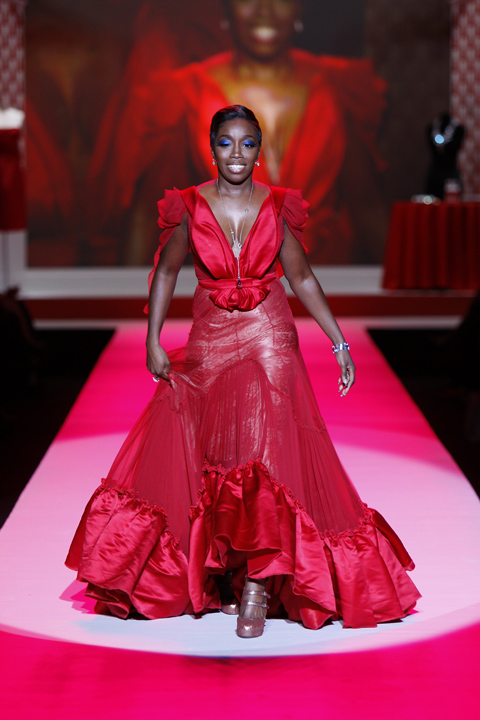
Estelle

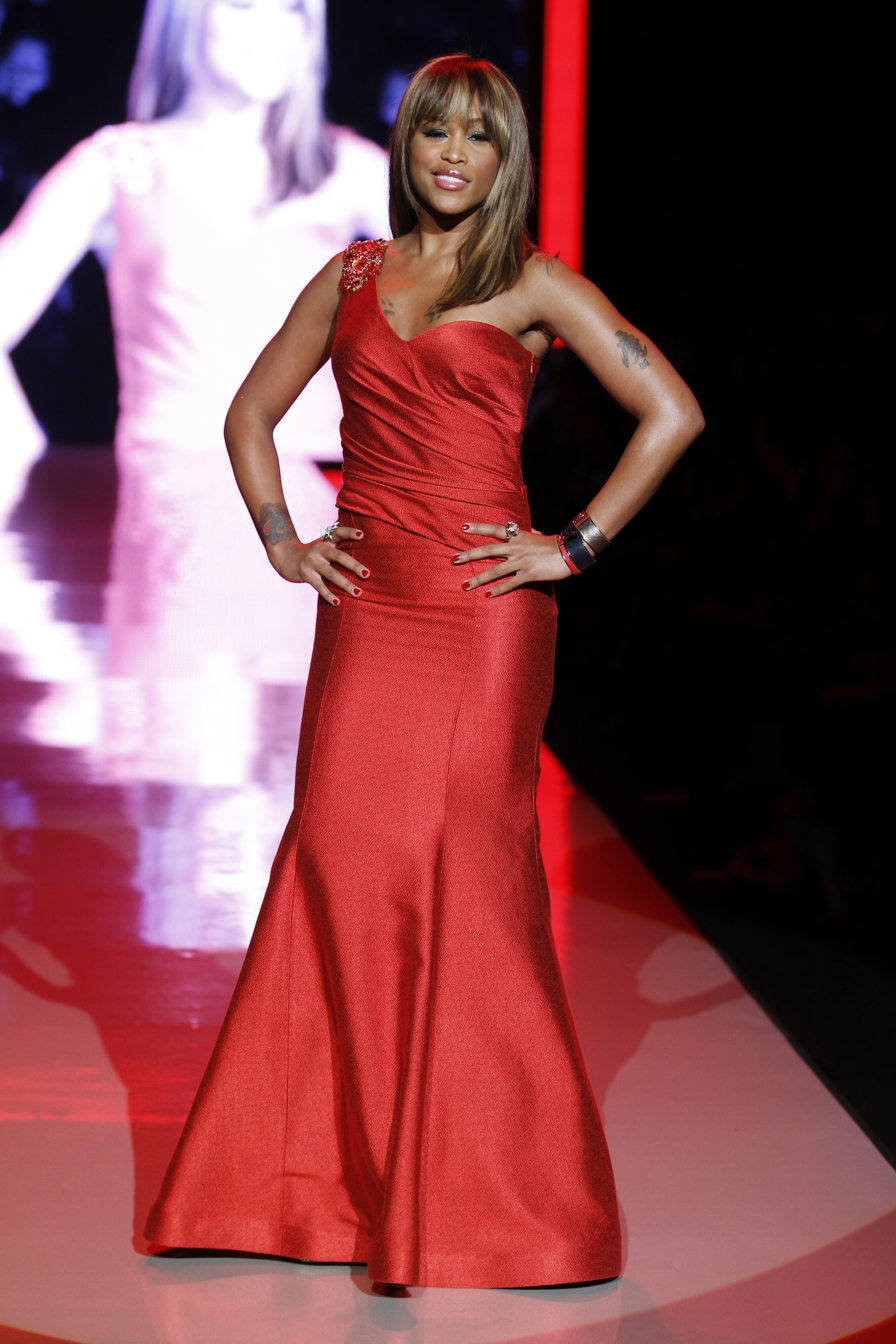
Eve

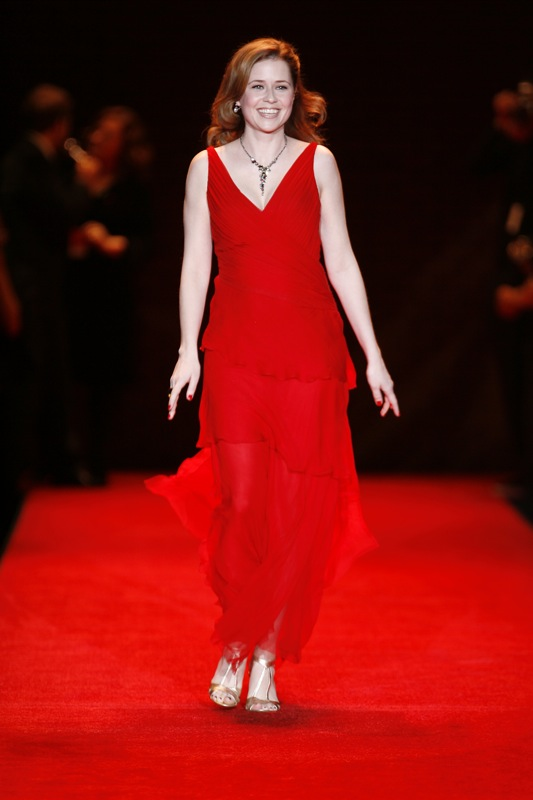
Jenna Fischer

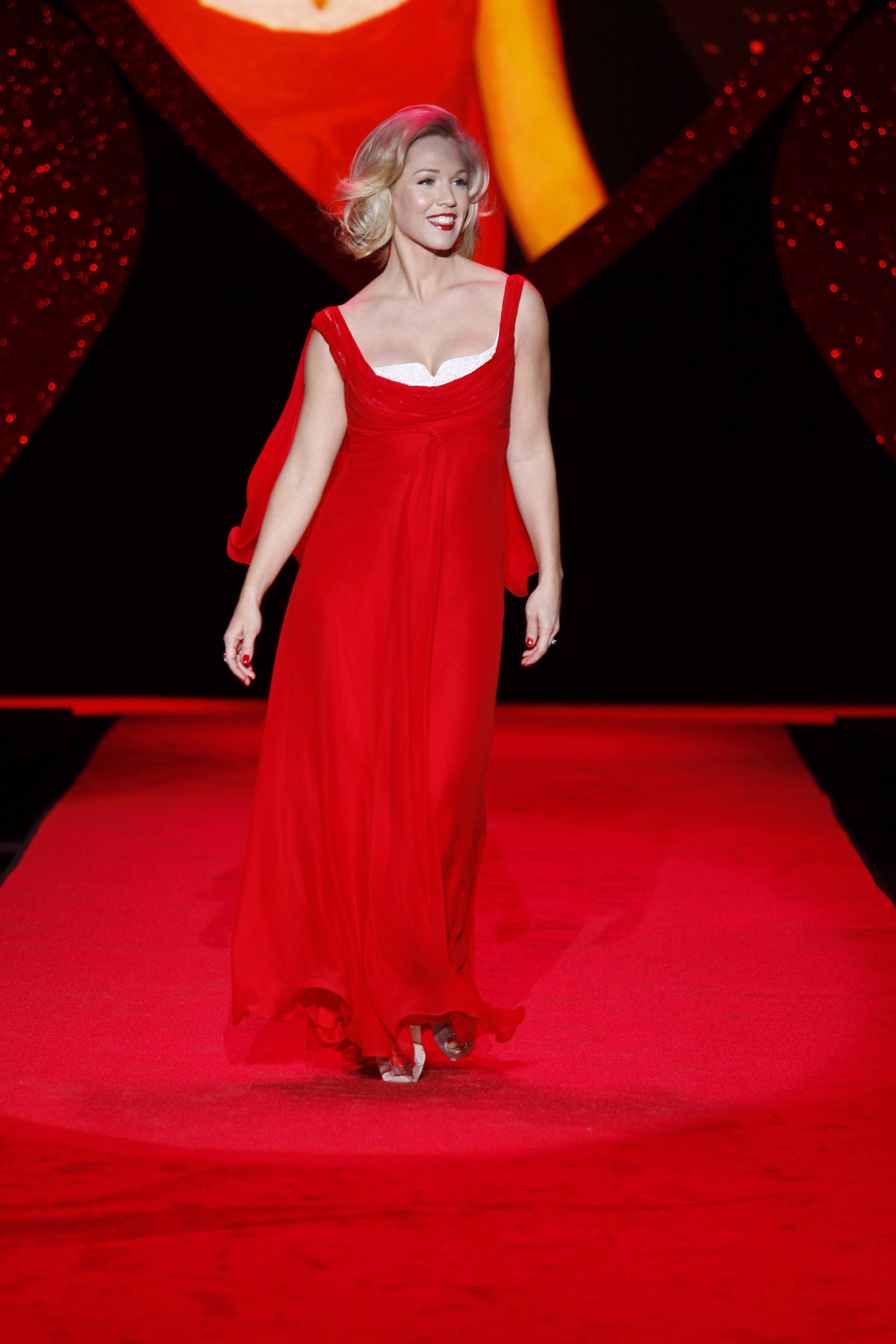
Jennie Garth

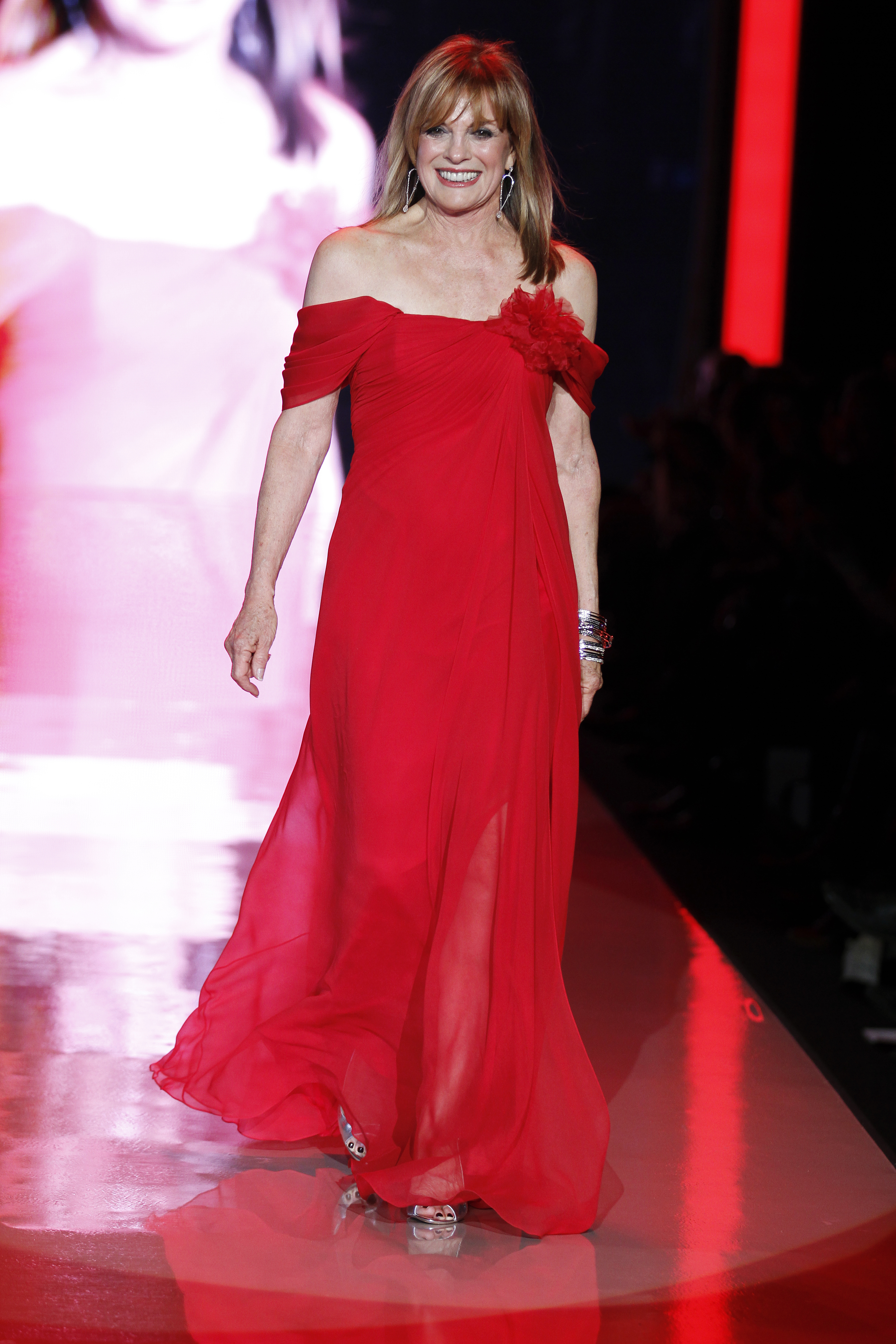
Linda Gray

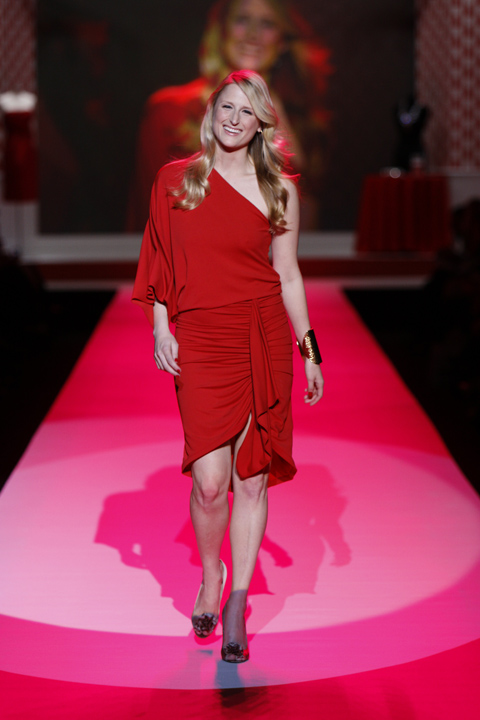
Mamie Gummer

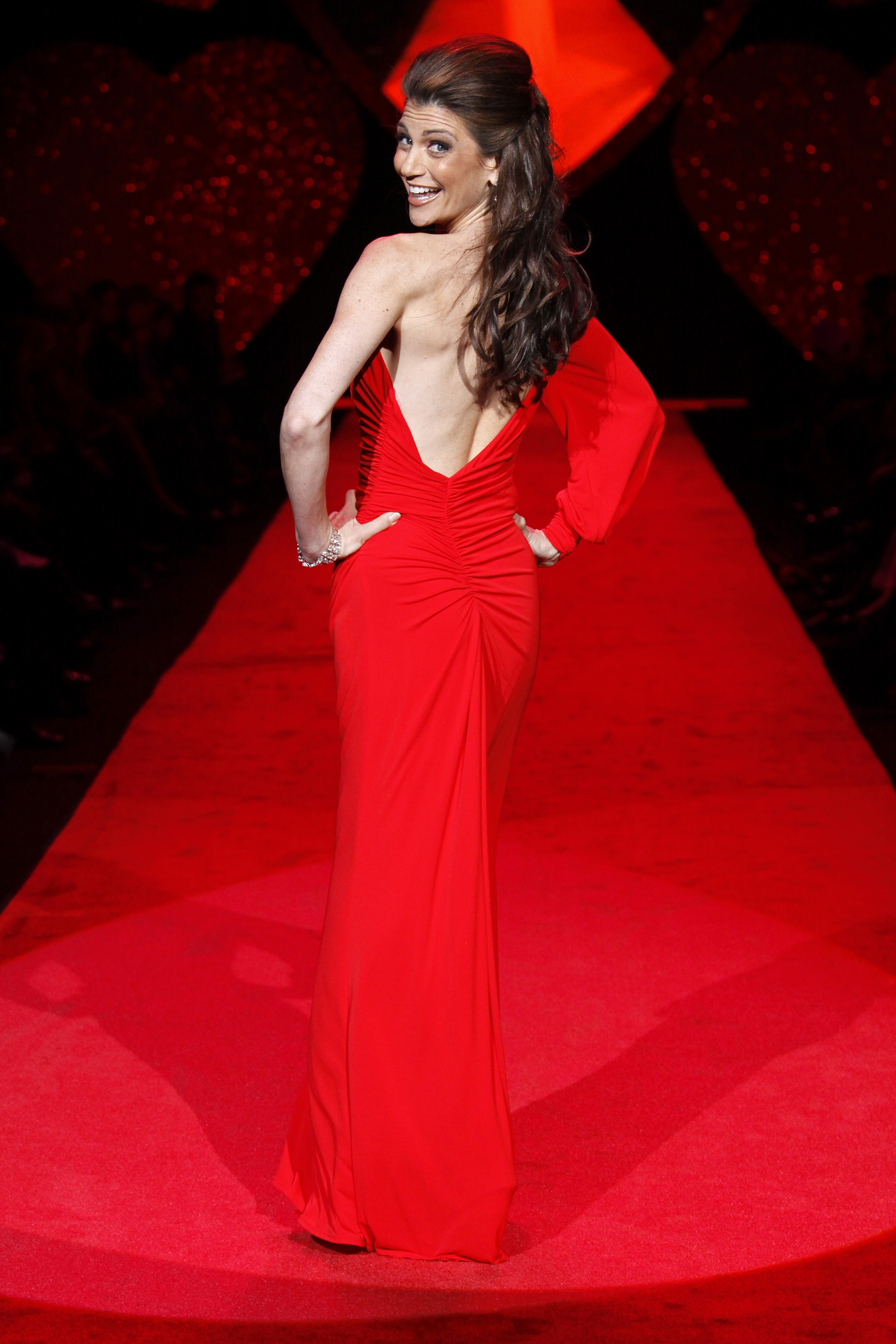
Samantha Harris

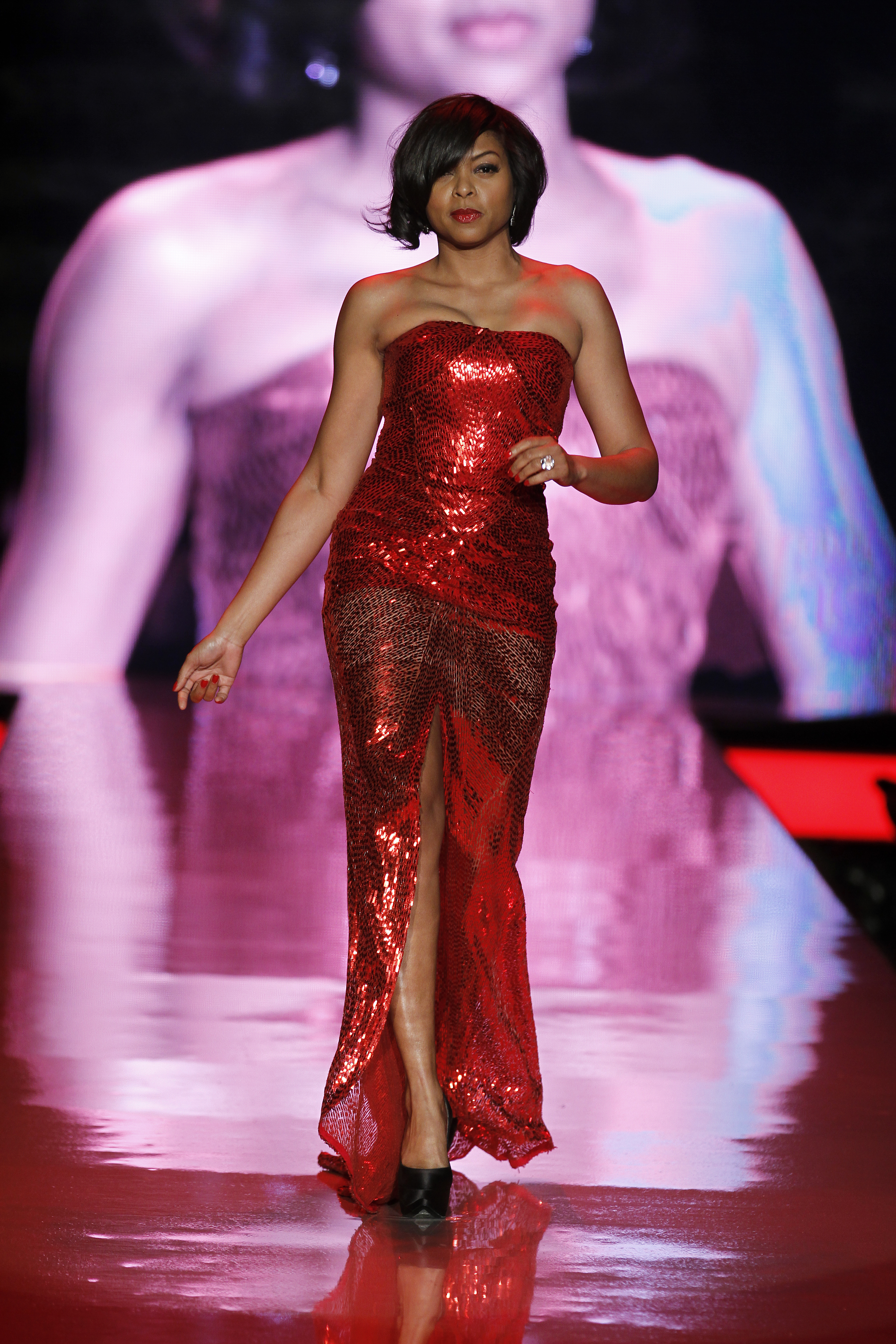
Taraji P. Henson

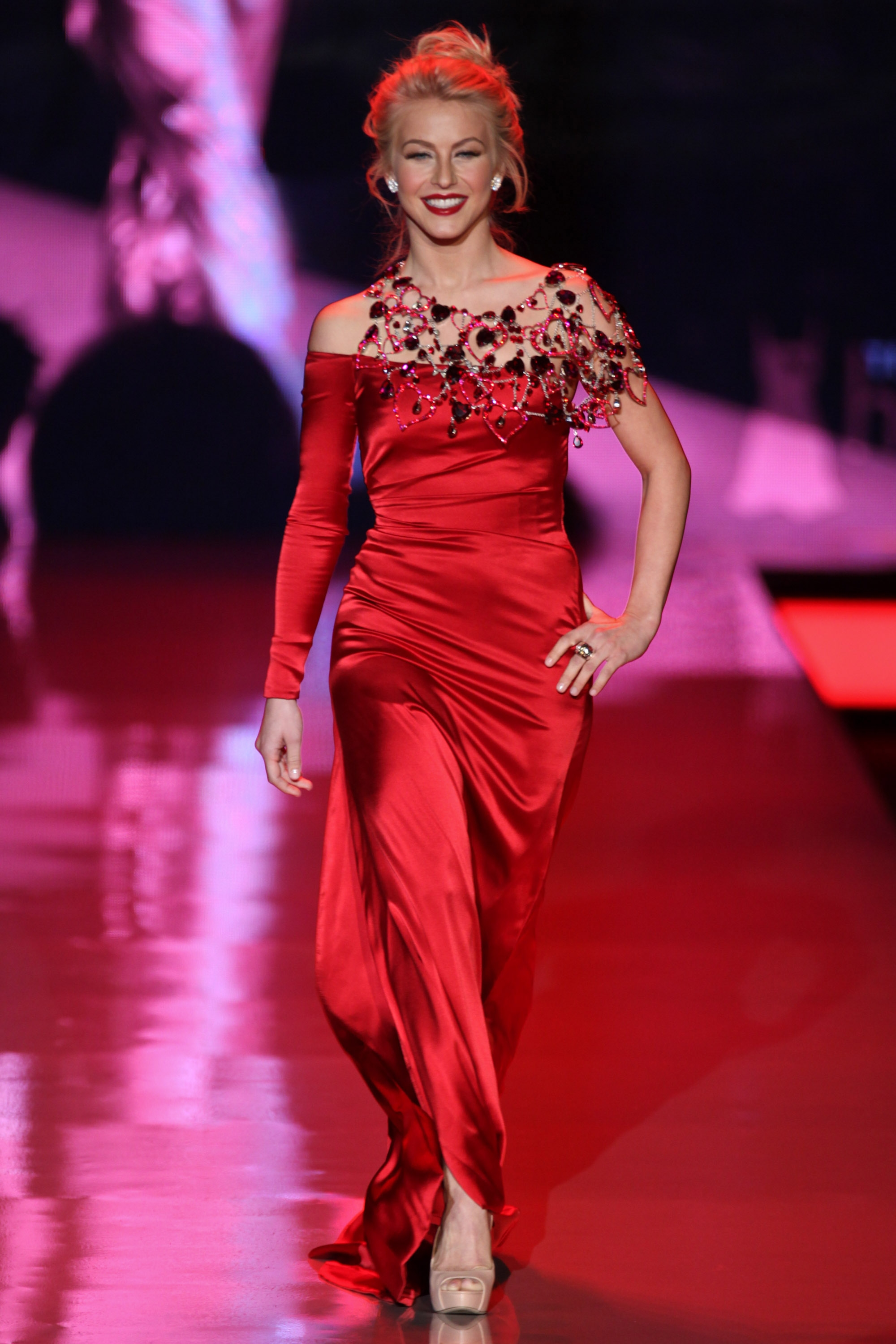
Julianne Hough

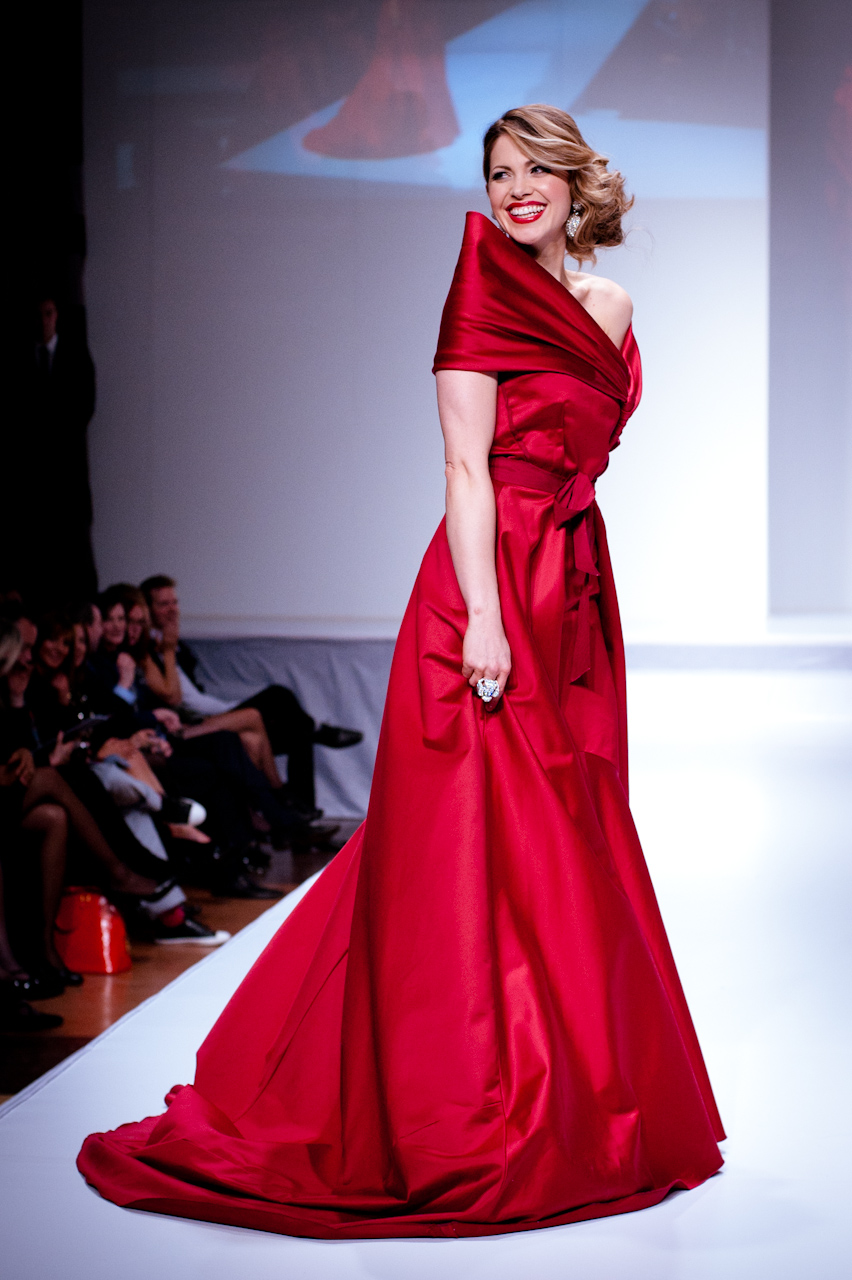
Pascale Hutton

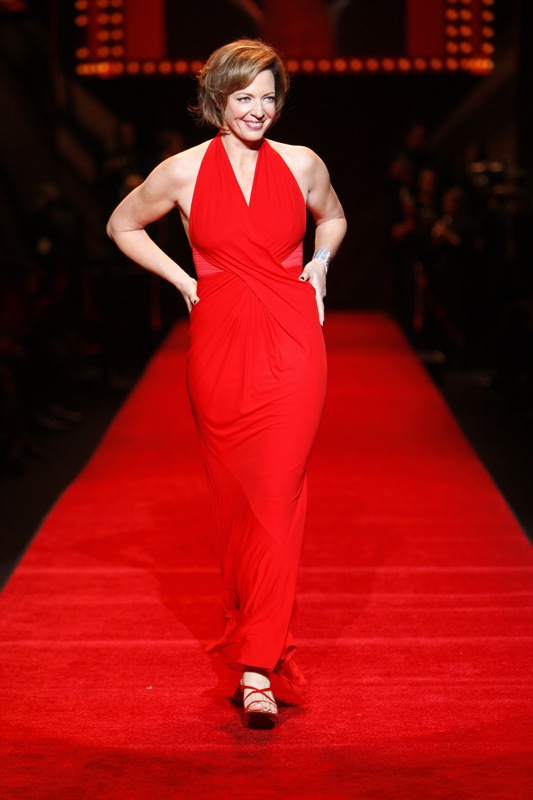
Allison Janney

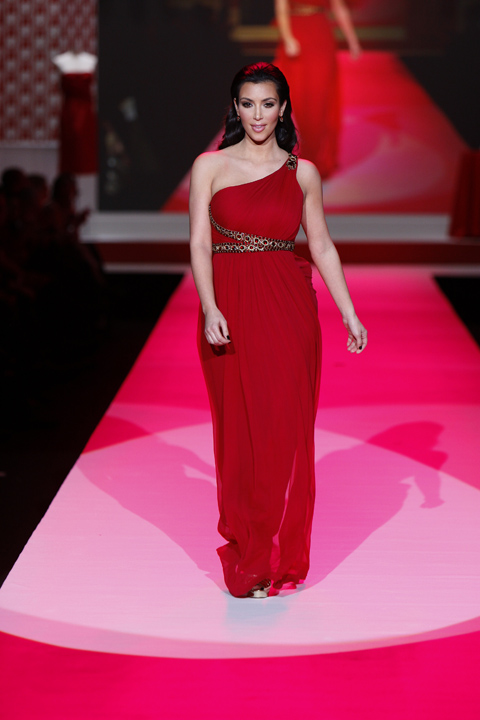
Kim Kardashian

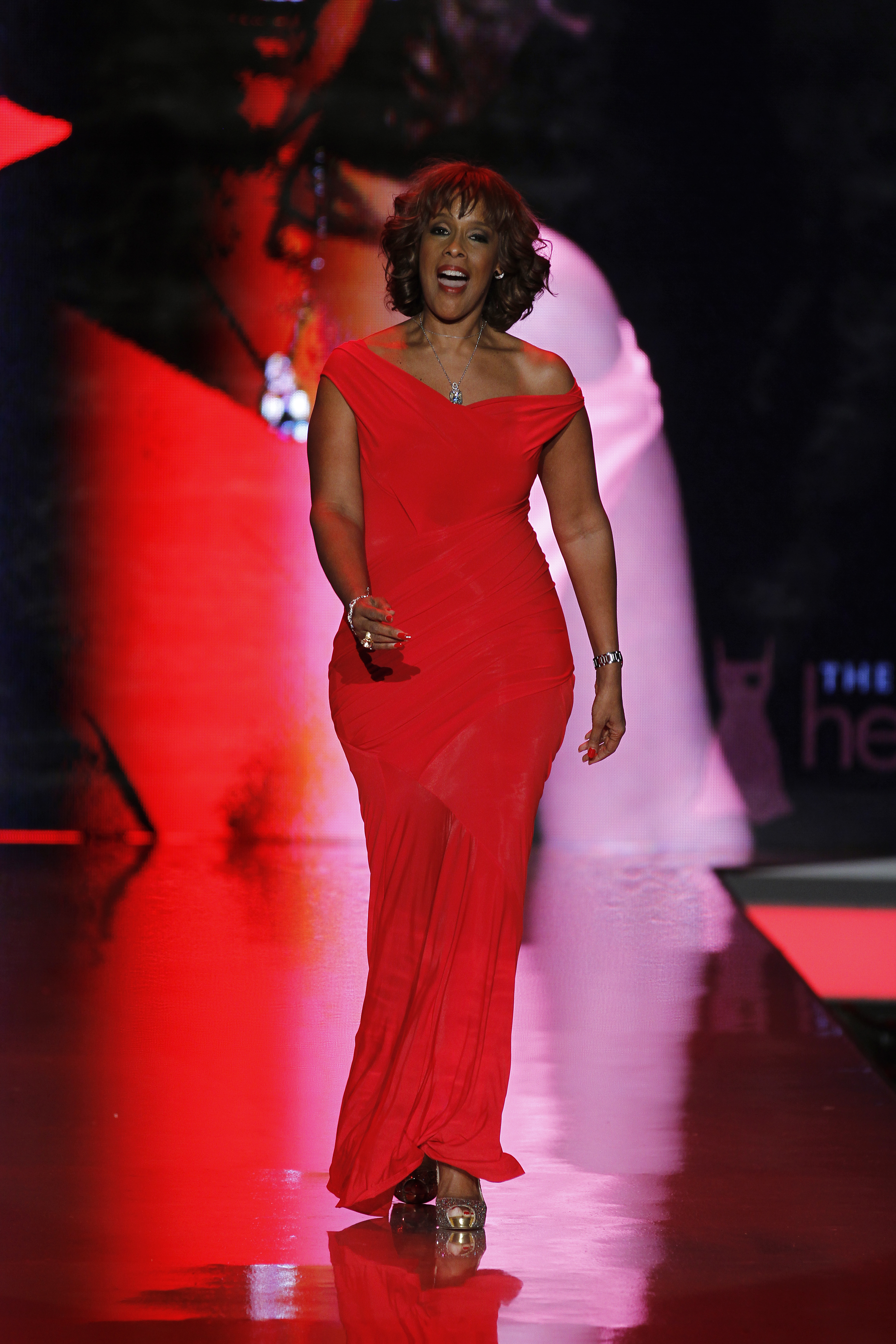
Gayle King

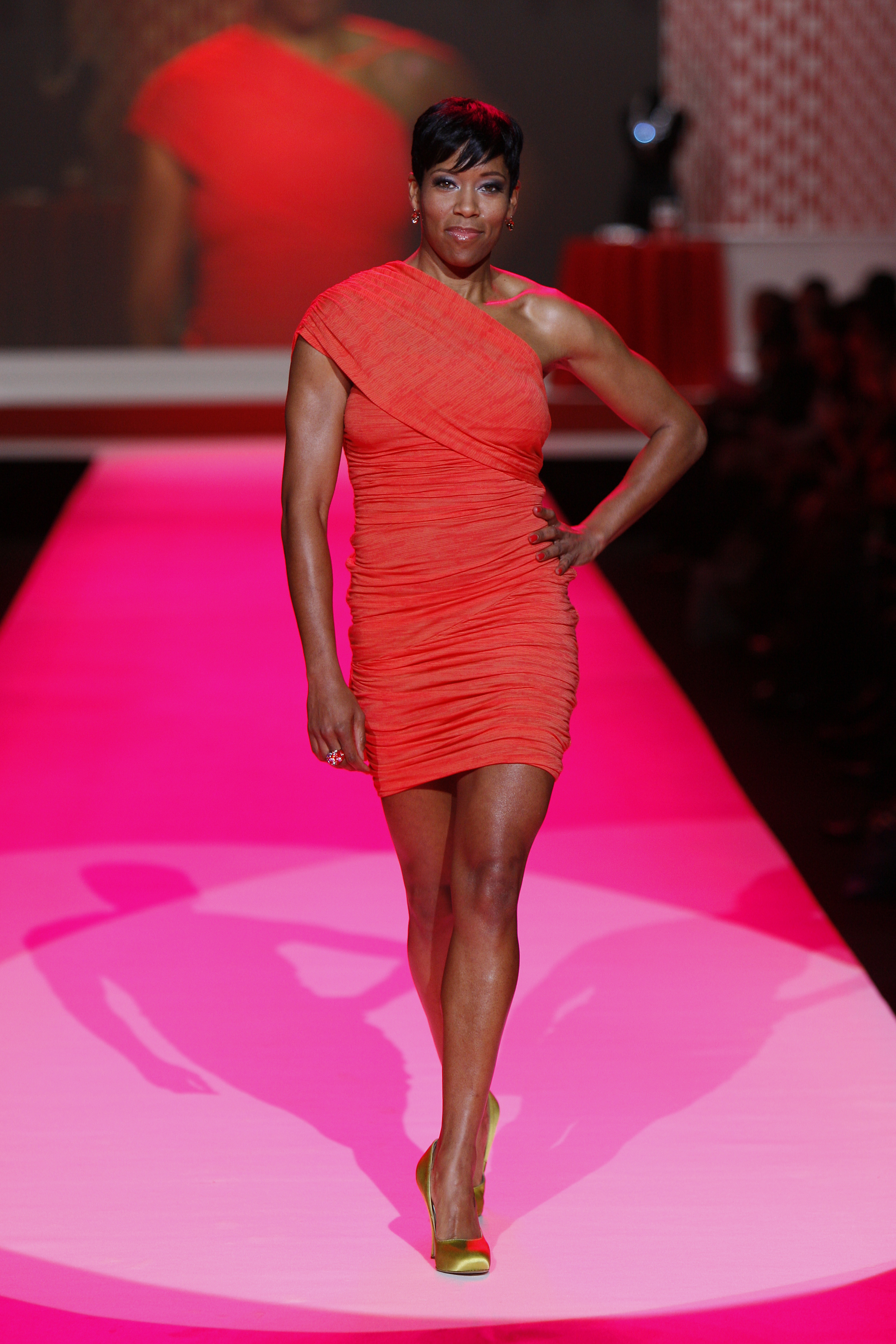
Regina King

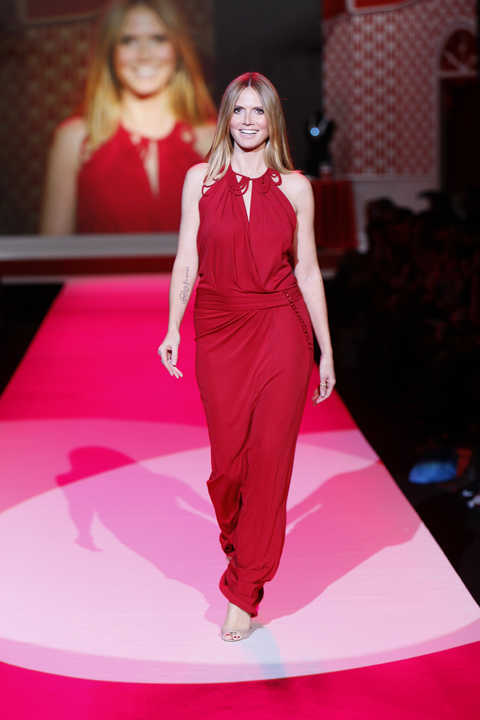
Heidi Klum

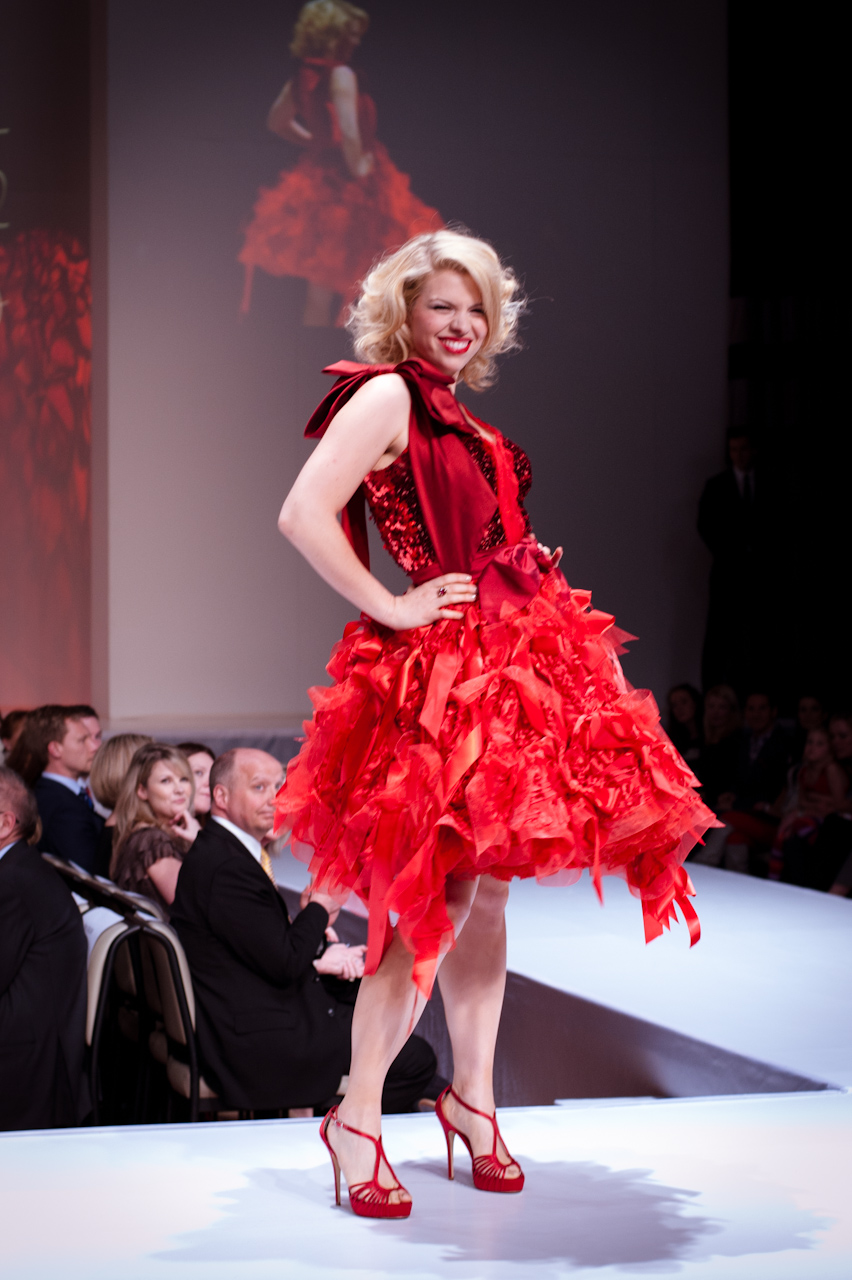
Ali Liebert

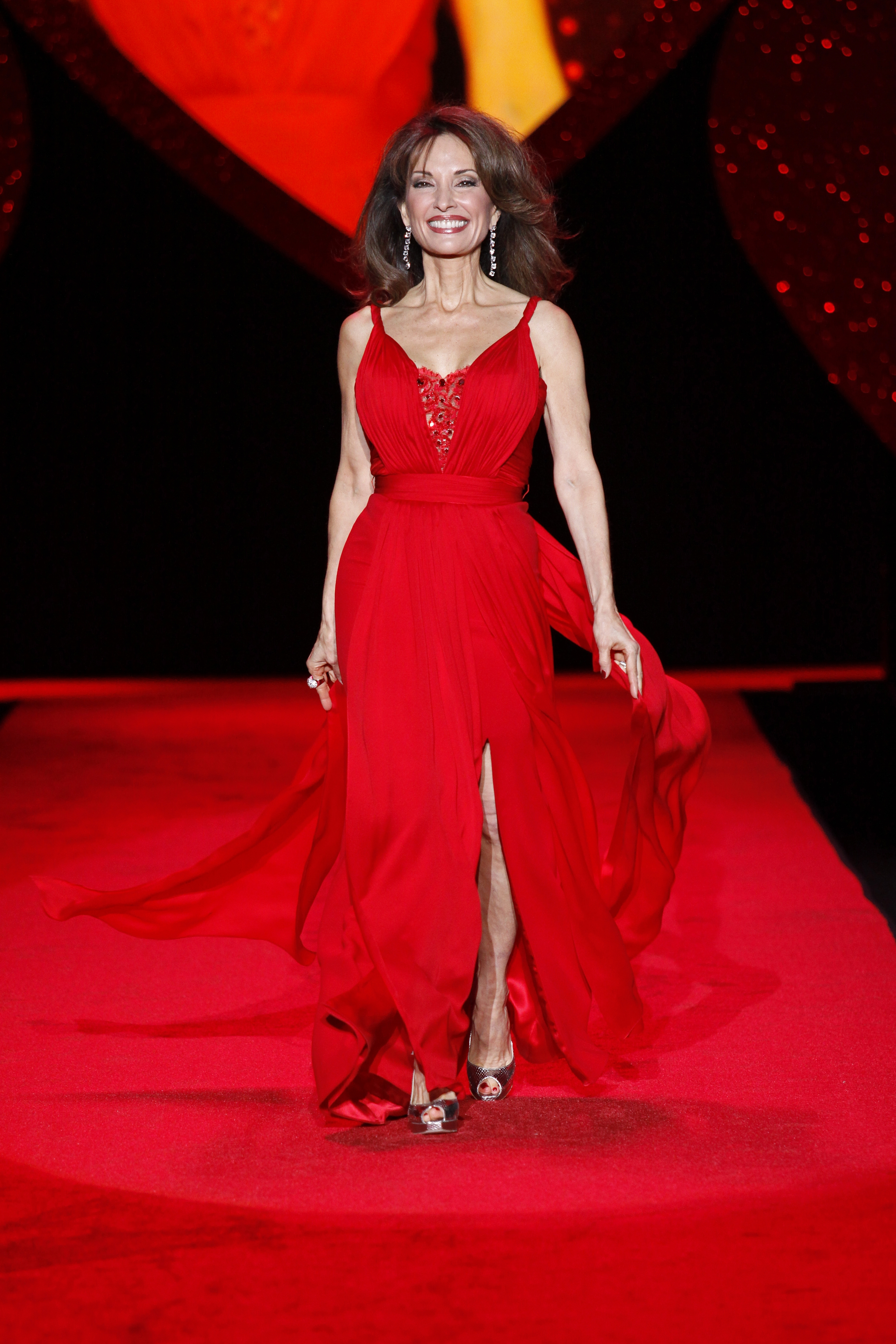
Susan Lucci

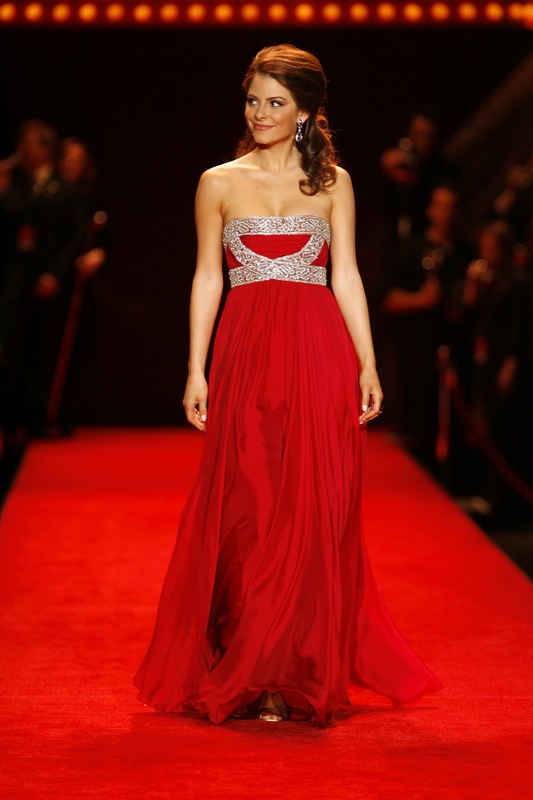
Maria Menounos

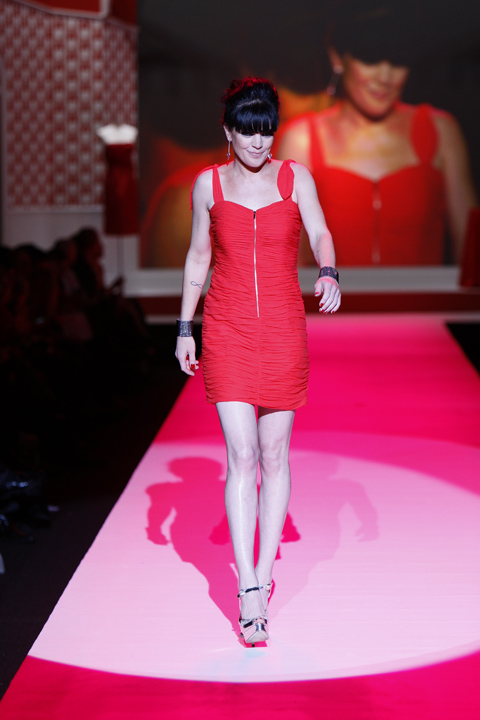
Pauley Perrette

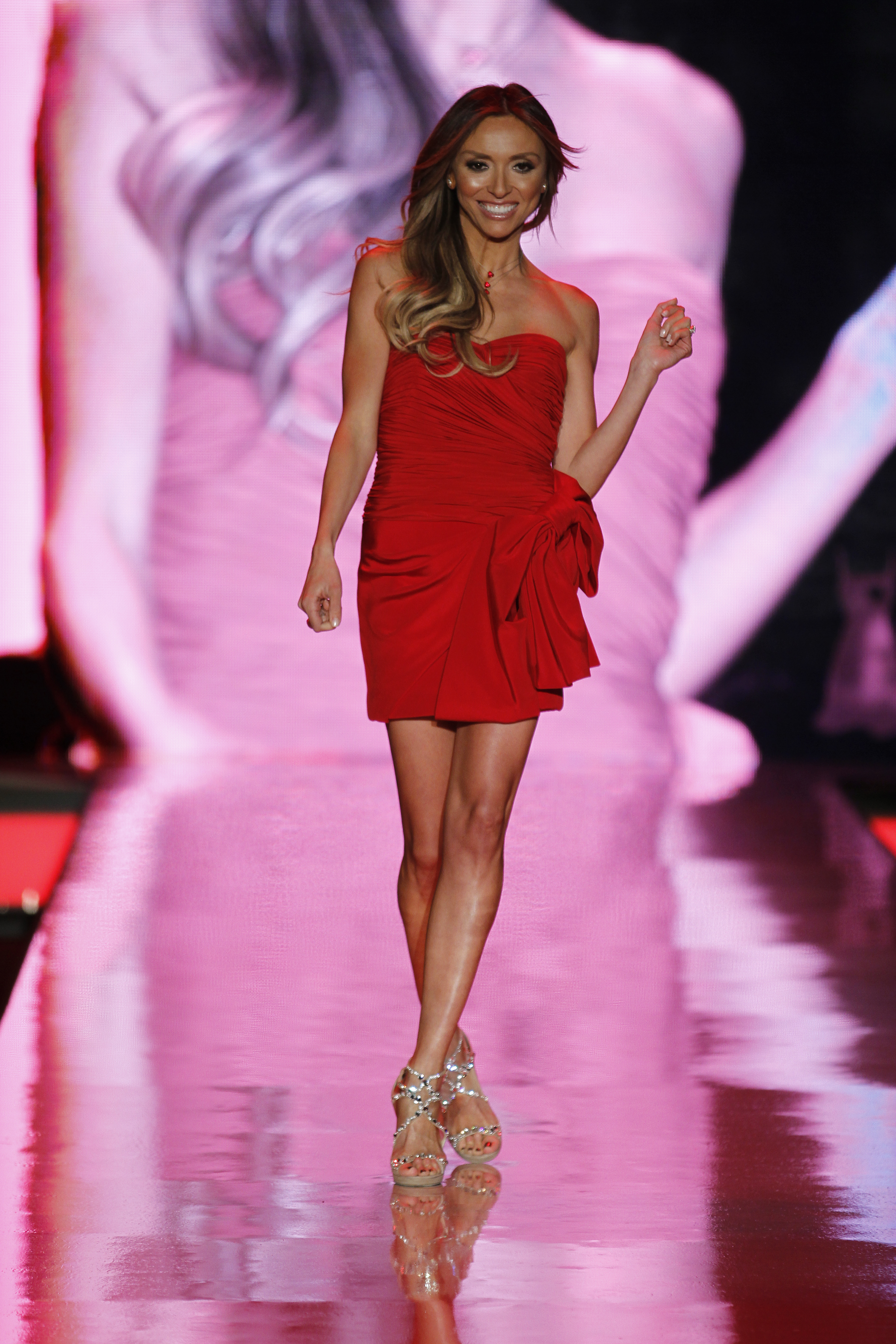
Giuliana Rancic

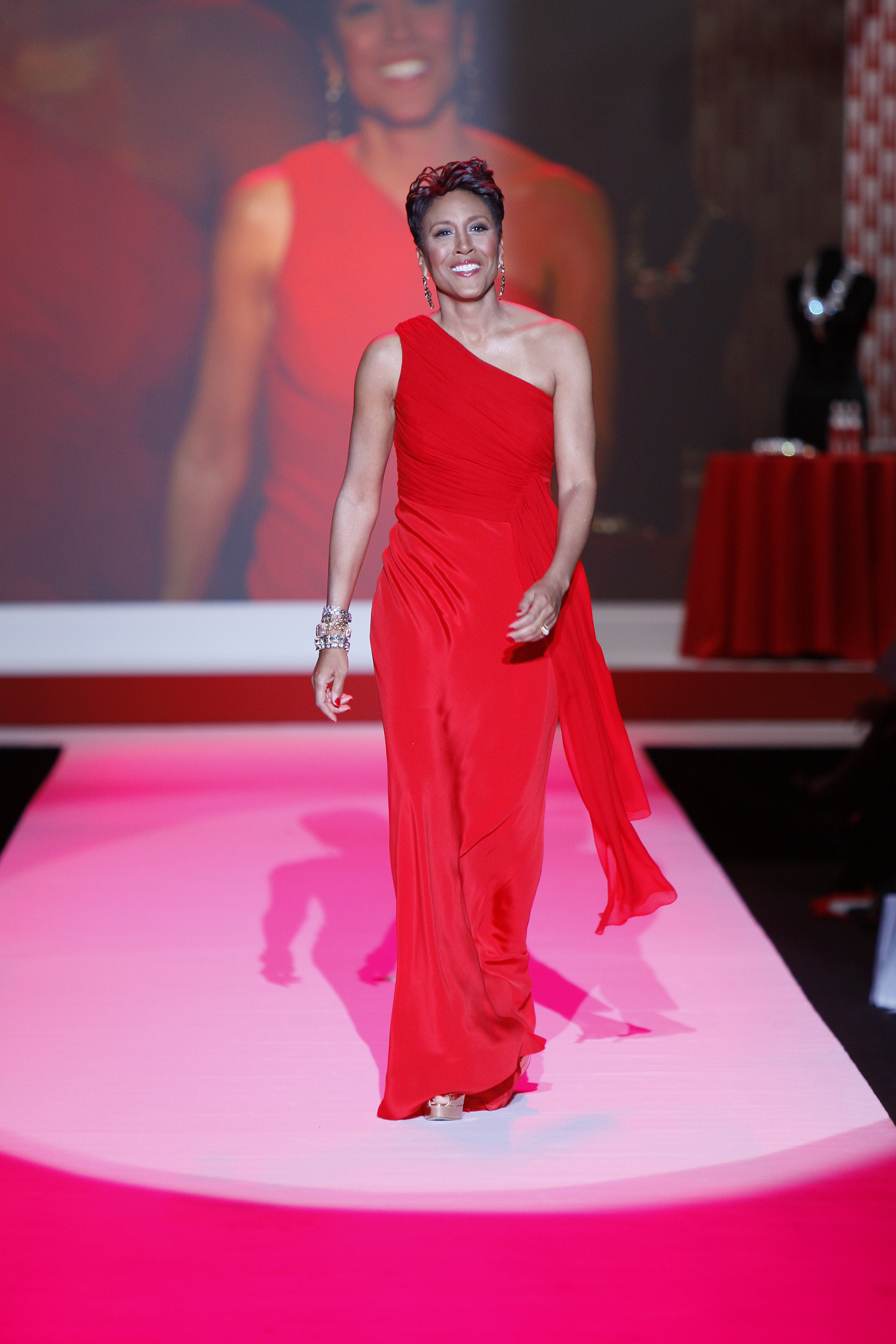
Robin Roberts

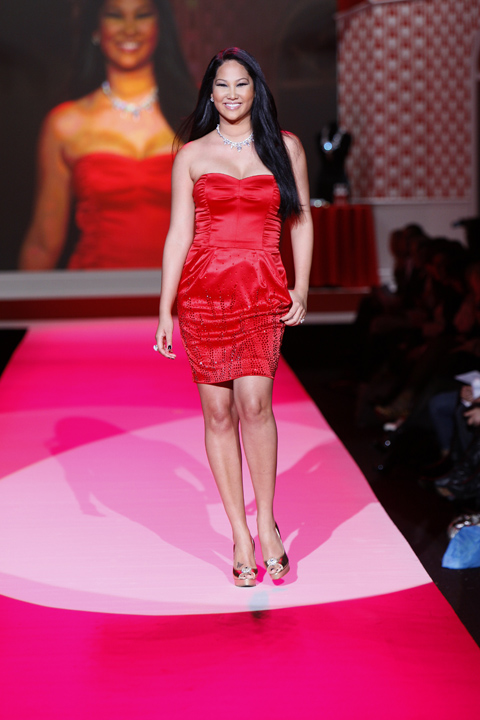
Kimora Lee Simmons

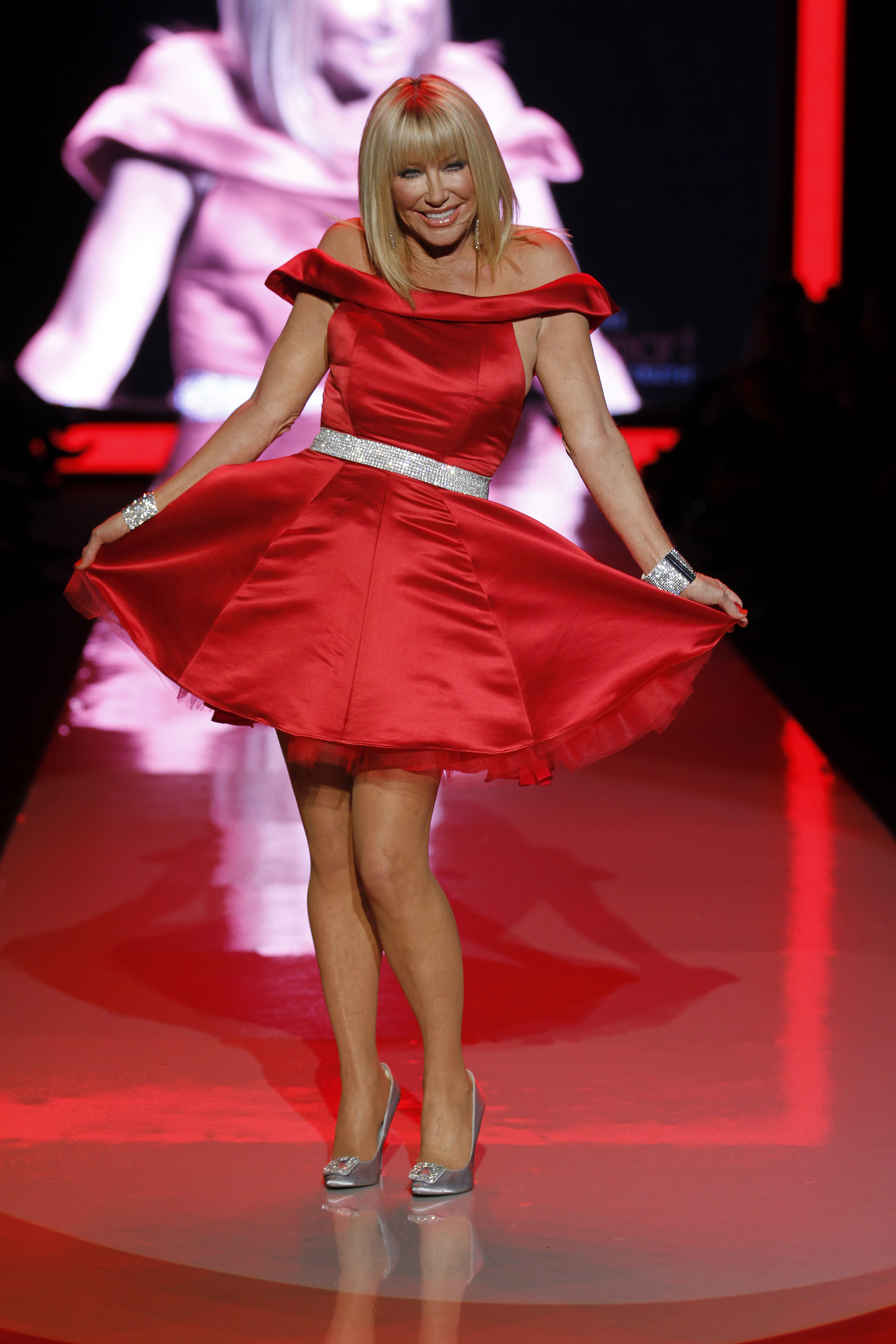
Suzanne Somers

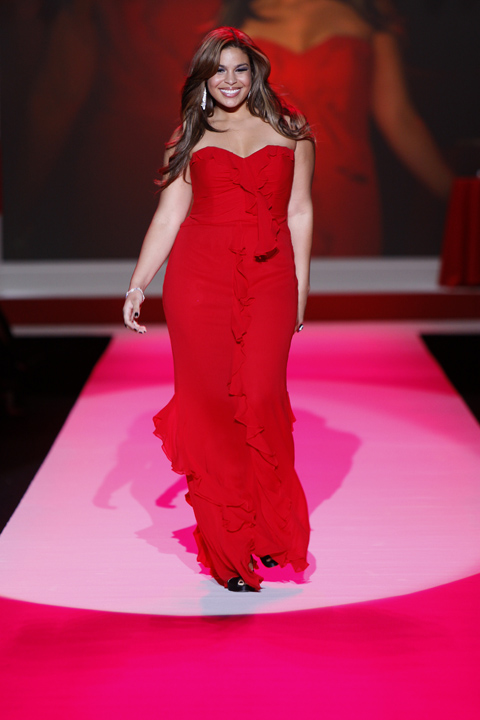
Jordin Sparks

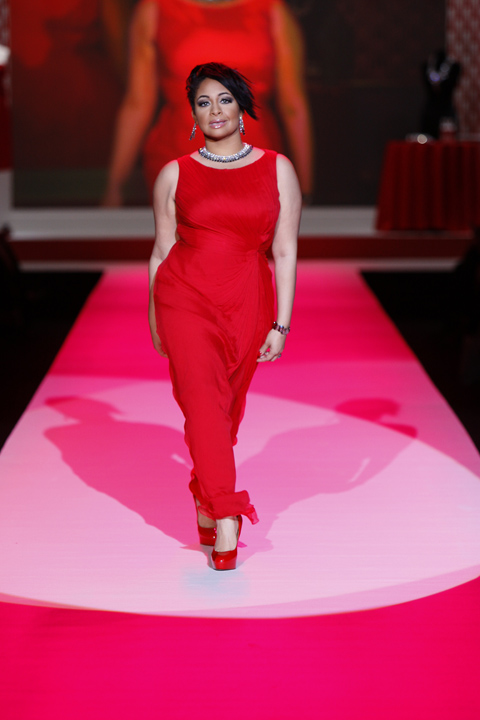
Raven-Symoné

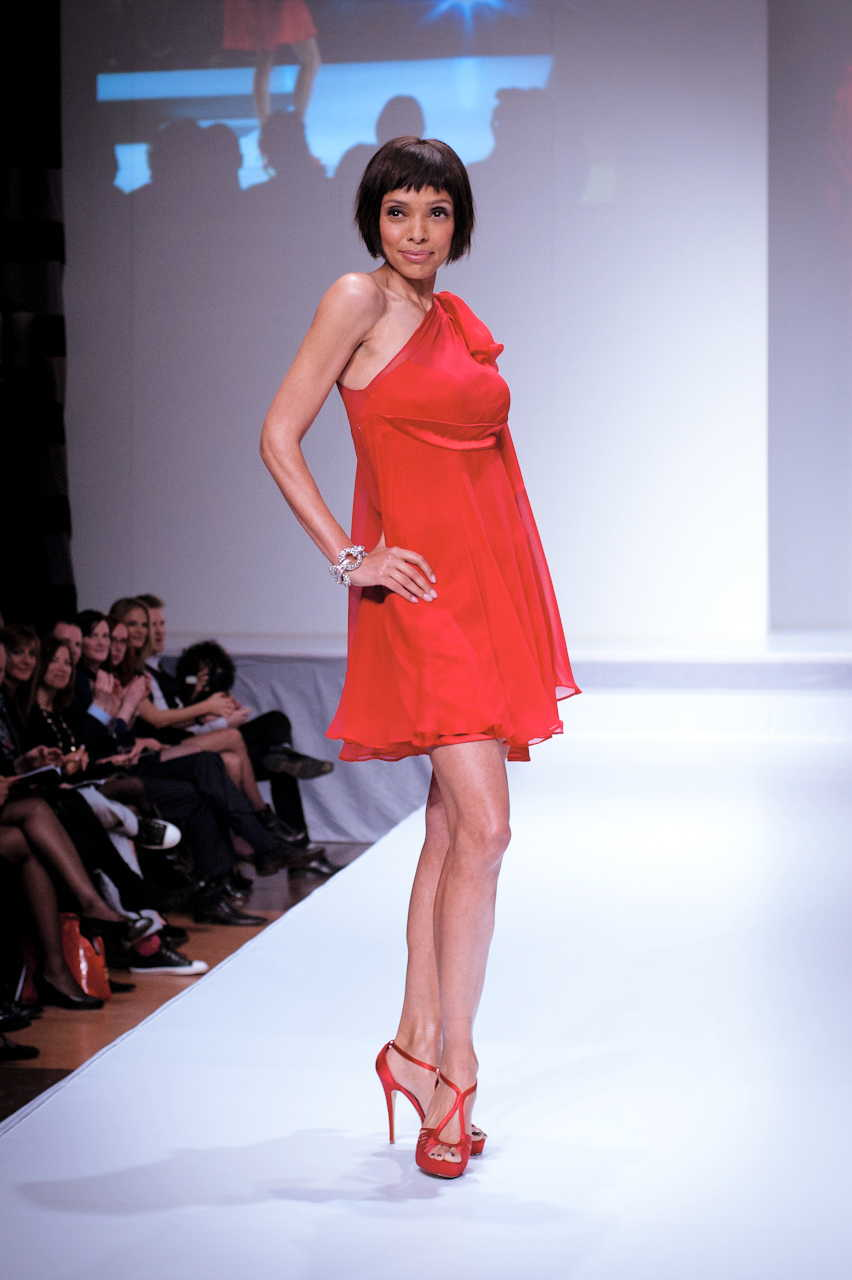
Tamara Taylor

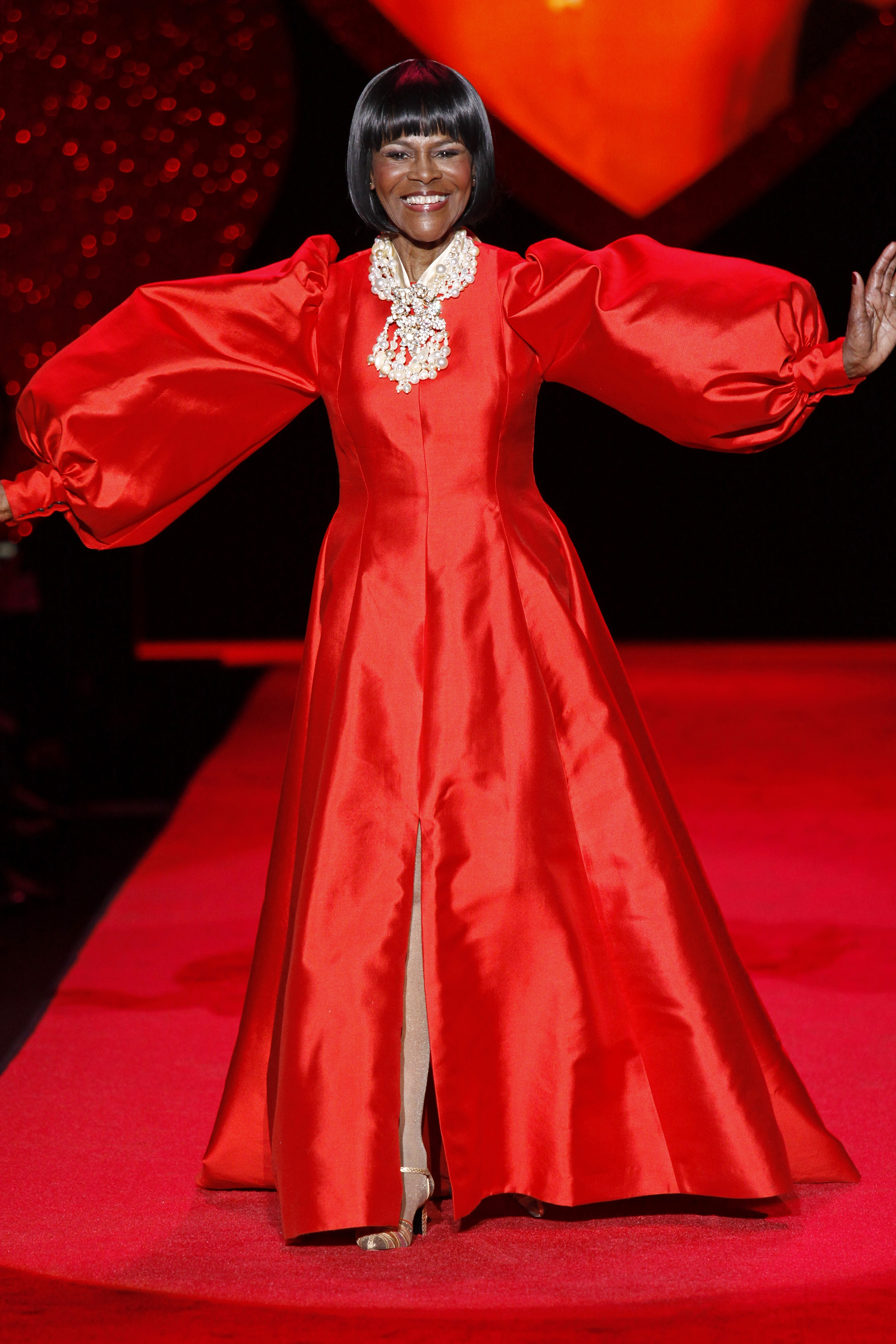
Cicely Tyson

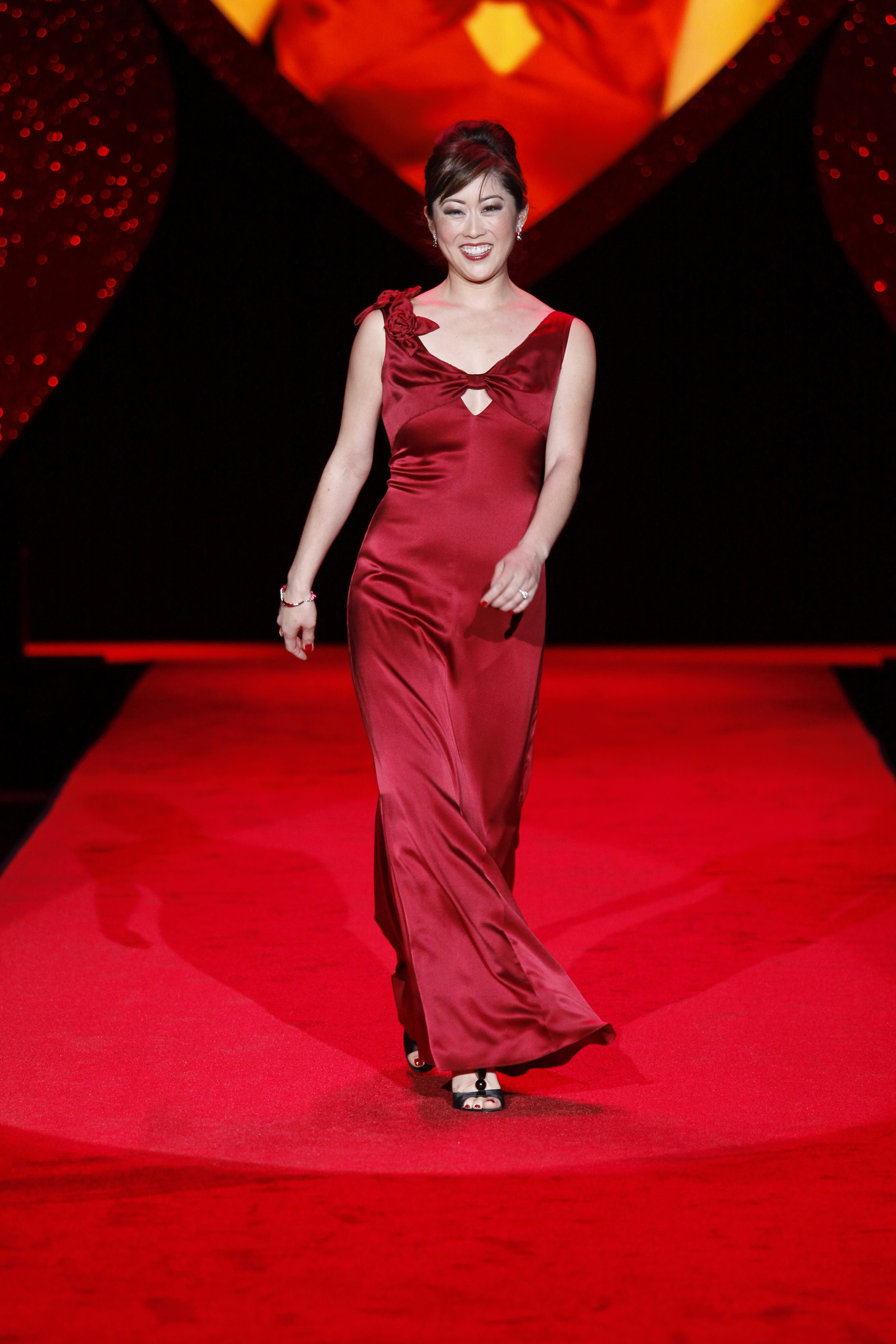
Kristi Yamaguchi
