= Tug of Words =

American television game show (2021–2023)

- Genre: Game show
- Directed by: Hal Grant
- Presented by: Ahmad Rashad; Samantha Harris
- Country of origin: United States
- Original language: English
- No. of seasons: 2
- No. of episodes: 130

Production
- Executive producers: Michael Davies; Susan Warner (2021–22); Bari Jean Dorman (2022–23)
- Running time: 20–22 minutes
- Production companies: Embassy Row; Game Show Enterprises

Original release
- Network: Game Show Network
- Release: November 8, 2021 – February 15, 2023

Tug of Words is an American television game show that aired on Game Show Network from November 8, 2021 to February 15, 2023.

== Gameplay ==
=== Season 1 ===
The game is played over three rounds. The first two rounds are played to earn an advantage in the third round, and the team that wins the third round wins $1,000 and the chance to play the bonus round to increase their winnings to $10,000.

==== Round 1 ====
Four three-letter words are shown to the teams, each word is the starting point for a word chain. One team chooses a starting word, and the host reads a clue to another word (which may be a proper noun or abbreviation); the player must change one letter in the starting word to make the correct word (e.g., CAT to CUT). The next clue is read to the other player, who must in turn change a letter to make a new word. Each correct answer moves an on-screen pennant marker one space towards that team's side of the set, while there is no penalty for an incorrect answer or no answer.

During a team's turn, the players must alternate turns without conferring, and must also wait for the host to read the entire clue before answering. If either rule is violated, the answer is treated as incorrect (even if it is otherwise correct) and the next clue is read.

Once the first team has completed its turn, the other team chooses one of the three remaining starting words and plays its own set of clues. Each team has 40 seconds to solve as many words as possible, and the team that has the marker on its side after both teams have played once wins a pennant-style flag. (If the marker is at the neutral position after both teams have played, then neither team wins the flag). The teams then play another pair of turns with the remaining two words, and the winner of that pair of turns also wins a flag.

==== Round 2 ====
The second round is played in the same manner as the first round, with teams now attempting to solve four-letter words.

==== Round 3 ====
An advantage is assigned to one of the teams based on the number of flags won in the previous rounds at one space per flag (for example, if one team has won three flags while their opponents have won one, then the team with three flags is given a two-space advantage). In this round, two five-letter words are shown to the teams, and the teams play one pair of turns. Unlike in previous rounds, the teams are to change two letters at a time, and the two letters to be changed are highlighted (e.g., VOWEL to TOWER), in addition, the time limit is increased to 45 seconds. After both teams have played, the team with the marker on its side wins $1,000 and plays the bonus round to increase their winnings to $10,000.

If, after both teams have played, the marker is in the neutral position, then a tiebreaker word is played between the players nearest to the host. The players involved in the tiebreaker are shown a new five-letter word, and the two letters to be changed are highlighted. One additional clue is read on the buzzers; the players must wait for the entire clue to be read before buzzing in. If a correct answer is given, that player's team wins the game; however, if an incorrect answer is given, that player's team automatically loses.

==== Bonus Round ====
The team members are shown a two-word phrase (which can include proper nouns and names), and with each clue, they must change one of the two words (e.g., "plastic surgery" to "plastic bag"). The flag starts at the neutral position and, as before, a correct answer moves the flag one space forward on a 10-space track. Unlike previous rounds, an incorrect answer (or rule violation) moves the flag one space backward unless it is already on the neutral position. If the team successfully advances the flag to the end of the track within 60 seconds, their winnings are increased to $10,000.

=== Season 2 ===
The basic rules remain the same, with the following changes:

- Round 1 begins with two chains of three-letter words, played for one flag, followed by four chains of four-letter words, for two more flags. The time per chain has been reduced to 30 seconds.
- Round 2 contains four chains of five-letter words, played for two flags, each for 40 seconds.
- Round 3 now has two chains of six-letter words, each for 45 seconds. As with the five-letter words, contestants must replace two specified letters in each new word.

== Production ==
The series was announced in July 2021, with Ahmad Rashad as host. The show premiered on November 8, 2021.

In August 2022, the series was renewed for a second season, which premiered on November 14, 2022, with Samantha Harris replacing Rashad as host.

== See also ==
- Chain Letters
