= 1970 All-Pacific-8 Conference football team =

The 1970 All-Pacific-8 Conference football team consists of American football players chosen by various organizations for All-Pacific-8 Conference teams for the 1970 NCAA University Division football season.

== Offensive selections ==
=== Quarterbacks ===
- Jim Plunkett, Stanford (AP-1; UPI-1) (1970 Heisman Trophy winner)
- Dennis Dummit, UCLA (UPI-2)

=== Running backs ===
- Bobby Moore, (later Ahmad Rashad), Oregon (AP-1; UPI-1)
- Randy Vataha, Stanford (AP-1; UPI-1)
- Clarence Davis, USC (AP-1; UPI-2)
- Dave Schilling, Oregon State (UPI-1)
- Bob Ewen, Washington State (UPI-2)
- Bo Cornell, Washington (UPI-2)

=== Ends/receivers ===
- Bob Moore, Stanford (AP-1 [tight end]; UPI-1 [end])
- Bob Newland, Oregon (AP-1 [end]; UPI-1 [end])
- Jim Krieg, Washington (UPI-2)
- Bob Chandler, USC (UPI-2)

=== Tackles ===
- Steve Jubb, Stanford (AP-1; UPI-1)
- Bob Richards, California (AP-1; UPI-1)
- Marv Montgomery, USC (UPI-2)
- Tom Shellabarger, San Diego State (UPI-2)

=== Guards ===
- Steve Busch, Washington State (AP-1; UPI-1)
- Ernie Janet, Washington (AP-1; UPI-1)
- Jack Stambaugh, Oregon (UPI-2)
- Greg Hendren, California (UPI-2)

=== Centers ===
- Dave Dalby, UCLA (AP-1)
- John Sande, Stanford (UPI-1)
- Bruce Jarvis, Washington (UPI-2)

== Defensive selections ==
=== Ends ===
- Charlie Weaver, USC (AP-1; UPI-1)
- Jim Sherbert, Oregon State (AP-1; UPI-1)
- Steve Buettner, Oregon (UPI-2)
- Pete Lazetich, Stanford (UPI-2)

=== Tackles ===
- Craig Hanneman, Oregon State (AP-1 [lineman]; UPI-1)
- Dave Tipton, Stanford (AP-1 [lineman]; UPI-1 [linebacker])
- Tom Falla, Washington (AP-1 [lineman]; UPI-2)
- Tim Osterling, UCLA (UPI-1)
- D. Z. White, California (UPI-2)

=== Linebackers ===
- Sherman White, California (AP-1 [lineman]; UPI-1)
- Jeff Siemon, Stanford (AP-1; UPI-2)
- Tom Graham, Oregon (AP-1; UPI-2)
- Dave Chaney, San Jose State (UPI-1)
- Phil Croyle, California (AP-1)
- Bob Pifferini, USC (UPI-2)

=== Defensive backs ===
- Cal Jones, Washington (AP-1; UPI-1)
- Ray Youngblood, California (AP-1; UPI-1)
- Lionel Coleman, Oregon (AP-1; UPI-2)
- Jack Schultz, Stanford (UPI-2)
- Jim Lilly, Oregon State (UPI-1)
- Bill Cahill, Washington (UPI-2)
- Ron Carver, UCLA (UPI-2)

== Key ==
AP = Associated Press, selected by the conference head coaches

UPI = United Press International, selected by UPI from all teams on the Pacific Coast, not limited to the Pac-8 Conference

== See also ==
- 1970 College Football All-America Team
