= 1971 Rose Bowl =

American college football game

- 57th Rose Bowl Game
Stanford Indians	Ohio State Buckeyes
(8–3)	(9–0)
Pac-8	Big Ten
27	17
Head coach: John Ralston	Head coach: Woody Hayes
AP / Coaches; 12 / 10	AP / Coaches; 2 / 2
	1	2	3	4	Total
Stanford	10	0	3	14	27
Ohio State	7	7	3	0	17
- Date: January 1, 1971
- Season: 1970
- Stadium: Rose Bowl
- Location: Pasadena, California
- MVP: Jim Plunkett (QB, Stanford)
- Favorite: Ohio State by 10 points
- Referee: John Presley (Pacific-8) (split crew: Pac-8, Big Ten)
- Attendance: 103,839

United States TV coverage
- Network: NBC
- Announcers: Curt Gowdy, Kyle Rote
- Nielsen ratings: 27.2

The 1971 Rose Bowl was It was the 57th edition of the college football bowl game, played at the Rose Bowl in Pasadena, California, on Friday, January 1. The Stanford Indians of the Pacific-8 Conference defeated the second-ranked Ohio State Buckeyes of the Big Ten Conference, 27–17. The Player of the Game was Stanford quarterback Jim Plunkett, the Heisman Trophy winner.

== Teams ==
=== Ohio State ===
Ohio State started the season ranked first in the nation and proceeded to roll off five easy wins by a combined score of 195–60. In their fifth game, the Buckeyes won 48–29 at Illinois. But for some reason, Texas leapfrogged Ohio State to #1 after beating unranked Rice 45–21. The next week the Buckeyes defeated #20 Northwestern 24–10, but dropped to third in the rankings as Notre Dame moved up to second after a rout of Navy.

After a 10–7 win with a late field goal at Purdue on November 14, they fell to fifth despite still being undefeated, as Nebraska and Michigan passed them. They earned the Rose Bowl berth on the strength of their 20–9 victory over #4 Michigan in their rivalry game that decided the Big Ten title and rose back to second, behind Texas. After Texas lost in the Cotton Bowl to #6 Notre Dame earlier on New Year's Day, Ohio State went into the Rose Bowl with the inside track to claim the national championship.

=== Stanford ===
Stanford started the season ranked tenth, and in the season opener they upset #4 Arkansas 34–28 at Little Rock. After an easy win over San Jose State, they traveled north to Eugene for a game that featured a quarterback battle between Plunkett and Oregon sophomore Dan Fouts. Stanford won 33–10, but then were caught looking ahead to their showdown with USC and lost 24–16 at home to Purdue. They then beat four-time defending Pac-8 champion USC at Stanford, 24–14 (avenging a last second loss to the Trojans the year before). An easy 63–16 win over conference doormat Washington State boosted the Indians to #8.

Next up was a showdown with #16 UCLA in Los Angeles for the conference lead. In what was expected to be another quarterback showdown between Plunkett and the Bruins' Dennis Dummit, the defenses dominated in Stanford's key 9–7 win. After an easy win over Oregon State, they rose to sixth before clinching the conference title in the Rose Bowl decider over sophomore QB Sonny Sixkiller and Washington, 29–22. Stanford then suffered a pair of letdowns, losing to #13 Air Force 31–14 and to arch rival California, 22–14. The Pac-8 standings were so tightly bunched, that a win by either Oregon, UCLA, or Washington over Stanford would have sent that team to the Rose Bowl.

== Scoring ==
=== First quarter ===
- Stanford – Jackie Brown 4-yard run (Steve Horowitz kick), 10:20
- Stanford – Horowitz 37-yard field goal, 6:50
- Ohio State – John Brockington 1-yard run (Fred Schram kick), 3:45

=== Second quarter ===
- Ohio State – Brockington 1-yard run (Schram kick), 14:24

=== Third quarter ===
- Stanford – Horowitz 48-yard field goal, 12:29
- Ohio State – Schram 32-yard field goal, 8:33

=== Fourth quarter ===
- Stanford – Brown 1-yard run (Horowitz kick), 10:03
- Stanford – Randy Vataha 10-yard pass from Jim Plunkett (Horowitz kick), 8:18

== Statistics ==
Statistics	Stanford	Ohio State
First downs	21	22
Rushes–yards	37–143	67–364
Passing yards	265	75
Passes	20–30–1	7–20–1
Total yards	408	439
Punts–average	3–33	2–28
Fumbles–lost	3–2	2–0
Turnovers by	3	1
Yards penalized	3–46	6–68

== Aftermath ==
Ohio State was crowned National Champions prior to the bowl game by National Football Foundation along with Texas. Stanford repeated as Rose Bowl champions the following year, led by fifth-year senior quarterback Don Bunce, who redshirted this season.

== Notes ==
- Plunkett is Stanford’s only Heisman Trophy winner, and is the only player to be named MVP of the Rose Bowl and Super Bowl (XV); he was the first overall pick of the 1971 NFL draft.
