= Jerry Frei =

American football player, coach, and scout (1924–2001)

- Frei, c. 1967

Biographical details
- Born: June 3, 1924; Oregon, Wisconsin, U.S.
- Died: February 16, 2001 (aged 76); Denver, Colorado, U.S.

Playing career
- 1942: Wisconsin
- 1946–1947: Wisconsin
- Position: Guard

Coaching career (HC unless noted)
- 1948–1949: Grant HS (OR) (assistant)
- 1950–1951: Lincoln HS (OR)
- 1952–1954: Willamette (line)
- 1955–1966: Oregon (assistant)
- 1967–1971: Oregon
- 1972–1975: Denver Broncos (assistant)
- 1976–1977: Tampa Bay Buccaneers (assistant)
- 1978–1980: Chicago Bears (assistant)
- 1981–1982: Denver Broncos (assistant)

Administrative career (AD unless noted)
- 1983–2001: Denver Broncos (scout)

Head coaching record
- Overall: 22–29–2 (college)

Accomplishments and honors

Championships
- 2× Super Bowl champion (XXXII, XXXIII)
- Military career
- Allegiance: United States
- Branch: U.S. Army Air Forces
- Service years: 1943–1945
- Rank: Lieutenant
- Unit: 6th Photographic Group
- Conflicts: World War II: Pacific theater
- Awards: Air Medal (3)

Gerald L. Frei (June 3, 1924 – February 16, 2001) was an American football player and coach. He served as the head football coach at the University of Oregon for five seasons, 1967 through 1971, compiling a record of 22–29–2. At Oregon, Frei coached Dan Fouts and Ahmad Rashad. He later worked in the National Football League (NFL) as an assistant coach and scout, mostly with the Denver Broncos.

== Early years ==
Frei spent his early years in the village of Brooklyn, then moved with his family to Stoughton, southeast of Madison. Frei graduated from Stoughton High School in 1941, shortly before his 17th birthday, and was a classmate of Marian Benson, whom he married in 1945. He was inducted into the Stoughton Hall of Fame after his death.

=== Wisconsin Badgers ===
Frei played college football at the University of Wisconsin in Madison, and was a guard for the Badgers as a sophomore in 1942. The team starred two-time All American end Dave Schreiner and halfback Elroy "Crazylegs" Hirsch, finished with an 8–1–1 record, ranked third in the final AP poll, and was named the national champion by the Helms Athletic Foundation. The Badgers beat the AP national champion, Ohio State, 17–7, but lost to unheralded Iowa, 6–0 and tied Notre Dame, 7–7. That glorious Badger season was played in a final-fling atmosphere on campus with many students, including football players, already enlisted in the service and awaiting their callups to active duty during World War II. Only one player from that Badgers team still was on the Wisconsin roster in 1943. Frei was only age 18, but like most of his teammates, he went on active duty in early 1943.

=== World War II ===
Frei served as a pilot in the U.S. Army Air Forces, after training flying 67 reconnaissance missions in the Pacific theater for the 26th Photographic Reconnaissance Squadron (26th PRS) of the Fifth Air Force's 6th Photographic Group. In the unarmed version of the P-38, he made solo or tandem flights over Japanese targets to take photographs in advance of bombing missions. He was awarded the Air Medal with two Oak Leaf clusters, meaning he in essence earned the medal three times.

=== Return to Wisconsin ===
After the war, Frei returned to Wisconsin, where he played football for the Badgers in 1946 and 1947, and graduated in 1948.

== Coaching career ==
=== Early coaching positions ===
Journeying to Oregon at the recommendation of a fellow pilot, Don Garbarino, Frei quickly became a popular high school football coach at Grant High School in Portland. He was an assistant to Ted Ogdahl, who himself earned a Silver Star for wartime service in the Pacific fighting, as the Generals—with future Oregon Duck and NFL quarterback George Shaw starring—won the Oregon state championship in 1949. Frei became head coach at Lincoln High School in 1950, then line coach at Willamette University in Salem in 1952.

=== Oregon ===
Frei joined the popular, respected, and successful Len Casanova's football staff at the University of Oregon in Eugene as freshman coach in 1955 and became offensive line coach the next year. When Casanova became athletic director, Frei was named UO's 25th head coach in January 1967, the first year at the new Autzen Stadium, north of campus. The previous venue, Hayward Field, was a track and field shrine, but woefully inadequate and a recruiting handicap for football in Casanova's final seasons. Recovering from a 2-8 start in 1967, Frei's teams had a 22–29–2 record for his five seasons as head coach. His 1970 team defeated both UCLA and USC, plus then-unbeaten and highly-ranked Air Force late in the season, and finished in a tie for second in the Pacific-8 Conference in an era when only the league champion (Stanford in 1970) went to a bowl game (through 1974), the Rose Bowl. Frei was named UPI's national coach of the week twice that season, following the wins over USC and Air Force.

Frei himself was known to be conservative, but his philosophy was that especially because he had flown in combat when younger than many of his players and had been forced to grow up fast; he wasn't going to try to control his young players' lives, dictate their hairstyles, or attempt to censor their political views away from the field. He steadfastly refused to call his players "kids," and some made fun of or never understood his unvarying references to them as "young men." His positive impact on his players during turbulent times was long-lasting.

In a pattern that would continue for most of his NFL coaching and administrative career, his official Oregon coaching biography published in media guides and programs made no mention of his military service during World War II and made no attempt to explain the four-year gap between his sophomore and junior seasons as a Wisconsin player. He never brought it up and most of his players were astounded to hear about it later—much later.

Frei was on the staff at Oregon for 17 seasons, twelve as an assistant and five as head coach.

==== Resignation ====
Frei resigned as head coach on January 19, 1972. That was two months after the end of the 1971 season, which included road losses to national champion Nebraska and national power Texas in "paycheck" games deemed necessary for the then-strapped Oregon athletic department. The final game was a 30–29 home loss to Oregon State in the Civil War, with halfback Ahmad Rashad (then known as Bobby Moore) unable to play because a bruised thigh. It was Oregon State's eighth consecutive win in the series.

Popular in Eugene after seventeen years on staff, Frei had seemed destined to remain as head coach, but his resignation followed a dispute with second-year athletic director Norv Ritchey, who recommended that Frei fire assistant coaches to deflect criticism and mollify some disgruntled boosters, primarily in Portland. The ridiculousness of that request became clear later; his final Oregon staff included future NFL head coaches John Robinson, George Seifert, and Gunther Cunningham, future NFL defensive coordinator John Marshall, and Bruce Snyder, a future head coach at Utah State, California, and Arizona State.

Radical student body president Iain Moore issued a statement to the Oregon media, declaring: "In an un-ideal situation, Jerry Frei ran as ideal a program as possible with the broad interests of the participants pre-eminent in his mind and actions. The Oregon program will be all the poorer for his departure and his reputation has been besmirched in the process."

=== National Football League ===
Frei was an assistant coach with the Broncos (1972–1975), expansion Tampa Bay Buccaneers (1976–1977), and Chicago Bears (1978–1980), returning to the Broncos in 1981. He was a Broncos offensive line coach under John Ralston and Dan Reeves before going into scouting and administration, and he wound down his full-time career as the team's director of college scouting. After his retirement, Frei served as a consultant until his death at age 76 in 2001.

== Family ==
Frei's widow, Marian, died at age 87, in Lakewood, Colorado, in March 2011. They are buried at Fort Logan National Cemetery in Denver.

Frei's sons are David Frei, host of The National Dog Show Presented by Purina, former host of The Westminster Kennel Club Dog Show, and AKC-licensed judge; and journalist Terry Frei, whose seven books include "Third Down and a War to Go ," about the 1942 Wisconsin Badgers. Frei's daughters are Judy Frei Kaplan of Centennial, Colorado, a retired teacher who now is a community activist and volunteer; Susan Frei Earley, a former Colorado Ballet principal now with the Tulsa Ballet as artistic director and rehearsal coordinator; and Nancy McCormick of Wadsworth, Illinois, a litigation paralegal at Bartlit Beck LLP in Chicago.

== Head coaching record ==
=== College ===
Year	Team	Overall	Conference	Standing	Bowl/playoffs
Oregon Ducks (AAWU / Pacific-8 Conference) (1967–1971)
1967	Oregon	2–8	1–5	T–7th	
1968	Oregon	4–6	2–4	T–5th	
1969	Oregon	5–5–1	2–3	5th	
1970	Oregon	6–4–1	4–3	T–2nd	
1971	Oregon	5–6	2–4	6th	
Oregon:		22–29–2	11–19		
Total:		22–29–2			
