= Animal Care and Control =

Animal Care and Control may refer to:

- Boston Animal Care and Control
- Chicago Animal Care and Control
- Detroit Animal Care and Control
