= 1971 Oakland Raiders season =

NFL team season

- Owner: F. Wayne Valley
- General manager: Al Davis
- Head coach: John Madden
- Home stadium: Oakland–Alameda County Coliseum

Results
- Record: 8–4–2
- Division place: 2nd AFC West
- Playoffs: Did not qualify

The 1971 Oakland Raiders season was the team's 12th season. The Raiders failed to make the playoffs as their main rivals, the Kansas City Chiefs, won the division title.

This was the only season between 1966 and 1977 in which the Raiders did not win the AFL/AFC West title.

This would be the final season where Wayne Valley was the majority owner of the Raiders the next season, he would be pushed out in favor of general manager Al Davis who by 1976 bought out the remaining shares from Valley to become the sole owner.

== Offseason ==
=== Draft ===
1971 Oakland Raiders draft
Round	Pick	Player	Position	College	Notes
1	19	Jack Tatum *	DB	Ohio State	
2	45	Phil Villapiano *	LB	Bowling Green	
3	73	Warren Koegel	C	Penn State	
4	97	Clarence Davis	RB	USC	
5	123	Bob Moore	TE	Stanford	
6	149	Greg Slough	LB	USC	
7	157	Don Martin	DB	Yale	
9	227	Dave Garnett	RB	Pittsburgh	
10	238	Bill West	DB	Tennessee State	
10	253	Tim Oesterling	DT	UCLA	
11	279	Jim Poston	DT	South Carolina	
12	305	Horace Jones	DE	Louisville	
13	334	Mick Natzel	DB	Central Michigan	
14	357	Tom Gipson	DT	North Texas State	
15	383	Andy Giles	LB	William & Mary	
16	412	Tony Stawarz	DB	Miami (FL)	
17	442	Charles Hill	WR	Sam Houston State	
Made roster * Made at least one Pro Bowl during career

== Personnel ==
=== Staff / Coaches ===
1971 Oakland Raiders staff
Front office: Majority Co-Owner - F. Wayne Valley; Minority Co-Owner/General Manager - Al Davis; Minority Co-Owner - Ed McGah; President of the General Partner / General Manager – Al Davis; Senior Executive – John Herrera; Scout/ Executive assistant, Personnel Director - Ken Herock; Head coaches: Head coach – John Madden; Offensive coaches: Offensive Backs – John Polonchek; Receivers Coach – Mike Holovak; Offensive line – Ollie Spencer	Defensive coaches: Defensive Line – Tom Dahms; Linebackers – Ray Malavasi; Defensive Backfield – Bob Zeman; Special teams coaches: Special teams – None - N/A

=== Roster ===
1971 Oakland Raiders roster
Quarterbacks (QB): 16 George Blanda K; 3 Daryle Lamonica; 12 Ken Stabler; Running backs (RB): 40 Pete Banaszak; 28 Clarence Davis; 32 Don Highsmith; 44 Marv Hubbard; 23 Charlie Smith; Wide receivers (WR): 25 Fred Biletnikoff; 89 Drew Buie; 13 Rod Sherman; Tight ends (TE): 87 Raymond Chester; 88 Bob Moore	Offensive linemen (OL): 76 Bob Brown T; 64 George Buehler G; 70 Jim Harvey G; 77 Ron Mix T; 00 Jim Otto C; 78 Art Shell T; 63 Gene Upshaw G; Defensive linemen (DL): 83 Ben Davidson DE; 82 Horace Jones DE; 74 Tom Keating DT; 85 Carleton Oats DT; 67 Harold Rice DE; 80 Art Thoms DT	Linebackers (LB): 50 Duane Benson OLB; 55 Dan Conners MLB; 46 Bill Enyart OLB; 86 Gerald Irons OLB; 54 Terry Mendenhall OLB; 58 Greg Slough MLB; 41 Phil Villapiano OLB; Defensive backs (DB): 43 George Atkinson SS; 24 Willie Brown CB; 42 Tommy Maxwell CB; 31 Jack Tatum FS; 20 Jimmy Warren CB; 48 Nemiah Wilson CB; Special teams (ST): 4 Jerry DePoyster P	Practice squad: 73 Tom Gipson DT; -- Jim Hines WR; 56 Warren Koegel C; 65 Paul Seiler C; -- Bill West S; Reserve: 84 Tony Cline DE (IR); 10 Eldridge Dickey WR (Susp.); 34 Gus Otto LB (IR); 81 Warren Wells WR (Susp.); Rookies in italics

== Regular season ==
=== Schedule ===
Week	Date	Opponent	Result	Record	Venue	Attendance	Recap
1	September 19	at New England Patriots	**L** 6–20	0–1	Shaefer Stadium	55,405	Recap
2	September 26	at **San Diego Chargers**	**W** 34–0	1–1	San Diego Stadium	54,084	Recap
3	October 4	at Cleveland Browns	**W** 34–20	2–1	Cleveland Municipal Stadium	84,285	Recap
4	October 10	at **Denver Broncos**	**W** 27–16	3–1	Mile High Stadium	51,200	Recap
5	October 17	Philadelphia Eagles	**W** 34–10	4–1	Oakland–Alameda County Coliseum	54,615	Recap
6	October 24	Cincinnati Bengals	**W** 31–27	5–1	Oakland–Alameda County Coliseum	54,699	Recap
7	October 31	**Kansas City Chiefs**	**T** 20–20	5–1–1	Oakland–Alameda County Coliseum	54,715	Recap
8	November 7	at New Orleans Saints	**T** 21–21	5–1–2	Tulane Stadium	83,102	Recap
9	November 14	Houston Oilers	**W** 41–21	6–1–2	Oakland–Alameda County Coliseum	54,705	Recap
10	November 21	**San Diego Chargers**	**W** 34–33	7–1–2	Oakland–Alameda County Coliseum	54,681	Recap
11	November 28	Baltimore Colts	**L** 14–37	7–2–2	Oakland–Alameda County Coliseum	54,689	Recap
12	December 5	at Atlanta Falcons	**L** 13–24	7–3–2	Atlanta Stadium	58,850	Recap
13	December 12	at **Kansas City Chiefs**	**L** 14–16	7–4–2	Municipal Stadium	51,215	Recap
14	December 19	**Denver Broncos**	**W** 21–13	8–4–2	Oakland–Alameda County Coliseum	54,651	Recap
Note: Intra-division opponents are in **bold** text.

The sites of the two games with the Denver Broncos were switched.

=== Game notes ===
==== Week 2 ====
Team	1	2	3	4	Total
• Raiders	3	3	14	14	34
Chargers	0	0	0	0	0

- Date: September 26
- Location: San Diego Stadium, San Diego, California
- Game start: 1:00 p.m. PDT
- Game attendance: 54,084
- Game weather: 68 °F (20 °C), wind 10 mph (16 km/h)
- Referee: Jack Vest

Scoring summary
1	OAK	George Blanda 37-yard field goal	Raiders 3–0
2	OAK	George Blanda 42-yard field goal	Raiders 6–0
3	OAK	Fred Biletnikoff 36-yard pass from Daryle Lamonica (George Blanda kick)	Raiders 13–0
3	OAK	Clarence Davis 2-yard run (George Blanda kick)	Raiders 20–0
4	OAK	Fred Biletnikoff 13-yard pass from Daryle Lamonica (George Blanda kick)	Raiders 27–0
4	OAK	Ken Stabler 1-yard run (George Blanda kick)	Raiders 34–0

==== Week 4 ====
Team	1	2	3	4	Total
• **Raiders**	3	3	14	7	27
Broncos	3	6	0	7	16

- Date: October 10
- Location: Mile High Stadium, Denver, Colorado
- Game start: 2:00 p.m. MDT
- Game attendance: 51,200
- Game weather: 58 °F (14 °C), wind 9 mph (14 km/h)
- Referee: Jim Tunney
- Source: Pro-Football-Reference.com

Scoring summary
1	Broncos	Jim Turner 43-yard field goal	Broncos 3–0
1	Raiders	George Blanda 38-yard field goal	Tie 3–3
2	Broncos	Jim Turner 10-yard field goal	Broncos 6–3
2	Broncos	Jim Turner 24-yard field goal	Broncos 9–3
2	Raiders	George Blanda 24-yard field goal	Broncos 9–6
3	Raiders	Ken Stabler 2-yard run (George Blanda kick)	Raiders 13–9
3	Raiders	Raymond Chester 9-yard pass from Ken Stabler (George Blanda kick)	Raiders 20–9
4	Raiders	Jimmy Warren 55-yard interception return (George Blanda kick)	Raiders 27–9
4	Broncos	Dickie Post 13-yard pass from Steve Ramsey (Jim Turner kick)	Raiders 27–16

External videos
- 1971 Raiders at Broncos - NFL Films highlights

==== Week 14 ====
Team	1	2	3	4	Total
Broncos	3	0	0	10	13
• **Raiders**	7	7	0	7	21

- Date: December 19
- Location: Oakland–Alameda County Coliseum, Oakland, California
- Game start: 1:00 p.m. PST
- Game attendance: 54,651
- Game weather: 44 °F (7 °C), wind 4 mph (6.4 km/h)
- Referee: John McDonough
- Source: Pro-Football-Reference.com

Scoring summary
1	Raiders	Raymond Chester 67-yard pass from Daryle Lamonica (George Blanda kick)	Raiders 7–0
1	Broncos	Jim Turner 14-yard field goal	Raiders 7–3
2	Raiders	Charlie Smith 1-yard run (George Blanda kick)	Raiders 14–3
4	Broncos	Jim Turner 29-yard field goal	Raiders 14–6
4	Raiders	Pete Banaszak 2-yard run (George Blanda kick)	Raiders 21–6
4	Broncos	Clem Turner 7-yard pass from Steve Ramsey (Jim Turner kick)	Raiders 21–13

=== Standings ===
AFC West
	W	L	T	PCT	DIV	CONF	PF	PA	STK
Kansas City Chiefs	10	3	1	.769	4–1–1	8–2–1	302	208	W3
Oakland Raiders	8	4	2	.667	4–1–1	7–3–1	344	278	W1
San Diego Chargers	6	8	0	.429	2–4	4–7	311	341	L1
Denver Broncos	4	9	1	.308	1–5	3–6–1	203	275	L2

Note: Tie games were not officially counted in the standings until 1972.
