= CACC =

CACC may refer to:

- Calcium-activated chloride channel, a cellular ion signalling pathway
- Campaign against Climate Change, a UK pressure group that aims to raise public awareness of global warming through mobilising mass demonstrations
- A Canada (CA) Ministry of Health Communication Centre
- Center for Animal Care and Control (now Animal Care Centers of NYC), the non-profit operator of New York City's municipal shelter system
- Central Alabama Community College, a two-year institution of higher learning located in Alexander City, Alabama.
- Central Atlantic Collegiate Conference, a US intercollegiate athletic conference affiliated with the NCAA's Division II
- Chicago Animal Care and Control
- Citizens for Alternatives to Chemical Contamination, a Michigan environmental group
- Commercial Aircraft Corporation of China Ltd., a Chinese company manufacturing large passenger aircraft
- Commander, Air Component Command, a US military abbreviation (see 607th Air Intelligence Squadron)
- Correlated Active Clause Coverage, A Logic Coverage Criterion from Software Testing
- Cooperative Adaptive Cruise Control, an extension of Adaptive Cruise Control in which vehicles exchange information
- Chin Association for Christian Communication, a non-profit organization for Chin people in Burma.
- Cliftonville Academy Cricket Club
