= 1970 California Golden Bears football team =

American college football season

1970 California Golden Bears football
- Conference: Pacific-8 Conference
- Record: 6–5 (4–3 Pac-8)
- Head coach: Ray Willsey (7th season)
- Home stadium: California Memorial Stadium

1970 Pacific-8 Conference football standings
	Conf.					Overall
Team	W		L		T	W		L		T
No. 8 Stanford $	6	–	1	–	0	9	–	3	–	0
Washington	4	–	3	–	0	6	–	4	–	0
Oregon	4	–	3	–	0	6	–	4	–	1
UCLA	4	–	3	–	0	6	–	5	–	0
California	4	–	3	–	0	6	–	5	–	0
No. 15 USC	3	–	4	–	0	6	–	4	–	1
Oregon State	3	–	4	–	0	6	–	5	–	0
Washington State	0	–	7	–	0	1	–	10	–	0
$ – Conference champion; Rankings from AP Poll

The 1970 California Golden Bears football team was an American football team that represented the University of California, Berkeley in the Pacific-8 Conference (Pac-8) during the 1970 NCAA University Division football season. In their seventh year under head coach Ray Willsey, the Golden Bears compiled a 6–5 record (4–3 in Pac-8, second) and were outscored 272 to 249. Home games were played on campus at California Memorial Stadium in Berkeley, California.

At home for the Big Game, Cal upset #11 Stanford 22–14, the Pac-8 champion led by Heisman Trophy winner Jim Plunkett. On New Year's Day, Stanford upset undefeated Ohio State in the Rose Bowl and quarterback Plunkett was the first pick in the 1971 NFL draft.

California's statistical leaders on offense were quarterback Dave Penhall with 1,785 passing yards, Stan Murphy with 603 rushing yards, and Steve Sweeney with 679 receiving yards.

== Schedule ==
Date	Time	Opponent	Site	Result	Attendance	Source
September 12	8:01 p.m.	at Oregon	Civic Stadium; Portland, OR	L 24–31	26,556	
September 19	2:00 p.m.	at No. 2 Texas*	Memorial Stadium; Austin, TX	L 15–56	61,000	
September 26	1:31 p.m.	Indiana*	California Memorial Stadium; Berkeley, CA	W 56–14	30,000	
October 3	5:30 p.m.	at Rice*	Rice Stadium; Houston, TX	L 0–28	22,000	
October 10	1:31 p.m.	at Washington	University of Washington Stadium; Seattle, WA	W 31–28	54,000	
October 17	1:31 p.m.	No. 19 UCLA	California Memorial Stadium; Berkeley, CA (rivalry)	L 21–24	43,000	
October 24	1:32 p.m.	Washington State	California Memorial Stadium; Berkeley, CA	W 45–0	26,000	
October 31	1:23 p.m.	at No. 18 USC	Los Angeles Memorial Coliseum; Los Angeles, CA	W 13–10	54,750	
November 7	1:30 p.m.	at Oregon State	Parker Stadium; Corvallis, OR	L 10–16	20,202	
November 14	1:27 p.m.	San Jose State*	California Memorial Stadium; Berkeley, CA	W 35–28	16,841–18,842	
November 21	1:30 p.m.	No. 11 Stanford	California Memorial Stadium; Berkeley, CA (Big Game)	W 22–14	76,800	
*Non-conference game; Rankings from AP Poll released prior to the game; All times are in Pacific time

== Roster ==
1970 California Golden Bears football team roster
Players
Coaches
Offense

Pos.	#	Name	Class
WR		Ken Adams
TE		Jim Brady
TE		John Conley
RB	36	Isaac Curtis	So
QB		Steve Curtis
RB		Bob Darby
WR		Geoff DeLapp
WR		Jim Fraser
OL		Greg Hendren
RB		Steve Kemnitzer
OL		Skip Leonard
RB		Stan Murphy
QB		Dave Penhall
OL		Rob Purnell
OL		Bob Richards
OL		Steve Sawin
RB		Smith
OL		Eric Swanson
WR	88	Steve Sweeney	So
RB		Tim Todd	Jr

Defense

Pos.	#	Name	Class
DB		Joe Acker
DL		Dennis Acree
DB		Andy Anderson
DB		Jerome Carter
LB	60	Phil Croyle	Sr
DL		Sam Garamendi
DL		Tom Grieb
LB		Tom Hawkins
DT	69	Bob Kampa	So
DL		Steve Reece
DL		Bob Rogers
DL		Dave Seppi
DB		Scott Stringer	So
LB	18	Loren Toews	So
DL		Dick Wagner
DL		O.Z. White
DT	74	Sherman White	Jr
DB		Ray Youngblood

Special teams

Pos.	#	Name	Class
K	2	Randy Wersching	So

Head coach

- Ray Willsey

Coordinators/assistant coaches

Legend

- (C) Team captain
- (S) Suspended
- (I) Ineligible
- Injured
- Redshirt
