= Randy Vataha =

American football player (born 1948)

No. 18
- Position: Wide receiver

Personal information
- Born: December 4, 1948 (age 77); Santa Monica, California, U.S.
- Listed height: 5 ft 10 in (1.78 m)
- Listed weight: 176 lb (80 kg)

Career information
- High school: Rancho Alamitos (Garden Grove, California)
- College: Golden West JC; Stanford
- NFL draft: 1971: 17th round, 418th overall pick

Career history
- Los Angeles Rams (1971)*; New England Patriots (1971–1976); Green Bay Packers (1977)
- * Offseason or practice squad member only

Awards and highlights
- AFC All-Rookie (UPI) – 1971; New England Patriots All-1970s Team; First-team All-Pac-8 (1970)

Career NFL statistics
- Receptions: 188
- Receiving yards: 3,164
- Receiving TDs: 23
- Stats at Pro Football Reference

Randel Edward Vataha (born December 4, 1948) is an American former professional football player who was a wide receiver for seven seasons in the National Football League (NFL), primarily with the New England Patriots. He played college football for the Stanford Indians (now Cardinal). Vataha was selected in the 17th round of the 1971 NFL draft and spent the first six years of his NFL career with New England. He finished his career after a season with the Green Bay Packers.

== Early life ==
Born in Santa Monica, California, Vataha lettered in four sports at Rancho Alamitos High School in Garden Grove; he was a quarterback in football and graduated in 1967.

== College career ==
Vataha made the transition to wide receiver at Golden West Junior College in Huntington Beach, then transferred up the coast to Stanford of the Pacific-8 Conference in 1969 under head coach John Ralston and became one of quarterback Jim Plunkett's favorite receiving targets. As seniors in 1970, they connected on a 96-yard touchdown pass, a Stanford record which stood until 1999 (by a 98-yard pass from Joe Borchard to Troy Walters).

At the end of that season, Vataha scored the last touchdown in Stanford's 27–17 upset of #2 Ohio State in the Rose Bowl, a ten-yard pass from Plunkett with eight minutes remaining; both are members of the Stanford Athletic Hall of Fame. Plunkett won the Heisman Trophy and was the first pick of the 1971 NFL draft; Stanford climbed to eighth in the final AP poll with a 9–3 record.

Vataha was nicknamed "Rabbit" for his moves on the field and worked one summer at Disneyland in costume as one of the Seven Dwarfs (Bashful).

== NFL career ==
Vataha was selected in the 17th round of that NFL draft (418th overall) by the Los Angeles Rams. Released in training camp, he was signed as a free agent by the New England Patriots, where he was reunited with Plunkett. He was named to UPI's AFC all-rookie team in 1971 and played six seasons with the Patriots. Vataha caught 178 receptions for 3,055 yards. He also had 23 touchdown receptions while with the Patriots. He was waived by the Patriots before the start of the 1977 season and signed with the Green Bay Packers. He ended his career with the Green Bay Packers in 1977.

Vataha, along with Stanley Morgan, was one of two wide receivers named to the New England Patriots 1970’s All-Decade Team.

== NFL career statistics ==
Legend
**Bold**	Career high

Year	Team	Games		Receiving				
Year	Team	GP	GS	Rec	Yds	Avg	Lng	TD
1971	NWE	**14**	13	**51**	**872**	17.1	**88**	**9**
1972	NWE	**14**	**14**	25	369	14.8	44	2
1973	NWE	**14**	4	20	341	17.1	48	2
1974	NWE	12	10	25	561	**22.4**	59	3
1975	NWE	**14**	**14**	46	720	15.7	47	6
1976	NWE	12	8	11	192	17.5	44	1
1977	GNB	6	3	10	109	10.9	20	0
		86	66	188	3,164	16.8	88	23

== After football ==
After retiring from football, Vataha was a founding member of the United States Football League (USFL) in 1983, owning 50% of the Boston Breakers. He is now the president of Game Plan LLC, a company that specializes in the buying and selling of professional sports teams.
