= Bob Newland =

American football player (1948–2021)

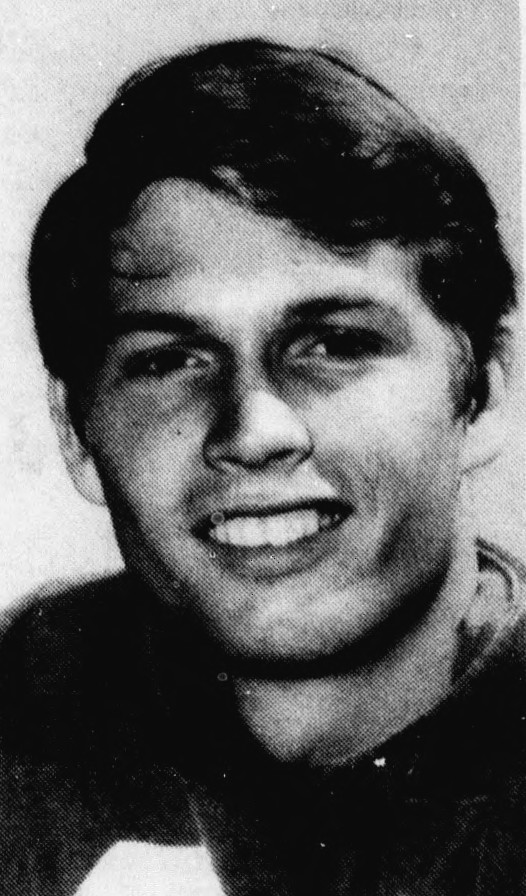
- Newland in 1970

No. 41
- Position: Wide receiver

Personal information
- Born: October 27, 1948; Medford, Oregon, U.S.
- Died: June 30, 2021 (aged 72); Eugene, Oregon, U.S.

Career information
- High school: North Eugene (OR)
- College: Oregon
- NFL draft: 1971: 7th round, 172nd overall pick

Career history
- New Orleans Saints (1971–1974)

Awards and highlights
- Second-team All-American (1970); First-team All-Pac-8 (1970)

Career NFL statistics
- Receptions: 124
- Receiving yards: 1,877
- Touchdowns: 8
- Stats at Pro Football Reference

Robert Vaughn Newland (October 27, 1948 – June 30, 2021) was an American professional football player who was a wide receiver in the National Football League (NFL). He was selected by the New Orleans Saints in the seventh round of the 1971 NFL draft. He played college football for the Oregon Ducks.

== Early life ==
Newland attended North Eugene High School in Eugene, Oregon. He went to college at the University of Oregon, where he was the most valuable player for the Ducks in 1970.

== Death ==
Newland died on June 30, 2021, aged 72.
