= 1970 Stanford Indians football team =

American college football season

1970 Stanford Indians football

Pac-8 champion Rose Bowl champion

Rose Bowl, W 27–17 vs. Ohio State
- Conference: Pacific-8 Conference

Ranking
- Coaches: No. 10
- AP: No. 8
- Record: 9–3 (6–1 Pac-8)
- Head coach: John Ralston (8th season)
- Captains: Jim Plunkett; Jack Schultz
- Home stadium: Stanford Stadium

1970 Pacific-8 Conference football standings
| | Conf. | | | | | Overall |
| Team | W | | L | | T | W | | L | | T |
|---|---|---|---|---|---|---|---|---|---|---|
| No. 8 Stanford $ | 6 | – | 1 | – | 0 | 9 | – | 3 | – | 0 |
| Washington | 4 | – | 3 | – | 0 | 6 | – | 4 | – | 0 |
| Oregon | 4 | – | 3 | – | 0 | 6 | – | 4 | – | 1 |
| UCLA | 4 | – | 3 | – | 0 | 6 | – | 5 | – | 0 |
| California | 4 | – | 3 | – | 0 | 6 | – | 5 | – | 0 |
| No. 15 USC | 3 | – | 4 | – | 0 | 6 | – | 4 | – | 1 |
| Oregon State | 3 | – | 4 | – | 0 | 6 | – | 5 | – | 0 |
| Washington State | 0 | – | 7 | – | 0 | 1 | – | 10 | – | 0 |
$ – Conference champion; Rankings from AP Poll

The 1970 Stanford Indians football team represented Stanford University during the 1970 NCAA University Division football season.

The Indians were 8–3 in the regular season and won the Pac-8 title by two games; their only conference loss was at rival California in the Big Game on November 21. In the Rose Bowl in Pasadena on New Year's Day, they upset No. 2 Ohio State.

With eighteen passing and three rushing touchdowns added to his 2,715 passing yards on the year (which broke his own conference record), Rose Bowl MVP Jim Plunkett was awarded the Heisman Trophy. The 1970 college season had been the "Year of the Quarterback," and Plunkett beat out Notre Dame's Joe Theismann and Archie Manning of Ole Miss to win the award.

Plunkett was the first Latino to win the Heisman Trophy; he also captured the Maxwell Award for the nation's best quarterback and was named player of the year by United Press International, The Sporting News, and SPORT magazine. In addition, the American College Football Coaches Association designated him as their Offensive Player of the Year.

Plunkett was the first overall pick of the 1971 NFL draft, selected by the Boston Patriots; the team relocated to the new Schaefer Stadium in Foxborough before the 1971 season began and became the New England Patriots.

== Schedule ==
| Date | Time | Opponent | Rank | Site | TV | Result | Attendance | Source |
|---|---|---|---|---|---|---|---|---|
| September 12 | | at No. 4 Arkansas* | No. 10 | War Memorial Stadium; Little Rock, AR | ABC | W 34–28 | 48,000 | |
| September 19 | 1:35 p.m. | San Jose State* | No. 4 | Stanford Stadium; Stanford, CA (rivalry) | | W 34–3 | 46,000 | |
| September 26 | 1:30 p.m. | at Oregon | No. 3 | Autzen Stadium; Eugene, OR | | W 33–10 | 38,400 | |
| October 3 | | Purdue* | No. 3 | Stanford Stadium; Stanford, CA | | L 14–26 | 62,000 | |
| October 10 | | No. 4 USC | No. 12 | Stanford Stadium; Stanford, CA (rivalry) | | W 24–14 | 86,000 | |
| October 17 | 1:32 p.m. | at Washington State | No. 9 | Joe Albi Stadium; Spokane, WA | | W 63–16 | 30,400 | |
| October 24 | 8:00 p.m. | at No. 16 UCLA | No. 8 | Los Angeles Memorial Coliseum; Los Angeles, CA | | W 9–7 | 83,518 | |
| October 31 | 1:34 p.m. | Oregon State | No. 6 | Stanford Stadium; Stanford, CA | | W 48–10 | 65,000 | |
| November 7 | 1:29 p.m. | Washington | No. 6 | Stanford Stadium; Stanford, CA | ABC | W 29–22 | 58,000 | |
| November 14 | 12:00 p.m. | at No. 13 Air Force* | No. 6 | Falcon Stadium; Colorado Springs, CO | | L 14–31 | 41,638 | |
| November 21 | 1:30 p.m. | at California | No. 11 | California Memorial Stadium; Berkeley, CA (Big Game) | | L 14–22 | 76,800 | |
| January 1, 1971 | | vs. No. 2 Ohio State* | No. 12 | Rose Bowl; Pasadena, CA (Rose Bowl) | NBC | W 27–17 | 103,839 | |
*Non-conference game; Rankings from AP Poll released prior to the game; All times are in Pacific time

== Roster ==
1970 Stanford Cardinal football team roster
Players
Coaches
Offense

| Pos. | # | Name | Class |
|---|---|---|---|
| OL | | Doug Adams |
| RB | 33 | Jackie Brown | Jr |
| QB | 13 | Don Bunce | Jr |
| WR | | Eric Cross |
| QB | 11 | Jesse Freitas |
| OL | | Larry Jones |
| OL | | Steve Jubb |
| RB | | Jim Kehl |
| WR | | Jack Lasater |
| OL | | Dan Lightfoot |
| RB | | James Merrill |
| OL | | Bill Meyers |
| TE | 86 | Bob Moore | Sr |
| QB | 16 | Jim Plunkett (C) | Sr |
| OL | | John Sande |
| RB | | Reggie Sanderson |
| TE | | Bill Scott |
| OL | | Dennis Sheehan |
| FB | 38 | Hillary Shockley | Jr |
| OL | | Terrell Smith |
| WR | 18 | Randy Vataha | Sr |
| WR | | Demea Washington |

Defense

| Pos. | # | Name | Class |
|---|---|---|---|
| DL | | Bill Alexander |
| S | 29 | Benny Barnes | Jr |
| DL | 73 | Larry Butler | Jr |
| DB | | Mike Ewing |
| DL | | Jody Graves |
| LB | 87 | Ron Kadziel | Sr |
| DB | | Jim Kauffman |
| DE | 78 | Pete Lazetich | Jr |
| DB | | Charles McCloud |
| DL | | Tim McClure |
| LB | | Dennis Moore |
| DB | | Pat Moore |
| DB | | Steve Murray |
| DE | 91 | Greg Sampson | Jr |
| LB | | Phil Satre |
| DB | 44 | Jack Schultz (C) | Sr |
| ILB | 92 | Jeff Siemon | Jr |
| LB | | Mike Simone |
| DT | 76 | Dave Tipton | Sr |

Special teams

| Pos. | # | Name | Class |
|---|---|---|---|
| K | 56 | Steve Horowitz | Sr |
| P | 25 | Steve Murray | So |

Head coach

- John Ralston

Coordinators/assistant coaches

- Mike White – Offensive line
- Jack Christiansen – Offensive backfield
- Edward Peasley – Linebacker
- Bob Gambold – Defensive backs
- Bill Moultrie – Assistant
- Roger Theder – Wide receivers
- Max McCartney – Defensive line

Legend

- (C) Team captain
- (S) Suspended
- (I) Ineligible
- Injured
- Redshirt

== Awards and honors ==
- Jim Plunkett: Heisman Trophy, Walter Camp Award, Maxwell Award

== NFL draft ==
Five Stanford players were selected in the 1971 NFL draft.

| Player | Position | Round | Overall | Franchise |
|---|---|---|---|---|
| Jim Plunkett | Quarterback | 1 | 1 | New England Patriots |
| Dave Tipton | Defensive tackle | 4 | 96 | New York Giants |
| Bob Moore | Tight end | 5 | 123 | Oakland Raiders |
| Ron Kadziel | Linebacker | 5 | 129 | Dallas Cowboys |
| Randy Vataha | Wide receiver | 17 | 418 | Los Angeles Rams |

}
