= 1970 Washington Huskies football team =

American college football season

1970 Washington Huskies football
- Conference: Pacific-8 Conference
- Record: 6–4 (4–3 Pac-8)
- Head coach: Jim Owens (14th season)
- Captains: Bo Cornell; Tom Failla
- Home stadium: University of Washington Stadium

1970 Pacific-8 Conference football standings
	Conf.					Overall
Team	W		L		T	W		L		T
No. 8 Stanford $	6	–	1	–	0	9	–	3	–	0
Washington	4	–	3	–	0	6	–	4	–	0
Oregon	4	–	3	–	0	6	–	4	–	1
UCLA	4	–	3	–	0	6	–	5	–	0
California	4	–	3	–	0	6	–	5	–	0
No. 15 USC	3	–	4	–	0	6	–	4	–	1
Oregon State	3	–	4	–	0	6	–	5	–	0
Washington State	0	–	7	–	0	1	–	10	–	0
$ – Conference champion; Rankings from AP Poll

The 1970 Washington Huskies football team was an American football team that represented the University of Washington in the Pacific-8 Conference during the 1970 NCAA University Division football season. Led by fourteenth-year head coach Jim Owens, the Huskies compiled a 6–4 record (4–3 in Pac-8, tied for second), and outscored their opponents 334 to 216.

The Huskies were led on the field by sophomore quarterback Sonny Sixkiller, who set numerous team records. Fullback Bo Cornell and defensive tackle Tom Failla were the team captains.

This was the final year of a ten-game schedule for Washington; the other seven teams in the Pac-8 played eleven games.

== Schedule ==
Date	Time	Opponent	Site	Result	Attendance	Source
September 19		Michigan State*	University of Washington Stadium; Seattle, WA	W 42–16	52,000	
September 26		No. 10 Michigan*	University of Washington Stadium; Seattle, WA	L 3–17	57,500	
October 3		Navy*	University of Washington Stadium; Seattle, WA	W 56–7	57,000	
October 10	1:31 p.m.	California	University of Washington Stadium; Seattle, WA	L 28–31	54,000	
October 17		at No. 11 USC	Los Angeles Memorial Coliseum; Los Angeles, CA	L 25–28	56,166	
October 24		at Oregon State	Parker Stadium; Corvallis, OR	W 29–20	27,911	
October 31		No. 16 Oregon	University of Washington Stadium; Seattle, WA (rivalry)	W 25–23	58,580	
November 7	1:29 p.m.	at No. 6 Stanford	Stanford Stadium; Stanford, CA	L 22–29	58,000	
November 14		No. 17 UCLA^{†}	University of Washington Stadium; Seattle, WA	W 61–20	59,250	
November 21		at Washington State	Joe Albi Stadium; Spokane, WA (Apple Cup)	W 43–25	33,200	
*Non-conference game; ^{†}Homecoming; Rankings from AP Poll released prior to the game; All times are in Pacific time

== Roster ==
1970 Washington Huskies football team roster
Players
Coaches
Offense

Pos.	#	Name	Class
QB	6	Sonny Sixkiller	So
QB	15	Greg Collins	So
FB	32	Bo Cornell (C)	Sr
HB	41	Darrell Downey	Jr
C	53	Bruce Jarvis	Sr
C	56	Al Kelso	So
G	65	Wayne Sortun	Sr
OT	72	Dan Cunningham	Sr
OT	76	Lane Ronnebaum	Sr
G	77	Ernie Janet	Sr
WR	83	Jim Krieg	Jr
TE	85	Ace Bulger	Sr
TE	87	John Brady	So

Defense

Pos.	#	Name	Class
CB	11	Bob Burmeister	Sr
SS	12	Mark McMahon	Sr
FS	18	Bill Cahill	So
CB	26	Calvin Jones	So
LB	36	Bob Ferguson	So
LB	37	Ron Shepherd	Jr
LB	48	Rick Huget	Jr
LB	51	Jim Katsenes	Sr
DT	59	Gordy Guinn	So
DE	84	Ken Lee	Sr
DT	91	Tom Failla (C)	Sr
DE	96	Al Kravitz	Jr
DE	97	Dave Worgan	So
DE	99	Kurt Matter	So

Special teams

Pos.	#	Name	Class
PK	10	Ron Volbrecht	Sr
P	14	Gene Willis	Sr
PK	16	Steve Wiezbowski	So
P	46	Dick Galuska	Jr

Head coach

- Jim Owens (14th year)

Coordinators/assistant coaches

- Mel Thompson
- Otto Kofler
- John Goodwin
- Bob Schloredt
- Jim Lambright
- Marv Weetman
- Jerry Cheek

Legend

- (C) Team captain
- (S) Suspended
- (I) Ineligible
- Injured
- Redshirt

== NFL draft selections ==
Four UW Huskies were selected in the 1971 NFL draft, which lasted 17 rounds with 442 selections.

Player	Position	Round	Pick	Franchise
Ernie Janet	Guard	2nd	37	San Francisco 49ers
Bo Cornell	Running back	2nd	40	Cleveland Browns
Bruce Jarvis	Center	3rd	53	Buffalo Bills
Ken Lee	Linebacker	8th	204	Detroit Lions

= Husky Hall of Fame

== Notes ==
- Sonny Sixkiller set a new University of Washington record for passing yards in a season with 2,303 yards. This eclipsed Don Heinrich's 1,846 yards from 1950. The record is currently held by Michael Penix, Jr.
