= 1970 Oregon State Beavers football team =

American college football season

1970 Oregon State Beavers football
- Conference: Pacific-8 Conference
- Record: 6–5 (3–4 Pac-8)
- Head coach: Dee Andros (6th season)
- Captain: Craig Hanneman
- Home stadium: Parker Stadium; Civic Stadium

1970 Pacific-8 Conference football standings
	Conf.					Overall
Team	W		L		T	W		L		T
No. 8 Stanford $	6	–	1	–	0	9	–	3	–	0
Washington	4	–	3	–	0	6	–	4	–	0
Oregon	4	–	3	–	0	6	–	4	–	1
UCLA	4	–	3	–	0	6	–	5	–	0
California	4	–	3	–	0	6	–	5	–	0
No. 15 USC	3	–	4	–	0	6	–	4	–	1
Oregon State	3	–	4	–	0	6	–	5	–	0
Washington State	0	–	7	–	0	1	–	10	–	0
$ – Conference champion; Rankings from AP Poll

The 1970 Oregon State Beavers football team represented Oregon State University in the Pacific-8 Conference (Pac-8) during the 1970 NCAA University Division football season. In their sixth season under head coach Dee Andros, the Beavers compiled a 6–5 record (3–4 in Pac-8, tied for sixth), and were outscored 239 to 211. They played five home games on campus at Parker Stadium in Corvallis and one at Civic Stadium in Portland.

The Beavers defeated rival Oregon in the Civil War game for the seventh straight year. This was Oregon State's fifth-straight winning season. They wouldn't have another until 1999.

== Schedule ==
Date	Time	Opponent	Site	Result	Attendance	Source
September 12		No. 18 UCLA	Parker Stadium; Corvallis, OR	L 9–14	23,520	
September 19		Iowa*	Civic Stadium; Portland, OR	W 21–14	23,279	
September 26		at No. 14 Oklahoma*	Oklahoma Memorial Stadium; Norman, OK	W 23–14	54,700	
October 3		at No. 5 USC	Los Angeles Memorial Coliseum; Los Angeles, CA	L 13–45	57,769	
October 10		Utah*	Parker Stadium; Corvallis, OR	W 31–21	23,897	
October 17		at No. 19 Houston*	Houston Astrodome; Houston, TX	L 16–19	37,791	
October 24		Washington	Parker Stadium; Corvallis, OR	L 20–29	27,911	
October 31	1:34 p.m.	at No. 6 Stanford	Stanford Stadium; Stanford, CA	L 10–48	65,000	
November 7	1:30 p.m.	California	Parker Stadium; Corvallis, OR	W 16–10	20,202	
November 14		at Washington State	Joe Albi Stadium; Spokane, WA	W 28–16	16,300	
November 21		Oregon	Parker Stadium; Corvallis, OR (Civil War)	W 24–9	40,299	
*Non-conference game; Rankings from AP Poll released prior to the game; All times are in Pacific time

== Roster ==
- Steve Brown, So. (defense)
- DL Craig Hanneman, Sr. (C)
- C Erin Haynes
