= Bob Pifferini Sr. =

American football player (1922–2017)

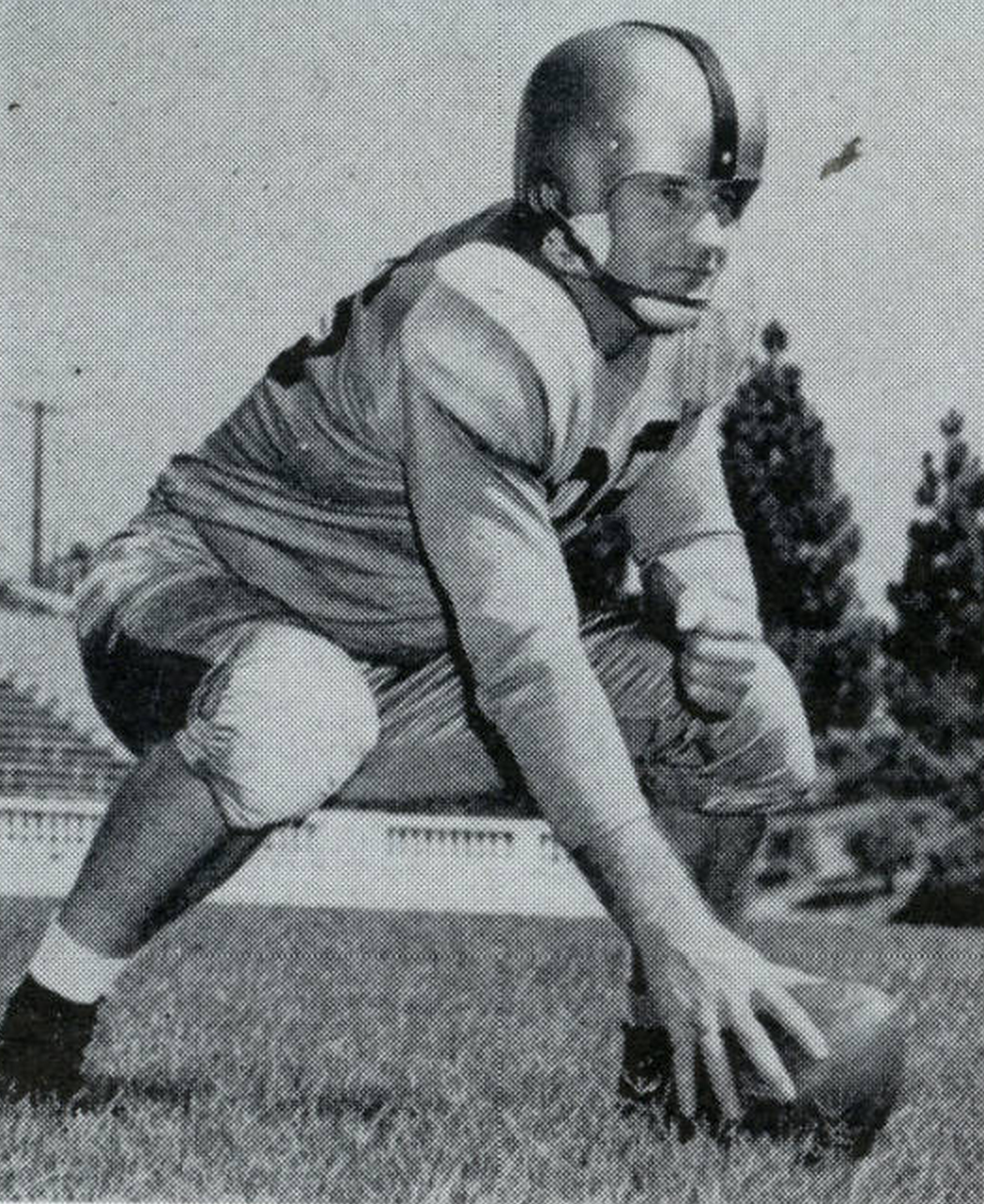
- Pifferini pictured in El Toro 1949, San Jose State yearbook

No. 53
- Position: Center

Personal information
- Born: October 1, 1922; Oakdale, California, U.S.
- Died: December 9, 2017 (aged 95); Capitola, California, U.S.
- Listed height: 6 ft 0 in (1.83 m)
- Listed weight: 210 lb (95 kg)

Career information
- High school: Modesto (CA)
- College: San Jose State
- NFL draft: 1949: 15th round, 142nd overall pick

Career history
- Detroit Lions (1949)

Career NFL statistics
- Games played: 12
- Fumble recoveries: 1
- Interceptions: 3
- Stats at Pro Football Reference

Robert M. Pifferini Sr. (October 1, 1922 – December 9, 2017) was an American professional football center who played one season with the Detroit Lions. He attended high school at Modesto High School in Modesto, California, and went on to be a three-sport athlete at San Jose State University, playing football, basketball and baseball for the Spartans.

He is the father of Bob Pifferini, also a professional football player. He was married to Gaynell until her death in 2009. Pifferini died on December 9, 2017, at the age of 95.
