= Horace Jones (American football) =

American football player (born 1949)

No. 82, 79
- Position: Defensive end

Personal information
- Born: July 31, 1949 (age 77); Pensacola, Florida, U.S.
- Listed height: 6 ft 3 in (1.91 m)
- Listed weight: 255 lb (116 kg)

Career information
- High school: Booker T. Washington (FL)
- College: Louisville
- NFL draft: 1971: 12th round, 305th overall pick

Career history
- Oakland Raiders (1971–1975); Seattle Seahawks (1977)

Awards and highlights
- Super Bowl champion (XI)

Career NFL statistics
- Games played: 71
- Games started: 59
- Fumble recoveries: 4
- Stats at Pro Football Reference

Horace Arthur Jones (born July 31, 1949) is an American former professional football player in the National Football League. He played defensive end for six seasons for the Oakland Raiders and Seattle Seahawks.

Jones had a football scholarship to play for the Louisville Cardinals. In 1971, Jones was selected 305th overall by the Raiders in the 12th round of the NFL draft.
