= Craig Hanneman =

American football player (born 1949)

No. 67, 74
- Positions: Defensive end, defensive tackle

Personal information
- Born: July 1, 1949 (age 77); Salem, Oregon, U.S.
- Listed height: 6 ft 3 in (1.91 m)
- Listed weight: 240 lb (109 kg)

Career information
- High school: South Salem
- College: Oregon State
- NFL draft: 1971: 6th round, 138th overall pick

Career history
- Pittsburgh Steelers (1972–1973); New England Patriots (1974–1975)

Awards and highlights
- Second-team All-American (1970); First-team All-Pac-8 (1970)

Career NFL statistics
- Sacks: 5.0
- Fumble recoveries: 3
- Stats at Pro Football Reference

Craig Lewis Hanneman (born July 1, 1949) is an American former professional football player who was a defensive lineman in the National Football League (NFL) from 1972 to 1975. He played college football for the Oregon State Beavers and played for two NFL teams in 52 games over four seasons.

Following his NFL career, Hanneman returned to Oregon where he worked as the Government Affairs Manager for Willamette Industries and later as the President of the Oregon Forest Industries Council. Hanneman also served as a Polk County Commissioner.

In 2012, Hanneman climbed Mount Everest. He is believed to be the first former NFL, NBA or major league athlete to reach the summit of the world's tallest mountain.

In 2019, three years after being diagnosed with ALS, he completed the Seven Summits at age 70.

In 2020, Hanneman was inducted into the State of Oregon Sports Hall of Fame.
