= Dave Tipton =

American football player (born 1949)

No. 71, 75
- Positions: Defensive end, defensive tackle

Personal information
- Born: April 23, 1949 (age 77); Hollister, California, U.S.
- Listed height: 6 ft 6 in (1.98 m)
- Listed weight: 245 lb (111 kg)

Career information
- High school: San Benito (Hollister)
- College: Stanford
- NFL draft: 1971: 4th round, 96th overall pick

Career history

Playing
- New York Giants (1971–1973); San Diego Chargers (1974–1975); Seattle Seahawks (1976)

Coaching
- California State Fullerton (1984–1987) Defensive line/Special teams coach; Oregon State (1988) Defensive line coach; Stanford (1989–1991) Linebacker coach; Stanford (1992–2006) Defensive Line coach

Awards and highlights
- First-team All-Pac-8 (1970)

Career NFL statistics
- Sacks: 6
- Fumble recoveries: 3
- Stats at Pro Football Reference

David Lance Tipton (born April 23, 1949) is an American former professional football player who was a defensive lineman for six seasons in the National Football League (NFL) with the New York Giants, the San Diego Chargers and the Seattle Seahawks from 1971 to 1976.

Tipton played college football for the Stanford Cardinal, playing as a member of the Thunderchickens defense line that helped Stanford to a Rose Bowl victory in 1971. After retiring from playing football, Tipton was an assistant football coach at Stanford from 1992 to 2006. Tipton now teaches history at St. Mary's High School in Stockton, California and is the Defensive Line Coach for the varsity football team. In 2008 his team earned the honor of playing in their State Division finals, and national television declared the team amazing in its progress and development within the two-year period of Dave's coaching influences.
