= 1970 Washington State Cougars football team =

American college football season

1970 Washington State Cougars football
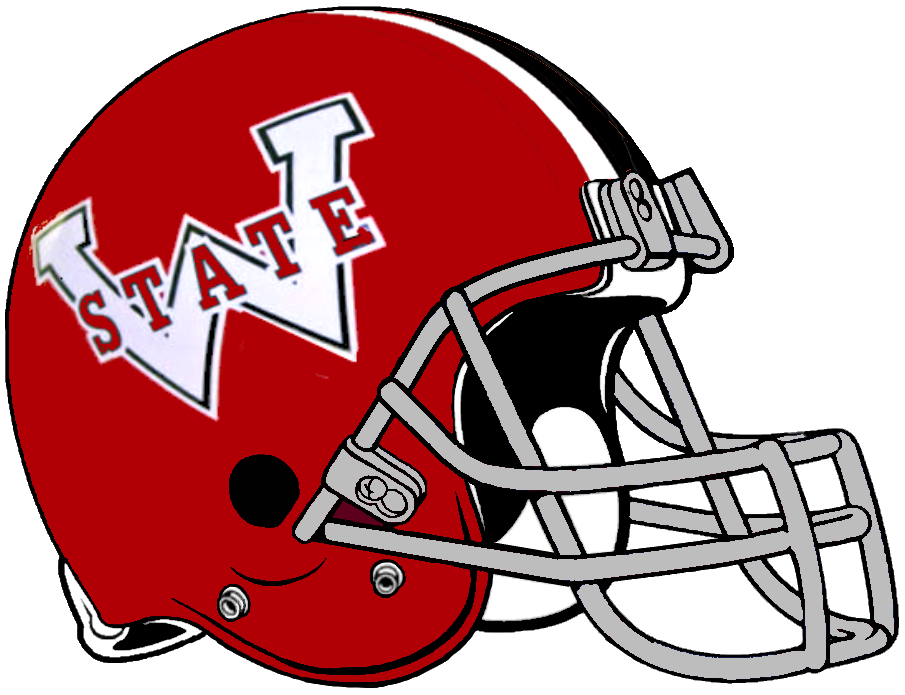
- Conference: Pacific-8 Conference
- Record: 1–10 (0–7 Pac-8)
- Head coach: Jim Sweeney (3rd season)
- Home stadium: Joe Albi Stadium

1970 Pacific-8 Conference football standings
	Conf.					Overall
Team	W		L		T	W		L		T
No. 8 Stanford $	6	–	1	–	0	9	–	3	–	0
Washington	4	–	3	–	0	6	–	4	–	0
Oregon	4	–	3	–	0	6	–	4	–	1
UCLA	4	–	3	–	0	6	–	5	–	0
California	4	–	3	–	0	6	–	5	–	0
No. 15 USC	3	–	4	–	0	6	–	4	–	1
Oregon State	3	–	4	–	0	6	–	5	–	0
Washington State	0	–	7	–	0	1	–	10	–	0
$ – Conference champion; Rankings from AP Poll

The 1970 Washington State Cougars football team was an American football team that represented Washington State University in the Pacific-8 Conference (Pac-8) during the 1970 NCAA University Division football season. In their third season under head coach Jim Sweeney, the Cougars compiled a 1–10 record (0–7 in Pac-8, last), and were outscored 460 to 231.

The team's statistical leaders included Ty Paine with 1,581 passing yards, Bob Ewen with 667 rushing yards, and Ed Armstrong with 488 receiving yards.

Due to the fire at Rogers Field in April, all home games were played at Joe Albi Stadium in Spokane in 1970 and 1971. AstroTurf was installed there in the summer of 1970.

For the second straight year, Washington State played a full conference schedule and went winless. The only victory was in September over neighbor Idaho in the Battle of the Palouse, the sole meeting in a three-year span. The annual rivalry game was not played the previous season (and in 1971) to allow the Cougars to schedule all seven conference opponents.

== Schedule ==
Date	Time	Opponent	Site	Result	Attendance	Source
September 12		at Kansas*	Memorial Stadium; Lawrence, KS	L 31–48	34,000	
September 19		Idaho*	Joe Albi Stadium; Spokane, WA (Battle of the Palouse)	W 44–16	27,200	
September 26		at Michigan State*	Spartan Stadium; East Lansing, MI	L 14–28	64,053	
October 3		at Oregon	Autzen Stadium; Eugene, OR	L 13–28	21,800	
October 10		at No. 14 Arizona State*	Sun Devil Stadium; Tempe, AZ	L 30–37	46,098	
October 17	1:32 p.m.	No. 9 Stanford	Joe Albi Stadium; Spokane, WA	L 16–63	30,400	
October 24	1:32 p.m.	at California	California Memorial Stadium; Berkeley, CA	L 0–45	26,000	
October 30		at No. 19 UCLA	Los Angeles Memorial Coliseum; Los Angeles, CA	L 9–54	30,029	
November 7		USC	Joe Albi Stadium; Spokane, WA	L 33–70	14,500	
November 14		Oregon State	Joe Albi Stadium; Spokane, WA	L 16–28	16,300	
November 21		Washington	Joe Albi Stadium; Spokane, WA (Apple Cup)	L 25–43	33,200	
*Non-conference game; Rankings from AP Poll released prior to the game; All times are in Pacific time

== Roster ==
1970 Washington State Cougars football team roster
Players
Coaches
Offense

Pos.	#	Name	Class
SE	42	Ed Armstrong	Sr
SE	45	Brock Aynsley	Jr
QB	15	Gary Bergan	Jr
OT	77	Buzz Brazeau	Jr
G	66	Steve Busch	Jr
FB	33	Bob Ewen	Sr
TE	89	Jim Forrest	So
G	67	Jim Giesa	Jr
C	50	John Hook	Jr
TB	26	Bernard Jackson	Jr
TB	27	Gary Kline	Sr
TE	86	Hugh Klopfenstein	Sr
FL	41	Tony Lomax	Jr
FB	32	Ken Lyday	Jr
C	53	Mike Lynch	Sr
G	61	Bill Moos	So
SE	43	Jim Oggs	Jr
QB	14	Ty Paine	So
OT	79	Mike Talbot	Jr
QB	13	Jack Wigmore	Sr
OT	76	Wallace Williams	Jr

Defense

Pos.	#	Name	Class
LB	63	Crosby Anerson	Jr
S	40	Nile DeCuire	Jr
CB	29	Tyrone Daisey	So
LB	69	Dana Dogterom	Jr
DT	75	Terry Durst	Sr
DT	74	Dennis Forston	Sr
CB	10	Chuck Hawthorne	Jr
LB	58	Randy Johnson	So
CB	23	Steve Kerby	Jr
DE	78	Brian Lange	Jr
R	38	Bob Leslie	Jr
LB	68	Pat Messinger	Sr
CB	25	Ron Butler	Jr
DE	88	Dennis Mitchell	So
DB	20	Mike Monahan	Jr
LB	57	Rod Mumma	Jr
DE	81	Mark Painter	Jr
DT	70	Marc Pence	So
LB	65	Joe Richer	Sr
DR	87	Mike Schmidlen	Jr
CB	22	Lionel Thomas	Sr
DB	48	Tim Thompson	So

Special teams

Pos.	#	Name	Class
P	20	Mike Monahan	Jr
K	3	Don Sweet	Jr

Head coach

- Jim Sweeney (3rd year)

Coordinators/assistant coaches

- Sam Jankovich (AHC, DC, LB)
- Pinky Erickson (freshmen)
- Jim Erkenbeck (OL)
- Jim Shanley (DB)
- Bob Simpson (WR)
- Walt Cubley (DL)
- Roosevelt Ellerbe (DE)

Legend

- (C) Team captain
- (S) Suspended
- (I) Ineligible
- Injured
- Redshirt

== All-conference ==
One Washington State offensive lineman, junior guard Steve Busch, was named to the All-Pac-8 team. On the second team (honorable mention) was senior cornerback Lionel Thomas. Busch made the first team again as a senior in 1971.
