= Boston Animal Care and Control =

Agency of the government of Boston

Animal Care and Control is an agency of the government of Boston. The Animal Care and Control Shelter, an open-admission facility, is located in Roslindale. This facility was previously a factory for eyeglasses. Its official capacity is 15 animals. As of 2024 it had held up to 25 animals.

== History ==
In June 2014 the Animal Rescue League of Boston issued a report stating that conditions were poor at the shelter. Mayor of Boston Martin J. Walsh responded by suspended the director and was preparing termination. 78 animals stayed in the shelter while 35 moved to other shelters.

In late July 2014 Walsh stated that the shelter had made significant improvements, and the Animal Rescue League of Boston stated that the organization now "had no problems" with the management of this shelter.

In 2020, Alexis Trzcinski became the head of the agency.
