= Marv Montgomery =

American football player (born 1948)

No. 78, 77, 71
- Position: Offensive tackle

Personal information
- Born: February 8, 1948 (age 78); Torrance, California, U.S.
- Listed height: 6 ft 6 in (1.98 m)
- Listed weight: 255 lb (116 kg)

Career information
- High school: Sylmar (Los Angeles, California)
- College: USC
- NFL draft: 1971: 1st round, 12th overall pick

Career history
- Denver Broncos (1971–1976); New Orleans Saints (1976–1977); Atlanta Falcons (1978)

Awards and highlights
- Second-team All-Pac-8 (1970)

Career NFL statistics
- Games played: 81
- Games started: 53
- Stats at Pro Football Reference

Marvin J. Montgomery (born February 8, 1948) is an American former professional football player who was an offensive tackle in the National Football League (NFL) for the Denver Broncos, New Orleans Saints, and the Atlanta Falcons. He was the first offensive lineman selected in the 1971 NFL draft at 12th in the first round by the Broncos. He played college football at the University of Southern California. He attended Sylmar High School.
