= Bob Pifferini =

American football player (born 1950)

No. 58, 54
- Position: Linebacker

Personal information
- Born: June 27, 1950 (age 76); San Jose, California, U.S.
- Listed height: 6 ft 2 in (1.88 m)
- Listed weight: 226 lb (103 kg)

Career information
- High school: Homestead
- College: UCLA
- NFL draft: 1972: 6th round, 133rd overall pick

Career history
- Chicago Bears (1972–1975); Los Angeles Rams (1977)

Awards and highlights
- Second-team All-Pac-8 (1970)

Career NFL statistics
- Games played: 57
- Games started: 0
- Fumble recoveries: 3
- Stats at Pro Football Reference

Robert Marico Pifferini, Jr. (born June 27, 1950) is an American former professional football player who was a linebacker for four seasons for the Chicago Bears, where he was a sixth-round draft pick, and one season for the Los Angeles Rams in the 1970s. He played college football at UCLA.

He is the son of Bob Pifferini, Sr.
