= Detroit Animal Care and Control =

Agency of the government of Detroit

Detroit Animal Care and Control (DACC), previously Detroit Animal Control, is an agency of the government of Detroit. It runs the municipal animal shelter.

It is currently under the General Services Department.

== History ==
For periods of time it was under the Detroit Health Department. In 2012 the city put the animal shelter under the authority of the Detroit Police Department. Mayor of Detroit Dave Bing initiated the move.

In October 2015 the shelter was moved back to the Health Department, at the time headed by Abdul El-Sayed. That month, a whistleblower lawsuit was filed by a person who worked as an animal control officer.

At one point the euthanasia rate declined to where the shelter could be considered "no kill" but this status ended by 2022. There had been plans to build a new animal shelter by 2022, but by then insufficient funds had been allocated in the budget.
