= Bo Cornell =

American football player (born 1949)

No. 33, 30
- Positions: Linebacker, running back

Personal information
- Born: March 7, 1949 (age 77); Seattle, Washington, U.S.
- Listed height: 6 ft 2 in (1.88 m)
- Listed weight: 220 lb (100 kg)

Career information
- High school: Roosevelt (Washington)
- College: Washington
- NFL draft: 1971: 2nd round, 40th overall pick

Career history
- Cleveland Browns (1971–1972); Buffalo Bills (1973–1977)

Awards and highlights
- 2× Second-team All-Pac-8 (1969, 1970)

Career NFL statistics
- Sacks: 4
- Fumble recoveries: 6
- Total TDs: 1
- Stats at Pro Football Reference

Robert Paul Cornell (born March 7, 1949) is an American former professional football player who was a linebacker and running back for seven seasons in the National Football League (NFL) with the Cleveland Browns and Buffalo Bills. He played collegiately for the Washington Huskies.
