= Jim Plunkett =

American football player (born 1947)

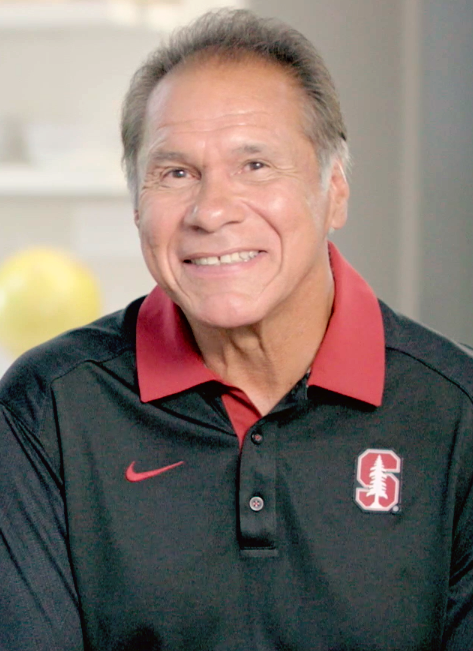
- Plunkett in 2018

No. 16
- Position: Quarterback

Personal information
- Born: December 5, 1947 (age 78); San Jose, California, U.S.
- Listed height: 6 ft 3 in (1.91 m)
- Listed weight: 220 lb (100 kg)

Career information
- High school: William C. Overfelt (San Jose) James Lick (San Jose)
- College: Stanford (1968–1970)
- NFL draft: 1971: 1st round, 1st overall pick

Career history
- New England Patriots (1971–1975); San Francisco 49ers (1976–1977); Oakland / Los Angeles Raiders (1978–1986)

Awards and highlights
- 2× Super Bowl champion (XV, XVIII); Super Bowl MVP (XV); NFL Comeback Player of the Year (1980); AFC Rookie of the Year (1971); Heisman Trophy (1970); Consensus All-American (1970); Second-team All-American (1969); 2× First-team All-Pac-8 (1969, 1970); Second-team All-Pac-8 (1968); Stanford Cardinal No. 16 retired; NFL record: Longest touchdown pass: 99 yards (tied)

Career NFL statistics
- Passing attempts: 3,701
- Passing completions: 1,943
- Completion percentage: 52.5%
- TD–INT: 164–198
- Passing yards: 25,882
- Passer rating: 67.5
- Rushing yards: 1,337
- Rushing touchdowns: 14
- Stats at Pro Football Reference
- College Football Hall of Fame

James William Plunkett (born December 5, 1947) is an American former professional football quarterback who played in the National Football League (NFL) for 16 seasons. He achieved his greatest success during his final eight seasons with the Raiders franchise, whom he led to two Super Bowl wins.

He played college football for the Stanford Indians, where he won the Heisman Trophy in 1970. He was selected first overall by the New England Patriots in the 1971 NFL draft. His tenure with the Patriots was productive, but after an injury-shortened 1975 season he was traded to the San Francisco 49ers, where he played in 1976 and 1977. Released from the 49ers after suffering further injuries, Plunkett signed with the Oakland Raiders in 1978.

Initially serving as a backup for the Raiders, Plunkett became the starting quarterback during the 1980 season and led them to win Super Bowl XV, where he was named MVP. In 1983, Plunkett again ascended from backup to starter to quarterback the relocated Los Angeles Raiders to victory in Super Bowl XVIII. He and Eli Manning are the only eligible quarterbacks with two Super Bowl wins as a starter not to be inducted into the Pro Football Hall of Fame. He was inducted into the College Football Hall of Fame in 1990.

== Early life ==
Plunkett was born to Mexican-American parents with an Irish-German grandfather on his paternal side. Plunkett's father was a news vendor afflicted with progressive blindness, who had to support his blind wife along with their three children. Plunkett's parents were both born in New Mexico; his mother, whose maiden name was Carmen Blea, was born in Santa Fe and his father, William Gutierrez Plunkett, was born in Albuquerque. Carmen was also of Native American ancestry. His father William died of a heart attack in 1969.

The Plunketts moved to California during World War II. William Plunkett first worked in the Richmond shipyards. By this time, Jim's two older sisters, Genevieve (16 years older than Jim) and Mary Ann (5 years older than Jim) had been born; Jim was born in 1947, after the family had moved to Santa Clara. They later moved to San Jose where William ran a newsstand, and where they were able to find low-cost housing. The family lived in relative poverty, and received state financial aid. Jim and his sisters learned to work hard and do things for themselves as they grew up. They also helped Carmen with cooking and other household chores.

When Jim was growing up, the family's financial situation was a big problem for him. He did not like the area he lived in, often did not have money for dates, and avoided bringing friends to his house. He worked from an early age, cleaning up at a gas station while in elementary school, delivering newspapers, bagging groceries, and working in orchards. In his high school years, he worked during the summer.

Jim went to William C. Overfelt High School in the 9th and 10th grades and then transferred to and graduated from James Lick High School, both located in east San Jose, California. Plunkett showed his talent for tossing the football by winning a throwing contest at the age of 14 with a heave of over 60 yards. Once he arrived at the school, he played quarterback and defensive end for the football team. He also competed in basketball, baseball, track, and wrestling – earning a CIF Wrestling State Championship at 194-pounds in 1966. Plunkett is on the Hall of Fame wall at James Lick High School.

== College career ==
Upon entering Stanford University, Plunkett endured a rough season on the freshman team after being weakened by a thyroid operation. His performance originally caused head coach John Ralston to switch him to defensive end, but Plunkett was adamant in remaining at quarterback, throwing 500 to 1,000 passes every day to polish his arm. He earned the opportunity to start in 1968; in the season opener, he completed ten of thirteen passes for 277 yards and four touchdowns, and never relinquished the starting spot. Plunkett ushered in an era of wide-open passing, pro-style offenses in the Pac-8, a trend that has continued to the present.

His successful junior campaign in 1969 saw him set league records for touchdown passes (20), passing yards (2,673), and total offense (2,786). This display of offensive firepower led Washington State head coach Jim Sweeney to call Plunkett "The best college football player I've ever seen." As a senior in 1970, he led Stanford to a conference championship and their first Rose Bowl appearance in nineteen years, a 27–17 upset of heavily-favored and undefeated Ohio State.

With eighteen passing and three rushing touchdowns added to his 2,715 passing yards on the year (which broke his own conference record), Plunkett won the 1970 Heisman Trophy over fellow quarterbacks Joe Theismann of Notre Dame and Archie Manning of Ole Miss. He was the first Latino to win the Heisman, captured the Maxwell Award for the nation's best player, and was named player of the year by United Press International, The Sporting News, and SPORT magazine. In addition, the American College Football Coaches Association designated him as their Offensive Player of the Year. He became the second multiple recipient (1969, 1970) of the W.J. Voit Memorial Trophy, awarded to the outstanding football player on the Pacific Coast.

While at Stanford, Plunkett was a member of Delta Tau Delta fraternity.

== Professional career ==
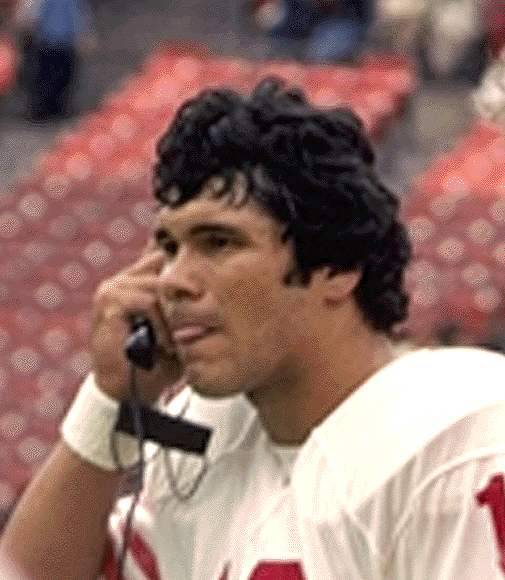
Plunkett with the 49ers in 1977

UCLA coach Tommy Prothro had called Plunkett the "best pro quarterback prospect I've ever seen", echoing Sweeney's words from the year prior. His excellent arm strength and precision made him attractive to pro teams that relied much more heavily on the passing game than most college teams of the late 1960s. In 1971, he was drafted with the first overall pick in the NFL draft by the New England Patriots (the team was still known as the Boston Patriots at the time of the draft; the name change to New England did not become official until March 21 of that year). Plunkett was the first player of Hispanic heritage to be drafted with the first overall pick in the NFL draft. The Patriots finished the season at 6–8 for fourth place in the AFC East. Plunkett's first game was a 20–6 victory over the Oakland Raiders, the Patriots' first regular-season contest at Schaefer Stadium. New England also influenced the AFC East championship race, as Plunkett's 88-yard fourth-quarter touchdown pass to former Stanford teammate Randy Vataha on the final day of the season dropped the Baltimore Colts to a 10–4–0 record and into second place in the division behind the 10–3–1 Miami Dolphins. Two weeks before the Patriots defeated the Colts, Plunkett engineered a 34–13 victory over the Dolphins.

Continuing to be effective, Plunkett finished second in the NFL in passing yards in 1973, and in 1974 led the Patriots to an impressive 6–1 start, and the team's first non losing season in eight years, finishing second in the NFL in team scoring with 348 points, seven behind league leader Oakland. But Plunkett suffered a left shoulder separation early in the 1975 season, giving rookie Steve Grogan, who would become a fixture with the club for 16 seasons, extensive experience, and under the leadership of coach Chuck Fairbanks, New England's offense became more run-oriented, led by Sam Cunningham.

Prior to the 1976 NFL draft, Plunkett was traded to the San Francisco 49ers in exchange for quarterback Tom Owen, two first-round picks in 1976, and a first and second-round pick in 1977. Plunkett led the 49ers to a 6–1 start before faltering to an 8–6 record. After a 5–9 season in 1977, the 49ers released him during the 1978 preseason.

Plunkett joined the Oakland Raiders in 1978, serving in a reserve capacity over the next two years, throwing no passes in 1978 and just fifteen in 1979. However, five weeks into the 1980 season, his career took a major turn when starting QB Dan Pastorini fractured his leg in a game against the Kansas City Chiefs. The 32-year-old Plunkett came off the bench to relieve Pastorini, throwing five interceptions in a 31–17 loss. The Raiders, however, believing that Marc Wilson did not have the experience they wanted, called on Plunkett to start for the remainder of the year. In his first game as a starter, he completed eleven of fourteen passes with a touchdown and no interceptions. Plunkett guided Oakland to nine victories in eleven games and a playoff berth as a wild card. Plunkett led the Raiders to four playoff victories, including the first-ever victory by a wild card team in the Super Bowl, defeating the Philadelphia Eagles 27–10 in Super Bowl XV. Throwing for 261 yards and three touchdowns, Plunkett was named the game's MVP; subsequently, Plunkett has the distinction of being the first minority to quarterback a team to a Super Bowl victory and the only Latino to be named Super Bowl MVP. In addition to this, he became the second of four players to win the Heisman Trophy and Super Bowl MVP, alongside Roger Staubach, Marcus Allen, and Desmond Howard.

Later in his career, the Raiders moved to Los Angeles. After being benched early in the 1983 season, Plunkett again assumed starting duties, this time after an injury to Marc Wilson. The Raiders advanced to Super Bowl XVIII, where they defeated the Washington Redskins, 38–9. Plunkett completed 16 of 25 passes for 172 yards and a touchdown in the game.

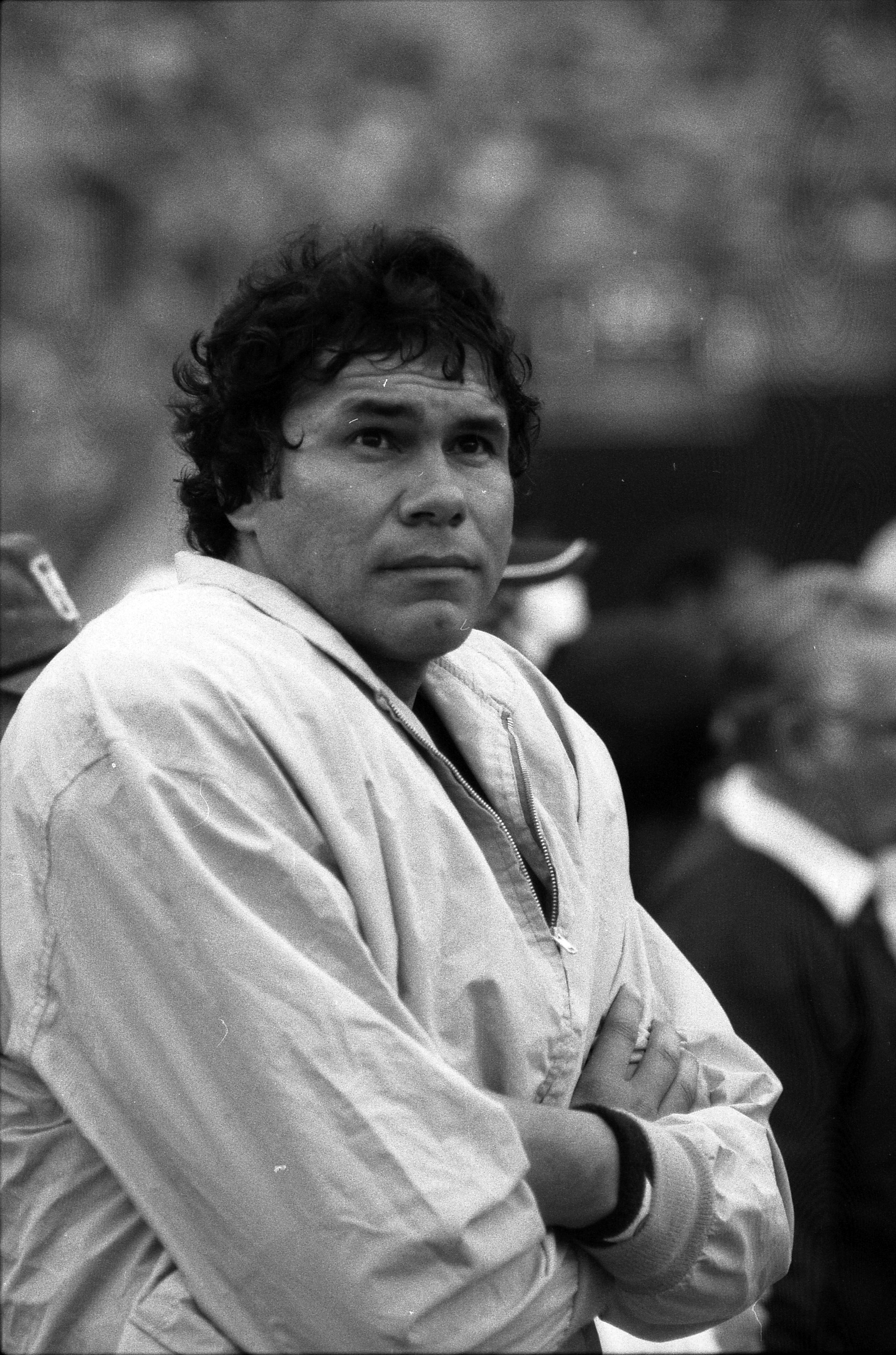
Plunkett with the Los Angeles Raiders in 1984

In 1984, Plunkett began the season as the Raiders' starter, but he suffered abdominal and hip injuries in Week 6 which made Wilson the starter for the rest of the season. The more experienced Plunkett was named the starter for the playoffs, but the Raiders lost to the Seattle Seahawks in the wild card game. In 1985, Plunkett was again injured, this time with a separated shoulder in Week 3. In 1986, he rotated with Wilson as the starter, and then missed the entire 1987 season following rotator cuff surgery. He retired during the 1988 pre-season as the fourth-leading passer in Raiders history. He holds the Raider record, and is tied for the league record, for the longest career pass, which occurred during a 99-yard pass play against the Washington Redskins on October 2, 1983. He retired as the only NFL quarterback to win two Super Bowls with the same franchise in different cities, winning his first while the Raiders were in Oakland and his second while they were in Los Angeles.

== NFL career statistics ==
Legend
	Super Bowl MVP
	Won the Super Bowl
	Led the league
**Bold**	Career high

=== Regular season ===
Year	Team	Games			Passing								
Year	Team	GP	GS	Record	Cmp	Att	Pct	Yds	Avg	TD	Int	Lng	Rtg
1971	NE	14	14	6–8	158	328	48.2	2,158	6.6	19	16	88	68.6
1972	NE	14	14	3–11	169	355	47.6	2,196	6.2	8	**25**	62	45.7
1973	NE	14	14	5–9	193	376	51.3	2,550	6.8	13	17	64	65.8
1974	NE	14	14	7–7	173	352	49.1	2,457	7.0	19	22	69	64.1
1975	NE	5	5	2–3	36	92	39.1	571	6.2	3	7	76	39.7
1976	SF	12	12	6–6	126	243	51.9	1,592	6.6	13	16	85	63.0
1977	SF	14	14	5–9	128	248	51.6	1,693	6.8	9	14	47	62.1
1979	OAK	4	0	—	7	15	46.7	89	5.9	1	1	39	60.1
1980	OAK	13	11	9–2	165	320	51.6	2,299	7.2	18	16	86	72.9
1981	OAK	9	7	2–5	94	179	52.5	1,045	5.8	4	9	42	56.7
1982	RAI	9	9	8–1	152	261	58.2	2,035	7.8	14	15	52	77.0
1983	RAI	14	13	**10–3**	**230**	**379**	60.7	**2,935**	7.7	**20**	18	**99**	82.7
1984	RAI	8	6	5–1	108	198	54.5	1,473	7.4	6	10	73	67.6
1985	RAI	3	3	1–2	71	103	**68.9**	803	7.8	3	3	41	**89.6**
1986	RAI	10	8	3–5	133	252	52.8	1,986	**7.9**	14	9	81	82.5
Career		157	144	72–72	1,943	3,701	52.5	25,882	7.0	164	198	99	67.5

=== Postseason ===
Year	Team	Games			Passing								
Year	Team	GP	GS	Record	Cmp	Att	Pct	Yds	Avg	TD	Int	Lng	Rtg
1980	OAK	4	4	**4–0**	49	**92**	53.3	**839**	9.1	**7**	3	**80**	**96.2**
1982	RAI	2	2	1–1	45	70	64.3	652	**9.3**	1	**5**	64	69.5
1983	RAI	3	3	3–0	54	83	**65.1**	618	7.4	2	2	50	85.3
1984	RAI	1	1	0–1	14	27	51.9	184	6.8	1	2	46	55.2
Career		10	10	8–2	162	272	59.6	2,293	8.4	11	12	80	81.9

=== Super Bowl ===
Year	SB	Team	Opp.	Passing								Rushing				Result
Year	SB	Team	Opp.	Cmp	Att	Pct	Yds	Y/A	TD	Int	Rtg	Att	Yds	Y/A	TD	Result
1980	XV	OAK	PHI	12	21	57.1	**261**	**12.4**	**3**	0	**145.0**	**3**	**9**	**3.0**	0	**W** 27–10
1984	XVIII	RAI	WAS	**16**	**25**	**64.0**	172	6.9	1	0	97.4	1	-2	-2.0	0	**W** 38–9
Career				29	46	63.0	433	9.4	4	0	122.8	4	7	1.8	0	W−L 2–0

== Awards and honors ==
NFL

- 2× Super Bowl champion (XV, XVIII)
- Super Bowl MVP (XV)
- NFL Comeback Player of the Year (1980)
- AFC Rookie of the Year (1971)

College

- 1971 Rose Bowl MVP
- Heisman Trophy (1970)
- Maxwell Award (1970)
- Walter Camp Award (1970)
- SN Player of the Year (1970)
- UPI Player of the Year (1970)
- Chic Harley Award (1970)
- Consensus All-American (1970)
- Second-team All-American (1969)
- Pop Warner Trophy (1970)
- 2× First-team All-Pac-8 (1969, 1970)
- Second-team All-Pac-8 (1968)
- Stanford Cardinal No. 16 retired

Halls of Fame

- College Football Hall of Fame
- Rose Bowl Hall of Fame (1989)
- California Sports Hall of Fame
- Bay Area Sports Hall of Fame
- National High School Hall of Fame (2007)

== See also ==
- List of NCAA major college football yearly passing leaders
- List of NCAA major college football yearly total offense leaders
