= Terry Mendenhall =

American football player (born 1949)

No. 54
- Position: Linebacker

Personal information
- Born: April 16, 1949 (age 77); Los Angeles, California
- Listed height: 6 ft 1 in (1.85 m)
- Listed weight: 210 lb (95 kg)

Career information
- High school: Redondo Beach (CA) Aviation
- College: San Diego State

Career history
- Oakland Raiders (1971–1972)
- Stats at Pro Football Reference

Terry Tim Mendenhall (born April 16, 1949) is an American former football linebacker. He played for the Oakland Raiders from 1971 to 1972.
