= Scott Stringer (American football) =

American football player (born 1951)

No. 28
- Position: Defensive back

Personal information
- Born: August 5, 1951 (age 75); Tracy, California, U.S.
- Listed height: 5 ft 11 in (1.80 m)
- Listed weight: 180 lb (82 kg)

Career information
- High school: Joint Union
- College: California
- NFL draft: 1973: undrafted

Career history
- St. Louis Cardinals (1974)
- Stats at Pro Football Reference

Scott Lee Stringer (born August 5, 1951) is an American former professional football player who was a defensive back for the St. Louis Cardinals of the National Football League (NFL). He played college football for the California Golden Bears.
