= Tom Graham (linebacker) =

American football player (1950–2017)

No. 83, 58, 56, 55
- Position: Linebacker

Personal information
- Born: April 15, 1950; Los Angeles, California, U.S.
- Died: May 30, 2017 (aged 67); Denver, Colorado, U.S.
- Listed height: 6 ft 2 in (1.88 m)
- Listed weight: 235 lb (107 kg)

Career information
- High school: Narbonne (Harbor City, California)
- College: Oregon
- NFL draft: 1972: 4th round, 102nd overall pick

Career history
- Denver Broncos (1972–1974); Kansas City Chiefs (1974); San Diego Chargers (1975–1977); Buffalo Bills (1978)

Awards and highlights
- 2× First-team All-Pac-8 (1969, 1970)

Career NFL statistics
- Games played: 88
- Interceptions: 7
- Fumble recoveries: 4
- Stats at Pro Football Reference

Thomas Lawrence Graham (April 15, 1950 – May 30, 2017) was an American professional football linebacker in the National Football League (NFL). From 1972 until 1978, he played for the Denver Broncos, Kansas City Chiefs, San Diego Chargers, and Buffalo Bills. He played college football at the University of Oregon. From 1969 to 1971, linebacker Tom Graham starred for a University of Oregon defensive unit that was often overshadowed by the team's offensive stars and fellow Hall of Famers Dan Fouts and Bobby Moore (now known as Ahmad Rashad). From 1969 to 1971 he became the all-time leading tackler in Duck football history and was a 2001 inductee into the University of Oregon Hall of Fame. By the end of his Duck career, Graham had amassed a school-record 433 tackles, including an amazing 206 as a sophomore (as season that saw Graham record five 20-plus tackle games). He saved his best game for last, putting together one of the finest performances in Duck history, as he made 41 tackles (24 unassisted), recovered a fumble, and blocked a field goal.

A Harbor City, Calif. native, where he attended Narbonne High School, Graham was named All-Pac-8, UPI All-Coast, and All-American three times, and AP All-coast and All-American twice. After being drafted in the fourth round by the Denver Broncos, he played 7 seasons in the NFL for the Broncos, Kansas City Chiefs, San Diego Chargers, and Buffalo Bills.

Tom is the father of former professional football player Daniel Graham. He died on May 30, 2017, in Denver from brain cancer at the age of 67.
