= 1970 UCLA Bruins football team =

American college football season

1970 UCLA Bruins football
- Conference: Pacific-8 Conference
- Record: 6–5 (4–3 Pac-8)
- Head coach: Tommy Prothro (6th season)
- Home stadium: Los Angeles Memorial Coliseum

1970 Pacific-8 Conference football standings
	Conf.					Overall
Team	W		L		T	W		L		T
No. 8 Stanford $	6	–	1	–	0	9	–	3	–	0
Washington	4	–	3	–	0	6	–	4	–	0
Oregon	4	–	3	–	0	6	–	4	–	1
UCLA	4	–	3	–	0	6	–	5	–	0
California	4	–	3	–	0	6	–	5	–	0
No. 15 USC	3	–	4	–	0	6	–	4	–	1
Oregon State	3	–	4	–	0	6	–	5	–	0
Washington State	0	–	7	–	0	1	–	10	–	0
$ – Conference champion; Rankings from AP Poll

The 1970 UCLA Bruins football team was an American football team that represented the University of California, Los Angeles during the 1970 NCAA University Division football season. In their sixth and final year under head coach Tommy Prothro, the Bruins compiled a 6–5 record (4–3 Pac-8) and finished in a four-way tie for second place in the Pacific-8 Conference.

UCLA's offensive leaders in 1970 were quarterback Dennis Dummit with 2,392 passing yards, running back Marv Kendricks with 573 rushing yards, and wide receiver Rick Wilkes with 595 receiving yards.

In his final season at UCLA, Prothro's team suffered a rash of key injuries and finished 6–5, yet they were three close games from a 9–2 season and Rose Bowl berth. Before those injuries set in, UCLA took a 3–0 record into Austin to play defending national champ and top ranked Texas. Trailing 13–3 at the half, UCLA rallied and had a 17–13 lead in the final minute. But with 12 seconds left, Texas completed a long pass when their receiver caught the ball between two UCLA defenders, who then collided, allowing the receiver to score.

UCLA also blew a 20-point fourth quarter lead against Oregon, when Ducks sophomore quarterback Dan Fouts rallied his team to three touchdowns and a 41–40 win.

Finally, there came the showdown with Stanford; the game was expected to be a shootout between UCLA quarterback Dennis Dummit and Heisman winner Jim Plunkett. But the defenses ruled as UCLA took a 7–6 lead into the 4th quarter. Stanford took a 9–7 lead on a field goal, but UCLA was driving to a potential game-winning field goal or touchdown themselves when they completed a pass inside the Stanford 10-yard-line, only to have the receiver get sandwiched by two defenders on the tackle and fumble. This game ultimately decided the Pac-8 championship and 1971 Rose Bowl representative.

The season ended on a high note when UCLA beat rival USC, 45–20, in a game that was not that close. This would end up being Prothro's final game at UCLA.

Prothro was frustrated by bizarre officiating at critical moments, numerous last minute narrow losses, and losing out of the Rose Bowl by the conference vote in 1966. Prothro also decried the Pac-8 rule that only allowed the conference champion to go to a bowl game; he witnessed many lower ranked inferior teams (often ones he defeated during the season) go to bowl games while his Bruins stayed home. After George Allen was fired by the Los Angeles Rams, Prothro accepted that job.

== Schedule ==
Date	Time	Opponent	Rank	Site	Result	Attendance	Source
September 12		at Oregon State	No. 18	Parker Stadium; Corvallis, OR	W 14–9	23,520	
September 19		at Pittsburgh*	No. 16	Pitt Stadium; Pittsburgh, PA	W 24–15	33,889	
September 26		Northwestern*	No. 15	Los Angeles Memorial Coliseum; Los Angeles, CA	W 12–7	36,803	
October 3		at No. 2 Texas*	No. 13	Texas Memorial Stadium; Austin, TX	L 17–20	65,500	
October 10		Oregon	No. 15	Los Angeles Memorial Coliseum; Los Angeles, CA	L 40–41	44,722	
October 17	1:31 p.m.	at California	No. 19	California Memorial Stadium; Berkeley, CA (rivalry)	W 24–21	43,000	
October 24	8:00 p.m.	No. 8 Stanford	No. 16	Los Angeles Memorial Coliseum; Los Angeles, CA	L 7–9	83,518	
October 30		Washington State	No. 19	Los Angeles Memorial Coliseum; Los Angeles, CA	W 54–9	30,029	
November 14		at Washington	No. 17	University of Washington Stadium; Seattle, WA	L 20–61	59,250	
November 21		USC		Los Angeles Memorial Coliseum; Los Angeles, CA (Victory Bell)	W 45–20	78,773	
December 5		at No. 5 Tennessee*		Neyland Stadium; Knoxville, TN	L 17–28	63,242	
*Non-conference game; Rankings from AP Poll released prior to the game; All times are in Pacific time

== Roster ==
1970 UCLA Bruins football team roster
Players
Coaches
Offense

Pos.	#	Name	Class
TE	88	Bob Christiansen	Jr
C	50	Dave Dalby	Jr
QB	19	Dennis Dummit	Sr
G	65	Brian Goodman	So
OT	74	Bruce Walton	So

Defense

Pos.	#	Name	Class
DB	29	Alan Ellis	So
DT	73	Ed Galigher	Jr
DB	21	Reynaud Moore	Jr
LB	58	Bob Pifferini	Jr

Special teams

Pos.	#	Name	Class
P	44	Bruce Barnes	So

Head coach

- Tommy Prothro

Coordinators/assistant coaches

Legend

- (C) Team captain
- (S) Suspended
- (I) Ineligible
- Injured
- Redshirt
