= Ernie Janet =

American football player (born 1949)

No. 59, 64, 63
- Position: Guard

Personal information
- Born: July 22, 1949 (age 77); Renton, Washington, U.S.
- Listed height: 6 ft 4 in (1.93 m)
- Listed weight: 250 lb (113 kg)

Career information
- High school: Burien (WA) Glacier
- College: Washington (1967–1970)
- NFL draft: 1971: 2nd round, 37th overall pick

Career history
- San Francisco 49ers (1971); Chicago Bears (1972–1974); Green Bay Packers (1975); Philadelphia Eagles (1975); Washington Redskins (1976)*
- * Offseason or practice squad member only

Awards and highlights
- First-team All-Pac-8 (1970); Second-team All-Pac-8 (1969)
- Stats at Pro Football Reference

Ernest Jay Janet (born July 22, 1949) is an American former professional football player. A guard, he played college football for the Washington Huskies and was a two-team All-Pacific-8 Conference selection. He was selected by the San Francisco 49ers in the second round of the 1971 National Football League (NFL) draft but missed his rookie season due to injury. He then played for the Chicago Bears from 1972 to 1974 before splitting the 1975 season with the Green Bay Packers and Philadelphia Eagles. He was also a member of the Washington Redskins.

== Early life ==
Janet was born on July 22, 1949, in Renton, Washington. He attended Glacier High School in Seattle where he competed in football and track and field. He was a center in football and competed in the shot put in track and field. As a senior in 1966, Janet was selected second-team all-state at center. While he was in high school, his brother, Dave, a lineman at Washington State University, was killed in a car crash while driving from school. Due to this, Janet decided to enroll at the University of Washington to play college football.

== College career ==
Janet attended Washington from 1967 to 1970, spending the 1967 season on the freshman team before lettering with the Washington Huskies for three years. He started his collegiate career as a tight end. He later moved to the offensive line and played as a tackle, guard and center. He was named second-team All-Pacific-8 Conference for the 1969 season. Janet was a top guard for Washington in 1970 and helped them compile a record of 6–4 while being named first-team all-conference. At the conclusion of his collegiate career, he was named to the East–West Shrine Bowl. He also participated in the Chicago Charities College All-Star Game against the defending NFL champion Baltimore Colts.

== Professional career ==
Janet was selected by the San Francisco 49ers in the second round (37th overall) of the 1971 NFL draft, in what was described as a "surprise pick". However, he had injured his hamstring during one college all-star game and then the injury worsened in the next, resulting in him being unable to play for the 49ers in the 1971 season. He was traded to the Chicago Bears on September 7, 1972, prior to the 1972 season. A backup guard, he made his NFL debut in Week 12 of the 1972 season and finished the season with three games played, while the Bears compiled a record of 4–9–1.

Janet returned to the Bears in 1973 and appeared in 12 games, two as a starter. That season, against the Minnesota Vikings, he was forced to block against future Pro Football Hall of Famer Alan Page due to an injury to the starting guard, Glen Holloway, and Bears line coach Whitey Dovell said afterwards that Janet did "a respectable job". He was selected in the 1974 WFL pro draft by the Memphis Southmen, though he stayed with the Bears. He was the Bears' starting left guard during the 1974 season, starting all 14 games as the team compiled a record of 4–10. Janet was released on September 3, 1975, prior to the 1975 season.

Janet signed with the Green Bay Packers on September 10, 1975. He appeared in one game as a backup before being released on October 15. On December 10, he signed with the Philadelphia Eagles, only to be released after appearing in one game. In May 1976, he signed with the Washington Redskins, later being placed on injured reserve in August. He did not return to Washington in 1977, ending his professional career with 31 games played, 16 as a starter.
