= 1970 Oregon Ducks football team =

American college football season

1970 Oregon Ducks football
- Conference: Pacific-8 Conference
- Record: 6–4–1 (4–3 Pac-8)
- Head coach: Jerry Frei (4th season)
- Captains: Tom Blanchard; Lionel Coleman; Bob Newland
- Home stadium: Autzen Stadium

1970 Pacific-8 Conference football standings
	Conf.					Overall
Team	W		L		T	W		L		T
No. 8 Stanford $	6	–	1	–	0	9	–	3	–	0
Washington	4	–	3	–	0	6	–	4	–	0
Oregon	4	–	3	–	0	6	–	4	–	1
UCLA	4	–	3	–	0	6	–	5	–	0
California	4	–	3	–	0	6	–	5	–	0
No. 15 USC	3	–	4	–	0	6	–	4	–	1
Oregon State	3	–	4	–	0	6	–	5	–	0
Washington State	0	–	7	–	0	1	–	10	–	0
$ – Conference champion; Rankings from AP Poll

The 1970 Oregon Ducks football team represented the University of Oregon during the 1970 NCAA University Division football season. Five home games were played in Eugene at Autzen Stadium, with one at Civic Stadium in Portland.

Led by fourth-year head coach Jerry Frei, the Ducks were 6–4–1 overall and 4–3 in the Pacific-8 Conference, tied for second. The opener was played in Portland, the Ducks' first game there in four years; the last was in 1966, prior to the opening of Autzen. After upsetting both UCLA and USC, Oregon was 5–2 and ranked #16 in the AP Poll, but won just one of their last four games.

In the second game of the season at Illinois, senior quarterback (and punter) Tom Blanchard injured a troublesome knee and was relieved by sophomore Dan Fouts, who became the starter. Blanchard returned the next week against third-ranked Stanford, but only as the punter.

The Ducks lost the season-ending Civil War game to Oregon State for a seventh consecutive year.

The marching band was not funded this year; in its place was the student rock band Ouroboros, paid $210 per game.

== Schedule ==
Date	Time	Opponent	Rank	Site	Result	Attendance	Source
September 12	8:01 pm	California		Civic Stadium; Portland, OR	W 31–24	26,566	
September 19	11:30 am	at Illinois*		Memorial Stadium; Champaign, IL	L 16–20	33,246	
September 26	1:30 pm	No. 3 Stanford		Autzen Stadium; Eugene, OR	L 10–33	38,400	
October 3	1:30 pm	Washington State		Autzen Stadium; Eugene, OR	W 28–13	21,800	
October 10	8:00 pm	at No. 15 UCLA		Los Angeles Memorial Coliseum; Los Angeles, CA	W 41–40	44,722	
October 17	1:30 pm	Idaho*		Autzen Stadium; Eugene, OR	W 49–13	21,300	
October 24	1:30 pm	No. 10 USC		Autzen Stadium; Eugene, OR	W 10–7	34,000	
October 31	1:30 pm	at Washington	No. 16	Husky Stadium; Seattle, WA (rivalry)	L 23–25	58,580	
November 7	1:30 pm	No. 9 Air Force*		Autzen Stadium; Eugene, OR	W 46–35	24,700	
November 14	11:02 am	at Army*	No. 19	Michie Stadium; West Point, NY	T 22–22	39,455	
November 21	1:30 pm	at Oregon State		Parker Stadium; Corvallis, OR (Civil War)	L 9–24	40,299	
*Non-conference game; Rankings from AP Poll released prior to the game

== Roster ==
1970 Oregon Ducks football team roster
Players
Coaches
Offense

Pos.	#	Name	Class
FB	41	Jim Anderson	So
FB	42	Thurman Anderson	Jr
G	63	Mark Andrews	Sr
QB	17	Tom Blanchard	Sr
OT	74	Tom Drougas	Jr
C	54	Jim Figoni	Jr
QB	11	Dan Fouts	So
WR	48	Leland Glass	Jr
TE, FB	40	Greg Marshall	Sr
OL	60	John McKean	Jr
RB	23	Bobby Moore	Jr
WR	81	Bob Newland	Sr
TE	87	Greg Specht	So
G	65	Jack Stambaugh	Sr
G	70	Tim Stokes	So

Defense

Pos.	#	Name	Class
S	30	Bill Brauner	Sr
DE	95	Steve Buettner	Jr
CB	32	Lionel Coleman	Sr
CB	38	Bill Drake	Jr
LB	52	Tom Graham	Jr
S	46	Bob Green	Jr
DT	76	Mike Johnson	Sr
LB	93	Delton Lewis	Jr
DB	37	Fred Manuel	So
LB	56	Mike McConnel	Jr
DE	37	Ray Reeves	So
LB	90	Steve Rennie	Jr
DT	66	Dave Walker	Sr

Special teams

Pos.	#	Name	Class
P	17	Tom Blanchard	Sr
P	11	Dan Fouts	So
P		Steve Bailey	Jr
PK	28	Ken Woody	Sr

Head coach

- Jerry Frei (4th year)

Coordinators/assistant coaches

- John Robinson
- Bruce Snyder
- Dick Enright (OL)
- Norm Chapman
- Ron Stratten (DL)
- George Seifert (DB)
- John Marshall

Legend

- (C) Team captain
- (S) Suspended
- (I) Ineligible
- Injured
- Redshirt

== All-conference ==
Four Oregon players were named to the All-Pacific-8 team: junior halfback Bobby Moore (later Ahmad Rashad), senior split end Bob Newland, junior linebacker Tom Graham, and senior cornerback Lionel Coleman. On the second team (honorable mention) were senior guard Jack Stambaugh and junior cornerback Bill Drake. Moore also made the first team as a sophomore in 1969 and as a senior in 1971.
