= Chicago Animal Care and Control =

Chicago Animal Care and Control (CACC) is a department of the city of Chicago. It operates the municipal animal shelter, David R. Lee Animal Care Center, located in the Lower West Side. It is an open-admission shelter.

In 2016 it had 62 employees.

== History ==
The department was created in 1973. The current building opened in 1980.

In 2013 the city Office of the Inspector General audited the shelter and stated that it did not have enough people employed to have adequate operations, and it did not perform veterinary examinations that should have been taken.

In 2016, Fran Spielman of the Chicago Sun Times wrote that the agency, which had chronic leadership change, was "chronically-troubled". That year, after several dogs died in the shelter's care, Don Levin, the chairperson of the board of the Chicago Wolves and a donor to the department, asked for a "culture change".

In 2016 Susan Russell became the executive director. Mayor of Chicago Rahm Emanuel dismissed her from her position in 2018.

Kelley Gandurski became the acting executive director in 2018.

In 2019 the facility's medical unit was renovated. The cost was $1,500,000.

As of 2026 Susan Cappello is the acting director.
