= Bob Moore (American football) =

American football player (born 1949)

No. 88, 86, 87
- Position: Tight end

Personal information
- Born: February 12, 1949 (age 77); Baltimore, Maryland, U.S.
- Listed height: 6 ft 3 in (1.91 m)
- Listed weight: 220 lb (100 kg)

Career information
- High school: Klamath Union (Klamath Falls, Oregon)
- College: Stanford
- NFL draft: 1971: 5th round, 123rd overall pick

Career history
- Oakland Raiders (1971–1975); Tampa Bay Buccaneers (1976–1977); Denver Broncos (1978)

Awards and highlights
- Second-team All-American (1970); Third-team All-American (1969); 2× First-team All-Pac-8 (1969, 1970)

Career NFL statistics
- Receptions: 114
- Receiving yards: 1,262
- Receiving TDs: 7
- Stats at Pro Football Reference

Robert Moore (born February 12, 1949) is an American former professional football player who was a tight end for eight seasons in the National Football League (NFL). He played college football for Stanford Cardinal.
