= 1970 USC Trojans football team =

American college football season

1970 USC Trojans football
- Conference: Pacific-8 Conference

Ranking
- Coaches: No. 19
- AP: No. 15
- Record: 6–4–1 (3–4 Pac-8)
- Head coach: John McKay (11th season)
- Captains: Bob Chandler; Charlie Weaver
- Home stadium: Los Angeles Memorial Coliseum

1970 Pacific-8 Conference football standings
	Conf.					Overall
Team	W		L		T	W		L		T
No. 8 Stanford $	6	–	1	–	0	9	–	3	–	0
Washington	4	–	3	–	0	6	–	4	–	0
Oregon	4	–	3	–	0	6	–	4	–	1
UCLA	4	–	3	–	0	6	–	5	–	0
California	4	–	3	–	0	6	–	5	–	0
No. 15 USC	3	–	4	–	0	6	–	4	–	1
Oregon State	3	–	4	–	0	6	–	5	–	0
Washington State	0	–	7	–	0	1	–	10	–	0
$ – Conference champion; Rankings from AP Poll

The 1970 USC Trojans football team represented the University of Southern California (USC) in the 1970 NCAA University Division football season. In their 11th year under head coach John McKay, the Trojans compiled a 6–4–1 record (3–4 against conference opponents), finished in a tie for sixth place in the Pacific-8 Conference (Pac-8), and outscored their opponents by a combined total of 343 to 233. The team was ranked #15 in the final AP Poll and #19 in the final Coaches Poll.

On September 12, 1970, USC opened the season visiting the University of Alabama under coach Bear Bryant and became the first fully integrated team to play in the State of Alabama. The game, scheduled by Bryant, resulted in a 42–21 win for the Trojans. More importantly, all six touchdowns scored by USC team were by African-American players, two by USC running back Sam "Bam" Cunningham, against an all-white Crimson Tide team. The game hastened the racial integration of football at Alabama and in the American South.

Jimmy Jones led the team in passing, completing 121 of 234 passes for 1,877 yards with 10 touchdowns and 5 interceptions. Clarence Davis led the team in rushing with 214 carries for 972 yards and nine touchdowns. Bob Chandler led the team in receiving with 41 catches for 590 yards and three touchdowns.

== Schedule ==
Date	Time	Opponent	Rank	Site	Result	Attendance	Source
September 12		vs. No. 16 Alabama*	No. 3	Legion Field; Birmingham, AL	W 42–21	72,175	
September 19		No. 9 Nebraska*	No. 3	Los Angeles Memorial Coliseum; Los Angeles, CA	T 21–21	73,768	
September 26		at Iowa*	No. 7	Iowa Stadium; Iowa City, IA	W 48–0	56,131	
October 3		Oregon State	No. 5	Los Angeles Memorial Coliseum; Los Angeles, CA	W 45–13	57,769	
October 10		at No. 12 Stanford	No. 4	Stanford Stadium; Stanford, CA (rivalry)	L 14–24	86,000	
October 17		Washington	No. 11	Los Angeles Memorial Coliseum; Los Angeles, CA	W 28–25	56,166	
October 24		at Oregon	No. 10	Autzen Stadium; Eugene, OR	L 7–10	34,000	
October 31	1:23 p.m.	California^{†}	No. 18	Los Angeles Memorial Coliseum; Los Angeles, CA	L 10–13	54,750	
November 7		at Washington State		Joe Albi Stadium; Spokane, WA	W 70–33	14,500	
November 21		at UCLA		Los Angeles Memorial Coliseum; Los Angeles, CA (Victory Bell)	L 20–45	78,773	
November 28		No. 4 Notre Dame*		Los Angeles Memorial Coliseum; Los Angeles, CA (rivalry)	W 38–28	64,694	
*Non-conference game; ^{†}Homecoming; Rankings from AP Poll released prior to the game; All times are in Pacific time

== Game summaries ==
=== Alabama ===
Team	1	2	3	4	Total
• USC	12	10	10	10	42
Alabama	0	7	6	8	21

- Date: September 12
- Location: Legion Field, Birmingham, Alabama

Scoring summary
1	USC	Cunningham 22-yard run (kick failed)	USC 6-0
1	USC	Cunningham 4-yard run (pass failed)	USC 12-0
2	USC	Ayala 32-yard field goal	USC 15-0
2	ALA	Musso 1-yard run (Clemny kick)	USC 15-7
2	USC	Evans 7-yard run (Ayala kick)	USC 22-7
3	USC	Davis 23-yard pass from Jones (Ayala kick)	USC 29-7
3	USC	Ayala 25-yard field goal	USC 32-7
3	ALA	Bailey 6-yard pass from Hayden (kick failed)	USC 32-13
4	USC	Ayala 27-yard field goal	USC 35-13
4	USC	Holland 6-yard pass from Rae (Ayala kick)	USC 42-13
4	ALA	Musso 1-yard run (Hunter to Ceav pass)	USC 42-21

=== Iowa ===
Team	1	2	3	4	Total
• USC	7	27	14	0	48
Iowa	0	0	0	0	0

- Date: September 26
- Location: Iowa Stadium, Iowa City, Iowa
- Game attendance: 56,131

Scoring summary
1	USC	Jones 1-yard run (Ayala kick)	USC 7-0
2	USC	Davis 3-yard run (Ayala kick)	USC 14-0
2	USC	Jones 8-yard run (kick failed)	USC 20-0
2	USC	Chandler 9-yard pass from Jones (Dickerson pass from Jones)	USC 28-0
2	USC	Rae 4-yard run (run failed)	USC 34-0
3	USC	Harris 1-yard run (Ayala kick)	USC 41-0
3	USC	McNeill 4-yard run (Ayala kick)	USC 48-0

=== Oregon State ===
Jimmy Jones 15/21, 304 Yds, 3 TD, rush TD

=== Notre Dame ===
Team	1	2	3	4	Total
Notre Dame	7	7	7	7	28
• USC	21	3	14	0	38

- Date: November 28
- Location: Los Angeles Memorial Coliseum, Los Angeles
- Game attendance: 64,694
- TV announcers (ABC): Chris Schenkel, Bud Wilkinson

Scoring summary
1	ND	Theismann 25-yard run (Hempel kick)	ND 7-0
1	USC	Davis 3-yard run (Ayala kick)	Tied 7-7
1	USC	Davis 5-yard run (kick failed)	USC 13-7
1	USC	Dickerson 45-yard pass from Jones (Jones to Chandler pass)	USC 21-7
2	ND	Cieszkowski 9-yard pass from Theismann (Hempel kick)	USC 21-14
2	USC	Ayala 19-yard field goal	USC 24-14
3	USC	Adams recovered fumble in end zone (Ayala kick)	USC 31-14
3	USC	Vella recovered fumble in end zone (Ayala kick)	USC 38-14
3	ND	Parker 46-yard pass from Theismann (Hempel kick)	USC 38-21
4	ND	Theismann 1-yard run (Hempel kick)	USC 38-28

== Personnel ==
1970 USC Trojans football team roster
Players
Coaches
Offense

Pos.	#	Name	Class
OT	77	Pete Adams	So
RB		Mike Berry
C	57	Dave Brown	So
WR	10	Bob Chandler (C)	Sr
RB	39	Sam Cunningham	So
RB	28	Clarence Davis	Sr
WR	18	Sam Dickerson	Sr
RB	33	Charlie Evans	Sr
G	61	Allan Graf	So
RB		Lou Harris
RB		Bill Holland
QB	8	Jimmy Jones	Jr
RB	27	Rod McNeill	So
OT	78	Marv Montgomery	Sr
WR	22	Mike Morgan	Jr
TE	86	Gerry Mullins	Sr
QB	6	Mike Rae	So
G	68	Mike Ryan	So
TE	81	Chris Vella	So
OT	75	John Vella	Jr
G	60	Wayne Yary	Sr
TE	89	Charle Young	Jr

Defense

Pos.	#	Name	Class
DL	87	Ken Carter	Jr
DB	21	Bruce Dyer	Jr
DB		Walt Failor
DE	94	John Grant	So
DL		John Grissum
DE	83	Willie Hall	Sr
LB	50	Mike Haluchak	Sr
DB		Tyrone Hudson
LB	67	John Papadakis	Jr
LB		Ron Preston
DL		John Skiles
LB		Greg Slough
DT	93	Tody Smith	Sr
DB	46	Skip Thomas	Jr
DB		Curt Timmons
DL	84	Charlie Weaver (C)	Sr

Special teams

Pos.	#	Name	Class
K		Ron Ayala

Head coach

- John McKay

Coordinators/assistant coaches

- Willie Brown – Assistant
- Dave Levy – Assistant
- Marv Goux – Assistant
- Craig Fertig – Assistant
- Phil Krueger – Assistant
- Rod Humenuik – Assistant
- Joe Gibbs – Assistant
- Pete Yoder – Running backs

Legend

- (C) Team captain
- (S) Suspended
- (I) Ineligible
- Injured
- Redshirt

== 1970 team players in the NFL ==
The following players were claimed in the 1971 NFL draft.

Player	Position	Round	Pick	NFL club
Marv Montgomery	Tackle	1	12	Denver Broncos
Tody Smith	Defensive tackle	1	25	Dallas Cowboys
Charles Weaver	Defensive end	2	48	Detroit Lions
Sam Dickerson	Wide receiver	3	55	San Francisco 49ers
Gerry Mullins	Tight end	4	86	Pittsburgh Steelers
Clarence Davis	Running back	4	97	Oakland Raiders
Greg Slough	Linebacker	6	149	Oakland Raiders
Herman Franklin	Wide receiver	6	152	Detroit Lions
Bob Chandler	Wide receiver	7	160	Buffalo Bills
Charles Evans	Running back	14	356	New York Giants
