= 607th Air Intelligence Squadron =

The 607th Air Intelligence Squadron is located at Osan Air Base, home of the 51st Fighter Wing, roughly 40 miles (64 km) south of Seoul, the capital of the Republic of Korea. The squadron comprises six flights of approximately 180 officer and enlisted personnel. United States military personnel serve in the Republic of Korea (ROK), shoulder to shoulder with the ROK military, in order to ensure the continuation of the country's democratic government.

== Location ==
Songtan grew up around Osan Air Base and was originally just four tiny farming villages. When Osan Air Base was established in 1952, the closest town of any size was Osan-eub, from which Osan Air Base got its name. Songtan officially became a city on 1 July 1981 and has since grown to a population of 110,000. As of 10 May 1995, Songtan merged with the nearby larger city of Pyeongtaek and became part of a metropolis of 310,000 people covering an area of 87,168 acres (352.76 km^{2}). The Songtan-Pyeongtaek area has become a major industrial site and is home to many factories. The merger has seen the development of Pyeongtaek as a major port city, with access to a West Coast highway linking Incheon to Mokpo. A deep water harbor has recently been completed at Pyeongtaek. The city is rapidly becoming a major port and industrial complex on the West Coast of South Korea. References to Songtan are being changed over to Pyeongtaek, but many people (and some official signs) still use Songtan and Songtan City, and a Songtan exit was recently added on the Seoul-Busan Expressway. For the time being, any reference to Songtan is to the area just outside the main gate of Osan Air Base.

=== Surrounding area ===
Songtan has many shops and outdoor stands that offer goods at a much lower price than in the States. In the past you could barter and get a cheaper price on almost anything but now most store owners have a set price. Some will come down a small amount.

== History ==
The squadron was first activated on 1 October 1993 as the 7th Air Intelligence Squadron and fell under the 7th Air Operations Group. On 15 December 1994, 7 AF reorganized, creating the 607th Air Intelligence Group (607 AIG). The squadron was then redesignated on that date as the 607th Air Intelligence Squadron (607 AIS) and subordinate to the 607 AIG, along with the 303d Intelligence Squadron, which is under operational control of the 607 AIG. The squadron was absorbed into the 694th Intelligence Group on 7 April 2008.

Today the 607 AIS, working with its republic of Republic of Korea Air Force (ROKAF) counterpart, the 37th Tactical Intelligence Group, represent a key element in the U.S. commitment to the growth of combined USAF/ROKAF Intelligence capabilities. It is our combined responsibility to ensure our Intelligence products are timely, thorough, and accurate, for our enemy is one who takes his war fighting capabilities very seriously and is ever seeking the opportunity to put them to the test. We accept the challenge of the mission, carry it proudly into the future, and always stand ready and willing to continually meet the challenges faced by seventh air force and the air component command.

== Mission ==
The 607 AIS provides the Combined Forces Air Component Command (CFACC)/Commander, Seventh Air Force (7AF) with the Intelligence support necessary to plan, conduct, control and coordinate air operations in accordance with the tasks assigned by the commander, Air Component Command (CACC) and the commander, Pacific Air Forces (PACAF). These activities are accomplished through the commander, 607th Air Intelligence Group (607 AIG). Specific functions include indications and warning, analysis, targeting, collection management support, exploitation, and dissemination of all-source Intelligence information in support of combat planning, combat operations, Intelligence, Surveillance, and Reconnaissance (ISR) management, and combat readiness of 7AF and subordinate units to include theater gained assets. The 607 AIS is primarily an Aerospace Operations Center (AOC)unit. The 607 AIS provides substantive Intelligence support to 7AF, Air Component Command (ACC), United States Forces Korea (USFK) and in-country and deployed unit Intelligence staffs. Day-to-day the squadron commander organizes trains and equips his personnel to perform their roles and missions in the KOREAN AOC (KAOC). He ensures the squadron: develops and maintains the ability to immediately support theater combat operations; develops, tests, refines, documents, and exercises armistice/wartime operational procedures; establishes working relationships with members of ROK, allied and other U.S. forces which will enhance wartime effectiveness.

=== Analysis Flight ===
The 607 AIS, Intelligence Analysis Flight (INA) is the focal point for all-source Intelligence Preparation of the Battlespace (IPB) and the Predictive Intelligence Analysis for the 607 AIS and the Korean Air Operations Center (KAOC). INA provides daily assessments to the commander, Seventh Air Force (7AF), his staff, Korean counterparts, and the theater-gained units. During armistice, the analysis flight is designated as INA. During wartime, the analysis flight integrates as one of the five specialty teams into the Intelligence, Surveillance, and Reconnaissance division (ISRD) as the Analysis, Correlation, and Fusion (ACF) Flight. The mission of INA is to provide the Air Operations Center (AOC) ISRD an accurate picture of the battlespace and deliver predictive battlespace awareness to enable air component command's war fighting capabilities.

=== Operations Flight ===
Provide the commander, staff and subordinate units of 7AF/acc with fused, multi-source indications & warning. Provide support for theater SRO missions, ad hoc collections and time-sensitive targeting. Build and validate ISR collection strategies and manage validated component collection plans and requirements during armistice, crisis and wartime.

=== Imagery Flight ===
Provides IMINT support to Pacific Command (PACOM), United States Forces Korea (USFK), 7AF, Air Combat Command (ACC), and subordinate units for production of special imagery requirements. During crisis/wartime, supports the IMINT collection efforts of the acc/a-2.

=== Readiness Flight ===
The Readiness Flight exists to prepare all CFACC Intelligence units to execute combat operations. Specific responsibilities include: serves as point of contact responsible for overall management and development of all 7AF and acc Intelligence exercise participation; evaluates contingency and wartime plans, policies, procedures, and personnel augmentation; Intelligence planning and participation for exercise Ulchi Focus Lens (UFL), the world's largest command post exercise; Foal Eagle, the world's largest air base ground defense exercise; and other exercises as required; plans Intelligence portion of time phased force deployment data document; coordinates the development and implementation of Intelligence annexes to commander, Pacific Command, PACAF, USFK/CFC, ACC and 7AF casop, oplans and operational orders; serves as the point of contact to ensure all 7AF and acc Intelligence exercise procedures are realistic, meet command objectives, unit readiness requirements, and coordinates development of scenarios and procedures which are realistic, meet command objectives, test wartime procedures and readiness, and provide a method for identifying serious war fighting procedural problems; focal point for Intelligence support to peninsula wings and units tasked to deploy to theater in response to oplan tasking; responsible for 7AF training range imagery requirements; acts as theater point of contact for unit deployment/contingency issues; reviews and coordinates on a semi-annual basis with provisional wings all co-located operating base (COB) base support plans (chapter 14, Intelligence); focal point for Joint Worldwide Intelligence Communications System (JWICS) secure video-teleconferencing; during exercises, is responsible for the development and execution of the acc Intelligence control cells and evaluation functions.

=== Target Development Flight ===
Provide 7AF/CC and the Korean Theater Air Control System (KTACS) with all-source target Intelligence to plan, direct and control air operations with combined forces command components and allies during armistice, war or contingency.

=== Systems Flight ===
Provide superior Intelligence systems support to ensure the combat effectiveness of the 607th Air Intelligence Squadron during armistice and wartime through timely and focused customer support of small computers, theater battle management systems, and national and theater sensor systems and through proactive advocacy and planning for Intelligence-related systems requirements. Provide effective augmentation to Intelligence and shelter management work centers as required during exercise and contingency.

== See also ==
- Department of Defense (DoD)
- United States Air Force (USAF)
- Air Force ISR Agency
- 480th Intelligence Wing
- 607th Air Intelligence Group (AIG)
