= 1970 NCAA University Division football rankings =

- Season: 1970
- Bowl season: 1970–71 bowl games
- Preseason No. 1: Ohio State
- End of season champions: Nebraska (AP); Texas (Coaches)

Two human polls comprised the 1970 NCAA University Division football rankings. Unlike most sports, college football's governing body, the NCAA, does not bestow a national championship, instead that title is bestowed by one or more different polling agencies. There are two main weekly polls that begin in the preseason—the AP Poll and the Coaches Poll.

== Legend ==
	Increase in ranking
	Decrease in ranking
	Not ranked previous week
	National champion
(#–#)	Win–loss record
(Italics)	Number of first place votes
т	Tied with team above or below also with this symbol

== AP Poll ==
	Preseason Aug	Week 1 Sep 14	Week 2 Sep 21	Week 3 Sep 28	Week 4 Oct 5	Week 5 Oct 12	Week 6 Oct 19	Week 7 Oct 26	Week 8 Nov 2	Week 9 Nov 9	Week 10 Nov 16	Week 11 Nov 23	Week 12 Nov 30	Week 13 Dec 7	Week 14 Jan	
1.	Ohio State (19)	Ohio State (0–0) (24)	Ohio State (0–0) (14)	Ohio State (1–0) (25)	Ohio State (2–0) (27)	Ohio State (3–0) (20)	Ohio State (4–0) (19)	Texas (5–0) (15)	Texas (6–0) (20)	Notre Dame (7–0) (23)	Texas (8–0) (26)	Texas (8–0) (20)	Texas (9–0) (23)	Texas (10–0) (30)	Nebraska (11–0–1) (39)	1.
2.	Texas (7)	Texas (0–0) (6)	Texas (1–0) (16)	Texas (2–0) (14)	Texas (3–0) (6)	Texas (4–0) (13)	Texas (4–0) (9)	Ohio State (5–0) (16)	Notre Dame (6–0) (12)	Texas (7–0) (13)	Notre Dame (8–0) (7)	Ohio State (9–0) (14)	Ohio State (9–0) (12)	Ohio State (9–0) (10)	Notre Dame (10–1) (8)	2.
3.	USC (6)	USC (1–0) (7)	Stanford (2–0) (1)	Stanford (3–0) (1)	Notre Dame (3–0)	Notre Dame (4–0) (4)	Notre Dame (5–0) (4)	Notre Dame (5–0) (4)	Ohio State (6–0) (5)	Ohio State (7–0) (3)	Nebraska (9–0–1) (5)	Nebraska (10–0–1) (6)	Nebraska (10–0–1) (5)	Nebraska (10–0–1) (2)	Texas (10–1) (3)	3.
4.	Arkansas (1)	Stanford (1–0)	Penn State (1–0) (2)	Notre Dame (2–0)	USC (3–0–1) (3)	Ole Miss (4–0) (1)	Nebraska (5–0–1) (1)	Nebraska (6–0–1) (1)	Nebraska (7–0–1)	Nebraska (8–0–1) (3)	Michigan (9–0) (6)	Notre Dame (9–0) (3)	Arkansas (9–1)	Tennessee (10–1)	Tennessee (11–1)	4.
5.	Ole Miss (1)	Ole Miss (0–0) (1)	Ole Miss (1–0) (1)	USC (2–0–1) (1)	Ole Miss (3–0) (1)	Nebraska (4–0–1) (1)	Michigan (5–0) (1)	Michigan (6–0) (1)	Michigan (7–0) (2)	Michigan (8–0) (3)	Ohio State (8–0) (1)	Arkansas (9–1)	Tennessee (9–1)	LSU (9–2)	Ohio State (9–1)	5.
6.	Notre Dame	Notre Dame (0–0)	Notre Dame (1–0)	Nebraska (2–0–1)	Nebraska (3–0–1)	Michigan (4–0) (1)	Auburn (5–0) (1)	Stanford (6–1)	Stanford (7–1) (1)	Stanford (8–1)	Arkansas (8–1)	LSU (7–2)	Notre Dame (9–1)	Notre Dame (9–1)	Arizona State (11–0) (2)	6.
7.	Penn State (1)	Penn State (0–0) (1)	USC (1–0–1) (2)	Ole Miss (2–0)	Michigan (3–0) (1)	Air Force (5–0)	Air Force (6–0) (1)	Air Force (7–0) (1)	Arkansas (6–1)	Arkansas (7–1)	LSU (7–1)	Tennessee (8–1)	Michigan (9–1)	Michigan (9–1)	LSU (9–3)	7.
8.	Michigan	Michigan (0–0) (1)	Nebraska (1–0–1)	Colorado (2–0)	Air Force (4–0)	Auburn (4–0)	Stanford (5–1)	Arkansas (5–1)	Tennessee (6–1)	Auburn (7–1)	Tennessee (7–1)	Michigan (9–1)	LSU (8–2)	Arizona State (10–0) (2)	Stanford (9–3)	8.
9.	Nebraska	Nebraska (1–0)	Missouri (2–0)	Michigan (2–0) (1)	Auburn (3–0)	Stanford (4–1)	Arkansas (4–1)	Tennessee (5–1)	Air Force (8–0)	LSU (6–1)	Arizona State (8–0) (1)	Arizona State (9–0) (2)	Arizona State (9–0) (2)	Arkansas (9–2)	Michigan (9–1)	9.
10.	Stanford	Missouri (1–0)	Michigan (1–0) (1)	Air Force (3–0)	Arkansas (3–1)	Arkansas (4–1)	USC (4–1–1)	LSU (5–1)	Auburn (6–1)	Tennessee (7–1)	Air Force (9–1)	Ole Miss (7–1)	Auburn (8–2)	Auburn (8–2)	Auburn (9–2)	10.
11.	Missouri	Arkansas (0–1)	Houston (1–0)	Arkansas (2–1)	West Virginia (4–0)	USC (3–1–1)	Tennessee (4–1)	Arizona State (6–0)	LSU (5–1)	Arizona State (7–0) (1)	Stanford (8–2)	Auburn (7–2)	Air Force (9–2)	Air Force (9–2)	Arkansas (9–2)	11.
12.	LSU	LSU (0–0)	Arkansas (1–1)	Auburn (2–0)	Stanford (3–1)	Arizona State (4–0)	Arizona State (5–0)	Auburn (5–1)	Arizona State (6–0)	Ole Miss (6–1)	Ole Miss (7–1)	Air Force (9–2)	Stanford (8–3)	Stanford (8–3)	Toledo (12–0)	12.
13.	Houston	Kansas State (1–0)	Florida (2–0)	UCLA (3–0)	Georgia Tech (4–0)	Colorado (3–1)	Ole Miss (4–1)	Ole Miss (5–1)	Ole Miss (5–1)	Air Force (8–1)	Auburn (7–2)	Stanford (8–3)	Georgia Tech (8–3)	Georgia Tech (8–3)	Georgia Tech (9–3)	13.
14.	Kansas State	Florida (1–0)	Oklahoma (2–0)	West Virginia (3–0)	Arizona State (3–0)	Tennessee (3–1)	LSU (4–1)	San Diego State (6–0)	San Diego State (7–0)	San Diego State (8–0)	San Diego State (9–0)	Dartmouth (9–0)	Toledo (11–0)	Dartmouth (9–0)	Dartmouth (9–0)	14.
15.	Florida	Houston (0–0)	UCLA (2–0)	Georgia Tech (3–0)	UCLA (3–1)	LSU (3–1)	Houston (3–1)	Pittsburgh (5–1)	Toledo (8–0)	Dartmouth (7–0)	Toledo (10–0)	Toledo (11–0)	Dartmouth (9–0)	Toledo (11–0)	USC (6–4–1)	15.
16.	Alabama	UCLA (1–0)	West Virginia (2–0)	Penn State (1–1)	Missouri (3–1)	Georgia Tech (4–1)	UCLA (4–2)	Oregon (5–2)	UCLA (5–3)	Toledo (9–0)	Dartmouth (8–0)	Georgia Tech (7–3)	Ole Miss (7–2)	USC (6–4–1)	Air Force (9–3)	16.
17.	South Carolina	West Virginia (1–0)	Tennessee (1–0)	Alabama (2–1)	Colorado (2–1)	Texas Tech (4–1)	San Diego State (6–0)	Missouri (4–3)	Dartmouth (6–0)	UCLA (5–3)	Georgia Tech (7–3)	Penn State (7–3)	USC (6–4–1)	Houston (8–3)	Tulane (8–4)	17.
18.	UCLA	Oklahoma (1–0)	Colorado (1–0)	Arizona State (2–0)	North Carolina (4–0)	Missouri (3–2)	Pittsburgh (4–1)	USC (4–2–1)	Houston (3–2)	USC (5–3–1)	Northwestern (5–4)	Northwestern (6–4)	Penn State (7–3)	Penn State (7–3)	Penn State (7–3)	18.
19.	Arizona State	Georgia (0–0)	Georgia Tech (2–0)	North Carolina (3–0)	LSU (2–1)	Houston (2–1) т	Colorado (3–2) т	UCLA (4–3)	Alabama (5–3)	Oregon (6–3)	Texas Tech (8–2)	Colorado (6–4)	Northwestern (6–4)	Texas Tech (8–3)	Houston (8–3)	19.
20.	Auburn т; Oklahoma т; West Virginia т	Arizona State (0–0)	Air Force (2–0)	Missouri (2–1)	Tennessee (2–1)	UCLA (3–2) т	Toledo (6–0) т	Northwestern (3–3)	Syracuse (4–3)	Kansas State (6–3)	Penn State (6–3)	Washington (6–4)	Oklahoma (7–4)	Oklahoma (7–4)	Oklahoma (7–4–1) т; Ole Miss (7–4) т	20.
	Preseason Aug	Week 1 Sep 14	Week 2 Sep 21	Week 3 Sep 28	Week 4 Oct 5	Week 5 Oct 12	Week 6 Oct 19	Week 7 Oct 26	Week 8 Nov 2	Week 9 Nov 9	Week 10 Nov 16	Week 11 Nov 23	Week 12 Nov 30	Week 13 Dec 7	Week 14 Jan	
		Dropped: Alabama; South Carolina; Auburn	Dropped: LSU; Kansas State; Georgia; Arizona State	Dropped: Houston; Florida; Oklahoma; Tennessee	Dropped: Penn State; Alabama	Dropped: West Virginia; North Carolina	Dropped: Georgia Tech; Texas Tech; Missouri	Dropped: Houston; Colorado; Toledo	Dropped: Pittsburgh; Oregon; Missouri; USC; Northwestern	Dropped: Houston; Alabama; Syracuse	Dropped: UCLA; USC; Oregon; Kansas State	Dropped: San Diego State; Texas Tech	Dropped: Colorado; Washington	Dropped: Ole Miss; Northwestern	Dropped: Texas Tech	

== Coaches Poll ==
	Week 1 Sep 21	Week 2 Sep 28	Week 3 Oct 5	Week 4 Oct 12	Week 5 Oct 19 (Note: Less than 20 teams received votes in this poll.)	Week 6 Oct 26	Week 7 Nov 2	Week 8 Nov 9	Week 9 Nov 16	Week 10 Nov 23	Week 11 Nov 30	Week 12 Dec 7	
1.	Texas (1–0) (22)	Ohio State (1–0) (17)	Ohio State (2–0) (18)	Ohio State (3–0) (18)	Ohio State (4–0) (14)	Ohio State (5–0) (17)	Texas (6–0) (18)	Notre Dame (7–0) т (13)	Texas (8–0) (20)	Texas (8–0) (18)	Texas (9–0) (24)	Texas (10–0) (25)	1.
2.	Ohio State (0–0) (1)	Texas (2–0) (16)	Texas (3–0) (9)	Texas (4–0) (13)	Texas (4–0) (14)	Texas (5–0) (10)	Notre Dame (6–0) (7)	Texas (7–0) т (13)	Notre Dame (8–0) (6)	Ohio State (9–0) (6)	Ohio State (9–0) (5)	Ohio State (9–0) (6)	2.
3.	Penn State (1–0)	Notre Dame (2–0) (1)	Notre Dame (3–0) (4)	Notre Dame (4–0) (4)	Notre Dame (5–0) (5)	Notre Dame (5–0) (3)	Ohio State (6–0) (7)	Ohio State (7–0) (7)	Nebraska (9–0–1) (6)	Notre Dame (9–0) (4)	Nebraska (10–0–1) (4)	Nebraska (10–0–1) (2)	3.
4.	Stanford (1–0) (1)	USC (2–0–1) (1)	USC (3–0–1) (3)	Nebraska (4–0–1) (1)	Nebraska (5–0–1) (1)	Nebraska (6–0–1) (3)	Nebraska (7–0–1) (2)	Nebraska (8–0–1) (2)	Ohio State (8–0) (1)	Nebraska (10–0–1) (5)	Tennessee (9–1)	Tennessee (10–1)	4.
5.	USC (1–0–1) (1)	Stanford (3–0)	Nebraska (3–0–1) (1)	Ole Miss (4–0)	Auburn (5–0)	Michigan (6–0)	Stanford (7–1)	Michigan (8–0)	Michigan (9–0) (2)	Tennessee (8–1)	Arkansas (9–1)	Notre Dame (9–1)	5.
6.	Missouri (2–0) (1)	Nebraska (2–0–1)	Ole Miss (3–0)	Air Force (5–0)	Air Force (6–0)	Stanford (6–1)	Michigan (7–0)	Stanford (8–1)	Arkansas (8–1)	Arkansas (9–1)	Notre Dame (9–1)	LSU (9–2)	6.
7.	Ole Miss (1–0)	Colorado (2–0)	Air Force (4–0)	Michigan (4–0)	Michigan (5–0)	Air Force (7–0)	Air Force (8–0)	Auburn (7–1)	LSU (7–1)	Michigan (9–1)	Michigan (9–1)	Michigan (9–1)	7.
8.	Nebraska (1–0–1)	Ole Miss (2–0)	Michigan (3–0)	Auburn (4–0)	Stanford (5–1) (1)	Arkansas (5–1)	Arkansas (6–1)	Arkansas (7–1)	Air Force (9–1)	LSU (7–2)	LSU (8–2)	Arizona State (10–0)	8.
9.	Notre Dame (1–0)	Michigan (2–0)	Auburn (3–0)	Stanford (4–1)	Arkansas (4–1)	Tennessee (5–1)	Auburn (6–1)	LSU (6–1)	Tennessee (7–1)	Arizona State (9–0)	Arizona State (9–0)	Auburn (8–2)	9.
10.	Michigan (1–0)	Air Force (3–0)	Arkansas (3–1)	Arkansas (4–1)	Arizona State (5–0)	Arizona State (6–0)	Tennessee (6–1)	Tennessee (7–1)	Arizona State (8–0)	Ole Miss (7–1)	Auburn (8–2)	Stanford (8–3)	10.
11.	Houston (1–0)	Auburn (2–0)	Arizona State (3–0)	Arizona State (4–0)	USC (4–1–1)	LSU (5–1)	Arizona State (6–0)	Arizona State (7–0)	Stanford (8–2)	Auburn (7–2)	Stanford (8–3)	Air Force (9–2)	11.
12.	UCLA (2–0)	Arkansas (2–1)	Stanford (3–1)	USC (3–1–1)	Tennessee (4–1)	Auburn (5–1)	LSU (5–1)	Air Force (8–1)	Ole Miss (7–1)	Stanford (8–3)	Air Force (9–2)	Arkansas (9–2)	12.
13.	Oklahoma (2–0)	Oklahoma (2–1) т	Missouri (3–1) т	Colorado (3–1)	Ole Miss (4–1)	Ole Miss (5–1)	Ole Miss (5–1)	Ole Miss (6–1)	Auburn (7–2)	Dartmouth (9–0)	Dartmouth (9–0)	Houston (8–3)	13.
14.	Tennessee (1–0)	UCLA (3–0) т	UCLA (3–1) т	South Carolina (3–1–1)	Houston (3–1)	San Diego State (6–0)	San Diego State (7–0)	Dartmouth (7–0)	Dartmouth (8–0) т	UCLA (6–4)	Houston (7–3)	Dartmouth (9–0)	14.
15.	Florida (2–0)	Arizona State (2–0)	Georgia Tech (4–0)	Georgia Tech (4–1) т	San Diego State (6–0)	Oregon (5–2)	Dartmouth (6–0)	Alabama (5–4) т	San Diego State (9–0) т	Alabama (6–4)	Ole Miss (7–2)	Oklahoma (7–4)	15.
16.	Purdue (1–0) т	Georgia Tech (3–0)	West Virginia (4–0)	Houston (2–1) т	UCLA (4–2)	UCLA (5–2) т	UCLA (5–3)	USC (5–3–1) т	Alabama (6–4) т	Air Force (9–2) т	Colorado (6–4) т	Colorado (6–4)	16.
17.	Colorado (1–0) т	Alabama (2–1) т	Tennessee (2–1)	Tennessee (3–1) т	LSU (4–1) т	Yale (5–0) т	Alabama (5–3) т	San Diego State (8–0) т	USC (5–3–1) т	Houston (6–3) т	Oklahoma (7–4) т	Georgia Tech (8–3) т	17.
18.	Arkansas (1–1)	Penn State (1–1) т	Colorado (2–1)	UCLA (3–2) т	Toledo (6–0) т	Dartmouth (5–0) т	Houston (3–2) т	UCLA (5–3) т	Toledo (10–0)	Toledo (11–0) т	UCLA (6–4) т	Toledo (11–0) т	18.
19.	Auburn (1–0) т	West Virginia (3–0) т	Oklahoma (2–1)	San Diego State (5–0) т		Pittsburgh (5–1) т	Toledo (8–0) т	Toledo (9–0)		Florida State (7–3) т	Toledo (11–0) т	Penn State (7–3) т	19.
20.	Washington (1–0) т; West Virginia (2–0) т	San Diego State (3–0)	San Diego State (4–0)	West Virginia (4–1) т		Toledo (7–0) т				San Diego State (9–1) т	Georgia Tech (8–3)	USC (6–4–1) т	20.
	Week 1 Sep 21	Week 2 Sep 28	Week 3 Oct 5	Week 4 Oct 12	Week 5 Oct 19	Week 6 Oct 26	Week 7 Nov 2	Week 8 Nov 9	Week 9 Nov 16	Week 10 Nov 23	Week 11 Nov 30	Week 12 Dec 7	
		Dropped: Missouri; Houston; Tennessee; Florida; Purdue; Washington	Dropped: Alabama; Penn State	Dropped: Missouri; Oklahoma	Dropped: Colorado; South Carolina; Georgia Tech; West Virginia	Dropped: USC; Houston	Dropped: Oregon; Yale; Pittsburgh	Dropped: Houston	Dropped: UCLA	Dropped: USC	Dropped: Alabama; Florida State; San Diego State	Dropped: Ole Miss; UCLA	

The final UPI Coaches Poll was released prior to the bowl games, in early December. Two coaches on the 35-member board did not submit votes. Texas received 25 of the 33 first place votes; Ohio State received six and Nebraska two.

- Prior to the 1975 season, the Big Ten and Pac-8 conferences allowed only one postseason participant each, for the Rose Bowl.
- The Ivy League has prohibited its members from participating in postseason football since the league was officially formed in 1954.
