= 1971 All-Pacific-8 Conference football team =

American college football all-conference team

The 1971 All-Pacific-8 Conference football team consisted of American football players chosen for All-Pacific-8 Conference teams for the 1971 NCAA University Division football season. The team was selected by the conference's eight head coaches.

== Offensive selections ==
=== Quarterbacks ===
- Don Bunce, Stanford (AP-1)

=== Running backs ===
- Bernard Jackson, Washington State (AP-1)
- Ahmad Rashad, Oregon (AP-1)

=== Ends/receivers ===
- Bob Christiansen, UCLA (AP-1)
- Tom Scott, Washington (AP-1)

=== Flankers ===
- Steve Sweeney, California (AP-1)

=== Tackles ===
- Tom Drougas, Oregon (AP-1)
- John Vella, USC (AP-1)

=== Guards ===
- Steve Busch, Washington State (AP-1)
- John McKean, Oregon (AP-1)

=== Centers ===
- Dave Dalby, UCLA (AP-1)

== Defensive selections ==
=== Ends ===
- John Grant, USC (AP-1)
- Jim Sherbert, Oregon State (AP-1)

=== Linemen ===
- Larry Butler, Stanford (AP-1)
- Gordy Guinn, Washington (AP-1)
- Pete Lazetich, Stanford (AP-1)
- Sherman White, California (AP-1)

=== Linebackers ===
- Steve Brown, Oregon State (AP-1)
- Willie Hall, USC (AP-1)
- Jeff Siemon, Stanford (AP-1)

=== Defensive backs ===
- Bill Drake, Oregon (AP-1)
- Calvin Jones, Washington (AP-1)
- Ron Mims, Washington State (AP-1)
- Ray Youngblood, California (AP-1)

== Extra teams ==
=== Placekickers ===
- Don Sweet, Washington State (AP-1)

== See also ==
- 1971 College Football All-America Team
