= Rogers Field (Washington) =

Demolished stadium in Washington, US

Coordinates: 46.732°N 117.160°W

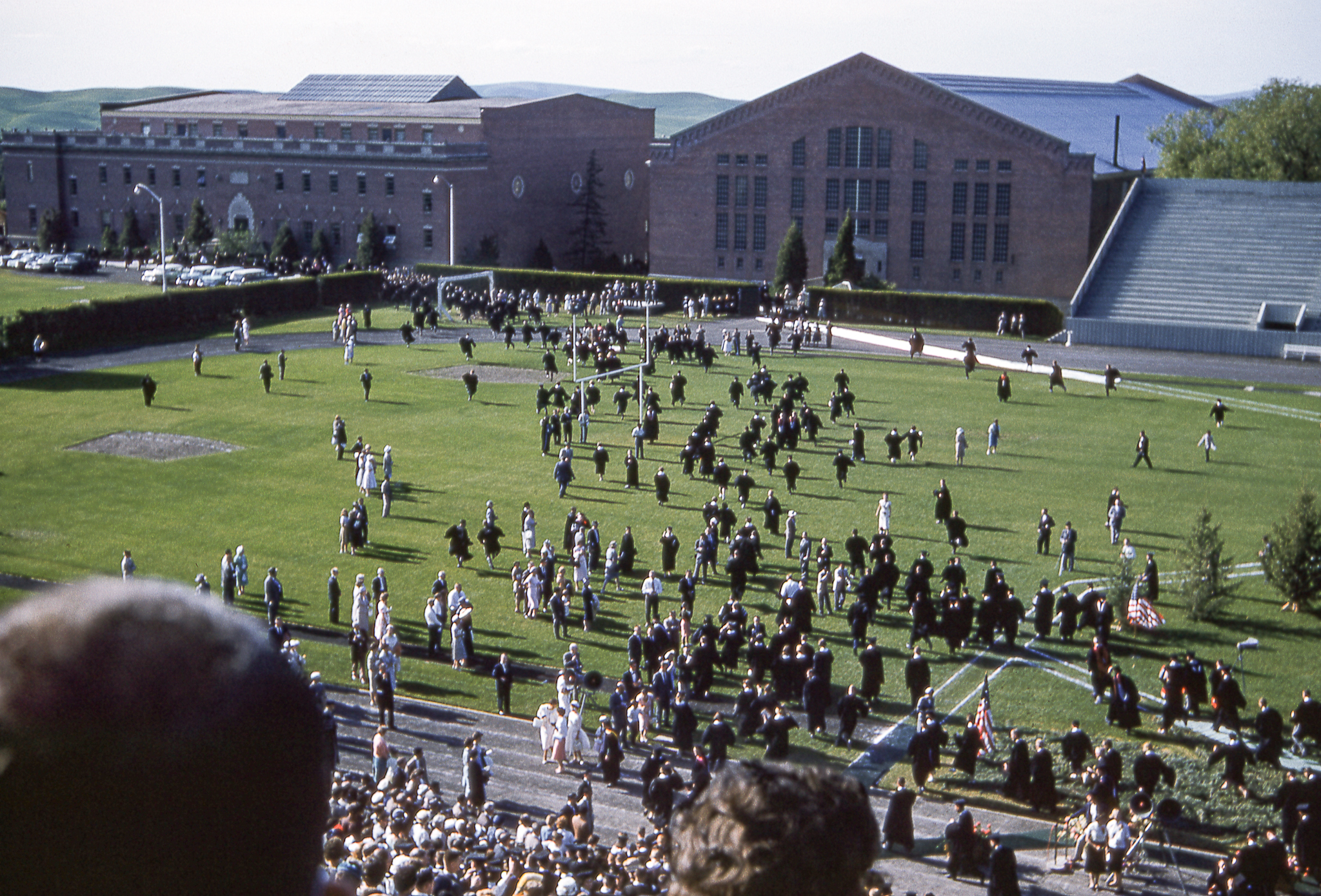
- Commencement ceremonies in 1960

- Location in the United States Location in Washington
- Interactive map of Rogers Field
- Former names: Soldier Field (1892–1901)
- Address: Stadium Way
- Location: Washington State University; Pullman, Washington, U.S.
- Owner: Washington State University
- Operator: Washington State University
- Capacity: 23,500
- Surface: Natural grass

Construction
- Groundbreaking: 1892
- Opened: 1892, 1895 (football)
- Renovated: 1936
- Closed: 1970 – November
- Demolished: 1971 (south grandstand); 1974 (north grandstand); 1999 (east grandstand)

Tenants
- WSU Cougars (1892–1969) (Pacific-8 Conference, NCAA); Idaho Vandals (1969–70) – NCAA

Rogers Field was an outdoor athletic stadium in the northwest United States, on the campus of Washington State University in Pullman, Washington. It was the home venue of the WSU Cougars football and track teams until severely damaged by a fire in April 1970. Partially demolished in early 1971, Rogers Field was replaced by the concrete Martin Stadium, which was built on the same site and opened in 1972.

== History ==
Originally opened 134 years ago in 1892 for track and field and named "Soldier Field", it hosted its first football game in 1895, when WSU defeated its Palouse neighbor Idaho 10–4. In 1902, the stadium was renamed for Governor John Rogers, who died in office the previous December. In its early years, it also hosted Cougar baseball, with home plate in the southeast corner. The final structure was completely rebuilt in 1936.

The 23,500-seat wooden stadium had a horseshoe-shaped three-section grandstand, open on the west end, with a quarter-mile (402 m) running track. The press box sat at the top of the south sideline's grandstand, and the playing field was natural grass, at an elevation of 2,530 feet (770 m) above sea level. The field was unlit, but plans were in place to install AstroTurf for the 1970 season. The running track was cinder until replaced by an all-weather rubberized surface in early 1968.

During what came to be its final WSU season in 1969, Rogers Field was also the home for the neighboring Idaho Vandals. Their Neale Stadium, also wooden, had been condemned during the summer of 1969 due to soil erosion and was to be rebuilt with concrete grandstands, ready in 1970 (or 1971). Idaho played its limited Palouse home schedule in 1969 (3 games) at Rogers Field, and due to delays in their project had planned on playing there again in 1970 (4 games). During the ten-game schedules of the late 1960s, the WSU football team split its usual allotment of four home games equally between Spokane and Pullman (two games each).

== Fire ==
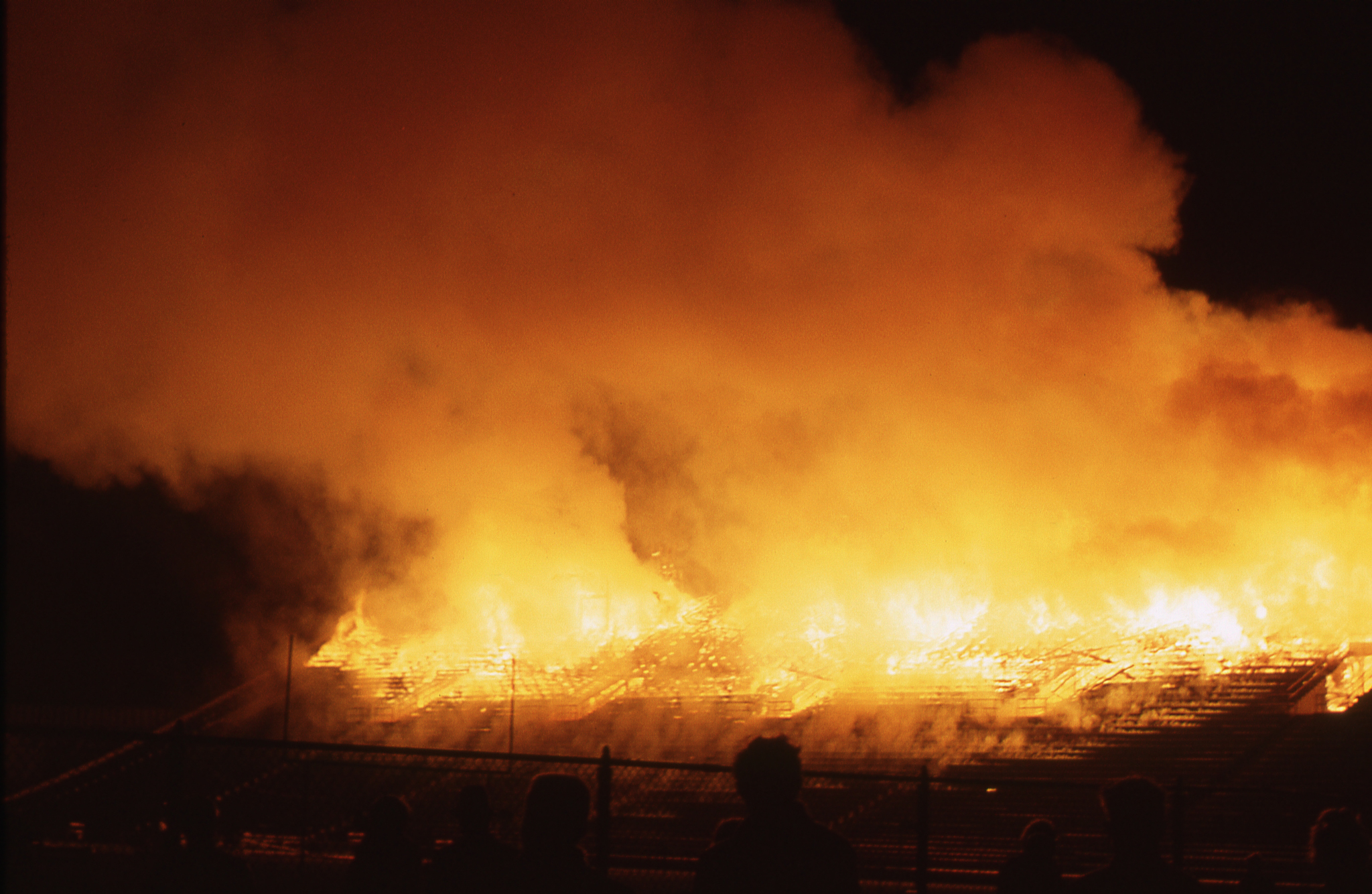
The south grandstand on fire on April 4, 1970

A suspicious fire in 1970 significantly damaged the south grandstand and press box of Rogers Field late on Saturday, April 4, the first day of spring break. A definitive cause of the blaze was not determined, but was widely believed to have been arson. A track & field meet with Oregon State had been held at the stadium earlier in the day. Idaho's idle (and condemned) Neale Stadium had burned less than five months earlier in November 1969, also a suspected arson which burned its south grandstand and press box.

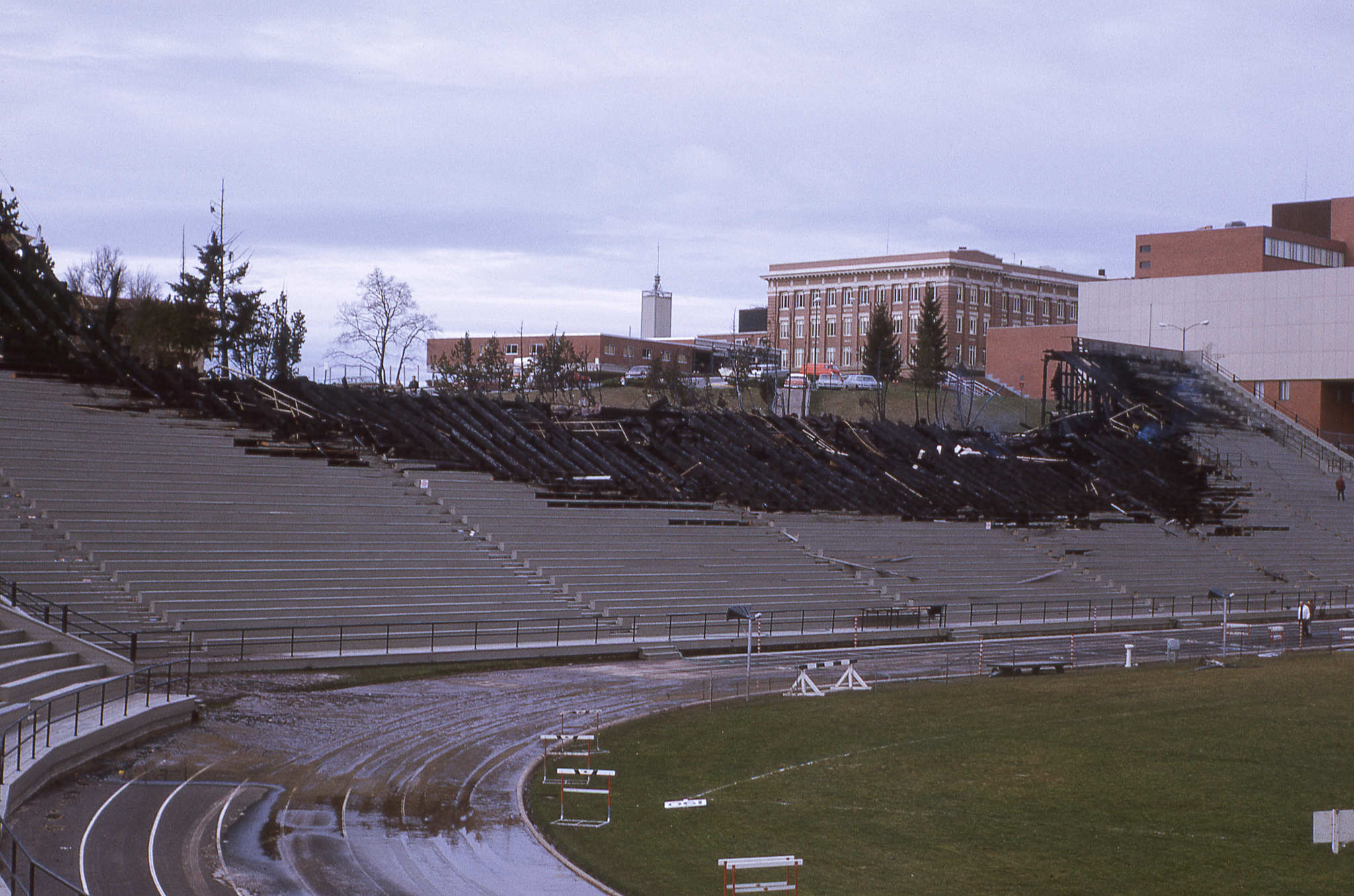
Fire aftermath

The two-year-old all-weather track at Rogers was saved by students, mostly track athletes, who jumped the fence prior to the arrival of the fire department. The track sections nearest to the fire were watered down to keep them cool, and the highly-flammable foam landing pits (pole vault and high jump) were quickly moved to the grass infield.

Prior to the fire, the WSU Cougars had planned to play three home games, all in the Pac-8, at Joe Albi Stadium in Spokane in 1970, which was installing AstroTurf that summer. The two scheduled for Pullman were Idaho in mid-September and Oregon State in mid-November. Various sites were considered, including Husky Stadium in Seattle and Civic Stadium in Portland, but WSU played all five games in Spokane. Despite another one-win season and low turnout for the USC and Oregon State games in November, WSU set a home attendance record in 1970.

Requiring less seating capacity, Idaho opted to stay put on the Palouse in 1970 and played its four home games at the partially destroyed stadium in Pullman. The game between the teams, the so-called "Displaced Bowl", was easily won by WSU on September 19 in Spokane. It ended a ten-game losing streak for Jim Sweeney's Cougars, dating back to the 1969 season opener. As WSU's home opener, the game drew 27,200 spectators, at the time the largest for football in Spokane outside the Apple Cup.

The victory over Idaho was the only one for WSU in 1970, as their next win came in the third game of the 1971 season. With the new stadium in Pullman under construction in 1971, the Cougars again played their full home schedule in Spokane, four games, but waited until the last one on October 30 to post a home victory. WSU defeated Oregon, led by quarterback Dan Fouts and running back Bobby Moore (later Ahmad Rashad). The 31–21 win evened WSU's record to 4–4 and 2–2 in the Pac-8, with visions of a possible league title and Rose Bowl appearance. It followed a Cougar upset of defending Rose Bowl champion Stanford by a point on the road; that was Stanford's only conference blemish in 1971, and they repeated as Rose Bowl champions. November was not as fortunate for WSU, which went winless on the road against USC, Oregon State, and Washington to finish at 4–7.

Poor weather in the spring of 1971 caused delays in the construction of Idaho's new stadium, and the Vandals played "home" games at Bronco Stadium in Boise and at Joe Albi in Spokane in September. After a three-year absence, the UI Vandals returned to campus in Moscow on October 9 at their new "Idaho Stadium", originally an outdoor venue with natural grass. The debut game was a Vandal victory over Idaho State, and Idaho won eight straight games and finished at 8–3, their best football record to date. Artificial turf was installed the next year, and the stadium was enclosed three years later in 1975, renamed the Kibbie Dome.

== Martin Stadium ==
The new concrete football stadium opened on the site of Rogers Field in 1972. It had a modest seating capacity of 22,600, a running track, lights, and an AstroTurf playing field. The first game in Martin Stadium was on September 30, a disappointing 19-point loss to the Utah Utes of the WAC, with 20,600 in attendance. Initially, only the south grandstand and press box were new in 1972; the old north grandstand was demolished after the 1974 season, and the east end zone seats from Rogers were finally replaced in 1999.

Following the 1978 season, the running track was removed and the field level was lowered 16 feet (4.9 m), allowing a seating capacity expansion with thirteen new rows of seats. The revamped Martin Stadium debuted in mid-October 1979, with an inspired victory over the UCLA Bruins.

The last Apple Cup in Spokane was played 46 years ago in 1980, but the Cougars continued to play several home games there through the 1983 season. The WSU academic calendar was changed from a delayed semester to the traditional semester schedule in 1984. With classes starting four weeks earlier in late August, WSU students were now on campus for the entire football season, and the Spokane games were eliminated. (Home games in Seattle at CenturyLink Field were played from 2002 to 2014.)

The name "Rogers Field" continues on campus, transferred to an area used for soccer practices and intramurals, adjacent to the west end of Martin Stadium.
