= 1972 Denver Broncos season =

American football team season

- Owner: Gerald Phipps
- General manager: John Ralston
- Head coach: John Ralston
- Home stadium: Mile High Stadium

Results
- Record: 5–9
- Division place: 3rd AFC West
- Playoffs: Did not qualify

The 1972 Denver Broncos season was the team's 13th season in professional football and third in the National Football League (NFL). Under first-year head coach and general manager John Ralston, the Broncos finished with five wins and nine losses, third in the AFC West Division.

Hired in early January, Ralston was previously the head coach for nine years at Stanford University; in his final two seasons, he led the Indians to consecutive Pac-8 titles and upset victories in the Rose Bowl.

== Offseason ==
=== NFL draft ===
1972 Denver Broncos draft
Round	Pick	Player	Position	College	Notes
1	5	Riley Odoms *	Tight end	Houston	
3	58	Bill Phillips	LB	Arkansas State	
4	102	Tom Graham	LB	Oregon	
5	118	Jim Krieg	WR	Washington	
8	186	Ron Estay	DT	LSU	
9	214	Floyd Priester	DB	Boston University	
10	239	Richard Wilkins	DE	Maryland State	
11	263	Larry Brunson	WR	Colorado	
12	292	Randy McDougall	DB	Weber State	
13	317	Bob Warner	RB	Bloomsburg (PA)	
14	342	Jerome Kundich	G	Texas-El Paso	
15	370	Harold Parmenter	DT	Massachusetts	
16	395	Tom Bougus	RB	Boston College	
17	420	Lou Harris	RB	USC	
Made roster † Pro Football Hall of Fame * Made at least one Pro Bowl during career

== Personnel ==
=== Staff / Coaches ===
1972 Denver Broncos staff
Front office: Team Owner / Chairman of the Board – Gerald Phipps; Team President – Allan Phipps; Assistant General Manager/Director of Player Personnel – Fred Gehrke; Director of Scouting – Carroll Hardy; Head coaches: Vice President/General Manager/Head Coach – John Ralston; Offensive coaches: Offensive Coordinator/Backfield – Max Coley; Wide Receivers – Dick Coury; Offensive Line – Jerry Frei	Defensive coaches: Defensive Coordinator/Defensive Backs – Joe Collier; Defensive Line – Doc Urich; Linebackers – Bob Gambold; Special teams coaches: Special Teams – Myrel Moore

=== Roster ===
1972 Denver Broncos roster
Quarterbacks (QB): 16 Mike Ernst; 12 Charley Johnson; 10 Steve Ramsey; Running backs (RB): 33 Joe Dawkins; 44 Floyd Little; 22 Fran Lynch; 35 Clem Turner; Wide receivers (WR): 86 Jim Krieg; 25 Haven Moses; 84 Rod Sherman; 42 Billy Van Heusen P; Tight ends (TE): 81 Billy Masters; 88 Riley Odoms	Offensive linemen (OL): 66 Bill Cottrell G; 74 Mike Current T; 68 Larron Jackson G; 59 Larry Kaminski C; 61 Tommy Lyons G; 78 Marv Montgomery T; 50 Bobby Maples C; 64 Mike Schnitker G; 75 Rick Sharp T; Defensive linemen (DL): 77 Lyle Alzado DE; 55 Pete Duranko DT; 87 John Hoffman DE; 70 Paul Smith DT	Linebackers (LB): 53 Ken Criter MLB; 57 Bob Geddes OLB; 83 Tom Graham MLB; 58 Bill McKoy OLB; 54 Chip Myrtle OLB; 51 Mike Simone OLB; Defensive backs (DB): 20 Charlie Greer SS; 41 Leroy Mitchell CB; 21 Randy Montgomery CB; 24 Dennis Pete CB; 23 Steve Preece FS; 26 George Saimes FS; 36 Bill Thompson CB; Special teams (ST): 15 Jim Turner K	Practice squad: 47 Tony Harris WR; 13 Don Horn QB; 65 Lloyd Voss DE; 29 Bill West CB; Reserve: 11 Bobby Anderson RB (IR); 73 Walt Barnes DE (IR); 72 Sam Brunelli T (IR); 76 Tom Domres DT (IR); 52 Fred Forsberg LB (IR); 67 George Goeddeke C (IR); 62 Jerry Inman DT (IR); 56 Don Parish LB (IR); -- Bill Phillips LB (IR); 80 Jerry Simmons WR (IR); Rookies in italics 40 active, 10 reserve, 0 practice squad

== Regular season ==
=== Schedule ===
The Broncos' last three home games kicked off at noon MST instead of the standard 2 p.m.

Week	Date	Opponent	Result	Record	Venue	Attendance
1	September 17	Houston Oilers	**W** 30–17	1–0	Mile High Stadium	51,656
2	September 24	at **San Diego Chargers**	**L** 14–37	1–1	San Diego Stadium	49,048
3	October 1	**Kansas City Chiefs**	**L** 24–45	1–2	Mile High Stadium	51,656
4	October 8	at Cincinnati Bengals	**L** 10–21	1–3	Riverfront Stadium	55,812
5	October 15	Minnesota Vikings	**L** 20–23	1–4	Mile High Stadium	51,656
6	October 22	at **Oakland Raiders**	**W** 30–23	2–4	Oakland–Alameda County Coliseum	53,551
7	October 29	Cleveland Browns	**L** 20–27	2–5	Mile High Stadium	51,656
8	November 5	at New York Giants	**L** 17–29	2–6	Yankee Stadium	62,689
9	November 12	at Los Angeles Rams	**W** 16–10	3–6	Los Angeles Memorial Coliseum	65,398
10	November 19	**Oakland Raiders**	**L** 20–37	3–7	Mile High Stadium	51,656
11	November 26	at Atlanta Falcons	**L** 20–23	3–8	Atlanta–Fulton County Stadium	58,850
12	December 3	at **Kansas City Chiefs**	**L** 21–24	3–9	Arrowhead Stadium	66,725
13	December 10	**San Diego Chargers**	**W** 38–13	4–9	Mile High Stadium	51,478
14	December 17	New England Patriots	**W** 45–21	5–9	Mile High Stadium	51,656
Note: Intra-division opponents are in **bold** text.

=== Standings ===
AFC West
	W	L	T	PCT	DIV	CONF	PF	PA	STK
Oakland Raiders	10	3	1	.750	3–2–1	7–3–1	365	248	W6
Kansas City Chiefs	8	6	0	.571	4–2	6–5	287	254	W3
Denver Broncos	5	9	0	.357	2–4	4–6	325	350	W2
San Diego Chargers	4	9	1	.321	2–3–1	4–6–1	264	344	L3
