= 1972 Rose Bowl =

American college football game

- 58th Rose Bowl Game
Stanford Indians	Michigan Wolverines
(8–3)	(11–0)
Pac-8	Big Ten
13	12
Head coach: John Ralston	Head coach: Bo Schembechler
AP / Coaches; 16 / 16	AP / Coaches; 4 / 4
	1	2	3	4	Total
Stanford	0	0	3	10	13
Michigan	0	3	0	9	12
- Date: January 1, 1972
- Season: 1971
- Stadium: Rose Bowl
- Location: Pasadena, California
- MVP: Don Bunce (QB, Stanford)
- Favorite: Michigan by 10½ points
- Referee: Jerry Markbreit (Big Ten) (split crew: Big Ten, Pac-8)
- Attendance: 103,154

United States TV coverage
- Network: NBC
- Announcers: Curt Gowdy, Al DeRogatis
- Nielsen ratings: 29.2

The 1972 Rose Bowl was the 58th edition of the college football bowl game, played at the Rose Bowl in Pasadena, California, on Saturday, January 1. The Stanford Indians of the Pacific-8 Conference upset the undefeated and fourth-ranked Michigan Wolverines of the Big Ten Conference by a point, 13–12, repeating as Rose Bowl champions. The Player of the Game was Stanford quarterback Don Bunce.

== Teams ==
=== Michigan Wolverines ===
Michigan started the season with a 21–6 win at preseason #20 Northwestern. They rose to as high as second in the rankings by winning their next eight games by a combined score of 358–40, including three straight shutouts over non-conference opponents (Virginia, UCLA, Navy) by an aggregate of 134–0.

But the Wolverines were almost caught looking ahead to their showdown with rival Ohio State, and escaped with a 20–17 win at Purdue. They then beat the unranked Buckeyes 10–7 to finish as undefeated Big Ten champions. It was the Wolverines' first undefeated regular season in 33 years, and they made their second appearance in the Rose Bowl under third-year coach Bo Schembechler.

=== Stanford Indians ===
The Indians had won the previous year's Rose Bowl behind the heroics of Heisman Trophy winner Jim Plunkett, who was the first pick of the 1971 NFL draft. Plunkett's backup Don Bunce, running back Jackie Brown, and the "Thunderchickens" defense, led Indians to an 8–3 record in 1971 and a return appearance in the Rose Bowl. Stanford's key wins came against Dan Fouts and Oregon (38–17), at USC (33–18), and at eleventh-ranked Washington (17–6), led by quarterback Sonny Sixkiller.

Stanford concluded the regular season with three home games, the first over struggling UCLA, a 20–9 win that was tied at three at halftime. However, they were caught looking ahead to the Rose Bowl decider vs. rival California, and were upset by San Jose State 13–12, a non-conference game in which kicker Rod Garcia missed all five kicks; four field goal attempts and an extra point try. They rebounded and ended the regular season with a 14–0 shutout over archrival Cal to secure the Pac-8 title.

This Rose Bowl was the last football game that Stanford played as the "Indians," which was abolished by the university in March 1972, after objections from Native American students and a vote by the student senate. Stanford's athletic teams became the "Cardinals," referring to the school's primary color; it was reduced to the singular "Cardinal" in 1982.

== Game summary ==
Michigan came into the game on New Year's Day ranked fourth, but had little hope of winning the national championship as #1 Nebraska was facing #2 Alabama in the Orange Bowl that night (won by Nebraska, 38–6). It was the first Rose Bowl meeting between the two schools since the inaugural seventy years earlier in 1902, in which Michigan crushed Stanford 49–0. In the 1972 rematch, Michigan was favored by 10½ points.

The game started slowly, as rain the previous week had made the turf soggy and both teams showed stout defense. In the first quarter, Stanford placekicker Rod Garcia attempted field goals from 52 and 55 yards, but missed both. Michigan kicker Dana Coin made a 30-yard field goal in the second quarter for the only score in the first half. In the first series of the second half, Stanford stopped the Wolverines on 4th and 1 at Stanford's 4-yard line, then marched down to tie the game on Garcia's 42-yard field goal.

As the fourth quarter began, Michigan's Fritz Seyferth scored on a one-yard dive to put Michigan up 10–3. After Stanford got the ball back, they faced fourth and ten from their own 33. Coach Ralston called for a fake punt, with Jim Kehl receiving the snap and handing the ball forward to Jackie Brown, through his legs; he ran 33 yards for a first down, and followed up a minute later with a 24-yard touchdown run to tie the game.

Late in the fourth quarter, Michigan recovered a Stanford fumble near midfield. Facing fourth down with time running down, the Wolverines attempted a 46-yard field goal. The kick was short and right, and Stanford safety Jim Ferguson caught the ball and attempted to run it out of the end zone. He advanced to the seven but cut to the center and retreated; he was knocked back into the end zone by Ed Shuttlesworth for a controversial Michigan safety, as replays seemed to show that Ferguson's forward progress was to the 3-yard line. The official that made the call was back judge William Quinby of the Big Ten. This made the score 12–10 with just over three minutes to play, and Michigan due to get the ball on a free kick.

Following the free kick from the twenty, Michigan started from their own 45; they kept the ball on the ground but the Indians held for a three-and-out, and Stanford called a timeout prior to the punt. They got the ball back on their own 22-yard line with 1:48 to go. Bunce then threw five consecutive completions to take Stanford to the Michigan 17 with 22 seconds left. The Indians ran two more running plays followed by timeouts to get to the 14-yard-line with sixteen seconds left, and Garcia successfully kicked a 31-yard field goal to give Stanford its first lead and a 13–12 upset.

== Scoring ==
=== First quarter ===
- None

=== Second quarter ===
- Michigan – Dana Coin 30-yard field goal, 10:15

=== Third quarter ===
- Stanford – Rod Garcia 42-yard field goal, 5:40

=== Fourth quarter ===
- Michigan – Fritz Seyferth 1-yard run (Coin kick), 13:01
- Stanford – Jackie Brown 24-yard run (Garcia kick), 6:29
- Michigan – Safety: Ed Shuttlesworth tackled Jim Ferguson, 3:18
- Stanford – Garcia 31-yard field goal, 0:12

== Statistics ==
Statistics	Stanford	Michigan
First downs	22	16
Rushes–yards	23–93	74–264
Passing yards	290	26
Passes	24–44–0	3–11–1
Total yards	383	290
Punts–average	4–42	7–39
Fumbles lost	4	1
Turnovers by	4	2
Yards penalized	14	23

== Aftermath ==
This was the final Rose Bowl contested under the Big Ten's "no-repeat" policy, which prohibited conference teams from appearing in the game in back-to-back seasons. The no-repeat rule was repealed December 9, 1971.

Bunce finished 24 of 44 for 290 yards and was named the game's MVP. He played one year of professional football in the Canadian Football League before leaving football to become a successful orthopedic surgeon, eventually serving as team doctor for Stanford's football team from 1982 to 1992. The game was the last football game Stanford played as the "Indians", becoming the "Cardinals" the following year before eventually becoming the singular "Cardinal" (the color) by 1981. Stanford would not return to the Rose Bowl until 2000 and did not win another Rose Bowl until 2013.

Two Indians were top 10 selections in the 1972 NFL draft. Offensive tackle Greg Sampson went sixth overall to the Houston Oilers, and linebacker Jeff Siemon went 10th to the Minnesota Vikings. Siemon was the Vikings' starting middle linebacker in three Super Bowl losses (VIII, IX and XI, the last of which was the first Super Bowl played at the Rose Bowl stadium) and played 11 seasons for the club. Siemon cracked the starting lineup as a rookie and remained in the lineup through 1981. Sampson played eight seasons in Houston, first playing defensive tackle under coach Bill Peterson for two seasons, then switching to offense in 1974 under Sid Gillman and holding down the starting left tackle slot for five seasons under Gillman and Bum Phillips.

Ralston departed Palo Alto shortly after the Rose Bowl to accept the head coaching position of the National Football League's Denver Broncos, continuing a trend of college coaches moving to the NFL which began the previous year with Dan Devine (Missouri to the Green Bay Packers) and Tommy Prothro (UCLA Bruins to the Los Angeles Rams), and continued with Chuck Fairbanks (Oklahoma to the New England Patriots), Don Coryell (San Diego State to the St. Louis Cardinals), Rick Forzano (Navy to the Detroit Lions), Lou Holtz (North Carolina State to the New York Jets), John McKay (USC to the Tampa Bay Buccaneers) and Dick Vermeil (UCLA to the Philadelphia Eagles). The Broncos did not make the playoffs during any of Ralston's five seasons (1972–1976), but he acquired many of the players who formed the nucleus of Denver's legendary "Orange Crush" defense which led the franchise to Super Bowl XII under rookie coach Red Miller in 1977. Under Ralston, the Broncos experienced their first winning season, a 7–5–2 campaign in 1973.

Michigan fell to sixth in the AP poll, trailing three schools from the Big Eight Conference (Nebraska, Oklahoma, Colorado), Alabama, and Penn State. The Wolverines did not play in a bowl game in 1972, 1973, or 1974, despite a regular season record of 30–2–1 in that period. Michigan was done in an 0–2–1 record vs. Ohio State, with the losses, both in Columbus, by a combined five points, and the Big Ten's "Rose Bowl or No Bowl" policy, also observed by the Pac-8, which was rescinded before the 1975 season. This allowed an 8–1–2 Michigan team (which again lost to Ohio State) the opportunity to play in the Orange Bowl. The Wolverines and Buckeyes tied 10–10 in 1973 to leave, but Ohio State received the Rose Bowl berth on a 6–4 vote of Big Ten athletic directors (rumors circulated that two ADs, rumored to be from Illinois and Michigan State, possibly switched their votes from the 10-0-1 Wolverines to the 9-0-1 Buckeyes due to a serious injury to Michigan quarterback Dennis Franklin).

Schembechler's Wolverines returned to three consecutive Rose Bowls from 1977 to 1979, but lost all three (by 8, 7, and 7 points). In 1981, the Wolverines finally won their first bowl game under the legendary coach, breaking a six-game losing streak in the Rose Bowl by the Big Ten. Fittingly, Schembechler's 21-year career at Michigan ended with a loss in the 1990 Rose Bowl, leaving him 2–8 in the "Grandaddy Of Them All" (his other Rose Bowl win was in 1989).

Referee Jerry Markbreit later became the first to serve as referee in four Super Bowls (XVII, XXI, XXVI, XXIX; the first two in Pasadena) during his 23-year NFL officiating career (1976–98), but this was his only bowl game as a college official (the Rose Bowl used a split crew of Big Ten and West Coast officials from 1947-1991; the Big Ten assigned the referee for the game following odd-numbered seasons). Bill Quinby, the back judge who made the controversial safety call against Stanford, officiated in the NFL as a side judge from 1978–94, working Super Bowl XIX following the 1984 season.

== Video ==
- YouTube – 1972 Rose Bowl – NBC Sports telecast
