= 1971 Washington State Cougars football team =

American college football season

1971 Washington State Cougars football
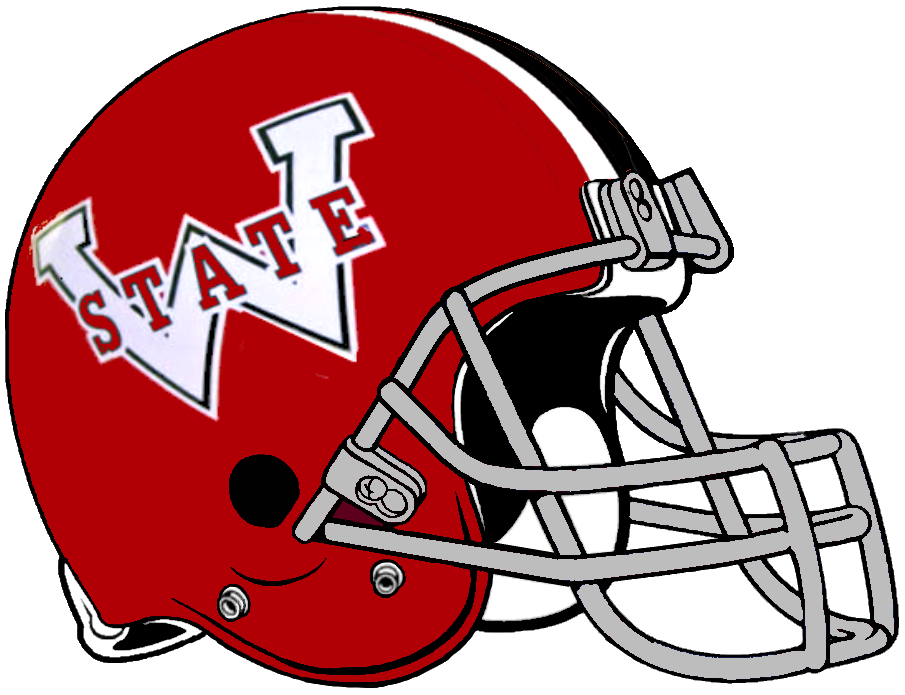
- Conference: Pacific-8 Conference
- Record: 4–7 (2–5 Pac-8)
- Head coach: Jim Sweeney (4th season)
- Offensive coordinator: Joe Tiller (1st season)
- Defensive coordinator: Sam Jankovich (4th season)
- Captains: Brian Lange; Ken Lyday; Steve Busch
- Home stadium: Joe Albi Stadium

1971 Pacific-8 Conference football standings
	Conf.					Overall
Team	W		L		T	W		L		T
No. 10 Stanford $	6	–	1	–	0	9	–	3	–	0
No. 20 USC	3	–	2	–	1	6	–	4	–	1
No. 19 Washington	4	–	3	–	0	8	–	3	–	0
California	4	–	3	–	0	6	–	5	–	0
Oregon State	3	–	3	–	0	5	–	6	–	0
Oregon	2	–	4	–	0	5	–	6	–	0
Washington State	2	–	5	–	0	4	–	7	–	0
UCLA	1	–	4	–	1	2	–	7	–	1
$ – Conference champion; Rankings from AP Poll

The 1971 Washington State Cougars football team was an American football team that represented Washington State University in the Pacific-8 Conference (Pac-8) during the 1971 NCAA University Division football season. Led by fourth-year head coach Jim Sweeney, they compiled a 4–7 record (2–5 in Pac-8, seventh), and were outscored 286 to 246.

The team's statistical leaders included junior quarterback Ty Payne with 1,206 passing yards, senior running back Bernard Jackson with 1,189 rushing yards, and wide receiver Ike Nelson with 349 receiving yards.

The Cougars defeated tenth-ranked Stanford, the defending and future Rose Bowl champions, in Palo Alto on October 23, but lost their third straight Apple Cup. Washington State did not play the Battle of the Palouse in 1971, and neighbor Idaho had their best season to date, winning eight consecutive games.

Due to the fire damage to Rogers Field in Pullman in April 1970, the Cougars played their entire home schedule eighty miles (130 km) north of campus at Joe Albi Stadium in Spokane in 1970 and 1971.

== Schedule ==
Date	Time	Opponent	Site	Result	Attendance	Source
September 11	11:30 am	at Kansas*	Memorial Stadium; Lawrence, KS	L 0–34	37,750	
September 18	1:30 pm	Arizona*	Joe Albi Stadium; Spokane, WA	L 28–39	13,500	
September 25	11:30 am	at Minnesota*	Memorial Stadium; Minneapolis, MN	W 31–20	32,020	
October 2	12:30 pm	at Utah*	Ute Stadium; Salt Lake City, UT	W 34–12	15,008	
October 9	1:30 pm	UCLA	Joe Albi Stadium; Spokane, WA	L 21–34	30,500	
October 16	1:30 pm	California	Joe Albi Stadium; Spokane, WA	L 23–24	12,600	
October 23	1:31 pm	at No. 10 Stanford	Stanford Stadium; Stanford, CA	W 24–23	52,500	
October 30	1:30 pm	Oregon	Joe Albi Stadium; Spokane, WA	W 31–21	25,400	
November 6	1:30 pm	at No. 17 USC	Los Angeles Memorial Coliseum; Los Angeles, CA	L 20–30	57,432	
November 13	1:30 pm	at Oregon State	Parker Stadium; Corvallis, OR	L 14–21	20,385	
November 20	1:30 pm	at Washington	Husky Stadium; Seattle, WA (Apple Cup)	L 20–28	60,100	
*Non-conference game; Rankings from AP Poll released prior to the game; All times are in Pacific time

== Roster ==
1971 Washington State Cougars football team roster
Players
Coaches
Offense

Pos.	#	Name	Class
QB	15	Gary Bergan	Sr
SE	49	Fritz Brayton	So
OT	77	Buzz Brazeau	Sr
G	66	Steve Busch (C)	Sr
TE	80	Bob Engel	So
TE	89	Jim Forrest	Jr
G	67	Jim Giesa	Sr
FB	44	Ken Grandberry	So
G	62	Jim Gulledge	Sr
FB	35	Steve Hamilton	Jr
G	51	Mike Hill	So
C	50	John Hook	Sr
TB	26	Bernard Jackson	Sr
FL	41	Tony Lomax	Sr
FB	32	Ken Lyday (C)	Sr
G	61	Bill Moos	Jr
SE	42	Ike Nelson	Jr
QB	14	Ty Paine	Jr
TE	81	Mark Painter	Sr
SE	47	Bobby Redmond	So
SE	46	Don Transeth	Jr
OT	75	Tom Wickert	So
OT	76	Wallace Williams	Sr

Defense

Pos.	#	Name	Class
LB	63	Crosby Anderson	Sr
DT	72	Harold Bradford	Sr
DT	71	Greg Craighead	So
CB	29	Tyrone Daisy	Jr
SS	40	Nile DeCuire	Sr
LB	69	Dana Dogterom	Sr
FS	11	Chuck Hawthorne	Sr
FS	37	Eric Johnson	So
DE	85	Mike Johnson	Jr
DE	78	Brian Lange (C)	Sr
LB	38	Bob Leslie	Sr
CB	25	Ron Butler	Sr
DT	88	Dennis Mitchell	Jr
LB	39	Randy Pickering	Sr
LB	58	Tom Poe	So
DE	82	Jim Robinson	Jr
CB	24	Robin Sinclair	So
FS	22	Harry Thompson	Sr
LB	67	Clyde Warehime	So

Special teams

Pos.	#	Name	Class
P	12	Jim Dodd	Jr
K	3	Don Sweet	Sr

Head coach

- Jim Sweeney (4th year)

Coordinators/assistant coaches

- Sam Jankovich
- Jim Erkenbeck
- Bob Simpson
- Walt Cubley
- Leon Burtnett
- Joe Tiller
- Keith Lincoln

Legend

- (C) Team captain
- (S) Suspended
- (I) Ineligible
- Injured
- Redshirt

== All-conference ==
Four Washington State seniors were named to the All-Pacific-8 team: halfback Bernard Jackson, guard Steve Busch, cornerback Ron Mims, and placekicker Don Sweet. Busch was a repeat selection.

== NFL draft ==
Two Cougars were selected in the 1972 NFL draft

Player	Position	Round	Overall	Franchise
Bernard Jackson	DB/RB	4	81	Cincinnati Bengals
John Van Reenen	DE	14	351	San Diego Chargers
