= Jeff Siemon =

American football player (1950–2026)

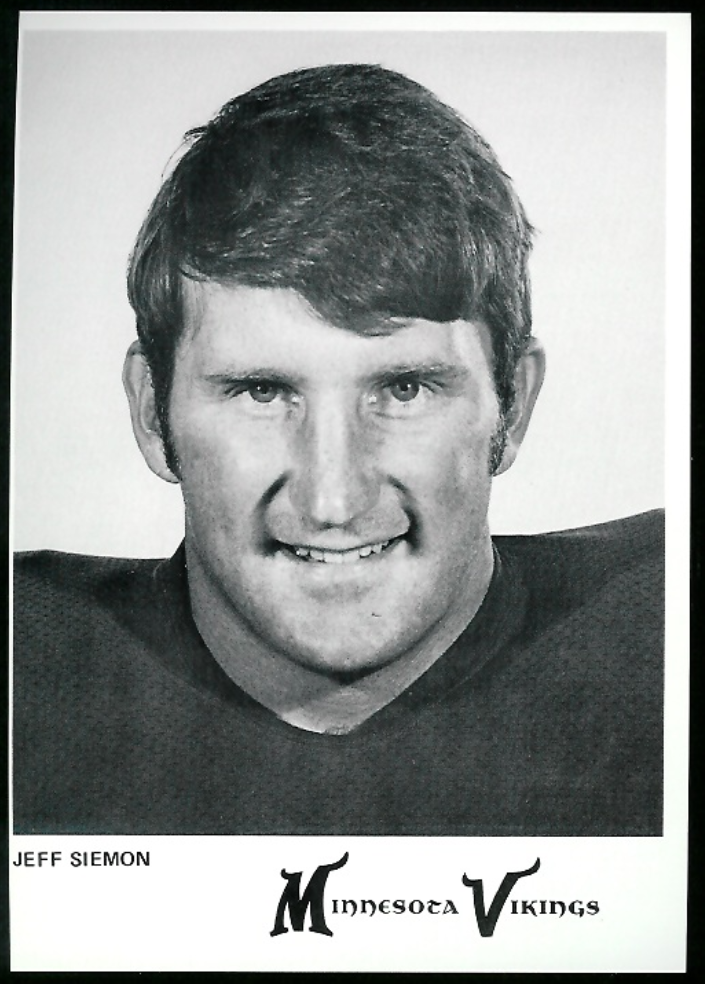
- Siemon in 1978

No. 50
- Position: Linebacker

Personal information
- Born: June 2, 1950; Rochester, Minnesota, U.S.
- Died: March 28, 2026 (aged 75)
- Listed height: 6 ft 2 in (1.88 m)
- Listed weight: 235 lb (107 kg)

Career information
- High school: Bakersfield (Bakersfield, California)
- College: Stanford (1969–1971)
- NFL draft: 1972: 1st round, 10th overall pick

Career history
- Minnesota Vikings (1972–1982)

Awards and highlights
- 4× Pro Bowl (1973, 1975–1977); 50 Greatest Vikings; Minnesota Vikings 25th Anniversary Team; Minnesota Vikings 40th Anniversary Team; Consensus All-American (1971); Pop Warner Trophy (1971); 2× First-team All-Pac-8 (1970, 1971)

Career NFL statistics
- Interceptions: 11
- Interception yards: 104
- Fumble recoveries: 11
- Sacks: 7
- Stats at Pro Football Reference
- College Football Hall of Fame

Jeffrey Glenn Siemon (June 2, 1950 – March 28, 2026) was an American professional football player who spent his entire 11-year career as a linebacker for the Minnesota Vikings of the National Football League (NFL). He played college football for the Stanford Indians and was inducted into the College Football Hall of Fame. He was a four-time Pro Bowl selection with the Vikings.

== Early life ==
Born in Rochester, Minnesota, Siemon grew up in Bakersfield, California, and graduated from Bakersfield High School in 1968, where he played quarterback, linebacker, tight end, and center.

== College career ==
Siemon graduated from Stanford University in 1972, where he starred as a middle linebacker on the Indians' famed "Thunder Chickens" defense, playing on two Rose Bowl-winning teams. He earned the Silver anniversary Dick Butkus award his senior year (1971) as the nation's top linebacker, and the Pop Warner Award as the top senior player on the West Coast. He was inducted to the College Football Hall of Fame in 2006. He was a member of Delta Tau Delta international fraternity.

== Professional career ==
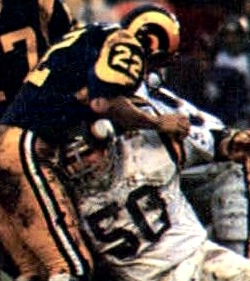
Siemon (50) with the Minnesota Vikings in 1977.

Siemon was the 10th overall selection of the 1972 NFL draft, taken by the Vikings with a pick acquired from the New England Patriots in the trade for Joe Kapp, the Vikings' starting quarterback in Super Bowl IV. Siemon played for the Vikings for 11 seasons, retiring after the strike-shortened 1982 campaign. During that time, he was the starting middle linebacker in four NFC championship games over the course of five years (1973–1977), winning three: 1973, 1974, and 1976, losing one: 1977, and three Super Bowls (VIII, IX, XI), all losses.

He was also a vital part of the Vikings' 1975 season of 12 wins and 2 losses, winning the NFC central division, third in the NFL in fewest points allowed (180 points, 12.9 points per game), but the team lost to the Dallas Cowboys in the first round of the playoffs. During the prime years, he teamed up with excellent outside linebackers, such as Matt Blair, Roy Winston, and Wally Hilgenberg.

For his speed, quickness, and savvy, he was chosen to play in four Pro Bowls.

== Later life ==
After his NFL career, Siemon graduated from the Simon Greenleaf School of Law (M.A. in Christian Apologetics, 1984). Subsequently, he began and continued his work until his death as the Minnesota Search Ministries Division Director.

== Personal life and death ==
Siemon and his wife, Dawn, had four grown children and lived in Edina, Minnesota.

On March 28, 2026, the Minnesota Vikings released a statement confirming that Siemon had died that day at the age of 75.
