= Bernard Jackson (defensive back) =

American football player (1950–1997)

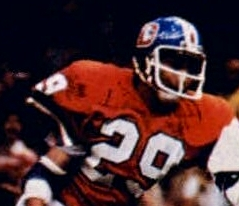
- Jackson with the Denver Broncos in Super Bowl XII

No. 23, 29, 26
- Positions: Safety, cornerback

Personal information
- Born: August 24, 1950; Washington, D.C., U.S.
- Died: May 26, 1997 (aged 46); Lompoc, California, U.S.
- Listed height: 6 ft 0 in (1.83 m)
- Listed weight: 178 lb (81 kg)

Career information
- High school: Susan Miller Dorsey (Los Angeles, California)
- College: Washington State (1970–71); Pierce College (1968–69)
- NFL draft: 1972: 4th round, 81st overall pick

Career history
- Cincinnati Bengals (1972−1976); Denver Broncos (1977−1980); San Diego Chargers (1980)

Awards and highlights
- First-team All-Pac-8 (1971)

Career NFL statistics
- Interceptions: 17
- Fumble recoveries: 8
- Return yards: 2,709
- Stats at Pro Football Reference

Bernard Frank Jackson (born August 24, 1950 – May 26, 1997) was an American professional football defensive back who played for three National Football League (NFL) teams. He was selected in the fourth round as the 81st overall pick in the 1972 NFL draft by the Cincinnati Bengals. After five years, he was traded to the Denver Broncos in March 1977 and started in Super Bowl XII.

== College career ==
As a collegiate player at Washington State in the Pac-8, Jackson was a running back and kick returner for head coach Jim Sweeney During his senior season in 1971, he rushed for 1,189 yards on 177 attempts (6.7 avg, 1st in Pac-8) and was named First-team All-Pac-8 and All-Coast. His 2,118 all-purpose yards in 1971–1,189 on the ground, 744 in kickoff returns and 185 receiving—remains the all-time WSU single-season record. He returned two kickoffs for TDs and also scored on a fake punt that season. He is a member of the WSU Athletics Hall of Fame.

A 1968 graduate of Dorsey High School in Los Angeles, he had dreamed of playing for the USC Trojans, but was just 160 pounds (73 kg) and began his college career at Pierce College in Los Angeles.

== Professional career ==
After five years with the Bengals, Jackson was traded to the Denver Broncos in March 1977, and that season the Broncos won the AFC title and advanced to Super Bowl XII. Jackson started the game, but the Broncos lost to the Dallas Cowboys 27–10.

Injured with a muscle bruise for much of the 1980 season, he was waived in late November and picked up by the San Diego Chargers.

== Death ==
Jackson died of liver cancer at age 46 in Lompoc, California, and is buried at its Evergreen Cemetery.
