= John Ralston (American football) =

American football player, coach, and executive (1927–2019)

Biographical details
- Born: April 26, 1927; Oakland, California, U.S.
- Died: September 14, 2019 (aged 92); Sunnyvale, California, U.S.

Playing career
- 1948–1950: California
- Position: Linebacker

Coaching career (HC unless noted)
- 1953–1954: San Lorenzo HS (CA)
- 1956–1958: California (assistant)
- 1959–1962: Utah State
- 1963–1971: Stanford
- 1972–1976: Denver Broncos
- 1978: Philadelphia Eagles (OC)
- 1981: Toronto Argonauts (assistant)
- 1983–1984: Oakland Invaders
- 1993–1996: San Jose State

Administrative career (AD unless noted)
- 1979–1980: San Francisco 49ers (VP of admin.)
- 1997–2013: San Jose State (special asst.)

Head coaching record
- Overall: 97–81–4 (college); 34–33–3 (NFL); 9–12 (USFL)
- Bowls: 2–2

Accomplishments and honors

Championships
- 2 Skyline (1960–1961); 2 AAWU/Pac-8 (1970–1971)

Awards
- Sporting News College Football COY (1970)
- College Football Hall of Fame; Inducted in 1992 (profile)

John R. Ralston (April 26, 1927 – September 14, 2019) was an American football player, coach, and sports executive. He served as the head football coach at Utah State University (1959–1962), Stanford University (1963–1971), and San Jose State University (1993–1996), compiling a career college football record of 97–81–4. Ralston also coached the Denver Broncos of the National Football League (NFL) from 1972 to 1976, amassing a record of 34–33–3, and the Oakland Invaders of the United States Football League (USFL) in 1983 and part of the 1984 season, tallying a mark of 9–12. He was inducted into the College Football Hall of Fame as a coach in 1992.

== Early life, education, and playing career ==
Born in Oakland, California, Ralston and his family moved to Norway, Michigan, when he was eight years old. On graduating from Norway High School in 1944, he went to the University of California, Berkeley and played linebacker there on two Rose Bowl teams before earning his physical education degree in 1951.

== Coaching career ==
Ralston began his coaching career in 1952 at San Lorenzo High School in San Lorenzo, California, just south of Oakland. He subsequently was an assistant coach at Mt. Diablo High School in Concord, California. in 1953 and 1954. He then spent three seasons as an assistant coach at Cal from 1955 to 1958. Ralston was then named head coach at Utah State University in 1959. In four years there, he compiled a 31–11–1 record and won two Skyline Conference championships. Ralston moved to Stanford University in 1963 and, over nine seasons, built a mark of 55–36–3. In his last two seasons, 1970–1971, Ralston's teams won two Pacific-8 titles and notched back-to-back Rose Bowl victories over Ohio State and Michigan, both of whom were undefeated coming into the Rose Bowl game. Under Ralston's tutelage, Stanford quarterback Jim Plunkett won the Heisman Trophy in 1970.

In 1972, Ralston departed the San Francisco Bay Area again, this time for the Rocky Mountains and the Denver Broncos. The Broncos finished with a 5–9 record in 1972. In 1973, a year which included the "Orange Monday" game played in front of a prime-time national television audience in which the Broncos came from behind to earn a tie on Jim Turner's 35-yard field goal, Ralston coached the team into first place with a 6–3–2 record. With their first winning season in franchise history under their belt and with the AFC West title on the line, the Broncos' season ended with a 21–17 loss to the Oakland Raiders. Ralston was the UPI's choice as AFC Coach of the Year after Denver achieved its first-ever winning season at 7–5–2. In 1974, Ralston coached the Broncos to a 7–6–1 record for their second consecutive winning season. In 1975 the Broncos finished with a 6–8 record, but the following year the team improved and finished with a 9–5 record. The record was not, however, good enough to qualify the Broncos for the playoffs. Having lost his GM duties in December, Ralston then resigned as coach in late January 1977. In five seasons with the Broncos, Ralston guided the team to winning seasons three times and an overall record of 34–33–3; despite this, he never went to the playoffs during his Bronco (and NFL head coaching) tenure. Red Miller, hired to replace Ralston, wound up coaching the Broncos to the playoffs in his rookie season that saw them go all the way to Super Bowl XII.

After leaving the Broncos, Ralston held several assistant coaching jobs which included the Philadelphia Eagles, the San Francisco 49ers, the Toronto Argonauts of the Canadian Football League, and as a head coach in the USFL with the Oakland Invaders. Ralston also coached in Europe. He was the head coach of the Dutch Lions, the national football team of the Netherlands. With the Lions, Ralston won the bronze medal in the European Championships in Helsinki, Finland in 1991. After being inducted to the College Football Hall of Fame in 1992, Ralston came out of retirement in 1993 to be head coach at San Jose State University. After the 1996 season, Ralston resigned from the position to become special assistant to athletic director Tom Brennan. Ralston later became special assistant to the football team, where he remained until the 2013 season. He died on September 14, 2019, at the age of 92.

== Head coaching record ==
=== College ===
Year	Team	Overall	Conference	Standing	Bowl/playoffs	Coaches^{#}	AP^{°}
Utah State Aggies (Skyline Conference) (1959–1961)
1959	Utah State	5–6	2–5	T–5th			
1960	Utah State	9–2	6–1	T–1st	L Sun		
1961	Utah State	9–1–1	5–0–1	T–1st	L Gotham	10	10
Utah State Aggies (NCAA University Division independent) (1962)
1962	Utah State	8–2					
Utah State:		31–11–1	13–6–1				
Stanford Indians (Athletic Association of Western Universities) (1963–1967)
1963	Stanford	3–7	1–4	6th			
1964	Stanford	5–5	3–4	5th			
1965	Stanford	6–3–1	2–3	T–5th			
1966	Stanford	5–5	1–4	8th			
1967	Stanford	5–5	3–4	T–4th			
Stanford Indians (Pacific-8 Conference) (1968–1971)
1968	Stanford	6–3–1	3–3–1	T–3rd		20	
1969	Stanford	7–2–1	5–1–1	T–2nd		14	19
1970	Stanford	9–3	6–1	1st	W Rose	10	8
1971	Stanford	9–3	6–1	1st	W Rose	16	10
Stanford:		55–36–3	30–25–2				
San Jose State Spartans (Big West Conference) (1993–1995)
1993	San Jose State	2–9	2–4	T–6th			
1994	San Jose State	3–8	3–3	T–5th			
1995	San Jose State	3–8	3–4	T–6th			
San Jose State Spartans (Western Athletic Conference) (1996)
1996	San Jose State	3–9	3–5	T–5th (Pacific)			
San Jose State:		11–34	11–26				
Total:		97–81–4					
National championship Conference title Conference division title or championship game berth
^{#}Rankings from final Coaches Poll.; ^{°}Rankings from final AP Poll.

=== NFL ===
Team	Year	Regular season					Postseason			
Team	Year	Won	Lost	Ties	Win %	Finish	Won	Lost	Win %	Result
DEN	1972	5	9	0	.357	3rd in AFC West	-	-	-	-
DEN	1973	7	5	2	.583	T–2nd in AFC West	-	-	-	-
DEN	1974	7	6	1	.536	2nd in AFC West	-	-	-	-
DEN	1975	6	8	0	.429	2nd in AFC West	-	-	-	-
DEN	1976	9	5	0	.643	2nd in AFC West	-	-	-	-
DEN Total		34	33	3	.507		0	0	-	
Total		34	33	3	.507		0	0		-
