= Don Bunce =

American football player and orthopedic surgeon (1949–2003)

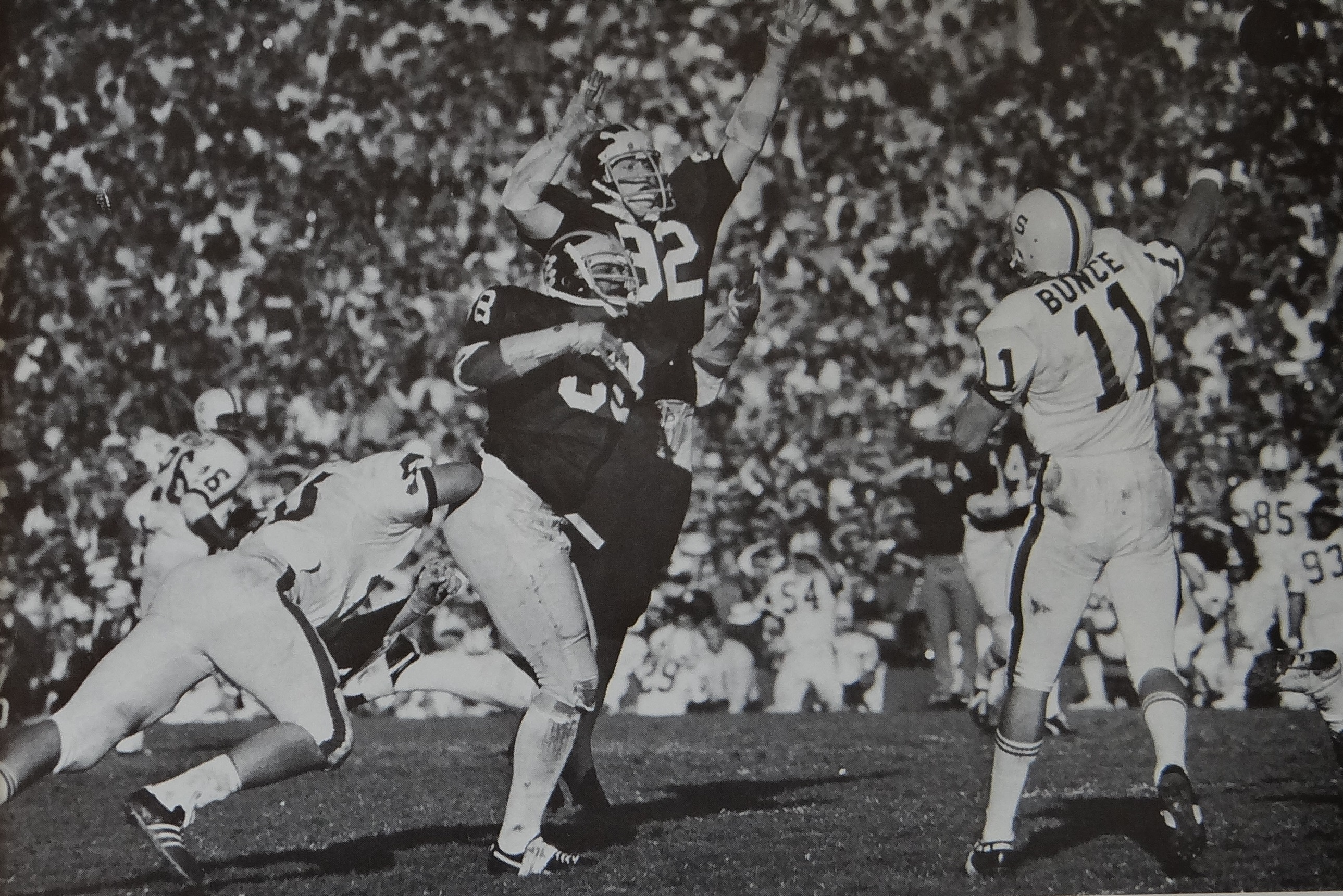
- Bunce passing in the 1972 Rose Bowl

No. 11
- Position: Quarterback

Personal information
- Born: January 17, 1949; Redwood City, California, U.S.
- Died: April 15, 2003 (aged 54); Santa Cruz, California, U.S.

Career information
- College: Stanford
- NFL draft: 1972: 12th round, 307th overall pick

Career history
- 1972: BC Lions

Awards and highlights
- First-team All-Pac-8 (1971); 1972 Rose Bowl MVP

Dr. Don Bunce (January 17, 1949 – April 15, 2003) was an American football quarterback and orthopedic surgeon.

== Early life ==
Born in Redwood City, California, Bunce graduated from Woodside High School in 1967 and attended nearby Stanford University in Palo Alto, where he played behind Jim Plunkett, the Heisman Trophy winner in 1970 and first selection in the 1971 NFL draft. Bunce became the starting quarterback as a fifth-year senior in 1971 and led the Indians to the Pac-8 championship and a spot in the Rose Bowl against favored and unbeaten Michigan on New Year's Day.

=== Rose Bowl ===
With the scored tied at ten and less than four minutes to play, Michigan's 46-yard field goal attempt was short and right, but Stanford opted to run it out of the end zone. Although he made it past the five-yard-line before retreating, Jim Ferguson was pushed back from the three and landed in the end zone; the nearest official awarded a controversial safety. After the free kick, Stanford stopped Michigan and forced a punt. Trailing by two points with 1:48 left from his own 22-yard-line, a sleep-deprived Bunce completed five of six passes, driving 64 yards in eight plays to the Michigan 14 to set up a game-winning field goal attempt with sixteen seconds left. From just inside the right hashmark, placekicker Rod Garcia split the uprights from 31 yards and Stanford won, 13−12. Bunce was named Rose Bowl most valuable player, after completing 24 of 44 attempts for 290 yards and no interceptions. Earlier in the week, he was also awarded the 1971 W.J. Voit Memorial Trophy as the outstanding football player on the Pacific Coast.

== Professional career ==
In the 1972 NFL draft, Bunce was selected in the twelfth round (307th overall) by the Washington Redskins. He opted to join the Canadian Football League, where he signed a three-year contract with the British Columbia Lions of Vancouver and planned to attend medical school at the University of British Columbia. He played one season in 1972, then left football and attended Stanford Medical School, where he received an M.D. degree in 1977 and went on to start a successful practice as an orthopedic surgeon in Palo Alto. He also served as team doctor for Stanford's football team from 1982 to 1992.

Bunce died of a heart attack at the age of 54 while vacationing near Santa Cruz.

== See also ==
- List of NCAA major college football yearly total offense leaders

== Video ==
- You Tube – 1972 Rose Bowl – NBC Sports telecast
