= Dave Dalby =

American football player (1950–2002)

No. 50
- Position: Center

Personal information
- Born: October 19, 1950; Alexandria, Minnesota, U.S.
- Died: August 30, 2002 (aged 51); Dana Point, California, U.S.
- Listed height: 6 ft 3 in (1.91 m)
- Listed weight: 247 lb (112 kg)

Career information
- High school: La Serna (Whittier, California)
- College: UCLA
- NFL draft: 1972: 4th round, 100th overall pick

Career history
- Oakland/Los Angeles Raiders (1972–1985)

Awards and highlights
- 3× Super Bowl champion (XI, XV, XVIII); Pro Bowl (1977); Second-team All-American (1971); 2× First-team All-Pac-8 (1970, 1971)

Career NFL statistics
- Games played: 205
- Games started: 135
- Stats at Pro Football Reference

David Merle Dalby (October 19, 1950 – August 30, 2002) was an American professional football player who was a center for his entire 14-year career with the Oakland/Los Angeles Raiders of the National Football League (NFL). He played college football for the UCLA Bruins.

== Early life ==
Dalby was a star linemen at center and defensive end, who led his high school football team, the La Serna Lancers of Whittier, California, to the California Scholastic Federation AAA football championship in 1967. An all-around athlete in high school, Dalby also played basketball and baseball at La Serna and graduated in 1968.

Dalby played college football nearby at the University of California, Los Angeles (UCLA), where he became part of their All-Century team as center, and is a member of the UCLA Hall of Fame. He also majored in geography while at UCLA.

== Professional career ==
Dalby was the 100th overall pick of the 1972 NFL draft, selected in the fourth round by the Oakland Raiders. He played fourteen seasons in the NFL, all with the Raiders (1972–1985) and did not miss a single game.

In his fourth year in 1975, Dalby replaced hall of famer Jim Otto as the starting center, who retired after the previous season. He became only the second starting center in franchise history, as Otto had been the starter since the team's inception in 1960. For the next decade, Dalby was a part of sterling offensive lines which culminated in three Raider Super Bowl victories (XI, XV, XVIII). During that 1975–1985 window, the Raiders reached the playoffs eight times (1975–1977, 1980, 1982–1985).

During his eleven seasons as a starter, Dalby played next to hall of famer Gene Upshaw, Curt Marsh, and Charley Hannah at left guard with George Buehler and Mickey Marvin at right guard. He was selected to the Pro Bowl once, after the 1977 season. After his retirement, he was replaced as the starting center in 1986 by Don Mosebar.

== Death ==
Dalby died in a car accident on August 30, 2002, at 51, when his van hit a tree.
