= 1971 Stanford Indians football team =

American college football season

1971 Stanford Indians football

Pac-8 champion Rose Bowl champion

Rose Bowl, W 13–12 vs. Michigan
- Conference: Pacific-8 Conference

Ranking
- Coaches: No. 16
- AP: No. 10
- Record: 9–3 (6–1 Pac-8)
- Head coach: John Ralston (9th season)
- Offensive coordinator: Mike White
- Defensive coordinator: Bob Gambold
- Home stadium: Stanford Stadium

1971 Pacific-8 Conference football standings
	Conf.					Overall
Team	W		L		T	W		L		T
No. 10 Stanford $	6	–	1	–	0	9	–	3	–	0
No. 20 USC	3	–	2	–	1	6	–	4	–	1
No. 19 Washington	4	–	3	–	0	8	–	3	–	0
California	4	–	3	–	0	6	–	5	–	0
Oregon State	3	–	3	–	0	5	–	6	–	0
Oregon	2	–	4	–	0	5	–	6	–	0
Washington State	2	–	5	–	0	4	–	7	–	0
UCLA	1	–	4	–	1	2	–	7	–	1
$ – Conference champion; Rankings from AP Poll

The 1971 Stanford Indians football team represented Stanford University during the 1971 NCAA University Division football season. Led by ninth-year head coach John Ralston, the Indians were 8–3 in the regular season and repeated as Pacific-8 Conference champions at 6–1.

The previous season, the Indians won the Pac-8 title and upset undefeated Ohio State in the Rose Bowl behind Heisman Trophy-winning quarterback Jim Plunkett, the first overall pick in the 1971 NFL draft.

With the core of the "Thunder Chickens" defense returning, led by Jeff Siemon and Pete Lazetich, and an offense under the steady leadership of fifth-year senior quarterback Don Bunce, the Indians defended the conference title and upset fourth-ranked Michigan in the Rose Bowl.

Shortly after their New Year's Day victory, Ralston resigned to become head coach and general manager of the Denver Broncos in the National Football League. A few weeks later, offensive coordinator Mike White was hired as head coach at rival California, his alma mater, and Stanford promoted defensive assistant Jack Christiansen to head coach.

This was the final season with the "Indians" nickname, which was changed to "Cardinals" for 1972, and reduced to the singular "Cardinal" in 1982.

== Schedule ==
Date	Time	Opponent	Rank	Site	TV	Result	Attendance	Source
September 11	11:30 a.m.	at Missouri*	No. 19	Faurot Field; Columbia, MO		W 19–0	53,032	
September 18	11:00 a.m.	at Army*	No. 13	Michie Stadium; West Point, NY		W 38–3	42,148	
September 25	2:00 p.m.	Oregon	No. 13	Stanford Stadium; Stanford, CA		W 38–17	55,000	
October 2	1:32 p.m.	No. 19 Duke*	No. 10	Stanford Stadium; Stanford, CA		L 3–9	61,000	
October 9	1:30 p.m.	at No. 11 Washington	No. 19	Husky Stadium; Seattle WA		W 17–6	60,777	
October 16	7:30 p.m.	at USC	No. 15	Los Angeles Memorial Coliseum; Los Angeles, CA (rivalry)		W 33–18	65,375	
October 23	1:31 p.m.	Washington State	No. 10	Stanford Stadium; Stanford, CA		L 23–24	52,500	
October 30	1:30 p.m.	at Oregon State	No. 17	Parker Stadium; Corvallis, OR		W 31–24	29,230	
November 6	1:35 p.m.	UCLA	No. 12	Stanford Stadium; Stanford, CA		W 20–9	61,000	
November 13	1:35 p.m.	San Jose State*	No. 10	Stanford Stadium; Stanford, CA (rivalry)		L 12–13	41,000	
November 20	1:35 p.m.	California	No. 18	Stanford Stadium; Stanford, CA (Big Game)		W 14–0	86,000	
January 1, 1972		vs. No. 4 Michigan*	No. 16	Rose Bowl; Pasadena, CA (Rose Bowl)	NBC	W 13–12	103,154	
*Non-conference game; Rankings from AP Poll released prior to the game; All times are in Pacific time

== Roster ==
1971 Stanford Cardinal football team roster
Players
Coaches
Offense

Pos.	#	Name	Class
RB	33	Jackie Brown	Sr
QB	13	Don Bunce	RSr
G	66	Lee Fair	Jr
G	63	Younger Klippert	Jr
OT	75	Bill Meyers	Sr
SE	45	Miles Moore	Jr
TE	84	Bill Scott	Jr
OT	74	Tim Shallich	Sr
C	58	Dennis Sheehan	Sr
FB	38	Hillary Shockley	Sr
FL	26	John Winesberry	So

Defense

Pos.	#	Name	Class
FS	29	Benny Barnes	Sr
DL	73	Larry Butler	Sr
DT	93	Roger Cowan	Jr
DB	24	Jim Ferguson	So
DE	78	Pete Lazetich	Sr
CB	21	Charles McCloud	Jr
LB	10	Pat Moore	Jr
S	36	Randy Poltl	So
CB	42	Tim Robnett	Sr
DE	91	Greg Sampson	Sr
MLB	92	Jeff Siemon	Sr
LB	50	Mike Simone	Sr

Special teams

Pos.	#	Name	Class
PK	14	Rod Garcia	So
P	25	Steve Murray	Jr

Head coach

- John Ralston (8th year)

Coordinators/assistant coaches

- Mike White – (OC)
- Bob Gambold – (DC)
- Bill Dickey – (OL)
- Max McCartney – (DL)
- Jack Christiansen – (DB)
- Roger Theder – (QB-Rec)
- Dave Currey – (RB)

Legend

- (C) Team captain
- (S) Suspended
- (I) Ineligible
- Injured
- Redshirt

== NFL draft ==
Six Stanford players were selected in the 1972 NFL draft

Player	Position	Round	Overall	Franchise
Greg Sampson	Defensive end	1	6	Houston Oilers
Jeff Siemon	Linebacker	1	10	Minnesota Vikings
Pete Lazetich	Defensive end	2	36	San Diego Chargers
Jackie Brown	Running back	8	202	Oakland Raiders
Don Bunce	Quarterback	12	307	Washington Redskins
Larry Butler	Linebacker	16	406	Atlanta Falcons
