= Tom Drougas =

American football player (born 1949)

No. 74, 76, 78
- Position: Offensive tackle

Personal information
- Born: December 25, 1949 (age 76); Portland, Oregon, U.S.
- Listed height: 6 ft 4 in (1.93 m)
- Listed weight: 257 lb (117 kg)

Career information
- High school: Sunset (Portland)
- College: Oregon
- NFL draft: 1972: 1st round, 22nd overall pick

Career history
- Baltimore Colts (1972–1973); Denver Broncos (1974); Kansas City Chiefs (1974); Miami Dolphins (1975–1976)

Awards and highlights
- First-team All-Pac-8 (1971)

Career NFL statistics
- Games played: 65
- Fumble recoveries: 1
- Stats at Pro Football Reference

Thomas Christopher Drougas Jr. (born December 25, 1949) is an American former professional football player who was an offensive tackle in the National Football League (NFL) in the 1970s. He played college football for the Oregon Ducks.

He played high school football at Sunset High School in Beaverton, Oregon and played offensive lineman for the University of Oregon, becoming a first-team All-American selection in 1971, as the leading blocker for the Ducks’ high-powered offense that featured the likes of quarterback Dan Fouts, receiver Bob Newland, and running back Bobby Moore (Ahmad Rashad). He was selected by the Baltimore Colts with the 22nd overall pick in the first round of the 1972 NFL draft. He later played for the Denver Broncos, the Kansas City Chiefs, and the Miami Dolphins before retiring in 1976.
