= Jim Sweeney (American football, born 1929) =

American football player and coach (1929–2013)

Biographical details
- Born: September 1, 1929; Butte, Montana, U.S.
- Died: February 8, 2013 (aged 83); Fresno, California, U.S.
- Education: University of Portland (1951)

Playing career
- 1947–1949: Portland
- Position: End

Coaching career (HC unless noted)
- 1950: Portland Columbia HS (OR) (assistant)
- 1951: Butte Central Catholic HS (MT) (assistant)
- 1952–1955: Butte Central Catholic HS (MT)
- 1956–1959: Kalispell Flathead HS (MT)
- 1960–1962: Montana State (assistant)
- 1963–1967: Montana State
- 1968–1975: Washington State
- 1976–1977: Fresno State
- 1978: Oakland Raiders (assistant)
- 1979: St. Louis Cardinals (assistant)
- 1980–1996: Fresno State

Head coaching record
- Overall: 201–153–4 (college)
- Bowls: 6–3

Accomplishments and honors

Championships
- 3 Big Sky (1964, 1966–1967); 6 PCAA/Big West (1977, 1982, 1985, 1988–1989, 1991); 2 WAC (1992–1993)

James Joseph Sweeney (September 1, 1929 – February 8, 2013) was an American college football coach who was the head coach at Montana State University (1963–1967), Washington State University (1968–1975), and California State University, Fresno (1976–1977, 1980–1996), compiling a career college football record of 201–153–4 (.567). Sweeney's 144 wins at Fresno State are the most in the program's history. He was also an assistant coach in the National Football League (NFL). He played in college as an end for the Portland Pilots.

== Early years ==
Born in Butte, Montana, Sweeney was the youngest of seven children of Will and Kate Sweeney; his father was a hard-rock miner who emigrated from Ireland. As a youth in Butte, he was a top pitcher and outfielder in baseball, and graduated from Butte Central Catholic High School in 1947.

Sweeney played college football as an end at the University of Portland in Oregon, and graduated in 1951. After his junior year, the school dropped football as an intercollegiate sport, and Sweeney spent his senior season of 1950 as a high school coach at Columbia High School in Portland.

== Coaching career ==
Following graduation, Sweeney returned to Montana and was a high school assistant at his alma mater, Butte Central, for a season. He was its head coach from 1952 to 1955, then at Flathead High School in Kalispell from 1956 to 1959. Sweeney moved up to the college ranks in 1960 as an assistant coach at Montana State in Bozeman under Herb Agocs, and was promoted to head coach in 1963. He compiled a 31–20 (.608) record and three Big Sky Conference championships in his five seasons with the Bobcats, where one of his starting quarterbacks was Dennis Erickson. Sweeney's salary at MSU in 1967 was $15,000.

At Montana State, Sweeney is credited with convincing Jan Stenerud, a Norwegian on a ski jumping scholarship (three-time Big Sky champion), to go out for the football team as a kicker. Stenerud went on to become the first "pure" kicker inducted into the Pro Football Hall of Fame.

After his success in Bozeman, Sweeney moved up to the Pac-8 Conference at Washington State in Pullman, where he started with a one-year contract at $20,000 in 1968. He had only one winning season (1972) and compiled a 26–59–1 (.308) record in eight seasons. His team's most noteworthy accomplishment was the defeat of Rose Bowl-bound Stanford in 1971 to garner him NCAA District 8 Coach of the Year honors. One of his notable hires in Pullman was WSU alumnus Jack Elway, father of future hall of fame quarterback John Elway. After a disappointing conclusion to the 1975 season (winless in conference), Sweeney resigned at WSU a week after the season ended.

Promptly hired at Fresno State, Sweeney led the Bulldogs for two seasons before becoming a National Football League (NFL) assistant for two years. He spent the 1978 season with the Oakland Raiders in John Madden's final season, and the 1979 season with the St. Louis Cardinals under Bud Wilkinson, who was fired before the season's end. Sweeney returned to Fresno State as head coach in December 1979 for 17 more seasons; he compiled a 144–74–3 (.658) record and eight conference championships (PCAA/Big West and WAC) in 19 seasons. Sweeney retired from coaching following the 1996 season with 201 wins in 32 seasons. He was most proud of the 1977 team (9–2), and credited them as the "stadium builders", because their success got the local community motivated to fund and construct Bulldog Stadium, which opened in 1980.

== Personal life ==
Sweeney was the father of nine children: Jim, Peggy, Sheila, Carol, Mary Lou (Dion), Daniel, Colline, Patty (Negrete), and Kevin Sweeney, whom he coached at Fresno State. His wife and mother of all his children, Lucille (Cile) Carollo Sweeney, was his high school sweetheart from Butte; she died at age 57 in 1988 from an intracranial hemorrhage. He later married June Sweeney and they resided in Fresno. Two of his grandsons played Pac-10 football: Nate Fellner at Washington and Kyle Negrete at USC. Sweeney's grandson, Beau, played at California before transferring in 2011.

Sweeney died in Fresno in 2013 at age 83. He and his wife had recently moved to a senior living home due to his failing health, which included a stay at St. Agnes Medical Center.

== Head coaching record ==
=== College ===
Year	Team	Overall	Conference	Standing	Bowl/playoffs	Coaches^{#}	AP^{°}
Montana State Bobcats (Big Sky Conference) (1963–1967)
1963	Montana State	6–3	2–1	2nd			
1964	Montana State	7–4	3–0	1st	W Camellia		
1965	Montana State	3–7	1–3	T–4th			
1966	Montana State	8–3	4–0	1st	L Camellia		
1967	Montana State	7–3	4–0	1st			
Montana State:		31–20	14–4				
Washington State Cougars (Pacific-8 Conference) (1968–1975)
1968	Washington State	3–6–1	1–3–1	7th			
1969	Washington State	1–9	0–7	8th			
1970	Washington State	1–10	0–7	8th			
1971	Washington State	4–7	2–5	7th			
1972	Washington State	7–4	4–3	T–3rd		T–17	19
1973	Washington State	5–6	4–3	4th			
1974	Washington State	2–9	1–6	7th			
1975	Washington State	3–8	0–7	8th			
Washington State:		26–59–1	12–41–1				
Fresno State Bulldogs (Pacific Coast Athletic Association) (1976–1977)
1976	Fresno State	6–5*	3–1	2nd			
1977	Fresno State	9–2	4–0	1st			
Fresno State Bulldogs (Pacific Coast Athletic Association / Big West Conference) (1980–1991)
1980	Fresno State	5–6	1–4	T–4th			
1981	Fresno State	5–6	2–3	T–3rd			
1982	Fresno State	11–1	6–0	1st	W California		
1983	Fresno State	6–5	2–4	6th			
1984	Fresno State	6–6	3–4	T–4th			
1985	Fresno State	11–0–1	7–0	1st	W California	16	
1986	Fresno State	9–2	6–1	2nd			
1987	Fresno State	6–5	4–3	T–2nd			
1988	Fresno State	10–2	7–0	1st	W California		
1989	Fresno State	11–1	7–0	1st	W California		
1990	Fresno State	8–2–1	5–1–1	T–2nd			
1991	Fresno State	10–2	6–1	1st	L California		
Fresno State Bulldogs (Western Athletic Conference) (1992–1996)
1992	Fresno State	9–4	6–2	T–1st	W Freedom	22	24
1993	Fresno State	8–4	6–2	T–1st	L Aloha		
1994	Fresno State	5–7–1	3–4–1	7th			
1995	Fresno State	5–7	2–6	T–7th			
1996	Fresno State	4–7	3–5	T–5th (Pacific)			
Fresno State:		144–74–3	83–41–2	*Includes forfeit by Louisiana–Lafayette			
Total:		201–153–4					
National championship Conference title Conference division title or championship game berth
^{#}Rankings from final Coaches Poll.; ^{°}Rankings from final AP Poll.

== See also ==
- List of college football career coaching wins leaders
