= 1971 Oregon State Beavers football team =

American college football season

1971 Oregon State Beavers football
- Conference: Pacific-8 Conference
- Record: 5–6 (3–3 Pac-8)
- Head coach: Dee Andros (7th season)
- Home stadium: Parker Stadium; Civic Stadium

1971 Pacific-8 Conference football standings
	Conf.					Overall
Team	W		L		T	W		L		T
No. 10 Stanford $	6	–	1	–	0	9	–	3	–	0
No. 20 USC	3	–	2	–	1	6	–	4	–	1
No. 19 Washington	4	–	3	–	0	8	–	3	–	0
California	4	–	3	–	0	6	–	5	–	0
Oregon State	3	–	3	–	0	5	–	6	–	0
Oregon	2	–	4	–	0	5	–	6	–	0
Washington State	2	–	5	–	0	4	–	7	–	0
UCLA	1	–	4	–	1	2	–	7	–	1
$ – Conference champion; Rankings from AP Poll

The 1971 Oregon State Beavers football team represented Oregon State University in the Pacific-8 Conference (Pac-8) during the 1971 NCAA University Division football season. In their seventh season under head coach Dee Andros, the Beavers compiled an overall record of 5–6 record with a mark of 3–3 conference play, placing fifth in the Pac-8, and were outscored 295 to 131. Oregon State played three home games on campus at Parker Stadium in Corvallis and one at Civic Stadium in Portland.

Oregon State defeated rival Oregon in the Civil War game for the eighth consecutive year.

This was the first of 28 consecutive losing seasons for the Beavers, and Oregon State did not win five games in a season again until 1998.

== Schedule ==
Date	Time	Opponent	Site	Result	Attendance	Source
September 11		at No. 18 Georgia*	Sanford Stadium; Athens, GA	L 25–56	50,709	
September 18		Iowa*	Parker Stadium; Corvallis, OR	W 33–19	24,092	
September 25		at Michigan State*	Spartan Stadium; East Lansing, MI	L 14–31	62,184	
October 2		at UCLA	Los Angeles Memorial Coliseum; Los Angeles, CA	W 34–17	33,345	
October 9	1:30 p.m.	at California	California Memorial Stadium; Berkeley, CA	L 27–30	33,000	
October 16		No. 11 Arizona State*	Civic Stadium; Portland, OR	W 24–18	30,233	
October 23		at Washington	Husky Stadium; Seattle, WA	L 14–38	57,900	
October 30	1:30 p.m.	No. 17 Stanford	Parker Stadium; Corvallis, OR	L 24–31	29,230	
November 6		at Arizona*	Arizona Stadium; Tucson, AZ	L 22–34	31,000	
November 13		Washington State	Parker Stadium; Corvallis, OR	W 21–14	20,385	
November 20		at Oregon	Autzen Stadium; Eugene, OR (Civil War)	W 30–29	43,000	
*Non-conference game; Rankings from AP Poll released prior to the game; All times are in Pacific time

== Personnel ==
1971 Oregon State Beavers football team roster
Players
Coaches
Offense

Pos.	#	Name	Class
RB		Bill Carlquist
RB		Mike Davenport
OL		Jim Davidson
WR		Dan Ellis
QB		Steve Endicott
WR		Steve Harlow
C		Erin Haynes
WR		Clark Hoss
QB		Jim Kilmartin
WR		Jeff Kolberg
RB		Mike Maestri
RB		Jeff McBurney
RB		Bobby McClarty
WR		Greg Mobley
OL		Terry Nimz
OL		Dave Nirenberg
RB		Dave Schilling
RB		Roger Smith
RB		Ray Taroli
OL		John Todd
OL		Jack Turnbull
OL		Chris Veit

Defense

Pos.	#	Name	Class
DB		Bill Bartley
DL		Steve Bielenberg
LB		Steve Brown
DL		Duane Defrees
DB		Dennis Draper
DB		Bruce Fry
DB		Dave Graham
DL		Tex Gschwandtner
DL		Fred Hauck
DB		Jim Lilly
DL		Jim Sherbert
LB		Butch Wicks
DL		Billy Winchester
DL		Scott Woods

Special teams

Pos.	#	Name	Class

Head coach

- Dee Andros

Coordinators/assistant coaches

Legend

- (C) Team captain
- (S) Suspended
- (I) Ineligible
- Injured
- Redshirt

== Game summaries ==
=== Oregon ===
Team	1	2	3	4	Total
• Oregon St	3	7	7	13	30
Oregon	7	7	0	15	29

- Date: November 20
- Location: Autzen Stadium, Eugene, OR
- Game attendance: 43,000

Scoring summary
1	6:20	OSU	Boston 41-yard field goal	OSU 3-0
1	0:02	ORE	Herd 9-yard run (Buettner kick)	ORE 7-3
2	12:50	ORE	Drake 42-yard punt return (Buettner kick)	ORE 14-3
2	7:59	OSU	Schilling 3-yard run (Boston kick)	ORE 14-10
3	10:53	OSU	Schilling 3-yard run (Boston kick)	OSU 17-14
4	11:41	ORE	Glass 7-yard pass from Fouts (Buettner kick)	ORE 21-17
4	9:51	OSU	Schilling 6-yard run (Boston kick)	OSU 24-21
4	7:16	ORE	Bradley 28-yard pass from Fouts (Winn to Specht pass)	ORE 29-24
4	1:40	OSU	Carlquist 6-yard run (pass failed)	OSU 30-29
