= Mike Simone =

American football player (born 1950)

No. 51
- Position: Linebacker

Personal information
- Born: May 20, 1950 (age 76); Ravenna, Ohio, U.S.
- Listed height: 6 ft 0 in (1.83 m)
- Listed weight: 210 lb (95 kg)

Career information
- High school: Ravenna, St. Anthony
- College: Stanford
- NFL draft: 1972: undrafted

Career history
- Denver Broncos (1972–1974)
- Stats at Pro Football Reference

Michael Anthony Simone (born May 20, 1950) is an American former professional football player who was a linebacker for the Denver Broncos of the National Football League (NFL). He played college football for the Stanford Cardinal.
