= Bob Christiansen =

American football player (born 1949)

No. 83
- Position: Tight End Wide Receiver

Personal information
- Born: May 8, 1949 (age 77); Marshalltown, Iowa, U.S.
- Listed height: 6 ft 4 in (1.93 m)
- Listed weight: 230 lb (104 kg)

Career information
- College: UCLA
- NFL draft: 1972: 5th round, 125th overall pick

Career history
- Buffalo Bills (1972); Portland Storm/Thunder (1974-1975)

Awards and highlights
- First-team All-Pac-8 (1971)

Career NFL statistics
- Games played: 4
- Stats at Pro Football Reference

Robert Scott Christiansen (born May 8, 1949) is an American former professional football player who was a defensive tackle in the National Football League (NFL). He played for the Buffalo Bills in 1972.

For the 1971 season playing college football for the UCLA Bruins, he was named to the all-conference first-team. He played for Reseda High School.
