= Apple Cup =

American college football rivalry

- Washington Huskies Washington State Cougars
- Sport: College football
- First meeting: November 29, 1900; Tie, 5–5
- Latest meeting: September 6, 2026; Washington, 24–10
- Next meeting: August 28, 2027 in Pullman
- Stadiums: Husky Stadium; Martin Stadium
- Trophy: Governor's Trophy (1934–c.1946); Apple Cup Trophy (since 1963)

Statistics
- Total meetings: 118
- All-time series: Washington leads, 78–34–6 (.686)
- Largest victory: Washington, 51–3 (2000)
- Longest win streak: Washington, 8 (1959–1966, 1974–1981)
- Current win streak: Washington, 2

The Apple Cup is an American college football rivalry game between the University of Washington Huskies and Washington State University Cougars, the two largest universities in the state of Washington. Both were members of the Pac-12 Conference until 2024.

First played in 1900, 126 years ago, the matchup was traditionally the final game of the regular season for both teams and generally took place on the Saturday preceding Thanksgiving. With the NCAA's extension of the regular season to twelve games in 2006, the game is often played at a later date. From 2011 to 2023, it was most commonly held on the Friday after Thanksgiving. As a non-conference game for the first time in 63 years, the 2024 edition was played early in the season, on September 14 at Lumen Field in Seattle.

Since 1946, the game has been held in odd years in Seattle at Husky Stadium (except 2011 and 2024, both at Lumen Field), while Washington State has hosted during even years at Rogers Field (1946, 1948, 1954) and Martin Stadium (since 1982) in Pullman, and Joe Albi Stadium in Spokane. The games in eastern Washington from 1935 to 1948, all in Pullman, were held in mid-October. The exception was in 1945, when two games were played: the first in Seattle in mid-October, and the second in Pullman in late November. Starting in 2024, Seattle is scheduled to host in even years and Pullman in odd years.

First awarded in 1963, the Apple Cup Trophy is presented to the winner by the state's governor at the conclusion of the game.

== Series history ==
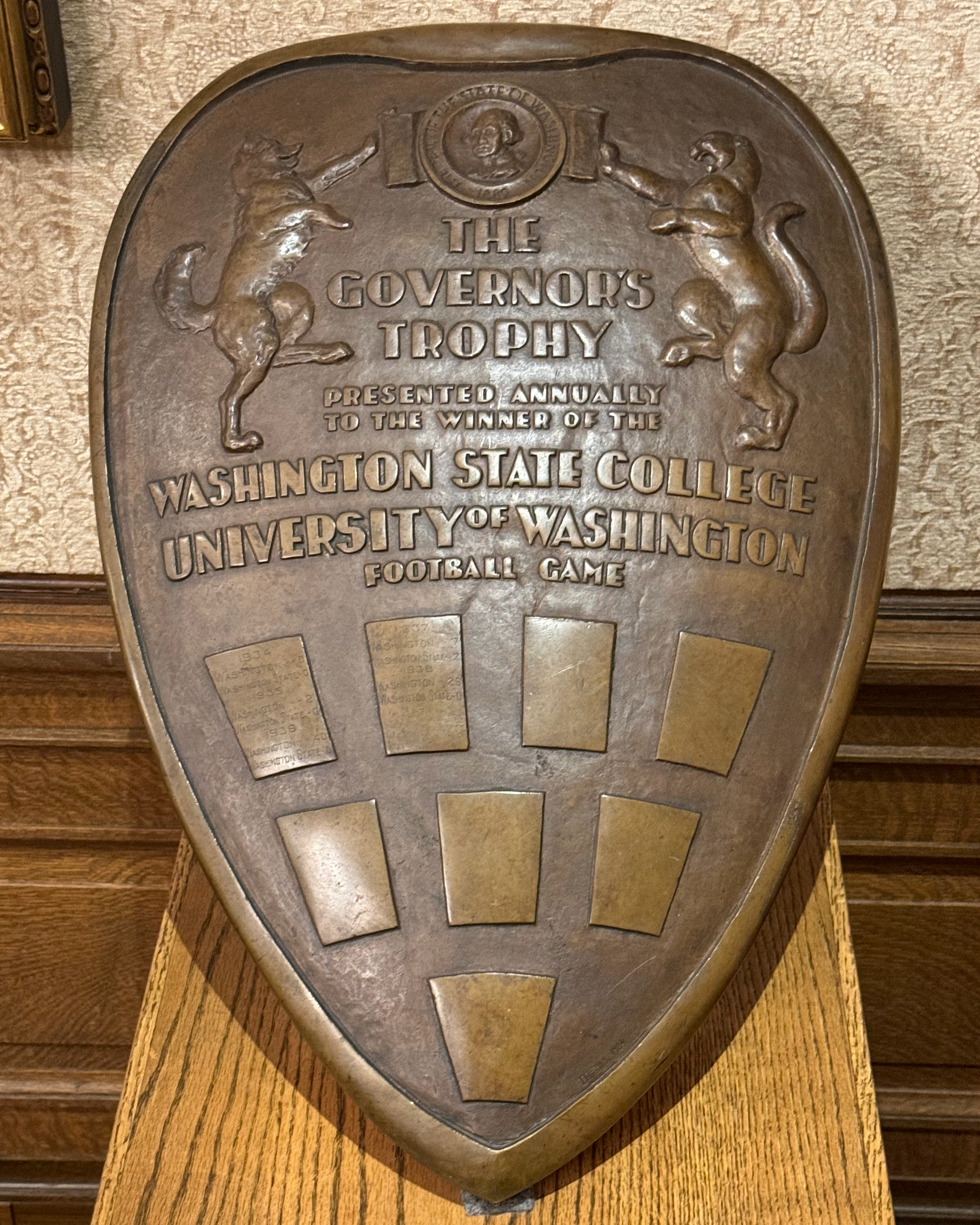
The Governor's Trophy, engraved with game results for 1934–1939, on display at the state capitol in Olympia

The rivalry between the two teams began in 1900, which their first game resulted in a 5–5 tie. The series has been played continuously since 1945, when there were two games, one in Seattle and one in Pullman. The 2020 game was cancelled due to the COVID-19 pandemic, as Washington State did not have enough eligible scholarship players available.

From 1950 through 1980 (except for 1954), the WSU home games in the series were played in Spokane at Joe Albi Stadium (Memorial Stadium until 1962). The Cougars won three of these fifteen games (1958, 1968, 1972). In 1910, the WSU home game was played at Recreation Park in Spokane, Washington.

Starting in 1934, the teams played for the Governor's Trophy. This bronze shield was made by sculptor Dudley Pratt and donated and awarded by Governor Clarence D. Martin, an alumnus of the University of Washington and the namesake of Pullman's Martin Stadium. The winners for the years 1934–1939 are etched on the shield. The trophy was awarded until at least 1946.

Location of campuses in Washington

In 1963 the Big Apple Trophy was donated to the competition by the Washington Apple Commission, emblematic of Washington's national reputation as a major producer of apples. This award was colloquially referred to as the Apple Cup, which later came to metonymically refer to the game itself. In 1989 the apple was recognized as Washington's state fruit during the state's centennial celebration.

When the college football regular season was lengthened from eleven to twelve games in 2006, there was a movement to change the date of the game from the Saturday before Thanksgiving to the weekend following, which would have allowed a bye week for both teams during the season. In 2006, both teams played twelve straight weeks without a bye, leaving the two teams noticeably fatigued. The 2007 game was played on the Saturday after Thanksgiving for the first time; but the 2008 game was returned to the Saturday before the holiday.

The media joked that the 2008 game won by the Cougars in Pullman was the "Crapple Cup" and "full of worms," because WSU (1–10) hosted winless UW (0–10). The game returned to the Saturday after Thanksgiving in 2009 in Seattle. The 2011 game in Seattle was moved to CenturyLink Field to allow an early start on the renovation of Husky Stadium.

== Game results ==
Washington victories	Washington State victories

No.	Date	Location	Winner	Score
1	November 29, 1900	Seattle	Tie	5–5
2	November 1, 1901	Pullman	Washington Agricultural	10–0
3	November 27, 1902	Seattle	Washington	16–0
4	October 30, 1903	Pullman	Washington	10–0
5	October 29, 1904	Seattle	Washington	12–6
6	November 21, 1907	Seattle	Washington State	10–5
7	November 7, 1908	Seattle	Tie	6–6
8	November 12, 1910	Spokane	Washington	16–0
9	November 30, 1911	Seattle	Washington	30–6
10	November 28, 1912	Seattle	Washington	19–0
11	November 27, 1913	Seattle	Washington	20–0
12	November 26, 1914	Seattle	Washington	45–0
13	November 29, 1917	Seattle	Washington State	14–0
14	November 15, 1919	Pullman	Washington	13–7
15	November 24, 1921	Seattle	Washington State	14–0
16	October 28, 1922	Pullman	Washington	16–13
17	November 24, 1923	Seattle	Washington	24–7
18	November 22, 1924	Seattle	Washington	14–0
19	October 31, 1925	Pullman	Washington	23–0
20	October 23, 1926	Seattle	Washington State	9–6
21	October 22, 1927	Seattle	Washington	14–0
22	November 29, 1928	Seattle	Washington	6–0
23	October 19, 1929	Pullman	Washington State	20–13
24	November 15, 1930	Seattle	Washington State	3–0
25	November 14, 1931	Seattle	Washington	12–0
26	November 12, 1932	Seattle	Tie	0–0
27	November 25, 1933	Pullman	Washington State	17–6
28	November 24, 1934	Seattle	Tie	0–0
29	October 19, 1935	Pullman	Washington	21–0
30	November 26, 1936	Seattle	#6 Washington	40–0
31	October 16, 1937	Pullman	Tie	7–7
32	November 26, 1938	Seattle	Washington	26–0
33	October 14, 1939	Pullman	Washington State	6–0
34	November 30, 1940	Seattle	#12 Washington	33–9
35	October 11, 1941	Pullman	Washington	23–13
36	November 28, 1942	Seattle	Tie	0–0
37	October 13, 1945	Seattle	Washington	6–0
38	November 24, 1945	Pullman	Washington State	7–0
39	October 12, 1946	Pullman	Washington	21–7
40	November 22, 1947	Seattle	Washington	20–0
41	October 16, 1948	Pullman	Washington State	10–0
42	November 19, 1949	Seattle	Washington	34–21
43	November 25, 1950	Spokane	#18 Washington	52–21
44	November 24, 1951	Seattle	#17 Washington State	27–25
45	November 29, 1952	Spokane	Washington	33–27
46	November 21, 1953	Seattle	Washington State	25–20
47	November 20, 1954	Pullman	Washington State	26–7
48	November 19, 1955	Seattle	Washington	27–7
49	November 24, 1956	Spokane	Washington	40–26
50	November 23, 1957	Seattle	Washington State	27–7
51	November 22, 1958	Spokane	Washington State	18–14
52	November 21, 1959	Seattle	#14 Washington	20–0
53	November 19, 1960	Spokane	#5 Washington	8–7
54	November 25, 1961	Seattle	Washington	21–17
55	November 24, 1962	Spokane	Washington	26–21
56	November 30, 1963	Seattle	Washington	16–0
57	November 21, 1964	Spokane	Washington	14–0
58	November 20, 1965	Seattle	Washington	27–9
59	November 19, 1966	Spokane	Washington	19–7
60	November 18, 1967	Seattle	Washington State	9–7

No.	Date	Location	Winner	Score
61	November 23, 1968	Spokane	Washington State	24–0
62	November 22, 1969	Seattle	Washington	30–21
63	November 21, 1970	Spokane	Washington	43–25
64	November 20, 1971	Seattle	Washington	28–20
65	November 18, 1972	Spokane	#20 Washington State	27–10
66	November 24, 1973	Seattle	Washington State	52–26
67	November 23, 1974	Spokane	Washington	24–17
68	November 22, 1975	Seattle	Washington	28–27
69	November 20, 1976	Spokane	Washington	51–32
70	November 19, 1977	Seattle	#19 Washington	35–15
71	November 25, 1978	Spokane	Washington	38–8
72	November 17, 1979	Seattle	#16 Washington	17–7
73	November 22, 1980	Spokane	#16 Washington	30–23
74	November 21, 1981	Seattle	#17 Washington	23–10
75	November 20, 1982	Pullman	Washington State	24–20
76	November 19, 1983	Seattle	Washington State	17–6
77	November 17, 1984	Pullman	#8 Washington	38–29
78	November 23, 1985	Seattle	Washington State	21–20
79	November 22, 1986	Pullman	#12 Washington	44–23
80	November 21, 1987	Seattle	Washington	34–19
81	November 19, 1988	Pullman	#19 Washington State	32–31
82	November 18, 1989	Seattle	Washington	20–9
83	November 17, 1990	Pullman	#10 Washington	55–10
84	November 23, 1991	Seattle	#2 Washington	56–21
85	November 21, 1992	Pullman	#25 Washington State	42–23
86	November 20, 1993	Seattle	Washington	26–3
87	November 19, 1994	Pullman	Washington State	23–6
88	November 18, 1995	Seattle	#22 Washington	33–30
89	November 23, 1996	Pullman	#12 Washington	31–24^{OT}
90	November 22, 1997	Seattle	#11 Washington State	41–35
91	November 21, 1998	Pullman	Washington	16–9
92	November 20, 1999	Seattle	Washington	24–14
93	November 18, 2000	Pullman	#6 Washington	51–3
94	November 17, 2001	Seattle	#16 Washington	26–14
95	November 23, 2002	Pullman	Washington	29–26^{3OT}
96	November 22, 2003	Seattle	Washington	27–19
97	November 20, 2004	Pullman	Washington State	28–25
98	November 19, 2005	Seattle	Washington State	26–22
99	November 18, 2006	Pullman	Washington	35–32
100	November 24, 2007	Seattle	Washington State	42–35
101	November 22, 2008	Pullman	Washington State	16–13^{2OT}
102	November 28, 2009	Seattle	Washington	30–0
103	December 4, 2010	Pullman	Washington	35–28
104	November 26, 2011	Seattle^	Washington	38–21
105	November 23, 2012	Pullman	Washington State	31–28^{OT}
106	November 29, 2013	Seattle	Washington	27–17
107	November 29, 2014	Pullman	Washington	31–13
108	November 27, 2015	Seattle	Washington	45–10
109	November 25, 2016	Pullman	#6 Washington	45–17
110	November 25, 2017	Seattle	#15 Washington	41–14
111	November 23, 2018	Pullman	#16 Washington	28–15
112	November 29, 2019	Seattle	Washington	31–13
113	November 26, 2021	Seattle	Washington State	40–13
114	November 26, 2022	Pullman	#13 Washington	51–33
115	November 25, 2023	Seattle	#4 Washington	24–21
116	September 14, 2024	Seattle^^	Washington State	24–19
117	September 20, 2025	Pullman	Washington	59–24
118	September 6, 2026	Seattle	#17 Washington	24–10
Series: Washington leads 78–34–6

- Overtime was introduced for Division I-A (FBS) in 1996 and has occurred four times in the Apple Cup, all in Pullman. Each team has two overtime victories: UW in 1996 and 2002, WSU in 2008 and 2012.

^{OT} → Overtime (1996, 2012)
^{2OT} → Double Overtime (2008)
^{3OT} → Triple Overtime (2002)

- After a two-year hiatus in 1943 and 1944, two games were played in 1945.
- ^ The 2011 game was played at CenturyLink Field in Seattle to expedite the Husky Stadium renovation project.
- ^^ The 2024 game was played at Lumen Field in Seattle per a five-year agreement in response to NCAA conference realignment, where each school would host two games and one would be played at a neutral site.
- The 2020 game scheduled in Pullman was declared No Contest by the league due to Washington State not having the minimum number of scholarship players available for the game as a result of a positive football student-athlete COVID-19 cases.
- WSU was Washington Agricultural College before 1905, and then Washington State College from 1905 to 1959.

== Coaching records since 1945 ==
=== Washington ===
Head coach	Team	Games	Seasons	Wins	Losses	Ties	Pct.
Ralph Welch	Washington	4	1945–1947	3	1	0	.750
Howard Odell	Washington	5	1948–1952	2	3	0	.400
John Cherberg	Washington	3	1953–1955	1	2	0	.333
Darrell Royal	Washington	1	1956	1	0	0	1.000
Jim Owens	Washington	18	1957–1974	12	6	0	.667
Don James	Washington	18	1975–1992	13	5	0	.722
Jim Lambright	Washington	6	1993–1998	4	2	0	.667
Rick Neuheisel	Washington	4	1999–2002	4	0		1.000
Keith Gilbertson	Washington	2	2003–2004	1	1		.500
Tyrone Willingham	Washington	4	2005–2008	1	3		.250
Steve Sarkisian	Washington	5	2009–2013	4	1		.800
Chris Petersen	Washington	6	2014–2019	6	0		1.000
Bob Gregory (interim)	Washington	1	2021	0	1		.000
Kalen DeBoer	Washington	2	2022–2023	2	0		1.000
Jedd Fisch	Washington	3	2024–present	2	1		.667

=== Washington State ===
Head coach	Team	Games	Seasons	Wins	Losses	Ties	Pct.
Phil Sarboe	Washington State	6	1945–1949	2	4	0	.333
Forest Evashevski	Washington State	2	1950–1951	1	1	0	.500
Al Kircher	Washington State	4	1952–1955	2	2	0	.500
Jim Sutherland	Washington State	8	1956–1963	2	6	0	.250
Bert Clark	Washington State	4	1964–1967	1	3	0	.250
Jim Sweeney	Washington State	8	1968–1975	3	5	0	.375
Jackie Sherrill	Washington State	1	1976	0	1	0	.000
Warren Powers	Washington State	1	1977	0	1	0	.000
Jim Walden	Washington State	9	1978–1986	3	6	0	.333
Dennis Erickson	Washington State	2	1987–1988	1	1	0	.500
Mike Price	Washington State	14	1989–2002	3	11	0	.214
Bill Doba	Washington State	5	2003–2007	3	2		.600
Paul Wulff	Washington State	4	2008–2011	1	3		.250
Mike Leach	Washington State	8	2012–2019	1	7		.125
Jake Dickert	Washington State	4	2021–2024	2	2		.500
Jimmy Rogers	Washington State	1	2025	0	1		.000
Kirby Moore	Washington State	1	2026–present	0	1		.000

- Last tie was in 1942, overtime began in 1996 in Division I-A
- Two games were played in 1945
- Jimmy Lake (UW) and Nick Rolovich (WSU) both coached for the 2020 and 2021 seasons, but neither in an Apple Cup; the 2020 game was canceled amid the COVID-19 pandemic, and both were fired prior to the 2021 matchup

== See also ==
- List of NCAA college football rivalry games
- List of most-played college football series in NCAA Division I
- Washington–Washington State men's basketball rivalry
