= 1971 USC Trojans football team =

American college football season

1971 USC Trojans football
- Conference: Pacific-8 Conference

Ranking
- AP: No. 20
- Record: 6–4–1 (3–2–1 Pac-8)
- Head coach: John McKay (12th season)
- Captains: Willie Hall; John Vella
- Home stadium: Los Angeles Memorial Coliseum

1971 Pacific-8 Conference football standings
	Conf.					Overall
Team	W		L		T	W		L		T
No. 10 Stanford $	6	–	1	–	0	9	–	3	–	0
No. 20 USC	3	–	2	–	1	6	–	4	–	1
No. 19 Washington	4	–	3	–	0	8	–	3	–	0
California	4	–	3	–	0	6	–	5	–	0
Oregon State	3	–	3	–	0	5	–	6	–	0
Oregon	2	–	4	–	0	5	–	6	–	0
Washington State	2	–	5	–	0	4	–	7	–	0
UCLA	1	–	4	–	1	2	–	7	–	1
$ – Conference champion; Rankings from AP Poll

The 1971 USC Trojans football team represented the University of Southern California (USC) in the 1971 NCAA University Division football season. In their 12th year under head coach John McKay, the Trojans compiled a 6–4–1 record (3–2–1 against conference opponents), finished in second place in the Pacific-8 Conference (Pac-8), and outscored their opponents by a combined total of 229 to 164. The team was ranked #20 in the final AP Poll.

Jim Jones led the team in passing, completing 89 of 161 passes for 995 yards with seven touchdowns and ten interceptions. Lou Harris led the team in rushing with 167 carries for 801 yards and four touchdowns. Edesel Garrison led the team in receiving with 25 catches for 475 yards and five touchdowns.

== Schedule ==
Date	Time	Opponent	Rank	Site	Result	Attendance	Source
September 10		No. 16 Alabama*	No. 5	Los Angeles Memorial Coliseum; Los Angeles, CA	L 10–17	67,781	
September 18		at Rice*	No. 17	Rice Stadium; Houston, TX	W 24–0	22,000	
September 25		Illinois*	No. 16	Los Angeles Memorial Coliseum; Los Angeles, CA	W 28–0	49,390	
October 2		at No. 8 Oklahoma*	No. 17	Oklahoma Memorial Stadium; Norman, OK	L 20–33	61,826	
October 9		Oregon		Los Angeles Memorial Coliseum; Los Angeles, CA	L 23–28	50,111	
October 16	7:30 p.m.	No. 15 Stanford		Los Angeles Memorial Coliseum; Los Angeles, CA (rivalry)	L 18–33	65,375	
October 23		at No. 6 Notre Dame*		Notre Dame Stadium; Notre Dame, IN (rivalry)	W 28–14	59,075	
October 30	1:31 p.m.	at California	No. 20	California Memorial Stadium; Berkeley, CA	W 28–0	54,000	
November 6		Washington State^{†}	No. 17	Los Angeles Memorial Coliseum; Los Angeles, CA	W 30–20	57,432	
November 13		at No. 19 Washington	No. 15	Husky Stadium; Seattle, WA	W 13–12	59,800	
November 20		UCLA	No. 15	Los Angeles Memorial Coliseum; Los Angeles, CA (Victory Bell)	T 7–7	68,426	
*Non-conference game; ^{†}Homecoming; Rankings from AP Poll released prior to the game; All times are in Pacific time

== Game summaries ==
=== At Notre Dame ===
Team	1	2	3	4	Total
• USC	14	14	0	0	28
Notre Dame	7	0	7	0	14

- Date: October 23
- Location: Notre Dame Stadium • Notre Dame, Indiana
- Game start: 1:30 p.m. EST
- Game attendance: 59,075
- Referee: Jerry Markbreit

Scoring summary
1	USC	Garrison 31-yard pass from Jones (Rae kick)	USC 7-0
1	ND	Huff 1-yard run (Thomas kick)	Tie 7-7
1	USC	Garrison 24-yard pass from Rae (Rae kick)	USC 14-7
2	USC	Cunningham 1-yard run (Rae kick)	USC 21-7
2	USC	Dyer 53-yard interception return (Rae kick)	USC 28-7
3	ND	Cieszkowski 4-yard run (Thomas kick)	USC 28-14

=== At Washington ===
#15 USC Trojans (5–4) at #19 Washington Huskies (7–2)

Quarter	1	2	3	4	Total
USC	3	0	7	3	13
Washington	6	0	0	6	12

at Husky Stadium, Seattle, Washington

- Date: November 13
- Game attendance: 59,800

Game information

First quarter

- USC – Mike Rae 34-yard field goal. USC 3–0.
- WASH – John Brady 21-yard pass from Sonny Sixkiller (kick failed). Washington 6–3. Drive: 2 plays, 31 yards.

Second quarter

- No scoring

Third quarter

- USC – Jimmy Jones 7-yard run (Mike Rae kick). USC 10–6.

Fourth quarter

- WASH – Pete Taggares 2-yard run (run failed). Washington 12–10. Drive: 48 yards.
- USC – Mike Rae 28-yard field goal. USC 13–12.

Jimmy Jones sets school record for total career touchdowns (42), breaking the old mark held by Mort Kaer.

== Personnel ==
1971 USC Trojans football team roster
Players
Coaches
Offense

Pos.	#	Name	Class
OT	77	Pete Adams	Jr
OL		Dave Brown
RB	39	Sam Cunningham	Jr
OL		Allen Gallaher
WR		Edsel Garrison
OL		Allan Graf
RB		Lou Harris
RB		Charles Hinton
RB		Bill Holland
QB	8	Jimmy Jones	Sr
RB		Manfred Moore
WR		Mike Morgan
QB, K	6	Mike Rae	Jr
OL		Steve Riley
OL		Mike Ryan
OL		Bob Shaputis
WR		Lynn Swann
TE		Chris Vella
OT	75	John Vella (C)	Sr
RB		Ray Washmera
TE	89	Charle Young	Jr

Defense

Pos.	#	Name	Class
LB		Charles Anthony
DB		Bruce Dyer
LB		Bob Eriksen
DB		Steve Fate
DL		George Follett
DE	94	John Grant	Jr
LB		Willie Hall (C)
DT		Greg Marderian
DL		Mike McGirr
LB		John Papadakis
DB		Artimus Parker
DL		John Skiles
DB	46	Skip Thomas	Sr
DL		Scott Weber

Special teams

Pos.	#	Name	Class
P		Dave Boulware

Head coach

- John McKay

Coordinators/assistant coaches

- Craig Fertig
- Wayne Fontes

Legend

- (C) Team captain
- (S) Suspended
- (I) Ineligible
- Injured
- Redshirt
