= 1971 Washington Huskies football team =

American college football season

1971 Washington Huskies football
- Conference: Pacific-8 Conference

Ranking
- AP: No. 19
- Record: 8–3 (4–3 Pac-8)
- Head coach: Jim Owens (15th season)
- Captains: Steve Anderson; Rick Huget; Al Kravitz; Sonny Sixkiller
- Home stadium: Husky Stadium

1971 Pacific-8 Conference football standings
	Conf.					Overall
Team	W		L		T	W		L		T
No. 10 Stanford $	6	–	1	–	0	9	–	3	–	0
No. 20 USC	3	–	2	–	1	6	–	4	–	1
No. 19 Washington	4	–	3	–	0	8	–	3	–	0
California	4	–	3	–	0	6	–	5	–	0
Oregon State	3	–	3	–	0	5	–	6	–	0
Oregon	2	–	4	–	0	5	–	6	–	0
Washington State	2	–	5	–	0	4	–	7	–	0
UCLA	1	–	4	–	1	2	–	7	–	1
$ – Conference champion; Rankings from AP Poll

The 1971 Washington Huskies football team was an American football team that represented the University of Washington during the 1971 NCAA University Division football season. In its 15th season under head coach Jim Owens, the team compiled an 8–3 record (4–3 in the Pacific-8 Conference, tied for third), and outscored its opponents 357 to 188.

Washington opened with four non-conference wins, and junior quarterback Sonny Sixkiller was featured in a Sports Illustrated cover story. They lost the Pac-8 opener to defending champion Stanford in Seattle, then at border rival Oregon by two points, as a short field goal attempt in the last minute missed wide right.

After rebounding with three wins to improve to 7–2, the season ended with two home games. USC won by one point for UW's third loss; in the Apple Cup, the Huskies notched a third consecutive win over Washington State.

The Pac-8 did not allow a second bowl team until the 1975 season; the Huskies climbed to #19 in the final AP poll in January.

== Schedule ==
Date	Time	Opponent	Rank	Site	Result	Attendance	Source
September 11		UC Santa Barbara*		Husky Stadium; Seattle, WA	W 65–7	56,000	
September 18		Purdue*		Husky Stadium; Seattle, WA	W 38–35	58,500	
September 25		TCU*	No. 17	Husky Stadium; Seattle, WA	W 44–26	59,900	
October 2		at Illinois*	No. 15	Memorial Stadium; Champaign, IL	W 52–14	48,127	
October 9	1:30 p.m.	No. 19 Stanford	No. 11	Husky Stadium; Seattle, WA	L 6–17	60,777	
October 16		at Oregon	No. 18	Autzen Stadium; Eugene, OR (rivalry)	L 21–23	44,200	
October 23		Oregon State		Husky Stadium; Seattle, WA	W 38–14	57,900	
October 30		at UCLA		Los Angeles Memorial Coliseum; Los Angeles, CA	W 23–12	36,545	
November 6	1:59 p.m.	at California	No. 20	California Memorial Stadium; Berkeley, CA	W 30–7	36,000	
November 13		No. 15 USC	No. 19	Husky Stadium; Seattle, WA	L 12–13	59,800	
November 20		Washington State		Husky Stadium; Seattle, WA (Apple Cup)	W 28–20	60,100	
*Non-conference game; Rankings from AP Poll released prior to the game; All times are in Pacific time

== Roster ==
1971 Washington Huskies football team roster
Players
Coaches
Offense

Pos.	#	Name	Class
QB	6	Sonny Sixkiller (C)	Jr
FB	8	Larry Dumas
QB	15	Greg Collins	Jr
WR	26	Tom Scott	Jr
RB	29	Jim Eicher	So
FB	30	Pete Taggares	So
FB	31	Jerry Ingalls	So
C	53	Jim Andrilenas	So
C	56	Al Kelso	Jr
G	64	Pete Elswick	So
G	67	Fred Miller	Jr
OT	68	Rick Hayes	So
OT	73	Steve Anderson (C)	Jr
WR	83	Jim Krieg	Sr
OT	87	John Brady	Jr
TE	88	Tom Roehl	Jr

Defense

Pos.	#	Name	Class
FS	18	Bill Cahill	Jr
CB	20	Calvin Jones	Jr
S	24	Tony Bonwell	Jr
LB	36	Bob Ferguson	Jr
CB	47	Charles Buckland	Jr
LB	48	Rick Huget (C)	Sr
LB	49	Al Craig	Sr
DT	59	Gordy Guinn	Jr
DT	69	Ben Albrecht	Jr
DE		Dave Wargon	Jr
DE	96	Al Kravitz (C)	Sr
DE	99	Kurt Matter	Jr

Special teams

Pos.	#	Name	Class
P	14	Gene Willis	Sr
K	16	Steve Wiezbowski	Jr
P	46	Dick Galuska	Sr

Head coach

- Jim Owens (15th year)

Coordinators/assistant coaches

Legend

- (C) Team captain
- (S) Suspended
- (I) Ineligible
- Injured
- Redshirt

== NFL draft selections ==
One University of Washington Husky was selected in the 1972 NFL draft, which lasted 17 rounds with 442 selections.

= Husky Hall of Fame

Player	Position	Round	Pick	Franchise
Jim Krieg	Wide receiver	5th	118	Denver Broncos
