= John Vella =

American football player (1950–2025)

No. 75, 71
- Position: Offensive tackle

Personal information
- Born: April 21, 1950; Cleveland, Ohio, U.S.
- Died: April 1, 2025 (aged 74)
- Listed height: 6 ft 4 in (1.93 m)
- Listed weight: 258 lb (117 kg)

Career information
- High school: Notre Dame (Sherman Oaks, California)
- College: USC
- NFL draft: 1972: 2nd round, 43rd overall pick

Career history
- Oakland Raiders (1972–1979); Minnesota Vikings (1980)

Awards and highlights
- Super Bowl champion (XI); First-team All-American (1971); First-team All-Pac-8 (1971)
- Stats at Pro Football Reference

John A. Vella (April 21, 1950 – April 1, 2025) was an American professional football player who was an offensive tackle for the Oakland Raiders of the National Football League (NFL) between 1972 and 1979. He played college football for the USC Trojans.

== Early life ==
Vella prepped at Notre Dame High School in Sherman Oaks, California. The quarterback on this team was future MLB shortstop Tim Foli.

== College career ==
Vella played college football at the University of Southern California and was an All-American in 1971. He was also a member of the baseball team that won the 1970 College World Series.

== Professional career ==
Joining the Oakland Raiders as a second-round pick, Vella started his career as a backup on an offensive line that featured four future Hall of Famers, including tackles Art Shell and Bob Brown. A starter from 1974 to 1976, the 6–4, 265 lb. Vella was part of the Super Bowl XI championship team that dominated the Vikings. From 1977 to 1979, Vella was hampered by injuries, and lost his starting job to Henry Lawrence. His final year in the league, 1980, was spent with the Minnesota Vikings.

In the documentary "America's Game: 1976 Oakland Raiders," Phil Villapiano refers to Vella as "Happy Fella John Vella," saying "Don't upset Happy Fella, 'cause he will tear your head off!"

== Business career ==
In 1987, Vella started his business, originally called "John Vella's Raider Locker Room", with one store in Castro Valley, California. At the time, the Raiders played in Los Angeles. The idea was for a retail store that sold only Raiders gear, novelties and collectibles and catered to the die-hard fans whom he remembered from his playing days. He quickly realized he had found a niche and when the Raiders returned to Oakland in 1995, his business boomed.

== Death ==
Vella died on April 1, 2025, at the age of 74.
