= 1971 UCLA Bruins football team =

American college football season

1971 UCLA Bruins football
- Conference: Pacific-8 Conference
- Record: 2–7–1 (1–4–1 Pac-8)
- Head coach: Pepper Rodgers (1st season)
- Offensive scheme: Wishbone
- Home stadium: Los Angeles Memorial Coliseum

1971 Pacific-8 Conference football standings
	Conf.					Overall
Team	W		L		T	W		L		T
No. 10 Stanford $	6	–	1	–	0	9	–	3	–	0
No. 20 USC	3	–	2	–	1	6	–	4	–	1
No. 19 Washington	4	–	3	–	0	8	–	3	–	0
California	4	–	3	–	0	6	–	5	–	0
Oregon State	3	–	3	–	0	5	–	6	–	0
Oregon	2	–	4	–	0	5	–	6	–	0
Washington State	2	–	5	–	0	4	–	7	–	0
UCLA	1	–	4	–	1	2	–	7	–	1
$ – Conference champion; Rankings from AP Poll

The 1971 UCLA Bruins football team represented the University of California, Los Angeles (UCLA) in the Pacific-8 Conference (Pac-8) during the 1971 NCAA University Division football season. Led by new head coach Pepper Rodgers, the Bruins were ranked 15th by AP in the pre-season poll, but finished at 2–7–1 (1–4–1 in Pac-8, last). Home games were played at the Los Angeles Memorial Coliseum.

== Schedule ==
Date	Time	Opponent	Rank	Site	Result	Attendance	Source
September 11		Pittsburgh*	No. 15	Los Angeles Memorial Coliseum; Los Angeles, CA	L 25–29	36,205	
September 18		No. 3 Texas*		Los Angeles Memorial Coliseum; Los Angeles, CA	L 10–28	36,504	
September 25		at No. 4 Michigan*		Michigan Stadium; Ann Arbor, MI	L 0–38	88,042	
October 2		Oregon State		Los Angeles Memorial Coliseum; Los Angeles, CA	L 17–34	33,345	
October 9		at Washington State		Joe Albi Stadium; Spokane, WA	W 34–21	30,500	
October 16		at Arizona*		Arizona Stadium; Tucson, AZ	W 28–12	37,500	
October 23	7:32 p.m.	California		Los Angeles Memorial Coliseum; Los Angeles, CA (rivalry)	L 24–31	30,741	
October 30		Washington		Los Angeles Memorial Coliseum; Los Angeles, CA	L 12–23	36,545	
November 6	1:35 p.m.	at No. 12 Stanford		Stanford Stadium; Stanford, CA	L 9–20	61,000	
November 20		at No. 15 USC		Los Angeles Memorial Coliseum; Los Angeles, CA	T 7–7	68,426	
*Non-conference game; Rankings from AP Poll released prior to the game; All times are in Pacific time

== Game summaries ==
=== USC ===
	1	2	3	4	Total
UCLA	0	0	7	0	7
USC	0	7	0	0	7

The game was played to a 7–7 tie before 68,426 at the Coliseum and a nationwide TV audience. Lou Harris scored for the Trojans and Marv Kendricks scored a 7-yard touchdown for the Bruins. Efrén Herrera kicked the PAT to tie the game in the third quarter.

== Awards and honors ==
- All-Americans: Dave Dalby (C)
- All-Conference First Team: Dave Dalby (C), Bob Christiansen (OE)
