= Willie Hall (American football) =

American football player (born 1949)

No. 56, 39
- Position: Linebacker

Personal information
- Born: September 30, 1949 (age 77); Montrose, Georgia, U.S.
- Listed height: 6 ft 2 in (1.88 m)
- Listed weight: 223 lb (101 kg)

Career information
- High school: Pulaski High School (CT)
- College: Arizona Western College (1968-1969); USC (1970-1971)
- NFL draft: 1972: 2nd round, 31st overall pick

Career history
- New Orleans Saints (1972–1973); Oakland Raiders (1975–1978)

Awards and highlights
- Super Bowl champion (XI); Second-team All-American (1971); First-team All-Pac-8 (1971)

Career NFL statistics
- Sacks: 6.5
- Interceptions: 5
- Fumble recoveries: 3
- Stats at Pro Football Reference

Willie Charles Hall (born September 29, 1949) is an American former professional football player who was a linebacker in the National Football League (NFL). He played college football at Arizona Western College before playing for the USC Trojans. He was selected in the second round of the 1972 NFL draft with the 31st overall pick. Hall played in the NFL for the New Orleans Saints (1972–1973) and the Oakland Raiders (1975–1978). Acquired by Oakland in 1975, he was a starting linebacker on the 1976 Super Bowl XI champion Raiders, then retired after the 1978 season.
