= Clark Hoss =

American football player (born 1949)

No. 80
- Position: Tight end

Personal information
- Born: February 19, 1949 (age 77); Portland, Oregon, U.S.
- Listed height: 6 ft 8 in (2.03 m)
- Listed weight: 235 lb (107 kg)

Career information
- High school: West Linn (OR)
- College: Oregon State
- NFL draft: 1972: 7th round, 165th overall pick

Career history
- Philadelphia Eagles (1972); Portland Thunder (1974); Detroit Wheels (1974)
- Stats at Pro Football Reference

Clark Hoss (born February 19, 1949) is an American former professional football player who was a tight end for the Philadelphia Eagles of the National Football League (NFL) in 1972. He played college football for the Oregon State Beavers.
