= Pete Lazetich =

American football player (born 1950)

No. 51, 71, 73
- Position: Defensive lineman

Personal information
- Born: February 4, 1950 (age 76); Billings, Montana, U.S.
- Listed height: 6 ft 3 in (1.91 m)
- Listed weight: 245 lb (111 kg)

Career information
- High school: Billings
- College: Stanford
- NFL draft: 1972: 2nd round, 36th overall pick

Career history
- San Diego Chargers (1972–1974); Philadelphia Eagles (1976–1977)

Awards and highlights
- Second-team All-American (1971); First-team All-Pac-8 (1971); Second-team All-Pac-8 (1970)

Career NFL statistics
- Sacks: 5.5
- Fumble recoveries: 2
- Stats at Pro Football Reference

Peter Gary Lazetich (born February 4, 1950) is an American former professional football player who was a defensive lineman for five seasons with the San Diego Chargers and Philadelphia Eagles of the National Football League (NFL). He played college football for the Stanford Cardinal.

After retiring from NFL football, Lazetich started a court messenger service in Reno, Nevada. His son, Johnno, was a star fullback and linebacker at Reno High School, and played college football at Oregon State and later, Kansas State.
