= Greg Sampson =

American football player (born 1950)

No. 91, 73
- Positions: Tackle, defensive end, defensive tackle

Personal information
- Born: October 25, 1950 (age 76); Bellingham, Washington, U.S.
- Listed height: 6 ft 6 in (1.98 m)
- Listed weight: 265 lb (120 kg)

Career information
- High school: R.A. Millikan (CA)
- College: Stanford
- NFL draft: 1972: 1st round, 6th overall pick

Career history
- Houston Oilers (1972–1978)

Career NFL statistics
- Games played: 93
- Games started: 67
- Fumble recoveries: 3
- Stats at Pro Football Reference

Ralph Gregory Sampson (born October 25, 1950) is an American former professional football player for the Houston Oilers of the National Football League (NFL).

== College and professional career ==
Sampson graduated from Stanford University in 1972, where he starred as a defensive end, playing on two Rose Bowl-winning teams (1971 and 1972).

Sampson grew up in Long Beach, California and graduated in 1968 from Millikan High School, where he first joined the football team his junior year as the kicker.

In 1972, he was selected sixth overall in the first round by the Houston Oilers as a defensive end. In 1974, he switched to offensive tackle and steadily improved, until he became second-team ALL-AFC in 1978. But then during a 1979 pre-season drill with his teammates, his helmet was struck and a blood clot in the brain developed. A surgical intervention removed it, probably saving his life, but he could no longer play and retired after the 1979 season.

In 2010, Sampson was voted by the Corpus Christi Caller-Times as the Houston Oilers best offensive lineman in the history of the team.
