= Bob Gambold =

American athlete and football coach (1929–2008)

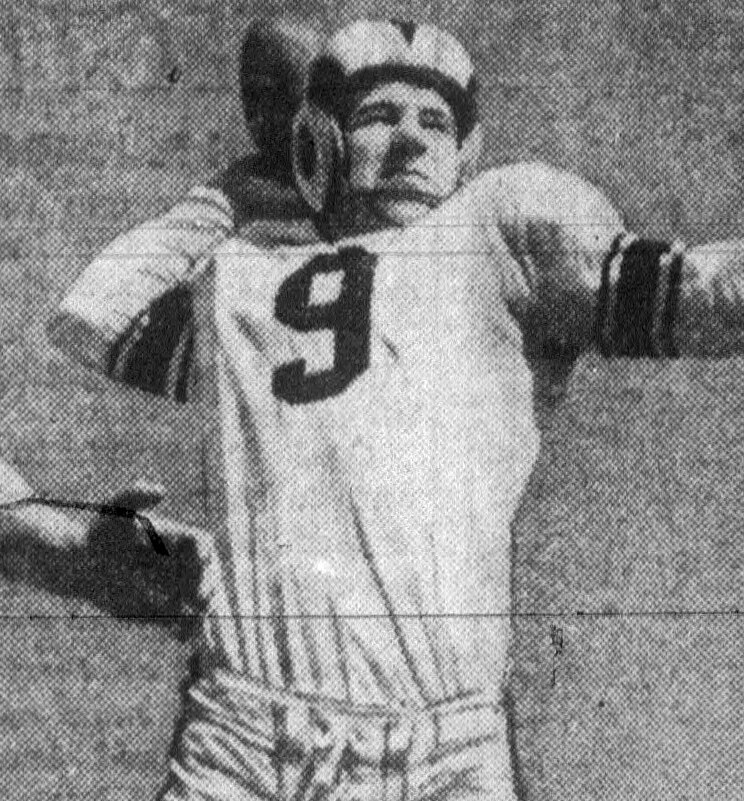
- Gambold, c. 1953
- Born: February 5, 1929; Longview, Washington, U.S.
- Died: October 25, 2008 (aged 79); Arizona, U.S.
- Education: Washington State University
- Coaching career

Playing career
- 1948–1950: Washington State
- Position: Quarterback

Coaching career (HC unless noted)
- ?: Everett (assistant)
- ?: Oregon State (assistant)
- 1956–1960: Washington State (assistant)
- 1963–1971: Stanford (assistant)
- Basketball career

Career information
- College: Washington State
- Position: Forward
- Football career

Career information
- NFL draft: 1950: 24th round, 307th overall pick

Career history

Playing
- Los Angeles Rams; Chicago Cardinals; Philadelphia Eagles

Coaching
- Denver Broncos (1972–1977; LB coach / DB coach); Houston Oilers (1978–1982; DB coach)

Awards and highlights
- Second-team All-PCC (1950)
- Stats at Pro Football Reference

Robert Lee Gambold (February 5, 1929 – October 25, 2008) was an athletic star at Washington State University, who played briefly in the National Football League (NFL) and coached in college and the NFL.

== Biography ==
Gambold was born and raised in Longview, Washington where he graduated from R.A. Long High School. He played both football and basketball for the Washington State Cougars, as the team's starting quarterback in 1948, 1949 and 1950, and as a starting forward for basketball coach Jack Friel in those same three seasons. He was a first-team All-PCC basketball selection in 1951.

After graduating from college, he played briefly in the NFL for the Los Angeles Rams, Chicago Cardinals and the Philadelphia Eagles. The 6-foot, 4 inch quarterback weighed 215 pounds, and was drafted by the Chicago Cardinals in the 24th round of the 1950 NFL draft, as the 307th pick overall. His only stats in the NFL were with the Eagles in 1953, when he played in three games, completing six out of 14 passes for 107 yards, no touchdowns and two interceptions. He became a coach after his professional career, working as an assistant at Everett Junior College (now Everett Community College), Oregon State University, Stanford University and at his alma mater, Washington State University. He was an assistant coach in the NFL for the Denver Broncos and the Houston Oilers.

A chapter written by Gambold while he was an assistant coach at Stanford, titled "Establishing a Winning defensive Mindset", was included in the book Defensive Football Strategies by the American Football Coaches Association, the organization responsible for the USA Today Coaches' Poll. In this piece, Gambold focused on how football defense is fun, a team effort, is attack and is hitting.

Gambold died on October 25, 2008, in Arizona. The cause of his death was complications from Parkinson's disease.
