= 1971 California Golden Bears football team =

American college football season

1971 California Golden Bears football
- Conference: Pacific-8 Conference
- Record: 6–5 (4–3 Pac-8)
- Head coach: Ray Willsey (8th season)
- Home stadium: California Memorial Stadium

1971 Pacific-8 Conference football standings
| | Conf. | | | | | Overall |
| Team | W | | L | | T | W | | L | | T |
|---|---|---|---|---|---|---|---|---|---|---|
| No. 10 Stanford $ | 6 | – | 1 | – | 0 | 9 | – | 3 | – | 0 |
| No. 20 USC | 3 | – | 2 | – | 1 | 6 | – | 4 | – | 1 |
| No. 19 Washington | 4 | – | 3 | – | 0 | 8 | – | 3 | – | 0 |
| California | 4 | – | 3 | – | 0 | 6 | – | 5 | – | 0 |
| Oregon State | 3 | – | 3 | – | 0 | 5 | – | 6 | – | 0 |
| Oregon | 2 | – | 4 | – | 0 | 5 | – | 6 | – | 0 |
| Washington State | 2 | – | 5 | – | 0 | 4 | – | 7 | – | 0 |
| UCLA | 1 | – | 4 | – | 1 | 2 | – | 7 | – | 1 |
$ – Conference champion; Rankings from AP Poll

The 1971 California Golden Bears football team was an American football team that represented the University of California, Berkeley in the Pacific-8 Conference (Pac-8) during the 1971 NCAA University Division football season. In their eighth year under head coach Ray Willsey, the Golden Bears compiled a 6–5 record (4–3 in Pac-8, third), and were outscored 262 to 186. Home games were played on campus at California Memorial Stadium in Berkeley, California.

California's statistical leaders on offense were quarterback Jay Cruze with 1,284 passing yards, Steve Kemnitzer with 686 rushing yards, and Steve Sweeney with 579 receiving yards.

== Schedule ==
| Date | Time | Opponent | Site | Result | Attendance | Source |
|---|---|---|---|---|---|---|
| September 11 | 5:30 p.m. | at No. 7 Arkansas* | War Memorial Stadium; Little Rock, AR | L 20–51 | 54,176 | |
| September 18 | 1:31 p.m. | West Virginia* | California Memorial Stadium; Berkeley, CA | W 20–10 | 23,001–25,000 | |
| September 25 | 1:31 p.m. | San Jose State* | California Memorial Stadium; Berkeley, CA | W 34–10 | 16,000 | |
| October 2 | 10:32 a.m. | at No. 14 Ohio State* | Ohio Stadium; Columbus, OH | L 3–35 | 86,280 | |
| October 9 | 1:30 p.m. | Oregon State | California Memorial Stadium; Berkeley, CA | W 30–27 | 33,000 | |
| October 16 | 1:30 p.m. | at Washington State | Joe Albi Stadium; Spokane, WA | W 24–23 | 12,600 | |
| October 23 | 7:32 p.m. | at UCLA | Los Angeles Memorial Coliseum; Los Angeles, CA (rivalry) | W 31–24 | 30,741 | |
| October 30 | 1:31 p.m. | No. 20 USC | California Memorial Stadium; Berkeley, CA | L 0–28 | 54,000 | |
| November 6 | 1:59 p.m. | No. 20 Washington | California Memorial Stadium; Berkeley, CA | L 7–30 | 36,000 | |
| November 13 | 1:30 p.m. | at Oregon | Autzen Stadium; Eugene, OR | W 17–10 | 18,500 | |
| November 20 | 1:35 p.m. | at No. 18 Stanford | Stanford Stadium; Stanford, CA (Big Game) | L 0–14 | 86,000 | |
*Non-conference game; Rankings from AP Poll released prior to the game; All times are in Pacific time

== Roster ==
1971 California Golden Bears football team roster
Players
Coaches
Offense

| Pos. | # | Name | Class |
|---|---|---|---|
| QB | | Jay Cruze |
| WR | | Steve Sweeney |

Defense

| Pos. | # | Name | Class |
|---|---|---|---|
| DB | | Scott Stringer | Jr |

Special teams

| Pos. | # | Name | Class |

Head coach

- Ray Willsey

Coordinators/assistant coaches

Legend

- (C) Team captain
- (S) Suspended
- (I) Ineligible
- Injured
- Redshirt
