= Sonny Sixkiller =

American football player and sports commentator (born 1951)

No. 28, 6, 11
- Position: Quarterback

Personal information
- Born: September 6, 1951 (age 75); Tahlequah, Oklahoma, U.S.
- Listed height: 5 ft 11 in (1.80 m)
- Listed weight: 190 lb (86 kg)

Career information
- High school: Ashland (OR)
- College: Washington
- NFL draft: 1973: undrafted

Career history
- Philadelphia Bell (1974); The Hawaiians (1975)

Alex L. "Sonny" Sixkiller (born September 6, 1951) is an American former football player and sports commentator. He is currently a senior manager for business development for Huskies Sports Properties, the rights-holder for University of Washington Athletics.

== Early life ==
Sonny Sixkiller, a member of the Cherokee Nation, was born in Tahlequah, Oklahoma. A year later, he moved with his family to Ashland, Oregon where his father worked in a lumber mill. He attended Ashland High School and was a good student and a letterman in football, basketball, and baseball.

In football, Sixkiller was an All-Southern Oregon Conference selection and a second team all-state selection. He was a back-up at quarterback as a sophomore to senior Gene Willis, who later played at Washington. In basketball, he was an all-conference selection. In baseball, he was a pitcher and an all-conference selection. Sixkiller graduated in 1969 and had hoped to stay in-state and play for Oregon State in Corvallis, but head coach Dee Andros declined to offer him a scholarship, wary of his size (5 ft 11 in (1.80 m), 171 lb (78 kg)).

== University of Washington ==
On the advice of Willis, head coach Jim Owens recruited Sixkiller and offered him a scholarship to the University of Washington in Seattle. Due to his name, he was given uniform number 6. Sixkiller became the starting quarterback for the Huskies as a sophomore in 1970, and led the Huskies to a 6–4 record, a vast improvement over the 1–9 record in 1969. He completed 186 passes for 2,303 yards and 15 touchdowns in what many called the Year of The Quarterback.

Sixkiller missed four games as a senior in 1972; he finished his college career with 385 completions for 5,496 yards and 35 touchdowns, and held fifteen school records. The Huskies posted consecutive 8–3 records in 1971 and 1972. The Pac-8 Conference allowed only one team to play in the postseason, the Rose Bowl, until the 1975 season.

== Professional football ==
Unselected in the 1973 NFL draft, Sixkiller had tryouts with the Los Angeles Rams in 1973, and with the Toronto Argonauts of the Canadian Football League in 1974. He signed with the Philadelphia Bell of the World Football League in September 1974, and played with The Hawaiians in 1975, Sixkiller and several other players quit the troubled team late in the season after the players were asked to take a 20% pay cut; the entire league collapsed a week later. He tried out with the San Diego Chargers in 1976.

Sixkiller was also a cast member in the 1974 film The Longest Yard. He is currently an executive for sports marketing firm IMG College, serving his alma mater, the University of Washington.

== See also ==
- Washington Huskies football statistical leaders
