= Jim Krieg =

American football player (1949–2018)

No. 86
- Position: Wide receiver

Personal information
- Born: May 29, 1949; Buffalo, New York, U.S.
- Died: November 10, 2018 (aged 69); Palm Springs, California, U.S.
- Listed height: 5 ft 9 in (1.75 m)
- Listed weight: 172 lb (78 kg)

Career information
- High school: Kenmore East (NY)
- College: Washington
- NFL draft: 1972: 5th round, 118th overall pick

Career history
- Denver Broncos (1972); Portland Storm (1974); Portland Thunder (1975)

Awards and highlights
- Second-team All-Pac-8 (1970)

Career NFL statistics
- Receptions: 4
- Receiving yards: 99
- Stats at Pro Football Reference

Jim Krieg (May 29, 1949 – November 10, 2018) was an American professional football wide receiver who played one season in the National Football League (NFL) for the Denver Broncos. He played college football at the University of Washington and was selected in the fifth round of the 1972 NFL draft.

== College ==
Krieg was a two-year letterman at wide receiver while at Washington from 1970 to 1971. In 1970, his 54 receptions for 738 yards were the most in program history to date. Known as a tremendous special teams player, as of 2012, still he holds Washington's kickoff returns records for career touchdowns (3), season touchdowns (2), and career average (27.7 yds/return).

Following his Washington career, Krieg played in the December 1971 East–West Shrine Game and 1972 Hula Bowl.

== See also ==
- Washington Huskies football statistical leaders
