= 1971 Oregon Ducks football team =

American college football season

1971 Oregon Ducks football
- Conference: Pacific-8 Conference
- Record: 5–6 (2–4 Pac-8)
- Head coach: Jerry Frei (5th season)
- Captains: Jim Figoni; Bobby Moore; Steve Rennie
- Home stadium: Autzen Stadium

1971 Pacific-8 Conference football standings
	Conf.					Overall
Team	W		L		T	W		L		T
No. 10 Stanford $	6	–	1	–	0	9	–	3	–	0
No. 20 USC	3	–	2	–	1	6	–	4	–	1
No. 19 Washington	4	–	3	–	0	8	–	3	–	0
California	4	–	3	–	0	6	–	5	–	0
Oregon State	3	–	3	–	0	5	–	6	–	0
Oregon	2	–	4	–	0	5	–	6	–	0
Washington State	2	–	5	–	0	4	–	7	–	0
UCLA	1	–	4	–	1	2	–	7	–	1
$ – Conference champion; Rankings from AP Poll

The 1971 Oregon Ducks football team represented the University of Oregon during the 1971 NCAA University Division football season. Home games were played in Eugene at Autzen Stadium.

Led by fifth-year head coach Jerry Frei, the Ducks were 5–6 overall and 2–4 in the Pacific-8 Conference. They did not play UCLA and lost the Civil War to Oregon State for an eighth consecutive year.

Oregon was led by junior quarterback Dan Fouts and senior All-American halfback Bobby Moore (Ahmad Rashad), the fourth overall pick of the 1972 NFL draft, taken by the St. Louis Cardinals. Rashad played ten seasons in the NFL, primarily as a wide receiver with the Minnesota Vikings.

Two months after the season, Frei resigned as head coach on January 19, 1972, and assistant coach Dick Enright was promoted two weeks later.

== Schedule ==
Date	Time	Opponent	Site	Result	Attendance	Source
September 11		at No. 2 Nebraska*	Memorial Stadium; Lincoln, NE	L 7–34	67,437	
September 18		Utah*	Autzen Stadium; Eugene, OR	W 36–29	27,000	
September 25	2:00 p.m.	at No. 13 Stanford	Stanford Stadium; Stanford, CA	L 17–38	55,000	
October 2		at No. 3 Texas*	Memorial Stadium; Austin, TX	L 7–35	66,500	
October 9		at USC	Los Angeles Memorial Coliseum; Los Angeles, CA	W 28–23	50,111	
October 16		No. 18 Washington	Autzen Stadium; Eugene, OR (rivalry)	W 23–21	44,200	
October 23	1:30 p.m.	San Jose State*	Autzen Stadium; Eugene, OR	W 34–14	14,000	
October 30		at Washington State	Joe Albi Stadium; Spokane, WA	L 21–31	25,400	
November 6	12:00 p.m.	at Air Force*	Falcon Stadium; Colorado Springs, CO	W 23–14	26,435	
November 13	1:30 p.m.	California	Autzen Stadium; Eugene, OR	L 10–17	18,500	
November 20		Oregon State	Autzen Stadium; Eugene, OR (Civil War)	L 29–30	43,000	
*Non-conference game; Rankings from AP Poll released prior to the game; All times are in Pacific time

== Roster ==
1971 Oregon Ducks football team roster
Players
Coaches
Offense

Pos.	#	Name	Class
FB	41	Jim Anderson	Jr
HB	43	Thurman Anderson	Sr
G	66	LeFrancis Arnold	So
FL	81	Larry Battle	Jr
TE	89	Chuck Bradley	Jr
OT	74	Tom Drougas	Sr
C	54	Jim Figoni	Sr
QB	11	Dan Fouts	Jr
WR	48	Leland Glass	Sr
RB	23	Bobby Moore	Sr
G	70	Tim Stokes	Jr
OL	60	John McKean	Sr
SE	87	Greg Specht	Jr

Defense

Pos.	#	Name	Class
DE	95	Steve Buettner	Sr
DB	12	Greg Brosterhous	Jr
DE	66	Keith Davis	So
CB	38	Bill Drake	Sr
DE	94	Alan Eustace	So
LB	52	Tom Graham	Sr
S	46	Bob Green	Sr
DE	82	Tim Guy	So
LB	92	Bruce Johnson	Jr
LB	93	Delton Lewis	Jr
CB	37	Fred Manuel	Jr
LB	56	Mike McConnell	Sr
DT	78	Rich Osterkamp	Sr
LB	90	Steve Rennie	Sr
DB	27	Bill Steber	Sr
DT	97	Art Webb	So

Special teams

Pos.	#	Name	Class
P	86	Steve Bailey	Sr
K	81	Larry Battle	Jr

Head coach

- Jerry Frei (5th year)

Coordinators/assistant coaches

- John Robinson
- Bruce Snyder
- Dick Enright (OL)
- Norm Chapman
- Ron Stratten (DL)
- George Seifert (DB)
- John Marshall

Legend

- (C) Team captain
- (S) Suspended
- (I) Ineligible
- Injured
- Redshirt

== All-conference ==
Four Oregon seniors were named to the All-Pacific-8 team: halfback Bobby Moore, tackle Tom Drougas, guard John McKean, and defensive back Bill Drake. It was the third straight year on the first team for Moore.
