= 1970 Michigan State Spartans football team =

American college football season

1970 Michigan State Spartans football
- Conference: Big Ten Conference
- Record: 4–6 (3–4 Big Ten)
- Head coach: Duffy Daugherty (17th season)
- MVP: Eric Allen
- Captains: Gordon Bowdell; Michael Hogan; Wilt Martin
- Home stadium: Spartan Stadium

1970 Big Ten Conference football standings
	Conf.					Overall
Team	W		L		T	W		L		T
No. 5 Ohio State $	7	–	0	–	0	9	–	1	–	0
No. 9 Michigan	6	–	1	–	0	9	–	1	–	0
Northwestern	6	–	1	–	0	6	–	4	–	0
Iowa	3	–	3	–	1	3	–	6	–	1
Wisconsin	3	–	4	–	0	4	–	5	–	1
Michigan State	3	–	4	–	0	4	–	6	–	0
Minnesota	2	–	4	–	1	3	–	6	–	1
Purdue	2	–	5	–	0	4	–	6	–	0
Illinois	1	–	6	–	0	3	–	7	–	0
Indiana	1	–	6	–	0	1	–	9	–	0
$ – Conference champion; Rankings from AP Poll

The 1970 Michigan State Spartans football team was an American football team that represented Michigan State University as a member of the Big Ten Conference during the 1970 Big Ten football season. In their 17th season under head coach Duffy Daugherty, the Spartans compiled a 4–6 record (3–4 in conference games), tied for fifth place in the Big Ten, and were outscored by a total of 215 to 190. In four games against ranked opponents, they lost to No. 4 Notre Dame, No. 1 Ohio State, No. 6 Michigan, and No. 18 Northwestern.

On offense, the Spartans gained an average of 171.4 rushing yards and 169.7 passing yards per game. On defense, they gave up 201.0 rushing yards and 148.6 passing yards per game. The individual statistical leaders included quarterback Mike Rasmussen with 1,344 passing yards, halfback Eric Allen with 811 rushing yards and 10 touchdowns, and split end Gordon Bowdell with 34 receptions and 495 receiving yards.

Four Michigan State players received second-team honors from either the Associated Press (AP) or the United Press International (UPI) on the 1970 All-Big Ten Conference football team: split end Gordon Bowdell (AP-2, UPI-2); halfback Eric Allen (UPI-2); offensive guard Joe DeLamielleure (AP-2); and center Tom Beard. Allen was selected as the team's most valuable player.

The team played its home games at Spartan Stadium in East Lansing, Michigan.

== Schedule ==
Date	Opponent	Site	Result	Attendance	Source
September 19	at Washington*	University of Washington Stadium; Seattle, WA	L 16–42	52,000	
September 26	Washington State*	Spartan Stadium; East Lansing, MI	W 28–14	64,053	
October 3	No. 4 Notre Dame*	Spartan Stadium; East Lansing, MI (rivalry)	L 0–29	76,103	
October 10	No. 1 Ohio State	Spartan Stadium; East Lansing, MI	L 0–29	75,511	
October 17	at No. 6 Michigan	Michigan Stadium; Ann Arbor, MI (rivalry)	L 20–34	103,580	
October 24	Iowa^{†}	Spartan Stadium; East Lansing, MI	W 37–0	63,482	
October 31	at Indiana	Seventeenth Street Football Stadium; Bloomington, IN (rivalry)	W 32–7	41,426	
November 7	Purdue	Spartan Stadium; East Lansing, MI	W 24–14	61,113	
November 14	at Minnesota	Memorial Stadium; Minneapolis, MN	L 13–23	42,834	
November 21	No. 18 Northwestern	Spartan Stadium; East Lansing, MI	L 20–23	46,789	
*Non-conference game; ^{†}Homecoming; Rankings from AP Poll released prior to the game

== Roster ==
1970 Michigan State Spartans football team roster
Players
Coaches
Offense

Pos.	#	Name	Class
FB	41	Ken Alderson	So
WR	24	Eric Allen	Jr
RB	44	Earl Anderson	Sr
C	51	Tom Beard	Sr
WR	83	Gordon Bowdell	Sr
WR	19	Randy Davis	Jr
G	59	Joe DeLamielleure	So
TE	89	Billy Joe DuPree	Jr
G	65	Chris King	So
WR	33	Steve Kough	Sr
WR	86	Dennis Macholz	So
RB	23	Henry Matthews	Jr
TE	85	Brian McConnell	So
RB	35	Brad McLee	Jr
OT	71	Vic Mittelberg	Sr
OT	72	Jim Nicholson	Jr
OT	76	Gary Nowak	Sr
QB	12	Mike Rasmussen	Jr
G	60	Mike Tobin	Sr

Defense

Pos.	#	Name	Class
CB	25	Doug Barr	Jr
LB	42	Jay Breslin	Sr
LB	98	Gail Clark	So
DL	96	Bill Dawson	Sr
DE	50	Calvin Fox	Sr
DE	91	Doug Halliday	Jr
DE	61	Ernie Hamilton	So
DB	30	Clifton Hardy	Sr
LB	66	Mike Hogan	Sr
S	38	Tom Kutchinsk	Sr
DT	97	Wilt Martin	Sr
DT	99	Duane McLaughlin	Jr
LB	48	Gary Parmentier	Sr
DB	27	Harold Phillips	Sr
DE	63	Dave Thomas	Sr
S	10	Brad Van Pelt	So
LB	39	Ralph Wielba	Sr

Special teams

Pos.	#	Name	Class
K	3	Gary Boyce	Sr

Head coach

- Duffy Daugherty

Coordinators/assistant coaches

Legend

- (C) Team captain
- (S) Suspended
- (I) Ineligible
- Injured
- Redshirt
