= 1970 Wisconsin Badgers football team =

American college football season

1970 Wisconsin Badgers football
- Conference: Big Ten Conference
- Record: 4–5–1 (3–4 Big Ten)
- Head coach: John Jardine (1st season)
- Offensive coordinator: Paul Roach (1st season)
- Offensive scheme: Option
- Defensive coordinator: Lew Stueck (1st season)
- Base defense: 4–3
- MVP: Chuck Winfrey
- Captain: Bill Gregory
- Home stadium: Camp Randall Stadium

1970 Big Ten Conference football standings
	Conf.					Overall
Team	W		L		T	W		L		T
No. 5 Ohio State $	7	–	0	–	0	9	–	1	–	0
No. 9 Michigan	6	–	1	–	0	9	–	1	–	0
Northwestern	6	–	1	–	0	6	–	4	–	0
Iowa	3	–	3	–	1	3	–	6	–	1
Wisconsin	3	–	4	–	0	4	–	5	–	1
Michigan State	3	–	4	–	0	4	–	6	–	0
Minnesota	2	–	4	–	1	3	–	6	–	1
Purdue	2	–	5	–	0	4	–	6	–	0
Illinois	1	–	6	–	0	3	–	7	–	0
Indiana	1	–	6	–	0	1	–	9	–	0
$ – Conference champion; Rankings from AP Poll

The 1970 Wisconsin Badgers football team was an American football team that represented the University of Wisconsin as a member of the Big Ten Conference during the 1970 Big Ten season. In their first year under head coach John Jardine, the Badgers compiled a 4–5–1 record (3–4 in conference games), tied for fifth place in the Big Ten, and outscored opponents by a total of 198 to 195.

The Badgers gained an average of 145.2 passing yards and 147.7 rushing yards per game. On defense, they gave up an average of 155.8 passing yards and 192.1 rushing yards per game. The team's individual statistical leaders included: quarterback Neil Graff (1,313 passing yards); running back Rufus Ferguson (588 rushing yards); and tight end Larry Mialik (33 receptions for 702 yards).

Defensive end Bill Gregory was the team captain. Linebacker Chuck Winfrey was selected as the team's most valuable player. Four Wisconsin players received first- or second-team All-Big Ten honors from the Associated Press (AP) or United Press International (UPI): Gregory at defensive end (AP-1, UPI-1); Chuck Winfrey at linebacker (AP-1, UPI-1); Larry Mialik at split end (AP-1); and Jim DeLisle at defensive tackle (AP-2, UPI-2).

The Badgers played their home games at Camp Randall Stadium in Madison, Wisconsin.

== Schedule ==
Date	Opponent	Site	Result	Attendance	Source
September 19	at No. 18 Oklahoma*	Oklahoma Memorial Stadium; Norman, OK	L 7–21	58,100	
September 26	TCU*	Camp Randall Stadium; Madison, WI	T 14–14	61,539	
October 3	No. 16 Penn State*	Camp Randall Stadium; Madison, WI	W 29–16	55,204	
October 10	at Iowa	Iowa Stadium; Iowa City, IA (rivalry)	L 14–24	53,622	
October 17	Northwestern	Camp Randall Stadium; Madison, WI	L 14–24	65,278	
October 24	at Indiana	Seventeenth Street Football Stadium; Bloomington, IN	W 30–12	48,643	
October 31	No. 5 Michigan^{†}	Camp Randall Stadium; Madison, WI	L 15–29	72,389	
November 7	No. 3 Ohio State	Camp Randall Stadium; Madison, WI	L 7–24	72,758	
November 14	at Illinois	Memorial Stadium; Champaign, IL	W 29–17	36,569	
November 21	Minnesota	Camp Randall Stadium; Madison, WI (rivalry)	W 39–14	50,167	
*Non-conference game; ^{†}Homecoming; Rankings from AP Poll released prior to the game

== Game summaries ==
=== Penn State ===
Team	1	2	3	4	Total
Penn State	3	7	6	0	16
• Wisconsin	0	7	9	13	29

- Date: October 3
- Location: Camp Randall Stadium, Madison, Wisconsin

Scoring summary
1		PSU	Reitz 35 yard field goal	PSU 3-0
2		WIS	Ferguson 3 yard run (Jaeger kick)	WIS 7-3
2		PSU	Edmonds 15 yard pass from Parson (Reitz kick)	PSU 10-7
3		WIS	Larry Mialik 68 yard pass from Graff (kick failed)	Tied WIS 13-10
3		WIS	Jaeger 42 yard field	WIS 16-10
3		PSU	Edmonds 11 yard pass from Parson (kick failed)	Tied 16-16
4	8:21	WIS	Terry Whittaker 27 yard pass from Neil Graff (Jaeger kick)	WIS 23-16
4		WIS	Larry Mialik 52 yard pass from Neil Graff (run failed)	WIS 29-16

== Roster ==
1970 Wisconsin Badgers football team roster
Players
Coaches
Offense

Pos.	#	Name	Class
C	51	Jim Fedenia	Sr
RB	21	Rufus Ferguson	So
FB	33	John Fowee	Sr
QB	12	Neil Graff	Jr
WR	89	Albert Hannah	Jr
G, K	64	Roger Jaeger	Jr
FB, P	34	John Krugman	Jr
QB	17	Gary Losse	Jr
FB	30	Gary Lund	So
WR	23	Randy Marks	Sr
TE	88	Larry Mialik	Jr
RB	44	Lance Moon	Jr
OT	66	Terry Scheid	Sr
OT	75	Mike Smolcich	Jr
G	60	Dennis Stephenson	Sr
FB	37	Alan Thompson	Jr
OT	71	Elbert Walker	Jr
WR	82	Terry Whittaker	Jr

Defense

Pos.	#	Name	Class
LB	55	Ed Albright (injured)	Sr
LB	58	Charles Ballweg	Jr
LB	59	Dennis Ballweg	Jr
LB	54	Gary Buss	Sr
S	46	Ron Buss	So
CB	19	Nate Butler	Sr
CB	25	Dan Crooks	Sr
DT	73	Jim DeLisle	Sr
DT	76	Bill Gregory (C)	Sr
CB	24	Neovia Greyer	Jr
LB	42	Dick Hyland	Sr
DE	77	Ted Jefferson	Sr
CB	32	Greg Johnson (I)	Jr
DE	81	James Johnson	Sr
LB	57	Dave Lokanc	So
DT	62	Keith Nosbusch	Sr
DE	87	Bill Poindexter	Jr
LB	48	Dave Schrader	So
RC	25	Tom Shinnick (injured)	Sr
DT	78	Bob Storck	So
CB	20	Lee Wilder	Sr
LB	35	Chuck Winfrey	Sr
LB	47	Bill Yarborough	Sr

Special teams

Pos.	#	Name	Class
G, K	64	Roger Jaeger	Jr
FB, P	34	John Krugman	Jr

Head coach

- John Jardine

Coordinators/assistant coaches

- Paul Roach – Offensive Coordinator/Offensive Backs
- Lew Stueck – Defensive Coordinator/Linebackers
- Norm Dow – Freshman Coach
- Stan Kemp – Wide Receivers/Special Teams
- Jim Martin – Centers and Guards
- Charlie McBride – Tackles and Tight Ends
- Dick Teteak – Defensive Line
- Bob Zeman – Defensive Backs
- LaVern Van Dyke – Administrative Assistant

Legend

- (C) Team captain
- (S) Suspended
- (I) Ineligible
- Injured
- Redshirt

== 1971 NFL draft ==
Player	Position	Round	Pick	NFL club
Bill Gregory	Defensive tackle	3	77	Dallas Cowboys
Dan Crooks	Defensive back	13	319	Atlanta Falcons
