= 1970 Michigan Wolverines football team =

American college football season

1970 Michigan Wolverines football
- Conference: Big Ten Conference

Ranking
- Coaches: No. 7
- AP: No. 9
- Record: 9–1 (6–1 Big Ten)
- Head coach: Bo Schembechler (2nd season)
- Defensive coordinator: Jim Young (2nd season)
- MVPs: Henry Hill; Don Moorhead
- Captains: Henry Hill; Don Moorhead
- Home stadium: Michigan Stadium

1970 Big Ten Conference football standings
	Conf.					Overall
Team	W		L		T	W		L		T
No. 5 Ohio State $	7	–	0	–	0	9	–	1	–	0
No. 9 Michigan	6	–	1	–	0	9	–	1	–	0
Northwestern	6	–	1	–	0	6	–	4	–	0
Iowa	3	–	3	–	1	3	–	6	–	1
Wisconsin	3	–	4	–	0	4	–	5	–	1
Michigan State	3	–	4	–	0	4	–	6	–	0
Minnesota	2	–	4	–	1	3	–	6	–	1
Purdue	2	–	5	–	0	4	–	6	–	0
Illinois	1	–	6	–	0	3	–	7	–	0
Indiana	1	–	6	–	0	1	–	9	–	0
$ – Conference champion; Rankings from AP Poll

The 1970 Michigan Wolverines football team was an American football team that represented the University of Michigan in the 1970 Big Ten Conference football season. In their second season under head coach Bo Schembechler, the Wolverines compiled a 9–1 record, tied for second place in the conference, and outscored opponents by a total of 288 to 90. Michigan's victories included intersectional contests with Arizona (20–9), Washington (17–3), and Texas A&M (14–10). The team won its first nine games before losing to rival Ohio State and was ranked No. 7 in the final UPI Poll and No. 9 in the final AP Poll

Quarterback Don Moorhead and middle guard Henry Hill were selected as the team's most valuable players. The team's statistical leaders included Moorhead with 1,167 passing yards, tailback Billy Taylor with 911 rushing yards and 66 points scored, and split end Paul Staroba with 519 receiving yards.

Offensive tackle Dan Dierdorf was a consensus first-team choice for the 1970 All-America team. Henry Hill received first-team All-America honors from the Central Press Association, and linebacker Marty Huff was similarly honored by the American Football Coaches Association. In addition, 10 Michigan players received first-team honors on the 1970 All-Big Ten Conference football team.

The Wolverines entered the season knowing they would not play in a bowl game. Big Ten rules in place until 1975 allowed only the team representing the conference in the Rose Bowl to participate in the postseason; additionally, the Big Ten had a "no repeat" rule barring appearances in consecutive Rose Bowls until 1972.

== Schedule ==
Date	Opponent	Rank	Site	TV	Result	Attendance
September 19	Arizona*	No. 8	Michigan Stadium; Ann Arbor, MI		W 20–9	80,386
September 26	at Washington*	No. 10	Husky Stadium; Seattle, WA		W 17–3	57,500
October 3	Texas A&M*	No. 9	Michigan Stadium; Ann Arbor, MI		W 14–10	71,732
October 10	at Purdue	No. 7	Ross–Ade Stadium; West Lafayette, IN		W 29–0	69,022
October 17	Michigan State	No. 6	Michigan Stadium; Ann Arbor, MI (rivalry)		W 34–20	103,580
October 24	Minnesota^{†}	No. 5	Michigan Stadium; Ann Arbor, MI (Little Brown Jug)		W 39–13	83,496
October 31	at Wisconsin	No. 5	Camp Randall Stadium; Madison, WI		W 29–15	72,389
November 7	Illinois	No. 5	Michigan Stadium; Ann Arbor, MI (rivalry)		W 42–0	70,781
November 14	Iowa	No. 5	Michigan Stadium; Ann Arbor, MI		W 55–0	66,189
November 21	at No. 5 Ohio State	No. 4	Ohio Stadium; Columbus, OH (The Game)	ABC	L 9–20	87,331
*Non-conference game; ^{†}Homecoming; Rankings from AP Poll released prior to the game

== Season summary ==
=== Preseason ===
The 1969 Michigan team compiled an 8–3 record (6–1 Big Ten), won the Big Ten championship, and was ranked No. 9 in the final AP Poll. Key players from the 1969 team who did not return in 1970 included All-American tight end Jim Mandich, All-American defensive back Tom Curtis, and fullback Garvie Craw. Most key letter winners from the 1969 team did return in 1970, including quarterback Don Moorhead, offensive tackles Dan Dierdorf and Jack Harpring, middle guard Henry Hill, linebacker Marty Huff, wolfman Thom Darden, and running backs Billy Taylor and Glenn Doughty. Jim Betts, backup quarterback in 1969, was moved to defensive back for the 1970 season.

In June 1970, Michigan hired Tirrel Burton as an assistant coach. He began in 1970 as the coach of the freshman football team, later coached receivers from 1972 to 1980 and then took over as the running backs coach from 1980 to 1992.

Michigan's 1970 recruiting class included Dave Brandon, Dave Gallagher, Clint Haslerig, Mike Hoban, Paul Seal, Ed Shuttlesworth, Tom Slade, and Bob Thornbladh.

=== Arizona ===
Week 1: Arizona at Michigan

Team	1	2	3	4	Total
Arizona	3	3	0	3	9
• Michigan	10	0	0	10	20

- Date: September 19
- Location: Ann Arbor
- Game attendance: 80,386

Scoring summary
1	MICH	Dana Coin 42-yard field goal	MICH 3–0
1	MICH	Billy Taylor 29-yard pass from Don Moorhead (Tim Killian kick)	MICH 10–0
1	ARIZ	Steve Hurley 29-yard field goal	MICH 10–3
2	ARIZ	Hurley 44-yard field goal	MICH 10–6
4	ARIZ	Hurley 33-yard field goal	MICH 10–9
4	MICH	Coin 20-yard field goal	MICH 13–9
4	MICH	Lance Scheffler 6-yard run (Killian kick)	MICH 20–9

On September 19, Michigan opened its 1970 season with a 20–9 victory over Arizona, before a crowd of 80,386 at Michigan Stadium. Michigan took a 10–0 lead in the first quarter on a 42-yard field goal from Dana Coin and a touchdown pass from Don Moorhead to Billy Taylor covering 29 yards. Michigan's offense stalled in the second and third quarters, and Arizona closed the gap to one point (10–9) on three Steve Hurley field goals. Michigan extended the lead in the fourth quarter on a second field goal from Dana Coin and a touchdown run by Lance Scheffler. Michigan's defense also intercepted four of Brian Linstrom's passes.

Despite the win, Michigan's offense was criticized for its inconsistent play. Michigan gained only 186 rushing yards and had two drives stall inside Arizona's 25-yard line with no points scored. On another drive, Michigan had a first down at Arizona's five-yard line and was forced to settle for a field goal. Coach Schembechler acknowledged: "Our running game especially was a disappointment. We just weren't blocking. We've got a lot of work to do. But don't underestimate the fact that we won. That's the important thing." A Michigan field goal was also blocked, and a punt was fumbled by Michigan's returner.

In response to coach Schembechler's play calling, the crowd at Michigan Stadium began booing, mostly from the student section, in the third and fourth quarters. After the game, coach Schembechler responded: "Yeah, I heard them boo me. But if you think it bothered me, you're wrong. I may not be a very good coach but I'm a lot smarter than they are."

=== Washington ===
Week 2: Michigan at Washington

Team	1	2	3	4	Total
• Michigan	0	0	10	7	17
Washington	3	0	0	0	3

- Date: September 26
- Location: Seattle
- Game attendance: 57,500

Scoring summary
1	WASH	Steve Wiezbowski 35-yard field goal	WASH 3-0
3	MICH	Dana Coin 39-yard field goal	TIE 3-3
3	MICH	Preston Henry 8-yard run (Tim Killian kick)	MICH 10-3
4	MICH	Henry 30-yard run (Killian kick)	MICH 17-3

On September 26, 1970, Michigan, ranked No. 10 in the UPI poll, defeated Jim Owens' No. 19 Washington Huskies by a 17–3 score before a crowd of 57,500 at Husky Stadium in Seattle. The Huskies had beaten Michigan State, 42–16, the week before.

Washington out-gained Michigan in the first half by 145 yards to 56 yards. Steve Wiezbowksi kicked a 35-yard field goal for a 3–0 lead at halftime. The deficit would have been greater were it not for three interceptions of passes from Washington's highly touted Native American quarterback Sonny Sixkiller.

With Michigan tailback Glenn Doughty ineffective (13 yards on seven carries) and Lance Scheffler sidelined by injury, coach Schembechler sent third-string tailback Preston Henry into the game for the second half. Henry rushed for 113 yards and two touchdowns on 13 carries. Dana Coin also kicked a 39-yard field goal. The defense also stiffened in the second half, as the Wolverines out-gained the Huskies, 226 yards to 56 yards. Thom Darden led the defense with 10 solo tackles and two assists.

=== Texas A&M ===
Texas A&M Aggies (2–1) at #9 Michigan Wolverines (2–0)

Quarter	1	2	3	4	Total
Texas A&M	7	3	0	0	10
Michigan	0	7	0	7	14

at Michigan Stadium, Ann Arbor, Michigan

- Date: October 3
- Game attendance: 71,732
- Recap/Box

Game information

First quarter

- A&M – Steve Burks 10-yard run (Mike Bellar kick). Texas A&M 7–0. Drive: 50 yards

Second quarter

- A&M – Mike Bellar 21-yard field goal. Texas A&M 10–0. Drive:
- MICH – Billy Taylor 1-yard run (Tim Killian kick), 11:06. Texas A&M 10–7. Drive:

Third quarter

- No scoring

Fourth quarter

- MICH – Don Moorhead 7-yard run (Tim Killian kick). Michigan 14–10. Drive: 62 yards

Top passers

- A&M – Lex James – 11/24, 123 yards, INT
- MICH – Don Moorhead – 3/16, 35 yards, 2 INT

Top rushers

- A&M – Doug Neill – 17 rushes, 99 yards
- MICH – Fritz Seyferth – 12 rushes, 64 yards

Top receivers

- A&M – Homer May – 5 receptions, 51 yards
- MICH – Paul Seymour – 1 reception, 16 yards

On October 3, 1970, Michigan defeated Gene Stallings' Texas A&M Aggies by a 14–10 score before a crowd of 71,732 at Michigan Stadium. One week earlier, Texas A&M was beaten by Ohio State, 56–13, but Michigan's offense was unable to move the ball effectively against the Aggies.

Texas A&M, which stunned eventual Southeastern Conference champion LSU 20–18 in Baton Rouge Sept. 19, took a 10–0 lead in the second quarter on a 10-yard touchdown run by Steve Burks and a 21-yard field goal by Pat McDermott. Michigan narrowed the gap in the second quarter after Texas A&M dropped a punt and Michigan recovered at the Aggies' eight-yard line. Billy Taylor scored on a one-yard run, and Texas A&M led, 10–7, at halftime. The defense held Texas A&M scoreless in the second half, led by Pete Newell with 15 solo tackles and linebacker Marty Huff with 13 solo tackles.

The offense continued to struggle in the second half, and quarterback Don Moorhead, who completed only three of 16 passes, was booed in the fourth quarter. Michigan won the game on a 62-yard drive with fullback Fritz Seyferth leading the way. For the game, Seyferth totaled 64 rushing yards on 11 carries. But it was Moorhead who silenced the critics by scoring the winning touchdown on a seven-yard run. Asked after the game if he heard the boos, Moorhead replied: "Yeah, I heard 'em. Let 'em boo. They booed Bo two weeks ago, but they don't know what's going on down there."

=== Purdue ===
Week 4: Michigan at Purdue

Team	1	2	3	4	Total
• Michigan	0	6	0	23	29
Purdue	0	0	0	0	0

- Date: October 10
- Location: Ross–Ade Stadium
- Game attendance: 69,022

Scoring summary
2	MICH	Billy Taylor 4-yard run (kick missed)	MICH 6–0
4	MICH	Dana Coin 32-yard field goal	MICH 9–0
4	MICH	Lance Scheffler 7-yard pass from Don Moorhead (Tim Killian kick)	MICH 16–0
4	MICH	Paul Seymour 10-yard pass from Moorhead (Killian kick)	MICH 23–0
4	MICH	Preston Henry 7-yard run (kick missed)	MICH 29–10

On October 10, 1970, Michigan defeated Purdue, 29–0, before a crowd of 69,022 at Ross–Ade Stadium in West Lafayette, Indiana. Purdue had upset No. 3 Stanford with 26 points the prior week, and no Purdue team had been shut out since 1963.

Michigan's Billy Taylor had played at fullback in the first three games and was moved to tailback against Purdue. He responded with 89 yards and a touchdown, though he also fumbled twice. Quarterback Don Moorhead, still sick with the flu, completed 9 of 17 passes for 92 yards and two touchdowns. After the game, coach Schembechler praised Moorhead: "He played today after being sick all week. He lost about seven pounds and was as weak as a baby, but he played quite a ballgame."

On defense, Michigan held Purdue's star running back Otis Armstrong to 11 yards on 14 carries. The defense also intercepted three passes from Purdue quarterback Chuck Piebes.

=== Michigan State ===
Week 5: Michigan State at Michigan

Team	1	2	3	4	Total
Michigan State	10	3	0	7	20
• Michigan	7	6	14	7	34

- Date: October 17
- Location: Ann Arbor
- Game attendance: 103,580

Scoring summary
1		MSU	Eric Allen 42-yard run (Borys Shlapak kick)	MSU 7–0
1		MICH	Billy Taylor 26-yard run (Tim Killian kick)	TIE 7–7
1		MSU	Shlapak 25-yard field goal	MSU 10–7
2		MSU	Shlapak 46-yard field goal	MSU 13–7
2		MICH	Taylor 2-yard run (Killian kick failed)	TIE 13–13
3	9:41	MICH	Taylor 4-yard run (Killian kick)	MICH 20–13
3		MICH	Fritz Seyferth 7-yard pass from Don Moorhead (Killian kick)	MICH 27–13
4		MICH	Glenn Doughty 5-yard run (Killian kick)	MICH 34–13
4		MSU	Bill Triplett 3-yard run (Shlapak kick)	MICH 34–20

On October 17, 1970, Michigan, ranked No. 6 in the AP poll, defeated Duffy Daugherty's Michigan State Spartans by a 34–20 score at Michigan Stadium. The crowd of 103,580 was the largest to see a Michigan–Michigan State football rivalry to that point. At the start of the game, Michigan State marched down the field on a drive back capped by a 42-yard touchdown run by Eric Allen. Allen finished the game with 156 yards. Michigan rebounded as Billy Taylor rushed for 149 yards and three touchdowns. Michigan quarterback Don Moorhead completed 12 of 19 passes for 156 yards and a touchdown. Glenn Doughty added 85 rushing yards, 68 receiving yards, and a touchdown.

=== Minnesota ===
Week 6: Minnesota at Michigan

Team	1	2	3	4	Total
Minnesota	0	7	6	6	19
• Michigan	6	12	7	14	39

- Date: October 24
- Location: Ann Arbor
- Game attendance: 83,496

Scoring summary
1	MICH	Billy Taylor 17-yard run (kick failed)	MICH 6–0
2	MICH	Fritz Seyferth 3-yard run (pass failed)	MICH 12–0
2	MINN	Doug Kingsriter 16-yard pass from Craig Curry (Clare kick)	MICH 12–7
2	MICH	Seyferth 4-yard run (run failed)	MICH 18–7
3	MICH	Seyferth 3-yard run (Dana Coin kick)	MICH 25–7
4	MICH	Seyferth 6-yard run (Coin kick)	MICH 32–7
4	MINN	Ernie Cook 4-yard run (pass failed)	MICH 32–13
4	MICH	Lance Scheffler 2-yard run (Killian kick)	MICH 39–13

On October 24, 1970, Michigan defeated Minnesota, 39–13, in the annual Little Brown Jug game before a homecoming crowd of 83,496 at Michigan Stadium. Quarterback Don Moorhead led the offense with 183 yards of total offense, 104 passing yards (7 of 18) and 79 rushing yards. Billy Taylor had 151 rushing yards and a touchdown on 26 carries, and fullback Fritz Seyferth added 76 yards and four touchdowns on 18 carries.

On defense, Michigan held the Gophers to 69 rushing yards. Minnesota quarterback Craig Curry came into the game as the Big Ten Conference leader in total offense, and completed 16 of 37 passes for 214 yards and a touchdown. Michigan intercepted three of Curry' passes, one each by Bruce Elliott, Thom Darden, and Jim Betts. Betts also tallied 12 solo tackles.

=== Wisconsin ===
Week 7: Michigan at Wisconsin

Team	1	2	3	4	Total
• Michigan	7	14	0	8	29
Wisconsin	0	6	9	0	15

- Date: October 31
- Location: Camp Randall Stadium
- Game attendance: 72,389

Scoring summary
1	MICH	Fritz Seyferth 8-yard pass from Don Moorhead (Tim Killian kick)	MICH 7–0
2	MICH	Seyferth 3-yard run (kick failed)	MICH 13–0
2	MICH	Preston Henry 4-yard run (Paul Staroba pass from Moorhead)	MICH 21–0
2	WIS	Alan Thompson 17-yard pass from Neil Graff (kick failed)	MICH 21–6
2	WIS	Danny Crooks 87-yard punt return (run failed)	MICH 21–12
2	WIS	Roger Jaeger 32-yard field goal	MICH 21–15
4	MICH	Staroba 21-yard pass from Moorhead (Billy Taylor run)	MICH 29–15

On October 31, 1970, Michigan defeated Wisconsin, 29–15, before a record crowd of 72,389 at Camp Randall Stadium in Madison, Wisconsin. Michigan jumped to a 21–0 lead on two touchdowns by fullback Fritz Seyferth and one by tailback Preston Henry. Wisconsin responded with 15 points in the second quarter on a 17-yard pass from Neil Graff to Alan "A-Train" Thompson, an 87-yard punt return for touchdown by Danny Crooks, and a Roger Jaeger field goal. Michigan led, 21–15, at halftime. Neither team scored in the third quarter, and Michigan extended its lead in the fourth quarter on a 21-yard touchdown pass from Don Moorhead to Paul Staroba. The Wolverines rushed for 227 rushing yards, and Moorhead completed 11 of 22 passes for 223 yards. Michigan's defense limited Wisconsin to 79 rushing yards and 168 passing yards.

=== Illinois ===
Week 8: Illinois at Michigan

Team	1	2	3	4	Total
Illinois	0	0	0	0	0
• Michigan	7	14	14	7	42

- Date: November 7
- Location: Ann Arbor
- Game attendance: 70,781

Scoring summary
1	2:22	MICH	Glenn Doughty 3-yard run (Dana Coin kick)	MICH 7–0
2		MICH	Doughty 4-yard run (Coin kick)	MICH 14–0
2		MICH	Billy Taylor 2-yard run (Coin kick)	MICH 21–0
3		MICH	Gerald Schumacher 4-yard pass from Don Moorhead (Coin kick)	MICH 28–0
3		MICH	Taylor 7-yard run (Coin kick)	MICH 35–0
4		MICH	Lance Scheffler 1-yard run (Coin kick)	MICH 42–0

On November 7, 1970, Michigan defeated Illinois, 42–0, before a crowd of 70,781 (the smallest of the season) at Michigan Stadium. Schembechler emptied the bench to avoid running up the score, using 54 players in the game. Tailback Billy Taylor and wingback Glenn Doughty scored two touchdowns each. Doughty had 81 receiving yards in addition to 40 rushing yards. Backup running back Lance Scheffler, a senior, rushed for 75 yards and a touchdown. Tight end Gerry Schumacher added a touchdown on a pass from Don Moorhead. Moorhead completed nine of 14 passes for 116 yards. On defense, Michigan held the Illini to 71 rushing yards and 101 passing yards and intercepted two Illinois passes.

=== Iowa ===
Week 9: Iowa at Michigan

Team	1	2	3	4	Total
Iowa	0	0	0	0	0
• Michigan	21	14	7	13	55

- Date: November 14
- Location: Ann Arbor
- Game attendance: 66,189

Scoring summary
1	MICH	Billy Taylor 1-yard run (Coin kick)	MICH 7-0
1	MICH	Glenn Doughty 2-yard run (Dana Coin kick)	MICH 14-0
1	MICH	Taylor 2-yard run (Coin kick)	MICH 21-0
2	MICH	Don Moorhead 24-yard run (Coin kick)	MICH 28-0
2	MICH	Fritz Seyferth 3-yard run (Coin kick)	MICH 35-0
3	MICH	Thom Darden recovered fumble in end zone (Coin kick)	MICH 42-0
4	MICH	Lance Scheffler 5-yard run (Coin kick)	MICH 49-0
4	MICH	David Zuccarelli 7-yard run (kick failed)	MICH 55-0

On November 14, 1970, Michigan, ranked No. 5 in the AP and UPI polls, defeated Ray Nagel's Iowa Hawkeyes, 55–0, before a crowd of 66,189 at Michigan Stadium. The win gave Michigan a 9–0 record for the first time since its 1948 national championship season.

Michigan's offense gained 561 yards, the third highest total in school history to that point, including 468 rushing yards. Michigan punted on its first possession (the first of only two punts in the game), but Iowa's returner touched the ball with Michigan recovering at the three-yard line to set up the first Wolverine touchdown. Billy Taylor led the offense with 189 yards and two touchdowns on 23 carries in the first three quarters. Quarterback Don Moorhead completed six of 11 passes for 88 yards and rushed for 65 yards and a touchdown. In his final home game for Michigan, Moorhead also passed Bob Chappuis as the school's all-time leader in total offense. Glenn Doughty also totaled 61 yards (36 receiving, 25 rushing).

On defense, Michigan held Iowa to 88 rushing yards and 34 passing yards. Iowa did not cross midfield until there were 25 seconds left in the game. The defense also recovered five Iowa fumbles, including a fumble recovery in the end zone for a touchdown by Thom Darden.

=== Ohio State ===
Week 10: Michigan at Ohio State

Team	1	2	3	4	Total
Michigan	0	3	6	0	9
• Ohio State	3	7	0	10	20

- Date: November 21
- Location: Ohio Stadium
- Game start: 1:15 p.m.
- Game attendance: 87,331
- Game weather: 44 °F (7 °C)
- Referee: Ross Dean (Big Ten)

Scoring summary
1	12:18	OSU	Fred Schram 28-yard field goal	OSU 3–0
2	14:57	MICH	Dana Coin 31-yard field goal	TIE 3–3
2	1:18	OSU	Bruce Jankowski 26-yard pass from Rex Kern (Schram kick)	OSU 10–3
3	8:30	MICH	Paul Staroba 13-yard pass from Don Moorhead (kick blocked)	OSU 10–9
4	10:49	OSU	Schram 27-yard field goal	OSU 13–9
4	8:14	OSU	Leo Hayden 4-yard run (Schram kick)	OSU 20–9

On November 21, 1970, Michigan lost to Woody Hayes' Ohio State Buckeyes by a 20–9 score before a record crowd of 87,331 at Ohio Stadium in Columbus, Ohio. Both teams came into the game undefeated and were ranked No. 4 and No. 5, respectively, in the AP Poll.

Michigan's Lance Scheffler fumbled the opening kickoff, and Ohio State recovered the ball at Michigan's 25-yard line. Ohio State's Fred Schram kicked a 28-yard field goal for an early lead. Michigan tied the game after Jim Betts intercepted a Rex Kern pass and returned it to the Ohio State 18-yard line, setting up a 31-yard field goal by Dana Coin. Shortly before halftime, and after calling (and being granted) an extra fifth timeout, Ohio State took a 10–3 lead on a 26-yard touchdown pass from Kern to Bruce Jankowski.

Midway through the third quarter, Michigan scored on a 13-yard touchdown pass from Don Moorhead to Paul Staroba. Michigan's kick for extra point was blocked by Mike Anderson, and Ohio State led by one point. In the fourth quarter, the Buckeyes extended their lead to four points on Fred Schram's second field goal. On the next drive, Ohio State linebacker Stan White intercepted Moorhead's pass at Michigan's 24-yard line and returned it to the nine-yard line, setting up a four-yard touchdown run by Leo Hayden.

Michigan was unable to move the ball on the ground, gaining only 37 rushing yards on 30 carries. Billy Taylor led the Wolverines with 31 yards on 15 carries. After the game, coach Schembechler noted: "We didn't move on the ground. That was the ball game. I don't know why we couldn't move . . . We didn't seem to block very much."

Forced to an air attack, Michigan quarterback Don Moorhead completed 12 of 26 passes for 118 yards. In his final game for Michigan, Moorhead established new Michigan career records for completions (199) and total passing yards (2,540).

The Buckeyes, on the other hand, moved the ball effectively with running backs Leo Hayden (117 rushing yards on 28 carries) and John Brockington (77 yards on 27 carries). Ohio State quarterback Rex Kern also completed eight of 12 passes for 87 yards.

In his postgame interview, Ohio State coach Woody Hayes asked, "Is this our best team ever? Well, today it was. Today, this was the best we've ever been."

=== Award season ===
Two Michigan players received first-team honors on the 1969 All-America team

- Offensive tackle Dan Dierdorf was a consensus first-team All-American, receiving first-team honors from the American Football Coaches Association, Associated Press (AP), Football Writers Association of America, Newspaper Enterprise Association, United Press International (UPI), Football News, Pro Football Weekly, Time magazine, and Walter Camp Football Foundation.
- Linebacker Marty Huff was selected as a first-team All-American by the American Football Coaches Association.
- Middle guard Henry Hill was selected as a first-team All-American by the Central Press Association.

Thirteen Michigan players received recognition from the AP and/or UPI on the 1970 All-Big Ten Conference football team: Don Moorhead at quarterback (AP-1, UPI-1), Paul Staroba at offensive end (AP-1, UPI-1), Dan Dierdorf at offensive tackle (AP-1, UPI-1), Phil Seymour at defensive end (AP-1, UPI-1), Henry Hill at defensive tackle (AP-1, UPI-1 [tie]), Pete Newell at defensive tackle (AP-1, UPI-1), Reggie McKenzie at guard (AP-2, UPI-1), Marty Huff at linebacker (AP-2, UPI-1), Billy Taylor at halfback (AP-2, UPI-1), Guy Murdock at center (UPI-1 [tie]), Mike Keller at defensive end (UPI-2), Jim Betts at defensive back (UPI-2), and Jack Harpring at tackle (AP-2).

Team awards were presented at the end of the season as follows:

- Most Valuable Player: Henry Hill, Don Moorhead
- Meyer Morton Award: Jim Betts
- John Maulbetsch Award: Tom Coyle
- Frederick Matthei Award: Bruce Elliott
- Arthur Robinson Scholarship Award: John Harpring

== Personnel ==
=== Full roster ===
1970 Michigan Wolverines football team roster
Players
Coaches
Offense

Pos.	#	Name	Class
FB	28	Bill Berutti	Sr
OT	76	Jim Brandstatter	Jr
G	60	Thomas Coyle	So
OT	72	Dan Dierdorf	Sr
TB	22	Glenn Doughty	Jr
G	75	Werner Hall	Sr
OT	71	Jack Harpring	Sr
WR	80	William Harris	Sr
C	56	William Hart	So
WB	44	Preston Henry	Jr
TE	89	Thomas Huiskens	Jr
G, K	57	Tim Killian	Sr
QB	25	John McBride	So
G	65	Reggie McKenzie	Jr
QB	27	Don Moorhead	Sr
C	53	Guy Murdock	Jr
TE	83	Thomas Nieman	Sr
WR	84	Michael Oldham	Jr
TB	45	Lance Scheffler	Sr
TE	81	Gerald Schumacher	So
FB	32	Fritz Seyferth	Jr
TE	85	Paul Seymour	Jr
WR	30	Paul Staroba	Sr
RB	42	Billy Taylor	Jr

Defense

Pos.	#	Name	Class
DT	99	Tom Beckman	Jr
S	23	Jim Betts	Sr
DE	94	Alden Carpenter	Jr
LB, K	36	Dana Coin	Jr
DB	19	John Daniels	So
DB	35	Thom Darden	Jr
DB	46	Gerald Dutcher	Sr
DB	86	Donald Eaton	So
DB	21	Bruce Elliott	Jr
MN	68	Gregory Ellis	So
CB	14	Frank Gusich	Jr
DB	17	Gregory Harrison	Sr
MG	39	Henry Hill	Sr
LB	70	Marty Huff	Sr
W	37	Thomas Kee	So
DE	90	Mike Keller	Jr
DT	78	Richard McCoy Jr.	Sr
LB	97	Edward Moore	Sr
DT	82	Pete Newell	Sr
DB	15	Bo Rather	So
DE	91	Philip Seymour	Sr
DT	74	Tony Smith	So
DE	96	Clinton Spearman	So
LB	33	Mike Taylor	Jr

Special teams

Pos.	#	Name	Class

Head coach

- Bo Schembechler

Coordinators/assistant coaches

- Tirrel Burton
- Jerry Hanlon
- Dick Hunter
- Frank Maloney
- George Mans
- Gary Moeller
- Larry Smith
- Chuck Stobart
- Jim Young

Legend

- (C) Team captain
- (S) Suspended
- (I) Ineligible
- Injured
- Redshirt

Roster

=== Offensive starters ===
- William J. "Bill" Berutti, wingback, senior, Franklin, Ohio - started 1 game at fullback
- Thomas J. Coyle, offensive guard, sophomore, Chicago, Illinois - started 8 games at right guard
- Dan Dierdorf, offensive tackle, senior, Canton, Ohio - started all 10 games (9 at right tackle, 1 at left tackle)
- Glenn Doughty, tailback, junior, Detroit, Michigan - started all 10 games (8 at left halfback, 1 at right halfback and 1 at fullback)
- Werner W. Hall, offensive guard, senior, Sandusky, Ohio - started 2 games at right guard
- Jack Harpring, offensive tackle, senior, Cincinnati, Ohio - started all 10 games (9 at left tackle, 1 at right tackle)
- Preston Henry, wingback, junior, Flint, Michigan - started 1 game at right halfback
- Timothy Killian, kicker and offensive guard, senior, Lincoln Park, Michigan - started 2 games at left defensive end
- Reggie McKenzie, offensive guard, junior, Highland Park, Michigan - started all 10 games at left guard
- Don Moorhead, quarterback, senior, South Haven, Michigan - started all 10 games at quarterback
- Guy Murdock, center, junior, Barrington, Illinois - started all 10 games at center
- Michael Oldham, split end, junior, Cincinnati, Ohio - started 2 games at wide linebacker
- Lance G. Scheffler, tailback, senior, Trenton, Michigan - started 1 game at fullback
- Fritz Seyferth, fullback, junior, Darien, Connecticut - started 7 games at fullback and 1 game at left halfback
- Paul Seymour, tight end, junior, Berkley, Michigan - started all 10 games (9 at tight end, 1 at split end)
- Paul Staroba, split end, senior, Flint, Michigan - started all 10 games (9 games at split end, 1 at tight end)
- Billy Taylor, fullback, junior, Barberton, Ohio - started 8 games at right halfback, 1 game at left halfback

=== Defensive starters ===
- Tom Beckman, defensive tackle, junior, Chesaning, Michigan - started all 10 games (8 at left defensive tackle and 2 at right defensive end)
- Jim Betts, safety, senior, Cleveland, Ohio - started all 10 games at safety
- Alden J. Carpenter, defensive end, junior, Flint, Michigan - started 2 games at left defensive end
- Thom Darden, defensive back, junior, Sandusky, Ohio - started 9 games at strong side defensive halfback
- Donald R. Eaton, defensive back, sophomore, Lancaster, Ohio - started 1 game at wide linebacker
- Bruce N. Elliott, defensive back, junior, Indianapolis, Indiana - started 7 games at weak side defensive halfback
- Frank Gusich, wolf, junior, Garfield Heights, Ohio - started all 10 games at cornerback
- Henry Hill, middle guard, senior, Detroit, Michigan - started all 10 games at middle guard
- Marty Huff, linebacker, senior, Toledo, Ohio - started all 10 games at middle linebacker
- Mike Keller, defensive end, junior, Grand Rapids, Michigan - started 7 games at right defensive end and 1 game at left defensive tackle
- Edward M. Moore, linebacker, senior, Youngstown, Ohio - started 2 games at wide linebacker 1 game at left defensive tackle
- Pete Newell, defensive tackle, senior, Park Ridge, Illinois - started 9 games at defensive right tackle
- Bo Rather, defensive back, sophomore, Sandusky, Ohio - started 2 games at weak side defensive halfback
- Philip Seymour, defensive end, senior, Berkley, Michigan - started 7 games at defensive end
- Tony L. Smith, defensive tackle, sophomore, Detroit, Michigan - started 1 game at right defensive tackle
- Mike Taylor, linebacker, junior, Detroit, Michigan - started 5 games at wide linebacker, 1 game at weak side defensive halfback and 1 game at strong side defensive halfback

=== Professional football ===
Fifteen members of the 1970 team went on to play professional football. They are: Tom Beckman (St.Louis Cardinals, 1972, Memphis Grizzlies, 1974–1975), Thom Darden (Cleveland Browns, 1972–1981), Dan Dierdorf (St. Louis Cardinals, 1971–1983), Glenn Doughty (Baltimore Colts, 1972–1979), Marty Huff (San Francisco 49ers, 1972; Edmonton Eskimos, 1973; Charlotte Hornets, 1974–1975), Mike Keller (Dallas Cowboys, 1972), Reggie McKenzie (Buffalo Bills, 1972–1982; Seattle Seahawks, 1983–1984), Guy Murdock (Houston Oilers, 1974; Chicago Fire/Winds, 1974–1975), Pete Newell (BC Lions, 1971); Bo Rather (Miami Dolphins, 1973, 1978; Chicago Bears, 1974–78); Fritz Seyferth (Calgary Stampeders, 1972); Paul Seymour (Buffalo Bills, 1973–1977), Paul Staroba (Cleveland Browns, 1972; Green Bay Packers, 1973), Billy Taylor (Calgary Stampeders, 1972), and Mike Taylor (New York Jets, 1972–73).

=== Coaching staff ===
- Head coach: Bo Schembechler
- Assistant coaches:

- Jim Young - defensive coordinator
- Chuck Stobart - offensive backfield coach
- Jerry Hanlon - offensive line coach
- Dick Hunter - defensive backfield coach
- Frank Maloney - defensive line coach
- George Mans - offensive ends coach
- Gary Moeller - defensive ends coach
- Larry Smith - offensive interior line coach
- Tirrel Burton - freshman coach

- Graduate assistants: Bob Baumgartner, Dennis Brown, Don Busslow, Jeff Green, Mike Hankwitz, Paul Johnson, Jerry Miklos, and Tom Weinman
- Trainer: Lindsy McLean
- Assistant trainers: Mike Willie, Len Paddock, and Jack Redgren
- Manager: Neil Hiller
- Assistant managers: Chuck Quebberman, David Fish, Jerry Fine, Gary Johnson, John Levine

== Statistical leaders ==
=== Rushing ===
Player	Attempts	Net yards	Yards per attempt	Touchdowns
Billy Taylor	197	911	4.6	10
Don Moorhead	97	368	3.8	2
Fritz Seyferth	86	333	3.9	6

=== Passing ===
Player	Attempts	Completions	Interceptions	Comp %	Yards	Yds/Comp	TD
Don Moorhead	190	87	6	45.8	1167	13.4	8

=== Receiving ===
Player	Receptions	Yards	Yds/Recp	TD	Long
Paul Staroba	35	519	14.8	2	14
Glenn Doughty	22	298	13.6	0	14
Paul Seymour	13	194	14.9	1	16

=== Kickoff returns ===
Player	Returns	Yards	Yds/Return	TD	Long
Glenn Doughty	7	116	16.6	0	20
Preston Henry	6	104	17.3	0	20
Bo Rather	3	62	20.7	0	38

=== Punt returns ===
Player	Returns	Yards	Yds/Return	TD	Long
Thom Darden	18	153	8.5	0	21
Bruce Elliott	12	57	4.8	0	11
Bo Rather	1	44	44.0	0	44
