= 1970 Northwestern Wildcats football team =

American college football season

1970 Northwestern Wildcats football
- Conference: Big Ten Conference
- Record: 6–4 (6–1 Big Ten)
- Head coach: Alex Agase (7th season)
- MVP: Mike Adamle
- Captains: Mike Adamle; Joel Hall
- Home stadium: Dyche Stadium

1970 Big Ten Conference football standings
	Conf.					Overall
Team	W		L		T	W		L		T
No. 5 Ohio State $	7	–	0	–	0	9	–	1	–	0
No. 9 Michigan	6	–	1	–	0	9	–	1	–	0
Northwestern	6	–	1	–	0	6	–	4	–	0
Iowa	3	–	3	–	1	3	–	6	–	1
Wisconsin	3	–	4	–	0	4	–	5	–	1
Michigan State	3	–	4	–	0	4	–	6	–	0
Minnesota	2	–	4	–	1	3	–	6	–	1
Purdue	2	–	5	–	0	4	–	6	–	0
Illinois	1	–	6	–	0	3	–	7	–	0
Indiana	1	–	6	–	0	1	–	9	–	0
$ – Conference champion; Rankings from AP Poll

The 1970 Northwestern Wildcats team represented Northwestern University during the 1970 Big Ten Conference football season. In their seventh year under head coach Alex Agase, the Wildcats compiled a 6–4 record (6–1 against Big Ten Conference opponents) and finished in a tie for second place in the Big Ten.

The team's offensive leaders were quarterback Maurie Daigneau with 1,228 passing yards, Mike Adamle with 1,255 rushing yards, and Barry Pearson with 552 receiving yards. Eight Northwestern players received honors on the 1970 All-Big Ten Conference football team. They are: (1) halfback Mike Adamle (AP-1, UPI-1); (2) flanker Barry Pearson (AP-1); (3) tackle John Rodman (AP-1, UPI-2); (4) guard Mike Sikich (AP-1, UPI-1); (5) center John Zigulich (UPI-1); (6) defensive tackle Jim Anderson (AP-2); (7) defensive back Eric Hutchinson (AP-1, UPI-1); and (8) defensive back Rick Telander (AP-2).

== Schedule ==
Date	Opponent	Rank	Site	Result	Attendance	Source
September 19	No. 6 Notre Dame*		Dyche Stadium; Evanston, IL (rivalry)	L 14–35	50,409	
September 26	at No. 15 UCLA*		Los Angeles Memorial Coliseum; Los Angeles, CA	L 7–12	36,803	
October 3	SMU*		Dyche Stadium; Evanston, IL	L 20–21	30,003	
October 10	Illinois		Dyche Stadium; Evanston, IL (rivalry)	W 48–0	33,316	
October 17	at Wisconsin		Camp Randall Stadium; Madison, WI	W 24–14	65,278	
October 24	Purdue		Dyche Stadium; Evanston, IL	W 38–14	38,722	
October 31	at No. 2 Ohio State	No. 20	Ohio Stadium; Columbus, OH	L 10–24	86,673	
November 7	Minnesota		Dyche Stadium; Evanston, IL	W 28–14	33,437	
November 14	at Indiana		Seventeenth Street Stadium; Bloomington, IN	W 21–7	25,778	
November 21	at Michigan State	No. 18	Spartan Stadium; East Lansing, MI	W 23–20	46,789	
*Non-conference game; Rankings from AP Poll released prior to the game

== Roster ==
1970 Northwestern Wildcats football team roster
Players
Coaches
Offense

Pos.	#	Name	Class
RB	34	Mike Adamle (C)	Sr
WR	42	Jerry Brown	Jr
TE	84	Steve Craig	Fr
QB	12	Maurie Daigneau	Jr
G	67	Tom Dickinson	Jr
FB	30	Mark Fassbender	So
OT	71	Paul Gary	Jr
WR	86	Jim Lash	So
TE	92	Tom McCreight	Jr
WR	21	Barry Pearson	Jr
OT	72	John Rodman	Sr
QB	15	Dave Shelbourne	Sr
G	54	Mike Sikich	Sr
WR	33	Robert Wingard	Sr
C	55	Joe Zigulich	Sr

Defense

Pos.	#	Name	Class
DT	74	Jim Anderson	So
DT	93	Frank Bliss	So
DE	78	Jerry Combs	So
DB	29	Mike Coughlin	Jr
LB	93	Jack Derning	Jr
DB	27	Jack Dustin	Jr
LB	66	Joel Hall (C)	Sr
DE	89	Will Hemby	Jr
DB	32	Eric Hutchinson	Jr
DE	87	Tony Koenings	Sr
LB	82	Pat McNamara	So
DB	85	Rick Telander	Sr
DB	35	Dan White	Sr

Special teams

Pos.	#	Name	Class

Head coach

- Alex Agase

Coordinators/assistant coaches

- Ron Marciniak – Offensive line

Legend

- (C) Team captain
- (S) Suspended
- (I) Ineligible
- Injured
- Redshirt

== Team players in the NFL ==
Player	Position	Round	Pick	NFL club
Mike Adamle	Running back	4	120	Kansas City Chiefs
Rick Telander	Defensive back	8	198	Kansas City Chiefs
