= 1970 Illinois Fighting Illini football team =

American college football season

1970 Illinois Fighting Illini football
- Conference: Big Ten Conference
- Record: 3–7 (1–6 Big Ten)
- Head coach: Jim Valek (4th season)
- MVP: Doug Dieken
- Captains: Kirk McMillin; Doug Dieken
- Home stadium: Memorial Stadium

1970 Big Ten Conference football standings
	Conf.					Overall
Team	W		L		T	W		L		T
No. 5 Ohio State $	7	–	0	–	0	9	–	1	–	0
No. 9 Michigan	6	–	1	–	0	9	–	1	–	0
Northwestern	6	–	1	–	0	6	–	4	–	0
Iowa	3	–	3	–	1	3	–	6	–	1
Wisconsin	3	–	4	–	0	4	–	5	–	1
Michigan State	3	–	4	–	0	4	–	6	–	0
Minnesota	2	–	4	–	1	3	–	6	–	1
Purdue	2	–	5	–	0	4	–	6	–	0
Illinois	1	–	6	–	0	3	–	7	–	0
Indiana	1	–	6	–	0	1	–	9	–	0
$ – Conference champion; Rankings from AP Poll

The 1970 Illinois Fighting Illini football team was an American football team that represented the University of Illinois as a member of the Big Ten Conference during the 1970 Big Ten season. In their fourth and final year under head coach Jim Valek, the Fighting Illini compiled a 3–7 record (1–6 in conference games), finished in a tie for last place in the Big Ten, and were outscored by a total of 279 to 165.

The team's statistical leaders included quarterback Mike Wells (906 passing yards, 41.8% completion percentage), running back Darrell Robinson (749 rushing yards, 3.9 yards per carry), and tight end Doug Dieken (39 receptions for 537 yards). Dieken was selected for the second consecutive year as the team's most valuable player. Dieken also won first-team honors on the 1970 All-Big Ten Conference football team.

The team played its home games at Memorial Stadium in Champaign, Illinois.

== Schedule ==
Date	Opponent	Site	Result	Attendance	Source
September 19	Oregon*	Memorial Stadium; Champaign, IL	W 20–16	33,246	
September 26	Tulane*	Memorial Stadium; Champaign, IL	L 9–23	27,864	
October 3	Syracuse*	Memorial Stadium; Champaign, IL	W 27–0	39,357	
October 10	at Northwestern	Dyche Stadium; Evanston, IL (rivalry)	L 0–48	33,316	
October 17	Indiana	Memorial Stadium; Champaign, IL (rivalry)	L 24–30	42,708	
October 24	No. 1 Ohio State	Memorial Stadium; Champaign, IL (Illibuck)	L 29–48	46,208	
October 31	at Purdue	Ross–Ade Stadium; West Lafayette, IN (rivalry)	W 23–21	67,747	
November 7	at No. 5 Michigan	Michigan Stadium; Ann Arbor, MI (rivalry)	L 0–42	70,781	
November 14	Wisconsin	Memorial Stadium; Champaign, IL	L 17–29	36,569	
November 21	at Iowa	Iowa Stadium; Iowa City, IA	L 16–22	38,700	
*Non-conference game; Rankings from AP Poll released prior to the game

== Game summaries ==
=== Oregon ===
Team	1	2	3	4	Total
Oregon	0	7	0	9	16
• Illinois	0	10	7	3	20

- Date: September 19
- Location: Memorial Stadium

Scoring summary
Q2	4:36	ILL	Wells 1 yard run (Wells kick)	ILL 7–0
Q2	1:37	ORE	Newland 95 yard pass from Blanchard (Woody kick)	Tie 7–7
Q2	0:01	ILL	Wells 37 yard field goal	ILL 10–7
Q3	12:51	ILL	Dieken 26 yard pass from Wells (Wells kick)	ILL 17–7
Q4	9:49	ILL	Wells 22 yard field goal	ILL 20–7
Q4	4:30	ORE	Marshall 24 yard run (Woody kick)	ILL 20–14
Q4	1:45	ORE	Safety, Wells tackled by Reeves in end zone	ILL 20–16

== Roster ==
1970 Illinois Fighting Illini football team roster
Players
Coaches
Offense

Pos.	#	Name	Class
TE	82	Doug Dieken	Sr
OT	54	Larry McCarren	So
WR	26	Willie Osley	So
WR	88	Mike Pickering	Jr
QB	12	Mike Wells	So

Defense

Pos.	#	Name	Class
LB	52	Larry Allen	So
S	29	Steve Allen	Sr
MG	66	Steve Ross	So
DT	67	Dan Rotzoll	Jr
DE	31	Jim Rucks	So
S	23	Mike Ryan	Sr
DT	71	George Samojedny	Jr
MG	51	Veto Santini	Jr
DT	90	Jim Welsh	Jr
DB	21	Gary Windy	So
S	35	Bob Wintermute	Sr
LB	55	John Wiza	So
MG	59	David Wright	So
DB	41	Rich Wright	Jr

Special teams

Pos.	#	Name	Class

Head coach

- Jim Valek

Coordinators/assistant coaches

Legend

- (C) Team captain
- (S) Suspended
- (I) Ineligible
- Injured
- Redshirt

Roster
