= 1970 Minnesota Golden Gophers football team =

American college football season

1970 Minnesota Golden Gophers football
- Conference: Big Ten Conference
- Record: 3–6–1 (2–4–1 Big Ten)
- Head coach: Murray Warmath (17th season)
- MVP: Jeff Wright
- Captain: Jeff Wright
- Home stadium: Memorial Stadium

1970 Big Ten Conference football standings
| | Conf. | | | | | Overall |
| Team | W | | L | | T | W | | L | | T |
|---|---|---|---|---|---|---|---|---|---|---|
| No. 5 Ohio State $ | 7 | – | 0 | – | 0 | 9 | – | 1 | – | 0 |
| No. 9 Michigan | 6 | – | 1 | – | 0 | 9 | – | 1 | – | 0 |
| Northwestern | 6 | – | 1 | – | 0 | 6 | – | 4 | – | 0 |
| Iowa | 3 | – | 3 | – | 1 | 3 | – | 6 | – | 1 |
| Wisconsin | 3 | – | 4 | – | 0 | 4 | – | 5 | – | 1 |
| Michigan State | 3 | – | 4 | – | 0 | 4 | – | 6 | – | 0 |
| Minnesota | 2 | – | 4 | – | 1 | 3 | – | 6 | – | 1 |
| Purdue | 2 | – | 5 | – | 0 | 4 | – | 6 | – | 0 |
| Illinois | 1 | – | 6 | – | 0 | 3 | – | 7 | – | 0 |
| Indiana | 1 | – | 6 | – | 0 | 1 | – | 9 | – | 0 |
$ – Conference champion; Rankings from AP Poll

The 1970 Minnesota Golden Gophers football team represented the University of Minnesota in the 1970 Big Ten Conference football season. In their 17th year under head coach Murray Warmath, the Golden Gophers compiled a 3–6–1 record and were outscored by their opponents by a combined total of 237 to 180.

Defensive back Jeff Wright received the team's Most Valuable Player award. Linebacker Bill Light and Wright were named All-Big Ten first team. Offensive tackle Alvin Hawes, running back Barry Mayer and safety Walt Bowser were named All-Big Ten second team. Mayer was named an Academic All-American. Mayer was also named Academic All-Big Ten. The team included offensive lineman, Richard Fliehr, better known as professional wrestler Ric Flair.

Total attendance at five home games was 225,468, which averaged to 45,093. The largest crowd was against Nebraska. 1970 was the first season Memorial Stadium had a Tartan Turf surface.

== Schedule ==
| Date | Time | Opponent | Site | Result | Attendance | Source |
|---|---|---|---|---|---|---|
| September 19 | | at No. 10 Missouri* | Faurot Field; Columbia, MO | L 12–34 | 57,200 | |
| September 26 | 1:32 p.m. | Ohio* | Memorial Stadium; Minneapolis, MN | W 49–7 | 39,593 | |
| October 3 | | No. 6 Nebraska* | Memorial Stadium; Minneapolis, MN (rivalry) | L 10–35 | 52,287 | |
| October 10 | | Indiana | Memorial Stadium; Minneapolis, MN | W 23–0 | 40,220 | |
| October 17 | | at No. 1 Ohio State | Ohio Stadium; Columbus, OHN | L 8–28 | 86,667 | |
| October 24 | | at No. 5 Michigan | Michigan Stadium; Ann Arbor, MI (Little Brown Jug) | L 13–39 | 83,496 | |
| October 31 | | Iowa | Memorial Stadium; Minneapolis, MN (rivalry) | T 14–14 | 51,345 | |
| November 7 | | at Northwestern | Dyche Stadium; Evanston, IL | L 14–28 | 33,437 | |
| November 14 | | Michigan State^{†} | Memorial Stadium; Minneapolis, MN | W 23–13 | 42,834 | |
| November 21 | | at Wisconsin | Camp Randall Stadium; Madison, WI (rivalry) | L 14–39 | 50,167 | |
*Non-conference game; ^{†}Homecoming; Rankings from AP Poll released prior to the game; All times are in Central time

== Roster ==
1970 Minnesota Golden Gophers football team roster
Players
Coaches
Offense

| Pos. | # | Name | Class |
|---|---|---|---|
| OT | 76 | Bart Buetow | Jr |
| QB | 10 | Craig Curry | Jr |
| WR | 80 | Kevin Hamm | Jr |
| OT | 78 | Alvin Ray Hawes | Sr |
| RB | 48 | Jim Henry | So |
| OT | 72 | Matt Herkenhoff | Fr |
| TE | 83 | Doug Kingsriter | So |
| OT | 75 | Dennis Maloney | So |
| RB | 25 | John Marquesen | Jr |
| QB | 19 | Mike Mason | So |
| RB | 38 | Barry Mayer | Sr |
| G | 62 | Paul Tollefson | So |
| G | 65 | Richard Tyree | So |
| C | 53 | Bob Veldman | So |

Defense

| Pos. | # | Name | Class |
|---|---|---|---|
| DB | 16 | Bob Bjorklund | So |
| DB | 11 | Walter Bowser | Sr |
| DT | 72 | Michael Goldberg | Sr |
| DE | 58 | Tom Lavaty | Sr |
| LB | 50 | Bill Light | Jr |
| LB | 33 | Tom MacLeod | So |
| DT | 71 | James O'Brien | Sr |
| DB | 23 | Mike Perfetti | Jr |
| DB | 42 | Maurice Rhodes | Jr |
| DT | 73 | Albert Richmond | So |
| DB | 34 | Joseph Scheitlin | So |
| DT | 69 | Clayton Scheuer | So |
| DT | 96 | Tim Setterquist | Jr |
| DE | 85 | John Shannon | So |
| DT | 70 | Steve Thompson | Sr |
| DB | 27 | Jeff Wright | Sr |
| SS | 26 | Paul Wright | So |

Special teams

| Pos. | # | Name | Class |
|---|---|---|---|
| LS | 39 | Steve Goldberg | Fr |

Head coach

- Murray Warmath

Coordinators/assistant coaches

Legend

- (C) Team captain
- (S) Suspended
- (I) Ineligible
- Injured
- Redshirt

Roster
