= 1970 Indiana Hoosiers football team =

American college football season

1970 Indiana Hoosiers football
- Conference: Big Ten Conference
- Record: 1–9 (1–6 Big Ten)
- Head coach: John Pont (6th season)
- MVP: Chris Morris
- Captains: Tom Fleming; E. G. White
- Home stadium: Seventeenth Street Stadium

1970 Big Ten Conference football standings
	Conf.					Overall
Team	W		L		T	W		L		T
No. 5 Ohio State $	7	–	0	–	0	9	–	1	–	0
No. 9 Michigan	6	–	1	–	0	9	–	1	–	0
Northwestern	6	–	1	–	0	6	–	4	–	0
Iowa	3	–	3	–	1	3	–	6	–	1
Wisconsin	3	–	4	–	0	4	–	5	–	1
Michigan State	3	–	4	–	0	4	–	6	–	0
Minnesota	2	–	4	–	1	3	–	6	–	1
Purdue	2	–	5	–	0	4	–	6	–	0
Illinois	1	–	6	–	0	3	–	7	–	0
Indiana	1	–	6	–	0	1	–	9	–	0
$ – Conference champion; Rankings from AP Poll

The 1970 Indiana Hoosiers football team represented the Indiana Hoosiers in the 1970 Big Ten Conference football season. The Hoosiers played their home games at Seventeenth Street Stadium in Bloomington, Indiana. The team was coached by John Pont, in his sixth year as head coach of the Hoosiers.

== Schedule ==
Date	Time	Opponent	Site	Result	Attendance	Source
September 19		Colorado*	Seventeenth Street Stadium; Bloomington, IN	L 9–16	42,471	
September 26	4:31 p.m.	at California*	California Memorial Stadium; Berkeley, CA	L 14–56	30,000	
October 3		No. 14 West Virginia*	Seventeenth Street Stadium; Bloomington, IN	L 10–16	44,882	
October 10		at Minnesota	Memorial Stadium; Minneapolis, MN	L 0–23	40,220	
October 17		at Illinois	Memorial Stadium; Champaign, IL (rivalry)	W 30–24	42,708	
October 24	1:30 pm	Wisconsin^{†}	Seventeenth Street Stadium; Bloomington, IN	L 12–30	48,643	
October 31		Michigan State	Seventeenth Street Stadium; Bloomington, IN (rivalry)	L 7–32	41,426	
November 7		at Iowa	Iowa Stadium; Iowa City, IA	L 13–42	43,217	
November 14		Northwestern	Seventeenth Street Stadium; Bloomington, IN	L 7–21	25,778	
November 21		at Purdue	Ross–Ade Stadium; West Lafayette, IN (Old Oaken Bucket)	L 0–40	69,357	
*Non-conference game; ^{†}Homecoming; Rankings from AP Poll released prior to the game; All times are in Eastern time

== Roster ==
1970 Indiana Hoosiers football team roster
Players
Coaches
Offense

Pos.	#	Name	Class
TE	88	John Andrews
OL	72	Tom Bove
QB	14	Greg Brown
G	78	Steve Brown
WR	80	Charley Byrnes
WR	83	Mike Clark
TE	98	Roger Davidson
RB	30	Rob Decker
WR	85	Doug Finlayson
RB	18	Dan Grossman
RB	44	Greg Harvey
QB	11	Mike Heizman
RB	17	Rick Hoffman
OL	67	Tom Kruyer
OL	66	Keith Morran
OL	64	Chris Morris
QB	10	Ted McNulty	So
RB	12	John Motil
RB	31	Hank Pogue
WR	87	Glenn Scolnik
RB	15	Rick Thompson
C	62	E. G. White

Defense

Pos.	#	Name	Class
LB	38	Don Casselman
DT	77	John Debbout
DB	49	Alan Dick
DB	20	Mark Findley
LB	35	Tom Fleming
LB	47	Mike Fulk
DT	55	Bob Jones
DB	40	Dan Lintner
DL	82	Ed Maguire
LB	37	Vic Malinovsky
DE	97	Tim Merrell
LB	39	Rob Spicer
S	46	Steve Porter
DB	43	Dave Reider
DT	99	Tim Robinson
DB	22	Scott Shuey
LB	36	Chuck Thomson
DT	75	Bob White
DE	84	Jerry Wiseman

Special teams

Pos.	#	Name	Class
K	3	Chris Gartner	So

Head coach

- John Pont

Coordinators/assistant coaches

Legend

- (C) Team captain
- (S) Suspended
- (I) Ineligible
- Injured
- Redshirt

== 1971 NFL draftees ==
Player	Position	Round	Pick	NFL club
John Andrews	Tight end	5	130	Baltimore Colts
Chris Morris	Guard	10	258	Minnesota Vikings
