= 1970 Purdue Boilermakers football team =

American college football season

1970 Purdue Boilermakers football
- Conference: Big Ten Conference
- Record: 4–6 (2–5 Big Ten)
- Head coach: Bob DeMoss (1st season)
- MVP: Stan Brown
- Captains: Donnie Green; Veno Paraskevas
- Home stadium: Ross–Ade Stadium

1970 Big Ten Conference football standings
| | Conf. | | | | | Overall |
| Team | W | | L | | T | W | | L | | T |
|---|---|---|---|---|---|---|---|---|---|---|
| No. 5 Ohio State $ | 7 | – | 0 | – | 0 | 9 | – | 1 | – | 0 |
| No. 9 Michigan | 6 | – | 1 | – | 0 | 9 | – | 1 | – | 0 |
| Northwestern | 6 | – | 1 | – | 0 | 6 | – | 4 | – | 0 |
| Iowa | 3 | – | 3 | – | 1 | 3 | – | 6 | – | 1 |
| Wisconsin | 3 | – | 4 | – | 0 | 4 | – | 5 | – | 1 |
| Michigan State | 3 | – | 4 | – | 0 | 4 | – | 6 | – | 0 |
| Minnesota | 2 | – | 4 | – | 1 | 3 | – | 6 | – | 1 |
| Purdue | 2 | – | 5 | – | 0 | 4 | – | 6 | – | 0 |
| Illinois | 1 | – | 6 | – | 0 | 3 | – | 7 | – | 0 |
| Indiana | 1 | – | 6 | – | 0 | 1 | – | 9 | – | 0 |
$ – Conference champion; Rankings from AP Poll

The 1970 Purdue Boilermakers football team represented Purdue University in the 1970 Big Ten Conference football season. Led by first-year head coach Bob DeMoss, the Boilermakers compiled an overall record of 4–6 with a mark of 2–5 in conference play, placing eighth in the Big Ten. This was Purdue's first losing season since the 1956 season. The team played home games at Ross–Ade Stadium in West Lafayette, Indiana.

== Schedule ==
| Date | Opponent | Site | Result | Attendance | Source |
|---|---|---|---|---|---|
| September 19 | TCU* | Ross–Ade Stadium; West Lafayette, IN | W 15–0 | 65,808 | |
| September 26 | at No. 6 Notre Dame* | Notre Dame Stadium; Notre Dame, IN (rivalry) | L 0–48 | 59,075 | |
| October 3 | at No. 3 Stanford* | Stanford Stadium; Stanford, CA | W 26–14 | 62,000 | |
| October 10 | No. 7 Michigan | Ross–Ade Stadium; West Lafayette, IN | L 0–29 | 69,021 | |
| October 17 | at Iowa | Iowa Stadium; Iowa City, IA | W 24–3 | 56,973 | |
| October 24 | at Northwestern | Dyche Stadium; Evanston, IL | L 14–38 | 38,722 | |
| October 31 | Illinois^{†} | Ross–Ade Stadium; West Lafayette, IN (rivalry) | L 21–23 | 67,747 | |
| November 7 | at Michigan State | Spartan Stadium; East Lansing, MI | L 14–24 | 61,113 | |
| November 14 | Ohio State | Ross–Ade Stadium; West Lafayette, IN | L 7–10 | 68,157 | |
| November 21 | Indiana | Ross–Ade Stadium; West Lafayette, IN (Old Oaken Bucket) | W 40–0 | 69,357 | |
*Non-conference game; ^{†}Homecoming; Rankings from AP Poll released prior to the game

== Game summaries ==
=== TCU ===
- Otis Armstrong, 22 rushes, 100 yards

=== Stanford ===
| Team | 1 | 2 | 3 | 4 | Total |
|---|---|---|---|---|---|
| • Purdue | 16 | 0 | 7 | 3 | 26 |
| Stanford | 0 | 0 | 7 | 7 | 14 |

- Date: October 3
- Location: Stanford Stadium, Stanford, CA
- Game attendance: 62,000

Scoring summary
| Q1 | | PUR | Piebes 3 yard run (Jones kick) | PUR 7–0 |
| Q1 | | PUR | Safety, Kauffman tackled in end zone | PUR 9–0 |
| Q1 | | PUR | Brown 9 yard run (Jones kick) | PUR 16–0 |
| Q3 | 8:26 | STAN | Plunkett 1 yard run (Horowitz kick) | PUR 16–6 |
| Q3 | | PUR | Brown 4 yard run (Jones kick) | PUR 23–6 |
| Q4 | | PUR | Jones 33 yard field goal | PUR 26–6 |
| Q4 | | STAN | Brown 44 yard pass from Plunkett (Horowitz kick) | PUR 26–13 |

Purdue intercepted Stanford quarterback Jim Plunkett five times.

- Otis Armstrong 27 rushes, 120 yards

=== Iowa ===
- Otis Armstrong 25 rushes, 164 yards

=== Ohio State ===
Ohio State Buckeyes (7–0) at Purdue Boilermakers

| Quarter | 1 | 2 | 3 | 4 | Total |
|---|---|---|---|---|---|
| Ohio St | 7 | 0 | 0 | 3 | 10 |
| Purdue | 7 | 0 | 0 | 0 | 7 |

at Ross–Ade Stadium, West Lafayette, Indiana

- Date: November 14, 1970
- Game time: 1:00 p.m.
- Game weather: Overcast, 37 °F (3 °C)
- Game attendance: 68,157
- Box Score

Game information

First quarter

- OSU – John Brockington 26-yard run (Fred Schram kick), 2:13. Ohio St 7–0. Drive: 6 plays, 71 yards.
- PUR – Stan Brown 96-yard kickoff return (Jeff Jones kick), 2:01. Tie 7–7.

Fourth quarter

- OSU – Fred Schram 30-yard field goal, 2:04. Ohio St 10–7. Drive: 7 plays, 66 yards.

Top passers

- OSU – Ron Maciejowski – 1/3, 52 yards
- PUR – Gary Danielson – 2/12, 17 yards, 2 INT

Top rushers

- OSU – John Brockington – 24 rushes, 136 yards, TD
- PUR – Otis Armstrong – 20 rushes, 94 yards

Top receivers

- OSU – Bruce Jankowski – 1 reception, 52 yards
- PUR – Stan Brown – 1 reception, 9 yards

=== Indiana ===
- Otis Armstrong 23 rushes, 168 yards

== Roster ==
1970 Purdue Boilermakers football team roster
Players
Coaches
Offense

| Pos. | # | Name | Class |
|---|---|---|---|
| RB | | Otis Armstrong |
| TE | | Ashley Bell |
| WR | | Stan Brown |
| TE | | Mike Cota |
| QB | 18 | Gary Danielson | So |
| OT | | Paul DeNuccio |
| OT | | Donnie Green (C) |
| G | | Tim Huxhold |
| QB, K | | Jeff Jones |
| G | | Tom Luken |
| FB | | Ron North |
| QB | | Chuck Piebes |
| WR | | Darryl Stingley |
| C | | Kenneth Watkins |

Defense

| Pos. | # | Name | Class |
|---|---|---|---|
| MG | | Gregg Bingham |
| CB | | Sam Carter |
| DB | | Randy Cooper |
| DT | | Alex Davis |
| S | | Steve deGrandmaison |
| DE | | John Handy |
| DE | | Gary Hrivnak |
| DT | | Ron Maree |
| DB | | Mike McDaniel |
| MG | | Doug Molls |
| LB | 99 | Vero Paraskevas (C) | Sr |
| CB | | Charlie Potts |
| LB | | Jim Teal |
| DE | | Rick Tekavec |

Special teams

| Pos. | # | Name | Class |
|---|---|---|---|
| P | | Scott Lougheed |

Head coach

- Bob DeMoss

Coordinators/assistant coaches

- Bob Geiger
- Allen Hager
- C.W. Hewgley
- Wayne Jones
- Ned Maloney
- Tony Mason
- Ron Meyer
- Al Parker
- Tom Roggeman
- Dale Samuels

Legend

- (C) Team captain
- (S) Suspended
- (I) Ineligible
- Injured
- Redshirt
