= Fritz Seyferth =

American football player (born 1950)

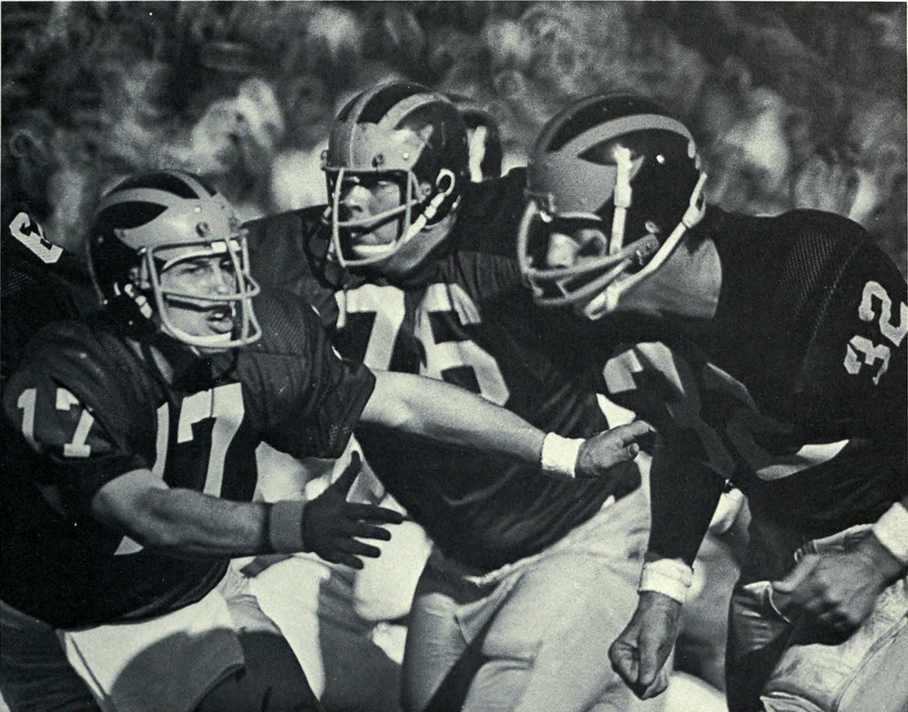
- Seyferth (No. 32 at right) with teammates Tom Slade and Jim Brandstatter

Profile
- Position: Fullback

Personal information
- Born: May 18, 1950 (age 76); Darien, Connecticut, U.S.
- Listed height: 6 ft 3 in (1.91 m)
- Listed weight: 215 lb (98 kg)

Career information
- High school: Darien
- College: Michigan
- NFL draft: 1972: 17th round, 419th overall pick

Career history
- Calgary Stampeders (1972–1973)

John Frederick "Fritz" Seyferth Jr. (born May 18, 1950) is an American former gridiron football player. He played college football at the University of Michigan from 1969 to 1971. He also played professional football for the Calgary Stampeders in the Canadian Football League (CFL) from 1972 to 1973. He later worked for 21 years for the University of Michigan Athletic Department, retiring in 2000 as the executive associate athletic director.

== University of Michigan ==
A native of Darien, Connecticut, Seyferth was reportedly "a good, but not great football player" in high school. In 1968, he enrolled at the University of Michigan as an engineering student and not as a scholarship athlete. He tried out for the Michigan Wolverines football team as a walk-on and made the roster of the 1969 team led by first-year head coach Bo Schembechler. He ultimately earned a scholarship as well.

Seyferth started seven games at fullback and one at left halfback for the 1970 Michigan team that finished the season with a 9–1 record and ranked No. 7 and No. 9 in the final UPI and AP polls. On October 3, 1970, in Michigan's 14–7 victory over Texas A&M, he gained 45 yards on seven carries during the game-winning drive in the fourth quarter. Three weeks later, on October 24, 1970, he scored four touchdowns in a 39–13 victory over Minnesota. He finished the 1970 season with 333 rushing yards and scored eight touchdowns, including two touchdown catches. He ranked third in the Big Ten Conference in scoring.

Following the 1970 season, Seyferth won accolades for the work ethic that allowed him to progress from a walk-on to one of the top scorers in the Big Ten. Bo Schembechler noted, "It's pretty obvious he wants to play. His determination is something to see". John Hannen, sports editor of the Toledo Blade, wrote:

Seyferth responds to a challenge and he wants very badly to play football ... It's like David conquering Goliath all over again. It's great, that's what it is."

As a senior, Seyferth started all 12 games for the 1971 Michigan team that finished the regular season with a perfect 11–0 record before losing by one point to Stanford in the 1972 Rose Bowl. The Rose Bowl was Seyferth's final game for Michigan, and he scored the Wolverines' only touchdown on a one-yard run in the fourth quarter. Seyferth's touchdown gave Michigan a 10–3 lead, but Stanford scored 10 points in the fourth quarter and won the game. With the development of Billy Taylor as a star in 1971, Seyferth's role at fullback was principally as a blocker. He helped lead the way as Taylor rushed for 1,297 yards and became Michigan's all-time career leader in rushing yardage. Seyferth also rushed for 194 yards and five touchdowns on 55 carries.

While attending Michigan, Seyferth served as the treasurer of the Druids Senior Literary Society and maintained a "consistently high grade point average" in Michigan's engineering program while also competing in football. In December 1972, Seyferth received the Besser-Lindsey Award from Sigma Alpha Epsilon "in recognition of achievement in scholarship, fraternity and athletics."

== Professional football ==
Seyferth was selected by the New York Giants in the 17th round (419th overall pick) of the 1972 NFL draft. He remained part of the Giants team during the 1972 pre-season and exhibition games, but he was cut at the end of August, before the start of the regular season. He was then signed by the Calgary Stampeders of the Canadian Football League. In his first game for Calgary on September 10, 1972, he gained 38 rushing yards, caught five passes for 72 yards and scored a touchdown. He also was credited with "80 hard earned yards and some crunching blocks" in an October 1, 1972 victory over the Saskatchewan Roughriders. He finished the 1972 season as the Stampeders' second leading rusher with 283 yards on 67 carries. He also caught 16 passes for 216 yards. He continued to play for the Stampeders in 1973, but retired from professional football at the end of the season.

== Later life ==
Seyferth was married to Lynn Groves in 1973. They met while both were students at the University of Michigan.

After retiring from football, Seyferth worked for Arthur Young & Company. He later returned to Ann Arbor and worked for the University of Michigan Athletic Department for 21 years. He was the recruiting director for the Michigan football team in the 1980s and led the campaign to raise $12 million for the program's new building. He later served as Michigan's assistant athletic director during the 1990s. In 1998, he became the No. 2 person in Michigan's athletic department. He retired in January 2000 as the executive associate athletic director.

After retiring from the University of Michigan, Seyferth formed a consulting firm known as Fritz Seyferth & Associates.
