= Henry Hill (American football) =

American football player (born 1948)

Profile
- Position: Guard

Personal information
- Born: October 31, 1948 (age 78); Detroit, Michigan, U.S.
- Listed height: 5 ft 10 in (1.78 m)
- Listed weight: 200 lb (91 kg)

Career information
- High school: M.L. King HS (Detroit)
- College: Michigan

Career history
- 1968–1970: Michigan

Awards and highlights
- First-team All-American (1970); First-team All-Big Ten (1970); 2× Second-team All-Big Ten (1968, 1969); Most Valuable Player, 1970 Michigan Wolverines football team

Henry Hill (born October 31, 1948) is an American former football player, who played at the defensive guard position as a walk-on for the University of Michigan from 1968 to 1970. He was chosen as the co-captain and Most Valuable Player on the 1970 Michigan Wolverines football team and a first-team All-American that same year.

== Early life ==
A native of Detroit, Michigan, Hill is the youngest child in a family of five boys and two girls. He attended Detroit's Martin Luther King High School where he played football at the tight end position.

== University of Michigan ==
=== Walk-on status ===
Because of his size, Hill was not heavily recruited by major college teams. Interviewed in 1970, Hill recalled, "I was a tight end in high school and I didn't get many scholarship offers because my size was marginal. You don't see too many 5-10 tight ends around." Hill enrolled at the University of Michigan on a Michigan Opportunity Grant, a scholarship offered to under-privileged students with strong academic backgrounds. Interviewed by a reporter from the UPI in 1969, Hill said, "It's an academic scholarship. One of those kind they give to ghetto kids. My family was too poor to send me to school."

Hill tried out for the Michigan football team at the invitation of George Mans, Michigan's offensive ends coach. He recalled that, during his try-out, they threw a ball to him, and the ball bounced off his head, resulting in his being converted into a lineman. He played briefly for Michigan's freshman football team in 1967 but quit midway through the season to concentrate on his studies.

=== 1968 season ===
In the spring of 1968, Hill tried out for Michigan's varsity football team. He made the cut and was listed as a fourth-string defensive lineman at the conclusion of spring practice. Damer recalled, "I just stuck it out, figuring I'd get to play some."

By the time the 1968 football season began, Hill had been promoted to second-string status. The coaching staff was impressed by Hill's quickness, and he played in all 10 games for the 1968 team, including 7 games as the starting middle guard. His rise in 1968 from the fourth-string to starter was so rapid that his picture did not appear in the team's 1968 game program. The Toledo Blade in October 1968 ran a feature story on Hill and noted: "At 5-10, 200 pounds, Henry isn't big enough to play Big 10 football. Try telling that to Henry. ... Hill is a walk-on (non-scholarship) who made it big for the Wolverines. He's small, but he is tough, and he loves to play football." Hill finished the 1968 season as one of Michigan's statistical leaders on defense with 72 tackles, including 50 solo tackles and 16 tackles for loss.

=== 1969 season ===
In 1969, Hill started all 11 games for the Wolverines at the middle guard position on defense and also started three games as a guard on offense. He led the team with 90 tackles during the 1969 season.

Hill was routinely double-teamed in 1969 and 1970. Michigan head coach Bo Schembechler said of Hill, "I don't think any team in the country can adequately contain Hill with one-on-one blocking." Hill expressed frustration at being double-teamed, but recognized its value to the team: "Sometimes, I'm even getting triple-teamed on the pass rush. But that's got to help our defense so it's okay with me. If they do that, it leaves eight or nine men to play offense and we have ten men to play defense." Hill was named United Press International's Midwest Lineman of the Week after recording nine solo tackles and two assists against Minnesota in 1969. Following the game, Hill explained to reporters "with a trace of incredulity" in his voice, "They didn't double team me."

In Michigan's rivalry game against Ohio State in 1969, he had 13 tackles, leading The Michigan Daily to note that Hill had demonstrated to his Ohio State counterpart, All-American Jim Stillwagon, "just who is the best middle guard in the conference."

=== 1970 season ===
Hill was selected as the defensive captain for the 1970 Michigan Wolverines football team, serving as co-captain with quarterback Don Moorhead. He started all 10 games as the Wolverines middle guard on defense and accumulated 69 tackles, including 12 tackles for loss. At the end of the 1970 season, Hill was selected by his teammate as the team's Most Valuable Player along with Don Moorhead. He was also selected by the Central Press Association in 1970 as a first-team All-American and by the Associated Press as a second-team All-American.

=== Reputation for quickness ===
Hill developed a reputation as one of the quickest players at his position, as reflected in the following comments from football reporters:

- Prior to the 1970 Rose Bowl, a Southern California newspaper said of Hill: "Quickness is his biggest asset. He is as fast as any player on the team, has great upper arm and shoulder strength and is strong enough to keep from being knocked out of a play."
- In November 1970, the Associated Press ran a feature story referring to Hill as a "cat-quick" middle guard whose "forte is superquick lateral movement."
- The Christian Science Monitor referred to Hill as "the 'unblockable' middle guard Henry Hill."
- The Chicago Tribune wrote, "Tho not physically imposing at 5-11 and 220 pounds, he uses great quickness to blow past a blocker."

When Bo Schembechler took over as Michigan's coach in 1969, Hill acknowledged being "a little overweight" at 223 pounds. When Hill told the new coach he could run 40 yards in 4.6 seconds, Schembechler said, "Aw come on, you're kidding me." To Schembechler's surprise, Hill proceeded to run the 40 in 4.6 seconds.

Hill was not selected in the 1971 NFL draft, and the omission of the "cat-quick" middle guard was reported as one of the "conspicuous absences from the draft lists." Hill noted that he didn't expect to get drafted, although he added he would like a chance to become pro.
