= Pete Newell (gridiron football) =

American gridiron football player (born 1949)

Profile
- Position: Defensive tackle

Personal information
- Born: March 9, 1949 (age 77); Illinois, U.S.

Career information
- College: Michigan
- NFL draft: 1971: 5th round

Career history
- BC Lions (1971)

Awards and highlights
- First-team All-Big Ten (1970)

Peter Newell (born March 9, 1949) is an American former professional football defensive tackle. He played college football for the University of Michigan from 1968 to 1970. He was selected by the Detroit Lions in the 1971 NFL draft, but played professional football for the BC Lions in 1971.

== Michigan ==
Newell played college football for the University of Michigan from 1968 to 1970. As a junior, he was the leading tackler for the 1969 Michigan Wolverines football team with a total of 70 tackles. The 1969 team was the first Michigan team to be coached by Bo Schembechler. It defeated the No. 1 ranked Ohio State Buckeyes to advance to the 1970 Rose Bowl. Newell had 14 tackles in the Rose Bowl, tied for second most on the team.

Newell was politically active while at Michigan. During the fall of 1969, he was faced with a choice between traveling with the Michigan football team to Iowa for a football game scheduled for November 15, 1969, or traveling to Washington, D.C., to be part of the Moratorium to End the War in Vietnam, an antiwar protest that attracted over 500,000 demonstrators on the same day. After Newell chose to travel with the team, Schembechler praised him in his comments to the team for being "out there in Iowa City with the rest of the team, and not in Washington with the damn hippies where he really wanted to be."

As a senior, Newell started at right defensive tackle in nine of the ten games played by the 1970 Michigan Wolverines football team. That team finished the season with a 9-1 record and allowed opponents to score a total of only 90 points, an average of nine points per game. On October 3, 1970, Newell had a career-high 15 tackles and a fumble recovery in Michigan's 14-10 victory over Texas A&M. He had 123 career tackles in his three years at Michigan.

At the end of the 1970 season, Newell was selected as a first-team All-Big Ten Conference player by both the AP and UPI. He also played for the North team in the America Bowl All-Star football game in January 1971.

== Professional football ==
In January 1971, Newell was selected by the Detroit Lions in the fifth round (125th overall pick) of the 1971 NFL draft. However, he did not appear in any regular season NFL games. In September 1971, the BC Lions of the Canadian Football League announced that they were giving Newell a five-day tryout. After the trial period, he was activated by the Lions. He appeared in one game for the Lions and was released on September 24, 1971.

== Later life ==
After retiring from football, Newell returned to the Chicago area. He worked for 32 years in the financial services field for Smith Barney/Citigroup Global Markets, and he also served as the president of the Chicago Bond Club, the Children's Home and Aid Society of Illinois, and the University of Michigan Club of Chicago. He was also a member of the executive board of his alma mater, Notre Dame College Prep.

Newell is married to Nancy Newell. They have three sons, Peter, Kevin and Brian, who was first team all Catholic league for the Fenwick Friars.

In 2009, Newell was inducted into the Notre Dame College Prep Hall of Honor.
