= Marty Huff =

American gridiron football player (1948–2023)

No. 70
- Position: Linebacker

Personal information
- Born: December 19, 1948; Houston, Texas, U.S.
- Died: June 29, 2023 (aged 74); Toledo, Ohio, U.S.
- Listed height: 6 ft 2 in (1.88 m)
- Listed weight: 234 lb (106 kg)

Career information
- High school: St. Francis de Sales (Toledo, Ohio)
- College: Michigan (1968–1970)

Career history
- 1972: San Francisco 49ers
- 1973: Edmonton Eskimos
- 1974–1975: Charlotte Hornets

Awards and highlights
- First-team All-American (1970); 2× First-team All-Big Ten (1969, 1970)
- Stats at Pro Football Reference

Ralph Martin Huff (December 19, 1948 – June 29, 2023) was an American football linebacker. He played for the University of Michigan from 1968 to 1970. As a senior, he was selected as a first-team All-American by the American Football Coaches Association (AFCA). After graduating from Michigan, Huff played professional football for the San Francisco 49ers (1972), Edmonton Eskimos (1973), and Charlotte Hornets (1974–1975).

== Early life ==
Huff was born in Houston, Texas, in 1948, but he grew up in the Old West End of Toledo, Ohio. He was one of the five sons of Ralph and Martha Huff. Ralph Huff was an All-Indiana football player who attended Indiana University in the 1930s. Each of the five Huff sons played football at St. Francis de Sales High School in Toledo. Huff later recalled:

It was kind of crazy. I had two brothers who picked on me, but I had two other brothers to pick on. Dad was a pretty big guy, so we didn't mess around too much in the house. As far as football goes, Dad never forced the issue. If we didn't want to play, that was OK with him.

As a freshman at St. Francis de Sales, Huff was 6 feet, 2 inches tall, weighed 145 pounds, and had no intention to play football. He liked basketball, but the school's football coach, Dick Mattingly, persuaded Huff's brother to get Marty to try out for the team.

Huff became a multi-sport star at St. Francis de Sales. He received two varsity letters in basketball, four in track and three in football. In track, he won the City League discus and shot put championships and set a school record in the shot put with a throw of 59 feet, 2 inches.

He played fullback for the St. Francis de Sales and, along with his brother Andy Huff (who later starred for Notre Dame), led the team to a City League championship and a 10–0 record in 1966. That same year, Huff also set the school's single season record with 1,191 rushing yards, a record that stood for 10 years.

== University of Michigan ==
=== 1967 season ===
Huff enrolled at the University of Michigan on a football scholarship in 1967. He played fullback for the freshman team in 1967, but switched to linebacker in his sophomore year. He recalled the transition from fullback to linebacker as follows:

As a freshman you were there to be meat. One day in practice I'm playing fullback and, when I go out for a pass, this little linebacker named Dennis Morgan who had forearms like Popeye just about ripped my head off. Right then and there I said 'I want to be that guy, not this guy.' I had no problem switching to linebacker.

=== 1968 season ===
As a sophomore, Huff made his college football debut with the 1968 Michigan football team. In his first game for Michigan, a 31–10 victory over Duke in September 1968, Huff intercepted a pass and returned it 44 yards for a touchdown. He also accumulated 16 tackles and a fumble recovery in six games for the 1968 team.

=== 1969 season ===
As a junior, Huff started at linebacker in all 11 games for the 1969 Michigan Wolverines football team. He also started three games for the offense, two at right tackle and one at left halfback.

The 1969 team was the first Michigan team coached by Bo Schembechler. In Schembechler's first game as head coach, Huff returned a blocked punt 31 yards for a touchdown in a 42–14 win against Vanderbilt.

In an October 1969 game against Purdue, Huff intercepted three passes thrown by quarterback Mike Phipps (later inducted into the College Football Hall of Fame) to help Michigan win a close game, 31–30.

In November 1969, the Wolverines upset Ohio State, 24–12. Huff had 10 tackles in the game and later recalled it as his college highlight. He said, "They were a powerhouse and nobody gave us a chance. I think we took them by surprise. We were psyched up, in control but high as a kite. Everything clicked for us."

After the 1969 season, Huff was selected as a first-team All-Big Ten Conference player by the Associated Press.

=== 1970 season ===
Huff started all ten games at middle linebacker for the 1970 Michigan Wolverines football team that finished the season with a 9–1 record. Huff had 124 tackles, 5 interceptions, 85 interception return yards, and 4 pass break-ups in 1970.

After the 1970 season, Huff was selected as a first-team All-American by the American Football Coaches Association. He was also selected to play on the East All-Star team in the 1970 East–West Shrine Game.

=== Career statistics ===
In three years playing football at Michigan, Huff accumulated 266 tackles, nine pass interceptions, and 159 interception return yards.

== Professional football ==
Huff was selected by the San Francisco 49ers in the fifth round (127th overall pick) of the 1971 NFL draft. He appeared in three games for the 49ers during the 1972 NFL season.

In September 1973, the 49ers traded Huff to the Buffalo Bills. Huff opted to play for the Edmonton Eskimos of the Canadian Football League during the 1973 season.

In September 1974, Huff signed to play for the New York Stars in the new World Football League. Huff stayed with the team when it moved to Charlotte, North Carolina, and became the Charlotte Hornets. He played for Charlotte in the 1974 and 1975 seasons.

In April 1976, Huff signed with the Washington Redskins, but he did not play in the 1976 NFL regular season.

== Later years and family ==
In 1976, Huff moved to Rock Hill, South Carolina, where he started a stonemasonry business. He remained in that business for 16 years. In 1992, Huff moved to Temperance, Michigan, and became a supervisor at Toledo Molding & Die.

Huff has a daughter and two sons from his first marriage. His youngest son, Ben Huff, played linebacker at Michigan from 1993 to 1997 and with the Atlanta Falcons from 1998 to 1999.

Huff died in Toledo, Ohio, on June 29, 2023, at the age of 74.
