= 1970 Iowa Hawkeyes football team =

American college football season

1970 Iowa Hawkeyes football
- Conference: Big Ten Conference
- Record: 3–6–1 (3–3–1 Big Ten)
- Head coach: Ray Nagel (5th season)
- MVP: Dave Clement
- Captains: Ray Manning; Dan McDonald
- Home stadium: Iowa Stadium

1970 Big Ten Conference football standings
	Conf.					Overall
Team	W		L		T	W		L		T
No. 5 Ohio State $	7	–	0	–	0	9	–	1	–	0
No. 9 Michigan	6	–	1	–	0	9	–	1	–	0
Northwestern	6	–	1	–	0	6	–	4	–	0
Iowa	3	–	3	–	1	3	–	6	–	1
Wisconsin	3	–	4	–	0	4	–	5	–	1
Michigan State	3	–	4	–	0	4	–	6	–	0
Minnesota	2	–	4	–	1	3	–	6	–	1
Purdue	2	–	5	–	0	4	–	6	–	0
Illinois	1	–	6	–	0	3	–	7	–	0
Indiana	1	–	6	–	0	1	–	9	–	0
$ – Conference champion; Rankings from AP Poll

The 1970 Iowa Hawkeyes football team was an American football team that represented the University of Iowa as a member of the Big Ten Conference during the 1970 Big Ten football season. In their fifth and final year under head coach Ray Nagel, the Hawkeyes compiled a 3–6–1 record (3–3–1 in conference game), finished in fourth place in the Big Ten, and were outscored by a total of 259 to 129.

The 1970 Hawkeyes gained 1,935 rushing yards and 860 passing yards. On defense, they gave up 2,858 rushing yards and 1,146 passing yards.

The team's statistical leaders included Roy Bash (32-of-70 passing, 473 yards), Levi Mitchell (900 rushing yards), Kerry Reardon (27 receptions for 438 yards), Tim Sullivan (36 points scored), and Dave Clement (140 total tackles). Tight end Ray Manning and linebacker Dan McDonald were the team captains. Linebacker Dave Clement was selected as the team's most valuable player. Clement set a school record (still standing) with 29 tackles against Oregon State on September 19, 1970.

The team played its home games at Iowa Stadium in Iowa City, Iowa. Home attendance totaled 284,643, an average of 49,728 per game.

== Schedule ==
Date	Opponent	Site	Result	Attendance	Source
September 19	at Oregon State*	Civic Stadium; Portland, OR	L 14–21	23,279	
September 26	No. 7 USC*	Iowa Stadium; Iowa City, IA	L 0–48	56,131	
October 3	at Arizona*	Arizona Stadium; Tucson, AZ	L 10–17	37,500	
October 10	Wisconsin	Iowa Stadium; Iowa City, IA (rivalry)	W 24–14	53,622	
October 17	Purdue^{†}	Iowa Stadium; Iowa City, IA	L 3–24	56,973	
October 24	at Michigan State	Spartan Stadium; East Lansing, MI	L 0–37	63,482	
October 31	at Minnesota	Memorial Stadium; Minneapolis, MN (rivalry)	T 14–14	51,345	
November 7	Indiana	Iowa Stadium; Iowa City, IA	W 42–13	43,217	
November 14	at No. 5 Michigan	Michigan Stadium; Ann Arbor, MI	L 0–55	66,189	
November 21	Illinois	Iowa Stadium; Iowa City, IA	W 22–16	38,700	
*Non-conference game; ^{†}Homecoming; Rankings from AP Poll released prior to the game

== Game summaries ==
=== USC ===
USC at Iowa

Team	1	2	3	4	Total
• No. 7 Trojans	7	27	14	0	48
Hawkeyes	0	0	0	0	0

- Date: September 26
- Location: Iowa Stadium, Iowa City, Iowa
- Game attendance: 56,131

Scoring summary
1	USC	Jones 1-yard run (Ayala kick)	USC 7–0
2	USC	Davis 3-yard run (Ayala kick)	USC 14–0
2	USC	Jones 8-yard run (kick failed)	USC 20–0
2	USC	Chandler 9-yard pass from Jones (Dickerson pass from Jones)	USC 28–0
2	USC	Rae 4-yard run (run failed)	USC 34–0
3	USC	Harris 1-yard run (Ayala kick)	USC 41–0
3	USC	McNeill 4-yard run (Ayala kick)	USC 48–0

=== Wisconsin ===
Wisconsin at Iowa

Team	1	2	3	4	Total
Badgers	0	0	14	0	14
• Hawkeyes	7	7	7	3	24

- Date: October 10
- Location: Iowa Stadium, Iowa City, Iowa
- Game attendance: 53,622

Scoring summary
Q1	IOWA	Tim Sullivan 2 yard run (Marcos Melendez kick)	IOWA 7–0
Q2	IOWA	Levi Mitchell 4 yard run (Melendez kick)	IOWA 14–0
Q3	WIS	Neil Graff 16 yard run (pass failed)	IOWA 14–6
Q3	WIS	Larry Mialik 28 yard pass from Graff (Graff run)	Tie 14–14
Q3	IOWA	Sullivan 3 yard run (Melendez kick)	IOWA 21–14
Q4	IOWA	Melendez 31 yard field goal	IOWA 28–14

Iowa sophomore quarterback Kyle Skogman started his first game.

=== At Michigan ===
Iowa at Michigan

Team	1	2	3	4	Total
Hawkeyes	0	0	0	0	0
• No. 5 Wolverines	21	14	7	13	55

- Date: November 14
- Location: Michigan Stadium, Ann Arbor, Michigan
- Game attendance: 66,189

Scoring summary
1	MICH	Billy Taylor 1-yard run (Dana Coin kick)	MICH 7-0
1	MICH	Glenn Doughty 2-yard run (Coin kick)	MICH 14-0
1	MICH	Taylor 2-yard run (Coin kick)	MICH 21-0
2	MICH	Don Moorhead 24-yard run (Coin kick)	MICH 28-0
2	MICH	Fritz Seyferth 3-yard run (Coin kick)	MICH 35-0
3	MICH	Thom Darden recovered fumble in end zone (Coin kick)	MICH 42-0
4	MICH	Lance G. Scheffler 5-yard run (Coin kick)	MICH 49-0
4	MICH	David Zuccarelli 7-yard run (kick failed)	MICH 55-0

== Roster ==
1970 Iowa Hawkeyes football team roster
Players
Coaches
Offense

Pos.	#	Name	Class
QB	17	Roy Bash	Sr
C	51	Al Cassady	Sr
RB	44	Dennis Green	Sr
TE	82	Ray Manning	Sr
OT	77	Jim Miller	Sr
RB	10	Levi Mitchell	Jr
RB	29	Steve Penney	Jr
WR	22	Kerry Reardon	Sr
WR	47	Dave Triplett	Jr

Defense

Pos.	#	Name	Class
LB	53	Dave Clement	Sr
DB	43	Craig Clemons	Jr
DB	41	Tom Hayes	Sr
DE	90	Larry Horton	So
LB	85	Kenny Price	Sr
DT	65	Bill Windauer	So

Special teams

Pos.	#	Name	Class
K		Marcos Melendez

Head coach

- Ray Nagel

Coordinators/assistant coaches

Legend

- (C) Team captain
- (S) Suspended
- (I) Ineligible
- Injured
- Redshirt
