= Chuck Winfrey =

American football player (born 1949)

No. 36, 51
- Position: Linebacker

Personal information
- Born: March 27, 1949 (age 77); Chicago, Illinois, U.S.
- Listed height: 6 ft 0 in (1.83 m)
- Listed weight: 230 lb (104 kg)

Career information
- High school: DuSable (IL)
- College: Wisconsin
- NFL draft: 1971: undrafted

Career history
- Minnesota Vikings (1971); Pittsburgh Steelers (1972); Denver Broncos (1973)*; BC Lions (1974); Saskatchewan Roughriders (1974); Montreal Alouettes (1975)
- * Offseason or practice squad member only

Awards and highlights
- First-team All-Big Ten (1970)

Career NFL statistics
- Games played: 15
- Stats at Pro Football Reference

Chuck Winfrey (born March 27, 1949) is a former linebacker in the National Football League (NFL). Winfrey played the 1971 NFL season with the Minnesota Vikings. The following season, he was a member of the Pittsburgh Steelers.
