= Jim Teal =

American football player (1950–2021)

No. 57
- Position: Linebacker

Personal information
- Born: May 14, 1950; Baltimore, Maryland, U.S.
- Died: December 24, 2021 (aged 71); Farmington Hills, Michigan, U.S.
- Listed height: 6 ft 3 in (1.91 m)
- Listed weight: 225 lb (102 kg)

Career information
- High school: Boyden (NC)
- College: Purdue
- NFL draft: 1972: 10th round, 249th overall pick

Career history
- Detroit Lions (1973); Birmingham Americans (1974); Birmingham Vulcans (1975); Ottawa Rough Riders (1977)

Awards and highlights
- Second-team All-Big Ten (1970)
- Stats at Pro Football Reference

James Franklin Teal (May 14, 1950 – December 24, 2021) was an American football linebacker who played college football for Purdue (1969–1971) and professional football in the National Football League (NFL) for the Detroit Lions (1973), in the World Football League (WFL) for the Birmingham Americans/Birmingham Vulcans (1974-1975), and in the Canadian Football League (CFL) for the Ottawa Rough Riders (1977).

== Early life ==
Teal was born in 1950 in Baltimore, and attended Boyden High School in North Carolina. He played college football for the Purdue Boilermakers from 1969 to 1971.

== Professional football ==
He was drafted by the Detroit Lions in the tenth round (249th overall pick) of the 1972 NFL draft. He appeared in 14 games for the Lions in 1972, one of them as a starter. He later played in the World Football League (WFL) for the Birmingham Americans/Birmingham Vulcans during the 1974 and 1975 seasons and in the Canadian Football League (CFL) for the Ottawa Rough Riders in 1977.

== Later life ==
Teal died in December 2021 at age 71 in Farmington Hills, Michigan.
