= Jim DeLisle =

American football player (born 1949)

No. 79
- Position: Defensive tackle

Personal information
- Born: January 20, 1949 (age 77); Wausau, Wisconsin, U.S.
- Listed height: 6 ft 4 in (1.93 m)
- Listed weight: 255 lb (116 kg)

Career information
- High school: Newman Catholic (Wausau)
- College: Wisconsin
- NFL draft: 1971: undrafted

Career history
- Green Bay Packers (1971)

Awards and highlights
- Second-team All-Big Ten (1970)
- Stats at Pro Football Reference

James Roger DeLisle (born January 20, 1949) is an American former professional football player who was a defensive tackle for the Green Bay Packers of the National Football League (NFL). He played college football for the Wisconsin Badgers. After his football career, he and became a professor at the University of Washington.

== Football career ==
DeLisle graduated from Newman Catholic High School in Wausau, Wisconsin in 1967. He played college football for four seasons with the University of Wisconsin Badgers. In 1968, DeLisle set a school record with 4 recovered fumbles and led the team in tackles with 83 and again led the team in 1970 with 111 tackles. After a November 1968 game against Indiana, DeLisle won a team black helmet award for outstanding defensive play despite Wisconsin's 21-20 loss. DeLisle was a second-team All-Big Ten Conference selection in 1970. Not selected in the 1971 NFL draft, DeLisle played 9 games with the Green Bay Packers in 1971.

== Academic career ==
After earning a BBA in real estate in 1971 and MS in marketing research at the University of Wisconsin–Madison, DeLisle earned his Ph.D. in real estate and urban land economics from the University of Wisconsin–Madison in 1981. During the 1980s, DeLisle worked in various businesses and joined Prudential Real Estate Investors in 1987 and Equitable Real Estate in 1989. At both businesses, DeLisle helped establish investment research departments. In 2001, DeLisle became a professor at the University of Washington. At Washington, DeLisle established the master's program in real estate and became director of graduate real estate studies in 2008.
