= Jeff Wright (defensive back) =

American football player (born 1949)

No. 23
- Position: Safety

Personal information
- Born: June 13, 1949 (age 77); Edina, Minnesota, U.S.
- Listed height: 5 ft 11 in (1.80 m)
- Listed weight: 190 lb (86 kg)

Career information
- High school: Edina
- College: Minnesota
- NFL draft: 1971: 15th round, 388th overall pick

Career history
- Minnesota Vikings (1971–1977)

Awards and highlights
- First-team All-Big Ten (1970); Second-team All-Big Ten (1969)

Career NFL statistics
- Interceptions: 12
- Fumble recoveries: 9
- Sacks: 2
- Stats at Pro Football Reference

Jeff Ralph Wright (born June 13, 1949) is an American former professional football player who was a safety for the Minnesota Vikings of the National Football League (NFL) from 1971 to 1977, appearing in three Super Bowls. He finished his NFL career with 12 interceptions and 9 fumbles recovered in 82 regular season games. After graduating from Edina High School, Wright played college football for the Minnesota Golden Gophers, earning first-team All-Big Ten Conference honors in 1970. He was selected by his hometown team in 15th round of the 1971 NFL draft.
