= Rob Spicer (American football) =

American football player (1951-2021)

No. 59
- Position: Linebacker

Personal information
- Born: July 20, 1951; Detroit, Michigan, U.S.
- Died: April 13, 2021 (aged 69)
- Listed height: 6 ft 4 in (1.93 m)
- Listed weight: 238 lb (108 kg)

Career information
- High school: Thurston
- College: Indiana
- NFL draft: 1973: 9th round, 222nd overall pick

Career history
- New York Jets (1973); Chicago Fire (1974); New York Giants (1975)*; Denver Broncos (1975)*
- * Offseason or practice squad member only
- Stats at Pro Football Reference

Robin Edward Spicer (July 20, 1951 – April 13, 2021) was an American former professional football player who was a linebacker for the New York Jets of National Football League (NFL). He played college football for the Indiana University.
