= Gordon Bowdell =

American football player (born 1948)

No. 89
- Position: Wide receiver

Personal information
- Born: October 9, 1948 (age 78); Detroit, Michigan, U.S.
- Listed height: 6 ft 2 in (1.88 m)
- Listed weight: 203 lb (92 kg)

Career information
- High school: Cabrini (Allen Park, Michigan)
- College: Michigan State
- NFL draft: 1971: 7th round, 182nd overall pick

Career history
- Denver Broncos (1971)

Awards and highlights
- Second-team All-Big Ten (1970)
- Stats at Pro Football Reference

Gordon Bennett Bowdell III (born October 9, 1948) is an American former professional football player who was a wide receiver for the Denver Broncos of the National Football League (NFL). He played college football for the Michigan State Spartans.
