= Mike Sikich =

American football player (born 1949)

No. 68, 63
- Position: Guard

Personal information
- Born: March 3, 1949 (age 77); Chicago, Illinois, U.S.
- Listed height: 6 ft 2 in (1.88 m)
- Listed weight: 243 lb (110 kg)

Career information
- High school: Lyons Township
- College: Northwestern
- NFL draft: 1971: 11th round, 274th overall pick

Career history
- Cleveland Browns (1971); Chicago Fire (1974)

Awards and highlights
- Second-team All-American (1970); First-team All-Big Ten (1970)
- Stats at Pro Football Reference

Michael P. Sikich (born March 3, 1949) is an American former professional football player who was a guard for the Cleveland Browns of the National Football League (NFL). He played college football for the Northwestern Wildcats. He also played for the Chicago Fire of the World Football League (WFL).
