= Gail Clark =

American football player (1951–2026)

No. 53, 54
- Position: Linebacker

Personal information
- Born: April 14, 1951; Bellefontaine, Ohio, U.S.
- Died: July 3, 2026 (aged 75)
- Listed height: 6 ft 2 in (1.88 m)
- Listed weight: 226 lb (103 kg)

Career information
- High school: Bellefontaine
- College: Michigan State
- NFL draft: 1973: 4th round, 102nd overall pick

Career history
- Chicago Bears (1973); New England Patriots (1974); Toronto Argonauts (1976); Hamilton Tiger-Cats (1976)

Awards and highlights
- First-team All-Big Ten (1972)
- Stats at Pro Football Reference

Gail Allen Clark (April 14, 1951 – July 3, 2026) was an American professional football player who was a linebacker for the Chicago Bears and the New England Patriots of National Football League (NFL). He played college football for the Michigan State Spartans.

Clark died on July 3, 2026, at the age of 75.
