= Tirrel Burton =

American football player, coach, and broadcaster (1929–2017)

Biographical details
- Born: November 19, 1929; Oxford, Ohio, U.S.
- Died: January 17, 2017 (aged 87)

Playing career
- 1953–1955: Miami (OH)
- 1956: Ottawa Rough Riders
- Position: Halfback

Coaching career (HC unless noted)
- 1968: Central State (OH) (assistant)
- 1969: Miami (OH) (assistant)
- 1970–1991: Michigan (assistant)

Accomplishments and honors

Awards
- All-Mid-American Conference, 1955 (#1 vote recipient); AP All-Midwest Team, second team, 1955

Tirrel Burton (November 19, 1929 – January 17, 2017) was an American football player, coach, and radio broadcaster. He played halfback for Ara Parseghian's championship teams at Miami University in 1954 and 1955 and led the undefeated, untied 1955 team in rushing, scoring, pass interceptions, kickoff returns and punt returns, while breaking the university's all-time single-season scoring record. He played one year of professional football in 1956 for the Ottawa Rough Riders of the Canadian Football League. He was an assistant football coach at Central State University (1968), Miami University (1969) and the University of Michigan (1970–1991). He became a radio announcer for Michigan Wolverines football games on WUOM radio in 1994.

== Biography ==
=== Athlete at Miami University ===
After three-and-a-half years of military service, Burton enrolled at Miami University in Oxford, Ohio. Miami's head football coach at the time, Ara Parseghian, recruited Burton to Miami. Parseghian recalled, "He had tremendous speed and we were anxious to have him. He could break the line. That's what every coach looks for." Burton became a two-sport star at Miami, lettering three years each in both football and track from 1953 to 1955. As a halfback on Parseghian's football teams, Burton helped lead Miami to Mid-American Conference championships in both 1954 and 1955. The 1955 team compiled a perfect 9-0 record, and Burton led the team in rushing (722 yards in 82 carries), scoring (84 points), pass interceptions (4), kickoff returns (3 for 68 yards) and punt returns (14 for 216 yards). Burton's 84 points in 1955 (14 touchdowns in nine games) broke the school's single-season scoring record. His average of 7.2 yards per carry also set a new school record. At the conclusion of the 1955 season, Burton received more votes than any other player on the All-Mid-American Conference team. He was also selected by Associated Press for its second-team All-Midwestern team behind first-team selection Howard "Hopalong" Cassidy.

Despite its undefeated, untied record, the 1955 Miami football team was not invited to a post-season bowl game, leading the university's president, John D. Millet, to state publicly that he believed "Southern 'social customs'" may have blocked a post-season football bowl bid. An anonymous university of official stated, "That's a roundabout way of saying we weren't chosen because we have colored boys on our squad."

Burton's career rushing total at Miami was 1,298 yards on 157 carries for an average of 8.3 yards per carry. His career scoring total at Miami was 151 points.

In track, Burton won Mid-American Conference championships in the low hurdles three consecutive years and also placed in the high jump and 100-yard dash. As a senior, he placed second in the low hurdles at the national AAU meet. Burton was 4th in the 220 yards hurdles at the 1955 NCAA track and field championships.

=== Ottawa Rough Riders ===
After graduating from Miami in 1956, Burton played one year of professional football for the Ottawa Rough Riders in the Canadian Football League. After a November 1956 win over the Hamilton Tiger-Cats, the Ottawa Citizen described Burton as one of Ottawa's stars: "Burton, one of Ottawa's stars, played a leading role in the 95-yard drive which brought the Riders their game-winning field goal. He took a long, 40-yard pass from Ledyard at center field and scurried like a scared rabbit to the Hamilton 27 before being nailed." In his one season of professional football, Burton led the league with eight interceptions. He scored four touchdowns (three rushing, one receiving), and had 155 rushing yards (29 carries for 5.34 yards per carry), 319 receiving yards (14 receptions for 22.79 yards per reception), and 175 kickoff return yards (11 returns for 15.91 yards per return).

=== Coaching career ===
After retiring as a player, Burton returned to Miami where he studied physical education and received a master's degree in education in 1962. Burton taught and coached for several years at Ach Junior High School in Cincinnati. He also coached football for five years at Withrow High School and Hughes High School, both in Cincinnati. Burton credited his college coach for inspiring him to be a coach: "Ara Parseghian was a great coach, ahead of his time as a teacher of all aspects of football. Because of him, I wanted to be a coach."

In June 1968, Burton was hired as an assistant football coach at the historically black Central State College in Wilberforce, Ohio. He was given responsibility for the offensive and defensive backfields.

In January 1969, after Bill Mallory was hired as the head football coach at Miami, Burton was hired as an assistant coach at Miami. Mallory and Burton had been teammates at Miami. Mallory later recalled: "I'd known [Burton] back when we were students. I always had great respect for him. He was a darn good coach. I knew he'd be the kind of person I would want on my staff. I knew he would be a good teacher of the game." Burton became the first African-American coach in any capacity at Miami.

In June 1970, after one season at Miami, Bo Schembechler offered Burton an assistant coaching position at Michigan, and Burton accepted. Despite his strong ties to Miami, Burton recalled that he could not pass on the opportunity to coach at Michigan: "I left Miami to coach at Michigan because of the challenge and an upward move in the profession." Burton remained an assistant coach at Michigan for 22 years from 1970 to 1991. He began in 1970 as the coach of the freshman football team, coached receivers from 1972 to 1980 and then took over as the running backs coach from 1980 to 1992. Burton was the position coach for All-American receivers Jim Smith and Anthony Carter and to running back Jamie Morris. In 1990, Burton said that Morris was favorite Michigan player. Morris gave credit to Burton for his development: "Tirrel was everything to me. He was like my father and mother. He always was in my corner. Bo would get on me, and he would take some of the blame for me. He handled each individual the way he needed to be handled." Burton reported that coaching under Schembechler had been a huge honor: "Bo Schembechler was a great coach. He was from the same mold as Ara [Parseghian] ... Bo was demanding of his coaches and his players. I learned most of what I know about football from Bo."

Burton retired from the Michigan coaching staff in May 1992.

=== Later years and honors ===
After retiring as a coach, Burton remained employed by the University of Michigan as an assistant director of licensing for the athletic department. In 1994, Burton was teamed with Tom Hemingway, who had been announcing University of Michigan football games since 1963, as the radio announcers for Michigan Wolverines football games on WUOM radio.

Burton was inducted into the Miami University Hall of Fame in 1974. He died on January 17, 2017, at the age of 87.
