= Paul Staroba =

American football player (born 1949)

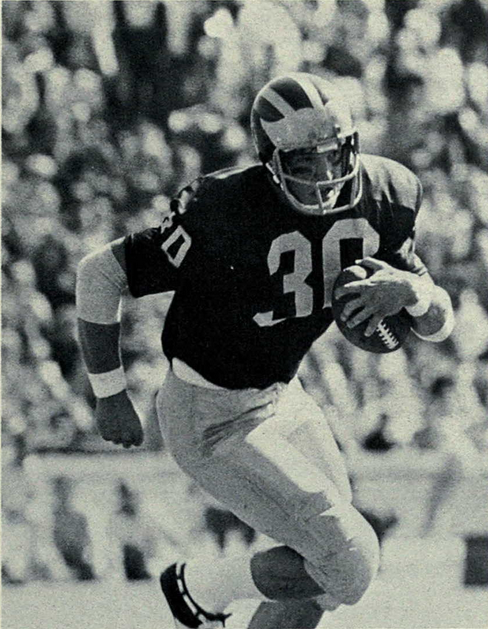
- Staroba from 1971 Michiganensian

No. 85
- Position: Wide receiver/punter

Personal information
- Born: January 20, 1949 (age 77); Flint, Michigan, U.S.
- Listed height: 6 ft 3 in (1.91 m)
- Listed weight: 204 lb (93 kg)

Career information
- High school: St. Matthew
- College: Michigan
- NFL draft: 1971: 3rd round, 66th overall pick

Career history
- Cleveland Browns (1971–1972); Green Bay Packers (1973)

Awards and highlights
- First-team All-Big Ten (1970)

Career NFL statistics
- Receptions: 2
- Yards: 42
- Touchdowns: 1
- Stats at Pro Football Reference

Paul Louis Staroba (born January 20, 1949) is an American former professional football player who was a wide receiver and punter in the National Football League (NFL). He played college football for the Michigan Wolverines from 1968 to 1970. During the 1970 season, he caught 35 passes for 519 yards and led the Big Ten Conference, and finished fourth in the country, with a 41.5 yard punting average. He played in the NFL for the Cleveland Browns in 1972 and the Washington Redskins and Green Bay Packers in 1973.

== Early life ==
Staroba grew up in Flint, Michigan, attended St. Matthew High School in Flint, and played high school football as a running back.

== University of Michigan ==
Staroba enrolled at the University of Michigan and played for the Michigan Wolverines football team from 1968 to 1970. He saw limited playing time as a sophomore and junior, catching 11 passes for 158 yards in 1968 and 12 passes for 141 yards in 1969. As a senior, Staroba became a starter and caught 35 passes for 519 yards. He had the best game of his career on October 31, 1970, in a 29–15 victory over the Wisconsin Badgers. He caught six passes from Don Moorhead for a total of 178 receiving yards, a touchdown and a two-point conversion. Staroba also served as Michigan's punter, punted for 2,240 yards in 1970 (including 401 yards against Arizona), and led the Big Ten, and finished fourth in the country, with a 41.5 yard average in 1970.

== Professional football ==
Staroba was selected by the Cleveland Browns in the third round (66th overall pick) of the 1971 NFL draft. He spent the 1971 NFL season on the "cab squad" and appeared in eight games, one as a starter, for the Browns during the 1972 NFL season. Staroba had a 19-yard reception for the game-winning touchdown against the Denver Broncos.

In June 1973, the Browns traded Staroba to the Washington Redskins in exchange for an undisclosed future draft choice. He caught a 32-yard touchdown pass from Sonny Jurgensen in an exhibition game against the Broncos, but he was released by the Redskins in early September 1973. He was signed by the Green Bay Packers in early December 1973, appeared in two games, and made one catch for a 23-yard gain. Staroba also had 12 punts for an average of 31.1 yards for the Packers.

In July 1974, Staroba was one of players arrested for picketing a scrimmage between Green Bay Packers and Chicago Bears replacement players during the 1974 NFL strike despite a restraining order obtained by the Packers to keep them at a distance from Lambeau Field.

== Post-football life ==
After retiring from football, Staroba worked for an Anheuser-Busch dealership in Flint, Michigan. Staroba and his wife, Wendy, were married in approximately 1974, settled in Grand Blanc, Michigan, and had five daughters.

== See also ==
- Lists of Michigan Wolverines football receiving leaders
