= Doug Dieken =

American football player (born 1949)

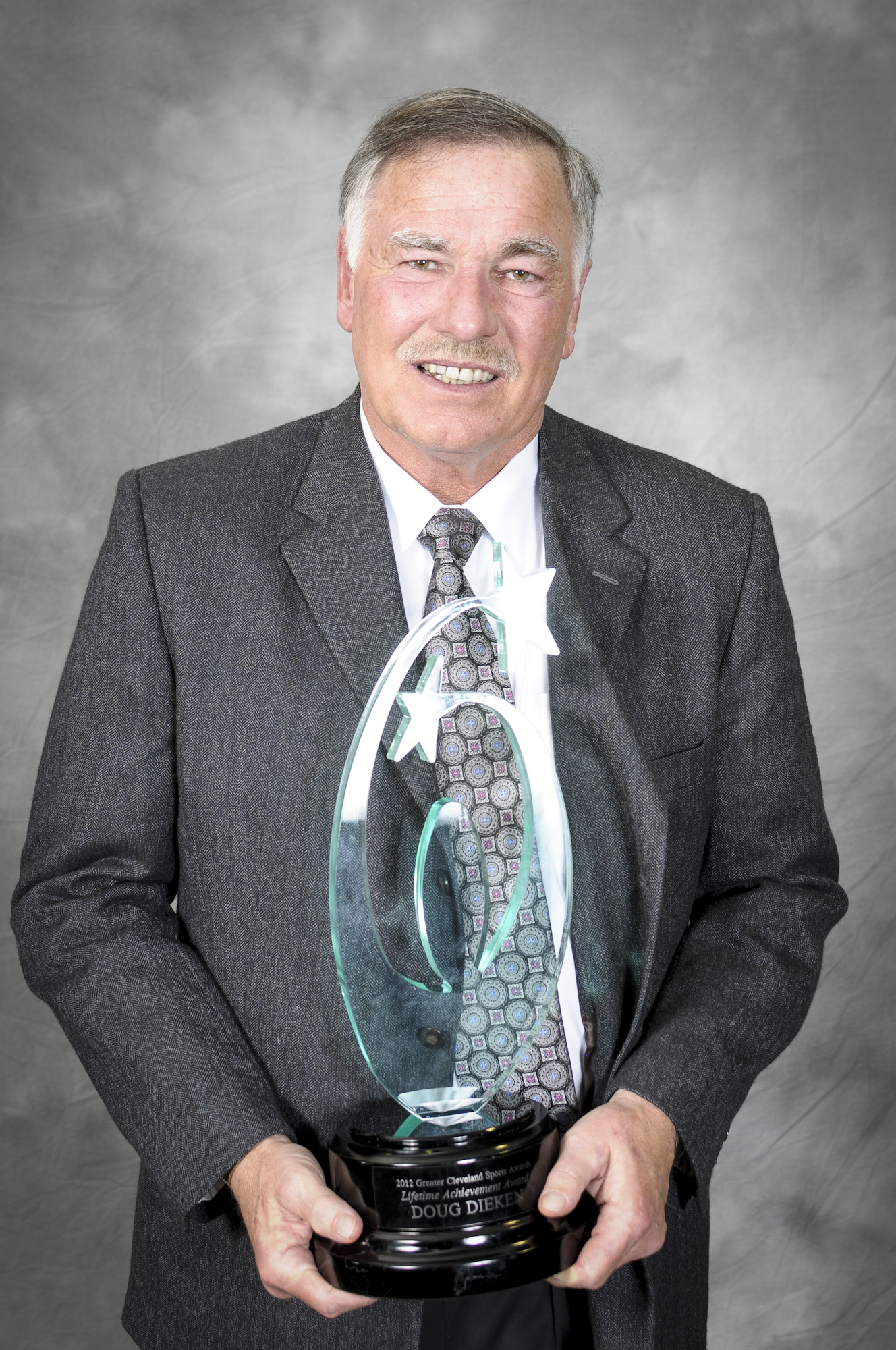
- Dieken in 2013

No. 73
- Position: Offensive tackle

Personal information
- Born: February 12, 1949 (age 77); Streator, Illinois, U.S.
- Listed height: 6 ft 5 in (1.96 m)
- Listed weight: 254 lb (115 kg)

Career information
- High school: Streator Township
- College: Illinois
- NFL draft: 1971: 6th round, 142nd overall pick

Career history
- Cleveland Browns (1971–1984)

Awards and highlights
- Pro Bowl (1980); Cleveland Browns Legends; First-team All-Big Ten (1970)

Career NFL statistics
- Fumble recoveries: 13
- Safeties: 1
- Touchdowns: 1
- Stats at Pro Football Reference

Douglas Heye Dieken (born February 12, 1949) is an American retired professional football player and radio color analyst for the Cleveland Browns of the National Football League (NFL). He played college football for the Illinois Fighting Illini. From 1971-2022, he had 51 years of association with the Browns in various capacities - 14 seasons playing as a left tackle (1971-1984), radio analyst for 34 seasons (between two stints: 1985-1995, 1999-2022), and an ambassador/spokesman during the team's three seasons of inactivity (1996-1998).

== Playing career ==
In high school, Doug was a tight end, defensive end and punter. He caught 80 career passes, was a two-time North Central Illinois Conference First-team selection and was named to the All-State Team in 1966 by the Champaign News-Gazette. In college, he was a tight end on an Illinois team that hardly passed at all, and so he was not taken until the sixth round of the 1971 draft with the 142nd overall pick. His first game in a Browns uniform was an exhibition game against the Chicago Bears that happened to be the game used as a backdrop for the movie Brian's Song which was released in November 1971. After improving rapidly during his first year with the Browns, the coaches seemed to think he could take over for left tackle Dick Schafrath. He did, and became only the third left tackle in the team's history.

Dieken set team records with 194 consecutive starts and 203 consecutive games played. A Pro Bowl selection, he received the NFL Man of the Year Award following the 1982 season for his involvement with charitable organizations in the Cleveland area.

== Broadcasting career ==
Following his retirement after the 1984 season, Dieken became a color commentator on Browns radio broadcasts, a job he held through the 2021 season, when he announced his retirement.

Combining his playing and broadcasting career, he had been a part of the Browns organization for 51 years – as a player from 1971 to 1984, a radio broadcaster from 1985 to 1995 and 1999 to 2022, and a spokesman/ambassador for the Cleveland Browns Trust during the team's "inactive" period from 1996 to 1998.

== Awards and honors ==
NFL

- 1980 Pro Bowl selection
- 1982 Byron "Whizzer" White NFL Man of the Year Award
- Radio booth at Cleveland Browns Stadium renamed the "Doug Dieken Radio Booth"

Halls of Fame

- 1992 Greater Cleveland Sports Hall of Fame inductee
- 2003 Ohio Broadcasters Hall of Fame inductee
- Cleveland Browns Legends Club inductee (class of 2006)

State/local

- Inaugural winner of the Cleveland Touchdown Club Humanitarian Award (soon after renamed for Dieken)
- 2012 Greater Cleveland Sports Commission Lifetime Achievement Award
- Football field at Streator High School was renamed Doug Dieken Stadium on September 2, 2022
