= 1970 All-Big Ten Conference football team =

American college football all-star team

The 1970 All-Big Ten Conference football team consists of American football players chosen by various organizations for All-Big Ten Conference teams for the 1970 Big Ten Conference football season. The teams selected by the Big Ten coaches for the United Press International (UPI) were dominated by the 1970 Michigan Wolverines football team with 10 first-team selections and the 1970 Ohio State Buckeyes football team with six first-team selections.

== Offensive selections ==
=== Quarterbacks ===
- Don Moorhead, Michigan (AP-1; UPI-1)
- Rex Kern, Ohio State (AP-2; UPI-2)

=== Halfbacks ===
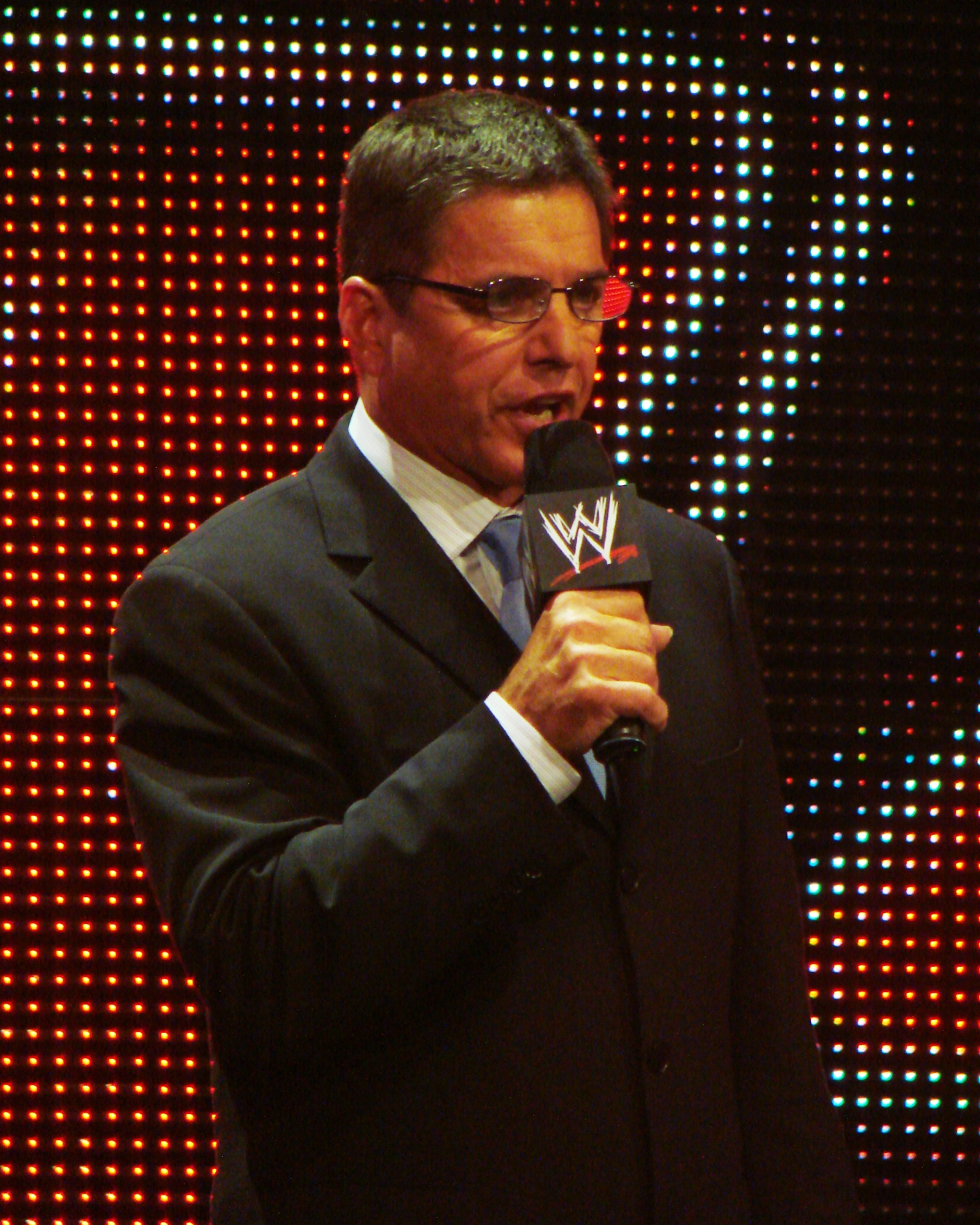
Mike Adamle in 2008

- Mike Adamle, Northwestern (AP-1; UPI-1)
- Billy Taylor, Michigan (AP-2; UPI-2)
- Levi Mitchell, Iowa (AP-2)
- Eric Allen, Michigan State (UPI-2)
- Leo Hayden, Ohio State (UPI-2)

=== Fullbacks ===
- John Brockington, Ohio State (AP-1; UPI-1)
- Barry Mayer, Minnesota (UPI-2)

=== Tight ends ===
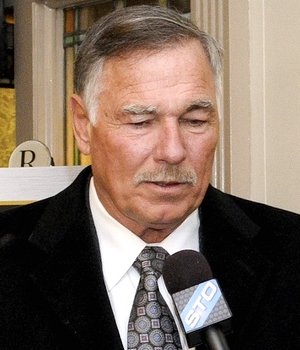
Doug Dieken in 2012

- Doug Dieken, Illinois (AP-2 [end]; UPI-1)
- Jan White, Ohio State (UPI-2)

=== Split ends ===
- Paul Staroba, Michigan (AP-1 [end]; UPI-1)
- Larry Mialik, Wisconsin (AP-1 [end])
- Gordon Bowdell, Michigan State (AP-2 [end]; UPI-2)

=== Flankers ===
- Barry Pearson, Northwestern (AP-1)
- Stan Brown, Purdue (AP-2)

=== Tackles ===
- Dan Dierdorf, Michigan (AP-1; UPI-1)
- John Rodman, Northwestern (AP-1; UPI-2)
- Dave Cheney, Ohio State (UPI-1)
- Jack Harpring, Michigan (AP-2)
- John Muller, Iowa (AP-2)
- Donnie Green, Purdue (UPI-2)

=== Guards ===
- Mike Sikich, Northwestern (AP-1; UPI-1)
- Reggie McKenzie, Michigan (AP-2; UPI-1)
- Phil Strickland, Ohio State (AP-1; UPI-2)
- Joe DeLamielleure, Michigan State (AP-2)
- Alvin Hawes, Minnesota (UPI-2)

=== Centers ===
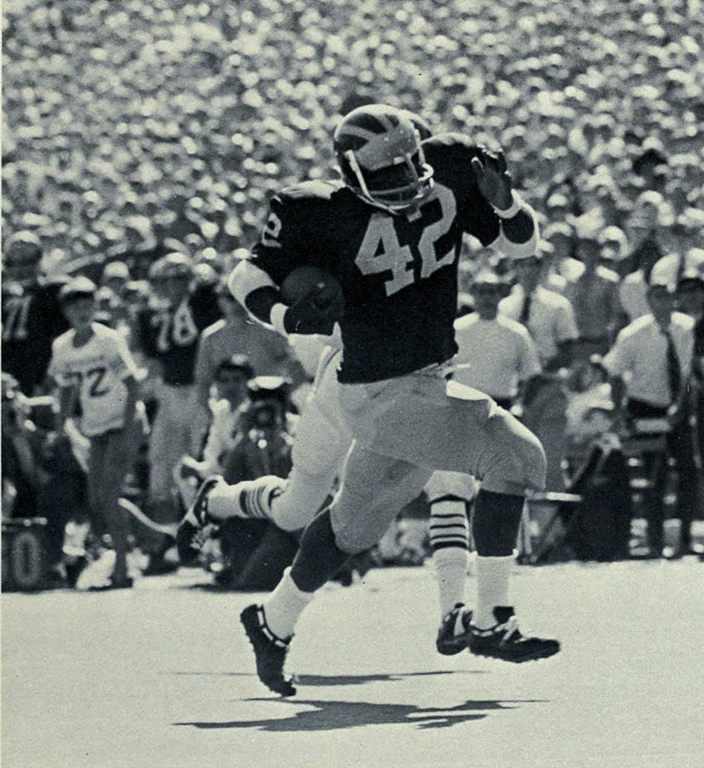
Michigan running back Billy Taylor

- Tom DeLeone, Ohio State (AP-1)
- Guy Murdock, Michigan (UPI-1 [tie])
- Joe Zigulich, Northwestern (UPI-1 [tie])
- Tom Beard, Michigan State (AP-2)

== Defensive selections ==
=== Ends ===
- Phil Seymour, Michigan (AP-1; UPI-1)
- Bill Gregory, Wisconsin (AP-1; UPI-1 [def. tackle])
- Mark Debevc, Ohio State (AP-2; UPI-1)
- Ed Maguire, Indiana (AP-2)
- Mike Keller, Michigan (UPI-2)
- Layne McDowell, Iowa (UPI-2)

=== Tackles ===
- Pete Newell, Michigan (AP-1; UPI-1)
- Jim DeLisle, Wisconsin (AP-2; UPI-2)
- Jim Anderson, Northwestern (AP-2)
- George Hasenohrl, Ohio State (UPI-2)

=== Middle guards ===
- Henry Hill, Michigan (AP-1 [def. tackle]; UPI-1 [tie])
- Jim Stillwagon, Ohio State (AP-1 [linebacker]; UPI-1 [tie])

=== Linebackers ===
- Chuck Winfrey, Wisconsin (AP-1; UPI-1)
- Bill Light, Minnesota (AP-1; UPI-2)
- Marty Huff, Michigan (AP-2; UPI-1)
- Doug Adams, Ohio State (AP-2; UPI-2)
- Jim Teal, Purdue (AP-2)

=== Defensive backs ===
- Eric Hutchinson, Northwestern (AP-1; UPI-1)
- Mike Sensibaugh, Ohio State (AP-1 [safety]; UPI-1)
- Jack Tatum, Ohio State (AP-1; UPI-1)
- Jeff Wright, Minnesota (AP-1; UPI-2)
- Thom Darden, Michigan (UPI-1)
- Randy Cooper, Purdue (AP-2; UPI-2)
- Tim Anderson, Ohio State (AP-2)
- Walt Bowser, Minnesota (AP-2 [safety])
- Rick Telander, Northwestern (AP-2)
- Jim Betts, Michigan (UPI-2)
- Craig Clemons, Iowa (UPI-2)

== Key ==
AP = Associated Press

UPI = United Press International, selected by the Big Ten Conference coaches

Bold = Consensus first-team selection by both AP and UPI

== See also ==
- 1970 College Football All-America Team
