= Larry Mialik =

American football player (born 1950)

Larry Mialik is an American athlete, who played tight end in the National Football League (NFL) from 1972 through 1976. He also sailed as a member of the crew aboard America³, winner of the America's Cup in 1992.

== Biography ==
Mialik was born Lawrence George Mialik on May 15, 1950, in Passaic, New Jersey.

He began playing football in the tenth grade at Clifton High School in Clifton, New Jersey.

== Athletic career ==
Mialik played at the collegiate level at the University of Wisconsin-Madison where he was a 1st team All Big Ten selection as a tight end as well as an Associated Press honorable mention All-American.

Mialik was drafted in the twelfth round of the 1972 NFL draft by the Atlanta Falcons and would be with the team for four credited seasons. He played with the San Diego Chargers during the 1976 NFL season. He is a vested NFL alumni.

Mialik initially took up sailing as a hobby but became interested in the competitive aspect of the sport when he met members of the crew of The Heart of America, a contender for the America's Cup in 1987. He would go on to participate in four America's Cup campaigns, including serving as a member of the winning crew with America³ in 1992. In the victorious 1992 effort, Mialik worked as a "grinder," operating the heavy winches which control the jib and spinnaker, the two forward sails.
