= Billy Taylor (running back, born 1949) =

American gridiron football player

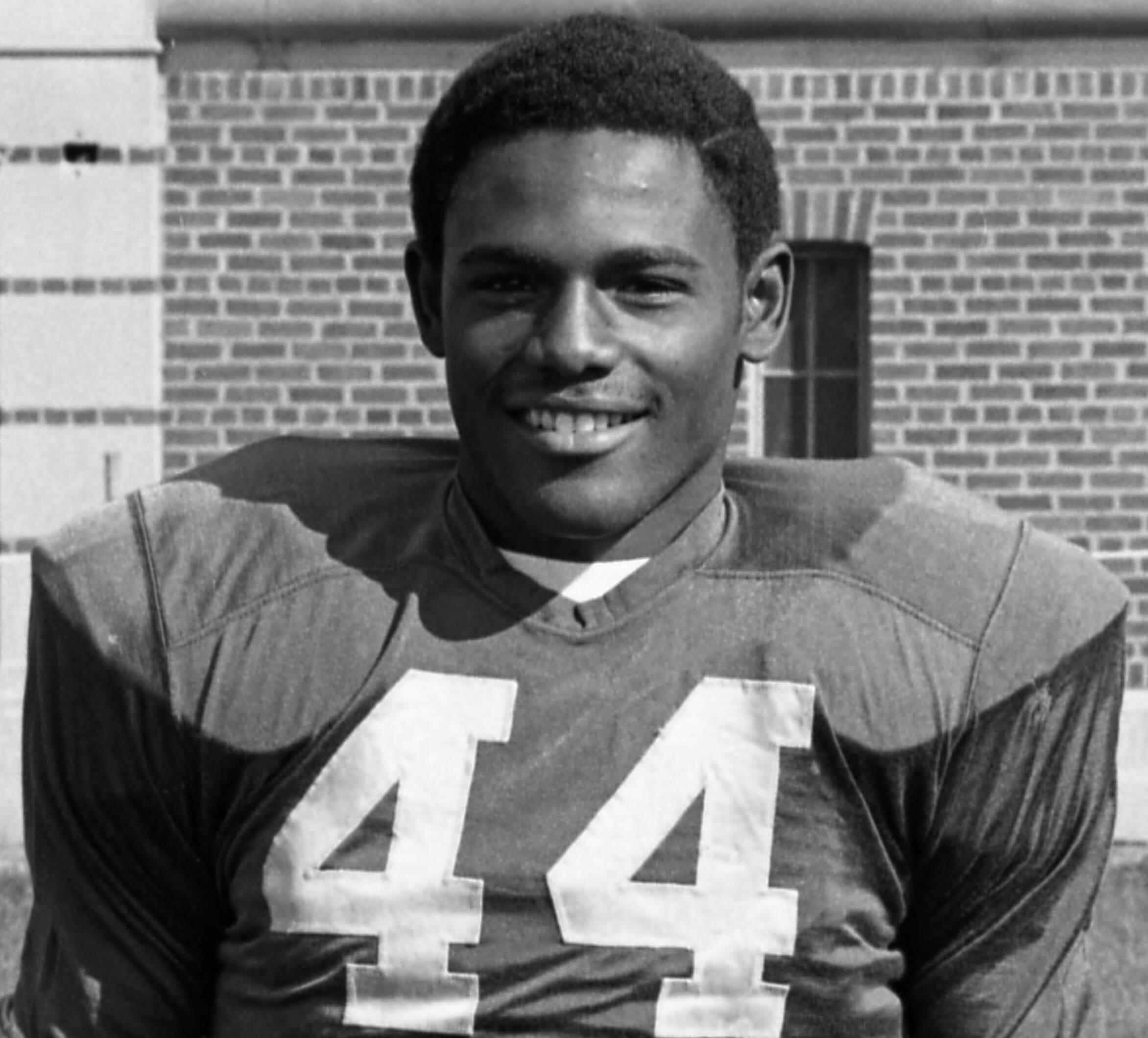
- Taylor in 1969

No. 20, 42
- Position: Running back

Personal information
- Born: January 7, 1949 (age 77); Hoxie, Arkansas, U.S.
- Listed height: 5 ft 10 in (1.78 m)
- Listed weight: 230 lb (104 kg)

Career information
- High school: Barberton (Barberton, Ohio)
- College: Michigan
- NFL draft: 1972: 5th round, 109th overall pick

Career history
- Atlanta Falcons (1971)*; St. Louis Cardinals (1971)*; Calgary Stampeders (1972); Chicago Fire (1974); Memphis Southmen (1974)
- * Offseason or practice squad member only

Awards and highlights
- Second-team All-American (1971); 2× First-team All-Big Ten (1969, 1971); Second-team All-Big Ten (1970)

William Lewis Taylor (born January 7, 1949) is a former professional American and Canadian football running back who played for Calgary Stampeders of the Canadian Football League (CFL) after starring for the University of Michigan Wolverines. At Michigan, he became an All-American and broke the school record for career rushing yardage and finished second to Tom Harmon in scoring.

== University of Michigan ==
Born in Hoxie, Arkansas, Taylor spent his early years in Memphis, Tennessee until his father's death in 1954 when Taylor was five years old. His mother moved the family to Barberton, Ohio. After graduating from high school, Taylor attended the University of Michigan where he became one of the most accomplished football players in school history. He was an All-Big Ten selection three times and a first team All-Big Ten selection two times (1969 and 1970).

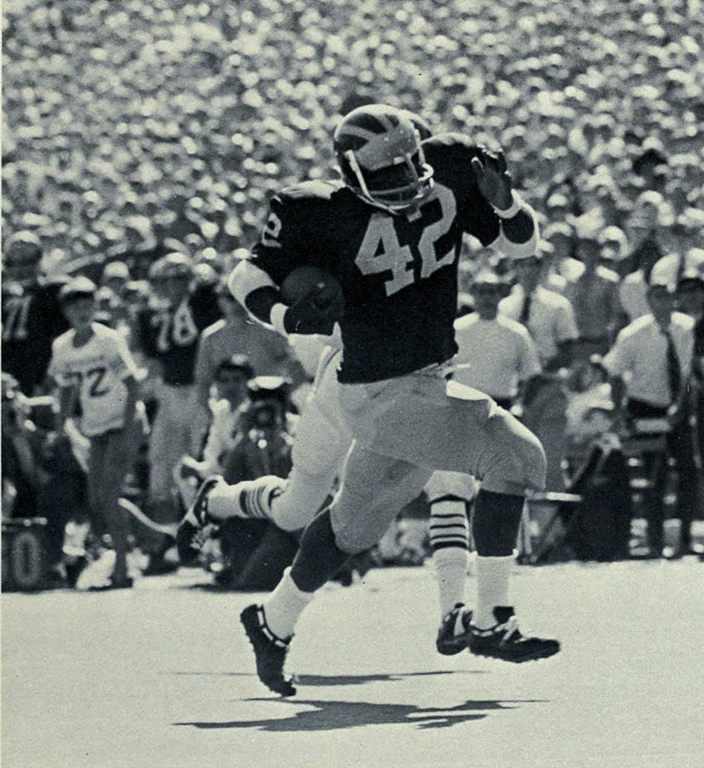
Taylor playing for Michigan in 1970

Taylor broke the Michigan career rushing record with 3,072 yards in three seasons. His record was broken six years later by Rob Lytle.

His 587 carries was also a school record at the time he graduated. He finished his U-M career second to Tom Harmon with 32 career touchdowns and 194 points. He also set the school record in average rushing yards per game at 102 yards per game. He rushed for 1,297 yards in his senior season (1971) and was selected as the team MVP. In the last two minutes of the 1971 Michigan-Ohio State game, Michigan was trailing, 7-3, when Bo Schembechler called Taylor's number. Taylor ran around the end and into the end zone, and Michigan won to cap an undefeated regular season. "It was every kid's dream," says Taylor, remembering what it was like to score the winning touchdown. During Taylor's years they had excellent offensive linemen such as Dan Dierdorf, Reggie McKenzie, and Jim Mandich. Taylor was also named the Most Valuable Player of the 1971 Michigan football team that went undefeated in the regular season (but lost 13-12 to Stanford in the 1972 Rose Bowl game). The team was ranked in the top 5 all season and had four All-Americans.

Although Taylor played in 33 games at Michigan he only carried the ball in 30 of them. His 3072 yards in 30 games gives him a 102.3 yards/game average which was a Michigan average until Mike Hart established a new standard in his career ending in 2007.

In 1969, Taylor rushed for 225 yards against the University of Iowa. At that time, Ron Johnson was the only Michigan player who had rushed for more yards in a game.

== Downward spiral and substance abuse ==
On January 4, 1972, just a few days after Taylor's final game as a Wolverine, his mother died. "After my mother died I didn't want to play anymore" says Taylor. He played in a post-season game at Coach Schembechler's encouragement. O. J. Simpson, who was broadcasting the game, told Taylor to call home. When Taylor called home he discovered that his uncle had killed his aunt and then himself. Late that same summer, his girlfriend, Valerie, was stabbed to death outside a roller rink in Detroit. Taylor wrote in his autobiography that football injuries and deaths of close family members sent him on "a long downward spiral of depression, drinking, drugs and encounters with the law."

Taylor was selected by the Atlanta Falcons in the fifth round of the 1972 NFL draft, but he had a poor training camp with the Falcons. He was traded to the St. Louis Cardinals, put on injured reserve, and finally cut. Taylor played the 1972 season with the Calgary Stampeders in the Canadian Football League, getting into two games and totaling 62 yards rushing on seven carries, three receptions for 27 yards and three kickoff returns for 59 yards. After brief trials in 1974 with Chicago and Memphis of the World Football League (getting into one game, rushing once for two yards), Taylor's football career was over.

Taylor went into a downward spiral ("I self-medicated" he later said) that lasted 25 years. He managed to get his master's degree in education, get married and have three children, but the ex-football star suffered from depression, divorced his wife, became isolated from his children, and eventually became homeless. Taylor hit a low when he was convicted for having knowledge of a bank robbery and spent 2½ years in a federal penitentiary; after his release, he became an addict living on the streets of Detroit, cut off from friends and family.

== Rehabilitation ==
In August 1997, Taylor reports he had an experience with God. "It was August 17, 1997. It was 5 a.m. I was sitting in front of an abandoned apartment building at the corner of Lakewood and Jefferson. I was drinking vodka and Black Label beer. I heard a voice. The voice said, 'William Taylor, come forth.' I heard it as clear as we're talking now. It scared me to death. I jumped straight up in the air. I started cursing and looking for the person who had scared the daylights out of me. ... It was God. I don't want to offend anyone, but that's my testimony."

He stopped drinking and taking drugs that day and published a book about his experience called "Get Back Up: The Billy Taylor Story." In 2003, Taylor received an Ed.D. degree from the University of Nevada, Las Vegas. He has held several positions at the Community College of Southern Nevada. Most recently, Taylor was the Director of Rehabilitation Services for the Salvation Army Southeast Michigan working in Detroit and Pontiac, Michigan.

== See also ==
- Lists of Michigan Wolverines football rushing leaders
