= 1970 Big Ten Conference football season =

- Sport: American football
- Teams: 10
- Top draft pick: John Brockington
- Champion: Ohio State
- Runners-up: Michigan, Northwestern
- Season MVP: Mike Adamle

Seasons
- 1969 1971

1970 Big Ten Conference football standings
	Conf.					Overall
Team	W		L		T	W		L		T
No. 5 Ohio State $	7	–	0	–	0	9	–	1	–	0
No. 9 Michigan	6	–	1	–	0	9	–	1	–	0
Northwestern	6	–	1	–	0	6	–	4	–	0
Iowa	3	–	3	–	1	3	–	6	–	1
Wisconsin	3	–	4	–	0	4	–	5	–	1
Michigan State	3	–	4	–	0	4	–	6	–	0
Minnesota	2	–	4	–	1	3	–	6	–	1
Purdue	2	–	5	–	0	4	–	6	–	0
Illinois	1	–	6	–	0	3	–	7	–	0
Indiana	1	–	6	–	0	1	–	9	–	0
$ – Conference champion; Rankings from AP Poll

The 1970 Big Ten Conference football season was the 75th season of college football played by the member schools of the Big Ten Conference and was a part of the 1970 NCAA University Division football season.

The 1970 Ohio State Buckeyes football team, under head coach Woody Hayes, won the Big Ten football championship, was ranked No. 5 in the final AP Poll, and led the conference in scoring offense (29.0 points per game). The Buckeyes were undefeated in the regular season but lost to Stanford in the 1971 Rose Bowl. Defensive back Jack Tatum and middle guard Jim Stillwagon were consensus first-team All-Americans. Stillwagon also won the Outland Trophy as the best interior lineman in college football. Running back John Brockington led the conference with 102 points scored, received first-team All-American honors from multiple selectors, and was the first Big Ten player selected in the 1971 NFL draft with the ninth overall pick. Quarterback Rex Kern finished fifth in the voting for the 1970 Heisman Trophy.

The 1970 Michigan Wolverines football team, under head coach Bo Schembechler, was ranked No. 9 in the final AP Poll and led the conference in scoring defense (9.0 points per game). Michigan's only loss was to Ohio State. Offensive tackle Dan Dierdorf was a consensus first-team All-American. Quarterback Don Moorhead and middle guard Henry Hill were selected as the team's most valuable players.

Michigan knew its season would be ten games, regardless of record, long before the season opener. The Wolverines represented the conference in the previous year's Rose Bowl, and Big Ten rules at the time (a) prohibited a team from making consecutive appearances in the Rose Bowl, and (b) prohibited teams from accepting a berth to a bowl game other than the one in Pasadena. The no-repeat rule was repealed for the 1972 season, but the ban on other bowls was not lifted until 1975; the latter rule kept the Wolverines out of the postseason in 1972, '73 and '74 despite compiling a 30-2-1 record over those seasons.

The 1970 Northwestern Wildcats football team, under head coach Alex Agase, tied with Michigan for second place in the Big Ten and was ranked Running back Mike Adamle of Northwestern led the conference with 1,255 rushing yards and received the Chicago Tribune Silver Football as the conference's most valuable player.

== Season overview ==
=== Results and team statistics ===
Conf. Rank	Team	Head coach	AP final	AP high	Overall record	Conf. record	PPG	PAG	MVP
1	Ohio State	Woody Hayes	#5	#1	9–1	7–0	**29.0**	12.0	Jim Stillwagon
2 (tie)	Michigan	Bo Schembechler	#9	#4	9–1	6–1	28.8	**9.0**	Don Moorhead; Henry Hill
2 (tie)	Northwestern	Alex Agase	NR	#18	6-4	6-1	23.3	16.1	**Mike Adamle**
4	Iowa	Ray Nagel	NR	NR	3–6–1	3–3–1	12.9	25.9	Dave Clement
5 (tie)	Wisconsin	John Jardine	NR	NR	4–5–1	3–4	19.8	19.5	Chuck Winfrey
5 (tie)	Michigan State	Duffy Daugherty	NR	NR	4–6	3–4	19.0	21.5	Eric Allen
7	Minnesota	Murray Warmath	NR	NR	3–6–1	2–4–1	18.0	23.7	Jeff Wright
8	Purdue	Bob DeMoss	NR	NR	4–6	2–5	16.1	18.9	Stan Brown
9 (tie)	Illinois	Jim Valek	NR	NR	3–7	1–6	16.5	27.9	Doug Dieken
9 (tie)	Indiana	John Pont	NR	NR	1–9	1–6	10.2	30.0	Chris Morris

Key
AP final = Team's rank in the final AP Poll of the 1970 season
AP high = Team's highest rank in the AP Poll throughout the 1970 season
PPG = Average of points scored per game; conference leader's average displayed in bold
PAG = Average of points allowed per game; conference leader's average displayed in bold
MVP = Most valuable player as voted by players on each team as part of the voting process to determine the winner of the Chicago Tribune Silver Football trophy; trophy winner in bold

=== Bowl games ===
Date	Time	Visiting team	Home team	Site	TV	Result	Attendance	Ref.
January 1, 1971		No. 12 Stanford	No. 2 Ohio State	Rose Bowl • Pasadena, CA (Rose Bowl)		**L** 17–27	103,839	
^{#}Rankings from AP Poll. All times are in Eastern Standard Time.

== Statistical leaders ==
=== Passing yards ===
1. Mike Rasmussen, Michigan State (1,344)
2. Craig Curry, Minnesota (1,315)
3. Neil Graff, Wisconsin (1,313)
4. Maurie Daigneau, Northwestern (1,228)
5. Don Moorhead, Michigan (1,167)

=== Rushing yards ===
1. Mike Adamle, Northwestern (1,255)
2. John Brockington, Ohio State (1,142)
3. Otis Armstrong, Purdue (1,009)
4. Billy Taylor, Michigan (911)
5. Levi Mitchell, Iowa (900)

=== Receiving yards ===
1. Larry Mialik, Wisconsin (702)
2. Barry Pearson, Northwestern (552)
3. Doug Dieken, Illinois (537)
4. Paul Staroba, Michigan (519)
5. Gordon Bowdell, Michigan State (495)

=== Total yards ===
1. Craig Curry, Minnesota (1,610)
2. Neil Graff, Wisconsin (1,561)
3. Don Moorhead, Michigan (1,535)
4. Mike Rasmussen, Michigan State (1,358)
5. Mike Adamle, Northwestern (1,255)

=== Scoring ===
1. John Brockington, Ohio State (102)
2. Billy Taylor, Michigan (66)
3. Eric Allen, Michigan State (60)
3. Mike Adamle, Northwestern (60)
5. Fritz Seyferth, Michigan (48)

== Awards and honors ==
=== All-Big Ten honors ===
The following players were picked by the Associated Press (AP) and/or the United Press International (UPI) as first-team players on the 1970 All-Big Ten Conference football team.

Offense

Position	Name	Team	Selectors
Quarterback	Don Moorhead	Michigan	AP, UPI
Halfback	Mike Adamle	Northwestern	AP, UPI
Fullback	John Brockington	Ohio State	AP, UPI
Tight end	Doug Dieken	Illinois	UPI
Offensive end	Paul Staroba	Michigan	AP, UPI [split end]
Offensive end	Larry Mialik	Wisconsin	AP
Flanker	Barry Pearson	Northwestern	AP
Offensive tackle	Dan Dierdorf	Michigan	AP, UPI
Offensive tackle	John Rodman	Northwestern	AP
Offensive tackle	Dave Cheney	Ohio State	UPI
Offensive guard	Mike Sikich	Northwestern	AP, UPI
Offensive guard	Reggie McKenzie	Michigan	UPI
Offensive guard	Phil Strickland	Ohio State	AP
Center	Tom DeLeone	Ohio State	AP
Center	Guy Murdock	Michigan	UPI [tie]
Center	Joe Zigulich	Northwestern	UPI [tie]

Defense

Position	Name	Team	Selectors
Defensive end	Phil Seymour	Michigan	AP, UPI
Defensive end	Bill Gregory	Wisconsin	AP, UPI [def. tackle]
Defensive end	Mark Debevc	Ohio State	UPI
Defensive tackle	Pete Newell	Michigan	AP, UPI
Middle guard	Henry Hill	Michigan	AP [def. tackle], UPI [tie]
Middle guard	Jim Stillwagon	Ohio State	AP [linebacker], UPI [tie]
Linebacker	Chuck Winfrey	Wisconsin	AP, UPI
Linebacker	Bill Light	Minnesota	AP
Linebacker	Marty Huff	Michigan	UPI
Defensive back	Eric Hutchinson	Northwestern	AP, UPI
Defensive back	Mike Sensibaugh	Ohio State	AP [safety], UPI
Defensive back	Jack Tatum	Ohio State	AP, UPI
Defensive back	Jeff Wright	Minnesota	AP
Defensive back	Thom Darden	Michigan	UPI

=== All-American honors ===
At the end of the 1970 season, Big Ten players secured three of the consensus first-team picks for the 1970 College Football All-America Team. The Big Ten's consensus All-American was:

Position	Name	Team	Selectors
Defensive back	Jack Tatum	Ohio State	AFCA, AP, CP, FWAA, NEA, UPI, FN, PFW, Time, TSN, WCFF
Offensive tackle	Dan Dierdorf	Michigan	AFCA, AP, FWAA, NEA, UPI, FN, PFW, Time, WCFF
Middle guard	Jim Stillwagon	Ohio State	AFCA, AP, CP, FWAA, NEA, UPI, FN, WCFF

Other Big Ten players who were named first-team All-Americans by at least one selector were:

Position	Name	Team	Selectors
Running back	John Brockington	Ohio State	CP [fullback], UPI, FN, PFW, Time, TSN
Running back	Mike Adamle	Northwestern	FN
Running back	Leo Hayden	Ohio State	PFW
Tight end	Jan White	Ohio State	NEA, Time, TSN
Middle guard	Henry Hill	Michigan	CP
Linebacker	Marty Huff	Michigan	AFCA
Defensive back	Mike Sensibaugh	Ohio State	CP [safety], UPI
Defensive back	Tim Anderson	Ohio State	Time, TSN

=== Other awards ===
Jim Stillwagon of Ohio State received the Outland Trophy as the best interior lineman in college football.

Two Big Ten players finished in the top 10 in the voting for the 1970 Heisman Trophy. They were: Ohio State quarterback Rex Kern (fifth); and Ohio State defensive back Jack Tatum (seventh).

== 1971 NFL draft ==
The following Big Ten players were among the first 100 picks in the 1971 NFL draft:

Name	Position	Team	Round	Overall pick
John Brockington	Running back	Ohio State	1	9
Jack Tatum	Safety	Ohio State	1	19
William Tim Anderson	Cornerback	Ohio State	1	23
Leo Hayden	Running back	Ohio State	1	24
Jan White	Tight end	Ohio State	2	29
Dan Dierdorf	Tackle	Michigan	2	43
Paul Staroba	Wide receiver	Michigan	3	66
Bill Gregory	Defensive tackle	Wisconsin	3	77
