= 1969 Rose Bowl =

American college football game

- 55th Rose Bowl Game; National Championship Game (Note: Through luck and fortuitous scheduling, a "national championship game" was occasionally able to settle the matter on the field, as described in some contemporaneous reports.)
Ohio State Buckeyes	USC Trojans
(9–0)	(9–0–1)
Big Ten	Pac-8
27	16
Head coach: Woody Hayes	Head coach: John McKay
AP / Coaches; 1 / 1	AP / Coaches; 2 / 2
	1	2	3	4	Total
Ohio State	0	10	3	14	27
USC	0	10	0	6	16
- Date: January 1, 1969
- Season: 1968
- Stadium: Rose Bowl
- Location: Pasadena, California
- MVP: Rex Kern (Ohio State QB)
- Favorite: Ohio State by 3.5 points
- National anthem: The Ohio State University Marching Band
- Referee: Charles Moffett (Pacific-8) (split crew: Pac-8, Big Ten)
- Halftime show: Spirit of Troy, The Ohio State University Marching Band
- Attendance: 102,063

United States TV coverage
- Network: NBC
- Announcers: Curt Gowdy, Kyle Rote
- Nielsen ratings: 33.5

The 1969 Rose Bowl was the 55th edition of the college football bowl game, played at the Rose Bowl in Pasadena, California, on Wednesday, January 1. The game was a de facto national championship game, as both teams were competing for the Associated Press (AP) title. The top-ranked Ohio State Buckeyes of the Big Ten Conference defeated the defending national champions - #2 USC Trojans of the Pacific-8 Conference, 27-16, to claim their sixth national championship and first consensus national championship since 1942. Sophomore quarterback Rex Kern of Ohio State was the Player of the Game.

Heisman Trophy winner O. J. Simpson rushed for 171 yards and an 80-yard touchdown run, but USC had five turnovers, including an interception and a fumble by Simpson. It was only the second #1 vs. #2 matchup in the Rose Bowl, the first was six years earlier. It was the first time in the history of the Big 9(Ten) – PCC/Big Ten – AAWU agreements that two unbeaten teams met in the Rose Bowl.

It was the first of four Rose Bowl matchups between the head coaches; Woody Hayes of Ohio State and USC's John McKay. It was the first of three with the national championship on the line for both schools.

== Teams ==
This was only the second time in the Rose Bowl where the #1 and #2 teams in the AP poll played and only the third time in a bowl game: the 1963 Rose Bowl was the first and the 1964 Cotton Bowl Classic was the second. It was the 12th time overall that the #1 and #2 team faced each other since the inception of the AP poll in 1936. The Bowl Coalition, Bowl Alliance, BCS, and College Football Playoff were created later to make at least one matchup of the top two teams in the nation.

=== Ohio State Buckeyes ===
The Buckeyes featured a group called "The Super Sophomores" playing in their first varsity season: John Brockington, Leo Hayden, Rex Kern, Jim Otis, Jim Stillwagon, and Jack Tatum. The Buckeyes throttled #4 Michigan 50–14 to complete the regular season, and were favored in the Rose Bowl by 3½ points.

=== USC Trojans ===
The defending national champion Trojans finished undefeated with one tie, which occurred at the end of the regular season against ninth-ranked Notre Dame. They had been ranked first since October 14, but dropped to second after Ohio State routed #4 Michigan; USC stayed in that runner-up position even after the 21–21 tie on November 30. They were captained by Heisman Trophy winner O. J. Simpson; it was the third of four consecutive Rose Bowl appearances for USC.

== Game summary ==
This Rose Bowl was also the beginning of a celebration of a century of college football. Later during the 1969 season, many teams wore uniform patches or helmet stickers with "100" to signify the centennial.

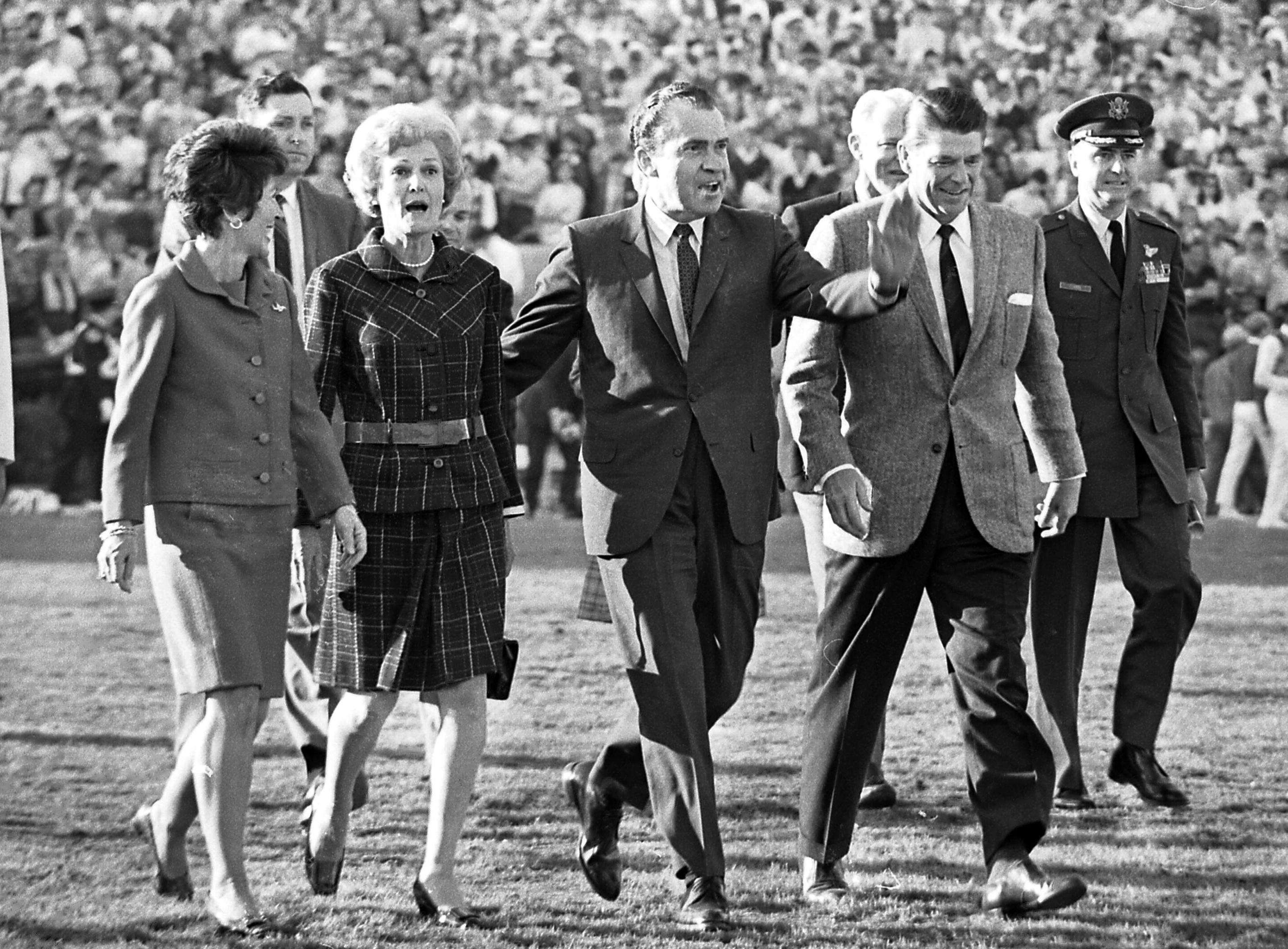
The Nixons and Reagans at the Rose Bowl

A number of celebrities were present, including President-elect Richard Nixon, Bob Hope, California Governor and future United States President Ronald Reagan and his wife Nancy Reagan, and former Oklahoma head coach and then-ABC analyst Bud Wilkinson. First Lady Pat Nixon was a graduate of USC, but President Nixon spent time on both sidelines. Richard Nixon called the Rose Bowl Game, "the prize game of all bowl games."

After O. J. Simpson scored on an 80-yard run to give USC a 10–0 lead, a Trojans fumble at their 21-yard line set up a Rex Kern pass to Leo Hayden for the final four yards. A fumbled reception cost Southern Cal the ball again at its own 16. USC had five turnovers, including two by Simpson. Simpson, besides having a fumble and interception, also underestimated the speed of Jack Tatum, the Ohio State cornerback. This happened on a swing pass that should have been a touchdown, and then on the same series when Simpson overthrew a touchdown pass to Ted DeKraai. Ohio State had one fumble, but managed to keep possession.

== Scoring ==
=== First quarter ===
- No scoring

=== Second quarter ===
- USC - Ron Ayala 21 field goal, 9:40
- USC - O. J. Simpson 80 run (Ayala kick), 6:38
- OSU - Jim Otis 1 run (Jim Roman kick), 1:45
- OSU - Roman 26 field goal, 0:03

=== Third quarter ===
- OSU - Roman 25 field goal, 1:40

=== Fourth quarter ===
- OSU - Leo Hayden 4 pass from Rex Kern (Roman kick), 13:52
- OSU - Ray Gillian 16 pass from Kern (Roman kick),10:05
- USC - Sam Dickerson 19 pass from Steve Sogge (Sogge pass failed), 0:45

== Aftermath ==
The following season, Ohio State was stunned in defense of their national title against Michigan, led by first-year head coach Bo Schembechler, in one of the most notable games in the rivalry. When the Super Sophomores were seniors in 1970, OSU went undefeated in the regular season and returned to Pasadena in January 1971, but was upset by Stanford, led by Heisman Trophy winner Jim Plunkett, the first pick of the 1971 NFL draft.

After losing this Rose Bowl, the Pac-8/10 dominated the series for the next two decades, winning the next four Rose Bowls, ten of the next eleven, and sixteen of the next eighteen.

The next Rose Bowl that matched the #1 and #2 teams was thirty-three years later in January 2002, with Miami (Big East) and Nebraska (Big 12), in the BCS National Championship Game.

== Bibliography ==
- University of Southern California football media guide. (PDF copy available at www.usctrojans.com)
- Ohio State University football media guide. (PDF copy available at www.ohiostatebuckeyes.com)
- College Football's Twenty-Five Greatest Teams: The Sporting News. ISBN 0-89204-281-8
- Park, Jack (2003). The Official Ohio State Football Encyclopedia: National Championship Edition. Sports Publishing LLC. ISBN 1-58261-695-7.
