= Ohio State Football All-Century Team =

Fantasy American football team

The Ohio State Football All-Century Team was chosen in early 2000 by the Touchdown Club of Columbus. It was selected to honor the greatest Ohio State Buckeyes football players of the 20th century. No effort was made to distinguish a first team or second team, the organization instead choosing only to select an 80-man roster and a five-man coaching staff.

Members selected to the team were honored at a banquet on February 19, 2000. Living members of the team elected all-century captains and an all-century Most Valuable Player. As captains they chose Archie Griffin and Rex Kern on offense, and Chris Spielman and Jack Tatum on defense. Archie Griffin was selected as MVP.

== The selected team ==
Position	Name	Years lettering	CFHoF?^{*}	VOHoF?^{*}
Quarterback	Joe Germaine	1996–98	no	no
Quarterback	Bobby Hoying	1993–95	no	2008
Quarterback	Rex Kern (c)	1968–70	2007	1978
Quarterback	Art Schlichter	1978–81	no	no
Quarterback	Don Scott	1938–40	no	1988
Fullback	John Brockington	1968–70	no	2002
Fullback	Ollie Cline	1944–46	no	2000
Fullback	Bob Ferguson	1959–61	1996	1987
Fullback	Pete Johnson	1973–76	no	2007
Fullback	Jim Otis	1967–69	no	1996
Halfback	Keith Byars	1982–85	2020	2000
Halfback	Howard "Hopalong" Cassady	1952–55	1979	1977
Halfback	Eddie George	1992–95	2011	2006
Halfback	Archie Griffin (c)	1972–75	1986	1981
Halfback	Chic Harley	1916–17, 1919	1951	1977
Halfback	Les Horvath	1940–42, 1944	1969	1977
Halfback	Vic Janowicz	1949–51	1976	1977
Halfback	Gaylord Stinchcomb	1917, 1919–20	1973	1978
Wide receiver	David Boston	1996–98	no	no
Wide receiver	Cris Carter	1984–86	no	2003
Wide receiver	Doug Donley	1977–80	no	no
Wide receiver	Joey Galloway	1991, 1993–94	no	2015
Wide receiver	Terry Glenn	1993–95	no	no
Wide receiver	Paul Warfield	1961–63	no	1979
Tight end	Wes Fesler	1928–30	1954	1977
Tight end	John Frank	1980–83	no	1998
Tight end	Esco Sarkkinen	1937–39	no	1980
Tight end	Bob Shaw	1941–42	no	1996
Tight end	Merle Wendt	1934–36	no	1981
Tight end	Jan White	1968–70	no	1988
Center	Tom DeLeone	1969–71	no	2002
Center	Gomer Jones	1934–35	1978	1978
Center	Steve Myers	1972–74	no	2004
Offensive guard	Warren Amling	1944–46	1984	1981
Offensive guard	Lindell Houston	1941–42	no	1991
Offensive guard	Iolas Huffman	1918–21	no	1980
Offensive guard	Jim Lachey	1981–84	no	1999
Offensive guard	Jim Parker	1954–56	1974	1977
Offensive guard	Gust Zarnas	1935–37	1975	1978
Offensive tackle	John Hicks	1970, 1972–73	2001	1985
Offensive tackle	Jim Marshall	1956–57	no	1978
Offensive tackle	Orlando Pace	1994–96	2013	2011
Offensive tackle	Kurt Schumacher	1972–74	no	2005
Offensive tackle	Korey Stringer	1992–94	no	2003
Offensive tackle	Chris Ward	1974–77	no	1989
Defensive end	Bob Brudzinski	1973–76	no	1993
Defensive end	Van DeCree	1972–74	no	1990
Defensive end	Dean Dugger	1952–54	no	1995
Defensive end	Jim Houston	1957–59	2005	1979
Defensive end	Matt Snell	1961–63	no	no
Defensive end	Mike Vrabel	1993–96	no	2012
Defensive lineman	Aaron Brown	1974–77	no	2021
Defensive lineman	Chuck Csuri	1941, 1942, 1946	no	1993
Defensive lineman	Pete Cusick	1972–74	no	2012
Defensive lineman	Jerome Foster	1979–82	no	no
Defensive lineman	Jim Stillwagon	1968–70	1991	1979
Defensive lineman	Dan Wilkinson	1992–93	no	no
Defensive lineman	Bill Willis	1942–44	1971	1977
Linebacker	Tom Cousineau	1975–78	2016	1995
Linebacker	Randy Gradishar	1971–73	1998	1983
Linebacker	Pepper Johnson	1982–85	no	2001
Linebacker	Andy Katzenmoyer	1996–98	no	2009
Linebacker	Ike Kelley	1963–65	no	1983
Linebacker	Marcus Marek	1979–82	no	1999
Linebacker	Chris Spielman (c)	1984–87	2009	2000
Linebacker	Steve Tovar	1989–92	no	2001
Defensive back	Arnie Chonko	1962–64	no	1982
Defensive back	Neal Colzie	1972–75	no	2009
Defensive back	Tim Fox	1972–75	no	1998
Defensive back	Ray Griffin	1974–77	no	2012
Defensive back	Mike Sensibaugh	1968–70	no	1997
Defensive back	Shawn Springs	1994–96	no	2022
Defensive back	Jack Tatum (c)	1968–70	2004	1981
Defensive back	Antoine Winfield	1995–98	no	2014
Punter	Brent Bartholomew	1995–98	no	no
Punter	Tom Skladany	1973–76	no	1991
Punter	Tom Tupa	1984–87	no	2022
Kicker	Vlade Janakievski	1977–80	no	2004
Kicker	Rich Spangler	1982–85	no	no
Kicker	Tim Williams	1990–93	no	no
Head Coach	Paul Brown	1941–1943	no	1991
Head Coach	Earle Bruce	1979–1987	2002	2004
Head Coach	John Cooper	1988–2000	2008	2013
Head Coach	Woody Hayes	1951–1978	1983	1978
Head Coach	John Wilce	1913–1928	1954	1977

=== Table notes ===
^{*} CFHoF? notes whether the person has been inducted into the College Football Hall of Fame; VOHoF? notes whether the person has been inducted into the Ohio State Varsity O Hall of Fame.
(c) – All-Century captains

== Notes regarding selections ==
- Notable Buckeyes not chosen to the team include College Football Hall of Fame players Jim Daniell and Aurealius Thomas, Hall of Fame coaches Francis Schmidt and Howard Jones, Big Ten Conference MVPs Jack Graf and Cornelius Greene, and three-time All-America selection Lew Hinchman.
- Players lettering before 1960 could have been selected for either offensive or defensive positions. Selecting Jim Marshall as an offensive tackle was ironic, given that he played professionally for 20 years as a defensive lineman, primarily with the Minnesota Vikings.
- Matt Snell played for the Buckeyes as a halfback in 1961, a defensive end in 1962, and a fullback in 1963. He was the Buckeye Season MVP in 1963 and AFL Rookie of the Year in 1964 (with the New York Jets) as a fullback, but was selected here as a defensive end.
- Paul Warfield was a halfback for the Buckeyes in 1961 and 1962, and a tight end in 1963. He was selected here as a wide receiver, the position he played professionally with the Cleveland Browns and Miami Dolphins.
- Les Horvath was a halfback in 1940, 1941 and 1942, and a quarterback in his Heisman Trophy winning season of 1944. He was selected here as a halfback.
