= Ohio State Varsity O Hall of Fame =

College sports hall of fame

The Ohio State Varsity "O" Hall of Fame is the athletic hall of fame for The Ohio State University. Its purpose is to recognize individuals who have contributed to the honor and fame of the university in the field of athletics.

An athlete must have earned at least one Varsity "O" letter to be eligible. An athlete is considered for recognition a minimum of five years after the graduation of his or her class. A coach or member of the athletic department must have served the Ohio State University for at least 15 years to be considered.

== Charter members ==
The first 23 members of the Varsity "O" Hall of Fame were inducted in September, 1977. These are the names of those charter inductees:

- Howard "Hopalong" Cassady — football, baseball
- Paul Ebert — basketball, baseball
- Wes Fesler — football, basketball, baseball, football coach
- Ernie Godfrey — football, basketball, football coach
- Chic Harley — football, basketball, baseball, track & field
- John Havlicek — basketball, baseball
- Les Horvath — football
- Jimmy Hull — basketball
- Vic Janowicz — football
- Ford Konno — swimming
- Jerry Lucas — basketball
- Johnny Miner — basketball
- Jack Nicklaus — golf
- Jesse Owens — track & field
- Jim Parker — football
- Al Patnik — diving
- Mike Peppe — swimming/diving coach
- George Simpson — track & field
- Bill Smith — swimming
- Larry Snyder — track
- Lynn St. John — athletic director
- John Wilce — football coach
- Bill Willis — football, track & field

== Notable members ==
Notable members include:

=== Men ===
Name	Sport	Years
Dave Albritton	track & field	1935-37
Warren Amling	basketball	1944-46
Miller Anderson	diving	1942, 46-48
Tim Anderson	football	1968-70
Steve Arlin	baseball	1965-66
Doug Beal	volleyball	1969
Charles Beetham	track & field	1934-36
William M. Bell	football	1929-31
LeCharles Bentley	football	1998-01
Aldis Berzins	volleyball	1975-78
Raj Bhavsar	gymnastics	2000-03
Gary Bradds	basketball	1962-64
Chuck Brinkman	baseball	1964-66
John Brockington	football	1968-70
Bob Brudzinski	football	1973-76
Keith Byars	football	1982-85
Tom Byers	track & field	1974-76
Cris Carter	football	1984-86
Howard "Hopalong" Cassady	football	1953-55
Howard "Hopalong" Cassady	baseball	1954-56
Galen Cisco	baseball	1955-57
Galen Cisco	football	1955-57
Jim Cleamons	basketball	1969-71
Dick Cleveland	swimming	1952-54
Ollie Cline	football	1944-45, 47
Bob Clotworthy	diving	1951-53
Neal Colzie	football	1972-74
Mike Conley Jr.	basketball	2007
John Cook	golf	1976-79
James "Doc" Counsilman	swimming	1943, 46-47
Tom Cousineau	football	1975-78
Charles Csuri	football	1941-42
Cookie Cunningham	football	1923-25
Cookie Cunningham	basketball	1924-26
Jim Daniell	football	1939-41
Glenn Davis	track & field	1956-59
Van DeCree	football	1972-74
Tom DeLeone	football	1969-71
Terrence Dials	basketball	2002, 04-06
Mike Doss	football	1999-02
Dean Dugger	football	1952-54
Jack Dugger	basketball	1941-43
Jack Dugger	track & field	1941-43
Jack Dugger	football	1942-44
Mike Durant	baseball	1989-91
Tippy Dye	football	1934-36
Tippy Dye	basketball	1935-37
Paul Ebert	baseball	1951, 54-55
Paul Ebert	basketball	1952-54
Johnny Edwards	baseball	1958
Boaz Ellis (Israel)	fencing	2004-06
Gene Fekete	football	1942
Bob Ferguson	football	1959-61
Wes Fesler	football	1928-30
Dave Foley	football	1966-68
Dave Foley	track & field	1967-69
Tim Fox	football	1973-76
John Frank	football	1980-83
Robin Freeman	basketball	1954-56
Joey Galloway	football	1991-94
Eddie George	football	1992-95
Fletcher Gilders	diving	1954-56
Sid Gillman	football	1931-33
Ernie Godfrey	football	1912-14
Ernie Godfrey	basketball	1914-15
Francisco González (Paraguay)	tennis	1974-76
Randy Gradishar	football	1971-73
Jack Graf	football	1938-40
Jack Graf	basketball	1939-41
Don Grate	baseball	1944-45
Don Grate	basketball	1944-45
Cornelius Greene	football	1972-75
Joe Greene	track & field	1987-90
Archie Griffin	football	1972-75
Ray Griffin	football	1974-77
Bill Hackett	football	1942-44
Bruce Harlan	diving	1947-50
Bruce Harlan	gymnastics	1947-50
Chic Harley	football	1916-17
Chic Harley	track & field	1917
Chic Harley	baseball	1917-19
Chic Harley	basketball	1920-21
Donald Harper	diving	1956-58
Donald Harper	gymnastics	1956-58
John Havlicek	baseball	1960-61
John Havlicek	basketball	1960-62
Ed Hess	football	1925-27
John Hicks	football	1970, 72-73
John Higgins	swimming	1938-40
Halo Hirose	swimming	1946-48
Jerry Holan	swimming	1952-53
Dennis Hopson	basketball	1984-87
Allan Hornyak	basketball	1971-73
Les Horvath	football	1940-42, 44
Bill Hosket, Jr.	basketball	1966-68
Bill Hosket, Sr.	basketball	1932-33
Jim Houston	football	1957-59
Lin Houston	football	1941-42
Frank Howard	basketball	1956-58
Frank Howard	baseball	1957-59
Bobby Hoying	football	1993-95
Iolas Huffman	football	1918-20
Iolas Huffman	baseball	1919-21
Jimmy Hull	basketball	1937-39
Jim Jackson	basketball	1990-92
Vlade Janakievski	football	1977-80
Vic Janowicz	football	1949-51
Patrick Jeffrey	diving	1984-86, 88
Pepper Johnson	football	1982-85
Pete Johnson	football	1973-76
Gomer Jones	football	1934-35
Marty Karow	baseball	1924-26
Marty Karow	football	1924-26
Andy Katzenmoyer	football	1996-98
Jack Keller	track & field	1931-33
Ike Kelley	football	1963-65
Clark Kellogg	basketball	1980-82
Rex Kern	football	1968-70
Bobby Knight (Note: lifetime achievement award)	basketball	1960-62
Ford Konno	swimming	1952-55
Jim Lachey	football	1981-84
Dick Larkins	football	1928-30
Dick Larkins	basketball	1929-30
Dick LeBeau	football	1956-58
Jack Lininger	football	1945, 47-49
Jerry Lucas	basketball	1960-62
Jamie Macoun (Canada)	ice hockey	1981-83
Marcus Marek	football	1979-82
Jim Marshall	football	1957-58
Tom Matte	football	1957-60
Rufus Mayes	football	1966-68
Jim McDonald	football	1935-37
Jim McDonald	basketball	1936-38
Bill McKenzie (Canada)	ice hockey	1970-72
Bob Momsen	football	1950
Fred "Curly" Morrison	football	1946-49
Keo Nakama	swimming	1943-45
Keo Nakama	baseball	1944-45
Jamie Natalie	gymnastics	1998-01
Jack Nicklaus	golf	1960-61
Tom Nieporte	golf	1950-51
Mel Nowell	basketball	1960-62
Ron O'Brien	diving	1957-59
Ron O'Brien	gymnastics	1957-59
Jim Otis	football	1967-69
Jesse Owens	track & field	1934-35
Yoshi Oyakawa	swimming	1952-55
Orlando Pace	football	1994-96
Lance Palmer	wrestling	2006-10
Jim Parker	football	1954-56
Scoonie Penn	basketball	1999-00
Pete Perini	football	1946-49
Pete Perini	baseball	1947-50
Chris Perry	golf	1981-84
Paul Pooley (Canada)	ice hockey	1981-84
Ted Provost	football	1967-69
Mike Racanelli	gymnastics	1987-90
Kevin Randleman	wrestling	1991-93
Kelvin Ransey	basketball	1977-80
Leo Raskowski	football	1926-28
Pete Rasmus	track & field	1927-29
Michael Redd	Basketball	1998-00
Butch Reynolds	track & field	1986-87
Arnie Risen	basketball	1944-45
Tommy Rowlands	wrestling	2001-04
Esco Sarkkinen	football	1937-39
Paul Sarringhaus	football	1941-42
Pandel Savic	football	1947-49
Dick Schafrath	football	1956-58
Dick Schnittker	basketball	1948-50
Dick Schnittker	football	1949
Kurt Schumacher	football	1971-74
Don Scott	football	1938-40
Mike Sensibaugh	football	1968-70
Bob Shaw	football	1941-42
Larry Siegfried	basketball	1959-61
George Simpson	track & field	1928-30
Joey Sindelar	golf	1979-81
Tom Skladany	football	1972, 74-76
Bill Smith	swimming	1943, 47-49
Chris Smith	golf	1988-91
Troy Smith	football	2003-06
Larry Snyder	track & field	1922-24
Dave Sorenson	basketball	1968-70
Cecil Souders	football	1942-47
Tim Spencer	football	1979-82
Chris Spielman	football	1984-87
Harry Steel	football	1922-23
Harry Steel	wrestling	1923-24
Jim Stillwagon	football	1968-70
Gaylord Stinchcomb	basketball	1912
Gaylord Stinchcomb	football	1917, 19-20
Gaylord Stinchcomb	track & field	1921
Korey Stringer	football	1992-94
Jack Tatum	football	1968-70
Fred Taylor	baseball	1947-50
Fred Taylor	basketball	1949-50
Jack Taylor	swimming	1950-52
Aurealius Thomas	football	1955-57
Steve Tovar	football	1989-91
George Trautman	baseball	1912-14
Evan Turner	basketball	2008-10
Jeff Uhlenhake	football	1985-88
Doug Van Horn	football	1963-65
Bob Vogel	football	1960-62
Mike Vrabel	football	1993-96
Mark Waldie	volleyball	1974-77
Chris Ward	football	1974-77
Paul Warfield	football	1961-63
Paul Warfield	track & field	1962-63
Nick Wasylik	basketball	1934
Nick Wasylik	football	1934-37
Nick Wasylik	baseball	1935-38
Bobby Watkins	football	1952-54
Tom Weiskopf	golf	1962
Merle Wendt	football	1934-36
Bob White	football	1957-59
Jan White	football	1968-70
Mal Whitfield	track & field	1945-49
Albert Wiggins	swimming	1954-56
Herb Williams	basketball	1978-81
Bill Willis	football	1942-44
Bill Willis	track & field	1942-43
Blaine Wilson	gymnastics	1994-97
Antoine Winfield	football	1995-98
Gust Zarnas	football	1935-37

=== Women ===
Name	Sport	Years
Tessa Bonhomme (Canada)	ice hockey	2003-05, 07-08
Jessica Davenport	basketball	2004-07
Lara Dickenmann (Switzerland)	soccer	2004-07
Tracey Hall	basketball	1985-88
Rosie Jones	golf	1979-81
Karen Josephson	synchronized swimming	1977-81
Sarah Josephson	synchronized swimming	1982-85
Emma Laaksonen (Finland)	ice hockey	2001-04
Jantel Lavender	basketball	2008-11
Meg Mallon	golf	1982-85
Christina Manning	track & field	2009-12
Kelly McCormick	diving	1982-83
Carolina Moraes (Brazil)	synchronized swimming	1999-02
Isabela Moraes (Brazil)	synchronized swimming	1999-02
Katie Smith	basketball	1993-96
Natalie Spooner (Canada)	ice hockey	2008-12
Amy Tucker	basketball	1978-82

=== Coaches ===
Name	Sport	Years
Doug Beal	volleyball (men's)	1972-74
Paul Brown	football	1941-43
Earle Bruce	football	1979-87
John Cooper	football	1988-00
Nancy Darsch	basketball (women's)	1986-97
Tippy Dye	basketball (men's)	1947-50
Jack Graf	basketball (men's)	1944-70
Woody Hayes	football	1951-78
Russ Hellickson	wrestling	1986-06
Marty Karow	baseball	1950-75
Esco Sarkkinen	football	1946-78
Larry Snyder	track & field (men's)	1932-42, 46-65
Floyd Stahl	baseball	1947-50
Floyd Stahl	basketball (men's)	1951-59
Floyd Stahl	golf (men's)	1966
Fred Taylor	basketball (men's)	1959-75
Bob Todd	baseball	1988-10
John Wilce	football	1913-28

=== Administration ===
Name	position	Years
Dick Larkins	athletics director	1946-70
Lynn St. John	athletics director	1912-47
George Trautman	assistant athletics director	?
