= 2007 College Football Hall of Fame inductees =

The 2007 College Football Hall of Fame inductees were chosen by a ballot which consisted of 75 players and 8 coaches who were voted on by more than twelve-thousand voters for inclusion into the College Football Hall of Fame. The 2007 class was announced at a press conference in New York City at the Waldorf-Astoria Hotel on May 9, 2007, and was inducted at The National Football Foundation’s 50th Awards Dinner on December 4, 2007, also at the Waldorf-Astoria. They were then enshrined into the hall of fame in South Bend, Indiana in the summer of 2008.

Once nominated for consideration, all player candidates were submitted to one of eight District Screening Committees, depending on their geographic location, which conducted a vote to determine who appeared on the ballot and represented their respective districts. Each year, 15 candidates, who are not selected for the Hall of Fame, will be named automatic holdovers and will bypass the district screening process and automatically appear on the ballot the following year.

Joe Paterno was inducted this year as well, despite not being on this ballot. He was voted in on the 2006 ballot but was unable to attend the induction due to a sideline injury.

== Inductees ==
Players

- Tom Brahaney, Oklahoma, C
- Dave Brown, Michigan, DB
- Jeff Davis, Clemson, LB
- Doug Flutie, Boston College, QB
- Johnnie Johnson, Texas, DB
- Rex Kern, Ohio State, QB
- Ahmad Rashad, Oregon, RB/WR
- Anthony Thompson, Indiana, RB
- Wilson Whitley, Houston, DT
- Reggie Williams, Dartmouth, LB
- Richard Wood, Southern Cal, LB
- Chris Zorich, Notre Dame, DT

Coach

- Herb Deromedi, Central Michigan

== Players ==
To be eligible for the ballot, players must have:

- Been named a First Team All-America by a major/national selector as recognized and utilized by the NCAA for their consensus All-America teams;
- Played their last year of intercollegiate football at least ten years prior;
- Played within the last 50 years (since 1957 for the 2007 ballot, making three candidates, Don Stephenson, Jim Taylor, and Clendon Thomas their last year eligible to be voted in);
- Cannot be currently playing professional football.

The candidate’s post-football record as a citizen was also weighed.

The University of Notre Dame led this year's ballot with 8 nominations followed by the University of Southern California with 5 and the Ohio State University and University of Oklahoma tied with 3 each.

Name	School(s)	Position	Last year played
Troy Aikman	Oklahoma; UCLA	Quarterback	1988
Trev Alberts	Nebraska	Linebacker	1993
Otis Armstrong	Purdue	Running back	1972
Pervis Atkins	New Mexico State	Running back	1960
Tony Boselli	Southern California	Offensive tackle	1994
Tom Brahaney	Oklahoma	Center	1972
Dave Brown	Michigan	Defensive back	1974
Tim Brown	Notre Dame	Wide receiver	1987
Mark Carrier	Southern California	Safety	1989
Dave Casper	Notre Dame	Offensive tackle/tight end	1973
Ronnie Caveness	Arkansas	Center	1964
Bob Crable	Notre Dame	Linebacker	1981
Randy Cross	UCLA	Offensive guard	1975
Randall Cunningham	UNLV	Punter/Quarterback	1984
Sam Cunningham	Southern California	Running back	1972
Jeff Davis	Clemson	Linebacker	1981
Eric Dickerson	Southern Methodist	Running back	1982
Jim Dombrowski	Virginia	Offensive tackle	1985
D. J. Dozier	Penn State	Running back	1986
Ed Dyas	Auburn	Fullback	1960
Bill Enyart	Oregon State	Fullback	1968
Pat Fitzgerald	Northwestern	Linebacker	1996
Doug Flutie	Boston College	Quarterback	1984
Kirk Gibson	Michigan State	Wide receiver	1978
Bob Golic	Notre Dame	Linebacker	1978
Terrence Hanratty	Notre Dame	Quarterback	1968
Al Harris	Arizona State	Defensive end	1978
Major Harris	West Virginia	Quarterback	1989
Mark Herrmann	Purdue	Quarterback	1980
Dick Jauron	Yale	Running back	1972
Johnnie Johnson	Texas	Safety	1979
Rex Kern	Ohio State	Quarterback	1970
Tommy Kramer	Rice	Quarterback	1976
George Kunz	Notre Dame	Offensive tackle	1968
Jess Lewis	Oregon State	Defensive tackle	1969
Robert Lytle	Michigan	Running back	1976
Rueben Mayes	Washington State	Running back	1985
Randall McDaniel	Arizona State	Offensive guard	1987
Pat McInally	Harvard	Tight end	1974
Marlin McKeever	Southern California	Tight end	1960
Don McPherson	Syracuse	Quarterback	1987
George Mira	Miami (Fla.)	Quarterback	1963
Art Monk	Syracuse	Wide receiver	1979
Paul Naumoff	Tennessee	Linebacker	1966
Bob Novogratz	Army	Offensive guard	1958
Tom Nowatzke	Indiana	Fullback	1964
Jim Otis	Ohio State	Fullback	1969
Dave Parks	Texas Tech	Wide receiver	1963
Ahmad Rashad	Oregon	Running back	1971
Deion Sanders	Florida State	Defensive back	1988
Lucius Sanford	Georgia Tech	Linebacker	1977
Jake Scott	Georgia	Defensive back	1968
Larry Seivers	Tennessee	Wide receiver	1976
Jim Seymour	Notre Dame	Wide receiver	1968
Ron Simmons	Florida State	Nose guard	1980
Chris Spielman	Ohio State	Linebacker	1987
Larry Station	Iowa	Linebacker	1985
Don Stephenson	Georgia Tech	Center	1957
Darryl Talley	West Virginia	Linebacker	1982
Jim Taylor	Louisiana State	Fullback	1957
Lawrence Taylor	North Carolina	Linebacker	1980
Marvin Terrell	Mississippi	Offensive Guard/Nose guard	1959
Clendon Thomas	Oklahoma	Running back	1957
Thurman Thomas	Oklahoma State	Running back	1987
Anthony Thompson	Indiana	Running back	1989
Gino Torretta	Miami (Fla.)	Quarterback	1992
Don Trull	Baylor	Quarterback	1963
Curt Warner	Penn State	Running back	1982
Wilson Whitley	Houston	Defensive tackle	1976
Clarence Williams	Washington State	Running back	1974
Reggie Williams	Dartmouth	Linebacker	1975
Scott Woerner	Georgia	Defensive back	1980
Richard Wood	Southern California	Linebacker	1974
Ryan Yarborough	Wyoming	Wide receiver	1993
Chris Zorich	Notre Dame	Defensive tackle	1990

== Coaches ==
To be eligible for the ballot, coaches must have:

- Coached a minimum of 10 years and 100 games as a head coach;
- Won at least 60% (.600+) of their games;
- Be retired from coaching or over the age of 75.

The candidate’s post-football record as a citizen was also weighed.

Jim Donnan led the 2007 ballot with the highest winning percentage (.722). However, John Cooper had the most wins (193) and most seasons as head coach (24). Herb Deromedi had the longest tenure at one school with 16 years at Central Michigan University.

Name	School(s)	Years	Record	Pct.
John Cooper	Tulsa	1977–84	56–32	.636
John Cooper	Arizona State	1985–87	25–9–2	.735
John Cooper	Ohio State	1988–2000	111–43–4	.721
John Cooper	Total	24 years	193–83–6	.695
Herb Deromedi	Central Michigan	1978-93	110-55-10	.657
Herb Deromedi	Total	16 years	110-55-10	.657
William Henry Dietz	Washington State	1915-17	17-2-1	.895
William Henry Dietz	Purdue	1921	1-6	.143
William Henry Dietz	Louisiana Tech	1922-23	11-3-1	.786
William Henry Dietz	Wyoming	1924-26	10-13-2	.435
William Henry Dietz	Haskell Indian Institute (KS)	1929-32	57-38-3	.600
William Henry Dietz	Albright (PA)	1937-42	57-38-3	.600
William Henry Dietz	Total	19 years	96-62-7	.603
Jim Donnan	Georgia	1996–2000	40-19	.678
Jim Donnan	Marshall	1990-95	64-21	.842
Jim Donnan	Total	11 years	104-40	.722
Wayne Hardin	Navy	1959-64	38-22-2	.633
Wayne Hardin	Temple	1970-82	80-52-3	.606
Wayne Hardin	Total	19 years	118-74-5	.612
Dick MacPherson	Massachusetts	1971-77	45-27-1	.625
Dick MacPherson	Syracuse	1981-90	66-46-4	.589
Dick MacPherson	Total	17 years	111-73-5	.601
Billy J. Murphy	Memphis State	1958-71	91-44-1	.673
Billy J. Murphy	Total	14 years	91-44-1	.673
Darryl Rogers	Cal State-Hayward	1965	3-7	.300
Darryl Rogers	Fresno State	1966-72	43-32-1	.573
Darryl Rogers	San José State	1973-75	22-9-3	.710
Darryl Rogers	Michigan State	1976-79	24-18-2	.571
Darryl Rogers	Arizona State	1980-84	37-18-1	.673
Darryl Rogers	Total	20 years	129-84-7	.602

== Sources ==
- 2007 Ballot for College Football Hall of Fame Announced, 2007-03-11, accessed 2007-03-21
