= 1969 All-Big Ten Conference football team =

American college football all-star team

The 1969 All-Big Ten Conference football team consists of American football players chosen by various organizations for All-Big Ten Conference teams for the 1969 Big Ten Conference football season.

== Offensive selections ==
=== Quarterbacks ===
- Mike Phipps, Purdue (AP-1; UPI-1)
- Rex Kern, Ohio State (AP-2; UPI-2)

=== Running backs ===
- John Isenbarger, Indiana (AP-1; UPI-1)
- Jim Otis, Ohio State (AP-1; UPI-1)
- Mike Adamle, Northwestern (AP-1)
- Billy Taylor, Michigan (AP-2; UPI-1)
- Stan Brown, Purdue (AP-2; UPI-2)
- Jim Carter, Minnesota (UPI-2)
- Barry Mayer, Minnesota (UPI-2)

=== Ends ===
- Jim Mandich, Michigan (AP-1; UPI-1)
- Ray Parson, Minnesota (AP-1)
- Jade Butcher, Indiana (AP-2; UPI-1)
- Jan White, Ohio State (AP-2; UPI-2)
- Ray Manning, Iowa (UPI-2)

=== Tackles ===
- Dan Dierdorf, Michigan (AP-1; UPI-1)
- Paul DeNuccio, Purdue (AP-1; UPI-2)
- Chuck Hutchison, Ohio State (UPI-1)
- John Bradley, Northwestern (AP-2)
- Al Hawes, Minnesota (AP-2; UPI-2)

=== Guards ===
- Ron Saul, Michigan State (AP-1; UPI-1)
- Don DeSalle, Indiana (AP-1; UPI-2)
- Jon Meskimen, Iowa (AP-2; UPI-1)
- Alan Jack, Ohio State (AP-2; UPI-2)

=== Centers ===
- Brian Donovan, Ohio State (AP-1)
- Guy Murdock, Michigan (UPI-1)
- Walter Whitehead, Purdue (AP-2; UPI-2)

== Defensive selections ==
=== Ends ===
- Dave Whitfield, Ohio State (AP-1; UPI-1)
- Mark Debeve, Ohio State (AP-1)
- Rich Saul, Michigan State (UPI-1)
- Bill McKoy, Purdue (AP-2; UPI-2)
- Cecil Pryor, Michigan (AP-2; UPI-2)

=== Tackles ===
- Paul Schmidlin, Ohio State (AP-1; UPI-1)
- Ron Curl, Michigan State (AP-1; UPI-2)
- Bill Yanchar, Purdue (AP-2; UPI-1)
- Bill Galler, Northwestern (AP-2)
- Layne McDowell, Iowa (UPI-2)

=== Middle guard ===
- Jim Stillwagon, Ohio State (AP-1; UPI-1)
- Henry Hill, Michigan (AP-2; UPI-2)

=== Linebackers ===
- Veno Paraskevas, Purdue (AP-1; UPI-1)
- Jack Tatum, Ohio State (AP-1; UPI-1 [def. back])
- Ralph Huff, Michigan (AP-1; UPI-2)
- Doug Adams, Ohio State (AP-2; UPI-1)
- Larry Ely, Iowa (AP-2)
- Don Law, Michigan State (AP-2; UPI-2)

=== Defensive backs ===
- Tom Curtis, Michigan (AP-1; UPI-1)
- Ted Provost, Ohio State (AP-1; UPI-1)
- Mike Sensibaugh, Ohio State (AP-1; UPI-1)
- Tim Foley, Purdue (AP-2; UPI-2)
- Craig Clemons, Iowa (AP-2)
- Jeff Wright, Minnesota (AP-2)
- Barry Pierson, Michigan (UPI-2)
- Tim Anderson, Ohio State (UPI-2)
- Walter Bowser, Minnesota (UPI-2)

== Key ==
AP = Associated Press, selected by the AP's Midwest board of writers and TV-radio sportcasters

UPI = United Press International, selected by Big Ten coaches

Bold = Consensus first-team selection of the AP and UPI

== See also ==
- 1969 College Football All-America Team
