= John Brockington =

American football player (1948–2023)

No. 42, 43
- Position: Running back

Personal information
- Born: September 7, 1948; Brooklyn, New York, U.S.
- Died: March 31, 2023 (aged 74); San Diego, California, U.S.
- Listed height: 6 ft 1 in (1.85 m)
- Listed weight: 225 lb (102 kg)

Career information
- High school: Jefferson (Brooklyn)
- College: Ohio State
- NFL draft: 1971: 1st round, 9th overall pick

Career history
- Green Bay Packers (1971–1977); Kansas City Chiefs (1977)

Awards and highlights
- NFL Offensive Rookie of the Year (1971); 2× First-team All-Pro (1971, 1973); 2× Second-team All-Pro (1972, 1973); 3× Pro Bowl (1971–1973); Green Bay Packers Hall of Fame; 2× National champion (1968, 1970); First-team All-American (1970); First-team All-Big Ten (1970)

Career NFL statistics
- Rushing attempts: 1,347
- Rushing yards: 5,185
- Rushing touchdowns: 30
- Stats at Pro Football Reference

John Stanley Brockington (September 7, 1948 – March 31, 2023) was an American professional football player who was a running back in the National Football League (NFL) with the Green Bay Packers and Kansas City Chiefs. He was a first round draft choice out of Ohio State University, and was the NFL Offensive Rookie of the Year in 1971.

== Early life ==
Brockington was born on September 7, 1948, in Brooklyn, New York, where he was raised in Canarsie. Brockington attended Thomas Jefferson High School, where he starred from 1963 to 1965 on the Orange Wave's football team as a running back, under coach Moe Finkelstein. His nickname in high school was "the Rock". As a senior, the 210 pound (95.3 kg) Brockington rushed for 1,205 yards in 165 attempts for a 7.3 yards per carry average. He received the most votes for the New York Daily News' 1965 Brooklyn-Queens All-Star Team. He led New York City's Public Schools Athletic League (PSAL) II in rushing. He was also named All-Metropolitan and a scholastic All-American.

In the early 1970s, after being approached by Finkelstein about obtaining weight machines for the Jefferson players, Brockington gifted the school a modern weight training facility.

== College career ==
Ohio State Buckeyes' offensive backfield coach Larry Catuzzi scouted and recruited Brockington, and recommended to head coach Woody Hayes that Brockington be given a football scholarship to Ohio State. Brockington played varsity halfback and fullback for the Buckeyes from 1968 to 1970. He was a freshman with the so-called Super Sophomores who led the Buckeyes to an undefeated season and a consensus national championship in 1968. Brockington and the other Super Sophomores finished their college careers with a record of 27–2.

Jim Otis was a year ahead of Brockington's class, and was the starting fullback during Brockington's first two varsity seasons, with 884 yards on 189 carries during the 1968 championship season and 1,027 yards on 225 carries in 1969. Otis was an All-American in 1969, and seventh in Heisman Trophy voting. Still, the coaching staff wanted Brockington to start as the principal running back even as a sophomore, but Hayes vetoed them.

Brockington played left halfback in 1968 and 1969, in an offensive backfield that included Otis at fullback, Rex Kern at quarterback, and Lawrence Zelina at right halfback. Kern threw less than 70 passes during each of those years, but rushed 119 times for 499 yards in 1968, and 109 times for 583 yards in 1969. Brockington was used primarily as a blocker for Otis and Kern those two years. As a sophomore, he had only 43 rushing attempts for 181 yards, and 72 attempts for 334 yards as a junior.

In 1970, after Otis graduated, Brockington moved to fullback and was the featured running back in Hayes's offense. Brockington finished his senior season with 1,142 rushing yards, which was at the time an Ohio State single-season record. Brockington also scored 17 rushing touchdowns that season. His 15 regular season touchdowns led the Big Ten. He was the second player, after Otis, to rush for over 1,000 yards as a Buckeye. He was a first-team All-American and All-Big Ten as a senior.

Ohio State won the Big Ten Championship and had a 9–0 record on the season, but lost to Stanford and its Heisman Trophy winning quarterback Jim Plunkett in the January 1, 1971 Rose Bowl. Brockington scored two touchdowns in the first half. Ohio State was ahead in the game late into the third period, 17–13, when Brockington was stopped on a fourth down run. Plunkett led Stanford to two unanswered touchdowns, winning the game 27–17.

== Professional career ==
The Green Bay Packers selected Brockington in the first round with the ninth overall selection in the 1971 NFL draft. Brockington became the first NFL player to ever rush for 1,000 or more yards in each of his first three seasons. Brockington was one of the first running backs to combine brute force with speed. Coming out of college, he was noted for his power to gain tough yards, combined with the speed to rush for long gains.

With a running style based on his great strength, Brockington epitomized the power running back – a player who preferred to break tackles and run over defenders rather than run away from them. His collision with Cincinnati Bengals' safety Ken Dyer resulted in a neck injury to Dyer that paralyzed Dyer for weeks, and from which he never fully recovered. In a game against the Miami Dolphins, Brockington ran over safety Jake Scott, leaving Scott unconscious for ten minutes. In a game against the Denver Broncos, Brockington's knee broke Broncos' defender George Hoey's jaw and knocked out many of his teeth. The Packers may have later believed that his decline in play toward the end of his career, while still under 30-years old, arose out of Brockington's growing concern in not wanting to hurt other players.

In his rookie year of 1971 with the National Football Conference's (NFC) Green Bay Packers, Brockington was named NFL Offensive Rookie of the Year by the Associated Press (AP), rushing for 1,105 yards on 216 attempts, a 5.1 yards per carry (YPC) in 14 games. At the time, he was only the fourth rookie ever to rush for 1,000 yards, along with Beattie Feathers, Cookie Gilchrist and Paul Robinson. He was unanimously selected by fellow players as the NFC's Bert Bell Trophy winner for outstanding rookie, given by the Newspaper Enterprise Association (NEA). He was also named Rookie of the Year by United Press International (UPI), and The Sporting News.

In 1971, he was the second-leading rusher in the NFL, first in the NFC, behind Floyd Little's 1,133 yards; and second to Larry Csonka (5.4) in yards per carry. In addition to his numerous Rookie-of-the-Year awards, he was selected to the Pro Bowl and was named first-team All-Pro by the AP, NEA, Pro Football Writers and Pro Football Weekly. His first running mate in the Green Bay backfield was sixth-year halfback Donny Anderson, another Packer first round draft choice, who had over 1,000 yards from scrimmage that year (757 rushing yards and 306 receiving yards). The Packers, however, finished the season with a 4–8–2 record.

In 1972, Brockington rushed for 1,027 yards on 274 attempts; his yards per carry falling to 3.7. He had eight rushing touchdowns. He also had 16 receptions for 243 yards and one touchdown reception. Anderson had been at odds with team coach and general manager Dan Devine and played 1971 without a contract. Anderson was traded to the St. Louis Cardinals for another power-style running back, MacArthur Lane, who had a similarly poor relationship with the Cardinals. In 1972, Lane rushed for 821 yards on 177 carries, and had 285 receiving yards for the Packers; giving the Packers two backs each with over 1,000 yards from scrimmage for a second straight year.

The Packers record rose to 10–4 and they won the NFC Central Division; but lost to the Washington Redskins in the first round of the playoffs, 16–3, with Brockington gaining only nine yards on 13 carries. This was their first playoff appearance since the team's Super Bowl victory in January 1968. Brockington was again selected to the Pro Bowl. He was named first-team All-Conference by the AP, The Sporting News and United Press International (UPI), and second-team All-Pro by the NEA.

In 1973, Brockington rushed for 1,144 yards on 265 attempts, averaging 4.3 yards per carry. Lane rushed for 528 yards on 170 carries. The Packers record fell to 5–7–2. He was named to the Pro Bowl for the third, and last, time; and was named first-team All-Conference by the AP, Pro Football Weekly, The Sporting News and UPI, and first-team All-Pro by the NEA and second-team All-Pro by the Pro Football Writers.

From 1971-73, Brockington started all 42 Packers games and totaled 755 regular season rushing attempts. Including his senior Ohio State season, he had 955 rushing attempts and 61 receptions over a four-year span. After the 1973 season, Brockington was drafted by the Chicago Fire of the World Football League, at a time he was seeking a substantial pay raise from the Packers.

In 1974, he had another 266 rushing attempts for the Packers, but gained only 883 yards, a 3.3 yards per carry average. Lane's record was even weaker, with a 362 rushing yards and a 2.6 yards per carry average. Brockington did have a career-high 43 receptions for another 314 yards, and led the NFL in touches (rushes plus receptions) with 309. The Packers finished the season 6–8. It was the last season Brockington started in all 14 games during a season.

Brockington's production dipped to only 434 yards rushing on 3.0 YPC in 1975 under new head coach Bart Starr. Lane was traded to the Kansas City Chiefs in July 1975 for a future draft pick. Brockington's 144 rushing attempts in 1975 were by far the fewest of his NFL career, and over 100 less than the previous season. Brockington's decline was the result of typical wear-and-tear; the trade of Lane, an excellent blocker, and an unstable offensive line, which Brockington believed hurt his running ability; and changes in the Packers' playbook that did not take advantage of Brockington's abilities. In 1976, he had 406 yards rushing with 3.5 YPC, and had demanded a trade during the year over his differences in offensive philosophy with Bart Starr and offensive coordinator Paul Roach.

After the first game of the 1977 season, Brockington was released by the Packers. He was in the option year of a three-year contract at a high salary, and the Packers could not find a team willing to trade for Brockington. Signed by the struggling Kansas City Chiefs three weeks later to replace an injured MacArthur Lane, he appeared in ten games for them, gaining 161 yards in 54 attempts. Brockington began training camp with the Chiefs in 1978, but was restricted by a pulled hamstring. He then tried out for the Detroit Lions, but was cut in training camp before the 1978 season started. Brockington never played in the NFL again.

Brockington retired with the second most rushing yards in Packers franchise history with 5,024 yards. As of December 2022, Brockington ranks fourth in all-time rushing yards as a Packer.

== Honors ==
Brockington was inducted into the Green Bay Packers Hall of Fame in 1984.

Brockington was selected onto the Buckeyes' All-Century Team in 2000, and was elected into the Varsity O Hall of Fame in 2002.

== NFL career statistics ==
Legend
**Bold**	Career high

=== Regular season ===
Year	Team	Games		Rushing					Receiving				
Year	Team	GP	GS	Att	Yds	Avg	Lng	TD	Rec	Yds	Avg	Lng	TD
1971	GNB	**14**	**14**	216	1,105	**5.1**	52	4	14	98	7.0	29	**1**
1972	GNB	**14**	**14**	**274**	1,027	3.7	30	**8**	19	243	**12.8**	**48**	**1**
1973	GNB	**14**	**14**	265	**1,144**	4.3	**53**	3	16	128	8.0	37	0
1974	GNB	**14**	**14**	266	883	3.3	33	5	**43**	**314**	7.3	29	0
1975	GNB	**14**	12	144	434	3.0	19	7	33	242	7.3	21	**1**
1976	GNB	**14**	9	117	406	3.5	29	2	11	49	4.5	20	0
1977	GNB	1	0	11	25	2.3	8	0	2	1	0.5	6	0
1977	KAN	10	7	54	161	3.0	12	1	19	222	11.7	**48**	**1**
Career		95	84	1,347	5,185	3.8	53	30	157	1,297	8.3	48	4

=== Playoffs ===
Year	Team	Games		Rushing					Receiving				
Year	Team	GP	GS	Att	Yds	Avg	Lng	TD	Rec	Yds	Avg	Lng	TD
1972	GNB	**1**	**1**	**13**	**9**	**0.7**	**3**	0	**2**	**17**	**8.5**	**12**	0
Career		1	1	13	9	0.7	3	0	2	17	8.5	12	0

== John Brockington Foundation ==
Established in 2002 after receiving a kidney transplant from his future wife Diane Scott, Brockington created the John Brockington Foundation to aid others impacted by kidney disease. They provide free screenings and educational material to those who require it, and also provide food vouchers for people on dialysis. Kidney drives also aid those seeking new kidneys.

== Personal life ==
Brockington became an insurance salesman in La Jolla, California after his football career ended. He later pleaded guilty to evading federal income taxes on the sale of unregistered securities for an investment firm in La Jolla, and was subjected to 200 hours of community service.

== Death ==
Brockington died in San Diego, California on March 31, 2023, at the age of 74.
