= Bill McKoy =

American football player (born 1948)

No. 58
- Position: Middle linebacker

Personal information
- Born: July 17, 1948 (age 78); Winston-Salem, North Carolina U.S.
- Listed height: 6 ft 3 in (1.91 m)
- Listed weight: 235 lb (107 kg)

Career information
- High school: Atkins (Winston-Salem)
- College: Purdue
- NFL draft: 1970: 5th round, 115th overall pick

Career history
- Denver Broncos (1970–1972); San Francisco 49ers (1974)

Awards and highlights
- Second-team All-Big Ten (1969)

Career NFL statistics
- Games played: 44
- Games started: 9
- Stats at Pro Football Reference

William Edmond McKoy (born July 17, 1948) is an American former professional football player who was a linebacker in the National Football League (NFL).

McKoy was born in Winston-Salem, North Carolina, in 1948. He played college football for the Purdue Boilermakers. He was selected by both the Associated Press and United Press International as a second-team end on the 1969 All-Big Ten Conference football team.

He played in the NFL for the Denver Broncos from 1970 to 1972. He was traded to the Houston Oilers in July 1973. He did not appear in any NFL games during the 1973 season. In 1974, he played for the San Francisco 49ers. He appeared in 44 NFL games, nine as a starter.
