= Warren Amling =

American football and basketball player (1924–2001)

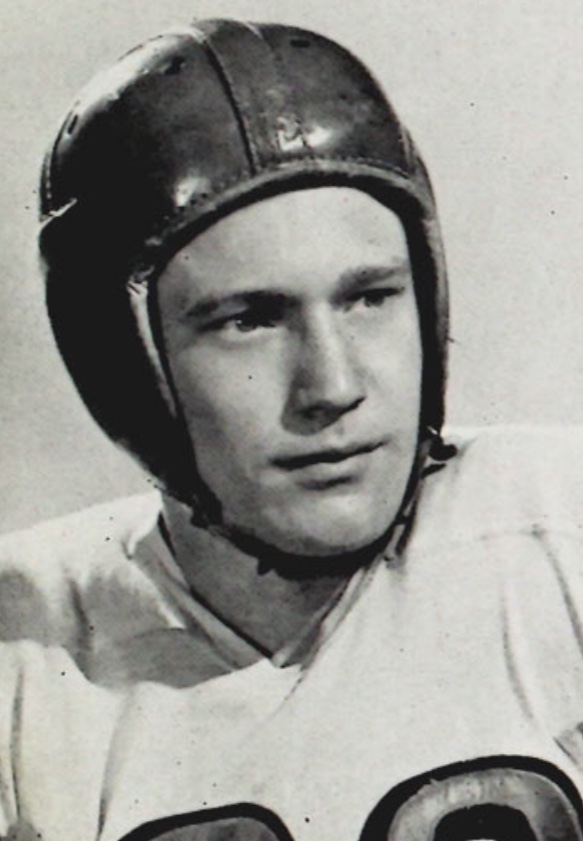
- Amling from the 1945 Makio

Profile
- Position: Guard/Tackle

Personal information
- Born: December 29, 1924; Pana, Illinois, U.S.
- Died: November 1, 2001 (age 76); Columbus, Ohio, U.S.

Career information
- College: Ohio State
- NFL draft: 1946: 11th round, 95th overall pick

Awards and highlights
- National champion (1942); 2× Consensus All-American (1945, 1946); 2× First-team All-Big Ten (1945, 1946)
- College Football Hall of Fame

Dr. Warren Eugene Amling (December 29, 1924 – November 1, 2001) was an American football and basketball player, playing for the Ohio State Buckeyes from 1944 to 1946. He was inducted into the College Football Hall of Fame in 1984.

In 1945 Amling was a consensus All-America selection at guard on the Buckeye football team and finished seventh in the vote for the Heisman Trophy In 1946 he was elected the team captain and volunteered to move to tackle, a position where the team was thinner. At this new position he was again named an All American by the Sporting News and the Football Writers Association of America. Amling was inducted into the Ohio State Varsity O Hall of Fame in 1981 and the College Football Hall of Fame in 1984, and was selected to the Ohio State Football All-Century Team (at guard) in 2000.

Amling was also a starter for the Ohio State basketball team. He is the only member of the College Football Hall of Fame to start in an NCAA Final Four game.

Amling graduated with honors from Ohio State's Veterinary Medicine School in 1947 (he wanted to attend the University of Illinois, but they did not offer a school of veterinary medicine at that time) and turned down a chance to play for the New York Giants, choosing instead to open a "large animal" practice veterinary medicine in Pana, Illinois and later to open a "small animal" practice with one of his college classmates in London, Ohio. He served as a member of the board of directors of Wittenberg University in the late 1970s.

Amling was adjunct associate professor at The Ohio State University College of Veterinary Medicine from 1983 to 1990.

He was chosen in 2000 as a member of the Ohio State Football All-Century Team.
