= Larry Snyder (hurdler) =

American track and field athlete and coach (1896–1982)

Biographical details
- Born: August 9, 1896; Canton, Ohio, U.S.
- Died: September 25, 1982 (aged 86)
- Education: Ohio State University

Playing career
- 1922–1924: Ohio State Buckeyes

Coaching career (HC unless noted)
- 1932–1942: Ohio State
- 1946–1965: Ohio State
- 1952: U.S. Olympic Team (assistant)
- 1960: U.S. Olympic Team

Accomplishments and honors

Awards
- Ohio State Varsity “O” Hall of Fame; The Ohio Association of Track and Cross Country Coaches Hall of Fame; The Drake Relays Hall of Fame; The USATF Hall of Fame (1978)

Lawrence Snyder (August 9, 1896 – September 25, 1982) was an American track and field athlete, coach, and military veteran. He served as the track and field coach at Ohio State University from 1932 to 1965.

Larry Snyder was portrayed by Jason Sudeikis in the 2016 biopic, Race, about Olympic athlete Jesse Owens.

== Early life ==
A graduate of Central High School (OH), Snyder served as a pilot instructor during World War I, later doing some stunt flying in the early 1920s. He enrolled at Ohio State University shortly thereafter and earned three letters as a high hurdler from 1922–24.

== Military career ==
Snyder was an instructor pilot in World War I and also served in the U.S. Navy in World War II.

== Coaching career ==
Snyder was due to participate in the 1924 Summer Olympics in Paris as a runner, but was injured in an airplane crash a few weeks before he was due to leave for the game. This ended his hope of an athletic career, leaving him only the option of being a coach and training others.

The most heralded athlete coached by Larry Snyder was Jesse Owens, and Coach Snyder helped improve Jesse's techniques and performance.

He gets more out of you than you ever dreamed you had. ... At the Olympic Games, he had me so fired up I couldn't miss.

— Olympic legend Jesse Owens on Snyder, Stark's Famous: Larry Snyder

Other successful athletes coached by Snyder were Dave Albritton, Glenn Davis and "Marvelous Mal" Whitfield. All told, Snyder's OSU athletes set 14 world records, won 52 All-Americans certificates and eight Olympic gold medals. Snyder was inducted into Ohio State Varsity O Hall of Fame in 1977.

== Olympic coaching career ==
Snyder was the U.S. track and field assistant coach in 1952 (Helsinki) and the head coach in 1960 (Rome). Under his coaching, the 1952 USA team won 40 medals in Helsinki and the 1960 team won 32 medals in Rome.
