= Doug Adams (American football) =

American football player (1949–1997)

No. 52
- Position: Linebacker

Personal information
- Born: November 3, 1949; Xenia, Ohio, U.S.
- Died: August 9, 1997 (aged 47); Brown County, Ohio, U.S.
- Listed height: 6 ft 1 in (1.85 m)
- Listed weight: 225 lb (102 kg)

Career information
- High school: Xenia (OH)
- College: Ohio State
- NFL draft: 1971: 7th round, 165th overall pick

Career history
- Cincinnati Bengals (1971–1974)

Awards and highlights
- 2× National champion (1968, 1970); First-team All-Big Ten (1969); Second-team All-Big Ten (1970)
- Stats at Pro Football Reference

Douglas O. Adams (November 3, 1949 – August 9, 1997) was an American professional football linebacker who played four seasons with the Cincinnati Bengals of the National Football League (NFL).

== Early life ==
Adams was the son of Armic and Edna Adams. He attended Xenia High School in Xenia, Ohio. He was named XHS MVP in 1966, MVP in the Western Ohio League in 1966, and selected to WOL, Southwestern, and All-Ohio All-Star teams. He was named 1st Team Scholastic All-American and a High School All-American in 1966. He also ran track.

Adams was named to the Xenia Athletic Hall of Fame Class of 2011.

== College career ==
Adams played college football at Ohio State University and started for three seasons at OSU, helping the Buckeyes compile a 27–2 record. He was one of the "Super Sophs," a starting linebacker who helped lead the Buckeyes to the 1968 national title. in Adams' three years, the Buckeyes won two Big 10 titles and played in two Rose Bowls.

== Professional career ==
Adams was selected by the Denver Broncos in the seventh round of the 1971 NFL draft. After he was cut by the Broncos, he was signed by the Cincinnati Bengals in early September. In his four years with the Bengals, he played in 49 games, starting 10. In 1972, his second season, he intercepted 3 passes, returning them for 44 yards.

He retired after the 1974 season at age 25 after battling a knee injury, and he returned to Ohio State to earn a dental degree.

== Personal life ==
Adams was a dentist with a practice near Mt. Orab, and he resided in Georgetown, both in Brown County, Ohio.

He died at age 47 while cycling on August 9, 1997, when he was hit by a driver who had fallen asleep.

After his death, to honor Adams, Xenia High School raised funds for the new Doug Adams Fitness Center, which opened in the fall of 2000. His career is memorialized in a display case just outside the room. The Buccaneers play in Doug Adams Stadium.
