= Mike Sensibaugh =

American football player (1949–2021)

No. 20
- Position: Safety

Personal information
- Born: January 3, 1949; Cincinnati, Ohio, U.S.
- Died: March 31, 2021 (aged 72); Wildwood, Missouri, U.S.

Career information
- High school: Lockland (Lockland, Ohio)
- College: Ohio State
- NFL draft: 1971: 8th round, 191st overall pick

Career history
- Kansas City Chiefs (1971–1975); St. Louis Cardinals (1976–1978)

Awards and highlights
- 2× National champion (1968, 1970); First-team All-American (1970); Second-team All-American (1969); 2× First-team All-Big Ten (1969, 1970); Second-team All-Big Ten (1968); Ohio State Varsity O Hall of Fame (1997); Ohio State Football All-Century Team

Career NFL statistics
- Games played: 92
- Interceptions: 27
- Touchdowns: 2
- Stats at Pro Football Reference

James Michael Sensibaugh (January 3, 1949 – March 31, 2021) was an American professional football player who was a safety in the National Football League (NFL). He played eight seasons for the Kansas City Chiefs (1971–1975) and the St. Louis Cardinals (1976–1978). Sensibaugh played college football for the Ohio State Buckeyes, where he still holds the school record for interceptions in a career with 22 and in a season with 9.
