= 1970 Ohio State Buckeyes football team =

American college football season

1970 Ohio State Buckeyes football
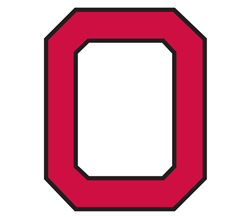

NFF co-national champion Big Ten champion

Rose Bowl, L 17–27 vs. Stanford
- Conference: Big Ten Conference

Ranking
- Coaches: No. 2
- AP: No. 5
- Record: 9–1 (7–0 Big Ten)
- Head coach: Woody Hayes (20th season)
- Offensive scheme: Heavy run
- Base defense: 5–2
- MVP: Jim Stillwagon
- Captains: Doug Adams; Rex Kern; Jim Stillwagon; Jan White
- Home stadium: Ohio Stadium

1970 Big Ten Conference football standings
	Conf.					Overall
Team	W		L		T	W		L		T
No. 5 Ohio State $	7	–	0	–	0	9	–	1	–	0
No. 9 Michigan	6	–	1	–	0	9	–	1	–	0
Northwestern	6	–	1	–	0	6	–	4	–	0
Iowa	3	–	3	–	1	3	–	6	–	1
Wisconsin	3	–	4	–	0	4	–	5	–	1
Michigan State	3	–	4	–	0	4	–	6	–	0
Minnesota	2	–	4	–	1	3	–	6	–	1
Purdue	2	–	5	–	0	4	–	6	–	0
Illinois	1	–	6	–	0	3	–	7	–	0
Indiana	1	–	6	–	0	1	–	9	–	0
$ – Conference champion; Rankings from AP Poll

The 1970 Ohio State Buckeyes football team represented Ohio State University in the Big Ten Conference during the 1970 NCAA University Division football season. The Buckeyes won all nine games in the regular season and were ranked second in both major polls. Ohio State won the Big Ten title and a berth in the Rose Bowl in Pasadena on New Year's Day against the Stanford Indians, ranked No. 12 and champions of the Pac-8. The Buckeyes were upset, 27–17, and finished with a 9–1 record.

This was the last year Ohio State played a nine-game regular-season schedule (the Big Ten first allowed a 10th regular season game in 1965). Many major colleges added an eleventh game in 1970, although no Big Ten school did so until the following season.

The Buckeyes were recognized as co-national champions, along with Texas, by the National Football Foundation at the end of the regular season. The teams were jointly awarded the MacArthur Bowl.

This was the fifth and last national title that head coach Woody Hayes won for the Buckeyes; they did not win another national championship until 2002.

Both Ohio State and Texas would go on to lose their bowl games; the 11–0–1 Nebraska Cornhuskers won the AP national championship when they finished No. 1 in final post-bowl AP Poll.

== Schedule ==
Date	Time	Opponent	Rank	Site	TV	Result	Attendance	Source
September 26	1:30 p.m.	Texas A&M*	No. 1	Ohio Stadium; Columbus, OH		W 56–13	85,657	
October 3	1:30 p.m.	Duke*	No. 1	Ohio Stadium; Columbus, OH		W 34–10	86,123	
October 10	1:30 p.m.	at Michigan State	No. 1	Spartan Stadium; East Lansing, MI		W 29–0	75,511	
October 17	1:30 p.m.	Minnesota	No. 1	Ohio Stadium; Columbus, OH		W 28–8	86,667	
October 24	2:30 p.m.	at Illinois	No. 1	Memorial Stadium; Champaign, IL (Illibuck)		W 48–29	46,208	
October 31	1:30 p.m.	No. 20 Northwestern	No. 2	Ohio Stadium; Columbus, OH		W 24–10	86,673	
November 7	2:00 p.m.	at Wisconsin	No. 3	Camp Randall Stadium; Madison, WI		W 24–7	72,758	
November 14	1:00 p.m.	at Purdue	No. 3	Ross–Ade Stadium; West Lafayette, IN	ABC	W 10–7	68,157	
November 21	1:00 p.m.	No. 4 Michigan	No. 5	Ohio Stadium; Columbus, OH (rivalry)	ABC	W 20–9	87,331	
January 1, 1971	5:00 p.m.	vs. No. 12 Stanford*	No. 2	Rose Bowl; Pasadena, CA (Rose Bowl)	NBC	L 17–27	103,839	
*Non-conference game; Rankings from AP Poll released prior to the game; All times are in Eastern time

== Game summaries ==
=== Texas A&M ===
Texas A&M Aggies (2–0) at Ohio State Buckeyes (0–0)

Quarter	1	2	3	4	Total
Texas A&M	0	7	0	6	13
Ohio State	21	7	21	7	56

at Ohio Stadium, Columbus, Ohio

- Date: September 26
- Game time: 1:30 p.m.
- Game weather: Cloudy, 80 °F (27 °C)
- Game attendance: 85,657

Game information

First quarter

- OSU – Rex Kern 6-yard run (Frank Schram kick), 11:45. Ohio State 7–0. Drive:
- OSU – John Brockington 2-yard run (Frank Schram kick), 7:27. Ohio State 14–0. Drive:
- OSU – Leo Hayden 3-yard run (Frank Schram kick), 3:13. Ohio State 21–0. Drive:

Second quarter

- A&M – Homer May 29-yard pass from Lex James (Pat McDermott kick), Ohio State 21–7. Drive:
- OSU – John Brockington 1-yard run (Frank Schram kick), 0:16. Ohio State 28–7. Drive:

Third quarter

- OSU – Jan White 5-yard pass from Ron Maciejowski (Frank Schram kick), 6:10. Ohio State 35–7. Drive:
- OSU – Larry Zelina 11-yard run (Frank Schram kick), 5:23. Ohio State 42–7. Drive:
- OSU – James Coburn 7-yard run (Frank Schram kick), 2:47. Ohio State 49–7. Drive:

Fourth quarter

- OSU – Ron Maciejowski 1-yard run (Frank Schram kick), 13:15. Ohio State 56–7. Drive:
- A&M – Homer May 22-yard pass from Lex James (kick failed), 5:17. Ohio State 56–13. Drive:

Top passers

- A&M – Lex James – 18/30, 271 yards, 2 TD, INT
- OSU – Rex Kern – 4/6, 71 yards

Top rushers

- A&M – Steve Burks – 7 rushes, 28 yards
- OSU – Leo Hayden – 14 rushes, 89 yards, TD

Top receivers

- A&M – Hugh McElroy – 4 receptions, 71 yards
- OSU – Leo Hayden – 3 receptions, 37 yards

Top-ranked Ohio State rolled up 513 yards of offense and scored touchdowns off five Texas A&M turnovers in a 56–13 rout. Fullback John Brockington scored twice and six other players accounted for touchdowns. The Buckeyes' defense forced three fumbles and an interception which led to four scores in an eight-minute span in the third quarter even though head coach Woody Hayes pulled the starters a little after halftime.

This was the first of nine consecutive losses for the Aggies, who were riding high into Columbus following a shocking 20-18 victory at LSU seven days earlier.

=== Duke ===
Team	1	2	3	4	Total
Duke	3	0	0	7	10
• Ohio St	0	6	21	7	34

- Date: October 3
- Location: Ohio Stadium, Columbus, OH
- Game start: 1:30 p.m.
- Elapsed time: 2:27
- Game attendance: 86,123
- Game weather: Sunny; 63 °F (17 °C); wind 18 to 30 mph (29 to 48 km/h) W–NW

Scoring summary
Q1	2:04	DUKE	Pugh 38-yard field goal	DUKE 3–0
Q2	:13	OHST	Luttner 45-yard blocked punt return (kick blocked)	OHST 6–3
Q3	10:52	OHST	Zelina 11-yard pass from Kern (Schram kick)	OHST 13–3
Q3	4:24	OHST	Kern 3-yard run (Schram kick)	OHST 20–3
Q3	1:27	OHST	Brockington 3-yard run (Schram kick)	OHST 27–3
Q4	5:51	OHST	Galbos 3-yard run (Schram kick)	OHST 34–3
Q4	1:23	DUKE	Jones 2-yard run (Pugh kick)	OHST 34–10

=== Michigan State ===
Team	1	2	3	4	Total
• Ohio St	9	0	7	13	29
Michigan St	0	0	0	0	0

- Date: October 10
- Location: Spartan Stadium, East Lansing, MI
- Game start: 1:30 p.m.
- Elapsed time: 2:33
- Game attendance: 75,511
- Game weather: Partly sunny; 50 °F (10 °C); wind 15 mph (24 km/h) SSW
- Referee: Howard Wirtz

Scoring summary
Q1	8:17	OHST	Brockington 2-yard run (kick failed)	OHST 6–0
Q1	1:36	OHST	Schram 33-yard field goal	OHST 9–0
Q3	5:15	OHST	Maciejowski 2-yard run (Schram kick)	OHST 16–0
Q4	7:46	OHST	Maciejowski 1-yard run (Schram kick)	OHST 23–0
Q4	4:39	OHST	Brockington 25-yard run (kick failed)	OHST 29–0

=== Minnesota ===
Team	1	2	3	4	Total
Minnesota	0	0	0	8	8
• Ohio St	21	7	0	0	28

- Date: October 17
- Location: Ohio Stadium, Columbus, OH
- Game start: 1:30 p.m.
- Elapsed time: 2:30
- Game attendance: 86,667
- Game weather: Sunny; 52 °F (11 °C); wind 12 mph (19 km/h) W

Scoring summary
Q1	11:14	OHST	Kern 7-yard run (Schram kick)	OHST 7–0
Q1	5:00	OHST	Brockington 1-yard run (Schram kick)	OHST 14–0
Q1	1:57	OHST	Brockington 62-yard run (Schram kick)	OHST 21–0
Q2	8:40	OHST	Kern 10-yard run (Schram kick)	OHST 28–0
Q4	6:09	MINN	Hamm 12-yard pass from Curry (Cook pass from Curry)	OHST 28–8

=== Illinois ===
Team	1	2	3	4	Total
• Ohio St	7	7	13	21	48
Illinois	7	13	3	6	29

- Date: October 24
- Location: Memorial Stadium, Champaign, IL
- Game start: 1:30 p.m.
- Elapsed time: 2:39
- Game attendance: 46,208
- Game weather: 60 °F (16 °C); wind 4 to 10 mph (6.4 to 16.1 km/h) SE
- Referee: Dwight Wilkey

Scoring summary
Q1	10:12	OHST	Brockington 2-yard run (Schram kick)	OHST 7–0
Q1	4:17	ILL	Lewis 18-yard run (Wells kick)	Tie 7–7
Q2	12:10	ILL	Dieken 11-yard pass from Wells (Wells kick)	ILL 14–7
Q2	11:53	OHST	Kern 76-yard run (Schram kick)	Tie 14–14
Q2	2:34	ILL	Robinson 1-yard run (kick failed)	ILL 20–14
Q3	11:48	OHST	White 43-yard pass from Kern (Schram kick)	OHST 21–20
Q3	6:27	ILL	Wells 30-yard field goal	ILL 23–21
Q3	3:59	OHST	Brockington 5-yard run (kick failed)	OHST 27–23
Q4	14:56	OHST	Brockington 11-yard run (Schram kick)	OHST 34–23
Q4	9:30	OHST	Hayden 31-yard run (Schram kick)	OHST 41–23
Q4	4:19	OHST	Coburn 1-yard run (Schram kick)	OHST 48–23
Q4	:37	ILL	Dieken 4-yard pass from Wells (pass failed)	OHST 48–29

=== Northwestern ===
Team	1	2	3	4	Total
Northwestern	7	3	0	0	10
• Ohio St	0	3	14	7	24

- Date: October 31
- Location: Ohio Stadium, Columbus, OH
- Game start: 1:30 p.m.
- Elapsed time: 2:31
- Game attendance: 86,673
- Game weather: Sunny; 60 °F (16 °C); wind 10 mph (16 km/h) SW

Scoring summary
Q1	2:58	NW	Adamle 1-yard run (Planisek kick)	NW 7–0
Q2	12:13	OHST	Schram 32-yard field goal	NW 7–3
Q2	1:22	NW	Planisek 29-yard field goal	NW 10–3
Q3	11:27	OHST	Kern 6-yard run (Schram kick)	Tie 10–10
Q3	4:01	OHST	Brockington 8-yard run (Schram kick)	OHST 17–10
Q4	4:14	OHST	Kern 3-yard run (Schram kick)	OHST 24–10

=== Wisconsin ===
Team	1	2	3	4	Total
• Ohio St	3	7	14	0	24
Wisconsin	0	7	0	0	7

- Date: November 7
- Location: Camp Randall Stadium, Madison, WI
- Game start: 1:00 p.m.
- Elapsed time: 2:33
- Game attendance: 72,758
- Game weather: Sunny; 45 °F (7 °C); wind 5 to 10 mph (8.0 to 16.1 km/h) W
- Referee: Dwight Wilkey

Scoring summary
Q1	3:00	OHST	Schram 23-yard field goal	OHST 3–0
Q2	14:27	OHST	Brockington 11-yard run (Schram kick)	OHST 10–0
Q2	1:17	WIS	Mialik 15-yard pass from Graff (Jaeger kick)	OHST 10–7
Q3	8:31	OHST	Brockington 4-yard run (Schram kick)	OHST 17–7
Q3	5:58	OHST	Brockington 1-yard run (Schram kick)	OHST 24–7

=== Purdue ===
Ohio State Buckeyes (7–0) at Purdue Boilermakers

Quarter	1	2	3	4	Total
Ohio St	7	0	0	3	10
Purdue	7	0	0	0	7

at Ross–Ade Stadium, West Lafayette, Indiana

- Date: November 14, 1970
- Game time: 1:00 p.m.
- Game weather: Overcast, 37 °F (3 °C)
- Game attendance: 68,157
- TV announcers (ABC): Chris Schenkel, Bud Wilkinson

Game information

First quarter

- OSU – John Brockington 26-yard run (Fred Schram kick), 2:13. Ohio St 7–0. Drive: 6 plays, 71 yards.
- PUR – Stan Brown 96-yard kickoff return (Jeff Jones kick), 2:01. Tie 7–7.

Fourth quarter

- OSU – Fred Schram 30-yard field goal, 2:04. Ohio St 10–7. Drive: 7 plays, 66 yards.

Top passers

- OSU – Ron Maciejowski – 1/3, 52 yards
- PUR – Gary Danielson – 2/12, 17 yards, 2 INT

Top rushers

- OSU – John Brockington – 24 rushes, 136 yards, TD
- PUR – Otis Armstrong – 20 rushes, 94 yards

Top receivers

- OSU – Bruce Jankowski – 1 reception, 52 yards
- PUR – Stan Brown – 1 reception, 9 yards

Woody Hayes received a congratulatory phone call from President Richard Nixon after the game and then asked to speak to Fred Schram, who made the game-winning field goal. John Brockington carried the ball for 136 yards and Leo Hayden added 64 yards on 16 carries.

=== Michigan ===
Michigan Wolverines at Ohio State Buckeyes (8–0)

Quarter	1	2	3	4	Total
Michigan	0	3	6	0	9
Ohio St	3	7	0	10	20

at Ohio Stadium, Columbus, Ohio

- Date: November 21, 1970
- Game weather: 44 °F (7 °C)
- Game attendance: 87,331
- Referee: Ross Dean (Big Ten)
- TV announcers (ABC): Bill Flemming and Forest Evashevski

Game information

First quarter

- OSU – Fred Schram 28-yard field goal, 12:18. Ohio St 3–0. Drive: 6 plays, 15 yards.

Second quarter

- MICH – Dana Coin 31-yard field goal, 14:57. Tie 3–3. Drive: 4 plays, 3 yards.
- OSU – Bruce Jankowski 26-yard pass from Rex Kern (Fred Schram kick), 1:18. Ohio St 10–3. Drive: 11 plays, 47 yards.

Third quarter

- MICH – Paul Staroba 13-yard pass from Don Moorhead (kick blocked), 8:30. Ohio St 10–9. Drive: 12 plays, 52 yards.

Fourth quarter

- OSU – Fred Schram 27-yard field goal, 10:49. Ohio St 13–9. Drive: 15 plays, 64 yards.
- OSU – Leo Hayden 4-yard run (Fred Schram kick), 8:14. Ohio St 20–9. Drive: 3 plays, 9 yards.

Top passers

- MICH – Don Moorhead – 12/26, 118 yards, TD, INT
- OSU – Rex Kern – 8/10, 87 yards, TD, INT

Top rushers

- MICH – Billy Taylor – 15 rushes, 31 yards
- OSU – Leo Hayden – 28 rushes, 117 yards, TD

Top receivers

- MICH – Paul Staroba – 6 receptions, 56 yards, TD
- OSU – Bruce Jankowski – 2 receptions, 37 yards, TD

Ohio State clinched a Big Ten title, a Rose Bowl berth and some measure of revenge for the 1969 upset.

=== Stanford ===
Team	1	2	3	4	Total
Ohio State	7	7	3	0	17
• Stanford	10	0	3	14	27

- Date: January 1, 1971
- Location: Rose Bowl, Pasadena, CA
- Game start: 2:05p.m. PST
- Elapsed time: 2:59
- Game attendance: 103,839
- Game weather: Clear, 70 °F (21 °C)
- TV announcers (NBC): Curt Gowdy, Kyle Rote

Scoring summary
Q1	10:20	STAN	Brown 4 yard run (Horowitz kick)	STAN 7–0
Q1	6:50	STAN	Horowitz 37 yard field goal	STAN 10–0
Q1	3:45	OSU	Brockington 1 yard run (Schram kick)	STAN 10–7
Q2	14:24	OSU	Brockington 1 yard run (Schram kick)	OSU 10–14
Q3	12:29	STAN	Horowitz 48 yard field goal	OSU 13–14
Q3	8:33	OSU	Schram 32 yard field goal	OSU 13–17
Q4	10:03	STAN	Brown 1 yard run (Horowitz kick)	STAN 20–14
Q4	8:18	STAN	Plunkett 10 yard pass to Vataha (Horowitz kick)	STAN 27–14

== New Year's Day ==
In the Cotton Bowl in Dallas, top-ranked and defending national champion Texas was upset 24–11 by #6 Notre Dame, ending the Longhorns' 30-game winning streak.

Heavily favored Ohio State could claim their second outright national title in three years that afternoon with a Rose Bowl victory over Stanford in Pasadena. Stanford (8–3) was led by quarterback Jim Plunkett, the 1970 Heisman Trophy winner. The Indians had climbed to a 6–0 conference record and 8–1 overall, but lost their final two regular season games, to Sugar Bowl-bound Air Force and arch-rival California. Stanford lost earlier in the season at home to Purdue, a team OSU defeated on the road.

The Buckeyes led Stanford by four points after three quarters, but were outscored 14–0 in the fourth quarter and lost 27–17. Later that night, #3 Nebraska won the Orange Bowl 17–12 over #5 LSU in Miami to claim the top spot in the AP writers poll.

== Personnel ==
=== Roster ===
1970 Ohio State Buckeyes football team roster
Players
Coaches
Offense

Pos.	#	Name	Class
RB	34	John Bledsoe
OL	58	Chuck Bonica
HB	42	John Brockington	Sr
WR	24	Tom Campana
OL	75	Dave Cheney
RB	47	James Coburn
OL	52	Tom DeLeone
OL	53	Brian Donovan
QB	33	Richard Galbos
TE	58	Jimmie Harris
HB	22	Leo Hayden	Sr
OL	65	John Hicks
WR	82	Bruce Jankowski	Sr
QB	10	Rex Kern (C)	Sr
DL	57	Dick Kuhn
QB	18	Ron Maciejowski
QB		Ross Moore
OL	62	Phil Strickland
TE	80	Jan White (C)	Sr
WR	16	Larry Zelina

Defense

Pos.	#	Name	Class
LB	63	Doug Adams (C)	Sr
CB	26	Tim Anderson	Sr
DL	83	Tom Debevc
DL	70	George Hasenohrl
DL	67	Ralph Holloway
CB	28	Harry Howard
DL	87	Ken Luttner
S	3	Mike Sensibaugh	Sr
DB	14	Bruce Smith
MG	68	Jim Stillwagon (C)	Sr
S	32	Jack Tatum	Sr
LB	88	Stan White
DL	79	Shad Williams

Special teams

Pos.	#	Name	Class
K	1	Fred Schram

Head coach

- Woody Hayes (20th year)

Coordinators/assistant coaches

- Earle Bruce
- George Chaump
- Rudy Hubbard (RB)
- Dave McClain
- Lou McCullough (DC)
- John Mummey (QB)
- Ralph Staub
- Dick Walker (DB)

Legend

- (C) Team captain
- (S) Suspended
- (I) Ineligible
- Injured
- Redshirt

=== Depth chart ===
Defense

FS
3 Mike Sensibaugh
⋅

WLB	SLB
88 Stan White	63 Doug Adams
⋅	⋅

SS
32 Jack Tatum
⋅

CB
26 Tim Anderson
⋅

DE	DT	NT	DT	DE
87 Ken Luttner	79 Shad Williams	68 Jim Stillwagon	70 George Hasenohrl	83 Mark Debevc
⋅	67 Ralph Holloway	⋅	⋅	⋅

CB
28 Mike Vladich
⋅

Offense

SE
82 Bruce Jankowski
⋅

LT	LG	C	RG	RT
75 Dave Cheney	57 Dick Kuhn	52 Tom DeLeone	62 Phil Strickland	65 John Hicks
⋅	53 Brian Donovan	⋅	⋅	⋅

TE
80 Jan White
⋅

WB
16 Larry Zelina
24 Tom Campana

QB
10 Rex Kern
18 Ron Maciejowski

FB
42 John Brockington
⋅

Special teams
PK 1 Fred Schram

RB
22 Leo Hayden
33 Rick Galbos

== 1971 NFL draftees ==
Player	Round	Pick	Position	NFL club
John Brockington	1	9	Running Back	Green Bay Packers
Jack Tatum	1	19	Defensive Back	Oakland Raiders
William Anderson	1	23	Defensive Back	San Francisco 49ers
Leo Hayden	1	24	Running Back	Minnesota Vikings
Jan White	2	29	Tight End	Buffalo Bills
Jim Stillwagon	5	124	Linebacker	Green Bay Packers
Doug Adams	7	165	Linebacker	Denver Broncos
Mike Sensibaugh	8	191	Defensive Back	Kansas City Chiefs
Larry Zelina	8	196	Running Back	Cleveland Browns
Bruce Jankowski	10	250	Wide Receiver	Kansas City Chiefs
Rex Kern	10	260	Defensive Back	Baltimore Colts
Ron Maciejowski	15	376	Quarterback	Chicago Bears
Mark Debevc	16	405	Linebacker	Cincinnati Bengals
