= Dick Larkins =

American coach and athletics administrator

Richard C. Larkins (April 19, 1909 – April 5, 1977) was the athletic director at the Ohio State University from July, 1946 to 1970.

== College Years ==
Larkins played on the varsity football team and varsity basketball team in his time at OSU. Larkins received a bachelor's degree in business administration 1931, then later in 1935, a master's degree in commerce. He was a member of both Beta Gamma Sigma and Phi Delta Theta. In his senior year, he was awarded with the Western Conference Medal for scholastic achievement.

== Career ==
In one of his first acts as Ohio State athletic director, Larkins hired his old teammate, Wes Fesler, to take over as Ohio State's football coach. Larkins also became involved in a public feud with legendary coach Paul Brown in 1948. A story in the Minneapolis Times quoted Larkins as saying: "Brown has started a terrific drive in Columbus and all around Ohio to return as football coach at Ohio State. Brown is not happy in the pro atmosphere. He has a good bank account and wants to coach college kids again." Larkins was also quoted as saying that Brown has been "stealing football players off our campus by the dozen" and that Brown had "done everything in his power to hurt Ohio State." Brown accused Larkins of conducting a smear campaign, and Larkins claimed he had been mis-quoted.

He is also remembered as the Ohio State athletic director who made the decision to proceed with the historic Snow Bowl game against Michigan in 1950. Despite extraordinarily inclement weather, Larkins decided to play the game "due to the number of people who attended, and the mess it would have created to refund the tickets." Ohio State lost the game 9-3.

Larkins drew national media attention for his comments in 1951 criticizing big-time college football as a Frankenstein monster. In the remarks, Larkins said:

"Football is being ruined. It's getting completely out of hand. It's a Frankenstein, a monster. Football is killing itself. ... College football is too big for its breeches. ... These 80,000-90,000 Roman holidays are not good for college athletics. They're killing it. You'll never know the pressures on us in this coaching situation. The outside pressures, the outside interference! It's just terrific. I don't know how much longer educators can put up with this stuff. We're educational institutions, we're not the New York Yankees or Chicago Bears."

However, Larkins is best remembered as the driving force behind the 1951 hiring of Woody Hayes as Ohio State's football coach. Ironically, Larkins' decision to hire the little-known Hayes, over former Buckeyes' coach Paul Brown, led to petitions being circulated on campus calling for Larkins' removal; the petition claimed that Larkins "has lost confidence of the Ohio State student body" over his opposition to Brown's return as football coach. Larkins became Hayes' strongest supporter at the university and protected Hayes after numerous clashes and against efforts by university administrators to fire him. Larkins and Hayes became close friends; in 1979, Hayes recalled: "My greatest friends are always people that I fight with. Bo [Schembechler] was one of those. .... That was true with Dick Larkins (former athletic director at Ohio State). We were always arguing but agreed on everything."

Larkins also hired Marty Karow to coach the Ohio State baseball team and Fred Taylor to coach the basketball team. Taylor led his basketball team to the NCAA championship in 1960 and Karow did the same with the baseball team in 1966. Those remain the university's only national titles in those sports.

In 1970, Larkins became the fourth recipient of the James J. Corbett Memorial Award, presented by the National Association of Collegiate Directors of Athletics "to the collegiate administrator who through the years has most typified Corbett's devotion to intercollegiate athletics and worked unceasingly for its betterment."

== Legacy ==
Larkins Hall on the Ohio State Campus was named for Dick Larkins. The building served as the recreation and physical activity center for a number of years. It was torn down in the early-2000s to build the new Recreation and Physical Activity Center (RPAC). The Richard C. Larkins Plaza was named after the completion of the RPAC. The Plaza is located at the conjunction of the four physical education buildings on campus.

== Head coaching record ==
Year	Team	Overall	Conference	Standing	Bowl/playoffs
Rochester Yellowjackets (Independent) (1935–1936)
1935	Rochester	1–6			
1936	Rochester	2–5			
Rochester:		3–11			
Total:		3–11			
