= Tim Anderson (defensive back) =

American gridiron football player (born 1949)

No. 26
- Position: Defensive back

Personal information
- Born: August 1, 1949 (age 77); Colliers, West Virginia, U.S.

Career information
- College: Ohio State
- NFL draft: 1971: 1st round, 23rd overall pick

Career history
- Toronto Argonauts (1971–1974); San Francisco 49ers (1975); Buffalo Bills (1976); Detroit Lions (1977)*
- * Offseason or practice squad member only

Awards and highlights
- CFL East All-Star (1973); 2× National champion (1968, 1970); Second-team All-American (1970); 2× Second-team All-Big Ten (1969, 1970)

Career NFL statistics
- Games played: 15
- Stats at Pro Football Reference

William Tim Anderson (born August 1, 1949) is an American former professional football player who was a defensive back in the National Football League (NFL) and Canadian Football League (CFL). He played for the Toronto Argonauts, San Francisco 49ers and Buffalo Bills. He played college football for the Ohio State Buckeyes.

After being drafted by the 49ers in the first round of the 1971 NFL draft, Anderson was so unhappy with the 49ers' contract offer that he considered quitting football and signed with the Argonauts instead. Anderson said that "The negotiations with the 49ers go off on the wrong foot and got progressively worse." He believed that he was the first NFL first round draft pick to sign with the CFL instead (but he was not as that was Johnny Bright who was selected 5th in 1952, and many other players followed), and was followed by Heisman Trophy winner Johnny Rodgers in 1973 in taking that route. He earned all-CFL honors while with the Argonauts in 1973. He signed with the 49ers before the 1975 season and said that the contract was "for a lot better money than they offered [in 1971], but it's not a no-cut contract."

After serving as a backup safety for most of the 1975 season, Anderson and Mike Holmes were traded to the Bills in exchange for 2 draft picks before the 1976 season. After playing the first two games for the Bills in September 1976, he was placed on injured reserve with a bruised thigh and the Bills then waived him in October. The Detroit Lions signed Anderson before the 1977 season but waived him during preseason.
