= Leo Hayden =

American football player (born 1948)

No. 44, 32
- Position: Running back

Personal information
- Born: June 2, 1948 (age 78); Louisville, Kentucky, U.S.
- Listed height: 6 ft 0 in (1.83 m)
- Listed weight: 210 lb (95 kg)

Career information
- High school: Roosevelt (Dayton, Ohio)
- College: Ohio State
- NFL draft: 1971: 1st round, 24th overall pick

Career history
- Minnesota Vikings (1971); St. Louis Cardinals (1972–1973); Chicago Fire (1974)*
- * Offseason or practice squad member only

Awards and highlights
- 2× National champion (1968, 1970); Second-team All-Big Ten (1970)

Career NFL statistics
- Rushing attempts: 8
- Rushing yards: 11
- Rushing touchdowns: 1
- Receptions: 1
- Receiving yards: 17
- Receiving touchdowns: 0
- Stats at Pro Football Reference

Leophus Hayden Sr. (born June 2, 1948) is an American former professional football player who was a running back in the National Football League (NFL) from 1971 to 1973. He played college football for the Ohio State Buckeyes and was selected by the Minnesota Vikings in the first round of the 1971 NFL draft. He played in the NFL for the Vikings and St. Louis Cardinals

As a rookie with the Vikings in 1971 Hayden played almost exclusively on special teams and did not have a single rushing attempt. Hayden later acknowledged that his play was impacted by drug use, and he was cut by the Vikings after one season. Hayden later said "I knew there were still people on the team I was better than, but I look back on those years of addiction that, because you’re a junkie, there’s no more vile person in the world than a junkie. The reason they call it dope is because it turns you into one.” He signed with the Cardinals, and spent the 1972 and 1973 seasons with them, but his drug use got worse and he played little and was released after the 1973 season. Hayden signed with the Chicago Fire of the World Football League in March 1974. But during the Fire's training camp in June he was arrested on a bad check warrant.

After his football career ended, Hayden founded the "National Center for Violence Interruption," a program designed to prevent urban violence. As of 2021, Hayden was director of the inmates re-entry program for New Orleans Parish Louisiana.
