= Rex Kern =

American football player (born 1949)

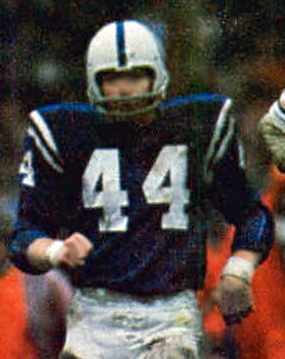
- Kern in 1971, with the Colts

No. 44, 45
- Positions: Defensive back (NFL); Quarterback (college)

Personal information
- Born: May 28, 1949 (age 77); Lancaster, Ohio, U.S.
- Listed height: 5 ft 11 in (1.80 m)
- Listed weight: 190 lb (86 kg)

Career information
- High school: Lancaster (OH)
- College: Ohio State
- NFL draft: 1971: 10th round, 260th overall pick

Career history
- Baltimore Colts (1971–1973); Buffalo Bills (1974)

Awards and highlights
- 2× National champion (1968, 1970); First-team All-American (1969); 3× Second-team All-Big Ten (1968, 1969, 1970)
- Stats at Pro Football Reference
- College Football Hall of Fame

Rex William Kern (born May 28, 1949) is an American former professional football player. He played professional football in the National Football League (NFL) at defensive back for the Baltimore Colts and Buffalo Bills. In college, Kern was the quarterback for the Ohio State Buckeyes from 1968 to 1970; the Buckeyes went undefeated in 1968 and were national champions. Kern was inducted into the College Football Hall of Fame in 2007.

== Early life ==
Kern was born on May 28, 1949, in Lancaster, Ohio, where he was raised by his mother Jean, a former high school athlete, and father Trenton Kern, a barber. Kern was a star three-sport athlete for Lancaster High School and graduated in 1967. His favorite high school sports season was with his 1966 basketball team. In baseball, he was selected in the 16th round of the 1967 baseball draft (306th overall) by the Kansas City Athletics, and was offered basketball scholarships to UCLA, North Carolina, and Ohio University. However Kern had long sought to play basketball for Fred Taylor of Ohio State and had fostered a relationship with Taylor that led to a scholarship offer.

During the recruiting process, he was also recruited by Ohio State football coach Woody Hayes and committed to Ohio State to play both sports. Hayes and Taylor agreed Kern could play both sports. He was drafted by the A's after agreeing to attend Ohio State, and Trenton Kern reminded his son that Kern had already given his word to play for Hayes and Taylor.

== College career ==
At Ohio State, Kern quarterbacked the freshman team in 1967, which included 11 high school All-Americans, but suffered a back injury playing freshman basketball. Despite back surgery in June, Kern recovered in time to be named first-string quarterback for the varsity football team ahead of senior Bill Long, who had quarterbacked the Buckeyes in 1967.

Kern was the leader of the Buckeyes' Super Sophomores, and guided the Buckeyes to an undefeated season and a consensus national championship in 1968. The Super Sophomores finished their three-year varsity careers with a record of 27–2. Kern was a fine passer and a dangerous runner. As a quarterback, from 1968 to 1970, he passed for 2,303 yards with a 52.1 completion percentage, 17 touchdowns and 23 interceptions. In the 1968, 1969, and 1970 seasons, it has been reported that he rushed for 499, 583, and 468 yards respectively. He rushed for 24 touchdowns in three years.

It has also been stated that he ran for 583, 524, and 597 yards respectively from 1968 to 1970—high numbers for a Big Ten quarterback.

The 1968 team shut out top-ranked Purdue on October 12 and went on to an undefeated season, a Big Ten championship, and a berth in the Rose Bowl. Kern was named Most Outstanding Player in the Rose Bowl as No. 1 ranked Ohio State defeated O. J. Simpson and the No. 2 ranked USC Trojans, 27–16, and were consensus national champions.

In 1969, the Buckeyes were expected to repeat as national champions. Kern directed a high-scoring (averaging 46 points per game) junior-dominated Buckeye offense that cruised through its first eight games. But Kern and the 8–0 Buckeyes were devastated by an upset 24–12 loss at Michigan on the last day of the season, a game in which Kern threw four interceptions and was replaced.

Despite the loss, Ohio State finished as Big Ten co-champions with Michigan and Kern was third in balloting for the 1969 Heisman Trophy. He was also named a first-team All-American. Kern was named an All-American as a running back, because there were so many great college quarterbacks that year. Ohio State did not play in a bowl game, because prior to the 1975 season, the Big Ten and Pac-8 conferences allowed just one bowl team each, to the Rose Bowl.

The super sophomores rebounded as seniors in 1970 to win the Big Ten title outright, gaining revenge against Michigan with a 20–9 victory one year later. The Buckeyes finished the regular season undefeated at 9–0, earning another trip to Pasadena to play in the Rose Bowl. However, the No. 2 ranked Buckeyes were upset by the #12 Stanford Indians, 27–17, led by quarterback Jim Plunkett, the Heisman Trophy winner. Kern, elected team captain in 1970, finished fifth on the 1970 Heisman ballot.

Kern was elected to the Ohio State Varsity O Hall of Fame in 1978, was selected to the Ohio State Football All-Century Team in 2000, and the College Football Hall of Fame in 2007. In 1991, Kern was named a member of the Rose Bowl Hall of Fame.

Kern co-wrote a book, with Lee Caryer, about his early life in Ohio and Ohio State experience, The Road to the Horseshoe and Beyond: How a Small-Town Athlete Benefited from Ohio State to Build a Life.

== Professional career ==
Kern was selected in the tenth round of the 1971 NFL draft (260th overall) by the defending NFL champion Baltimore Colts. Kern played in all fourteen games in his rookie season, supplanting Jim Duncan as starting cornerback, and starting four games. He only made five starts in 1972 due to a recurrence of his back injury, and recovered to play a full season in 1973, starting eight games with two interceptions.

Kern was the Colts' National Football League Players Association (NFLPA) representative during the union's strike prior to the 1974 season. After the strike ended, he was waived when Baltimore general manager Joe Thomas acted on his threat to cut players who had walked out. Thomas once called Kern during the strike at 1:30 a.m., and told Kern, "'Rex, I want to tell you one thing: If there is anyone in camp who is not on strike, and whose ability is even half as good as the rest of you, I’ll cut [the strikers],’”

Kern played eight games with the Buffalo Bills that season before ending his career as an active player due to chronic back problems. He played against the Colts that year in a Bills victory; and, starting at free safety, he had 13 tackles and a fumble recovery in a playoff game against the Pittsburgh Steelers (playing with a dislocated finger).

== Personal life ==
Kern earned three degrees from Ohio State, a Baccalaureate, a Master's, and a Ph.D. in health, physical education and recreation. Kern received the National Football Foundation’s Scholar-Athlete Award, was an All-Big 10 Academic Team honoree in 1970, and received an NCAA Post-Graduate Scholarship in 1971. He credited his success to his education, and his education to Woody Hayes, with whom he had a lifelong friendship. In 2001, he created the Anne and Woody Hayes Endowment for the prevention of child abuse to Columbus Children's Hospital.

He was president of a business selling Nautilus equipment for over 40 years.
