= Jim Otis =

American football player (born 1948)

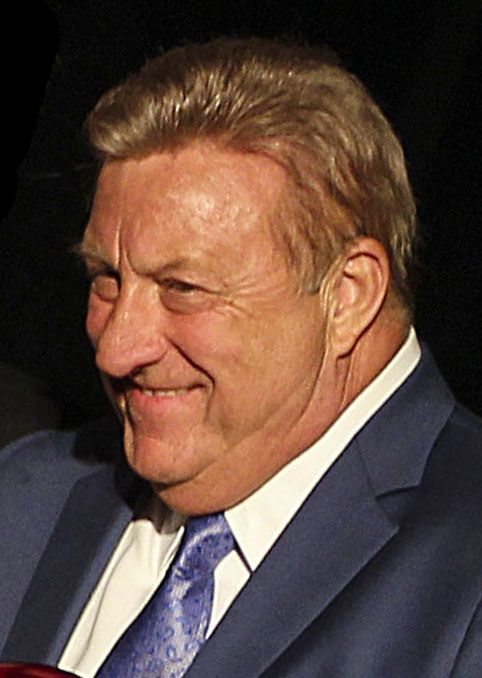

No. 35
- Position: Running back

Personal information
- Born: April 29, 1948 (age 78); Celina, Ohio, U.S.
- Listed height: 6 ft 0 in (1.83 m)
- Listed weight: 223 lb (101 kg)

Career information
- High school: Celina
- College: Ohio State
- NFL draft: 1970: 9th round, 218th overall pick

Career history
- New Orleans Saints (1970); Kansas City Chiefs (1971–1972); St. Louis Cardinals (1973–1978)

Awards and highlights
- Pro Bowl (1975); National champion (1968); Consensus All-American (1969); Second-team All-American (1968); First-team All-Big Ten (1969); Second-team All-Big Ten (1968)

Career NFL statistics
- Rushing attempts: 1,160
- Rushing yards: 4,350
- Total TDs: 22
- Stats at Pro Football Reference

James Lloyd Otis (born April 29, 1948) is an American former professional football player who was a running back in the National Football League (NFL) for nine seasons during the 1970s. Otis played college football for Ohio State University, and was recognized as a consensus All-American as a senior in 1969. He played professionally for the New Orleans Saints, Kansas City Chiefs and St. Louis Cardinals of the NFL.

Otis was the first Ohio State Buckeye to rush for over 1,000 yards in a single season. He was first-team All-Big Ten as a senior. He led the National Football Conference in rushing in 1975, and was selected to play in the Pro Bowl that season. Otis retired after the 1978 season as the Chicago/St. Louis Cardinals' all-time leader in rushing yards and rushing attempts, and he had the most rushing yards in a season and most 100-yard rushing games as a Cardinal. He led the Cardinals in rushing three times during his career.

== Early life ==
Otis was born on April 29, 1948, in Celina, Ohio. His father James Otis was a doctor, and had been future Ohio State University football head coach Woody Hayes's roommate and fraternity brother (Sigma Chi) at Denison University in the 1930s (graduating in 1935). Dr. Otis raised his son to play football from an early age, such that at only nine years old Otis had learned Ohio States' offensive plays and how they were to be used depending on the circumstances in a game. Throughout Otis's teenage years, his father took him to Ohio State's football games, and would take Otis into the locker room after games where Dr. Otis would talk with head coach Hayes. It has been reported that Dr. Otis himself did not play football after high school as he was only 5 ft 6 in (1.68 m) 125 lbs (56.7 kg).

Otis attended Celina Senior High School, and played fullback for the Celina Bulldogs high school football team for most of his career there. The Bulldogs' coach moved Otis from fullback to tackle during his junior year (1964), which disappointed Otis. When his replacement at fullback was injured during an important game, Otis asked the coach to let him play fullback again. The coach agreed, and Otis then scored all 16 of his team's points in leading them to a win; and he remained at fullback for the rest of his high school career.

In the first six games of the team's 1965 season, as a senior, Otis had 1,057 yards rushing, averaging 5.8 yards per carry with 17 touchdowns and 108 points scored. On the entire season, the team finished 9–0–1, and Otis gained 1,690 yards and scored 154 points. Between his 1964 and 1965 seasons, Otis rushed for 2,339 yards. In 1965, he was selected as an All-Ohio fullback as a senior.

== College career ==
Otis was offered numerous football scholarships, but chose to attend the Ohio State University, where Woody Hayes was the head football coach. Otis was 6 ft (1.83 m) 215 lb (97.5 kg) when he entered Ohio State. He was a fullback for the Ohio State Buckeyes football team from 1967 to 1969, playing in the Big Ten Conference. He became a starter during his sophomore season (1967), rushing for 530 yards in 141 attempts, with two rushing touchdowns; leading the Buckeyes in rushing yards that season. He had been benched for not playing well during the season, but Hayes brought Otis back as a starter against the Iowa Hawkeyes, and Otis rushed for 149 yards and one touchdown in that game.

As a junior in 1968, Otis led the Buckeyes in rushing with 884 yards, averaging 4.7 yards per carry, with a team-leading 16 rushing touchdowns. He also had 10 receptions for 82 yards. In the final Big Ten game that season, Ohio State defeated the No. 4 ranked Michigan Wolverines, 50–14, led by Otis's 142 rushing yards in 34 carries, with four rushing touchdowns; winning the Big Ten championship and a place in the Rose Bowl. In the Rose Bowl that season, Ohio State defeated the University of Southern California Trojans and their Heisman Trophy winner O. J. Simpson, 27–16. Otis led Ohio State in rushing with 101 yards on 30 carries, and scored Ohio State's first touchdown that day. Ohio State finished the season 10–0 and was ranked No.1 by the Associated Press (AP) and United Press International (UPI), among others.

In 1969, as a senior, Otis led the Buckeyes in rushing for a third consecutive season. He ran for 1,027 yards, averaging 4.6 yards per carry, with 15 rushing touchdowns. He also had one receiving touchdown. Otis led the Big Ten Conference in rushing touchdowns and total touchdowns, and was second in rushing yards. Ohio State finished the season ranked fourth nationally by the AP. As a senior in 1969, he was a consensus first-team All-American (including being named an AP first-team All-American), and was seventh in the vote for the Heisman Trophy. The AP named him first-team All-Big Ten. Ohio State tied Michigan as Big Ten champions, and finished the 1969 football season ranked No. 4 by the AP.

In three years with Ohio State, he rushed for 2,441 yards, with 33 rushing touchdowns in 26 games played. He averaged 4.4 yards per carry and 93.9 rushing yards per game.

== Professional career ==
=== New Orleans Saints and Kansas City Chiefs ===
The New Orleans Saints selected Otis in the ninth round of the 1970 NFL draft, 218th overall. Hall of Fame fullback Jim Taylor had scouted Otis for the Saints. Otis was disappointed at not being drafted until the ninth round, as he thought he would be taken much earlier in the draft; but said at the time he would prove himself to those who doubted him, just as he had done in the past. Saints' coach Tom Fears was pleased with the team's selecting Otis, as Fears also believed Otis should have been taken much higher in the draft. One reason given for his low draft position was that some scouts considered him too slow. Even though he was injured on the first day in training camp, Otis made the Saints' roster and started six games for the Saints in 1970, with 211 rushing yards in 71 attempts. He also had 20 receptions for 124 yards.

In January 1971, the Saints traded Otis to the Kansas City Chiefs for a seventh round draft choice. In 1971 and 1972 with the Chiefs, Otis appeared in 23 games without starting any games; playing behind Wendell Hayes. He totaled 276 yards in 78 rushing attempts and 157 receiving yards on 25 receptions, with two receiving touchdowns. The Chiefs waived Otis in September 1973, before the season started.

=== St. Louis Cardinals ===
In September 1973, the St. Louis Cardinals acquired Otis for the $100 waiver fee after the Chiefs had waived him. Otis was being little used by the Cardinals in 1973, and approached Cardinals’ offensive line coach Jim Hanifan during the season, showing Hanifan some off-tackle running plays Otis had designed for himself. Otis believed these plays would work for him in games, and help the Cardinals, if he were allowed to play more. Hanifan, in his first year with the Cardinals, agreed and Otis got more playing time. Otis started two of the 10 games in which he appeared that year, with 234 yards on 55 carries and one rushing touchdown.

In 1974, Otis became a full-time starting fullback in the NFL with the Cardinals, playing in the backfield alongside halfback Terry Metcalf. Otis started 12 games, rushing for 664 yards in 158 carries, with 19 receptions for 109 yards. Otis believed this was the first season he was given a fair opportunity to become a starting fullback in the NFL. He described himself as a "Sherman tank" running to the inside, compared to Metcalf's being a "Corvette", with great speed as a runner. The Cardinals finished the season 10–4, first in the National Football Conference's (NFC) East Division under head coach Don Coryell. They lost in the divisional round of the playoffs to the Minnesota Vikings, Otis having 35 yards on eight carries.

Otis's best season came in 1975. He was fourth in the NFL in total rushing yards (1,076) and rushing attempts (269), and first in the National Football Conference in rushing yards. Otis had a 30-yard run that season, the longest of his career. He had the first 100-yard rushing game of his career on October 5 against the New York Giants (101 yards on 20 carries). Otis was selected to play in the Pro Bowl for the only time in his career. The Cardinals were 11–3 and again first in the NFC East Division in 1975. They lost in the divisional round of the playoffs to the Los Angeles Rams, 35–23. Otis had 38 rushing yards, 52 receiving yards, a rushing touchdown and a fumble in that game.

Otis finished the 1975 season six yards ahead of Minnesota Vikings' running back Chuck Foreman for the NFC rushing title. In 1975, Foreman was the NFC's player of the year, leading the NFL in receptions (73) and the NFC in total touchdowns (22). Otis prevented Foreman from achieving the first ever NFC "triple crown" of leading the conference in receptions, rushing yards, and touchdowns.

In 1976, the Cardinals were 10–4, but did not make the playoffs. Otis, starting 11 games, rushed for 891 yards on 233 carries with two rushing touchdowns. In 1977, Coryell's final season as the Cardinals' coach, Otis started only seven games, with 334 yards on 99 carries. Otis began the season as the Cardinals' starter, but Coryell later replaced Otis with Wayne Morris as the starting fullback that year. Even after making Otis a reserve, Coryell stated "Otis will win for us before the season is over".

With six minutes left in a mid-November 1977 game against the Dallas Cowboys, tied at 17, Morris was injured and Coryell put Otis into the game for the first time that day. The Cardinals then used Otis to carry the ball on four consecutive plays, making important contributions to the Cardinals' 24–17 win that day. Otis started the following week against the Philadelphia Eagles, rushing for 97 yards on 18 carries, with two rushing touchdowns, including a 25-yard touchdown. Otis received a game ball for his performance.

1978 was Otis's final NFL season. Bud Wilkinson was now the Cardinals' head coach. Otis started nine of the 15 games in which he appeared, rushing for 664 yards in 197 carries, with eight rushing touchdowns. Otis announced his retirement in August 1979. Cardinals' coach Bud Wilkinson had made Otis aware that he would not be receiving much playing time in 1979, and would be phased out for younger running backs. Otis wanted to leave football after having a productive season (1978), rather than fading away as a bench player. At the time he retired, Otis held the Cardinal records for most rushing yards in a season (1,076), most career rushing yards (3,863), most career rushing attempts (1,011), and most 100-yard games in a season and career. Otis led the Cardinals in rushing in 1975, 1976, and 1978.

== Legacy and honors ==
Otis was the first Ohio State player ever to rush for 1,000 yards in a single season; and never lost yardage while rushing the ball in over 550 rushing attempts. Through 2014, Otis was third behind Archie Griffin and Ezekiel Elliot among Ohio State running backs in career rushing yards per game. He is third in Cardinals’ history in total career rushing yards (through 2025).

Otis was inducted into the Ohio State Varsity O Hall of Fame in 1996. In 2000, Otis was selected to the Ohio State Football All-Century Team. In 2011, Bleacher Report ranked him as the 18th best player all-time for Ohio State. In 2015, he was inducted into the St. Louis Sports Hall of Fame. In 2018, he was inducted into the Missouri Sports Hall of Fame.

Otis described himself as quick off the ball as a running back, but not fast. He considered a player's mental outlook and determination as important as his physical qualities. After Otis retired from the NFL, Cardinals' and College Football Hall of Fame coach Bud Wilkinson said, "I had the privilege of being associated for one season with Jim, but during the year I gained great admiration not only for his football ability and effort but also his character and courage".

== NFL career statistics ==
Legend
**Bold**	Career high

=== Regular season ===
Year	Team	Games		Rushing					Receiving				
Year	Team	GP	GS	Att	Yds	Avg	Lng	TD	Rec	Yds	Avg	Lng	TD
1970	NOR	13	6	71	211	3.0	15	0	**20**	**124**	6.2	22	0
1971	KAN	13	0	49	184	3.8	14	0	13	81	6.2	**26**	**2**
1972	KAN	10	0	29	92	3.2	12	0	12	76	6.3	13	0
1973	STL	10	2	55	234	**4.3**	19	1	2	19	**9.5**	14	0
1974	STL	14	12	158	664	4.2	23	1	19	109	5.7	13	0
1975	STL	14	**14**	**269**	**1,076**	4.0	**30**	5	12	69	5.8	12	1
1976	STL	14	11	233	891	3.8	23	2	2	15	7.5	8	0
1977	STL	13	7	99	334	3.4	25	2	2	18	9.0	9	0
1978	STL	**15**	9	197	664	3.4	17	**8**	8	38	4.8	12	0
		116	61	1,160	4,350	3.8	30	19	90	549	6.1	26	3

=== Playoffs ===
Year	Team	Games		Rushing					Receiving				
Year	Team	GP	GS	Att	Yds	Avg	Lng	TD	Rec	Yds	Avg	Lng	TD
1971	KAN	**1**	0	3	13	4.3	**12**	**1**	0	0	0.0	0	0
1974	STL	**1**	**1**	8	35	**4.4**	**12**	0	1	−1	−1.0	−1	0
1975	STL	**1**	**1**	**12**	**38**	3.2	6	**1**	**4**	**52**	**13.0**	**21**	0
		3	2	23	86	3.7	12	2	5	51	10.2	21	0

== Personal life ==
Otis's father, Dr. James John Otis, had been the roommate and best friend of Ohio State head coach Woody Hayes when both men were members of the Sigma Chi fraternity of Denison University in the 1930s. Dr. Otis lived and operated a medical practice in Celina, Ohio for decades, and into the 21st century. He and Hayes remained friends throughout their lives (until Hayes' death in 1987), but had the least contact with each other during the years that Otis played for Hayes at Ohio State. Dr. Otis and Hayes agreed to reduce their contact to avoid any appearance of impropriety. Hayes broke off all social contact with the elder Otis during the son's college career. Otis said that Hayes treated him more harshly than his Ohio State teammates to avoid any notion of Hayes showing Otis favoritism.

During his career with the Cardinals, he worked in the mortgage lending business in the off seasons. After retiring, Otis was a partner in a real estate company that developed hotels, office buildings, and shopping centers. He has served on the board of the Boys Club of St. Louis, the Kilo Foundation, the NFL Alumni National Executive Board, and as the president of the NFL Alumni Association's St. Louis Chapter.

Otis has a son, Jimmy Otis. Otis was the first person to hold Jimmy after he was born, and Woody Hayes was second. Hayes gave the newborn Jimmy a football that said "See you at Ohio State in 2000". Jimmy Otis was a star high school quarterback at Christian Brothers College High School in the St. Louis area; but was considered somewhat undersized for a college quarterback. He was invited to Ohio State in 2000 as a preferred walk-on, and lettered in 2003 for special teams play.

Otis's other son, Jeff Otis, was under contract and/or played on the practice squads of four NFL teams between January 2006 and December 2009. In 2006, he played for the Frankfurt Galaxy of the NFL Europe.

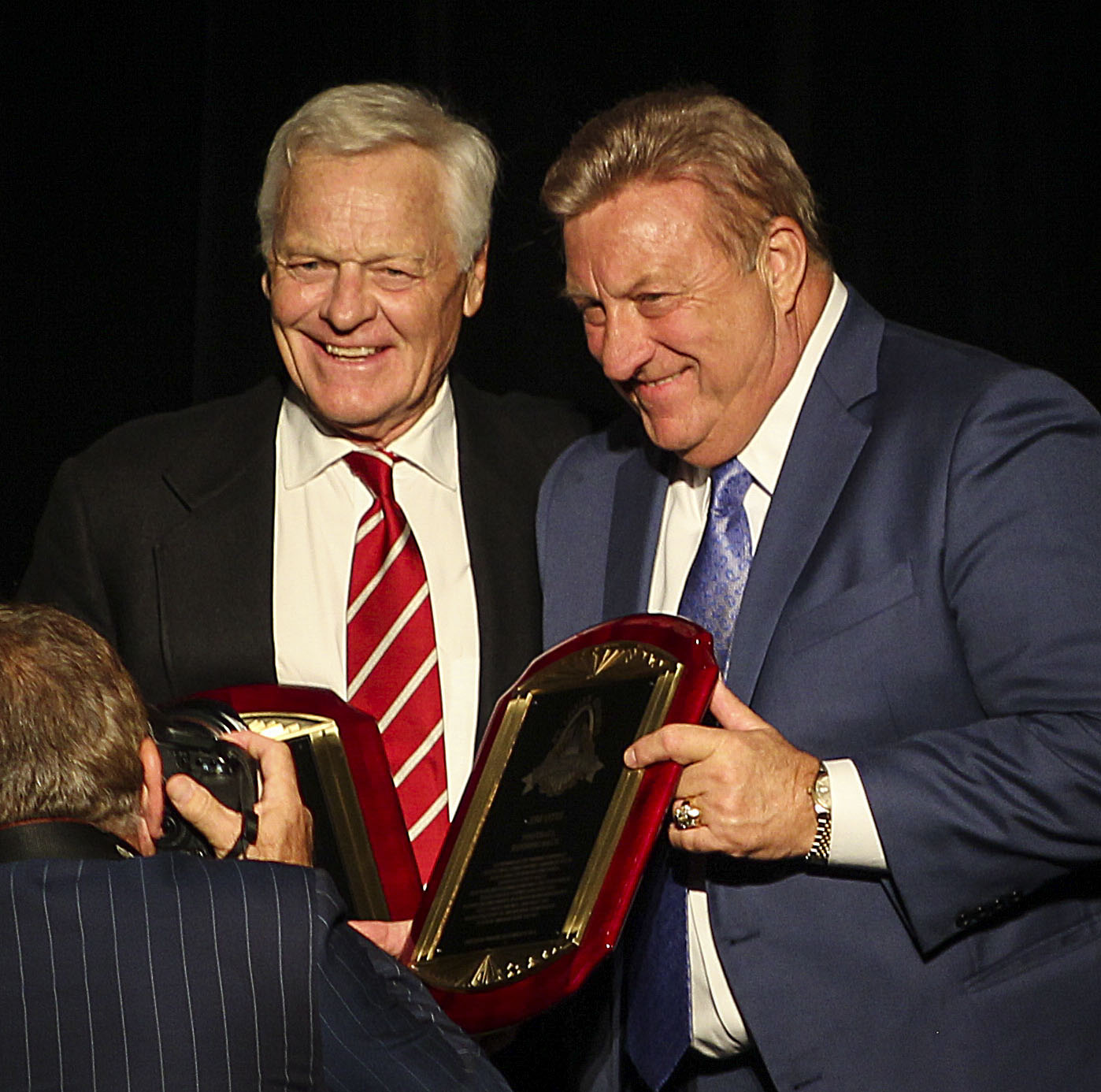
Otis inducted into the St. Louis Sports Hall of Fame, 2015. Jim Bakken presents his plaque.
