= Jim Stillwagon =

American gridiron football player (1949–2018)

No. 68
- Position: Defensive tackle

Personal information
- Born: February 11, 1949; Mt. Vernon, Ohio, U.S.
- Died: February 4, 2018 (aged 68); Columbus, Ohio, U.S.
- Listed height: 6 ft 0 in (1.83 m)
- Listed weight: 239 lb (108 kg)

Career information
- College: Ohio State
- NFL draft: 1971: 5th round, 124th overall pick

Career history
- 1971–1975: Toronto Argonauts

Awards and highlights
- 3× CFL All-Star (1971, 1972, 1974); 3× CFL East All-Star (1971, 1972, 1974); 2× National champion (1968, 1970); Outland Trophy (1970); Lombardi Award (1970); UPI Lineman of the Year (1970); Unanimous All-American (1970); Consensus All-American (1969); 2× First-team All-Big Ten (1969, 1970); Second-team All-Big Ten (1968); Ohio State Football All-Century Team
- College Football Hall of Fame

James R. Stillwagon (February 11, 1949 – February 4, 2018) was an American football player who played five years in the Canadian Football League (CFL) and was a two-time All-American during his college career.

Stillwagon was a three-year starter with the Ohio State Buckeyes. He was a consensus All-American selection as a junior and senior, and won the Outland Trophy and was the first-ever winner of the Lombardi Award. He also won the 1970 UPI Lineman of the Year. Stillwagon was one of the so-called Super Sophomores of 1968, guiding the Buckeyes to an undefeated season and a consensus national championship. Stillwagon and the other Super Sophomores finished their college careers with a record of 27–2.

Stillwagon was selected by the Green Bay Packers in the fifth round (124th pick) of the 1971 NFL draft, but turned north to Canada for a pro career. In five years in the Canadian Football League (1971–1975) with the Toronto Argonauts, Stillwagon was a three time all star. He was runner up for the CFL's Most Outstanding Defensive Player Award in 1972.

Stillwagon was honoured at the September 11, 2009 home game of the Toronto Argonauts as the newest addition to the team's list of All-Time Argos.
