= John Hicks (American football) =

American football player (1951–2016)

No. 74
- Position: Guard

Personal information
- Born: March 21, 1951; Cleveland, Ohio, U.S.
- Died: October 29, 2016 (aged 65); Columbus, Ohio, U.S.
- Listed height: 6 ft 2 in (1.88 m)
- Listed weight: 258 lb (117 kg)

Career information
- High school: John Hay (OH)
- College: Ohio State
- NFL draft: 1974: 1st round, 3rd overall pick

Career history
- New York Giants (1974–1977)

Awards and highlights
- PFWA All-Rookie Team (1974); UPI NFC Rookie of Year (1974); National champion (1970); Sporting News Player of the Year (1973); Outland Trophy (1973); UPI Lineman of the Year (1973); Lombardi Award (1973); Unanimous All-American (1973); First-team All-American (1972); 2× First-team All-Big Ten (1972, 1973)

Career NFL statistics
- Games started: 52
- Games played: 50
- Stats at Pro Football Reference
- College Football Hall of Fame

John Clarence Hicks Jr. (March 21, 1951 – October 29, 2016) was an American professional football player who was a guard in the National Football League (NFL). He is best remembered for being the last lineman to be runner-up in the vote for the Heisman Trophy.

== College career ==
In 1970, Hicks came onto the Buckeye scene and won the job as a starting tackle. He missed the last 6 games of the 1971 season due to a knee injury, and was granted a medical redshirt by the NCAA. He rebounded to put together two spectacular seasons in 1972 and 1973. During Hicks' three years, Ohio State posted a 28–3–1 record, and each year, Ohio State won the Big Ten Championship and went to the Rose Bowl, making Hicks the first person from OSU to play in three Rose Bowls.

In 1972 Hicks was recognized as a First-team All-American selection and earned his first of two All-Big Ten honors. He repeated his All-Conference honors his senior year and again earned All-America honors, this time as a unanimous selection. His stellar senior season and dominance of the line of scrimmage caught the eye of the voters as Hicks won the Lombardi Award as the nation's most outstanding lineman and the Outland Trophy as the nation's best interior lineman. He was the runner up to running back John Cappelletti of Penn State in the voting for the 1973 Heisman trophy.

=== The comeback ===
The 6-3, 258 pound tackle started as a sophomore in 1970 when freshman weren't eligible, and helped them go to the Rose Bowl. In 1971, he started off the season in dominant fashion before injuring his knee and missing the last six games of the season. After being granted a medical redshirt by the NCAA, he came back to become an All-American in 1972 helping the Buckeyes to go back to the Rose Bowl. Then he had his monster 1973 season. A first round draft pick of the New York Giants, he was named the NFC Rookie of the Year in 1974. However, injuries would put a halt to his pro career after just 4 seasons.

=== The Rose Bowls ===
Hicks was the first player to ever start in three Rose Bowls and was part of a monster Ohio State team. The unbeaten Buckeyes lost to Stanford 27–17 in the 1971 Rose Bowl. Next year at the 1973 game, Ohio State got steamrolled by USC 42–17. But the 1974 Rose Bowl game would be unbeaten Ohio State's year to steamroll USC 42–21 as Hicks led the way to 323 rushing yards.

== Professional career ==
Hicks was selected by the New York Giants in the first round with the third overall selection in the 1974 NFL draft, of which he was the only college football player invited to attend. He played with the Giants from 1974 through 1977, and in his first 3 seasons he started every regular season game for the team as a right guard. In April 1978, the Giants traded Hicks to the Pittsburgh Steelers in exchange for offensive lineman Jim Clack and wide receiver Ernie Pough. Hicks never played for the Steelers.

== Honors ==
- First-team All-American-1972, 1973
- First-team All-Big Ten-1972, 1973
- Second in Heisman Trophy voting-1973
- Outland Trophy Winner-1973
- Lombardi Trophy Winner-1973
- Rose Bowl Hall of Fame-2009

== Personal ==
Hicks was married to Cindy Hicks who was his second wife. He had three daughters and one son with his first wife.

On October 30, 2016, Hicks died at his home due to complications from diabetes. He was 65.
