= Jack Tatum =

American football player (1948–2010)

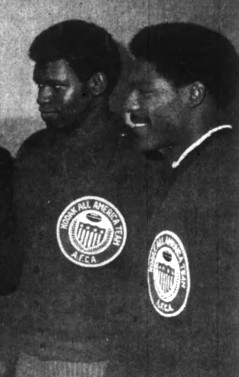
- Tatum (right) with Jimmy Gunn in 1969

No. 31, 32, 28
- Position: Safety

Personal information
- Born: November 18, 1948; Cherryville, North Carolina, U.S.
- Died: July 27, 2010 (aged 61); Oakland, California, U.S.
- Listed height: 5 ft 10 in (1.78 m)
- Listed weight: 200 lb (91 kg)

Career information
- High school: Passaic (Passaic, New Jersey)
- College: Ohio State (1968–1970)
- NFL draft: 1971: 1st round, 19th overall pick

Career history
- Oakland Raiders (1971–1979); Houston Oilers (1980)

Awards and highlights
- Super Bowl champion (XI); Second-team All-Pro (1974); 3× Pro Bowl (1973–1975); 2× National champion (1968, 1970); 2× Unanimous All-American (1969, 1970); 3× First-team All-Big Ten (1968–1970)

Career NFL statistics
- Interceptions: 37
- Interception yards: 736
- Fumble recoveries: 10
- Defensive touchdowns: 1
- Stats at Pro Football Reference
- College Football Hall of Fame

John David Tatum (November 18, 1948 – July 27, 2010) was an American professional football safety who played 10 seasons from 1971 through 1980 with the Oakland Raiders and the Houston Oilers in the National Football League (NFL). He was popularly nicknamed as "the Assassin" because of his playing style. Tatum was voted to three consecutive Pro Bowls (1973–1975) and played on one Super Bowl-winning team in nine seasons with the Raiders. He is also known for a hit he made against New England Patriots wide receiver Darryl Stingley in a 1978 preseason game that paralyzed Stingley from the neck down. He won a national championship at Ohio State.

A member of the College Football Hall of Fame, Tatum played college football for the Ohio State Buckeyes and was a twice an All-American in 1969 and 1970. He was selected by the Raiders in the first round of the 1971 NFL draft with whom he earned a reputation as a fierce competitor and one of the hardest hitters ever to play the game. Tatum was also noted for his involvement in the Immaculate Reception play during a 1972 playoff game versus the Pittsburgh Steelers.

Tatum's playing style was well recognized in the 1970s and his New York Times obituary stated Tatum was a "symbol of a violent game".

== Early life ==
Tatum was born in Cherryville, North Carolina and grew up in Passaic, New Jersey, where he had little interest in playing sports in his early years. Tatum did not begin playing football until he entered his sophomore year at Passaic High School, where he played as a running back, fullback and defensive back and was selected first-team All-State. He was selected a high school All-American as a senior. In 1999, the Newark Star-Ledger named Tatum as one of New Jersey's top ten defensive players of the century.

== College career ==
Tatum visited a number of universities before starting his collegiate career with Ohio State University Buckeyes. Head coach Woody Hayes recruited Tatum as a running back. However, assistant coach Lou Holtz convinced Hayes to switch Tatum to defensive back during Tatum's freshman season. Tatum was used by the Buckeyes to cover the opposing team's best wide receiver but he also was used occasionally as a linebacker due to the nature of his hits and an innate ability to bring down even the biggest fullback or tight end. He first became known to college football observers as a sophomore when he helped limit All-American Leroy Keyes during a 13–0 upset against the Purdue Boilermakers during the early part of the 1968 season.

Tatum was a first-team All-Big Ten in 1968, 1969 and 1970. In his final two seasons he was a unanimous All-American. In 1970, he was selected as the National Defensive Player of the Year and was among the top vote getters for the Heisman Trophy, which is awarded to the athlete considered to have been the nation's best college football player that year. Tatum helped lead the Buckeyes to a 27–2 record in his three seasons as a starter, with two national championship appearances, two Big Ten titles and a national championship in 1968. In the storied rivalry between Ohio State and Michigan, Tatum and his fellow Buckeyes won in 1968 (50–14), lost in 1969 (24–12), and won again in 1970 (20–9).

Tatum was inducted into the Ohio State Varsity O Hall of Fame in 1981 and into the College Football Hall of Fame in 2004. In 2001, Ohio State head coach Jim Tressel instituted the "Jack Tatum Hit of the Week Award", given to the player who had the most impressive defensive hit of the game. Upon hearing of his death, Tressel said, "We have lost one of our greatest Buckeyes."

== Professional career ==
Tatum was drafted by the Oakland Raiders as the 19th pick in the first round of the 1971 NFL draft to replace former Oakland safety Dave Grayson, who retired after the 1970 season, and for "defensive stability". A few weeks later, Tatum signed a three-year, six-figure contract with a $50,000 signing bonus, equivalent to $397,494 in 2025. Tatum was nicknamed "the Assassin," a moniker he embraced and relished. However, according to his former head coach John Madden, Tatum was never called by that nickname during his playing career. Tatum played his first professional game against the Baltimore Colts, in which he tackled and knocked out Colts tight ends John Mackey and Tom Mitchell. Soon after the game, sportswriters started to compare him to Chicago Bears linebacker Dick Butkus because of his hard-hitting skills and he became the starting free safety in his rookie year.

In his first six seasons, Tatum made 19 interceptions.

In Super Bowl XI, on January 9, 1977, Tatum knocked the helmet off Minnesota Vikings wide receiver Sammy White. This is often regarded as one of the biggest hits in Super Bowl history. The Raiders defeated the Vikings, 32–14.

Tatum never apologized for his style of play, stating that, "It's unrealistic. If you want to play football for a living, you're going to get injured."

=== Immaculate Reception ===
Tatum was involved in one of the more significant plays in National Football League history, the Immaculate Reception, during the AFC divisional playoff game against the Pittsburgh Steelers on December 23, 1972. With 22 seconds left in the game, Steelers quarterback Terry Bradshaw threw a pass to running back John "Frenchy" Fuqua. Tatum collided with Fuqua, knocking the ball into the air. The ball fell into the hands of Steelers running back Franco Harris, who ran it 42 yards for the game-winning touchdown. The play is famous because NFL rules at the time prohibited a receiver from batting the ball to another player of the same team. The referees ruled that Tatum had touched the ball and therefore Harris’ touchdown was good, allowing the Steelers to win the game.

=== Darryl Stingley incident ===
Tatum's most infamous hit came in an exhibition game against the New England Patriots on August 12, 1978, a play that Tatum later stated he did "thousands of times" in practice and in regular game coverage. Tatum and Patriots wide receiver Darryl Stingley collided as Stingley was leaping for a pass on an inside slant route, a play the Patriots had run earlier in the game that put him in the path of Tatum. There was an awkward collision as Stingley lowered his helmet to protect himself and hit Tatum's shoulder pad. The impact compressed Stingley's spinal cord, breaking his fourth and fifth cervical vertebrae and leaving him with incomplete quadriplegia for the rest of his life. The NFL took no disciplinary action for the tackle but they did tighten the rules on violent hits. Since Tatum did not lead with his helmet or make head-to-head contact with Stingley, no penalty was called.

The incident affected Tatum personally and for several years, according to close friend John Hicks, made him "somewhat of a recluse". According to Madden, "It was something that ate at him for his whole life." According to Stingley in his 1983 autobiography, Happy To Be Alive, Tatum never made any effort to apologize or to see him after the incident. Gene Upshaw, a teammate and future executive, described the hit as "one of those things that happens that everyone regrets". Tatum had said he attempted to visit Stingley in the hospital but was rebuffed by Stingley's family. They were supposed to meet once in a television interview but Stingley backed out when he found out Tatum would be promoting his new autobiography during the interview. The two never spoke with each other after that day, although Stingley related in a 2003 Boston Globe interview that he had forgiven Tatum. "It's hard to articulate," he said. "It was a test of my faith, the entire story. In who, and how much, do you believe, Darryl? In my heart and mind, I forgave Jack Tatum a long time ago."

=== 1980 season with Houston Oilers ===
Tatum was traded to the Houston Oilers for running back Kenny King and seventh round draft choices in the 1980 and 1981 NFL drafts. He finished his pro career with them, playing all 16 games that year, and recorded a career-high seven interceptions in the season.

=== Career NFL statistics ===
Tatum finished his career with total of 37 interceptions with 736 return yards. He also recovered 10 fumbles in his career, returning them for 164 yards.

== Retirement ==
Tatum retired after being released by the Oilers following the 1980 season. He first worked for the Raiders organization, and soon became a land developer and moved into the real-estate business. Tatum became part owner of a restaurant in Pittsburg, California. He married and had three children, and wrote three best-selling books: They Call Me Assassin (1980); They Still Call Me Assassin (1989); and Final Confessions of NFL Assassin Jack Tatum (1996).

== Health issues and death ==
Tatum eventually faced his own disability challenges, as all five toes on his left foot were amputated in 2003 due to a staph infection caused by diabetes. He soon lost the entire leg below the knee because of the illness. He also suffered from an arterial blockage that cost him his right leg; he used a prosthetic limb thereafter. Tatum worked on increasing awareness of diabetes. To facilitate this goal, he created the Ohio-based Jack Tatum Fund for Youthful Diabetes, which finances diabetes research. His kidneys started to fail in his final years, and he was awaiting a kidney transplant at the time of his death.

Tatum died in Oakland on July 27, 2010 after a heart attack. The Oakland Raiders released a statement that: "Jack was the standard bearer and an inspiration for the position of safety throughout college and professional football," while Ronnie Lott stated that Tatum was one of his "football heroes". Sportswriters John Clayton and Peter Richmond both wrote on Tatum's NFL legacy. Clayton wrote that Tatum was part of the reason why the Steelers-Raiders matchup was his most anticipated game of the season while starting his sportswriting career in Pittsburgh, and that Tatum hit like "no other safety in football". Richmond, an Oakland journalist and insider, wrote about Tatum's quiet demeanor off the field, which was contrary to most journalistic reports about Tatum. Steve Grogan, Stingley's teammate when asked to make a comment about Tatum's death, stated: "I have a hard time trying to find something nice to say.... I just can't do it. When something like that happens and you can't apologize for it, go out and write a book to make money and try to get famous off the incident, that's just not right."

== Legacy ==
The Oakland Raiders were one of the more resilient teams of the 1970s, and Tatum's leadership was a major contributor. Along with future Pro Football Hall of Famer Willie Brown, safety George Atkinson and cornerback Skip Thomas, Tatum was part of the "Soul Patrol" secondary. He was ranked as the sixth hardest hitter in NFL history by NFL Films and was elected to three Pro Bowls.

Tatum holds the record for the longest fumble return in NFL history. In a game against the Green Bay Packers on September 24, 1972, he returned a fumble 104 yards for a touchdown. The record was tied 28 years later by Aeneas Williams.

Tatum was honored by Passaic High School during their 2008 season. The final game of the football season, Passaic's annual Thanksgiving matchup with rival Clifton High School, was regarded as "Jack Tatum Day" and the school honored him with a ceremony at halftime where his number 32 was officially retired.

In 1999, Sports Illustrated included him on its All-Century Team for college football.
