= Jan White =

American football player (born 1948)

No. 80
- Position: Tight end

Personal information
- Born: October 6, 1948 (age 78); Harrisburg, Pennsylvania, U.S.
- Listed height: 6 ft 2 in (1.88 m)
- Listed weight: 216 lb (98 kg)

Career information
- High school: John Harris (Harrisburg)
- College: Ohio State (1967–1970)
- NFL draft: 1971: 2nd round, 29th overall pick

Career history
- Buffalo Bills (1971–1972)

Awards and highlights
- 2× National champion (1968, 1970); First-team All-American (1970); 2× Second-team All-Big Ten (1969, 1970)

Career NFL statistics
- Receptions: 25
- Receiving yards: 278
- Receiving TDs: 2
- Stats at Pro Football Reference

Jan Andre White (born October 6, 1948) is an American former professional football player who was a tight end for two seasons with the Buffalo Bills of the National Football League (NFL). He was selected by the Bills in the second round of the 1971 NFL draft after playing college football for the Ohio State Buckeyes.

== Early life ==
Jan Andre White was born on October 6, 1948, in Harrisburg, Pennsylvania. He attended John Harris High School in Harrisburg.

== College career ==
White played college football for the Buckeyes of Ohio State University. He was on the freshman team in 1967 and was a three-year letterman from 1968 to 1970. He caught 20 passes for 266 yards and one touchdown in 1968 as the Buckeyes were named consensus national champions. White totaled 23 receptions for 308 yards and five touchdowns during the 1969 season, earning Associated Press (AP) and United Press International (UPI) second-team All-Big Ten honors. He caught 13 passes for 143 yards and two touchdowns in 1970, garnering UPI second-team All-Big Ten and Newspaper Enterprise Association first-team All-American honors. Ohio State was named co-national champions by the National Football Foundation for the 1970 season.

== Professional career ==
White was selected by the Buffalo Bills in the second round, with the 29th overall pick, of the 1971 NFL draft. He played in 13 games, all starts, for the Bills in 1971, catching 13 passes for 130 yards. He started all 14 games during the 1972 season, recording 12 receptions for 148 yards and two touchdowns. White was released by the Bills in 1973.
