= 1969 Michigan Wolverines football team =

American college football season

1969 Michigan Wolverines football

Big Ten co-champion

Rose Bowl, L 3–10 vs. USC
- Conference: Big Ten Conference

Ranking
- Coaches: No. 8
- AP: No. 9
- Record: 8–3 (6–1 Big Ten)
- Head coach: Bo Schembechler (1st season)
- Defensive coordinator: Jim Young (1st season)
- MVP: Jim Mandich
- Captain: Jim Mandich
- Home stadium: Michigan Stadium

1969 Big Ten Conference football standings
	Conf.					Overall
Team	W		L		T	W		L		T
No. 4 Ohio State +	6	–	1	–	0	8	–	1	–	0
No. 9 Michigan +	6	–	1	–	0	8	–	3	–	0
No. 18 Purdue	5	–	2	–	0	8	–	2	–	0
Minnesota	4	–	3	–	0	4	–	5	–	1
Iowa	3	–	4	–	0	5	–	5	–	0
Indiana	3	–	4	–	0	4	–	6	–	0
Northwestern	3	–	4	–	0	3	–	7	–	0
Wisconsin	3	–	4	–	0	3	–	7	–	0
Michigan State	2	–	5	–	0	4	–	6	–	0
Illinois	0	–	7	–	0	0	–	10	–	0
+ – Conference co-champions; Rankings from AP Poll

The 1969 Michigan Wolverines football team was an American football team that represented the University of Michigan in the 1969 Big Ten Conference football season. In their first year under head coach Bo Schembechler, the Wolverines compiled an 8–3 record (6–1 Big Ten), played in the 1970 Rose Bowl, and finished the season ranked No. 9 in the final AP poll and No. 8 in the final UPI poll.

The 1969 Michigan vs. Ohio State football game was considered one of the biggest upsets in college football history, as Ohio State came into the game with a 22-game winning streak and the No. 1 ranking in the polls. Michigan intercepted six Ohio State passes and defeated the Buckeyes, 24–12, in front of a crowd of 103,588 at Michigan Stadium to win the Big Ten Conference's berth in the 1970 Rose Bowl. The game was also the first in a series that came to be known as "The Ten Year War".

Bo Schembechler suffered a heart attack the night before the 1970 Rose Bowl game against an undefeated (but once tied) USC team. The Wolverines lost the Rose Bowl in a defensive struggle by a score of 10–3.

Team captain and tight end Jim Mandich was selected as the team's most valuable player and as a first-team All-American. Defensive back Tom Curtis was also selected as a first-team All-American. Six members of the team received first-team honors on the 1969 All-Big Ten Conference football team: Mandich at tight end; Curtis at defensive back; Dan Dierdorf at tackle; Guy Murdock at center; Billy Taylor at running back; and Marty Huff at linebacker. Thirteen members of the 1969 team went on to play professional football, and four players (Mandich, Curtis, Dierdorf and offensive guard Reggie McKenzie) were inducted into the College Football Hall of Fame.

== Schedule ==
Date	Opponent	Rank	Site	TV	Result	Attendance
September 20	Vanderbilt*		Michigan Stadium; Ann Arbor, MI		W 42–14	70,183
September 27	Washington*	No. 20	Michigan Stadium; Ann Arbor, MI	ABC	W 45–7	49,684
October 4	No. 9 Missouri*	No. 13	Michigan Stadium; Ann Arbor, MI		L 17–40	64,476
October 11	No. 9 Purdue		Michigan Stadium; Ann Arbor, MI		W 31–20	80,411
October 18	at Michigan State	No. 13	Spartan Stadium; East Lansing, MI (rivalry)		L 12–23	79,368
October 25	at Minnesota		Memorial Stadium; Minneapolis, MN (Little Brown Jug)		W 35–9	44,028
November 1	Wisconsin^{†}	No. 20	Michigan Stadium; Ann Arbor, MI		W 35–7	60,438
November 8	at Illinois	No. 18	Memorial Stadium; Champaign, IL (rivalry)		W 57–0	35,270
November 15	at Iowa	No. 14	Iowa Stadium; Iowa City, IA		W 51–6	45,981
November 22	No. 1 Ohio State	No. 12	Michigan Stadium; Ann Arbor, MI (The Game)	ABC	W 24–12	103,588
January 1, 1970	vs. No. 5 USC*	No. 7	Rose Bowl; Pasadena, CA (Rose Bowl)	NBC	L 3–10	103,878
*Non-conference game; ^{†}Homecoming; Rankings from AP Poll released prior to the game

== Season summary ==
=== Preseason ===
The 1968 Michigan team compiled an 8–2 record (6–1 Big Ten), finished second in the Big Ten, and was ranked No. 12 in the final AP Poll. The season ended with a humiliating 50–14 loss to Ohio State on November 23, 1968. On December 25, the Detroit Free Press reported that Michigan was searching for a new head coach and that Bump Elliott's resignation was imminent. The following day, Michigan athletic director Don Canham hired Bo Schembechler, the 39-year-old head coach at Miami of Ohio, to take over as the Wolverines' head coach. Schembechler had played football at Miami under Woody Hayes and compiled a 40-16-3 record in six seasons as Miami's head coach.

Schembechler brought the core of his coaching staff with him from Miami, including Jim Young, Gary Moeller, Larry Smith, Jerry Hanlon, Chuck Stobart, and Dick Hunter. Schembechler also retained three assistants from Bump Elliott's coaching staff: George Mans, Frank Maloney, and Bob Shaw.

One of the principal challenges facing the new coaching staff was finding a replacement for 1968 All-American running back Ron Johnson. The leading candidates were Glenn Doughty and Billy Taylor, two sophomores with zero minutes of game experience at the college level.

Another change in 1969 was the removal of Michigan Stadium's natural grass and the installation of 3M's "Tartan Turf" playing surface, purchased at a cost of a quarter of a million dollars.

Veterans from the 1968 team who returned in 1969 included end Jim Mandich, defensive back Tom Curtis, offensive tackle Dan Dierdorf, middle guard Henry Hill, and fullback Garvie Craw.

On September 4, 1969, coach Schembechler announced that Jim Mandich had been elected team captain. Mandich called it "the greatest honor of my life."

=== Vanderbilt ===
Week 1: Vanderbilt at Michigan

Team	1	2	3	4	Total
Vanderbilt	0	0	7	7	14
• Michigan	7	7	0	28	42

- Date: September 20
- Location: Ann Arbor, MI
- Game attendance: 70,183

Scoring summary
1	MICH	Garvie Craw 1-yard run (Frank Titas kick)	MICH 7–0
2	MICH	Glenn Doughty 80-yard run (Titas kick)	MICH 14–0
3	VAND	Matthews 1-yard run (Wolins kick)	MICH 14–7
4	MICH	Don Moorhead 2-yard run (Titas kick)	MICH 21–7
4	MICH	Ralph Huff 31-yard blocked punt return (Titas kick)	MICH 28–7
4	MICH	Moorhead 1-yard run (Titas kick)	MICH 35–7
4	VAND	Valput 2-yard run (Wolins kick)	MICH 35–14
4	MICH	Eric Federico 5-yard run (Titas kick)	MICH 42–14

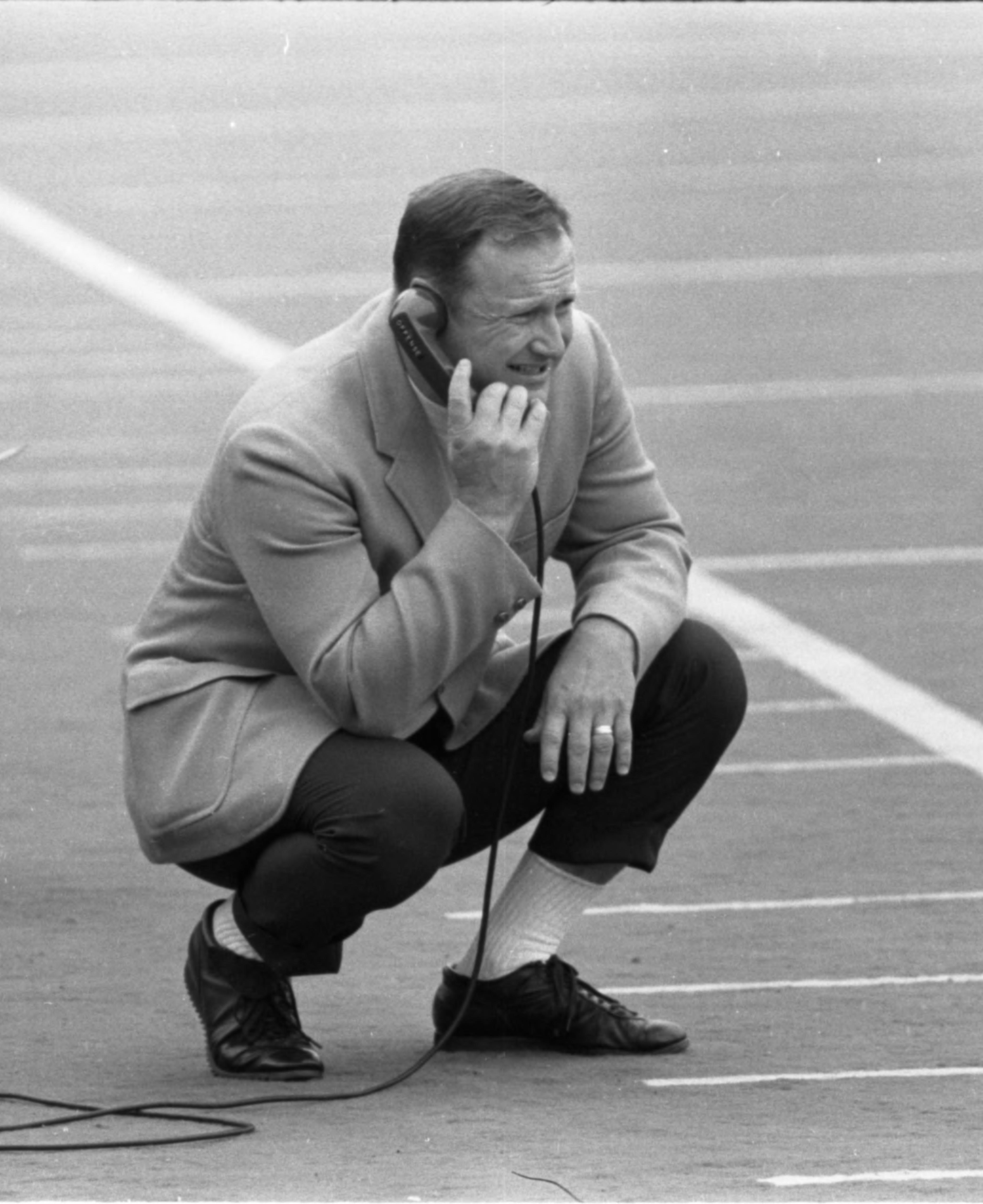
Coach Schembechler during the game versus Vanderbilt

On September 20, 1969, Michigan played its first game under new head coach Bo Schembechler. The Wolverines defeated Vanderbilt, 42–14, at Michigan Stadium. Garvie Craw capped a 71-yard drive with a one-yard touchdown run in the first quarter, and Glenn Doughty ran 80 yards for a touchdown in the second quarter. Michigan led, 14-0, at halftime. In the fourth quarter, Mike Keller blocked a Vanderbilt punt, and Marty Huff returned the ball 31 yards for a touchdown. On the next Vanderbilt drive, Tom Curtis intercepted a pass and returned it 45 yards to set up quarterback Don Moorhead's second rushing touchdown. Michigan led, 14-7, at the end of the third quarter, then scored 28 points in the fourth. On defense, Michigan held Vanderbilt to 55 rushing yards.

Michigan rushed for 367 yards (209 in the first half) and passed for only 42. Doughty led the way with 138 rushing yards on 15 carries, and Moorhead added 103 yards on 11 carries. Jim Mandich caught two passes to move into second place on Michigan's all-time receptions list with 71.

In his first post-game press conference, Schembechler noted: "We're not a fancy ball club. Secondly, when you can punch the football down their throats, that's what you should do." Quarterback Don Moorhead added: "That's Bo's offense -- just basic stuff. We stick it to 'em. It's what he calls grinding meat."

After the game, a crowd of 12,000 participated in a post-game, anti-war rally on The Diag. David Dellinger, one of the Chicago Eight, was the main speaker at the rally.

=== Washington ===
Week 2: Washington at Michigan

Team	1	2	3	4	Total
Washington	0	0	7	0	7
• Michigan	6	6	12	21	45

- Date: September 27
- Location: Ann Arbor, MI
- Game attendance: 49,684
- Television network: ABC

Scoring summary
Q1	MICH	Jim Mandich 9-yard pass from Don Moorhead (kick failed)	MICH 6–0
Q2	MICH	Moorhead 5-yard run (run failed)	MICH 12–0
Q3	MICH	Moorhead 1-yard run (run failed)	MICH 18–0
Q3	MICH	Moorhead 9-yard run (run failed)	MICH 24–0
Q3	WASH	Kennamer 7-yard pass from Hanzlik (Volbrecht kick)	MICH 24–7
Q4	MICH	Glenn Doughty 19-yard run (Frank Titas kick)	MICH 31–7
Q4	MICH	Garvie Craw 1-yard run (Tim Killian kick)	MICH 38–7
Q4	MICH	Bill Harris 59-yard pass from Jim Betts (Killian kick)	MICH 45–7

On September 27, 1969, Michigan defeated Washington, 45–7, before a Michigan Stadium crowd of 49,684—the lowest attendance for a Michigan home game since 1963. In the first quarter, Jim Mandich scored on a six-yard pass from Don Moorhead, but the kick for extra point failed. Moorhead scored on a five-yard run off a broken play in the second quarter, and Moorhead's run for two-point conversion failed. Michigan led, 12-0, at halftime. Moorhead ran for two additional touchdowns in the third quarter, and runs for two-point conversions failed each time. Michigan added three touchdowns in the fourth quarter, including a 59-yard pass from Jim Betts to Bill Harris.

Michigan totaled 581 yards of total offense (362 rushing, 219 passing), breaking a Michigan single-game record of 531 yards set in 1943. Glenn Doughty and Moorhead led the team on offense. Doughty rushed for 191 yards on 29 carries. Moorhead rushed for 128 yards and completed 14 of 19 passes for 160 yards. After the game, Schembechler explained his increased reliance on the passing game: "Washington is a very tough inside team. We felt we had to go wide and throw the football." On defense, Tom Curtis and Barry Pierson intercepted two passes each.

=== Missouri ===
Week 3: Missouri at Michigan

Team	1	2	3	4	Total
• Missouri	0	24	0	16	40
Michigan	3	0	14	0	17

- Date: October 4
- Location: Ann Arbor, MI
- Game attendance: 64,476

Scoring summary
1	MICH	Tim Killian, 40-yard field goal	MICH 3–0
2	MIZZ	Henry Brown 26-yard field goal	TIE 3–3
2	MIZZ	McBride 2-yard run (Brown kick)	MIZZ 10–3
2	MIZZ	Jon Staggers 1-yard run (Brown kick)	MIZZ 17–3
2	MISS	McBride 1-yard run (Brown kick)	MIZZ 24–3
3	MICH	Garvie Craw 1-yard run (Titas kick)	MIZZ 24–10
3	MICH	Craw 1-yard run (Titas kick)	MIZZ 31–17
3	MIZZ	Brown 24-yard field goal	MIZZ 34–17
3	MIZZ	Joe Moore 42-yard run (Brown kick)	MIZZ 41–17
4	MIZZ	Steve Kenemore 8-yard pass from Roper (kick failed)	MIZZ 47–17

On October 4, 1969, Michigan, ranked No. 11 in the Coaches Poll, lost to Dan Devine's No. 9 Missouri Tigers by a 40–17 score before a crowd of 64,476 at Michigan Stadium. On offense, Michigan was limited to 82 rushing yards and 99 passing yards. Starting running back Glenn Doughty had 72 rushing yards on 22 carries but suffered an ankle injury. Quarterback Don Moorhead totaled minus 22 rushing yards. The Wolverines were also stymied by mistakes, as they turned the ball over five times on four fumbles and an interception. They also had a punt blocked, gave up seven quarterback sacks, and were penalized 11 times for 78 yards. After the game, coach Schembechler said: "You can't turn the ball over time and again, time and again, and win football games. That was the worst performance by one of my teams in years -- and I haven't had a punt blocked in six years. . . . I didn't know what one looked like."

=== Purdue ===
Week 4: Purdue at Michigan

Team	1	2	3	4	Total
Purdue	0	14	0	6	20
• Michigan	7	7	10	7	31

- Date: October 11
- Location: Ann Arbor, MI
- Game attendance: 80,411

Scoring summary
Q1	MICH	Glenn Doughty 6-yard run (Frank Titas kick)	MICH 7–0
Q2	MICH	Garvie Craw 4-yard run (Titas kick)	MICH 14–0
Q2	PUR	Mike Phipps 1-yard run (Jones kick)	MICH 14–7
Q2	PUR	Ashley Bell 6-yard pass from Phipps (Jones kick)	MICH 14–14
Q3	MICH	Tim Killian 32-yard field goal	MICH 17–14
Q3	MICH	Don Moorhead 1-yard run (Titas kick)	MICH 24–14
Q4	MICH	Jim Mandich 4-yard pass (Titas kick)	MICH 31–14
Q4	PUR	Scott Clayton 2-yard pass from Phipps (run failed)	MICH 31–20

On October 11, 1969, Michigan, unranked after its loss to Missouri, upset previously unbeaten No. 9 Purdue, 31–20, before a crowd of 80,411 at Michigan Stadium. Michigan had previously lost five games in a row against the Boilermakers dating back to 1962.

On offense, Michigan struggled on the ground, gaining a season low 123 net rushing yards (50 by Billy Taylor, 41 by Glenn Doughty). Doughty re-injured his right ankle in the third quarter, opening the door for Billy Taylor to take over as Michigan's No 1 running back in the second half of the season. Quarterback Don Moorhead picked up the slack, completing 15 of 25 passes for 247 yards. Tight end Jim Mandich caught 10 of Moorhead's passes for 156 yards and a touchdown.

Purdue outgained Michigan by a total of 416 yards to 370. Purdue quarterback Mike Phipps came into the game as the national leader in total offense and a leading candidate for the Heisman Trophy. He rushed for a touchdown and completed 22 of 44 passes for 250 yards and two touchdowns. Purdue fullback John Bullock also stood out with 84 rushing yards and 81 receiving yards. However, Michigan's defense intercepted four of Phipps' passes (three by Marty Huff, one by Tom Curtis) and recovered three Purdue fumbles (one of the fumbles by Phipps).

The game also featured Bo Schembechler's first major run-in with Big Ten Conference officials. When Michigan's middle guard Henry Hill assisted an injured teammate (Cecil Pryor) off the field, an official thought Hill was being illegally substituted into the game and threw a flag. Schembechler rushed onto the field to confront the official and was penalized for unsportsmanlike conduct. The dual penalties gave Purdue the ball at Michigan's one-yard line, setting up the first Purdue touchdown.

=== Michigan State ===
Week 5: Michigan at Michigan State

Team	1	2	3	4	Total
Michigan	0	3	7	2	12
• Michigan State	0	16	7	0	23

- Date: October 18
- Location: East Lansing, MI
- Game attendance: 79,368

Scoring summary
2	MICH	Tim Killian 29-yard field goal	MICH 3–0
2	MSU	Don Highsmith 2-yard run (Gary Boyce kick)	MSU 7–3
2	MSU	Bill Triplett 10-yard run (Boyce kick)	MSU 14–3
2	MSU	Safety (Glenn Doughty downed ball in end zone)	MSU 16–3
3	MSU	Highsmith 3-yard run (Boyce kick)	MSU 23–3
3	MICH	Doughty 7-yard run (Titas kick)	MSU 23–10
4	MICH	Safety (Pat Miller stepped out of end zone)	MSU 23–12

On October 18, 1969, Michigan lost to Duffy Daugherty's Michigan State Spartans by a 23–12 score in front of a crowd of 79,368 in East Lansing. Led by halfback Don Highsmith (134 rushing yards and two touchdowns on a Big Ten record 30 carries) and quarterback Bill Triplett (143 rushing yards and a touchdown on 18 carries), the Spartans outgained the Wolverines on the ground by totals of 348 yards to 176. On being told after the game that his team had allowed 348 rushing yards, coach Schembechler replied: "That's terrible . . you can't win a football game that way, not unless you're scoring 30 or 40 points."

Forced to throw after Michigan State took a 23–3 lead, Michigan quarterback Don Moorhead completed 13 of 35 passes for 164 yards. Tight end Jim Mandich caught nine of Moorhead's passes for 118 yards. Glenn Doughty rushed for 89 yards and a touchdown on 26 carries, but he also fumbled for an 11-yard loss, missed a block leading to a quarterback sack, and was tagged with a safety after he caught a kickoff at the one-yard line, stepped back into the end zone, and downed the ball for what he thought was a touchback. In the fourth quarter, Spartan punter Pat Miller took an intentional safety rather than punting from the end zone.

=== Minnesota ===
Week 6: Michigan at Minnesota

Team	1	2	3	4	Total
• Michigan	0	7	14	14	35
Minnesota	3	6	0	0	9

- Date: October 25
- Location: Minneapolis
- Game attendance: 44,028

Scoring summary
1	MINN	Jeff Nygren 35-yard field goal	MINN 3–0
2	MICH	Billy Taylor 8-yard pass from Don Moorhead (Frank Titas kick)	MICH 7–3
2	MINN	Mel Anderson 42-yard field goal	MICH 7–6
2	MINN	Anderson 37-yard field goal	MINN 9–7
3	MICH	Taylor 3-yard run (Titas kick)	MICH 14–9
3	MICH	Taylor 1-yard run (Titas kick)	MICH 21–9
4	MICH	Moorhead 6-yard run (Titas kick)	MICH 28–9
4	MICH	Lance Scheffler 10-yard run (Titas kick)	MICH 35–9

On October 25, 1969, Michigan defeated Minnesota, 35–9, in the annual Little Brown Jug game, played before a crowd of 44,028 in Minneapolis. Michigan's offense sputtered in the first half, as Ted Killian missed two field goal attempts, and the Wolverines trailed, 9–7, at halftime.

The Wolverines rebounded in the second half, scoring 28 unanswered points. With Glenn Doughty sidelined due to ankle and thigh injuries, Billy Taylor started his first game as Michigan's tailback. Taylor totaled 151 rushing yards on 31 carries and scored Michigan's first three touchdowns. Quarterback Don Moorhead had 61 rushing yards and a touchdown and completed eight of 12 passes for 92 yards. Michigan totaled 285 rushing yards and 103 passing yards. On defense, the Wolverines limited the Gophers to 75 rushing yards, 182 passing yards, and three field goals, and intercepted two Minnesota passes. Middle guard Henry Hill led the defense with eight solo tackles and three assists.

After the game, coach Schembechler called the game "our greatest win of the year."

=== Wisconsin ===
Week 7: Wisconsin at Michigan

Team	1	2	3	4	Total
Wisconsin	0	0	7	0	7
• Michigan	14	21	0	0	35

- Date: November 1
- Location: Ann Arbor, MI
- Game attendance: 60,438

Scoring summary
1	MICH	Billy Taylor 37-yard run (Frank Titas kick)	MICH 7–0
1	MICH	Taylor 51-yard run (Titas kick)	MICH 14–0
2	MICH	Garvie Craw 1-yard run (Titas kick)	MICH 21–0
2	MICH	Barry Pierson 51-yard punt return (Titas kick)	MICH 28–0
2	MICH	Jim Mandich 12-yard pass from Don Moorhead (Titas kick)	MICH 35–0
3	WISC	Crooks 30-yard run (Jaeger kick)	MICH 35–7

On November 1, 1969, Michigan defeated Wisconsin, 35–7, in the rain before a homecoming crowd of 60,438 at Michigan Stadium. Michigan scored all of its 35 points in the first half. Billy Taylor, playing in place of the injured Glenn Doughty, rushed for 142 yards, including touchdown runs of 37 and 51 yards in the first quarter. In the second quarter, Barry Pierson added a 51-yard punt return, Tom Curtis intercepted a pass at Michigan's eight-yard line and returned it 27 yards, and Jim Mandich scored on a 12-yard pass from Don Moorhead.

=== Illinois ===
Week 8: Michigan at Illinois

Team	1	2	3	4	Total
• Michigan	0	23	7	27	57
Illinois	0	0	0	0	0

- Date: November 8
- Location: Champaign, IL
- Game attendance: 35,270

Scoring summary
2	MICH	Tim Killian 28-yard field goal	MICH 3–0
2	MICH	Billy Taylor 84-yard run (kick failed)	MICH 9–0
2	MICH	Garvie Craw 8-yard run (run failed)	MICH 15–0
2	MICH	Craw 1-yard run (Bill Harris pass from Don Moorhead)	MICH 23–0
3	MICH	Craw 1-yard run (Frank Titas kick)	MICH 30–0
4	MICH	Craw 5-yard pass from Jim Betts (Titas kick)	MICH 37–0
4	MICH	Betts 1-yard run (Titas kick)	MICH 44–0
4	MICH	John Gabler 13-yard pass from Betts (kick failed)	MICH 50–0
4	MICH	Bruce Elliott 40-yard interception return (Titas kick)	MICH 57–0

On November 8, 1969, Michigan defeated Illinois, 57–0, before a crowd of 35,270 at Memorial Stadium in Champaign, Illinois. The Michigan Daily reported that the 57-point margin "the worst drubbing either school has received in this long and fabled rivalry that dates to 1898." Michigan totaled 524 yards of total offense (328 rushing and 196 passing).

After a scoreless first quarter, Michigan's Tim Killian kicked a 28-yard field goal in the second quarter. Tailback Billy Taylor then scored on an 84-yard touchdown run. Taylor totaled 155 yards on 13 carries, all in the first half. Fullback Garvie Craw scored four touchdowns, two in the second quarter and one each in the third and fourth quarters. After the game, coach Schembechler said: "Garvie Craw is a strong runner. His average per carry is very low, but he always has the tough yardage to get."

Backup quarterback Jim Betts was responsible for three fourth-quarter touchdowns, on passes to Craw and John Gabler and the other on a quarterback sneak. Betts tallied 157 yards of total offense (106 passing yards and 51 rushing yards). Defensive back Bruce Elliott, the son of former Illinois coach Pete Elliott and a graduate of Champaign Central High School, concluded the scoring on a 40-yard interception return for a touchdown with 39 seconds remaining in the game.

Despite the impressive win, coach Schembechler was characteristically guarded in his post-game press conference: "We didn't play well. The defense was not sharp in the first half and neither was the offense."

=== Iowa ===
Week 9: Michigan at Iowa

Team	1	2	3	4	Total
• Michigan	7	24	14	6	51
Iowa	0	0	0	6	6

- Date: November 15
- Location: Iowa City, IA
- Game attendance: 45,981

Scoring summary
1	MICH	Don Moorhead 1-yard run (Frank Titas kick)	MICH 7–0
2	MICH	Billy Taylor 33-yard run (Titas kick)	MICH 14–0
2	MICH	Taylor 71-yard run (Titas kick)	MICH 21–0
2	MICH	Tim Killian 27-yard field goal	MICH 24–0
2	MICH	Jim Mandich 26-yard pass from Moorhead (Titas kick)	MICH 31–0
3	MICH	Garvie Craw 1-yard run (Titas kick)	MICH 38–0
3	MICH	Jim Betts 6-yard run (Titas kick)	MICH 45–0
4	MICH	Betts 6-yard run (kick blocked)	MICH 51–0
4	IOWA	Denny Green 14-yard pass from Larry Lawrence (run failed)	MICH 51–6

On November 15, 1969, Michigan defeated Iowa, 51–6, in Iowa City. Michigan set three Big Ten Conference single-game records with 524 rushing yards, 673 yards of total offense, and 34 first downs. Running back Billy Taylor led the attack with 225 rushing yards and two touchdowns on 21 carries, all in the first three quarters. Adding to the attack were Glenn Doughty (100 rushing yards), Don Moorhead (90 passing yards, 80 rushing yards), Bill Harris (80 receiving yards), Garvie Craw (51 rushing yards), and Jim Betts (50 rushing yards). Iowa's only touchdown was scored with 22 seconds remaining in the game.

Asked after the game whether Michigan could beat Ohio State, Iowa coach Ray Nagel replied: "They can beat anybody in the country."

=== Ohio State ===
Week 10: Ohio State at Michigan

Team	1	2	3	4	Total
Ohio State	6	6	0	0	12
• Michigan	7	17	0	0	24

- Date: November 22
- Location: Ann Arbor, MI
- Game start: 1:30 p.m.
- Game attendance: 103,588
- Game weather: Sunny • 45 °F (7 °C)
- Referee: Jerry Markbreit

Scoring summary
1	7:38	OSU	Jim Otis 1-yard run (White kick failed)	OSU 6–0
1	3:35	MICH	Garvie Craw 2-yard run (Titas kick)	MICH 7–6
2	14:52	OSU	Jan White 22-yard pass from Rex Kern (run failed)	OSU 12–7
2	11:54	MICH	Craw 1-yard run (Titas kick)	MICH 14–12
2	10:10	MICH	Don Moorhead 2-yard run (Titas kick)	MICH 21–12
2	1:15	MICH	Ted Killian 25-yard field goal	MICH 24–12

On November 22, 1969, Michigan, ranked No. 12 in the AP Poll, upset Woody Hayes' Ohio State Buckeyes, 24–12, before a crowd of 103,588 at Michigan Stadium. Ohio State entered the game ranked No. 1, riding a 22-game winning streak, and favored by 17 points. Ohio State running back Jim Otis rushed for 144 yards and a touchdown on 28 carries, but quarterback Rex Kern completed only six passes for 88 yards, and Michigan intercepted six Ohio State passes. Michigan defensive back Tom Curtis intercepted two passes and set an NCAA career record with 431 interception return yards. Barry Pierson also intercepted three passes and returned a punt 60 yards to set up Michigan's third touchdown.

On offense, Michigan running back Billy Taylor gained 84 yards on 23 carries while quarterback Don Moorhead completed 10 of 20 passes for 108 yards and gained 67 yards rushing. Fullback Garvie Craw scored two touchdowns, and tight end Jim Mandich caught six passes for 78 yards. Neither team scored in the second half.

=== 1970 Rose Bowl game ===
1970 Rose Bowl

Team	1	2	3	4	Total
Michigan	0	3	0	0	3
• USC	3	0	7	0	10

- Date: January 1, 1970
- Location: Pasadena, CA
- Game attendance: 103,878

Scoring summary
1	USC	Ron Ayala 25-yard field goal	USC 3–0
2	MICH	Tim Killian 20-yard field goal	TIE 3–3
3	USC	Bobby Chandler 33-yard pass from Jimmy Jones (Ayala kick)	USC 10–3

On January 1, 1970, Michigan, ranked No. 7 in the AP Poll, lost to John McKay's undefeated No. 5 USC Trojans, 10–3, before a crowd of 103,878 in the 1970 Rose Bowl game in Pasadena, California. Michigan coach Bo Schembechler was hospitalized with a heart attack four hours before the game began. Defensive coordinator Jim Young served as the acting head coach.

The teams traded field goals in the first half, and USC took the lead with three minutes remaining in the third quarter on a 33-yard touchdown pass from Jimmy Jones to Bobby Chandler. USC's "Wild Bunch" defense held Michigan 162 rushing yards and 127 passing yards.

In the fourth quarter, Michigan quarterback Don Moorhead led three drives into USC territory. On the first drive, Michigan took the ball to USC's 13-yard line, but Moorhead's pass on fourth down slipped through Garvie Craw's hands. On the next drive, Michigan drove to USC's nine-yard line where Craw was stopped on a fourth-and-one run. On the final drive, Moorhead threw 12 passes and converted twice on fourth down before time expired. The loss was Michigan's first in five Rose Bowl games.

=== Award season ===
In January 1970, the American Football Coaches Association selected Bo Schembechler as the Major College Coach of the Year. Schembechler was still in the hospital at the time of the award ceremony and quipped: "I may well be the only coach to win this award who failed to show up for his final game." Schembechler returned to Ann Arbor on January 19 following his discharge from the hospital.

Two Michigan players received first-team honors on the 1969 All-America team:

- Tight end Jim Mandich was a consensus All-American, receiving first-team honors from the American Football Coaches Association, Associated Press (AP), Central Press Association, Football Writers Association of America, Newspaper Enterprise Association, United Press International (UPI), The Football News, Time magazine, and the Walter Camp Football Foundation.
- Defensive back Tom Curtis received first-team honors from the Associated Press, Central Press, UPI, The Football News, and the Walter Camp Football Foundation.

Nine Michigan players received recognition from the AP and/or UPI on the 1969 All-Big Ten Conference football team: Jim Mandich at tight end (AP-1, UPI-1), Tom Curtis at defensive back (AP-1, UPI-1), Dan Dierdorf at offensive tackle (AP-1, UPI-1), Guy Murdock at center (UPI-1), Billy Taylor at running back (AP-2, UPI-1), Marty Huff at linebacker (AP-1, UPI-2), Cecil Taylor at defensive end (AP-2, UPI-2), Henry Hill at middle guard (AP-2, UPI-2), and Barry Pierson at defensive back (UPI-2).

Team awards were presented at the end of the season as follows:

- Most Valuable Player: Jim Mandich
- Meyer Morton Award: Don Moorhead
- John Maulbetsch Award: Glenn Doughty
- Frederick Matthei Award: Jack Harpring
- Arthur Robinson Scholarship Award: Brian Healy

== Personnel ==
=== Roster ===
1969 Michigan Wolverines football team roster
Players
Coaches
**Offense**

Pos.	#	Name	Class
OT	73	Morris Abrahams	Sr
G	60	Robert Baumgartner	Sr
QB	28	Will Berutti	Jr
QB	23	Jim Betts	Jr
OT	76	Jim Brandstatter	So
G	56	Richard Caldarazzo	Sr
FB	48	Garvie Craw	Sr
OT	72	Dan Dierdorf	Jr
TB	22	Glenn Doughty	So
FB	37	Eric Federico	Sr
HB	18	John Gabler	Sr
T/P	75	Werner Hall	Sr
TE	81	Mike Hankwitz	Sr
OT	71	Jack Harpring	Jr
E	80	William Harris	Jr
WB	44	Preston Henry	So
SE	86	Jerry Imsland	Sr
C, K	57	Timothy Killian	Jr
TE	88	Jim Mandich	Sr
G	65	Reggie McKenzie	So
QB	27	Don Moorhead	Jr
C	53	Guy Murdock	So
WR	84	Michael Oldham	So
OT	69	Robert Ritley	Sr
C	59	Peter Sarantos	Sr
TB	45	Lance Scheffler	Jr
FB	32	Fritz Seyferth	So
TE	85	Paul Seymour	So
WR	30	Paul Staroba	Jr
RB	42	Billy Taylor	So
G, K	64	Frank Titas	Sr

**Defense**

Pos.	#	Name	Class
DT	99	Tom Beckman	So
MG	34	Richard Brown	Sr
DE	94	Al Carpenter	So
K, DE	36	Dana Coin	So
DB	25	Tom Curtis	Sr
DB	35	Thom Darden	So
DB	21	Bruce Elliott	So
MG	31	Alan Francis	Sr
DT	92	Fred Grambau	So
CB	14	Frank Gusich	So
DB	24	Brian Healy	Sr
MG	39	Henry Hill	Jr
LB	70	Marty Huff	Jr
LB	63	Joseph Jones	Sr
DE	90	Mike Keller	So
DT	78	Richard McCoy Jr.	Jr
LB	97	Ed Moore	Jr
DT	82	Pete Newell	Jr
DT	74	Daniel Parks	Jr
DB	29	Barry Pierson	Sr
LB	55	Cecil Pryor	Sr
DE	13	Thomas Takach	Sr
LB	33	Mike Taylor	So
DB	41	Timothy Wadhams	Sr
DB, P	49	Mark Werner	Sr
DB	43	Robert White	Sr
LB	58	George Zuganellis	Sr

**Special teams**

Pos.	#	Name	Class

Head coach

- Bo Schembechler

Coordinators/assistant coaches

Legend

- **(C)** Team captain
- **(S)** Suspended
- **(I)** Ineligible
- Injured
- Redshirt

Roster

=== Offensive letter winners ===
The following players received varsity letters for their participation on the offensive unit of the 1969 Michigan football team. Players who were starters in the majority of Michigan's games are displayed in bold.

- Morris Abrahams, offensive tackle, senior, Ann Arbor, Michigan
- **Robert Baumgartner** (No. 60), offensive guard, senior, Chicago – started 9 games at offensive left guard
- William J. Berutti, quarterback, junior, Franklin, Ohio
- Jim Betts (No. 23), quarterback, junior, Cleveland, Ohio – started 1 game at left halfback
- Jim Brandstatter (No. 76), offensive tackle, sophomore, East Lansing, Michigan
- **Richard Caldarazzo** (No. 56), offensive guard, senior, Melrose Park, Illinois – started 8 games at offensive right guard
- **Garvie Craw** (No. 48), fullback, senior, Montclair, New Jersey – started 7 games at fullback and 3 games at right halfback
- **Dan Dierdorf** (No. 72), offensive tackle, junior, Canton, Ohio – started 7 games at offensive right tackle and 1 at offensive left tackle
- Glenn Doughty (No. 22), tailback, sophomore, Detroit – started 4 games at left halfback
- Eric Federico, fullback, senior, Trenton, Michigan
- **John H. Gabler** (No. 18), wingback, senior, Royal Oak, Michigan – started 3 games at fullback, 3 games at right halfback
- Werner W. Hall, offensive tackle, senior, Sandusky, Ohio
- Mike Hankwitz (No. 81), tight end, senior, Scottsville, Michigan – started 2 games at right end
- **Jack Harpring** (No. 71), offensive tackle, junior, Cincinnati, Ohio – started 8 games at offensive left tackle and 1 at offensive right tackle
- William J. Harris (No. 80), split end, junior, Mt. Clemens, Michigan
- Preston Henry (No. 44), tailback, sophomore, Flint, Michigan – started 2 games at right halfback
- Jerry Imsland, split end, senior, Northville, Michigan
- Timothy Killian (No. 57), center, junior, Lincoln Park, Michigan – started 2 games at center
- Joseph Lukz, offensive guard, senior, Niles, Ohio
- **Jim Mandich** (No. 88), tight end, senior, Solon, Ohio – started 8 games at left end
- Reggie McKenzie (No. 65), offensive guard, sophomore, Highland Park, Illinois
- **Don Moorhead** (No. 27), quarterback, junior, South Haven, Michigan – started all 11 games at quarterback
- **Guy Murdock** (No. 53), center, sophomore, Barrington, Illinois – started 7 games at center
- Michael Oldham (No. 84), split end, sophomore, Cincinnati, Ohio
- Robert Ritley, offensive tackle, senior, Garfield Heights, Ohio
- Peter C. Sarantos, center, senior, Elkhart, Indiana
- Lance G. Scheffler, tailback, junior, Trenton, Michigan
- Fritz Seyferth (No. 32), fullback, sophomore, Darien, Connecticut – started 1 game at fullback
- Paul Seymour (No. 85), split end, sophomore, Berkley, Michigan
- Paul Staroba (No. 30), wingback, junior, Flint, Michigan – started 3 games at right end
- Billy Taylor (No. 42), tailback, sophomore, Barberton, Ohio – started 3 games at left halfback
- Frank Titas (No. 64), offensive guard, senior, Cleveland, Ohio

=== Defensive letter winners ===
The following players received varsity letters for their participation on the defensive unit of the 1969 Michigan football team. Players who were starters in the majority of Michigan's games are displayed in bold.

- Tom Beckman, defensive tackle, sophomore, Chesaning, Michigan
- Richard W. Brown, middle guard, senior, Auburn, Michigan
- Al Carpenter, defensive end, sophomore, Flint, Michigan – started 1 game at offensive right guard
- Dana Coin, defensive end and place-kicker, sophomore, Pontiac, Michigan
- **Tom Curtis** (No. 25), defensive back, senior, Aurora, Ohio – started all 11 games at safety
- **Thom Darden** (No. 35), defensive back, sophomore, Sandusky, Ohio – started 10 games at wolfman (also started 1 game at left halfback on offense)
- Bruce Elliott, defensive back, sophomore, Indianapolis, Indiana – started 1 game at right halfback
- Alan Francis, middle guard, senior, Euclid, Ohio
- **Fred Grambau** (No. 92), defensive tackle, sophomore, Ossineke, Michigan – started all 11 games at left defensive tackle (also started 2 games at left tackle on offense)
- Frank Gusich, defensive back, sophomore, Garfield Heights, Ohio – started 1 game at wolfman
- **Brian Healy** (No. 24), defensive back, senior, Sandusky, Ohio – started all 11 games at defensive halfback (also started 2 games at right halfback on offense)
- **Henry Hill** (No. 39), middle guard, junior, Detroit – started all 11 games at middle guard (also started 2 games at left guard and 1 at right guard on offense)
- **Marty Huff** (No. 70), linebacker, junior, Toledo, Ohio – started all 11 games at linebacker (also started 2 games at right tackle and 1 at left halfback on offense)
- Joseph M. Jones, linebacker, senior, Evanston, Illinois
- **Mike Keller** (No. 90), defensive end, sophomore, Grand Rapids, Michigan – started all 11 games at left defensive end (also started 2 games at left end on offense)
- Richard McCoy, Jr., defensive tackle, junior, Alliance, Ohio
- **Edward M. Moore** (No. 97), linebacker, junior, Youngstown, Ohio – started 10 games at linebacker (also started 2 games at right end on offense)
- **Pete Newell** (No. 82), defensive tackle, junior, Park Ridge, Illinois – started all 11 games at right defensive tackle (also started 2 games at center and 1 at right tackle on offense)
- Daniel Parks, defensive tackle, junior, Birmingham, Michigan
- **Barry Pierson** (No. 29), defensive back, senior, St. Ignace, Michigan – started all 11 games at defensive halfback (also started 1 game at left halfback on offense)
- **Cecil Pryor** (No. 55), defensive end, senior, Corpus Christi, Texas – started all 11 games at right defensive end (also started 1 game at left end and 1 at right end on offense)
- Thomas Takach, defensive end, senior, Detroit
- Mike Taylor, linebacker, sophomore, Detroit – started 1 game at linebacker
- Timothy Wadhams, defensive back, senior, Ann Arbor, Michigan
- Mark Werner, defensive back, senior, Cincinnati, Ohio
- Robert E. White, defensive back, senior, Middleville, Michigan
- George Zuganellis, linebacker, senior, Chicago

=== Non-letter winners ===
- Thomas A. Huiskens, tight end, sophomore, Bay City, Michigan

=== Players in the NFL ===
The following players were claimed in the 1970 NFL draft.

Player	Position	Round	Pick	NFL Club
Jim Mandich	Tight end	2	29	Miami Dolphins
Cecil Pryor	Defensive end	5	120	Green Bay Packers
Barry Pierson	Defensive back	5	127	St. Louis Cardinals

Eighteen members of the 1969 team went on to play professional football. They are: Tom Beckman (St.Louis Cardinals, 1972, Memphis Grizzlies, 1974–1975), Tom Curtis (Baltimore Colts, 1970–1971), Thom Darden (Cleveland Browns, 1972–1981), Dan Dierdorf (St. Louis Cardinals, 1971–1983), Glenn Doughty (Baltimore Colts, 1972–1979), Fred Grambau (Hamilton Tiger-Cats and Montreal Alouettes); Marty Huff (San Francisco 49ers, 1972; Edmonton Eskimos, 1973; Charlotte Hornets, 1974–1975), Mike Keller (Dallas Cowboys, 1972), Jim Mandich (Miami Dolphins, 1970–1977; Pittsburgh Steelers, 1978), Reggie McKenzie (Buffalo Bills, 1972–1982; Seattle Seahawks, 1983–1984), Guy Murdock (Houston Oilers, 1974; Chicago Fire/Winds, 1974–1975), Pete Newell (BC Lions, 1971); Cecil Pryor (Memphis Southmen), Fritz Seyferth (Calgary Stampeders, 1972); Paul Seymour (Buffalo Bills, 1973–1977), Paul Staroba (Cleveland Browns, 1972; Green Bay Packers, 1973), Billy Taylor (Calgary Stampeders, 1972), and Mike Taylor (New York Jets, 1972–73). Mandich was the starting tight end for the unbeaten 1972 Miami Dolphins who won Super Bowl VII. Dierdorf would later be enshrined in the Pro Football Hall of Fame.

=== Coaching staff ===
- Head coach: Bo Schembechler
- Assistant coaches:

- Jim Young - defensive coordinator and linebackers coach
- Chuck Stobart - offensive backfield coach
- Jerry Hanlon - offensive line coach
- Dick Hunter - defensive backfield coach
- Frank Maloney - defensive line coach
- George Mans - receivers coach
- Gary Moeller - defensive ends coach
- Larry Smith - offensive interior line coach
- Louie Lee - freshman coach

- Trainer: Lindsy McLean
- Manager: Robert Kohn

== Statistics ==
=== Rushing ===
Player	Attempts	Net yards	Yards per attempt	Touchdowns
Billy Taylor	141	864	6.1	7
Glenn Doughty	150	732	4.9	4
Don Moorhead	170	625	3.7	9
Garvie Craw	117	344	2.9	12

=== Passing ===
Player	Attempts	Completions	Interceptions	Comp %	Yards	Yds/Comp	TD	Long
Don Moorhead	210	99	7	47.1	1261	12.7	6	22
Jim Betts	33	16	0	48.5	293	18.3	2	59

=== Receiving ===
Player	Receptions	Yards	Yds/Recp	TD	Long
Jim Mandich	51	676	13.3	3	32
Bill Harris	15	302	20.1	0	59
Mike Hankwitz	13	165	12.7	0	26
Paul Staroba	12	141	11.8	0	15

=== Kickoff returns ===
Player	Returns	Yards	Yds/Return	TD	Long
Glenn Doughty	10	199	19.9	0	31
Billy Taylor	5	109	21.8	0	44
Preston Henry	6	83	13.8	0	23

=== Punt returns ===
Player	Returns	Yards	Yds/Return	TD	Long
Barry Pierson	19	300	15.8	1	60
Marty Huff	1	31	31.0	1	31
Tom Curtis	11	21	1.9	0	12
