= Don Moorhead =

American gridiron football player (born 1948)

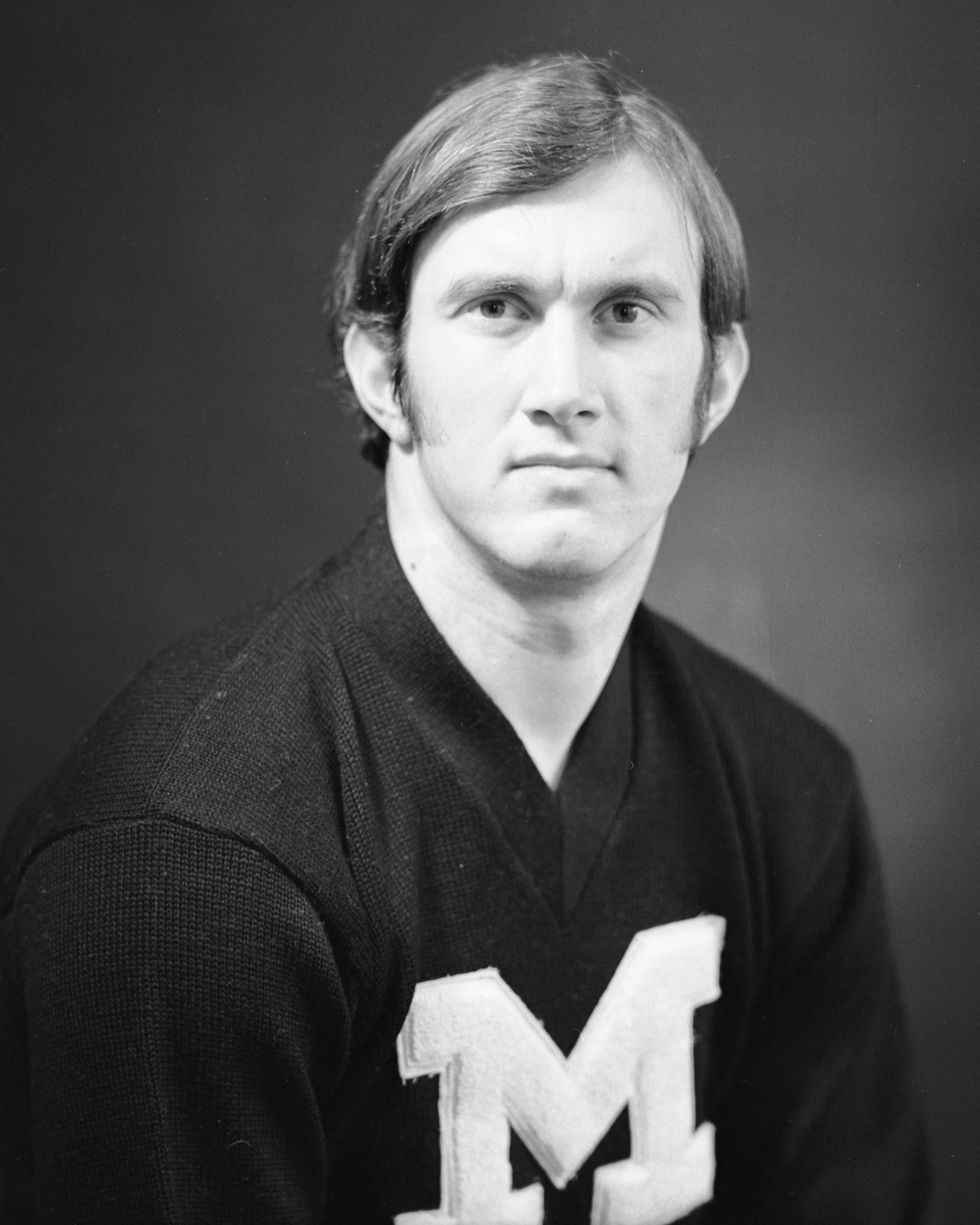
- Moorhead in 1970

Profile
- Position: Quarterback

Personal information
- Born: October 11, 1948 (age 78)

Career information
- College: Michigan
- NFL draft: 1971: 6th round, 132 (By the New Orleans Saints)th overall pick

Career history
- 1971–1975: BC Lions

Awards and highlights
- First-team All-Big Ten (1970)

Don Moorhead (born October 11, 1948) is a former Canadian Football League (CFL) quarterback. He was the starting quarterback for the BC Lions from 1971 to 1975 and for the Michigan Wolverines football team in 1969 and 1970. He set 24 football records at the University of Michigan, including most yards of total offense and most yards passing.

== Biography ==
=== Early life ===
Moorhead grew up in South Haven, Michigan where he was an All-State high school football player.

=== University of Michigan ===
==== Accomplishments and records ====
After graduating from high school, Moorhead enrolled at the University of Michigan. He was the starting quarterback for Bo Schembechler's Michigan Wolverines in all 21 games of the 1969 and 1970 seasons; he led the Wolverines to an overall record of 17–4 in his two seasons as quarterback. During his playing career at Michigan, Moorhead also broke Bob Chappuis's school record for total offense in a career with 3,641 yards of total offense. Moorhead set a total of 24 University of Michigan football records, including total offensive plays (706), most yards gained passing (2,550), most passes completed (200) and most passes attempted (423).

==== 1969 season ====
As a junior, Moorhead led the 1969 Wolverines team to an 8–2 regular season record, including a 24–12 win in the 1969 Ohio State game. He also led the 1969 Wolverines in total offense with 1,699 yards, 565 yards rushing and 1,134 yards passing. He completed 50 percent of his 178 passing attempts in 1969, threw five touchdown passes and had six passes intercepted. After the 1969 season, Schembechler called Moorhead "a very cool customer."

The Wolverines tied for the Big Ten Conference championship in 1969 and advanced to the 1970 Rose Bowl. Shortly before the game, Schembechler suffered a heart attack and was hospitalized. Moorhead said at the time, "I was shocked. It was like learning that your father was very ill." Moorhead led the Wolverines in the Rose Bowl against a USC Trojans team that included a defensive front five known as the "Wild Bunch." Charlie Weaver made a key play in the second quarter batting down a Moorhead pass to Jim Mandich who was open in the end zone. In all, the Wild Bunch knocked down four of Moorhead's passes. Moorhead was 14-for-32 in passing with one interception and 127 passing yards. USC won the game, 10–3. After the game, Moorhead expressed disappointment at not winning the game for the ailing Schembechler: "A couple of times in the huddle, guys would say 'get this one for Bo. He worked so hard to get us here.' But we weren't able to get it."

==== 1970 season ====
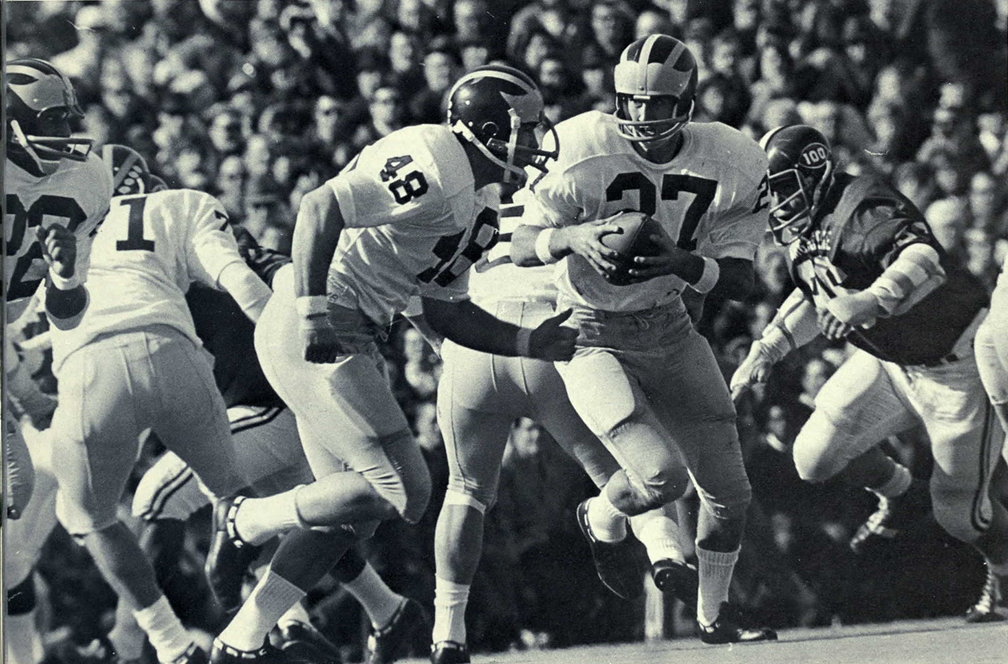
Moorhead (No. 27) from 1970 ''Michiganensian'' with Garvie Craw (No. 48)

Before the start of the 1970 football season, the Associated Press ran a feature story on Moorhead, writing that, "Anyone wishing to undermine the very capable 1970 Michigan team must simply figure a way to 'eliminate' quarterback Don Moorhead early in the season." Coach Schembechler lavished praise on Moorhead, calling him "a great football player" who knows the game and "can think out there." Schembechler added, "As long as Moorhead is whole, in my opinion, we have as good a quarterback as there is the country."

The 1970 Michigan team started the season with nine consecutive wins, outscoring opponents 279 to 70. Ranked #4 in the country, the Wolverines faced Ohio State in the final game of the season at Columbus. Ohio State defeated Michigan, 20–9, in Moorhead's final game in a Wolverines uniform. Moorhead was selected as an All-Big Ten Conference quarterback at the end of the 1970 season.

==== Career passing statistics ====
Season	Att	Comp	Int	Comp %	Yds	Yds/Comp	TD
1968	25	10	2	40.0	122	12.2	1
1969	210	99	7	47.1	1261	12.7	6
1970	190	87	6	45.8	1167	13.4	8
Career total	425	196	15	46.1	2550	13.0	15

==== Career rushing statistics ====
Season	Att	Yd+	Yd-	Net Yd	Yd/Att	TD
1968	16	106	8	98	6.1	0
1969	170	808	183	625	3.7	9
1970	97	431	63	368	3.8	2
Career total	283	1345	254	1091	3.9	11

=== BC Lions ===
Moorhead was drafted by the New Orleans Saints in the sixth round of the 1971 NFL draft, but the Saints also drafted Mississippi's Archie Manning the same year. The Saints intended to use Moorhead as a running back, but Moorhead wanted to play quarterback. In February 1971, Moorhead told a group in his home town, "The big deal is that I want to play quarterback. New Orleans drafted me as a running back, so you know that's what they're thinking." Determined to play quarterback, Moorhead elected instead to sign with the BC Lions in the Canadian Football League. In his first season, Moorhead split time behind incumbent starter Paul Brothers and backup Tom Wilkinson. After Brothers was traded to Ottawa and Wilkinson was released, he became the Lions' starting quarterback from 1972 to 1975 and led the team to the Grey Cup playoffs in 1973 and 1974. He lost is starting job to Peter Liske in 1975, after the Lions obtained Liske from Calgary in a trade. He announced his retirement from football in July 1976 after undergoing three knee operations in two years and tearing the biceps on his left arm. At the time of his retirement, Moorhead said, "Football was good to me. It gave me lots of things, but I may pay for it in later years with my injuries. I didn't set the world on fire, but I did have good years at British Columbia."

==== Career passing statistics ====
Season	Att	Comp	Int	Comp %	Yds	Yds/Comp	TD
1971	182	98	13	53.8	1302	13.8	9
1972	326	159	17	48.7	2606	16.3	10
1973	278	160	12	57.8	2005	12.5	4
1974	306	160	13	52.8	2478	15.5	17
1975	42	25	3	59.3	298	11.9	2

=== After football ===
When he retired from football, Moorhead became a physical education teacher at Paw Paw High School in Paw Paw, Michigan, retiring in 2010.
