= Jim Betts =

Jim Betts may refer to:

- Jim Betts (politician) (born c. 1932), former member of the Ohio House of Representatives
- Jim Betts (American football) (born 1949), former American football player, university administrator, and business executive
