= Cecil Pryor =

American gridiron football player (1947–2005)

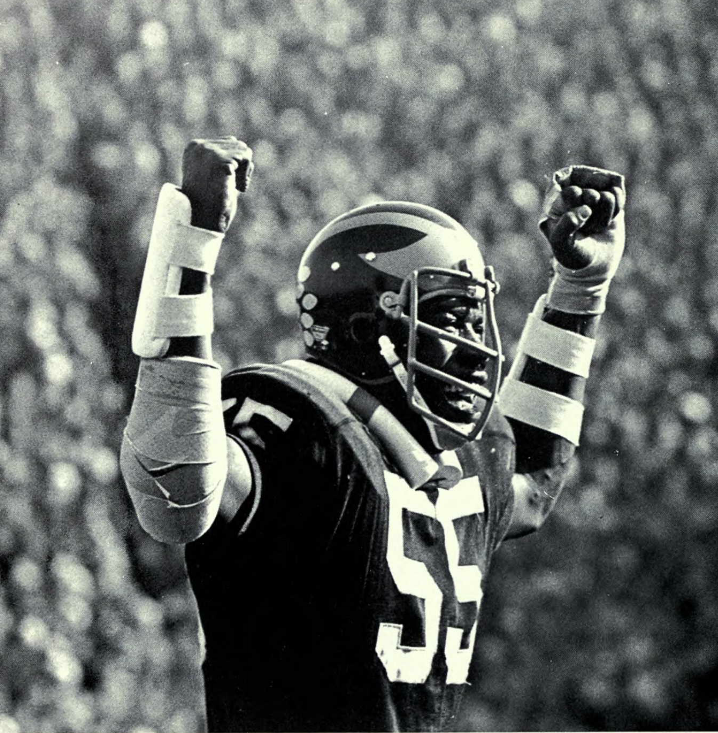

Profile
- Position: Defensive end

Personal information
- Born: October 7, 1947; Nueces County, Texas, U.S.
- Died: September 13, 2005 (aged 57); Ann Arbor, Michigan, U.S.

Career information
- College: Michigan
- NFL draft: 1970: 5th round, 120th overall pick

Career history
- Montreal Alouettes (1973); Memphis Grizzlies (1974–1975)

Awards and highlights
- Second-team All-Big Ten (1969)

Cecil Lemuel Pryor, Jr. (October 7, 1947 – September 13, 2005) was an American football player. He played professional football for the Montreal Alouettes of the Canadian Football League (CFL) in 1973 and for the Memphis Grizzlies of the World Football League (WFL) from 1974 to 1975. He played college football at the University of Michigan from 1967 to 1969.

== Early years & Education ==
Cecil Pryor was born in Nueces County, Texas, in 1947, the son of Cecil L. Pryor, Sr., and Fannie McCuller. He was the eldest of four children including his brother, Rundy Pryor and his two sisters, Leah Pryor and Barbara Pryor (Tatum). He was raised in Corpus Christi, Texas, and attended King High School. The major schools in Texas did not recruit African-American players at the time, and Pryor opted instead to play football at the University of Michigan, where a former coach Y C McNease had become an assistant coach under Bump Elliott.

== Michigan ==
He played for the Michigan Wolverines football team from 1967 to 1969. He was recruited as a quarterback, but began his collegiate career as a linebacker for the 1967 Michigan Wolverines football team. As a junior, he started eight games at defensive right end and one at offensive right end for the last Michigan football team coached by Bump Elliott.

Bo Schembechler took over as Michigan's head coach for Pryor's senior season. Pryor started all 11 games at right defensive end for the 1969 Michigan Wolverines football team and also started two games at the end position on offense. He played in the 1969 Michigan vs. Ohio State football game, considered one of the biggest upsets in college football history. The unranked Wolverines defeated the No. 1 Buckeyes by a 24-12 score. The day before the game, a fight broke out between players from the two teams as they passed each other in the tunnel at Michigan Stadium. Schembechler and Woody Hayes separated the players, and Schembechler later wrote that he knew his players no longer feared the Buckeyes when he heard Cecil Pryor yell, "And we're gonna kick your ass tomorrow, too!" Pryor proved to be one of the defensive standouts of the game. Sports Illustrated noted at the time: "The Wolverines' ends, [Mike] Keller and Cecil Pryor, kept [Rex] Kern so well contained that he gained only 28 yards in 11 runs after his initial 25-yard effort." Pryor also recovered an Ohio State fumble in the final minute to seal the victory. Interviewed in 1993, Pryor recalled, "That was probably the greatest game I ever participated in my life, and I had been playing since the fourth grade."

With the victory over Ohio State, Michigan won the Big Ten Conference's spot in the 1970 Rose Bowl. Pryor showed his sense of humor in the pregame introductions for the Rose Bowl. Teammate Jim Brandstatter recalled, "When it was Cecil's time for his intro, he looked directly into the camera, and with a serious, professorial scowl said, 'Cecil Pryor, defensive end, Corpus Christi, Texas, senior, majoring in nuclear physics.'" According to Brandstatter, "Cecil hadn't been anywhere near the physics building in his four years at Michigan." On the field, the team learned shortly before the game that coach Schembechler had suffered a heart attack the night before the game and was in the hospital. The team was reported to be "an emotional wreck", with Pryor crying at the news. Playing in his final game for Michigan, Pryor led the team with 15 tackles, but the Wolverines's offense was unable to get on track, and Michigan lost by a score of 10–3. After the game, a writer in The Michigan Daily wrote that the Pryor had been accused of "dogging it" in the past, but not against USC: "His detractors should have seen him in the Rose Bowl. Putting his awesome physical talents to use Pryor was a demon on defense."

Pryor was selected in 1969 as a second-team All-Big Ten Conference player. He was also selected to play in the 10th annual Coaches All-American football game in June 1970. During his collegiate career at Michigan, Pryor totaled 106 tackles, nine tackles for loss, three pass breakups and four fumble recoveries.

== Professional football ==
Pryor was drafted in the fifth round of the 1970 NFL draft by the Green Bay Packers. He was cut by the Packers in early September 1970 before the opening of the 1970 NFL season. He also tried out with, and was cut by, the Philadelphia Eagles.

In 1971, Pryor attended pre-season camp with the New York Giants, but he was cut by the team in August. He joined the Chicago Bears in 1972 and remained with the team through the pre-season. However, he was cut in early September 1972.

In May 1973, he signed to play for the Montreal Alouettes in the Canadian Football League. He played for the Alouettes under head coach Marv Levy as part of the team's starting front four during the 1973 CFL season. He sustained a cheek injury in a game against Ottawa and was waived through the league and dropped in early September 1973.

Pryor played with the Memphis Grizzlies of the World Football League during the 1974 and 1975 seasons.

== Later life ==
After retiring from football, Pryor returned to Ann Arbor to complete his degree. He operated a leasing equipment company for 10 years, building it into "one of the most successful minority-owned companies in the state." He entered the Ford Motor Company dealer training program in the 1990s and purchased a dealership in Jackson, Michigan. Pryor was a co-owner of Jackson Ford for over 10 years. He also served on the University of Michigan's Board in Control of Intercollegiate Athletics for 12 years.

== Death ==
Pryor was married to Jan Pryor, and they had three daughters, Melissa, Cecilia, and Hillary. Pryor died in September 2005 at the University of Michigan Hospital. He was 57 years old.
