= 1969 Ohio State vs. Michigan football game =

The Start of The Ten Year War
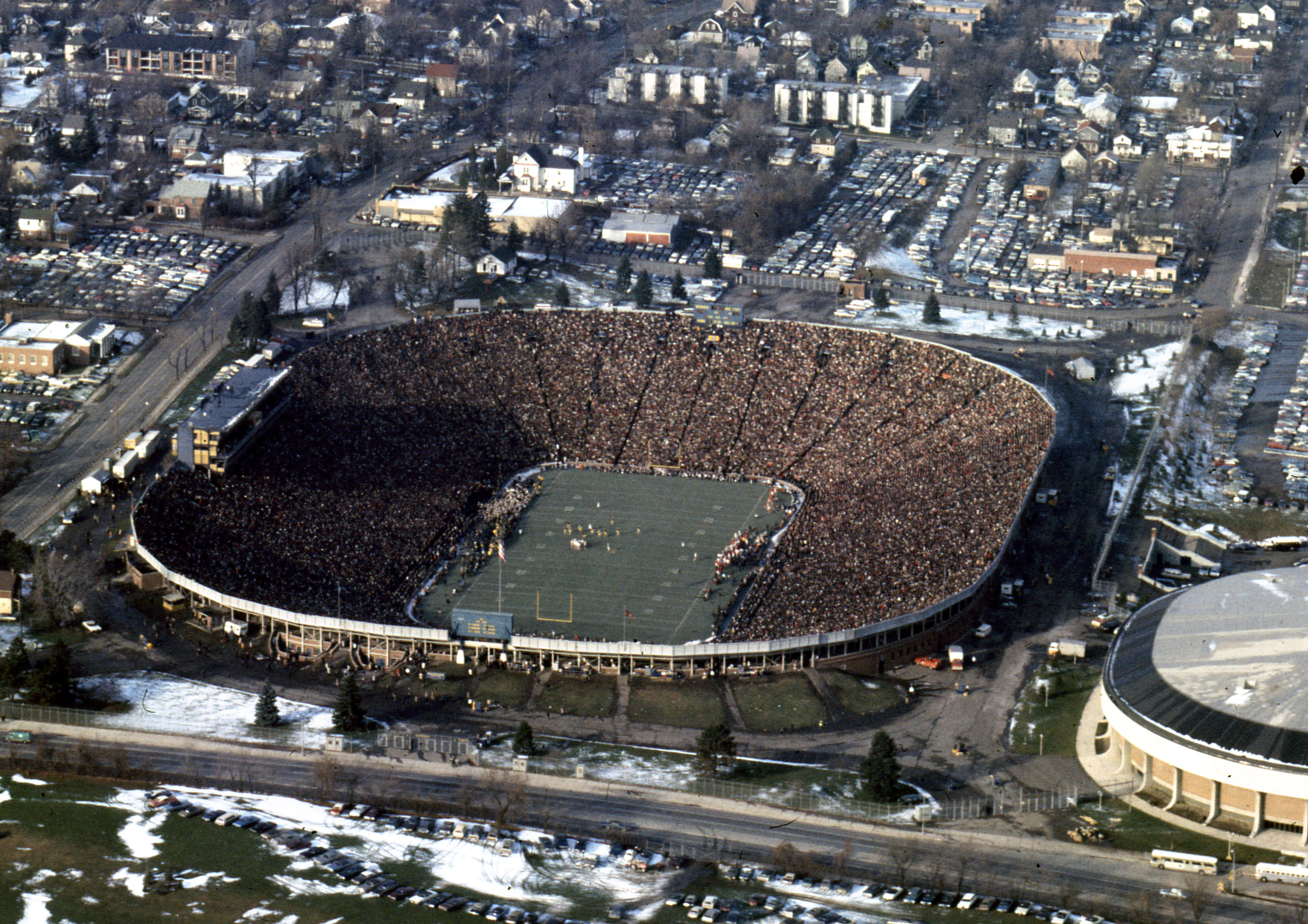
- Aerial view of Michigan Stadium during the game
| Ohio State Buckeyes | Michigan Wolverines |
| (8–0) | (7–2) |
| 12 | 24 |
| Head coach: Woody Hayes | Head coach: Bo Schembechler |
| AP / Coaches; 1 / 1 | AP / Coaches; 12 / 12 |
| | 1 | 2 | 3 | 4 | Total |
|---|---|---|---|---|---|
| Ohio State | 6 | 6 | 0 | 0 | 12 |
| Michigan | 7 | 17 | 0 | 0 | 24 |
- Date: November 22, 1969
- Season: 1969
- Stadium: Michigan Stadium
- Location: Ann Arbor, Michigan
- National anthem: Michigan Marching Band
- Referee: Jerry Markbreit
- Halftime show: Michigan Marching Band
- Attendance: 103,588

United States TV coverage
- Network: ABC
- Announcers: Bill Flemming and Lee Grosscup

The 1969 Ohio State vs. Michigan football game is considered to be one of the best-known games of the series, as well as one of the biggest upsets in college football history. The Buckeyes went into the game as the top-ranked team in the country, with a 22-game winning streak under the direction of head coach Woody Hayes. They were also defending national champions. The Wolverines went into the game under a new head coach, Bo Schembechler, who was trying to redefine a college football power that had fallen on hard times. Ohio State was playing for its second straight national title, while Michigan was playing for the Rose Bowl, and the championship of the Big Ten Conference was on the line. The game was witnessed by a (then) stadium-record crowd of 103,588 at Michigan Stadium in Ann Arbor, and began the highly combative stretch of the rivalry informally known as The Ten Year War.

== Background ==
Throughout the entire 1969 NCAA University Division football season, Ohio State had been ranked #1 by the AP poll. Ohio State's 1969 football team was dubbed by the media as the "greatest college football team of all time", with a handful of proven All-Big Ten players and All-Americans, such as quarterback Rex Kern, running backs Larry Zelina, Jim Otis and John Brockington, wide receivers Jan White and Bruce Jankowski, middle guard Jim Stillwagon and defensive back Jack Tatum. Three Buckeye players, including Kern, Otis, and Tatum finished in the top ten of the Heisman Trophy voting in 1969. Leading up to the Buckeyes' meeting with Michigan, Ohio State had never trailed at any point during the 1969 season, and no team had scored more than 21 points on them all season (Michigan State in a 54–21 loss). In addition, Ohio State had not scored less than 34 points in any game and their closest margin of victory was 27 points in a 34–7 win over Minnesota.

Michigan was in the process of rebuilding after a period of mediocrity that saw them win only one Big Ten championship between 1951 and 1968; the program, known for the winning traditions under Fielding H. Yost and Fritz Crisler, had seemingly lost its way. Schembechler was hired before the 1969 season, after six successful seasons as head coach of his alma mater, Miami University of Ohio, where he'd won two MAC titles. But the team began the season with an unimpressive 3–2 record, including a loss to in-state rival Michigan State and the eventual Big Eight co-champion Missouri. But they did get a key 30–21 win vs. #9 Purdue on Oct. 11; had Michigan lost, Purdue would have gone to the Rose Bowl (Ohio State could not go due to the Big Ten's "no repeat" rule) regardless of the outcome of the Ohio State game. Michigan would win their next four games, with a team including quarterback Don Moorhead, fullback Garvie Craw, wingback John Gabler, tailbacks Glenn Doughty and Billy Taylor, offensive lineman Dan Dierdorf and defensive stars Barry Pierson, Thom Darden, Cecil Pryor and Henry Hill.

When Schembechler was hired, he set the team goal – beat Ohio State. One advantage Schembechler had was that he had played for Woody Hayes at Miami (Ohio), then coached under him at Ohio State, so he patterned his team after Hayes' 1969 behemoth. There was also a revenge factor from the 1968 game when Ohio State trounced Michigan 50–14, including going for two after their last touchdown in the game's final moments. When asked why he did so after the game, Hayes replied, "Because I couldn't go for three!"

Ohio State was favored by 17 points going into Michigan Stadium on November 22. Due to the Big Ten's "no repeat" rule in effect at the time, the Buckeyes knew a victory would give them their second consecutive national championship because they could not go to a bowl game. Michigan was playing for a share of the conference championship. To motivate his team, Schembechler had the number 50 (for the 50 points Ohio State scored against the Wolverines the year before) displayed everywhere in the Michigan locker room, and taped to every player's practice uniform. In addition, Schembechler said that if Michigan lost, they would not accept the Rose Bowl berth they had essentially clinched because of the "no repeat" rule.

== The Game ==
=== Summary ===
All of the scoring took place in the first half. After unsuccessful opening possessions the two teams exchanged touchdowns on four consecutive drives to make the score 14–12 Michigan. Michigan added a touchdown following a momentous punt return and a field goal on its subsequent possession for the halftime (and eventual final) score of 24–12.

The Michigan touchdowns came on a ten-play drive, after a key 28-yard run by Billy Taylor, and on a drive keyed by a punt-return inside the OSU 5 by Barry Pierson. Pierson also made his mark on defense, accounting for three of the six interceptions by the Michigan defense.

=== First half ===
Ohio State appeared to take control of the game right from the opening kickoff, when Rex Kern kept the ball and ran for 25 yards on the first play from scrimmage. Jim Otis carried the next three plays for another first down. The Buckeyes got the ball to the Michigan 11, when the Wolverine defense ended the drive on a fourth down-and-two to take over. Michigan failed to get a first down, and the Buckeyes got the ball back and got on the scoreboard first, on a 1-yard touchdown run by Otis. A missed extra-point left the score 6–0 in favor of the scarlet-and-gray.

Glenn Doughty returned the kickoff to the Michigan 44, and Don Moorhead led a drive downfield, primarily getting the ball to tight end and captain Jim Mandich. Once Michigan got the ball to the Ohio State 3, Schembechler called a basic off-tackle play, and Garvie Craw scored to tie it up. The Frank Titus extra point put Michigan ahead 7–6. This would be the first time since the second quarter of the 1969 Rose Bowl that Ohio State had trailed.

Ohio State shook the score off and began a drive that carried over into the second quarter. Kern led the Buckeyes downfield again, hitting Larry Zelina and Jan White, who scored and put Ohio State up 12–7. The extra-point was kicked, but Michigan was called for offsides, and Hayes tried for a two-point conversion, which failed.

Michigan started the next possession at their own 33. Once they reached the Ohio State 33, Michigan ran a tailback draw, and Billy Taylor gained 28 yards to the Buckeye 5. Two plays later, Craw punched it into the end zone to put Michigan ahead 14–12.

After Ohio State went three-and-out on their next possession, punter Mike Sensibaugh kicked to Michigan's Barry Pierson, who began his career game by returning the punt all the way to the Buckeye 3-yard line, sending Michigan Stadium into delirium. Morehead scored two plays later on an option play, and it was 21–12 in favor of the maize-and-blue.

The Buckeyes got the ball going again, but their next possession ended on the Wolverine 36 following a Wolverine sack of Kern. Michigan drove down the field again and Schembechler went for it on a fourth-and-three on the Ohio State 3. Morehead tossed to Mandich for a touchdown, but it was called back on an illegal procedure penalty. Tim Killian kicked the field goal to put Michigan up at the half 24–12. For the first time since October 28, 1967, Ohio State trailed at halftime.

=== Second half ===
The Wolverines got the ball to start the third quarter and began racking up more first downs, only to have the drive end on the Ohio State 30. Killian missed a 47-yard field goal and Ohio State took over, only to have a Kern pass picked off by Pierson. Michigan went three-and-out and missed another field goal. In what became a refrain throughout the second half, another Ohio State pass was picked off, with a third-down pass intercepted again by Pierson, who this time returned it to the Buckeye 35. Killian missed another field goal try.

As the fourth quarter got underway, Hayes realized that his offense needed to play more aggressive and not punt the ball back to Michigan after each possession. Kern was tackled for a loss on the Buckeyes' first drive of the quarter, on fourth down. Michigan got the ball back at the Ohio State 40, and Michigan continued to churn out the yards, getting the ball to the Buckeye 10. Craw went for it on fourth-and-one and failed, keeping Ohio State in the game. But the Buckeyes' offense went three-and-out, then Michigan drove the ball again to the Buckeye red zone. Craw tried to get a first down again and was once again rebuffed.

Hayes pulled Kern out of the game and went with his backup at quarterback, Ron Maciejowski. Maciejowski was able to get a first down, but then threw a pass intercepted again by Pierson, his third of the game. Yet another Wolverine possession was stopped, and Killian missed another field goal try.

The Buckeyes tried one last-ditch effort to pull within Michigan with 3:12 left in the game, with Maciejowski finding Dick Kuhn. Hayes called a fake punt with Sensibaugh throwing to Zelina to get the first down at their own 38. Kuhn then took another pass in Michigan territory, then Maciejowski threw to Ray Gillian at the Michigan 22. The drive was squashed on the next play when Maciejowski threw an interception to Thom Darden.

The Michigan Stadium crowd, sensing a major upset, began screaming and chanting. Michigan tried to run down the clock, but Ohio State stalled with timeouts and got the ball back after a Wolverine punt. With 29 seconds left, Maciejowski fumbled the ball, and it was recovered by Cecil Pryor. The Buckeyes had committed an unheard-of seven turnovers on the day, six interceptions and a fumble. Moorhead took a knee as the crowd counted down the final seconds, then rushed the field in ecstasy. ABC play-by-play announcer Bill Flemming exclaimed, "There it is! What has to be the upset of the century!" Schembechler was carried off on players' shoulders (he was accidentally dropped, but Bo noted "it was the only thing [they] fumbled all day."), and Jim Mandich was seen being carried, with tears of joy streaming down his cheeks.
