= 1978 Peach Bowl =

American college football game

- 11th Peach Bowl
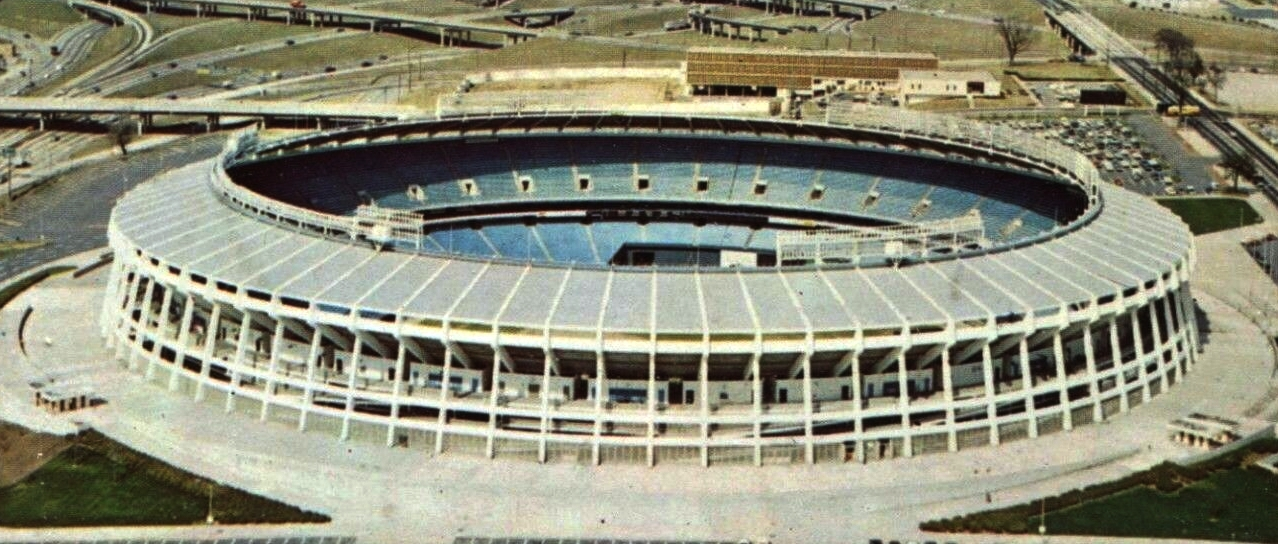
- Atlanta–Fulton County Stadium in Atlanta, Georgia, hosted the Peach Bowl.
Purdue Boilermakers	Georgia Tech Yellow Jackets
(8–2–1)	(7–4)
Big Ten	Independent
41	21
Head coach: Jim Young	Head coach: Pepper Rodgers
AP / Coaches; 17 / 17	AP / Coaches; NR / 19
	1	2	3	4	Total
Purdue	21	13	0	7	41
Georgia Tech	0	7	0	14	21
- Date: December 25, 1978
- Season: 1978
- Stadium: Atlanta–Fulton County Stadium
- Location: Atlanta, Georgia
- MVP: QB Mark Herrmann; DT Calvin Clark
- Referee: Alfred DiStaola (ECAC)
- Attendance: 20,277

United States TV coverage
- Network: CBS
- Announcers: Lindsey Nelson; Paul Hornung

The 1978 Peach Bowl was a college football postseason bowl game between the Purdue Boilermakers and the Georgia Tech Yellow Jackets.

== Background ==
Purdue finished 2nd in the Big Ten Conference, in their first bowl game since 1967. Georgia Tech was in their first bowl game since 1972. Due to the game being played on Christmas Day, a ticket drive had to be set up by Rodgers' wife.

== Game summary ==
Purdue took the lead with 10:40 in the first quarter and scored twice more in the next four minutes. Georgia Tech did not score until 9:35 remained in the half, after they trailed 28-0. Georgia Tech scored twice with less than three minutes remaining to narrow the lead from 41-7 to 41-21, but the game had already been decided. Quarterback Mark Herrmann threw 12-of-24 for two touchdowns (and two interceptions) and rushed for one more in a convincing 41-21 victory over Georgia Tech. Purdue's defense forced two first-half turnovers. This was the second 9-win season in Purdue history.

=== First Quarter ===
- Purdue: Jones 3-yard run (Sovereen kick), 10:40
- Purdue: Jones 8-yard run (Sovereen kick), 9:47
- Purdue: Smith 10-yard pass from Herrmann (Sovereen kick), 6:04

=== Second Quarter ===
- Purdue: Herrmann 2-yard run (Sovereen kick), 13:04
- Georgia Tech: Lee 1-yard run (Smith kick), 9:35
- Purdue: Macon 1-yard run (kick failed), 3:58

=== Fourth Quarter ===
- Purdue: Burrell 12-yard pass from Herrmann (Sovereen kick), 12:38
- Georgia Tech: Moore 3-yard pass from Kelley (Hill run), 2:40
- Georgia Tech: Hill 31-yard pass from Kelley (pass failed), 1:15

== Aftermath ==
Purdue won two more bowl games before Young's departure in 1981. Georgia Tech waited until 1985 to make their next bowl appearance.

== Statistics ==
Statistics	Purdue	Georgia Tech
First downs	24	14
Net yards rushing	157	12
Net yards passing	166	168
Interceptions	2	2
Total yards	323	180
Punts	5-36.6	7-36.7
Penalties	9-78	5-48
Fumbles lost	1	2
