= Glenn Doughty =

American football player (born 1951)

- Doughty in 1977

No. 35
- Position: Wide receiver

Personal information
- Born: January 30, 1951 (age 75); Detroit, Michigan, U.S.
- Listed height: 6 ft 2 in (1.88 m)
- Listed weight: 204 lb (93 kg)

Career information
- High school: Pershing (Detroit)
- College: Michigan
- NFL draft: 1972: 2nd round, 47th overall pick

Career history
- Baltimore Colts (1972–1979)

Awards and highlights
- Second-team All-Big Ten (1971)

Career NFL statistics
- Games played: 103
- Starts: 97
- Receptions: 219
- Receiving yards: 3,547 (16.2 average)
- Receiving TDs: 24
- Stats at Pro Football Reference

Glenn Martin "Shake and Bake" Doughty (/ˈdaʊti/ DOW-tee; born January 30, 1951) is an American former professional football player in the National Football League (NFL). He played college football as a tailback and wingback for the Michigan Wolverines from 1969 to 1971 and had an eight-year career in professional football as a wide receiver for the Baltimore Colts from 1972 to 1979.

In 1982, Doughty built Baltimore's Shake & Bake Family Fun Center, a community recreation center including a bowling alley and roller rink. In 1994, he co-founded Career Information & Training Network (CITN), a St. Louis based company that produces videos designed to show positive multicultural career role models for use in K-12 schools, colleges and corporate America.

== Early life ==
Doughty was born in Detroit, Michigan, in 1951. He attended Pershing High School. Doughty was the son of Otis and Bessie Doughty. Following Otis Doughty's military service, he moved his family to Detroit. Doughty played youth football as a back for the East Detroit Shamrocks and led the team to its first undefeated season. Doughty and Ron Banks were the first African Americans to play for the team. Banks became the founding member of the singing group The Dramatics.

In 1965, at age 14, Doughty became a starting defensive end for the Pershing High School football team. As a senior, Doughty was captain of the 6-0 undefeated champion Pershing team and earned Eastside Detroit MVP honors and The Detroit News all-city and all-state honors. Doughty was a member of the 1967 Pershing basketball team that was coached by Hall of Fame coach Will Robinson. The team featured five players who went on to careers in pro sports: Doughty; Spencer Haywood (NBA Hall of Fame); Ralph Simpson (Denver Nugetts); Marvin Lane (Detroit Tigers); and Paul Seal (NFL). The Detroit Free Press named this team number 1 in the history of Michigan basketball.

Doughty also led the Pershing baseball team to an Eastside Detroit baseball championship with a .427 batting average.

== University of Michigan ==
Doughty played tailback and wingback for the University of Michigan from 1969 to 1971. He gained 2,347 all-purpose yards for the Wolverines, including 1,464 rushing yards, 518 receiving yards, and 365 yards on kickoff returns. Doughty earned freshman of the year honors by winning the John Maulbetsch award.

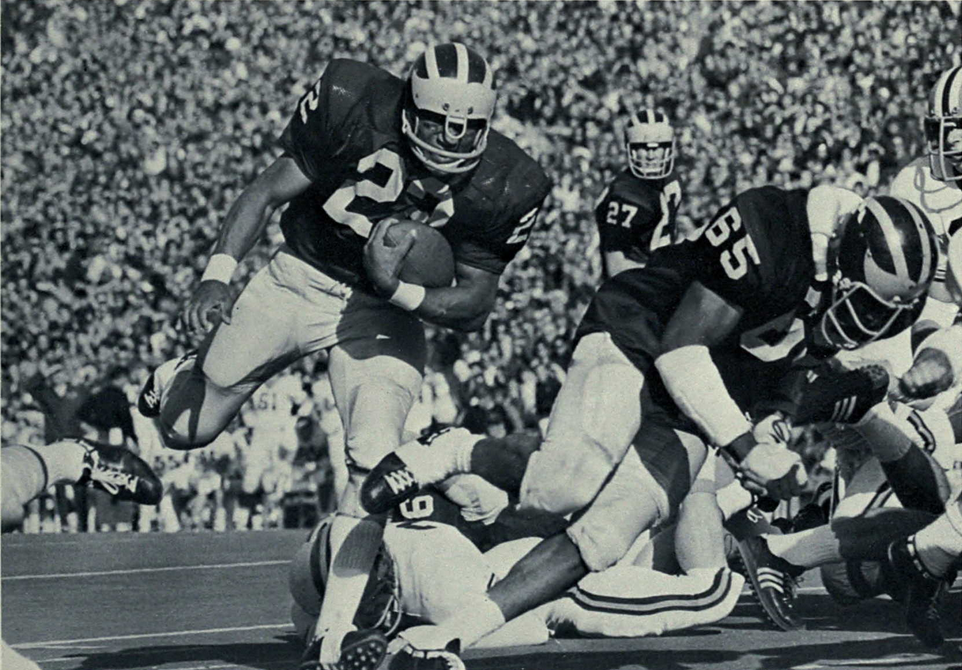
Doughty (No. 22) and Reggie McKenzie as Wolverines in 1971.

Doughty made his debut for Michigan under first-year head coach Bo Schembechler in 1969.

The Bleacher Report's story "The Mellow Men of Michigan: Bo Schembechler's Gridiron Sons" traces the origins of Doughty and his six groundbreaking Wolverine classmates Billy Taylor, Reggie McKenzie, Thom Darden, Butch Carpenter, Mike Taylor and Mike Oldham. In 1968, these young men became the largest group of African American athletes on scholarship in Michigan history. In Doughty's first two games for Michigan (also Schembechler's first two games as Michigan's head coach), he rushed for 138 yards (including an 80-yard touchdown run on his first carry) in a 42–14 win against Vanderbilt and 191 yards in a 45–7 win against Washington.

Doughty sustained injuries early in the season that slowed him down and allowed Billy Taylor to move from backup to starting tailback. Doughty did rush for 100 yards one more time during the 1969 season, in a 51–6 win against Iowa. He totaled 732 yards for the 1969 Michigan Wolverines football team that after defeating Ohio State 24-12 were crowned Big Ten Co-Champions with the Buckeyes. Doughty sustained an injury on Christmas Day while practicing for the 1970 Rose Bowl. Doughty was moved to the wingback position and started all 12 games at that position for the 1970 and 1971 Michigan Wolverines football team. He scored three touchdowns in a 35–6 victory over Illinois in October 1971.

The 11-0 Michigan two time Big Ten Champion team earned Bo his second trip to the Rose Bowl. After the 1971 season, Doughty was selected by UPI as a second-team wide receiver on the 1971 All-Big Ten Conference football team. Doughty was selected to play on the 1972 Coaches All American and College All Star Team as the starting wide receiver.

Doughty graduated from Michigan in 1972 with a bachelor of science degree in education.

== Professional football ==
Doughty played professional football as wide receiver for the Baltimore Colts from 1972 to 1979. In the 1972 NFL draft, Doughty was selected as a wide receiver in the second round by the Baltimore Colts. Doughty got his first start mid season vs the Cowboys catching his first three passes from Hall of Fame QB Johnny Unitas. In 1973 he was named Colts Offensive Player of the year leading the AFC with 23 yards per catch. He appeared in 103 games for the Colts, totaling 219 receptions for 3,547 yards and 24 touchdowns. He originated the athletic movement and nickname "Shake and Bake" during his years with the Colts, and the nickname was also extended to the 1975 Baltimore Colts offense. The Eastern Division Champion Colts 10-4 record was the greatest NFL turn around season in history after going 2-12 in 1974. Doughty led the team in receiving yardage with 666 yards. Doughty helped lead the Colts for the first time in the team's history to three straight Eastern Divisional Championships 1975-1977. In his first playoff game Doughty scored the only Colts touchdown and led the Colts in receiving yards with 63 in their loss to the 1974 Super Bowl Champion Pittsburgh Steelers 24-10.

In 1975 Doughty formed the Colts Shake and Bake Band. The group featured Doughty on congas (and lyrics)and teammates Raymond Chester on bass, Lloyd Mumford on harmonica, Fred Scott on percussion, Bruce Barnett on drums. The group made two records Shake & Bake Parts I & II and Starflight Disco. Their music was aired on local radio stations and played live at area clubs.

In 1979, Doughty left the team for two days claiming that he was being subtly downgraded by Colts' coach Ted Marchibroda. The Baltimore Afro-American referred to the Colts' treatment of Doughty as "business as usual at Memorial Stadium," noting that Raymond Chester had complained the prior year that "an attitude of racism" on the Colts caused quarterback Bert Jones to "look away" from him. Doughty was cut by the Colts in August 1980 after struggling during the pre-season with a hamstring pull. His 16.2 yards per catch ranks 98 in the NFL all-time top 100. He was the sixth leading receiver in Colts' history when his NFL career ended.

== NFL career statistics ==
Legend
**Bold**	Career high

=== Regular season ===
Year	Team	Games		Receiving				
Year	Team	GP	GS	Rec	Yds	Avg	Lng	TD
1972	BAL	5	0	3	31	10.3	19	0
1973	BAL	14	14	25	587	**23.5**	**66**	4
1974	BAL	13	12	24	300	12.5	27	2
1975	BAL	14	14	39	**666**	17.1	63	4
1976	BAL	14	14	**40**	628	15.7	41	**5**
1977	BAL	13	13	28	435	15.5	57	4
1978	BAL	**15**	**15**	25	390	15.6	46	3
1979	BAL	**15**	**15**	35	510	14.6	54	2
		103	97	219	3,547	16.2	66	24

=== Playoffs ===
Year	Team	Games		Receiving				
Year	Team	GP	GS	Rec	Yds	Avg	Lng	TD
1975	BAL	**1**	**1**	**2**	**63**	**31.5**	**58**	**1**
1976	BAL	**1**	**1**	1	25	25.0	25	0
1977	BAL	**1**	**1**	1	20	20.0	20	0
		3	3	4	108	27.0	58	1

== Shake and Bake Family Fun Center ==
After retiring from the Colts, Doughty announced plans to build the Shake and Bake Family Recreation Center in the Upton neighborhood of Baltimore. The project was supported by a $3.5 million loan from the City of Baltimore. Disputes over financing jeopardized the project in 1982, and disputes with construction workers also drew press coverage. The project was ultimately built with $4.7 million in development loans from the City of Baltimore, $150,000 invested by Doughty, and $1.2 million invested by four limited partners.

When the project, renamed the Shake and Bake Family Fun Center, opened in October 1982 managed by Doughty came in on time and under budget, Doughty called it a dream come true and "my Super Bowl ring". The $5.2 million project was described by the Baltimore Afro-American as "Doughty's gift to the inner city." The 70,000-square-foot (6,500 m^{2}) structure included a 40-lane bowling alley, a 22,000-square-foot (2,000 m^{2}) roller-skating rink, a sporting goods store, an "electronic game arcade," and two fast-food restaurants. In February 1984, Black Enterprise magazine wrote a story on the center, noting that the center had grossed $1 million in its first year and received 10,000 visits per week. The article concluded: "The complex is such a success that mayors from large cities around the U.S., studying inner city revitalization programs, have visited it." The Baltimore Magazine March 2018 story on Shake and Bake wrote: In 1984, Doughty invited his hero Muhammad Ali into paying a visit, filling not just the roller rink and bowling alley, but quite a bit of Pennsylvania Avenue outside, too.

In January 1985, shootings at the center and financial difficulties drew negative press to the project. After loan delinquencies mounted in 1987 Doughty and his limited partners sold the facility to the City. . In 2017 Shake and Bake was featured in "Baltimore: The Rise of Charm City" a radio series by WEAA of Morgan State University that described Shake and Bake as "one of Baltimore's iconic structures that was built by African Americans and founded by Glenn Doughty". Over one million patrons have passed through the center over the thirty years of operation.

On March 23, 2018 Mayor Cathy Pugh and Doughty joined together with state dignitaries and citizens from the Upton neighborhood celebrated the grand reopening of Shake and Bake. The theme was "The Bake is Back". The city of Baltimore and the state of Maryland committed nearly $5 million in new funding to upgrade the center.

== Personal life ==
In 1985, Doughty moved with his family to St. Louis, Missouri. He co-founded a company called Takeoff Video Educational Excellence. The company produced videos designed to show positive multicultural role models for use in schools. In 1994, Takeoff was reorganized as Career Information Training Network. Doughty is the company's CEO.

In 1972 Glenn married Janice "Jay" Woods. They have two children Derek and Nikedra and were married for 33 years before Jay died in 2005. In 2013 Glenn met Jody Auletta. Jody died in March 2023. Glenn is retired and still resides in St. Louis.
