= Tom Curtis (American football) =

American football player (born 1947)

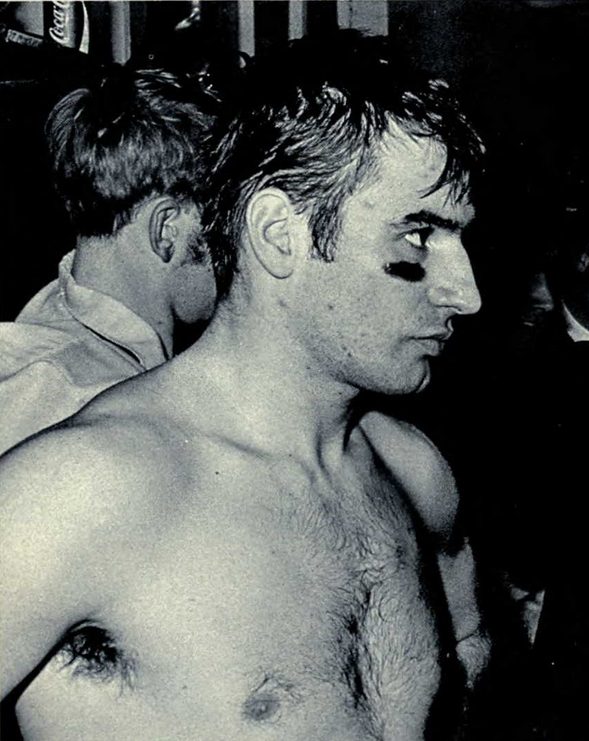
- Curtis interviewed after the 1969 Michigan-Ohio State game

No. 25
- Position: Safety

Personal information
- Born: November 1, 1947 (age 79); Cleveland, Ohio, U.S.
- Listed height: 6 ft 1 in (1.85 m)
- Listed weight: 196 lb (89 kg)

Career information
- High school: Aurora (Aurora, Ohio)
- College: Michigan
- NFL draft: 1970: 14th round, 356th overall pick

Career history
- Baltimore Colts (1970–1971)

Awards and highlights
- Super Bowl champion (V); Consensus All-American (1969); Second-team All-American (1968); 2× First-team All-Big Ten (1968, 1969)
- Stats at Pro Football Reference
- College Football Hall of Fame

Thomas Newton Curtis (born November 1, 1947) is an American former professional football player who was a safety in the National Football League (NFL). He played college football for the Michigan Wolverines from 1967 to 1969. He was selected as a consensus All-American in 1969. He also broke Michigan's records for interceptions in a game, season, and career—none of which have been broken. He also set the NCAA career record with 431 return yards off interceptions. Curtis also played two seasons for the Baltimore Colts (1970–1971) which included the Colts' Super Bowl V winning team. He was inducted into the College Football Hall of Fame in 2005.

== Early life ==
Curtis was born in Cleveland, Ohio in 1947. He grew up in Aurora, Ohio, where he was the quarterback on the Aurora High School football team. He was a Class A All-Ohio quarterback in high school.

== University of Michigan ==
Curtis played college football at the University of Michigan from 1967 to 1969. As a freshman in 1966, he played at the quarterback position on the all-freshman team.

As a sophomore, the Michigan coaching staff asked Curtis to move from the quarterback position to the safety position. Curtis told a reporter the following year, "It took a little mental adjustment on my part, but it was all right with me. I wanted to play, and it was pretty obvious I wasn't going to beat out (Dick) Vidmer." Curtis started eight games at safety and one at cornerback for the 1967 Michigan Wolverines football team. On November 11, 1967, Curtis had three interceptions against Illinois, which remains tied for Michigan's single game record. During the 1967 season (his first as a defensive back), Curtis totaled seven interceptions to tie the Big Ten Conference record. In June 1968, Curtis received the Frederick C. Matthei Scholarship Award for sportsmanship off and on the field.

As a junior, Curtis started all 10 games for the 1968 team that finished the season with a record of 8-2. He totaled 10 interceptions in 1968, a mark that remains Michigan's single season record. He was selected as a first-team All-Big Ten player after the 1968 season.

As a senior, Curtis started all 11 games at safety for the 1969 team that was the first to be coached by Bo Schembechler. He intercepted eight passes for 156 yards in 1969. Two of his interceptions came in the Michigan's victory in the 1969 Ohio State game, regarded as one of the biggest upsets in college football history. He was selected as a consensus first-team All-American (selected as first-team by, among others, the United Press, Associated Press and Football News).

With 25 career interceptions, Curtis still holds Michigan's all-time career interceptions record. (Charles Woodson is second with 18 interceptions.) His career total of 431 return yards off interceptions also broke the NCAA record set by Lynn Chandnois in the 1940s. At the end of the 2010 college football season, Curtis was tied for fourth place in career interceptions in NCAA Division I-A/FBS history. In an interview in 1968, Curtis said he knew how to think like a quarterback after playing five years at the position. He noted that his ability to think like a quarterback and read formations helped make him successful as a defensive back. Asked years later about his skill at intercepting passes, Curtis said, "I'm not certain how I did it. It was a combination of instinct, great hands and quickness -- not speed."

In 2005, Curtis was inducted into the College Football Hall of Fame.

== Professional football ==
Curtis was selected by the Baltimore Colts in the 14th round (356th overall pick) of the 1970 NFL draft. He appeared in 24 games for the Colts during the 1970 and 1971 seasons. In August 1972, Curtis was traded to the Los Angeles Rams for a future draft pick. He was cut by the Rams and picked up on waivers by the Miami Dolphins. He missed the Dolphins' undefeated 1972 season with a knee injury that kept him on injured reserve status. In late July 1973, Curtis announced his retirement from professional football.

== Family and publishing career ==
Curtis met his wife, Debbie, in Miami. They were married in approximately 1974 and live in Miami. The couple have two sons, Brad and Matthew, and a daughter, Tammi, who is married to former Michigan head coach Lloyd Carr's son, Jason Carr.

Curtis owns and operates Curtis Publishing Company, one of the nation's largest privately owned publishing companies. The company's publications include Steelers Digest and River Cities Gazette. He was also the owner and publisher of Football News.
