= Jim Young (American football coach) =

American football player and coach (born 1935)

Biographical details
- Born: April 21, 1935 (age 91)

Playing career
- 1954: Ohio State
- 1956: Bowling Green
- Position: Fullback

Coaching career (HC unless noted)
- 1957: Bowling Green (GA)
- 1958–1959: Bowling Green (assistant)
- 1960–1963: Shawnee (OH)
- 1964–1968: Miami (OH) (assistant)
- 1969–1972: Michigan (DC)
- 1973–1976: Arizona
- 1977–1981: Purdue
- 1983–1990: Army
- 1992–1994: Arizona (assistant)

Head coaching record
- Overall: 120–71–2 (college); 28–10–1 (high school)
- Bowls: 5–1

Accomplishments and honors

Championships
- 1 WAC (1973)

Awards
- WAC Coach of the Year (1973); Big Ten Coach of the Year (1978)
- College Football Hall of Fame; Inducted in 1999 (profile)

Jim Young (born April 21, 1935) is an American former college football player and coach. He served as the head football coach at the University of Arizona (1973–1976), Purdue University (1977–1981), and the United States Military Academy (1983–1990), compiling a career head coaching record of 120–71–2. Young was inducted into the College Football Hall of Fame as a coach in 1999.

In addition to achieving a bowl game record of 5–1, Young was the interim coach for the 1969 Michigan Wolverines football team during the 1970 Rose Bowl, as Bo Schembechler was hospitalized following a mild heart attack.

== Coaching career ==
=== Purdue ===
Prior to the last game of the 1976 season, Young inquired to athletic director Dave Strack about any coaching inquiries. Purdue and Illinois inquired about his services. The Boilermakers offered him a substantial raise to $60,000 a year.

On December 4, 1976, Purdue University hired Young away from Arizona. When Young arrived at Purdue, he named true freshman, Mark Herrmann as the team's starting quarterback, and the freshman lived up to expectations, throwing for 2,041 yards through the team's first eight games. Herrmann broke the NCAA record for passing yards (2,453) and passing touchdowns (18) for freshman. In 1978, Young lead Purdue to a 9–2–1 record, and a victory over Georgia Tech in the 1978 Peach Bowl. Young was named the Big Ten's Coach of the Year, the first Boilermaker head coach to ever win the award. Throughout his career, Herrmann would break the Big Ten's all-time career passing yards (6,734) and passing touchdowns (48) before his senior season. After a disappointing 1981 season, Young resigned from his position as head coach at Purdue, citing his desire to concentrate on athletic administration rather than deal with the intense pressure and recruiting that came with the head coach position.

=== Army ===
On December 30, 1982, Young was hired to serve as head coach at Army, which had just one winning season in the last ten years. He won two games that year. The following year proved to be historic for Army. The Cadets won seven games in the regular season, the most since 1977. They were invited to the 1984 Cherry Bowl for their first ever invitation to a bowl game. They beat Michigan State 10–6 for their first ever bowl victory. The following season saw them win their first five games to reach the AP Poll for the first time since 1962. They lost to Notre Dame the following week but rebounded to finish with an 8–3 regular season. They were invited to the Peach Bowl. They beat Illinois 31–29 to reach nine wins in a season for the first time since 1949. Young had just two losing seasons in eight years with Army, which saw them win nine games in 1988; Army would not win nine games again until 2020. Young led Army to three Commander-in-Chief's Trophys (1984, 1986, 1988).

On August 28, 1990, Young announced that he would retire at the end of the 1990 season for personal reasons. His defensive coordinator Bob Sutton was named the head coach for 1991.

Young planned to retire after moving to Tucson, Arizona when he left Army. However, prior to the 1992 season, Dick Tomey inquired about Young possibly taking a job as an assistant on his program at Arizona, which Young accepted; he coached the offensive line for the next three seasons.

Young went 51-39-1 at the program while going 5-3 in the Army–Navy Game. Young was inducted into the Army team Hall of Fame in 2012.

== Head coaching record ==
=== College ===
Year	Team	Overall	Conference	Standing	Bowl/playoffs	Coaches^{#}	AP^{°}
Arizona Wildcats (Western Athletic Conference) (1973–1976)
1973	Arizona	8–3	6–1	T–1st			
1974	Arizona	9–2	6–1	2nd			
1975	Arizona	9–2	5–2	2nd		13	18
1976	Arizona	5–6	3–4	T–5th			
Arizona:		31–13	20–8				
Purdue Boilermakers (Big Ten Conference) (1977–1981)
1977	Purdue	5–6	3–5	T–6th			
1978	Purdue	9–2–1	6–1–1	3rd	W Peach	13	13
1979	Purdue	10–2	7–1	2nd	W Astro-Bluebonnet	10	10
1980	Purdue	9–3	7–1	T–2nd	W Liberty	16	17
1981	Purdue	5–6	3–6	T–8th			
Purdue:		38–19–1	26–14–1				
Army Black Knights (NCAA Division I-A independent) (1983–1990)
1983	Army	2–9					
1984	Army	8–3–1			W Cherry		
1985	Army	9–3			W Peach		
1986	Army	6–5					
1987	Army	5–6					
1988	Army	9–3			L Sun		
1989	Army	6–5					
1990	Army	6–5					
Army:		51–39–1					
Total:		120–71–2					
National championship Conference title Conference division title or championship game berth
^{#}Rankings from final Coaches Poll.; ^{°}Rankings from final AP Poll.
