= Jim Betts (American football) =

American gridiron football player (born 1949)

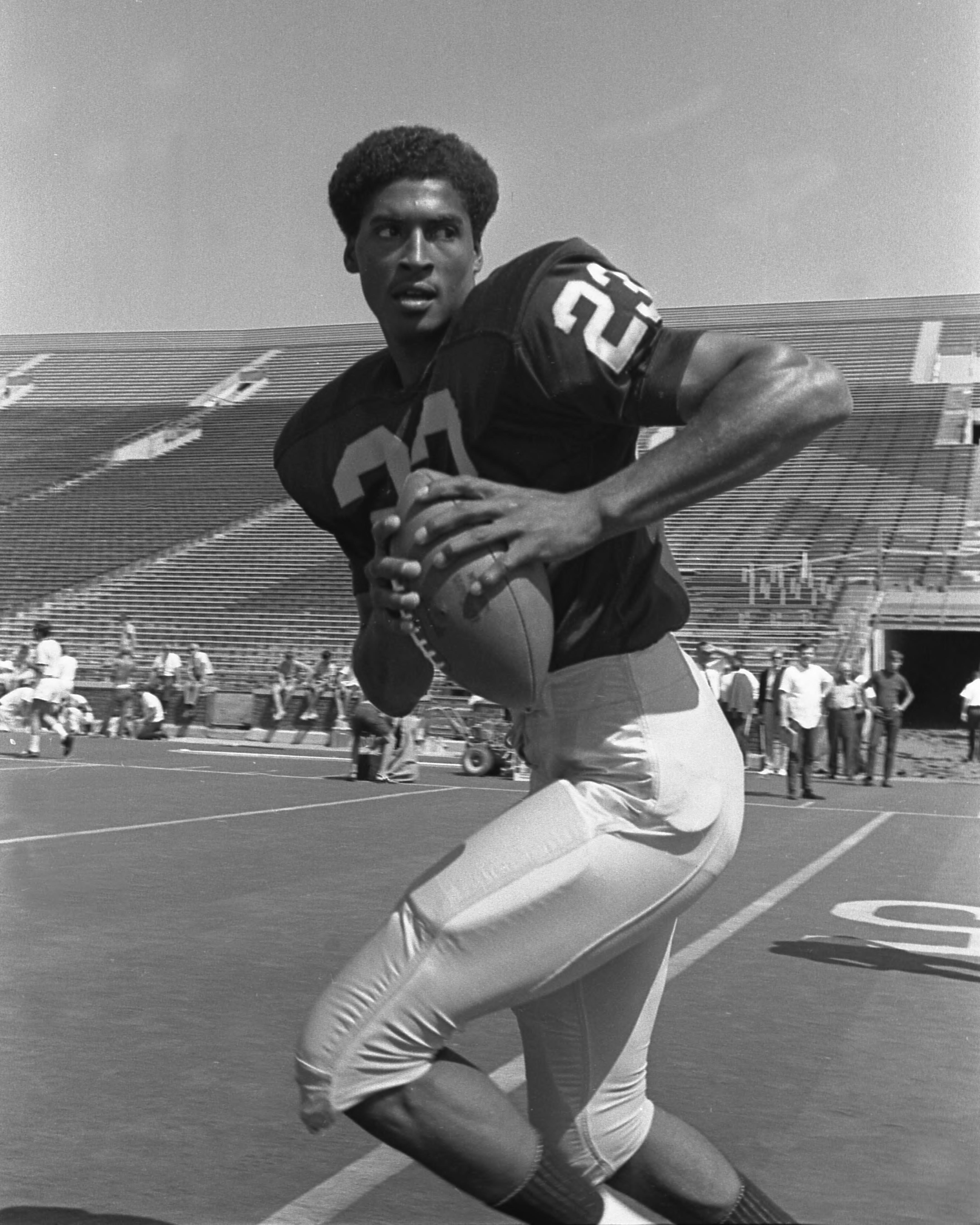
- Betts in 1969

No. 23 – Michigan Wolverines
- Positions: Quarterback, safety

Personal information
- Born: May 18, 1949 (age 77)
- Listed height: 6 ft 5 in (1.96 m)

Career information
- High school: Benedictine (Cleveland, Ohio)
- College: Michigan (1968–1970); Hamilton Tiger-Cats (?)

Awards and highlights
- Second-team All-Big Ten (1970)

Nathaniel James Betts III (born May 1949) is a former American football player, university administrator, and business executive focusing on diversity and inclusion in the workplace. He played college football for the University of Michigan from 1968 to 1970. He also briefly played professional football for the Hamilton Tiger-Cats of the Canadian Football League (CFL). During the 1970s, he worked as an administrator in the University of Michigan athletic department. He later pursued a career in business and was in charge of minority recruitment at Domino's Pizza for many years.

== Early career ==
A native of Cleveland, Ohio, Betts played high school football at Benedictine High School in Cleveland. He enrolled at the University of Michigan in 1967 and played college football there from 1968 to 1970. He played at several positions during his collegiate career, including quarterback, running back, wide receiver and safety. As a sophomore in 1968, Betts played at the running back and wide receiver positions. When Bo Schembechler became the team's head football coach in 1969, protests by African American players were disrupting the Indiana Hoosiers football team. An organization known as the Black Action Movement (BAM) was also spreading in Ann Arbor. Amid the threat of deteriorating race relations, Betts saw an opportunity to alter Schembechler's clean-shave policy. Betts told the coach that facial hair was part of the African American players' "heritage." Schembechler agreed to relax the policy, reportedly "to the amusement of the rest of the players, both black and white, who believed Betts was full of shit."

As the backup quarterback for the 1969 Michigan Wolverines football team, he totaled 293 passing yards, two passing touchdowns, 130 rushing yards and three rushing touchdowns. His best game as a quarterback came against Illinois on November 8, 1969, when he completed six of nine passes for 106 yards, including touchdown passes to Garvie Craw and John Gable. He also rushed for 51 yards and a touchdown on nine carries. Michigan defeated Illinois by a score of 57–0, marking the second worst defeat in the history of the Illinois football program.

Betts also played in the 1969 Michigan vs. Ohio State football game, considered one of the biggest upsets in college football history. The unranked Wolverines defeated the No. 1 Buckeyes by a 24–12 score. The day before the game, a fight broke out between players from the two teams as they passed each other in the tunnel at Michigan Stadium. Schembechler and Woody Hayes separated the players. Forty years later, Betts recalled: "On Friday, the Buckeyes were on the field first, doing their walk-through drills. Before they left, they lined up in the tunnel on both sides. As we made our way to the field, some Buckeye made a nasty comment and all hell broke loose. Woody and Bo were trying to separate guys as we were all fighting like cats and dogs. One of us yelled that we'd beat 'em tomorrow. And we did!".

As a senior, Betts told Schembechler he was unhappy in the backup role and persuaded the coach to allow him to move to the defensive unit for the 1970 Michigan Wolverines football team. During spring practice, he made the switch to the safety position and received the Meyer Morton Trophy, awarded each year to the Michigan football player who showed "the greatest development and most promise as a result of the annual spring practice." In his final game in a Michigan uniform, Betts had 14 tackles and intercepted a pass to set up a Michigan score in the 1970 Michigan-Ohio State game.

After the 1970 football season, Betts was selected to play on defense for the Blue team in the annual Blue-Gray All-Star Game in Birmingham, Alabama.

== Professional football ==
Betts was drafted by the New York Jets in the 10th round (240th overall pick) of the 1971 NFL draft. In May 1971, he signed a contract to play for the Jets as a backup quarterback and safety. However, an eye injury cast uncertainty over his potential career as a professional football player. He lost 70% of the vision in his left eye in a swimming accident when a whistle struck him in the eye. He was cut by the Jets in training camp, tried out with the Minnesota Vikings, but was cut by them as well. He did play professional football for a short time with the Hamilton Tiger-Cats of the Canadian Football League.

== Later life ==
After his playing career ended, Betts worked for Goodyear Tire and Rubber Company for two years. In August 1974, he was hired by the University of Michigan to direct the academic counseling and tutoring service for the university's student-athletes. In that capacity, he became an advocate for football players to complete their degrees.

In 1978, Betts moved to Chicago where he accepted a position with a financial services firm. He subsequently returned to Ann Arbor where he worked for an advertising firm founded by a former Michigan football player, Don Coleman.

In the late 1980s, Betts was hired by Domino's Pizza as its Director of Minority Recruitment, a position he held for at least 15 years. He also served as the company's Director of Urban Initiatives.

Betts is married to Marty Betts, a former weight loss professional. They have two sons, Eric Stanton Betts, an actor in Los Angeles, and Evan James Betts, a fitness professional and model in New York City.
