= Jim Mandich =

American football player (1948–2011)

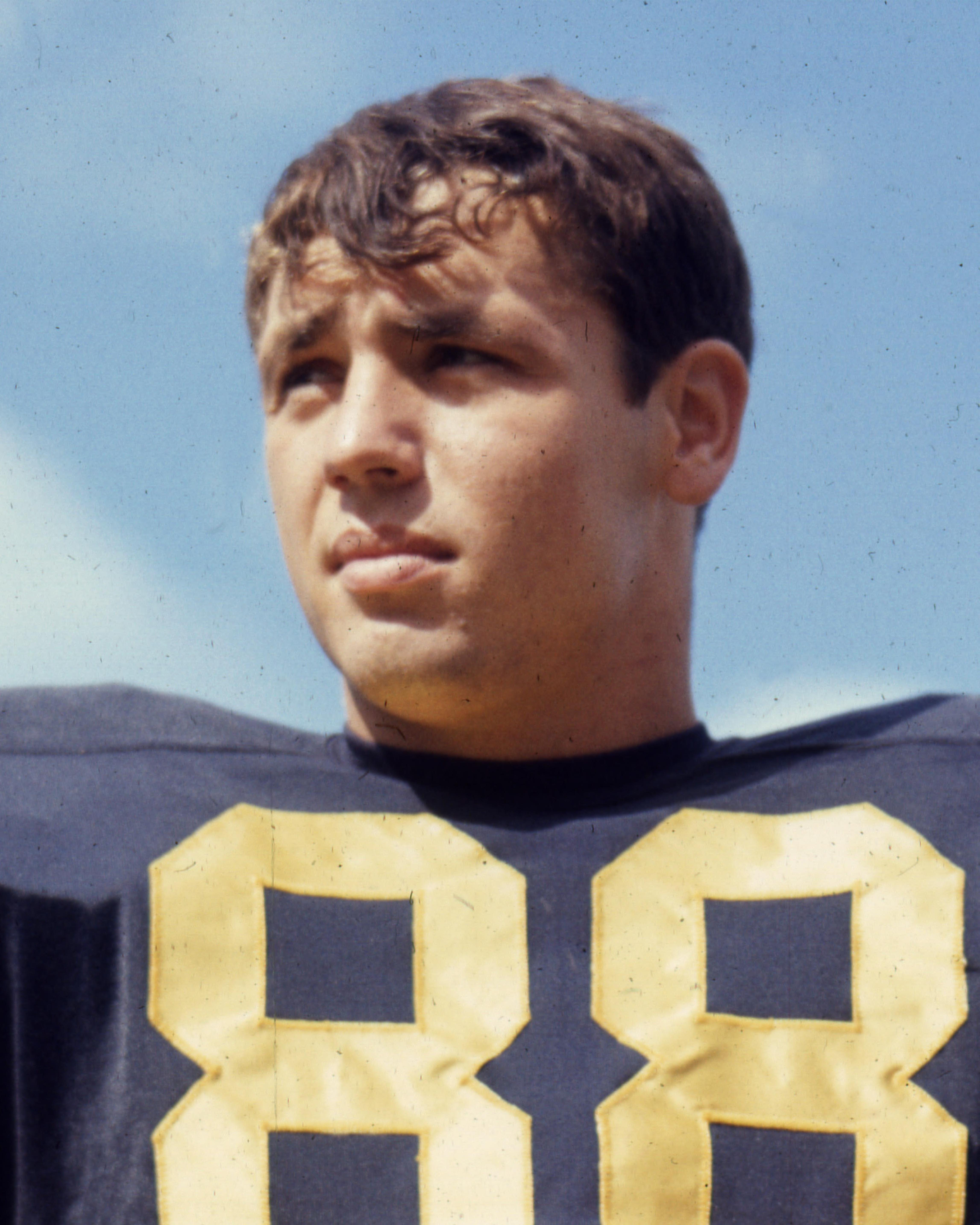
- Mandich in 1969

No. 88, 87
- Position: Tight end

Personal information
- Born: July 30, 1948; Cleveland, Ohio, U.S.
- Died: April 26, 2011 (aged 62); Miami Lakes, Florida, U.S.
- Listed height: 6 ft 2 in (1.88 m)
- Listed weight: 224 lb (102 kg)

Career information
- High school: Solon (Solon, Ohio)
- College: Michigan (1966–1969)
- NFL draft: 1970: 2nd round, 29th overall pick

Career history
- Miami Dolphins (1970–1977); Washington Redskins (1978)*; Pittsburgh Steelers (1978)
- * Offseason or practice squad member only

Awards and highlights
- 3× Super Bowl champion (VII, VIII, XIII); Miami Dolphins Honor Roll; Unanimous All-American (1969); 2× First-team All-Big Ten (1968–1969)

Career NFL statistics
- Receptions: 121
- Receiving yards: 1,406
- Receiving touchdowns: 23
- Stats at Pro Football Reference
- College Football Hall of Fame

James Michael Mandich (July 30, 1948 – April 26, 2011), also known as "Mad Dog", was an American professional football player who was a tight end in the National Football League (NFL). Mandich played college football for the Michigan Wolverines from 1967 to 1969 and was recognized as a consensus first-team tight end on the 1969 College Football All-America Team. A second-round pick in the 1970 NFL draft, he played in the NFL for the Miami Dolphins (1970–1977) and Pittsburgh Steelers (1978). After his playing career ended, he worked as the color commentator for the Miami Dolphins and also hosted a sports talk show on local AM radio in Miami.

== Early life ==
Mandich was born in Cleveland to a Serbian immigrant father. He graduated from Solon High School in Solon, Ohio. While at Solon High, Mandich won 12 letters and was an All-Ohio and All-America football player.

== University of Michigan ==
Mandich enrolled at the University of Michigan in 1965 and played for coach Bump Elliott and coach Bo Schembechler's Michigan Wolverines football teams from 1967 to 1969. As a sophomore, Mandich started six games at the left end position for the 1967 Michigan Wolverines football team that compiled a 4–6 record. Mandich caught 25 passes for 248 yards during the 1967 season.

As a junior, Mandich started eight of ten games at the left end position for the 1968 Michigan team that improved to 8–2 and was ranked No. 12 in the final AP Poll. With Dennis Brown at quarterback, Mandich caught 42 passes for 565 yards and three touchdowns. Brown and Mandich were both selected by the Associated Press (AP) as first-team players on the 1968 All-Big Ten Conference football team.

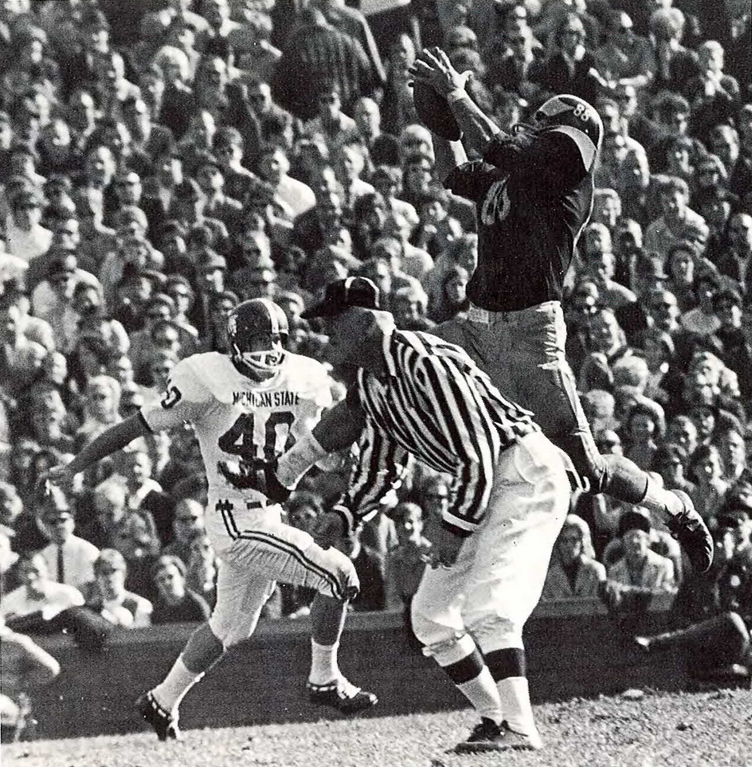
Mandich leaps for the ball in 1967 Michigan State game.

Prior to the start of his senior season, Mandich was elected captain of the 1969 Michigan team under new head coach Bo Schembechler. Mandich led the 1969 team to a Big Ten Conference championship, an upset victory over Ohio State and the 1970 Rose Bowl. Mandich had the best game of his collegiate career on October 11, 1969, catching 10 passes for 156 yards while scoring a touchdown and setting up two others in a victory over Purdue. Over the course of the 1969 season, Mandich caught 51 passes for 676 yards and three touchdowns and was selected by the AP as a first-team All-Big Ten player for the second consecutive year. Mandich was also selected as the most valuable player on the 1969 Michigan team, and a consensus first-team tight end on the 1969 College Football All-America Team.

Mandich finished his collegiate career at Michigan ranked second only to Jack Clancy in career receptions (Mandich had 118, Clancy had 132) and receiving yards (Mandich had 1,489, Clancy had 1,917). Mandich was inducted into the University of Michigan Athletic Hall of Honor in 1994 and the College Football Hall of Fame in 2004.

== Professional football ==
=== Miami Dolphins ===
Mandich was selected by the Miami Dolphins in the second round (29th overall pick) of the 1970 NFL draft. He signed with the Dolphins in July 1970.

Mandich joined the Dolphins in 1970, their first season under head coach Don Shula. Mandich appeared in 14 games for the 1970 Dolphins, but caught only one pass for three yards and a touchdown against the Houston Oilers on September 27, 1970. In Mandich's second NFL season, the Dolphins lost Super Bowl VI to the Dallas Cowboys. Mandich appeared in 11 games for the 1971 Dolphins and caught three passes for 19 yards and a touchdown.

In his third year in the NFL, Mandich appeared in all 14 games for the undefeated 1972 Miami Dolphins that defeated the Washington Redskins in Super Bowl VII. Mandich had 11 catches for 168 yards and three touchdowns for the 1972 Dolphins. In the playoffs, he had two catches, a five-yard catch against the Pittsburgh Steelers and a 19-yard reception in Super Bowl VII.

In 1973, Mandich again appeared in all 14 games for the Dolphins team that defeated the Minnesota Vikings in Super Bowl VIII. Mandich caught 24 passes for 302 yards and four touchdowns for the 1973 Dolphins.

Mandich's most productive year in the NFL was 1974, when he again appeared in all 14 games and had 33 receptions for 374 yards and six touchdowns. Mandich remained with the Dolphins through the 1977 season, totaling 21 catches for 217 yards and four touchdowns in 1975 and 22 catches for 260 yards and four touchdowns in 1977, before dropping off in 1978 to only six catches for 63 yards.

=== Pittsburgh Steelers ===
In May 1978, the Dolphins traded Mandich to the Washington Redskins in exchange for two eighth-round draft selections in 1979 and 1980. He did not appear in any regular season games for the Redskins, but, after an injury to Bennie Cunningham, Mandich was signed in October 1978 as a backup tight end for the Pittsburgh Steelers. Mandich appeared in 10 regular season and three playoff games for the 1978 Steelers team that won Super Bowl XIII, making him the only man to play on the first two teams in NFL history to win 14 games in a season. Mandich had no receptions during the 1978 season, and at the conclusion of the season, Mandich announced his retirement from football.

== NFL career statistics ==
Legend
| | Won the Super Bowl |
| **Bold** | Career high |

=== Regular season ===
| Year | Team | Games | | Receiving | | | | |
| Year | Team | GP | GS | Rec | Yds | Avg | Lng | TD |
|---|---|---|---|---|---|---|---|---|
| 1970 | MIA | **14** | 0 | 1 | 3 | 3.0 | 3 | 1 |
| 1971 | MIA | 11 | 1 | 3 | 19 | 6.3 | 10 | 1 |
| 1972 | MIA | **14** | 0 | 11 | 168 | **15.3** | 39 | 3 |
| 1973 | MIA | **14** | 3 | 24 | 302 | 12.6 | 28 | 4 |
| 1974 | MIA | **14** | **10** | **33** | **374** | 11.3 | **44** | **6** |
| 1975 | MIA | **14** | 6 | 21 | 217 | 10.3 | 32 | 4 |
| 1976 | MIA | **14** | 3 | 22 | 260 | 11.8 | 31 | 4 |
| 1977 | MIA | **14** | 0 | 6 | 63 | 10.5 | 15 | 0 |
| 1978 | PIT | 10 | 0 | 0 | 0 | 0.0 | 0 | 0 |
| Career | | 119 | 23 | 121 | 1,406 | 11.6 | 44 | 23 |

=== Playoffs ===
| Year | Team | Games | | Receiving | | | | |
| Year | Team | GP | GS | Rec | Yds | Avg | Lng | TD |
|---|---|---|---|---|---|---|---|---|
| 1970 | MIA | 1 | 0 | 0 | 0 | 0.0 | 0 | 0 |
| 1971 | MIA | **3** | 0 | 2 | 13 | 6.5 | 9 | 0 |
| 1972 | MIA | **3** | 0 | 2 | 24 | **12.0** | **19** | 0 |
| 1973 | MIA | **3** | **3** | **5** | **49** | 9.8 | 13 | **1** |
| 1974 | MIA | 1 | 0 | 0 | 0 | 0.0 | 0 | 0 |
| 1978 | PIT | **3** | 0 | 0 | 0 | 0.0 | 0 | 0 |
| Career | | 14 | 3 | 9 | 86 | 9.6 | 19 | 1 |

== Later life ==
Mandich was the radio sports talk show host on WIOD 610 AM from 1983 to 1987, and joined WQAM 560 in 1987. He also did color commentary on Dolphins radio broadcasts on which he was teamed with Jimmy Cefalo and Joe Rose. He was known for his trademark soundbite "All right, Miami!" When he gave out the call-in number for cell phone users, he playfully told his radio listeners to call "if you're riding around with the windows down." Diagnosed with cholangiocarcinoma, a cancer of the bile duct, in early 2010, Mandich became absent from his afternoon show. In the fall of 2010, the terminally ill commentator returned to the broadcast booth for his final season of game-day color commentary.

== Death ==
Mandich died from cancer in April 2011 in Miami Lakes, Florida, at age 62. At a public memorial the following month at Sun Life Stadium, Mandich was remembered by speakers that included former Michigan teammate Tom Curtis and former Dolphins teammates, Nat Moore, Dick Anderson, Kim Bokamper, Joe Rose, Nick Buoniconti, Bob Griese, Jimmy Cefalo, and coach Don Shula. Shula announced at the service that Mandich would be added to the Miami Dolphins Honor Roll — a ring around the second tier at Sun Life Stadium that honors former players, coaches, contributors, and officials who have made significant contributions to the Miami Dolphins franchise.

== See also ==
- List of Michigan Wolverines football All-Americans
- Lists of Michigan Wolverines football receiving leaders
- University of Michigan Athletic Hall of Honor
