= Dick Hunter =

American football player & coach

Playing career
- 1952–1954: Miami (Ohio)
- Position: Quarterback

Coaching career (HC unless noted)
- 1955–1958: Barberton High School (Ohio) (assistant)
- 1958–1961: Denison (assistant)
- 1961–1963: Wake Forest (assistant)
- 1967–1968: Miami (Ohio) (assistant)
- 1969–1971: Michigan (assistant)

Dick Hunter (November 16, 1933 - March 23, 2026) was an American former football player and coach. He played quarterback for Miami University from 1952 to 1954 under coach Ara Parseghian and later coached under Bo Schembechler at both Miami and the University of Michigan. He was inducted into the Miami University Hall of Fame in 1993.

== Biography ==
=== Playing career ===
Hunter attended Miami University in Oxford, Ohio where he played football for Ara Parseghian from 1952 to 1954. He was Miami's starring quarterback in 1953 and 1954. In 1954, Miami won the Mid-American Conference championship, and Hunter was selected as a first-team All-MAC player and led the conference in both passing and punting. Hunter also led Miami to its first-ever victory over a Big Ten school with a touchdown pass to defeat the Indiana Hoosiers by a 6 to - score in 1954. In naming Hunter as the 1954 All-MAC quarterback, the International News Service wrote: "The team's quarterback, Hunter, would rate with signal-callers and passers on any conference squad in the country. The 170-pound senior passed for eight touchdowns and scored three himself as he led his mates to one of Miami's greatest seasons. His completion average was close to .600."

=== Coaching career ===
In May 1955, Hunter signed a professional contract with the Edmonton Eskimos of the Canadian Football League, but he opted instead for a career in coaching. After graduating from Miami in 1955, Hunter spent nearly 20 years as a football coach. He was an assistant football coach at Barberton High School from 1955 to 1958, Denison University from 1958 to 1961, and Wake Forest University from 1961 to 1963. In the mid-1960s, he was the head football coach at Wadsworth High School. In 1967, he accepted a position at Miami University as an assistant coach under Bo Schembechler. When Schembechler accepted the head coaching job at the University of Michigan in 1969, Hunter was hired as an assistant coach at Michigan. Hunter served as an assistant football coach at Michigan for three years from 1969 to 1971. Hunter was inducted into the Miami University Hall of Fame in 1993.
