= Tom Beckman =

American football player (born 1950)

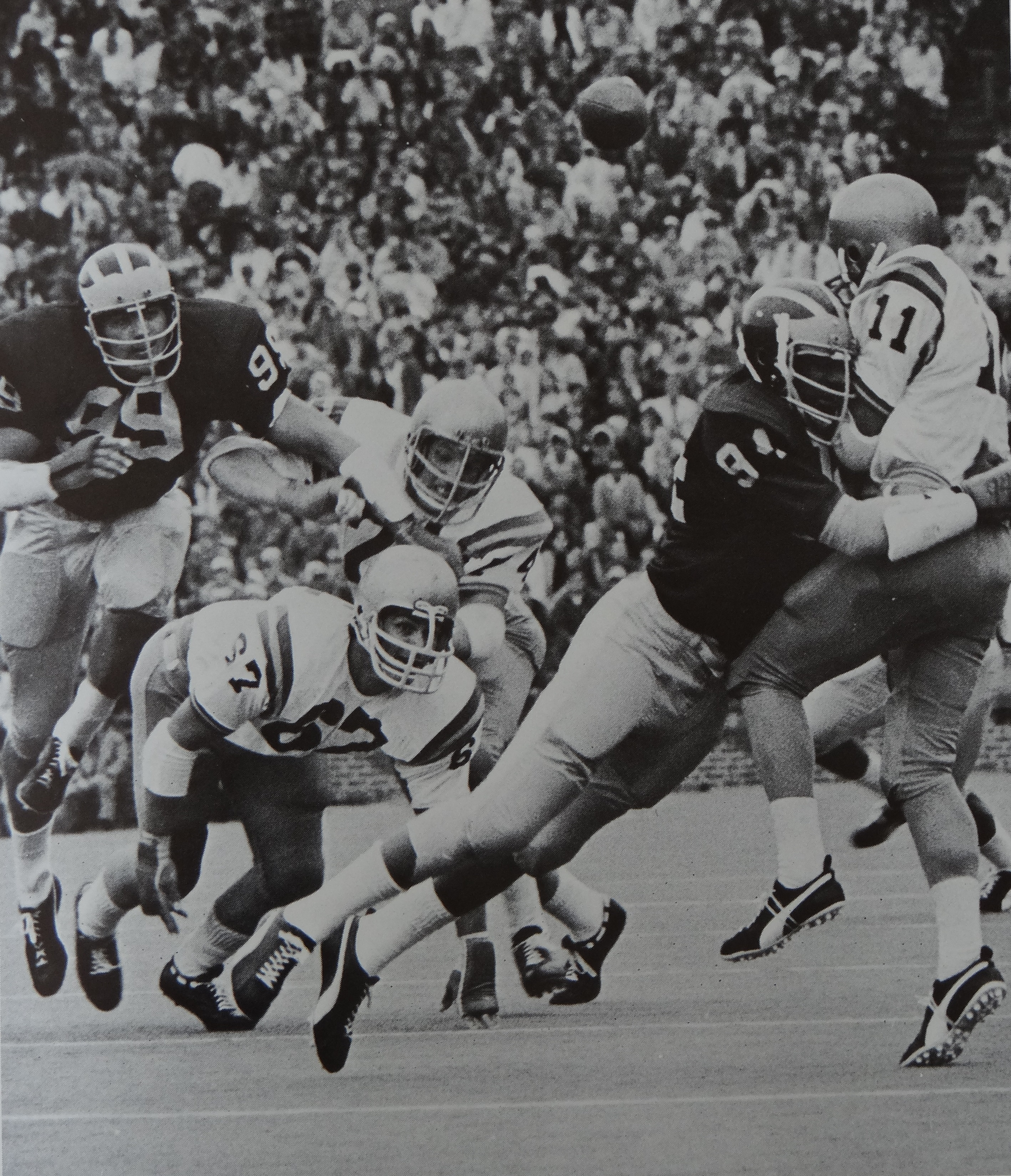
- Beckman (99) and Butch Carpenter (94) from 1972 Michiganensian

No. 89
- Position: Defensive end

Personal information
- Born: September 21, 1950 (age 76); Saginaw, Michigan, U.S.
- Listed height: 6 ft 5 in (1.96 m)
- Listed weight: 250 lb (113 kg)

Career information
- College: Michigan (1969–1971)

Career history
- St. Louis Cardinals (1972); Memphis Southmen (1974–1975)

Awards and highlights
- Second-team All-Big Ten (1971)

Career college statistics
- Games: 16
- Tackles: 88
- Solo: 53
- Stats at Pro Football Reference

Thomas Clare Beckman (born September 21, 1950) is an American former professional football player. He played college football for the Michigan Wolverines from 1969 to 1971 under head coach Bo Schembechler. He played professional football for the St. Louis Cardinals of the National Football League (NFL) in 1972 and for the Memphis Southmen of the World Football League (WFL) from 1974 to 1975.

== Early life ==
Beckman was born in Saginaw, Michigan, and went to H.S > Chesaning, Michigan. He starred in both football, basketball, Baseball and Track at Chesaning High School, graduating in 1968.

== University of Michigan ==
Beckman enrolled at the University of Michigan in 1968 on a football scholarship. After his freshman year, Michigan head coach Bump Elliott retired and was replaced by Bo Schembechler. Beckman played for Schembechler during his first three years as head coach. He later recalled the transition from Elliott to Schembechler as follows:

"I had no idea who the guy was. I found out in our first meeting. He was very intense with well-defined goals. My first impression was, 'We'll see.' ... He basically put us through hell during winter conditioning. I think he did that so that those without the want, ability or heart would leave."

Beckman played for Schembechler from 1969 to 1971. During those seasons, the team finished with records of 8-3 (1969), 9-1 (1970), and 11-1 (1971). During the 1970 and 1971 seasons, Beckman became a starter at the end, linebacker, and tackle positions. In 1971, he accumulated 64 tackles, including 42 solo tackles.

== Professional football ==
Beckman was selected by the St. Louis Cardinals in the third round (57th overall pick) of the 1972 NFL draft. During a 1972 pre-season game against the Buffalo Bills, Beckman tore cartilage in his knee while trying to tackle O. J. Simpson. Beckman recalled, "Back then, they didn't have the scope (arthroscopic surgery), so they cut you open and it was major surgery." Beckman returned from the knee surgery to play in two games for the Cardinals during the 1972 NFL season. Interviewed in 2008, Beckman questioned the wisdom of his decision to return to action so soon after the knee surgery: "After surgery, the doctor said do what you want. I was playing seven weeks later. Looking back, that was the wrong thing to do. I'm on tap for knee replacement because of it."

In 1973, Beckman was released by the Cardinals after breaking his foot in an exhibition game. The New Orleans Saints acquired Beckman on waivers from the Cardinals in October 1973, but he failed the physical. A lawsuit was filed over Beckman's broken foot, which he later recalled as follows: "I signed with the Saints, but I failed the physical ... I had a broken foot. The Cardinals insisted that my foot was not broken. There was a lawsuit that was settled out court several years later."

He played for the Memphis Southmen in the WFL from 1974 to 1975. During a September 1974 game against Portland, Beckman recovered a fumble and returned it 57 yards to the one-yard line. In the 1974 season with Memphis, Beckman knocked down 21 attempted passes and intercepted one. He was selected to the All World defensive team. Signed a contract with the Washington Redskins for the 1976 season and was released during the Exhibition season.

Beckman retired from Professional football in 1976.

== Later life ==
After retiring from football in 1976, Beckman worked for General Motors Corporation. He spent more than 33 years with GM. As of 2008, he was in charge of new vehicle launches for the company. 2011 Engineering manager for Navistar Defense building and updating war fighters for the DOD. 2012 Powertrain PMT Leader for Ford Motor Company.

In 2008, Beckman was inducted into the Saginaw County Sports Hall of Fame.
