= Garvie Craw =

American football player (1948–2007)

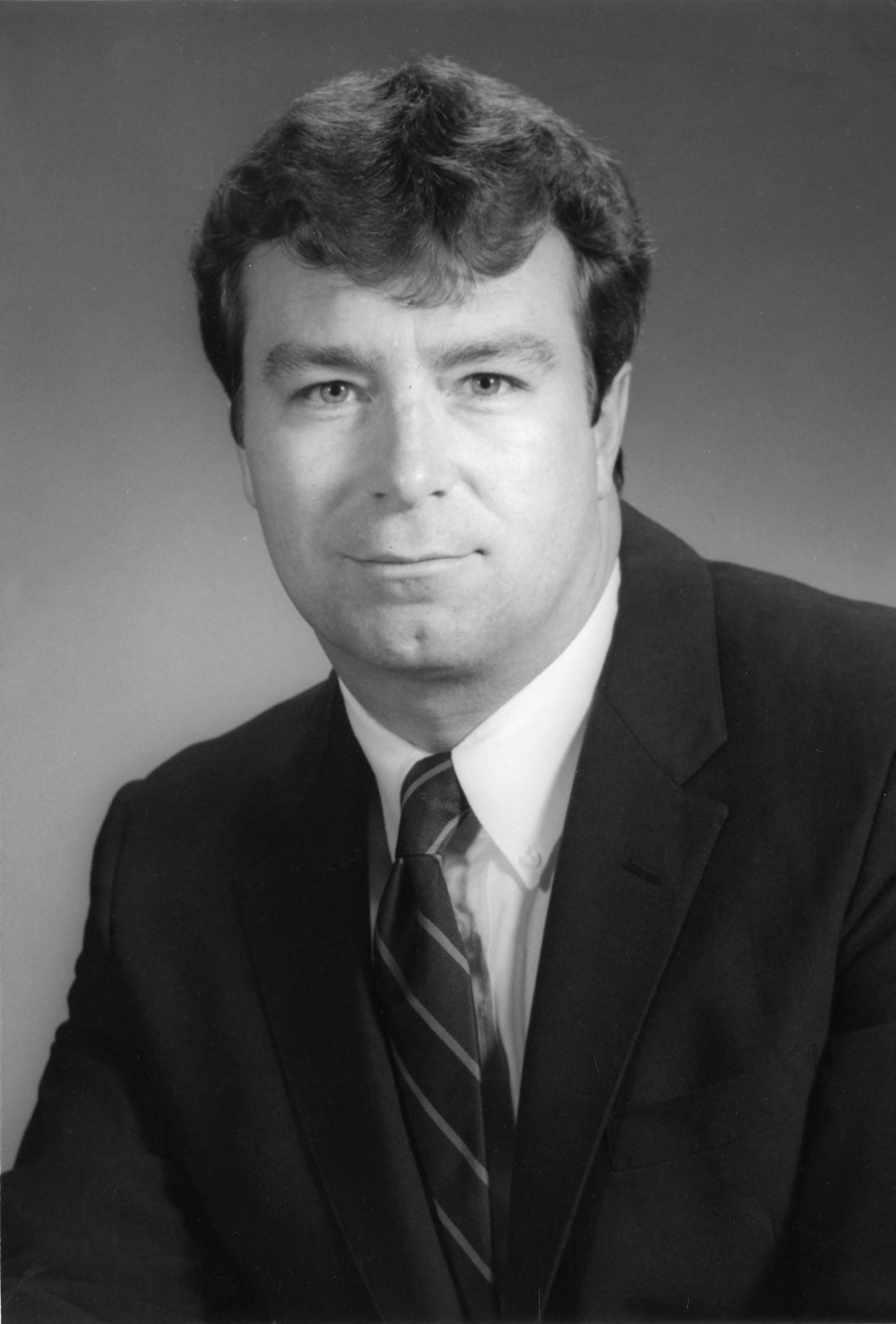
- Craw in 1969

No. 48 – Michigan Wolverines
- Positions: Fullback, Halfback

Personal information
- Born: January 25, 1948
- Died: July 27, 2007 (aged 59)

Career information
- High school: Montclair High School, Montclair, New Jersey
- College: Michigan

Career history
- 1967–1969: Michigan

Garvie Craw (January 25, 1948 – July 27, 2007) was an American football player.

Craw played college football for the University of Michigan from 1967 to 1969. In October 1969, he scored four touchdowns in a 57-0 victory over Illinois. In Michigan's 1969 upset victory over an Ohio State team that Sports Illustrated called "The Team of the Century," he scored two touchdowns and rushed for 56 yards. Craw later recalled, "I remember moving the ball that first series and thinking: 'Damn we're just cutting through those guys,' and thinking, early on: 'We're going to beat these guys.'"

Craw was married to his wife, Susan, in 1969. He graduated from Michigan in 1970 with a degree in English. He signed with the New England Patriots in May 1970. He later helped found G.X. Clarke & Co., a government securities dealer. Craw and his wife had three children, Stacey, Corey and Matt.
