= 1970 Rose Bowl =

American college football game

- 56th Rose Bowl Game
USC Trojans	Michigan Wolverines
(9–0–1)	(8–2)
Pac-8	Big Ten
10	3
Head coach: John McKay	Head coach: Jim Young (interim)
AP / Coaches; 5 / 4	AP / Coaches; 7 / 8
	1	2	3	4	Total
USC	3	0	7	0	10
Michigan	0	0	3	0	3
- Date: January 1, 1970
- Season: 1969
- Stadium: Rose Bowl
- Location: Pasadena, California
- MVP: Bob Chandler (FL, USC)
- Favorite: Michigan by 4½ points
- Referee: Ross Dean (Big Ten; split crew: Big Ten, Pac-8)
- Attendance: 103,878

United States TV coverage
- Network: NBC
- Announcers: Curt Gowdy, Kyle Rote
- Nielsen ratings: 29.7

The 1970 Rose Bowl was the 56th edition of the college football bowl game, played at the Rose Bowl in Pasadena, California, on Thursday, January 1. The USC Trojans, champions of the Pacific-8 Conference, defeated the Michigan Wolverines, champions of the Big Ten Conference, 10–3. USC flanker Bob Chandler scored the only touchdown and was named the Player of the Game.

== Teams ==
=== Michigan ===
After early season losses to #9 Missouri and unranked Michigan State, the Wolverines won four straight games before their showdown with heavily-favored and top-ranked Ohio State for the Big Ten championship. Michigan shocked the college football world by upsetting the top-ranked Buckeyes 24–12 to tie for the conference title and receive the Rose Bowl bid. (Ohio State was ineligible anyway because of the Big Ten's "no repeat" rule, which was rescinded in 1971.)

Just days before the Rose Bowl, first-year head coach Bo Schembechler, age forty, suffered a mild heart attack and had to miss the game; defensive coordinator Jim Young was the acting head coach.

=== USC ===
Aided by a pass interference penalty on fourth down followed by a controversial last-minute touchdown, USC earned the Rose Bowl berth with a 14–12 win over rival UCLA in their regular season finale. The only blemish on their record was a 14–14 tie at Notre Dame in mid-October. The Trojans were making their record fourth consecutive Rose Bowl appearance, as the Pac-8 did not have a "no repeat" rule.

== Game summary ==
The score was tied at 3–3 at halftime. With three minutes to play in the third quarter, USC quarterback Jimmy Jones threw a 33-yard touchdown pass to Bob Chandler to give the Trojans a 10–3 lead. A scoreless fourth quarter ensured the USC victory.

== Scoring ==
=== First quarter ===
- USC – Ron Ayala 25-yard field goal

=== Second quarter ===
- Michigan – Tim Killian, 20-yard field goal

=== Third quarter ===
- USC – Bob Chandler, 33-yard pass from Jimmy Jones (Ron Ayala kick)

=== Fourth quarter ===
- No scoring

== Statistics ==
Statistics	USC	Michigan
First downs	16	20
Rushing yards	195	162
Passing yards	128	127
Passes	10–18–0	14–32–1
Total yards	323	289
Punts–average	5–41	6–36
Fumbles lost	0	0
Turnovers by	0	1
Yards penalized	38	20

== Aftermath ==
- USC finished the year undefeated with one tie, earning a #3 ranking behind undefeated and untied #1 Texas and #2 Penn State.
- Chandler went on to play in the NFL for 11 years with the Buffalo Bills and the Oakland Raiders.
- Michigan finished 8–3 and was ranked 9th in the AP poll (released in January) and 8th in the UPI poll (released after the regular season in early December).
