= 1969 Big Ten Conference football season =

- Sport: American football
- Teams: 10
- Top draft pick: Mike Phipps
- Co-champions: Michigan; Ohio State
- Runners-up: Purdue
- Season MVP: Mike Phipps

Seasons
- 1968 1970

1969 Big Ten Conference football standings
	Conf.					Overall
Team	W		L		T	W		L		T
No. 4 Ohio State +	6	–	1	–	0	8	–	1	–	0
No. 9 Michigan +	6	–	1	–	0	8	–	3	–	0
No. 18 Purdue	5	–	2	–	0	8	–	2	–	0
Minnesota	4	–	3	–	0	4	–	5	–	1
Iowa	3	–	4	–	0	5	–	5	–	0
Indiana	3	–	4	–	0	4	–	6	–	0
Northwestern	3	–	4	–	0	3	–	7	–	0
Wisconsin	3	–	4	–	0	3	–	7	–	0
Michigan State	2	–	5	–	0	4	–	6	–	0
Illinois	0	–	7	–	0	0	–	10	–	0
+ – Conference co-champions; Rankings from AP Poll

The 1969 Big Ten Conference football season was the 74th season of college football played by the member schools of the Big Ten Conference and was a part of the 1969 NCAA University Division football season.

The 1969 Michigan Wolverines football team, in the program's first year under head coach Bo Schembechler, was ranked No. 9 in the final AP Poll. The 1969 Michigan vs. Ohio State football game was considered one of the biggest upsets in college football history, as Ohio State came into the game with an 8–0 record, a 22-game winning streak and the No. 1 ranking in the polls. Michigan defeated Ohio State, 24–12, to win the Big Ten's berth in the 1970 Rose Bowl, where they lost to USC. Michigan tight end Jim Mandich and defensive back Tom Curtis were consensus first-team All-Americans. Mandich was selected as the team's most valuable player.

The 1969 Ohio State Buckeyes football team, under head coach Woody Hayes, was ranked No. 1 in the AP Poll every week until losing to Michigan in the final game of the regular season. After the loss to Michigan, the Buckeyes dropped to No. 4 in the final AP Poll. Defensive back Jack Tatum, running back Jim Otis, and middle guard Jim Stillwagon were consensus first-team All-Americans. Otis was selected as the team's most valuable player.

The 1969 Purdue Boilermakers football team, in its final season under head coach Jack Mollenkopf, compiled an 8–2 record and was ranked No. 18 in the final polls. Quarterback Mike Phipps totaled 2,527 passing yards, won the Chicago Tribune Silver Football trophy as the conference's most valuable player, was selected as the consensus first-team All-American quarterback, received the Sammy Baugh Trophy as the nation's top collegiate passer, and finished second in the voting for the 1969 Heisman Trophy.

== Season overview ==
=== Results and team statistics ===
Conf. Rank	Team	Head coach	AP final	AP high	Overall record	Conf. record	PPG	PAG	MVP
1 (tie)	Ohio State	Woody Hayes	#4	#1	8–1	6–1	**42.6**	10.3	Jim Otis
1 (tie)	Michigan	Bo Schembechler	#9	#7	8–3	6–1	32.0	13.5	Jim Mandich
3	Purdue	Jack Mollenkopf	#18	#8	8–2	5–2	35.4	26.4	**Mike Phipps**
4	Minnesota	Murray Warmath	NR	#19	4–5–1	4–3	21.0	26.0	Ray Parson
5 (tie)	Iowa	Ray Nagel	NR	NR	5–5	3–4	25.5	27.5	Larry Ely
5 (tie)	Indiana	John Pont	NR	#10	4–6	3–4	25.2	24.2	John Isenbarger
5 (tie)	Northwestern	Alex Agase	NR	NR	3-7	3-4	13.7	30.6	Don Ross
5 (tie)	Wisconsin	John Coatta	NR	NR	3–7	3–4	19.6	34.9	Stu Voigt
9	Michigan State	Duffy Daugherty	NR	#12	4–6	2–5	20.2	23.1	Ron Saul
10	Illinois	Jim Valek	NR	NR	0–10	0–7	10.6	39.7	Doug Dieken

Key
AP final = Team's rank in the final AP Poll of the 1969 season
AP high = Team's highest rank in the AP Poll throughout the 1969 season
PPG = Average of points scored per game; conference leader's average displayed in bold
PAG = Average of points allowed per game; conference leader's average displayed in bold
MVP = Most valuable player as voted by players on each team as part of the voting process to determine the winner of the Chicago Tribune Silver Football trophy; trophy winner in bold

=== Preseason ===
On December 24, 1968, the University of Michigan announced that head football coach Bump Elliott would assume a new job as associate athletic director and that a new football coach was being sought. Two days later, the university announced that Bo Schembechler had been hired as Elliott's replacement.

=== Regular season ===
==== September 20 ====
Date	Visiting team	Home team	Site	Result	Attendance	Ref.
September 20	No. 19 Minnesota	Arizona State	Sun Devil Stadium • Tempe, AZ	**L** 26–48	50,202	
September 20	No. 14 Indiana	Kentucky	McLean Stadium • Lexington, KY (rivalry)	**W** 58–30	37,500–38,000	
September 20	Vanderbilt	Michigan	Michigan Stadium • Ann Arbor, MI	**W** 42–14	70,183	
September 20	Washington	No. 12 Michigan State	Spartan Stadium • East Lansing, MI	**W** 27–11	63,022	
September 20	Northwestern	No. 11 Notre Dame	Notre Dame Stadium • Notre Dame, IN (rivalry)	**L** 10–35	59,075	
September 20	No. 6 Oklahoma	Wisconsin	Camp Randall Stadium • Madison, WI	**L** 21–48	43,633	
September 20	Oregon State	Iowa	Iowa Stadium • Iowa City, IA	**L** 14–42	51,800	
September 20	No. 18 Purdue	TCU	Amon G. Carter Stadium • Fort Worth, TX	**W** 42–35	25,000	
September 20	Washington State	Illinois	Memorial Stadium • Champaign, IL	**L** 18–19	40,345	
^{#}Rankings from AP Poll. All times are in Eastern Standard Time.

==== September 27 ====
Date	Visiting team	Home team	Site	Result	Attendance	Ref.
September 27	California	No. 10 Indiana	Seventeenth Street Stadium • Bloomington, IN	**L** 14–17	52,904	
September 27	Washington State	Iowa	Iowa Stadium • Iowa City, IA	**W** 61–35	43,241	
September 27	Washington	No. 20 Michigan	Michigan Stadium • Ann Arbor, MI	**W** 45–7	49,684	
September 27	SMU	No. 13 Michigan State	Spartan Stadium • East Lansing, MI	**W** 23–15	72,189	
September 27	Illinois	No. 11 Missouri	Busch Memorial Stadium • St. Louis, MO (rivalry)	**L** 6–37	48,740	
September 27	Ohio	Minnesota	Memorial Stadium • Minneapolis, MN	**T** 35–35	41,235	
September 27	TCU	No. 1 Ohio State	Ohio Stadium • Columbus, OH	**W** 62–0	86,412	
September 27	No. 9 Notre Dame	No. 16 Purdue	Ross–Ade Stadium • West Lafayette, IN (rivalry)	**W** 28–14	68,179	
September 27	Northwestern	No. 5 USC	Los Angeles Memorial Coliseum • Los Angeles, CA	**L** 6–48	56,589	
September 27	No. 14 UCLA	Wisconsin	Camp Randall Stadium • Madison, WI	**L** 23–34	49,243	
^{#}Rankings from AP Poll. All times are in Eastern Standard Time.

==== October 4 ====
Date	Visiting team	Home team	Site	Result	Attendance	Ref.
October 4	Indiana	Colorado	Folsom Field • Boulder, CO	**L** 7–30	31,354	
October 4	Arizona	Iowa	Iowa Stadium • Iowa City, IA	**W** 31–19	47,391	
October 4	Iowa State	Illinois	Memorial Stadium • Champaign, IL	**L** 20–48	37,663	
October 4	No. 9 Missouri	No. 13 Michigan	Michigan Stadium • Ann Arbor, MI	**L** 17–40	64,476	
October 4	Nebraska	Minnesota	Memorial Stadium • Minneapolis, MN (rivalry)	**L** 14–42	52,136	
October 4	No. 14 Michigan State	Notre Dame	Notre Dame Stadium • South Bend, IN (rivalry)	**L** 28–42	59,075	
October 4	No. 1 Ohio State	Washington	Husky Stadium • Seattle, WA	**W** 41–14	58,000	
October 4	No. 17 Stanford	No. 8 Purdue	Ross–Ade Stadium • West Lafayette, IN	**W** 36–35	65,472	
October 4	Syracuse	Wisconsin	Camp Randall Stadium • Madison, WI	**L** 7–43	45,540	
October 4	No. 11 UCLA	Northwestern	Dyche Stadium • Evanston, IL	**L** 0–36	41,015	
^{#}Rankings from AP Poll. All times are in Eastern Standard Time.

==== October 11 ====
Date	Visiting team	Home team	Site	Result	Attendance	Ref.
October 11	Minnesota	Indiana	Seventeenth Street Stadium • Bloomington, IN	**IND** 17–7	52,804	
October 11	No. 9 Purdue	Michigan	Michigan Stadium • Ann Arbor, MI	**MICH** 31–20	80,411	
October 11	Northwestern	Illinois	Memorial Stadium • Champaign, IL (rivalry)	**NW** 10–6	43,928	
October 11	No. 19 Michigan State	No. 1 Ohio State	Ohio Stadium • Columbus, OH	**OHST** 54–21	86,641	
October 11	Iowa	Wisconsin	Camp Randall Stadium • Madison, WI (rivalry)	**WIS** 23–17	53,714	
^{#}Rankings from AP Poll. All times are in Eastern Standard Time.

==== October 18 ====
Date	Visiting team	Home team	Site	Result	Attendance	Ref.
October 18	Illinois	Indiana	Seventeenth Street Stadium • Bloomington, IN (rivalry)	**IND** 41–20	51,812	
October 18	No. 13 Michigan	Michigan State	Spartan Stadium • East Lansing, MI (rivalry)	**MSU** 23–12	79,368	
October 18	Wisconsin	Northwestern	Dyche Stadium • Evanston, IL	**NW** 27–7	34,374	
October 18	No. 1 Ohio State	Minnesota	Memorial Stadium • Minneapolis, MN	**OHST** 34–7	53,016	
October 18	Iowa	No. 17 Purdue	Ross–Ade Stadium • West Lafayette, IN	**PUR** 35–31	65,971	
^{#}Rankings from AP Poll. All times are in Eastern Standard Time.

==== October 25 ====
Date	Visiting team	Home team	Site	Result	Attendance	Ref.
October 25	Michigan State	Iowa	Iowa Stadium • Iowa City, IA	**IOWA** 19–18	56,471	
October 25	Michigan	Minnesota	Memorial Stadium • Minneapolis, MN (Little Brown Jug)	**MICH** 35–9	44,028	
October 25	Illinois	No. 1 Ohio State	Ohio Stadium • Columbus, OH (Illibuck)	**OHST** 41–0	86,576	
October 25	Northwestern	No. 15 Purdue	Ross–Ade Stadium • West Lafayette, IN	**PUR** 45–20	66,103	
October 25	Indiana	Wisconsin	Camp Randall Stadium • Madison, WI	**WIS** 36–34	58,636	
^{#}Rankings from AP Poll. All times are in Eastern Standard Time.

==== November 1 ====
Date	Visiting team	Home team	Site	Result	Attendance	Ref.
November 1	Indiana	Michigan State	Spartan Stadium • East Lansing, MI (rivalry)	**IND** 16–0	77,533	
November 1	Wisconsin	No. 20 Michigan	Michigan Stadium • Ann Arbor, MI	**MICH** 35–7	60,438	
November 1	Minnesota	Iowa	Iowa Stadium • Iowa City, IA (rivalry)	**MINN** 35–8	56,413	
November 1	No. 1 Ohio State	Northwestern	Dyche Stadium • Evanston, IL	**OHST** 35–6	41,279	
November 1	No. 13 Purdue	Illinois	Memorial Stadium • Champaign, IL (rivalry)	**PUR** 49–22	51,299	
^{#}Rankings from AP Poll. All times are in Eastern Standard Time.

==== November 8 ====
Date	Visiting team	Home team	Site	Result	Attendance	Ref.
November 8	Iowa	Indiana	Seventeenth Street Stadium • Bloomington, IN	**IOWA** 28–17	52,854	
November 8	No. 18 Michigan	Illinois	Memorial Stadium • Champaign, IL (rivalry)	**MICH** 57–0	35,270	
November 8	Northwestern	Minnesota	Memorial Stadium • Minneapolis, MN	**MINN** 28–21	41,576	
November 8	Wisconsin	No. 1 Ohio State	Ohio Stadium • Columbus, OH	**OHST** 62–7	86,519	
November 8	Michigan State	No. 10 Purdue	Ross–Ade Stadium • West Lafayette, IN	**PUR** 41–13	67,397	
^{#}Rankings from AP Poll. All times are in Eastern Standard Time.

==== November 15 ====
Date	Visiting team	Home team	Site	Result	Attendance	Ref.
November 15	No. 14 Michigan	Iowa	Iowa Stadium • Iowa City, IA	**MICH** 51–6	45,981	
November 15	Minnesota	Michigan State	Spartan Stadium • East Lansing, MI	**MINN** 14–10	60,011	
November 15	Indiana	Northwestern	Dyche Stadium • Evanston, IL	**NW** 30–27	31,649	
November 15	No. 10 Purdue	No. 1 Ohio State	Ohio Stadium • Columbus, OH	**OHST** 42–14	85,027	
November 15	Illinois	Wisconsin	Camp Randall Stadium • Madison, WI	**WIS** 55–14	42,624	
^{#}Rankings from AP Poll. All times are in Eastern Standard Time.

==== November 22 ====
Date	Visiting team	Home team	Site	TV	Result	Attendance	Ref.
November 22	Iowa	Illinois	Memorial Stadium • Champaign, IL		**IOWA** 40–0	30,257	
November 22	No. 1 Ohio State	No. 12 Michigan	Michigan Stadium • Ann Arbor, MI (The Game)	ABC	**MICH** 24–12	103,588	
November 22	Michigan State	Northwestern	Dyche Stadium • Evanston, IL		**MSU** 39–7	25,606	
November 22	Wisconsin	Minnesota	Memorial Stadium • Minneapolis, MN (rivalry)		**MINN** 35–10	40,458	
November 22	No. 17 Purdue	Indiana	Seventeenth Street Stadium • Bloomington, IN (Old Oaken Bucket)		**PUR** 44–21	56,223	
^{#}Rankings from AP Poll. All times are in Eastern Standard Time.

=== Bowl games ===
On January 1, 1970, Michigan lost to USC, 10–3, at the Rose Bowl in Pasadena, California. The score was tied, 3–3, at halftime. With three minutes to play in the third quarter, USC quarterback Jimmy Jones threw a 33-yard touchdown pass to Bob Chandler to give the Trojans the 10–3 victory. Michigan head coach Bo Schembechler suffered a heart attack the night before the game and was in the hospital during the game. Defensive coordinator Jim Young assumed the coaching responsibilities for the game.

== Statistical leaders ==
The Big Ten's individual statistical leaders include the following:

=== Passing yards ===
1. Mike Phipps, Purdue (2,527)
2. Larry Lawrence, Iowa (1,680)
3. Harry Gonso, Indiana (1,336)
4. Maurie Daigneau, Northwestern (1,276)
5. Phil Hagen, Minnesota (1,266)

=== Rushing yards ===
1. John Isenbarger, Indiana (1,217)
2. Jim Otis, Ohio State (1,027)
3. Don Highsmith, Michigan State (937)
4. Alan Thompson, Wisconsin (907)
5. Billy Taylor, Michigan (864)

=== Receiving yards ===
1. Kerry Reardon, Iowa (738)
2. Stan Brown, Purdue (725)
3. Ashley Bell, Purdue (669)
4. Jim Mandich, Michigan (662)
5. Jade Butcher, Indiana (552)

=== Total yards ===
1. Mike Phipps, Purdue (2,745)
2. Larry Lawrence, Iowa (2,086)
3. Don Moorhead, Michigan (1,886)
4. Rex Kern, Ohio State (1,585)
5. Harry Gonso, Indiana (1,573)

=== Point scored ===
1. Jim Otis, Ohio State (96)
1. Stan Brown, Purdue (96)
3. Garvie Craw, Michigan (78)
4. Ashley Bell, Purdue (66)
5. Jade Butcher, Indiana (60)

== Awards and honors ==
=== All-Big Ten honors ===
The following players were picked by the Associated Press (AP) and/or the United Press International (UPI) as first-team players on the 1969 All-Big Ten Conference football team.

Offense

Position	Name	Team	Selectors
Quarterback	Mike Phipps	Purdue	AP, UPI
Running back	John Isenbarger	Indiana	AP, UPI
Running back	Jim Otis	Ohio State	AP, UPI
Running back	Mike Adamle	Northwestern	AP
Running back	Billy Taylor	Michigan	UPI
End	Jim Mandich	Michigan	AP, UPI
End	Ray Parson	Minnesota	AP
End	Jade Butcher	Indiana	UPI
Tackle	Dan Dierdorf	Michigan	AP, UPI
Tackle	Paul DeNuccio	Purdue	AP
Tackle	Charles Hutchison	Ohio State	UPI
Guard	Ron Saul	Michigan State	AP, UPI
Guard	Don DeSalle	Indiana	AP
Guard	Jon Meskimen	Iowa	UPI
Center	Brian Donovan	Ohio State	AP
Center	Guy Murdock	Michigan	UPI

Defense

Position	Name	Team	Selectors
Defensive end	Dave Whitfield	Ohio State	AP, UPI
Defensive end	Mark Debeve	Ohio State	AP
Defensive end	Rich Saul	Michigan State	UPI
Defensive tackle	Paul Schmidlin	Ohio State	AP, UPI
Defensive tackle	Ron Curl	Michigan State	AP
Defensive tackle	Bill Yanchar	Purdue	UPI
Middle guard	Jim Stillwagon	Ohio State	AP, UPI
Linebacker	Veno Paraskevas	Purdue	AP, UPI
Linebacker	Jack Tatum	Ohio State	AP, UPI [def. back]
Linebacker	Marty Huff	Michigan	AP
Linebacker	Doug Adams	Ohio State	UPI
Defensive back	Tom Curtis	Michigan	AP, UPI
Defensive back	Ted Provost	Ohio State	AP, UPI
Defensive back	Mike Sensibaugh	Ohio State	AP, UPI

=== All-American honors ===
At the end of the 1969 season, Big Ten players secured six of the consensus first-team picks for the 1969 College Football All-America Team. The Big Ten's consensus All-American was:

Position	Name	Team	Selectors
Defensive back	Jack Tatum	Ohio State	AFCA, AP, CP, FWAA, NEA [cornerback], UPI, FN, TSN, WCFF
Tight end	Jim Mandich	Michigan	AFCA [end], AP, CP [end], FWAA, NEA, UPI [end], FN, Time, WCFF
Quarterback	Mike Phipps	Purdue	AFCA, AP, CP, FWAA, NEA, UPI, FN, Time, TSN, WCFF
Running back	Jim Otis	Ohio State	AP [fullback], CP [fullback], FWAA, UPI, FN, WCFF
Middle guard	Jim Stillwagon	Ohio State	AFCA, AP, CP, NEA, UPI, FN, WCFF
Defensive back	Tom Curtis	Michigan	AP, CP, UPI, FN, WCFF

Other Big Ten players who were named first-team All-Americans by at least one selector were:

Position	Name	Team	Selectors
Offensive guard	Ron Saul	Michigan State	CP, NEA, Time, TSN
Offensive guard	Chuck Hutchison	Ohio State	Time
Running back	Rex Kern	Ohio State	CP, FN
Running back	John Isenbarger	Indiana	FN
Defensive back	Ted Provost	Ohio State	Time, TSN
Defensive back	Tim Foley	Purdue	Time

=== Other awards ===
Purdue quarterback Mike Phipps received the Sammy Baugh Trophy as the nation's top collegiate passer. He also finished second in the voting for the Heisman Trophy.
