= 1969 Ohio State Buckeyes football team =

American college football season

1969 Ohio State Buckeyes football
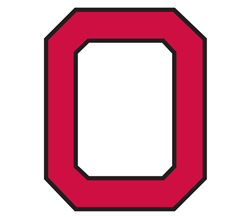

Big Ten co-champion
- Conference: Big Ten Conference

Ranking
- Coaches: No. 5
- AP: No. 4
- Record: 8–1 (6–1 Big Ten)
- Head coach: Woody Hayes (19th season)
- MVP: Jim Otis
- Captains: Alan Jack; Dave Whitfield
- Home stadium: Ohio Stadium

1969 Big Ten Conference football standings
	Conf.					Overall
Team	W		L		T	W		L		T
No. 4 Ohio State +	6	–	1	–	0	8	–	1	–	0
No. 9 Michigan +	6	–	1	–	0	8	–	3	–	0
No. 18 Purdue	5	–	2	–	0	8	–	2	–	0
Minnesota	4	–	3	–	0	4	–	5	–	1
Iowa	3	–	4	–	0	5	–	5	–	0
Indiana	3	–	4	–	0	4	–	6	–	0
Northwestern	3	–	4	–	0	3	–	7	–	0
Wisconsin	3	–	4	–	0	3	–	7	–	0
Michigan State	2	–	5	–	0	4	–	6	–	0
Illinois	0	–	7	–	0	0	–	10	–	0
+ – Conference co-champions; Rankings from AP Poll

The 1969 Ohio State Buckeyes football team was an American football team that represented the Ohio State University as a member of the Big Ten Conference during the 1969 Big Ten season. In their 19th year under head coach Woody Hayes, and as defending national champion, the Buckeyes compiled an 8–1 record (6–1 in conference games), tied with Michigan for the Big Ten championship, and outscored opponents by a total of 383 to 93. The Buckeyes were ranked No. 1 in the AP poll from the start of the season, but dropped to No. 4 after losing the 1969 Ohio State vs. Michigan football game on November 22. The loss to Michigan snapped a 22-game winning streak dating to November 4, 1967. Hayes called his 1969 squad "the best team we ever put together, probably the best team that ever played college football."

The team tallied an average of 308.2 rushing yards and 185.0 passing yards per game. On defense, they held opponents to 98.1 rushing yards and 176.3 passing yards per game. the team's individual statistical leaders included quarterback Rex Kern (1,002 passing yards, 50.4% completion percentage), running back Jim Otis (1,027 rushing yards, 4.5 yards per carry, 16 touchdowns), and Bruce Jankowski (23 receptions for 404 yards). Six Ohio State players received first-team honors on the 1969 All-America team. Three of the Buckeyes (Otis, Jim Tatum, and Jim Stillwagon) were consensus All-Americans. Eleven Buckeyes received first-team honors on the 1969 All-Big Ten Conference football team.

The Buckeyes played their home games at Ohio Stadium in Columbus, Ohio.

== Schedule ==
Date	Time	Opponent	Rank	Site	TV	Result	Attendance	Source
September 27	1:30 p.m.	TCU*	No. 1	Ohio Stadium; Columbus, OH		W 62–0	86,412	
October 4	4:30 p.m.	at Washington*	No. 1	Husky Stadium; Seattle, WA		W 41–14	58,000	
October 11	1:30 p.m.	No. 19 Michigan State	No. 1	Ohio Stadium; Columbus, OH		W 54–21	86,641	
October 18	2:30 p.m.	at Minnesota	No. 1	Memorial Stadium; Minneapolis, MN		W 34–7	53,016	
October 25	1:30 p.m.	Illinois	No. 1	Ohio Stadium; Columbus, OH (Illibuck)		W 41–0	86,576	
November 1	2:30 p.m.	at Northwestern	No. 1	Dyche Stadium; Evanston, IL	ABC	W 35–6	41,279	
November 8	1:30 p.m.	Wisconsin	No. 1	Ohio Stadium; Columbus, OH		W 62–7	86,519	
November 15	1:30 p.m.	No. 10 Purdue	No. 1	Ohio Stadium; Columbus, OH	ABC	W 42–14	85,027	
November 22	1:00 p.m.	at No. 12 Michigan	No. 1	Michigan Stadium; Ann Arbor, MI (rivalry)	ABC	L 12–24	103,588	
*Non-conference game; Rankings from AP Poll released prior to the game; All times are in Eastern time

== Game summaries ==
=== TCU ===
Team	1	2	3	4	Total
TCU	0	0	0	0	0
• Ohio St	19	14	14	15	62

- Date: September 27
- Location: Ohio Stadium
- Game start: 1:30 p.m.
- Elapsed time: 2:13
- Game attendance: 86,412
- Game weather: Rain; 63 °F (17 °C); wind 7 mph SE

Scoring summary
Q1	13:47	OHST	Jankowski 58 yard pass from Kern (White kick)	OHST 7–0
Q1	8:34	OHST	Otis 1 yard run (kick failed)	OHST 13–0
Q1	3:32	OHST	Brockington 1 yard run (kick blocked)	OHST 19–0
Q2	8:15	OHST	Otis 8 yard run (White kick)	OHST 26–0
Q2	5:35	OHST	Brockington 5 yard run (White kick)	OHST 33–0
Q3		OHST	Kern 17 yard run (White kick)	OHST 40–0
Q3		OHST	Kern 5 yard run (White kick)	OHST 47–0
Q4	7:21	OHST	Brockington 2 yard run (Brockington run)	OHST 55–0
Q4	:16	OHST	Campagna 62 yard pass from Rusnak (White kick)	OHST 62–0

- Jim Otis 27 Rush, 121 Yds
- Ohio State's biggest win since 1957 versus Indiana and most points scored in a game since 1950 versus Iowa.

=== Washington ===
Team	1	2	3	4	Total
• Ohio St	14	7	14	6	41
Washington	0	7	0	7	14

- Date: October 4
- Location: Husky Stadium, Seattle, WA
- Game attendance: 58,000

Scoring summary
Q1	OHST	Kern 64 yard run (White kick)	OHST 7–0
Q1	OHST	Otis 1 yard run (White kick)	OHST 14–0
Q2	OHST	Otis 3 yard run (White kick)	OHST 21–0
Q2	WASH	Willis 1 yard run (Volbrecht kick)	OHST 21–7
Q3	OHST	Otis 1 yard run (White kick)	OHST 28–7
Q3	OHST	Kern 4 yard run (White kick)	OHST 35–7
Q4	OHST	Maciejowski 5 yard run (kick failed)	OHST 41–7
Q4	WASH	Kennamer 6 yard run (Warner kick)	OHST 41–14

=== Michigan State ===
Team	1	2	3	4	Total
Michigan State	7	7	0	7	21
• Ohio St	27	7	6	14	54

- Date: October 11
- Location: Ohio Stadium
- Game start: 1:31 p.m. EST
- Elapsed time: 2:28
- Game attendance: 86,641
- Game weather: Cloudy 74 °F (23 °C)

Scoring summary
Q1	12:42	OHST	Debevc 14 yard interception (White kick)	OHST 7–0
Q1	8:54	OHST	Kern 1 yard rush (White kick)	OHST 14–0
Q1	6:45	OHST	Zelina 73 punt return (Kick failed)	OHST 20–0
Q1	5:47	MSU	Triplett 76 yard pass to Foreman (Boyce kick)	OHST 20–7
Q1	1:40	OHST	Kern 4 yard rush (White kick)	OHST 27–7
Q2	3:14	MSU	Triplett 40 yard pass to Foreman (Boyce kick)	OHST 27–14
Q2	0:30	OHST	Kern 24 yard pass to White (White kick)	OHST 34–14
Q3	4:10	OHST	Kern 14 yard pass toJankowski (Kick failed)	OHST 40–14
Q4	12:31	MSU	Highsmith 3 yard rush (Boyce kick)	OHST 42–21
Q4	11:18	OHST	Kern 29 yard pass to Campana (White kick)	OHST 49–21
Q4	0:40	OHST	Kern 5 yard pass to Campana (White kick)	OHST 54–21

- Attendance: 86,641 (record)
- Rex Kern 10/21, 187 Yds, 2 TD, 2 rush TD (left early in 4th)

=== Minnesota ===
Team	1	2	3	4	Total
• Ohio St	14	6	0	14	34
Minnesota	0	0	7	0	7

- Date: October 18
- Location: Memorial Stadium, Minneapolis
- Game start: 1:30 p.m.
- Elapsed time: 2:18
- Game attendance: 53,016
- Game weather: 55 degrees, windy 20 mph SW

Scoring summary
Q1	OHST	Otis 8 yard run (kick failed)	OHST 6–0
Q1	OHST	Otis 2 yard run (Kern pass to Zelina)	OHST 14–0
Q2	OHST	Rusnak 25 yard pass to Jankowski (kick failed)	OHST 20–0
Q3	MINN	Carter 6 yard run (Nygren kick)	OHST 20–7
Q4	OHST	Hayden 7 yard run (White kick)	OHST 27–7
Q4	OHST	Gillian 1 yard run (Warner kick)	OHST 34–7

=== Illinois ===
Team	1	2	3	4	Total
Illinois	0	0	0	0	0
• Ohio St	7	14	7	13	41

- Date: October 25
- Location: Ohio Stadium
- Game start: 1:30 p.m. EST
- Elapsed time: 2:12
- Game attendance: 86,576
- Game weather: Sunny, 56 °F (13 °C)

Scoring summary
Q1	7:17	OHST	Otis 1 yard run (White kick)	OHST 7–0
Q2	8:22	OHST	Kern 10 yard pass to White (White kick)	OHST 14–0
Q2	1:09	OHST	Kern 15 yard pass to White (White kick)	OHST 21–0
Q3	0:50	OHST	Kern 4 yard run (White kick)	OHST 28–0
Q4	9:16	OHST	Brockington 2 yard run (White kick)	OHST 35–0
Q4	3:47	OHST	Brockington 1 yard trun (Kick failed)	OHST 41–0

=== Northwestern ===
Team	1	2	3	4	Total
• Ohio State	7	14	7	7	35
Northwestern	0	0	0	6	6

- Date: November 1
- Location: Dyche Stadium, Evanston, Illinois
- Game attendance: 41,279
- Game weather: Cloudy

Scoring summary
Q1	0:42	OSU	Otis 1 yard run (White kick)	OSU 7–0
Q2	6:09	OSU	Kern 21 yard pass to White (White kick)	OSU 14–0
Q2	2:00	OSU	Otis 1 yard run (White kick)	OSU 21–0
Q3	10:23	OSU	Hayden 33 yard run (White kick)	OSU 28–0
Q1	6:13	OSU	Maciejowski 12 yard pass to Otis (White kick)	OSU 35–0
Q4	3:57	NW	Hudson 10 yard run (Kick failed)	OSU 35–6

=== Wisconsin ===
Team	1	2	3	4	Total
Wisconsin	0	0	0	7	7
• Ohio State	21	13	7	21	62

- Date: November 8
- Location: Ohio Stadium
- Game start: 1:31p.m. EST
- Elapsed time: 2:20
- Game attendance: 86,519
- Game weather: Cloudy, 48 °F (9 °C); Wind NE 12-15 mph

Scoring summary
Q1	9:54	OSU	Maciejowski 31 yard pass to Jankowski (White kick)	OSU 7–0
Q1	1:12	OSU	Otis 1 yard run (White kick)	OSU 14–0
Q1	0:24	OSU	Maciejowski 19 yard pass to Kuhn (White kick)	OSU 21–0
Q2	9:33	OSU	Otis 1 yard run (Kick failed)	OSU 27–0
Q2	0:26	OSU	Otis 1 yard run (White kick)	OSU 34–0
Q3	5:53	OSU	Rusnak 5 yard pass to Kuhn (White kick)	OSU 41–0
Q4	14:21	OSU	Rusnak 5 yard pass to Campana (White kick)	OSU 48–0
Q4	6:56	OSU	Brockington 1 yard run (White kick)	OSU 55–0
Q4	4:51	WIS	Losse 14 yard pass to Reddick (Yaeger kick)	OSU 55–7
Q4	1:22	OSU	Colburn 5 yard run (Johnston kick)	OSU 62–7

=== Purdue ===
Team	1	2	3	4	Total
Purdue	0	7	0	7	14
• Ohio St	6	22	14	0	42

- Date: November 15
- Location: Ohio Stadium
- Game start: 1:30 p.m. EST
- Elapsed time: 2:29
- Game attendance: 85,027
- Game weather: Snow; 23 °F (−5 °C); wind 15–20 mph SW
- TV announcers (ABC): Chris Schenkel, Bud Wilkinson

Scoring summary
Q1	2:56	OHST	Kern 6 yard run (kick blocked)	OHST 6–0
Q2	9:47	OHST	White 33 yard field goal	OHST 9–0
Q2	5:32	OHST	Otis 5 yard run (kick failed)	OHST 15–0
Q2	3:44	OHST	Kern 1 yard run (White kick)	OHST 22–0
Q2	:52	OHST	Jankowski 38 yard pass from Kern (kick blocked)	OHST 28–0
Q2	:39	PUR	Brown 98 yard kickoff return (Jones kick)	OHST 28–7
Q3	13:08	OHST	Hayden 4 yard run (White kick)	OHST 35–7
Q3	10:58	OHST	Zelina 57 yard punt return (White kick)	OHST 42–7
Q4	1:12	PUR	Bell 3 yard pass from Phipps (Jones kick)	OHST 42–14

=== Michigan ===
#1 Ohio State Buckeyes (8–0) at #12 Michigan Wolverines (7–2)

Quarter	1	2	3	4	Total
Ohio St	6	6	0	0	12
Michigan	7	17	0	0	24

at Michigan Stadium • Ann Arbor, Michigan

- Date: November 22
- Game time: 1:30 p.m.
- Game weather: Sunny • 45 °F (7 °C)
- Game attendance: 103,588
- Referee: Jerry Markbreit
- TV announcers (ABC): Bill Flemming and Lee Grosscup

Game information

Ohio St

- Rex Kern
  6/17, 88 Yds, TD, 4 INT
- Jim Otis
  28 Rush, 144 Yds, TD
- Jan White
  3 Rec, 62 Yds, TD

Michigan

- Don Moorhead
  10/20, 108 Yds, INT
- Billy Taylor
  23 Rush, 84 Yds
- Jim Mandich
  6 Rec, 78 Yds

Scoring summary

Quarter	Time	Drive			Team	Scoring information	Score	
Quarter	Time	Plays	Yards	TOP	Team	Scoring information	OSU	MICH
1	7:38	5	16		Ohio St	Otis 1-yard touchdown run, S. White kick no good	6	0
1	3:35	10	55		Michigan	Craw 2-yard touchdown run, Titas kick good	6	7
2	14:52	10	74		Ohio St	J. White 22-yard touchdown reception from Rex Kern, 2-point run failed	12	7
2	11:54	9	77		Michigan	Craw 1-yard touchdown run, Titas kick good	12	14
2	10:10	2	3		Michigan	Moorhead 2-yard touchdown run, Titas kick good	12	21
2	1:15	16	72		Michigan	25-yard field goal by Killian	12	24
"TOP" = time of possession. For other American football terms, see Glossary of American football.							12	24

== Personnel ==
=== Coaching staff ===
- Woody Hayes – head coach (19th year)
- Earle Bruce – offense (4th year)
- George Chaump – offense (2nd year)
- Hugh Hindman – offense (7th year)
- Rudy Hubbard – running backs (2nd year)
- Dave McClain – (1st year)
- Lou McCullough – defensive coordinator (2nd year)
- John Mummey – quarterbacks (1st year)
- Dick Walker – defensive backs (1st year)

=== Depth chart ===
Defense

FS
Mike Sensibaugh
⋅

LB	LB
Doug Adams	Phil Strickland
Bob Trapuzzano	Mike Radtke

SS
Jack Tatum
⋅

CB
Tim Anderson
Mike Polaski

DE	DT	NT	DT	DE
Mark Debevc	Bill Urbanik	Jim Stillwagon	Paul Schmidlin	Dave Whitfield
Nick Roman	Brad Nielsen	⋅	Ralph Holloway	Ken Luttner

CB
Ted Provost
⋅

Offense

SE
Bruce Jankowski
Jimmie Harris

LT	LG	C	RG	RT
Dave Cheney	Thomas Backhus	Brian Donovan	Alan Jack	Charles Hutchison
Randy Hart	Ted Kurz	Tom DeLeone	⋅	Rick Simon

TE
Jan White
Dick Kuhn

WB
Larry Zelina
Tom Campana

QB
Rex Kern
Ron Maciejowski

FB
Jim Otis
John Brockington

Special teams

RB
Leo Hayden
Ray Gillian

== Awards and honors ==
Six Ohio State players received first-team honors on the 1969 All-America team: Otis (consensus); defensive back Jim Tatum (consensus); middle guard Jim Stillwagon (consensus); Kern (Central Press, Football News); defensive back Ted Provost (Time, The Sporting News); and guard Chuck Hutchison (Time).

Eleven Buckeyes received first-team honors on the 1969 All-Big Ten Conference football team: Otis (AP/UPI); Tatum (AP/UPI); Stillwagon (AP/UPI); Provost (AP/UPI); defensive end Dave Whitfield (AP/UPI); defensive tackle Paul Schmidlin (AP/UPI); defensive back Mike Sensibaugh (AP/UPI); center Brian Donvan (AP); defensive end Mark Debeve (AP); Hutchison (UPI); and linebacker Doug Adams (UPI).

== 1970 NFL draftees ==
Player	Round	Pick	Position	NFL club
Chuck Hutchison	2	38	Guard	St. Louis Cardinals
Ted Provost	7	162	Defensive back	Los Angeles Rams
Jim Otis	9	218	Running back	New Orleans Saints
Nick Roman	10	241	Defensive end	Cincinnati Bengals
