= John Coatta =

American football player, coach, and scout (1929–2000)

Biographical details
- Born: April 5, 1929; Dearborn, Michigan, U.S.
- Died: December 26, 2000 (aged 71); Minnetonka, Minnesota, U.S.

Playing career
- 1949–1951: Wisconsin
- Position: Quarterback

Coaching career (HC unless noted)
- 1959–1964: Florida State (assistant)
- 1965–1966: Wisconsin (assistant)
- 1966–1969: Wisconsin
- 1970–1975: Mankato State
- 1977–1978: Minnesota (OC/QB)

Head coaching record
- Overall: 38–50–3

Accomplishments and honors

Awards
- First-team All-Big Ten (1951)

John Coatta (April 5, 1929 – December 26, 2000) was an American football player, coach, and scout. He served as the head coach at the University of Wisconsin from 1967 to 1969 and at Mankato State College—known as now Minnesota State University, Mankato—from 1970 to 1975, compiling a career head coaching record of 38–50–3. Coatta played quarterback at Wisconsin from 1949 to 1951 and in 1950, he set the Big Ten Conference season pass completion percentage record (64.2%), a mark that he held until 1977.

== Coaching career ==
In 1959, Coatta left private business in Madison, Wisconsin to accept an assistant football coaching job at Florida State University under Perry Moss and subsequently Bill Peterson. From 1959 to 1964, he coached a number of positions at the school. He then returned to Wisconsin as an assistant coach under Milt Bruhn for two seasons after which he was promoted to head coach.

During his head coaching tenure at Wisconsin, Coatta compiled a 3–26–1 (.117) record. He set an National Collegiate Athletic Association (NCAA) record for most consecutive games without a win to begin a career with 23. Coatta did not win a game in his first two seasons. His three wins came in 1969 against Iowa, Indiana, and Illinois. Allegedly, the Badgers passed on future Michigan head coach Bo Schembechler when they hired Coatta. Schembechler was the head coach at Miami University at the time.

After Minnesota State temporarily dropped football after the 1975 season, Coatta joined the staff of Cal Stoll at the University of Minnesota, and served as offensive coordinator and quarterbacks coach from 1977 to 1978. He later scouted for the National Football League's Dallas Cowboys and Seattle Seahawks.

== Head coaching record ==
Year	Team	Overall	Conference	Standing	Bowl/playoffs
Wisconsin Badgers (Big Ten Conference) (1967–1969)
1967	Wisconsin	0–9–1	0–6–1	T–9th	
1968	Wisconsin	0–10	0–7	10th	
1969	Wisconsin	3–7	3–4	T–5th	
Wisconsin:		3–26–1	3–17–1		
Mankato State Indians (NCAA College Division independent) (1970)
1970	Mankato State	7–2–1			
Mankato State Indians (North Central Conference) (1971–1975)
1971	Mankato State	7–3	0–0	NA	
1972	Mankato State	6–5	3–4	T–4th	
1973	Mankato State	7–4	4–3	T–3rd	
1974	Mankato State	5–4–1	3–3–1	T–5th	
1975	Mankato State	3–6	2–5	T–5th	
Mankato State:		35–24–2	12–15–1		
Total:		38–50–3			
