= 1969 Michigan State Spartans football team =

American college football season

1969 Michigan State Spartans football
- Conference: Big Ten Conference
- Record: 4–6 (2–5 Big Ten)
- Head coach: Duffy Daugherty (16th season)
- MVP: Ron Saul
- Captains: Franklin Foreman; Rich Saul
- Home stadium: Spartan Stadium

1969 Big Ten Conference football standings
	Conf.					Overall
Team	W		L		T	W		L		T
No. 4 Ohio State +	6	–	1	–	0	8	–	1	–	0
No. 9 Michigan +	6	–	1	–	0	8	–	3	–	0
No. 18 Purdue	5	–	2	–	0	8	–	2	–	0
Minnesota	4	–	3	–	0	4	–	5	–	1
Iowa	3	–	4	–	0	5	–	5	–	0
Indiana	3	–	4	–	0	4	–	6	–	0
Northwestern	3	–	4	–	0	3	–	7	–	0
Wisconsin	3	–	4	–	0	3	–	7	–	0
Michigan State	2	–	5	–	0	4	–	6	–	0
Illinois	0	–	7	–	0	0	–	10	–	0
+ – Conference co-champions; Rankings from AP Poll

The 1969 Michigan State Spartans football team was an American football team that represented Michigan State University as a member of the Big Ten Conference during the 1969 Big Ten football season. In their 16th season under head coach Duffy Daugherty, the Spartans compiled a 4–6 record (2–5 in conference games), finished ninth in the Big Ten, and were outscored by a total of 231 to 202. They began the season ranked No. 12 in the preseason AP poll but dropped out of the poll after losing to Notre Dame and Ohio State in the third and fourth weeks of the season.

On offense, the Spartans gained an average of 203.1 rushing yards and 123.1 passing yards per game. On defense, they gave up 189.7 rushing yard and 214.7 passing yards per game. The individual statistical leaders included quarterback Bill Triplett with 715 passing yards, halfback Don Highsmith with 937 rushing yards and seven touchdowns, and split end Frank Foreman with 22 receptions and 537 receiving yards.

Four Michigan State players received first- or second-team honors from either the Associated Press (AP) or the United Press International (UPI) on the 1969 All-Big Ten Conference football team: offensive guard Ron Saul (AP-1, UPI-1); defensive tackle Ron Curl (AP-1, UPI-2); defensive end Rich Saul (UPI-1); and linebacker Don Law (AP-2, UPI-2). Ron Saul was selected as the team's most valuable player.

The team played its home games at Spartan Stadium in East Lansing, Michigan.

== Schedule ==
Date	Opponent	Rank	Site	Result	Attendance	Source
September 20	Washington*	No. 12	Spartan Stadium; East Lansing, MI	W 27–11	63,022	
September 27	SMU*	No. 13	Spartan Stadium; East Lansing, MI	W 23–15	72,189	
October 4	at Notre Dame*	No. 14	Notre Dame Stadium; Notre Dame, IN (rivalry)	L 28–42	59,075	
October 11	at No. 1 Ohio State	No. 19	Ohio Stadium; Columbus, OH	L 21–54	86,641	
October 18	No. 13 Michigan		Spartan Stadium; East Lansing, MI (rivalry)	W 23–12	79,368	
October 25	at Iowa		Iowa Stadium; Iowa City, IA	L 18–19	56,471	
November 1	Indiana^{†}		Spartan Stadium; East Lansing, MI (rivalry)	L 0–16	77,533	
November 8	at No. 10 Purdue		Ross–Ade Stadium; West Lafayette, IN	L 13–41	67,397	
November 15	Minnesota		Spartan Stadium; East Lansing, MI	L 10–14	60,011	
November 22	at Northwestern		Dyche Stadium; Evanston, IL	W 39–7	25,606	
*Non-conference game; ^{†}Homecoming; Rankings from AP Poll released prior to the game
