= 1969 Indiana Hoosiers football team =

American college football season

1969 Indiana Hoosiers football
- Conference: Big Ten Conference
- Record: 4–6 (3–4 Big Ten)
- Head coach: John Pont (5th season)
- MVP: John Isenbarger
- Captains: Steve Applegate; Harry Gonso; Karl Pankratz
- Home stadium: Seventeenth Street Stadium

1969 Big Ten Conference football standings
	Conf.					Overall
Team	W		L		T	W		L		T
No. 4 Ohio State +	6	–	1	–	0	8	–	1	–	0
No. 9 Michigan +	6	–	1	–	0	8	–	3	–	0
No. 18 Purdue	5	–	2	–	0	8	–	2	–	0
Minnesota	4	–	3	–	0	4	–	5	–	1
Iowa	3	–	4	–	0	5	–	5	–	0
Indiana	3	–	4	–	0	4	–	6	–	0
Northwestern	3	–	4	–	0	3	–	7	–	0
Wisconsin	3	–	4	–	0	3	–	7	–	0
Michigan State	2	–	5	–	0	4	–	6	–	0
Illinois	0	–	7	–	0	0	–	10	–	0
+ – Conference co-champions; Rankings from AP Poll

The 1969 Indiana Hoosiers football team represented the Indiana Hoosiers in the 1969 Big Ten Conference football season. They participated as members of the Big Ten Conference. The Hoosiers played their home games at Seventeenth Street Stadium in Bloomington, Indiana. The team was coached by John Pont, in his fifth year as head coach of the Hoosiers.

== Schedule ==
Date	Opponent	Rank	Site	TV	Result	Attendance	Source
September 20	at Kentucky*	No. 14	McLean Stadium; Lexington, KY (rivalry)	ABC	W 58–30	37,500–38,000	
September 27	California*	No. 10	Seventeenth Street Stadium; Bloomington, IN		L 14–17	52,904	
October 4	at Colorado*		Folsom Field; Boulder, CO		L 7–30	31,354	
October 11	Minnesota		Seventeenth Street Stadium; Bloomington, IN		W 17–7	52,804	
October 18	Illinois^{†}		Seventeenth Street Stadium; Bloomington, IN (rivalry)		W 41–20	51,812	
October 25	at Wisconsin		Camp Randall Stadium; Madison, WI		L 34–36	58,636	
November 1	at Michigan State		Spartan Stadium; East Lansing, MI (rivalry)		W 16–0	77,533	
November 8	Iowa		Seventeenth Street Stadium; Bloomington, IN	ABC	L 17–28	52,854	
November 15	at Northwestern		Dyche Stadium; Evanston, IL		L 27–30	31,649	
November 22	No. 17 Purdue		Seventeenth Street Stadium; Bloomington, IN (Old Oaken Bucket)		L 21–44	56,223	
*Non-conference game; ^{†}Homecoming; Rankings from AP Poll released prior to the game

== Roster ==
1969 Indiana Hoosiers football team roster
Players
Coaches
Offense

Pos.	#	Name	Class
WR	40	Jade Butcher	Sr
HB	17	John Isenbarger	Sr

Defense

Pos.	#	Name	Class

Special teams

Pos.	#	Name	Class

Head coach

- John Pont

Coordinators/assistant coaches

Legend

- (C) Team captain
- (S) Suspended
- (I) Ineligible
- Injured
- Redshirt

== 1970 NFL draftees ==
Player	Position	Round	Pick	NFL club
John Isenbarger	Running back	2	48	San Francisco 49ers
Jade Butcher	Wide receiver	6	147	Atlanta Falcons
Eric Stolberg	Wide receiver	17	440	Oakland Raiders
