= 1969 Minnesota Golden Gophers football team =

American college football season

1969 Minnesota Golden Gophers football
- Conference: Big Ten Conference
- Record: 4–5–1 (4–3 Big Ten)
- Head coach: Murray Warmath (16th season)
- MVP: Ray Parson
- Captain: Jim Carter
- Home stadium: Memorial Stadium

1969 Big Ten Conference football standings
	Conf.					Overall
Team	W		L		T	W		L		T
No. 4 Ohio State +	6	–	1	–	0	8	–	1	–	0
No. 9 Michigan +	6	–	1	–	0	8	–	3	–	0
No. 18 Purdue	5	–	2	–	0	8	–	2	–	0
Minnesota	4	–	3	–	0	4	–	5	–	1
Iowa	3	–	4	–	0	5	–	5	–	0
Indiana	3	–	4	–	0	4	–	6	–	0
Northwestern	3	–	4	–	0	3	–	7	–	0
Wisconsin	3	–	4	–	0	3	–	7	–	0
Michigan State	2	–	5	–	0	4	–	6	–	0
Illinois	0	–	7	–	0	0	–	10	–	0
+ – Conference co-champions; Rankings from AP Poll

The 1969 Minnesota Golden Gophers football team represented the University of Minnesota in the 1969 Big Ten Conference football season. In their 16th year under head coach Murray Warmath, the Golden Gophers compiled a 4-5-1 record and were outscored by their opponents by a combined total of 257 to 210.

End Ray Paron received the team's Most Valuable Player award. Parson was also named All-Big Ten first team. Linebacker Noel Jenke, halfback Barry Mayer and defensive lineman Leon Trawick were named Academic All-Big Ten. The team included offensive lineman, Richard Fliehr, better known as professional wrestler Ric Flair.

Total attendance at six home games was 272,449, an average of 45,417 per game. The largest crowd was against Ohio State.

== Schedule ==
Date	Time	Opponent	Rank	Site	Result	Attendance	Source
September 20		at Arizona State*	No. 19	Sun Devil Stadium; Tempe, AZ	L 26–48	50,202	
September 27	1:30 p.m.	Ohio*		Memorial Stadium; Minneapolis, MN	T 35–35	41,235	
October 4		Nebraska*		Memorial Stadium; Minneapolis, MN (rivalry)	L 14–42	52,136	
October 11		at Indiana		Seventeenth Street Football Stadium; Bloomington, IN	L 7–17	52,804	
October 18		No. 1 Ohio State^{†}		Memorial Stadium; Minneapolis, MN	L 7–34	53,016	
October 25		Michigan		Memorial Stadium; Minneapolis, MN (Little Brown Jug)	L 9–35	44,028	
November 1		at Iowa		Iowa Stadium; Iowa City, IA (rivalry)	W 35–8	56,413	
November 8		Northwestern		Memorial Stadium; Minneapolis, MN	W 28–21	41,576	
November 15		at Michigan State		Spartan Stadium; East Lansing, MI	W 14–10	60,011	
November 22		Wisconsin		Memorial Stadium; Minneapolis, MN (rivalry)	W 35–10	40,458	
*Non-conference game; ^{†}Homecoming; Rankings from AP Poll released prior to the game; All times are in Central time

== Roster ==
1969 Minnesota Golden Gophers football team roster
Players
Coaches
Offense

Pos.	#	Name	Class
FB	34	Jim Carter	Sr
QB	10	Craig Curry	So

Defense

Pos.	#	Name	Class
DB	27	Jeff Wright	Jr

Special teams

Pos.	#	Name	Class

Head coach

- Murray Warmath

Coordinators/assistant coaches

Legend

- (C) Team captain
- (S) Suspended
- (I) Ineligible
- Injured
- Redshirt

Roster
