= 1969 Purdue Boilermakers football team =

American college football season

1969 Purdue Boilermakers football
- Conference: Big Ten Conference

Ranking
- Coaches: No. 18
- AP: No. 18
- Record: 8–2 (5–2 Big Ten)
- Head coach: Jack Mollenkopf (14th season)
- MVP: Mike Phipps
- Captains: Bill McKoy; Mike Phipps; Bill Yanchar
- Home stadium: Ross–Ade Stadium

1969 Big Ten Conference football standings
	Conf.					Overall
Team	W		L		T	W		L		T
No. 4 Ohio State +	6	–	1	–	0	8	–	1	–	0
No. 9 Michigan +	6	–	1	–	0	8	–	3	–	0
No. 18 Purdue	5	–	2	–	0	8	–	2	–	0
Minnesota	4	–	3	–	0	4	–	5	–	1
Iowa	3	–	4	–	0	5	–	5	–	0
Indiana	3	–	4	–	0	4	–	6	–	0
Northwestern	3	–	4	–	0	3	–	7	–	0
Wisconsin	3	–	4	–	0	3	–	7	–	0
Michigan State	2	–	5	–	0	4	–	6	–	0
Illinois	0	–	7	–	0	0	–	10	–	0
+ – Conference co-champions; Rankings from AP Poll

The 1969 Purdue Boilermakers football team represented Purdue University during the 1969 Big Ten Conference football season. Led by Jack Mollenkopf in his 14th and final season as head coach, the Boilermakers compiled an overall record of 8–2 with a mark of 5–2 in conference play, placing third in the Big Ten. Purdue played home games at Ross–Ade Stadium in West Lafayette, Indiana.

== Schedule ==
Date	Time	Opponent	Rank	Site	Result	Attendance	Source
September 20		at TCU*	No. 18	Amon G. Carter Stadium; Fort Worth, TX	W 42–35	25,000	
September 27		No. 9 Notre Dame*	No. 16	Ross–Ade Stadium; West Lafayette, IN (rivalry)	W 28–14	68,179	
October 4	1:30 p.m.	No. 17 Stanford*	No. 8	Ross–Ade Stadium; West Lafayette, IN	W 36–35	65,472	
October 11		at Michigan	No. 9	Michigan Stadium; Ann Arbor, MI	L 20–31	80,411	
October 18		Iowa	No. 17	Ross–Ade Stadium; West Lafayette, IN	W 35–31	65,971	
October 25		Northwestern^{†}	No. 15	Ross–Ade Stadium; West Lafayette, IN	W 45–20	66,103	
November 1		at Illinois	No. 13	Memorial Stadium; Champaign, IL (rivalry)	W 49–22	51,299	
November 8		Michigan State	No. 10	Ross–Ade Stadium; West Lafayette, IN	W 41–13	67,397	
November 15		at No. 1 Ohio State	No. 10	Ohio Stadium; Columbus, OH	L 14–42	85,027	
November 22		at Indiana	No. 17	Seventeenth Street Stadium; Bloomington, IN (Old Oaken Bucket)	W 44–21	56,223	
*Non-conference game; ^{†}Homecoming; Rankings from AP Poll released prior to the game

== Game summaries ==
=== TCU ===
- Randy Cooper 23 rushes, 117 yards

=== Stanford ===
- Mike Phipps 28/39 passing, 429 yards

== Roster ==
1969 Purdue Boilermakers football team roster
Players
Coaches
Offense

Pos.	#	Name	Class
RB		Marv Adams
TE		Ashley Bell
RB		Stan Brown
RB		John Bullock
WR		Arnold Carter
RB		Scott Clayton
RB		Randy Cooper
TE		Mike Cota
OL		Paul DeNuccio
WR		Greg Fenner
OL		Donnie Green
OL		Tim Huxhold
QB		Don Kiepert
RB		Bob Kress
OL		Tom Luken
QB	15	Mike Phipps	Sr
WR		Mike Renie
OL		Walter Whitehead

Defense

Pos.	#	Name	Class
DT	81	Tom Bayless	Sr
DL		Dave Beigh
DB		Sammy Carter
DB		Steve deGrandmaison
DB	43	Tim Foley	Sr
DB		Richard Mahurt
DL		Ron Maree
DE	88	Bill McKoy	Sr
LB	99	Vero Parakevas	Jr
LB		Jim Teal
DE	97	Dennis Wirgowski	Sr
DL		Bill Yanchar

Special teams

Pos.	#	Name	Class

Head coach

- Jack Mollenkopf

Coordinators/assistant coaches

- Bob DeMoss
- Ned Maloney
- Tony Mason
- Ron Meyer

Legend

- (C) Team captain
- (S) Suspended
- (I) Ineligible
- Injured
- Redshirt

== Awards ==
All-Big Ten: HB Stan Brown (2nd), T Paul DeNuccio (1st), DB Tim Foley (2nd), DE Bill McKoy (2nd), LB Veno Paraskevas (1st), QB Mike Phipps (1st), C Walter Whitehead (2nd), T Bill Yancher (1st)

Chicago Tribune Big Ten MVP: QB Mike Phipps
