= 1969 Oregon Ducks football team =

American college football season

1969 Oregon Ducks football
- Conference: Pacific-8 Conference
- Record: 5–5–1 (2–3 Pac-8)
- Head coach: Jerry Frei (3rd season)
- Offensive coordinator: John Robinson
- Defensive coordinator: Norm Chapman
- Captains: Joe Philips; Dennis Gassner
- Home stadium: Autzen Stadium

1969 Pacific-8 Conference football standings
	Conf.					Overall
Team	W		L		T	W		L		T
No. 3 USC $	6	–	0	–	0	10	–	0	–	1
No. 13 UCLA	5	–	1	–	1	8	–	1	–	1
No. 19 Stanford	5	–	1	–	1	7	–	2	–	1
Oregon State	4	–	3	–	0	6	–	4	–	0
Oregon	2	–	3	–	0	5	–	5	–	1
California	2	–	4	–	0	5	–	5	–	0
Washington	1	–	6	–	0	1	–	9	–	0
Washington State	0	–	7	–	0	1	–	9	–	0
$ – Conference champion; Rankings from AP Poll

The 1969 Oregon Ducks football team represented the University of Oregon during the 1969 NCAA University Division football season. Home games were played on campus in Eugene at Autzen Stadium. Opened two years earlier in 1967 with natural grass, the field was switched to AstroTurf and lights were added prior to this season.

Under third-year head coach Jerry Frei, the Ducks were 5–5–1 overall and 2–3 in the Pacific-8 Conference; they did not play USC or California and the two league wins were over the Washington schools. After four road games in the first five, Oregon began a five-game home stand in late October with wins over Washington and Idaho and climbed to 4–3.

After a tie with Army, the Ducks met UCLA for the first time since 1958, the final season of the Pacific Coast Conference (PCC); it was the Bruins' first visit to Eugene since 1953. Seventh-ranked, UCLA's high-scoring offense had not fared well on artificial turf, and needed a late interception by the Bruin defense to remain undefeated and escape with a 13–10 win. The following week, Oregon State won their sixth consecutive Civil War game, the first on fake grass.

The season finale, a 57–16 win at overmatched Hawaii, put the Ducks back to .500 for eleven games. (Hawaii was in the college division (later Division II) until 1974.)

Sophomore wingback Bobby Moore (Ahmad Rashad) was named to the all-conference team. Quarterback Dan Fouts played on the frosh team; freshmen in the university division were ineligible for the varsity until the 1972 season.

== Schedule ==
Date	Time	Opponent	Site	Result	Attendance	Source
September 20		at Utah*	Ute Stadium; Salt Lake City, UT	W 28–17	17,000	
September 27	1:32 p.m.	at Stanford	Stanford Stadium; Stanford, CA	L 0–28	37,500	
October 4		at Washington State	Rogers Field; Pullman, WA	W 25–24	21,092	
October 11	1:30 p.m.	San Jose State*	Autzen Stadium; Eugene, OR	L 34–36	21,500	
October 18	12:30 p.m.	at Air Force*	Falcon Stadium; Colorado Springs, CO	L 13–60	36,820	
October 25		Washington	Autzen Stadium; Eugene, OR (rivalry)	W 22–7	34,200	
November 1		Idaho*	Autzen Stadium; Eugene, OR	W 58–14	20,500	
November 8	1:30 p.m.	Army*	Autzen Stadium; Eugene, OR	T 17–17	36,200	
November 15		No. 7 UCLA^{†}	Autzen Stadium; Eugene, OR	L 10–13	28,500	
November 22		Oregon State	Autzen Stadium; Eugene, OR (rivalry)	L 7–10	42,500	
November 29		at Hawaii*	Honolulu Stadium; Honolulu, HI	W 57–16	21,717	
*Non-conference game; ^{†}Homecoming; Rankings from AP Poll released prior to the game; All times are in Pacific time
