= Clyde Werner =

American football player (born 1947)

No. 54
- Position: Linebacker

Personal information
- Born: December 10, 1947; Munising, Michigan, U.S.
- Died: December 23, 2025 (aged 78)
- Listed height: 6 ft 4 in (1.93 m)
- Listed weight: 225 lb (102 kg)

Career information
- High school: Tacoma (WA) Wilson
- College: Washington
- NFL draft: 1970: 2nd round, 52nd overall pick

Career history
- Kansas City Chiefs (1970–1974, 1976)
- Stats at Pro Football Reference

Clyde Werner (December 10, 1947 – December 23, 2025) was an American professional football player who was a linebacker for six seasons with the Kansas City Chiefs of the National Football League (NFL). He played college football for the Washington Huskies in Seattle under head coach Jim Owens and was selected in the second round of the 1970 NFL draft with the 52nd overall pick.

== College ==
At Washington, Werner was a three-year letterman at linebacker from 1967 through 1969. Prior to his professional career, Werner played in the Chicago Tribune All-Star Game at Soldier Field on July 31 against the Chiefs.

== Death ==
Werner died on December 23, 2025 at the age of 78.
