= 1969 Wisconsin Badgers football team =

American college football season

1969 Wisconsin Badgers football
- Conference: Big Ten Conference
- Record: 3–7 (3–4 Big Ten)
- Head coach: John Coatta (3rd season)
- MVP: Stu Voigt
- Captains: Bill Gregory; Don Murphy; Mel Reddick
- Home stadium: Camp Randall Stadium

1969 Big Ten Conference football standings
	Conf.					Overall
Team	W		L		T	W		L		T
No. 4 Ohio State +	6	–	1	–	0	8	–	1	–	0
No. 9 Michigan +	6	–	1	–	0	8	–	3	–	0
No. 18 Purdue	5	–	2	–	0	8	–	2	–	0
Minnesota	4	–	3	–	0	4	–	5	–	1
Iowa	3	–	4	–	0	5	–	5	–	0
Indiana	3	–	4	–	0	4	–	6	–	0
Northwestern	3	–	4	–	0	3	–	7	–	0
Wisconsin	3	–	4	–	0	3	–	7	–	0
Michigan State	2	–	5	–	0	4	–	6	–	0
Illinois	0	–	7	–	0	0	–	10	–	0
+ – Conference co-champions; Rankings from AP Poll

The 1969 Wisconsin Badgers football team was an American football team that represented the University of Wisconsin as a member of the Big Ten Conference during the 1969 Big Ten season. In their third and final year under head coach John Coatta, the Badgers compiled a 3–7 record (3–4 in conference games), finished in a four-way tie for fifth place in the Big Ten, and were outscored by a total of 349 to 196.

The Badgers gained an average of 148.2 passing yards and 189.5 rushing yards per game. On defense, they gave up an average of 140.4 passing yards and 288.6 rushing yards per game. The team's individual statistical leaders included: quarterback Neil Graff (1,086 passing yards); running back Alan Thompson (907 rushing yards); and tight end Stu Voigt (39 receptions for 439 yards).

Bill Gregory, Don Murphy, and Mel Riddick were the team captains. Tight end Stu Voigt was selected as the team's most valuable player.

The Badgers played their home games at Camp Randall Stadium in Madison, Wisconsin.

== Schedule ==
Date	Opponent	Site	Result	Attendance	Source
September 20	No. 6 Oklahoma*	Camp Randall Stadium; Madison, WI	L 21–48	43,633	
September 27	No. 14 UCLA*	Camp Randall Stadium; Madison, WI	L 23–34	49,243	
October 4	Syracuse*	Camp Randall Stadium; Madison, WI	L 7–43	45,540	
October 11	Iowa	Camp Randall Stadium; Madison, WI (rivalry)	W 23–17	53,714	
October 18	at Northwestern	Dyche Stadium; Evanston, IL	L 7–27	34,374	
October 25	Indiana^{†}	Camp Randall Stadium; Madison, WI	W 36–34	58,636	
November 1	at No. 20 Michigan	Michigan Stadium; Ann Arbor, MI	L 7–35	60,438	
November 8	at No. 1 Ohio State	Ohio Stadium; Columbus, OH	L 7–62	86,519	
November 15	Illinois	Camp Randall Stadium; Madison, WI	W 55–14	42,624	
November 22	at Minnesota	Memorial Stadium; Minneapolis, MN (rivalry)	L 10–35	40,458	
*Non-conference game; ^{†}Homecoming; Rankings from AP Poll released prior to the game

== Roster ==
1969 Wisconsin Badgers football team roster
Players
Coaches
Offense

Pos.	#	Name	Class
RB	36	Joe Dawkins	Sr
QB	12	Neil Graff	So
TE	88	Larry Mialik	So
FB	37	Alan Thompson	So
TE	40	Stu Voigt	Sr

Defense

Pos.	#	Name	Class
DB	25	Dan Cooks	Jr
DT	73	Jim DeLisle	Jr
DT	76	Bill Gregory	Jr
DB	30	George McGarrett	Jr

Special teams

Pos.	#	Name	Class

Head coach

- John Coatta

Coordinators/assistant coaches

- Harland Carl
- Roger French
- Art Haege
- Stan Kemp
- Fred Marsh
- Kirk Mee
- Les Ritcherson
- LaVern Van Dyke

Legend

- (C) Team captain
- (S) Suspended
- (I) Ineligible
- Injured
- Redshirt

== 1970 NFL draft ==
Player	Position	Round	Pick	NFL club
Mike McClish	Tackle	8	196	Houston Oilers
Joe Dawkins	Running Back	10	248	Houston Oilers
Stu Voigt	Tight End	10	259	Minnesota Vikings
