= Mike Adamle =

American football player and sports broadcaster (born 1949)

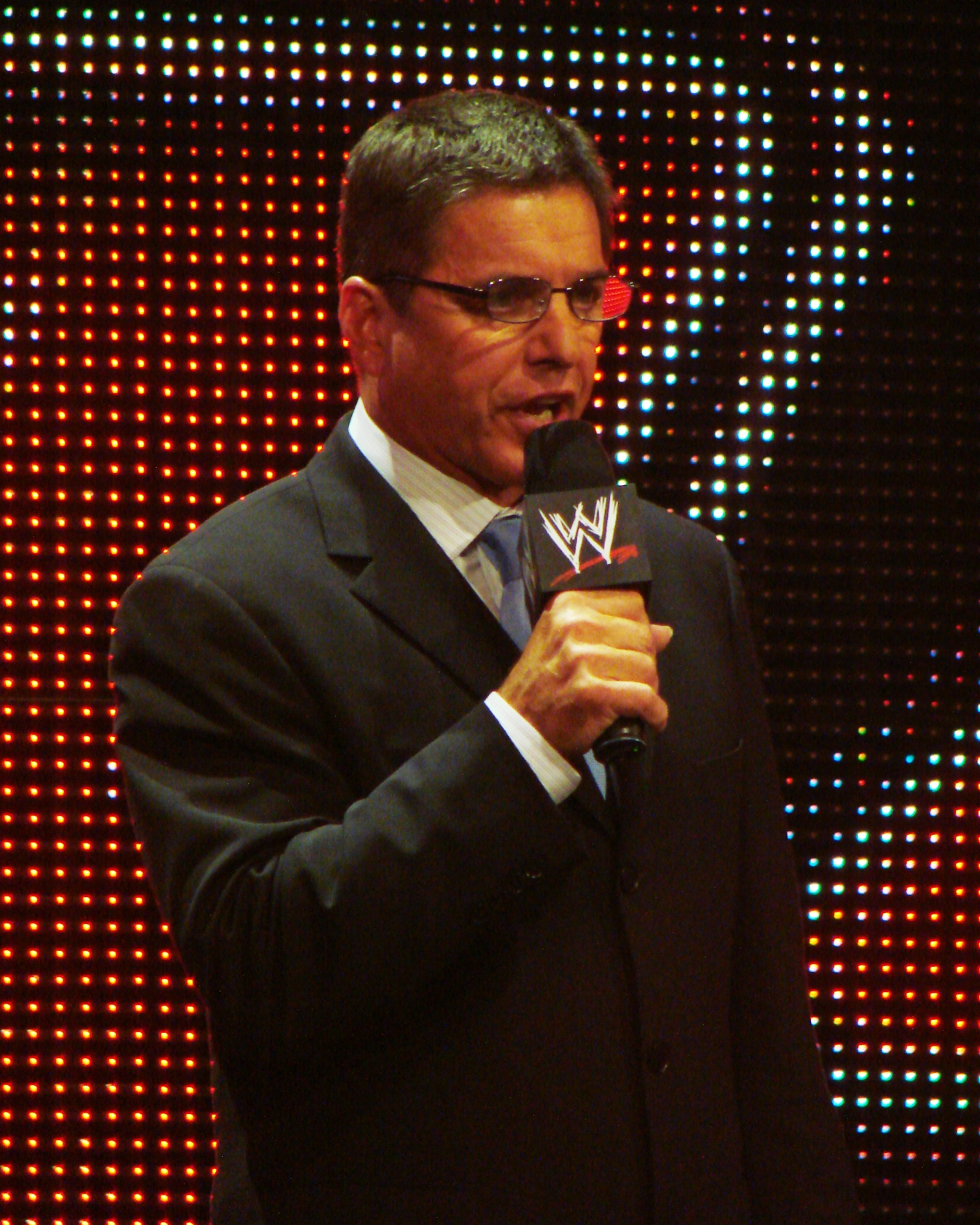
- Adamle in 2008 as the General Manager of WWE's Raw brand

No. 1, 20
- Positions: Running back, return specialist

Personal information
- Born: October 4, 1949 (age 77); Moline, Illinois, U.S.
- Listed height: 5 ft 9 in (1.75 m)
- Listed weight: 197 lb (89 kg)

Career information
- High school: Theodore Roosevelt (Kent, Ohio)
- College: Northwestern
- NFL draft: 1971: 5th round, 120th overall pick

Career history
- Kansas City Chiefs (1971–1972); New York Jets (1973–1974); Chicago Bears (1975–1976)

Awards and highlights
- Second-team All-American (1970); Chicago Tribune Silver Football (1970); 2× First-team All-Big Ten (1969, 1970)

Career NFL statistics
- Games played: 76
- Starts: 18
- Rushing attempts: 308
- Rushing yards: 1,149
- Touchdowns: 6
- Stats at Pro Football Reference

Michael David Adamle (born October 4, 1949) is an American former professional football player and sports broadcaster. He played professionally as a running back in the National Football League (NFL).

Adamle was a sports anchor at other Chicago television stations, including WLS-TV from 1982 to 1989 before hosting American Gladiators, a first stint at WMAQ-TV from 1998 to 2001, and then at WBBM-TV from 2001 to 2004 before returning to WMAQ-TV until 2017, when he was diagnosed with CTE-induced dementia which eventually forced his retirement.

For much of 2008, Adamle worked for World Wrestling Entertainment (WWE) in a variety of roles, including interviewer, play-by-play commentator, and General Manager of Raw.

== Early life ==
Born in Moline, Illinois, Adamle grew up in Kent, Ohio and graduated from Theodore Roosevelt High School in 1967. His father, Tony Adamle, also found some success as a linebacker with the Cleveland Browns in the late-1940s and early-1950s, before becoming a physician.

=== College football ===
Adamle played college football at Northwestern University in the Big Ten Conference. He was a team captain, an All-American fullback, and the Big Ten MVP in 1970. Adamle's 316 rushing yards against Wisconsin in 1969 set the school record (by 98 yards) which still stands. He also set the record for kick return yards in a year, and graduated in 1971.

== NFL career ==
Adamle played six years in the National Football League, two seasons each with three teams. He was a fifth round pick (120th overall) of the Kansas City Chiefs in the 1971 NFL draft. After two seasons with the Chiefs, Adamle was traded to the New York Jets on February 16, 1973, for defensive end Gerry Philbin.

He spent two years in New York with the Jets, playing in 26 of 28 games, during which he started 7 times.

Just before the start of the 1975 season, the Jets shipped Adamle to the Chicago Bears along with a 1976 4th round draft pick and defensive tackle Ron Rydalch in exchange for running back Carl Garrett. The Bears waived him prior to the 1977 season to make room on the roster for wide receiver John Gilliam, ending his professional football career.

== NFL career statistics ==
Legend
**Bold**	Career high

Year	Team	Games		Rushing					Receiving				
Year	Team	GP	GS	Att	Yds	Avg	Lng	TD	Rec	Yds	Avg	Lng	TD
1971	KAN	8	0	13	43	3.3	15	0	1	6	6.0	6	**1**
1972	KAN	**14**	4	73	303	**4.2**	19	1	**15**	76	5.1	11	0
1973	NYJ	**14**	4	67	264	3.9	**36**	0	9	63	7.0	13	0
1974	NYJ	12	3	28	93	3.3	21	**2**	9	84	**9.3**	16	0
1975	CHI	**14**	**7**	**94**	**353**	3.8	21	1	**15**	**111**	7.4	**25**	0
1976	CHI	**14**	0	33	93	2.8	12	0	4	28	7.0	12	**1**
		76	18	308	1,149	3.7	36	4	53	368	6.9	25	2

== Post NFL career ==
=== Football announcing ===
After retiring from playing football professionally, Adamle joined NBC Sports, where he was both a studio host and sideline reporter for various events. He spent six years with NBC Sports, hosting SportsWorld and pre-game shows. He was also the host of GrandStand, which was both a pregame show for the National Football League (NFL) and a sports anthology series during the NFL's off-season. In 1984, he was ABC's sideline reporter for the United States Football League (USFL). In 2001, Adamle returned to sideline reporting when he joined KNBC's Fred Roggin on NBC's primary XFL broadcast team.

=== American Gladiators ===
He was also the co-host of American Gladiators from 1989 to 1996. In addition, he was a contender in a celebrity contenders show towards the end of the show's run. Adamle also co-hosted International Gladiators with the UK and Australian Hosts and commentated in one series alongside UK commentator John Sachs. He appeared on the fourth-season premiere of Family Matters playing himself in a fictional episode of American Gladiators. After American Gladiators ended, he became a reporter for ESPN.

=== Other announcing ===
He has also covered the 1988 Winter Olympics and the 2000 and 2004 Summer Olympics. In the summer of 2005, Adamle was the host of another NBC property, Bravo's Battle of the Network Reality Stars. In July 2006, Adamle became a color commentator for the Professional Bull Riders (PBR)'s Built Ford Tough Series (another event which NBC has split rights).

=== World Wrestling Entertainment (2008) ===
On January 27, 2008, at the Royal Rumble, Adamle began working as an interviewer for World Wrestling Entertainment (WWE). Adamle then worked on WWE Raw as an interviewer, often making mistakes with each onscreen appearance. During Adamle's debut, he mistakenly referred to Jeff Hardy as "Jeff Harvey". Adamle later became ECW's play-by-play announcer on April 15, replacing Joey Styles. Adamle continued to make frequent mistakes during his commentary duties on ECW, with former ECW owner and booker Paul Heyman and former talent Lance Storm criticizing Adamle for them. On April 29, Adamle left a broadcast of ECW before the main event match, and his partner Tazz was asked to do the same. This was worked into a storyline as WWE reported that Adamle and Tazz may have left due to fan criticism of Adamle's commentary. The following week, he cut a promo apologizing for his actions.

On the July 28 episode of Raw, Executive Vice President Shane McMahon announced that Adamle was the new General Manager for the Raw brand. During Adamle's tenure as general manager, he promoted a variety of high-profile matches that he dubbed as "Adamle Originals." On the October 27 episode of Raw, as part of Adamle's storyline, he slapped Randy Orton after Orton insulted him personally. The following week on Raw, during an in-ring segment with Shane McMahon and Orton, Adamle resigned from his position as general manager. This was Adamle's last appearance for the company.

=== Arena Football League ===
Adamle was the play-by-play announcer for the Chicago Rush of the Arena Football League and broadcast Rush games for Comcast SportsNet Chicago and WGN. Following the 2013 AFL season, the Rush were unable to commit to the 2014 and 2015 AFL seasons and the team's operation were suspended immediately and the active roster was allocated amongst the rest of the AFL.

== Personal life ==
Adamle and his wife Kim have four children and four grandchildren.

Adamle has epilepsy. After work with Epilepsy Foundation, where he is currently a member of the Greater Chicago division's board of directors, Adamle was given his Personal Achievement Award at the 2007 Richard N. Rovner Awards Dinner. Adamle has completed two Ironman Triathlons in Kona, most recently as a 60-year-old in 2009, where he completed the race in 14 hours, 7 minutes and 39 seconds. He has also completed other Ironman races like Ironman USA (Lake Placid) 2003.

On February 7, 2017, Adamle said he was diagnosed with dementia, and that his doctor saw signs of chronic traumatic encephalopathy. He believes this and the past 19 years of epileptic seizures resulted from his concussions in football. He officially retired from WMAQ-TV on March 24, 2017, at a send-off party with colleagues.

== Championships and accomplishments ==
- **WrestleCrap**
  - Gooker Award (2008) - Mike Adamle's stint in WWE.
- **Wrestling Observer Newsletter awards**
  - Worst Television Announcer (2008)

== See also ==
- List of NCAA major college yearly punt and kickoff return leaders
