= 1969 Northwestern Wildcats football team =

American college football season

1969 Northwestern Wildcats football
- Conference: Big Ten Conference
- Record: 3–7 (3–4 Big Ten)
- Head coach: Alex Agase (6th season)
- MVP: Don Ross
- Captains: Ray Forsthoffer; Pat Harrington
- Home stadium: Dyche Stadium

1969 Big Ten Conference football standings
| | Conf. | | | | | Overall |
| Team | W | | L | | T | W | | L | | T |
|---|---|---|---|---|---|---|---|---|---|---|
| No. 4 Ohio State + | 6 | – | 1 | – | 0 | 8 | – | 1 | – | 0 |
| No. 9 Michigan + | 6 | – | 1 | – | 0 | 8 | – | 3 | – | 0 |
| No. 18 Purdue | 5 | – | 2 | – | 0 | 8 | – | 2 | – | 0 |
| Minnesota | 4 | – | 3 | – | 0 | 4 | – | 5 | – | 1 |
| Iowa | 3 | – | 4 | – | 0 | 5 | – | 5 | – | 0 |
| Indiana | 3 | – | 4 | – | 0 | 4 | – | 6 | – | 0 |
| Northwestern | 3 | – | 4 | – | 0 | 3 | – | 7 | – | 0 |
| Wisconsin | 3 | – | 4 | – | 0 | 3 | – | 7 | – | 0 |
| Michigan State | 2 | – | 5 | – | 0 | 4 | – | 6 | – | 0 |
| Illinois | 0 | – | 7 | – | 0 | 0 | – | 10 | – | 0 |
+ – Conference co-champions; Rankings from AP Poll

The 1969 Northwestern Wildcats football team represented Northwestern University during the 1969 Big Ten Conference football season. In their sixth year under head coach Alex Agase, the Wildcats compiled an overall record of 3–7 record with a mark of 3–4 against conference opponents, placing in the four-way tie for fifth in the Big Ten.

Junior running back Mike Adamle rushed for 316 yards against Wisconsin on October 18, breaking the previous school record by 98 yards (Charlie Hren vs. Navy in 1951).

== Schedule ==
| Date | Opponent | Site | Result | Attendance | Source |
|---|---|---|---|---|---|
| September 20 | at No. 11 Notre Dame* | Notre Dame Stadium; Notre Dame, IN (rivalry) | L 10–35 | 59,075 | |
| September 27 | at No. 5 USC* | Los Angeles Memorial Coliseum; Los Angeles, CA | L 6–48 | 56,589 | |
| October 4 | No. 11 UCLA* | Dyche Stadium; Evanston, IL | L 0–36 | 41,015 | |
| October 11 | at Illinois | Memorial Stadium; Champaign, IL (rivalry) | W 10–6 | 43,928 | |
| October 18 | Wisconsin | Dyche Stadium; Evanston, IL | W 27–7 | 34,374 | |
| October 25 | at No. 25 Purdue | Ross–Ade Stadium; West Lafayette, IN | L 20–45 | 66,103 | |
| November 1 | No. 1 Ohio State | Dyche Stadium; Evanston, IL | L 6–35 | 41,279 | |
| November 8 | at Minnesota | Memorial Stadium; Minneapolis, MN | L 21–28 | 41,576 | |
| November 15 | Indiana | Dyche Stadium; Evanston, IL | W 30–27 | 31,649 | |
| November 22 | Michigan State | Dyche Stadium; Evanston, IL | L 7–39 | 25,606 | |
*Non-conference game; Rankings from AP Poll released prior to the game

== Roster ==
1969 Northwestern Wildcats football team roster
Players
Coaches
Offense

| Pos. | # | Name | Class |
|---|---|---|---|
| RB | 34 | Mike Adamle | Jr |
| TE | 86 | Pat Harrington (C) | Sr |
| QB | 15 | Dave Shelbourne | Jr |
| G | 54 | Mike Sikich | Jr |

Defense

| Pos. | # | Name | Class |
|---|---|---|---|
| LB | 66 | Joel Hall | Jr |
| DB | 85 | Rick Telander | Jr |

Special teams

| Pos. | # | Name | Class |

Head coach

- Gary Barnett

Coordinators/assistant coaches

Legend

- (C) Team captain
- (S) Suspended
- (I) Ineligible
- Injured
- Redshirt
