= 1969 Washington State Cougars football team =

American college football season

1969 Washington State Cougars football
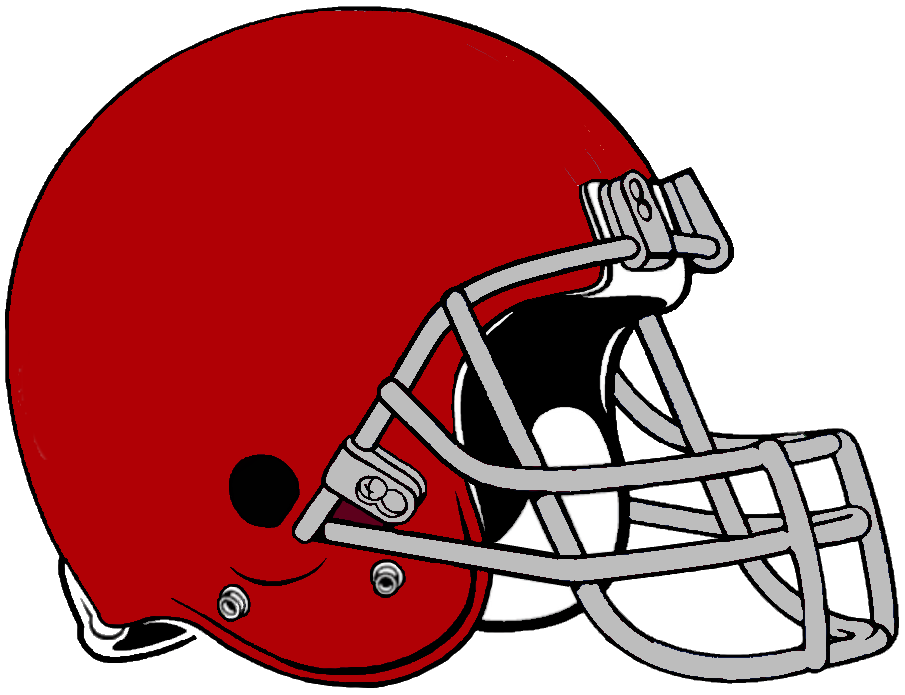
- Conference: Pacific-8 Conference
- Record: 1–9 (0–7 Pac-8)
- Head coach: Jim Sweeney (2nd season)
- Captains: Bob Ewen; Steve Shoun
- Home stadium: Rogers Field, Joe Albi Stadium

1969 Pacific-8 Conference football standings
	Conf.					Overall
Team	W		L		T	W		L		T
No. 3 USC $	6	–	0	–	0	10	–	0	–	1
No. 13 UCLA	5	–	1	–	1	8	–	1	–	1
No. 19 Stanford	5	–	1	–	1	7	–	2	–	1
Oregon State	4	–	3	–	0	6	–	4	–	0
Oregon	2	–	3	–	0	5	–	5	–	1
California	2	–	4	–	0	5	–	5	–	0
Washington	1	–	6	–	0	1	–	9	–	0
Washington State	0	–	7	–	0	1	–	9	–	0
$ – Conference champion; Rankings from AP Poll

The 1969 Washington State Cougars football team was an American football team that represented Washington State University in the Pacific-8 Conference (Pac-8) during the 1969 NCAA University Division football season. Under second-year head coach Jim Sweeney, the Cougars compiled a 1–9 record (0–7 in Pac-8, last), and were outscored 339 to 143. Two home games were played on campus in Pullman at Rogers Field, with two at Joe Albi Stadium in Spokane.

The team's statistical leaders included Jack Wigmore with 876 passing yards, Richard Lee Smith with 485 rushing yards, and Fred Moore with 523 receiving yards.

Washington State won their opener at Illinois by a point with a late field goal, then lost nine straight. They did not play Palouse neighbor Idaho in 1969; outside of World War II years without teams, it was the first break in the series since 1900. The game was dropped this season to allow the Cougars to schedule all seven Pacific-8 Conference opponents.

Both Washington State and Washington entered the Apple Cup in Seattle winless (0–6) in conference play; the Huskies won their only game of the season to avoid the Pac-8 cellar. It was the first game of the series played on artificial turf.

This was the last football season for Rogers Field, as its south grandstand (and press box) suffered a suspicious fire the following April, moving all home games in 1970 and 1971 to Joe Albi in Spokane. It was also the final year for natural grass on Cougar home fields (Rogers, Joe Albi). The game against Pacific on November 1 was the last on campus in Pullman for nearly three years, until the debut of Martin Stadium in September 1972.

== Schedule ==
Date	Time	Opponent	Site	Result	Attendance	Source
September 20		at Illinois*	Memorial Stadium; Champaign, IL	W 19–18	40,345	
September 27		at Iowa*	Iowa Stadium; Iowa City, IA	L 35–61	43,241	
October 4		Oregon	Rogers Field; Pullman, WA	L 24–25	21,092	
October 11		No. 11 UCLA	Joe Albi Stadium; Spokane, WA	L 14–46	22,100	
October 18		at No. 18 Stanford	Stanford Stadium; Stanford, CA	L 0–49	31,000	
October 25	1:30 p.m.	California	Joe Albi Stadium; Spokane, WA	L 0–17	16,700	
November 1	1:30 p.m.	Pacific (CA)*^{†}	Rogers Field; Pullman, WA	L 20–27	16,000	
November 8		at No. 6 USC	Los Angeles Memorial Coliseum; Los Angeles, CA	L 7–28	47,158	
November 15		at Oregon State	Parker Stadium; Corvallis, OR	L 3–38	23,679	
November 22		at Washington	Husky Stadium; Seattle, WA (Apple Cup)	L 21–30	54,500	
*Non-conference game; ^{†}Homecoming; Rankings from AP Poll released prior to the game; All times are in Pacific time

== Roster ==
1969 Washington State Cougars football team roster
Players
Coaches
Offense

Pos.	#	Name	Class
SE	42	Ed Armstrong	Jr
OT	73	Hank Bendix	Sr
OT	77	Buzz Brazeau	So
G	66	Steve Busch	So
SE	41	Johnny Davis	Sr
FB	33	Bob Ewen (C)	Jr
G	67	Jim Giesa	So
OT	76	Ty Hansell	Sr
QB	10	Chuck Hawthorne	So
G	62	Jim Hellyer	Sr
TE	86	Hugh Klopfenstein	Jr
C	53	Mike Lynch	Jr
FB	32	Ken Lyday	So
SE	88	Fred Moore	Sr
QB	11	Rich Olson	Sr
HB	21	Richard Lee Smith	Sr
QB	13	Jack Wigmore	Jr

Defense

Pos.	#	Name	Class
DT	71	Dave Berger	Sr
DT	75	Gary Branson	Sr
DE	82	Dave Crema	Sr
S	28	Eric Dahl	So
LB	58	Terry Durst	Jr
MG	55	Don Engler	Sr
CB	25	Gerry Herron	Jr
CB	27	Gary Kline	So
DT	57	Brian Lange	So
CB	40	Roger LeClerc	So
CB	20	Mike Monahan	So
LB	31	Jim Peterson	Sr
LB	65	Joe Richer	Jr
S	29	P.J. Shank	Sr
LB	63	Steve Shoun (C)	Sr
DE	91	Ernie Thomas	Sr
CB	22	Lionel Thomas	Jr

Special teams

Pos.	#	Name	Class
PK, P	20	Mike Monahan	So
PK	12	Paul Stensen	So

Head coach

- Jim Sweeney (2nd year)

Coordinators/assistant coaches

- Sam Jankovich (AHC, DL)
- Pinky Erickson (freshmen)
- Jim Erkenbeck (OL)
- Jim Shanley (DB)
- Don Lindsey (OB)
- Bob Simpson (WR)
- Walt Cubley (DL)

Legend

- (C) Team captain
- (S) Suspended
- (I) Ineligible
- Injured
- Redshirt

== All-conference ==
One Washington State defensive back, junior cornerback Lionel Thomas, was named to the All-Pac-8 team. On the second team (honorable mention) was senior defensive end Dave Crema. From Ohio, Thomas played junior college football at Wenatchee; he had six interceptions to co-lead the Pac-8, with a leading return yardage of 156 yards, highlighted by a 93-yard touchdown against UCLA.

== NFL draft ==
Three Cougars were selected in the 1970 NFL draft

Player	Position	Round	Overall	Franchise
Jim Vest	DE	15	374	New Orleans Saints
Fred Moore	WR	15	388	Oakland Raiders
Richard Smith	RB	17	422	Cincinnati Bengals

Vest was a former player (1967) who was with the Seattle Rangers of the Continental Football League.
