= 1969 Illinois Fighting Illini football team =

American college football season

1969 Illinois Fighting Illini football
- Conference: Big Ten Conference
- Record: 0–10 (0–7 Big Ten)
- Head coach: Jim Valek (3rd season)
- Offensive coordinator: Ellis Rainsberger (3rd season)
- MVP: Doug Dieken
- Captains: Doug Redmann; Bruce Erb
- Home stadium: Memorial Stadium

1969 Big Ten Conference football standings
	Conf.					Overall
Team	W		L		T	W		L		T
No. 4 Ohio State +	6	–	1	–	0	8	–	1	–	0
No. 9 Michigan +	6	–	1	–	0	8	–	3	–	0
No. 18 Purdue	5	–	2	–	0	8	–	2	–	0
Minnesota	4	–	3	–	0	4	–	5	–	1
Iowa	3	–	4	–	0	5	–	5	–	0
Indiana	3	–	4	–	0	4	–	6	–	0
Northwestern	3	–	4	–	0	3	–	7	–	0
Wisconsin	3	–	4	–	0	3	–	7	–	0
Michigan State	2	–	5	–	0	4	–	6	–	0
Illinois	0	–	7	–	0	0	–	10	–	0
+ – Conference co-champions; Rankings from AP Poll

The 1969 Illinois Fighting Illini football team was an American football team that represented the University of Illinois as a member of the Big Ten Conference during the 1969 Big Ten season. In their third year under head coach Jim Valek, the Fighting Illini compiled a 0–10 record (0–7 in conference games)< finished in last place in the Big Ten, and were outscored by a total of 397 to 106.

The team's statistical leaders included quarterback Steve Livas (705 passing yards, 32.1% completion percentage), running back Dave Jackson (465 rushing yards, 3.9 yards per carry), and tight end Doug Dieken (29 receptions for 486 yards). Dieken was selected as the team's most valuable player. Guard Doug Redmann was selected by the Newspaper Enterprise Association (NEA) as a second-team player on the 1969 All-America team.

The team played its home games at Memorial Stadium in Champaign, Illinois.

== Schedule ==
Date	Opponent	Site	Result	Attendance	Source
September 20	Washington State*	Memorial Stadium; Champaign, IL	L 18–19	40,345	
September 27	vs. No. 11 Missouri*	Busch Memorial Stadium; St. Louis, MO (rivalry)	L 6–37	48,740	
October 4	Iowa State*	Memorial Stadium; Champaign, IL	L 20–48	37,663	
October 11	Northwestern	Memorial Stadium; Champaign, IL (rivalry)	L 6–10	43,928	
October 18	at Indiana	Seventeenth Street Stadium; Bloomington, IN (rivalry)	L 20–41	51,812	
October 25	at No. 1 Ohio State	Ohio Stadium; Columbus, OH (Illibuck)	L 0–41	86,576	
November 1	No. 13 Purdue	Memorial Stadium; Champaign, IL (rivalry)	L 22–49	51,299	
November 8	No. 18 Michigan	Memorial Stadium; Champaign, IL (rivalry)	L 0–57	35,270	
November 15	at Wisconsin	Camp Randall Stadium; Madison, WI	L 14–55	42,624	
November 22	Iowa	Memorial Stadium; Champaign, IL	L 0–40	30,257	
*Non-conference game; Rankings from AP Poll released prior to the game

== Roster ==
1969 Illinois Fighting Illini football team roster
Players
Coaches
Offense

Pos.	#	Name	Class
E	82	Doug Dieken	Jr
G	60	Jack Morscheiser	So
C	54	Tony Ornatek	Jr
G		Joe Petrilli	So
WR	88	Mike Pickering	So

Defense

Pos.	#	Name	Class
DB	29	Steve Allen	Jr
MG	64	John Anderson	So
DB	47	Charlie Bareither	Sr
DB	34	Dan Bareither	So

Special teams

Pos.	#	Name	Class

Head coach

- Jim Valek

Coordinators/assistant coaches

Legend

- (C) Team captain
- (S) Suspended
- (I) Ineligible
- Injured
- Redshirt

Roster
