= 1969 USC Trojans football team =

American college football season

1969 USC Trojans football

Pac-8 champion Rose Bowl champion

Rose Bowl, W 10–3 vs. Michigan
- Conference: Pacific-8 Conference

Ranking
- Coaches: No. 4
- AP: No. 3
- Record: 10–0–1 (6–0 Pac-8)
- Head coach: John McKay (10th season)
- Captains: Jim Gunn; Bob Jensen
- Home stadium: Los Angeles Memorial Coliseum

1969 Pacific-8 Conference football standings
	Conf.					Overall
Team	W		L		T	W		L		T
No. 3 USC $	6	–	0	–	0	10	–	0	–	1
No. 13 UCLA	5	–	1	–	1	8	–	1	–	1
No. 19 Stanford	5	–	1	–	1	7	–	2	–	1
Oregon State	4	–	3	–	0	6	–	4	–	0
Oregon	2	–	3	–	0	5	–	5	–	1
California	2	–	4	–	0	5	–	5	–	0
Washington	1	–	6	–	0	1	–	9	–	0
Washington State	0	–	7	–	0	1	–	9	–	0
$ – Conference champion; Rankings from AP Poll

The 1969 USC Trojans football team represented the University of Southern California (USC) in the 1969 NCAA University Division football season. In their tenth year under head coach John McKay, the Trojans compiled a 10–0–1 record (6–0 against conference opponents), won the Pacific-8 Conference (Pac-8) championship, defeated Michigan in the Rose Bowl, and outscored their opponents 261 to 128. The team was ranked third in the final AP Poll and fourth in the final Coaches Poll.

Jim Jones led the team in passing, completing 88 of 210 passes for 1,230 yards with 13 touchdowns and 10 interceptions. Clarence Davis led the team in rushing with 297 carries for 1,357 yards and nine touchdowns. Sam Dickerson led the team in receiving with 24 catches for 473 yards and six touchdowns.

== Schedule ==
Date	Time	Opponent	Rank	Site	Result	Attendance	Source
September 20		at Nebraska*	No. 5	Memorial Stadium; Lincoln, NE	W 31–21	67,058	
September 27		Northwestern*	No. 5	Los Angeles Memorial Coliseum; Los Angeles, CA	W 48–6	56,589	
October 4		at Oregon State	No. 5	Parker Stadium; Corvallis, OR	W 31–7	38,013	
October 11	8:00 p.m.	No. 16 Stanford	No. 4	Los Angeles Memorial Coliseum; Los Angeles, CA (rivalry)	W 26–24	82,812	
October 18		at No. 11 Notre Dame*	No. 3	Notre Dame Stadium; Notre Dame, IN (rivalry)	T 14–14	59,075	
October 25		Georgia Tech*^{†}	No. 7	Los Angeles Memorial Coliseum; Los Angeles, CA	W 29–18	53,341	
November 1	1:30 p.m.	at California	No. 6	California Memorial Stadium; Berkeley, CA	W 14–9	51,000	
November 8		Washington State	No. 6	Los Angeles Memorial Coliseum; Los Angeles, CA	W 28–7	47,158	
November 15		at Washington	No. 6	Husky Stadium; Seattle, WA	W 16–7	49,000	
November 22		No. 6 UCLA	No. 5	Los Angeles Memorial Coliseum; Los Angeles, CA (Victory Bell)	W 14–12	90,814	
January 1, 1970		vs. No. 7 Michigan*	No. 5	Rose Bowl; Pasadena, CA (Rose Bowl)	W 10–3	103,878	
*Non-conference game; ^{†}Homecoming; Rankings from AP Poll released prior to the game

== Game summaries ==
=== UCLA ===
UCLA at USC

Team	1	2	3	4	Total
No. 6 Bruins	6	0	0	6	12
• No. 5 Trojans	0	7	0	7	14

- Date: November 22
- Location: Los Angeles Memorial Coliseum, Los Angeles
- Game attendance: 90,814
- TV announcers (ABC): Chris Schenkel, Bud Wilkinson

Scoring summary
1		UCLA	Farmer 41-yard pass from Jones (pass failed)	UCLA 6-0
2		USC	Davis 13-yard run (Ayala kick)	USC 7-6
4	3:07	UCLA	Cooper 7-yard pass from Dummit (pass failed)	UCLA 12-7
4	1:32	USC	Dickerson 32-yard pass from Jones (Ayala kick)	USC 14-12

== Roster ==
1969 USC Trojans football team roster
Players
Coaches
Offense

Pos.	#	Name	Class
WR	9	Bob Chandler	Jr
QB	7	Mike Holmgren	Sr
QB	8	Jimmy Jones	So
OT	78	Marv Montgomery	Jr
OT	77	Sid Smith	Sr
OT	75	John Vella	So
TE	89	Charle Young	So

Defense

Pos.	#	Name	Class
DT	72	Al Cowlings	Sr
CB	16	Sandy Durko	Sr
DE	83	Jimmy Gunn	Sr
DT	93	Tody Smith	Jr
DB	46	Skip Thomas	So
LB	84	Charlie Weaver	Jr

Special teams

Pos.	#	Name	Class

Head coach

- John McKay

Coordinators/assistant coaches

Legend

- (C) Team captain
- (S) Suspended
- (I) Ineligible
- Injured
- Redshirt
