= 1969 Oregon State Beavers football team =

American college football season

1969 Oregon State Beavers football
- Conference: Pacific-8 Conference
- Record: 6–4 (4–3 Pac-8)
- Head coach: Dee Andros (5th season)
- Home stadium: Parker Stadium; Civic Stadium

1969 Pacific-8 Conference football standings
	Conf.					Overall
Team	W		L		T	W		L		T
No. 3 USC $	6	–	0	–	0	10	–	0	–	1
No. 13 UCLA	5	–	1	–	1	8	–	1	–	1
No. 19 Stanford	5	–	1	–	1	7	–	2	–	1
Oregon State	4	–	3	–	0	6	–	4	–	0
Oregon	2	–	3	–	0	5	–	5	–	1
California	2	–	4	–	0	5	–	5	–	0
Washington	1	–	6	–	0	1	–	9	–	0
Washington State	0	–	7	–	0	1	–	9	–	0
$ – Conference champion; Rankings from AP Poll

The 1969 Oregon State Beavers football team represented Oregon State University during the 1969 NCAA University Division football season. Home games were played on campus in Corvallis at Parker Stadium, with one at Civic Stadium in Portland. Both installed artificial turf prior to the season.

Under fifth-year head coach Dee Andros, the Beavers were 6–4 overall and 4–3 in the Pacific-8 Conference (Pac-8). In the Civil War game against Oregon in Eugene, the first on artificial turf, OSU won for the sixth consecutive year.

== Schedule ==
Date	Time	Opponent	Site	Result	Attendance	Source
September 13		at No. 17 UCLA	Los Angeles Memorial Coliseum; Los Angeles, CA	L 0–37	50,091	
September 20		at Iowa*	Iowa Stadium; Iowa City, IA	W 42–14	51,800	
September 27		at No. 18 Arizona State*	Sun Devil Stadium; Tempe, AZ	W 30–7	50,025	
October 4		No. 5 USC	Parker Stadium; Corvallis, OR	L 7–31	38,013	
October 18		at Washington	Husky Stadium; Seattle, WA	W 10–6	52,500	
October 25		Utah*	Civic Stadium; Portland, OR	L 3–7	27,910	
November 1	1:30 p.m.	No. 15 Stanford	Parker Stadium; Corvallis, OR	L 0–33	27,790	
November 8	1:30 p.m.	at California	California Memorial Stadium; Berkeley, CA	W 35–3	22,000	
November 15		Washington State^{†}	Parker Stadium; Corvallis, OR	W 38–3	23,679	
November 22		at Oregon	Autzen Stadium; Eugene, OR (Civil War)	W 10–7	42,500	
*Non-conference game; ^{†}Homecoming; Rankings from AP Poll released prior to the game; All times are in Pacific time

== Roster ==
1969 Oregon State Beavers football team roster
Players
Coaches
Offense

Pos.	#	Name	Class
QB	17	Gary Barton	Jr
QB	19	Steve Endicott	So
G	73	Chris Haag	So
WR	81	Jeff Kolberg
RB	22	Billy Main	Sr
OT	75	Steve Morton	So
OT	71	Dave Nirenberg	So
TE	88	Bill Plumeau	Sr
WR	80	Jim Scheele	Sr
FB	42	Dave Schilling	So
C	51	Mike White	Sr
G	64	Dan Zellick	So

Defense

Pos.	#	Name	Class
DB	38	Mel Easley	Sr
DT	63	Craig Hanneman	Jr
LB	44	Wally Johnson	Sr
DE	85	Rich LaSalle	Sr
DT	66	Jess Lewis	Sr
DT	78	Bill Nelson	Sr
DB	26	Larry Rich	Sr
DE	90	Jim Sherbert	So
DB	39	Don Whitney	Sr

Special teams

Pos.	#	Name	Class
K	30	Mike Nehl	Jr

Head coach

- Dee Andros

Coordinators/assistant coaches

Legend

- (C) Team captain
- (S) Suspended
- (I) Ineligible
- Injured
- Redshirt
