= 1969 California Golden Bears football team =

American college football season

1969 California Golden Bears football
- Conference: Pacific-8 Conference
- Record: 5–5 (2–4 Pac-8)
- Head coach: Ray Willsey (6th season)
- Home stadium: California Memorial Stadium

1969 Pacific-8 Conference football standings
	Conf.					Overall
Team	W		L		T	W		L		T
No. 3 USC $	6	–	0	–	0	10	–	0	–	1
No. 13 UCLA	5	–	1	–	1	8	–	1	–	1
No. 19 Stanford	5	–	1	–	1	7	–	2	–	1
Oregon State	4	–	3	–	0	6	–	4	–	0
Oregon	2	–	3	–	0	5	–	5	–	1
California	2	–	4	–	0	5	–	5	–	0
Washington	1	–	6	–	0	1	–	9	–	0
Washington State	0	–	7	–	0	1	–	9	–	0
$ – Conference champion; Rankings from AP Poll

The 1969 California Golden Bears football team was an American football team that represented the University of California, Berkeley in the Pacific-8 Conference (Pac-8) during the 1969 NCAA University Division football season. In their sixth year under head coach Ray Willsey, the Golden Bears compiled a 5–5 record (2–4 in Pac-8, sixth) and were outscored 182 to 180. Home games were played on campus at California Memorial Stadium in Berkeley, California.

California's statistical leaders on offense were quarterback Dave Penhall with 874 passing yards, Gary Fowler with 741 rushing yards, and Jim Fraser with 335 receiving yards.

== Schedule ==
Date	Time	Opponent	Site	Result	Attendance	Source
September 20		No. 4 Texas*	California Memorial Stadium; Berkeley, CA	L 0–17	31,000	
September 27	10:30 a.m.	at No. 10 Indiana*	Memorial Stadium; Bloomington, IN	W 17–14	52,904	
October 4	1:31 p.m.	Rice*	California Memorial Stadium; Berkeley, CA	W 31–21	36,391	
October 11	1:32 p.m.	Washington	California Memorial Stadium; Berkeley, CA	W 44–13	34,000	
October 18	1:28 p.m.	at No. 8 UCLA	Los Angeles Memorial Coliseum; Los Angeles, CA (rivalry)	L 0–32	38,998	
October 25	1:30 p.m.	at Washington State	Joe Albi Stadium; Spokane, WA	W 17–0	16,700	
November 1	1:30 p.m.	No. 6 USC	California Memorial Stadium; Berkeley, CA	L 9–14	51,000	
November 8	1:30 p.m.	Oregon State	California Memorial Stadium; Berkeley, CA	L 3–35	22,000	
November 15	1:31 p.m.	San Jose State*	California Memorial Stadium; Berkeley, CA	W 31–7	18,000	
November 22	1:30 p.m.	at No. 14 Stanford	Stanford Stadium; Stanford, CA (Big Game)	L 28–29	80,000	
*Non-conference game; Rankings from AP Poll released prior to the game; All times are in Pacific time
