= 1969 Washington Huskies football team =

American college football season

1969 Washington Huskies football
- Conference: Pacific-8 Conference
- Record: 1–9 (1–6 Pac-8)
- Head coach: Jim Owens (13th season)
- Captains: Ken Ballenger; Lee Brock
- Home stadium: University of Washington Stadium

1969 Pacific-8 Conference football standings
	Conf.					Overall
Team	W		L		T	W		L		T
No. 3 USC $	6	–	0	–	0	10	–	0	–	1
No. 13 UCLA	5	–	1	–	1	8	–	1	–	1
No. 19 Stanford	5	–	1	–	1	7	–	2	–	1
Oregon State	4	–	3	–	0	6	–	4	–	0
Oregon	2	–	3	–	0	5	–	5	–	1
California	2	–	4	–	0	5	–	5	–	0
Washington	1	–	6	–	0	1	–	9	–	0
Washington State	0	–	7	–	0	1	–	9	–	0
$ – Conference champion; Rankings from AP Poll

The 1969 Washington Huskies football team was an American football team that represented the University of Washington during the 1969 NCAA University Division football season. In its thirteenth season under head coach Jim Owens, the team compiled a 1–9 record (1–6 in the Pacific-8 Conference, seventh), and was outscored 304 to 116.

Winless entering the Apple Cup, the Huskies defeated Washington State in Seattle to avoid the conference cellar.

Senior guard Ken Ballenger and defensive tackle Lee Brock were the team captains.

== Schedule ==
Date	Time	Opponent	Site	Result	Attendance	Source
September 20		at No. 12 Michigan State*	Spartan Stadium; East Lansing, MI	L 11–27	63,022	
September 27		at No. 20 Michigan*	Michigan Stadium; Ann Arbor, MI	L 7–45	49,684	
October 4		No. 1 Ohio State*	University of Washington Stadium; Seattle, WA	L 14–41	58,000	
October 11	1:32 p.m.	at California	California Memorial Stadium; Berkeley, CA	L 13–44	34,000	
October 18		Oregon State	University of Washington Stadium; Seattle, WA	L 6–10	52,500	
October 25		at Oregon	Autzen Stadium; Eugene, OR (rivalry)	L 7–22	34,200	
November 1		at No. 9 UCLA	Los Angeles Memorial Coliseum; Los Angeles, CA	L 14–57	34,899	
November 8		No. 14 Stanford	University of Washington Stadium; Seattle, WA	L 7–21	48,000	
November 15		No. 6 USC	University of Washington Stadium; Seattle, WA	L 7–16	49,000	
November 22		Washington State	University of Washington Stadium; Seattle, WA (Apple Cup)	W 30–21	54,500	
*Non-conference game; Rankings from AP Poll released prior to the game; All times are in Pacific time

== Game summaries ==
=== Washington State ===
Both teams entered the Apple Cup winless in the Pac-8.

Team	1	2	3	4	Total
Washington State	7	0	6	8	21
• Washington	7	21	0	2	30

- Date:
  November 22
- Location: University of Washington Stadium, Seattle
- Game attendance: 55,677
- Game weather: 44 °F (7 °C), overcast

Scoring summary
1	WASH	Preston 35-yard run (Volbrecht kick)	WASH 7-0
1	WSU	Moore 78-yard pass from Olson (Stanson kick)	Tied 7-7
2	WASH	Bayard 11-yard pass from Willis (Volbrecht kick)	WASH 14-7
2	WASH	Bell 12-yard run (Volbrecht kick)	WASH 21-7
2	WASH	Bayard 62-yard pass from Willis (Volbrecht kick)	WASH 28-7
3	WSU	Olson 1-yard run (kick failed)	WASH 28-13
4	WASH	Safety, Olson tackled in end zone	WASH 30-13
4	WSU	Smith 1-yard run (Smith run)	WASH 30-21

== Roster ==
1969 Washington Huskies football team roster
Players
Coaches
Offense

Pos.	#	Name	Class
QB	14	Gene Willis	Jr
QB	15	Steve Hanzlik	So
HB	25	Buddy Kennamer	Sr
HB	28	Joe Bell	Jr
RB	32	Bo Cornell	Jr
HB	47	Ron Preston	Jr
C	53	Bruce Jarvis	Jr
G	61	Ken Ballenger (C)	Sr
OT	64	Augie Rios	Sr
G	65	Wayne Sortun	Jr
OT	72	Dan Cunningham	Jr
G	77	Ernie Janet	Jr
SE	83	Jim Krieg	So
TE	85	Ace Bulger	Jr
SE	89	Al Maurer	Jr
SE	92	Ralph Bayard	Jr

Defense

Pos.	#	Name	Class
S	10	Ron Volbrecht	Jr
CB	12	Mark McMahon	Jr
S	18	Bob Berg	Sr
LB	35	Tom Verti	Sr
LB	36	Clyde Werner	Sr
S	45	Mark Day	Jr
CB	47	Gary Carr	Jr
LB	48	Rick Huget	So
DE	70	Rick Sharp	Sr
DE	84	Ken Lee	Jr
DT	87	Lee Brock (C)	Sr
LB	88	Bob Lovelien	Jr
DT	91	Tom Failla	Jr
DE	97	Mark Hannah	Sr

Special teams

Pos.	#	Name	Class
PK	10	Ron Volbrecht	Jr
P	14	Gene Willis	Jr

Head coach

- Jim Owens (13th year)

Coordinators/assistant coaches

Legend

- (C) Team captain
- (S) Suspended
- (I) Ineligible
- Injured
- Redshirt

== NFL draft selections ==
Two University of Washington Huskies were selected in the 1970 NFL draft, which lasted 17 rounds with 442 selections.

= Husky Hall of Fame

Player	Position	Round	Overall	Franchise
Clyde Werner	Linebacker	2nd	52	Kansas City Chiefs
Rick Sharp	Defensive tackle	12th	288	Pittsburgh Steelers
