= 1969 Stanford Indians football team =

American college football season

1969 Stanford Indians football
- Conference: Pacific-8 Conference

Ranking
- Coaches: No. 14
- AP: No. 19
- Record: 7–2–1 (5–1–1 Pac-8)
- Head coach: John Ralston (7th season)
- Home stadium: Stanford Stadium

1969 Pacific-8 Conference football standings
	Conf.					Overall
Team	W		L		T	W		L		T
No. 3 USC $	6	–	0	–	0	10	–	0	–	1
No. 13 UCLA	5	–	1	–	1	8	–	1	–	1
No. 19 Stanford	5	–	1	–	1	7	–	2	–	1
Oregon State	4	–	3	–	0	6	–	4	–	0
Oregon	2	–	3	–	0	5	–	5	–	1
California	2	–	4	–	0	5	–	5	–	0
Washington	1	–	6	–	0	1	–	9	–	0
Washington State	0	–	7	–	0	1	–	9	–	0
$ – Conference champion; Rankings from AP Poll

The 1969 Stanford Indians football team represented Stanford University during the 1969 NCAA University Division football season. The Indians were coached by John Ralston in his seventh season, matching Tiny Thornhill for the second-longest tenure of any Stanford coach to date. Stanford was led by future Heisman Trophy winner Jim Plunkett in his second season as starting quarterback.

== Schedule ==
Date	Time	Opponent	Rank	Site	Result	Attendance	Source
September 20	1:30 p.m.	San Jose State*	No. 16	Stanford Stadium; Stanford, CA (rivalry)	W 63–21	31,000	
September 27	1:32 p.m.	Oregon		Stanford Stadium; Stanford, CA	W 28–0	37,500	
October 4	10:30 a.m.	at No. 8 Purdue*	No. 17	Ross–Ade Stadium; West Lafayette, IN	L 35–36	65,472	
October 11	8:00 p.m.	at No. 4 USC	No. 16	Los Angeles Memorial Coliseum; Los Angeles, CA (rivalry)	L 24–26	82,812	
October 18		Washington State	No. 18	Stanford Stadium; Stanford, CA	W 49–0	31,000	
October 25	1:30 p.m.	No. 6 UCLA	No. 19	Stanford Stadium; Stanford, CA	T 20–20	84,000	
November 1	1:30 p.m.	at Oregon State	No. 16	Parker Stadium; Corvallis, OR	W 33–0	27,798	
November 8		at Washington	No. 14	Husky Stadium; Seattle, WA	W 21–7	48,000	
November 15		No. 20 Air Force*	No. 13	Stanford Stadium; Stanford, CA	W 47–34	41,500	
November 22	1:30 p.m.	California	No. 14	Stanford Stadium; Stanford, CA (Big Game)	W 29–28	80,000	
*Non-conference game; Rankings from AP Poll released prior to the game

== Players drafted by the NFL ==
Player	Position	Round	Pick	NFL club
Don Parish	Linebacker	4	91	St. Louis Cardinals
Bob Reinhard	Guard	9	224	Green Bay Packers
Isaiah Brown	Defensive back	10	236	Pittsburgh Steelers
Dave Sharp	Defensive end	15	378	Houston Oilers
