= 1969 Iowa Hawkeyes football team =

American college football season

1969 Iowa Hawkeyes football
- Conference: Big Ten Conference
- Record: 5–5 (3–4 Big Ten)
- Head coach: Ray Nagel (4th season)
- MVP: Larry Ely
- Captains: Jon Meskimen; Larry Ely
- Home stadium: Iowa Stadium

1969 Big Ten Conference football standings
	Conf.					Overall
Team	W		L		T	W		L		T
No. 4 Ohio State +	6	–	1	–	0	8	–	1	–	0
No. 9 Michigan +	6	–	1	–	0	8	–	3	–	0
No. 18 Purdue	5	–	2	–	0	8	–	2	–	0
Minnesota	4	–	3	–	0	4	–	5	–	1
Iowa	3	–	4	–	0	5	–	5	–	0
Indiana	3	–	4	–	0	4	–	6	–	0
Northwestern	3	–	4	–	0	3	–	7	–	0
Wisconsin	3	–	4	–	0	3	–	7	–	0
Michigan State	2	–	5	–	0	4	–	6	–	0
Illinois	0	–	7	–	0	0	–	10	–	0
+ – Conference co-champions; Rankings from AP Poll

The 1969 Iowa Hawkeyes football team was an American football team that represented the University of Iowa as a member of the Big Ten Conference during the 1969 Big Ten football season. In their fourth year under head coach Ray Nagel, the Hawkeyes compiled a 5–5 record (3–4 in conference game), finished in a four-way tie for fifth place in the Big Ten, and were outscored by a total of 275 to 255.

The 1969 Hawkeyes gained 2,155 rushing yards and 2,088 passing yards. On defense, they gave up 2,205 rushing yards and 1,614 passing yards.

The team's statistical leaders included quarterback Larry Lawrence (113-of-239 passing, 1,680 yards), Steve Penney (484 rushing yards), Kerry Reardon (43 receptions for 738 yards), and Alan Schuette (45 points scored). Guard Jon Meskimen was a first-team All-Big Ten player. Meskimen and linebacker Larry Ely were the team captains. Ely was selected as the team's most valuable player.

The team played its home games at Iowa Stadium in Iowa City, Iowa. Home attendance totaled 301,287, an average of 50,218 per game.

== Schedule ==
Date	Opponent	Site	TV	Result	Attendance	Source
September 20	Oregon State*	Iowa Stadium; Iowa City, IA		L 14–42	51,800	
September 27	Washington State*	Iowa Stadium; Iowa City, IA		W 61–35	43,241	
October 4	Arizona*	Iowa Stadium; Iowa City, IA		W 31–19	47,391	
October 11	at Wisconsin	Camp Randall Stadium; Madison, WI (rivalry)		L 17–23	53,714	
October 18	at No. 17 Purdue	Ross–Ade Stadium; West Lafayette, IN		L 31–35	65,971	
October 25	Michigan State^{†}	Iowa Stadium; Iowa City, IA	ABC	W 19–18	56,471	
November 1	Minnesota	Iowa Stadium; Iowa City, IA (rivalry)		L 8–35	56,413	
November 8	at Indiana	Seventeenth Street Stadium; Bloomington, IN	ABC	W 28–17	52,854	
November 15	No. 14 Michigan	Iowa Stadium; Iowa City, IA		L 6–51	45,981	
November 22	at Illinois	Memorial Stadium; Champaign, IL		W 40–0	30,257	
*Non-conference game; ^{†}Homecoming; Rankings from AP Poll released prior to the game

== Roster ==
1969 Iowa Hawkeyes football team roster
Players
Coaches
Offense

Pos.	#	Name	Class
QB	10	Larry Lawrence	Sr
RB	44	Dennis Green	Jr
WR	22	Kerry Reardon	Jr

Defense

Pos.	#	Name	Class
DB	43	Craig Clemons	So
LB		Larry Ely	Sr

Special teams

Pos.	#	Name	Class

Head coach

- Ray Nagel

Coordinators/assistant coaches

Legend

- (C) Team captain
- (S) Suspended
- (I) Ineligible
- Injured
- Redshirt
