= 1969 UCLA Bruins football team =

American college football season

1969 UCLA Bruins football
- Conference: Pacific-8 Conference

Ranking
- Coaches: No. 10
- AP: No. 13
- Record: 8–1–1 (5–1–1 Pac-8)
- Head coach: Tommy Prothro (5th season)
- Home stadium: Los Angeles Memorial Coliseum

1969 Pacific-8 Conference football standings
	Conf.					Overall
Team	W		L		T	W		L		T
No. 3 USC $	6	–	0	–	0	10	–	0	–	1
No. 13 UCLA	5	–	1	–	1	8	–	1	–	1
No. 19 Stanford	5	–	1	–	1	7	–	2	–	1
Oregon State	4	–	3	–	0	6	–	4	–	0
Oregon	2	–	3	–	0	5	–	5	–	1
California	2	–	4	–	0	5	–	5	–	0
Washington	1	–	6	–	0	1	–	9	–	0
Washington State	0	–	7	–	0	1	–	9	–	0
$ – Conference champion; Rankings from AP Poll

The 1969 UCLA Bruins football team represented the University of California, Los Angeles (UCLA) as a member of the Pacific-8 Conference during the 1969 NCAA University Division football season. Led by fifth-year head coach Tommy Prothro, the Bruins compiled an overall record of 8–1–1 with a mark of 5–1–1 in conference play, tying for second place in the Pac-8. UCLA played home game at Los Angeles Memorial Coliseum in Los Angeles.

== Schedule ==
Date	Time	Opponent	Rank	Site	Result	Attendance	Source
September 13		Oregon State	No. 17	Los Angeles Memorial Coliseum; Los Angeles, CA	W 37–0	50,091	
September 20		Pittsburgh*	No. 17	Los Angeles Memorial Coliseum; Los Angeles, CA	W 42–8	35,258	
September 27		at Wisconsin*	No. 14	Camp Randall Stadium; Madison, WI	W 34–23	49,243	
October 4		at Northwestern*	No. 11	Dyche Stadium; Evanston, IL	W 36–0	41,015	
October 11		at Washington State	No. 11	Joe Albi Stadium; Spokane, WA	W 46–14	22,100	
October 18	1:28 p.m.	California	No. 8	Los Angeles Memorial Coliseum; Los Angeles, CA (rivalry)	W 32–0	38,998	
October 25	1:30 p.m.	at No. 19 Stanford	No. 6	Stanford Stadium; Stanford, CA	T 20–20	84,000	
November 1		Washington	No. 9	Los Angeles Memorial Coliseum; Los Angeles, CA	W 57–14	34,899	
November 15		at Oregon	No. 7	Autzen Stadium; Eugene, OR	W 13–10	28,500	
November 22		at No. 5 USC	No. 6	Los Angeles Memorial Coliseum; Los Angeles, CA (Victory Bell)	L 12–14	90,814	
*Non-conference game; Rankings from AP Poll released prior to the game

== Game summaries ==
=== USC ===
Team	1	2	3	4	Total
UCLA	6	0	0	6	12
• USC	0	7	0	7	14

- Date: November 22
- Location: Los Angeles Memorial Coliseum, Los Angeles, CA
- Game attendance: 90,814
- TV announcers: Chris Schenkel, Bud Wilkinson

Scoring summary
1		UCLA	Farmer 41-yard pass from Jones (pass failed)	UCLA 6-0
2		USC	Davis 13-yard run (Ayala kick)	USC 7-6
4	3:07	UCLA	Cooper 7-yard pass from Dummit (pass failed)	UCLA 12-7
4	1:32	USC	Dickerson 32-yard pass from Jones (Ayala kick)	USC 14-12

== Roster ==
Offense

- 83 Gwen Cooper LE
- 79 Gordon Bosserman LT
- 68 Ron Tretter LG
- 50 Dave Dalby C
- 67 Dennis Alumbaugh RG
- 70 Lee McElroy RT
- 87 Mike Garratt RE
- 19 Dennis Dummit QB
- 43 Greg Jones LH
- 46 George Farmer RH
- 30 Mickey Cureton FB

Defense

- 93 Bob Geddes LE
- 60 Bruce Jorgensen LT
- 74 Floyd Reese RT
- 89 Wesley Grant RE
- 55 Don Widmer LLB
- 44 K. Monty Harrison MLB
- 57 Mike Ballou MLB
- 92 Jim Ford RLB
- 28 Doug Huff LC
- 20 Danny Graham RC
- 23 Ron Carver LS
- 27 Dennis Spurling RS

Coaches

- Tommy Prothro (Head)
- Earnel Durden
- Larry Weaver
- Tony Kopay
- John Jardine
- Jerry Long
- Lew Stueck
- Norman Dow
- Jim Camp
- Bobb McKittrick
