= Stu Voigt =

American football player (born 1948)

No. 83
- Position: Tight end

Personal information
- Born: August 12, 1948 (age 78); Madison, Wisconsin, U.S.
- Listed height: 6 ft 2 in (1.88 m)
- Listed weight: 223 lb (101 kg)

Career information
- High school: West (Madison)
- College: Wisconsin (1966–1969)
- NFL draft: 1970: 10th round, 259th overall pick

Career history
- Minnesota Vikings (1970–1980)

Awards and highlights
- 50 Greatest Vikings; Minnesota Vikings 25th Anniversary Team

Career NFL statistics
- Receptions: 177
- Receiving yards: 1,919
- Receiving touchdowns: 17
- Stats at Pro Football Reference

Stuart Alan Voigt (born August 12, 1948) is an American former professional football player who was a tight end for 11 seasons with the Minnesota Vikings of the National Football League (NFL). He played college football for the Wisconsin Badgers.

== Early life and college ==
Born in the Westmorland district of Madison, Wisconsin, he graduated from Madison West High School in 1966, where he was an all-state running back and track and field standout. His state record in shot put of 66 ft 7 in (20.29 m) in 1966 stood for 39 years.

Voight accepted a football scholarship to the University of Wisconsin–Madison, where he also played on the baseball and track and field teams. Voight batted .350 in his two baseball seasons with the Badgers, while his track and field team won Big Ten Championships in all his seasons at the university. On the football team, he was a star halfback and tight end on some of the worst teams in Badger history, which won just three games in his three varsity years of 1967–1969, all in his senior season. As a senior, Voight was his team's leading receiver, catching 39 passes for 429 yards and 2 touchdowns. He finished his college career with 63 receptions for 704 yards and 3 touchdowns, along with 150 rushing yards and 3 more scores. In 2000, he was enshrined in Wisconsin's athletic hall of fame.

== Professional career ==
In the 1970 NFL draft, Voigt was selected in the tenth round by the Vikings. He played in three Super Bowls (VIII, IX, XI), all losses. He retired after the 1980 season with 177 receptions for 1,919 yards and 17 touchdowns. He then became a color commentator on Vikings radio broadcasts from 1981–1990 and 1997–2000.

== Personal life ==
Voigt is the former chairman of the board of First Commercial Bank in Bloomington, Minnesota. In April 2006, he approved a loan increase and extension to Hennessy Financial, LLC owner Jeffrey Gardner, who personally owed him $4.5 million. Gardner failed to disclose the debt.

Voigt faced charges in a Ponzi scheme: two counts of conspiracy to commit mail fraud; four counts of mail fraud; five counts of bank fraud; and seven counts of giving false statements on a loan application. He also faced sixteen counts of making monetary transactions in criminally-derived property, two counts of making false statements to the FDIC .

A federal jury convicted Voigt on one count of bank fraud, and was ordered to pay a $100,000 fine by U.S. District Judge Patrick Schiltz. He served a six-month sentence at Federal Prison Camp, Duluth, and was released on May 26, 2017.
