= Chuck Hutchison =

American football player (born 1948)

No. 65, 67
- Position: Offensive guard

Personal information
- Born: November 17, 1948 (age 77); Canton, Ohio, U.S.
- Listed height: 6 ft 3 in (1.91 m)
- Listed weight: 250 lb (113 kg)

Career information
- High school: Carrollton (Ohio)
- College: Ohio State (1966–1969)
- NFL draft: 1970: 2nd round, 38th overall pick

Career history
- St. Louis Cardinals (1970–1972); Cleveland Browns (1973–1976)

Awards and highlights
- First-team All-Big Ten (1969)

Career NFL statistics
- Games played: 47
- Games started: 17
- Fumble recoveries: 2
- Stats at Pro Football Reference

Charles Arthur Hutchison (born November 17, 1948) is an American former professional football player who was an offensive guard for six seasons in the National Football League (NFL) with the St. Louis Cardinals and Cleveland Browns. He was selected by the Cardinals in the second round of the 1970 NFL draft after playing college football for the Ohio State Buckeyes.

== Early life and college ==
Charles Arthur Hutchison was born on November 17, 1948, in Canton, Ohio. He attended Carrollton High School in Carrollton, Ohio.

Hutchison played for the Ohio State Buckeyes of Ohio State University. He was on the freshman team in 1966 and a three-year letterman from 1967 to 1969. He earned United Press International first-team All-Big Ten honors in 1969.

== Professional career ==
Hutchison was selected by the St. Louis Cardinals in the second round, with the 38th overall pick, of the 1970 NFL draft. He played in seven games for the Cardinals in 1970, 13 games in 1971, and four games (two starts) in 1972. On September 15, 1973, it was reported that he had been released by the Cardinals.

Hutchison was then signed to the Cleveland Browns' practice squad. He was later promoted to the active roster and played in two games for the Browns during the 1973 season. He appeared in seven games, starting one, in 1974. Hutchison started all 14 games for Cleveland in 1975 as the team finished with a 3–11 record. In 1976, Hutchinson had two knee operations within a span of seven months and ended up missing the entire 1976 season. In August 1977, he asked the Browns to waive him and the team did so. Earlier in the week the Browns had also attempted to trade him.

== Coaching career ==
Hutchison was later an offensive line coach for the Toronto Argonauts of the Canadian Football League from 1979 to 1981. He joined the Oakland Invaders in 1982. On March 13, 1984, Invaders head coach John Ralston was fired and Hutchison was named the team's interim head coach. At the time of his promotion, Hutchinson was serving as the team's offensive line coach and director of player personnel. The Invaders had a 7–8 record under Hutchison.
