= Alan Thompson (American football) =

American gridiron football player (born 1949)

No. 14, 22
- Position: Running back

Personal information
- Born: October 5, 1949 (age 77); Dallas, Texas, U.S.
- Listed height: 6 ft 0 in (1.83 m)
- Listed weight: 205 lb (93 kg)

Career information
- High school: James Madison (TX)
- College: Wisconsin
- NFL draft: 1972: 14th round, 363rd overall pick

Career history
- Ottawa Rough Riders (1972); Winnipeg Blue Bombers (1973)*; Philadelphia Bell (1974–1975)
- * Offseason or practice squad member only

Alan Thompson (born October 5, 1949) is an American former professional football running back in the Canadian Football League (CFL) for the Ottawa Rough Riders. He also was a member of the Philadelphia Bell in the World Football League (WFL). He played college football at the University of Wisconsin.

== Early life ==
Thompson attended James Madison High School, where he was a starter at running back. He accepted a football scholarship from the University of Wisconsin.

As a sophomore, he was named the starter at fullback. He had 220 rushing yards in his college debut against the University of Oklahoma. He led the team during the season, collecting 214 carries for 907 yards (fourth in the conference), a 4.2-yard average and 9 touchdowns.

As a junior, he was second on the team with 124 carries for 455 yards (3.7-yard avg.) and 5 touchdowns. As a senior, he was second on the team with 124 carries for 643 yards (5.2-yard avg.) and 6 touchdowns.

== Professional career ==
Thompson was selected by the Dallas Cowboys in the 14th round (363rd overall) of the 1972 NFL draft. On May 31, he instead opted to sign with the Ottawa Rough Riders of the Canadian Football League. He was a backup fullback, posting 18 carries for 94 yards (5.2-yard avg.).

In 1973, he signed with the Winnipeg Blue Bombers of the Canadian Football League. He was released on July 22.

In 1974, he signed with the Philadelphia Bell of the World Football League. He was a backup running back, registering 76 carries for 370 yards (4.9-yard avg.). In 1975, he tallied 20 carries for 68 yards (3.4-yard avg.), before the league folded mid-way through the season.
