= Ted Provost =

American gridiron football player (born 1948)

Profile
- Position: Defensive back

Personal information
- Born: July 26, 1948 (age 78); Navarre, Ohio, U.S.
- Listed height: 6 ft 2 in (1.88 m)
- Listed weight: 195 lb (88 kg)

Career information
- College: Ohio State
- NFL draft: 1970: 7th round, 162nd overall pick

Career history
- 1970: Minnesota Vikings
- 1971: St. Louis Cardinals
- 1972–1977: Saskatchewan Roughriders

Awards and highlights
- 2× CFL West All-Star (1973, 1974); National champion (1968); 2× Second-team All-American (1968, 1969); 2× First-team All-Big Ten (1968, 1969); Second-team All-Big Ten (1967); Ohio State Varsity O Hall of Fame (2006)
- Stats at Pro Football Reference

Ted 'Tree' Provost (born July 26, 1948) is a former star high school, university and professional football player.

As a high school athlete at Fairless High School he lettered three seasons as a quarterback and defensive back. He was also outstanding in basketball and track. He was inducted into the Stark County High School Football Hall of Fame in 2004.

Provost attended the Ohio State University and was a Buckeye from 1967 to 1969. He was key member of the 1968 national championship team as a safety. He was nicknamed "Tree" by legendary coach Woody Hayes after he collected so many of the "leaf" awards that were put on players helmets. The name did not come from his 6-foot 3 inch and 185 pound size. He was twice an All Big Ten all star (1968 and 1969) and was an All-American in 1969. His career interception total at Ohio State still ranks third all time He was inducted into the Ohio State Varsity O Hall of Fame in 2006.

He was drafted by the National Football League's Los Angeles Rams in the seventh round (162nd overall) of the 1970 NFL draft but was later traded to the Minnesota Vikings. He played 7 games with Minnesota in 1970 and 2 games with the St. Louis Cardinals in 1971.

Provost continued as a professional with the Saskatchewan Roughriders of the Canadian Football League, playing five seasons from 1972 to 1977. He was twice named an All-West Division all-star.

Ted Provost was successful after his football career, owner of Ted Provost Builders, a construction company in Hilliard, Ohio. He and his wife 2nd wife Ruth have three children, Michael, Douglas, and Molly.

On September 24, 2010, Provost was inducted into the Fairless High School Hall of Honor.
