= John Isenbarger =

American football player (1947–2024)

No. 17
- Position: Wide receiver

Personal information
- Born: December 5, 1947; Muncie, Indiana, U.S.
- Died: March 2024 (aged 76)
- Listed height: 6 ft 3 in (1.91 m)
- Listed weight: 203 lb (92 kg)

Career information
- High school: Muncie Central
- College: Indiana
- NFL draft: 1970: 2nd round, 48th overall pick

Career history
- San Francisco 49ers (1970–1973)

Awards and highlights
- Second-team All-American (1969); First-team All-Big Ten (1969); Second-team All-Big Ten (1968)

Career NFL statistics
- Games played: 55
- Rushing attempts-yards: 27-80
- Receptions-yards: 21-291
- Touchdowns: 2
- Stats at Pro Football Reference

John Phillips Isenbarger (December 5, 1947 – March 2024) was an American professional football player who was a wide receiver for the San Francisco 49ers of the National Football League (NFL). He played college football for the Indiana Hoosiers.

== Football career ==
=== College football ===
Isenbarger played college football at Indiana University Bloomington.

=== Professional football ===
Isenbarger played four seasons for the San Francisco 49ers between 1970 and 1973. In 1974, he signed with the Hawaiians of the upstart World Football League (WFL) where he had his best season as a pro catching 33 passes for 368 yards and 7 touchdowns. He retired from playing following the 1974 season.

== Death ==
John Isenbarger's death was announced on March 7, 2024. He was 76.
