= Don Highsmith =

American football player (born 1948)

No. 32
- Position: Running back

Personal information
- Born: March 12, 1948 (age 78); New Brunswick, New Jersey, U.S.
- Listed height: 6 ft 0 in (1.83 m)
- Listed weight: 210 lb (95 kg)

Career information
- High school: New Brunswick
- College: Michigan State
- NFL draft: 1970: 13th round, 336th overall pick

Career history
- Oakland Raiders (1970–1972); Green Bay Packers (1973)

Career NFL statistics
- Rushing attempts-yards: 94-327
- Receptions-yards: 12-143
- Touchdowns: 2
- Stats at Pro Football Reference

Donald Cornelius Highsmith (born March 12, 1948) is an American former professional football player who was a running back for four seasons in the National Football League (NFL). He played college football for the Michigan State Spartans. He in the NFL for the Green Bay Packers and the Oakland Raiders.

Highsmith went on to play for the Charlotte Hornets in the World Football League (WFL) and led the team in rushing. He was an all star. He went to Michigan State University on a track and field scholarship, although he was an outstanding running back for New Brunswick High School in his hometown of New Brunswick, New Jersey.
