= Indiana–Michigan State football rivalry =

American college football rivalry

- Indiana Hoosiers Michigan State Spartans
- First meeting: October 28, 1922; Indiana, 14–6
- Latest meeting: October 18, 2025; Indiana, 38–13
- Next meeting: 2027
- Trophy: Old Brass Spittoon

Statistics
- Total meetings: 72
- All-time series: Michigan State leads, 49–20–2
- Trophy series: Michigan State leads, 49–16–1
- Largest victory: Michigan State, 54–0 (1957)
- Longest win streak: Michigan State, 8 (1950–1957)
- Longest unbeaten streak: Michigan State, 9 (1970–1982)
- Current win streak: Indiana, 2 (2024–present)

Locations of Indiana and Michigan State

The Battle for the Old Brass Spittoon is an American college football rivalry between the Indiana Hoosiers and Michigan State Spartans.

== History ==
The Old Brass Spittoon is awarded to the winner of the game. It was first presented in 1950. This tradition was started by class president, Eugene McDermott of Allentown, PA.

Prior to the expansion of the Big Ten in 2011, there were stoppages in the series because the schools were not protected rivals in the rotating conference schedule (with no games played in 1971 and 1972, 1979 and 1980, 1999 and 2000, and 2009 and 2010).

With the split of the Big Ten into divisions starting in 2011, Indiana and Michigan State were placed in separate divisions but were assigned as "cross-over" rivals, meaning they played each other every year. This arrangement lasted through the 2013 season. After the addition of Maryland and Rutgers into the Big Ten starting in 2014, the subsequent geographical realignment of the divisions placed both Indiana and Michigan State in the Big Ten East, assuring that the rivalry will be renewed annually.

In 2015, Michigan State defeated Indiana en route to a Big Ten Championship and a spot in the College Football Playoff.

With the additions of Oregon, UCLA, USC, and Washington in 2023, the Big Ten announced league football opponents for the 2024 to 2028 seasons. Indiana and Michigan State was not kept as a protected matchup. They are scheduled to meet in 2024, 2025, and 2027.

In 2025, Indiana defeated Michigan State 38–13 on their way to the program's third-ever Big Ten title, second consecutive College Football Playoff appearance, and first national championship.

== Game results ==
Indiana victories	Michigan State victories	Tie games	Forfeited win (Note: Michigan State forfeited all five wins from the 1994 season due to use of an ineligible player.) / Vacated win (Note: Michigan State vacated all four wins from the 2023 season due to use of three ineligible players.)

No.	Date	Location	Winner	Score
1	October 28, 1922	Bloomington, IN	Indiana	14–6
2	November 5, 1927	Bloomington, IN	Indiana	33–7
3	November 18, 1939	East Lansing, MI	Tie	7–7
4	November 9, 1940	Bloomington, IN	Indiana	20–0
5	November 4, 1950	East Lansing, MI	#13 Michigan State	35–0
6	November 17, 1951	Bloomington, IN	#1 Michigan State	30–26
7	November 8, 1952	Bloomington, IN	#1 Michigan State	41–14
8	October 17, 1953	East Lansing, MI	#2 Michigan State	47–18
9	October 9, 1954	Bloomington, IN	Michigan State	21–14
10	September 24, 1955	Bloomington, IN	Michigan State	20–13
11	October 13, 1956	East Lansing, MI	#2 Michigan State	53–6
12	September 28, 1957	East Lansing, MI	#4 Michigan State	54–0
13	November 8, 1958	Bloomington, IN	Indiana	6–0
14	October 24, 1959	East Lansing, MI	Michigan State	14–6
15	October 22, 1960	Bloomington, IN	#13 Michigan State	35–0
16	October 28, 1961	East Lansing, MI	#1 Michigan State	35–0
17	October 27, 1962	Bloomington, IN	#10 Michigan State	26–8
18	October 19, 1963	East Lansing, MI	Michigan State	20–3
19	October 17, 1964	Bloomington, IN	Indiana	27–20
20	November 13, 1965	East Lansing, MI	#1 Michigan State	27–13
21	November 12, 1966	Bloomington, IN	#2 Michigan State	37–19
22	November 11, 1967	East Lansing, MI	#6 Indiana	14–13
23	November 9, 1968	East Lansing, MI	Indiana	24–22
24	November 1, 1969	East Lansing, MI	Indiana	16–0
25	October 31, 1970	Bloomington, IN	Michigan State	32–7
26	November 17, 1973	East Lansing, MI	Michigan State	10–9
27	November 16, 1974	Bloomington, IN	#15 Michigan State	19–10
28	November 8, 1975	Bloomington, IN	Michigan State	14–6
29	November 6, 1976	East Lansing, MI	Michigan State	23–0
30	October 15, 1977	Bloomington, IN	Tie	13–13
31	October 21, 1978	East Lansing, MI	Michigan State	49–14
32	October 31, 1981	East Lansing, MI	Michigan State	26–3
33	October 30, 1982	Bloomington, IN	Michigan State	22–14
34	October 15, 1983	Bloomington, IN	Indiana	24–12
35	October 13, 1984	East Lansing, MI	Michigan State	13–6
36	November 9, 1985	Bloomington, IN	Michigan State	35–16
37	November 8, 1986	East Lansing, MI	Indiana	17–14

No.	Date	Location	Winner	Score
38	November 14, 1987	East Lansing, MI	#13 Michigan State	27–3
39	November 12, 1988	Bloomington, IN	Michigan State	38–12
40	November 4, 1989	Bloomington, IN	Michigan State	51–20
41	November 3, 1990	East Lansing, MI	Michigan State	45–20
42	October 5, 1991	Bloomington, IN	Indiana	31–0
43	October 3, 1992	East Lansing, MI	Michigan State	42–31
44	October 30, 1993	Bloomington, IN	#23 Indiana	10–0
45	October 29, 1994	East Lansing, MI	Michigan State	27–21
46	November 11, 1995	Bloomington, IN	Michigan State	31–3
47	November 9, 1996	East Lansing, MI	Michigan State	38–15
48	October 11, 1997	Bloomington, IN	#11 Michigan State	38–6
49	October 10, 1998	East Lansing, MI	Michigan State	38–31
50	November 10, 2001	East Lansing, MI	Indiana	37–28
51	November 9, 2002	Bloomington, IN	Michigan State	56–21
52	October 4, 2003	East Lansing, MI	#25 Michigan State	31–3
53	September 25, 2004	Bloomington, IN	Michigan State	30–20
54	October 29, 2005	East Lansing, MI	Michigan State	46–15
55	October 28, 2006	Bloomington, IN	Indiana	46–21
56	October 13, 2007	East Lansing, MI	Michigan State	52–27
57	September 27, 2008	Bloomington, IN	Michigan State	42–29
58	November 19, 2011	East Lansing, MI	#12 Michigan State	55–3
59	October 6, 2012	Bloomington, IN	Michigan State	31–27
60	October 12, 2013	East Lansing, MI	Michigan State	42–28
61	October 18, 2014	Bloomington, IN	#8 Michigan State	56–17
62	October 24, 2015	East Lansing, MI	#7 Michigan State	52–26
63	October 1, 2016	Bloomington, IN	Indiana	24–21^{OT}
64	October 21, 2017	East Lansing, MI	#18 Michigan State	17–9
65	September 22, 2018	Bloomington, IN	#24 Michigan State	35–21
66	September 28, 2019	East Lansing, MI	#25 Michigan State	40–31
67	November 14, 2020	East Lansing, MI	#10 Indiana	24–0
68	October 16, 2021	Bloomington, IN	#10 Michigan State	20–15
69	November 19, 2022	East Lansing, MI	Indiana	39–31^{2OT}
70	November 18, 2023	Bloomington, IN	Michigan State^{†}	24–21
71	November 2, 2024	East Lansing, MI	#13 Indiana	47–10
72	October 18, 2025	Bloomington, IN	#3 Indiana	38–13
Series: Michigan State leads 49–20–2

By decade (through 2025).

Indiana advantage	Michigan State advantage	Tie

Decade	Indiana	Michigan State	Tie
1920s	2		
1930s			1
1940s	1		
1950s	1	9	
1960s	4	6	
1970s		6	1
1980s	2	7	
1990s	3	6	
2000s	2	6	
2010s	1	8	
2020s	4	1	
Total	20	49	2

== See also ==
- List of NCAA college football rivalry games
