= 1974 Buffalo Bills season =

15th season in franchise history; first NFL playoff appearance

- Owner: Ralph Wilson
- Head coach: Lou Saban
- Home stadium: Rich Stadium

Results
- Record: 9–5
- Division place: 2nd AFC East
- Playoffs: Lost Divisional Playoffs (at Steelers) 14–32
- Pro Bowlers: RB O.J. Simpson; CB Robert James

The 1974 Buffalo Bills season was the franchise's 5th season in the National Football League, and the 15th overall. Buffalo made the NFL playoffs for the first time and reached the postseason for the first time in eight seasons. In the divisional playoffs the Bills lost to the eventual champions, the Pittsburgh Steelers, 32–14, in Pittsburgh.

As it turned out, this was running back O. J. Simpson's only playoff appearance of his career. Buffalo did not make the playoffs again until 1980, three years after the trade of Simpson to San Francisco. In his only playoff game, Simpson finished with 49 rushing yards on 11 carries and 0 touchdowns, though he did catch a touchdown pass from Joe Ferguson in the 3rd quarter.

Buffalo debuted their new uniforms and helmets in 1974, replacing the red "standing buffalo" with the "streaking bison." This updated look was first displayed before a national audience on the first Monday Night Football game of the season, in a dramatic 21–20 victory over Oakland.

Simpson, coming off consecutive rushing titles, did not lead the league in 1974, but did cross the 1,000-yard barrier despite a sore knee.

Buffalo's defense was far more stout than it had been in previous years, as it gave up 3,489 yards in 1974, fifth-fewest in the NFL. The Bills' 1,611 passing yards allowed were the third-best in the league.

In Week 3 of the season against the New York Jets, the Bills did not complete a pass. Despite this, they still managed to defeat the Jets, behind 223 combined Buffalo rushing yards while holding Jets quarterback Joe Namath to two completions (on 18 attempts) This was the last time a team won a game without completing a pass until the Tampa Bay Buccaneers did so in 2026.

== Offseason ==
=== NFL draft ===
Oklahoma State tight end Reuben Gant played his entire seven-year career with the Bills. Quarterback Gary Marangi was the Bills' backup quarterback for three seasons; in 1976, he started the final seven games of the season when starter Joe Ferguson was injured for the season with a back injury.

1974 Buffalo Bills draft
Round	Pick	Player	Position	College	Notes
1	18	Reuben Gant	Tight end	Oklahoma State	
2	27	Doug Allen	Linebacker	Penn State	
3	70	Gary Marangi	Quarterback	Boston College	
4	95	Carlester Crumpler	Running back	East Carolina	
5	106	Gary Hayman	Wide receiver	Penn State	
5	122	Tim Guy	Offensive tackle	Oregon	
8	203	Greg Hare	Quarterback	Ohio State	
9	226	Brian Doherty	Punter	Notre Dame	
10	241	Art Cameron	Tight end	Albany State	
10	249	Don Calhoun	Running back	Kansas State	
11	278	Rod Kirby	Linebacker	Pittsburgh	
12	303	Dave Means	Defensive end	Southeast Missouri State	
13	331	Ed Gatewood	Linebacker	Tennessee State	
14	339	Phil Lamm	Defensive back	North Carolina	
14	355	Phil Gurbada	Defensive back	Mayville State	
15	382	Ken Williams	Linebacker	Southwestern Louisiana	
16	406	Sanford Qvale	Offensive tackle	North Dakota State	
17	434	Sal Casola	Placekicker	Cincinnati	
Made roster

== Personnel ==
=== Staff/Coaches ===
1974 Buffalo Bills staff
Front office: President – Ralph Wilson; Vice President and General Manager – Bob Lustig; Vice President – Pat McGroder; Head coaches: Head Coach – Lou Saban; Offensive coaches: Receivers – Bob Shaw; Offensive Line – Jim Ringo	Defensive coaches: Defensive Line – Stan Jones; Linebackers – John Ray; Defensive Backfield – Bill Atkins; Special teams coaches: Special Teams – Ed Cavanaugh

=== Roster ===
1974 Buffalo Bills roster
Quarterbacks (QB): 12 Joe Ferguson; 16 Scott Hunter; 17 Gary Marangi; Running backs (RB): 34 Jim Braxton; 29 Don Calhoun; 32 O. J. Simpson; 36 Larry Watkins; Wide receivers (WR): 81 Bob Chandler; 89 Wallace Francis; 47 Clint Haslerig; 40 J. D. Hill; 27 Ahmad Rashad; Tight ends (TE): 88 Reuben Gant; 37 Ted Koy; 87 Paul Seymour	Offensive linemen (OL): 60 Bill Adams G; 68 Joe DeLamielleure G; 70 Dave Foley T; 74 Donnie Green T; 76 Halvor Hagen T; 51 Bruce Jarvis C; 67 Reggie McKenzie G; 53 Mike Montler C; 65 Nick Nighswander C; 61 Willie Parker G; Defensive linemen (DL): 64 Dave Costa DE; 72 Don Croft DT; 74 Earl Edwards DE; 71 Mike Kadish DT; 77 Dave Means DE; 85 Walt Patulski DE; 62 Jeff Yeates DT	Linebackers (LB): 59 Doug Allen OLB; 50 Jim Cheyunski MLB; 30 Bo Cornell OLB; 52 Merv Krakau MLB; 86 Dave Washington OLB; Defensive backs (DB): 22 Bill Cahill FS; 42 Neal Craig SS; 43 Tony Greene FS; 28 Dwight Harrison CB; 20 Robert James CB; 45 Rex Kern CB; 24 Al Randolph SS; 26 Donnie Walker FS; Special teams (ST): 7 Marv Bateman P; 3 John Leypoldt K	Reserve: 21 Gary Hayman RB (IR); 55 John Skorupan LB (IR); 75 Jeff Winans DT (IR); Rookies in italics

== Regular season ==
=== Schedule ===
Week	Date	Opponent	Result	Record	Venue	Recap
1	September 16	Oakland Raiders	**W** 21–20	1–0	Rich Stadium	Recap
2	September 22	**Miami Dolphins**	**L** 16–24	1–1	Rich Stadium	Recap
3	September 29	**New York Jets**	**W** 16–12	2–1	Rich Stadium	Recap
4	October 6	at Green Bay Packers	**W** 27–7	3–1	Lambeau Field	Recap
5	October 13	at **Baltimore Colts**	**W** 27–14	4–1	Memorial Stadium	Recap
6	October 20	**New England Patriots**	**W** 30–28	5–1	Rich Stadium	Recap
7	October 27	Chicago Bears	**W** 16–6	6–1	Rich Stadium	Recap
8	November 3	at **New England Patriots**	**W** 29–28	7–1	Schaefer Stadium	Recap
9	November 10	Houston Oilers	**L** 9–21	7–2	Rich Stadium	Recap
10	November 17	at **Miami Dolphins**	**L** 28–35	7–3	Miami Orange Bowl	Recap
11	November 24	at Cleveland Browns	**W** 15–10	8–3	Cleveland Stadium	Recap
12	December 1	**Baltimore Colts**	**W** 6–0	9–3	Rich Stadium	Recap
13	December 8	at **New York Jets**	**L** 10–20	9–4	Shea Stadium	Recap
14	December 15	at Los Angeles Rams	**L** 14–19	9–5	Los Angeles Memorial Coliseum	Recap
Note: Intra-division opponents are in **bold** text.

=== Game summaries ===
==== Week 1 ====
  - Buffalo Snaps the Raiders MNF winning streak**

Team	1	2	3	4	Total
Raiders	0	3	7	10	20
• Bills	0	7	0	14	21

- Date: September 16
- Location: Rich Stadium, Orchard Park, New York
- Game start: 9:00 p.m.
- Game weather: 59 °F (15 °C), wind 13 mph (21 km/h)
- Referee: Ben Dreith
- **TV announcers (**ABC Monday Night Football): Frank Gifford, Howard Cosell, Alex Karras

Scoring summary
2	BUF	J.D. Hill 24 yard pass from Joe Ferguson (John Leypoldt kick)	Bills 7–0
2	OAK	George Blanda 34 yard field goal	Bills 7–3
3	OAK	Clarence Davis 15 yard run (George Blanda kick)	Raiders 10–7
4	OAK	George Blanda 41 yard field goal	Raiders 13–7
4	BUF	Ahmad Rashad 8 yard pass from Joe Ferguson (John Leypoldt kick)	Bills 14–13
4	OAK	Art Thoms 29 yard fumble return (George Blanda kick)	Raiders 20–14
4	BUF	Ahmad Rashad 13 yard pass from Joe Ferguson (John Leypoldt kick)	Bills 21–20

==== Week 8 ====
Team	1	2	3	4	Total
• **Bills**	6	13	7	3	29
Patriots	7	14	7	0	28

- Date: November 3
- Location: Schaefer Stadium, Foxboro, Massachusetts
- Game start: 1:00 p.m. EST
- Game weather: 46 °F (8 °C), wind 7 mph (11 km/h)
- Referee: Ben Dreith
- Source: Pro-Football-Reference.com

Scoring summary
1	Bills	John Leypoldt 45 yard field goal	Bills 3–0
1	Patriots	Mack Herron 43 yard pass from Jim Plunkett (John Smith kick)	Patriots 7–3
1	Bills	John Leypoldt 20 yard field goal	Patriots 7–6
2	Patriots	Mack Herron 20 yard pass from Jim Plunkett (John Smith kick)	Patriots 14–6
2	Bills	Ahmad Rashad 25 yard pass from Joe Ferguson (kick failed)	Patriots 14–12
2	Patriots	Sam Cunningham 31 yard run (John Smith kick)	Patriots 21–12
2	Bills	O. J. Simpson 1 yard run (John Leypoldt kick)	Patriots 21–19
3	Bills	Dave Washington 72 yard interception return (John Leypoldt kick)	Bills 26–21
3	Patriots	Mack Herron 2 yard run (John Smith kick)	Patriots 28–26
4	Bills	John Leypoldt 47 yard field goal	Bills 29–28

=== Standings ===
AFC East
	W	L	T	PCT	DIV	CONF	PF	PA	STK
Miami Dolphins	11	3	0	.786	6–2	9–2	327	216	W3
Buffalo Bills	9	5	0	.643	5–3	7–4	264	244	L2
New York Jets	7	7	0	.500	4–4	5–6	279	300	W6
New England Patriots	7	7	0	.500	4–4	4–7	348	289	L3
Baltimore Colts	2	12	0	.143	1–7	1–10	190	329	L4

== Playoffs ==
AFC Divisional Playoff: Buffalo Bills (9–5) at Pittsburgh Steelers (10–3–1)

Quarter	1	2	3	4	Total
Bills	7	0	7	0	14
Steelers	3	26	0	3	32

at Three Rivers Stadium, Pittsburgh, Pennsylvania

- Date: December 22
- Game time: 1:00 p.m.
- Game weather: Light snow, 33 °F (1 °C)
- Game attendance: 48,321
- Referee: Norm Schachter
- TV announcers (NBC): Jim Simpson and John Brodie
- Box Score

Game information

First quarter

- PIT – Roy Gerela 21-yard field goal. Steelers 3–0.
- BUF – Paul Seymour 22-yard pass from Joe Ferguson (John Leypoldt kick). Bills 7–3.

Second quarter

- PIT – Rocky Bleier 27-yard pass from Terry Bradshaw. Steelers 9–7.
- PIT – Franco Harris 1-yard run (Roy Gerela kick). Steelers 16–7.
- PIT – Franco Harris 4-yard run. Steelers 22–7.
- PIT – Franco Harris 1-yard run (Roy Gerela kick). Steelers 29–7.

Third quarter

- BUF – O. J. Simpson 3-yard pass from Joe Ferguson (John Leypoldt kick). Steelers 29–14.

Fourth quarter

- PIT – Roy Gerela 22-yard field goal. Steelers 32–14.

Top passers

- BUF – Joe Ferguson – 11/26, 164 yards, 2 TD
- PIT – Terry Bradshaw – 12/19, 203 yards, TD

Top rushers

- BUF – O. J. Simpson – 15 rushes, 49 yards
- PIT – Franco Harris – 24 rushes, 74 yards, 3 TD

Top receivers

- BUF – J.D. Hill – 4 receptions, 59 yards
- PIT – Lynn Swann – 3 receptions, 60 yards
