= 1976 Buffalo Bills season =

17th season in franchise history

- Owner: Ralph Wilson
- Head coach: Lou Saban (resigned); Jim Ringo (interim)
- Home stadium: Rich Stadium

Results
- Record: 2–12
- Division place: 5th AFC East
- Playoffs: Did not qualify
- All-Pros: G Joe DeLamielleure (1st team); RB O. J. Simpson (1st team)
- Pro Bowlers: G Joe DeLamielleure; RB O. J. Simpson

The 1976 Buffalo Bills season was the franchise's 7th season in the National Football League, and the 17th overall.

Buffalo's season was troubled from the start, as the team was in a contract dispute with star running back O. J. Simpson. Simpson had been demanding a trade, before finally agreeing to a three-year, $2.5 million contract.

The Bills started the season 2–2, before losing their final ten games of the season. Quarterback Joe Ferguson only started the first seven games before being sidelined for the season with a back injury. Backup quarterback Gary Marangi started Buffalo's final seven games, all losses.

Fullback Jim Braxton injured his knee in the Bills' season opener and was lost for the season. Simpson still led the NFL in rushing in 1976, even without Braxton's blocking.

Bills head coach Lou Saban resigned after the fifth game of the season, with the Bills struggling at 2–3. Offensive line coach Jim Ringo took over, but would not win a game for the rest of the year.

The lowest point of the season was when O. J. Simpson was ejected from a game for getting into a fight with New England Patriots defensive end Mel Lunsford. Lunsford was also ejected from the game. Neither player was fined or suspended by the league.

== Offseason ==
Before the 1976 season, Buffalo lost some key players, notably wide receivers Ahmad Rashad and J. D. Hill, and defensive linemen Earl Edwards, Walt Patulski and Pat Toomay.

=== 1976 expansion draft ===
Buffalo Bills selected during the expansion draft
Round	Overall	Name	Position	Expansion team
0	0	Gary Hayman	Running back	Seattle Seahawks
0	0	Frank Oliver	Defensive back	Tampa Bay Buccaneers
0	0	Pat Toomay	Defensive end	Tampa Bay Buccaneers

=== NFL draft ===
Note: 1976 was the final year in which the NFL draft was seventeen rounds; it would be reduced to twelve rounds in 1977.

The Bills' 1976 draft produced four long-time starters with their first four picks. First round pick Mario Clark played for seven seasons with the Bills. Offensive guard Ken Jones played for the Bills for eleven years. Offensive tackle Joe Devlin played every game of his 14-year career with the Bills, playing in all 191 regular-season games until his retirement after the 1989 season. Defensive end Ben Williams played for the Bills for 10 years; he was a Pro Bowler and second-team All-Pro for the 1982 season.

1976 Buffalo Bills draft
Round	Pick	Player	Position	College	Notes
1	18	Mario Clark	Cornerback	Oregon	
2	42	Ken Jones	Guard	Arkansas State	
2	52	Joe Devlin	Offensive tackle	Iowa	
3	78	Ben Williams *	Defensive end	Ole Miss	
4	109	Dan Jilek	Linebacker	Michigan	
5	142	Fred Coleman	Tight end	Northeast Louisiana	
6	164	Leslie Benson	Defensive end	Baylor	
6	171	Scott Piper	Wide receiver	Arizona	
6	175	Darnell Powell	Running back	Tennessee-Chattanooga	
7	195	Jackie Williams	Defensive back	Texas A&M	
8	215	Scott Gardner	Quarterback	Virginia	
8	226	Bobby Joe Easter	Running back	Middle Tennessee State	
8	227	Art Meadowcroft	Guard	Minnesota	
9	241	Jeff Turner	Linebacker	Kansas	
9	255	Bob Kotzur	Defensive tackle	Southwest Texas State	
10	280	Keith Moody	Cornerback	Syracuse	
11	309	Forry Smith	Wide receiver	Iowa State	
12	336	Joe Lowery	Running back	Jackson State	
13	365	Will Wilcox	Guard	Texas	
14	392	Tony Williams	Wide receiver	Middle Tennessee State	
15	421	Arnold Robinson	Linebacker	Bethune-Cookman	
16	448	Gary Gorrell	Linebacker	Boise State	
17	477	Bob Berg	Kicker	New Mexico	
Made roster * Made at least one Pro Bowl during career

== Personnel ==
=== Staff/coaches ===
1976 Buffalo Bills staff
Front office
- Majority owner/team president – Ralph Wilson
- Vice President & General Manager – Bob Lustig
- Vice president/minority owner – Pat McGroder

Coaching staff

- Head coach – Lou Saban
- Interim Head/Assistant Coach - Jim Ringo

Offensive coaches

- Running backs coach – Jim LaRue
- Offensive line coaches – Jim Ringo & Marvin Bass

Defensive/Special teams coaches

- Defensive Coordinator / Defensive Backs Coach - Richie McCabe
- Defensive line – Jerry Wampfler
- Linebackers – John Ray
- Defensive backfield – Billy Atkins
- Special teams – Ed Cavanaugh

Scouting

- Director of Scouting - Marvin Bass

=== Roster ===
1976 Buffalo Bills roster
Quarterbacks (QB): 17 Gary Marangi; 14 Sam Wyche; Running backs (RB): 25 Roland Hooks; 36 Jeff Kinney; 38 Eddie Ray; 33 Andy Reid; 32 O. J. Simpson; Wide receivers (WR): 81 Bob Chandler; 86 Emmett Edwards; 80 John Holland; Tight ends (TE): 88 Reuben Gant; 87 Paul Seymour	Offensive linemen (OL): 60 Bill Adams T; 68 Joe DeLamielleure G; 70 Dave Foley T; 76 Joe Devlin T; 74 Donnie Green T; 67 Reggie McKenzie G; 53 Mike Montler C; 65 Bob Patton C; Defensive linemen (DL): 50 Mark Johnson DE; 69 Ken Jones DE; 71 Mike Kadish DT; 75 Jeff Lloyd DT; 79 Marty Smith DT; 85 Tody Smith DE; 83 Sherman White DE; 77 Ben Williams DE	Linebackers (LB): 30 Bo Cornell OLB; 51 Dan Jilek OLB; 52 Merv Krakau MLB; 56 Bob Nelson MLB; 54 Tom Ruud OLB; 55 John Skorupan OLB; Defensive backs (DB): 23 Clifford Brooks SS; 29 Mario Clark CB; 22 Steve Freeman FS; 43 Tony Greene FS; 28 Dwight Harrison CB; 24 Doug Jones SS; 46 Keith Moody CB; Special teams (ST): 7 Marv Bateman P; 5 George Jakowenko K	Reserve: 34 Jim Braxton RB (IR); 85 Fred Coleman TE (IR); 12 Joe Ferguson QB (IR); 21 Van Green S (IR); 20 Robert James CB (IR); 61 Willie Parker C/G (IR); 35 Darnell Powell RB (IR); Rookies in italics

== Regular season ==
=== Schedule ===
Week	Date	Opponent	Result	Record	Venue	Attendance
1	September 13	**Miami Dolphins**	**L** 21–30	0–1	Rich Stadium	77,683
2	September 19	Houston Oilers	**L** 3–13	0–2	Rich Stadium	61,384
3	September 26	at Tampa Bay Buccaneers	**W** 14–9	1–2	Tampa Stadium	44,505
4	October 3	Kansas City Chiefs	**W** 50–17	2–2	Rich Stadium	51,909
5	October 10	at **New York Jets**	**L** 14–17	2–3	Shea Stadium	59,110
6	October 17	**Baltimore Colts**	**L** 13–31	2–4	Rich Stadium	71,009
7	October 24	**New England Patriots**	**L** 22–26	2–5	Rich Stadium	45,144
8	October 31	**New York Jets**	**L** 14–19	2–6	Rich Stadium	41,285
9	November 7	at **New England Patriots**	**L** 10–20	2–7	Schaefer Stadium	61,157
10	November 15	at Dallas Cowboys	**L** 10–17	2–8	Texas Stadium	51,799
11	November 21	San Diego Chargers	**L** 13–34	2–9	Rich Stadium	36,539
12	November 25	at Detroit Lions	**L** 14–27	2–10	Pontiac Metropolitan Stadium	66,875
13	December 5	at **Miami Dolphins**	**L** 27–45	2–11	Miami Orange Bowl	43,475
14	December 12	at **Baltimore Colts**	**L** 20–58	2–12	Memorial Stadium	50,451
Note: Intra-division opponents are in **bold** text.

=== Season summary ===
==== Week 3 ====
Team	1	2	3	4	Total
• Bills	0	7	0	7	14
Buccaneers	6	0	0	3	9

- Date: September 26
- Location: Tampa Stadium, Tampa, FL
- Game start: 1:00 p.m.
- Game weather: 80 °F or 26.7 °C; wind 6 miles per hour (9.7 km/h; 5.2 kn)
- Television network: NBC

Scoring summary
Q1	TB	Green 39 yard field goal	TB 3–0
Q1	TB	Green 24 yard field goal	TB 6–0
Q2	BUF	Chandler 58 yard pass from Ferguson (Ricardo kick)	BUF 7–6
Q4	TB	Green 19 yard field goal	TB 9–7
Q4	BUF	Gant 15 yard pass from Ferguson (Ricardo kick)	BUF 14–9

==== Week 4 ====
Team	1	2	3	4	Total
Chiefs	0	10	7	0	17
• **Bills**	16	7	7	20	50

- Date: October 3
- Location: Rich Stadium, Orchard Park, New York
- Game start: 1:00 p.m. EST
- Game weather: 55 °F or 12.8 °C, wind 7 miles per hour (11 km/h; 6.1 kn)

Scoring summary
1	BUF	George Jakowenko 30 yard field goal	Bills 3–0
1	BUF	Bob Chandler 1 yard pass from Joe Ferguson (George Jakowenko kick)	Bills 10–0
1	BUF	Bob Chandler 5 yard pass from Joe Ferguson (kick failed)	Bills 16–0
2	KC	Henry Marshall 31 yard pass from Tony Adams (Jan Stenerud kick)	Bills 16–7
2	BUF	Bob Chandler 7 yard pass from Joe Ferguson (George Jakowenko kick)	Bills 23–7
2	KC	Jan Stenerud 33 yard field goal	Bills 23–10
3	BUF	Jeff Kinney 1 yard run (George Jakowenko kick)	Bills 30–10
3	KC	Tommy Reamon 49 yard pass from Tony Adams (Jan Stenerud kick)	Bills 30–17
4	BUF	O. J. Simpson 1 yard run (kick failed)	Bills 36–17
4	BUF	O. J. Simpson 5 yard run (George Jakowenko kick)	Bills 43–17
4	BUF	Tony Greene 101 yard interception return (George Jakowenko kick)	Bills 50–17

==== Week 12 ====
O. J. Simpson rushed for 273 yards, setting a Thanksgiving Day record that still holds as of the end of the 2016 season.

=== Standings ===
AFC East
	W	L	T	PCT	DIV	CONF	PF	PA	STK
^{(2)} Baltimore Colts	11	3	0	.786	7–1	11–1	417	246	W1
^{(4)} New England Patriots	11	3	0	.786	6–2	10–2	376	236	W6
Miami Dolphins	6	8	0	.429	5–3	6–6	263	264	L1
New York Jets	3	11	0	.214	2–6	3–9	169	383	L4
Buffalo Bills	2	12	0	.143	0–8	2–10	245	363	L10

== Awards and honors ==
- O. J. Simpson, Thanksgiving Day Record, Most Rushing Yards in One Game, 273 yards vs. Detroit Lions, November 25

== See also ==
- Electric Company
