= 1972 Buffalo Bills season =

13th season in franchise history

- Owner: Ralph Wilson
- Head coach: Lou Saban
- Home stadium: War Memorial Stadium

Results
- Record: 4–9–1
- Division place: 4th AFC East
- Playoffs: Did not qualify
- Pro Bowlers: WR J.D. Hill; CB Robert James; RB O.J. Simpson

The 1972 Buffalo Bills season was the franchise’s third season in the National Football League, and thirteenth overall. It was also their last season at War Memorial Stadium which had been their home field since the franchise started in 1960.

== Season summary ==
Coming off a 1-13 record the previous season, the Bills had the first overall pick in the draft, which they used to select Notre Dame defensive end Walt Patulski. This came after the Bills allowed 394 points the previous season. The 1972 season marked the return of former Bills coach Lou Saban, (Note: Saban had coached the Bills from 1962 to 1965 before leaving for the University of Maryland) who had previously led the team to two AFL Championships. Saban had a new offensive philosophy for Buffalo in 1972. In his first three seasons, former number one overall pick O. J. Simpson had only carried the ball an average of 161 times per season. Saban rushed Simpson 292 times in 1972, the second-most in the league behind the Giants' Ron Johnson.

Despite losing two starting offensive lineman – center Bruce Jarvis and guard Jim Reilly—in the season opener, O. J. Simpson still led the league in rushing with 1,251 yards. This would be was Simpson’s first of four rushing titles over the next five seasons.

Although the Bills had a potent, yard-gaining rushing attack, they could not put enough points on the scoreboard, scoring only 257 points (18.3 per game) all season, nineteenth in the league out of 26 teams. Furthermore, Buffalo's defense gave up 377 points (23.5 per game), the third-most in the NFL in 1972. As of 2023, this season was the most recent in which the Bills recorded a tie game.

== Offseason ==
=== NFL draft ===
1972 Buffalo Bills draft
| Round | Pick | Player | Position | College | Notes |
| 1 | 1 | Walt Patulski | DE | Notre Dame | |
| 2 | 27 | Reggie McKenzie (Note: Made 1973 First Team All-Pro and Second Team All-Pro in 1974 and 1975.) | G | Michigan | |
| 4 | 79 | Randy Jackson | RB | Wichita State | |
| 5 | 105 | Leon Garror | DB | Alcorn A&M | |
| 5 | 108 | Bob Penchion | G | Alcorn A&M | |
| 8 | 183 | Paul Gibson | WR | UTEP | |
| 10 | 235 | Maurice Tyler | DB | Morgan State | |
| 13 | 313 | Eddie Moss | RB | Southeast Missouri State | |
| 14 | 340 | Karl Salb | DT | Kansas | |
| 16 | 391 | Brian Linstrom | QB | Arizona | |
| 17 | 417 | John Shelley | DB | Oklahoma | |
Made roster † Pro Football Hall of Fame * Made at least one Pro Bowl during career

== Personnel ==
=== Staff/Coaches ===
1972 Buffalo Bills staff
| Front office: President – Ralph Wilson; Vice President and General Manager – Bob Lustig; Vice President – Pat McGroder; Head coaches: Head coach – Lou Saban; Offensive coaches: Receivers – Bob Shaw; Offensive Line – Jim Ringo | Defensive coaches: Defensive Line – Stan Jones; Linebackers – Jim Dooley; Defensive Backfield – Bill Atkins; Special teams coaches: Special Teams – Ed Cavanaugh |

=== Roster ===
1972 Buffalo Bills roster
| Quarterbacks (QB): 10 Leo Hart; 16 Dennis Shaw; Running backs (RB): 34 Jim Braxton; 33 Randy Jackson; 30 Wayne Patrick; 32 O. J. Simpson; Wide receivers (WR): 81 Bob Chandler; 26 Linzy Cole; 28 Dwight Harrison; 40 J. D. Hill; Tight ends (TE): 37 Ted Koy; 80 Jan White | Offensive linemen (OL): 60 Bill Adams G; 54 Tom Beard C; 79 Paul Costa G/T; 78 Dave Foley T; 74 Donnie Green T; 53 John Matlock C; 67 Reggie McKenzie G; 66 Bob Penchion G; 68 Remi Prudhomme C; Defensive linemen (DL): 83 Bob Christiansen DT; 82 Al Cowlings DE; 72 Don Croft DT; 76 Mike McBath DE; 88 Steve Okoniewski DT; 77 Jerry Patton DT; 85 Walt Patulski DE; 87 Louis Ross DE | Linebackers (LB): 63 Dick Cunningham MLB; 57 Dale Farley OLB; 59 Paul Guidry OLB; 56 Ken Lee MLB; 50 Jeff Lyman OLB; 64 Andy Selfridge OLB; 58 Mike Stratton OLB; 86 Dave Washington OLB; Defensive backs (DB): 47 Leon Garror CB/S; 43 Tony Greene CB; 20 Robert James CB; 48 John Pitts SS; 21 John Saunders FS; 42 Maurice Tyler SS; 41 Alvin Wyatt FS; Special teams (ST): 11 Spike Jones P; 3 John Leypoldt K | Reserve: 52 Edgar Chandler LB (IR); -- Mike Clark K (IR); -- Irv Goode T (IR); 51 Bruce Jarvis C (IR); 55 Bill McKinley LB (IR); 61 Jim Reilly G (NF-Inj.); Rookies in italics |

- October 16 – Haven Moses (WR) was traded to Denver for Dwight Harrison (WR).

== Regular season ==
In his fourth NFL season, running back O. J. Simpson gained over 1,000 yards rushing for the first time. The 23–24 loss on October 22 was the closest margin of victory for the Dolphins in the NFL’s only perfect season.

=== Schedule ===
| Week | Date | Opponent | Result | Record | Venue | Recap |
|---|---|---|---|---|---|---|
| 1 | September 17 | **New York Jets** | **L** 24–41 | 0–1 | War Memorial Stadium | Recap |
| 2 | September 24 | San Francisco 49ers | **W** 27–20 | 1–1 | War Memorial Stadium | Recap |
| 3 | October 1 | **Baltimore Colts** | **L** 0–17 | 1–2 | War Memorial Stadium | Recap |
| 4 | October 8 | **New England Patriots** | **W** 38–14 | 2–2 | War Memorial Stadium | Recap |
| 5 | October 15 | at Oakland Raiders | **L** 16–28 | 2–3 | Oakland–Alameda County Coliseum | Recap |
| 6 | October 22 | at **Miami Dolphins** | **L** 23–24 | 2–4 | Orange Bowl | Recap |
| 7 | October 29 | Pittsburgh Steelers | **L** 21–38 | 2–5 | War Memorial Stadium | Recap |
| 8 | November 5 | **Miami Dolphins** | **L** 16–30 | 2–6 | War Memorial Stadium | Recap |
| 9 | November 12 | at **New York Jets** | **L** 3–41 | 2–7 | Shea Stadium | Recap |
| 10 | November 19 | at **New England Patriots** | **W** 27–24 | 3–7 | Schaefer Stadium | Recap |
| 11 | November 26 | at Cleveland Browns | **L** 10–27 | 3–8 | Cleveland Stadium | Recap |
| 12 | December 3 | at **Baltimore Colts** | **L** 7–35 | 3–9 | Memorial Stadium | Recap |
| 13 | December 10 | Detroit Lions | **T** 21–21 | 3–9–1 | War Memorial Stadium | Recap |
| 14 | December 17 | at Washington Redskins | **W** 24–17 | 4–9–1 | Robert F. Kennedy Memorial Stadium | Recap |
Note: Intra-division opponents are in **bold** text.

=== Season summary ===
==== Week 2: vs. San Francisco 49ers ====
Week Two: San Francisco 49ers (1–0) at Buffalo Bills (0–1)

| Quarter | 1 | 2 | 3 | 4 | Total |
|---|---|---|---|---|---|
| 49ers | 3 | 7 | 3 | 7 | **20** |
| Bills | 0 | 6 | 7 | 14 | **27** |

at War Memorial Stadium, Buffalo, New York

- Date: September 24
- Game time: 1:00 p.m. EST
- Game weather: 60 °F (15.6 °C); wind 12 miles per hour (19 km/h; 10 kn)

Game information

**First quarter**

- SF — Gossett 47-yard field goal. 49ers 3–0

**Second quarter**

- BUF — Leypoldt 32-yard field goal. 3–3
- BUF — Leypoldt 22-yard field goal. Bills 6–3
- SF — Kwalick 20-yard pass from Spurrier (Gossett kick). 49ers 10–6

**Third quarter**

- SF — Gossett 20-yard field goal. 49ers 13–6
- BUF — White 17-yard pass from Shaw (Leypoldt kick). 13–13

**Fourth quarter**

- SF — Schreiber 2-yard rush (Gossett kick). 49ers 20–13
- BUF — Braxton 2-yard rush (Leypoldt kick). 20–20
- BUF — Braxton 1 yard rush (Leypoldt kick). Bills 27–20

**Top passers**

- SF — Steve Spurrier, 10/25, 171 yards, TD, 2 INT
- BUF — Dennis Shaw, 8/20, 105 yards, TD, INT

**Top rushers**

- SF — Vic Washington, 9 rushes, 18 yards
- BUF — O. J. Simpson, 29 rushes, 138 yards

Top receivers

- SF — Gene Washington, 3 receptions, 89 yards
- BUF — J. D. Hill, 2 receptions, 33 yards

==== Week 13: vs Detroit Lions ====
Week Thirteen: Detroit Lions (7–5) at Buffalo Bills (3–9)

| Quarter | 1 | 2 | 3 | 4 | Total |
|---|---|---|---|---|---|
| Lions | 0 | 7 | 7 | 7 | **21** |
| Bills | 0 | 7 | 7 | 7 | **21** |

at War Memorial Stadium, Buffalo, New York

- Date: December 10
- Game time: 1:00 p.m. EST
- Game weather: 32 °F (0 °C), wind 11 miles per hour (18 km/h; 9.6 kn), wind chill 24 °F (−4.4 °C)
- Game attendance: 41,583

Game information

**First quarter**

- No scoring

**Second quarter**

- DET – Earl McCullouch 9-yard pass from Greg Landry (Errol Mann kick). Lions 7–0. Drive:
- BUF – J.D. Hill 58-yard pass from Dennis Shaw (John Leypoldt kick). Tie 7–7. Drive:

**Third quarter**

- BUF – Bob Chandler 39-yard pass from Dennis Shaw (John Leypoldt kick). Bills 14–7. Drive:
- DET – Nick Eddy 36-yard pass from Greg Landry (Errol Mann kick). Tie 14–14. Drive:

**Fourth quarter**

- BUF – Jan White 2-yard pass from Dennis Shaw (John Leypoldt kick). Bills 21–14. Drive:
- DET – Ron Jessie 37-yard pass from Greg Landry (Errol Mann kick). Tie 21–21. Drive:

Top passers

- DET – Greg Landry – 8/25, 150 yards, 3 TD
- BUF – Dennis Shaw – 18/32, 239 yards, 3 TD

Top rushers

- DET – Greg Landry – 9 rushes, 46 yards
- BUF – O.J. Simpson – 27 rushes, 116 yards

Top receivers

- DET – Ron Jessie – 2 receptions, 51 yards, TD
- BUF – J.D. Hill – 8 receptions, 129 yards, TD

=== Standings ===
AFC East
| | W | L | T | PCT | DIV | CONF | PF | PA | STK |
|---|---|---|---|---|---|---|---|---|---|
| Miami Dolphins | 14 | 0 | 0 | 1.000 | 8–0 | 11–0 | 385 | 171 | W14 |
| New York Jets | 7 | 7 | 0 | .500 | 6–2 | 6–5 | 367 | 324 | L2 |
| Baltimore Colts | 5 | 9 | 0 | .357 | 4–4 | 5–6 | 235 | 252 | L2 |
| Buffalo Bills | 4 | 9 | 1 | .321 | 2–6 | 2–9 | 257 | 377 | W1 |
| New England Patriots | 3 | 11 | 0 | .214 | 0–8 | 0–11 | 192 | 446 | L1 |
