= 1971 Denver Broncos season =

American football team season

- Owner: Gerald Phipps
- General manager: Lou Saban
- Head coach: Lou Saban (first 9 games, 2–6–1); Jerry Smith (last 5 games, 2–3)
- Home stadium: Mile High Stadium

Results
- Record: 4–9–1
- Division place: 4th AFC West
- Playoffs: Did not qualify

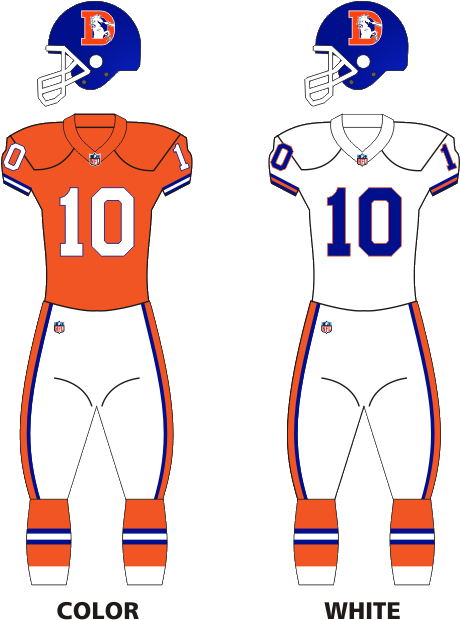
Uniforms of the Denver Broncos from 1968 to 1996

The 1971 Denver Broncos season was the team's twelfth season in professional football and second in the National Football League (NFL). Led by fifth-year head coach and general manager Lou Saban, the Broncos finished the season with four wins, nine losses, and one tie, again fourth in the AFC West. Fifth-year running back Floyd Little became the thirteenth in professional football history to rush for over 1,000 yards in a season; the future Hall of Famer ran for 1,133 yards, averaging four yards per carry.

On Wednesday, November 17, Saban stepped down as head coach but remained as general manager; offensive line coach Jerry Smith led the team for the final five games, with two wins. Several days after the season finale, Saban was hired as head coach of the Buffalo Bills, who had just one victory in 1971. The Bills improved to 9–5 in 1973 and made the playoffs in 1974.

In early January 1972, the Broncos hired John Ralston as head coach and general manager; he was previously the head coach for nine years at Stanford University, upset winners of the last two Rose Bowls.

== Offseason ==
=== NFL draft ===
1971 Denver Broncos draft
Round	Pick	Player	Position	College	Notes
1	12	Marv Montgomery	OT	USC	From Green Bay
2	35	Dwight Harrison	WR	Texas A&I	
4	79	Lyle Alzado *	DE	Yankton	
4	87	Cleo Johnson	DB	Alcorn A&M	
6	139	Harold Phillips	DB	Michigan State	
7	165	Doug Adams	LB	Ohio State	
8	187	Tom Beard	C	Michigan State	
9	217	John Handy	LB	Purdue	
10	243	Carlis Harris	WR	Idaho State	
11	269	Roger Roitsch	DT	Rice	
12	295	Floyd Franks	WR	Ole Miss	
13	321	Craig Blackford	QB	Evansville	
14	350	Tommy Lyons	C	Georgia	
15	373	Larry James	RB	Norfork State	
16	399	Steve Thompson	DT	Minnesota	
17	425	Jack Simcsak	K	Virginia Tech	
Made roster † Pro Football Hall of Fame * Made at least one Pro Bowl during career

== Personnel ==
=== Staff / Coaches ===
1971 Denver Broncos staff
Front office: Team Owner / Chairman of the Board – Gerald Phipps; Team President – Allan Phipps; Director of Player Personnel – Fred Gehrke; Director of Scouting – Carroll Hardy; Head coaches: General manager/head coach – Lou Saban; Offensive coaches: Offensive Backfield – Hunter Enis; Offensive Line – Jerry Smith (interim Head Coach)	Defensive coaches: Defensive Line – Stan Jones; Defensive Secondary – Joe Collier; Special teams coaches: Special Teams/Tight Ends – Whitey Dovell

=== Roster ===
1971 Denver Broncos roster
Quarterbacks (QB): 10 Steve Ramsey; 12 John Stofa; Running backs (RB): 11 Bobby Anderson; 33 Joe Dawkins; 44 Floyd Little; 22 Fran Lynch; 35 Clem Turner; Wide receivers (WR): 40 Jack Gehrke; 82 Dwight Harrison; 80 Jerry Simmons; 42 Billy Van Heusen P; Tight ends (TE): 81 Billy Masters; 85 John Mosier	Offensive linemen (OL): 56 Jay Bachman C; 74 Mike Current T; 67 George Goeddeke C/G; 68 Larron Jackson G; 61 Tommy Lyons G; 78 Marv Montgomery T; 64 Mike Schnitker G; 75 Roger Shoals T; Defensive linemen (DL): 77 Lyle Alzado DE; 79 Carter Campbell DE; 63 Dave Costa DT/DE; 76 Tom Domres DT; 62 Jerry Inman DT; 70 Paul Smith DT/DE	Linebackers (LB): 52 Fred Forsberg MLB; 58 Bill McKoy OLB; 54 Chip Myrtle OLB; 50 Olen Underwood OLB; 56 Dave Washington OLB; Defensive backs (DB): 24 Butch Byrd FS/CB; 28 Cornell Gordon SS; 20 Charlie Greer SS; 41 Leroy Mitchell CB; 21 Randy Montgomery CB; 26 George Saimes FS; 36 Bill Thompson CB; Special teams (ST): 15 Jim Turner K	Practice squad: 73 Walt Barnes DT; 60 Tom Beard C; 89 Gordon Bowdell WR; 88 Tom Buckman TE; 57 Bob Geddes LB; 8 Jack Simcsak K/P; 14 Bobby Stewart QB; Reserve: 72 Sam Brunelli G (IR); 53 Ken Criter LB (IR); 55 Pete Duranko DE (IR); -- Mckinney Evans CB (IR); 13 Don Horn QB (IR); 87 Rich Jackson DE (IR); 59 Larry Kaminski C (IR); Rookies in italics 41 active, 7 reserve, 7 practice squad

== Regular season ==
=== Schedule ===
Week	Date	Opponent	Result	Record	Venue	Attendance
1	September 19	Miami Dolphins	**T** 10–10	0–0–1	Mile High Stadium	51,228
2	September 26	at Green Bay Packers	**L** 13–34	0–1–1	Milwaukee County Stadium	47,957
3	October 3	**Kansas City Chiefs**	**L** 3–16	0–2–1	Mile High Stadium	51,200
4	October 10	**Oakland Raiders**	**L** 16–27	0–3–1	Mile High Stadium	51,200
5	October 17	**San Diego Chargers**	**W** 20–16	1–3–1	Mile High Stadium	51,200
6	October 24	at Cleveland Browns	**W** 27–0	2–3–1	Cleveland Stadium	75,674
7	October 31	at Philadelphia Eagles	**L** 16–17	2–4–1	Veterans Stadium	65,358
8	November 7	Detroit Lions	**L** 20–24	2–5–1	Mile High Stadium	51,200
9	November 14	Cincinnati Bengals	**L** 10–24	2–6–1	Mile High Stadium	51,200
10	November 21	at **Kansas City Chiefs**	**L** 10–28	2–7–1	Municipal Stadium	49,945
11	November 28	at Pittsburgh Steelers	**W** 22–10	3–7–1	Three Rivers Stadium	39,710
12	December 5	Chicago Bears	**W** 6–3	4–7–1	Mile High Stadium	51,200
13	December 12	at **San Diego Chargers**	**L** 17–45	4–8–1	San Diego Stadium	44,347
14	December 19	at **Oakland Raiders**	**L** 13–21	4–9–1	Oakland–Alameda County Coliseum	54,651
Note: Intra-division opponents are in **bold** text.

The sites of the two games with the Oakland Raiders were switched.

=== Standings ===
AFC West
	W	L	T	PCT	DIV	CONF	PF	PA	STK
Kansas City Chiefs	10	3	1	.769	4–1–1	8–2–1	302	208	W3
Oakland Raiders	8	4	2	.667	4–1–1	7–3–1	344	278	W1
San Diego Chargers	6	8	0	.429	2–4	4–7	311	341	L1
Denver Broncos	4	9	1	.308	1–5	3–6–1	203	275	L2

Note: Tie games were not officially counted in the standings until 1972.
