= List of Alcorn State Braves in the NFL draft =

This is a list of Alcorn State Braves football players in the NFL draft.

== Key ==
B	Back	K	Kicker	NT	Nose tackle
C	Center	LB	Linebacker	FB	Fullback
DB	Defensive back	P	Punter	HB	Halfback
DE	Defensive end	QB	Quarterback	WR	Wide receiver
DT	Defensive tackle	RB	Running back	G	Guard
E	End	T	Offensive tackle	TE	Tight end

== Selections ==
Year	Round	Pick	Player	Team	Position
1952	11	126	Jack Spinks	Pittsburgh Steelers	B
1965	19	253	Smith Reed	New York Giants	B
1967	10	249	Raymond Brown	New York Jets	DB
1968	6	149	Willie Banks	Washington Redskins	G
1968	16	409	Monk Williams	Cincinnati Bengals	DB
1969	9	215	Joe Owens	New Orleans Saints	LB
1969	11	276	Willie Peake	San Francisco 49ers	T
1969	11	278	Willie Norwood	San Diego Chargers	TE
1969	13	318	Joe Leasy	Boston Patriots	LB
1969	16	394	Dock Mosley	Pittsburgh Steelers	WR
1970	3	78	David Hadley	Kansas City Chiefs	DB
1970	8	192	Larry Estes	New Orleans Saints	DE
1970	9	219	David Washington	Denver Broncos	LB
1970	15	372	Marvin Weeks	Cincinnati Bengals	DB
1970	17	442	Rayford Jenkins	Kansas City Chiefs	DB
1971	3	76	Eddie Hackett	Minnesota Vikings	WR
1971	4	87	Cleo Johnson	Denver Broncos	DB
1971	6	134	Willie Alexander	Houston Oilers	DB
1971	9	212	Floyd Rice	Houston Oilers	LB
1971	12	292	Rich Sowells	New York Jets	DB
1971	12	307	Leroy Byars	Miami Dolphins	RB
1972	5	105	Leon Garror	Buffalo Bills	DB
1972	5	108	Bob Penchion	Buffalo Bills	G
1972	5	130	Harry Gooden	San Diego Chargers	DE
1972	13	336	Franklin Roberts	Minnesota Vikings	RB
1973	3	73	Charles Davis	New England Patriots	RB
1973	5	123	Willis McGee	San Diego Chargers	WR
1973	13	328	Clifton Davis	New York Giants	RB
1974	2	39	Billy Howard	Detroit Lions	DT
1974	6	143	James Davis	Detroit Lions	G
1974	7	157	Leonard Fairley	Houston Oilers	DB
1974	12	301	Larry Cameron	Denver Broncos	LB
1974	17	432	Boyd Brown	Denver Broncos	TE
1975	16	410	Francis Reynolds	Los Angeles Rams	RB
1976	11	296	Lawrence Pillers	New York Jets	DE
1977	3	70	Jimmie Giles	Houston Oilers	TE
1978	9	237	Henry Bradley	San Diego Chargers	DT
1979	10	268	Larry Willis	Kansas City Chiefs	WR
1980	1	23	Roynell Young	Philadelphia Eagles	DB
1980	9	229	Otis Wonsley	New York Giants	RB
1985	2	30	Issiac Holt	Minnesota Vikings	DB
1986	11	281	Wayne Dillard	St. Louis Cardinals	LB
1987	5	123	Milton Mack	New Orleans Saints	DB
1989	5	120	Elliot Smith	San Diego Chargers	DB
1989	5	137	Michael Andrews	Buffalo Bills	DB
1989	9	227	Jack Phillips	Kansas City Chiefs	DB
1990	7	167	Dwayne White	New York Jets	G
1990	7	173	Garry Lewis	Oakland Raiders	DB
1992	5	138	Torrance Small	New Orleans Saints	WR
1992	11	305	Cedric Tillman	Denver Broncos	WR
1994	1	11	John Thierry	Chicago Bears	DE
1995	1	3	Steve McNair	Houston Oilers	QB
1998	2	38	Bryant Mix	Houston Oilers	DT
1999	7	213	Donald Driver	Green Bay Packers	WR
