= Don Horn =

American football player (born 1945)

No. 13
- Position: Quarterback

Personal information
- Born: March 9, 1945 (age 81); South Gate, California, U.S.
- Listed height: 6 ft 2 in (1.88 m)
- Listed weight: 195 lb (88 kg)

Career information
- High school: Gardena (Los Angeles, California)
- College: Washington State (1963); Los Angeles Harbor (1964); San Diego State (1965–1966)
- NFL draft: 1967: 1st round, 25th overall pick

Career history
- Green Bay Packers (1967–1970); Denver Broncos (1971–1972); Cleveland Browns (1973); San Diego Chargers (1974); Portland Thunder (1975)

Awards and highlights
- Super Bowl champion (II); NFL champion (1967)

Career NFL statistics
- Passing attempts: 465
- Passing completions: 232
- Completion percentage: 49.9%
- TD–INT: 20–36
- Passing yards: 3,369
- Passer rating: 55.9
- Stats at Pro Football Reference

Donald Glenn Horn (born March 9, 1945) is an American former professional football player who was a quarterback for eight seasons in the National Football League (NFL) with the Green Bay Packers, Denver Broncos, Cleveland Browns, and San Diego Chargers. He played college football for the San Diego State Aztecs.

== Early life ==
Born in South Gate, California, Horn graduated from Gardena High School in Los Angeles in 1963, where he starred in football and baseball for the Mohicans.

He briefly attended Washington State University in Pullman and captained the freshman team, then played college football at Harbor Junior College in Los Angeles. Horn transferred to San Diego State College and played under head coach Don Coryell. SDSC was then in the college division of the NCAA, today's Division II, and Horn was an All-American. As a senior, he threw to future NFL receiver Haven Moses, a teammate at Harbor JC.

== Playing career ==
=== Green Bay Packers ===
Horn was a first-round selection in the 1967 NFL/AFL draft, 25th overall, taken by the defending Super Bowl champion Green Bay Packers.

He served as Bart Starr's back-up in Green Bay for four seasons, although he was in the U.S. Army in 1968 and wasn't activated until hours before the season finale in mid-December. Horn relieved injured back-up Zeke Bratkowski in the first quarter and guided the Packers to a one-point win over the Chicago Bears at Wrigley Field, which denied them the division title.

Horn's greatest game as a professional came in 1969 at Lambeau Field. Playing at home in the season finale on December 21 against the St. Louis Cardinals, he completed 22 of 31 passes for 410 yards, with five touchdown passes and one interception. He started five games in 1969, leading the Packers to a 4–1 record and throwing for 1,500 yards, 11 touchdowns and 11 interceptions. Green Bay finished at 8–6, third place in the Central division, four games behind the Minnesota Vikings (12–2), who clinched the division title.

=== Later career ===
Horn was traded from the Packers to the Denver Broncos for Alden Roche on January 28, 1971, in a transaction that also included a swap of 1971 first-round picks; the Packers selected John Brockington at 9th, the Broncos Marv Montgomery at 12th. Horn started nine games (2–6–1) for a 4–9–1 Denver team in 1971, throwing 3 touchdowns against 14 interceptions. After two seasons in Denver under three head coaches, he spent a season each in Cleveland and San Diego.

Horn finished his pro career in 1975 with the Portland Thunder of the soon-defunct World Football League (WFL), where he completed 158 of 272 passes for 1742 yards and 11 TDs and 12 picks. Primarily a reserve as a professional, Horn passed for 3,369 yards and 20 touchdowns in eight NFL seasons.

== After football ==
After his playing career ended, Horn entered the real estate business in Colorado.

During a conversation in 2008, Horn talked about the excitement he felt when he was selected by the Green Bay Packers as their first round draft choice with a contract for $15,000 in 1967. As he stated, "that was over $1,000 a month, something today's players wouldn't even cross the street for."

Packer head coach Vince Lombardi told his players that he was aware "three or four of you are here for the money and are sorry souls." Horn responded that the opposite is true today, that only "three or four are playing now for the love of the game."
