= Marv Bateman =

American football player (born 1950)

No. 81, 7
- Position: Punter

Personal information
- Born: April 5, 1950 (age 76); Salt Lake City, Utah, U.S.
- Listed height: 6 ft 4 in (1.93 m)
- Listed weight: 213 lb (97 kg)

Career information
- High school: Highland (Salt Lake City)
- College: Utah (1969-1971)
- NFL draft: 1972: 3rd round, 78th overall pick

Career history
- Dallas Cowboys (1972–1974); Buffalo Bills (1974–1977); San Francisco 49ers (1979)*; St. Louis Cardinals (1980)*
- * Offseason or practice squad member only

Awards and highlights
- 2× First-team All-American (1970, 1971); 2× All-WAC (1970, 1971); NFL All-Rookie Team (1972)

Career NFL statistics
- Punts: 401
- Punt yards: 16,394
- Longest punt: 78
- Stats at Pro Football Reference

Marvin Fredrick Bateman (born April 5, 1950) is an American former professional football player who was a punter in the National Football League (NFL) for the Dallas Cowboys and Buffalo Bills. He played college football for the Utah Utes.

== Early life ==
Bateman attended Highland High School, where he competed in football, basketball and baseball. He accepted a football scholarship from the University of Utah. He led the nation in punting in his last 2 years and became the first Utah football player to receive first-team All-American honors two years in a row.

As a senior, he set school records for average yards per punt (48.07) and total punt yardage (3,269). During his college career he was also the team's placekicker, making 21 field goals (sixth in school history), converting 51 percent of his attempts and had a school record 59 yard field goal.

In 1987, he was inducted into the Utah Sports Hall of Fame. In 2004, he was inducted into the University of Utah Crimson Club Hall of Fame.

== Professional career ==
=== Dallas Cowboys ===
Bateman was selected by the Dallas Cowboys in the third round (78th overall) of the 1972 NFL draft. He became the starter, after the team traded Pro Bowl punter Ron Widby to the Green Bay Packers along with cornerback Ike Thomas, in exchange for a 1973 second round draft choice (#46-Golden Richards).

As a rookie, his progress was slowed by a sprained ankle he suffered in the second game of the season. He averaged a disappointing 38.2 yards per punt, but still received NFL All-Rookie honors.

In 1973, he improved his average to 41.6 yards per punt. He missed one game after suffering a collision against the Washington Redskins. He was the backup placekicker and made an extra point in his only attempt.

On October 30, 1974, he was released because of poor performances and replaced with Duane Carrell.

=== Buffalo Bills ===
On November 13, 1974, the Buffalo Bills signed him as a free agent to replace Spike Jones. He led the NFL two years in a row in net yards per punt.

In 1976, he led the NFL in punting average (42.8 yards), but his net average was only 28.7 yards, although he had a 78-yard punt, which still stands as the longest punt in team history. On August 24, 1978, he was released after walking out of camp because of a contract dispute.

=== San Francisco 49ers ===
On May 3, 1979, he signed with the San Francisco 49ers. He was released on August 14.

=== St. Louis Cardinals ===
On July 16, 1980, he signed with the St. Louis Cardinals. He was released on August 26.

== NFL career statistics ==
Legend
	Led the league
**Bold**	Career high

=== Regular season ===
Year	Team	Punting									
Year	Team	GP	Punts	Yds	Net Yds	Lng	Avg	Net Avg	Blk	Ins20	TB
1972	DAL	**14**	51	1,949	1,848	61	38.2	**36.2**	0	-	3
1973	DAL	13	55	2,290	2,003	62	41.6	35.1	**2**	-	7
1974	DAL	7	33	1,218	1,030	55	36.9	31.2	0	-	4
1974	BUF	5	34	1,494	1,210	66	43.9	35.6	0	-	6
1975	BUF	**14**	61	2,536	2,137	74	41.6	33.9	**2**	-	11
1976	BUF	**14**	**86**	**3,678**	**2,520**	**78**	**42.8**	29.0	1	**16**	**14**
1977	BUF	**14**	81	3,229	2,425	75	39.9	29.2	**2**	14	10
Career		81	401	16,394	13,173	78	40.9	32.3	7	30	55

=== Playoffs ===
Year	Team	Punting									
Year	Team	GP	Punts	Yds	Net Yds	Lng	Avg	Net Avg	Blk	Ins20	TB
1972	DAL	**2**	**12**	**515**	-	**59**	42.9	-	0	-	0
1973	DAL	**2**	11	485	-	55	**44.1**	-	0	-	0
1974	BUF	1	5	197	-	47	39.4	-	0	-	0
Career		5	28	1,197	-	59	42.8	-	0	-	0
