= Larry Willis (disambiguation) =

Larry Willis may refer to:

- Larry Willis (born 1942), American jazz pianist and composer
- Larry Ray Willis (born 1963), American-born Canadian and Arena Football League player
- Larry Willis (American football) (born 1948), American football safety
