= Jim Braxton =

American football player (1949–1986)

- Braxton during his collegiate career at West Virginia

No. 34
- Position: Fullback

Personal information
- Born: May 23, 1949; Vanderbilt, Pennsylvania, U.S.
- Died: July 28, 1986 (aged 37); Buffalo, New York, U.S.
- Listed height: 6 ft 1 in (1.85 m)
- Listed weight: 243 lb (110 kg)

Career information
- High school: Connellsville (PA)
- College: West Virginia
- NFL draft: 1971: 3rd round, 57th overall pick

Career history
- Buffalo Bills (1971–1978); Miami Dolphins (1978)

Awards and highlights
- First-team All-American (1970); First-team All-East (1970)

Career NFL statistics
- Rushing attempts: 741
- Rushing yards: 2,890
- Rushing touchdowns: 25
- Receptions: 144
- Receiving yards: 1,473
- Receiving touchdowns: 6
- Stats at Pro Football Reference

James "Bubby" Robert Braxton (May 23, 1949 – July 28, 1986) was an American professional football fullback in the National Football League (NFL) for the Buffalo Bills and Miami Dolphins.

== College career ==
Jim Braxton started playing college football at West Virginia University in 1967 and was the team's second leading rusher (272 yards) in his sophomore season in 1968. In his junior season, he rushed for a team best 843 yards and helped the team become Peach Bowl champions. He also was talented as a kicker. As a senior, he converted to tight end, catching 27 passes for 565 yards and eight touchdowns and that was good enough for first-team All-American honors.

== Professional career ==
Drafted in the third round by the Buffalo Bills in the 1971 NFL draft, he was needed not as the leading rusher, but the blocking weapon for star running back O. J. Simpson. As Simpson remarks, most of his 11,236 career rushing yards were due to Braxton.

Braxton's career took off in 1972, his sophomore season in the league, when he rushed for 453 yards on 116 attempts with five touchdowns and caught 24 receptions for 232 yards and a score. In 1973, Braxton rushed for 494 yards on 108 attempts with four touchdowns despite only playing in six games (starting four) due to being deactivated for the first eight games with a back injury. In 1974, Braxton became a premier runner alongside Simpson, rushing for 543 yards on 146 carries with four touchdowns.

During the 1975 season, Braxton rushed for 823 yards and nine touchdowns, which he considered his best season. He also caught 26 passes for 282 yards and 4 touchdowns. His nine rushing touchdowns ranked eighth in the league, and his 13 all-purpose scores finished fifth.

Braxton's 1976 season ended with a knee injury, and he rushed for 372 yards and a touchdown during the 1977 season. He played half of the 1978 season with the Bills, rushing for 73 yards, and then finished out his NFL career in the second half of the 1978 season with the Miami Dolphins, rushing for 48 yards and two touchdowns.

For his career, Braxton rushed for 2,890 yards on 741 attempts with 25 touchdowns. His receiving totals were 1,473 yards on 144 receptions with 6 touchdowns, for 31 career all-purpose touchdowns.

Upon Braxton's death, Ed Abramoski, Buffalo's lead athletic trainer during the entirety of Braxton's tenure, said "Jimmy Braxton was one of the smartest players I've ever seen. He really knew how the game worked."

== NFL career statistics ==
Legend
**Bold**	Career high

=== Regular season ===
Year	Team	Games		Rushing					Receiving				
Year	Team	GP	GS	Att	Yds	Avg	Lng	TD	Rec	Yds	Avg	Lng	TD
1971	BUF	13	0	21	84	4.0	14	0	18	141	7.8	25	0
1972	BUF	**14**	13	116	453	3.9	21	5	24	232	9.7	25	1
1973	BUF	6	4	108	494	**4.6**	**36**	4	6	101	**16.8**	**37**	0
1974	BUF	12	11	146	543	3.7	21	4	18	171	9.5	15	0
1975	BUF	**14**	**14**	**186**	**823**	4.4	29	**9**	26	282	10.8	32	**4**
1976	BUF	1	1	1	0	0.0	0	0	0	0	0.0	0	0
1977	BUF	**14**	**14**	113	372	3.3	12	1	**43**	**461**	10.7	27	1
1978	BUF	6	5	30	73	2.4	5	0	5	38	7.6	12	0
1978	MIA	10	2	20	48	2.4	15	2	4	47	11.8	19	0
		90	64	741	2,890	3.9	36	25	144	1,473	10.2	37	6

=== Playoffs ===
Year	Team	Games		Rushing					Receiving				
Year	Team	GP	GS	Att	Yds	Avg	Lng	TD	Rec	Yds	Avg	Lng	TD
1974	BUF	**1**	**1**	**5**	**48**	**9.6**	**30**	0	**1**	**8**	**8.0**	**8**	0
1978	MIA	**1**	0	0	0	0.0	0	0	0	0	0.0	0	0
		2	1	5	48	9.6	30	0	1	8	8.0	8	0

== Personal ==
While Braxton and his eventual wife, Pam, were dating in college, she became pregnant, and the couple decided it was best they gave their child up for adoption. In 1997, Pam met their biological daughter, who was then a professor at Southern Illinois University.

Jim Braxton died on July 28, 1986, due to lung cancer, at the age of 37. He died at Roswell Park Comprehensive Cancer Center in Buffalo, New York where he was undergoing treatment. He is survived by his wife, Pam, and two sons. His nephew, Landon Turner, played offensive lineman for the North Carolina Tar Heels.

O. J. Simpson offered these goodbye words to Braxton: "I've lost a teammate; I've lost a dear friend. Bubby was my protector on the field, my companion off it. What he meant to my career is impossible to calculate, but I know many of the things I achieved wouldn't have been possible without him."
