= Lou Saban =

American football player and coach (1921–2009)

No. 66, 72, 20
- Positions: Center, linebacker, placekicker

Personal information
- Born: October 13, 1921; Brookfield, Illinois, U.S.
- Died: March 29, 2009 (aged 87); North Myrtle Beach, South Carolina, U.S.
- Listed height: 6 ft 0 in (1.83 m)
- Listed weight: 202 lb (92 kg)

Career information
- High school: Lyons Township (La Grange, Illinois)
- College: Indiana
- NFL draft: 1944: 10th round, 88th overall pick

Career history

Playing
- Cleveland Browns (1946–1949)

Coaching
- Case Tech (1950–1952) Head coach; Washington (1953) Assistant coach; Northwestern (1954) Assistant coach; Northwestern (1955) Head coach; Western Illinois (1957–1959) Head coach; Boston Patriots (1960–1961) Head coach; Buffalo Bills (1962–1965) Head coach; Maryland (1966) Head coach; Denver Broncos (1967–1971) Head coach; Buffalo Bills (1972–1976) Head coach; Miami (FL) (1977–1978) Head coach; Army (1979) Head coach; UCF (1983–1984) Head coach; Martin County HS (FL) (1987–1988) Assistant coach; South Fork HS (FL) (1988) Head coach; Georgetown HS (SC) (1989) Head coach; Middle Georgia Heat Wave (1990) Head coach; Peru State (1991) Head coach; Tampa Bay Storm (1992) Head coach; Milwaukee Mustangs (1994) Head coach; Alfred State (1994) Head coach; SUNY Canton (1995–2000) Head coach; Chowan (2001–2002) Head coach

Awards and highlights
- As player: 4× AAFC champion (1946–1949); 2× All-Pro (1948, 1949); As coach: 2× AFL champion (1964, 1965); 2× UPI AFL Coach of the Year (1964, 1965); AP AFL Coach of the Year (1965); Buffalo Bills Wall of Fame; IAAC champion (1958, 1959)

Career NFL statistics
- Games played: 52
- Games started: 9
- Interceptions: 13
- Stats at Pro Football Reference

Head coaching record
- Regular season: AFL/NFL: 95–99–7 (.490)
- Postseason: AFL/NFL: 2–2 (.500)
- Career: AFL/NFL: 97–101–7 (.490); College: 60–83–4 (.422); Junior college: 34–16 (.680)
- Coaching profile at Pro Football Reference
- Executive profile at Pro Football Reference

Louis Henry Saban (October 13, 1921 – March 29, 2009) was an American professional football player and coach. He played for Indiana University in college and as a professional for the Cleveland Browns of the All-America Football Conference (AAFC) between 1946 and 1949. Saban then began a long coaching career. After numerous jobs at the college level, he became the first coach of the Boston Patriots in the American Football League (AFL) in 1960. He joined the Buffalo Bills two years later, and led the team to consecutive AFL championships in 1964 and 1965. Saban was the first head coach to win multiple AFL championships, with only Hank Stram passing him. After serving briefly as head coach at the University of Maryland, he was hired as head coach of the Denver Broncos in 1967, where he remained for five years. Saban returned to the Bills—by then in the National Football League (NFL) following the AFL–NFL merger—from 1972 to 1976, reaching the playoffs once but failing to bring Buffalo another championship.

Following his departure from Buffalo, Saban returned to college coaching. He coached teams including the University of Miami, Army, University of Central Florida and Peru State College. He also coached at the high school level and for two Arena Football League teams. Saban switched jobs frequently and developed a reputation as an itinerant. At Central Florida, he was nicknamed Lou "two point two" Saban because he typically stayed in a coaching job for about 2.2 years. Saban initially dismissed this characterization, but came to accept it later in life. He held 21 coaching jobs during his 50-year career (lasting an average of 2.38 years for each job), which ended with a job at Chowan University in North Carolina between 2001 and 2002. Saban's combined record as a coach in the AFL and NFL was 95–99–7. His college football record was 94–99–4. Saban suffered from heart problems and had a fall in his home that required hospitalization in 2009. He died in March of that year.

== Playing career ==
=== High school and college ===
Saban was the son of immigrants from Croatia and grew up near La Grange, Illinois, a suburb of Chicago. His first job, at age nine, was as a caddy for Al Capone's brother Ralph at a Chicago golf course. He was the brother of John Saban. He attended Lyons Township High School and joined the school's football team. A runner and passer, he led his high school's athletic conference in scoring as a senior and was named an all-state and all-conference halfback.

Saban's high school coach was an Indiana University alumnus and convinced him to enroll there. Saban played for the Indiana Hoosiers football team starting in 1940. He was used as a quarterback in 1941, his sophomore year. He also played as a linebacker and a placekicker. Saban was named to the Associated Press All-Big Ten second team as a quarterback in 1942. He was the captain of Indiana's 1942 team and was selected as its most valuable player. Saban was also a standout shot putter, winning a Big Ten Conference competition at Illinois Institute of Technology in 1943 with a throw of 48 feet and 11 1/2 inches.

Later in 1943, Saban joined the U.S. Army as World War II intensified following the attack on Pearl Harbor. In 1944, he was selected to compete in the College All-Star Game, a now-defunct annual contest between the National Football League champion and a selection of the best college players from around the country. Saban, then stationed at Fort Benning in Georgia, was named the college team's second Most Valuable Player after quarterback Glenn Dobbs of the University of Tulsa. He kicked three extra points and played on the defensive line in the all-stars' 24–21 loss to the Chicago Bears. Saban played for Fort Benning's 1944 Third Infantry Cockades football team, while stationed there. He also studied Chinese for five months at the University of California and served in China and India as an Army interpreter.

=== Cleveland Browns ===
Saban was selected 88th overall in the 10th round of the 1944 NFL draft by Card-Pitt, a temporary merger between the Chicago Cardinals and Pittsburgh Steelers made necessary after the teams were gutted by players' military service. Saban, however, did not sign with Card-Pitt, and instead joined the Cleveland Browns, a team under formation in the new All-America Football Conference (AAFC) and coached by Paul Brown. Brown said Saban would be used exclusively on defense as a linebacker and as a kicker of extra points. Saban was one of the first arrivals at the Browns' training camp in Bowling Green, Ohio, having left China just three weeks before.

Despite Brown's intentions, Saban was used occasionally on the Browns' offense in 1946. He caught a 44-yard pass from quarterback Otto Graham in a September game against the Buffalo Bisons. He was mainly used as a linebacker, however, and had four interceptions as the Browns won the first AAFC championship. In the offseason, he worked for Browns owner Mickey McBride's Yellow Cab Company; many of his teammates spent the offseason either at college making up for time lost to the war or taking jobs to supplement their football incomes.

Saban was named the Browns' captain in 1946 after Jim Daniell, the first team captain, was arrested in a scuffle with Cleveland police and was kicked off the team at the end of the season. The following year, he filled in to kick extra points when the team's regular placekicker, Lou Groza, was injured. The Browns amassed a 12–1–1 regular-season record in 1947 and won the AAFC championship for the second time in a row.

Never having finished his degree at Indiana, Saban enrolled that summer at Baldwin Wallace University in Berea, Ohio. After the 1948 season, in which Cleveland won all of its games and a third championship, Saban was named to two news outlets' all-AAFC teams. Saban came into his own as a linebacker in 1948. "Saban has been regarded as the best in football at his position for two years", Brown said in November. "If anything, he's even better this year. He has improved on covering pass receivers." He was a unanimous all-AAFC selection in 1949, when the Browns won their fourth AAFC championship in a row. Saban announced his retirement before the championship game and said in December that he was seeking the head coaching job at the Case Institute of Technology in Cleveland before its merger with the Western Reserve University forming the Case Western Reserve University.

== Coaching career ==
=== College ===
Saban beat more than 50 applicants to win the head coaching job at Case in February 1950, thanks to what the university's president called his "unusually sound knowledge of football" and his "leadership qualities". Saban "possesses the sort of personality and character that is of great value in work with young men", the president said. Saban was 28 years old at the time, and the appointment made him one of the youngest college head coaches in the country. Saban borrowed coaching techniques from Brown, alongside his version of the T formation offense.

Saban's team finished the 1950 season with four wins and four losses. By 1951, he was already under consideration for coaching jobs at bigger schools, including Indiana University and Toledo University, where he was mentioned as a "dark horse" candidate to replace former Browns teammate Don Greenwood. His Case teams compiled a 10–14–1 record during his tenure as head coach from 1950 to 1952. Saban resigned in March 1953 to become an assistant at the University of Washington under head coach John Cherberg. He spent just one year at Washington before getting a job as an assistant coach at Northwestern University, saying he wanted to return to the Midwest.

In February 1955, Saban was promoted to head coach at Northwestern, succeeding Bob Voigts and becoming the youngest coach in the Big Ten Conference at 33 years old. Saban hired George Steinbrenner as one of his assistant coaches. Saban's tenure as coach of the Northwestern Wildcats football team, however, was brief and unsuccessful. Hampered by injuries, the team lost all of its games in 1955, and calls intensified for Saban's firing as the season wore on. In December, Saban and his entire staff were fired by new athletic director Stu Holcomb. Ara Parseghian was named as his replacement.

Saban moved on to a job as head coach at Western Illinois University in 1957, where he quickly built up a successful team. The Western Illinois Leathernecks finished with a record of 6–1–1 in 1958, followed by an undefeated 9–0 season in 1959, when Saban also served as an assistant under Otto Graham in the College All-Star Game. Having built up a 20–5–1 record over three seasons as coach, Saban drew interest from the professional ranks, and the Boston Patriots of the newly formed American Football League (AFL) hired him as head coach before the circuit's inaugural season in 1960.

=== Professional ===
Led by quarterback Butch Songin, Saban's Patriots posted a 5–9 record in their first season. The following April, Saban brought in quarterback Babe Parilli, who formerly played for the Browns and Green Bay Packers, as a backup in the AFL's biggest-ever trade at the time. Five games into the 1961 season, however, with the Patriots at 2–3, Saban was fired and replaced by assistant Mike Holovak. Patriots owner Billy Sullivan said the decision was made by a majority vote of the team's board of directors, who "just simply felt all the talent on our team had not been used and felt Mike was the man who would be able to use the talent we had to the extent that it is capable of performing."

In January 1962, Saban was named the coach of the Buffalo Bills, another AFL team, signing a one-year contract worth $20,000 ($213,000 in 2025 dollars). The Bills had a 7–6–1 record in Saban's first season and came in third in the AFL's eastern division behind the Houston Oilers and the Patriots. Cookie Gilchrist, a running back who signed with the Bills after nine years in the Canadian Football League, won most valuable player honors that year and recorded the AFL's first 1,000-yard rushing season. Saban also acquired Jack Kemp, a quarterback, from the San Diego Chargers, who had put him out on waivers while he recovered from a finger injury. Sportswriter Randy Schultz called it one of the biggest bargains in professional football history.

The Bills posted a 7–6–1 record again in 1963, but this time it was enough to tie with the Patriots for the best record in the eastern division. This set up the AFL's first-ever playoff game to decide which of the teams would win the division and compete in the championship. The Bills lost the game, 26–8.

Helped by Gilchrist's running and quarterback Kemp's passing, the Bills finished the 1964 season with a 12–2 record and won the AFL championship. The team won despite drama involving Gilchrist, who came into conflict with Saban frequently and asked to be traded on numerous occasions. The Bills released him on waivers in November 1964, but canceled the move when Gilchrist apologized. After the 1964 AFL championship win over the Chargers, Saban was named the league's coach of the year.

Gilchrist was traded to the Denver Broncos in February 1965, but the Bills continued to win, ending with a 10–3–1 record and winning the AFL championship for the second year in a row. In the 1965 AFL championship game against the Chargers, when offensive linemen Billy Shaw and Dave Behrman were injured, Saban inserted veteran Ernie Warlick opposite rookie Paul Costa in a double tight end formation, which helped the Bills win the game, 23–0. Saban was named coach of the year for the second time in a row, silencing critics who had said he was indecisive, did not use his players properly and was not a good play-caller. On January 2, 1966, Saban unexpectedly departed from the Bills for the University of Maryland. He said he was leaving because "there can be little left to conquer in professional football". Saban later stated that a variety of factors all came to play in deciding to leave, ranging from his satisfaction in having two great years to believing the Maryland job would be best for his family over the grind of pro football. His record at Buffalo was 36–17–3.

Saban, however, only stayed at Maryland for one season in which the team posted a 4–6 record. He returned to professional football as coach of the AFL's Denver Broncos in December 1966, signing a 10-year contract with an annual salary of $50,000 ($500,000 in 2025 dollars). When he joined, the Broncos had yet to have a winning season in seven years of existence. He replaced Ray Malavasi, an assistant who took over after Saban's former Browns teammate, Mac Speedie, resigned from the post after the first two games of the season.

Saban engineered a number of trades before the 1967 season. He brought Gilchrist to the team from Miami in a seven-player deal; Denver had sent Gilchrist to Miami the previous season. He also acquired quarterback Steve Tensi from the Chargers in August for first-round draft picks in 1968 and 1969. Denver won its first game, but proceeded to lose nine in a row and finish with a 3–11 record. The team improved only marginally in the ensuing years, posting losing records in 1968 and 1969. The AFL and National Football League completed their merger in 1970, but the Broncos continued to lose, posting a 5–8–1 record. Saban resigned after the Broncos got off to a 2–6–1 start in 1971. He said resigning was "my responsibility to the team" and what while the club made progress, "my only regret is that we have not been able to give Denver a championship". Saban's record as Denver's coach was 20–42–3. Although he was not successful in Denver, he was cited by team owner Gerald Phipps as bringing in the "basic organization that we have now--administrative, scouting, coaching, the whole thing." Saban became well known for his intensity and occasional temper tantrums. A much-watched clip of him bemoaning to Denver line coach Whitey Dovell that "They're killin' me out there, Whitey, they're killin' me!" introduced Saban to a wider audience when it was aired by NFL Films.

Saban was named head coach of the Bills for a second time in late 1971. When he arrived, Buffalo was coming off a 1–13 season, although the team had players including running back O. J. Simpson, who had run for 742 yards and five touchdowns that year. While the Bills had a 4–9–1 record, Simpson led the NFL in rushing yards in 1972. Under Saban, Simpson continued to improve in 1973, setting a single-game rushing record with 250 yards in the season opener against the New England Patriots. He surpassed the single-season rushing record later in the year with more than 2,000 yards. Before Saban's arrival, Simpson had never rushed for more than 742 yards in a season. Simpson credited Saban with helping him reach his potential. "He saved my career", Simpson said in 1973, when he was named the NFL's most valuable player. "He promised me he'd give me the football and give me an offensive line, and he sure kept his word." The Bills had a 9–5 record that year but came in second in the AFC East and missed the playoffs.

Buffalo finished the 1974 season with another 9–5 record and made the playoffs as the AFC's wildcard team. The Bills, however, lost their first playoff game against the Pittsburgh Steelers and were eliminated. Saban said after the game that the Steelers' offensive domination was the deciding factor. "I'm not sure how they did what they did against us, but they blew us out", he said. Buffalo went on to an 8–6 season in 1975, failing to make the playoffs. After the Bills got out to a 2–3 start in 1976, Saban resigned. He was reportedly angry about how Bills owner Ralph Wilson handled the re-signing of Simpson, who had demanded a trade at the beginning of the season. Saban was replaced by Jim Ringo, who he had hired as an assistant in 1972. Wilson held a grudge against Saban for the rest of his life after his second resignation, refusing to put Saban on the Bills' Wall of Fame because, in Wilson's words, "he quit on me twice!" Walt Patulski, the Bills' first overall draft pick in 1972, also held ill will toward Saban after Buffalo, believing that Saban tried to force his personality onto Patulski and that the effort effectively ruined his career; Patulski would never speak to Saban again after their respective times in Buffalo, despite multiple opportunities to do so. Prior to his resignation, in June 1976, the Erie County Republican Party sought to nominate Saban as their candidate for the 36th Congressional District, against Rep. John LaFalce.

=== Return to college ranks ===
Following his resignation from the Bills, Saban took a post as athletic director at the University of Cincinnati in November 1976. He resigned 19 days later, however, and took a job as the head coach at the University of Miami, reportedly for a $375,000 salary ($2,120,000 today). He had double-bypass heart surgery at the Cleveland Clinic in the summer of 1977, but recovered by the time Miami's season began later that year. When Saban came to Miami, the football team had won just five games in the previous two seasons.

Miami posted a 3–8 record in Saban's first year, but improved to 6–5 in 1978. Saban instituted an extensive recruiting network to rebuild Miami's program, and was named the school's athletic director in early 1978. One of his recruits was quarterback Jim Kelly, who starred at Miami and went on to a Pro Football Hall of Fame career with the Bills.

Despite Miami's improvement in 1978, Saban departed the school amid controversy. That April, three freshman Miami players attacked a 22-year-old Jewish man wearing a yarmulke who was walking to religious services on campus. They threw the man, who worked at a campus gathering place for UM's Jewish community, into Lake Osceola at the center of campus. When Saban returned to campus a few days later, he was unaware the man was Jewish and reportedly said "Getting thrown in the lake? Sounds like fun to me." Miami's Jewish community complained, and despite numerous apologies, Saban offered to resign mid-season. Saban was convinced to remain through the end of the season, however, before leaving to coach at Army.

By the time Saban joined Army, he had developed a reputation as an itinerant coach, a "notorious job-hopper" who was nevertheless respected for rebuilding teams in poor condition. Saban said he wanted to stay at Army "until they put me out to pasture". Saban stayed at Army for only one season. He said he was unhappy with the academy's unwillingness to invest more in its football program. "This is a desperate situation", he said near the end of the 1979 season. "To fight alone as a football staff is impossible." He resigned in July 1980 after leading Army to a 2–8–1 record the previous season.

Saban next worked for George Steinbrenner, first in 1980 as an executive at Steinbrenner's Tampa Bay Downs racetrack and the following year as president of the New York Yankees of Major League Baseball. He took the post as a favor to Steinbrenner, a close friend who had served on his coaching staff at Northwestern in 1955.

At the end of 1982, Saban left the Yankees to take a job as head football coach at the University of Central Florida (UCF), a Division II school that aspired to move its program to the top of the college ranks. He took over a team that had gone 0–10 in 1982 and led the Knights to a 5–6 record in 1983. He resigned midway through the 1984 season with UCF's record at 1–6. Saban, by then 63 years old, said he had a meeting with school officials and felt he "had no part in their plans for the future". At UCF, Saban was playfully referred to as Lou "two point two" Saban because his average tenure as a coach was 2.2 years. He was replaced by his assistant, Jerry Anderson.

Saban retired in 1985 to Hendersonville, North Carolina. He came out of retirement in 1986, however, to coach high school football in Stuart, Florida, serving as the defensive coordinator for the Martin County High School Fighting Tigers. He left after two seasons and was appointed head football coach at South Fork High School, a rival of Martin County that had a record of 1–9 the previous year. After just one season at South Fork, Saban resigned in March 1989 to take a job as head coach at Georgetown High School in Georgetown, South Carolina. Saban said he was there to have fun and enjoy life, and that his reputation as a coaching "nomad" bothered him. "I've had no chance but to continue on", he said.

Saban was hired in 1990 to coach the Middle Georgia Heat Wave, a semipro team in Macon, Georgia, but he left after just four games. Team officials said it was "not a firing", while Saban said there were differences in philosophy and it was "not a resignation." Saban next took a job in 1991 as head coach at Peru State College in Nebraska, compiling a 7–4 record. He resigned in January 1992 because of a new rule that required him to teach at the school, a responsibility he did not want to take on.

Saban next signed on as an assistant with the Tampa Bay Storm of the Arena Football League. Two years later, he was named as the coach of the arena league's expansion Milwaukee Mustangs but was fired after the team started 0–4. The team's general manager said he wanted to be competitive and thought the club "needed a change". Shortly after his firing, Saban signed on to help start a football program at Alfred State College, a two-year technology school southeast of Buffalo, but he quit again, to take on the SUNY Canton job. In 1995, Saban was named the first head football coach at SUNY Canton, a two-year college where he stayed for six seasons. His Canton team was an immediate success, posting a 7–0 record in 1995 and a 34–16 overall record during Saban's time as coach. The school named its football field after Saban in the late 1990s.

Saban's final job, which he took at 80 years old, was as head coach at Chowan University in Murfreesboro, North Carolina. He compiled a 2–13 record at Chowan between 2001 and 2002.

== Personal life ==
In his later years, Saban had heart problems and a fall in his home that required hospitalization. He died at his home in North Myrtle Beach, South Carolina, on March 29, 2009. He was married to his first wife, Lorraine, and had a son, Thomas, and 3 daughters, Patricia, Barbara, and Christine. Lorraine committed suicide at their home in Orchard Park, New York, in the summer of 1977 while readying to join Lou at his new job in Miami. He shared seven children with his second wife, Joyce but they did not have any children together.

Saban shares his last name with another famous football coach, Nick Saban. They were called "distant cousins" in a 2005 article where Lou comments on the younger Saban's success. Upon the death of Lou Saban, his widow, Joyce Saban, said the two men might have been second cousins. Lou Saban stated he is a cousin of Nick Saban. Like Lou Saban, Nick Saban is of Croatian descent.

== Legacy ==
Including his stops at both two- and four-year schools, Saban's overall collegiate coaching record was 94–99–4. Including playoffs, his professional football record stands at 97–101–7. Saban had periods of success as a player and as a coach at the college and professional levels, but his constant moves from job to job eventually came to define him. "I have been known as a peripatetic coach", he said in 1994. "The first time I was called that, I thought it was a dirty word. I looked it up in the dictionary and found it meant I moved around a lot." Saban was inducted into the Greater Buffalo Sports Hall of Fame in 1994 and, in a surprise move, was added to the Buffalo Bills Wall of Fame in 2015, which occurred after Ralph Wilson's death in 2014 and his estate selling the team to current owner Terry Pegula. In 2011, the Professional Football Researchers Association named Saban to the PRFA Hall of Very Good Class of 2011.

== Coaching tree ==
Assistants under Saban who became college or professional head coaches:

- Mike Holovak: New England Patriots (1961–1968), New York Jets (1976)
- Joe Collier: Buffalo Bills (1966–1968)
- Harvey Johnson: Buffalo Bills (1968, 1971)
- John Mazur: New England Patriots (1970–1972)
- Jerry Smith: Denver Broncos (1971)
- Dick MacPherson: Massachusetts Minutemen (1971–1977), Syracuse Orangemen (1981–1990), New England Patriots (1991–1992)
- Jim Ringo: Buffalo Bills (1976–1977)
- Sam Rutigliano: Cleveland Browns (1977–1984), Liberty Flames (1989–1999)
- Red Miller: Denver Broncos (1977–1980), Denver Gold (1983)

Additionally, Marty Schottenheimer, who played for Saban from 1965 to 1968 with the AFL's Bills, was influenced by Saban's coaching philosophy. Schottenheimer and the coaches he influenced are considered to be in Saban's coaching tree.

Lou Saban coaching tree

Lou Saban; Boston Patriots, 1961–61; Buffalo Bills, 1962–65; Denver Broncos, 1967–71; Buffalo Bills, 1972–76
Marty Schottenheimer; Cleveland Browns, 1984–88; Kansas City Chiefs, 1989–98; Washington Redskins, 2001; San Diego Chargers, 2002–06
Tony Dungy; Bucs, 1996–2001; Colts, 2002–08 | Herm Edwards; Jets, 2001–05; Chiefs, 2006–08 | Bill Cowher; Steelers, 1992–2006 | Mike McCarthy; Packers, 2006–18, Cowboys 2020–24
Lovie Smith; Bears, 2004–2012; Buccaneers, 2014–2015; Texans, 2022 | Rod Marinelli; Lions, 2006–08 | Mike Tomlin; Steelers, 2007–2025 | Marvin Lewis; Bengals, 2003–18 | Ken Whisenhunt; Cardinals, 2007–2012; Titans, 2014–2015 | Mike Mularkey; Bills, 2004–05; Jaguars, 2012; Titans, 2016–2017

== Head coaching record ==
=== College ===
| Year | Team | Overall | Conference | Standing | Bowl/playoffs |
|---|---|---|---|---|---|
Case Tech Rough Riders (Independent) (1950–1952)
| 1950 | Case Tech | 4–4 | | | |
| 1951 | Case Tech | 3–5–1 | | | |
| 1952 | Case Tech | 3–5 | | | |
| Case: | | 10–14–1 | | | |
Northwestern Wildcats (Big Ten Conference) (1955)
| 1955 | Northwestern | 0–8–1 | 0–6–1 | 10th | |
| Northwestern: | | 0–8–1 | 0–6–1 | | |
Western Illinois Leathernecks (Interstate Intercollegiate Athletic Conference) (1957–1959)
| 1957 | Western Illinois | 5–4 | 4–2 | T–2nd | |
| 1958 | Western Illinois | 6–1–1 | 5–1 | 1st | |
| 1959 | Western Illinois | 9–0 | 6–0 | 1st | |
| Western Illinois: | | 20–5–1 | 15–3 | | |
Maryland Terrapins (Atlantic Coast Conference) (1966)
| 1966 | Maryland | 4–6 | 3–3 | T–3rd | |
| Maryland: | | 4–6 | 3–3 | | |
Miami Hurricanes (NCAA Division I/I-A independent) (1977–1978)
| 1977 | Miami | 3–8 | | | |
| 1978 | Miami | 6–5 | | | |
| Miami: | | 9–13 | | | |
Army Cadets (NCAA Division I-A independent) (1979)
| 1979 | Army | 2–8–1 | | | |
| Army: | | 2–8–1 | | | |
UCF Knights (NCAA Division II independent) (1983–1984)
| 1983 | UCF | 5–6 | | | |
| 1984 | UCF | 1–6* | | | |
| UCF: | | 6–12 | | *Fired after 7 games | |
Peru State Bobcats (NAIA Division II independent) (1991)
| 1991 | Peru State | 7–4 | | | L NAIA Division II Semifinal |
| Peru State: | | 7–4 | | | |
Chowan Braves (Dixie Conference) (2001–2002)
| 2001 | Chowan | 2–3 (Note: Steven Lee served as Chowan's head coach for the first five games of the 2001 season before resigning. Saban was appointed interim head coach for the remainder of the year. Chowan finished the season with an overall record of 3–7 and a mark of 2–4 in conference play.) | 2–2 | 6th | |
| 2002 | Chowan | 0–10 | 0–6 | 7th | |
| Chowan: | | 2–13 | 2–8 | | |
| Total: | | 60–83–4 | | | |
National championship Conference title Conference division title or championship game berth

=== AFL/NFL ===
| Team | Year | Regular season | | | | | Postseason | | | |
| Team | Year | Won | Lost | Ties | Win % | Finish | Won | Lost | Win % | Result |
|---|---|---|---|---|---|---|---|---|---|---|
| BOS | 1960 | 5 | 9 | 0 | .357 | 4th in AFL East | – | – | – | |
| BOS | 1961 | 2 | 3 | - | .400 | Fired | – | – | – | |
| BUF | 1962 | 7 | 6 | 1 | .536 | 3rd in AFL East | – | – | – | |
| BUF | 1963 | 7 | 6 | 1 | .536 | T-1st in AFL East | 0 | 1 | .000 | Lost to Boston Patriots in Eastern Division playoff |
| BUF | 1964 | 12 | 2 | 0 | .857 | 1st in AFL East | 1 | 0 | 1.000 | Won AFL Championship |
| BUF | 1965 | 10 | 3 | 1 | .750 | 1st in AFL East | 1 | 0 | 1.000 | Won AFL Championship |
| DEN | 1967 | 3 | 11 | 0 | .214 | 4th in AFL West | – | – | – | |
| DEN | 1968 | 5 | 9 | 0 | .357 | 4th in AFL West | – | – | – | |
| DEN | 1969 | 5 | 8 | 1 | .393 | 4th in AFL West | – | – | – | |
| AFL total | | 56 | 57 | 4 | .496 | | 2 | 1 | .667 | 2 AFL titles, 2 AFL division championships |
| DEN | 1970 | 5 | 8 | 1 | .393 | 4th in AFC West | – | – | – | |
| DEN | 1971 | 2 | 6 | 1 | .278 | Resigned | – | – | – | |
| BUF | 1972 | 4 | 9 | 1 | .321 | 4th in AFC East | – | – | – | |
| BUF | 1973 | 9 | 5 | 0 | .643 | 2nd in AFC East | – | – | – | |
| BUF | 1974 | 9 | 5 | 0 | .643 | 2nd in AFC East | 0 | 1 | .000 | Lost to Pittsburgh Steelers in AFC Divisional Game |
| BUF | 1975 | 8 | 6 | 0 | .571 | 3rd in AFC East | – | – | – | |
| BUF | 1976 | 2 | 3 | 0 | .400 | Resigned | – | – | – | |
| NFL total | | 39 | 42 | 3 | .482 | | 0 | 1 | .000 | |
| Professional total | | 95 | 99 | 7 | .490 | | 2 | 2 | .500 | 2 AFL titles, 2 AFL/NFL division championships |

=== Junior college ===
| Year | Team | Overall | Conference | Standing | Bowl/playoffs |
|---|---|---|---|---|---|
Canton Northstars (NJCAA independent) (1995–1996)
| 1995 | Canton | 7–0 | | | |
| 1996 | Canton | 6–3 | | | |
Canton Northstars (Northeast Football Conference) (1997–2000)
| 1997 | Canton | 6–3 | 3–2 | T–2nd | |
| 1998 | Canton | 5–3 | 3–3 | T–3rd | |
| 1999 | Canton | 5–3 | 4–2 | T–1st | |
| 2000 | Canton | 5–4 | 1–4 | 6th | |
| Canton: | | 34–16 | 11–11 | | |
| Total: | | 34–16 | | | |
National championship Conference title Conference division title or championship game berth

== See also ==
- List of American Football League players
