= Don Calhoun =

American football player (1952–2020)

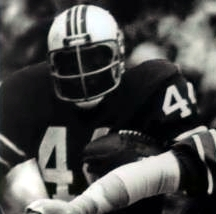
- Calhoun with the New England Patriots

No. 29, 44, 30
- Position: Running back

Personal information
- Born: April 29, 1952; Sumner, Oklahoma, U.S.
- Died: December 14, 2020 (aged 68); Derby, Kansas, U.S.
- Listed height: 6 ft 0 in (1.83 m)
- Listed weight: 206 lb (93 kg)

Career information
- High school: North (KS)
- College: Kansas State
- NFL draft: 1974: 10th round, 249th overall pick

Career history
- Buffalo Bills (1974–1975); New England Patriots (1975–1981); Philadelphia Eagles (1982); New Jersey Generals (1984)

Career NFL statistics
- Rushing attempts: 860
- Rushing yards: 3,559
- Rushing touchdowns: 23
- Stats at Pro Football Reference

Donald Clevester Calhoun (April 29, 1952 – December 14, 2020) was an American professional football running back who played for nine seasons in the National Football League (NFL) for the Buffalo Bills, New England Patriots. and Philadelphia Eagles. He later played for the New Jersey Generals of the United States Football League (USFL).

Prior to playing in the NFL, Calhoun played football at Wichita High School North and Kansas State University. He was selected in the tenth round of the 1974 NFL draft by Buffalo. In 2009, he was inducted into both the Wichita Sports Hall of Fame and the Kansas Sports Hall of Fame; and in 2010, was chosen and awarded entry into the Wichita North High School Hall of Fame.

In 1976, while playing for the New England Patriots, Calhoun led the NFL in rushing yards per attempt, with 5.6. He rushed for 721 yards that year.

He died on December 14, 2020, at age 68, in Derby, Kansas.

== NFL career statistics ==
Legend
	Led the league
**Bold**	Career high

=== Regular season ===
Year	Team	Games		Rushing					Receiving				
Year	Team	GP	GS	Att	Yds	Avg	Lng	TD	Rec	Yds	Avg	Lng	TD
1974	BUF	14	1	21	88	4.2	15	0	2	10	5.0	7	0
1975	BUF	6	0	19	80	4.2	11	0	0	0	0.0	0	0
1975	NWE	5	1	23	104	4.5	38	1	5	111	**22.2**	**62**	**1**
1976	NWE	14	3	129	721	**5.6**	54	1	12	56	4.7	12	0
1977	NWE	14	14	198	727	3.7	25	4	13	**152**	11.7	47	0
1978	NWE	14	2	76	391	5.1	**73**	1	3	29	9.7	15	0
1979	NWE	**16**	6	137	456	3.3	29	5	15	66	4.4	14	**1**
1980	NWE	**16**	**16**	**200**	**787**	3.9	22	**9**	**27**	129	4.8	12	0
1981	NWE	14	7	57	205	3.6	33	2	7	71	10.1	20	0
1982	PHI	1	0	0	0	0.0	0	0	0	0	0.0	0	0
		114	50	860	3,559	4.1	73	23	84	624	7.4	62	2

=== Playoffs ===
Year	Team	Games		Rushing					Receiving				
Year	Team	GP	GS	Att	Yds	Avg	Lng	TD	Rec	Yds	Avg	Lng	TD
1974	BUF	**1**	0	0	0	0.0	0	0	0	0	0.0	0	0
1976	NWE	**1**	0	**5**	**17**	**3.4**	**7**	0	0	0	0.0	0	0
		2	0	5	17	3.4	7	0	0	0	0.0	0	0
