= Nick Nighswander =

American football player (born 1952)

No. 65
- Position: Center

Personal information
- Born: November 3, 1952 (age 74)
- Listed height: 6 ft 0 in (1.83 m)
- Listed weight: 232 lb (105 kg)

Career information
- College: Morehead State
- NFL draft: 1974: undrafted

Career history
- Buffalo Bills (1974)
- Stats at Pro Football Reference

Nicholas M. Nighswander (born November 3, 1952) is an American former professional football player who was a center for the Buffalo Bills of the National Football League (NFL) in 1974. He played college football for the Morehead State Eagles.
