= Earl Edwards (American football) =

American gridiron football player (1946–2024)

No. 74, 73, 66
- Positions: Defensive tackle, Defensive end

Personal information
- Born: March 17, 1946; Statesboro, Georgia, U.S.
- Died: May 2, 2024 (aged 78)
- Listed height: 6 ft 7 in (2.01 m)
- Listed weight: 260 lb (118 kg)

Career information
- High school: Howard W. Blake (Tampa, Florida)
- College: Wichita State
- NFL draft: 1969: 5th round, 120th overall pick

Career history
- Edmonton Eskimos (1967–1968); San Francisco 49ers (1969–1972); Buffalo Bills (1973–1975); Cleveland Browns (1976–1978); Green Bay Packers (1979)

Career NFL statistics
- Fumble recoveries: 7
- Sacks: 51
- Stats at Pro Football Reference

Earl Edwards (March 17, 1946 – May 2, 2024) was an American professional football player in the National Football League (NFL) and Canadian Football League (CFL). He played at various positions including defensive tackle, offensive tackle and defensive end. Edwards died on May 2, 2024, at the age of 78.
