= Bob Penchion =

American football player (born 1949)

No. 69, 66, 67
- Position: Guard

Personal information
- Born: August 11, 1949 (age 77); Town Creek, Alabama, U.S.
- Listed height: 6 ft 5 in (1.96 m)
- Listed weight: 265 lb (120 kg)

Career information
- College: Alcorn State
- NFL draft: 1972: 5th round, 108th overall pick

Career history
- Buffalo Bills (1972–1973); San Francisco 49ers (1974–1975); Seattle Seahawks (1976)

Career NFL statistics
- Games played: 48
- Games started: 30
- Stats at Pro Football Reference

Robert Earl Penchion (born August 11, 1949) is an American former professional football player who was a guard for five seasons in the National Football League (NFL) seasons from 1972 to 1976. He played college football for the Alcorn A&M Braves (now Alcorn State). He played in the NFL for the Buffalo Bills, San Francisco 49ers and Seattle Seahawks.
