= J. D. Hill =

American football player (born 1948)

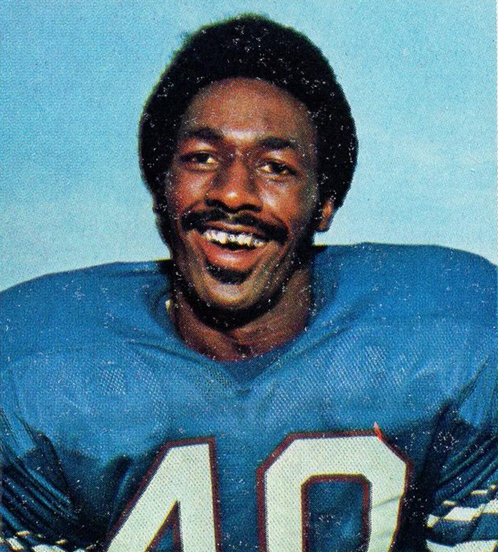

No. 40, 86
- Position: Wide receiver

Personal information
- Born: October 30, 1948 (age 78); Stockton, California, U.S.
- Listed height: 6 ft 1 in (1.85 m)
- Listed weight: 202 lb (92 kg)

Career information
- High school: Edison (Stockton)
- College: Arizona State
- NFL draft: 1971: 1st round, 4th overall pick

Career history
- Buffalo Bills (1971–1975); Detroit Lions (1976–1977)

Awards and highlights
- Pro Bowl (1972)

Career NFL statistics
- Receptions: 185
- Receiving yards: 2,880
- Receiving TDs: 21
- Stats at Pro Football Reference

James D. Hill (born October 30, 1948) is an American former professional football player who was a wide receiver for seven seasons in the National Football League (NFL) for the Buffalo Bills and Detroit Lions. He played college football for the Arizona State Sun Devils. He was the first wide receiver selected in the 1971 NFL draft at fourth overall in the first round by the Bills. His son, Lonzell Hill, also played wide receiver in the NFL. Another son, Shelby Hill, was a wide receiver for Syracuse University.

In 2014 Hill and seven other players were named as plaintiffs in a lawsuit against the NFL. It alleges he, and more than 400 others were illegally given narcotics to mask the pain so they could play in games. "I became addicted and turned to the streets after my career and was homeless. Never took a drug in my life, and I became a junkie in the NFL" he said.

== NFL career statistics ==
Legend
**Bold**	Career high

=== Regular season ===
Year	Team	Games		Receiving				
Year	Team	GP	GS	Rec	Yds	Avg	Lng	TD
1971	BUF	5	5	11	216	**19.6**	47	2
1972	BUF	**14**	**14**	**52**	**754**	14.5	58	5
1973	BUF	**14**	**14**	29	422	14.6	42	0
1974	BUF	**14**	**14**	32	572	17.9	55	6
1975	BUF	**14**	13	36	667	18.5	**77**	**7**
1976	DET	1	1	1	2	2.0	2	0
1977	DET	11	11	24	247	10.3	23	1
		73	72	185	2,880	15.6	77	21

=== Playoffs ===
Year	Team	Games		Receiving				
Year	Team	GP	GS	Rec	Yds	Avg	Lng	TD
1974	BUF	**1**	**1**	**4**	**59**	**14.8**	**20**	0
		1	1	4	59	14.8	20	0
