= Dwight Harrison =

American football player (born 1948)

No. 82, 25, 28
- Positions: Cornerback, wide receiver

Personal information
- Born: October 12, 1948; Beaumont, Texas, U.S.
- Died: September 2, 2024 (aged 75); Beaumont, Texas, U.S
- Listed height: 6 ft 1 in (1.85 m)
- Listed weight: 187 lb (85 kg)

Career information
- High school: Beaumont
- College: Texas A&I
- NFL draft: 1971: 2nd round, 35th overall pick

Career history
- Denver Broncos (1971–1972); Buffalo Bills (1972–1977); Baltimore Colts (1978–1979); Oakland Raiders (1980)

Career NFL statistics
- Interceptions: 19
- Fumble recoveries: 3
- Total TDs: 3
- Stats at Pro Football Reference

Dwight Webster Harrison (born October 12, 1948) is an American former professional football player who was a defensive back and wide receiver for 10 seasons in the National Football League (NFL) with the Denver Broncos, Buffalo Bills, Baltimore Colts, and Oakland Raiders.

Born and raised in Beaumont, Texas, he played college football for the Texas A&I Javelinas (now Texas A&M–Kingsville)

Harrison was selected in the second round of the 1971 NFL draft (35th overall) by the Denver Broncos. He was traded in mid-season in 1972 from Denver to Buffalo for wide receiver Haven Moses.

Harrison suffers from severe post-concussion syndrome, including severe depression, and was said to be living in a trailer in Texas without running water. His NFL pension had been cut off, and in August of this year, he was one of the plaintiffs in a concussion lawsuit against the NFL.

Harrison continues to fight for benefits NFL took away for the last 21 years.
