= Leon Garror =

American football player (1948–2017)

No. 47
- Position: Defensive back

Personal information
- Born: May 2, 1948; Mobile, Alabama, U.S.
- Died: June 16, 2017 (aged 69); Mobile, Alabama, U.S.
- Listed height: 6 ft 0 in (1.83 m)
- Listed weight: 180 lb (82 kg)

Career information
- High school: Williamson (Mobile)
- College: Alcorn A&M
- NFL draft: 1972: 5th round, 105th overall pick

Career history
- Buffalo Bills (1972–1973)
- Stats at Pro Football Reference

Leon Garror (May 2, 1948 – June 16, 2017) was an American football defensive back. He played for the Buffalo Bills from 1972 to 1973.

He died on June 16, 2017 in Mobile, Alabama, at the age of 69.
