= Gary Marangi =

American football player (born 1952)

No. 17
- Position: Quarterback

Personal information
- Born: July 29, 1952 (age 74); Rockville Centre, New York, U.S.
- Listed height: 6 ft 1 in (1.85 m)
- Listed weight: 201 lb (91 kg)

Career information
- High school: Elmont Memorial (Elmont, New York)
- College: Boston College
- NFL draft: 1974: 3rd round, 70th overall pick

Career history
- Buffalo Bills (1974–1977)

Career NFL statistics
- Passing attempts: 283
- Passing completions: 104
- Completion percentage: 36.7%
- TD–INT: 12–21
- Passing yards: 1,373
- Passer rating: 36.1
- Rushing yards: 328
- Rushing touchdowns: 2
- Stats at Pro Football Reference

Gary Angelo Marangi (born July 29, 1952) is an American former professional football player who was a quarterback for the Buffalo Bills of the National Football League (NFL). He played college football for the Boston College Eagles.

Marangi holds the record for the most pass attempts in a game by a player with a 0.0 passer rating, throwing the ball 30 times in a 13–34 loss to the San Diego Chargers on November 21, 1976. Overall, Marangi went 8–30 (26.7%) for 83 yards with no touchdowns and three interceptions.

== Boston College ==
Marangi played football at Boston College from 1971 to 1973. He completed 235 of 447 passes for 2,739 yards, 19 touchdowns, and 23 interceptions. Although Boston College was 20–13 during Marangi's tenure, including a 9–2 sophomore season, the Eagles never made it to a bowl game.

== Buffalo Bills ==
Marangi was selected by the Bills in the third round (70th pick overall) of the 1974 NFL draft. He was the backup quarterback in 1974, behind Joe Ferguson. He appeared in 3 games, completing 9 of 18 passes for 140 yards, 2 touchdowns and 3 interceptions. The first pass that Marangi ever threw in the NFL was a touchdown to JD Hill in a game against the Miami Dolphins, in 1974. In 1975, he appeared in 5 games, completing 13 of 33 passes for 235 yards, 3 touchdowns and 2 interceptions. In 1976, Joe Ferguson was leading all quarterbacks in most statistical categories going into the 7th game against the New England Patriots, Ferguson sustained a back injury and was sidelined for the season. Marangi replaced him and finished the season completing only 82 of 232 passes (35.3%) for 998 yards, 7 touchdowns and 16 interceptions. His 35.3 completion percentage is the worst all-time completion in a season (minimum 200 attempts). Marangi himself spent most of his time in Buffalo battling shoulder injuries, a factor in his consistently poor performance and early retirement.

== After football ==
Marangi is currently a Dean of Patchogue-Medford High School in Medford, New York., where he is currently the head football coach. Prior to that he was the quarterbacks coach at Connetquot High School also the offensive coordinator at Sachem High School East. In 2013, he was named the New York Jets Tri-State Area Coach of the Week after a 31-7 victory over Floyd.
