= Tom Beard =

American football player (born 1948)

No. 54
- Position: Center

Personal information
- Born: June 10, 1948 (age 78); Findlay, Ohio, U.S.
- Listed height: 6 ft 6 in (1.98 m)
- Listed weight: 280 lb (127 kg)

Career information
- High school: Battle Creek Central (Battle Creek, Michigan)
- College: Michigan State
- NFL draft: 1971: 8th round, 187th overall pick

Career history
- Denver Broncos (1971)*; Lansing All Stars (1971); Denver Broncos (1971); Buffalo Bills (1972)
- * Offseason or practice squad member only

Awards and highlights
- Second-team All-Big Ten (1970)

Career NFL statistics
- Games played: 12
- Stats at Pro Football Reference

Thomas LeRoy Beard Jr. (born June 10, 1948) is an American former professional football player who was a center for the Buffalo Bills of the National Football League (NFL) in 1972. He played college football for the Michigan State Spartans. He was selected by the Denver Broncos in the eighth round of the 1971 NFL draft, and also played for the Lansing All Stars of the Midwest Football League (MFL) in 1971.
