= Jim Ringo =

American football player and coach (1931–2007)

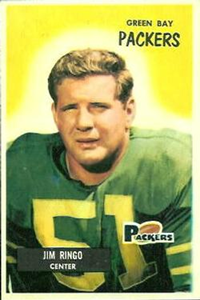
- Ringo on a 1955 Bowman football card

No. 51, 54
- Position: Center

Personal information
- Born: November 21, 1931; Orange, New Jersey, U.S.
- Died: November 19, 2007 (aged 75); Chesapeake, Virginia, U.S.
- Listed height: 6 ft 1 in (1.85 m)
- Listed weight: 232 lb (105 kg)

Career information
- High school: Phillipsburg (Phillipsburg, New Jersey)
- College: Syracuse (1949–1952)
- NFL draft: 1953: 7th round, 79th overall pick

Career history

Playing
- Green Bay Packers (1953–1963); Philadelphia Eagles (1964–1967)

Coaching
- Chicago Bears (1969–1971) Offensive line coach; Buffalo Bills (1972–1975) Offensive line coach; Buffalo Bills (1976–1977) Head coach; New England Patriots (1978) Offensive line coach; New England Patriots (1979–1981) Offensive coordinator; Los Angeles Rams (1982) Offensive line coach; New York Jets (1983–1984) Offensive line coach; Buffalo Bills (1985–1988) Offensive coordinator

Awards and highlights
- 2× NFL champion (1961, 1962); 7× First-team All-Pro (1957–1963); 2× Second-team All-Pro (1964, 1966); 10× Pro Bowl (1957–1965, 1967); NFL 1960s All-Decade Team; Green Bay Packers Hall of Fame; Philadelphia Eagles Hall of Fame

Career NFL statistics
- Games played: 187
- Games started: 186
- Fumble recoveries: 7
- Stats at Pro Football Reference

Head coaching record
- Regular season: 3–20–0 (.130)
- Coaching profile at Pro Football Reference
- Pro Football Hall of Fame

James Stephen Ringo (November 21, 1931 – November 19, 2007) was an American professional football player and coach in the National Football League (NFL). He played 15 years as a center for the Green Bay Packers and the Philadelphia Eagles, earning 10 Pro Bowl selections. At one time he held the record for most consecutive games played (182). He was inducted into the Pro Football Hall of Fame in 1981.

Ringo played college football for the Syracuse Orangemen (now Orange) and was selected in the seventh round of the 1953 NFL draft. A member of two NFL championship teams with Green Bay, Ringo was named to the NFL 1960s All-Decade Team, and was inducted into the Green Bay Packers Hall of Fame as well as the Philadelphia Eagles Hall of Fame.

== Early life ==
Ringo was born on November 21, 1931, in Orange, New Jersey, to James Sr. and Vera Ringo. The family moved to Harmony Township, New Jersey when he was three, and then a few years later to Phillipsburg, New Jersey, where he was raised. Ringo played high school football at Phillipsburg High School, and also was on the school's basketball and track teams.

He was a fullback, end and/or linebacker on the school's football teams before being made a center as a 15-year old junior. He continued to play linebacker on defense while playing center on offense, as a two-way player. Ringo considered his high school offensive line coach "Whiz" Reinhart, who had a mastery of line play fundamentals, the best coach he ever had; and essential to Ringo's future success in college and the NFL. In 1981, Reinhart gave the speech presenting Ringo for his induction into the Pro Football Hall of Fame.

As a junior in 1947, the football team had an 8–1 record. He was captain of the 1948 football team, and was named New Jersey All-State in football.

Phillipsburg High has subsequently given a scholarship and athletic grant in Ringo's name. In 1993, Phillipsburg's field house was renamed in his honor.

== College ==
Ringo attended Syracuse University, in Syracuse, New York, where he earned a marketing degree in 1953. He played center in college football at Syracuse, under College Football Hall of Fame head coach Ben Schwartzwalder. He chose to attend Syracuse because of Schwartzwalder's honest and direct character. The 1952 team had an 8–2 record, and played against the University of Alabama in the Orange Bowl. Alabama won the game easily, being led by future Green Bay Packer Hall of Fame quarterback Bart Starr. Ringo would be Starr's center on the Packers from 1956 to 1963 (winning two NFL championships together).

Some reports state he was an All-American in 1952 and others state he did not make any All-American teams while at Syracuse. High school football teammate Joe Szombathy was also his teammate at Syracuse.

== Professional career ==
=== Green Bay Packers ===
The Packers selected him 79th overall in the seventh round of the 1953 NFL draft. Ringo was considered vastly undersized at 211 pounds (96 kg). Ringo left training camp in his rookie year, returning to his wife Betty (Martin) Ringo and their new home in Easton, Pennsylvania, after facing a tough disciplinarian in Packers' coach Gene Ronzani; and doubting his own ability to make the team at 211 pounds. As Ringo later said, "'I thought I was too damn small to play in a big man's game'". However, Betty and Ringo's friends sent him back to training camp, where he made the 33-player squad.

Ringo began his rookie season well, starting in five games at center, but then suffered a knee injury that ended his season. After that, he was the Packers starter at center for the ensuing 10 years, missing only one start during that time.

Ringo played for five different head coaches in Green Bay. In his first six seasons, he played under Gene Ronzani (1953), Hugh Devore (1953), Lisle Blackbourn (1954–57), and Ray "Scooter" McLean (1953, 1958), and the Packers went 20–50–2 (.286). Vince Lombardi's arrival as head coach in January 1959 changed everything, and for Ringo's next five seasons, the Packers went 50–15–1 (.769) and 2–1 in championship games.

Ringo was individually successful before the Lombardi era. In 1957, he was selected to the Pro Bowl, and was named first-team All-Pro by the Associated Press (AP) and Newspaper Enterprise Association (NEA), and second-team All Pro by United Press International (UPI). This was his first of seven straight Pro Bowl appearances with the Packers. He was made the team's offensive captain before the 1957 season. In 1958, the AP, NEA and UPI all named him second-team All-Pro, behind the New York Giants Ray Wietecha.

In 1959, Lombardi led the Packers to their first winning season since 1947 (7–5). Ringo was again named first-team All-Pro by the AP, UPI, and NEA, as he would be from 1960 to 1963 with the Packers. The Packers were Western Division champions from 1960-62, losing the 1960 NFL Championship Game to the Philadelphia Eagles (17–13), but winning championships in 1961 (37–0) and 1962 (16–7) over the Giants. The Packers had an 11–2–1 record in 1963, but finished second in the Western Division to the 11–1–2 Chicago Bears, the eventual 1963 NFL champions.

Ringo's speed and mobility made him an ideal blocker for Lombardi's famous Packers sweep, and all but one of running back Jim Taylor's five 1,000-yard seasons—including his then-record 1,474-yard effort in 1962—came with Ringo at center. In 1974, he was inducted into the Green Bay Packers Hall of Fame. Lombardi said of Ringo, "'A bigger man might not be able to make the cut-off blocks on our sweeps the way Jim does. The reason Ringo’s the best in the league is because he's quick and he's smart. He runs the offensive line, calls the blocks and he knows what every lineman does on every play.'"

=== Philadelphia Eagles ===
On May 5, 1964, the Packers traded Ringo and fullback Earl Gros to the Philadelphia Eagles for second-year linebacker Lee Roy Caffey and a 1965 first-round draft pick, which was used to select halfback-punter Donny Anderson as a "future pick" in 1965 (7th overall), a year before he was eligible to play in the NFL. While Ringo's cut blocking technique and judgment in who to block on defense were key to Lombardi's power sweep running attack against a typical defensive front four, Lombardi eventually became concerned about Ringo's ability to block the larger tackles playing directly over center. On the other hand, Eagles coach Joe Kuharich said at the time of the trade, "'Ringo is one of the league's all-time great centers ... consider the Eagles lucky to have him.'"

Ringo played four years with the Eagles (1964-67), continuing to play at a high level even after the trade. He was named second-team All Pro by the AP and UPI in 1964 with the Eagles, and again in 1966 by the AP. He was named to the Pro Bowl three of his four years in Philadelphia (1964, 1965, 1967). One of Ringo's offensive linemates all four years on the Eagles was future Hall of Fame tackle Bob Brown, who was first- or second-team All-Pro from 1964 to 1967. The Eagles only had one winning season with Ringo, going 9–5 in 1966. Ringo enjoyed his years in Philadelphia, and liked the owner Jerry Wolman, but believed Wolman's financial difficulties kept the team from success.

In 1987, Ringo was a member of the inaugural class of the Philadelphia Eagles Hall of Fame.

=== The Lombardi-Ringo trade story ===
The details of Ringo's trade have been the subject of speculation, originating with Ringo's teammate Jerry Kramer. In his memoir, Kramer, who played guard next to Ringo from 1958 to 1963, recounted the story that following the 1963 season, Ringo showed up in Lombardi's office with an agent in tow and looking to negotiate a raise. Lombardi, according to this account, was so angered that he excused himself for five minutes only to return and announce that he had traded Ringo to the Eagles. Ringo himself has said this never happened, stating "'I didn't have an agent ... 'I really don't know how that story got going.'"

In reality, Lombardi had probably been negotiating a trade for some time. Ringo was shocked by the trade. It appears undisputed that Ringo had asked Lombardi for a substantial raise, in Lombardi's capacity as the Packers' general manager. Lombardi also was concerned, however, about Ringo's ability to play against large nose tackles, and that Ringo was nearing the end of his career. After the trade, in discussing the probability that 1963 Packers' tackle Bob Skoronski would become the 1964 Packers' center, Lombardi observed Skoronski was 20 pounds heavier than Ringo. Lombardi also said his philosophy in dealing with aging players was to trade them before hitting bottom. Secondly, Lombardi was also looking to bolster the Packers' defense through trades, which he felt was sagging in 1963, and that Caffey had been talented enough to start some games as a rookie in Philadelphia.

Also, as anticipated at the time of the trade, the Packers drafted University of Wisconsin center Ken Bowman in the 1964 NFL draft, who would become the Packers full-time starting center by 1965. Ironically, Bowman only weighed 230 pounds (104.3 kg), but would remain the starting center with the Packers until his 1973 retirement.

As to the other players involved in the trade, Caffey was a six-year starter at linebacker for the Packers, and a first-team All-Pro for the 1966 Packers team that won Super Bowl I. Caffey was inducted into the Packers Hall of Fame in 1986. Anderson had a number of productive years with the Packers, until he was traded because of a contract dispute. Gros averaged nearly five yards per carry for the Eagles in 1964, but was never as productive again during his remaining two years with the Eagles, before being traded.

== Legacy and honors ==
Despite his relatively small size for a lineman, listed at 6 ft 1 in (1.85) 232 lbs. (105 kg), though actually closer to 220 lbs. (99.8 kg) during his career, he used his outstanding quickness, speed, football intelligence and excellent technique to build a 15-year Hall of Fame NFL career. He played in 10 Pro Bowls and started 182 consecutive games. The 182 consecutive games was a record at the time. While with the Packers, he was the Western Division's starting center in the Pro Bowl seven times.

Hall of Fame coach Marv Levy said of Ringo's time with the Packers, "'In those days he was as well known as Bart Starr, Paul Hornung ... Offensive linemen don't really get that much notoriety, but he was exceptionally well known at the time. He was dominant and a key part of those Packer teams.'"

Ringo has received the following awards and honors, among others;

- Inducted Pro Football Hall of Fame (1981)
- Inducted into the Packers Hall of Fame (1974)
- Inducted into inaugural class of the Philadelphia Eagles Hall of Fame (1987)
- NFL All-Decade Team 1960s
- Packers 50th Anniversary Team (1969)
- Packers All-Modern Era Team (1976)
- Green Bay Press-Gazette All-Century Team (1999)

== Coaching ==
After retiring in 1967, Ringo went on to become an offensive line coach, offensive coordinator and head coach from 1969 to 1988.

=== Chicago Bears and Buffalo Bills ===
In February 1969, Chicago Bears coach Jim Dooley hired Ringo as an offensive line coach. He worked under Dooley from 1969 to 1971. Dooley was fired at the end of 1971. In February 1972, Buffalo Bills coach Lou Saban hired Ringo as his offensive line coach, and Dooley as his linebackers coach.

Ringo was key in assembling and then coaching the Bills offensive line known as the Electric Company, led by guards Reggie McKenzie and Hall of Famer Joe DeLamielleure. The Electric Company blocked for O.J. Simpson during his most productive years (1972-76), including his 2,003-rushing yard season in 1973, over a 14-game regular season schedule. As a team, Buffalo led the NFL in rushing in 1973 and 1975.

Ringo became the Bills interim head coach in 1976 when Saban resigned after five games, but the Bills lost their remaining nine games. Ringo served one more year as head coach in 1977, but Simpson was lost to injury for much of the season and the Bills finished 3–11. He was fired shortly after the season ended, and this would be his last job as a head coach, though he did later return to the Bills.

=== New England Patriots, Los Angeles Ram, and New York Jets ===
In 1978, Ringo was hired by the New England Patriots as their offensive line coach, adding the role of offensive coordinator from 1979 to 1981. In 1979, the 9–7 Patriots were second in the NFL in points scored and 8th in total offensive yardage. In 1980, they improved to 10–6, were second in the NFL again in points scored, and 7th in total rushing yardage. The Patriots fell to 2–14 in 1981, and the coaching staff was fired in late December. He next spent a year as offensive line coach for the Los Angeles Rams (1982), and then two years as the New York Jets offensive line coach (1983-84).

=== Return to Bills ===
He returned to the Bills in 1985 as offensive line coach and offensive coordinator, under head coach Kay Stephenson. Stephenson was fired during the 1986 season, and new head coach Marv Levy chose to keep Ringo on his staff. Levy personally respected Ringo as a player and coach, and knew other coaches who highly regarded Ringo as a coach. Ringo remained on Levy's staff for two more years before retiring in early 1989. Ted Marchibroda replaced Ringo as offensive coordinator. As a coach, Levy considered Ringo "a good teacher, he studied the game well. He tried to help players and they knew it. He was very highly respected and for good reason.'"

== Death ==
Ringo died of pneumonia on November 19, 2007, in Chesapeake, Virginia, after a short illness. He had suffered from Alzheimer’s disease since 1996. He was predeceased by his first wife Betty in 1987, and by his son Anthony. He was survived by his wife Judy, three children and six grandchildren. He is buried at Fairmount Cemetery in his hometown of Phillipsburg, New Jersey.

== Head coaching record ==
Team	Year	Regular season					Postseason			
Team	Year	Won	Lost	Ties	Win %	Finish	Won	Lost	Win %	Result
BUF	1976	0	9	0	.000	5th in AFC East	–	–	–	–
BUF	1977	3	11	0	.214	4th in AFC East	–	–	–	–
BUF Total		3	20	0	.130		–	–	–	–
NFL Total		3	20	0	.130		–	–	–	–
Total		3	20	0	.130		–	–	–	–
