= Dave Means =

American football player (born 1952)

No. 77
- Position: Defensive end

Personal information
- Born: January 23, 1952 (age 74); Hopkinsville, Kentucky, U.S.
- Listed height: 6 ft 4 in (1.93 m)
- Listed weight: 235 lb (107 kg)

Career information
- High school: Hopkinsville (Hopkinsville, Kentucky)
- College: Southeast Missouri State
- NFL draft: 1974: 12th round, 303rd overall pick

Career history
- Buffalo Bills (1974); Calgary Stampeders (1975)
- Stats at Pro Football Reference

David Mitchell Means (born January 23, 1952) is an American former professional football defensive end who played for the Buffalo Bills of the National Football League (NFL). He played college football at Southeast Missouri State University.

Means also played for the Calgary Stampeders of the Canadian Football League (CFL). He was inducted into the Southeast Missouri Athletics Hall of Fame in 2015.
