= Bill Adams (offensive lineman) =

No. 60
- Position: Guard

Personal information
- Born: February 4, 1950 (age 76); Lynn, Massachusetts, U.S.
- Listed height: 6 ft 2 in (1.88 m)
- Listed weight: 255 lb (116 kg)

Career information
- High school: Swampscott (Swampscott, Massachusetts)
- College: Holy Cross
- NFL draft: 1972: 7th round, 161st overall pick

Career history
- Buffalo Bills (1972–1978)

Career NFL statistics
- Games played: 46
- Games started: 1
- Stats at Pro Football Reference

William Joseph Adams (born February 4, 1950) is an American former professional football player who was a guard for six seasons with the Buffalo Bills of the National Football League (NFL). He later became a longtime high school football coach and athletic director in Massachusetts.

Adams played college football for the Holy Cross Crusaders, with whom he was a standout offensive guard. He was selected by the Miami Dolphins in the 1972 NFL draft but played his entire NFL career with the Buffalo Bills, where he was part of the famed “Electric Company” offensive line that blocked for O. J. Simpson during his 2,000-yard rushing season. After retiring from professional football, Adams worked for over 30 years in education and coaching, including nearly two decades as head coach at Lynnfield High School.

== Early life and college ==
Adams was born in Lynn, Massachusetts, and raised in nearby Swampscott. He attended Swampscott High School, where he starred as an offensive lineman under coach Stan Bondelevitch. Adams was named an All-Scholastic player and participated in the Agganis All-Star Game after his senior year.

He went on to play at the College of the Holy Cross, where he transitioned from linebacker to offensive guard. Adams was named first-team All-New England and received the Davitt Award as the Crusaders' top offensive lineman.

== Professional career ==
Adams was selected in the seventh round (161st overall) of the 1972 NFL draft by the Miami Dolphins, but was released before the season. He was signed by the Buffalo Bills shortly thereafter and remained with the team through the 1978 season.

Adams played in 46 career games, starting one. Though primarily a backup, he was part of the offensive line known as the "Electric Company," which helped O. J. Simpson rush for over 2,000 yards in 1973. He played behind All-Pro guards Joe DeLamielleure and Reggie McKenzie.

He retired from the NFL in 1979 at age 29, choosing to focus on family and life beyond football.

== Coaching and teaching career ==
Following his NFL career, Adams became a teacher and coach at Lynnfield High School in Massachusetts. He served as head football coach from the late 1980s to 2007, leading the team to several winning seasons, including a 9–1 record in 1991. He also coached basketball and served as the school’s athletic director beginning in 1994.

He was inducted into the Massachusetts High School Football Coaches Association Hall of Fame for his long-standing contributions to high school sports.

== Personal life ==
Adams continued working in education after his retirement from full-time teaching, serving as a substitute teacher and interim athletic director at nearby high schools. He resides in Massachusetts.

== NFL career statistics ==
Season	Team	Games played	Games started
1972	Buffalo Bills	6	0
1974	Buffalo Bills	8	0
1975	Buffalo Bills	6	0
1976	Buffalo Bills	11	1
1977	Buffalo Bills	9	0
1978	Buffalo Bills	6	0
Total	—	46	1
