= Gary Hayman =

American football player (1951–2020)

No. 21
- Positions: Running back, wide receiver

Personal information
- Born: September 8, 1951; Newark, Delaware, U.S.
- Died: October 1, 2020 (aged 69); Newcastle, Delaware, U.S.
- Listed height: 6 ft 1 in (1.85 m)
- Listed weight: 198 lb (90 kg)

Career information
- High school: Newark
- College: Penn State
- NFL draft: 1974: 5th round, 106th overall pick

Career history
- Buffalo Bills (1974–1975)

Career NFL statistics
- Rushing attempts: 17
- Rushing yards: 61
- Return yards: 408
- Stats at Pro Football Reference

Gary Wesley Hayman (September 8, 1951 – October 1, 2020) was an American professional football running back and wide receiver in the National Football League (NFL) who played for the Buffalo Bills. He played college football for the Penn State Nittany Lions.

== Football career ==
Speedster Hayman captained three sports at Newark High School (late 1960s) when Newark was 33–0 in football under Bob Hoffman. Hayman was the state's second leading scorer and an All-State selection his senior year. He starred in the Blue/Gold All-Star football game, catching seven passes for 202 yards and three touchdowns. Hayman, at Penn State University, led the country in 1973 in punt return average (19.2 yard average, on 23 returns for 442 yards). He averaged 19.7 yards every time he touched the ball. Against North Carolina State he had an 83-yard punt return. He led Penn State in receiving with 30 catches for 525 yards and three touchdowns. In kick-off returns, Hayman led the team with 237 yards on eight runbacks, averaging 29.6 yards, including a 98-yarder against the University of Maryland. Hayman caught three passes for 35 yards and set up the winning touchdown with a 36-yard return against LSU in the 1974 Orange Bowl. He also played in the 1973 Sugar Bowl. Penn State was 22–2 in Hayman's two seasons there. He shared 1974 "Delaware Athlete of the Year" award with Dallas Cowboy Randy White. Hayman was drafted in the fifth round of the 1974 NFL Draft by the Buffalo Bills. He broke his leg and was unable to play in 1974 and played in O. J. Simpson’s shadow in 1975. He was picked by Seattle in the expansion draft and later released.

== After ==
He was inducted into the Delaware Sports Museum and Hall of Fame in 1992.
