= John Leypoldt =

American football player (1946–1987)

No. 3
- Position: Kicker

Personal information
- Born: March 31, 1946; Washington, D.C., U.S.
- Died: February 7, 1987 (aged 40); Cheektowaga, New York, U.S.
- Listed height: 6 ft 2 in (1.88 m)
- Listed weight: 229 lb (104 kg)

Career information
- High school: Washington-Lee
- College: Northern Virginia
- NFL draft: 1971: undrafted

Career history
- Buffalo Bills (1971–1976); Seattle Seahawks (1976–1978); New Orleans Saints (1978)
- Stats at Pro Football Reference

John Howard Leypoldt (March 31, 1946 – February 7, 1987) was an American football placekicker who played eight seasons in the National Football League. He attended Washington-Lee High School in Arlington County, Virginia, graduating in 1965. Leypoldt died of a heart attack at St. Joseph Intercommunity Hospital in Cheektowaga, New York.
