= Dave Washington =

American football player (1948–2021)

No. 56, 86, 50, 52, 55
- Position: Linebacker

Personal information
- Born: September 12, 1948; Tuscaloosa, Alabama, U.S.
- Died: October 11, 2021 (aged 73)
- Listed height: 6 ft 5 in (1.96 m)
- Listed weight: 223 lb (101 kg)

Career information
- High school: Druid (Tuscaloosa)
- College: Alcorn State
- NFL draft: 1970: 9th round, 219th overall pick

Career history
- Denver Broncos (1970–1971); Buffalo Bills (1972–1974); San Francisco 49ers (1975–1977); Detroit Lions (1978–1979); New Orleans Saints (1980)

Awards and highlights
- Pro Bowl (1976)

Career NFL statistics
- Fumble recoveries: 15
- Interceptions: 6
- Defensive TDs: 2
- Stats at Pro Football Reference

Dave Washington Jr. (September 12, 1948 – October 11, 2021) was an American professional football player who was a linebacker for 11 seasons with five teams in the National Football League (NFL) from 1970 to 1980.

Washington played college football for the Alcorn State Braves and was selected in the ninth round of the 1970 NFL draft by the Denver Broncos. He was a one time Pro Bowler in 1976.
