= Larry Willis (gridiron football) =

American football player (born 1949)

No. 38, 33, 45
- Position: Safety

Personal information
- Born: July 18, 1949 (age 77); Phoenix, Arizona, U.S.
- Listed height: 5 ft 11 in (1.80 m)
- Listed weight: 171 lb (78 kg)

Career information
- High school: South Mountain (Phoenix)
- College: Texas-El Paso

Career history
- Washington Redskins (1973); Florida Blazers (1974); Montreal Alouettes (1975)*; San Antonio Wings (1975); Philadelphia Bell (1975); Montreal Alouettes (1976)
- * Offseason or practice squad member only

Career NFL statistics
- Games played: 1
- Stats at Pro Football Reference

Larry Lee Willis (born July 18, 1949) is an American former professional football player who was a safety in the National Football League (NFL) for the Washington Redskins. He played college football at Phoenix Junior College and for the UTEP Miners. He signed with the Montreal Alouettes of the Canadian Football League on May 18, 1976.
