= Reuben Gant =

American football player (born 1952)

No. 88
- Position: Tight end

Personal information
- Born: April 12, 1952 (age 74); Tulsa, Oklahoma, U.S.
- Listed height: 6 ft 4 in (1.93 m)
- Listed weight: 230 lb (104 kg)

Career information
- High school: Booker T. Washington (OK)
- College: Oklahoma State
- NFL draft: 1974: 1st round, 18th overall pick

Career history
- Buffalo Bills (1974–1980)

Career NFL statistics
- Receptions: 127
- Receiving yards: 1,850
- Touchdowns: 15
- Stats at Pro Football Reference

Reuben Charles Gant (born April 12, 1952) is an American former professional football player who was a tight end in the National Football League (NFL) for the Buffalo Bills. He played college football at Oklahoma State University. He is regarded as a draft "bust" as he never lived up to the billing after Buffalo used a first-round pick on him in the 1974 NFL Draft. His best season came in 1977 when he recorded 41 catches for 646 yards and a pair of touchdowns. He became the team's full-time starter at tight end the following season.

Following his playing career, he returned to his hometown of Tulsa, Oklahoma and spent a decade at the Greenwood Chamber of Commerce. He now serves as the executive director for the John Hope Franklin Center for Reconciliation.

Gant's career and life were profiled in a feature titled "Reuben Gant NFL and Community Champion" on KJRH's Positively Oklahoma during Black HIstory Month in 2025.

In 2026, he was inducted into the Tulsa Hall of Fame.
