= Tony Greene =

American football player (born 1949)

No. 43
- Position: Safety

Personal information
- Born: August 29, 1949 (age 77); Gaithersburg, Maryland, U.S.
- Listed height: 5 ft 10 in (1.78 m)
- Listed weight: 170 lb (77 kg)

Career information
- High school: Gaithersburg (Gaithersburg, Maryland)
- College: Maryland
- NFL draft: 1971: undrafted

Career history
- Buffalo Bills (1971–1979)

Awards and highlights
- First-team All-Pro (1974); Pro Bowl (1977)

Career NFL statistics
- Interceptions: 37
- INT yards: 628
- Touchdowns: 2
- Stats at Pro Football Reference

Anthony Jerome Greene (born August 29, 1949) is an American professional football former safety in the National Football League (NFL) who played for the Buffalo Bills. He played college football at the University of Maryland.

Greene holds the record for the longest interception return in Bills history, when he scored on a 101-yard interception against the Kansas City Chiefs in 1976.
