= Walt Patulski =

American football player (born 1950)

No. 85, 74
- Position: Defensive end

Personal information
- Born: February 3, 1950 (age 76); Fulton, New York, U.S.
- Listed height: 6 ft 6 in (1.98 m)
- Listed weight: 259 lb (117 kg)

Career information
- High school: Christian Brothers Academy (DeWitt, New York)
- College: Notre Dame
- NFL draft: 1972: 1st round, 1st overall pick

Career history
- Buffalo Bills (1972–1975); St. Louis Cardinals (1976–1977)

Awards and highlights
- Lombardi Award (1971); UPI Lineman of the Year (1971); Unanimous All-American (1971)

Career NFL statistics
- Games played: 70
- Sacks: 21.5
- Stats at Pro Football Reference

Walter George Patulski (born February 3, 1950) is an American former professional football player who was a defensive end in the National Football League (NFL). He played college football for the Notre Dame Fighting Irish.

== High school ==
Patulski was a star athlete at Christian Brothers Academy in Syracuse, New York, where he was a three-year letterman in football, basketball, and track and field. In his senior season in 1967, the 6-foot-5 fullback scored 140 points and led the Brothers to a 7–1 record. He was All-City in football and basketball. A High School All-American, he received over 60 scholarship offers to play football.

In 1991, Patulski was voted to the Greater Syracuse Sports Hall of Fame for his activities as a high school athlete.

== College career ==
At the University of Notre Dame, Patulski was converted into a defensive end. He was an All-American in 1971, and he won the 1971 Lombardi Award, which is given to college football's best lineman. A Fighting Irish captain, he finished ninth in that year's Heisman Trophy balloting. Selected the Nation's Lineman of the Year by UPI and Gridiron Magazine in 1971. Patulski was named to Football News sophomore All-America squad in 1969 and was an honorable mention All-American in 1970.

Patulski started every game in his collegiate career, and totaled 186 tackles, 40 for losses; broke up 10 passes; recovered five fumbles and returned one blocked punt 12 yards. In his final football season at Notre Dame, 1971, he was the team defensive MVP. Patulski made 74 tackles, 22 more than his total for the 1970 season. Seventeen of those stops resulted losses for the opposing team. Patulski also broke up six passes, recovered one fumble. The 1969-1971 Irish rushing defenses and total defenses were ranked in the nation's top six all three years and its scoring defense was in the top ten in 1970 and 1971 and compiled a record of 25–4–1 over those three seasons while Patulski was a starter.

Patulski was awarded the game ball for his performance in the Irish initial 1971 contest against Northwestern and was acclaimed as national lineman of the week following the North Carolina game. His play versus Michigan State prompted the head coach Duffy Dougherty to hail him as Notre Dame's "finest defender".

Patulski was later named to Notre Dame's All-Century team. He played in the 1971 Cotton Bowl Classic and the Hula Bowl. In the Hula Bowl he won the Defensive Lineman of the Game award. In the summer of 1972, Patulski played in the College All-Star game, in Chicago, Illinois. Patulski was lauded by one team as "(T)he best we've seen for many years." All but unstoppable on the pass rush, he dazzled the experts with his "amazing agility and lateral mobility."

== Professional career ==
Patulski was selected by the Buffalo Bills with the first overall pick of the 1972 NFL draft. He was the last Notre Dame player to be drafted #1 overall. His size and speed were among the reasons he was highly touted: At 6'6" and 250 pounds, he could run the 40 in 4.9 seconds.

As a rookie, Patulski led the Bills (coached by Lou Saban) with five sacks. In 1973, the Bills improved to a 9–5 record after going 4–9–1 in his rookie season of 1972, he recorded seven sacks, which was second on the team and was voted AP NFL Defensive Player of the Week (November 28, 1973), after Week 11. In 1974, the Bills recorded another 9–5 record and made the playoffs for the first time in eight years as he recorded 5.5 sacks. The Bills were 8-6 during his third season, but did not advance to the AFC playoffs. He recorded four sacks, a career low, however, two came in a game against the St. Louis Cardinals offensive line, who gave up only eight sacks in 1975. He lined up against St. Louis all-pro and Pro Football Hall of Fame offensive tackle Dan Dierdorf. Patulski played four years (1972–1975) with the Bills, and then he was traded to the Cardinals for a second-round draft pick (which they would use to draft Joe Devlin), and played one year with the St. Louis Cardinals (1977). He then suffered career-ending back surgery due to an injury he suffered while with the Chicago Bears.

The Bills considered Patulski expendable when they acquired Sherman White from the Cincinnati Bengals, who was selected second overall in the 1972 draft out of California.

== Personal ==
Patulski is a recipient of the Key to Syracuse (New York) for his distinguished community service. He also served as a sales manager of one of Syracuse's banks. He served for six years as Commissioner of the Syracuse Board of Education, and has also been a board member of the Boys and Girls Clubs of America. He has also recently been guest speaker at the National Football Foundation.

He was appointed and later elected as Commissioner of Education for the Syracuse School District in 1980. Of Polish descent, he was honored on June 19, 2014, with an induction into the National Polish-American Sports Hall of Fame in Troy, Michigan.

Patulski has two daughters, Wallis and Emily. Wallis is a graduate of George Washington University. Emily graduated from Boston University where she majored in psychology.

In September 2016, Bills coach Rex Ryan used Patulski's name as an alias when he posed as a reporter for The Buffalo News at a press conference for New England Patriots head coach Bill Belichick. The practical joke led the News to commission a guest column from the real Patulski following the Bills' win over the Patriots on October 2. The News then profiled Patulski a month later, explaining Patulski's quiet personality clashed with the style of Bills coach Lou Saban. Patulski never spoke to Saban again after his football career ended, despite the opportunities to do so.
