= 1972 NFL season =

American football season

Regular season
- Duration: September 17 – December 17, 1972

Playoffs
- Start date: December 23, 1972
- AFC Champions: Miami Dolphins
- NFC Champions: Washington Redskins

Super Bowl VII
- Date: January 14, 1973
- Site: Los Angeles Memorial Coliseum
- Champions: Miami Dolphins

Pro Bowl
- Date: January 21, 1973
- Site: Texas Stadium, Irving, Texas

AFC teams: West, Central, East
NFC teams: West, Central, East

The 1972 NFL season was the 53rd regular season of the National Football League. The Miami Dolphins became the first (and to date the only) NFL team to finish a championship season undefeated and untied when they beat the Washington Redskins 14-7 in Super Bowl VII. The Dolphins not only led the NFL in points scored, while their defense led the league in fewest points allowed, the roster also featured two running backs who gained 1,000 rushing yards in the same season.

== Colts and Rams exchange owners ==
On July 13, Robert Irsay and Willard Keland bought the Los Angeles Rams from the estate of Dan Reeves and transferred ownership to Carroll Rosenbloom, in exchange for ownership of the Baltimore Colts.

== Draft ==
The 1972 NFL draft was held from February 1 to 2, 1972, at New York City's Essex House. With the first pick, the Buffalo Bills selected defensive end Walt Patulski from the University of Notre Dame.

== New officials ==
Referee Jack Vest, the referee for Super Bowl II, the 1969 AFL championship game and 1971 AFC championship game, was killed in a June motorcycle accident in South Carolina at age 45. Chuck Heberling was promoted from line judge to fill the vacancy and kept Vest's crew intact. Heberling's line judge vacancy was filled by Red Cashion, who was promoted to referee in 1976 and worked in the league through 1996, earning assignment to Super Bowl XX and Super Bowl XXX.

== Major rule changes ==
- The inbounds lines or hashmarks were moved 10.75 ft (3.28 m) closer to the center of the field, to 70.75 ft (21.56 m) from the sidelines. Since the 1945 season, they had been 20 yd (18.29 m) from the sideline [40 ft (12.19 m) apart]. The hashmarks are now 18.5 ft (5.64 m) apart (the same width as the goalposts), cutting down on severe angles for short field goal attempts, and nearly eliminating the short-side fields for the offense.
  - With the hashmarks now the same width as the goalposts, a team punting from inside its 15-yard line had the option to snap the ball from the old hashmarks (spot to be determined by the referee, since the old hashmarks were not marked on the field) to avoid the punt hitting the goalpost.
- Field number markings were standardized across the league, both in size and position.
  - Prior to 1972, the Oakland Raiders' field numbers were inside a silver shield, and the Denver Broncos and San Diego Chargers used diamonds to mark numbers.
  - The fields for the Houston Oilers and New Orleans Saints had field numbers closer to the sidelines than most stadiums, since they were marked with both NFL and collegiate hashmarks.
  - Yard lines ending in "5" could not be marked. In 1971, the Buffalo Bills and New York Giants were the last teams to mark yard lines every five yards instead of ten.
- If a legal receiver goes out of bounds, either accidentally or forced out, and returns to touch or catch the pass in bounds, the penalty is a loss of down (but no penalty yardage will be assessed).
- If a punt or missed field goal crosses the receivers' goal line, a member of the receiving team may advance the ball into the field of play. Previously, the ball was dead when a scrimmage kick crossed the goal line and the receivers were awarded an automatic touchback.
- All fouls committed by the offensive team behind the line of scrimmage will be assessed from the previous spot.
- Tie games, previously ignored in computing of winning percentage, were made equal to a half-game win and a half-game loss.
- This was the first season third-down conversions were recorded as an official statistic.

== Deaths ==
- March 14 - Len Ford, age 46. Offensive end for the Los Angeles Dons, Cleveland Browns and Green Bay Packers. Inducted into the Pro Football Hall Of Fame in 1976.
- October 20 - Jim Duncan, age 26, Defensive back for the Baltimore Colts. Played for the Colts in the win over the Dallas Cowboys in Super Bowl V.
- December 22 - Jimmy Patton, age 39, Defensive back for the New York Giants. Was a starter in the Giants' 23-17 overtime loss to the Baltimore Colts in the 1958 NFL Championship.
- December 28 - Link Lyman, age 74. Played offensive tackle for the Chicago Bears from 1922-1934. Elected to the Pro Football Hall of Fame in 1964.

== Division races ==
From 1970 through 2002, there were three divisions (East, Central and West) in each conference. The winners of each division, and a fourth "wild card" team based on the best non-division winner, qualified for the playoffs. The tiebreaker rules were changed to start with head-to-head competition, followed by division records, common opponents records, and conference play.

=== National Football Conference ===
Week	East		Central		West		Wild Card	
1	Dallas, St. Louis, Washington	1–0–0	Detroit, Green Bay	1–0–0	Atlanta, San Francisco, Los Angeles	1–0–0	5 teams	1–0–0
2	Dallas, Washington	2–0–0	Minnesota	1–1–0	Los Angeles	1–0–1	Dallas, Washington	2–0–0
3	Washington	2–1–0	Detroit, Green Bay	2–1–0	Atlanta, San Francisco	2–1–0	3 teams	2–1–0
4	Washington	3–1–0	Detroit*	3–1–0	Los Angeles	2–1–1	2 teams	3–1–0
5	Washington	4–1–0	Green Bay	4–1–0	Los Angeles	3–1–1	Dallas	4–1–0
6	Washington	5–1–0	Green Bay*	4–2–0	Los Angeles	4–1–1	4 teams	4–2–0
7	Washington	6–1–0	Green Bay*	4–3–0	Los Angeles	4–2–1	Dallas	5–2–0
8	Washington	7–1–0	Green Bay*	5–3–0	Los Angeles	5–2–1	Dallas	6–2–0
9	Washington	8–1–0	Green Bay	6–3–0	Los Angeles	5–3–1	Dallas	7–2–0
10	Washington	9–1–0	Green Bay	7–3–0	Los Angeles*	5–4–1	Dallas	8–2–0
11	Washington	10–1–0	Green Bay*	7–4–0	San Francisco	6–4–1	Dallas	8–3–0
12	Washington	11–1–0	Green Bay	8–4–0	Atlanta	7–5–0	Dallas	9–3–0
13	Washington	11–2–0	Green Bay	9–4–0	San Francisco	7–5–1	Dallas	10–3–0
14	Washington	11–3–0	Green Bay	10–4–0	San Francisco	8–5–1	Dallas	10–4–0

=== American Football Conference ===
Week	East		Cent		West		Wild Card	
1	Miami, NY Jets	1–0–0	Cincinnati, Pittsburgh	1–0–0	Denver	1–0–0	Miami, NY Jets	1–0–0
2	Miami, NY Jets	2–0–0	Cincinnati	2–0–0	All 4 teams	1–1–0	Miami, NY Jets	2–0–0
3	Miami	3–0–0	Cleveland	2–1–0	Kansas City	2–1–0	Pittsburgh, San Diego, Cincinnati, NY Jets	2–1–0
4	Miami	4–0–0	Cincinnati	3–1–0	Kansas City	3–1–0	San Diego*	2–1–1
5	Miami	5–0–0	Cincinnati	4–1–0	Oakland	3–1–1	NY Jets*	3–2–0
6	Miami	6–0–0	Cincinnati*	4–2–0	Oakland	3–2–1	Pittsburgh*	4–2–0
7	Miami	7–0–0	Cincinnati*	5–2–0	Oakland	4–2–1	Pittsburgh*	5–2–0
8	Miami	8–0–0	Pittsburgh	6–2–0	Kansas City	5–3–0	Cleveland*	5–3–0
9	Miami	9–0–0	Pittsburgh	7–2–0	Oakland	5–3–1	Cleveland*	6–3–0
10	Miami	10–0–0	Cleveland	7–3–0	Oakland	6–3–1	Pittsburgh	7–3–0
11	Miami	11–0–0	Cleveland	8–3–0	Oakland	7–3–1	Pittsburgh	8–3–0
12	Miami	12–0–0	Pittsburgh	9–3–0	Oakland	8–3–1	Cleveland	8–4–0
13	Miami	13–0–0	Pittsburgh	10–3–0	Oakland	9–3–1	Cleveland	9–4–0
14	Miami	14–0–0	Pittsburgh	11–3–0	Oakland	10–3–1	Cleveland	10–4–0

== Final standings ==
AFC East
	W	L	T	PCT	DIV	CONF	PF	PA	STK
Miami Dolphins	14	0	0	1.000	8–0	11–0	385	171	W14
New York Jets	7	7	0	.500	6–2	6–5	367	324	L2
Baltimore Colts	5	9	0	.357	4–4	5–6	235	252	L2
Buffalo Bills	4	9	1	.321	2–6	2–9	257	377	W1
New England Patriots	3	11	0	.214	0–8	0–11	192	446	L1

AFC Central
	W	L	T	PCT	DIV	CONF	PF	PA	STK
Pittsburgh Steelers	11	3	0	.786	4–2	9–2	343	175	W4
Cleveland Browns	10	4	0	.714	5–1	9–2	268	249	W2
Cincinnati Bengals	8	6	0	.571	3–3	6–5	299	229	W1
Houston Oilers	1	13	0	.071	0–6	1–10	164	380	L11

AFC West
	W	L	T	PCT	DIV	CONF	PF	PA	STK
Oakland Raiders	10	3	1	.750	3–2–1	7–3–1	365	248	W6
Kansas City Chiefs	8	6	0	.571	4–2	6–5	287	254	W3
Denver Broncos	5	9	0	.357	2–4	4–6	325	350	W2
San Diego Chargers	4	9	1	.321	2–3–1	4–6–1	264	344	L3

NFC East
	W	L	T	PCT	DIV	CONF	PF	PA	STK
Washington Redskins	11	3	0	.786	7–1	10–1	336	218	L2
Dallas Cowboys	10	4	0	.714	6–2	7–4	319	240	L1
New York Giants	8	6	0	.571	5–3	7–4	331	247	W1
St. Louis Cardinals	4	9	1	.321	1–6–1	3–7–1	193	303	W2
Philadelphia Eagles	2	11	1	.179	0–7–1	0–10–1	145	352	L5

NFC Central
	W	L	T	PCT	DIV	CONF	PF	PA	STK
Green Bay Packers	10	4	0	.714	5–1	8–3	304	226	W3
Detroit Lions	8	5	1	.607	2–4	6–5	339	290	W1
Minnesota Vikings	7	7	0	.500	4–2	6–5	301	252	L2
Chicago Bears	4	9	1	.321	1–5	3–7–1	225	275	L1

NFC West
	W	L	T	PCT	DIV	CONF	PF	PA	STK
San Francisco 49ers	8	5	1	.607	3–2–1	6–4–1	353	249	W2
Atlanta Falcons	7	7	0	.500	3–3	5–5	269	274	L2
Los Angeles Rams	6	7	1	.464	4–2	5–5–1	291	286	L2
New Orleans Saints	2	11	1	.179	1–4–1	2–8–1	215	361	L3

== Playoffs ==
Note: Prior to the 1975 season, the home teams in the playoffs were decided based on a yearly rotation. Had the playoffs been seeded, the divisional matchups in the AFC would not have changed, but undefeated Miami would have had home field advantage for the AFC championship game. The NFC divisional matchups would have been #4 wild card Dallas, ineligible to play Washington, at #2 Green Bay and #3 San Francisco at #1 Washington.

Dec 24 – Miami Orange Bowl
WC	Cleveland	14
Dec 31 – Three Rivers Stadium
East	Miami	20
AFC
East	Miami	21
Dec 23 – Three Rivers Stadium
Cent.	Pittsburgh	17
AFC Championship
West	Oakland	7
Jan 14 – Los Angeles Memorial Coliseum
Cent.	Pittsburgh	13
Divisional round
AFC	Miami	14
Dec 23 – Candlestick Park
NFC	Washington	7
Super Bowl VII
WC	Dallas	30
Dec 31 – Robert F. Kennedy Memorial Stadium
West	San Francisco	28
NFC
WC	Dallas	3
Dec 24 – Robert F. Kennedy Memorial Stadium
East	Washington	26
NFC Championship
Cent.	Green Bay	3
East	Washington	16

== Awards ==
Most Valuable Player	Larry Brown, running back, Washington
Coach of the Year	Don Shula, Miami
Offensive Player of the Year	Larry Brown, running back, Washington
Defensive Player of the Year	Joe Greene, defensive tackle, Pittsburgh
Offensive Rookie of the Year	Franco Harris, running back, Pittsburgh
Defensive Rookie of the Year	Willie Buchanon, cornerback, Green Bay
Man of the Year	Willie Lanier, linebacker, Kansas
Comeback Player of the Year	Earl Morrall, quarterback, Miami
Super Bowl Most Valuable Player	Jake Scott, safety, Miami

== Coaching changes ==
=== Offseason ===
- Buffalo Bills: After finishing with a 1–13 record in 1971, Harvey Johnson was reassigned to the team's scouting department. Lou Saban then was named as Johnson's replacement, beginning his second stint after serving as the Bills head coach from 1962 to 1965.
- Chicago Bears: Abe Gibron replaced the fired Jim Dooley.
- Denver Broncos: John Ralston joined the Broncos as head coach. Lou Saban left the team after a 2–6–1 start in 1971. Offensive line coach Jerry Smith served as interim for the remaining five games.
- Houston Oilers: Ed Hughes resigned and was replaced by Bill Peterson.
- Philadelphia Eagles: Ed Khayat began his first full season as head coach. He replaced Jerry Williams, who was fired after three games in 1971.

=== In-season ===
- Baltimore Colts: Don McCafferty was fired after going 1-4 to start the season. John Sandusky was named as replacement.
- New England Patriots: John Mazur resigned after going 2-7 to start the season. Phil Bengtson then served as interim.

== Stadium changes ==
- The Kansas City Chiefs moved their home games from Municipal Stadium to Arrowhead Stadium at the Truman Sports Complex and became the twelfth team (of 26) to play its home games on artificial turf.

== Uniform changes ==
- The Denver Broncos discontinued wearing orange pants with their white jerseys as they had done from 1968 to 1971. The orange pants returned in 1978 and '79.
- The Detroit Lions added outlines to the jersey numbers
- The Houston Oilers switched from silver to blue helmets. They also discontinued their silver pants in favor of white pants for their blue jerseys, and blue pants for their white jerseys. These uniforms lasted three seasons.
- The Miami Dolphins reinstated their white jersey with alternating aqua and orange stripes on the sleeves, which was discontinued when Don Shula became coach. However, this style was not universally adopted, and several notable players, including Bob Griese and Larry Csonka, continued to wear the 1970-71 white jersey with plain sleeves. The Dolphins' aqua jerseys from 1970 to 1971 with plain sleeves, worn twice in 1972 (vs. Buffalo in week 6 and St. Louis in week 11), remained unchanged.
- The Pittsburgh Steelers switched from white pants to gold pants with their white jerseys.
- The Washington Redskins switched from gold to burgundy helmets, and from the "R" helmet logo (designed by the late Vince Lombardi) to the Native American head logo. The helmet remained unchanged, save for changing from gray face masks to gold in 1978 and a modified logo for 1982 only, until the Redskins nickname was retired prior to the 2020 season.

== Television ==
This was the third year under the league's four-year broadcast contracts with ABC, CBS, and NBC to televise Monday Night Football, the NFC package, and the AFC package, respectively.

Three games were not televised at all due to an International Brotherhood of Electrical Workers strike against CBS: Washington at New York Jets (November 5), Philadelphia at New York Giants (November 26) and New Orleans at New York Jets (December 3).
