= 1973 Detroit Lions season =

NFL team season

- Owner: William Clay Ford Sr.
- Head coach: Don McCafferty
- Home stadium: Tiger Stadium

Results
- Record: 6–7–1
- Division place: 2nd NFC Central
- Playoffs: Did not qualify

The 1973 Detroit Lions season was their 44th in the league. Don McCafferty, who served as an assistant under Don Shula during Shula's stint as head coach of the Baltimore Colts, and who as head coach himself coached the Colts to a Super Bowl V victory over the Dallas Cowboys, would replace Joe Schmidt as head coach. However, the team would still fail to improve and get better on their previous season's output of 8–5–1, finishing a mediocre 6–7–1. They missed the playoffs for the third straight season.

== NFL draft ==
1973 Detroit Lions draft
Round	Pick	Player	Position	College	Notes
1	17	Ernie Price	DE	Texas A&M	from Chicago
2	44	Leon Crosswhite	RB	Oklahoma	
3	58	John Brady	TE	Washington	from Chicago
3	71	Jim Laslavic	LB	Penn State	
3	75	Levi Johnson	CB	Texas A&I	from Los Angeles
4	81	Mike Hennigan	LB	Tennessee Tech	
4	91	Dick Jauron *	S	Yale	from Atlanta
4	96	Jim Hooks	RB	Central State (OK)	
7	175	John Andrews	DT	Morgan State	
8	200	Prentice McCray	S	Arizona State	
8	203	John Bledsoe	RB	Ohio State	from Cleveland
9	227	Ira Dean	DB	Baylor	
10	252	Ray Bonner	DB	Middle Tennessee State	
11	279	Scott Freeman	WR	Wyoming	
12	304	Tom Scott	WR	Washington	
13	331	John Moss	LB	Pittsburgh	
14	356	Jay Corey	OT	Santa Clara	
15	408	Larry Nickels	WR	Dayton	
17	435	Earl Belgrave	OT	Ohio State	
Made roster * Made at least one Pro Bowl during career

Notes

- Detroit traded TE Craig Cotton and its first-round selection (19th) to Chicago in exchange for Chicago's first- and third-round selections (17th and 58th).
- Detroit traded DB Al Clark to Los Angeles in exchange for the Rams' third-round selection (75th).
- Detroit traded its second-round selection in 1972 to Atlanta in exchange for CB Rudy Redmond, RB Sonny Campbell and Atlanta's fourth-round selection (91st).
- Detroit traded its fifth-round selection (123rd) to Washington in exchange for TE John Hilton.
- Detroit traded its sixth-round selection (148th) to St. Louis in exchange for LB Rick Ogle.
- Detroit traded DT Jerry Rush to Cleveland in exchange for the Browns' eighth-round pick (203rd).

== Personnel ==
=== Staff / Coaches ===
1973 Detroit Lions staff
Front office: Owner - William Clay Ford, Sr.; Vice President / General manager - Russ Thomas; Executive Vice President - Edwin J. Anderson; Treasurer - Newton S. Peters; Publicity Director / Business Manager - Lyall Smith; Assistant Publicity Director - Elliott Trumbull; Equipment manager - Roy Marklem; Assistant equipment manager - Charles "Rip" Collins; Head coaches: Head coach – Don McCafferty; Offensive coaches: Offensive Coordinator - Bill McPeak; Offensive Backs - Rick Forzano; Offensive Line - Leon McLaughlin; Wide Receivers - Raymond Berry	Defensive coaches: Defensive Backs / Secondary - Bob Hollway; Defensive Line - Ed Khayat; Linebackers / Special teams - John Meyer; Strength and conditioning: Trainer - Kent Falb; Assistant Trainer - Dave Smith

=== Final roster ===
1973 Detroit Lions roster
Quarterbacks: 17 Bill Cappleman; 19 Bill Munson; Running backs: 35 Leon Crosswhite; 24 Mel Farr; 36 Steve Owens; 42 Altie Taylor; 34 Mickey Zofko; Wide receivers: 86 Al Barnes; 89 Ron Jessie; 25 Earl McCullouch; 45 Jim O'Brien K; 49 Larry Walton; Tight ends: 81 John Hilton; 88 Charlie Sanders	Offensive linemen: 60 Guy Dennis G; 54 Ed Flanagan C; 76 Rocky Freitas T; 77 Mike Haggerty T; 64 Gordon Jolley T; 66 Bob Kowalkowski G; 67 Rocky Rasley G; 65 Dave Thompson C; 75 Jim Yarbrough T; Defensive linemen: 73 Bob Bell DT; 74 Larry Hand DE; 83 Jim Mitchell DE; 88 Herb Orvis DT; 72 Ernie Price DT; 82 Ken Sanders DE	Linebackers: 58 Mike Hennigan OLB; 52 Jim Laslavic MLB; 53 Mike Lucci MLB; 50 Paul Naumoff OLB; 57 Jim Teal OLB; 59 Charlie Weaver OLB; Defensive backs: 20 Lem Barney CB; 27 Miller Farr CB; 48 Willie Germany FS; 26 Dick Jauron FS; 23 Levi Johnson CB; 21 Jim Thrower SS; 28 Mike Weger SS; 46 Doug Wyatt FS; Special teams: 12 Errol Mann K; 18 Herman Weaver P	Reserve lists: 87 John Brady TE (IR); 30 Jim Hooks RB (IR); 11 Greg Landry QB (IR); 47 Wayne Rasmussen S (IR); 46 Rudy Redmond CB (IR); 66 John Small DT (IR); 63 Chuck Walton G (IR); _{45 active, 7 reserve, 0 practice / taxi squad} Rookies in italics

== Schedule ==
Week	Date	Opponent	Result	Record	Venue	Attendance	Recap
1	September 16	at Pittsburgh Steelers	**L** 10–24	0–1	Three Rivers Stadium	48,913	Recap
2	September 23	at **Green Bay Packers**	**T** 13–13	0–1–1	Lambeau Field	55,495	Recap
3	October 1	Atlanta Falcons	**W** 31–6	1–1–1	Tiger Stadium	45,599	Recap
4	October 7	**Minnesota Vikings**	**L** 9–23	1–2–1	Tiger Stadium	49,549	Recap
5	October 14	at New Orleans Saints	**L** 13–20	1–3–1	Tulane Stadium	57,810	Recap
6	October 21	Baltimore Colts	**L** 27–29	1–4–1	Tiger Stadium	48,058	Recap
7	October 28	**Green Bay Packers**	**W** 34–0	2–4–1	Tiger Stadium	43,616	Recap
8	November 4	San Francisco 49ers	**W** 30–20	3–4–1	Tiger Stadium	49,531	Recap
9	November 11	at **Minnesota Vikings**	**L** 7–28	3–5–1	Metropolitan Stadium	47,911	Recap
10	November 18	at **Chicago Bears**	**W** 30–7	4–5–1	Soldier Field	48,625	Recap
11	November 22	Washington Redskins	**L** 0–20	4–6–1	Tiger Stadium	46,807	Recap
12	December 2	at St. Louis Cardinals	**W** 20–16	5–6–1	Busch Memorial Stadium	44,982	Recap
13	December 9	**Chicago Bears**	**W** 40–7	6–6–1	Tiger Stadium	41,729	Recap
14	December 15	at Miami Dolphins	**L** 7–34	6–7–1	Miami Orange Bowl	53,375	Recap

Note: Intra-division opponents are in bold text.

=== Season summary ===
==== Week 1 ====
Detroit Lions (0–0) at Pittsburgh Steelers (0–0)

Quarter	1	2	3	4	Total
Lions	0	0	10	0	**10**
Steelers	0	3	7	14	**24**

at Three Rivers Stadium, Pittsburgh, PA

- Date: September 16
- Game time: 4:00 p.m.
- Game weather: 64 °F (18 °C); wind 11 mph (18 km/h)
- Game attendance: 48,913
- Referee: Fred Wyant
- Pro-Football-Reference.com

Game information

Lions

- Greg Landry
  11/27, 219 Yds, TD, 3 INT
  8 Rush, 65 Yds
- Ron Jessie
  3 Rec, 131 Yds, TD

Steelers

- Terry Bradshaw
  15/23, 124 Yds, 2 TD, INT
- John Fuqua
  26 Rush, 100 Yds
- Barry Pearson
  6 Rec, 58 Yds

Scoring summary

Quarter	Time	Drive			Team	Scoring information	Score	
Quarter	Time	Plays	Yards	TOP	Team	Scoring information	DET	PIT
2					Steelers	11-yard field goal by Roy Gerela	0	3
3					Steelers	Bradshaw 1-yard touchdown run, Gerela kick good	0	10
3					Lions	Jessie 84-yard touchdown reception from Landry, Mann kick good	7	10
3					Lions	40-yard field goal by Mann	10	10
4					Steelers	McMakin 24-yard touchdown reception from Bradshaw, Gerela kick good	10	17
4					Steelers	Shanklin 6-yard touchdown reception from Bradshaw, Gerela kick good	10	24
"TOP" = time of possession. For other American football terms, see Glossary of American football.							10	24

=== Week 14 ===
Week Fourteen: Detroit Lions (6–6–1) at Miami Dolphins (11–2)

Quarter	1	2	3	4	Total
Lions	0	0	0	7	**7**
**Dolphins**	14	17	3	0	**34**

at Orange Bowl, Miami, Florida

- Date: Saturday, December 15
- Game time: 1:00 p.m. EDT
- Game weather: 69 °F (21 °C), wind 7 mph (11 km/h)
- Pro-Football-Reference.com

Game information

**First quarter**

- MIA – Paul Warfield 21-yard pass from Bob Griese (Garo Yepremian kick) – **Dolphins 7–0**
- MIA – Paul Warfield 7-yard pass from Bob Griese (Garo Yepremian kick) – **Dolphins 14–0**

**Second quarter**

- MIA – Garo Yepremian 27-yard field goal – **Dolphins 17–0**
- MIA – Paul Warfield 16-yard pass from Bob Griese (Garo Yepremian kick) – **Dolphins 24–0**
- MIA – Paul Warfield 4-yard pass from Bob Griese (Garo Yepremian kick) – **Dolphins 31–0**

**Third quarter**

- MIA – Garo Yepremian 28-yard field goal – **Dolphins 34–0**

**Fourth quarter**

- DET – Steve Owens 5-yard run (Errol Mann kick) – **Dolphins 34–7**

**Lions**

- Bill Munson
  8/17, 73 Yds, INT
- Steve Owens
  27 Rush, 113 Yds, TD
  6 Rec, 56 Yds

**Dolphins**

- Bob Griese
  11/15, 141 Yds, 4 TD
- Larry Csonka
  10 Rush, 51 Yds
- Paul Warfield
  6 Rec, 103 Yds, 4 TD

== Standings ==
NFC Central
	W	L	T	PCT	DIV	CONF	PF	PA	STK
Minnesota Vikings	12	2	0	.857	6–0	10–1	296	168	W2
Detroit Lions	6	7	1	.464	3–2–1	6–4–1	271	247	L1
Green Bay Packers	5	7	2	.429	1–4–1	4–6–1	202	259	W1
Chicago Bears	3	11	0	.214	1–5	1–9	195	334	L6
