= 1973 New Orleans Saints season =

NFL team season

- Owner: John W. Mecom Jr.
- Head coach: John North
- Home stadium: Tulane Stadium

Results
- Record: 5–9
- Division place: 3rd NFC West
- Playoffs: Did not qualify
- Pro Bowlers: None

The 1973 New Orleans Saints season was the team's seventh as a member of the National Football League (NFL). They improved on their previous season's output of 2–11–1, winning five games. The team failed to qualify for the playoffs for the seventh consecutive season.

New Orleans made a disastrous trade in January, dealing the No. 2 overall selection in the 1973 NFL draft to the Baltimore Colts for defensive end Billy Newsome. The Colts used the traded pick to select LSU quarterback Bert Jones, who guided the team to three consecutive AFC East division championships from 1975 to 1977.

J.D. Roberts, who became the Saints' second head coach midway through the 1970 season, was fired August 27, two days after a 31–6 loss to the New England Patriots in the fourth exhibition game. Roberts was replaced by offensive backfield coach John North. Roberts ended his Saints tenure with a 7–25–3 mark.

The Saints opened the year with a 62–7 debacle in the loss to the Atlanta Falcons at home. The first quarter of that game was scoreless. Eight days later, they were drubbed on Monday Night Football by the Dallas Cowboys, 40–3. The game at Texas Stadium was the only one in 1973 in which the Saints wore their black jerseys, and they would not wear them again in the regular season until week 10 of 1975.

They did however hold O. J. Simpson to 74 yard on 20 carries in the team's first ever shutout, with a 13–0 win over the Buffalo Bills. Simpson went on to break the single season rushing record in yardage that year with 2,003. New Orleans, after the disastrous opener, won 5 of its remaining 6 home games. They did not, however, win a road game.

== Offseason ==
=== NFL draft ===
1973 New Orleans Saints draft
Round	Pick	Player	Position	College	Notes
2	29	Derland Moore	Defensive tackle	Oklahoma	
2	51	Steve Baumgartner	Defensive end	Purdue	
3	66	Pete Van Valkenburg	Running back	Brigham Young	
4	86	Jim Merlo	Linebacker	Stanford	
6	134	Marty Shuford	Running back	Arizona	
7	158	Bill Cahill	Defensive back	Washington	
8	185	Bob Peterson	Guard	Utah	
8	207	Doug Winslow	Wide receiver	Drake	
9	210	Mike Fink	Defensive back	Missouri	
10	237	Jeff Horsley	Running back	North Carolina Central	
11	262	James Owens	Running back	Auburn	
12	289	Paul Orndorff	Tight end	Tampa	
13	314	Richard Watkins	Defensive tackle	Weber State	
14	341	Paul Fersen	Offensive tackle	Georgia	
15	366	Mike Evenson	Center	North Dakota State	
16	393	Howard Stevens	Running back	Louisville	
17	418	Bobby Garner	Tight end	Winston-Salem State	
Made roster

== Personnel ==
=== Staff ===
1973 New Orleans Saints staff
Front office: President – John W. Mecom, Jr.; Executive Vice President – Richard F. Gordon, Jr.; Head coaches: Head coach – John North; Offensive coaches: Offensive Backfield – Lynn Amadee; Offensive Line – Dixie White	Defensive coaches: Defensive Line – Bob Cummings; Linebackers – Marv Matuszak; Defensive Backfield – Bud Whitehead

=== Roster ===
1973 New Orleans Saints roster
Quarterbacks (QB): 15 Bob Davis; 8 Archie Manning; 12 Bobby Scott; Running backs (RB): 38 Bill Butler; 32 Lincoln Minor; 34 Jess Phillips; 23 Joe Profit; 22 Howard Stevens; Wide receivers (WR): 86 Jubilee Dunbar; 41 Bob Newland; 17 Speedy Thomas; 80 Doug Winslow; Tight ends (TE): 89 Bert Askson; 85 John Beasley; 83 Len Garrett; 87 Mike Kelly	Offensive linemen (OL): 51 John Didion C; 71 Paul Fersen T; 77 Carl Johnson T; 50 Jake Kupp G; 76 Don Morrison T; 70 Craig Robinson T; 66 Royce Smith G; 61 Del Williams G; Defensive linemen (DL): 63 Steve Baumgartner DE; 88 Andy Dorris DE; 74 Derland Moore DT; 81 Billy Newsome DE; 72 Joe Owens DE; 82 Bob Pollard DT; 75 Elex Price DT	Linebackers (LB): 59 Wayne Colman OLB; 55 Bob Creech OLB; 58 Joe Federspiel MLB; 64 Ray Hester OLB; 53 Rick Kingrea MLB; 57 Jim Merlo OLB; 52 Dick Palmer OLB; Defensive backs (DB): 44 Mike Fink CB; 24 Johnny Fuller SS; 30 Ernie Jackson CB; 11 Bivian Lee CB; 25 Jerry Moore FS; 21 Nate Ramsey CB/S; 37 Tom Myers FS; Special teams (ST): 19 Bill McClard K; 10 Steve O'Neal P	Reserve: 79 Ron Billingsley DT (IR); 36 Robert Brown TE (IR); 56 Willie Hall LB (IR); 18 Hugo Hollas SS (IR); 39 Odell Lawson RB (IR); Rookies in italics

== Schedule ==
Week	Date	Opponent	Result	Record	Venue	Attendance
1	September 16	**Atlanta Falcons**	**L** 7–62	0–1	Tulane Stadium	66,428
2	September 24	at Dallas Cowboys	**L** 3–40	0–2	Texas Stadium	52,715
3	September 30	at Baltimore Colts	**L** 10–14	0–3	Memorial Stadium	52,293
4	October 7	Chicago Bears	**W** 21–16	1–3	Tulane Stadium	56,561
5	October 14	Detroit Lions	**W** 20–13	2–3	Tulane Stadium	57,810
6	October 21	at **San Francisco 49ers**	**L** 0–40	2–4	Candlestick Park	52,881
7	October 28	Washington Redskins	**W** 19–3	3–4	Tulane Stadium	66,315
8	November 4	Buffalo Bills	**W** 13–0	4–4	Tulane Stadium	74,770
9	November 11	at **Los Angeles Rams**	**L** 7–29	4–5	Los Angeles Memorial Coliseum	70,358
10	November 18	at San Diego Chargers	**L** 14–17	4–6	San Diego Stadium	34,848
11	November 25	**Los Angeles Rams**	**L** 13–24	4–7	Tulane Stadium	67,192
12	December 2	at Green Bay Packers	**L** 10–30	4–8	Milwaukee County Stadium	46,092
13	December 9	**San Francisco 49ers**	**W** 16–10	5–8	Tulane Stadium	62,490
14	December 16	at **Atlanta Falcons**	**L** 10–14	5–9	Atlanta Stadium	34,147
Note: Intra-division opponents are in **bold** text.

=== Standings ===
NFC West
	W	L	T	PCT	DIV	CONF	PF	PA	STK
Los Angeles Rams	12	2	0	.857	5–1	9–2	388	178	W6
Atlanta Falcons	9	5	0	.643	4–2	7–4	318	224	W1
San Francisco 49ers	5	9	0	.357	2–4	4–7	262	319	L2
New Orleans Saints	5	9	0	.357	1–5	4–7	163	312	L1
