= 1973 St. Louis Cardinals (NFL) season =

American football team season

1973 St. Louis Cardinals season
- Owner: Bill Bidwill
- Head coach: Don Coryell
- Home stadium: Busch Memorial Stadium

Results
- Record: 4–9–1
- Division place: 4th NFC East
- Playoffs: Did not qualify
- Pro Bowlers: None

The 1973 St. Louis Cardinals season was the franchise's 54th season in the National Football League (NFL). Led by first-year head coach Don Coryell, the Cardinals matched their previous output of 4–9–1, finishing with that record for the third straight season. They failed to reach the playoffs for the 25th straight season (not counting an appearance in the Playoff Bowl following the 1964 season).

The game vs. the Oakland Raiders was the first between the teams, and the last until 1983, by which time the Raiders had moved to Los Angeles. It would be the last time the Raiders played at the Cardinals until 1998 in Tempe, Arizona, and the Raiders' last game in St. Louis until 2002 when they played the Rams.

Their tied game, their first NFL game against the Denver Broncos, was the nearest they would come to beating that franchise until 2010, and the only time the Broncos would play at Busch Memorial Stadium (they would play at Edward Jones Dome in 2000).

Hired in January, Coryell was previously the head coach at San Diego State for twelve seasons.

== Offseason ==
1973 St. Louis Cardinals draft
Round	Pick	Player	Position	College	Notes
1	5	Dave Butz *	Defensive tackle	Purdue	
2	45	Gary Keithley	Quarterback	UTEP	
3	59	Fred Sturt	Guard	Bowling Green	
3	63	Terry Metcalf	Running back	Long Beach State	
5	109	Tom Brahaney	Center	Oklahoma	
6	137	Dwayne Crump	Defensive back	Fresno State	
6	148	Phil Andre	Defensive back	Washington	
7	164	Ken Jones	Tackle	Oklahoma	
8	188	Ken Garrett	Running back	Wake Forest	
9	213	Ken King	Linebacker	Kentucky	
10	242	Bonnie Sloan	Defensive tackle	Austin Peay	
11	267	Dan Sanspree	Defensive end	Auburn	
12	292	Dean Unruh	Tackle	Oklahoma	
13	317	Ed Robinson	Defensive back	Lamar	
14	346	Dan Peiffer	Center	Southeast Missouri State	
15	371	Mel Parker	Linebacker	Duke	
16	396	Jim Hann	Linebacker	Montana	
17	421	Eric Crone	Quarterback	Harvard	
Made roster * Made at least one Pro Bowl during career

== Roster ==
St. Louis Cardinals roster
Quarterbacks: 17 Jim Hart; 12 Gary Keithley P; Running backs: 44 Donny Anderson; 21 Terry Metcalf; 35 Jim Otis; 31 Don Shy; Wide receivers: 85 Mel Gray; 84 Walker Gillette; 30 Gary Hammond; 37 Marv Owens; 28 Ahmad Rashad; Tight ends: 83 Jim McFarland; 81 Jackie Smith	Offensive linemen: 54 Tom Banks G/C; 51 Tom Brahaney C; 72 Dan Dierdorf T; 60 Roger Finnie G; 55 Gene Hamlin C; 74 Bob Reynolds T; 68 Mike Taylor T; 64 Bob Young G; Defensive linemen: 70 Leo Brooks DE/DT; 65 Dave Butz DE; 71 John Richardson DT; 75 Bob Rowe DT; 74 Council Rudolph DE; 78 Ron Yankowski DE	Linebackers: 57 Mark Arneson MLB; 59 Pete Barnes OLB; 52 Jack LeVeck MLB; 58 Terry Miller OLB; 87 Jeff Staggs OLB; 67 Larry Stallings OLB; Defensive backs: 26 Dwayne Crump CB; 42 Chuck Detwiler SS; 41 Clarence Duren SS; 45 Jim Tolbert FS/CB; 40 Eric Washington CB; 22 Roger Wehrli CB; Special teams: 25 Jim Bakken K	Reserve lists: 38 Leon Burns RB (IR); 76 Ron Davis DE (IR); 60 Conrad Dobler G (IR); 73 Ernie McMillan T (IR); 27 Eddie Moss RB (IR); 50 Wayne Mulligan C (IR); 53 Jamie Rivers LB (IR); 49 Leroy Sledge RB (IR); 63 Fred Sturt G/T (IR); 43 Norm Thompson CB/FS (IR); Taxi squad: 33 Willie Belton RB; 65 Roger Bernhardt G; 34 Charles Davis RB; 61 Fred DeBernardi DE; 36 Ken Garrett RB; 20 Clancy Oliver FS; 79 Bonnie Sloan DT; rookies in italics

== Schedule ==
Week	Date	Opponent	Result	Record	Venue	Attendance
1	September 16	at **Philadelphia Eagles**	**W** 34–23	1–0	Veterans Stadium	61,103
2	September 23	**Washington Redskins**	**W** 34–27	2–0	Busch Memorial Stadium	50,316
3	September 30	at **Dallas Cowboys**	**L** 10–45	2–1	Texas Stadium	64,729
4	October 7	Oakland Raiders	**L** 10–17	2–2	Busch Memorial Stadium	49,051
5	October 14	**Philadelphia Eagles**	**L** 24–27	2–3	Busch Memorial Stadium	44,400
6	October 21	at **Washington Redskins**	**L** 13–31	2–4	RFK Stadium	54,381
7	October 28	**New York Giants**	**W** 35–27	3–4	Busch Memorial Stadium	47,589
8	November 4	Denver Broncos	**T** 17–17	3–4–1	Busch Memorial Stadium	46,565
9	November 11	at Green Bay Packers	**L** 21–25	3–5–1	Lambeau Field	52,922
10	November 18	at **New York Giants**	**L** 13–24	3–6–1	Yale Bowl	65,795
11	November 25	at Cincinnati Bengals	**L** 24–42	3–7–1	Riverfront Stadium	50,918
12	December 2	Detroit Lions	**L** 16–20	3–8–1	Busch Memorial Stadium	44,982
13	December 9	at Atlanta Falcons	**W** 32–10	4–8–1	Atlanta Stadium	48,030
14	December 16	**Dallas Cowboys**	**L** 3–30	4–9–1	Busch Memorial Stadium	43,946
Note: Intra-division opponents are in **bold** text.

=== Standings ===
NFC East
	W	L	T	PCT	DIV	CONF	PF	PA	STK
Dallas Cowboys	10	4	0	.714	6–2	8–3	382	203	W3
Washington Redskins	10	4	0	.714	6–2	8–3	325	198	W1
Philadelphia Eagles	5	8	1	.393	3–4–1	3–7–1	310	393	L1
St. Louis Cardinals	4	9	1	.321	3–5	4–7	286	365	L1
New York Giants	2	11	1	.179	1–6–1	1–9–1	226	362	L4
