= 1973 NFL draft =

National Football League draft

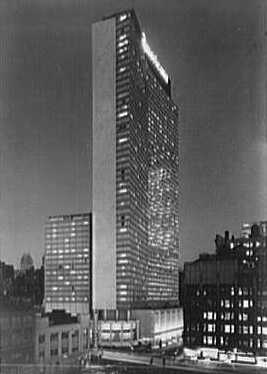
- Americana Hotel (location of the draft), photographed in 1962

General information
- Date: January 30–31, 1973
- Location: Americana Hotel in New York City, New York

Overview
- 442 total selections in 17 rounds
- League: NFL
- First selection: John Matuszak, DE; Houston Oilers
- Mr. Irrelevant: Charlie Wade, WR; Miami Dolphins
- Most selections (23): Los Angeles Rams
- Fewest selections (10): Washington Redskins
- Hall of Famers: 5: G John Hannah; P Ray Guy; G Joe DeLamielleure; QB Dan Fouts; WR Drew Pearson

The 1973 NFL draft was held January 30–31, 1973, at the Americana Hotel in New York City, New York. With the first overall pick of the draft, the Houston Oilers selected defensive end John Matuszak.

== Player selections ==
*	= compensatory selection
†	= Pro Bowler
‡	= Hall of Famer

Positions key
Offense	Defense	Special teams
QB — Quarterback; RB — Running back; FB — Fullback; WR — Wide receiver; TE — Tight end; OL — Offensive lineman; T — Tackle; G — Guard; C — Center	DL — Defensive lineman; DT — Defensive tackle (Note: Includes nose tackle (NT)); DE — Defensive end; EDGE — Edge rusher; LB — Linebacker (Note: Includes middle linebacker (MLB/MIKE), weakside linebacker (WILL), strongside linebacker (SAM), off-ball linebacker, and outside linebacker (OLB)); DB — Defensive back; CB — Cornerback; S — Safety (Note: Includes free safety (FS) and strong safety (SS))	K — Kicker (Note: Also known as a placekicker (PK)); P — Punter; LS — Long snapper; RS — Return specialist (Note: Includes kickoff and punt returners)

=== Round 1–10 ===
Rnd.	Pick	Team	Player	Pos.	College	Notes
1	1	Houston Oilers	John Matuszak	DE	Tampa	
1	2	Baltimore Colts	Bert Jones ^{†}	QB	LSU	from New Orleans
1	3	Philadelphia Eagles	Jerry Sisemore ^{†}	T	Texas	
1	4	New England Patriots	John Hannah^{‡}^{†}	G	Alabama	
1	5	St. Louis Cardinals	Dave Butz ^{†}	DT	Purdue	
1	6	Philadelphia Eagles	Charle Young ^{†}	TE	USC	from San Diego
1	7	Buffalo Bills	Paul Seymour	TE	Michigan	
1	8	Chicago Bears	Wally Chambers ^{†}	DE	Eastern Kentucky	
1	9	Denver Broncos	Otis Armstrong ^{†}	RB	Purdue	
1	10	Baltimore Colts	Joe Ehrmann ^{†}	DT	Syracuse	
1	11	New England Patriots	Sam Cunningham ^{†}	FB	USC	From Los Angeles
1	12	Minnesota Vikings	Chuck Foreman ^{†}	RB	Miami (FL)	
1	13	New York Jets	Burgess Owens	S	Miami (FL)	
1	14	Houston Oilers	George Amundson	RB	Iowa State	from Atlanta
1	15	Cincinnati Bengals	Isaac Curtis ^{†}	WR	San Diego State	
1	16	Cleveland Browns	Steve Holden	WR	Arizona State	from N. Y. Giants
1	17	Detroit Lions	Ernie Price	DE	Texas A&I	from Kansas City via Chicago
1	18	San Francisco 49ers	Mike Holmes	S	Texas Southern	
1	19	New England Patriots	Darryl Stingley	WR	Purdue	from Detroit via Chicago
1	20	Dallas Cowboys	Billy Joe Dupree ^{†}	TE	Michigan State	
1	21	Green Bay Packers	Barry Smith	WR	Florida State	
1	22	Cleveland Browns	Pete Adams	T	USC	
1	23	Oakland Raiders	Ray Guy^{‡}^{†}	P	Southern Miss	
1	24	Pittsburgh Steelers	J. T. Thomas ^{†}	CB	Florida State	
1	25	San Diego Chargers	Johnny Rodgers	WR	Nebraska	From Washington via Baltimore Heisman Trophy winner
1	26	Buffalo Bills	Joe DeLamielleure^{‡}^{†}	G	Michigan State	From Miami
2	27	Kansas City Chiefs	Gary Butler	TE	Rice	from Houston
2	28	Philadelphia Eagles	Guy Morriss	G	TCU	
2	29	New Orleans Saints	Derland Moore	DE	Oklahoma	
2	30	Cleveland Browns	Greg Pruitt ^{†}	RB	Oklahoma	from New England via N. Y. Giants
2	31	Los Angeles Rams	Cullen Bryant	RB	Colorado	from San Diego
2	32	Buffalo Bills	Jeff Winans	DT	USC	
2	33	Chicago Bears	Gary Huff	QB	Florida State	
2	34	Minnesota Vikings	Jackie Wallace	CB	Arizona	from St. Louis
2	35	Baltimore Colts	Mike Barnes ^{†}	DE	Miami (FL)	
2	36	Denver Broncos	Barney Chavous	DE	South Carolina State	
2	37	Los Angeles Rams	Ron Jaworski ^{†}	QB	Youngstown State	
2	38	New York Jets	Robert Woods	T	Tennessee State	
2	39	Atlanta Falcons	Greg Marx	DT	Notre Dame	
2	40	New York Giants	Brad Van Pelt ^{†}	LB	Michigan State	from Minnesota
2	41	San Francisco 49ers	Willie Harper	LB	Nebraska	from N. Y. Giants
2	42	Los Angeles Rams	Jim Youngblood ^{†}	LB	Tennessee Tech	from Kansas City
2	43	Cincinnati Bengals	Albert Chandler	TE	Oklahoma	
2	44	Detroit Lions	Leon Crosswhite	RB	Oklahoma	
2	45	St. Louis Cardinals	Gary Keithley	QB	UTEP	from San Francisco
2	46	Dallas Cowboys	Golden Richards	WR	Hawaii	from Green Bay
2	47	Cleveland Browns	Jim Stienke	CB	Southwest Texas State	
2	48	Chicago Bears	Gary Hrivnak	DT	Purdue	from Dallas
2	49	Oakland Raiders	Monte Johnson	LB	Nebraska	
2	50	Pittsburgh Steelers	Ken Phares	DB	Mississippi State	
2	51	New Orleans Saints	Steve Baumgartner	DE	Purdue	from Washington via N. Y. Giants
2	52	Miami Dolphins	Chuck Bradley	C	Oregon	
3	53	Dallas Cowboys	Harvey Martin ^{†}	DE	East Texas State	from Houston via New Orleans
3	54	Denver Broncos	Paul Howard	G	BYU	from New Orleans via Washington through Cleveland
3	55	Philadelphia Eagles	Randy Logan ^{†}	S	Michigan	
3	56	New England Patriots	Brad Dusek	DB	Texas A&M	
3	57	Buffalo Bills	Joe Ferguson	QB	Arkansas	
3	58	Detroit Lions	John Brady	TE	Washington	from Chicago
3	59	St. Louis Cardinals	Fred Sturt	G	Bowling Green	
3	60	Los Angeles Rams	Tim Stokes	T	Oregon	from San Diego
3	61	Baltimore Colts	Bill Olds	RB	Nebraska	from Houston
3	62	Baltimore Colts	Jamie Rotella	LB	Tennessee	
3	63	St. Louis Cardinals	Terry Metcalf ^{†}	RB	Long Beach State	from Los Angeles
3	64	San Diego Chargers	Dan Fouts^{‡}^{†}	QB	Oregon	from Atlanta via Oakland
3	65	Minnesota Vikings	Jim Lash	WR	Northwestern	
3	66	New Orleans Saints	Pete Van Valkenburg	RB	BYU	from N. Y. Jets
3	67	Cleveland Browns	Bob Crum	DE	Arizona	from Kansas City via Baltimore
3	68	Cincinnati Bengals	Tim George	WR	Carson–Newman	
3	69	New York Giants	Rich Glover	DT	Nebraska	
3	70	Denver Broncos	John Wood	DT	LSU	from San Francisco via Washington through San Diego
3	71	Detroit Lions	Jim Laslavic	LB	Penn State	
3	72	Cleveland Browns	Paul Krause	T	Central Michigan	from Cleveland
3	73	New England Patriots	Charles Davis	RB	Alcorn A&M	from Dallas
3	74	Green Bay Packers	Tom MacLeod	LB	Minnesota	
3	75	Detroit Lions	Levi Johnson	CB	Texas A&I	from Oakland via Los Angeles
3	76	Pittsburgh Steelers	Roger Bernhardt	G	Kansas	
3	77	Buffalo Bills	Bob Kampa	DT	California	from Washington
3	78	Miami Dolphins	Leon Gray ^{†}	G	Jackson State	
4	79	Houston Oilers	Gregg Bingham	LB	Purdue	
4	80	Minnesota Vikings	Mike Wells	QB	Illinois	from Philadelphia
4	81	Detroit Lions	Mike Hennigan	LB	Tennessee Tech	from New Orleans
4	82	New England Patriots	Allen Gallagher	T	USC	
4	83	Baltimore Colts	Gery Palmer	T	Kansas	from Chicago via Philadelphia
4	84	San Diego Chargers	James Thaxton	TE	Tennessee State	from St. Louis via Chicago
4	85	Baltimore Colts	Ollie Smith	WR	Tennessee State	from San Diego
4	86	New Orleans Saints	Jim Merlo	LB	Stanford	from Baltimore
4	87	Buffalo Bills	Donnie Walker	DB	Central State (OH)	
4	88	Denver Broncos	Tom Jackson ^{†}	LB	Louisville	
4	89	Kansas City Chiefs	John Lohmeyer	DE	Emporia State	from Minnesota
4	90	New York Jets	Bill Ferguson	DE	San Diego State	
4	91	Detroit Lions	Dick Jauron ^{†}	S	Yale	from Atlanta
4	92	Oakland Raiders	Perry Smith	CB	Colorado State	from Los Angeles
4	93	Cleveland Browns	Andy Dorris	LB	New Mexico State	from Cincinnati via Baltimore
4	94	Atlanta Falcons	Tom Geredine	WR	Northeast Missouri State	from N. Y. Giants
4	95	Los Angeles Rams	Eddie McMillan	CB	Florida State	from Kansas City
4	96	Detroit Lions	Jim Hooks	RB	Central State (OK)	
4	97	San Diego Chargers	Bill Singletary	LB	Temple	from San Francisco via Washington
4	98	Dallas Cowboys	Drane Scrivener	DB	Tulsa	
4	99	Los Angeles Rams	Terry Nelson	TE	Arkansas–Pine Bluff	from Green Bay
4	100	Cleveland Browns	Randy Mattingly	QB	Evansville	
4	101	Oakland Raiders	Joe Wylie	WR	Oklahoma	
4	102	Pittsburgh Steelers	Gail Clark	LB	Michigan State	
4	103	Buffalo Bills	Jeff Yeates	DT	Boston College	from Washington
4	104	Miami Dolphins	Dave "Bo" Rather	WR	Michigan	
5	105	Houston Oilers	Edesel Garrison	WR	USC	
5	106	Pittsburgh Steelers	Dave Reavis	DE	Arkansas	from New Orleans via Washington
5	107	Chicago Bears	Allan Ellis ^{†}	CB	UCLA	from Philadelphia
5	108	New England Patriots	Doug Dumler	C	Nebraska	
5	109	St. Louis Cardinals	Tom Brahaney	C	Oklahoma	
5	110	Buffalo Bills	Wallace Francis	WR	Arkansas State	from San Diego
5	111	Miami Dolphins	Don Strock	QB	Virginia Tech	from Buffalo
5	112	San Francisco 49ers	Mike Fulk	LB	Indiana	from Chicago
5	113	Denver Broncos	Charles McTorry	DB	Tennessee State	
5	114	Baltimore Colts	David Taylor	G	Catawba	
5	115	Los Angeles Rams	Steve Jones	RB	Duke	
5	116	New York Jets	Bruce Bannon	LB	Penn State	
5	117	Washington Redskins	Charles Cantrell	G	Lamar	from Atlanta
5	118	Minnesota Vikings	Brent McClanahan	RB	Arizona State	
5	119	New York Giants	Leon McQuay	RB	Tampa	
5	120	Kansas City Chiefs	Fred Grambau	DE	Michigan	
5	121	Cincinnati Bengals	Bob McCall	RB	Arizona	
5	122	San Francisco 49ers	Ed Beverly	WR	Arizona State	
5	123	San Diego Chargers	Willie McGee	WR	Alcorn A&M	from Detroit via Washington
5	124	Oakland Raiders	Louis Neal	WR	Prairie View A&M	from Green Bay
5	125	San Diego Chargers	Jon Knoble	LB	Weber State	from Cleveland
5	126	Dallas Cowboys	Bruce Walton	T	UCLA	
5	127	Oakland Raiders	Ron Mikolajczyk	T	Tampa	
5	128	Pittsburgh Steelers	Larry Clark	LB	Northern Illinois	
5	129	Los Angeles Rams	Cody Jones ^{†}	DE	San Jose State	from Washington
5	130	Miami Dolphins	Dave McCurry	S	Iowa State	
6	131	Houston Oilers	Ron Mayo	TE	Morgan State	
6	132	Philadelphia Eagles	Bob Picard	WR	Eastern Washington	
6	133	Los Angeles Rams	Jim Peterson	DE	San Diego State	from New Orleans via Washington
6	134	New Orleans Saints	Marty Shuford	RB	Arizona	from Denver
6	135	San Diego Chargers	Marvin Roberts	C	Michigan State	
6	136	Buffalo Bills	John Skorupan	LB	Penn State	
6	137	St. Louis Cardinals	Dwayne Crump	CB	Fresno State	
6	138	Chicago Bears	Mike Creaney	C	Notre Dame	
6	139	Minnesota Vikings	Doug Kingsriter	TE	Minnesota	from Baltimore via New Orleans
6	140	Pittsburgh Steelers	Ron Bell	RB	Illinois State	from Denver
6	141	Los Angeles Rams	Jason Caldwell	WR	North Carolina Central	
6	142	Atlanta Falcons	Nick Bebout	T	Wyoming	
6	143	Minnesota Vikings	Fred Abbott	LB	Florida	
6	144	New York Jets	Travis Roach	G	Texas	
6	145	Kansas City Chiefs	Doug Jones	S	Cal State Northridge	
6	146	Cincinnati Bengals	Bob Jones	DB	Virginia Union	
6	147	New York Giants	Wade Brantley	DT	Troy State	
6	148	St. Louis Cardinals	Phil Andre	DB	Washington	from Detroit
6	149	San Francisco 49ers	Arthur Moore	DT	Tulsa	
6	150	Cleveland Browns	Van Green	S	Shaw	
6	151	Dallas Cowboys	Bob Leyen	G	Yale	
6	152	Green Bay Packers	Tom Toner	LB	Idaho State	
6	153	Oakland Raiders	Brent Myers	T	Purdue	
6	154	Pittsburgh Steelers	Glenn Scolnik	WR	Indiana	
6	155	New York Jets	Rick Harrell	C	Clemson	from Washington
6	156	Miami Dolphins	Ed Newman ^{†}	G	Duke	
7	157	Houston Oilers	Shelby Jordan	T	Washington (MO)	
7	158	New Orleans Saints	Bill Cahill	S	Washington	
7	159	Philadelphia Eagles	William Wynn	DE	Tennessee State	
7	160	Miami Dolphins	Kevin Reilly	LB	Villanova	from New England
7	161	Los Angeles Rams	Steve Brown	LB	Oregon State	from Chicago
7	162	Buffalo Bills	Brian McConnell	LB	Michigan State	
7	163	Miami Dolphins	Benny Shepherd	RB	Arkansas State	from San Diego
7	164	St. Louis Cardinals	Ken Jones	T	Oklahoma	
7	165	Denver Broncos	Mike Askea	T	Stanford	
7	166	Denver Broncos	John Grant	DE	USC	from Baltimore
7	167	Los Angeles Rams	Bill DuLac	G	Eastern Michigan	
7	168	Minnesota Vikings	Josh Brown	RB	Southwest Texas State	
7	169	New York Jets	Mike Haggard	WR	South Carolina	
7	170	Atlanta Falcons	Tommy Campbell	CB	Iowa State	
7	171	Cincinnati Bengals	Bob Maddox	DE	Frostburg State	
7	172	New York Giants	Rod Freeman	TE	Vanderbilt	
7	173	Kansas City Chiefs	Donn Smith	T	Purdue	
7	174	San Francisco 49ers	John Mitchell	DE	Alabama	
7	175	Detroit Lions	John Andrews	DT	Morgan State	
7	176	Dallas Cowboys	Rodrigo Barnes	LB	Rice	
7	177	Green Bay Packers	John Muller	T	Iowa	
7	178	Miami Dolphins	Willie Hatter	WR	Northern Illinois	from Cleveland
7	179	Oakland Raiders	Gary Weaver	LB	Fresno State	
7	180	Pittsburgh Steelers	Nate Dorsey	DE	Mississippi Valley State	
7	181	Buffalo Bills	John Ford	TE	Henderson State	from Washington
7	182	Miami Dolphins	Tom Smith	RB	Miami (FL)	
8	183	Houston Oilers	Joe Blahak	CB	Nebraska	
8	184	Philadelphia Eagles	Dan Lintner	DB	Indiana	
8	185	New Orleans Saints	Bob Peterson	G	Utah	
8	186	New England Patriots	Ike Brown	RB	Western Kentucky	
8	187	Chicago Bears	Conrad Graham	DB	Tennessee	
8	188	St. Louis Cardinals	Kenneth Garrett	RB	Wake Forest	
8	189	Baltimore Colts	Ray Oldham	S	Middle Tennessee	from San Diego
8	190	Buffalo Bills	Lee Fobbs	RB	Grambling	
8	191	Baltimore Colts	Bill Windauer	G	Iowa	
8	192	Pittsburgh Steelers	Loren Toews	LB	California	from Denver
8	193	Washington Redskins	Mike Hancock	TE	Idaho State	from Los Angeles
8	194	New York Jets	Rick Seifert	DB	Ohio State	
8	195	Atlanta Falcons	Tom Reed	G	Arkansas	
8	196	Minnesota Vikings	Craig Darling	T	Iowa	
8	197	Kansas City Chiefs	Al Palewicz	LB	Miami (FL)	
8	198	New York Giants	George Hasenohrl	DT	Ohio State	
8	199	Cincinnati Bengals	Joe Wilson	RB	Holy Cross	
8	200	Detroit Lions	Prentice McCray	S	Arizona State	
8	201	San Francisco 49ers	Dave Atkins	RB	UTEP	
8	202	Green Bay Packers	Hise Austin	CB	Prairie View A&M	
8	203	Detroit Lions	John Bledsoe	RB	Ohio State	from Cleveland
8	204	Dallas Cowboys	Dan Werner	QB	Michigan State	
8	205	Oakland Raiders	Mike Rae	QB	USC	
8	206	Pittsburgh Steelers	Bill Janssen	T	Nebraska	
8	207	New Orleans Saints	Doug Winslow	WR	Drake	from Washington
8	208	Miami Dolphins	Archie Pearmon	DE	N.E. Oklahoma	
9	209	Houston Oilers	Mark Williams	K	Rice	
9	210	New Orleans Saints	Mike Fink	CB	Missouri	
9	211	Philadelphia Eagles	John Nokes	LB	Northern Illinois	
9	212	New England Patriots	David Callaway	T	Texas A&M	
9	213	St. Louis Cardinals	Ken King	LB	Kentucky	
9	214	San Diego Chargers	Tab Bennett	LB	Illinois	
9	215	Buffalo Bills	Mike Reppond	WR	Arkansas	
9	216	Chicago Bears	Mike Deutsch	RB	North Dakota	
9	217	Denver Broncos	Lyle Blackwood	S	TCU	
9	218	Washington Redskins	Rick Galbos	RB	Ohio State	from Baltimore
9	219	Los Angeles Rams	Jim Nicholson	T	Michigan State	
9	220	Atlanta Falcons	Russell Ingram	C	Texas Tech	
9	221	Minnesota Vikings	Larry Dibbles	DE	New Mexico	
9	222	New York Jets	Rob Spicer	LB	Indiana	
9	223	Kansas City Chiefs	Bill Story	DT	Southern Illinois	
9	224	Cincinnati Bengals	John Dampeer	G	Notre Dame	
9	225	New York Giants	Ty Paine	QB	Washington State	
9	226	San Francisco 49ers	Roger Praetorius	RB	Syracuse	
9	227	Detroit Lions	Ira Dean	DB	Baylor	
9	228	Cleveland Browns	Curtis Wester	G	East Texas State	
9	229	Dallas Cowboys	Mike White	DB	Minnesota	
9	230	Green Bay Packers	Rick Brown	LB	South Carolina	
9	231	Oakland Raiders	Steve Sweeney	TE	California	
9	232	Pittsburgh Steelers	Bracy Bonham	G	North Carolina Central	
9	233	Washington Redskins	Eddie Sheats	LB	Kansas	
9	234	Miami Dolphins	Karl Lorch	DT	USC	
10	235	Houston Oilers	Darrell Vaughn	DT	Northern Colorado	
10	236	Minnesota Vikings	Randy Lee	DB	Tulane	from Philadelphia
10	237	New Orleans Saints	Jeff Horsley	RB	North Carolina Central	
10	238	New England Patriots	Dan Ruster	DB	Oklahoma	
10	239	San Diego Chargers	Cliff Burnett	DE	Montana	
10	240	Buffalo Bills	Matthew Reed	QB	Grambling	
10	241	Chicago Bears	William Barry	WR	Ole Miss	
10	242	St. Louis Cardinals	Bonnie Sloan	DT	Austin Peay	
10	243	New York Jets	Joe Carbone	LB	Delaware	from Baltimore
10	244	Denver Broncos	Al Marshall	WR	Boise State	
10	245	Washington Redskins	Ken Stone	S	Vanderbilt	from Los Angeles
10	246	Minnesota Vikings	Dave Mason	S	Nebraska	
10	247	New York Jets	James Krempin	T	Texas A&I	
10	248	Atlanta Falcons	Nick Mike-Mayer ^{†}	K	Temple	
10	249	Cincinnati Bengals	Lenvil Elliott	RB	Northeast Missouri	
10	250	New York Giants	Walter Love	DB	Westminster	
10	251	Kansas City Chiefs	Willie Osley	DB	Illinois	
10	252	Detroit Lions	Ray Bonner	DB	Middle Tennessee	
10	253	San Francisco 49ers	Charlie Hunt	LB	Florida State	
10	254	Dallas Cowboys	Carl Johnson	LB	Tennessee	
10	255	Green Bay Packers	Larry Allen	LB	Illinois	
10	256	Cleveland Browns	Tom Humphrey	T	Abilene Christian	
10	257	Oakland Raiders	Leo Allen	RB	Tuskegee	
10	258	Pittsburgh Steelers	Don Wunderly	DT	Arkansas	
10	259	Buffalo Bills	John LeHeup	LB	South Carolina	from Washington
10	260	Miami Dolphins	Ron Fernandes	DE	Eastern Michigan	

=== Round 11 ===
Pick #	NFL team	Player	Position	College
261	Houston Oilers	Larry Eaglin	Defensive back	Stephen F. Austin
262	New Orleans Saints	James Owens	Running back	Auburn
263	Philadelphia Eagles	Gary Van Elst	Defensive tackle	Michigan State
264	New England Patriots	Homer May	Tight end	Texas A&M
265	Buffalo Bills	Richard Earl	Tackle	Tennessee
266	Chicago Bears	Ed Siegler	Kicker	Clemson
267	St. Louis Cardinals	Dan Sanspree	Defensive end	Auburn
268	San Diego Chargers	Jay Douglas	Center	Memphis State
269	Denver Broncos	Elton Brown	Defensive end	Utah State
270	Baltimore Colts	Dan Neal	Center	Kentucky
271	Los Angeles Rams	Jeff Inmon	Running back	North Carolina Central
272	New York Jets	David Knight	Wide receiver	William & Mary
273	Atlanta Falcons	Byron Buelow	Defensive back	Lacrosse
274	Minnesota Vikings	Geary Murdock	Guard	Iowa State
275	New York Giants	William Wideman	Defensive tackle	North Carolina A&T
276	Kansas City Chiefs	Monroe Eley	Running back	Arizona State
277	Cincinnati Bengals	William Montgomery	Defensive back	Morehouse (Ga)
278	San Francisco 49ers	Tom Dahlberg	Running back	Gustavus Adolphus
279	Detroit Lions	Scott Freeman	Wide receiver	Wyoming
280	Green Bay Packers	Phil Engle	Defensive tackle	South Dakota State
281	Cleveland Browns	Carl Barisich	Defensive tackle	Princeton
282	Dallas Cowboys	Gerald Caswell	Guard	Colorado State
283	Oakland Raiders	Jerry List	Running back	Nebraska
284	Pittsburgh Steelers	Bob White	Defensive back	Arizona
285	Los Angeles Rams	Willie Jackson	Wide receiver	Florida
286	Miami Dolphins	Chris Kete	Center	Boston University

=== Round 12 ===
Pick #	NFL team	Player	Position	College
287	Houston Oilers	Brad Lyman	Wide receiver	UCLA
288	Philadelphia Eagles	Joe Lavender	Cornerback	San Diego State
289	New Orleans Saints	Paul Orndorff	Running back	Tampa
290	New England Patriots	Bruce Barnes	Punter	UCLA
291	Chicago Bears	Mike Griffin	Guard	Arkansas
292	St. Louis Cardinals	Dean Unruh	Tackle	Oklahoma
293	San Diego Chargers	Lynn Ahrens	Tackle	Eastern Montana
294	Buffalo Bills	Ronnie Carroll	Defensive tackle	Sam Houston State
295	Baltimore Colts	Bernard Thomas	Defensive end	Western Michigan
296	Denver Broncos	Jim O'Malley	Linebacker	Notre Dame
297	Los Angeles Rams	Robert Storck	Defensive tackle	Wisconsin
298	Atlanta Falcons	Mike Samples	Linebacker	Drake
299	Minnesota Vikings	Alan Spencer	Wide receiver	Pittsburg (KS)
300	New York Jets	Garry Puetz	Tackle	Valparaiso
301	Kansas City Chiefs	Tom Ramsey	Defensive tackle	Northern Arizona
302	Cincinnati Bengals	Charles "Boobie" Clark	Running back	Bethune-Cookman
303	New York Giants	Ron Lumpkin	Defensive back	Arizona State
304	Detroit Lions	Tom Scott	Wide receiver	Washington
305	San Francisco 49ers	Larry Pettus	Tackle	Tennessee State
306	Cleveland Browns	Stan Simmons	Tight end	Lewis & Clark
307	Dallas Cowboys	Jim Arneson	Guard	Arizona
308	Green Bay Packers	Larry McCarren	Center	Illinois
309	Oakland Raiders	Jim Krapf	Guard	Alabama
310	Pittsburgh Steelers	Willie Lee	Running back	Indiana State
311	Washington Redskins	Ernie Webster	Guard	Pittsburgh
312	Miami Dolphins	Mike Mullen	Linebacker	Tulane

=== Round 13 ===
Pick #	NFL team	Player	Position	College
313	Houston Oilers	Willie Martin	Guard	N.E. Oklahoma
314	New Orleans Saints	Richard Watkins	Defensive tackle	Weber State
315	Philadelphia Eagles	Stan Davis	Wide receiver	Memphis State
316	New England Patriots	Alan Lowry	Defensive back	Texas
317	St. Louis Cardinals	Edward Robinson	Defensive back	Lamar
318	San Diego Chargers	Alfred Reese	Running back	Tennessee State
319	Denver Broncos	Ed Smith	Defensive end	Colorado College
320	Chicago Bears	John Cieszkowski	Running back	Notre Dame
321	Denver Broncos	Ed White	Running back	Tulsa
322	Baltimore Colts	Tom Pierantozzi	Quarterback	West Chester
323	Los Angeles Rams	Rod Milburn	Wide receiver	Southern
324	Minnesota Vikings	Ron Just	Guard	Minot
325	New York Jets	Robert Parrish	Defensive tackle	Duke
326	Atlanta Falcons	Chris Stecher	Tackle	Claremont-Mudd
327	Cincinnati Bengals	Brooks West	Defensive tackle	Texas-El Paso
328	New York Giants	Clifton Davis	Running back	Alcorn A&M
329	Kansas City Chiefs	Paul Metallo	Defensive back	Massachusetts
330	San Francisco 49ers	Alan Kelso	Center	Washington
331	Detroit Lions	John Moss	Linebacker	Pittsburgh
332	Dallas Cowboys	John Smith	Wide receiver	UCLA
333	Green Bay Packers	Tim Alderson	Defensive back	Minnesota
334	Cleveland Browns	Jim Romaniszyn	Linebacker	Edinboro
335	Los Angeles Rams	Clinton Spearman	Linebacker	Michigan
336	Pittsburgh Steelers	Rick Fergerson	Wide receiver	Kansas State
337	Washington Redskins	Dennis Johnson	Defensive tackle	Delaware
338	Miami Dolphins	Joe Booker	Running back	Miami (OH)

=== Round 14 ===
Pick #	NFL team	Player	Position	College
339	Houston Oilers	Ron Lou	Center	Arizona State
340	Philadelphia Eagles	Ralph Sacra	Tackle	Texas A&M
341	New Orleans Saints	Paul Fersen	Tackle	Georgia
342	New England Patriots	Ray Hamilton	Defensive End	Oklahoma
343	San Diego Chargers	Tony Adams	Quarterback	Utah State
344	Buffalo Bills	Merv Krakau	Linebacker	Iowa State
345	Chicago Bears	Dave Juenger	Wide receiver	Ohio
346	St. Louis Cardinals	Dan Peiffer	Guard	Southeast Missouri State
347	Baltimore Colts	Ed Williams	Running back	West Virginia
348	Denver Broncos	John Hufnagel	Quarterback	Penn State
349	Los Angeles Rams	Walter Rhone	Defensive back	Central Missouri
350	New York Jets	Joe Schwartz	Running back	Toledo
351	Atlanta Falcons	John Madeya	Quarterback	Louisville
352	Minnesota Vikings	Eddie Bishop	Defensive back	Southern
353	New York Giants	Brian Kelley	Linebacker	Cal Lutheran
354	Kansas City Chiefs	Albert White	Wide receiver	Ft. Valley State
355	Cincinnati Bengals	Hurles Scales	Defensive back	North Texas State
356	Detroit Lions	Jay Corey	Tackle	Santa Clara
357	San Francisco 49ers	Dennis Morrison	Quarterback	Kansas State
358	Green Bay Packers	James Anderson	Defensive tackle	Northwestern
359	Cleveland Browns	Robert Popelka	Defensive back	Southern Methodist
360	Dallas Cowboys	Bob Thornton	Guard	North Carolina
361	Oakland Raiders	Bruce Polen	Defensive back	William Penn
362	Pittsburgh Steelers	Roger Cowan	Defensive end	Stanford
363	Washington Redskins	Herb Marshall	Defensive back	Cameron
364	Miami Dolphins	Greg Boyd	Running back	Arizona

=== Round 15 ===
Pick #	NFL team	Player	Position	College
365	Houston Oilers	Roger Goree	Linebacker	Baylor
366	New Orleans Saints	Mike Evenson	Center	North Dakota State
367	Philadelphia Eagles	Ken Schlezes	Defensive back	Notre Dame
368	New England Patriots	Condie Pugh	Running back	Norfolk State
369	Buffalo Bills	Joe Rizzo	Linebacker	Kings Point
370	Chicago Bears	Don Rives	Linebacker	Texas Tech
371	St. Louis Cardinals	Melvin Parker	Linebacker	Duke
372	San Diego Chargers	Gary Parris	Tight end	Florida State
373	Denver Broncos	Calvin Jones	Defensive back	Washington
374	Baltimore Colts	Jackie Brown	Defensive back	South Carolina
375	Los Angeles Rams	Jerry Bond	Defensive back	Weber State
376	Atlanta Falcons	Thomas Gage	Defensive back	Lamar
377	Minnesota Vikings	Tony Chandler	Running back	Missouri Valley
378	New York Jets	Mahlon Williams	Tight end	North Carolina State
379	Buffalo Bills	Vince O'Neil	Running back	Kansas
380	Cincinnati Bengals	Ted McNulty	Quarterback	Indiana
381	New York Giants	Carl Schaukowitch	Guard	Penn State
382	San Francisco 49ers	Mike Bettiga	Wide receiver	Humboldt State
383	San Francisco 49ers	Dan Hansen	Defensive back	BYU
384	Cleveland Browns	Dave Sullivan	Wide receiver	Virginia
385	Dallas Cowboys	Walt Baisy	Linebacker	Grambling
386	Green Bay Packers	Reggie Echols	Wide receiver	UCLA
387	Oakland Raiders	Dave Leffers	Center	Vanderbilt
388	Pittsburgh Steelers	Charles Cross	Defensive back	Iowa
389	Miami Dolphins	Bill Palmer	Tight end	St. Thomas
390	Los Angeles Rams	Curt Matter	Defensive end	Washington

=== Round 16 ===
Pick #	NFL team	Player	Position	College
391	Houston Oilers	Tim Dameron	Wide receiver	East Carolina
392	Philadelphia Eagles	Frank Dowsing	Defensive back	Mississippi State
393	New Orleans Saints	Howard Stevens	Running back	Louisville
394	New England Patriots	Mike Kutter	Defensive end	Concordia (Moorhead)
395	Chicago Bears	Bill Hart	Center	Michigan
396	St. Louis Cardinals	Jim Hann	Linebacker	Montana
397	San Diego Chargers	Joe Petty	Defensive back	Arizona State
398	Denver Broncos	Oliver Ross	Running back	Alabama A&M
399	Baltimore Colts	Marty Januszkiewicz	Running back	Syracuse
400	Denver Broncos	Ken Muhlbeier	Center	Idaho
401	Los Angeles Rams	Fuller Cherry	Defensive back	Arkansas-Monticello
402	Minnesota Vikings	Larry Smiley	Defensive end	Texas Southern
403	New York Jets	John Czerwinski	Tackle	Bowling Green
404	Atlanta Falcons	Rufus Ferguson	Running back	Wisconsin
405	Cincinnati Bengals	Harry Unger	Running back	Auburn
406	New York Giants	Ben Nitka	Kicker	Colorado College
407	Kansas City Chiefs	Wilbur Grooms	Linebacker	Tampa
408	Detroit Lions	Larry Nickels	Wide receiver	Dayton
409	San Francisco 49ers	Mike Oven	Tight end	Georgia Tech
410	Dallas Cowboys	John Conley	Tight end	Hawaii
411	Green Bay Packers	Keith Pretty	Tight end	Western Michigan
412	Cleveland Browns	George Greenfield	Running back	Murray State
413	Oakland Raiders	Jerry Gadlin	Wide receiver	Wyoming
414	Pittsburgh Steelers	Glen Nardi	Defensive tackle	Navy
415	Washington Redskins	Mike Wedman	Kicker	Colorado
416	Miami Dolphins	James Jackson	Defensive end	Norfolk State

=== Round 17 ===
Pick #	NFL team	Player	Position	College
417	Houston Oilers	Randy Braband	Linebacker	Texas
418	New Orleans Saints	Bobby Garner	Tight end	Winston-Salem
419	Philadelphia Eagles	Greg Oliver	Running back	Trinity
420	New England Patriots	Eddie McAshan	Quarterback	Georgia Tech
421	St. Louis Cardinals	Eric Crone	Quarterback	Harvard
422	San Diego Chargers	Barry Darrow	Tackle	Montana
423	Buffalo Bills	John Stearns	Defensive back	Colorado
424	Chicago Bears	Larry Roach	Defensive back	Oklahoma
425	Denver Broncos	Kenneth Morgan	Tight end	Elon
426	Baltimore Colts	Guy Falkenhagen	Tackle	Northern Michigan
427	Los Angeles Rams	Fred Henry	Running back	New Mexico
428	Atlanta Falcons	Jim Hodge	Wide receiver	Arkansas
429	Minnesota Vikings	Dave Winfield	Tight end	Minnesota
430	New York Giants	John Billizon	Defensive end	Grambling State
431	Kansas City Chiefs	Clayton Korver	Tight end	Southern Methodist
432	New York Jets	Jim Foote	Punter	Delaware Valley
433	Cincinnati Bengals	Wayne Estabrook	Quarterback	Whittier
434	San Francisco 49ers	Bob Erickson	Guard	North Dakota State
435	Detroit Lions	Earl Belgrave	Tackle	Ohio State
436	Green Bay Packers	Harold Sampson	Defensive tackle	Southern
437	Cleveland Browns	Robert McClowry	Center	Michigan State
438	Dallas Cowboys	Leslie Strayhorn	Running back	East Carolina
439	Oakland Raiders	Michael Ryan	Guard	USC
440	Pittsburgh Steelers	Mike Shannon	Defensive tackle	Oregon State
441	Washington Redskins	Jeff Davis	Running back	Mars Hill
442	Miami Dolphins	Charlie Wade	Wide receiver	Tennessee State

== Hall of Famers ==
- John Hannah, guard from Alabama, taken 1st round 4th overall by New England Patriots

Inducted: Professional Football Hall of Fame class of 1991.

- Dan Fouts, quarterback from Oregon, taken 3rd round 64th overall by San Diego Chargers

Inducted: Professional Football Hall of Fame class of 1993.

- Joe DeLamielleure, guard from Michigan State, taken 1st round 26th overall by Buffalo Bills

Inducted: Professional Football Hall of Fame class of 2003.

- Ray Guy, punter from Southern Mississippi, taken 1st round 23rd overall by Oakland Raiders

Inducted: Professional Football Hall of Fame class of 2014.

- Drew Pearson, wide receiver from Tulsa, undrafted and signed by Dallas Cowboys

Inducted: Professional Football Hall of Fame Class of 2021.

== Notable undrafted players ==
^{†}	= Pro Bowler	^{‡}	Hall of Famer

Original NFL team	Player	Pos.	College	Notes
Atlanta Falcons	Rolland Lawrence ^{†}	CB	Tabor	
Baltimore Colts	Brian Herosian	S	UConn	
Baltimore Colts	Michael Kaczmarek	LB	Southern Illinois	
Baltimore Colts	Bill Troup	QB	South Carolina	
Buffalo Bills	David Beverly	P	Auburn	
Chicago Bears	Reggie Sanderson	RB	Stanford	
Cincinnati Bengals	Ed Williams	FB	Langston	
Dallas Cowboys	Chris Gartner	K	Indiana	
Dallas Cowboys	Mike Gibbons	T	Southwestern State	
Dallas Cowboys	Drew Pearson^{‡}^{†}	WR	Tulsa	
Dallas Cowboys	Larry Robinson	RB	Tennessee	
Detroit Lions	Gary Danielson	QB	Purdue	
Kansas City Chiefs	Bill Ellenbogen	T	Virginia Tech	
Kansas City Chiefs	Ron Mabra	DB	Howard	
Los Angeles Rams	Rick Kay	LB	Colorado	
Los Angeles Rams	Rob Scribner	RB	UCLA	
Los Angeles Rams	Charlie Smith	WR	Grambling State	
Miami Dolphins	Mike Burke	P	Miami (FL)	
Miami Dolphins	Joe Washington	RB	Illinois State	
New England Patriots	Jerry Broadnax	TE	Southern	
New England Patriots	Bill Donckers	QB	San Diego State	
New Orleans Saints	Elex Price	DT	Alcorn State	
New York Jets	Bill Demory	QB	Arizona	
Pittsburgh Steelers	Lee Nystrom	C	Macalester	
St. Louis Cardinals	Clarence Duren	S	California	
St. Louis Cardinals	Pat Leahy ^{†}	K	Saint Louis	Did not play college football. Played soccer at Saint Louis and was a member of national championship teams in 1969, 1970 and 1972.
San Diego Chargers	Al Dennis	G	Grambling State	
San Diego Chargers	Steve Schubert	WR	UMass	
San Diego Chargers	Ray Wersching	K	California	
