= 1973 Los Angeles Rams season =

NFL team 36th season

- Owner: Carroll Rosenbloom
- Head coach: Chuck Knox
- Home stadium: Los Angeles Memorial Coliseum

Results
- Record: 12–2
- Division place: 1st NFC West
- Playoffs: Lost Divisional Playoffs (at Cowboys) 16–27

Uniform
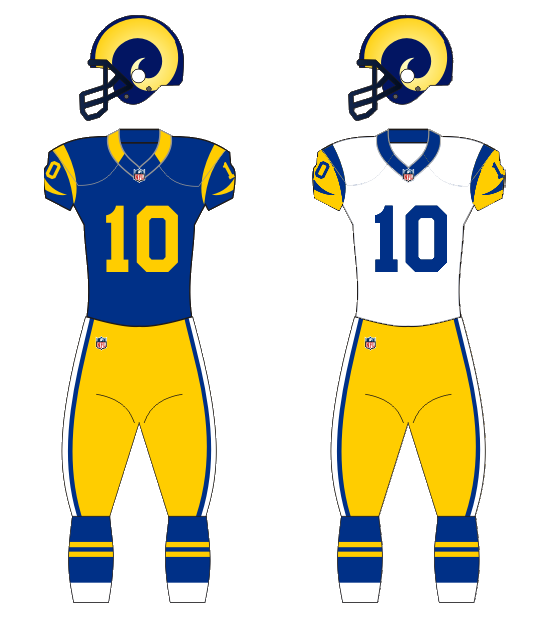

The 1973 Los Angeles Rams season was the team's 36th year with the National Football League and the 28th season in Los Angeles. The Rams were 7–0 at home for the first time since 1945. On the road, the Rams were 5–2.

The Rams donned new uniforms, which remained in use until 1994, their final season in Los Angeles, and though they moved to St. Louis in 1995, the uniform tradition continued until 1999, where they won Super Bowl XXXIV, and wore them for Super Bowl LIII. Among these changes, the Rams converted from white helmet horns to yellow helmet horns. The uniforms would return for their home games in 2018 and 2019.

The Rams finished the season with a 12–2 record and won the NFC West and appeared in the playoffs for the first time in the post-merger era. However, in their first post-merger playoff game, they lost to the Dallas Cowboys 27–16. This was the first of seven straight division titles for the Rams spanning from 1973 to 1979.

== Offseason ==
=== NFL draft ===
= Made roster
= Pro Bowler	= Hall of Famer

1973 Los Angeles Rams draft
Round	Pick	Player	Position	College	Notes
1	11	Pick Traded to the New England Patriots			Rams #1 Pick sent to Patriots as part of trade for Defensive end Fred Dryer
2	31	Cullen Bryant	RB	Colorado	Chargers #2 Pick acquired for Deacon Jones, Greg Wojic and Lee White
2	37	Ron Jaworski	QB	Youngstown State	
2	42	Jim Youngblood	LB	Tennessee Tech	Chiefs #2 Pick acquired for Willie Ellison
3	60	Tim Stokes	T	Oregon	#3 pick from Chargers in D. Jones deal.
4	95	Eddie McMillan	CB	Florida State	#4 Pick acquired from Chiefs for Pete Beathard
5	115	Cody Jones	DE	San Jose State	_{Released in 1973 preseason; would make roster in 1974 season}
5	129	Steve Jones	RB	Duke	
6	133	Jim Peterson	LB	San Diego State	
6	141	Jason Caldwell	WR	North Carolina Central	
7	161	Steve Brown	LB	Oregon State Beavers	
7	167	Bill DuLac	G	Eastern Michigan	
9	219	Jim Nicholson	T	Michigan State	
11	271	Jeff Inmon	RB	North Carolina Central	
11	285	Willie Jackson	WR	Florida	
12	297	Robert Storck	DT	Wisconsin	
13	323	Rod Milburn	WR	Southern	
13	335	Clint Spearman	LB	Michigan	
14	349	Walter Rhone	DB	Central Missouri	
15	375	Jerry Bond	DB	Weber State	
16	393	Kurt Matter	DE	Washington	
16	401	Fuller Cherry	DB	Arkansas–Monticello	
17	427	Fred Henry	RB	New Mexico	

== Personnel ==
=== Staff / Coaches ===
1973 Los Angeles Rams staff
Front Office: Owner – Carroll Rosenbloom; President / General Manager – Don Klosterman; Coaching Staff: Head coach - Chuck Knox; Offensive Coaches: Offensive Coordinator - Ken Meyer; Offensive Backs - Dick Vermeil; Offensive Line - Ray Prochaska; Receivers Coach - Leeman Bennett	Defensive Coaches: Defensive Coordinator - Ray Malavasi; Linebackers - Tom Catlin; Special Teams Coaches: Special Teams - Dick Vermeil; Strength and Conditioning: None - N/A; Other Assistant Coaches: Training Assistant - Garrett Giemont; Advance Scott - Jack Faulkner

=== Roster ===
1973 Los Angeles Rams roster
Quarterbacks (QB): 21 John Hadl; 11 James Harris; Running backs (RB): 35 Tony Baker; 45 Jim Bertelsen; 34 Les Josephson; 30 Lawrence McCutcheon; 33 Rob Scribner; 38 Larry Smith; Wide receivers (WR): 29 Harold Jackson; 86 Rod Sherman; 84 Jack Snow; Tight ends (TE): 88 Pat Curran; 80 Bob Klein	Offensive linemen (OL): 73 Charley Cowan T; 50 Ken Iman C; 65 Tom Mack G; 61 Rich Saul C/G; 79 Harry Schuh T; 71 Joe Scibelli G; 75 John Williams T; Defensive linemen (DL): 90 Larry Brooks DT; 89 Fred Dryer DE; 67 Bill Nelson DT; 74 Merlin Olsen DT; 72 Phil Olsen DT; 85 Jack Youngblood DE	Linebackers (LB): 36 Ken Geddes OLB; 52 Rick Kay OLB; 64 Jack Reynolds MLB; 58 Isiah Robertson OLB; 66 Bob Stein OLB; 59 Jim Youngblood MLB; Defensive backs (DB): 44 Al Clark CB; 37 Bill Drake FS; 42 Dave Elmendorf SS; 41 Eddie McMillan CB; 20 Steve Preece FS; 47 Charlie Stukes CB; Special teams (ST): 10 David Chapple P; 27 David Ray K	Practice squad: 60 Hank Allison G; 16 Ron Jaworski QB; 76 Cody Jones DE/DT; -- Don Maynard WR; 83 Terry Nelson TE; 77 Jim Nicholson T; 82 Joe Sweet WR; Reserve: 32 Cullen Bryant RB (IR); 24 Jason Caldwell WR (IR); 46 Leon Garror CB (IR); 87 Jim Peterson LB (IR); 13 Lance Rentzel WR (Susp.); 70 Tim Stokes T (IR); Rookies in italics

== Regular season ==
=== Schedule ===
Week	Date	Opponent	Result	Record	Venue	Attendance
1	September 16	at Kansas City Chiefs	**W** 23–13	1–0	Arrowhead Stadium	62,315
2	September 23	**Atlanta Falcons**	**W** 31–0	2–0	Los Angeles Memorial Coliseum	61,197
3	September 30	at **San Francisco 49ers**	**W** 40–20	3–0	Candlestick Park	57,487
4	October 7	at Houston Oilers	**W** 31–26	4–0	Houston Astrodome	34,875
5	October 14	Dallas Cowboys	**W** 37–31	5–0	Los Angeles Memorial Coliseum	81,428
6	October 21	Green Bay Packers	**W** 24–7	6–0	Los Angeles Memorial Coliseum	80,558
7	October 28	at Minnesota Vikings	**L** 9–10	6–1	Metropolitan Stadium	47,787
8	November 4	at **Atlanta Falcons**	**L** 13–15	6–2	Atlanta Stadium	55,837
9	November 11	**New Orleans Saints**	**W** 29–7	7–2	Los Angeles Memorial Coliseum	70,358
10	November 18	**San Francisco 49ers**	**W** 31–13	8–2	Los Angeles Memorial Coliseum	78,358
11	November 25	at **New Orleans Saints**	**W** 24–13	9–2	Tulane Stadium	67,192
12	December 2	at Chicago Bears	**W** 26–0	10–2	Soldier Field	47,620
13	December 10	New York Giants	**W** 40–6	11–2	Los Angeles Memorial Coliseum	73,328
14	December 16	Cleveland Browns	**W** 30–17	12–2	Los Angeles Memorial Coliseum	73,948
Note: Intra-division opponents are in **bold** text.

=== Game summaries ===
==== Week 6 ====
	1	2	3	4	Total
Packers	0	0	7	0	**7**
**Rams**	0	10	3	11	**24**

Newly acquired quarterback John Hadl, the NFC Player of the Year in 1973, and a stingy Los Angeles defense led the 6–0 Rams to a 10–0 lead in the first half on the way to a 24–7 victory over the 2–2–2 Green Bay Packers. After a scoreless first quarter, the Rams took the lead on kicker David Ray's 44-yard field goal. The next score came on a 46-yard touchdown pass from Hadl to former Eagles wide receiver Harold Jackson. Green Bay cut the deficit to 10–7 on wide receiver Barry Smith's 23-yard touchdown catch from MacArthur Lane on a halfback option pass.

Los Angeles gained momentum in the third quarter on a 40-yard field goal by David Ray. A 1-yard touchdown run by running back Larry Smith in the fourth quarter put the Rams ahead 20–7. Later in the game, the Packers found themselves deep in their own territory. Moments later, Dryer came storming in from the right side of the defense and chased down Green Bay quarterback Scott Hunter, dropping him in the end zone for a safety. On the Packers' following possession near their own goal line, Dryer attacked again. He looped through the middle of the Packers' offensive line and dragged backup quarterback Jim Del Gaizo down for his second safety of the game, setting a new NFL record.

For his efforts, Dryer was named the Associated Press NFL Defensive Player of the Week.

==== Week 12 ====
Team	1	2	3	4	Total
• Rams	10	3	0	13	26
Bears	0	0	0	0	0

- Date: December 2
- Location: Soldier Field, Chicago
- Game start: 1:00 p.m.
- Game weather: 45 °F (7 °C), wind 16 mph (26 km/h)

Scoring summary
1	LA	David Ray 30 yard field goal	Rams 3–0
1	LA	Jim Bertelsen 3 yard run (David Ray kick)	Rams 10–0
2	LA	David Ray 16 yard field goal	Rams 13–0
4	LA	David Ray 39 yard field goal	Rams 16–0
4	LA	David Ray 26 yard field goal	Rams 19–0
4	LA	Les Josephson 9 yard run (David Ray kick)	Rams 26–0

=== Playoffs ===
Week	Date	Opponent	Result	Attendance
Divisional	December 23, 1973	at Dallas Cowboys	L 27–16	64,291

=== Standings ===
NFC West
	W	L	T	PCT	DIV	CONF	PF	PA	STK
Los Angeles Rams	12	2	0	.857	5–1	9–2	388	178	W6
Atlanta Falcons	9	5	0	.643	4–2	7–4	318	224	W1
San Francisco 49ers	5	9	0	.357	2–4	4–7	262	319	L2
New Orleans Saints	5	9	0	.357	1–5	4–7	163	312	L1
