= Michael Fink =

Michael Fink may refer to:

- Michael Fink (footballer) (born 1982), German football manager and player
- Mike Fink (gridiron football) (born 1950), American gridiron football player
- Michael L. Fink, American visual effects artist
- Michael Fink, writer on apostasy
- Mike Fink (1770–1823), brawler and riverboat man

See also:

- Michael Fincke
