= Herb Marshall =

American gridiron football player (born 1949)

Profile
- Position: Defensive back

Personal information
- Born: August 20, 1949 (age 77); Corpus Christi, Texas, U.S.
- Listed height: 6 ft 3 in (1.91 m)
- Listed weight: 200 lb (91 kg)

Career information
- High school: Roy Miller (Corpus Christi, Texas)
- College: Cameron
- NFL draft: 1973: 14th round, 363rd overall pick

Career history
- 1973: Ottawa Rough Riders (CFL)
- 1973: Hartford Knights (ACFL)
- 1974: Detroit Wheels (WFL)
- 1974: Memphis Southmen (WFL)

Awards and highlights
- Grey Cup champion (1973)

Herbert Lenford Marshall (born August 20, 1949) is an American former professional football player who played for the Ottawa Rough Riders in the Canadian Football League (CFL), as well as the Detroit Wheels and Memphis Southmen in the World Football League (WFL).

Marshall was born in Corpus Christi, Texas, where he attended Roy Miller High School. He then played college football at Cameron University, and was selected by the Washington Redskins in the 14th round (363rd overall) of the 1973 NFL draft.
