= Bracy Bonham =

American gridiron football player (1950–2003)

Profile
- Position: Guard

Personal information
- Born: April 10, 1950; Winston-Salem, North Carolina, U.S.
- Died: October 10, 2003 (aged 53)
- Listed height: 6 ft 2 in (1.88 m)
- Listed weight: 242 lb (110 kg)

Career information
- High school: Simon G. Atkins (NC)
- College: North Carolina Central
- NFL draft: 1973: 9th round, 232nd overall pick

Career history
- Toronto Argonauts (1973); Memphis Southmen (1974–1975); Charlotte Hornets (1975)

Bracy Herman Bonham Jr. (April 10, 1950 – October 10, 2003) was an American professional football player. He played three years as an offensive guard in the Canadian Football League (CFL) and World Football League (WFL).

Bonham was born in Winston-Salem, North Carolina in 1950 and attended Simon G. Atkins High School in that city. He played college football as an offensive lineman North Carolina Central from 1969 to 1972.

He began playing professional football in the Canadian Football League in 1973 as an offensive guard for the Toronto Argonauts. He appeared in five CFL games during the 1973 season.

In 1974, he joined the World Football League, playing for the Memphis Southmen during the 1974 season. While principally playing at offensive guard, Bonham requested an opportunity to play at the fullback position and was briefly used in that role. On November 7, 1974, he scored a touchdown on six-yard run—his first touchdown since junior high school. He was traded to the Charlotte Hornets in September 1975.
