= Ben Robinson (American football) =

Former American football end

No. 87
- Position: Tight end

Personal information
- Born: January 14, 1938; Madera, California, U.S.
- Died: November 29, 2019 (aged 81)
- Listed height: 6 ft 5 in (1.96 m)
- Listed weight: 218 lb (99 kg)

Career information
- High school: Madera (CA)
- College: Stanford (1956–1957, 1959)

Benjamin Butler Robinson II (January 14, 1938 – November 29, 2019) was an American football tight end. He ranked third nationally with 595 receiving yards in 1959.

Robinson played college football for the Stanford Indians in 1956, 1957, and 1959. He missed the 1958 season due to a knee injury. He played on both offense and defense, winning a reputation as a "demon blocker, better-than-average defensive player, smart", with a tendency to drop easy passes and "catch imossible ones." As a senior in 1959, he teamed with quarterback Dick Norman and end Chris Burford to give Stanford the sport's most potent passing offense. Robinson ranked third nationally with 595 receiving yards and fifth with 34 receptions. His average of 17.5 yards per reception was the best in the Athletic Association of Western Universities.

Robinson also played for the Stanford baseball team.

Robinson signed with the Cleveland Browns in December 1959, but he did not make the team's regular-season lineup. After his football career, Robinson served in the U.S. Army as a helicopter pilot from 1960 to 1965, including flying troops into combat during the Vietnam War. He later worked as an investment advisor in Orange County, California. He died in November 2019 at age 81.
