= Tommy Campbell (American football) =

American football player (born 1949)

No. 37
- Position: Cornerback

Personal information
- Born: December 30, 1947 (age 78); New York, New York, U.S.
- Listed height: 6 ft 0 in (1.83 m)
- Listed weight: 188 lb (85 kg)

Career information
- High school: Uniondale (NY)
- College: Iowa State
- NFL draft: 1973: 7th round, 170th overall pick

Career history
- Philadelphia Eagles (1976)

Career NFL statistics
- Games played: 14
- Stats at Pro Football Reference

George Thomas Campbell (born December 30, 1947) is an American former professional football player who was a cornerback for the Philadelphia Eagles of the National Football League (NFL). He played college football for the Iowa State Cyclones.
