= Charlie Wade (American football) =

American football player (born 1950)

No. 83, 89, 84
- Position: Wide receiver

Personal information
- Born: February 23, 1950 (age 76); Nashville, Tennessee, U.S.
- Listed height: 5 ft 10 in (1.78 m)
- Listed weight: 164 lb (74 kg)

Career information
- High school: Pomeroy (OH) Meigs
- College: Tennessee State
- NFL draft: 1973: 17th round, 442nd overall pick

Career history
- Miami Dolphins (1973); Chicago Bears (1974); Green Bay Packers (1975); Kansas City Chiefs (1977)

Awards and highlights
- Super Bowl champion (VIII)

Career NFL statistics
- Receptions: 39
- Receiving yards: 683
- Receiving touchdowns: 1
- Stats at Pro Football Reference

Charlie Wade (born February 23, 1950) is an American former professional football player who was a wide receiver in the National Football League (NFL). He was selected in the 17th round of the 1973 NFL draft with the 442nd overall pick by the Miami Dolphins. He first played with the Chicago Bears the following year. He scored his lone NFL touchdown on a 57-yard reception in a 10–9 victory over the Green Bay Packers in the 1974 season. During the 1975 NFL season he played with the Green Bay Packers before spending a season away from the NFL. He played his final season with the Kansas City Chiefs.
