= Will C. Crawford High School =

Public high school in San Diego, California, United States

Crawford High School
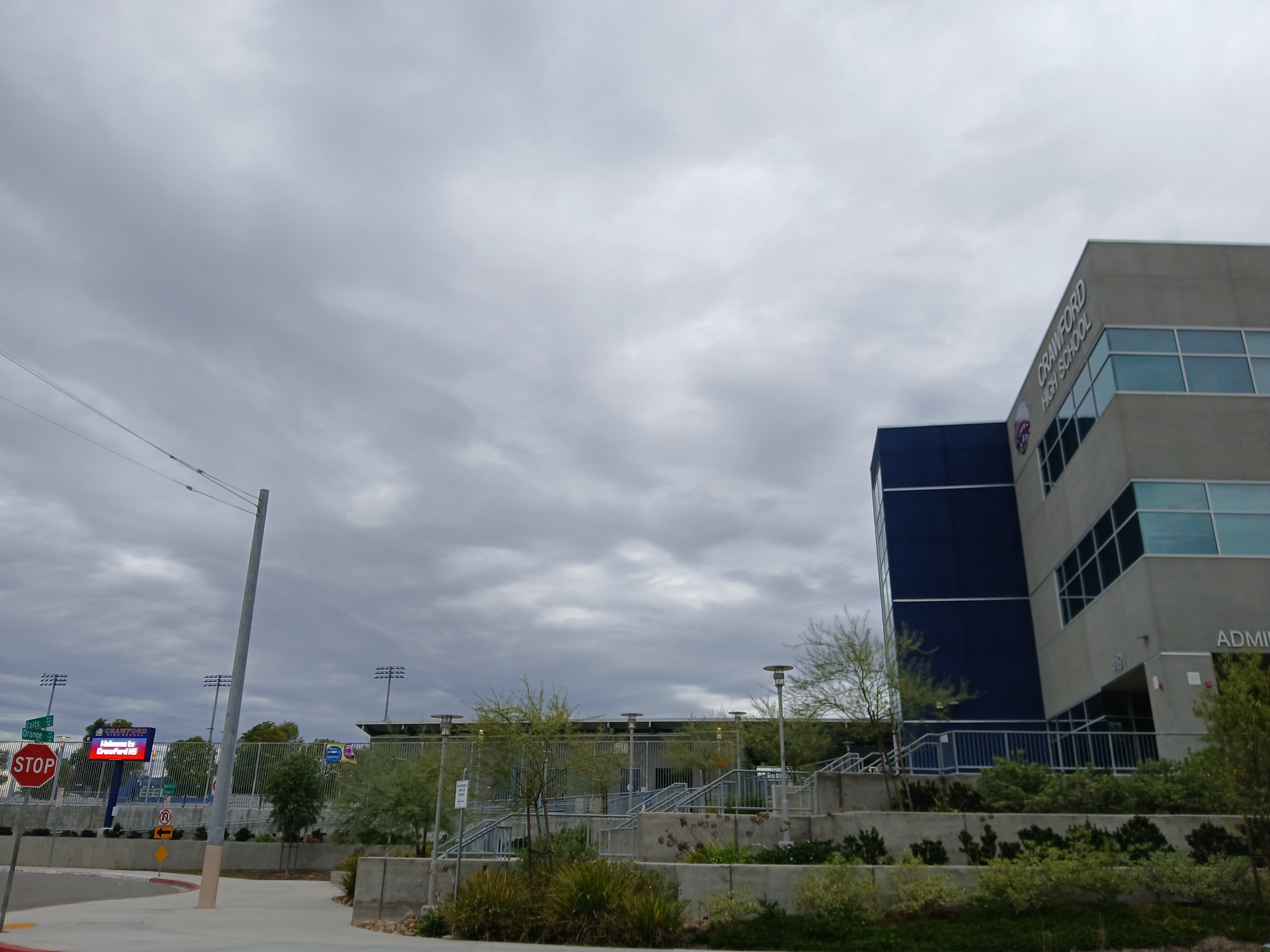

Location
- 4191 Colts Way; San Diego, California; United States; 32°45′8″N 117°4′32″W

Information
- Type: Public
- Motto: Excellence is our goal, failure is not an option!
- Established: September 10, 1957; re-established 2004
- School district: San Diego City Schools
- Teaching staff: 51.41 (FTE)
- Grades: 9–12
- Enrollment: 1,276 (2023-2024)
- Student to teacher ratio: 24.82
- Colors: Red, white, and blue
- Mascot: Colt
- Yearbook: The Centaur
- Website: crawford.sandiegounified.org

Will C. Crawford High School, also known as Crawford High School and formerly Crawford Educational Complex, is a high school in the El Cerrito neighborhood of San Diego, California, United States. In the fall of 2012, the school was reorganized as a traditional school with one principal and two vice principals, and returned to its original name, Will C. Crawford High School.

As of the 2018–19 school year, the school had an enrollment of 1,119 students and 48.54 classroom teachers (on an FTE basis), for a student–teacher ratio of 23:05:1. There were 931 students (20.19% of enrollment) eligible for free lunch and 81 (7.24% of students) eligible for reduced-cost lunch.

It is part of San Diego Unified School District. Erected in 1957 and dedicated in 1958, it is a comprehensive school serving 1,500 students in grades 9–12.

== History ==
=== Naming ===
The school was named after Will C. Crawford, Superintendent of the San Diego Unified Schools from 1934 to 1954. It was officially opened during a dedication ceremony on April 27, 1958.

=== Mascot and Colors ===
In 1957, the incoming Horace Mann Junior High School graduating 9th grade class and transfer students from Hoover High School formed the 10th and 11th grade classes (at the time, the school was 10th through 12th grade). There was no 12th grade the first year. The entire student body of Crawford High School decided on the school colors and mascot. Crimson, white and blue were chosen. The mascot was chosen in line with Dr. Crawford's other career as an Air Force pilot; the student body voted for it to be some kind of aircraft or bird. To keep with the rivalry with Hoover High School (whose mascot was the Cardinal), and because the yearbook was named Centaur, it was decided that the mascot would be the Colt. The alma mater was later written, and the Pacer newspaper was founded.

=== Crawford Educational Complex ===
Crawford High School reopened in 2004 as the Crawford Educational Complex through a grant from the Bill and Melinda Gates Foundation. It consisted of four schools within a school: the School of Law and Business (LAB), Multimedia and Visual Arts School (MVAS), Invention and Design Educational Academy (IDEA) and the School of Community Health and Medical Practices (CHAMPs). The small schools were closed due to district budget cuts, and the school returned to a comprehensive campus in the fall of 2012.

=== 50th anniversary ===
In the 2007–2008 school year, Crawford celebrated its 50th anniversary. The campus was repainted blue and crimson by the end of the school year.

The automotive department was reopened and rededicated by State Superintendent of Instruction Jack O'Connell. The department achieved NATEF (National Automotive Technician Education Foundation) certification on the one-year anniversary of its opening.

=== 2010's ===
The school established a "restorative justice" program in 2014.

=== Reconstruction ===
In 2015, San Diego Unified School District announced a modernization project, with new athletic fields and improvements at Horace Mann Middle School & Will C. Crawford High School. The project began in the 2015–2016 school year.

== Feeder schools ==
Public feeder schools include two middle schools and ten elementary schools.

Middle schools:

- Horace Mann Middle School
- Monroe Clark Middle School

Elementary schools:

- Andrew Jackson Elementary School
- Carver Elementary School
- Euclid Elementary School
- Hardy Elementary School
- Henry Clay Elementary School
- Herbert Ibarra Elementary School
- John Marshall Elementary School
- Mary Lanyon Fay Elementary School
- Oak Park Elementary School
- Rolando Park Elementary School

== Curriculum ==
Crawford High consists of a 4x4 block schedule, which means that students are able to complete four full classes a semester (fall term and spring term) totaling eight full classes a year, rather than the traditional six year-long courses. This enables students to complete a full year's curriculum in a more condensed term, allowing them to enroll in additional electives or ROP courses.

== Centaur ==
Centaur is Crawford's award-winning, nationally recognized yearbook. It derives its name, centaur, from the Greek mythological creature that is half human and half horse.

Year	Place	Best of Class
2005	1st place	Won
2007	2nd place	Won

== Sports ==
- Fall
  - Cross country
  - Football
  - Girls' golf
  - Girls' tennis
  - Girls' volleyball
- Winter
  - Boys' basketball
  - Girls' basketball
  - Wrestling
  - Boys' soccer
  - Girls' soccer
- Spring
  - Boys' golf
  - Baseball
  - Softball
  - Badminton
  - Boys' tennis
  - Boys' volleyball
  - Track

== CIF Championships ==
Sport	Title(s) won
Badminton	1990, 1991, 1992, 1993
Baseball	1962, 1964, 1965
Boys' basketball	1963, 2006
Girls' basketball	
Boys' cross country	1973, 1974, 2019
Girls' cross country	
Football	1961
Boys' golf	1965, 1967, 2010
Girls' golf	
Boys' gymnastics	1962, 1963, 1964, 1965, 1966, 1968
Girls' gymnastics	
Boys' soccer	2002, 2003
Girls' soccer	
Softball	1985
Swimming	1968, 1969, 1970, 1971, 1972
Boys' tennis	1969, 2002, 2003
Girls' tennis	
Boys' track and field	1974
Girls' track and field	1977, 1978, 1979, 1981
Boys' volleyball	
Girls' volleyball	
Boys' water polo	1970, 1971
Girls' water polo	
Wrestling	2003

== Notable alumni ==
- Carlos Amezcua, TV news anchor
- Stephen Bishop, singer, songwriter
- Nathan East (musician), bass player (Eric Clapton, Michael Jackson, George Harrison...)
- Tim Blackwell, former professional baseball player (Boston Red Sox, Philadelphia Phillies, Montreal Expos, Chicago Cubs)
- Bob Boone, former catcher and manager in Major League Baseball, four-time All-Star
- Salvatore Joseph Cordileone, Archbishop of San Francisco, former Bishop of Oakland
- Dave Duncan, Major League Baseball player (Kansas City Athletics, Oakland Athletics, Cleveland Indians, Baltimore Orioles)
- Joan Embery, wildlife and environment preservationist
- Dave Engle, former professional baseball player (Minnesota Twins, Detroit Tigers, Montreal Expos, Milwaukee Brewers)
- Ed Herrmann, former professional baseball player (Chicago White Sox, New York Yankees, California Angels, Houston Astros, Montreal Expos)
- Sherri Lightner, San Diego City council member
- Kathy Najimy, actress
- Kadir Nelson, artist, author, and illustrator
- Jim Nettles, former professional baseball player (Minnesota Twins, Detroit Tigers, Kansas City Royals, Oakland Athletics)
- Sandi Patty, Gospel singer
- Jim Peterson, professional player, National Football League
- Chuck Rainey, former professional baseball player (Boston Red Sox, Chicago Cubs, Oakland Athletics)
- Mike Stamm, Olympic swimmer, gold and silver medalist
- Yale Strom, musician, filmmaker, and writer
- Brian Teacher, professional top-10 tennis player and coach
- Jack Tempchin, songwriter, Peaceful Easy Feeling, Eagles
- Malcolm Thomas, professional basketball player for Maccabi Tel Aviv
- Warren Wiebe, singer, songwriter (Celine Dion, David Foster)
- Dick Woodson, former professional baseball player (Minnesota Twins, New York Yankees)
- Valerie Ziegenfuss, top-ranked WTA tennis player

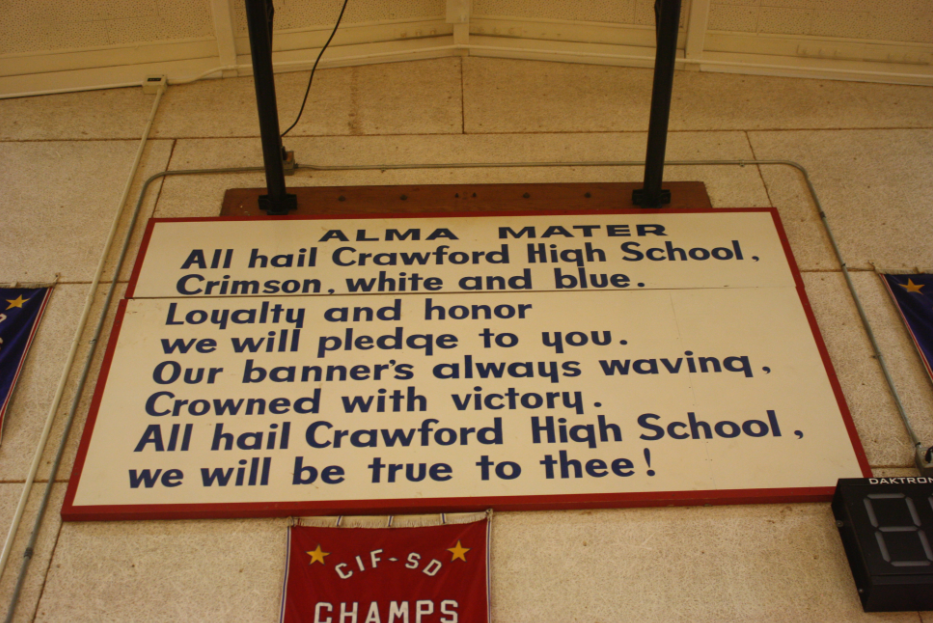
The Alma Mater as seen on the wall of CIF Championships

== See also ==
- List of high schools in San Diego County, California
- List of high schools in California
- Primary and secondary schools in San Diego, California
- San Diego Unified School District
