= Bill Story =

American football player (born 1951)

No. 62
- Position: Tackle

Personal information
- Born: November 21, 1951 (age 74); Memphis, Tennessee, U.S.
- Listed height: 6 ft 3 in (1.91 m)
- Listed weight: 245 lb (111 kg)

Career information
- High school: Melrose
- College: Southern Illinois
- NFL draft: 1973: 9th round, 223rd overall pick

Career history
- Kansas City Chiefs (1973–1975); Edmonton Eskimos (1977)*
- * Offseason or practice squad member only
- Stats at Pro Football Reference

William Frank Story (born November 21, 1951) is an American former professional football player who was a tackle for the Kansas City Chiefs of National Football League (NFL). He played college football for the Southern Illinois University Carbondale.
