= Jerry Broadnax =

American football player (born 1951)

No. 83, 82
- Position: Tight end

Personal information
- Born: August 19, 1951 (age 75); Dallas, Texas, U.S.
- Listed height: 6 ft 2 in (1.88 m)
- Listed weight: 225 lb (102 kg)

Career information
- High school: L. G. Pinkston (Dallas)
- College: Southern (1969–1972)
- NFL draft: 1973: undrafted

Career history
- New England Patriots (1973)*; Houston Oilers (1974); Chicago Winds (1975); Green Bay Packers (1976)*
- * Offseason or practice squad member only
- Stats at Pro Football Reference

Gerald Lee Broadnax (born August 19, 1951) is an American former professional football player who was a tight end for one season with the Houston Oilers of the National Football League (NFL). He played college football for the Southern Jaguars.

== Early life and college ==
Gerald Lee Broadnax was born on August 19, 1951, in Dallas, Texas. He attended L. G. Pinkston High School in Dallas. He was inducted into the Dallas Independent School District Athletic Hall of Fame in 2025.

Broadnax was a member of the Southern Jaguars of Southern University from 1969 to 1972.

== Professional career ==
After going undrafted in the 1973 NFL draft, Broadnax signed with the New England Patriots. He was released on September 14, 1973.

Broadnax was signed by the Houston Oilers in 1974. He played in eight games, starting two, for the Oilers during the 1974 season and caught three passes for 69 yards. He was released in 1974.

Broadnax signed with the Chicago Winds of the World Football League (WFL) in 1975. He played in the first three games of the 1975 WFL season before being released on August 19, 1975.

Broadnax signed with the Green Bay Packers in 1976. He was released on August 23, 1976.
