= Louis Neal =

American football player (born 1951)

No. 80
- Position: Wide receiver

Personal information
- Born: January 10, 1951 (age 75); San Francisco, California, U.S.
- Listed height: 6 ft 4 in (1.93 m)
- Listed weight: 215 lb (98 kg)

Career information
- High school: Woodrow Wilson (San Francisco)
- College: Prairie View A&M
- NFL draft: 1973: 5th round, 124th overall pick

Career history
- Atlanta Falcons (1973–1974); San Antonio Wings (1975)

Career NFL statistics
- Receptions: 13
- Receiving yards: 230
- Receiving TDs: 1
- Stats at Pro Football Reference

Louis Neal (born January 10, 1951) is an American former professional football player who was a wide receiver for the Atlanta Falcons of the National Football League (NFL) from 1973 to 1974. He played college football for the Prairie View A&M Panthers. He also played professionally for the San Antonio Wings of the World Football League in 1975.
