= Barry Darrow =

American football player (born 1950)

No. 63
- Position: Offensive tackle

Personal information
- Born: June 27, 1950 (age 76); Peoria, Illinois, U.S.
- Listed height: 6 ft 7 in (2.01 m)
- Listed weight: 260 lb (118 kg)

Career information
- High school: C.M. Russell (MT)
- College: Montana
- NFL draft: 1973: 17th round, 422nd overall pick

Career history
- Cleveland Browns (1974–1978)

Career NFL statistics
- Games played: 71
- Games started: 35
- Fumble recoveries: 3
- Stats at Pro Football Reference

Barry Wayne Darrow (born June 27, 1950) is an American former professional football player who was an offensive tackle in the National Football League (NFL). He was selected by the San Diego Chargers in the 17th round of the 1973 NFL draft. He played college football for the Montana Grizzlies.
