= George Pugh (American football) =

American footballer tight end and coach

Current position
- Title: Tight ends coach/h-backs coach/director of football operations
- Team: Miles
- Conference: SIAC

Playing career
- 1972–1975: Alabama
- Position: Tight end

Coaching career (HC unless noted)
- 1976: Columbia HS (GA) (assistant)
- 1977: Columbia HS (GA)
- 1978–1979: Chattanooga (WR)
- 1980: New Mexico (WR)
- 1981: Pittsburgh (assistant)
- 1982–1988: Texas A&M (assistant)
- 1989–1991: Alabama A&M
- 1992–1993: Selma HS (AL)
- 1994: Luverne HS (AL)
- 1995–2000: UAB (assistant)
- 2001–2002: Arkansas (assistant)
- 2003–2004: Meadowcreek HS (GA)
- 2005–2006: UAB (assistant)
- 2007: Houston (WR)
- 2008–2016: Georgia State (AHC/WR)
- 2022–present: Miles (TE/HB)

Administrative career (AD unless noted)
- 2016–2017: Memphis (director of player personnel)
- 2022–present: Miles (director of football operations)

Head coaching record
- Overall: 17–12 (college)
- Tournaments: 0–1 (NCAA D-II playoffs)

Accomplishments and honors

Championships
- As coach: 2 SIAC (1989–1990); As player: National (1973)

George Pugh is an American former football player and coach who is currently the tight ends coach, halfbacks coach and the director of football operations for the Miles Golden Bears of the Southern Intercollegiate Athletic Conference (SIAC). He served as the head football coach at Alabama A&M University from 1989 to 1991, compiling a record of 17–12. Pugh most recently served as the director of player personnel at the University of Memphis.

== Head coaching record ==
=== College ===
Year	Team	Overall	Conference	Standing	Bowl/playoffs
Alabama A&M Bulldogs (Southern Intercollegiate Athletic Conference) (1989–1991)
1989	Alabama A&M	8–4	6–0	1st	L NCAA Division II First Round
1990	Alabama A&M	6–5	6–1	1st	
1991	Alabama A&M	3–3 (Note: George Pugh was forced out after the first six games of the 1991 season. Ray Bonner replaced Pugh as head coach and led Alabama A&M to a record of 2–3 over the final five games of the season. The Bulldogs finished 5–6 overall, tying for the Southern Intercollegiate Athletic Conference title with a mark of 5–2.)	3–0		
Alabama A&M:		17–12	15–1		
Total:		17–12			
National championship Conference title Conference division title or championship game berth
