= Ed Beverly =

American football player (born 1949)

No. 81
- Position: Wide receiver

Personal information
- Born: September 27, 1949 (age 77); Harrisburg, Pennsylvania, U.S.
- Listed height: 5 ft 11 in (1.80 m)
- Listed weight: 172 lb (78 kg)

Career information
- High school: Harrisburg
- College: Arizona State
- NFL draft: 1973: 5th round, 122nd overall pick

Career history
- San Francisco 49ers (1973); Toronto Argonauts (1976)*
- * Offseason or practice squad member only
- Stats at Pro Football Reference

Edward Louis Beverly (born September 27, 1949) is an American former professional football player who was a wide receiver for the San Francisco 49ers of National Football League (NFL). He played college football for the Arizona State University.
