= Al Dennis =

American football player (born 1951)

No. 61, 62
- Position: Offensive guard

Personal information
- Born: June 24, 1951 (age 75); Independence, Louisiana, U.S.
- Listed height: 6 ft 4 in (1.93 m)
- Listed weight: 250 lb (113 kg)

Career information
- High school: Greenville Park (Hammond, Louisiana)
- College: Grambling State
- NFL draft: 1973: undrafted

Career history
- San Diego Chargers (1973); Cleveland Browns (1976–1977)

Career NFL statistics
- Games played: 31
- Stats at Pro Football Reference

Albert Rudolph Dennis III (born June 24, 1951) is an American former professional football player who was an offensive guard for three seasons in the National Football League (NFL) for the San Diego Chargers and Cleveland Browns. He played for the Chargers in 1973 and the Browns from 1976 to 1977. He played college football for the Grambling State Tigers.
