= Levi Johnson =

American football player (born 1950)

No. 23
- Position: Cornerback

Personal information
- Born: October 30, 1950 (age 76); Corpus Christi, Texas, U.S.
- Listed height: 6 ft 3 in (1.91 m)
- Listed weight: 196 lb (89 kg)

Career information
- High school: Roy Miller (TX)
- College: Texas A&I
- NFL draft: 1973: 3rd round, 75th overall pick

Career history
- Detroit Lions (1973–1978)

Awards and highlights
- First-team Little All-American (1971)

Career NFL statistics
- Interceptions: 21
- Interception yards: 549
- Fumble recoveries: 4
- Total TDs: 5
- Stats at Pro Football Reference

Levi Johnson (born October 30, 1950) is an American former professional football player who was a cornerback for five seasons with the Detroit Lions of the National Football League (NFL). He played college football for the Texas A&I Javelinas. He had 21 interceptions in less than five years as an NFL player, returning three for touchdowns.

Johnson led the Lions with five interceptions during the 1973 NFL season and the 1974 NFL season, returning two for touchdowns in 1974, including one on Thanksgiving Day against the Denver Broncos.

He added another touchdown during the 1975 NFL season against the Green Bay Packers. During the season-opener, he blocked two punts and fell on one in the end zone for the score. Teammate Larry Ball picked up Johnson's other blocked punt and returned it 34 yards for another touchdown.

Johnson had a career-high six interceptions in 1976, and was second on the team that season, one behind James Hunter. He also scored the final touchdown of his career, picking off Jim Zorn of the expansion Seattle Seahawks and returning it 70 yards for the score.

Johnson had two interceptions in the 1977 NFL season's third game, against the Philadelphia Eagles, but sustained a knee injury and never played again in the NFL.
