= Ernie Price =

American football player (born 1950)

No. 72, 62
- Position: Defensive end

Personal information
- Born: September 20, 1950; Corpus Christi, Texas, U.S.
- Died: February 5, 2004 (aged 53); Houston, Texas, U.S.
- Listed height: 6 ft 4 in (1.93 m)
- Listed weight: 248 lb (112 kg)

Career information
- High school: Roy Miller (TX)
- College: Texas A&M-Kingsville
- NFL draft: 1973: 1st round, 17th overall pick

Career history
- Detroit Lions (1973–1978); Seattle Seahawks (1978–1979)

Awards and highlights
- Second-team All-American (1972)

Career NFL statistics
- Sacks: 13
- Fumble recoveries: 7
- Safeties: 1
- Stats at Pro Football Reference

Ernest Price (September 20, 1950 – February 5, 2004) was an American professional football player who was a defensive lineman in the National Football League (NFL). He played for seven seasons for the Detroit Lions and Seattle Seahawks.
