= Jim Laslavic =

American football player (born 1951)

No. 52, 54, 60
- Position: Linebacker

Personal information
- Born: October 24, 1951 (age 75); Etna, Pennsylvania, U.S.
- Listed height: 6 ft 2 in (1.88 m)
- Listed weight: 237 lb (108 kg)

Career information
- High school: Etna
- College: Penn State
- NFL draft: 1973: 3rd round, 71st overall pick

Career history
- Detroit Lions (1973–1977); San Diego Chargers (1978–1981); Green Bay Packers (1982)

Career NFL statistics
- Sacks: 4
- Fumble recoveries: 7
- Interceptions: 8
- Stats at Pro Football Reference

Jim "Laz" Laslavic (/ˈlæzləvɪk/ LAz-lə-vik; born October 24, 1951) is an American former professional football player who was a linebacker for 10 seasons in the National Football League (NFL). He played college football for the Penn State Nittany Lions.

Laslavic is a retired sportscaster for KNSD in San Diego and a former radio announcer for KIOZ. He lives in Coronado, California, with his wife, Susan. Together, they raised two kids, Hayley (born 1986) and James (born 1988). Laslavic is a member of Phi Gamma Delta fraternity.

In 2024, he will be included in Croatian American Sports Hall of Fame.
