= Bonnie Sloan =

American football player (born 1948)

No. 67, 79
- Position: Defensive tackle

Personal information
- Born: June 1, 1948 (age 78); Lebanon, Tennessee, U.S.
- Listed height: 6 ft 5 in (1.96 m)
- Listed weight: 260 lb (118 kg)

Career information
- College: Austin Peay
- NFL draft: 1973: 10th round, 242nd overall pick

Career history
- St. Louis Cardinals (1973)

Career NFL statistics
- Games played: 4
- Games started: 0
- Stats at Pro Football Reference

Bonnie Ryan Sloan (born June 1, 1948) is an American former professional football player who was the first of three completely deaf football players in National Football League (NFL) history.

Sloan played four games at defensive tackle for the St. Louis Cardinals in the 1973 season.

A native of Lebanon, Tennessee, Sloan starred at Austin Peay State University. He was a 10th round selection (242nd overall pick) of the 1973 NFL draft by the Cardinals, who released him after that one season due to a knee injury.

Former Denver Bronco Kenny Walker followed him into the NFL, in the early 1990s; both were then followed by fullback Derrick Coleman, who last played for the Arizona Cardinals.
