= 1973 Baltimore Colts season =

21st season in franchise history

- Owner: Robert Irsay
- General manager: Joe Thomas
- Head coach: Howard Schnellenberger
- Home stadium: Memorial Stadium

Results
- Record: 4–10
- Division place: T-4th AFC East
- Playoffs: Did not qualify

The 1973 Baltimore Colts season was the 21st season for the team in the National Football League. Under first-year head coach Howard Schnellenberger, the Colts finished with a record of 4 wins and 10 losses, tied for fourth in the AFC East with the New York Jets. The Colts lost the tiebreaker to the Jets based on head-to-head sweep (0–2).

Baltimore was the only team to lose to the Houston Oilers, bowing 31–27 in week eight at home. The Oilers broke an 18-game losing streak with the victory.

Hired in February, Schnellenberger was previously the offensive coordinator with the Super Bowl champion Miami Dolphins, who went undefeated in 1972 under head coach Don Shula.

This was the first year since 1955 in which long-time quarterback Johnny Unitas was not on the Baltimore roster.

== Offseason ==
=== NFL draft ===
1973 Baltimore Colts draft
Round	Pick	Player	Position	College	Notes
1	2	Bert Jones *	Quarterback	LSU	
1	10	Joe Ehrmann *	Defensive tackle	Syracuse	
2	35	Mike Barnes *	Defensive end	Miami (FL)	
3	61	Bill Olds	Running back	Nebraska	
3	62	Jamie Rotella	Linebacker	Tennessee	
4	83	Gery Palmer	Tackle	Kansas	
4	85	Ollie Smith	Wide receiver	Tennessee State	
5	114	David Taylor	Guard	Catawba	
8	189	Ray Oldham	Defensive back	Middle Tennessee	
8	191	Bill Windauer	Guard	Iowa	
11	270	Dan Neal	Center	Kentucky	
12	295	Bernard Thomas	Defensive end	Iowa	
13	322	Tom Pierantozzi	Quarterback	West Chester	
14	347	Ed Williams	Running back	West Virginia	
15	347	Jackie Brown	Defensive back	South Carolina	
16	399	Marty Januszkiewicz	Running back	Syracuse	
17	426	Guy Falkenhagen	Tackle	Northern Michigan	
Made roster * Made at least one Pro Bowl during career

== Staff ==
1973 Baltimore Colts staff
Front office: Owner/president and treasurer – Robert Irsay; General manager – Joe Thomas; Head coaches: Head coach – Howard Schnellenberger; Offensive coaches: Receivers – Pete McCulley; Running backs - George Sefcik; Offensive coordinator/offensive line – George Young	Defensive coaches: Defensive coordinator/defensive line – Don Doll; Defensive backfield – Bobby Franklin; Linebackers coach – Ray Callahan

== Final roster ==
1973 Baltimore Colts roster
Quarterbacks (QB): 14 Marty Domres; 7 Bert Jones; Running backs (RB): 23 Don McCauley; 26 Lydell Mitchell; 38 Bill Olds; Wide receivers (WR): 35 Glenn Doughty; 17 Sam Havrilak; 28 Cotton Speyrer; Tight ends (TE): 88 John Andrews; 87 Raymond Chester; 84 Tom Mitchell	Offensive linemen (OL): 66 Elmer Collett G; 74 Tom Drougas T; 54 Fred Hoaglin C; 61 Cornelius Johnson G; 57 Ken Mendenhall C; 50 Dan Neal C; 68 Dennis Nelson T; 62 Glenn Ressler G; 64 David Taylor T; Defensive linemen (DL): 73 Richard Amman DE; 79 Jim Bailey DT; 63 Mike Barnes DE; 76 Joe Ehrmann DT; 85 Roy Hilton DE/DT; 75 Joe Schmiesing DT	Linebackers (LB): 59 Stan Cherry OLB; 32 Mike Curtis MLB; 83 Ted Hendricks OLB; 52 Michael Kaczmarek OLB; 53 Stan White OLB; Defensive backs (DB): 29 Brian Herosian FS; 44 Rex Kern CB; 40 Bruce Laird CB; 11 Jack Mildren SS; 31 Nelson Munsey CB; 25 Ray Oldham SS; 21 Rick Volk FS; Special teams (ST): 10 George Hunt K; 49 David Lee P	Practice squad: 60 Larry Christoff G; 58 Ed Mooney LB; 71 Gery Palmer T; 9 Tom Pierantozzi QB; 80 Ollie Smith WR; 65 Bill Windauer DT; Reserve: 27 Hubert Ginn RB (IR); Rookies in italics

== Regular season ==
Before the season, the Colts traded long-time quarterback Johnny Unitas to the San Diego Chargers. Unitas had been splitting quarterback duties with Earl Morrall and Marty Domres over the past few seasons; he played one season for San Diego and retired.

=== Schedule ===
Week	Date	Opponent	Result	Record	Venue	Attendance	Game recap
1	September 16	at Cleveland Browns	**L** 14–24	0–1	Cleveland Municipal Stadium	74,303	Recap
2	September 23	**New York Jets**	**L** 10–34	0–2	Memorial Stadium	55,942	Recap
3	September 30	New Orleans Saints	**W** 14–10	1–2	Memorial Stadium	52,293	Recap
4	October 7	at **New England Patriots**	**L** 16–24	1–3	Schaefer Stadium	57,044	Recap
5	October 14	at **Buffalo Bills**	**L** 13–31	1–4	Rich Stadium	78,875	Recap
6	October 21	at Detroit Lions	**W** 29–27	2–4	Tiger Stadium	48,058	Recap
7	October 28	Oakland Raiders	**L** 21–34	2–5	Memorial Stadium	59,008	Recap
8	November 4	Houston Oilers	**L** 27–31	2–6	Memorial Stadium	52,707	Recap
9	November 11	at **Miami Dolphins**	**L** 0–44	2–7	Orange Bowl	60,332	Recap
10	November 18	at Washington Redskins	**L** 14–22	2–8	RFK Stadium	52,675	Recap
11	November 25	**Buffalo Bills**	**L** 17–24	2–9	Memorial Stadium	52,250	Recap
12	December 2	at **New York Jets**	**L** 17–20	2–10	Shea Stadium	51,167	Recap
13	December 9	**Miami Dolphins**	**W** 16–3	3–10	Memorial Stadium	58,446	Recap
14	December 16	**New England Patriots**	**W** 18–13	4–10	Memorial Stadium	52,065	Recap
Note: Intra-division opponents are in **bold** text.

=== Standings ===
AFC East
	W	L	T	PCT	DIV	CONF	PF	PA	STK
Miami Dolphins	12	2	0	.857	7–1	9–2	343	150	W1
Buffalo Bills	9	5	0	.643	6–2	7–4	259	230	W4
New England Patriots	5	9	0	.357	1–7	3–8	258	300	L2
New York Jets	4	10	0	.286	4–4	4–7	240	306	L2
Baltimore Colts	4	10	0	.286	2–6	2–9	226	341	W2

== See also ==
- History of the Indianapolis Colts
- Indianapolis Colts seasons
- Colts–Patriots rivalry
