= John "Tiny" Andrews =

American football player (1951–2015)

John Andrews
No. 70
- Positions: Defensive end, defensive tackle

Personal information
- Born: November 7, 1951; Detroit, Michigan, U.S.
- Died: June 5, 2015 (aged 63)
- Listed height: 6 ft 5 in (1.96 m)
- Listed weight: 251 lb (114 kg)

Career information
- High school: Mumford (Detroit)
- College: Morgan State
- NFL draft: 1973: 7th round, 175th overall pick

Career history
- Miami Dolphins (1975–1976)

Career NFL statistics
- Sacks: 3.5
- Fumble recoveries: 4
- Stats at Pro Football Reference

John Vanderbilt "Tiny" Andrews (November 7, 1951 – June 5, 2015) was an American professional football defensive tackle in the National Football League (NFL) for the Miami Dolphins and played college football at Morgan State College

== Background ==
Andrews was born in Detroit, Michigan, to Magdalene Lewis Andrews and John Andrews Sr. He attended the public schools there and played on the Mumford High School football team. In 1969, after he graduated from Mumford High he matriculated to Morgan State College, where he played four years of varsity football and earned his Bachelor of Science degree in 1973.

== In the NFL ==
Andrews was drafted by the Detroit Lions in the 7th round (175th overall) of the 1973 NFL draft. However, he was cut by the Lions and in 1975 signed a contract with the Miami Dolphins where he played in 28 games and was a starter in 2 games.

== Personal life and death ==
After his brief football career, Andrews moved to Baltimore, where he had attended college. He entered the ministry and spent much of his time working with troubled youth. Andrews once took a group of African American Boy Scouts on a month long trip to Australia. He moved back to his hometown of Detroit. He died on June 5, 2015, and is interred at the Gethsemane Cemetery in Detroit.
