= Steve Baumgartner =

American football player (born 1951)

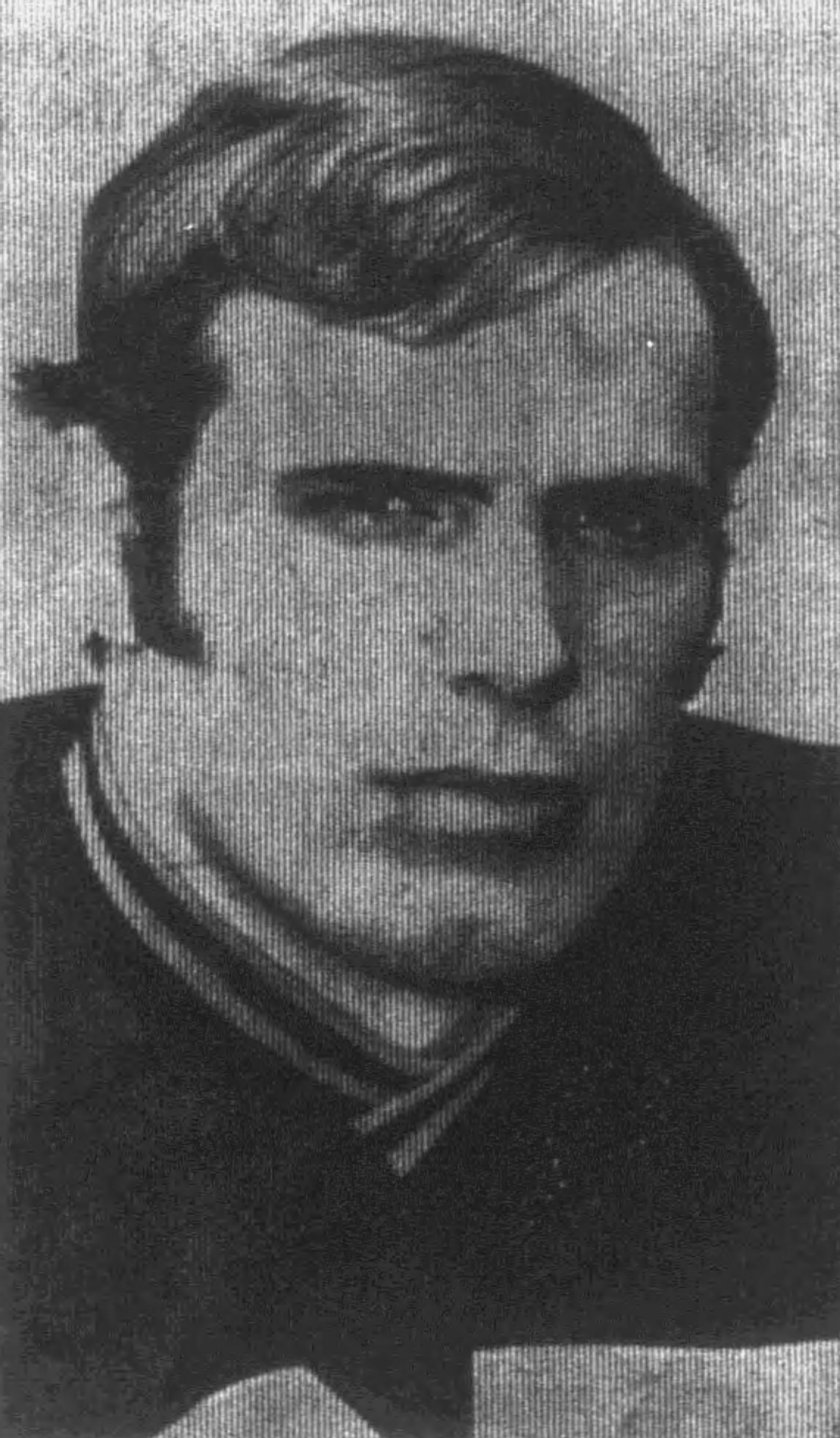
- Baumgartner c. 1971

No. 63
- Positions: Defensive end, linebacker

Personal information
- Born: March 26, 1951 (age 75); Chicago, Illinois, U.S.
- Listed height: 6 ft 7 in (2.01 m)
- Listed weight: 256 lb (116 kg)

Career information
- High school: Benet Academy (Lisle, Illinois)
- College: Purdue (1969–1972)
- NFL draft: 1973: 2nd round, 51st overall pick

Career history
- New Orleans Saints (1973–1977); Houston Oilers (1977–1979)

Awards and highlights
- First-team All-Big Ten (1972)

Career NFL statistics
- Games played: 95
- Games started: 27
- Sacks: 5.5
- Fumble recoveries: 7
- Stats at Pro Football Reference

Steven John Baumgartner (born March 26, 1951) is an American former professional football player who was a defensive end and linebacker in the National Football League (NFL). He played college football for the Purdue Boilermakers, and was selected by the New Orleans Saints in the second round of the 1973 NFL draft. He played for the Saints from 1973 to 1977 and for the Houston Oilers from 1977 to 1979. Baumgartner also had an unusual hobby as a beer can collector.

== Early life ==
Steven John Baumgartner was born on March 26, 1951, in Chicago, Illinois. He played high school football at Benet Academy in Lisle, Illinois, as a defensive end. As a senior in 1968, he earned All-Suburban Catholic Conference honors.

== College career ==
Baumgartner enrolled at Purdue University to play college football for the Purdue Boilermakers. He was on the freshman team in 1969. He made the traveling team in 1970 as the backup defensive tackle to starter John Handy. Baumgartner was then a two-year letterman from 1971 to 1972, and earned first-team All-Big Ten Conference honors in 1972 as a defensive end. In 2018, the Journal & Courier named Baumgartner the best Purdue football player to wear jersey number 97.

== Professional career ==
Baumgartner was selected by the New Orleans Saints in the second round, with the 51st overall pick, of the 1973 NFL draft. He was one of five Purdue players to be selected in the first two rounds of the draft that year. Baumgartner played in all 28 games for the Saints from 1973 to 1974 in a backup role, posting 1.5 sacks and one fumble recovery. He became the starting right defensive end in 1975, playing in all 28 games while starting 27 from 1975 to 1976, totaling two sacks and four fumble recoveries. He saw a decreased role during the 1977 season due to improved play from Elois Grooms and the drafting of first-round pick Joe Campbell. Baumgartner played in only five games for the Saints that year before being waived in late October.

On October 29, 1977, Baumgartner signed with the Houston Oilers. He played in six games for the Oilers during the 1977 season in a reserve role, recording one sack and two fumble recoveries. He converted to linebacker in 1978, playing in all 16 games as a backup and making one sack. In late August 1979, Baumgartner was placed on the injured list after injuring his knee in the final preseason game. He was activated on September 28 and played in the final 12 games of the season as a backup. Baumgartner was cut by the Oilers on August 26, 1980, before the team's final preseason game.

== Beer can collecting ==
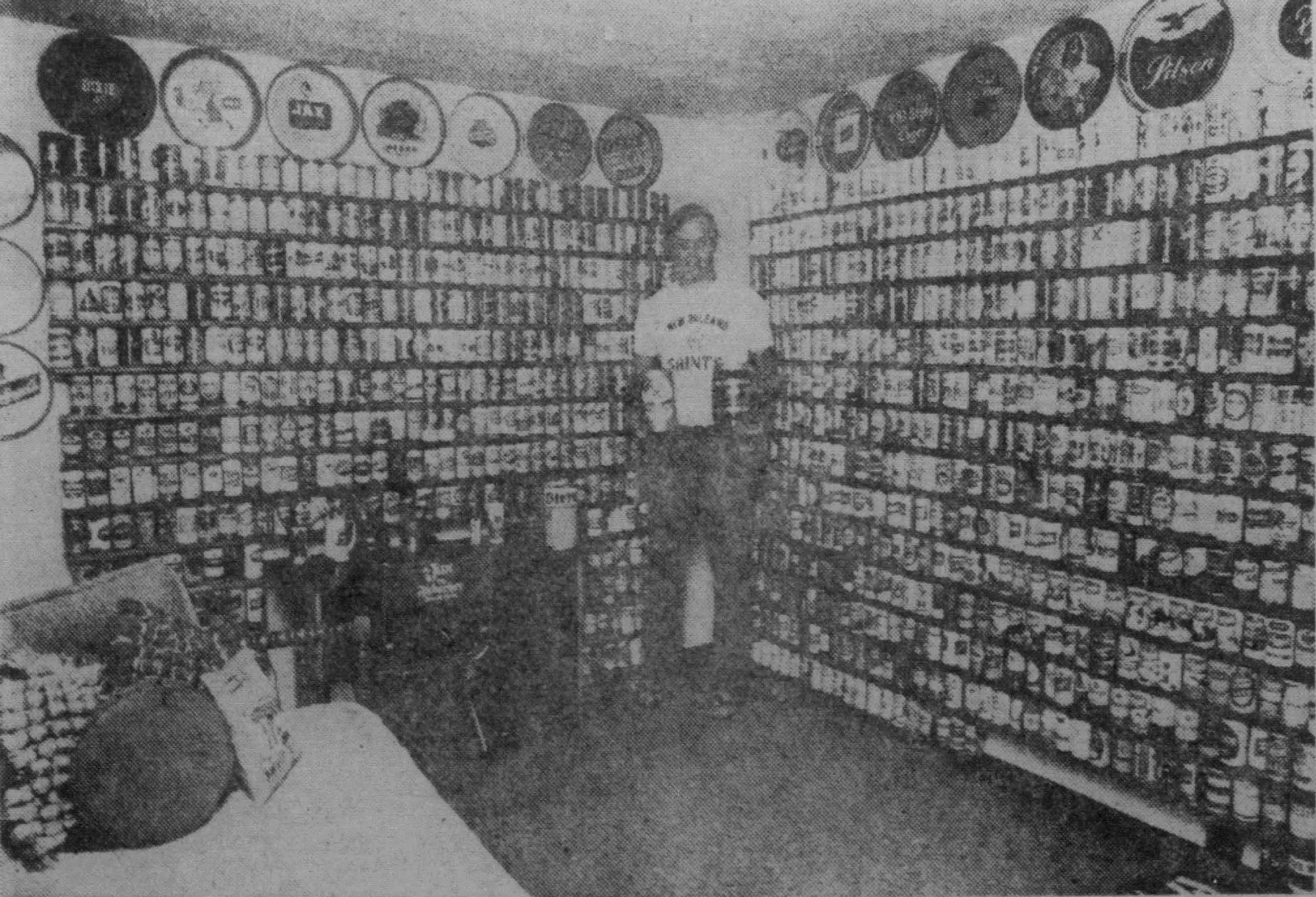
Baumgartner with his beer can collection

During his football career, Baumgartner had an unusual hobby as a beer can collector. He started collecting them during his freshman year of college and, as of 1975, had 1,200 beer cans lining the walls of a spare room at his house. In 1975, he was noted as being one of the 6,000 members of the Beer Can Collectors of America. Baumgartner said "I go out in the woods and look. Cans don't rust too badly under pine trees. I go just about anywhere except where I might get shot. Anywhere people congregate there will be beer cans." He also started teammate Jim Merlo's interest in beer can collecting. Baumgartner said his most valuable can was a Jackson Brewing Company can worth $25 depicting the LSU Tigers.
