= Prentice McCray =

American football player (born 1951)

No. 34
- Position: Safety

Personal information
- Born: March 1, 1951 (age 75); Los Angeles, California, U.S.
- Listed height: 6 ft 1 in (1.85 m)
- Listed weight: 188 lb (85 kg)

Career information
- High school: Edison (Stockton, California)
- College: Arizona State
- NFL draft: 1973: 8th round, 200th overall pick

Career history
- New England Patriots (1974–1980); Detroit Lions (1980)

Awards and highlights
- PFWA All-Rookie Team (1974); New England Patriots All-1970s Team

Career NFL statistics
- Interceptions: 15
- Interception yards: 352
- Touchdowns: 2
- Stats at Pro Football Reference

Prentice Marcellus McCray Jr. (born March 1, 1951) is an American former professional football player who was a safety in the National Football League (NFL). He played college football for the Arizona State Sun Devils and was selected by the Detroit Lions in the eighth round of the 1973 NFL draft. He was cut by Detroit during training camp in 1973 and did not play that entire year. The follow spring, the New England Patriots signed him as a free agent.

McCray was selected to the 1974 NFL All-Rookie Team as a member of the Patriots, starting all 14 games with three interceptions for 61 yards and a fumble recovery. His best and most memorable season was in 1976. During a game versus the New York Jets on November 21 at Shea Stadium, he intercepted Joe Namath twice and ran back both interceptions for touchdowns totaling 118 yards. He was named to the Patriots 70's All-Decade team in 2009.
