= Jim Hooks =

American football player (born 1950)

No. 30
- Position: Fullback

Personal information
- Born: October 23, 1950 (age 76); Oklahoma City, Oklahoma, U.S.
- Listed height: 5 ft 11 in (1.80 m)
- Listed weight: 225 lb (102 kg)

Career information
- High school: James
- College: Central Oklahoma
- NFL draft: 1973: 4th round, 96th overall pick

Career history
- Detroit Lions (1973–1976)
- Stats at Pro Football Reference

James Earl Hooks (born October 23, 1950) is an American former professional football player who was a fullback for the Detroit Lions of the National Football League (NFL). He played college football for the Central Oklahoma Bronchos.
