= Rick Kay =

American football player (1949–1998)

No. 52, 58
- Position: Linebacker

Personal information
- Born: November 10, 1949; Henderson, Nevada, U.S.
- Died: September 3, 1998 (aged 48); San Bernardino, California, U.S.
- Listed height: 6 ft 4 in (1.93 m)
- Listed weight: 235 lb (107 kg)

Career information
- High school: Pacific (San Bernardino)
- College: Colorado (1969–1972)
- NFL draft: 1973: undrafted

Career history
- Los Angeles Rams (1973–1977); Atlanta Falcons (1977)
- Stats at Pro Football Reference

Richard Floyd Kay (November 10, 1949 – September 3, 1998) was an American professional football player who was a linebacker for four seasons in the National Football League (NFL) with the Los Angeles Rams and Atlanta Falcons. He played college football for the Colorado Buffaloes.

== Early life and college ==
Richard Floyd Kay was born on November 10, 1949, in Henderson, Nevada. He attended Pacific High School in San Bernardino, California.

Kay was a member of the Colorado Buffaloes of the University of Colorado from 1969 to 1972 and a three-year letterman from 1970 to 1972. He began his college career as a tight end before switching to defense. He caught four passes for 34 yards and one touchdown in 1970.

== Professional career ==
Kay signed with the Los Angeles Rams after going undrafted in the 1973 NFL draft. He played in all 14 games for the Rams during the 1973 season. He missed the entire 1974 season due to injury. Kay appeared in all 14 games for the Rams again in 1975 and recovered one fumble. He played in three games, all starts, in 1976 and recorded one interception. He appeared in five games, starting one, for the Rams in 1977 before being released on October 18, 1977.

Kay was signed by the Atlanta Falcons on October 20, 1977, and played in seven games for them during the 1977 season. He was released by the Falcons in 1978.

== Personal life ==
Kay was the father of former Los Angeles Angels director of communications Eric Kay. He died in a car accident on Interstate 215 in San Bernardino, California, on September 3, 1998.
