= Clarence Duren =

American football player (born 1950)

No. 41, 21
- Position: Defensive back

Personal information
- Born: December 9, 1950 (age 75); Compton, California, U.S.
- Died: March 20, 2023
- Listed height: 6 ft 1 in (1.85 m)
- Listed weight: 190 lb (86 kg)

Career information
- High school: Gardena (Los Angeles)
- College: California
- NFL draft: 1973: undrafted

Career history
- St. Louis Cardinals (1973–1976); San Diego Chargers (1977)

Career NFL statistics
- Games played – started: 65 – 48
- Interceptions: 10
- Fumble recoveries: 6
- Stats at Pro Football Reference

Clarence Edward Duren (born December 9, 1950) is an American former professional football player who was a defensive back for five seasons in the National Football League (NFL). He played college football for the California Golden Bears. He played in the NFL for the St. Louis Cardinals from 1973 to 1976 and for the San Diego Chargers in 1977.
