= Jim Nicholson (offensive lineman) =

American football player (born 1949)

No. 70, 67
- Position: Offensive tackle

Personal information
- Born: February 28, 1949 (age 77); Honolulu, Hawaii, U.S.
- Listed height: 6 ft 6 in (1.98 m)
- Listed weight: 269 lb (122 kg)

Career information
- High school: Saint Louis (Honolulu)
- College: Michigan State
- NFL draft: 1973: 9th round, 219th overall pick

Career history
- Kansas City Chiefs (1974–1979); San Francisco 49ers (1981)

Awards and highlights
- Second-team All-Big Ten (1972)

Career NFL statistics
- Games played: 72
- Games started: 65
- Fumble recoveries: 3
- Stats at Pro Football Reference

James Burton Nicholson Jr. (born February 28, 1949) is an American former professional football player who was an offensive tackle in the National Football League (NFL). He played college football for the Michigan State Spartans. Nicholson was selected in ninth round of the 1973 NFL draft by the Los Angeles Rams and was traded in 1974 to the Kansas City Chiefs for a fifth-round draft pick. He started at right tackle for the Chiefs for six seasons, from 1974 to 1979. He was picked up on waivers by the San Diego Chargers in 1980 and played one game with the San Francisco 49ers in 1981.

On December 4, 2024, Nicholson was inducted into the Polynesian Football Hall of Fame.
