= Dwayne Crump =

American football player (born 1950)

No. 26
- Position: Defensive back

Personal information
- Born: August 9, 1950 (age 76); Madera, California, U.S.
- Listed height: 5 ft 11 in (1.80 m)
- Listed weight: 180 lb (82 kg)

Career information
- High school: Madera High
- College: Fresno State
- NFL draft: 1973: 6th round, 137th overall pick

Career history
- 1973–1976: St. Louis Cardinals
- 1977–1978: Montreal Alouettes

Awards and highlights
- Grey Cup champion (1977)
- Stats at Pro Football Reference

Dwayne Crump (born August 9, 1950) is an American former professional football player who played defensive back for four seasons for the St. Louis Cardinals He finished his career playing two seasons with the Montreal Alouettes, winning the Grey Cup in 1977.

== Early life ==
He was born in Madera, California and went to Madera High School.
