= Rob Scribner =

American pastor and football player (born 1951)

No. 33
- Position: Running back

Personal information
- Born: April 9, 1951 (age 75); Dallas, Texas, U.S.
- Listed height: 6 ft 0 in (1.83 m)
- Listed weight: 200 lb (91 kg)

Career information
- High school: Van Nuys
- College: UCLA
- NFL draft: 1973: undrafted

Career history
- Los Angeles Rams (1973–1976)
- Stats at Pro Football Reference

Robert Bruce Scribner (born April 9, 1951) is an American pastor and former professional football player who was a running back for the Los Angeles Rams of the National Football League (NFL). He played college football for the UCLA Bruins at the University of California, Los Angeles.

After his football career ended, he became a pastor at The Lighthouse Church in Santa Monica, California.
