= Jim Merlo =

American football player (born 1951)

No. 57
- Position: Linebacker

Personal information
- Born: October 3, 1951 (age 75); Sanger, California, U.S.
- Listed height: 6 ft 1 in (1.85 m)
- Listed weight: 221 lb (100 kg)

Career information
- College: Stanford
- NFL draft: 1973: 4th round, 86th overall pick

Career history
- New Orleans Saints (1973–1979)

Awards and highlights
- Third-team All-American (1972); First-team All-Pac-8 (1972)

Career NFL statistics
- Sacks: 6
- Fumble recoveries: 11
- Interceptions: 8
- Stats at Pro Football Reference

James Louis Merlo (born October 3, 1951) is an American former professional football player who was a linebacker for seven seasons with the New Orleans Saints of the National Football League (NFL). He played college football for the Stanford Cardinal. Merlo started collecting beer cans after being inspired by Saints teammate Steve Baumgartner. As of 1975, Merlo had 800 beer cans.
