= Ray Bonner =

American football player and coach (born 1950)

Biographical details
- Born: October 14, 1950; Cowan, Tennessee, U.S.

Playing career

Football
- 1965–1968: Middle Tennessee
- Position: Defensive back

Coaching career (HC unless noted)

Football
- 1979–1984: Columbia HS (GA)
- 1988: Southwest DeKalb HS (GA)
- 1989–1991: Alabama A&M (AHC)
- 1991: Alabama A&M (interim HC)
- 1992–1993: Alabama A&M
- 1994–2002: Texas Southern (assistant)
- 2003–2013: Cedar Grove HS (GA)
- 2014–?: Middle Tennessee (assistant)

Track
- 1996: Texas Southern
- 2004–2014: Cedar Grove HS (GA)
- 2013-Present: Middle Tennessee State University

Head coaching record
- Overall: 9–17–1 (college football)

Accomplishments and honors

Championships
- Football; 1 SIAC (1991)

Raymond Bonner (born October 14, 1950) is an American football coach and former player. He served as the head football coach at Alabama A&M University, first as an interim coach in 1991 and then as a full-time head coach from 1992 to 1993, compiling a record of 9–17–1. Bonner was selected in the tenth round by the Detroit Lions in the 1973 NFL draft.

== Head coaching record ==
=== College football ===
Year	Team	Overall	Conference	Standing	Bowl/playoffs
Alabama A&M Bulldogs (Southern Intercollegiate Athletic Conference) (1991–1993)
1991	Alabama A&M	2–3 (Note: George Pugh was forced out after the first six games of the 1991 season, having led the team to a 3–3 record. Ray Bonner replaced Pugh as head coach and led Alabama A&M for final five games of the season. The Bulldogs finished 5–6 overall, tying for the Southern Intercollegiate Athletic Conference title with a mark of 5–2.)	2–2	T–1st	
1992	Alabama A&M	3–8	3–4	T–5th	
1993	Alabama A&M	4–6–1	4–3–1	5th	
Alabama A&M:		9–17–1	9–9–1		
Total:		9–17–1			
National championship Conference title Conference division title or championship game berth
