= Dan Peiffer =

American football player (born 1951)

No. 53, 56
- Position: Center

Personal information
- Born: March 29, 1951 (age 75); Sigourney, Iowa, U.S.
- Listed height: 6 ft 3 in (1.91 m)
- Listed weight: 252 lb (114 kg)

Career information
- High school: Keota (Keota, Iowa)
- College: Southeast Missouri State
- NFL draft: 1973: 14th round, 346th overall pick

Career history
- Florida Blazers (1974); Chicago Bears (1975–1977); Washington Redskins (1980)

Career NFL statistics
- Games played: 37
- Games started: 32
- Stats at Pro Football Reference

Daniel William Peiffer (born March 29, 1951) is an American former professional football player who was a center in the National Football League (NFL) for the Chicago Bears and Washington Redskins. Peiffer played for the Florida Blazers of the World Football League (WFL) in 1974. He played college football at Ellsworth Community College before transferring to the Southeast Missouri State Redhawks program. He was selected by the St. Louis Cardinals in the 14th round of the 1973 NFL draft.

His son Blake Peiffer is an All-Conference linebacker at Southeast Missouri State.
