= Doug Winslow =

American football player (born 1951)

No. 80, 81
- Position: Wide receiver

Personal information
- Born: July 19, 1951 (age 75); Des Moines, Iowa, U.S.
- Listed height: 5 ft 11 in (1.80 m)
- Listed weight: 181 lb (82 kg)

Career information
- High school: Southeast Polk (IA)
- College: Drake
- NFL draft: 1973: 8th round, 207th overall pick

Career history
- New Orleans Saints (1973); Houston Texans/Shreveport Steamer (1974–1975); Washington Redskins (1976)

Career NFL statistics
- Games played: 17
- Receptions: 4
- Receiving yards: 45
- Stats at Pro Football Reference

Charles Douglas Winslow (born July 19, 1951) is an American former professional football player who was a wide receiver in the National Football League (NFL) for the New Orleans Saints and Washington Redskins. He played college football for the Drake Bulldogs and was selected in the eighth round of the 1973 NFL draft.

== Early life ==
Winslow was born in Des Moines, Iowa. He attended and played high school football at Southeast Polk High School in Pleasant Hill, Iowa, where he was awarded 1st Team All-State honors in 1969.

== College career ==
Winslow attended and played college football at Drake University, where he had earned a football scholarship. He was named a two-time All-Missouri Valley Conference player and a senior co-captain.

== Professional career ==
Winslow was selected in the eighth round of the 1973 NFL draft by the New Orleans Saints. After playing with the Saints in 1973, he joined the Houston Texans/Shreveport Steamer of the World Football League in the inaugural 1974 season. The league folded midway through its second season, in 1975. Winslows then played for Washington Redskins in 1976.
