= James Owens (American football coach) =

American football player and coach (1951–2016)

Biographical details
- Born: July 9, 1951; Fairfield, Alabama, U.S.
- Died: March 23, 2016 (aged 64); Auburn, Alabama, U.S.

Playing career
- 1969–1972: Auburn
- Position: Running back

Coaching career (HC unless noted)
- 1982–1985: Auburn (assistant)
- 1986–1989: Miles

James Curtis Owens (July 9, 1951 – May 26, 2016) was a pioneering American football player and coach. He was the first African American player in the history of the Auburn Tigers football team, playing as a running back from 1969 to 1972. He was drafted in the 11th round by the New Orleans Saints in the 1973 NFL draft but was cut after preseason practices.

Owens pursued a career in coaching, working as an assistant at his alma mater, Auburn University from 1982 to 1985, before serving as the head football coach at Miles College in Fairfield, Alabama from 1986 to 1989.

After retiring from coach, he served as the pastor of Pleasant Ridge Baptist Church in Dadeville, Alabama, from 2001 to 2013.
