= Eddie McMillan =

American football player (born 1951)

No. 41
- Position: Cornerback

Personal information
- Born: November 25, 1951 (age 74); Tampa, Florida, U.S.
- Listed height: 6 ft 0 in (1.83 m)
- Listed weight: 189 lb (86 kg)

Career information
- High school: Howard W. Blake
- College: Florida State
- NFL draft: 1973: 4th round, 95th overall pick

Career history
- Los Angeles Rams (1973–1975); Seattle Seahawks (1976–1977); Buffalo Bills (1978)
- Stats at Pro Football Reference

Edward Alexander McMillan (born November 25, 1951) is an American former professional football player who was a cornerback for seven seasons in the National Football League (NFL) from 1973 to 1979. He played college football for the Florida State Seminoles. He played in the NFL for the Los Angeles Rams, Seattle Seahawks and Buffalo Bills.
