= Derland Moore =

American football player (1951–2020)

No. 74
- Position: Nose tackle

Personal information
- Born: October 7, 1951; Malden, Missouri, U.S.
- Died: September 24, 2020 (aged 68); Mandeville, Louisiana, U.S.
- Listed height: 6 ft 4 in (1.93 m)
- Listed weight: 250 lb (113 kg)

Career information
- High school: Poplar Bluff (MO)
- College: Oklahoma
- NFL draft: 1973: 2nd round, 29th overall pick

Career history
- New Orleans Saints (1973–1985); New York Jets (1986)

Awards and highlights
- Pro Bowl (1983); New Orleans Saints 40th Anniversary Team; New Orleans Saints 50th Anniversary Team; New Orleans Saints Hall of Fame; First-team All-American (1972); 2× First-team All-Big Eight (1971, 1972); Missouri Sports Hall of Fame

Career NFL statistics
- Sacks: 48
- Fumble recoveries: 7
- Interceptions: 1
- Stats at Pro Football Reference

Derland Paul Moore (October 7, 1951 – September 24, 2020) was an American professional football nose tackle in the National Football League (NFL) for the New Orleans Saints and the New York Jets. An All-American, he played college football for the Oklahoma Sooners and was selected in the second round of the 1973 NFL draft. At the time he was drafted, Moore was the highest selected college walk-on in the history of the NFL draft, a distinction overtaken by fellow Oklahoma Sooner Baker Mayfield, the overall number one draft pick in 2018. Moore went on to set a team record for service with 169 games played in 13 seasons with the New Orleans Saints, playing for five permanent head coaches and three interim coaches in that time.

He led the team in sacks in 1980, and was selected to the Pro Bowl in 1983. Moore retired from the NFL in 1986 and was later inducted into the New Orleans Saints Hall of Fame, the New Orleans Saints 40th and 50th Anniversary Team, the Missouri Sports Hall of Fame, and was named as one of the Top 100 Sooners in Oklahoma University football history.

Moore died on September 24, 2020, age 68, from a lengthy illness.
