= Jim Peterson (American football) =

American football player (born 1950)

No. 57
- Position: Linebacker

Personal information
- Born: January 20, 1950 (age 76); San Diego, California, U.S.
- Listed height: 6 ft 5 in (1.96 m)
- Listed weight: 235 lb (107 kg)

Career information
- High school: Crawford (CA)
- College: San Diego State
- NFL draft: 1973: 6th round, 133rd overall pick

Career history
- Los Angeles Rams (1974–1975); Tampa Bay Buccaneers (1976)

Career NFL statistics
- Sacks: 1.5
- Fumble recoveries: 1
- Defensive TDs: 1
- Stats at Pro Football Reference

James E. Peterson (born January 20, 1950) is a former National Football League (NFL) linebacker who played from 1974 to 1976 for the Los Angeles Rams and Tampa Bay Buccaneers. He attended Crawford High School, then San Diego Mesa College and eventually San Diego State University before being drafted by the Rams in the 6th round, 133rd overall, of the 1973 NFL draft.
