= Roger Bernhardt =

American football player (born 1949)

No. 68
- Position: Guard

Personal information
- Born: October 14, 1949 (age 77); Lyons, New York, U.S.
- Listed height: 6 ft 4 in (1.93 m)
- Listed weight: 244 lb (111 kg)

Career information
- High school: Lyons
- College: Kansas
- NFL draft: 1973: 3rd round, 76 (By the Pittsburgh Steelers)th overall pick

Career history
- New York Jets (1974); Kansas City Chiefs (1975)
- Stats at Pro Football Reference

Roger Bernhardt (born October 14, 1949) is an American former professional football guard. He played for the New York Jets in 1974 and the Kansas City Chiefs in 1975.
