= Al Clark (American football) =

American football player (1948–2004)

No. 21, 44
- Position: Defensive back

Personal information
- Born: February 29, 1948; Bogalusa, Louisiana, U.S.
- Died: 4 June 2004 (aged 56)
- Listed height: 6 ft 0 in (1.83 m)
- Listed weight: 185 lb (84 kg)

Career information
- High school: Greenville Park (Hammond, Louisiana)
- College: Eastern Michigan
- NFL draft: 1971: 3rd round, 72nd overall pick

Career history
- Detroit Lions (1971); Los Angeles Rams (1972–1975); Philadelphia Eagles (1976)
- Stats at Pro Football Reference

Al Clark (February 29, 1948 – June 4, 2004) was an American professional football defensive back who played six seasons in the National Football League (NFL) with the Detroit Lions, Los Angeles Rams, and Philadelphia Eagles.

== Early life ==
Clark was born in Bogalusa, Louisiana and attended Greenville Park High School in Hammond, Louisiana. He enrolled and played college football at Grambling State University before transferring to Northern Arizona University and lastly Eastern Michigan University.

== Professional career ==
Clark was selected by the Detroit Lions in the third round of the 1971 NFL draft, 72nd overall. After one year with the Lions as a cornerback and kick returner, Clark signed with the Rams, where he stayed for four years. His final year was with the Eagles in 1976.

On December 10, 1972, Clark was on the field when St. Louis Cardinals' quarterback Jim Hart completed a pass to Bobby Moore (later known as Ahmad Rashad), who caught the ball on the run near his own 40-yard line. After Gene Howard, Jim Nettles, Marlin McKeever, and Dave Elmendorf missed tackles, Clark brought down Moore on the Rams' one-yard line, making it the longest non-scoring pass play in NFL history.

== Later life ==
Clark died June 4, 2004, of undisclosed causes.
