= Mike Fink (gridiron football) =

American gridiron football player (born 1950)

Profile
- Position: Defensive back

Personal information
- Born: December 24, 1950 (age 75); Kansas City, Missouri, U.S.
- Listed height: 5 ft 11 in (1.80 m)
- Listed weight: 181 lb (82 kg)

Career information
- College: Missouri
- NFL draft: 1973: 9th round, 210th overall pick

Career history
- 1973: New Orleans Saints
- 1975–1976: Edmonton Eskimos

Awards and highlights
- Grey Cup champion (1975)
- Stats at Pro Football Reference

Paul Michael Fink (born December 24, 1950) is an American former gridiron football player who played in the CFL and NFL for the Edmonton Eskimos and New Orleans Saints. He won the Grey Cup with Edmonton in 1975. He played college football at the University of Missouri and was selected by the Saints in the 9th round of the 1973 NFL draft.
