= Roy Miller High School =

Roy Miller Metro High School

Location
- 1 Battlin' Buc Blvd. Corpus Christi, Texas 78408-3798; United States; 27.7946°N 97.42266°W

Information
- School type: Public high school
- Motto: Once a Buc Always a Buc!
- Established: 1894
- School district: Corpus Christi Independent School District
- Principal: Aurelio Tamayo
- Teaching staff: 85.28 (FTE)
- Grades: 9-12
- Enrollment: 1,409 (2019-20)
- Student to teacher ratio: 16.52
- Campus: Urban
- Colors: Purple and gold
- Athletics conference: UIL Class 5A
- Mascot: Buccaneers/Lady Buccaneers
- Website: Roy Miller High School

Roy Miller High School is a public high school located in the city of Corpus Christi, Texas, United States and classified as a 4A school by the UIL. It is a part of the Corpus Christi Independent School District. The school was known as Corpus Christi High School until 1950. It is the oldest high school in the city.

== History ==
Established in 1894, Roy Miller is the oldest high school in Corpus Christi. Originally known as Corpus Christi High, the school was renamed in 1950 in honor of Henry Pomeroy Miller, the former mayor of Corpus Christi. The 1950 opening of W. B. Ray High School relieved Miller High; each high school at the time took about half of the public high school students in Corpus Christi.

Miller is a center for science and technology. The recently improved science and computer labs add to Miller's academic experience. In conjunction with Del Mar College, Miller offers a series of Dual-Credit academies which include: Cosmetology, Fire Science, and welding. In 2013, the school was rated "Met Standard" by the Texas Education Agency.

== Athletics ==
The Miller Buccaneers compete in these sports: Volleyball, Cross Country, Football, Basketball, Soccer, Golf, Tennis, Track, Baseball & Softball

=== State titles ===
- Boys Basketball
  - 1950(2A)
- Football
  - 1938(All), 1960(4A)
- Boys Track
  - 1947(All), 1949(2A)

== Notable alumni ==
- Marshall Applewhite, founder of Heaven's Gate
- Barbara Barrie, actress
- Jesse Benavides, WBO super bantamweight champion
- Dabney Coleman, actor
- Zuehl Conoly, football player
- Pamelya Herndon, member of the New Mexico House of Representatives
- Edwin Kessler (1945), atmospheric scientist and Doppler weather radar pioneer
- Eva Longoria, actress
- Allen Ludden, host of TV game show Password
- Abraham Quintanilla, Jr., singer, father of Selena
- Johnny Roland, football player and coach
- George Conrad Westervelt, US Navy officer and aviation pioneer
- William I. Westervelt, US Army brigadier general
