= 1973 Buffalo Bills season =

14th season in franchise history

- Owner: Ralph Wilson
- Head coach: Lou Saban
- Home stadium: Rich Stadium

Results
- Record: 9–5
- Division place: 2nd AFC East
- Playoffs: Did not qualify
- Pro Bowlers: RB O.J. Simpson; CB Robert James; OT Dave Foley

The 1973 Buffalo Bills season was the 14th season for the team and their 4th season in the National Football League (NFL). The Bills finished in 2nd place in the AFC East division and finished the 1973 NFL season with a record of 9–5, the team's first winning record since 1966.

Head coach Lou Saban began the second season of his second tenure with the Bills. Saban had previously led the team to the 1964 and 1965 AFL championships. This was the first season that the team played in Rich Stadium (which changed names over a decade later) after thirteen years playing at War Memorial Stadium ("The Rockpile").

The Bills were returning from 1–13 and 4–9–1 records in 1971 and 1972, respectively. Incumbent starting quarterback Dennis Shaw found himself in a battle with rookie Joe Ferguson for the starting job.

The season was defined by O. J. Simpson. The fifth-year running back became the first player in NFL history to rush for 2,000 yards in a season. Behind Simpson's record-setting season, the Bills set an NFL record for most team rushing yards in a 14-game season, with 3,088 and averaged 5.1 yards per carry, higher than every Super Bowl championship team in all of league history. Simpson was returning from his best professional season, in which he earned his first All-Pro recognition and first rushing title. In addition to establishing a then-record for single-season rushing yardage, with 2,003 yards, Simpson established the single-season record for rushing yards gained per game (143.1 yards per game on 23.7 rushes per game, an average of six yards per carry), which still stands. The explosive offense centered on O. J. Simpson was nicknamed the "Electric Company" for its ability to turn on "The Juice" ("O. J." Simpson).

After 12 years, this was the final season to feature the standing red bison logo on the helmets. The next season, the team introduced a new logo depicting a blue buffalo silhouette charging to the right with a red stripe extending from the animal's eye to its back. The updated logo remains in use by the team.

== Electric Company era begins ==
Although some describe the entire 1970s decade as the Electric Company era, the 1973 season marked a new era in Bills history and is regarded by many as the beginning of the Electric Company era of the mid-1970s. The team ushered in a new stadium, new uniforms and a transformed team built through the draft and a few key trades. With all the emphasis on rushing the team would only post two 100-yard receiving efforts.

The Bills started the season 4–1 and then lost four of their next five before winning their final 4 games. Rookie quarterback Joe Ferguson, who eventually would be the Bills starting quarterback for 12 seasons, started all 14 games at quarterback. Dennis Shaw who had been the starter the previous three seasons, saw action in four games.

== Simpson's record-breaking year ==
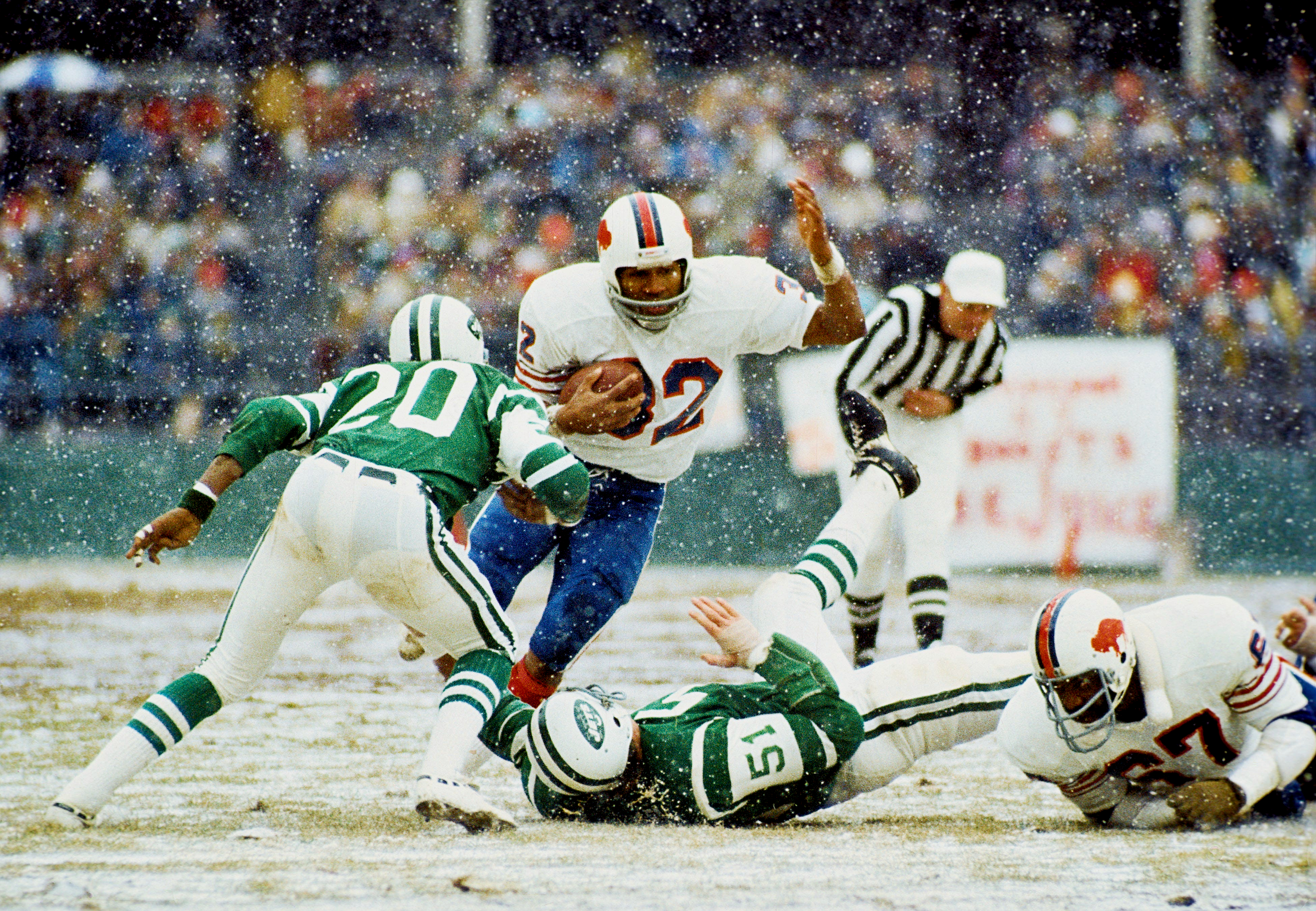
Simpson pictured in the game where he became the first running back to gain over 2,000 yards in a season on Dec. 16, 1973.

Running back O. J. Simpson broke the 2,000-yard barrier for rushing yards in a season, and was voted NFL Most Valuable Player. Simpson began and ended the fourteen-game season with bookend five-game streaks where he ran for at least 100 yards. 1973 was the fifth of nine consecutive seasons that Simpson led the team in rushing yards.

It was also the first time Simpson would lead the NFL in rushing touchdowns, first time he would lead the league in yards from scrimmage and the second time he would lead the league in rushing yards. (Although Simpson posted a career best 6.0 yards per carry in 1973, he was surpassed by Mercury Morris who posted a 6.4 yards per carry average for the 1973 Miami Dolphins. The only season that Simpson led the league in yards per carry was two years later when he averaged 5.5 yards per carry.)

Although Simpson's 2003 yard total has now been eclipsed by 5 other runners, as of 2010, his 143.1 yards per game remains an NFL single-season record due to being achieved in a fourteen-game season. (All subsequent 2,000-yard seasons took place in 16 games.)

Simpson was named Associated Press Athlete of the Year.

== Offensive firepower ==
The "Electric Company" of Simpson, Jim Braxton, and rookie Paul Seymour and Joe DeLamielleure led a dramatic turnaround on the field. The "Electric Company" was the nickname of the offensive line (OG Reggie McKenzie, OT Dave Foley, Centers Mike Montler and Bruce Jarvis OG Joe DeLamielleure and OT Donnie Green) which "turned on the Juice" (i.e. O. J. Simpson). The offensive guards were a pair of young future All-Pro performers: Pro Football Hall of Famer DeLamielleure (drafted 26th overall in 1973) and College Football Hall of Famer McKenzie (drafted 27th overall in 1972).

Paul Seymour, who would play his entire career with the Bills, became the team's starting tight end. Seymour had been an All-American tackle for Michigan after having played two season at tight end. Seymour went on to start at tight end for a total of five seasons. replacing former tight end Jan White.

Running backs Braxton and Larry Watkins shared the fullback duties with each accumulating over 400 yards rushing. Braxton's 4.6 yards per carry were eighth-most in the NFL.

Wide receiver Bob Chandler led the team in receiving yards, the first of four years he would do so. During the season, Wallace Francis, who finished second in the league in kickoff return average, was the only player in the league to return two kickoffs for touchdowns. John Leypoldt's 70% field goal percentage ranked fifth in the league.

== Awards, accolades and legacy ==
The 1973 Bills had three participants in the 1974 Pro Bowl and two members of the All-Pro team.

1973 was the second Pro Bowl and first All-Pro season for cornerback Robert James. Offensive tackle Foley was also voted to the Pro Bowl. Guard McKenzie's was voted to the All-Pro team. Simpson made this third Pro Bowl and second All-Pro team. Both Simpson and James were returning Pro Bowl selections.

The team was featured in the video game Madden NFL '96 as one of the game's "classic" teams, along with 1990–1993 Bills, who won four consecutive AFC Championships.

== Offseason ==
On April 19, 1973, the Bills traded linebackers Edgar Chandler and Jeff Lyman and fullback Wayne Patrick to the New England Patriots for linebacker Jim Cheyunski, Halvor Hagen and Mike Montler. Although Patrick had been the Bills' Fullback, he lost the starting job to Jim Braxton in 1972.

The Bills also acquired of the Miami Dolphins' top draft selection Mike Kadish in exchange for guard Irv Goode. The Bills traded defensive tackle Al Cowlings to Houston in exchange for defensive end Earl Edwards. Longtime Bills linebacker Mike Stratton, who had spent the last ten seasons with Buffalo, left the team to play his final season with the San Diego Chargers.

=== NFL draft ===
The team drafted several players in the 1973 NFL draft who contributed to the offense as starters during this record-setting season. Offensive linemen Paul Seymour and Joe DeLamielleure became cornerstones of the Bills' "Electric Company" offensive line. DeLamielleure was voted to five consecutive Pro Bowls for the Bills (1975–1979), to the NFL 1970s All-Decade Team, and to the Pro Football Hall of Fame in 2003.

Quarterback Joe Ferguson played 164 games at quarterback in 12 seasons for the Bills, a franchise-record. Ferguson retired as the team's all-time leading passer, and his 27,590 passing yards are still second in franchise history behind Hall of Famer Jim Kelly.

1973 Buffalo Bills draft
Round	Pick	Player	Position	College	Notes
1	7	Paul Seymour	Tight end	Michigan	
1	26	Joe DeLamielleure * ^{†}	Guard	Michigan State	
2	32	Jeff Winans	Defensive tackle	USC	
3	57	Joe Ferguson	Quarterback	Arkansas	
3	77	Bob Kampa	Defensive tackle	California	
5	110	Wallace Francis	Wide receiver	Arkansas State	
6	136	John Skorupan	Linebacker	Penn State	
7	162	Brian McConnell	Linebacker	Michigan State	
7	181	John Ford	Tight end	Henderson State	
8	190	Lee Fobbs	Running back	Grambling	
10	240	Matthew Reed	Quarterback	Grambling	
10	259	John LeHeup	Linebacker	South Carolina	
11	265	Richard Earl	Tackle	Tennessee	
12	294	Ronnie Carroll	Defensive tackle	Sam Houston State	
14	344	Merv Krakau	Linebacker	Iowa State	
15	369	Joe Rizzo	Linebacker	Kings Point	
15	379	Vince O'Neil	Running back	Kansas	
17	423	John Stearns	Defensive back	Colorado	
Made roster † Pro Football Hall of Fame * Made at least one Pro Bowl during career

== Personnel ==
=== Staff/coaches ===
1973 Buffalo Bills staff
Front office: Owner/CEO/President – Ralph Wilson; Vice president and general manager – Bob Lustig; Vice president – Pat McGroder; Head coaches: Head coach – Lou Saban; Offensive coaches: Receivers – Bob Shaw; Offensive line – Jim Ringo	Defensive coaches: Defensive line – Stan Jones; Linebackers – Jim Dooley; Defensive backfield – Bill Atkins; Special teams coaches: Special teams – Ed Cavanaugh

=== Final roster ===
1973 Buffalo Bills roster
Quarterbacks (QB): 12 Joe Ferguson; 10 Leo Hart; 16 Dennis Shaw; Running backs (RB): 34 Jim Braxton; 46 Steve Jones; 32 O. J. Simpson; 36 Pete Van Valkenburg; 38 Larry Watkins; Wide receivers (WR): 81 Bob Chandler; 40 J. D. Hill; 89 Wallace Francis; 80 Ray Jarvis; Tight ends (TE): 87 Paul Seymour	Offensive linemen (OL): 60 Bill Adams G; 68 Joe DeLamielleure G; 78 Dave Foley T; 74 Donnie Green T; 51 Bruce Jarvis C; 67 Reggie McKenzie G; 53 Mike Montler C; 56 Willie Parker C/G; 69 Bob Penchion G; Defensive linemen (DL): 73 Earl Edwards DE; 88 Halvor Hagen DE; 71 Mike Kadish DT; 70 Bob Kampa DE; 79 Steve Okoniewski DT; 77 Jerry Patton DT; 85 Walt Patulski DE; 75 Jeff Winans DT	Linebackers (LB): 50 Jim Cheyunski MLB; 30 Bo Cornell OLB; 54 Phil Croyle OLB; 57 Fred Forsberg OLB; 52 Merv Krakau MLB; 56 Rich Lewis OLB; 55 John Skorupan OLB; Defensive backs (DB): 22 Bill Cahill FS; 21 Larry Carwell CB; 43 Tony Greene FS/CB; 25 Dwight Harrison CB; 20 Robert James CB; 24 Ernie Kellermann SS; 37 Ted Koy SS; 26 Donnie Walker FS; Special teams (ST): 11 Spike Jones P; 3 John Leypoldt K	Reserve: 39 Cookie Brinkman TE (IR); 72 Don Croft DT (IR); 86 Dave Washington LB (IR); 62 Jeff Yeates DE (PUP); Rookies in italics

Pro-Football-Reference

== Regular season ==
=== Schedule ===
- On Week 1, (played on September 16), against the New England Patriots, O. J. Simpson sets record with 250 yards to go with two touchdowns.
- On Week 14, (played on December 16), against the New York Jets. O. J. Simpson rushes for 200 yards to reach a season total of 2,003. He became the first running back to eclipse 2,000 yards and broke Jim Brown's season record of 1,863 set ten years earlier. Seven players have since rushed for 2,000 yards, with Simpson being passed in 1984, but Simpson is the only one to have done his mark in a fourteen-game season, and his 143.1 yards per game for that season still ranks as the best in NFL history.

Week	Date	Opponent	Result	Record	Venue	Recap
1	September 16	at **New England Patriots**	**W** 31–13	1–0	Schaefer Stadium	Recap
2	September 23	at San Diego Chargers	**L** 7–34	1–1	San Diego Stadium	Recap
3	September 30	**New York Jets**	**W** 9–7	2–1	Rich Stadium	Recap
4	October 7	Philadelphia Eagles	**W** 27–26	3–1	Rich Stadium	Recap
5	October 14	**Baltimore Colts**	**W** 31–13	4–1	Rich Stadium	Recap
6	October 21	at **Miami Dolphins**	**L** 6–27	4–2	Miami Orange Bowl	Recap
7	October 29	Kansas City Chiefs	**W** 23–14	5–2	Rich Stadium	Recap
8	November 4	at New Orleans Saints	**L** 0–13	5–3	Tulane Stadium	Recap
9	November 11	Cincinnati Bengals	**L**13–16	5–4	Rich Stadium	Recap
10	November 18	**Miami Dolphins**	**L** 0–17	5–5	Rich Stadium	Recap
11	November 25	at **Baltimore Colts**	**W** 24–17	6–5	Memorial Stadium	Recap
12	December 2	at Atlanta Falcons	**W** 17–6	7–5	Atlanta Stadium	Recap
13	December 9	**New England Patriots**	**W** 37–13	8–5	Rich Stadium	Recap
14	December 16	at **New York Jets**	**W** 34–14	9–5	Shea Stadium	Recap
Note: Intra-division opponents are in **bold** text.

=== Standings ===
AFC East
	W	L	T	PCT	DIV	CONF	PF	PA	STK
Miami Dolphins	12	2	0	.857	7–1	9–2	343	150	W1
Buffalo Bills	9	5	0	.643	6–2	7–4	259	230	W4
New England Patriots	5	9	0	.357	1–7	3–8	258	300	L2
New York Jets	4	10	0	.286	4–4	4–7	240	306	L2
Baltimore Colts	4	10	0	.286	2–6	2–9	226	341	W2

=== O. J. Simpson ===
O. J. Simpson had three 200-yard rushing games, six 150-yard rushing games and eleven 100-yard rushing games. He only had 30 rushes in a game twice all season, but totaled 2,003 yards due to a 6.0 yards-per-carry average. Over the course of the season Simpson also caught six pass receptions.

Date	Home/Away	Opponent	Result	Rushes	Yards	Yards/Attempt	Touchdowns	Receptions	Yards
September 16, 1973	A	NWE	W 31–13	29	250	8.62	2	0	0
September 23, 1973	A	SDG	L 7–34	22	103	4.68	1	0	0
September 30, 1973	H	NYJ	W 9–7	24	123	5.13	0	2	15
October 7, 1973	H	PHI	W 27–26	27	171	6.33	1	3	33
October 14, 1973	H	BAL	W 31–13	22	166	7.55	2	0	0
October 21, 1973	A	MIA	L 6–27	14	55	3.93	0	0	0
October 29, 1973	H	KAN	W 23–14	39	157	4.03	2	0	0
November 4, 1973	A	NOR	L 0–13	20	79	3.95	0	0	0
November 11, 1973	H	CIN	L 13–16	20	99	4.95	1	0	0
November 18, 1973	H	MIA	L 0–17	20	120	6.00	0	1	22
November 25, 1973	A	BAL	W 24–17	15	124	8.27	1	0	0
December 2, 1973	A	ATL	W 17–6	24	137	5.71	0	0	0
December 9, 1973	H	NWE	W 37–13	22	219	9.95	1	0	0
December 16, 1973	A	NYJ	W 34–14	34	200	5.88	1	0	0

=== Game summaries ===
==== Week 1 ====
Week 1: Buffalo Bills at New England Patriots

Team	1	2	3	4	Total
• Buffalo Bills (1–0)	7	3	7	14	31
New England Patriots (0–1)	6	0	7	0	13

- Location: Schaefer Stadium (astroturf)
  Foxborough, Massachusetts
- Game start: 1:00 PM
- Game attendance: 56,119
- Game weather: 64 degrees, relative humidity 71%, wind 15 mph
- Referee: Fred Silva

Simpson rushed for 250 yards on 29 carries, setting a new NFL single-game rushing record. He surpassed Willie Ellison's 247-yard performance in 1971. Although the Bills had gone 0–6 in their exhibition schedule, they started the season with a 31–13 victory in Chuck Fairbanks's debut as New England Patriots coach. Simpson scored on an 80-yard run in the first quarter and a 22-yard run in the third quarter. Backup back Larry Watkins also had a strong day with 105 rushing yards and two touchdowns.

==== Week 2 ====
Week 2: Buffalo Bills at San Diego Chargers

Team	1	2	3	4	Total
Buffalo Bills (1–1)	0	7	0	0	7
• San Diego Chargers (1–1)	7	7	14	6	34

- Location: San Diego Stadium (grass)
  San Diego
- Game start: 1:00 PM
- Game attendance: 47,588
- Game weather: 67 degrees, relative humidity 70%, wind 11 mph

The Bills surrendered an opening kickoff return touchdown, 3 quarterback sacks and 4 interceptions, despite 103 yards rushing by Simpson and 118 yards receiving by Hill. The Bills surrendered 27 consecutive points after Simpson tied the score 7–7 with a 6-yard second quarter run.

==== Week 3 ====
Week 3: New York Jets at Buffalo Bills

Team	1	2	3	4	Total
New York Jets (1–2)	0	0	0	7	7
• Buffalo Bills (2–1)	3	0	0	6	9

- Location: Rich Stadium (astroturf)
  Orchard Park, New York
- Game start: 1:00 PM
- Game attendance: 77,425
- Game weather: 53 degrees, relative humidity 62%, wind 9 mph
- Referee: Pat Haggerty

The Bills' Rich Stadium debut was a sellout of 80,200 with 2595 no-shows. Simpson rushed for 123 yards, giving him 476 in his first three games. The Bills scored on three Leypoldt field goals. He made a 42-yarder in the first quarter and added two more in the fourth quarter. The Jets almost became the Bills' first shutout victim since 1965, but Al Woodall (playing in place of an injured Joe Namath) hit Jerome Barkum for 34 yards with two seconds left.

==== Week 4 ====
Week 4: Philadelphia Eagles at Buffalo Bills

Team	1	2	3	4	Total
Philadelphia Eagles (0–3–1)	6	10	7	3	26
• Buffalo Bills (3–1)	10	14	0	3	27

- Location: Rich Stadium (astroturf)
  Orchard Park, New York
- Game start: 1:00 PM
- Game attendance: 72,364
- Game weather: 56 degrees, relative humidity 66%, wind 8 mph
- Referee: Fred Wyant

The Bills opted for a 47-yard Leypoldt field goal with four minutes remaining after driving 42 yards to Eagles' 40-yard-line. The score held up in the final minutes. On the day, Simpson's 171-yard rushing performance offset a pair of 100-yard performances by Tom Sullivan and Norm Bulaich.

==== Week 5 ====
Week 5: Baltimore Colts at Buffalo Bills

Team	1	2	3	4	Total
Baltimore Colts (1–4)	3	3	0	7	13
• Buffalo Bills (4–1)	0	10	7	14	31

- Date: October 14, 1973
- Location: Rich Stadium (astroturf)
  Orchard Park, New York
- Game start: 1:00 PM
- Game attendance: 78,875
- Game weather: 58 degrees, relative humidity 58%, wind 27 mph
- Referee: Bob Frederic

O. J. posted 166 yards, giving him his fifth 100-yard rushing effort in five games and giving him 813 for the season. The Colts had given Simpson 1-yard losses on his first two carries. Ferguson got the scoring started by connecting with Larry Watkins for 10-yards and later scored on a 1-yard quarterback keeper. Simpson scored on a 3-yard run in the third quarter and on a 78-yard run in the fourth "thrilled a crowd of 78,875".

==== Week 6 ====
Week 6: Buffalo Bills at Miami Dolphins

Team	1	2	3	4	Total
Buffalo Bills (4–2)	3	0	0	3	6
• Miami Dolphins (5–1)	3	21	3	0	27

- Date: October 21, 1973
- Location: Orange Bowl (astroturf)
  Miami, Florida
- Game start: 1:00 PM
- Game attendance: 65,241
- Game weather: 80 degrees, relative humidity 77%, wind 17 mph
- Referee: Fred Silva

Miami took over first place in the AFC East by halting Simpson's streak of consecutive 100-yard performances. They held him to 55 yards on 14 carries before he left the game with an ankle sprain in the fourth quarter. Miami posted a 21-point second quarter highlighted by a pair of touchdown passes from Bob Griese to Jim Mandich. The Bills made no first downs in the first half. Leypoldt and Garo Yepremian opened and closed the scoring by swapping field goals. The Dolphins' other touchdown came when a 21-yard Paul Warfield reception set up a Mercury Morris 4-yard touchdown.

==== Week 7 ====
Week 7: Kansas City Chiefs at Buffalo Bills

Team	1	2	3	4	Total
Kansas City Chiefs (3–3–1)	0	7	0	7	14
• Buffalo Bills (5–2)	14	0	9	0	23

- Date: October 29, 1973
- Location: Rich Stadium (astroturf)
  Orchard Park, New York
- Game start: 9:00 PM
- Game attendance: 76,071
- Game weather: 45 degrees, relative humidity 92%, wind 19 mph

Simpson set an NFL record for yards in the first seven games by surpassing 1,000 yards with a 157-yard effort. His total of 1,025 was 54 ahead of Brown's pace. Simpson set the NFL single-game record for carries with 39 surpassing the 38 by Jim Nance in 1966 and Harry Newman in 1934. In the Monday night game, the visiting Chiefs fumbled on their opening possession on their own 15-yard-line, leading to a Bills touchdown on four consecutive rushes. Three plays into the Chiefs' second possession, Cheyunski intercepted Len Dawson and returned it 31 yards to the 4-yard-line, leading to another Simpson score for a 14–0 lead in the first quarter. Leypoldt added three field goals in the third quarter.

==== Week 8 ====
Week 8: Buffalo Bills at New Orleans Saints

Team	1	2	3	4	Total
Buffalo Bills (5–3)	0	0	0	0	0
• New Orleans Saints (4–4)	3	10	0	0	13

- Date: November 4, 1973
- Location: Tulane Stadium (astroturf)
  New Orleans
- Game start: 1:00 PM
- Game attendance: 74,770
- Game weather: 73 degrees, relative humidity 83%, wind 9 mph
- Referee: Jack Reader

Simpson had totaled 1025 yards in the first half of the season, which was ahead of the 971 Brown had gained in his first seven games. The Saints posted all their scoring in the first half and kept the Bills to under 200 yards of total offense while shutting them out.

==== Week 9 ====
Week 9: Cincinnati Bengals at Buffalo Bills

Team	1	2	3	4	Total
• Cincinnati Bengals (5–4)	6	7	0	3	16
Buffalo Bills (5–4)	3	3	7	0	13

- Date: November 11, 1973
- Location: Rich Stadium (astroturf)
  Orchard Park, New York
- Game start: 1:00 PM
- Game attendance: 76,927
- Game weather: 34 degrees, relative humidity 69%, wind 14 mph, wind chill 25
- Referee: Ben Dreith

Simpson posted 99 yards on 20 carries including a 32-yard game-tying touchdown run in the third quarter. He had a 1,203 total for nine games. It appeared the game would end in a tie until the Bengals' Horst Muhlmann made a 33-yard field goal with three seconds remaining.

==== Week 10 ====
Week 10: Miami Dolphins at Buffalo Bills

Team	1	2	3	4	Total
• Miami Dolphins (9–1)	7	10	0	0	17
Buffalo Bills (5–5)	0	0	0	0	0

- Date: November 18, 1973
- Location: Rich Stadium (astroturf)
  Orchard Park, New York
- Game start: 1:00 PM
- Game attendance: 77,138
- Game weather: 37 degrees, relative humidity 70%, wind 12 mph, wind chill 28
- Referee: Dick Jorgensen

The Dolphins clinched the East Division title with a 17–0 shutout of the Bills. Miami's first touchdown drive included two fourth-and-one conversions by Jim Kiick. With Miami leading 10–0, Buffalo drove from their own 20-yard-line to the Dolphins' 4-yard-line and then turned the ball over on downs four plays later at the 1-yard-line. In the game, the Bills were shut out despite a pair of 100-yard rushing efforts by Simpson and Braxton who posted 120 and 119 yards respectively.

==== Week 11 ====
Week 11: Buffalo Bills at Baltimore Colts

Team	1	2	3	4	Total
• Buffalo Bills (6–5)	3	7	0	14	24
Baltimore Colts (2–9)	7	0	0	10	17

- Date: November 25, 1973
- Location: Memorial Stadium (grass)
  Baltimore
- Game start: 1:00 PM
- Game attendance: 52,250
- Game weather: 61 degrees, relative humidity 78%, wind 16 mph
- Referee: Fred Swearingen

The Bills built a 10–7 halftime lead on the strength of a 58-yard Simpson touchdown run. Marty Domres connected with Tom Mitchell and George Hunt added a field goal to give Baltimore a 17–10 lead. Late in the game the Colts gave the Bills good field position following an 18-yard punt by David Lee. Ferguson passed for 38-yards to Bob Chandler to tie the score with 1:34 remaining. Then Dwight Harrison recorded a 31-yard interception return with 1:11 remaining to give the Bills their final margin of victory. The game marked only the second and final time all season the Bills passed for 100 yards.

==== Week 12 ====
Week 12: Buffalo Bills at Atlanta Falcons

Team	1	2	3	4	Total
• Buffalo Bills (7–5)	7	3	7	0	17
Atlanta Falcons (8–4)	0	6	0	0	6

- Date: December 2, 1973
- Location: Atlanta Stadium (grass)
  Atlanta
- Game start: 1:00 PM
- Game attendance: 54,607
- Game weather: 52 degrees, relative humidity 62%, wind 12 mph

Braxton, who totaled 80 yards on 23 carries accounted for both of the Bills' touchdowns. Simpson posted 137 yards on 24 carries. The Falcon's scoring came from future Bills kicker Nick Mike-Mayer who posted two field goals.

==== Week 13 ====
Week 13: New England Patriots at Buffalo Bills

Team	1	2	3	4	Total
New England Patriots (5–8)	3	3	7	0	13
• Buffalo Bills (8–5)	7	10	17	3	37

- Date: December 9, 1973
- Location: Rich Stadium (astroturf)
  Orchard Park, New York
- Game start: 1:00 PM
- Game attendance: 72,470
- Game weather: 30 degrees, relative humidity 88%, wind 9 mph, wind chill 22

After New England posted a first-quarter field goal, Francis returned the kickoff 90 yards to give the Bills a lead they would not relinquish. Simpson posted 219 yards on 22 carries including a 6-yard touchdown that put the Bills ahead 14–3 in the second quarter. Chandler caught two touchdown passes from Ferguson and Leypoldt added three field goals. The effort earned Simpson his third NFL Offensive Player of the Week honor.

==== Week 14 at Jets ====
Week Fourteen: Buffalo Bills (8–5) at New York Jets (4–9)

Quarter	1	2	3	4	Total
Bills	7	14	7	6	**34**
Jets	7	0	0	7	**14**

at Shea Stadium • Flushing, New York

- Date: December 16
- Game time: 1:00 p.m. EDT
- Game weather: Flurries • 31 °F (−1 °C) • Wind 17 miles per hour (27 km/h; 15 kn)
- Game attendance: 47,740
- Referee: Bob Frederic
- Pro-Football-Reference.com

Game information

Bills

- Joe Ferguson
  3/5, 70 Yds
- O. J. Simpson
  34 Rush, 200 Yds, TD
- Bob Chandler
  2 Rec, 55 Yds

Jets

- Joe Namath
  13/30, 206 Yds, 2 TD
- Emerson Boozer
  7 Rush, 32 Yds
- Jerome Barkum
  4 Rec, 102 Yds, TD

Simpson entered the final game needing 61 yards to eclipse Brown's record of 1863 yards and the team entered the game needing 177 rushing yards to break the team record of 2960 set by the 1972 Miami Dolphins. In addition Simpson needed 197 rushing yards to gain 2,000 yards rushing overall on the season. He posted 200 yards on 34 carries to bring his total to 2003 in Weeb Ewbank's final game as Jets coach. He became the first to accumulate 200 yards in a game three times in a season. In O. J.'s post-game press conference, he brought the entire Electric Company to meet the media. Before he would field any questions, he introduced each of his teammates.

Scoring summary

Quarter	Time	Drive			Team	Scoring information	Score	
Quarter	Time	Plays	Yards	TOP	Team	Scoring information	BUF	NYJ
1					Bills	Jim Braxton 1-yard touchdown run, John Leypoldt kick good	7	0
1					Jets	Jerome Barkum 48-yard touchdown reception from Joe Namath, Bobby Howfield kick good	7	7
2					Bills	O. J. Simpson 13-yard touchdown run, John Leypoldt kick good	14	7
2					Bills	Punt returned 51 yards for touchdown by Bill Cahill, John Leypoldt kick good	21	7
3					Bills	Jim Braxton 1-yard touchdown run, John Leypoldt kick good	28	7
4					Bills	12-yard field goal by John Leypoldt	31	7
4					Bills	11-yard field goal by John Leypoldt	34	7
4					Jets	Rich Caster 16-yard touchdown reception from Joe Namath, Bobby Howfield kick good	34	14
"TOP" = time of possession. For other American football terms, see Glossary of American football.							34	14

== Awards and records ==
- O. J. Simpson, NFL MVP
- O. J. Simpson, NFL Offensive Player of the Year
- O. J. Simpson, Bert Bell Award
- O. J. Simpson, UPI AFL-AFC Player of the Year
- O. J. Simpson, AP Male Athlete of the Year
- O. J. Simpson, 1974 Pro Bowl Selection
- O. J. Simpson, All-Pro Selection
- Robert James, All-Pro Selection
- Robert James, 1974 Pro Bowl Selection
- Dave Foley, 1974 Pro Bowl Selection
- Reggie McKenzie, All-Pro Selection

=== Milestones ===
- O. J. Simpson, First 2,000 Yard Rushing Season in NFL History
- Single-season record: 143.1 rushing yards per game
- Single-season record: 2,243 yards from scrimmage
- Single-season record: 23 touchdowns
- Single-game record: 250 rushing yards
- First back-to-back 200-yard rushing games
- Single-game carries record (39)
- Consecutive 100-yard rushing games (7, ending with week 5).
- Single-season record: 3 200-yard games
- Single-season record: 11 100-yard games
