= Electric Company (football) =

1970s American-football offensive line

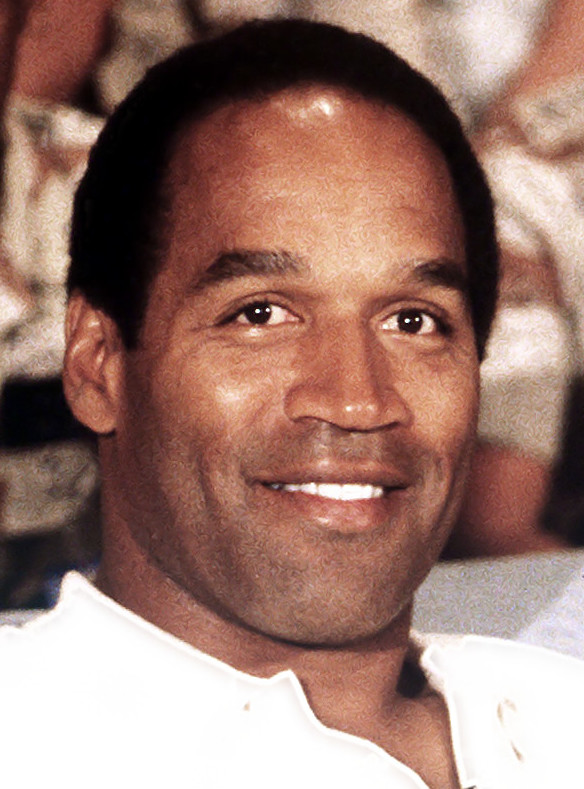
O. J. Simpson in 1990

The Electric Company was the offensive line of the Buffalo Bills during the mid-1970s that helped running back O. J. Simpson establish numerous National Football League (NFL) all-time records and earn numerous statistical titles. The nickname is sometimes more loosely used to refer to the Electric Company Offense for the Bills offensive unit or the Electric Company Buffalo Bills for the teams of this era.

== Background ==
The nickname for the offensive line was a reference to O. J. "Juice" Simpson. The offensive line earned its nickname for its ability to "turn on the juice," which was a metaphor for unleashing Simpson, who at the time was the best running back in the National Football League and the first running back to eclipse 2,000 yards rushing in a single season. Simpson gave the offensive line its nickname.

During the seasons between 1972 and 1976, Simpson established NFL records for single-season rushing yards (1973), single-season yards from scrimmage (1973), single-season rushing yards per game (1973), single-season touchdowns (1975), single-season 200-yard games (1973), consecutive 100-yard games (1972–73), single-game rushing yards (1973 & 1976) and career 200-rushing yard games. His single-season rushing yards per game and career 200-yard rushing games records still stand. Simpson was selected to the All-Pro First Team and the Pro Bowl during each of these five years, and won the rushing title in four of those five seasons. During this time period, Simpson became the only running back to twice have 200-yard rushing efforts in back-to-back games. Though the Bills would miss the playoffs during Simpson's milestone year where he rushed for 2,000 yards, he made an effort to introduce his offensive line during the final game's press conference. Simpson praised his offensive line's efforts and said he would only play "until all these guys get old so they won’t be able to help someone else break my records."

Although the Buffalo Bills had winning records during the 1973, 1974, and 1975 seasons, only the 1974 team made the NFL playoffs during the eight-team format era. However, they were eliminated by the eventual Super Bowl IX champion Pittsburgh Steelers. Simpson was elected to the Pro Football Hall of Fame in 1985 for his exploits. Right guard Joe DeLamielleure would be elected to the Hall of Fame as well in 2003.

== Members ==
Name	Pos.	Buffalo seasons	Accolades with Buffalo
Joe DeLamielleure	RG	1973–1979, 1983	Pro Football Hall of Fame (2003), 6× All-Pro (1974–1979), 5× Pro Bowl (1975–1979)
Dave Foley	LT	1972–1977	Pro Bowl (1973)
Donnie Green	RT	1971–1976	
Reggie McKenzie	LG	1972–1982	3× All-Pro (1973–1975)
Mike Montler	C	1973–1976	
Paul Seymour	TE	1973–1977	

Lou Saban was the head coach from 1972 into the 1976 season, when he resigned in mid-October before the sixth game; offensive line coach Jim Ringo was the interim head coach for the final nine games.

Other members of the Electric Company: third-year center Bruce Jarvis started the first eight games in 1973, but suffered a career-ending knee injury in November. During Simpson's first All-Pro season and first rushing title in 1972, Bob Penchion and Dick Hart were listed at right guard (DeLamielleure was selected in the 1973 NFL draft). Jan White was listed at tight end before Seymour's arrival in 1973. Also in 1972, Remi Prudhomme and John Matlock were listed at center. The beginning of the Electric Company era is often considered to be 1973, when the Bills moved to Rich Stadium (with AstroTurf), broke a skid of six consecutive losing seasons, and Simpson started breaking records.

When the nickname is expanded to include the whole offense, quarterback Joe Ferguson who was part of the Bills' 1973 NFL draft class along with DeLamielleure and Seymour is also considered to be a member. Fullback Jim Braxton, who became the starter in 1972, is also mentioned as part of the Electric Company. Even wide receivers Bob Chandler and J. D. Hill are associated with the Electric Company.

== Records and titles ==
Simpson's single-season rushing yards (2003 set in 1973), and single-season yards from scrimmage (2243 set in 1973) records were eclipsed in Eric Dickerson's 1984 season, but have not been eclipsed on a yards per game basis yet because they were set in 14 games. Simpson's 1975 single-seasons touchdowns record (23 set in 14 games) lasted until John Riggins posted 24 in 1983 in 16 games. However, the first person to post more touchdowns per game was Priest Holmes who totaled 27 in 2003. On September 16, 1973, Simpson broke Willie Ellison's 247-yard single game record with a 250-yard effort against the New York Jets. On November 25, 1976, Simpson broke his own single-game rushing yards record by posting 273 yards. Walter Payton then recorded a 275-yard effort less than a year later on November 20, 1977. Simpson's six career 200-yard games remains an NFL record. Earl Campbell and Ricky Williams have also posted back-to-back 200-yard games, but unlike Simpson they each only have done so once. When Simpson rushed for 100 yards in each of the first five games of the 1973 season it gave him seven consecutive 100-yard games, which was an NFL record. That record has been broken several times including back-to-back seasons when Payton took the record to 9 in 1985 and Marcus Allen increased it to 11 in 1986. Finally in 1997, Barry Sanders posted 14 consecutive 100-yard efforts.

O. J. Simpson 200-yard rushing game career log

Date	Opp	Result	Att	Yds	Y/A	TD
September 16, 1973	at New England Patriots	W 31-13	29	250	8.62	2
December 9, 1973	New England Patriots	W 37-13	22	219	9.95	1
December 16, 1973	at New York Jets	W 34-14	34	200	5.88	1
September 28, 1975	at Pittsburgh Steelers	W 30-21	28	227	8.11	1
November 25, 1976	at Detroit Lions	L 14-27	29	273	9.41	2
December 5, 1976	at Miami Dolphins	L 27-45	24	203	8.46	1

Simpson earned the NFL rushing titles in 1972, 1973, 1975 and 1976. He led the league in total touchdowns and total points scored in 1975, and he led in rushing touchdowns in both 1973 and 1975. He led the league in yards from scrimmage in 1973, 1975 and 1976 and in all-purpose yards in 1973 and 1976. Also in 1972, 1973 and 1975 he had the longest run in the NFL for the year, including a career-high 94-yard run in 1972.
