= Mike Montler =

American football player (1944–2018)

No. 64, 53, 52, 63
- Positions: Guard, Center, Tackle

Personal information
- Born: January 11, 1944; Columbus, Ohio, U.S.
- Died: December 13, 2018 (aged 74); Grand Junction, Colorado, U.S.
- Listed height: 6 ft 5 in (1.96 m)
- Listed weight: 254 lb (115 kg)

Career information
- High school: St. Mary's (Columbus)
- College: Colorado (1965-1968)
- NFL draft: 1969: 2nd round, 32nd overall pick

Career history
- Boston / New England Patriots (1969–1972); Buffalo Bills (1973–1976); Denver Broncos (1977); Detroit Lions (1978)

Awards and highlights
- Consensus All-American (1968); Second-team All-American (1967); 2× First-team All-Big Eight (1967, 1968); Second-team All-Big Eight (1966)

Career NFL/AFL statistics
- Games played: 123
- Games started: 116
- Fumble recoveries: 3
- Stats at Pro Football Reference

Michael R. Montler (January 11, 1944 – December 13, 2018) was an American professional football guard, center and offensive tackle who played ten seasons in the American Football League (AFL) and in the National Football League (NFL) for the Boston/New England Patriots, Buffalo Bills, Denver Broncos, and the Detroit Lions.

== University of Colorado ==
Montler played college football at the University of Colorado where he was All-American in 1968.

== Buffalo Bills ==
In 1973, his fifth year in the NFL, he became the starting center of the Bills, replacing Remi Prudhomme, splitting time with Bruce Jarvis, centering between Reggie McKenzie at left guard and Hall-of-Famer Joe DeLamielleure at right guard, for a fine 9–5 team, when O. J. Simpson became the first running back to rush for over 2,000 yards. In 1974, Montler won the job away from Jarvis, starting in all 14 games for another 9–5 season. The Bills lost ground in 1975 with a won-lost record of 8–6, despite having the best offense in the entire NFL with 420 points (30.0 points/game). For the second year in a row, Montler played all 14 games between McKenzie and DeLamielleure in the stout middle of the Bills offensive line. Although the same trio played together in all 14 games in 1976, the team sagged to 2–12, an offense worth 20th place in scoring and a defense 24th in points allowed. Montler was replaced by 5-year pro Willie Parker.

== Denver Broncos and Detroit Lions ==
Montler became the starting center for the Denver Broncos in 1977 for all 14 games and the Detroit Lions in 1978, but only in 4 games.

== Death ==
Montler died on December 13, 2018, aged 74 in Grand Junction, Colorado.
