= Bruce Jarvis =

American football player (born 1948)

No. 51
- Position: Center

Personal information
- Born: November 3, 1948 (age 78); Seattle, Washington, U.S.
- Listed height: 6 ft 7 in (2.01 m)
- Listed weight: 250 lb (113 kg)

Career information
- High school: Seattle (WA) Franklin
- College: Washington
- NFL draft: 1971: 3rd round, 53rd overall pick

Career history
- Buffalo Bills (1971–1974)

Awards and highlights
- Second-team All-Pac-8 (1970)

Career NFL statistics
- Games played: 24
- Games started: 23
- Stats at Pro Football Reference

Bruce Jarvis (born November 3, 1948) is an American former professional football player, an offensive lineman for four seasons for the Buffalo Bills of the National Football League (NFL).

== Early life ==
Born in Seattle, Jarvis graduated from its Franklin High School and played college football at the University of Washington in Seattle under head coach Jim Owens. As a senior center in 1970, he snapped the ball to sophomore quarterback Sonny Sixkiller.

== Buffalo Bills ==
Jarvis was chosen 53rd overall in the 1971 NFL draft by the Buffalo Bills, the first pick of the third round on January 28. As a rookie in 1971, Jarvis immediately became the starting center, replacing Frank Marchlewski. The Bill had an awful season, winning only 1 of 14 games, the worst offense in the entire NFL, with 184 points (13.1 points/game). Jarvis was injured in the opening game of 1972 season; he was succeeded by Remi Prudhomme and the Bills had a 4–9–1 (.321) season, their last on the natural grass of War Memorial Stadium.

In 1973, the Bills opened the new Rich Stadium in Orchard Park, with artificial turf, and Jarvis partly got his job back, starting 8 of 14 games. He split time with Mike Montler, centering between Reggie McKenzie at left guard and Joe DeLamielleure at right guard, for a much improved 9–5 (.643) team, when running back O. J. Simpson became the first to rush for over 2,000 yards. During Simpson's rushing success in the mid-1970s, the Bills' offensive line was nicknamed "The Electric Company," as they "turned on 'The Juice.'" Montler started all 14 games at center in 1974 and the Bills repeated at 9–5 and made the playoffs as a wild card team.

Jarvis retired from the NFL at age 26, during the Bills' training camp in July 1975.
