= Reggie McKenzie =

Reggie McKenzie may refer to:

- Reggie McKenzie (guard) (born 1950), offensive guard who played in the NFL, 1972–1984
- Reggie McKenzie (linebacker) (born 1963), linebacker and general manager in the NFL
