= Electric company =

Electric company may refer to:

- Electrical power industry
- Electric Company (band), an electronic music project of Brad Laner
- Electric Company (football)
- The Electric Company, a 1971-77 TV series
  - The Electric Company (2009 TV series), the 2009 reboot
