= Donnie Green =

American football player (1948–2019)

No. 74, 67
- Position: Offensive tackle

Personal information
- Born: July 12, 1948; Washington, D.C., U.S.
- Died: August 28, 2019 (aged 71); Hagerstown, Maryland, U.S.
- Listed height: 6 ft 7 in (2.01 m)
- Listed weight: 272 lb (123 kg)

Career information
- High school: Crestwood (Chesapeake, Virginia)
- College: Purdue
- NFL draft: 1971: 5th round, 107th overall pick

Career history
- Buffalo Bills (1971–1976); Philadelphia Eagles (1977); Detroit Lions (1978)

Awards and highlights
- Second-team All-Big Ten (1970)

Career NFL statistics
- Games played: 92
- Games started: 72
- Stats at Pro Football Reference

Donnie Gerald Green (July 12, 1948 – August 28, 2019) was an American professional football offensive lineman in the National Football League (NFL) for the Buffalo Bills, Philadelphia Eagles, and the Detroit Lions. He played college football at Purdue University and was selected in the fifth round of the 1971 NFL draft.

== Early life ==
Donnie Green was the sixth of nine children of Irene and James Green in Annapolis, Maryland, where he attended elementary school. At age 10, his mother died and Green moved to live with his father in Chesapeake, Virginia, where he played football and basketball at Crestwood High School.

== College career ==
Green was recruited by Purdue out of Crestwood high school in Virginia. Green was an AP and UPI All-American in 1970, and also was named a team captain during his senior year. The previous season, Green's blocking played a role in the team finishing with an 8–2 record under head coach Jack Mollenkopf. The quarterback on that team was Mike Phipps, who would be the first round draft choice of the Cleveland Browns in the next NFL draft. That 1969 team finished the season ranked number 18 in the AP poll. While at Purdue, Green majored in Physical Education. In Green's senior year, Purdue went 4–6 under head coach Bob DeMoss, with one of the highlights of the season being an upset 26–14 win over Stanford. Some of Green's teammates on that Purdue squad that would go on to play in the NFL include quarterback Gary Danielson, Running back Otis Armstrong and wide receiver Darryl Stingley.

== Professional career ==
Green was selected by the Buffalo Bills in the fifth round (107th player taken overall), one round after Jim Braxton, who'd be a back field mate of O. J. Simpson and part of the Bills famed "Electric Co." offense of the 1970s.

Green played in ten games his rookie season, starting nine of them as the Bills struggled to an 1–13 record under coach Harvey Johnson. After that season, Johnson was fired and Lou Saban was named as head coach. Saban made Green the full-time starter at right tackle, as the Bills improved to 4–9–1. The next season the Bills improved to 9–5 as Green along with Dave Foley, Reggie McKenzie, Bruce Jarvis, and Joe Delamielleure formed the line that helped Simpson rush for 2,003 yards in a season. In 1974, Green only started 10 games, but he recorded his only pass reception, a one yarder from quarterback Joe Ferguson in a 24–16 loss to the Miami Dolphins.

1975 would be Green's last as a full-time starter. He started all 14 games that year, eleven in 1976. He played for the Philadelphia Eagles in 1977 as a back-up, and spent 1978 seeing spot duty for the Detroit Lions. He retired after that season.

== Post career and death ==
Green struggled with life after professional football. He soon separated from his wife and battled drug use. He lost the lease on the home he was in and ended up living for a time in a shelter in Hagerstown, Maryland and worked there as a night monitor.

On August 28, 2019, the Buffalo Bills issued a press release that confirmed that Green had died, though an exact cause was not announced.
