= David Chapple =

American football player and artist (born 1947)

Dave Chapple
No. 6, 10
- Position: Punter

Personal information
- Born: March 30, 1947 (age 79); Arcadia, California, U.S.
- Listed height: 6 ft 0 in (1.83 m)
- Listed weight: 184 lb (83 kg)

Career information
- High school: Arcadia
- College: UC Santa Barbara
- NFL draft: 1969: 10th round, 250th overall pick

Career history
- Buffalo Bills (1971); Los Angeles Rams (1972–1974); New England Patriots (1974)

Awards and highlights
- Second-team All-Pro (1972); Pro Bowl (1972)

Career NFL statistics
- Punts: 162
- Punting yards: 6,519
- Longest punt: 70
- Stats at Pro Football Reference

David Thayer Chapple (born March 30, 1947) is an American artist and former professional football player. He played as a punter in the National Football League (NFL) between 1969 and 1975.

Born in 1947 in Palo Alto, California, Chapple was All American in football at University of California, Santa Barbara. Selected in the tenth round by the San Francisco 49ers in 1969 NFL/AFL draft, Chapple suffered a back injury and wasn't able to play for two years. He then signed with the Buffalo Bills in 1971, playing only a single game. Moving to the Los Angeles Rams the following year, Chapple was selected to the Pro Bowl after netting an average of 44.2 yards for the 1972 season, a statistic not bettered until 2007 by Shane Lechler. After another season and a half, he moved to the New England Patriots mid-season 1974, finishing his career with the remaining five games.

Chapple developed artistic talents at a young age, winning art contests and awards from grammar school. While earning his degree at the University of California at Santa Barbara, Chapple worked in the Santa Barbara Museum of Natural History as a bird taxidermist, which developed his interest in wildlife painting. He started his professional career as an artist in 1970 while playing professional football in Los Angeles, and turned his attention full-time to these artistic pursuits after retiring from football in 1975.

Primarily a contemporary oil painter in the influence of the early California impressionist landscape painters, Chapple has won numerous stamp contests for conservation groups and various state stamps for California, Kentucky, Utah and Idaho. His lifelong passion for golf has translated into painting commissions for Jack Nicklaus, ABC Sports, Fred Couples, U.S. Open, U.S. Senior Open, tour events, and various country clubs and golf courses around the country.

Further extending his artistic talents into sculpture in the 1980s, Chapple was commissioned by many corporations including the Chiron Corporation, DuPont Nature Center, and Ameriflex, among others, as well a life-size bronze of Florence Griffith Joyner at the Saddleback Memorial Medical Center in Laguna Hills, California.
