= Ken Ellis (American football) =

American football player (born 1947)

No. 48, 40, 28, 20
- Position: Cornerback

Personal information
- Born: September 27, 1947 (age 79); Woodbine, Georgia, U.S.
- Listed height: 5 ft 10 in (1.78 m)
- Listed weight: 190 lb (86 kg)

Career information
- High school: Ralph J. Bunche (Woodbine)
- College: Southern
- NFL draft: 1970: 4th round, 93rd overall pick

Career history
- Green Bay Packers (1970–1975); Houston Oilers (1976); Miami Dolphins (1976); Cleveland Browns (1977); Detroit Lions (1979); Los Angeles Rams (1979)

Awards and highlights
- First-team All-Pro (1972); Second-team All-Pro (1973); 2× Pro Bowl (1973, 1974); Green Bay Packers Hall of Fame

Career NFL statistics
- Games played: 115
- Interceptions: 22
- Touchdowns: 3
- Stats at Pro Football Reference

Kenneth Alfonzo Ellis (born September 27, 1947) is an American former professional football player who was a cornerback in the National Football League (NFL) from 1970 to 1979.

Ellis's football career began at Ralph Johnson Bunche High School in Woodbine, Georgia. Ellis then attended Southern University in Baton Rouge, Louisiana.

Ellis was selected in the fourth round (93rd pick) in the 1970 NFL draft by the Green Bay Packers. As a professional, Ellis played cornerback and safety for nine seasons. Speedy and talented, Ellis was chosen to play in the 1973 and 1974 Pro Bowl games. In addition, he was voted All-Pro in 1972 and 1973. He played in Super Bowl XIV as a member of the Los Angeles Rams. In 1998, he was inducted into the Green Bay Packers Hall of Fame.
