= Robert James (defensive back) =

American football player (born 1947)

No. 20
- Position: Cornerback

Personal information
- Born: July 4, 1947 (age 79); Murfreesboro, Tennessee, U.S.
- Listed height: 6 ft 1 in (1.85 m)
- Listed weight: 184 lb (83 kg)

Career information
- High school: Holloway (Murfreesboro)
- College: Fisk (1965–1968)
- NFL draft: 1969: undrafted

Career history
- Buffalo Bills (1969–1974)

Awards and highlights
- 2× First-team All-Pro (1973, 1974); 3× Pro Bowl (1972–1974); Buffalo Bills Wall of Fame

Career NFL/AFL statistics
- Interceptions: 9
- Interception yards: 38
- Fumble recoveries: 6
- Defensive touchdowns: 1
- Stats at Pro Football Reference

Robert Dematrice James (born July 7, 1947) is an American former professional football player who was a cornerback for six seasons with the Buffalo Bills of the American Football League (AFL) and the National Football League (NFL). James was a three-time Pro Bowler, in 1972, 1973 and 1974. He played college football for the Fisk Bulldogs and was signed by the Bills as an undrafted free agent after the 1969 NFL/AFL draft.

== High school ==
James attended Holloway High School in Murfreesboro, Tennessee.

== College career ==
James attended Fisk University, where he played college football for the Bulldogs as a defensive end, and also ran track and field. He graduated in 1969.

== Pro career ==
James suffered a severe knee injury in a preseason game on August 23, 1975, as a result of a hit by Lawrence McCutcheon that tore the ligaments of his right knee, necessitating operations. He tried to make a comeback target for 1976 and 1977, but realized the futility of his situation, and retired.

He was inducted into the Bills Wall of Fame in 1998, the first defensive back to receive the honor.

== Personal life ==
James returned to Middle Tennessee State for a master's degree. He soon became a teacher and assistant principal of Riverdale High in Murfreesboro, and later became a pastor.
