= Ronnie Carroll (American football) =

American football player (born 1949)

No. 63
- Position: Offensive guard

Personal information
- Born: April 11, 1949 (age 77); Galveston, Texas, U.S.
- Listed height: 6 ft 2 in (1.88 m)
- Listed weight: 265 lb (120 kg)

Career information
- High school: Spring Woods (Spring Branch, Texas)
- College: Arkansas (1968–1969); Sam Houston State (1970–1972)
- NFL draft: 1973: 12th round, 294th overall pick

Career history
- Buffalo Bills (1973)*; Houston Oilers (1974–1975); Saskatchewan Roughriders (1977)*
- * Offseason or practice squad member only

Awards and highlights
- NAIA All-American (1971)
- Stats at Pro Football Reference

Ronald Dean Carroll (born April 11, 1949) is an American former professional football offensive guard who played one season with the Houston Oilers of the National Football League (NFL). He played college football at Arkansas and Sam Houston State, and was selected by the Buffalo Bills in the 12th round of the 1973 NFL draft.

== Early life and college ==
Ronald Dean Carroll was born on April 11, 1949, in Galveston, Texas. He attended Spring Woods High School in Spring Branch, Texas.

Carroll first played college football for the Arkansas Razorbacks of the University of Arkansas. He was a member of the freshman team in 1968, and earned Southwest Conference all-freshman honors. He was listed as ineligible in 1969. Carroll was then a three-year letterman for the Sam Houston State Bearkats of Sam Houston State University from 1970 to 1972. He was an NAIA All-American in 1971, and garnered All-Lone Star Conference recognition each season from 1970 to 1972. Carroll was inducted into the school's athletics hall of fame in 1988.

== Professional career ==
Carroll was selected by the Buffalo Bills in the 12th round, with the 294th overall pick, of the 1973 NFL draft. He officially signed with the team on June 3. On August 26, 1973, it was reported that Carroll had been released by the Bills.

Carroll signed with the Houston Oilers in 1974. He played in all 14 games, starting five, for the Oilers during the 1974 season and recorded four fumble recoveries for 28 yards. He spent the 1975 season on injured reserve and was released by the Oilers in 1976.

Carroll signed with the Saskatchewan Roughriders of the Canadian Football League in 1977, but was later released.
