= Donnie Walker =

American football player (born 1950)

No. 26, 29
- Positions: Safety, return specialist

Personal information
- Born: December 26, 1950 (age 75); The Bronx, New York, U.S.
- Listed height: 6 ft 2 in (1.88 m)
- Listed weight: 180 lb (82 kg)

Career information
- High school: Lindenhurst (Lindenhurst, New York)
- College: Central State
- NFL draft: 1973: 4th round, 87th overall pick

Career history
- Buffalo Bills (1973–1974); Los Angeles Rams (1975)*; New York Giants (1975)*; New England Patriots (1975)*; Southern California Sun (1975); New York Jets (1975); Houston Oilers (1977)*
- * Offseason or practice squad member only
- Stats at Pro Football Reference

Donnie Mack Walker (born December 26, 1950) is an American former professional football safety who played in the National Football League (NFL) with the Buffalo Bills and New York Jets. He played college football for the Central State Marauders and was selected by the Bills in the fourth round of the 1973 NFL draft. He led the NFL in punt returns in 1974.

== Early life ==
Donnie Mack Walker was born on December 26, 1950, in The Bronx, New York. He attended Lindenhurst Senior High School in Lindenhurst, New York.

== College career ==
Walker enrolled at Central State University to play college football for the Marauders. He was at Central State from 1969 to 1972. He dropped out of school in spring 1973 after being stricken with a virus.

== Professional career ==
Walker was selected by the Buffalo Bills in the fourth round, with the 87th overall pick, of the 1973 NFL draft. He played basketball with Julius Erving for three weeks for training. Walker was still weakened by the virus by the time Bills training camp opened. He played in 11 games, starting one, as a safety/cornerback during the 1973 season, recording one interception for 22 yards and 25 punt returns for 210 yards. He led the team in punt returns and punt returns yards. Walker spent some time on the injured list due to a torn knee ligament. He played in all 14 regular season games, starting three, for the Bills at safety in 1974, totaling 43 punt returns for 384 yards, one kick returns for 20 yards, three fumbles, and one fumble recovery. He led the team in punt returns and punt return yards for the second consecutive year. Walker's 43 punt returns were also the most in the entire league that year. He appeared in one playoff game in a reserve role, returning two punts for 11 yards.

On January 28, 1975, Walker was traded to the Los Angeles Rams for a fifth-round draft pick. He was released on August 12 after the first game of the 1975 preseason.

Walker signed with the New York Giants on August 16, 1975, but was waived on August 27. He was claimed off waivers by the New England Patriots the next day. He was released on September 4, 1975, after the fourth of six preseason games.

Walker was then signed by the Southern California Sun of the World Football League (WFL). He recorded one interception for four yards, 14 punt returns for 110 yards, and one kick return for 31 yards before the WFL folded during the middle of the 1975 season.

Walker signed with the New York Jets on November 25, 1975. He appeared in two games, starting one, for the Jets at safety without recording any statistics. He was released on December 8, 1975.

Walker was signed by the Houston Oilers on March 8, 1977. On September 3, 1977, it was reported that Walker had been waived to make room for punter Rich Sanger.
