= Dave Foley (American football) =

American football player (born 1947)

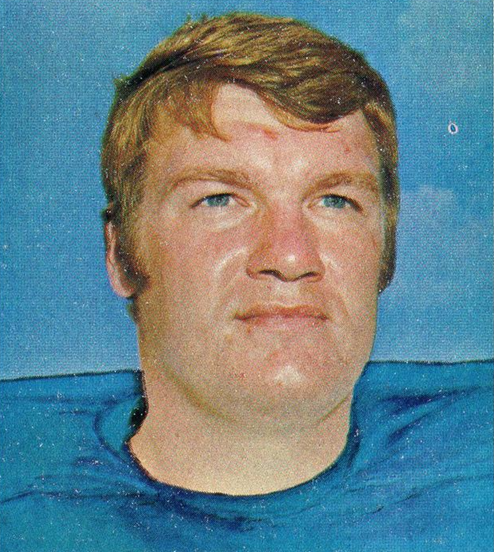

No. 70, 78
- Positions: Tackle, Center

Personal information
- Born: October 28, 1947 (age 79); Cincinnati, Ohio, U.S.
- Listed height: 6 ft 5 in (1.96 m)
- Listed weight: 255 lb (116 kg)

Career information
- High school: Roger Bacon (St. Bernard, Ohio)
- College: Ohio State (1965-1968)
- NFL draft: 1969: 1st round, 26th overall pick

Career history
- New York Jets (1969–1971); Buffalo Bills (1972–1977)

Awards and highlights
- Pro Bowl (1973); National champion (1968); Unanimous All-American (1968); First-team All-Big Ten (1968); Second-team All-Big Ten (1967)

Career NFL/AFL statistics
- Games played: 110
- Games started: 90
- Fumble recoveries: 4
- Stats at Pro Football Reference

David E. Foley (born October 28, 1947) is an American former professional football player who was an offensive lineman in the National Football League (NFL) for the New York Jets and Buffalo Bills.

Foley was a three-year starter playing college football at offensive tackle for the Ohio State Buckeyes under head coach Woody Hayes. Foley stated that he did not intend to come to Ohio State but was won over by charisma of coach Hayes and by seeing The Ohio State University Marching Band performing in Ohio Stadium. Foley played right tackle in 1966 and 1967, and moved to left tackle in 1968. Prior to his senior year, he was named a team co-captain, along with linebacker Dirk Worden. That year the Buckeyes finished the season undefeated and were voted consensus national champions after defeating the University of Southern California in the 1969 Rose Bowl.

Foley was a consensus All-America selection in 1968. He was also a three-year Academic All-American. He was elected to the Ohio State Varsity O Hall of Fame in 1984.

Foley was selected in the first round of the 1969 NFL/AFL draft by the New York Jets. After two years with the Jets he was traded to the Buffalo Bills, where he played for the remainder of his professional career. A Pro Bowl selection in 1973, he was the starting right tackle with the Bills' Electric Company.

While still an active player in 1972, he started Dave Foley & Associates which originally specialized in life insurance and health group benefits. Retirement plan third-party administration was added to its operations in 1986. The company expanded further in 1999 and was renamed Foley Benefits Group, LLC. His brother, Tim Foley, works at the business and is also a 1977 National Champion for the Notre Dame Fighting Irish as well as a former professional offensive tackle. Foley Benefits Group, LLC is based in Springfield, Ohio.
