= 1973 All-Pro Team =

Official list of the best NFL players in 1973

The following is a list of players that were named to the Associated Press All-Pro Team, the Newspaper Enterprise Association All-Pro team and the Pro Football Writers Association, and Pro Football Weekly All-Pro teams in 1973. Both first- and second- teams are listed for the AP, NEA, and PFWA teams. These are the four All-Pro teams that are included in the Total Football II: The Official Encyclopedia of the National Football League and compose the Consensus All-pro team for 1973.

== Teams ==
Offense
Position	First team	Second team
Quarterback	John Hadl, Los Angeles Rams (AP, PFWA, PFW)	Fran Tarkenton, Minnesota Vikings (AP-2, PFWA-2)
Running back	O. J. Simpson, Buffalo Bills (AP, NEA, PFWA, PFW); Larry Csonka, Miami Dolphins (AP, PFW); Calvin Hill, Dallas Cowboys (PFWA); John Brockington, Green Bay Packers (NEA)	Lawrence McCutcheon, Los Angeles Rams (NEA-2); Larry Csonka, Miami Dolphins (NEA-2, PFWA-2); John Brockington, Green Bay Packers (AP-2, PFWA-2)
Wide receiver	Harold Jackson, Los Angeles Rams (AP, NEA, PFWA, PFW); Harold Carmichael, Philadelphia Eagles (PFWA, PFW); Paul Warfield, Miami Dolphins (AP); John Gilliam, Minnesota Vikings (NEA)	Harold Carmichael, Philadelphia Eagles (AP-2, NEA-2); Paul Warfield, Miami Dolphins (PFWA-2, NEA-2); John Gilliam, Minnesota Vikings (AP-2, PFWA-2)
Tight end	Charles Young, Philadelphia Eagles (AP, PFWA, PFW); Riley Odoms, Denver Broncos (NEA)	Charles Young, Philadelphia Eagles (NEA-2); Riley Odoms, Denver Broncos (AP-2, PFWA-2)
Tackle	Ron Yary, Minnesota Vikings (AP, PFWA, PFW); Rayfield Wright, Dallas Cowboys (AP, PFWA); George Kunz, Atlanta Falcons (NEA, PFW); Art Shell, Oakland Raiders (NEA)	Charlie Cowan, Los Angeles Rams (AP-2, PFWA-2); Ron Yary, Minnesota Vikings (NEA-2); Rayfield Wright, Dallas Cowboys (NEA-2); George Kunz, Atlanta Falcons (AP-2, PFWA-2)
Guard	Larry Little, Miami Dolphins (AP, NEA, PFWA, PFW); Reggie McKenzie, Buffalo Bills (AP, PFWA); Tom Mack, Los Angeles Rams (PFW); Joe Scibelli, Los Angeles Rams (NEA)	Gene Upshaw, Oakland Raiders (AP-2, NEA-2); Gale Gillingham, Green Bay Packers (PFWA-2); Reggie McKenzie, Buffalo Bills (NEA-2); Tom Mack, Los Angeles Rams (AP-2, PFWA-2)
Center	Forrest Blue, San Francisco 49ers (AP, PFWA, PFW); Bob Johnson, Cincinnati Bengals (NEA)	Jim Langer, Miami Dolphins (AP-2); Len Hauss, Washington Redskins (PFWA-2); Jack Rudnay, Kansas City Chiefs (NEA-2)

Special teams
Position	First team	Second team
Kicker	Garo Yepremian, Miami Dolphins (AP, NEA, PFWA, PFW)	Roy Gerela, Pittsburgh Steelers (AP-2, NEA-2, PFWA-2)
Punter	Ray Guy, Oakland Raiders (NEA, PFWA, PFW)	Jerrel Wilson, Kansas City Chiefs (PFWA-2, NEA-2)

Defense
Position	First team	Second team
Defensive end	Claude Humphrey, Atlanta Falcons (AP, PFWA, PFW); Bill Stanfill, Miami Dolphins (PFWA, NEA); Carl Eller, Minnesota Vikings (AP, PFW)	Jack Youngblood, Los Angeles Rams (AP-2, PFWA-2); Elvin Bethea, Houston Oilers (NEA-2); John Zook, Atlanta Falcons (NEA-2); Bill Stanfill, Miami Dolphins (AP-2); Carl Eller, Minnesota Vikings (PFWA-2)
Defensive tackle	Joe Greene, Pittsburgh Steelers (AP, NEA, PFWA, PFW); Alan Page, Minnesota Vikings (AP, NEA-DE, PFWA, PFW); Mike Reid, Cincinnati Bengals (NEA)	Merlin Olsen, Los Angeles Rams (AP-2); Paul Smith, Denver Broncos (NEA-2, PFWA-2); Manny Fernandez, Miami Dolphins (NEA-2); Mike Reid, Cincinnati Bengals (AP-2, PFWA-2)
Middle linebacker	Lee Roy Jordan, Dallas Cowboys (NEA, PFWA, PFW); Willie Lanier, Kansas City Chiefs (AP)	Lee Roy Jordan, Dallas Cowboys (AP-2); Willie Lanier, Kansas City Chiefs (NEA-2, PFWA-2)
Outside linebacker	Chris Hanburger, Washington Redskins (AP, NEA, PFW); Dave Wilcox, San Francisco 49ers (NEA, PFWA, PFW); Isiah Robertson, Los Angeles Rams (AP, PFWA)	Jack Ham, Pittsburgh Steelers (AP-2, NEA-2, PFWA-2); Chris Hanburger, Washington Redskins (PFWA-2); Dave Wilcox, San Francisco 49ers (AP-2)
Cornerback	Willie Brown, Oakland Raiders (AP, NEA, PFWA, PFW); Mel Renfro, Dallas Cowboys (NEA, PFWA, PFW); Robert James, Buffalo Bills (AP)	Lem Barney, Detroit Lions (AP-2, NEA-2, PFWA-2); Ken Ellis, Green Bay Packers (PFWA-2); Clarence Scott, Cleveland Browns (NEA-2); Mel Renfro, Dallas Cowboys (AP-2)
Safety	Dick Anderson, Miami Dolphins (AP, NEA, PFWA, PFW); Jake Scott, Miami Dolphins (AP, PFWA); Bill Bradley, Philadelphia Eagles (NEA); Mike Wagner, Pittsburgh Steelers (PFW)	Ken Houston, Washington Redskins (AP-2, NEA-2, PFWA-2); Jake Scott, Miami Dolphins (NEA-2); Bill Bradley, Philadelphia Eagles (AP-2, PFWA-2)

== Key ==
AP = Associated Press All-Pro team; AP-2 Associated Press Second-team All-Pro; PFWA = Pro Football Writers Association All-Pro team; NEA = Newspaper Enterprise Association All-Pro team.; NEA-2 Newspaper Enterprise Association Second-team All-Pro; PFW = Pro Football Weekly All-Pro team; t = players tied in votes.
