= 1972 All-Pro Team =

Official list of the best NFL players in 1972

The following is a list of players that were named to the Associated Press All-Pro Team, the Newspaper Enterprise Association All-Pro team and the Pro Football Writers Association, and Pro Football Weekly All-Pro teams in 1972. Both first- and second- teams are listed for the AP, NEA, and PFWA teams. These are the four All-Pro teams that are included in the Total Football II: The Official Encyclopedia of the National Football League and compose the Consensus All-pro team for 1972.

== Teams ==
Offense
Position	First team	Second team
Quarterback	Earl Morrall, Miami Dolphins (AP); Joe Namath, New York Jets (PFWA)	Joe Namath, New York Jets (AP-2); Daryle Lamonica, Oakland Raiders (PFWA-2)
Running back	Larry Brown, Washington Redskins (AP, NEA, PFWA, PFW); O. J. Simpson, Buffalo Bills (AP, NEA, PFWA); Larry Csonka, Miami Dolphins (PFW)	Franco Harris, Pittsburgh Steelers (AP-2, NEA-2); John Brockington, Green Bay Packers (NEA-2); Ron Johnson, New York Giants (PFWA-2); Larry Csonka, Miami Dolphins (AP-2, PFWA-2)
Wide receiver	Fred Biletnikoff, Oakland Raiders (AP, NEA, PFW); Gene Washington, San Francisco 49ers (AP, PFWA, PFW); Paul Warfield, Miami Dolphins (NEA); Otis Taylor, Kansas City Chiefs (PFWA)	Harold Jackson, Philadelphia Eagles (AP-2, NEA-2, PFWA-2); Fred Biletnikoff, Oakland Raiders (PFWA-2); Gene Washington, San Francisco 49ers (NEA-2); Paul Warfield, Miami Dolphins (AP-2)
Tight end	Ted Kwalick, San Francisco 49ers (AP, NEA, PFW); Bob Tucker, New York Giants (PFWA)	Jim Mitchell, Atlanta Falcons (NEA-2); Ted Kwalick, San Francisco 49ers (PFWA-2); Bob Tucker, New York Giants (AP-2)
Tackle	Rayfield Wright, Dallas Cowboys (AP, NEA, PFWA, PFW); Bob Brown, Oakland Raiders (PFWA, PFW); Ron Yary, Minnesota Vikings (AP); George Kunz, Atlanta Falcons (NEA)	Winston Hill, New York Jets (NEA-2, PFWA-2); Rockne Freitas, Detroit Lions (AP-2); Bob Brown, Oakland Raiders (AP-2); Ron Yary, Minnesota Vikings (NEA-2, PFWA-2)
Guard	Larry Little, Miami Dolphins (AP, NEA, PFWA, PFW); John Niland, Dallas Cowboys (AP, PFW); Blaine Nye, Dallas Cowboys (NEA); Gene Upshaw, Oakland Raiders (PFWA)	Tom Mack, Los Angeles Rams (AP-2, NEA-2); Bruce Van Dyke, Pittsburgh Steelers (PFWA-2); John Niland, Dallas Cowboys (NEA-2, PFWA-2); Gene Upshaw, Oakland Raiders (AP-2)
Center	Forrest Blue, San Francisco 49ers (AP, PFWA, PFW); Len Hauss, Washington Redskins (NEA)	Jim Otto, Oakland Raiders (AP-2); Forrest Blue, San Francisco 49ers (NEA-2); Len Hauss, Washington Redskins (PFWA-2)

Special teams
Position	First team	Second team
Kicker	Chester Marcol, Green Bay Packers (AP, NEA, PFWA, PFW)	Roy Gerela, Pittsburgh Steelers (AP-2, NEA-2, PFWA-2)
Punter	Jerrel Wilson, Kansas City Chiefs (PFWA, PFW); Don Cockroft, Cleveland Browns (NEA)	Jerrel Wilson, Kansas City Chiefs (NEA-2); Dave Chapple, Los Angeles Rams (PFWA-2)

Defense
Position	First team	Second team
Defensive end	Claude Humphrey, Atlanta Falcons (AP, NEA, PFWA, PFW); Jack Gregory, New York Giants (NEA, PFWA, PFW); Bill Stanfill, Miami Dolphins (AP)	Deacon Jones, San Diego Chargers (NEA-2); Carl Eller, Minnesota Vikings (AP-2); Coy Bacon, Los Angeles Rams (PFWA-2); Larry Hand, Detroit Lions (NEA-2); Jack Gregory, New York Giants (AP-2); Verlon Biggs, Washington Redskins (PFWA-2)
Defensive tackle	Joe Greene, Pittsburgh Steelers (AP, NEA, PFWA, PFW); Mike Reid, Cincinnati Bengals (AP, NEA, PFWA); Bob Lilly, Dallas Cowboys (PFW)	Alan Page, Minnesota Vikings (AP-2, NEA-2, PFWA-2); Bob Lilly, Dallas Cowboys (AP-2, NEA-2, PFWA-2)
Middle linebacker	Dick Butkus, Chicago Bears (AP, NEA, PFWA); Willie Lanier, Kansas City Chiefs (PFW)	Nick Buoniconti, Miami Dolphins (AP-2, PFWA-2); Willie Lanier, Kansas City Chiefs (AP-2)
Outside linebacker	Chris Hanburger, Washington Redskins (AP, NEA, PFWA, PFW); Dave Wilcox, San Francisco 49ers (AP, NEA, PFWA, PFW)	Andy Russell, Pittsburgh Steelers (AP-2, NEA-2, PFWA-2); Ted Hendricks, Baltimore Colts (AP-2, NEA-2); Jack Ham, Pittsburgh Steelers (PFWA-2)
Cornerback	Jimmy Johnson, San Francisco 49ers (AP, NEA, PFWA, PFW); Willie Brown, Oakland Raiders (NEA, PFWA, PFW); Ken Ellis, Green Bay Packers (AP)	Mel Renfro, Dallas Cowboys (AP-2, NEA-2, PFWA-2); Pat Fischer, Washington Redskins (NEA-2); Willie Brown, Oakland Raiders (AP-2); Ken Ellis, Green Bay Packers (PFWA-2)
Safety	Bill Bradley, Philadelphia Eagles (AP, NEA, PFWA, PFW); Dick Anderson, Miami Dolphins (AP, NEA, PFWA); Jake Scott, Miami Dolphins (PFW)	Ken Houston, Houston Oilers (NEA-2, PFWA-2); Paul Krause, Minnesota Vikings (AP-2); Jake Scott, Miami Dolphins (AP-2, NEA-2, PFWA-2)

== Key ==
AP = Associated Press All-Pro team; AP-2 Associated Press Second-team All-Pro; PFWA = Pro Football Writers Association All-Pro team; NEA = Newspaper Enterprise Association All-Pro team.; NEA-2 Newspaper Enterprise Association Second-team All-Pro; PFW = Pro Football Weekly All-Pro team; t = players tied in votes.
