= 2,000-yard club =

American football achievement designation

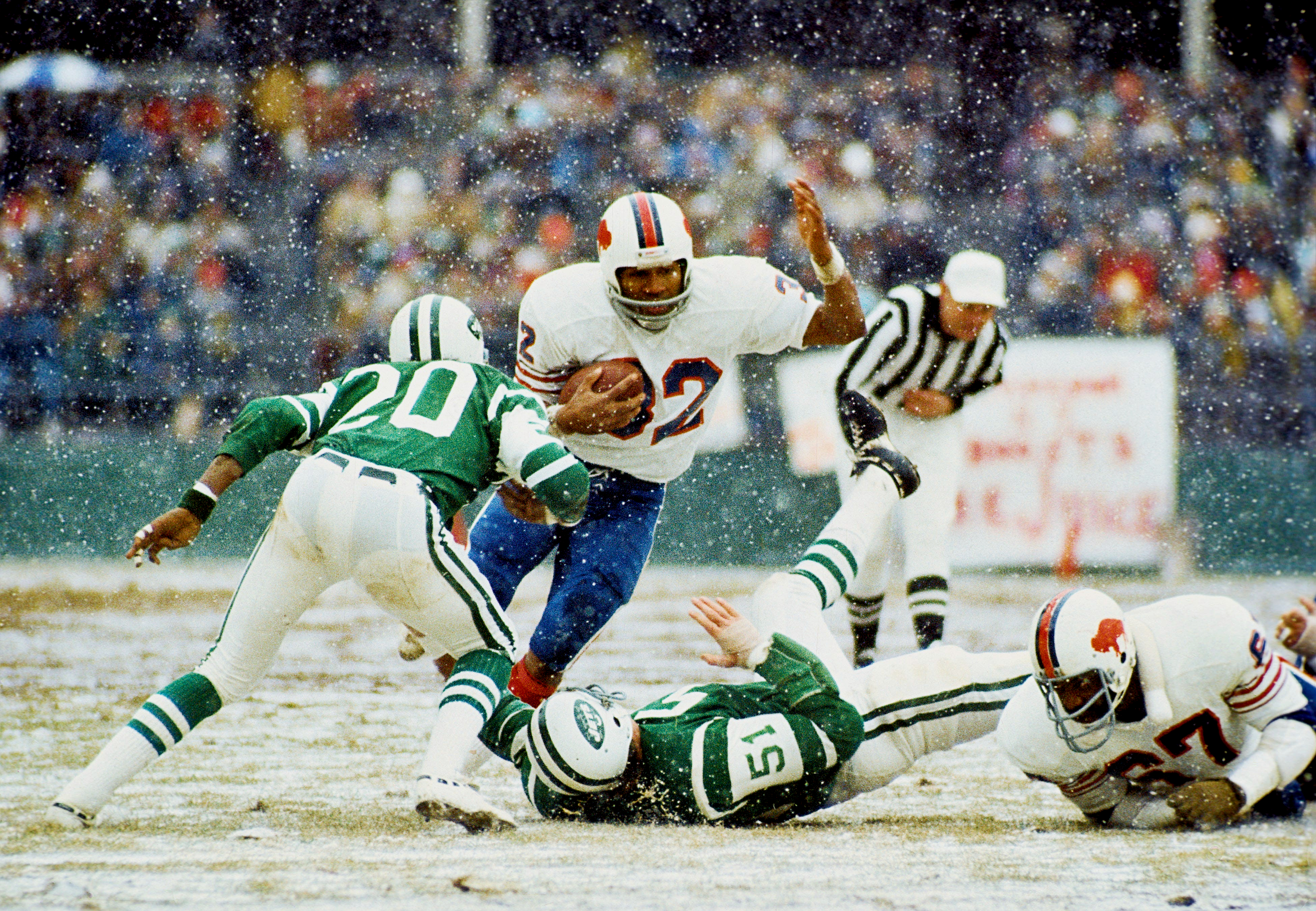
Buffalo Bills running back O. J. Simpson, who rushed for 2,003 yards in 1973, the first NFL player to exceed 2,000 yards in a season and the only player to do so in a 14-game season

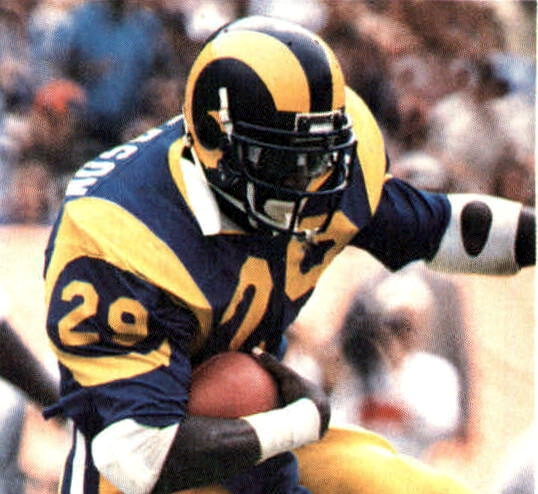
Eric Dickerson, a Los Angeles Rams running back and the all-time NFL season rushing leader with 2,105 yards in 1984

The 2,000-yard club is a group of nine National Football League (NFL) running backs as of 2025 who have rushed for 2,000 yards or more in a regular season since the league's 1920 founding. These nine rushing seasons rank as the highest single-season rushing totals in NFL history, and reaching the 2,000-yard mark is considered a significant achievement for running backs. No running back has yet achieved this feat twice.

== History ==
The first 2,000-yard season was recorded in 1973 by Buffalo Bills running back O. J. Simpson, who is the only player ever to have surpassed 2,000 yards in a 14-game season; all others occurred in 16 or 17-game seasons. Simpson finished with 2,003 rushing yards, averaging six yards per carry and an NFL-record 143.1 rushing yards per game. In 1983, Los Angeles Rams running back Eric Dickerson broke the single-season rookie rushing record, recording the second 2,000-yard season in 1984. Dickerson rushed for 2,105 yards, the current NFL rushing record, averaging 131.6 rushing yards per game.

Detroit Lions running back Barry Sanders recorded the third 2,000-yard season in 1997, rushing for 2,053 yards. At the age of 29, Sanders was the oldest back to surpass 2,000 yards. Sanders had opened the season with only 53 yards through two games, but ran for 100 yards or more in each of the last 14 games of the season and averaged 6.1 yards per carry during the season. In 1998, Denver Broncos running back Terrell Davis became the fourth player to rush for over 2,000 yards, running for 2,008 yards. Davis also recorded 21 rushing touchdowns in his 2,000-yard season, the only 2,000 yard rusher to do so. Davis had reached the 1,000-yard mark only seven games into the season.

Baltimore Ravens running back Jamal Lewis surpassed 2,000 yards in the 2003 season, recording 2,066 yards over the course of the season. 500 of these yards were recorded in two games against the Cleveland Browns, with Lewis rushing for a then-NFL record 295 yards in the first and recording 205 rushing yards in the second. Tennessee Titans running back Chris Johnson ran for 2,006 yards in 2009, averaging 5.6 yards per carry, and also recorded an NFL-record 2,509 yards from scrimmage. Minnesota Vikings back Adrian Peterson is the third most recent player to have surpassed 2,000 yards rushing, having finished the 2012 season with 2,097 yards rushing, just 8 yards short of Dickerson's record. Peterson had torn two ligaments in his left knee the previous year, making him the only player to have surpassed 2,000 yards after having reconstructive knee surgery the prior season. Titans running back Derrick Henry reached the mark on January 3, 2021, making the Titans the first franchise to have multiple 2,000-yard rushers. Eagles running back Saquon Barkley reached 2,000 yards on December 29, 2024 in the 16th game of the Eagles’ NFL season. To date, Davis and Barkley are the only members of the 2,000 yard club to win a Super Bowl in the year that they rushed for 2,000 yards, with Barkley breaking Davis' 2,476 record regular and post-season rushing yards, setting a record of 2,504 total rushing yards in regular and post-season. Lewis is the only other 2,000-yard rusher to win a Super Bowl at any point in their career, and remains the only one to be both a Super Bowl Champion and College Football National Champion.

Out of the nine players to have recorded a 2,000-yard rushing season, all but Dickerson won the AP NFL Offensive Player of the Year Award the year that they rushed for 2,000 yards, although Dickerson would go on to win the award after the 1986 NFL season. Simpson, Sanders, Davis, and Peterson also won the AP Most Valuable Player (MVP) award. Simpson, Dickerson, Sanders, and Davis are each members of the Pro Football Hall of Fame, which "honor[s] individuals who have made outstanding contributions to professional football"; Lewis and Johnson have not been voted in, Peterson will be eligible for the class of 2027 (barring a return), and Henry and Barkley remain active as players.

== 2,000-yard rushers ==
Key

Symbol	Meaning
GP	Number of games the player played in the season in which they reached the milestone.
Att	Total rushing attempts
Yds	Total rushing yards
TD	Total rushing touchdowns
Y/A	Rushing yards per attempt
Y/G	Rushing yards per game
Top Game	Most single game rushing yards (in season)
Fum	Total fumbles
MVP	AP Most Valuable Player
OPOY	AP Offensive Player of the Year
HOF	Pro Football Hall of Fame member
^{*}	Active NFL player
N/E	Not yet eligible for the Pro Football Hall of Fame (Note: To be eligible for induction into the Pro Football Hall of Fame, the candidate must have been retired for at least five years.)

List of players with 2,000 or more rushing yards in a regular season
Season	Player	Team	GP	Att	Yds	TDs	Y/A	Y/G	Top Game	Fum	MVP	OPOY	HOF	Active	Ref
1973	O. J. Simpson	Buffalo Bills	14	332	2,003	12	6.0	143.1	250	7	Yes	Yes	1985	No	
1984	Eric Dickerson	Los Angeles Rams	16	379	2,105	14	5.6	131.6	215	14	No	No	1999	No	
1997	Barry Sanders	Detroit Lions	16	335	2,053	11	6.1	128.3	216	3	Yes (Note: Sanders was named co-MVP of the 1997 season with Brett Favre.)	Yes	2004	No	
1998	Terrell Davis	Denver Broncos	16	392	2,008	21	5.1	125.5	208	2	Yes	Yes	2017	No	
2003	Jamal Lewis	Baltimore Ravens	16	387	2,066	14	5.3	129.1	295	8	No	Yes	No	No	
2009	Chris Johnson	Tennessee Titans	16	358	2,006	14	5.6	125.4	228	3	No	Yes	No	No	
2012	Adrian Peterson	Minnesota Vikings	16	348	2,097	12	6.0	131.1	212	4	Yes	Yes	N/E	No	
2020	Derrick Henry	Tennessee Titans	16	378	2,027	17	5.4	126.7	250	3	No	Yes	N/E	Yes	
2024	Saquon Barkley	Philadelphia Eagles	16 (Note: Barkley surpassed 2,000 rushing yards in a 17-game season, but did not play in the 17th game, accomplishing this feat in only 16 games.)	345	2,005	13	5.8	125.3	255	2	No	Yes	N/E	Yes	

== Notes ==
Notes

Footnotes

== General references ==
- "AP MVP winners". Pro Football Reference. Archived from the original on March 5, 2013.
- "AP Offensive Player of the Year winners". Pro Football Reference. Archived from the original on March 5, 2013.
