= Remi Prudhomme =

American football player (1942–1990)

No. 65, 68, 78
- Positions: Center, guard, defensive end, defensive tackle

Personal information
- Born: April 24, 1942; Opelousas, Louisiana, U.S.
- Died: December 6, 1990 (aged 48); Opelousas, Louisiana, U.S.
- Listed height: 6 ft 4 in (1.93 m)
- Listed weight: 250 lb (113 kg)

Career information
- High school: Opelousas
- College: LSU
- NFL draft: 1964: 3rd round, 37th overall pick
- AFL draft: 1964: 14th round, 108th overall pick

Career history
- Buffalo Bills (1966–1967); Kansas City Chiefs (1968–1970); New Orleans Saints (1971–1972); Buffalo Bills (1972); Portland Storm (1974)

Awards and highlights
- Super Bowl champion (IV); AFL champion (1969); First-team All-American (1964); First-team All-SEC (1964)

Career NFL/AFL statistics
- Games played: 79
- Games started: 15
- Fumble recoveries: 1
- Stats at Pro Football Reference

Joseph Remi Prudhomme (April 24, 1942 – December 6, 1990) was an American professional football offensive lineman in the National Football League (NFL) and the American Football League (AFL). He attended Louisiana State University, where he was an All-American defensive tackle in 1964 for the LSU Tigers.

== Professional career ==
Even though he was injured in 1965 and thus did not dress for a regular season game for the Bills, he was given an American Football League Championship ring for the 1965 season.

Prudhomme played for the AFL's Kansas City Chiefs in 1968 and 1969, thus also earning a 1969 AFL Championship ring and a ring from the Chiefs victory over the NFL's Minnesota Vikings in the fourth and final AFL-NFL World Championship Game, better known as Super Bowl IV. In that game, he recovered a Vikings fumble at the Minnesota 19 to set up Mike Garrett's five-yard touchdown run. He later played for the NFL's New Orleans Saints in 1971 and 1972.

In 1972, Prudhomme became the starting center for the Bills, playing in 6 of 14 games, splitting time with John Matlock and replacing Bruce Jarvis.

== See also ==
- List of American Football League players
