= Reception (gridiron football) =

Term in gridiron football

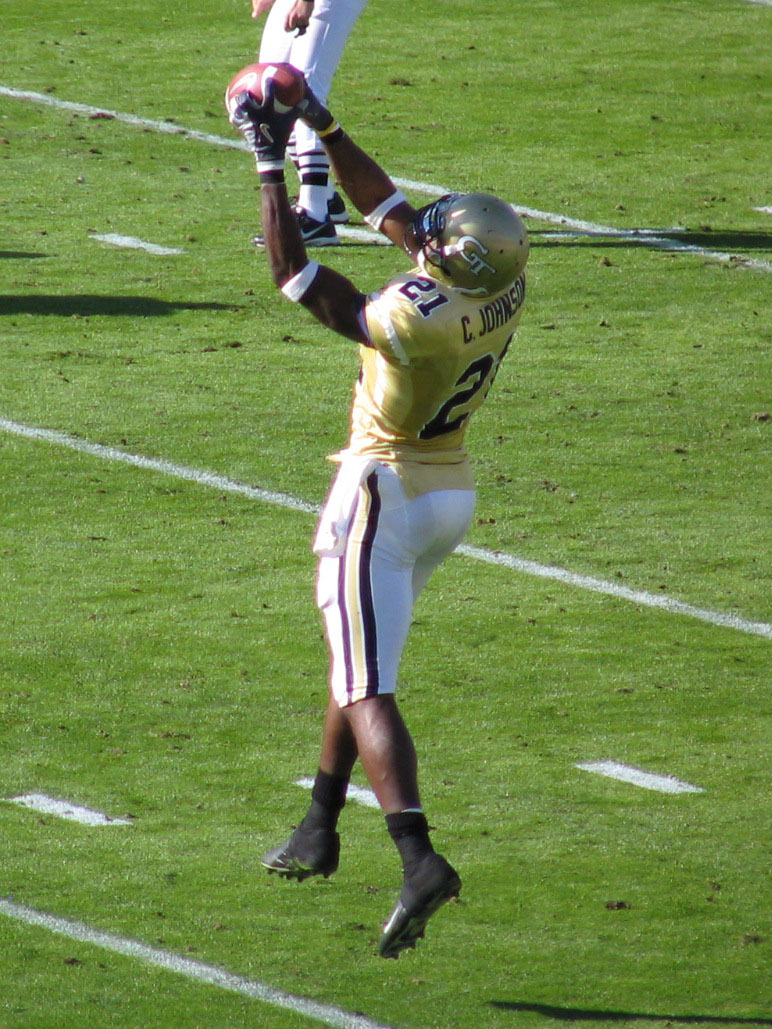
Calvin Johnson making a reception while playing at Georgia Tech.

In gridiron football, a reception, also known informally as a catch, is part of a passing play in which a player in bounds successfully catches (receives) a forward pass thrown from their team's quarterback behind the line of scrimmage. In most cases, after making the catch, the receiver will then proceed to run towards the opposing end zone carrying the ball and try to score a touchdown, unless the play ends due to him being downed or forced out of bounds. Yardage gained from the passing play are credited to the catcher as his receiving yards.

If the pass is not caught by anyone, it is called an incomplete pass or simply an "incompletion". If the pass is caught by an opposing player, it is called an interception.

A reception should not be confused with a lateral, also known as a lateral pass or backward pass, which is a legal pass anywhere on the field. In a lateral pass, the ball is thrown backwards or sideways to a teammate with no vector of the pass trajectory towards the opponent's goal line.

== See also ==
- Glossary of American football terms
- List of NFL annual receptions leaders
