= Holloway High School =

School in Murfreesboro, Tennessee, US

Coordinates: 35.8386°N 86.3843°W

Holloway High School is a choice school in Murfreesboro, Tennessee. It had been a school for African American students until it was closed after integration. It was named for E. C. Holloway who advocated for its creation and was dedicated in 1929. It served African American students from Murfreesboro and the surrounding county.

In 2025, the student body was about 40 percent white, 20 percent black and 20 percent Hispanic.

It is at 619 South Highland Avenue.

== History ==
S. G. Greene was its principal from 1928 to 1949; J. H. Stevens from 1949 to 1964; and Collier R. Woods from 1964 to 1968. Trojans are the school's mascot. Clubs and organizations it has had include Glee Club, Office Workers, Library Club, Assembly Guides, Cheerleaders, New Farmers of America, New Homemakers of America, Band, Le Cercie Francais (French circle), and National Honor Society. Publications include The Flash, Holloway Highlights, and The Trojanite.

It closed in 1968 after integration. The school building was used for educational programs. Part of it was demolished. It is now a "choice school" offering a smaller school atmosphere.

It played football against Davidson Academy in Tullahoma.

== Alumni ==
- Robert W. Scales
