= Bob Kampa =

American football player (born 1951)

Robert Eugene Kampa (born April 26, 1951, in San Francisco, California) was an American lineman for two years in the NFL. In his amateur years, he played at Gilroy High School then attended Gavilan College before transferring to University of California, Berkeley. He was drafted by the Buffalo Bills in the third round (77th pick overall) of the 1973 NFL draft. He played for the Bills for one year and the Denver Broncos in his second year. Kampa ended his career in the NFL and pursued his graduate studies at California State University, Long Beach, earning his teaching credential. Kampa went on to coach football and teach P.E. at his alma mater, before retiring in 2015. He is inducted into the school's Hall of Fame. Bob resides in Santa Cruz County with his wife, Lori, and has two children: Joshua Kampa and Katelyn (Kampa) Lentsch.

Excerpt from The 1973 Buffalo Bills Roster Included Many More Players Than Just O.J. Simpson: "The defensive linemen team featured college football superstar Walt Patulski. When he was drafted by the Buffalo Bills in 1972, he was the number one overall pick for that year. His inclusion on the team, as well as fellow defensive linemen Mike Kadish, Bob Kampa, Jerry Patton, Earl Edwards, and Steve Okoniewski, surely played a big role in the Buffalo Bills' success."
