= John Matlock =

American football player (1944–2012)

- Matlock in 1972

No. 57, 53
- Position: Center

Personal information
- Born: October 19, 1944; Louisville, Kentucky, U.S.
- Died: January 13, 2012 (aged 67); Jupiter, Florida, U.S.
- Listed height: 6 ft 4 in (1.93 m)
- Listed weight: 249 lb (113 kg)

Career information
- High school: St. Edward (OH)
- College: Miami (FL)
- NFL draft: 1967: undrafted

Career history
- New York Jets (1967); Cincinnati Bengals (1968); Atlanta Falcons (1970–1971); Buffalo Bills (1972); Birmingham Vulcans (1974-1975)

Career NFL/AFL statistics
- Games played: 59
- Starts: 4
- Fumble recoveries: 1
- Stats at Pro Football Reference

John James Matlock III (October 19, 1944 — January 13, 2012) was an American football center who played for the New York Jets, Cincinnati Bengals, Atlanta Falcons, and Buffalo Bills of the National Football League (NFL). He also played for Birmingham Vulcans of the World Football League (WFL). He played college football at University of Miami.
