= Reggie McKenzie (guard) =

American football player (born 1950)

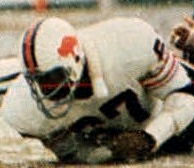
- McKenzie playing for the Buffalo Bills in 1973

No. 67
- Position: Guard

Personal information
- Born: July 27, 1950 (age 76); Detroit, Michigan, U.S.
- Listed height: 6 ft 4 in (1.93 m)
- Listed weight: 255 lb (116 kg)

Career information
- High school: Highland Park (Highland Park, Michigan)
- College: Michigan
- NFL draft: 1972: 2nd round, 27th overall pick

Career history
- Buffalo Bills (1972–1982); Seattle Seahawks (1983–1984)

Awards and highlights
- First-team All-Pro (1973); 2× Second-team All-Pro (1974, 1975); Consensus All-American (1971); 2× First-team All-Big Ten (1970, 1971)

Career NFL statistics
- Games played: 171
- Games started: 169
- Fumble recoveries: 4
- Stats at Pro Football Reference
- College Football Hall of Fame

Reginald McKenzie (born July 27, 1950) is an American former professional football player who was a left guard in the National Football League (NFL), primarily for the Buffalo Bills from 1972 to 1982. Selected as a first-team All-NFL player in 1973 and second team in 1974, McKenzie was a key player on the Bills' offensive line that became known as the Electric Company that led the way for O. J. Simpson to become the NFL's first 2,000-yard rusher during the 1973 NFL season.

McKenzie also played college football for the Michigan Wolverines from 1969 to 1971 and was a consensus All-American in 1971. He was inducted into the College Football Hall of Fame in 2002. McKenzie concluded his playing career with the Seattle Seahawks during the 1983 and 1984 NFL seasons. In his 13-year NFL career, McKenzie appeared in 171 games, all but two of those as a starter.

== Early life ==
McKenzie was born in Detroit, Michigan, in 1950. He attended Highland Park High School.

== University of Michigan ==
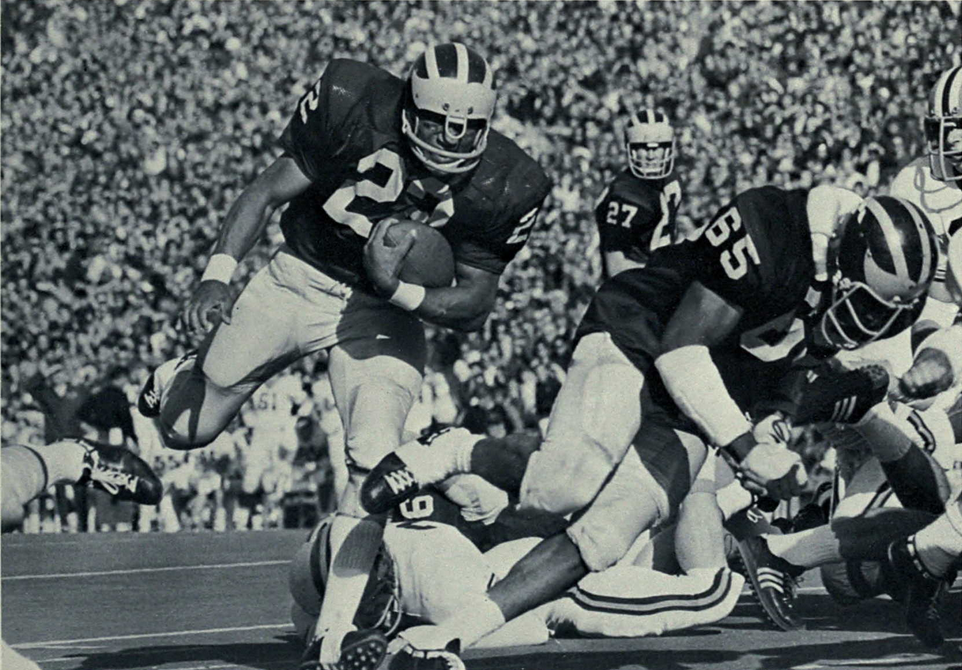
McKenzie (No. 65) playing for the Michigan Wolverines in 1971 with teammate Glenn Doughty (left)

McKenzie enrolled at the University of Michigan in 1968 and played college football at the offensive guard position for head coach Bo Schembechler's Michigan Wolverines football teams from 1969 to 1971. McKenzie was also initiated into Kappa Alpha Psi - Sigma chapter in 1970.

As a junior, McKenzie started all 10 games at left guard for the 1970 Michigan Wolverines football team that compiled a 9-1 record, scored 288 points, and generated 2,508 net rushing yards (251 yards per game). McKenie was selected by the conference coaches as a first-team player on the 1970 All-Big Ten Conference football team.

As a senior, he started all 12 games at left guard for the 1971 Michigan team that compiled an 11-1 record, scored 421 points, and broke Michigan's all-time record with 3,977 net rushing yards (331 rushing yards per game). McKenzie was a consensus first-team player on the 1971 College Football All-America Team.

== Professional football ==
McKenzie was selected by the Buffalo Bills in the second round (27th overall pick) of the 1972 NFL draft. He played 11 years for the Bills from 1972 to 1982. He was selected as a first-team All-NFL player in 1973 (Associated Press and Pro Football Writers) and 1974 (Pro Football Writers). He and Joe DeLamielleure were O. J. Simpson's pulling guards on his frequent sweep runs that made him the first 2,000-yard rusher during the 1973 NFL season. He was often referred to by Simpson as his "main man" and was the leader of the team's "Electric Company" which "turned on the Juice".

McKenzie also played for the Seattle Seahawks (1983–1984). In his 13-year NFL career, he appeared in 171 games, 169 as a starter.

== Later years and honors ==
After retiring from football, McKenzie established Reggie McKenzie Industrial Materials, an industrial products company based in Livonia, Michigan. He is also the founder of the Reggie McKenzie Foundation, an organization that helps Detroit youth with athletics and academics.

In 2002, McKenzie was inducted into the College Football Hall of Fame. He was also inducted into the Michigan Sports Hall of Fame in 1994.

He was inducted into the Greater Buffalo Sports Hall of Fame in 2016.

On November 22, 2016, McKenzie won the Big Ten's Ford-Kinnick Leadership Award.

McKenzie's nephew, Keith McKenzie was selected in the seventh round of the 1996 NFL draft by the Green Bay Packers. He played eight seasons in the NFL, winning Super Bowl XXXI with Green Bay.
