= Yards from scrimmage =

Gridiron football statistical measure

Yards from scrimmage is a gridiron football statistical measure. In the game of football, progress is measured by advancing the football towards the opposing team's goal line. Progress can be made during play by the offensive team by advancing the ball from the point of progress at the start of play known as the line of scrimmage. When the offensive team advances the ball by rushing the football, the player who carries the ball is given credit for the difference in progress measured in rushing yards. When the offensive team advances the ball by pass reception, the player who catches the reception is given credit for the difference in progress measured in reception yards. Although the ball may also be advanced by penalty these yards are not considered yards from scrimmage. Progress lost via quarterback sacks are classified variously by league of play with rules having changed over time within some leagues. The total of rushing yards and receiving yards is known as yards from scrimmage. This definition of yardage differs from total offense which gives credit for passing yardage to the person throwing the football rather than receiving the football.

This is an important statistic for running backs that contribute significantly to the passing attack. Many teams have special lineups for passing plays in which running backs who are better receivers are substituted into the game. Some running backs are notable for the fact that they are both a primary rushing and primary passing weapon. Notable running backs known for yards from scrimmage include Roger Craig, the first National Football League (NFL) player to have 1,000 yards rushing and receiving in the same season, Walter Payton, the NFL career record holder among running backs (until broken by Emmitt Smith), and Chris Johnson, the NFL single-season record holder. Thurman Thomas once led the NFL in yards from scrimmage in four consecutive years.

In the NFL, Chris Johnson, holds the single season record for yards from scrimmage with 2,509 yards in 2009. Jerry Rice holds the NFL's career record with 23,540 yards. Among active players, Derrick Henry leads the NFL in yards from scrimmage with 15,583 yards.

Yards from scrimmage differs from all-purpose yards, which include all forms of return yards such as yards on kickoff returns, punt returns, interception returns, and fumble recovery returns, in addition to yards from scrimmage.

== See also ==
- Glossary of American football
