= Joe DeLamielleure =

American football player (born 1951)

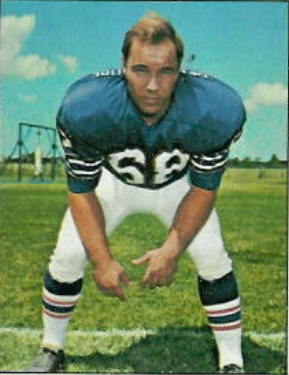

No. 68, 64
- Position: Guard

Personal information
- Born: March 16, 1951 (age 75); Detroit, Michigan, U.S.
- Listed height: 6 ft 3 in (1.91 m)
- Listed weight: 254 lb (115 kg)

Career information
- High school: St. Clement (Center Line, Michigan)
- College: Michigan State
- NFL draft: 1973: 1st round, 26th overall pick

Career history
- Buffalo Bills (1973–1979); Cleveland Browns (1980–1984); Buffalo Bills (1985); Charlotte Rage (1992)

Awards and highlights
- 3× First-team All-Pro (1974–1977); 4× Second-team All-Pro (1978–1980, 1983); 6× Pro Bowl (1975–1980); NFL 1970s All-Decade Team; Cleveland Browns Ring of Honor; Buffalo Bills Wall of Fame; Buffalo Bills 50th Anniversary Team; Second-team All-American (1972); 2× First-team All-Big Ten (1971, 1972); Second-team All-Big Ten (1970)

Career NFL statistics
- Games played: 185
- Games started: 178
- Fumble recoveries: 7
- Stats at Pro Football Reference

Career AFL statistics
- Tackles: 2
- Stats at ArenaFan.com
- Pro Football Hall of Fame

Joseph Michael DeLamielleure (/dɛlɑːmɛˈlɜːr/ deh-lah-meh-LUR; born March 16, 1951) is an American former professional football player who was a guard in the National Football League (NFL). He was an All-American playing college football for the Michigan State Spartans. He was selected by the Buffalo Bills in the first round of the 1973 NFL draft. He won All-Rookie Honors, after finding out a physical condition with his irregular heartbeat was not serious. In 1973 the Buffalo Bills rushing offense led the NFL in yards, yards per carry, as well as rushing touchdowns. He is also one of the first living NFL players to be tested and diagnosed with CTE (Chronic Traumatic Encephalopathy).

== Playing career ==
=== High school and college ===
Joe DeLamielleure attended St. Clement High School in Center Line, Michigan, where he developed into a standout offensive lineman. He went on to play college football at Michigan State University from 1969 to 1972. At Michigan State, he earned All-Big Ten Conference honors and was named a consensus All-American in 1972. He served as team captain during his senior season.

=== Buffalo Bills ===
DeLamielleure was selected in the first round (26th overall) of the 1973 NFL draft by the Buffalo Bills. He was perhaps the central figure in the "Electric Company," the Bills' offensive line that paved the way for O. J. Simpson to rush for 2,003 yards in 1973—the first player in NFL history to surpass the 2,000-yard mark, and the only player to do so in a 14-game season.

The Bills rushed for a league-leading 3,088 yards that season, a 14-game record. DeLamielleure also contributed on special teams, playing on the wedge of the kickoff return unit that blocked for Wallace Francis, who led the NFL with two kickoff return touchdowns.

In 1974, the Bills improved to 9–5 and made the playoffs, and DeLamielleure was named second-team All-Pro. In 1975, Buffalo fielded one of the most potent offenses of the decade, leading the NFL in multiple categories, including total offense, rushing, points, and touchdowns, while allowing the fewest sacks in the American Football Conference. DeLamielleure earned first-team All-Pro honors that season.

He was again named first-team All-Pro in 1976 as Simpson led the league in rushing. In 1977, despite Simpson’s midseason injury, the Bills led the NFL in passing yards and attempts. Following Simpson’s departure, running back Terry Miller ranked ninth in the league in rushing in 1978.

During his tenure with Buffalo, DeLamielleure was named to six Pro Bowls and earned six All-Pro selections. In 1975, he was named Offensive Lineman of the Year by the National Football League Players Association. He was also named Co-Offensive Lineman of the Year in 1973 by the 1,000 Yard Rusher Club of Columbus, Ohio, and received the Forrest Gregg Award as the NFL's top offensive lineman in 1977.

=== Cleveland Browns ===
In 1980, DeLamielleure was traded to the Cleveland Browns, where he blocked for quarterback Brian Sipe, the NFL's Most Valuable Player that season. He became the first player to block for both a 2,000-yard rusher and a 4,000-yard passer. The Browns' offensive line led the NFL in lowest sack percentage and helped produce a 1,000-yard rusher in Mike Pruitt. During his five seasons with Cleveland, DeLamielleure played in every game.

He was also named to the National Football League 1970s All-Decade Team.

=== Return to Buffalo and later career ===
DeLamielleure returned to the Bills for his final NFL season in 1985, concluding a distinguished 13-year professional career.

In 1992, he had a brief stint with the Charlotte Rage of the Arena Football League.

In recognition of his achievements, DeLamielleure was inducted into the Pro Football Hall of Fame in 2003. He was later inducted into the East–West Shrine Bowl Hall of Fame in 2007.

== After football ==
DeLamielleure was a key advocate for retired players of the league in need of financial assistance. As such, he was often a critic of Gene Upshaw, the head of the Players Union when it came to attending to the needs of older players in terms of medical and financial help in favor of current players. DeLamielleure, along with other former greats such as Mike Ditka announced the first Gridiron Greats Assistance Fund auction in 2007, and he stated that both Upshaw and former NFL commissioner Paul Tagliabue had "done nothing" when it comes to older players.

DeLamielleure was a promoter of the All-American Football League, a spring league that hoped to fill a void of the now-defunct NFL Europe. The AAFL planned to take collegiate players provided they've earned a four-year college degree. However, the league did not play a game.

In 2009, DeLamielleure and his two former college teammates at Michigan State University embarked on a bicycle ride from East Lansing, Michigan to the site of "The City of the Children" orphanage in Mexico. The bike tour was to raise funds needed to complete construction and provide the necessary resources to support the abandoned, abused and neglected children of that region.

In 2013, DeLamielleure was diagnosed with early signs of chronic traumatic encephalopathy (CTE).

In 2016, DeLamielleure appeared in the Academy Award-winning documentary O.J.: Made in America, discussing Simpson's time in Buffalo and his demeanor as a teammate.

== Coaching career ==
DeLamielleure served as an offensive line coach under Sam Rutigliano for two seasons at Liberty University, before going on to coach at Duke University in the same role from 1996 to 2000. He later coached in the Charlotte area with the Private Coaching Service CoachUp.

== Notes ==
- In 1969, DeLamielleure graduated from St. Clement High School in Center Line, MI. Joe is the only NFL football player ever from that school.
- In 1975, DeLamielleure was the NFLPA AFC Arm Wrestling Champion (he lost the final to Ed White).
- In 1978, DeLamielleure was the NFLPA NFL Racquetball Champion.
- In 1979, DeLamielleure was NFLPA AFC Racquetball champion (he lost the final to the NFC competitor Rafael Septién who was 5'9" and 160 pounds).
- In 1982, DeLamielleure competed in the NFL's Strongest Man Competition. The other contestants were Lyle Alzado, John Matuszak, Mike Webster, Steve Furness, Curt Marsh, and Bob Young. Only Marsh and DeLamielleure are still living and Marsh has had a leg amputated.
- In 2004, DeLamielleure was inducted into the Michigan Sports Hall of Fame.
