= 1973 NFL season =

American football season

Regular season
- Duration: September 16 – December 16, 1973

Playoffs
- Start date: December 22, 1973
- AFC Champions: Miami Dolphins
- NFC Champions: Minnesota Vikings

Super Bowl VIII
- Date: January 13, 1974
- Site: Rice Stadium, Houston, Texas
- Champions: Miami Dolphins

Pro Bowl
- Date: January 20, 1974
- Site: Arrowhead Stadium, Kansas City, Missouri

AFC teams: West, Central, East
NFC teams: West, Central, East

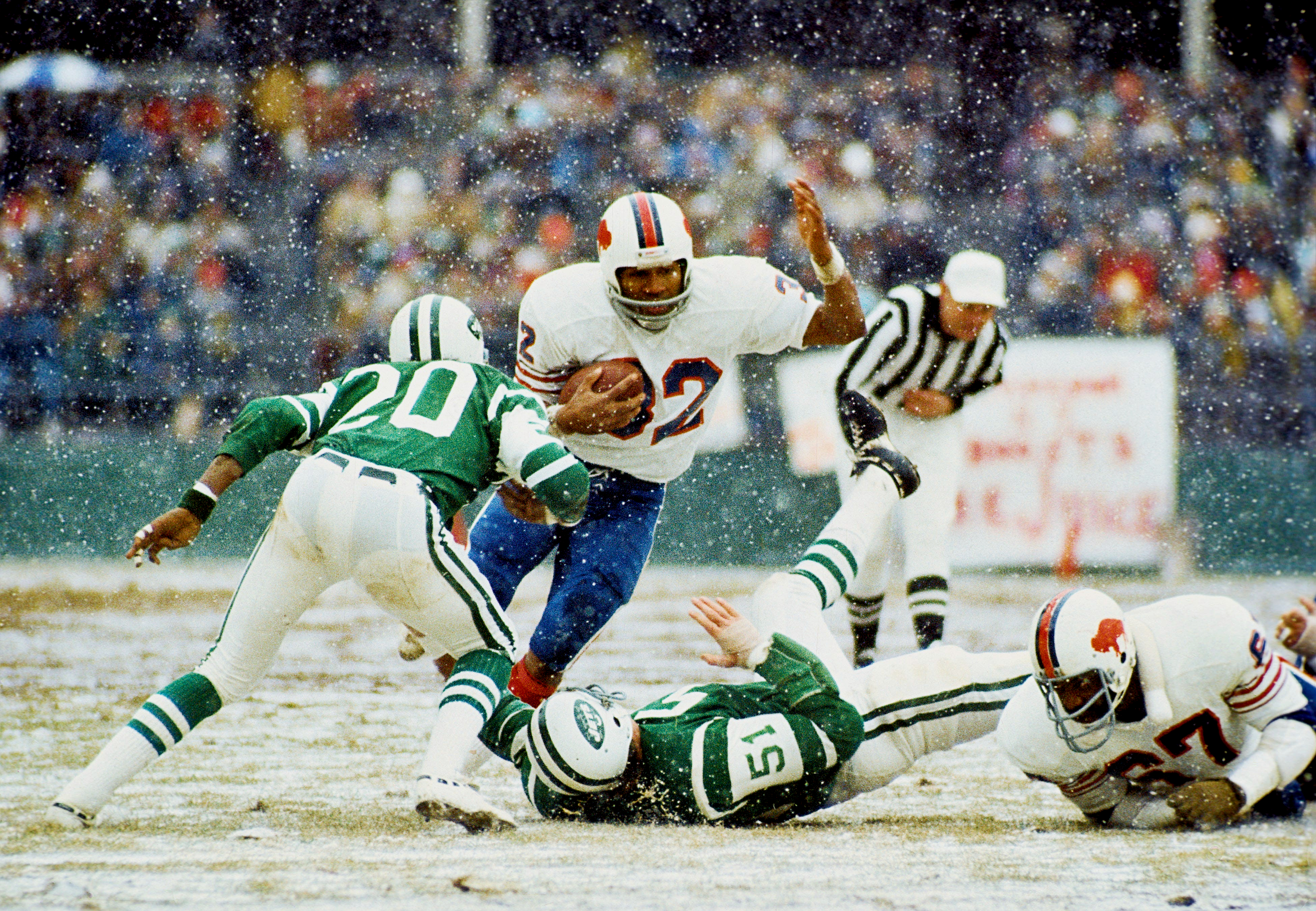
Simpson pictured in the game where he became the first running back to gain over 2,000 yards in a season on Dec. 16, 1973.

The 1973 NFL season was the 54th regular season of the National Football League. The season was highlighted by O. J. Simpson becoming the first player to rush for 2,000 yards in one season.

The season ended with Super Bowl VIII when the Miami Dolphins repeated as league champions by defeating the Minnesota Vikings 24–7 at Rice Stadium in Houston, Texas. The Pro Bowl took place on January 20, 1974, at Arrowhead Stadium in Kansas City, Missouri; the AFC beat the NFC 15–13.

== Draft ==
The 1973 NFL draft was held from January 30 to 31, 1973, at New York City's Americana Hotel. With the first pick, the Houston Oilers selected defensive end John Matuszak from the University of Tampa.

== Major rule changes ==
=== Jersey numbering system ===
- The league's jersey numbering system is adopted (players who played in 1972 are grandfathered):
  - 1–19: Quarterbacks and specialists
  - 20–49: Running backs, fullbacks and defensive backs
  - 50–59: Centers and linebackers
  - 60–79: Defensive linemen, guards, and offensive tackles
  - 80–89: Wide receivers and tight ends
  - Numbers 0, 00, and 90 to 99 are no longer allowed to be issued, even though these numbers were rarely issued anyway
    - Two players wearing 00 at the time, Jim Otto and Ken Burrough, were grandfathered.
    - The only players wearing 90s numbers in 1972 were Larry Brooks, John Bunting, George Webster and Wilbur Young.

The system would later be modified throughout the years to increase the available numbers to different positions due to increasing team rosters and teams retiring numbers.

=== Other new rules ===
- Defensive players cannot jump or stand on a teammate while trying to block a kick (leverage).
- The clock is to start at the snap following all changes of possession. Previously, the clock started on a change of possession when the ball was spotted ready for play by the referee, except if the ball went out of bounds on the change of possession, there was an incomplete pass on fourth down, the change of possession occurred on the final play of the first or third quarter, or either team took a timeout immediately; in those cases, the clock started on the snap.
- If there is a foul by the offensive team, and it is followed by a change of possession, the period can be extended by one play by the other team.
- If the receiving team commits a foul after the ball is kicked, possession will be presumed to have changed; the receiving team keeps the ball.

== Division races ==
Starting in 1970, and until 2002, there were three divisions (Eastern, Central and Western) in each conference. The winners of each division, and a fourth "wild card" team based on the best non-division winner, qualified for the playoffs. The tiebreaker rules were changed to start with head-to-head competition, followed by division records, records against common opponents, and records in conference play.

=== National Football Conference ===
Week	Eastern		Central		Western		Wild Card	
1	4 teams	1–0–0	2 teams	1–0–0	2 teams	1–0–0	5 teams	1–0–0
2	Dallas, St. Louis (tie)	2–0–0	Minnesota	2–0–0	Los Angeles	2–0–0	Dallas, St. Louis (tie)	2–0–0
3	Dallas	3–0–0	Minnesota	3–0–0	Los Angeles	3–0–0	St. Louis	2–1–0
4	Washington*	3–1–0	Minnesota	4–0–0	Los Angeles	4–0–0	Dallas	3–1–0
5	Washington	4–1–0	Minnesota	5–0–0	Los Angeles	5–0–0	Dallas	3–2–0
6	Washington	5–1–0	Minnesota	6–0–0	Los Angeles	6–0–0	Dallas	4–2–0
7	Washington	5–2–0	Minnesota	7–0–0	Los Angeles	6–1–0	Dallas*	4–3–0
8	Washington*	5–3–0	Minnesota	8–0–0	Los Angeles	6–2–0	Atlanta*	5–3–0
9	Washington*	6–3–0	Minnesota	9–0–0	Los Angeles	7–2–0	Atlanta*	6–3–0
10	Washington*	7–3–0	Minnesota	9–1–0	Los Angeles	8–2–0	Atlanta*	7–3–0
11	Washington	8–3–0	Minnesota	10–1–0	Los Angeles	9–2–0	Atlanta	8–3–0
12	Washington*	9–3–0	Minnesota	10–2–0	Los Angeles	10–2–0	Atlanta*	8–4–0
13	Dallas*	9–4–0	Minnesota	11–2–0	Los Angeles	11–2–0	Washington	9–4–0
14	Dallas	10–4–0	Minnesota	12–2–0	Los Angeles	12–2–0	Washington	10–4–0

- For the last time until 1997, the last two unbeaten teams in the league met in Week 7, with the Vikings tipping the Rams 10–9.

=== American Football Conference ===
Week	Eastern		Central		Western		Wild Card	
1	Buffalo, Miami (tie)	1–0–0	Cleveland, Pittsburgh (tie)	1–0–0	Denver	1–0–0	2 teams	1–0–0
2	NY Jets	1–1–0	Pittsburgh	2–0–0	4 teams	1–1–0	7 teams	1–1–0
3	Buffalo	2–1–0	Pittsburgh	3–0–0	Kansas City	2–1–0	3 teams	2–1–0
4	Buffalo, Miami (tie)	3–1–0	Pittsburgh	4–0–0	Kansas City	3–1–0	Buffalo, Miami (tie)	3–1–0
5	Buffalo, Miami (tie)	4–1–0	Pittsburgh	4–1–0	Kansas City	3–1–1	Buffalo, Miami (tie)	4–1–0
6	Miami	5–1–0	Pittsburgh	5–1–0	Kansas City	3–2–1	Cincinnati*	4–2–0
7	Miami	6–1–0	Pittsburgh	6–1–0	Oakland	4–2–1	Buffalo	5–2–0
8	Miami	7–1–0	Pittsburgh	7–1–0	Oakland	5–2–1	Buffalo	5–3–0
9	Miami	8–1–0	Pittsburgh	8–1–0	Oakland*	5–3–1	Kansas City*	5–3–1
10	Miami	9–1–0	Pittsburgh	8–2–0	Kansas City	6–3–1	Cleveland	6–3–1
11	Miami	10–1–0	Pittsburgh	8–3–0	Denver	6–3–2	Cleveland	7–3–1
12	Miami	11–1–0	Cincinnati*	8–4–0	Oakland	7–4–1	Pittsburgh	8–4–0
13	Miami	11–2–0	Cincinnati*	9–4–0	Oakland	8–3–1	Pittsburgh	9–4–0
14	Miami	12–2–0	Cincinnati*	10–4–0	Oakland	9–4–1	Pittsburgh	10–4–0

== Final standings ==
AFC East
	W	L	T	PCT	DIV	CONF	PF	PA	STK
Miami Dolphins	12	2	0	.857	7–1	9–2	343	150	W1
Buffalo Bills	9	5	0	.643	6–2	7–4	259	230	W4
New England Patriots	5	9	0	.357	1–7	3–8	258	300	L2
New York Jets	4	10	0	.286	4–4	4–7	240	306	L2
Baltimore Colts	4	10	0	.286	2–6	2–9	226	341	W2

AFC Central
	W	L	T	PCT	DIV	CONF	PF	PA	STK
Cincinnati Bengals	10	4	0	.714	4–2	8–3	286	231	W6
Pittsburgh Steelers	10	4	0	.714	4–2	7–4	347	210	W2
Cleveland Browns	7	5	2	.571	4–2	6–3–2	234	255	L2
Houston Oilers	1	13	0	.071	0–6	1–10	199	447	L6

AFC West
	W	L	T	PCT	DIV	CONF	PF	PA	STK
Oakland Raiders	9	4	1	.679	4–1–1	7–3–1	292	175	W4
Kansas City Chiefs	7	5	2	.571	4–2	6–4–1	231	192	W1
Denver Broncos	7	5	2	.571	3–2–1	7–2–1	354	296	L1
San Diego Chargers	2	11	1	.179	0–6	1–9–1	188	386	L4

NFC East
	W	L	T	PCT	DIV	CONF	PF	PA	STK
Dallas Cowboys	10	4	0	.714	6–2	8–3	382	203	W3
Washington Redskins	10	4	0	.714	6–2	8–3	325	198	W1
Philadelphia Eagles	5	8	1	.393	3–4–1	3–7–1	310	393	L1
St. Louis Cardinals	4	9	1	.321	3–5	4–7	286	365	L1
New York Giants	2	11	1	.179	1–6–1	1–9–1	226	362	L4

NFC Central
	W	L	T	PCT	DIV	CONF	PF	PA	STK
Minnesota Vikings	12	2	0	.857	6–0	10–1	296	168	W2
Detroit Lions	6	7	1	.464	3–2–1	6–4–1	271	247	L1
Green Bay Packers	5	7	2	.429	1–4–1	4–6–1	202	259	W1
Chicago Bears	3	11	0	.214	1–5	1–9	195	334	L6

NFC West
	W	L	T	PCT	DIV	CONF	PF	PA	STK
Los Angeles Rams	12	2	0	.857	5–1	9–2	388	178	W6
Atlanta Falcons	9	5	0	.643	4–2	7–4	318	224	W1
San Francisco 49ers	5	9	0	.357	2–4	4–7	262	319	L2
New Orleans Saints	5	9	0	.357	1–5	4–7	163	312	L1

=== Tiebreakers ===
- N.Y. Jets finished ahead of Baltimore in the AFC East based on head-to-head sweep (2–0).
- Cincinnati finished ahead of Pittsburgh in the AFC Central based on better conference record (8–3 to Steelers' 7–4).
- Kansas City finished ahead of Denver in the AFC West based on better division record (4–2 to Broncos' 3–2–1).
- Dallas finished ahead of Washington in the NFC East based on better point differential in head-to-head games (13 points).
- San Francisco finished ahead of New Orleans in the NFC West based on better division record (2–4 to Saints' 1–5).

== Playoffs ==
Note: Prior to the 1975 season, the home teams in the playoffs were decided based on a yearly rotation. Had the 1973 playoffs been seeded, the AFC divisional matchups would have been #3 Oakland at #2 Cincinnati and #4 wild card Pittsburgh at #1 Miami; the NFC matchups would not have changed, although #3 Dallas would have had to travel to #2 Los Angeles, and #1 Minnesota would have had home field for the NFC championship game.

Dec 22 – Metropolitan Stadium
WC	Washington	20
Dec 30 – Texas Stadium
Cent.	Minnesota	27
NFC
Cent.	Minnesota	27
Dec 23 – Texas Stadium
East	Dallas	10
NFC Championship
West	Los Angeles	16
Jan 13 – Rice Stadium
East	Dallas	27
Divisional round
NFC	Minnesota	7
Dec 22 – Oakland Coliseum
AFC	Miami	24
Super Bowl VIII
WC	Pittsburgh	14
Dec 30 – Miami Orange Bowl
West	Oakland	33
AFC
West	Oakland	10
Dec 23 – Miami Orange Bowl
East	Miami	27
AFC Championship
Cent.	Cincinnati	16
East	Miami	34

== Awards ==
Most Valuable Player	O. J. Simpson, running back, Buffalo
Coach of the Year	Chuck Knox, Los Angeles
Offensive Player of the Year	O. J. Simpson, running back, Buffalo
Defensive Player of the Year	Dick Anderson, safety, Miami
Offensive Rookie of the Year	Chuck Foreman, running back, Minnesota
Defensive Rookie of the Year	Wally Chambers, defensive tackle, Chicago
Man of the Year	Len Dawson, quarterback, Kansas City
Comeback Player of the Year	Roman Gabriel, quarterback, Eagles
Super Bowl Most Valuable Player	Larry Csonka, running back, Miami

== Coaching changes ==
=== Offseason ===
- Baltimore Colts: Howard Schnellenberger was hired as head coach. Don McCafferty was fired after going 1-4 to start the 1972 season. John Sandusky replaced McCafferty, getting the Colts to finish 1972 with a 5–9 record.
- Detroit Lions: Joe Schmidt resigned. Don McCafferty was named as Schmidt's replacement.
- Los Angeles Rams: Tommy Prothro was fired and replaced by Chuck Knox.
- New England Patriots: Chuck Fairbanks joined the team as both head coach and general manager. John Mazur resigned after going 2-7 to start the 1972 season, and Phil Bengtson then served as interim.
- New Orleans Saints: J. D. Roberts was fired midway through the 1973 preseason. John North served as head coach for the rest of the preseason and the 1973 regular season onward.
- Philadelphia Eagles: Ed Khayat was replaced by Mike McCormack.
- St. Louis Cardinals: Bob Hollway was fired and replaced by Don Coryell.

=== In-season ===
- Houston Oilers: Bill Peterson was fired after the Oilers lost their first five games. Sid Gillman finished out the rest of the season.
- San Diego Chargers: Harland Svare left the team after going 1–6–1. Ron Waller served for the last six games.

== Stadium changes ==
The Buffalo Bills moved from their original home at War Memorial Stadium and played their first season at Rich Stadium.

From October 7, the New York Giants moved from Yankee Stadium to the Yale Bowl in New Haven, Connecticut, where they would play the rest of 1973 and all of 1974. The Giants were forced out of Yankee Stadium after it closed to be renovated to a baseball-only venue. Also, a new Giants Stadium in East Rutherford, New Jersey was already under construction by 1973, but it would not open until 1976.

== Uniform changes ==
- The Buffalo Bills added blue pants to be worn with their white jerseys.
- The Chicago Bears changed their "C" helmet logo from white to orange with white trim. The Bears would use this new helmet logo until 2023.

- The Los Angeles Rams introduced new uniforms, reverting their white-and-blue helmets back to the gold-and-blue helmets last used in 1963. The new design included gold pants, blue jerseys with gold numbers and white jerseys with blue numbers. Both jerseys included curling rams horns on the sleeves: yellow horns on the blue jerseys and blue horns against yellow sleeves on the white jerseys, with the TV numbers on the sleeves enveloping on the ram horns.
- The Miami Dolphins added stripes to their aqua jerseys, while standardizing their white jerseys to include stripes. During their undefeated season, most Dolphins wore white jerseys with stripes, but some did not, including Bob Griese and Larry Csonka. Also, the Dolphins added orange-topped socks with aqua and white stripes.
- The New England Patriots added blue outlines to the numbers of both their red and white jerseys. Stripes were also added to the sleeve ends: blue and white for the red jerseys, and blue and red for the white jerseys.

== Television ==
This was the fourth and final year under the league's broadcast contracts with ABC, CBS, and NBC to televise Monday Night Football, the NFC package, and the AFC package, respectively. All three networks renewed their deals for another four years.

=== New television blackout rules ===
Through December 1972, all NFL home games (including championship games and Super Bowls) were blacked-out on television in each team's respective city. The first exception was Super Bowl VII in Los Angeles in January 1973; the league changed their policy to black out home games only if tickets had not sold out. This expanded the league's television presence in teams' home cities on gameday.

The policy was put into effect when, in 1972, the Washington Redskins made the playoffs for only the second time in 27 seasons. Because all home games were blacked-out, politicians — including devout football fan President Richard Nixon — were not able to watch their home team win. NFL commissioner Pete Rozelle refused to lift the blackout, despite a plea from Attorney General Richard Kleindienst, who then suggested that the U.S. Congress re-evaluate the NFL's antitrust exemption. Rozelle agreed to lift the blackout for Super Bowl VII on an "experimental basis", but Congress intervened before the 1973 season anyway, passing Public Law 93-107; it eliminated the blackout of games in the home market so long as the game was sold out by 72 hours before kickoff.

With the new rule, the NFL recorded over one million no-shows by ticketholders to regular season games in 1973. On March 23, 2015, the NFL's owners voted to suspend the blackout rules for 2015, meaning that all games would be televised in their home markets, regardless of ticket sales. The blackout rule has been suspended for every subsequent season through 2025.

=== Week 8 Bay Area controversy ===
The Congressional action caused an issue for CBS affiliate KPIX in the Bay Area. For Week 8 of the season, the Oakland Raiders were scheduled to host the New York Giants at Oakland Coliseum while the San Francisco 49ers would travel to Tiger Stadium to play the Detroit Lions. As each game involved an NFC road team, CBS held the rights to both games.

Since it was expected that the Raiders game would be blacked out in the Bay Area in any event, both games were scheduled for the 4:00 EST time slot, an uncontroversial arrangement at the time since it benefited both 49ers fans watching their game on television and Raiders fans attending their game in person. Following the enactment of Public Law 93-107 (and with concepts such as flexible scheduling decades away), KPIX had to decide which game to show once it became obvious the Oakland contest would sell out. Unwilling to sell the rights to either game to an independent station, KPIX (with the approval of CBS and the NFL) announced they would switch between both games, with an intent to screen the most consequential parts of each.

Technical limitations and production miscues led to the effort being widely panned by pundits and fans of both teams. Among other issues, KPIX failed to show the Raiders' opening touchdown while both sets of announcers were frequently cut off mid-sentence. Following the season, NFL schedule makers would ensure similar network conflicts in New York City and the Bay Area (and, later, Los Angeles after the Raiders moved there) were avoided. However, later improvements to technology and production standards would eventually allow the NFL to replicate KPIX's innovation on a national scale, culminating with the successful introduction of NFL Red Zone in 2009.
