= 1974 Cleveland Browns season =

NFL team season

- Owner: Art Modell
- General manager: Harold Sauerbrei
- Head coach: Nick Skorich
- Home stadium: Cleveland Municipal Stadium

Results
- Record: 4–10
- Division place: 4th AFC Central
- Playoffs: Did not qualify
- Pro Bowlers: RB Greg Pruitt; DT Jerry Sherk

The 1974 Cleveland Browns season was the team's 29th season, and 25th season with the National Football League.

The 1974 Browns were only the second Browns team to post a losing record in the 29-year history of the franchise to that point. (Note: The other was the 1956 team)

== Season summary ==
The Browns finished 4–10. All the players who had led the Browns success through the 1960s and the early part of the 1970s either had retired or were ready to do so. Since the Browns had been picking at the tail end of the draft for so long, they had little in the way of reinforcements to step into those stars' shoes.

With the exception of the Denver Broncos, who had a modest 7–6–1 record, none of the teams the Browns defeated in 1974 finished above .500. The Browns topped the Broncos 23–21 by scoring two unanswered touchdowns at the end of the game behind a backup third year quarterback by the name of Brian Sipe, out of San Diego State, who the Browns drafted in the thirteenth round of the 1972 draft, and had been on the team's taxi squad during his first two seasons with the team. That would be Cleveland's last win vs. Denver until 1990.

They beat the 7–7 Houston Oilers 20–7, the 7–7 New England Patriots 21–14 and the 6–8 San Francisco 49ers 7–0 in a tundra-like setting after one of the worst snowstorms in Northeast Ohio history.

Otherwise, it was not good. The Browns offense could not score enough points behind the direction of quarterback Mike Phipps, taken with the No. 3 overall pick in the 1970 NFL Draft that was acquired when the club dealt HOF wide receiver Paul Warfield to the Miami Dolphins. And the defense had trouble stopping people. The Browns got off to a 1–5 start, getting humbled 33–7 by the Cincinnati Bengals in—by far—the most one-sided opening-day loss in franchise history to that point—and losing by 22 points (29–7) to the St. Louis Cardinals and by 16 (40–24) to the Oakland Raiders. They also were destroyed by 24 (41–17) by the Dallas Cowboys in the next-to-last game of the season.

Players remaining from previous Cleveland Browns teams played in several close games, regardless of the team's roster composition.

They gave the eventual Super Bowl champion Steelers all they could handle in both meetings, losing 20–16 and 26–16, lost by 10 points (34–24) in the rematch with the Bengals, fell by five (15–10) to the 9–5 Buffalo Bills, lost 36–35 to the San Diego Chargers when Sipe fumbled the snap as the club was positioning the ball in the middle of the field for Don Cockroft to kick a game-winning field goal on the final play, and were beaten by four (28–24) in the rematch with the Oilers in the season finale.

On the season as a whole, the Browns started games well and ended them well, being outscored just 62–61 in the first quarter and outscoring their foes 73–63 in the fourth. But in the middle two quarters combined, they were out-done by a whopping 219–117 count, and therein lies most of the reason why they gave up 344 points, the most in team history to that time.

== Offseason ==
=== NFL draft ===
The following were selected in the 1974 NFL draft.

1974 Cleveland Browns draft
Round	Selection	Player	Position	College	Notes
2	40	Billy Corbett	Offensive tackle	Johnson C. Smith	
5	118	Mark Ilgenfritz	Defensive end	Vanderbilt	
6	146	Billy Pritchett	Running back	West Texas A&M	
7	163	Bob Herrick	Wide receiver	Purdue	
7	171	Gerry Sullivan	Offensive tackle	Illinois	
8	199	Eddie Brown	Defensive back	Tennessee	
9	224	Dan Scott	Guard	Ohio State	
10	238	Mike Puestow	Wide receiver	North Dakota State	
11	274	Tom Gooden	Kicker	Harding	
12	302	Ron McNeil	Defensive end	North Carolina Central	
13	327	Mike Seifert	Defensive end	Wisconsin	
14	352	Bob Hunt	Running back	Heidelberg	
15	380	Ransom Terrell	Linebacker	Arizona	
16	407	Preston Anderson	Defensive back	Rice	
17	430	Carlton Buchanan	Defensive tackle	SW Oklahoma	

== Personnel ==
=== Staff / Coaches ===
1974 Cleveland Browns staff
Front office: Owner and president – Art Modell; Executive vice president/general manager – Harold Sauerbrei; Vice President of Player Personnel - Bob Nussbaumer; Head coaches: Head coaches – Nick Skorich; Offensive coaches: Wide receivers – Fran Polsfoot; Offensive line – Forrest Gregg	Defensive coaches: Defensive Coordinator / Defensive Line - Dick Modzelewski; Linebackers – Dale Lindsey; Secondary / defensive backs – Richie McCabe; Special teams coaches: Special teams – Al Tabor; Film Coordinator - Ed Ulinski; Athletic Trainer - Leo Murphy

=== Roster ===
1974 Cleveland Browns roster
Quarterbacks: 15 Mike Phipps; 16 Will Cureton; 17 Brian Sipe; Running backs: 26 Billy Lefear; 30 Ken Brown; 34 Greg Pruitt; 35 Bo Scott; 37 Hugh McKinnis; 39 Billy Pritchett (IR); Wide receivers: 42 Gloster Richardson; 43 Fair Hooker; 48 Dave Sullivan; 82 Tim George; 83 Jubilee Dunbar (IR); 88 Steve Holden; Tight ends: 84 Jim Thaxton; 85 Ken Smith (IR); 89 Milt Morin	Offensive linemen: 54 Tom DeLeone C; 61 Bob DeMarco C; 62 Glen Holloway G; 63 Barry Darrow T; 65 John Demarie G; 67 Chuck Hutchison G; 69 Pete Adams G; 73 Doug Dieken T; 78 Bob McKay T/G; 79 Gerry Sullivan T; 94 Bob McClowry C (IR); Defensive linemen: 66 Mike Seifert DE; 71 Walter Johnson DT; 72 Jerry Sherk DT; 74 Carl Barisich DE/DT; 75 Allen Aldridge DE; 77 Mark Ilgenfritz DE; 81 Nick Roman DE	Linebackers: 50 John Garlington OLB; 52 Billy Andrews OLB; 53 Mel Long MLB; 56 Jim Romaniszyn OLB; 59 Charlie Hall OLB; 60 Bob Babich MLB; Defensive backs: 21 Van Green CB/SS; 22 Clarence Scott CB; 23 Clifford Brooks CB; 27 Thom Darden FS; 28 Eddie Brown SS; 29 Walt Sumner SS; 40 Preston Anderson FS; Special teams: 10 Chris Gartner K; 12 Don Cockroft K/P; rookies in italics

== Exhibition schedule ==
Week	Date	Opponent	Result	Record	Venue	Attendance
1	August 2	at Los Angeles Rams	L 21–24	0–1	Los Angeles Memorial Coliseum	28,021
2	August 12	San Francisco 49ers	W 21–20	1–1	Cleveland Municipal Stadium	24,008
3	August 17	vs. Baltimore Colts	L 3–37	1–2	Tampa Stadium	25,116
4	August 24	Washington Redskins	L 17–20	1–3	Cleveland Municipal Stadium	44,528
5	September 1	vs. Cincinnati Bengals	W 21–17	2–3	Ohio Stadium	36,326
6	September 7	at Detroit Lions	L 7–21	2–4	Tiger Stadium	42,905

== Regular season ==
=== Schedule ===
Week	Date	Opponent	Result	Record	Venue	Attendance	Game Recap
1	September 15	at **Cincinnati Bengals**	**L** 7–33	0–1	Riverfront Stadium	53,113	Recap
2	September 22	**Houston Oilers**	**W** 20–7	1–1	Cleveland Municipal Stadium	58,988	Recap
3	September 29	at St. Louis Cardinals	**L** 7–29	1–2	Busch Memorial Stadium	43,472	Recap
4	October 6	Oakland Raiders	**L** 24–40	1–3	Cleveland Municipal Stadium	65,247	Recap
5	October 13	**Cincinnati Bengals**	**L** 24–34	1–4	Cleveland Municipal Stadium	70,897	Recap
6	October 20	at **Pittsburgh Steelers**	**L** 16–20	1–5	Three Rivers Stadium	48,100	Recap
7	October 27	Denver Broncos	**W** 23–21	2–5	Cleveland Municipal Stadium	60,478	Recap
8	November 3	at San Diego Chargers	**L** 35–36	2–6	San Diego Stadium	36,631	Recap
9	November 10	at New England Patriots	**W** 21–14	3–6	Schaefer Stadium	61,279	Recap
10	November 17	**Pittsburgh Steelers**	**L** 16–26	3–7	Cleveland Municipal Stadium	77,739	Recap
11	November 24	Buffalo Bills	**L** 10–15	3–8	Cleveland Municipal Stadium	66,504	Recap
12	December 1	San Francisco 49ers	**W** 7–0	4–8	Cleveland Municipal Stadium	24,559	Recap
13	December 7	at Dallas Cowboys	**L** 17–41	4–9	Texas Stadium	48,754	Recap
14	December 15	at **Houston Oilers**	**L** 24–28	4–10	Astrodome	37,910	Recap
Note: Intra-division opponents are in **bold** text.

=== Standings ===
AFC Central
	W	L	T	PCT	DIV	CONF	PF	PA	STK
Pittsburgh Steelers	10	3	1	.750	4–2	7–3–1	305	189	W2
Houston Oilers	7	7	0	.500	4–2	7–4	236	282	W1
Cincinnati Bengals	7	7	0	.500	3–3	5–6	283	259	L3
Cleveland Browns	4	10	0	.286	1–5	3–8	251	344	L2
