= 1977 Buffalo Bills season =

18th season in franchise history; final one with O. J. Simpson

- Owner: Ralph Wilson
- Head coach: Jim Ringo
- Home stadium: Rich Stadium

Results
- Record: 3–11
- Division place: 4th AFC East
- Playoffs: Did not qualify
- Pro Bowlers: G Joe DeLamielleure

The 1977 Buffalo Bills season was the franchise's 18th season, and their eighth in the National Football League. Improving on their 2–12 record from 1976 by only one game, the Bills failed to qualify for the playoffs for the third consecutive season, and went 3–11 for their second consecutive losing season. Buffalo started the season with four consecutive losses, and failed to win consecutive games. The team was shut out two times at home. The Bills beat only one team with a winning record — the New England Patriots in an early November game in Foxboro that ultimately proved fatal to the Patriots' playoff hopes.

After drawing 76,000 to Rich Stadium on opening day against the Dolphins, Buffalo drew an average of only 35,000 for the remaining six home games.

The Bills had one of the most pass-heavy offenses in the NFL in 1977. Quarterback Joe Ferguson led the league in pass attempts (457, 32.6 per game) and passing yards (2,803, 200.2 per game). He also threw 24 interceptions, the most in the NFL.

Although the Bills passed the ball more often than any other team, they were not efficient through the air: they ranked 19th out of 28 teams in passing touchdowns, 21st in yards per attempt, and 20th in quarterback rating (a dismal 54.7). Buffalo's 160 points scored was the third-worst in the NFL.

Buffalo’s defense also gave up 313 points, the fourth-worst total in the league. Buffalo's anemic scoring and porous defense gave the team a point-differential of −153, worst in the league. This was the last season for O.J. Simpson as a member of the Bills, as he was traded to the 49ers the following season. Simpson would ultimately finish his last season with the Bills with 557 rushing yards on 126 attempts for a 4.4 rushing average.

== Offseason ==
=== NFL draft ===
Seventh round pick Mike Nelms was cut by the Bills in the 1977 training camp, and went to play in the Canadian Football League for the next three seasons. He returned to the NFL in 1980, joining the Washington Redskins, and was voted to three consecutive NFC Pro Bowl squads from 1980–1982.

Cornerback Charles Romes played in every game for the Bills from 1977 until his final season with Buffalo in 1986. He finished his career in Buffalo with 28 interceptions, fourth in Bills’ history.

1977 Buffalo Bills draft
Round	Pick	Player	Position	College	Notes
1	12	Phil Dokes	Defensive tackle	Oklahoma State	from Detroit
3	59	Curtis Brown	Running back	Missouri	
3	73	John Kimbrough	Wide receiver	St. Cloud State	
4	86	Jimmy Dean	Defensive tackle	Texas A&M	
5	115	Fred Besana	Quarterback	California	
5	127	Neil O'Donoghue	Kicker	Auburn	
6	157	Ron Pruitt	Defensive end	Nebraska	
7	170	Mike Nelms *	Defensive back	Baylor	
8	197	Greg Morton	Defensive tackle	Michigan	
11	282	Nate Jackson	Running back	Tennessee State	
12	309	Charles Romes	Cornerback	North Carolina Central	
Made roster

== Personnel ==
=== Staff/coaches ===
1977 Buffalo Bills staff
Front office
- Majority owner/team president – Ralph Wilson
- Vice-president & general manager – Bob Lustig
- Vice president/minority owner – Pat McGroder

Coaching staff

- Head coach – Jim Ringo

Offensive coaches

- Running backs coach – Jim LaRaue
- Wide Receivers Coach - Kay Dalton
- Offensive line coaches – Ray Wietecha

Defensive/Special teams coaches

- Defensive Coordinator / Defensive Backs Coach - Richie McCabe
- Defensive line – Jerry Wampfler
- Linebackers – Jim Carr

Scouting

- Director of Scouting - Marvin Bass

=== Roster ===
1977 Buffalo Bills roster
Quarterbacks (QB): 11 Fred Besana; 12 Joe Ferguson; 14 Ken Johnson; Running backs (RB): 34 Jim Braxton; 35 Mike Collier; 36 Mike Franckowiak; 25 Roland Hooks; 38 Stan Winfrey; Wide receivers (WR): 81 Bob Chandler; 82 John Kimbrough; 89 Lou Piccone; 86 Leonard Willis; Tight ends (TE): 88 Reuben Gant; 87 Paul Seymour	Offensive linemen (OL): 60 Bill Adams G; 68 Joe DeLamielleure G; 70 Joe Devlin T; 78 Dave Foley T; 73 Ken Jones T; 67 Reggie McKenzie G; 61 Willie Parker C; 53 Connie Zelencik C; Defensive linemen (DL): 85 Phil Dokes DE/DT; 76 Bill Dunstan DT; 71 Mike Kadish DT; 72 John Little DT; 79 Greg Morton DE; 83 Sherman White DE; 77 Ben Williams DE	Linebackers (LB): 50 Greg Collins MLB; 30 Bo Cornell OLB; 52 Merv Krakau MLB; 51 Dan Jilek OLB; 56 Bob Nelson MLB; 59 Shane Nelson OLB; 54 Tom Ruud OLB; Defensive backs (DB): 29 Mario Clark CB; 22 Steve Freeman FS; 43 Tony Greene FS; 28 Dwight Harrison CB; 24 Doug Jones SS; 46 Keith Moody CB; 26 Charles Romes CB; Special teams (ST): 7 Marv Bateman P; 5 Carson Long K	Reserve: 47 Curtis Brown RB (IR); 86 Reggie Craig WR (IR); 80 John Holland WR (IR); 32 O. J. Simpson RB (IR); 55 John Skorupan LB (IR); Rookies in italics 45 active, 5 reserve, 0 practice squad

== Schedule ==
Week	Date	Opponent	Result	Record	Venue	Attendance
1	September 18	**Miami Dolphins**	**L** 0–13	0–1	Rich Stadium	76,097
2	September 25	at Denver Broncos	**L** 6–26	0–2	Mile High Stadium	74,897
3	October 2	at **Baltimore Colts**	**L** 14–17	0–3	Memorial Stadium	49,247
4	October 9	**New York Jets**	**L** 19–24	0–4	Rich Stadium	32,046
5	October 16	Atlanta Falcons	**W** 3–0	1–4	Rich Stadium	27,348
6	October 23	Cleveland Browns	**L** 16–27	1–5	Rich Stadium	60,905
7	October 30	at Seattle Seahawks	**L** 17–56	1–6	Kingdome	61,180
8	November 6	at **New England Patriots**	**W** 24–14	2–6	Schaefer Stadium	60,263
9	November 13	**Baltimore Colts**	**L** 13–31	2–7	Rich Stadium	39,444
10	November 20	**New England Patriots**	**L** 7–20	2–8	Rich Stadium	27,598
11	November 28	at Oakland Raiders	**L** 13–34	2–9	Oakland–Alameda County Coliseum	51,558
12	December 4	Washington Redskins	**L** 0–10	2–10	Rich Stadium	22,975
13	December 11	at **New York Jets**	**W** 14–10	3–10	Shea Stadium	31,929
14	December 17	at **Miami Dolphins**	**L** 14–31	3–11	Miami Orange Bowl	39,626
Note: Intra-division opponents are in **bold** text.

=== Season summary ===
==== Week 5 ====
Team	1	2	3	4	Total
Falcons	0	0	0	0	0
• Bills	0	3	0	0	3

- Date: October 16
- Location: Rich Stadium, Orchard Park, New York
- Game start: 1:00 p.m. EST
- Game attendance: 27,348
- Game weather: 45 °F (7.2 °C), wind 17 miles per hour (27 km/h; 15 kn)
- Referee: Bernie Ulman
- TV announcers (NFL on CBS): Don Criqui, Nick Buoniconti

Scoring summary
2	BUF	Neil O'Donoghue 30 yard field goal	Bills 3–0

==== Week 11 ====
Team	1	2	3	4	Total
Bills	3	7	3	0	13
• Raiders	13	7	14	0	34

- Date: November 28
- Location: Oakland Alameda Coliseum, Oakland, California
- Game start: 9:00 p.m. EST
- Game weather: 56 °F (13.3 °C), wind 6 miles per hour (9.7 km/h; 5.2 kn)
- TV announcers (ABC Monday Night Football): Howard Cosell, Frank Gifford, Don Meredith

==== Week 12 ====
Team	1	2	3	4	Total
• Redskins	0	7	0	3	10
Bills	0	0	0	0	0

- Date: December 7
- Location: Rich Stadium, Orchard Park, New York
- Game start: 1:00 p.m. EST
- Game attendance: 22,975
- Game weather: 29 °F (−1.7 °C), wind 15 miles per hour (24 km/h; 13 kn)
- Referee: Ben Dreith
- TV announcers (NFL on CBS): Don Criqui, Nick Buoniconti

==== Week 13 ====
Team	1	2	3	4	Total
• **Bills**	0	7	0	7	14
Jets	0	3	0	7	10

- Date: December 11
- Location: Shea Stadium, Flushing, New York
- Game start: 1:00 p.m. EST
- Game attendance: 31,929
- Game weather: 20 °F (−6.7 °C), wind 17 miles per hour (27 km/h; 15 kn)
- TV announcers (NBC): Marv Albert,Len Dawson
- Source: Pro-Football-Reference.com

Scoring summary
2	Jets	Pat Leahy 25 yard field goal	Jets 3–0
1	Bills	Bob Chandler 5 yard pass from Joe Ferguson (Carson Long kick)	Bills 7–3
4	Jets	Wesley Walker 9 yard pass from Richard Todd (Pat Leahy kick)	Jets 10–7
4	Bills	Bob Chandler 11 yard pass from Joe Ferguson (Carson Long kick)	Bills 14–10

=== Standings ===
AFC East
	W	L	T	PCT	DIV	CONF	PF	PA	STK
^{(2)} Baltimore Colts	10	4	0	.714	6–2	9–3	295	221	W1
Miami Dolphins	10	4	0	.714	6–2	8–4	313	197	W1
New England Patriots	9	5	0	.643	4–4	7–5	278	217	L1
New York Jets	3	11	0	.214	2–6	2–10	191	300	L2
Buffalo Bills	3	11	0	.214	2–6	2–10	160	313	L1

== Awards and honors ==
=== All-Pros ===
- Joe DeLamielleure, Guard

== Video Archives ==
- 1977 NFL Week 12: Redskins at Bills at YouTube
- 1977 NFL Week 13: Bills at Jets at YouTube
