= Ernie Jackson =

American football player (born 1950)

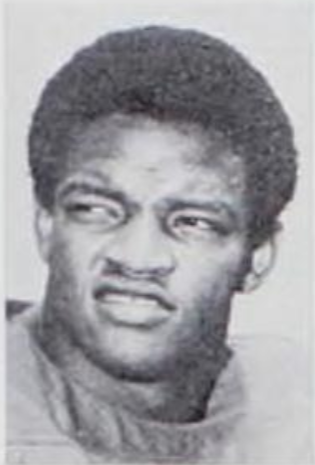
- Jackson, c. 1970

No. 30, 44
- Position: Cornerback

Personal information
- Born: April 11, 1950 (age 76); Hopkins, South Carolina, U.S.
- Listed height: 5 ft 10 in (1.78 m)
- Listed weight: 173 lb (78 kg)

Career information
- High school: Lower Richland (Hopkins)
- College: Duke
- NFL draft: 1972: 7th round, 164th overall pick

Career history
- New Orleans Saints (1972–1977); Atlanta Falcons (1978); Detroit Lions (1979)

Awards and highlights
- Consensus All-American (1971); ACC Player of the Year (1971); First-team All-ACC (1971)

Career NFL statistics
- Interceptions: 15
- Fumble recoveries: 8
- Defensive TDs: 1
- Stats at Pro Football Reference

Earnest Jackson (born April 11, 1950) is an American former professional football player who was a cornerback for eight seasons in the National Football League (NFL) for the New Orleans Saints, Atlanta Falcons, and the Detroit Lions. He played college football for the Duke Blue Devils.
