= 1972 All-Atlantic Coast Conference football team =

American college football all-star team

The 1972 All-Atlantic Coast Conference football team consists of American football players chosen by various selectors for their All-Atlantic Coast Conference ("ACC") teams for the 1972 NCAA University Division football season. Selectors in 1972 included the United Press International (UPI).

== All-Atlantic Coast Conference selections ==
=== Offensive selections ===
==== Ends ====
- Dave Sullivan, Virginia (UPI)
- Pat Kenney, NC State (UPI)

==== Offensive tackles ====
- Rick Druschel, NC State (UPI)
- Jerry Sain, North Carolina (UPI)

==== Offensive guards ====
- Ron Rusnak, North Carolina (UPI)
- Bill Yoest, NC State (UPI)

==== Centers ====
- Dale Grimes, Duke (UPI)

==== Quarterbacks ====
- Bruce Shaw, NC State (UPI)

==== Backs ====
- Steve Jones, Duke (UPI)
- Stan Fritts, NC State (UPI)
- Willie Burden, NC State (UPI)

=== Defensive selections ===
==== Defensive ends ====
- Gene Brown, North Carolina (UPI)
- Melvin Parker, Duke (UPI)

==== Defensive tackles ====
- Ed Newman, Duke (UPI)
- Eric Hyman, North Carolina (UPI)

==== Linebackers ====
- Mike Mansfield, North Carolina (UPI)
- Paul Vellano, Maryland (UPI)
- Jimmy DeRatt, North Carolina (UPI)
- Nick Arcaro, Wake Forest (UPI)

==== Defensive backs ====
- Bill Hanenberg, Duke (UPI)
- Lou Angelo, North Carolina (UPI)
- Mike Stultz, NC State (UPI)
- Bob Smith, Maryland (UPI)

=== Special teams ===
==== Kickers ====
- Chuck Ramsey, Wake Forest (UPI)

== Key ==
UPI = United Press International

== See also ==
- 1972 College Football All-America Team
