= Greg Pruitt =

American football player (born 1951)

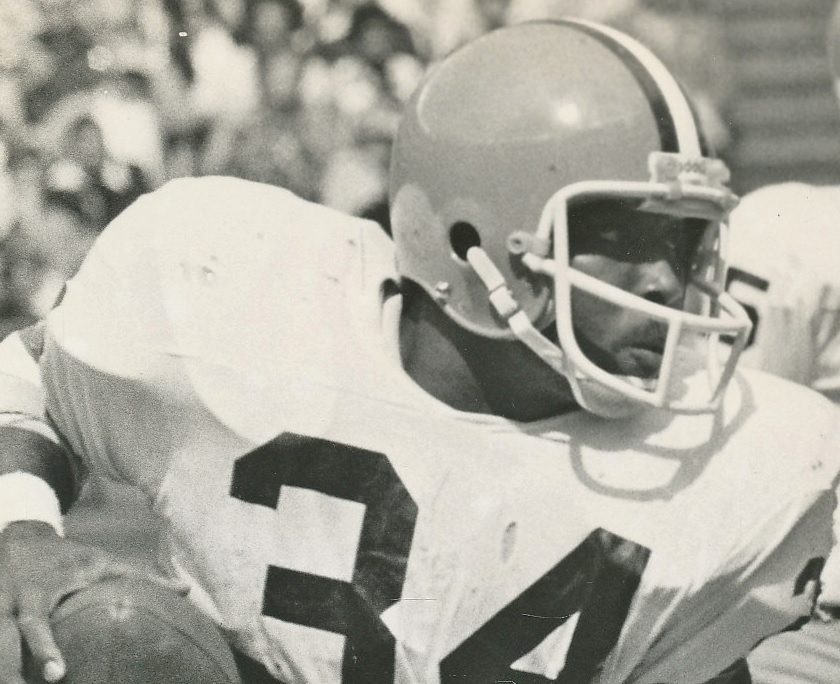
- Pruitt with the Cleveland Browns in 1975

No. 34
- Position: Running back

Personal information
- Born: August 18, 1951 (age 75); Houston, Texas, U.S.
- Listed height: 5 ft 10 in (1.78 m)
- Listed weight: 190 lb (86 kg)

Career information
- High school: B.C. Elmore (TX)
- College: Oklahoma (1970–1972)
- NFL draft: 1973: 2nd round, 30th overall pick

Career history
- Cleveland Browns (1973–1981); Los Angeles Raiders (1982–1984)

Awards and highlights
- Super Bowl champion (XVIII); 5× Pro Bowl (1973, 1974, 1976, 1977, 1983); Cleveland Browns Legends; 2× Unanimous All-American (1971, 1972); Big Eight Player of the Year (1971); 2× First-team All-Big Eight (1971, 1972)

Career NFL statistics
- Rushing yards: 5,672
- Rushing average: 4.7
- Rushing touchdowns: 27
- Stats at Pro Football Reference
- College Football Hall of Fame

Gregory Donald Pruitt (born August 18, 1951) is an American former professional football player who was a running back in the National Football League (NFL) from 1973 through 1984. He played college football for the Oklahoma Sooners. Pruitt was selected to five Pro Bowls, four as a member of the Cleveland Browns and one as a member of the Los Angeles Raiders, three times as a kick returner/return specialist and twice as a running back. He was also part of the Raiders' Super Bowl XVIII winning team, beating the Washington Redskins. He was in the first Cleveland Browns Legends class in 2001.

Pruitt was inducted into the College Football Hall of Fame in 1999. He was a unanimous All-America selection two consecutive seasons at Oklahoma (1971 and 1972), and was the Big Eight's offensive player of the year in 1971. He finished in the top three in Heisman Trophy voting twice. He was on two Oklahoma teams that won the Sugar Bowl, and finished the season ranked No. 2 in the nation.

== Early life ==
Pruitt was born on August 8, 1951, in Houston. He attended B. C. Elmore High School in Houston. As a freshman at B. C. Elmore, he was 4 ft 4 in (1.32 m). He weighed only 165 lb (74.8 kg) as a senior. He was on the football team at B. C. Elmore, playing quarterback, running back, and wide receiver on offense; and defensive back on defense. As a senior, he had 87 receptions for 26 touchdowns; and averaged 12 yards per carry when running the ball. Pruitt was coached by Wendell Mosley in high school, who would later become Pruitt's running backs coach at the University of Oklahoma, beginning in Pruitt's senior year there (1972).

== College career ==
At the time Pruitt graduated high school, he was highly recruited by numerous historically black colleges and universities (HBCU), but only four or five other schools offered him scholarships: the University of Oklahoma, University of Houston, University of Colorado, Arizona State University and/or the University of Kansas. Oklahoma Sooners offensive line coach Bill Michael liked to recruit players from B.C. Elmore High School, where he recruited Pruitt. Two of Pruitt's former high school teammates were already attending Oklahoma (Albert Qualls and Lionel Day), and coach Mosley had a longstanding friendship with Michael and Oklahoma head coach Chuck Fairbanks. Moseley believed these were the principal reasons Pruitt chose to attend Oklahoma.

Pruitt played varsity football for the Sooners from 1970 to 1972, in the Big Eight Conference. He was a unanimous All-American selection in 1971 and 1972, and was also named first-team All-Big Eight in 1971 and 1972. The Associated Press (AP) selected Pruitt as the Big Eight's offensive player of the year for 1971. He was academic All-Big Eight in 1972. Pruitt ranks third among Sooners in career all-purpose yards. Pruitt gained 3,122 rushing yards, 491 receiving yards, 139 yards on punt returns and 679 yards returning kickoffs. In total, he scored 41 career touchdowns as a Sooner. He came in second in Heisman Trophy voting in 1972, and third in 1971.

=== Sophomore (1970) ===
As a sophomore (1970), Pruit rushed for 241 yards and five touchdowns, averaging 5.4 yards per carry, in the regular season. He also had 19 receptions for 240 yards and two receiving touchdowns. He had been recruited to Oklahoma as a pass receiver, but was moved to running back in his sophomore year when head coach Chuck Fairbanks implemented the wishbone offense. Pruitt did not originally like the switch from flanker to running back, but did like the fact he would be involved in more plays as a running back. After establishing himself as a running back in 1970, Sooner's backfield coach Barry Switzer observed the following season that Pruitt was not only the team's best receiving running back, but also their best blocking running back.

Oklahoma and Alabama played to a 24–24 tie in the 1970 Astro-Bluebonnet Bowl. In the game's second quarter, Pruitt had touchdown runs of 58 and 25 yards, and totaled 101 yards in the game on only eight carries. Pruitt received the game's Most Valuable Player award for a back, in a game where the Sooners ran for a total of 349 yards and Alabama's Johnny Musso rushed for 138 yards on 27 carries. Alabama coach Bear Bryant said after the game that the two main problems for his team in not winning the game were Oklahoma's blocking and Pruitt's running.

=== Junior (1971) ===
As a junior (1971), Pruitt led the Big Eight in rushing with 1,665 yards (on 178 carries) in the regular season, tied for the Big Eight lead with 17 rushing touchdowns (with teammate Jack Mildren), and led all college football players with a 9.4 yards per carry rushing average. He was fourth nationally in total rushing yards, with the three players ahead of him having considerably more rushing attempts than Pruitt in achieving their yardage (Ed Marinaro, 356; Robert Newhouse, 277; Terry Metcalf, 267).

From October 2 to 23, 1971, Pruitt rushed for at least 190 yards in four consecutive games. On October 2, he gained 205 yards against the No. 17 ranked University of Southern California. On October 9, against the No. 3 ranked Texas Longhorns, Pruitt rushed for 216 yards on 20 carries, and scored three touchdowns in leading Oklahoma to a 48–27 victory. The next week (October 16) he rushed for 190 yards against No. 6 ranked Colorado. His biggest rushing game came one week later (October 23) against Kansas State, when he rushed for 294 yards on 19 carries, setting a Big Eight record at the time (broken on November 14 by Charlie Davis's 342 yards for Colorado); with three rushing touchdowns. He ran for 159 yards the following week (October 30) against Iowa State. Pruitt was named National Back of the Week for two consecutive weeks, against Southern California and Texas.

On November 25, 1971, Oklahoma suffered a dramatic 35–31 loss to the University of Nebraska, in what was called "The Game of the Century". Both were Big Eight teams, and this was Oklahoma's only loss of the season; while Nebraska finished as national champions, with a 13–0 record. At the time Nebraska was ranked No. 1 nationally and Oklahoma No. 2. In 2019, a 150-member panel of experts organized by ESPN rated this the greatest college football game ever played, among a list of 150 games considered candidates for the greatest college football game ever.

Pruitt had only 10 carries for 53 yards in the game, though he played an important blocking role for Oklahoma quarterback Jack Mildren who had 31 carries. This was due in significant part to Nebraska's ability to limit Pruitt's outside rushing attempts. Oklahoma's assistant coach Barry Switzer said after the game that this was an oversight by Oklahoma; "He's [Pruitt] a gamebreaker and we probably should have put the ball in his hands at least 25 times . . . They kept us from getting it to him on the outside, so we should have forced it to him with belly plays or off-tackle".

Oklahoma defeated the Auburn Tigers in the January 1, 1972 Sugar Bowl, 40–22. The Sooners rushed for a Sugar Bowl record 439 yards, with Pruitt contributing 95 yards on 18 carries and one rushing touchdown; without a reception. Oklahoma was ranked No.2 nationally at the end of the season.

=== Senior (1972) ===
As a senior (1972), Pruitt rushed for 938 yards on 152 carries in the regular season. He led the Big Eight with 13 rushing touchdowns. He also had seven pass receptions for 102 yards, and another touchdown. Oklahoma defeated Penn State in the January 1, 1973 Sugar Bowl, 14–0, and was ranked No. 2 nationally at the end of the 1972 season. Pruitt had 86 yards on 21 carries, and 43 yards on two pass receptions.

Pruitt played in the Hula Bowl after his senior season, and was named the game's outstanding player. He played in the July 1973 Chicago Charities College All-Star Game against the Miami Dolphins.

In 33 regular season games with the Sooners (1970 to 1972), Pruit totaled 2,844 rushing yards and 450 receiving yards, with 35 rushing touchdowns and three receiving touchdowns. He averaged 120.9 all-purpose yards per game. His 7.6 yards per carry average is the highest in school history for anyone with more than 150 rushing attempts. During his career at Oklahoma he set records for all-purpose yards in a game (374) and a season (1,940). He also averaged 13.9 yards per punt return and 19.9 yards per kickoff return. In three post-season college bowl games playing for Oklahoma, he rushed for another 282 yards with three more rushing touchdowns, and had 43 receiving yards.

== Professional career ==
=== Cleveland Browns ===
Despite Pruitt's stellar college career, concerns about his lack of size (he entered the draft at just 177 pounds) led to him not being drafted until the Cleveland Browns selected him with the 30th pick of the second round of the 1973 NFL draft. Pruitt's college coach Chuck Fairbanks became the New England Patriots' new coach in January 1973, a few days before the January 30, 1973 NFL draft. The Patriots had three opportunities to draft Pruitt before he was selected by the Browns, but did not do so. Pruitt felt slighted, especially as he expected to be a first round selection. Pruitt was aware that his size was an issue, and was concerned if his own coach, whom he had brought so much success in college, doubted in him, this could affect how other teams perceived him. Browns' coach Nick Skorich did not want to select Pruitt in the second round because of his size, but Browns' owner Art Modell saw Pruitt as a potential successor to Hall of Fame running back Leroy Kelly and overruled Skorich. Modell believed the 1973 draft was potentially the most important draft since he had purchased the team in 1961.

As a rookie in 1973, Pruitt played in 13 games, but did not start any. He rushed for 369 yards on 69 carries, averaging six yards per carry with four rushing touchdowns. He also had nine pass receptions for 110 yards and a receiving touchdown. Pruitt returned 16 punts for 180 yards (11.3 yards per return) and 16 kickoffs for 453 yards (28.6 yards per return). That season, Ron Smith led the NFL in punt return average (13 yards per return) and Wallace Francis led the league in kickoff return average (29.9 yards per return). As a rookie, Pruitt was selected to play in the Pro Bowl as a kick returner.

In 1974, Pruitt started nine games at halfback and led the Browns with 540 rushing yards and a 4.3 yards per carry average. He scored three rushing touchdowns. Pruitt also had 21 receptions for 274 yards and a receiving touchdown. He returned 27 punts for 349 yards (12.9 yards per return) and 22 kickoffs for 606 yards (27.5 yards) per return. He was fourth in the NFL in yards per kickoff return and all-purpose yards, and eighth in yards per punt return. In a November 10 game against the New England Patriots, he returned the opening kickoff 88 yards for a touchdown; and had a 25-yard punt return later in that game. Earlier that season, he returned a punt 72 yards against the Denver Broncos to set up a game winning touchdown. Pruitt was selected to play in the Pro Bowl for a second consecutive season.

Pruitt's breakout season as a running back came in 1975. He started all 14 games and led the Browns with 1,067 rushing yards on 217 carries (4.9 yards per carry). He had eight rushing touchdowns, and also had 44 receptions for 299 yards with a receiving touchdown. He was second on the team in receptions. Pruitt returned 13 punts for 130 yards and 14 kickoffs for 302 yards. This was his last season returning punts for the Browns, and he only returned three kickoffs for them over the following six years.

Pruitt wanted to reach 1,000 yards rushing in the Browns' final home game of the season (December 14). He needed to rush for 184 yards against the Kansas City Chiefs to achieve that goal. Pruitt had arguably the greatest game of his professional career that day, rushing for 213 yards on 26 carries with three rushing touchdowns, and another 23 yards on three receptions. In 1975, Pruitt was tied for third in the NFL with Terry Metcalf in rushing average, was fifth in all-purpose yards and sixth in total rushing yards.

Pruitt led the Browns with 1,000 yards rushing in 1976, averaging 4.8 yards per carry with four rushing touchdowns. He also had 45 receptions (second most on the Browns) for 341 yards and a receiving touchdown. He was selected to the Pro Bowl as a running back for the first time, and United Press International (UPI) named his second-team All-American Football Conference (AFC). He was ninth in the NFL in yards from scrimmage. In 1977, he led the Browns with 1,086 yards, averaging 4.6 yards per carry with three rushing touchdowns. He was again second on the team in receptions with 37, for 471 yards and one receiving touchdown. Pruitt was third in the NFL in yards from scrimmage and seventh in total rushing yards. He was once more selected to the Pro Bowl as a running back, with the UPI naming him second-team All-AFC and the Newspaper Enterprise Association naming him second-team All-Pro.

1978 was Pruitt's last productive season with the Browns, though he suffered leg and ankle problems during that season. He suffered a calf injury in the second game of the season that required surgery and caused him to miss four games. In 12 games that season he gained 960 rushing yards and led the team in rushing for a fifth consecutive season; but 521 of those yards came in just four games. Pruitt had a 5.5 yards per carry rushing average (the best average during his career as a starter), and three rushing touchdowns. He was tied for second on the team in receptions (38), with 292 receiving yards and two receiving touchdowns. After rushing for over 100 yards in each of the 1978 season's first two games, he did not regain his form until the 14th game of the season when he rushed for 113 yards on 12 carries and had 46 receiving yards on three catches. He had 138 rushing yards and 69 receiving yards the next week, and 182 rushing yards on 22 carries in the season's final game.

Over his final three seasons in Cleveland (1979 to 1981), Pruitt only had a three-year total of 133 carries for 474 yards. In 1979 Pruitt injured his knee and played in only six games, missing most of the season after having knee surgery. The knee injury and surgery continued to affect Pruitt in ensuing seasons, and he became more of a pass receiver out of the backfield than a runner. He was a favorite passing target for Browns' quarterback Brian Sipe in his last two Browns' seasons. In 1980, Pruitt started nine of 16 games in which he appeared. He had 117 rushing yards in 40 carries (averaging a career-worst 2.9 yards per carry), but 444 yards on 50 receptions and five receiving touchdowns. In 1981, he started six games with only 124 rushing yards in 31 carries; but he had a career high 65 receptions for 635 yards and four receiving touchdowns.

In April 1982, the Browns traded Pruitt to the Oakland Raiders for future draft considerations. This was a conditional draft choice that turned out to be an 11th round selection because he played sparingly in 1982 for the Raiders. In nine years with the Browns, Pruitt started 83 games. He rushed for 5,496 yards with 25 touchdowns and a 4.7 yards per carry average (third best among all Browns players with at least 1,000 carries through 2025). He had 323 receptions for 3,022 yards and 19 receiving touchdowns. He returned 56 punts for 659 yards, and 58 kickoffs for 1,523 yards and one touchdown.

=== Los Angeles Raiders ===
The Raiders moved to Los Angeles before the 1982 season started. The Raiders used Pruitt mainly as a return specialist, a role he had not been in since 1975. In 1982, Pruitt returned 27 punts for 209 yards, and 14 kickoffs for 371 yards. In 1983, the 32-year old Pruitt returned 58 punts for 666 yards (11.5 yards per return). He also returned 31 kickoffs for 604 yards. Pruitt led the NFL in punt returns, total punt return yards, and combined kick and punt returns. He was second in punt return average and combined kick and punt return yards. He was selected to the Pro Bowl for the fifth time in his career, and selected as a return specialist for the first time since 1974. Pro Football Weekly named him first-team All-Conference. He had a 97-yard punt return for a touchdown against the Washington Redskins, the longest punt return of the 1983 NFL season.

The Raiders defeated Washington later that season in Super Bowl XVIII, to win the NFL championship. Pruitt had five rushing attempts for 17 yards in the Super Bowl. He also returned one kickoff for 17 yards and one punt for eight yards. In the earlier AFC divisional playoff round win over the Pittsburgh Steelers, 38–10, Pruitt returned five punts for 47 yards. In his final season with the Raiders (1984), Pruitt returned 53 punts for 473 yards, and only three kickoffs.

In three years with the Raiders, Pruitt returned 138 punts for 1,348 yards and one touchdown, and 48 kickoffs for 991 yards. He rushed for 176 yards with two touchdowns and 4.6 yards per carry average; and caught five passes for 47 yards. Pruitt finished his 12-year NFL career with 5,672 rushing yards, 3,069 receiving yards, 47 total touchdowns, and 13,262 all-purpose yards.

== Legacy and honors ==
In 1999, Pruitt was inducted to the College Football Hall of Fame. In 1972, the Touchdown Club of Washington D.C. named him Player of the Year. In 2001, he was in the first class of inductees to the Cleveland Browns Legends. His 7.6 yards per carry average in college is sixth best all-time (through 2025). At the time the Browns' traded Pruitt, he was third all-time among Browns' players in rushing attempts, yards, and touchdowns, behind only future Hall of Fame running backs Jim Brown and Leroy Kelly. He was later passed by Nick Chubb and former teammate Mike Pruitt and is fifth all-time in total rushing yards (through 2025).

An African-American, Pruitt was one of the first Black Sooners players to achieve All-American status. He established himself as Oklahoma's best player during a time when other Southern Universities had not fully desegregated their Football teams. However, the Big Eight conference (which Oklahoma was a part of) established itself as the best collegiate football conference in the country by the start of the 1970s: each team was fully integrated, and much of their success owed largely to their Black players. Pruitt's performance against Southeastern Conference schools Alabama and Auburn in the 1970 Astro-Bluebonnett Bowl and 1972 Sugar Bowl, respectively, helped accelerate each team's integration expanding their recruitment of Black players.

After the 1969 University of Texas Longhorns team was the last non-integrated team to be ranked No. 1, Oklahoma and Big Eight archrival University of Nebraska became dominant teams in college football. Both Oklahoma and Nebraska had actively recruited Black players who played key roles on their teams, such as Johnny Rodgers and Rich Glover at Nebraska and Pruitt at Oklahoma. After losing to Texas in 1970, Oklahoma won every game it played against Texas from 1971 to 1975. Nebraska was ranked No. 1 by the AP in 1970 and 1972, and Oklahoma was ranked No. 2 by the AP in both 1971 and 1972. Nebraska's dramatic 35–31 win over Oklahoma in 1971 was called a "Game of the Century". Rodgers, Pruitt and Glover received the most votes for the 1972 Heisman Trophy. Pruitt said of those times, "I think that our play and our success on those football teams opened the door for a lot of Black kids that followed us". (It was also widely reported that before facing Oklahoma in December 1970 and being crushed by Nebraska in the January 1972 Orange Bowl, Alabama's Bear Bryant had wanted to recruit Black players. However, he faced stiff resistance from within the school; and it was after Sam Cunningham's dominant performance for the University of Southern California in a win over Alabama in September 1970, that Bryant became determined Alabama needed to recruit black players.)

As a college senior, Pruitt was 5 ft 9 in (1.75 m) 176 lb (79.8 kg), and as an NFL player was listed as 5 ft 10 in (1.78 m) 190 lb (86 kg). Pruitt's lack of size motivated him to prove he belonged in the NFL. Pruitt's running philosophy was to make up for his lack of size with constant movements that would make it difficult to tackle him. He was known for his fakes, zigzag running, ability to stop and go, and his speed. Pruitt said "My motto is a train is only dangerous when it's on the track. As long as you stay off the track, you don't have to worry about that track. My style was not running down tracks".

Pruitt began wearing tear-away jerseys at Oklahoma. This was not unique to Pruitt, as other college players also wore tear-away jerseys during that era. He continued wearing them in the NFL, and might go through four to five a game. Pruitt relied on his elusiveness as a runner, but because of his small size defenders could often tackle him by yanking him down by his jersey; a problem the tear-away jersey was meant to eliminate. In 1979, the "Greg Pruitt rule" established tear-away jerseys as illegal.

Since 2011, the Jet Award has been given to the top college punt and kickoff return specialist. The award is named after Nebraska's Johnny Rodgers, who was nicknamed "the Jet". Rodgers and Pruitt became good friends during their college years and remained friends. The award winner is presented with a statuette of Rodgers running with a ball tucked in his arm, and another player attempting to tackle Rodgers but missing the tackle and falling to the ground behind Rodgers. The other figure in the statue is Pruitt. This is based on a punt return in the November 1971 "Game of the Century" meeting between Oklahoma and Nebraska, during which Rodgers returned a punt 72 yards for a touchdown. Pruitt was the first Oklahoma player down the field on defense covering the punt return, but Rodgers eluded Pruitt's initial effort to make a tackle on the play, before going on to score a touchdown.

Pruitt's awards and honors include, among others;

- Inducted into the College Football Hall of Fame (1999)
- Inducted into Cleveland Browns Legends (2001)
- Super Bowl Champion (1984)
- Touchdown Club of Washington D. C. Player of the Year (1972)
- Unanimous All-American (1972)
- Unanimous All-American (1971)
- Big Eight offensive player of the year (1971)
- All-Big Eight (1972)
- Academic All-Big Eight (1972)
- All-Big Eight (1971)
- 5x Pro Bowl selection (1973, 1974, 1976, 1977, 1983)
- 2x Sugar Bowl Champion (1971, 1972)

== Personal life ==
After retiring from professional football, Pruitt owned Pruitt Energy Sources in Houston.

Pruitt's son, Greg Pruitt Jr., attended North Carolina Central University (NCCU), and in three seasons on the school's football team became the school's all-time leading rusher. In 2014, he was inducted into NCCU's Alex M. Rivera Athletics Hall of Fame.

In 1979, Pruitt won ABC's Superstars, an all-around sports competition that pits elite athletes from different sports against one another in a series of athletic events resembling a decathlon.

In 1991, Pruitt competed in the sports-entertainment TV game show, American Gladiators, on a team with former NFL players Cliff Branch, Jack Ham, Jim Kiick, Phil Villapiano, and Charles White.

== NFL career statistics ==
Legend
	Super Bowl champion
	Led the league
**Bold**	Career high

Year	Team	Games		Rushing						Receiving					Fumbles	
Year	Team	GP	GS	Att	Yds	Avg	Y/G	Lng	TD	Rec	Yds	Avg	Lng	TD	Fum	FR
1973	CLE	13	0	61	369	**6.0**	28.4	65	4	9	110	12.2	42	1	7	2
1974	CLE	14	9	126	540	4.3	38.6	54	3	21	274	13.0	43	1	10	2
1975	CLE	14	**14**	217	1,067	4.9	76.2	50	**8**	44	299	6.8	48	1	10	2
1976	CLE	14	13	209	1,000	4.8	71.4	64	4	45	341	7.6	27	1	7	0
1977	CLE	14	**14**	**236**	**1,086**	4.6	77.6	**78**	3	37	471	12.7	**60**	1	8	3
1978	CLE	12	12	176	960	5.5	**80.0**	70	3	38	292	7.7	26	2	**12**	1
1979	CLE	6	6	62	233	3.8	38.8	27	0	14	155	11.1	27	1	1	1
1980	CLE	**16**	9	40	117	2.9	7.3	19	0	50	444	8.9	43	**5**	1	0
1981	CLE	15	6	31	124	4.0	8.3	15	0	**65**	**636**	9.8	33	4	3	0
1982	RAI	9	0	4	22	5.5	2.4	13	0	2	29	**14.5**	23	1	5	4
1983	RAI	**16**	0	26	154	5.9	9.6	18	2	1	6	6.0	6	0	10	**7**
1984	RAI	15	0	8	0	0.0	0.0	0	0	2	12	6.0	8	0	9	2
Career		158	83	1,196	5,672	4.7	35.9	78	27	328	3,069	9.4	60	18	83	24
