= Paul Seymour =

Paul Seymour may refer to:

- Paul Seymour (basketball) (1928–1998), American basketball player and coach
- Paul Seymour (American football) (born 1950), American football player
- Paul Seymour (mathematician) (born 1950), professor at Princeton University
