= B.C. Elmore High School =

Former school in Texas, United States

Coordinates: 29.8099°N 95.2760°W

Bennie Carl Elmore High School

Information
- Other name: B.C. Elmore Middle School (1972-1999)
- Opened: 1957
- Closed: 1972
- Last updated: 29 December 2017

Bennie Carl Elmore High School was a senior high school in Houston, Texas. It was a part of the East and Mount Houston Independent School District. It was a school for black students, and it served the community of Settegast.

It opened in 1957. Its namesake served as the principal from 1957 to 1969. The 27 classroom building had a cost of $513,113.00. It was converted into a junior high school on when Forest Brook High School opened in 1972. The building was razed and replaced with a new middle school structure in 1999. In 2013 this new campus became the B.C. Elmore Elementary School of the Houston Independent School District.

During its life its main feeder grade schools were Settegast School and Hilliard School.

== Athletics ==
University of Oklahoma American football line coach Bill Michael liked to recruit players from Elmore. He personally recruited Elmore student Greg Pruitt. According to Pruitt, at Elmore athletes had a high status and the school had a tradition of winning athletic games. Pruitt also said that B.C. Elmore played athletic games against all-white schools as well as black schools.
