= Gary Butler (tight end) =

American football player (born 1951)

No. 82, 81
- Position: Tight end

Personal information
- Born: January 11, 1951 (age 75); Houston, Texas, U.S.
- Listed height: 6 ft 3 in (1.91 m)
- Listed weight: 235 lb (107 kg)

Career information
- High school: Conroe (Conroe, Texas)
- College: Rice
- NFL draft: 1973: 2nd round, 27th overall pick

Career history
- Kansas City Chiefs (1973–1974); Chicago Bears (1975); Tampa Bay Buccaneers (1977)

Awards and highlights
- Second-team All-American (1972); 2× First-team All-SWC (1972, 1973)

Career NFL statistics
- Receptions: 9
- Receiving yards: 145
- Receiving touchdowns: 2
- Stats at Pro Football Reference

Gary Butler (born January 11, 1951) is an American former professional football player who was a tight end in the National Football League (NFL). After playing college football for the Rice Owls, Butler was selected in the second round of the 1973 NFL Draft by the Kansas City Chiefs. He played two seasons in Kansas City before joining the Chicago Bears for 1975. After a year off of football he played for the Tampa Bay Buccaneers.
