= 1977 Miami Dolphins season =

12th season in franchise history

- Head coach: Don Shula
- Home stadium: Orange Bowl

Results
- Record: 10–4
- Division place: 2nd AFC East
- Playoffs: Did not qualify
- Pro Bowlers: 5 QB Bob Griese; HB/PR Delvin Williams; C Jim Langer; G Bob Kuechenberg; K Garo Yepremian

The 1977 Miami Dolphins season was the team's 12th as a member of the National Football League (NFL). The Dolphins improved upon their previous season's output of 6–8, winning ten games.

== Season summary ==
After suffering their first losing season under Coach Don Shula, the Dolphins bounced back to finish 10–4. Bob Griese had a stellar year, despite being forced to wear thick eyeglasses due to a problem with his contacts. Griese, whose season was highlighted by a six touchdown game in St. Louis against the Cardinals, was named Player of the year by the Maxwell Club of Philadelphia. Despite the improvement, the team failed to qualify for the playoffs for the third straight season.

== Offseason ==
=== NFL draft ===
1977 Miami Dolphins draft
Round	Pick	Player	Position	College	Notes
1	13	A.J. Duhe *	Linebacker	LSU	
2	40	Bob Baumhower *	Nose tackle	Alabama	
3	71	Mike Watson	Offensive tackle	Miami (OH)	
5	113	Mike Michel	Punter	Stanford	
5	123	Leroy Harris	Running back	Arkansas State	
7	180	Bruce Herron	Linebacker	New Mexico	
8	207	Horace Perkins	Defensive back	Colorado	
9	237	Robert Turner	Running back	Oklahoma State	
10	264	Mark Carter	Offensive tackle	Eastern Michigan	
11	291	John Alexander	Defensive end	Rutgers	
12	321	Terry Anderson	Wide receiver	Bethune-Cookman	
Made roster * Made at least one Pro Bowl during career

== Personnel ==
=== Coaches / Staff ===
1977 Miami Dolphins staff
Front office: President – Joe Robbie; Vice President – Don Shula; Director of Player Personnel – Bobby Beathard; Head coaches: Head Coach – Don Shula; Offensive coaches: Offense/Receivers/Passing Game – Howard Schnellenberger; Offensive Backs – Carl Taseff; Offensive Line/Running Game – John Sandusky	Defensive coaches: Assistant Head Coach/Defense – Bill Arnsparger; Defensive Line/Run Defense – Mike Scarry; Defensive Backs – Tom Keane; Special teams coaches: Special Teams – Carl Taseff; Punting – Tom Keane; Strength and conditioning: None - N/A

=== Roster ===
1977 Miami Dolphins roster
Quarterbacks (QB): 12 Bob Griese; 10 Don Strock; Running backs (RB): 31 Norm Bulaich; 27 Gary Davis; 38 Leroy Harris; 32 Benny Malone; 36 Don Nottingham; Wide receivers (WR): 85 Terry Anderson; 82 Duriel Harris; 89 Nat Moore; 86 Freddie Solomon; Tight ends (TE): 88 Jim Mandich; 80 Loaird McCreary; 87 Andre Tillman	Offensive linemen (OL): 71 Mike Current T; 67 Bob Kuechenberg G; 62 Jim Langer C; 66 Larry Little G; 79 Wayne Moore T; 64 Ed Newman G; 65 Wally Pesuit T; 74 Steve Young T; Defensive linemen (DL): 76 John Alexander DE; 73 Bob Baumhower NT; 77 A. J. Duhe DE; 75 Rick Dvorak DE; 72 Bob Heinz DE; 68 Bill Windauer DE	Linebackers (LB): 52 Larry Ball OLB; 58 Kim Bokamper OLB; 51 Rusty Chambers ILB; 50 Larry Gordon OLB; 53 Bob Matheson ILB; 59 Guy Roberts ILB; 56 Steve Towle ILB; Defensive backs (DB): 40 Dick Anderson SS; 44 Charles Cornelius CB; 25 Tim Foley SS; 45 Curtis Johnson CB; 42 Vern Roberson FS; 41 Norris Thomas CB; 21 Rick Volk FS; Special teams (ST): 17 Mike Michel P; 20 Larry Seiple P; 1 Garo Yepremian K	Reserve: 49 Charlie Babb S (IR); 78 Carl Barisich NT (IR); 83 Vern Den Herder DE (IR); 54 Bruce Herron LB (IR); 57 Mike Kolen LB (IR); 55 Earnie Rhone LB (IR); Rookies in italics

== Schedule ==
Dolphins quarterback Bob Griese would throw for six touchdown passes in a Thanksgiving Day match versus the St. Louis Cardinals. The Dolphins would set a franchise record for most points scored in one game with 55. Of note, the Dolphins would score eight touchdowns and accumulate 34 first downs.

Week	Date	Opponent	Result	Record	Venue	Attendance
1	September 18	at **Buffalo Bills**	**W** 13–0	1–0	Rich Stadium	76,097
2	September 25	at San Francisco 49ers	**W** 19–15	2–0	Candlestick Park	40,503
3	October 2	**Houston Oilers**	**W** 27–7	3–0	Miami Orange Bowl	49,619
4	October 9	at **Baltimore Colts**	**L** 28–45	3–1	Memorial Stadium	57,829
5	October 16	**New York Jets**	**W** 21–17	4–1	Miami Orange Bowl	43,446
6	October 23	Seattle Seahawks	**W** 31–13	5–1	Miami Orange Bowl	29,855
7	October 30	San Diego Chargers	**L** 13–14	5–2	Miami Orange Bowl	40,670
8	November 6	at **New York Jets**	**W** 14–10	6–2	Shea Stadium	51,582
9	November 13	**New England Patriots**	**W** 17–5	7–2	Miami Orange Bowl	67,502
10	November 20	at Cincinnati Bengals	**L** 17–23	7–3	Riverfront Stadium	46,733
11	November 24	at St. Louis Cardinals	**W** 55–14	8–3	Busch Memorial Stadium	50,269
12	December 5	**Baltimore Colts**	**W** 17–6	9–3	Miami Orange Bowl	68,977
13	December 11	at New England Patriots	**L** 10–14	9–4	Schaefer Stadium	61,064
14	December 17	**Buffalo Bills**	**W** 31–14	10–4	Miami Orange Bowl	39,626
Note: Intra-division opponents are in **bold** text.

=== Results ===
==== Week 11 ====
Team	1	2	3	4	Total
• Dolphins	14	14	20	7	55
Cardinals	7	0	0	7	14

- Date: November 24
- Location: Busch Stadium, St. Louis, Missouri
- Game start: 2:30 p.m.
- Game weather: 39 °F (4 °C); Wind 8 mph (13 km/h)
- TV announcers (NBC): Curt Gowdy and John Brodie

Scoring summary
1	MIA	Nat Moore 4 yard pass from Bob Griese (Garo Yepremian kick)	MIA 7–0
1	MIA	Duriel Harris 7 yard pass from Bob Griese (Garo Yepremian kick)	MIA 14–0
1	STL	Terry Metcalf 1 yard run (Jim Bakken kick)	MIA 14–7
2	MIA	Nat Moore 9 yard pass from Bob Griese (Garo Yepremian kick)	MIA 21–7
2	MIA	Nat Moore 28 yard pass from Bob Griese (Garo Yepremian kick)	MIA 28–7
3	MIA	Gary Davis 17 yard pass from Bob Griese (kick failed)	MIA 34–7
3	MIA	Andre Tillman 37 yard pass from Bob Griese (Garo Yepremian kick)	MIA 41–7
3	MIA	Leroy Harris 4 yard run (Garo Yepremian kick)	MIA 48–7
4	STL	Ike Harris 19 yard pass from Jim Hart (Jim Bakken kick)	MIA 48–14
4	MIA	Benny Malone 4 yard run (Garo Yepremian kick)	MIA 55–14

- Bob Griese 15/23, 207 Yds, 6 TD, INT

=== Standings ===
AFC East
	W	L	T	PCT	DIV	CONF	PF	PA	STK
^{(2)} Baltimore Colts	10	4	0	.714	6–2	9–3	295	221	W1
Miami Dolphins	10	4	0	.714	6–2	8–4	313	197	W1
New England Patriots	9	5	0	.643	4–4	7–5	278	217	L1
New York Jets	3	11	0	.214	2–6	2–10	191	300	L2
Buffalo Bills	3	11	0	.214	2–6	2–10	160	313	L1

== Awards and honors ==
- Bob Griese, Bert Bell Award
