= Terry Anderson (American football) =

American football player (born 1955)

No. 85, 81, 20
- Position: Wide receiver

Personal information
- Born: January 10, 1955 (age 71); Eastover, South Carolina, U.S.
- Listed height: 5 ft 9 in (1.75 m)
- Listed weight: 182 lb (83 kg)

Career information
- High school: Dorchester (MA)
- College: Bethune-Cookman
- NFL draft: 1977: 12th round, 321st overall pick

Career history
- Miami Dolphins (1977–1978); Washington Redskins (1978); San Francisco 49ers (1980)

Career NFL statistics
- Receptions: 1
- Receiving yards: 56
- Stats at Pro Football Reference

Terry C. Anderson (born January 10, 1955) is an American former professional football player who was a wide receiver in the National Football League (NFL) for the Miami Dolphins, the Washington Redskins, and the San Francisco 49ers. He played college football for the Bethune–Cookman Wildcats and was selected 321st overall in the 12th round of the 1977 NFL draft.

Anderson is now a dean of students and football coach at Rangeview High School in Aurora, Colorado.
