= 1971 All-Atlantic Coast Conference football team =

American college football all-star team

The 1971 All-Atlantic Coast Conference football team consists of American football players chosen by various selectors for their All-Atlantic Coast Conference ("ACC") teams for the 1971 NCAA University Division football season. Selectors in 1971 included the Associated Press (AP).

== All-Atlantic Coast Conference selections ==
=== Offensive selections ===
==== Ends ====
- John McMakin, Clemson (AP)
- Don Bungori, Maryland (AP)

==== Offensive tackles ====
- Ed Newman, Duke (AP)
- Jerry Sain, North Carolina (AP)

==== Offensive guards ====
- Ron Rusnak, North Carolina (AP)
- Bill Bobbora, Wake Forest (AP)

==== Centers ====
- Bob Thornton, North Carolina (AP)

==== Backs ====
- Larry Hopkins, Wake Forest (AP)
- Larry Russell, Wake Forest (AP)
- Lewis Jolley, North Carolina (AP)
- Paul Miller, North Carolina (AP)

=== Defensive selections ===
==== Defensive ends ====
- Bill Brafford, North Carolina (AP)
- Wayne Baker, Clemson (AP)

==== Defensive tackles ====
- Andy Selfridge, Virginia (AP)
- Bud Grissom, North Carolina (AP)

==== Linebackers ====
- John Bunting, North Carolina (AP)
- Ed Stetz, Wake Forest (AP)
- Larry Hefner, Clemson (AP)

==== Defensive backs ====
- Ernie Jackson, Duke (AP)
- Rick Searl, Duke (AP)
- Steve Bowden, Wake Forest (AP)
- Bill Hanenburg, Duke (AP)

=== Special teams ===
==== Kickers ====
- Ken Craven, North Carolina (AP)

== Key ==
AP = Associated Press

== See also ==
- 1971 College Football All-America Team
