= 1972 All-Southwest Conference football team =

American college football all-star team

The 1972 All-Southwest Conference football team consists of American football players chosen, at each position, as the best players in the Southwest Conference during the 1972 NCAA University Division football season. The selectors for the 1972 season included the Associated Press (AP), selected by the conference coaches, and the United Press International (UPI).

The AP also conducted balloting for coach of the year (Grant Teaff, Baylor), player of the year (running back Roosevelt Leaks of Texas), offensive player of the year (Leaks), defensive player of the year (defensive end Roger Goree of Baylor), and newcomer of the year (Leaks).

The UPI also conducted balloting for offensive player of the year (Leaks), defensive player of the year (Goree), sophomore player of the year (Leaks), and freshman player of the year (Wayne Morris, SMU). Two players were unanimous choices by the UPI voters: Leaks and offensive tackle Jerry Sisemore.

== All Southwest selections ==
=== Offense ===
==== Quarterbacks ====
- Alan Lowry, Texas (AP-1, UPI-1)
- Joe Barnes, Texas Tech (AP-2, UPI-2)

==== Fullbacks ====
- Roosevelt Leaks, Texas (AP-1, UPI-1 [rb])

==== Running backs ====
- Dickey Morton, Arkansas (AP-1, UPI-1)
- Mike Luttrell, TCU (AP-1, UPI-2)
- Alvin Maxson, SMU (AP-2, UPI-1)
- Gary Lacy, Baylor (AP-2)
- Wayne Morris, SMU (AP-2, UPI-2)
- Doug McCutchen, Texas Tech (UPI-2)

==== Tight ends ====
- Gary Butler, Rice (AP-1, UPI-1)
- Homer May, Texas A&M (AP-2, UPI-2)

==== Split ends ====
- Kenny Harrison, SMU (AP-2, UPI-1)
- Charles Dancer, Baylor (UPI-2)

==== Wide receivers ====
- Ed Collins, Rice (AP-1)

==== Offensive tackles ====
- Jerry Sisemore, Texas (AP-1, UPI-1)
- Ron Waedemon, Rice (AP-1, UPI-1)
- Don Deweber, SMU (AP-2, UPI-2)
- Steve Oxley, Texas (AP-2)
- Richard Mason, Baylor (UPI-2)

==== Offensive guards ====
- Travis Roach, Texas (AP-1, UPI-1)
- Guy Morriss, TCU (AP-1, UPI-2)
- Tom Reed, Arkansas (AP-2, UPI-1)
- Don Crosslin, Texas (AP-2)
- Harold Lyons, Texas Tech (UPI-2)

==== Centers ====
- Russell Ingram, Texas Tech (AP-1, UPI-1)
- Bill Wyman, Texas (AP-2, UPI-2)

=== Defense ===
==== Defensive ends ====
- Roger Goree, Baylor (AP-1, UPI-1)
- Malcolm Minnick, Texas (AP-1, UPI-1)
- Gaines Baty, Texas Tech (AP-2, UPI-2)
- Ed Johnson, SMU (AP-2)
- Larry Walling, Rice (UPI-2)

==== Defensive tackles ====
- Louis Kelcher, SMU (AP-1, UPI-1)
- Charlie Davis, TCU (AP-1, UPI-1)
- Boice Best, Texas A&M (AP-2, UPI-2)
- Don Wunderly, Arkansas (AP-2)
- Doug English, Texas (UPI-2)

==== Nose guard ====
- Donald Rives, Texas Tech (AP-1, UPI-1 [linebacker])

==== Linebackers ====
- Randy Braband, Texas (AP-1, UPI-1)
- Glen Gaspard, Texas (AP-1, UPI-1)
- Grady Hoermann, Texas A&M (AP-1)
- Dede Terveen, TCU (AP-2)
- Leonard Carey, SMU (AP-2, UPI-2)
- Quintin Robinson, Texas Tech (AP-2)
- Ed Simonini, Texas A&M (UPI-2)

==== Defensive backs ====
- Robert Popelka, SMU (AP-1, UPI-1)
- Bruce Henley, Rice (AP-1, UPI-1)
- Lyle Blackwood, TCU (AP-1, UPI-1)
- Robert Murski, Texas A&M (AP-1, UPI-2)
- Tommy Stewart, Baylor (AP-2, UPI-1)
- Mike Rowan, Texas (AP-2, UPI-2)
- Louis Campbell, Arkansas (AP-2, UPI-2)
- Ira Dean, Baylor (AP-2)
- Mike Bayer, Texas (UPI-2)

== Key ==
AP = Associated Press

UPI = United Press International

Bold = Consensus first-team selection of both the AP and UP

== See also ==
- 1972 College Football All-America Team
