= Travis Roach =

American football player (1950–1988)

- Roach, circa 1971

No. 61, 63
- Position: Offensive guard

Personal information
- Born: March 18, 1950; Hamilton, Texas, U.S.
- Died: May 30, 1988 (aged 38); Austin, Texas, U.S.
- Listed height: 6 ft 2 in (1.88 m)
- Listed weight: 260 lb (118 kg)

Career information
- High school: Marlin (Marlin, Texas)
- College: Texas
- NFL draft: 1973: 6th round, 144th overall pick

Career history
- BC Lions (1973); New York Jets (1974)

Awards and highlights
- Consensus national champion (1969); First-team All-SWC (1972)
- Stats at Pro Football Reference

Travis Morgan Roach Jr. (March 18, 1950 – May 30, 1988) was an American professional football offensive guard who played for the New York Jets of the National Football League (NFL). He played college football for the Texas Longhorns and was selected by the Jets in the sixth round of the 1973 NFL draft.

== Early life ==
Travis Morgan Roach Jr. was born on March 18, 1950, in Hamilton, Texas. He played high school football at Marlin High School in Marlin, Texas.

== College career ==
Roach enrolled at the University of Texas to play college football for the Longhorns. He played for the freshman team in 1968 as a defensive guard. He earned a varsity letter in 1969 as a backup defensive tackle. The 1969 Longhorns were consensus national champions. Roach converted to offensive guard in 1970. He redshirted the 1970 season in order to get more experience training on offense. He was then a two-year varsity starter from 1971 to 1972. Roach was named first-team All-Southwest Conference by both the Associated Press and United Press International as a senior in 1972.

== Professional career ==
Roach was selected by the New York Jets in the sixth round, with the 144th overall pick, of the 1973 NFL draft. However, he instead signed with the BC Lions of the Canadian Football League on April 30, 1973. He started the Lions' regular season opener on July 31, 1973, but was released afterwards.

Roach signed with the Jets for the 1974 season. He played in all 14 games in 1974 as a reserve offensive guard and special teams player. He was noted for always wearing coveralls in his personal life. Roach retired from football on July 25, 1975, stating he had a "better chance" to make the team than he did the year before but he did not think he could be an "outstanding player". Roach elaborated "I don't want to be mediocre at anything. I've gone to grad school in accounting where my grades have been A's; here they're C's."

== Personal life ==
Roach graduated from Baylor University with an accounting degree and from Baylor Law School. He moved to Austin, Texas, where he became a sports agent. He authorized a bill that required sports agents in Texas to be bonded. In 1987, the bill was passed by the Texas State Legislature. Roach was diagnosed with a brain tumor in October 1987, and died on May 30, 1988, in Austin, Texas.
