= Ron Rusnak =

American football player (born 1951)

No. 62
- Position: Guard

Personal information
- Born: September 8, 1951 (age 75)
- Listed height: 6 ft 2 in (1.88 m)
- Listed weight: 220 lb (100 kg)

Career information
- College: North Carolina (1971–1972)

Awards and highlights
- Consensus All-American (1972); Jacobs Blocking Trophy (1972); 2× First-team All-ACC (1971, 1972); Sun Bowl Champion (1972); North Carolina Tar Heels Jersey No. 62 honored

Ronald Rusnak (born September 8, 1951) is an American former football player. He grew up in Prince George, Virginia, and played college football at the offensive guard position for the University of North Carolina at Chapel Hill. He played for the 1971 North Carolina Tar Heels football team that compiled an 11-1 record. He was six feet, two inches tall and weighed 220 pounds while playing at North Carolina. He was twice selected as an All-Atlantic Coast Conference (ACC) player and was a unanimous first-team selection to the 1972 College Football All-America Team. He also won the 1972 Jacobs Blocking Trophy as the best blocker in the ACC.
