= Eric Hyman =

American college athletics administrator (born 1950)

Biographical details
- Born: October 9, 1950 (age 76)

Playing career
- 1970–1972: North Carolina
- Position: Defensive tackle

Coaching career (HC unless noted)
- 1973–1975: Furman (GA)
- 1975–1982: Furman (assistant)

Administrative career (AD unless noted)
- 1982–1984: Furman (assistant AD)
- 1984–1991: VMI
- 1995–1998: Miami (OH)
- 1998–2005: TCU
- 2005–2012: South Carolina
- 2012–2016: Texas A&M

Accomplishments and honors

Awards
- First-team All-ACC (1972)

Eric Hyman (born October 9, 1950) is an American former college athletics administrator. He served as the athletic director at the Virginia Military Institute (VMI), Miami University in Oxford, Ohio, Texas Christian University (TCU), the University of South Carolina, and Texas A&M University.

Hyman received his undergraduate degree from the University of North Carolina at Chapel Hill and his masters from Furman University. While attending North Carolina, he was All-Atlantic Coast Conference in 1972 and played in three bowl games. While at Furman, he coached football for nine years (1973–1981) and was an assistant athletic director for two years (1982–1984).

Hyman served as athletic director of Texas Christian University from 1997 to 2005. During this period he was named the 2004 national athletic director of the year.

Hyman came to South Carolina in 2005. He was named the 2003–04 Street and Smith's Business Journal National Athletics Director of the Year and was also selected as the Division I-A West Regional Athletics Director of the Year by the National Association of Collegiate Directors of Athletics (NACDA). In September 2008, he assumed the duties as President of the Division 1A Athletic Directors' Association.

== NCAA Baseball Committee ==
From 2011 to 2015, Hyman served as a member of the NCAA Division I Baseball Committee, charged with selecting teams for the playoffs and assigning regional tournament locations and seedings.
