= Kenny Harrison (American football) =

American football player (born 1953)

No. 83, 89
- Position: Wide receiver

Personal information
- Born: December 12, 1953 (age 72); Port Arthur, Texas, U.S.

Career information
- College: Southern Methodist
- NFL draft: 1976: 9th round, 250th overall pick

Career history
- 1976–1978: San Francisco 49ers
- 1980: Washington Redskins

Awards and highlights
- First-team All-SWC (1972)
- Stats at Pro Football Reference

Kenneth Wayne Harrison (born December 12, 1953) is an American former professional football wide receiver in the National Football League (NFL) for the San Francisco 49ers and Washington Redskins. He played college football at Southern Methodist University and was selected in the ninth round of the 1976 NFL draft.
