= Robert Popelka =

American football player (born 1949)

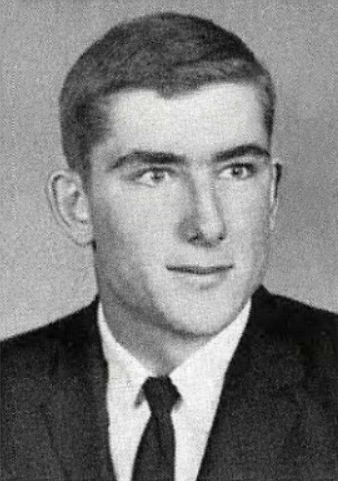
- Popelka from 1967 "Cotton Blossom"

Profile
- Position: Defensive back

Personal information
- Born: November 20, 1949 (age 76)

Career information
- High school: Temple High School
- College: Southern Methodist University
- NFL draft: 1973: 14th round, 359th overall pick

Career history
- 1970–1972: SMU Mustangs

Awards and highlights
- Consensus All-American (1972); Second-team All-American (1971); 2× First-team All-SWC (1971, 1972)

Robert E. Popelka (born November 20, 1949) is an American former football player.

Popelka was raised in Temple, Texas, and played college football as a defensive back for Southern Methodist University. Popelka played tailback in high school but was converted to defense at SMU. In 1971, he intercepted a pass and returned it 76 yards for a touchdown to help SMU to an 18–17 upset victory over Texas Tech. He was a consensus first-team selection to the 1972 College Football All-America Team. He was also twice selected as an All-Southwest Conference player. SMU coach Hayden Fry said of Popelka: "Robert is the best defensive back in America. He has the tools and equipment to do it all. He has 9.7 speed, great quickness, and excellent judgment and timing." He also won the Southwest Conference's Kern Tips Memorial Award in 1972 as the conference's outstanding senior football player.

Popelka was selected 359th overall by the Cleveland Browns in the 14th round of the 1973 NFL draft, He was considered to be too small and too slow for the NFL.

Popelka was inducted into the SMU Hall of Fame in 1983.
