= Lewis Jolley =

American football player (born 1949)

No. 40
- Positions: Running back, kick returner

Personal information
- Born: November 15, 1949 (age 76); Bostic, North Carolina, U.S.
- Listed height: 5 ft 11 in (1.80 m)
- Listed weight: 210 lb (95 kg)

Career information
- College: North Carolina
- NFL draft: 1972: 3rd round, 56th overall pick

Career history
- Houston Oilers (1972–1973); Charlotte Hornets (1974–1975)

Awards and highlights
- First-team All-ACC (1971)

Career NFL statistics
- Rushing attempts: 7
- Rushing yards: 6
- Rushing TDs: 0
- Stats at Pro Football Reference

Lewis Elman Jolley (born November 15, 1949) is an American former professional football player who was a running back for the Houston Oilers of the National Football League (NFL). He played college football for the North Carolina Tar Heels.

Jolley began his college career at the University of North Carolina at Chapel Hill as a wingback after not playing football his senior year in high school due to an injury. He was converted to a running back in 1971, his senior year in college. He capped his college career playing in the December 1971 Gator Bowl, which North Carolina lost to the Georgia Bulldogs by a score of 7-3.

Jolley was selected by the Oilers in the third round of the 1972 NFL draft with the 56th overall pick. He was cut before the 1972 regular season began, but then joined the Oilers' taxi squad before being activated as a special teams player. He returned 11 kickoffs for 267 yards, or 24.3 yards per return. In 1973 for Houston he played in 10 of the team's 14 games, rushed 7 times for 6 yards, had 3 receptions for 56 yards, and returned 2 kickoffs for 41 yards. His last game was also his most active. In a December 2 game against the Oakland Raiders, he rushed 5 times for 1 yard and caught 2 passes for 56 yards. But he also had a critical fumble that led to the Raiders' victory.

The Oilers waived Jolley before the 1974 regular season. After being waived by the Oilers, he signed with the Charlotte Hornets of the World Football League. He played for the Hornets in 1974 and 1975. After the Hornets folded, Jolley became a traveling salesman for Worthington Steel, where he was still working as of 1986.
