= 1972 All-Big Eight Conference football team =

The 1972 All-Big Eight Conference football team consists of American football players chosen by various organizations for All-Big Eight Conference teams for the 1972 NCAA University Division football season. The selectors for the 1972 season included the Associated Press (AP).

== Offensive selections ==
=== Tight ends ===
- Keith Krepfle, Iowa State (AP)

=== Split end ===
- Johnny Rodgers, Nebraska (AP)

=== Offensive tackles ===
- Daryl White, Nebraska (AP)
- Dean Unruh, Oklahoma (AP)

=== Offensive guards ===
- Ken Jones, Oklahoma (AP)
- Geary Murdock, Iowa State (AP)

=== Centers ===
- Tom Brahaney, Oklahoma (AP)

=== Quarterbacks ===
- George Amundson, Iowa State (AP)

=== Halfbacks ===
- Greg Pruitt, Oklahoma (AP)
- Charlie Davis, Colorado (AP)

=== Fullbacks ===
- Leon Crosswhite, Oklahoma (AP)

== Defensive selections ==
=== Defensive ends ===
- Willie Harper, Nebraska (AP)
- Merv Krakau, Iowa State (AP)

=== Defensive tackles ===
- Derland Moore, Oklahoma (AP)
- Bud Magrum, Colorado (AP)

=== Middle guards ===
- Rich Glover, Nebraska (AP)

=== Linebackers ===
- Eddie Sheats, Kansas (AP)
- Rod Shoate, Oklahoma (AP)
- Cleveland Vann, Oklahoma State (AP)

=== Defensive backs ===
- Cullen Bryant, Colorado (AP)
- Joe Blahak, Nebraska (AP)
- John Stearns, Colorado (AP)

== Key ==
AP = Associated Press

== See also ==
- 1972 College Football All-America Team
