= John Skorupan =

American football player (born 1951)

No. 55, 57
- Position: Linebacker

Personal information
- Born: May 17, 1951 (age 75); Beaver, Pennsylvania, U.S.
- Listed height: 6 ft 2 in (1.88 m)
- Listed weight: 222 lb (101 kg)

Career information
- High school: Beaver
- College: Penn State
- NFL draft: 1973: 6th round, 136th overall pick

Career history
- Buffalo Bills (1973–1977); New York Giants (1978–1980)

Awards and highlights
- Consensus All-American (1972); First-team All-East (1972)

Career NFL statistics
- Sacks: 8
- Fumble recoveries: 6
- Interceptions: 2
- Stats at Pro Football Reference

John Paul Skorupan (born May 17, 1951) is an American former professional football player who was a linebacker for eight seasons in the National Football League (NFL) from 1973 to 1980.

Skorupan was born in Beaver, Pennsylvania, in 1951. He played college football for the Penn State Nittany Lions from 1969 to 1972. He was selected as a consensus first-team linebacker on the 1972 All-America team.

He was then drafted by the Buffalo Bills in the sixth round (136th overall pick) of the 1973 NFL draft. He played for the Bills from 1973 to 1977 and for the New York Giants from 1978 to 1980. He appeared in a total of 92 NFL games, 60 of them as a starter. He was released by the Giants in August 1981.
