= John LeHeup =

American gridiron football player (born 1951)

Profile
- Positions: Defensive end, offensive guard, defensive tackle

Personal information
- Born: October 13, 1951 (age 75); Tampa, Florida, U.S.
- Listed height: 6 ft 2 in (1.88 m)
- Listed weight: 250 lb (113 kg)

Career information
- High school: C. Leon King (Tampa)
- College: South Carolina
- NFL draft: 1973: 10th round, 250th overall pick

Career history
- Montreal Alouettes (1973); Toronto Argonauts (1973); Memphis Southmen (1974-1975); Hamilton Tiger Cats (1976)

Awards and highlights
- First-team All-American (1972); First-team All-Pro Team WFL (1975)

John Douglas LeHeup (born October 13, 1951) is an American former football player. He played four years of professional football as a defensive end, offensive guard, and defensive tackle in the Canadian Football League (CFL) and World Football League (WFL).

LeHeup was born in Tampa, Florida, in 1951 and attended C. Leon King High School in that city. He played college football at South Carolina from 1969 to 1972. He was selected to participate in the 3 all-star games: East/West Shrine Bowl, Hula Bowl and All-American bowl and hold the honor of being the only USC player to ever play 3 all-star games. He was selected by the American Football Coaches Association as a first-team defensive tackle on the 1972 Kodak All-America football team. In 1992, he was elected to the University of South Carolina All-Time team. In 2012, he was elected to USC Athletic Hall of Fame. In 2023 John was selected 5th out of 12 GOAT (Greatest of All Time) Defensive Tackles that have played for the USC Gamecocks.

LeHeup was selected in the tenth round by the Buffalo Bills in the 1973 NFL draft, and signed with the Bills in April 1973. He was cut by the Bills in August 1973, and ended up playing the 1973 season as a defensive end for the Montreal Alouettes and as an offensive guard for the Toronto Argonauts. He appeared in two CFL games.

In 1974, he joined the World Football League, playing for the Memphis Southmen during the 1974 and 1975 seasons. He appeared in 11 games for Memphis in 1975. John was later selected First Team All-Pro for WFL 1975.

After the WFL folded in 1975, LeHeup returned to the Canadian Football League, playing for the Hamilton Tiger Cats in 1976.

After retiring from football, He attended Gordon Conwell Theological Seminary with a Master of Divinity Degree in 1980, In 1986 he received a Doctor of Ministry Degree from Columbia Theological Seminary in Decatur, GA. He served pastorates at First Presbyterian Church in Frostproof, Fla; Little Mountain Presbyterian Church, Abbeville SC, Central Presbyterian Church, Anderson SC. Beginning in 2001 John served as the stated Supply Pastor for the Carmel Presbyterian Church for 22 years.

Dr. LeHeup is dually licensed by the state of South Carolina a Community Residential Care Facility Administrator (CRCFA) and as a Nursing Home Administrator (NHA). He was a Retirement Community Administrator for twenty years and has served on the Board of the South Carolina Association of Non-Profit Homes for the Aging (SCANPHA). He worked as the Executive Director of Clemson area Retirement Center from April 2008 until his retirement in 2020.

John was a major contributor to the research used in the revised edition, South Carolina Silversmiths, 1690-1860, edited by Warren Ripley in 1991 and also Hidden Treasures; Re Assessing South Carolina Silversmiths and Related Artisans to 1861, edited by Catherine B. Hollan 2021. He is the past President of the South Carolina Silver Society and a Member of the American Silver Guild in the Washington, DC area. He has given lectures on the subject of South Carolina silver to many groups including the New York University Summer Symposium in 2003 and 2004. In the March 2007 edition of Traditional Homes he and his wife, Vickie were featured along with an article about his South Carolina silver collection.

John is married to Vickie Buchanan LeHeup and lives in Belton, South Carolina. They have four children and three grandchildren.
