= Billy Pritchett =

American football player (born 1951)

No. 39
- Position: Running back

Personal information
- Born: February 22, 1951; Mart, Texas, U.S.
- Died: March 5, 2021 (aged 70); Richardson, Texas, U.S.
- Listed height: 6 ft 3 in (1.91 m)
- Listed weight: 230 lb (104 kg)

Career information
- High school: Van Vleck (TX)
- College: West Texas A&M
- NFL draft: 1974: 6th round, 146th overall pick

Career history
- Cleveland Browns (1975); Atlanta Falcons (1976–1977)

Career NFL statistics
- Rushing attempts: 92
- Rushing yards: 280
- Rushing TDs: 1
- Stats at Pro Football Reference

Billy Pritchett (February 22, 1951 – March 5, 2021) was an American professional football running back. He played for the Cleveland Browns in 1975 and for the Atlanta Falcons from 1976 to 1977.

Pritchett played college football for three seasons at West Texas State University, amassing 1,893 rushing yards and nine touchdowns. He had his best season as a sophomore in 1971, surpassing the 1,000-yard mark with 1,128 rushing yards and seven touchdowns.

The Cleveland Browns picked Pritchett in the sixth round of the 1974 NFL Draft. He played one season in Cleveland and two for the Atlanta Falcons. Over the course of his career Pritchett ran 280 yards and scored one rushing touchdown.

Following his football career, Pritchett worked as in the transportation industry as a freight specialist for Central Freight & Roadrunner Dawes.

Pritchett died on March 5, 2021.
