= Bud Magrum =

American gridiron football player (1949–1991)

Profile
- Position: Defensive end

Personal information
- Born: June 2, 1949; Ohio, U.S.
- Died: November 3, 1991 (aged 42); Reno, Nevada, U.S.
- Listed height: 6 ft 4 in (1.93 m)
- Listed weight: 250 lb (113 kg)

Career history
- 1973–1974: BC Lions

Awards and highlights
- First-team All-American (1972); Third-team All-American (1971); First-team All-Big Eight (1972); Second-team All-Big Eight (1971)

Francis Joseph "Bud" Magrum (July 2, 1949 – November 3, 1991) was an American professional football player who played for the BC Lions. He played college football at the University of Colorado Boulder.

Magrum dropped out of high school after sophomore year to join the United States Marine Corps and fought in the Vietnam War. He was awarded the Purple Heart twice and served as a demolitions expert. After returning from Vietnam, Magrum played for the Quantico Marines football team as a defensive lineman. Following the advice of his coach to earn a college degree, Magrum turned down offers from NFL teams and instead went to Colorado.
