= Greg Marx =

American football player (1950–2018)

No. 78
- Position: Defensive end

Personal information
- Born: July 18, 1950; Detroit, Michigan, U.S.
- Died: October 5, 2018 (aged 68); Northville, Michigan, U.S.
- Listed height: 6 ft 4 in (1.93 m)
- Listed weight: 260 lb (118 kg)

Career information
- High school: Detroit Catholic Central (Novi, Michigan)
- College: Notre Dame
- NFL draft: 1973: 2nd round, 39th overall pick

Career history
- Atlanta Falcons (1973)

Awards and highlights
- Unanimous All-American (1972)
- Stats at Pro Football Reference

Gregory Allen Marx (July 18, 1950 – October 5, 2018) was an American professional football defensive end who played one season with the Atlanta Falcons of the National Football League (NFL). He was selected by the Falcons in the second round of the 1973 NFL draft after playing college football at the University of Notre Dame.

== Early life ==
Marx played high school football at Detroit Catholic Central High School, earning 1st Team All-City, All-State and All-American honors. He was named the state's Defensive Player of the Year by the Detroit News. He also participated in basketball, helping the 1968 team to the Catholic League and City Championships. Marx also earned All-City and All-State recognition in 1968. He was inducted into the Detroit Catholic Central High School Athletic Hall of Fame in 2008.

== College career ==
Marx played for the Notre Dame Fighting Irish from 1970 to 1972. He was a consensus All-American and co-captain of the Fighting Irish football team in 1972. He recorded career totals of 263 tackles and six pass breakups. Marx played in the College All-Star game and Hula Bowl in 1973. He was also a two-time CoSIDA Academic All-American. He earned post-graduate scholarships from the NCAA and National Football Foundation.

== Professional career ==
Marx was selected by the Atlanta Falcons with the 39th pick in the 1973 NFL draft. He played in fourteen games for the Falcons during the 1973 season.

== Personal life ==
Marx earned a Juris Doctor degree from Notre Dame Law School in 1977 and subsequently worked in the banking and securities industries. Marx died on October 5, 2018, at the age of 68.
