= Mike Seifert =

American football player (born 1951)

No. 66
- Position: Defensive end

Personal information
- Born: March 30, 1951 (age 75); Port Washington, Wisconsin, U.S.
- Listed height: 6 ft 3 in (1.91 m)
- Listed weight: 245 lb (111 kg)

Career information
- High school: Kiel
- College: Wisconsin
- NFL draft: 1974: 13th round, 327th overall pick

Career history
- Cleveland Browns (1974)

Career NFL statistics
- Sacks: 3
- Fumble recoveries: 1
- Stats at Pro Football Reference

Mike Seifert (born March 30, 1951) is a former player in the National Football League (NFL) for the Cleveland Browns in 1974 as a defensive end. Seifert was drafted in the 13th round of the 1974 NFL draft by the Browns. He played at the collegiate level at the University of Wisconsin–Madison.

== Biography ==
Seifert was born Michael Patrick Seifert on March 31, 1951, in Port Washington, Wisconsin. Elementary ..., Valders High School 196X - 196X Kiel High School 196X - 1970
