= Ed Newman =

American football player and judge (born 1951)

No. 64
- Position: Guard

Personal information
- Born: June 4, 1951 (age 75); Woodbury, New York, U.S.
- Listed height: 6 ft 2 in (1.88 m)
- Listed weight: 245 lb (111 kg)

Career information
- High school: Syosset (Syosset, New York)
- College: Duke
- NFL draft: 1973: 6th round, 156th overall pick

Career history
- Miami Dolphins (1973–1984)

Awards and highlights
- Super Bowl champion (VIII); First-team All-Pro (1984); 3× Second-team All-Pro (1981–1983); 4× Pro Bowl (1981–1984); Dolphins Walk of Fame (2014); 2× First-team All-ACC (1971, 1972)

Career NFL statistics
- Games Played: 167
- Games Started: 113
- Stats at Pro Football Reference

Edward Kenneth Newman (born June 4, 1951) is an American former professional football player who was an offensive guard for the Miami Dolphins of the National Football League (NFL) from 1973 to 1984. A four-time Pro Bowl selection, he played 167 games over 12 seasons with the Dolphins. He is now a judge in Florida, and he has recently published his memoir, Warrior Judge: One Man's Journey from Gridiron to Gavel.

== Early life ==
Newman was born in Brooklyn, New York, grew up in Syosset, New York, and Woodbury, New York, and is Jewish. Once, when asked how he got up for a goal-line stand, he responded with a Yiddish word to describe the process, saying: "You gotta suck it up from the kishkes." He played high school football and wrestled for Syosset High School in the late 1960s.

== College career in football and wrestling ==
He enrolled in 1969 at Duke University on an athletic scholarship. He participated for Duke in two sports: twice earning All Conference honors in football as an offensive lineman and defensive lineman, and twice as a heavyweight wrestler winning the ACC heavyweight championship. He was a Football All-American in 1971, and a Football All-ACC in 1971 and 1972. In 1973, Newman graduated from Duke University with a Bachelor of Science degree in psychology.

== Football career ==
The Miami Dolphins drafted Newman in the sixth round of the 1973 NFL draft.

In his football career, the Dolphins went to three Super Bowls: Minnesota Vikings (1973 win), Washington Redskins (1982 loss), and San Francisco 49ers (1984 loss); and Newman was a three-time All Pro and was selected by his peers to the Pro Bowl four times (1981, 1982, 1983, and 1984). He did not play the 1985 season with his third serious knee injury, after having overcome thyroid cancer earlier in his career. A knee injury in his 13th season with the Dolphins in 1985 ended his career.

During his pro career, he worked as an assistant coach of the Florida International University wrestling team in the off-season.

During his NFL career, Newman spearheaded a community drive for blood donations on behalf of the South Florida Blood Service. This and other charitable efforts resulted in the renaming of Northwest 17th Street (Miami, Florida) to "Ed Newman Street."

=== Honors ===
Newman was inducted into the Duke Athletic Hall of Fame, the National Jewish Sports Hall of Fame, and the International Jewish Sports Hall of Fame in the Wingate Institute, outside of Netanya, in Israel. He was also inducted, alongside a host of other former Miami Dolphins players, into the St. Thomas University (FL) Sports Hall of Fame in 2015. He was inducted into the Dolphins Walk of Fame in 2014.

== Law career ==
In 1984, while playing pro football by day, Newman enrolled in the night division of the University of Miami School of Law. After graduating in 1987, Newman practiced law as a litigation attorney for seven years. In 1994, Newman was elected County Court Judge in Miami, Florida, and began his first term in January 1995. He retired in 2022, after serving for decades at the Richard E. Gerstein Criminal Justice Building alongside his bailiff and former Dolphins teammate Tony Nathan.

== Personal life ==
Newman married his wife Cathy in 1977.

Newman serves on the Miami Dolphins Alumni Board of Directors, the University of Miami School of Law alumni board, and the Board of Transition, Inc.

== See also ==
- List of select Jewish football players
