= Settegast =

A Settegast is a standard medical x-ray projection that presents a tangential view of the patella.

To acquire such an image the patient is placed in a prone position with the knee flexed at least 90 degrees and the field of view centered on the patellofemoral joint space.
