= Dave Sullivan (American football) =

American football player (born 1951)

No. 48
- Position: Wide receiver

Personal information
- Born: January 31, 1951 (age 75); Steelton, Pennsylvania, U.S.
- Listed height: 5 ft 11 in (1.80 m)
- Listed weight: 185 lb (84 kg)

Career information
- High school: Steelton-Highspire
- College: Virginia
- NFL draft: 1973: 15th round, 384th overall pick

Career history
- Cleveland Browns (1973–1974)

Awards and highlights
- First-team All-ACC (1972)
- Stats at Pro Football Reference

David Allan Sullivan (born January 1, 1951) is an American former professional football player who was a wide receiver for the Cleveland Browns of the National Football League (NFL). He played college football for the Virginia Cavaliers. He was taken in the 15th round of the 1973 NFL draft. Sullivan played two seasons in Cleveland and had five catches for 92 yards in 1974. In his finest game with the Browns, he caught two passes for 52 yards from Brian Sipe in a 26–16 loss to the Steelers. Sullivan was being defended by Hall of Fame cornerback Mel Blount in that game at Cleveland Stadium in 1974.

Sullivan started three years for UVA despite being considered “undersized” coming out of high school. He was an AP honorable mention All-American and first-team Atlantic Coast Conference wide receiver his senior year at the University of Virginia when he had 51 catches for 662 yards and seven touchdowns. In his UVA career, Sullivan amassed 120 catches for 1,568 yards and 12 touchdowns, the first two setting Virginia records. He participated in the Blue-Gray Classic and senior Bowl All-Star Game after his senior year. He retired from the NFL after his third knee surgery.

After retiring from football, Sullivan found his niche in the funeral and cemetery business. He joined Gibraltar Mausoleum Corp. in Indianapolis in 1977 and rose to become the executive vice president of sales and marketing. He stayed with that company for 18 years. Sullivan has 47 years in the sales and marketing end of the business and formed Saber Management in January 1998.

He was named the 2002 Ernst & Young Heartland, Indiana, Entrepreneur of the Year and led Saber Management to even bigger successes over the next 15 years before selling to Park Lawn Corp. in 2017 for $65 million.

Sullivan is also recognized for his philanthropy. He and his wife, Sara, have been a consistent and generous donor to the nonprofit Amy For Africa, a Christian organization serving Uganda, since 2014. He has also been involved in many other charities promoting needs for children and others in need through both his business contributions and personal ones.
