= Preston Anderson =

American football player (1951–1980)

No. 40
- Position: Cornerback

Personal information
- Born: September 30, 1951; Bonham, Texas, U.S.
- Died: October 15, 1980 (aged 29); The Woodlands, Texas, U.S.
- Listed height: 6 ft 1 in (1.85 m)
- Listed weight: 183 lb (83 kg)

Career information
- High school: Bonham (TX)
- College: Rice
- NFL draft: 1974: 16th round, 407th overall pick

Career history
- Cleveland Browns (1974)

Awards and highlights
- Second-team All-SWC (1973)

Career NFL statistics
- Games played: 14
- Fumbles recovered: 1
- Stats at Pro Football Reference

Jerry Preston Anderson (September 30, 1951 – October 15, 1980) was an American professional football cornerback who played one season for the Cleveland Browns in 1974. He was selected in the 16th round (407th overall) in the 1974 NFL draft. He was also selected in the 27th round (314) in the 1974 WFL Draft.
