= Merv Krakau =

American football player (born 1951)

No. 52
- Position: Linebacker

Personal information
- Born: May 16, 1951 (age 75); Jefferson, Iowa, U.S.
- Listed height: 6 ft 2 in (1.88 m)
- Listed weight: 242 lb (110 kg)

Career information
- College: Iowa State
- NFL draft: 1973: 14th round, 344th overall pick

Career history
- Buffalo Bills (1973–1978); New England Patriots (1978); Tampa Bay Bandits (1983)

Awards and highlights
- Third-team All-American (1972); First-team All-Big Eight (1972); Iowa State Athletics Hall of Fame (2007)

Career NFL statistics
- Games played - started: 72-54
- Interceptions: 3
- Fumble recoveries: 9
- Stats at Pro Football Reference

Mervin Floyd Krakau (pronounced KROH-ker) (born May 16, 1951) is an American former professional football player who was a linebacker for six seasons with the Buffalo Bills and the New England Patriots of the National Football League (NFL). After a five-year hiatus, he played a seventh professional season with the Tampa Bay Bandits of the United States Football League (USFL). He played college football for the Iowa State Cyclones.

Krakau was a four-sport star at Guthrie Center High School. His versatility in track and field attracted the attention of Jimmy Johnson, then an assistant to Johnny Majors at Iowa State University. Krakau accepted Iowa State's scholarship offer in the spring of 1969. He played defensive end for the Cyclones, helping Iowa State reach its first two bowl games, the 1971 Sun Bowl and the 1972 Liberty Bowl. Krakau's best game of his 1972 senior campaign came in the regular season finale against Nebraska. Krakau made 11 tackles, sacked the quarterback twice, and caused and recovered two fumbles as the Cyclones ended Nebraska's 24-game Big Eight winning streak with a 23–23 tie. Krakau was named Big Eight Player of the Week and Sports Illustrated's national Lineman of the Week for his outstanding play. For the season, he was named first-team All-Big Eight and third-team All-American. Krakau is the first defensive player from Iowa State to be named All-American.

Krakau played six seasons in the NFL, from 1973 to 1978. His best season in Buffalo was 1976, when he started all 14 games at middle linebacker, led the team in tackles with 132, and was second in the NFL in fumble recoveries, with six. In 1983, he played for the Tampa Bay Bandits of the USFL.

Krakau is a member of the Iowa High School Athletic Association Football Hall of Fame. In 2007, he was inducted into the Iowa State University Athletics Hall of fame.
