= Paul Seymour (American football) =

American football player (born 1950)

No. 87
- Position: Tight end

Personal information
- Born: February 6, 1950 (age 76); Detroit, Michigan, U.S.
- Listed height: 6 ft 5 in (1.96 m)
- Listed weight: 252 lb (114 kg)

Career information
- High school: Shrine Catholic (Royal Oak, Michigan)
- College: Michigan
- NFL draft: 1973: 1st round, 7th overall pick

Career history
- Buffalo Bills (1973–1977)

Awards and highlights
- Consensus All-American (1972); First-team All-Big Ten (1972); Second-team All-Big Ten (1971)

Career NFL statistics
- Receptions: 62
- Receiving yards: 818
- Receiving touchdowns: 3
- Stats at Pro Football Reference

Paul Christopher Seymour (born February 6, 1950) is an American former professional football player who was a tight end for the Buffalo Bills of the National Football League (NFL). He played college football for the Michigan Wolverines from 1969 to 1972 and was selected as a consensus first-team offensive tackle on the 1972 College Football All-America Team. He later played professionally as a tight end for the Bills from 1973 to 1978, catching 62 passes for 818 yards.

== Early life ==
Seymour was born in Detroit, Michigan, in 1950. He grew up in Berkley, Michigan, and attended Shrine Catholic High School in Royal Oak, Michigan. His older brother, Jim Seymour, also attended Shrine High School and went on to become a standout wide receiver at the University of Notre Dame. Both Seymour brothers were inducted into the Shrine High School Hall of Fame in 2009, along with their brother, John, who played running back at West Point.

== University of Michigan ==
Seymour enrolled at the University of Michigan in 1968 and played for coach Bo Schembechler's Michigan Wolverines football teams from 1969 to 1972. He played as a split end in 1969 and a tight end from 1970 to 1971. In his two seasons as a tight end, Seymour caught 19 passes for 257 yards and one touchdown.

At 6'5", 250 lbs., he was converted to an offensive tackle in 1972. At the end of the 1972 season, Seymour was selected as a consensus first-team offensive tackle on the 1972 College Football All-America Team. He received first-team honors from the Newspaper Enterprise Association, the Football Writers Association of America, the American Football Coaches Association, the Sporting News and Time magazine.

== Professional football ==
Seymour was selected by the Buffalo Bills in the first round (seventh overall) of the 1973 NFL draft. He was selected primarily as an offensive lineman to block for O. J. Simpson, but he was converted back to the tight end position. As a rookie, he started all 14 games as a tight end for the Bills and caught 10 passes for 114 yards. Seymour ultimately played five seasons for the Bills from 1973 to 1977, appearing in 69 games, 68 of them as the team's starting tight end. His best game as an NFL player came against the undefeated New England Patriots on October 20, 1974. In that game, Seymour caught three passes for 64 yards and two touchdowns to lead the Bills to an upset victory over the Patriots. In five seasons with the Bills, Seymour caught 62 passes for 818 yards.

In August 1978, the Bills traded Seymour to the Pittsburgh Steelers in exchange for wide receiver Frank Lewis. However, Seymour failed to pass the Steelers' physical when they discovered that he had undergone surgery on his arches. Seymour was returned to the Bills, but he never played another NFL game.

== Later life ==
Seymour currently resides in Okemos, Michigan.
