= 1972 All-America college football team =

Official list of the best college football players of 1972

The 1972 All-America college football team is composed of college football players who were selected as All-Americans by various organizations and writers that chose College Football All-America Teams in 1972. The National Collegiate Athletic Association (NCAA) recognizes six selectors as "official" for the 1972 season. They are: (1) the American Football Coaches Association (AFCA) which selected its team for Kodak based on a vote of the nation's coaches; (2) the Associated Press (AP) selected based on the votes of sports writers at AP newspapers; (3) the Football Writers Association of America (FWAA) selected by the nation's football writers; (4) the Newspaper Enterprise Association (NEA) selected based on the votes of sports writers at NEA newspapers; (5) the United Press International (UPI) selected based on the votes of sports writers at UPI newspapers; and (6) the Walter Camp Football Foundation (WC).

Eight players are recognized by the NCAA as unanimous All-America selections. They are: (1) wide receiver and 1972 Heisman Trophy winner Johnny Rodgers of Nebraska; (2) tight end Charles Young of USC; (3) offensive tackle Jerry Sisemore of Texas; (4) offensive guard John Hannah of Alabama; (5) running back Greg Pruitt of Oklahoma; (6) defensive tackle Greg Marx of Notre Dame; (7) middle guard Rich Glover of Nebraska; and (8) defensive back Brad Van Pelt of Michigan State.

== Consensus All-Americans ==
The following chart identifies the NCAA-recognized consensus All-Americans for the year 1972 and displays which first-team designations they received.

Name	Position	School	Number	Official	Other
Rich Glover	Middle guard	Nebraska	6/3/9	AFCA, AP, FWAA, NEA, UPI, WC	FN, Time, TSN
John Hannah	Offensive guard	Alabama	6/3/9	AFCA, AP, FWAA, NEA, UPI, WC	FN, Time, TSN
Greg Marx	Defensive tackle	Notre Dame	6/3/9	AFCA, AP, FWAA, NEA, UPI, WC	FN, Time, TSN
Johnny Rodgers	Wide receiver	Nebraska	6/3/9	AFCA, AP, FWAA, NEA, UPI, WC	FN, Time, TSN
Jerry Sisemore	Offensive tackle	Texas	6/3/9	AFCA, AP, FWAA, NEA, UPI, WC	FN, Time, TSN
Charle Young	Tight end	USC	6/3/9	AFCA, AP, FWAA, NEA, UPI, WC	FN, Time, TSN
Greg Pruitt	Running back	Oklahoma	6/2/8	AFCA, AP, FWAA, NEA, UPI, WC	FN, TSN
Brad Van Pelt	Defensive back	Michigan State	6/2/8	AFCA, AP, FWAA, NEA, UPI, WC	Time, TSN
Tom Brahaney	Center	Oklahoma	5/3/8	AP, FWAA, NEA, UPI, WC	FN, Time, TSN
Willie Harper	Defensive end	Nebraska	5/2/7	AFCA, AP, NEA, UPI, WC	FN, TSN
Dave Butz	Defensive tackle	Purdue	4/2/6	AFCA, NEA, UPI, WC	Time, TSN
Bert Jones	Quarterback	LSU	3/3/6	AFCA, NEA, UPI	FN, Time, TSN
Otis Armstrong	Running back	Purdue	4/1/5	AP, FWAA, UPI, WC	TSN
Bruce Bannon	Defensive end	Penn State	4/1/5	AFCA, NEA, UPI, WC	FN
Randy Gradishar	Linebacker	Ohio State	4/1/5	AFCA, AP, FWAA, UPI	FN
Cullen Bryant	Defensive back	Colorado	3/2/5	AFCA, NEA, UPI	Time, TSN
Paul Seymour	Offensive tackle	Michigan	3/2/5	AFCA, FWAA, NEA	Time, TSN
Ron Rusnak	Offensive guard	North Carolina	4/0/4	AFCA, AP, FWAA, UPI	--
Randy Logan	Defensive back	Michigan	3/1/4	AFCA, UPI, WC	FN
Woody Green	Running back	Arizona State	3/0/3	AP, NEA, UPI	--
Robert Popelka	Defensive back	SMU	3/0/3	AP, FWAA, WC	--
John Skorupan	Linebacker	Penn State	3/0/3	AP, FWAA, NEA	--

== Offense ==
=== Receivers ===
- Johnny Rodgers, Nebraska (AFCA [flanker], AP-1, FWAA, NEA-1, UPI-1, WC, FN, Time TSN)
- Steve Holden, Arizona State (FWAA, NEA-2, TSN, Time, FN)
- Barry Smith, Florida State (AFCA [off. end], AP-2, UPI-2)
- Jason Caldwell, North Carolina Central (NEA-2)
- Mike Creaney, Notre Dame (AP-3 [TE])

=== Tight ends ===
- Charle Young, USC (AFCA [off. end], AP-1, FWAA, NEA-1, UPI-1, WC, FN, Time, TSN)
- Billy Joe DuPree, Michigan State (NEA-2)
- Al Chandler, Oklahoma (UPI-2)
- Gary Butler, Rice (AP-2)
- Steve Sweeney, California (AP-3)
- Daryl White, Nebraska (AP-3 [OT], NEA-1 [OG])

=== Tackles ===
- Jerry Sisemore, Texas (AFCA, AP-1, FWAA, NEA-1, UPI-1, WC, TSN, Time, FN)
- Paul Seymour, Michigan (AFCA, AP-2, FWAA, NEA-1, UPI-2, Time, TSN)
- John Hicks, Ohio State (AP-1, UPI-2, WC, NEA-1 [OG])
- Pete Adams, USC (AP-2, NEA-2, UPI-1, Time)
- John Dampeer, Notre Dame (FN)
- Curtis Wester, East Texas State (NEA-2)
- Bruce Walton, UCLA (AP-3)

=== Guards ===
- John Hannah, Alabama (AFCA, AP-1, FWAA, NEA-1, UPI-1, WC, FN, Time, TSN)
- Ron Rusnak, North Carolina (AFCA, AP-1, FWAA, UPI-1)
- Skip Singletary, Temple (AP-2, NEA-2, UPI-2, WC)
- Joe DeLamielleure, Michigan State (AP-2, TSN)
- Geary Murdock, Iowa State (FN)
- Ken Jones, Oklahoma (AP-3, UPI-2)
- Larry Ulmer, Western Michigan (AP-3)

=== Centers ===
- Tom Brahaney, Oklahoma (AP-1, UPI-1, NEA-1, WC, FWAA, TSN, Time, FN)
- Jim Krapf, Alabama (AFCA, UPI-2)
- Doug Dumler, Nebraska (NEA-2)
- Orderia Mitchell, Air Force (AP-2)
- Gerald Schultze, West Virginia (AP-3)

=== Quarterbacks ===
- Bert Jones, LSU (AFCA, NEA-1, UPI-1, FN, Time, TSN)
- John Hufnagel, Penn State (AP-1, WC)
- Gary Huff, Florida State (FWAA, NEA-2, UPI-2)
- Tony Adams, Utah State (AP-2)
- Don Strock, Virginia Tech (AP-3)

=== Running backs ===
- Greg Pruitt, Oklahoma (AFCA [HB], AP-1, FWAA, NEA-1 [WR], UPI-1, WC, FN, TSN)
- Otis Armstrong, Purdue (AP-1, FWAA, UPI-1, WC, TSN)
- Woody Green, Arizona State (AP-1, NEA-1, UPI-1)
- Dick Jauron, Yale (AFCA [HB], AP-2, WC)
- Sam Cunningham, USC (AFCA [FB], NEA-1)
- George Amundson, Iowa State (NEA-2)
- Howard Stevens, Louisville (AP-2, NEA-2, UPI-2)
- Roosevelt Leaks, Texas (AP-2)
- Charlie Davis, Colorado (UPI-2)
- Anthony Davis, USC (UPI-2)
- Bob Hitchens, Miami (OH) (AP-3)
- Steve Jones, Duke (AP-3)
- Pete Van Valkenburg, BYU (AP-3)

== Defense ==
=== Defensive ends ===
- Willie Harper, Nebraska (AFCA [LB], AP-1, NEA-1, UPI-1, WC, FN, TSN)
- Bruce Bannon, Penn State (AFCA, AP-2, NEA-1, UPI-1, WC, FN)
- Wally Chambers, Eastern Kentucky (NEA-2, TSN, Time)
- John Matuszak, Tampa (AP-3 [DT], NEA-2 [DT], TSN, Time)
- Ernie Price, Texas A&I (NEA-2)
- Tab Bennett, Illinois (UPI-2)
- Danny Sanspree, Auburn (AP-2)
- Steve Bogosian, Army (AP-3)
- Merv Krakau, Iowa State (AP-3)

=== Defensive tackles ===
- Greg Marx, Notre Dame (AFCA [DE], AP-1, FWAA, NEA-1, UPI-1, WC, FN, Time, TSN)
- Dave Butz, Purdue (UPI-1, NEA-1, WC, AFCA, TSN, Time)
- Roger Goree, Baylor (AP-1 [DE], FWAA, UPI-2 [DE])
- John Grant, Southern California (AP-2, FWAA)
- Derland Moore, Oklahoma (AP-1, UPI-2)
- John LeHeup, South Carolina (AFCA)
- Bud Magrum, Colorado (FWAA, UPI-2 [LB])
- George Hasenohrl, Ohio State (AP-2, UPI-2, FN)
- Bob Leyen, Yale (NEA-2)
- Charlie Davis, Texas Christian (AP-3)

=== Middle guards ===
- Rich Glover, Nebraska (AFCA, AP-1, FWAA, NEA-1, UPI-1, WC, FN, Time TSN)
- Don Rives, Texas Tech (AP-2)
- Lucious Selmon, Oklahoma (UPI-2)
- Tony Cristiani, Miami (FL) (AP-3)

=== Linebackers ===
- Randy Gradishar, Ohio State (AFCA, AP-1, FWAA, UPI-1, FN)
- John Skorupan, Penn State (AP-1, FWAA, NEA-1)
- Steve Brown, Oregon State (AP-3, NEA-1, WC, Time, TSN)
- Jamie Rotella, Tennessee (AFCA, AP-2, UPI-1, FN)
- Rich Wood, USC (AP-1, NEA-2 [MG], UPI-2, FN)
- Jim Youngblood, Tennessee Tech (NEA-1, Time)
- Tom Jackson, Louisville (AP-2, WC)
- Warren Capone, LSU (FWAA)
- John Mitchell, Alabama (AFCA)
- Jackie Wallace, Arizona (NEA-2, UPI-2)
- Matt Blair, Iowa State (NEA-2)
- Glen Gaspard, Texas (AP-2)
- Jim Merlo, Stanford (AP-3)
- Eddie Sheats, Kansas (AP-3)

=== Defensive backs ===
- Brad Van Pelt, Michigan State (AFCA, AP-1, FWAA, NEA-1, UPI-1, WC, Time, TSN)
- Cullen Bryant, Colorado (AFCA, AP-3, NEA-1, UPI-1, Time, TSN)
- Randy Logan, Michigan (AFCA, AP-2, NEA-2, UPI-1, WC, FN)
- Robert Popelka, Southern Methodist (AP-1, FWAA, UPI-2, WC)
- Burgess Owens, Miami (NEA-2, TSN, Time)
- Jackie Wallace, Arizona (AP-3, Time, TSN)
- Conrad Graham, Tennessee (UPI-1, FN, NEA-2)
- Randy Rhino, Georgia Tech (AP-2, FWAA)
- Calvin Jones, Washington (AP-1, UPI-2)
- Drane Scrivener, Tulsa (NEA-1)
- Ray Guy, Southern Miss (WC)
- Frank Dowsing, Mississippi State (FN)
- Joe Blahak, Nebraska (AP-2, UPI-2)
- J. T. Thomas, Florida State (NEA-2)
- John Provost, Holy Cross (AP-3)

== Special teams ==
=== Kickers ===
- Ricky Townsend, Tennessee (FWAA)
- Chris Gartner, Indiana (TSN)

=== Punters ===
- Ray Guy, Southern Miss (FWAA, TSN, Time)

== Key ==
- **Bold** – Consensus All-American
- -1 – First-team selection
- -2 – Second-team selection
- -3 – Third-team selection

=== Official selectors ===
- AFCA – American Football Coaches Association for Kodak
- AP – Associated Press
- FWAA – Football Writers Association of America
- NEA – Newspaper Enterprise Association
- UPI – United Press International
- WC = Walter Camp Football Foundation

=== Other selectors ===
- FN – Football News
- PFW – Pro Football Weekly
- Time – Time magazine
- TSN – The Sporting News

== See also ==
- 1972 All-Big Eight Conference football team
- 1972 All-Big Ten Conference football team
- 1972 All-Pacific-8 Conference football team
- 1972 All-SEC football team
- 1972 All-Southwest Conference football team
