= Mark Ilgenfritz =

American football player (born 1952)

No. 77
- Position: Defensive end

Personal information
- Born: August 9, 1952 (age 74); Honolulu, Hawaii, U.S.
- Listed height: 6 ft 4 in (1.93 m)
- Listed weight: 250 lb (113 kg)

Career information
- High school: Sandy Springs (GA)
- College: Vanderbilt
- NFL draft: 1974: 5th round, 118th overall pick

Career history
- Cleveland Browns (1974)
- Stats at Pro Football Reference

Mark Ilgenfritz (born August 9, 1952) is an American former professional football player who was a defensive end for the Cleveland Browns of the National Football League (NFL) in 1974. He played college football for the Vanderbilt Commodores.
