= Chris Gartner =

Swedish gridiron football player (born 1950)

No. 10
- Position: Placekicker

Personal information
- Born: July 12, 1950 (age 76); Gothenburg, Sweden
- Listed height: 6 ft 0 in (1.83 m)
- Listed weight: 170 lb (77 kg)

Career information
- High school: Princeton (NJ)
- College: Indiana
- NFL draft: 1973: undrafted

Career history
- Dallas Cowboys (1973)*; Cleveland Browns (1974)
- * Offseason or practice squad member only

Career NFL statistics
- Games played: 11
- Stats at Pro Football Reference

Sven Chris Gartner (born July 12, 1950) is a Swedish former American football kicker who played one season for the Cleveland Browns of the National Football League (NFL). He played college football at Indiana University.

== Early life and education ==
Chris Gartner was born on July 12, 1950, in Gothenburg, Sweden. He is one of only 9 Swedish NFL players. He went to high school in Princeton, New Jersey, and attended college at Indiana. Gartner played for their football team, the Hoosiers, and was inducted into the school's Hall of Fame in 2019. In 1972 (his senior year), he was selected to first-team All-America and first-team All-Big Ten after setting school records for single-season scores (14), field goals in a game (4), and longest field goal (52 yards). In a 35–34 win against Kentucky, he became the only IU player to have two 50+ yard field goals in a single game.

== Professional career ==
After going unselected in the 1973 NFL draft, Gartner was signed as an undrafted free agent by the Dallas Cowboys, but was released in July.

In 1974, Gartner was signed by the Cleveland Browns as a second kicker to handle kickoff duties, where he played in 11 games. As of 2025, his 11 games stands as the most played by a Swedish player in the Super Bowl era. He was released by the Browns before the start of the 1975 season.
