= 1977 NFL season =

American football season

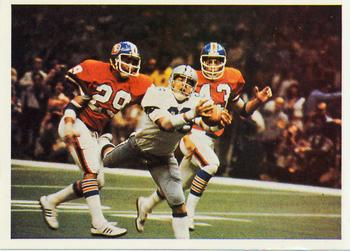
- The Cowboys playing against the Broncos in Super Bowl XII

Regular season
- Duration: September 18 – December 18, 1977

Playoffs
- Start date: December 24, 1977
- AFC Champions: Denver Broncos
- NFC Champions: Dallas Cowboys

Super Bowl XII
- Date: January 15, 1978
- Site: Louisiana Superdome, New Orleans, Louisiana
- Champions: Dallas Cowboys

Pro Bowl
- Date: January 23, 1978
- Site: Tampa Stadium, Tampa, Florida

AFC teams: West, Central, East
NFC teams: West, Central, East

The 1977 NFL season was the 58th regular season of the National Football League. The two second-season expansion franchises switched conferences, with the Seattle Seahawks moving from the NFC West to the AFC West, and the Tampa Bay Buccaneers transferring from the AFC West to the NFC Central.

Instead of a traditional Thanksgiving Day game hosted by the Dallas Cowboys, the league scheduled a Miami Dolphins at St. Louis Cardinals contest. This would be only the second season since 1966 that the Cowboys did not play on that holiday. It marked the last time that the Cowboys did not play on Thanksgiving.

This was the last NFL regular season with 14 games and eight playoff teams. The regular season would be expanded to 16 games in 1978, with the preseason reduced from six games to four and the postseason expanded to ten teams.

The 1977 season is considered the last season of the "Dead Ball Era" of professional football (1970 to 1977). The 17.2 average points scored per team per game was the lowest since 1942, and it was the only post-merger season where no player surpassed 1,000 receiving yards. For 1978, the league made significant changes to allow greater offensive production.

The season ended with Super Bowl XII when the Cowboys defeated the Denver Broncos 27–10.

== Player movement ==
=== Transactions ===
- May 2, 1977: Earl Morrall, the oldest player on the 1972 Miami Dolphins championship roster announced his retirement from professional football.

=== Draft ===
The 1977 NFL draft was held from May 3 to 4, 1977, at New York City's Roosevelt Hotel. With the first pick, the Tampa Bay Buccaneers selected running back Ricky Bell from the University of Southern California.

== New referees ==
Tommy Bell retired after the 1976 season. His line judge, Jerry Markbreit (an NFL rookie in 1976), was named his successor. Bell worked two Super Bowls, III and VII. Markbreit would work four Super Bowls, and is (as of 2025) the only referee to achieve this.

== Major rule changes ==
- The head slap is outlawed. This change is referred to as the "Deacon Jones Rule"; the Los Angeles Rams' defensive end frequently used this technique.
- Any shoe worn by a player with an artificial limb must have a kicking surface that conforms to that of a normal kicking shoe. Informally referred to as the "Tom Dempsey Rule". Dempsey was a record-breaking placekicker whose modified shoe (having a flattened and enlarged toe area) on his deformed kicking foot generated controversy during his career.
- Defenders are only permitted to make contact with receivers once.
- Defenders are not allowed to make contact with an opponent above the shoulders with the palms of their hands, except to ward him off the line.
- Offensive linemen are not allowed to thrust their hands to a defender's neck, face, or head.
- Wide receivers are not allowed to clip defenders.
- This was the first season in which time of possession was recorded.

== Deaths ==
Notable NFL deaths in 1977
Date	Player	Age	Notes
October 17	Cal Hubbard	76	Former offensive and defensive tackle for the New York Giants, Green Bay Packers and Pittsburgh Steelers. Elected to the Hall of Fame in 1963. Also an umpire in the American League from 1936 until 1951, and an AL supervisor from 1952 to 1969.
November 18	Davey O'Brien	60	Played tailback and quarterback for the Philadelphia Eagles from 1939 to 1940. 1938 Heisman Trophy winner. Award for best college quarterback is named for him.

== Division races ==
Tampa Bay and Seattle continued as "swing" teams that did not participate in regular conference play. Every other NFL team played a home-and-away series against the other members in its division, two or three interconference games, and the remainder of their 14-game schedule against other conference teams. Tampa Bay switched to the NFC and played the other 13 members of the conference, while Seattle did the same in the AFC. The teams met in Week Five, with Seattle winning 30–23.

Starting in 1970, and through 2001, except for the strike-shortened 1982 season, there were three divisions (Eastern, Central and Western) in each conference. This was the final season in which the winners of each division, and a fourth "wild card" team based on the best non-division winner, qualified for the playoffs. The tiebreaker rules were changed to start with head-to-head competition, followed by division records, common opponents records, and conference play.

National Football Conference

Week	Eastern		Central		Western		Wild Card	
1	3 teams	1–0	(Chicago, Green Bay)	1–0	Atlanta	1–0	3 teams	1–0
2	Dallas	2–0	4 teams	1–1	Atlanta (Note: other teams with same W–L record)	1–1	8 teams	1–1
3	Dallas	3–0	Minnesota	2–1	Atlanta	2–1	3 teams	2–1
4	Dallas	4–0	Minnesota	3–1	Atlanta	3–1	Washington	3–1
5	Dallas	5–0	Minnesota	4–1	Atlanta	3–2	3 teams	3–2
6	Dallas	6–0	Minnesota	4–2	Atlanta	4–2	Los Angeles	4–2
7	Dallas	7–0	Minnesota	5–2	Atlanta	4–3	St. Louis	4–3
8	Dallas	8–0	Minnesota	5–3	Los Angeles	5–3	St. Louis	5–3
9	Dallas	8–1	Minnesota	6–3	Los Angeles	6–3	St. Louis	6–3
10	Dallas	8–2	Minnesota	6–4	Los Angeles	7–3	St. Louis	7–3
11	Dallas	9–2	Minnesota	7–4	Los Angeles	8–3	St. Louis	7–4
12	Dallas	10–2	Minnesota	8–4	Los Angeles	8–4	St. Louis	7–5
13	Dallas	11–2	Chicago	8–5	Los Angeles	10–3	Washington	8–5
14	Dallas	12–2	Minnesota	9–5	Los Angeles	10–4	Chicago	9–5

American Football Conference

Week	Eastern		Central		Western		Wild Card	
1	(Baltimore, Miami)	1–0	3 teams	1–0	(Denver, Oakland)	1–0	5 teams	1–0
2	(Baltimore, Miami)	2–0	(Cleveland, Houston)	2–0	(Denver, Oakland)	2–0	3 teams	2–0–0
3	(Baltimore, Miami)	3–0	Cleveland	2–1	(Denver, Oakland)	3–0	2 teams	3–0
4	Baltimore	4–0	Houston	3–1	(Denver, Oakland)	4–0	2 teams	4–0
5	Baltimore	5–0	Pittsburgh	3–2	Denver	5–0	Oakland	4–1
6	Baltimore	5–1	Pittsburgh	3–2	Denver	6–0	Oakland	5–1
7	Baltimore	6–1	Cleveland	5–2	Oakland	6–1	Denver	6–1
8	Baltimore	7–1	Cleveland	5–3	Oakland	7–1	Denver	7–1
9	Baltimore	8–1	Pittsburgh	5–4	Oakland	8–1	Denver	8–1
10	Baltimore	9–1	Pittsburgh	6–4	Denver	9–1	Oakland	8–2
11	Baltimore	9–2	Pittsburgh	7–4	Denver	10–1	Oakland	9–2
12	Baltimore	9–3	Pittsburgh	8–4	Denver	11–1	Oakland	9–3
13	Baltimore	9–4	Pittsburgh	8–5	Denver	12–1	Oakland	10–3
14	Baltimore	10–4	Pittsburgh	9–5	Denver	12–2	Oakland	11–3

== Regular season ==
Highlights of the 1977 season included:

- Thanksgiving: Two games were played on Thursday, November 24:
1. The first featured Chicago at Detroit. Chicago would prevail by a 31–14 final margin
2. In the second the Miami Dolphins visited St. Louis to play the Cardinals, defeating them by a 55–14 mark. Dolphins quarterback Bob Griese would throw for six touchdown passes, while the Dolphins would set a franchise record for most points scored in one game with 55 (Note: This would be broken when they scored 70 points against the Denver Broncos on September 24th, 2023.) Of note, the Dolphins would score eight touchdowns and accumulate 34 first downs.

=== Final standings ===
AFC East
	W	L	T	PCT	DIV	CONF	PF	PA	STK
^{(2)} Baltimore Colts	10	4	0	.714	6–2	9–3	295	221	W1
Miami Dolphins	10	4	0	.714	6–2	8–4	313	197	W1
New England Patriots	9	5	0	.643	4–4	7–5	278	217	L1
New York Jets	3	11	0	.214	2–6	2–10	191	300	L2
Buffalo Bills	3	11	0	.214	2–6	2–10	160	313	L1

AFC Central
	W	L	T	PCT	DIV	CONF	PF	PA	STK
^{(3)} Pittsburgh Steelers	9	5	0	.643	4–2	7–5	276	243	W1
Houston Oilers	8	6	0	.571	3–3	6–6	299	230	W2
Cincinnati Bengals	8	6	0	.571	3–3	6–5	238	235	L1
Cleveland Browns	6	8	0	.429	2–4	5–7	269	267	L4

AFC West
	W	L	T	PCT	DIV	CONF	PF	PA	STK
^{(1)} Denver Broncos	12	2	0	.857	6–1	11–1	274	148	L1
^{(4)} Oakland Raiders	11	3	0	.786	5–2	10–2	351	230	W2
San Diego Chargers	7	7	0	.500	3–4	6–6	222	205	L2
Seattle Seahawks	5	9	0	.357	1–3	4–9	282	373	W2
Kansas City Chiefs	2	12	0	.143	1–6	1–11	225	349	L6

NFC East
	W	L	T	PCT	DIV	CONF	PF	PA	STK
^{(1)} Dallas Cowboys	12	2	0	.857	7–1	11–1	345	212	W4
Washington Redskins	9	5	0	.643	4–4	8–4	196	189	W3
St. Louis Cardinals	7	7	0	.500	4–4	7–5	272	287	L4
Philadelphia Eagles	5	9	0	.357	2–6	4–8	220	207	W2
New York Giants	5	9	0	.357	3–5	5–7	181	265	L2

NFC Central
	W	L	T	PCT	DIV	CONF	PF	PA	STK
^{(3)} Minnesota Vikings	9	5	0	.643	6–1	8–4	231	227	W1
^{(4)} Chicago Bears	9	5	0	.643	6–1	8–4	255	253	W6
Detroit Lions	6	8	0	.429	2–5	4–8	183	252	L1
Green Bay Packers	4	10	0	.286	2–5	4–7	134	219	W1
Tampa Bay Buccaneers	2	12	0	.143	0–4	2–11	103	223	W2

NFC West
	W	L	T	PCT	DIV	CONF	PF	PA	STK
^{(2)} Los Angeles Rams	10	4	0	.714	4–2	8–4	302	146	L1
Atlanta Falcons	7	7	0	.500	3–3	7–5	179	129	W1
San Francisco 49ers	5	9	0	.357	3–3	5–7	220	260	L3
New Orleans Saints	3	11	0	.214	2–4	3–9	232	336	L4

=== Tiebreakers ===
- Baltimore finished ahead of Miami in the AFC East based on better conference record (9–3 to Dolphins' 8–4).
- N.Y. Jets finished ahead of Buffalo in the AFC East based on better point-differential in head-to-head competition (1 point).
- Houston finished ahead of Cincinnati in the AFC Central based on better point-differential in head-to-head competition (2 points).
- Minnesota finished ahead of Chicago in the NFC Central based on better point-differential in head-to-head competition (3 points).
- Chicago won the NFC Wild Card over Washington based on better net points in conference games (48 to Redskins' 4).
- Philadelphia finished ahead of N.Y. Giants in the NFC East based on head-to-head sweep (2–0).

== Playoffs ==
Dec 26 – Los Angeles Memorial Coliseum
3	Minnesota	14
Jan 1 – Texas Stadium
2	Los Angeles	7
NFC
3	Minnesota	6
Dec 26 – Texas Stadium
1	Dallas	23
NFC Championship
4	Chicago	7
Jan 15 – Louisiana Superdome
1	Dallas	37
Divisional round
N1	Dallas	27
Dec 24 – Memorial Stadium
A1	Denver	10
Super Bowl XII
4	Oakland	37**
Jan 1 – Mile High Stadium
2*	Baltimore	31
AFC
4	Oakland	17
Dec 24 – Mile High Stadium
1	Denver	20
AFC Championship
3	Pittsburgh	21
1*	Denver	34

* The Denver Broncos (the AFC 1 seed) did not play the Oakland Raiders (the 4 seed) in the Divisional playoff round because both teams were in the same division.
** Indicates double overtime victory

== Awards ==
Most Valuable Player	Walter Payton, running back, Chicago
Coach of the Year	Red Miller, Denver
Offensive Player of the Year	Walter Payton, running back, Chicago
Defensive Player of the Year	Harvey Martin, defensive end, Dallas
Offensive Rookie of the Year	Tony Dorsett, running back, Dallas
Defensive Rookie of the Year	A. J. Duhe, defensive end, Miami
Man of the Year	Walter Payton, running back, Chicago
Comeback Player of the Year	Craig Morton, quarterback, Denver
Super Bowl Most Valuable Player	Randy White, defensive tackle, Dallas and Harvey Martin, defensive end, Dallas

== Coaching changes ==
=== Offseason ===
- Atlanta Falcons: Leeman Bennett was named permanent head coach. Marion Campbell was fired after a 1–4 start to the 1976 season. General manager Pat Peppler served as interim for the rest of that season.
- Buffalo Bills: Jim Ringo was named permanent head coach. He was named interim head coach when Lou Saban resigned after the fifth game of the 1976 season.
- Denver Broncos: John Ralston was replaced by Red Miller.
- Detroit Lions: Tommy Hudspeth began his first full season as head coach. He replaced Rick Forzano, who left after the team lost three of its first four games in 1976.
- New York Giants: John McVay began his first season as head coach. He replaced Bill Arnsparger, who was fired after the team lost its first seven games in 1976.
- New York Jets: Walt Michaels became the Jets' new head coach. Lou Holtz resigned prior to the last game of the 1976 season, and Mike Holovak served as interim for the team's final game.
- San Francisco 49ers: Ken Meyer replaced the fired Monte Clark.

=== In-season ===
- Cleveland Browns: Forrest Gregg was fired before the last game of the season. Defensive coordinator Dick Modzelewski served as interim during the team's final game.
- Kansas City Chiefs: After an 0–5 start, Paul Wiggin was fired. Defensive backs coach Tom Bettis was named interim.

== Uniform changes ==
- The Buffalo Bills changed from gray to blue facemasks.
- The Pittsburgh Steelers changed from gray to black facemasks.
- The Tampa Bay Buccaneers changed the color scheme of the numbers on their white jerseys. In 1976, the numbers were orange with red trim; in 1977, they became red with orange trim to increase visibility.

== Television ==
This was the fourth and final year under the league's broadcast contracts with ABC, CBS, and NBC to televise Monday Night Football, the NFC package, and the AFC package, respectively. All three networks renewed their deals for another four years. Don Meredith returned to ABC after spending three seasons at NBC, while Alex Karras returned to his acting career. John Brodie was promoted to replace Meredith as NBC's lead color commentator, while Merlin Olsen replaced Brodie on the network's #2 team. NBC also renamed its pregame show, referring to it as NFL '77 to start and updating the program's title every new season.
