= AAA California =

Counties covered by the Automobile Club of Southern California (red) and California State Automobile Association (blue)

AAA California may refer to one of the following motor clubs associated with the American Automobile Association (AAA):

- Automobile Club of Southern California
- California State Automobile Association, in Northern California
