= Robert N. Barone =

American economist

Robert N. Barone is the co-founder and partner, economist, and portfolio manager of Universal Value Advisors, an investment advisory firm in Reno, NV. He is a contributor to various investment publications and currently serves on the AAA Finance and Investment Committee. He is most known for serving as chairman and CEO of Comstock Bancorp from 1984–1999, selling the institution in 1999. He founded Adagio Trust Company in 2000, opened Ancora West Advisors in 2006 (now Universal Value Advisors), and served as the director of the Federal Home Loan Bank of San Francisco in 2004. He has held positions as the director of AAA of Northern California, Nevada and Utah, the director of its associated insurance company, an economist for Cleveland Trust Company, and a professor of finance at the University of Nevada.

== Education and experience ==
Robert Barone received his PhD in economics from Georgetown University. He has 30 years of experience in the banking industry, 16 years as a CEO, 9 years as an investment advisor, 5 years as a university professor at the University of Nevada, 9 years as director of the Federal Home Loan Bank of San Francisco, the last as its chair. He has 10 years of experience as the director of the California State Automobile Association (AAA) in San Francisco and was the chairman from 2007-2009. He is also the director of the Allied Mineral Products in Columbus, OH. He is a contributor to Forbes.com, thestreet.com, and minyanville.com.
