= Sidney Municipal Airport =

Sidney Municipal Airport may refer to:

- Sidney Municipal Airport (Nebraska), United States
- Sidney Municipal Airport (New York), United States
- Sidney Municipal Airport (Ohio), United States
- Sidney–Richland Municipal Airport, Montana, United States
- Victoria International Airport in Sidney, British Columbia, Canada

== See also ==
- Sydney Airport (disambiguation)
  - Sydney Airport in Sydney, Australia
