= Marc Mancini =

American speaker, educator and consultant

Marc Mancini is an American travel industry speaker, educator and consultant.

== Education ==
A native of Fall River, Massachusetts, Mancini attended Providence College, where he obtained a B.A. in foreign languages and education. He then went on to obtain an M.A (French), an M.S (Cinema) and a Ph.D. (French/Cinema) from the University of Southern California. Mancini attended USC’s film school alongside classmates such as George Lucas, John Carpenter, Ron Howard, and Robert Zemeckis.

== Film-related activities ==
After obtaining his Ph.D. he taught cinema at USC, Loyola Marymount University (LMU), the University of California, Irvine and West Los Angeles College. He also contributed articles to Premiere, Rolling Stone, American Film and Film Comment. He was especially known for a course he taught for four years at LMU and elsewhere, where movie professionals came to share their films and thoughts with students. Among his better-known guests: Cher, Sean Penn, Stanley Donen, Michael York, Henry Mancini (no relation), Carpenter and Zemeckis.

== Transition from cinema to travel ==
While in college and graduate school, Mancini had paid his tuition in part by working as a tour director, taking groups on multi-day, international tours. In the midst of a California budget crisis, West Los Angeles College (where Mancini had become a full-time professor) decided to cut back its costly cinema program. Mancini moved to teach in the Travel and Tourism program.

Mancini soon went beyond his teaching to become a well-known travel speaker, writer, instructional theorist and consultant. The diverse nature of his studies helped him formulate a fresh perspective on teaching and training: that each era has a medium that dominates information-giving and that this medium shapes the way a person of that time learns best.

== Theories ==
Lectures, Mancini argues, worked fine when colleges first emerged, since people of the time received much of their information aurally. And since professors were often clerics, they structured their lectures as sermons, thus reinforcing the "listen, don't interrupt" nature of teaching and learning.

Mancini also points out that extensive readings worked fine for students in the early 1900s, when newspapers, dense with words, provided the news and books were still the principal medium for acquiring knowledge and for storytelling.

Today, in an era when computers, video games and streaming video dominate, teaching and training must be interactive, visual and structured not unlike a movie or TV show, to capture a learner's attention. A teacher or trainer who relies on lectures and readings to teach, concludes Mancini, is completely out of step with today's learner.

== Applications to training ==
Mancini's theories have been applied most fully in the travel business, where his company has created some of the industry’s highest-profile instructional and certification programs, most especially those for the Cruise Lines International Association (CLIA) and Marriott International. It is estimated that more than 300,000 travel professionals worldwide have benefited from training programs that he has designed or delivered. His client list includes Norwegian Cruise Line, Seabourn Cruise Line, American Automobile Association, Holland America Line, Trafalgar, American Express, Pleasant Holidays, Lufthansa and Silversea Cruises.

== Other achievements ==
Mancini also designed and staged the AAA Travel High School Challenge, a national competition on travel-related geographic knowledge. During its four years of operation, the Challenge attracted over 200,000 teenage contestants at local, state and national levels.

Mancini continues to teach Travel and Cinema at West Los Angeles College as an adjunct professor. He has authored seven books, written and appeared in 34 videos and helped design numerous web-based courses. His book Access: An Introduction to Travel and Tourism received the Distinguished Achievement Award from the Association of Educational Publishers. He was named "Educator of the Year" by the International Society of Travel and Tourism Educators. He served as the principal consultant for the launch of the MBA Program in Cruise Studies at Shanghai Maritime University, where he serves as a Visiting Professor.

== Books ==
- Selling Destinations: Geography for the Travel Professional; 5th Edition (Cengage 2012)
- Connecting with Customers: How to Sell, Service and Market the Travel Product (Prentice Hall 2003)
- Access: Introduction to Travel and Tourism, 2nd edition (Cengage 2013)
- Time Management (McGraw-Hill, 2002)
- Selling Destinations: Geography for the Travel Professional; 5th Canadian edition (Cengage 2013)
- Conducting Tours: A Practical Guide, 3rd edition (Delmar/Thomson 2000)
- Cruising: The CLIA Guide to the Cruise Line Industry (Delmar/Cengage 2011)

== Notes ==
- Wu, Yiyao. "Shanghai offers first cruise program." ChinaDaily, April 7, 2014, reprint August 14, 2018
