= AAA Northern New England =

American regional automobile organization

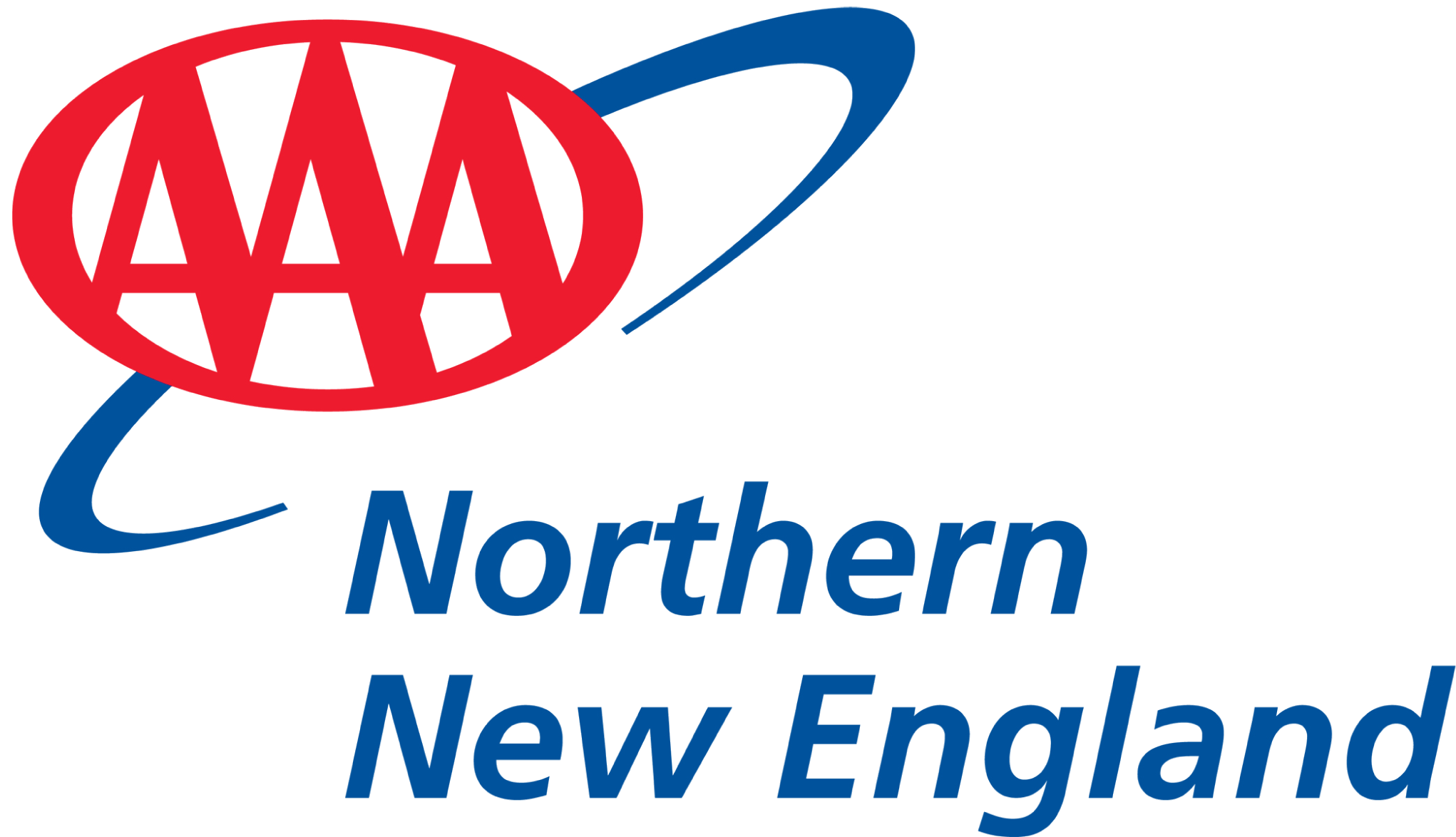
- Headquarters: Portland, Maine
- Region served: Vermont, New Hampshire, and Maine
- Website: northernnewengland.aaa.com

AAA Northern New England (AAANE) is the affiliate of the American Automobile Association which serves the U.S. states of Vermont, New Hampshire, and Maine. It is based in Portland, Maine.

== History ==
AAA Vermont was the Vermont arm of the American Automobile Association and was founded in 1903.

AAA New Hampshire was acquired by AAA Northern New England in 1997.

In 1999 and 2000, AAANE made donations to Vermont Technical College for a scholarship program for automotive technology students. It has also awarded scholarships to automotive technology students at Southern Maine Technical College.

In 2002, it announced an affiliation agreement with the Automobile Club of Southern California.

== Bibliography ==
- Murphy, Edward D. (July 31, 2001). "Innovator Leaves AAA Driver's Seat". Portland Press Herald (Maine).
