= AAA Travel High School Challenge =

Scholarship competition run by the American Automobile Association

The AAA Travel High School Challenge (sometimes shortened to AAA Travel Challenge) was an annual travel-themed scholarship competition run by the American Automobile Association, open to students in grades 9–12 in the fifty United States and the District of Columbia. First run in 2003 as part of AAA's centennial celebrations, the competition became an annual event and a premier high school scholarship program for a time. The competition was notable for its national coverage

The National Finals were held yearly in Orlando, Florida. In its five years of existence, the contest awarded over $600,000 worth of scholarships. The 2007 competition featured a $20,000 top prize (down from $25,000 in past years), won by Samuel Brandt of Oregon. In addition, the 2007 competition, for the first time, also included a separate essay contest for those interested in seeking majors in travel-, tourism-, or hospitality-related careers.

Often compared to the National Geographic Bee, a middle-school competition, the AAA Travel Challenge featured a similar format, with a local, state, and national level, each with progressively tougher questions and material. Unlike the National Geography Bee, however, the AAA Travel Challenge stressed team competition, rather than individual achievement.

The 2007 competition was the last Challenge to take place. Afterwards, administrators opted for a one-year hiatus from the program. Challenge administrators had hoped to use this hiatus to work out and analyze the event "to develop strategies and tactics for an improved program." AAA decided that it would be best to find a single co-sponsor for the event, rather than the multiple sponsors who had supported the competition in previous years. Unfortunately, the recession and other factors made this difficult. On September 26, 2008, it was announced that the Challenge would be discontinued.

== Eligibility ==
Students were eligible to participate in the AAA Travel High School Challenge if they met the following requirements:

- Must be a legal US resident residing in a US state or the District of Columbia. If a student studies abroad but has their legal residence in the US, that student may participate, but must pay for their own travel expenses to US testing locations if they advance in the competition.
- Must be in grade 9, 10, 11, or 12.
- Must be at least 13 years old.
- Must be enrolled in an accredited public or private junior or senior high school, and/or a certified home school program (the school itself does not have to register).
- Must have parental consent, if under 18 years of age.
- Must not have (for the 2007 Competition) individually placed first, second, or third in previous National AAA Travel Challenges, nor placed first or second in team rounds of previous National AAA Travel Challenges

== Procedure ==
=== Registration ===
The competition began in December, when registration on the AAA Travel Challenge Official Site opened. Eligible students could apply and create a unique username and password which they would later use for the Stage One Internet test. From 2007 onward, students could also indicate if they desired to participate in the travel career-related Essay Competition.

A student could, at any time, take a Practice Test offered on the Official Site, which gave a general sampling of questions that might have appeared.

=== Stage One: Internet Test ===
For a specified period of time in January (usually 8–10 days), the Official Site would run the Stage One qualifying test. After students entered their unique user name and password, they would then proceed to the test.

The test consisted of 40 multiple-choice travel-themed questions to be completed in 15 minutes time (20 minutes from 2003 to 2006), with a countdown clock visible throughout the test. No two tests were alike, as the questions were picked from a pool of several thousand questions, with each test being "weighted" with an equal number of easy, medium, and hard questions. Neither reference materials (printed or electronic) nor help from another person was allowed, and this was agreed to when a student checked the "Integrity Oath" box during registration.

Questions had to do with destinations popular with American tourists, with most questions centering on the United States and foreign destinations such as Europe and East Asia.

The top five scorers in each state would advance to Stage Two (state of residence, not school, determined in which state one is competing for). In the event of a tie, the student(s) who used the least amount of time to answer questions would advance (from 2003 to 2006, random drawings initially served as tiebreakers). If a tie still existed, then, like in previous years, a random drawing determined who advances. These Top Five were usually notified 1–2 weeks after the testing period ended via e-mail. If one of the five was unable to continue, or if nothing was heard from after 72 hours of the notification e-mail being sent, then the next highest scorer would be notified.

=== Stage Two: The State Test ===
Once all five in each state and D.C. had been confirmed (255 across the nation), each student would be sent an information packet with instructions for Stage Two.

Stage Two was another 40 multiple-choice question, 15-minute test (20 minutes from 2003 to 2006), this time, however, written and taken at the nearest AAA Office nearest to the contestant's home. The test was monitored by a AAA Official. The time period for taking the test was usually three days in March, and arrangements (through AAA) had to have been made with the office at which the test would be taken.

Questions again focused on tourist destinations, but this time become more global in nature and slightly more obscure. It is unknown whether tests were the same throughout the nation or if each state or even each individual received different tests, like Stage One.

The winner, the top scorer of the five in each state, was notified approximately one week after the testing period finishes. If the winner was unable to proceed, then the next highest scorer would notified. In the event of a tie for the top score, a random drawing determined the winner.

=== Stage Three: The National Finals ===
The National Finals were a four-day event usually held in early to mid May. Each of the 51 Stage Two Winners and one chaperone per finalist were awarded an all-expenses paid trip to Orlando, Florida, for the competition. Additional guests could attend, and arrangements could be made through AAA Travel at the expense of the Finalist's family.

==== Phase One: The Preliminary Test ====
The first phase was a preliminary test taken by all 51 finalists, usually in a conference room held at a sponsor hotel. The test was once again a monitored 40-question multiple choice written test to be completed in 20 minutes. Questions at this level were at their hardest yet, focusing mostly on global destinations, some familiar, but most obscure.

==== Phase Two: The Individual Competition ====
The top 24 scorers on the written test were invited back to participate in Phase Two (random drawings served as tiebreakers). These 24 contestants were then divided into six preliminary groups, consisting of four participants each. Contestants within each group then participated in a single-elimination oral competition, answering more questions covering the material. One winner emerged in each group, and these six winners advanced to the second half of Phase Two.

The second half of Phase Two was an individual competition introduced for the 2006 Challenge. The six finalists (which, in 2006 only, were actually the twelve finalists who had participated in the team rounds) were brought out and assigned a random order to sit in on the stage. Each contestant was then asked a question, one by one, by moderator Dr. Marc Mancini. In a manner similar to the National Spelling Bee, if the student answered correctly, he advanced to the next round. If not, then the student was eliminated. If all the contestants in a round answered incorrectly, then all were brought back to participate in the next round.

The winner was the contestant who managed to answer his/her question correctly while everyone else in the round answered incorrectly, in addition to one more question. Such procedures allowed for ties for second and third place, as shown in the results of the 2006 and 2007 competitions.

After another day to enjoy Orlando, a banquet was held at the Hard Rock Live that evening. Prizes were officially awarded as well as other miscellaneous closing remarks and "housekeeping notes".

==== The Team Rounds (2003-2006) ====
The Top 12 scorers, with random drawings acting as tiebreakers, advanced to the second phase of the competition. These finalists were usually announced about 30 minutes after testing had completed. Afterwards the twelve finalists stayed for a briefing and practice round, as all were later released to enjoy Orlando.

The next day the 12 remaining contestants as well as the 39 other finalists and families gathered for the Final Round, usually at Universal Orlando (this competition was sometimes open to the public). The 12 Finalists had been divided into four teams of three contestants each. Three game-show style rounds were conducted. The first featured two teams versus each other. The second put the other two teams against each other. The winners of each of these rounds advanced to a final head-to-head round.

A round lasted 20 minutes, and featured these types of questions:

- Gateway Questions - worth 20 points, these were toss-up questions that could be answered by any team member buzzing in. If a contestant answered incorrectly, 20 points were deducted from the team's score, and the other team was then given a chance to answer. Team members were not allowed to consult with each other.
- Add-On Questions - posed to a team once one of their team members had answered a Gateway Question correctly. The question was divided into three parts, with each part worth ten points (e.g. "Name the three North American national capital cities with the word 'City' in their name"). Team members were allowed to consult with each other, and no points were deducted for an incorrect response.
- Upgrade Questions - a special kind of add-on, where teams could significantly increase their point total. Before the question was posed, the team was given a category to which the question pertained. The team then could wager up to 100 or their total number of points, whichever was lower. If the question was answered correctly, the team was awarded that number of points. An incorrect answer deducted that number of points from the team's score.

The winner of the round was the team with the highest score. The team competition was discontinued in 2007.

== Prizes ==
=== Trivia Competition ===
All participants in Stage One were given the option of printing a Certificate of Participation after completion of the Internet exam.

Individual states awarded miscellaneous prizes to participants of Stage Two, but none were awarded by AAA itself.

All Stage Three finalists were awarded the following by AAA and various sponsors:

- An all-expenses paid trip to Orlando, Florida, for them and one chaperone each.
- Two-day two-park passes for Universal Orlando (usually intended to be used during the National Finals)
- A $1,000 US Savings Bond
- Two $150 AAA Gift Cards (one for the finalist, and one for the chaperone)
- A trophy

The Top 24 Semifinalists (12 from 2003 to 2006) each received an additional $1,000 US Savings Bond and a trophy different from other finalists.

Top Prizes

- 2003-2005
  - First Place (team), a $25,000 Scholarship for each team member
  - Second Place (team), a $10,000 Scholarship for each team member
- 2006
  - First Place (individual), a $25,000 Scholarship
  - Second Place (individual), a $15,000 Scholarship
  - Third Place (individual), a $10,000 Scholarship
  - First Place (team), a $10,000 U.S. Savings Bond for each team member
  - Second Place (team), a $5,000 U.S. Savings Bond for each team member
- 2007
  - First Place, a $20,000 Scholarship
  - Second Place, a $10,000 Scholarship
  - Third Place, a $5,000 Scholarship‡

‡Due to a four-way tie for third place, a last minute executive decision doubled the Third Place prize money to $10,000, which was to be split evenly among the four students ($2,500 each).

=== Essay Competition ===
- 2007
  - All Stage Two Finalists received a $1,000 Scholarship for any travel, tourism, or hospitality-related career studies
  - The national essay winner received a $5,000 Scholarship for any travel, tourism, or hospitality-related career studies

== Champions ==
No two First Place champions (either individual or team) came from the same state. Each of the following states had two top finishers: Virginia, Massachusetts, South Carolina, Indiana, Colorado, Louisiana, Ohio, and Washington. The two who came from both Colorado and South Carolina were pairs of siblings.

Year	First place winner	Home state	Second place winner	Home state	Third place winner	Home state
2003	Felix Peng	Connecticut	Kellie Packwood	Indiana	--	
2003	Alexander Smith	North Carolina	John Solter	Kansas	--	
2003	Steven Young	Virginia	David Beihl	South Carolina	--	
2004	Chris Meyer	South Dakota	Drew Fleeter	Virginia	--	
2004	Nicholas Jachowski	Maryland	Matthew Moran	Massachusetts	--	
2004	Joshua Baumgartner	Texas	Thomas Beihl	South Carolina	--	
2005	Pratyush Buddiga	Colorado	Bill Isaacs	Ohio	--	
2005	Carson Qing	New Jersey	John Rice	North Dakota	--	
2005	Michael Oh	New York	Katherine (Katie) Schulz	Louisiana	--	
2006	Individual: Karan Takhar	Massachusetts	Individual: Akshay Buddiga	Colorado	Individual: Matthew Alexander	Ohio
2006	Individual: Karan Takhar	Massachusetts	Individual: Akshay Buddiga	Colorado	Individual: Alexander King	Washington
2006	Team: Andrew Lai	California	Team: Ben Schwartz	Rhode Island	--	
2006	Team: Thimal de Alwis	Louisiana	Team: Matthew Alexander	Ohio	--	
2006	Team: Erik Bolt	Indiana	Team: Karan Takhar	Massachusetts	--	
2007	Samuel Brandt	Oregon	Yeshwanth Kandimalla	Georgia	Dan Auerbach	Illinois
2007	Samuel Brandt	Oregon	Yeshwanth Kandimalla	Georgia	Neeraj Sirdeshmukh	New Hampshire
2007	Samuel Brandt	Oregon	Yeshwanth Kandimalla	Georgia	Dallas Simons	Tennessee
2007	Samuel Brandt	Oregon	Yeshwanth Kandimalla	Georgia	Stephen Kirkpatrick	Washington
