= Sydney Airport (disambiguation) =

Sydney Airport (Sydney Kingsford Smith Airport) is in Sydney, Australia

Sydney Airport may also refer to:

- JA Douglas McCurdy Sydney Airport, in Nova Scotia, Canada
- Western Sydney Airport, in Badgerys Creek, Australia

== See also ==
- Sidney Municipal Airport (disambiguation)
- Sydney Airport Holdings, owner of the airport operator for Sydney Kingsford Smith Airport
