= Sidney, Ohio =

- City
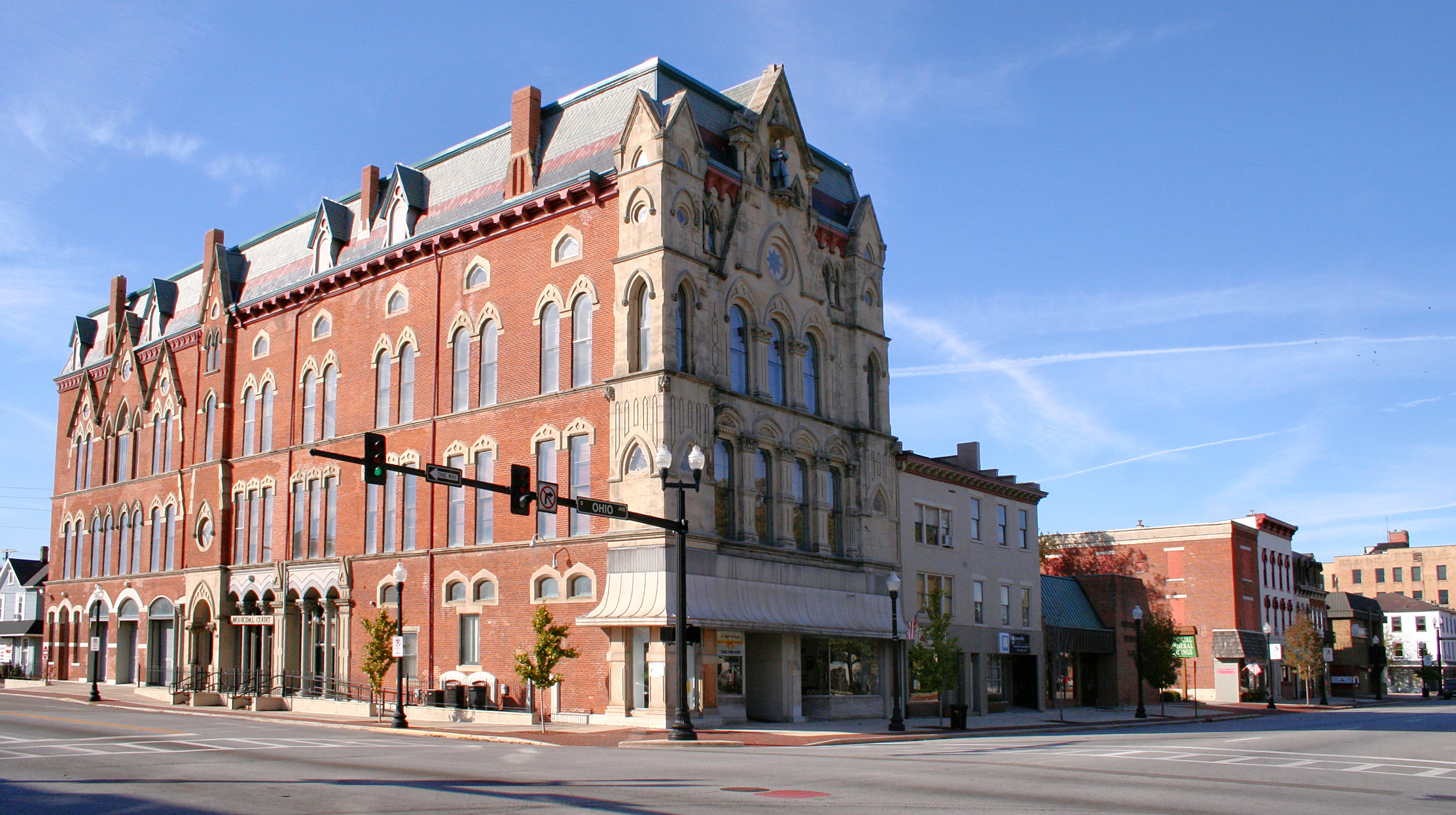
- Sidney downtown, with the municipal courts in the Monumental Building.

- Flag Logo
- Nickname: Writer city
- Interactive map of Sidney, Ohio
- Location within Ohio Location within the United States
- Coordinates: 40°17′03″N 84°09′20″W
- Country: United States
- State: Ohio
- County: Shelby

Government
  - Mayor: Mike Barhorst
  - City Manager: Andrew Bowsher

Area
  - Total: 12.10 sq mi (31.34 km^{2})
  - Land: 11.97 sq mi (31.00 km^{2})
  - Water: 0.13 sq mi (0.34 km^{2})
- Elevation: 1,037 ft (316 m)

Population (2020)
  - Total: 20,589
  - Density: 1,720/sq mi (664.1/km^{2})
- Time zone: UTC-5 (Eastern (EST))
  - Summer (DST): UTC-4 (EDT)
- ZIP codes: 45365, 45367
- Area codes: 937, 326
- FIPS code: 39-72424
- GNIS feature ID: 2395881
- Website: www.sidneyoh.com

Sidney is a city in Shelby County, Ohio, United States, and its county seat. The population was 20,589 at the 2020 census. It is approximately 36 miles (58 km) north of Dayton and 100 miles (160 km) south of Toledo, and is a part of the Dayton metropolitan area. The city is named after English poet Philip Sidney, and many of Sidney's elementary schools are named after famous writers, including Ralph Waldo Emerson, Henry Wadsworth Longfellow, and John Greenleaf Whittier. Sidney was the recipient of the 1964 All-America City Award. In 2009, it was the subject of the documentary film 45365.

== History ==
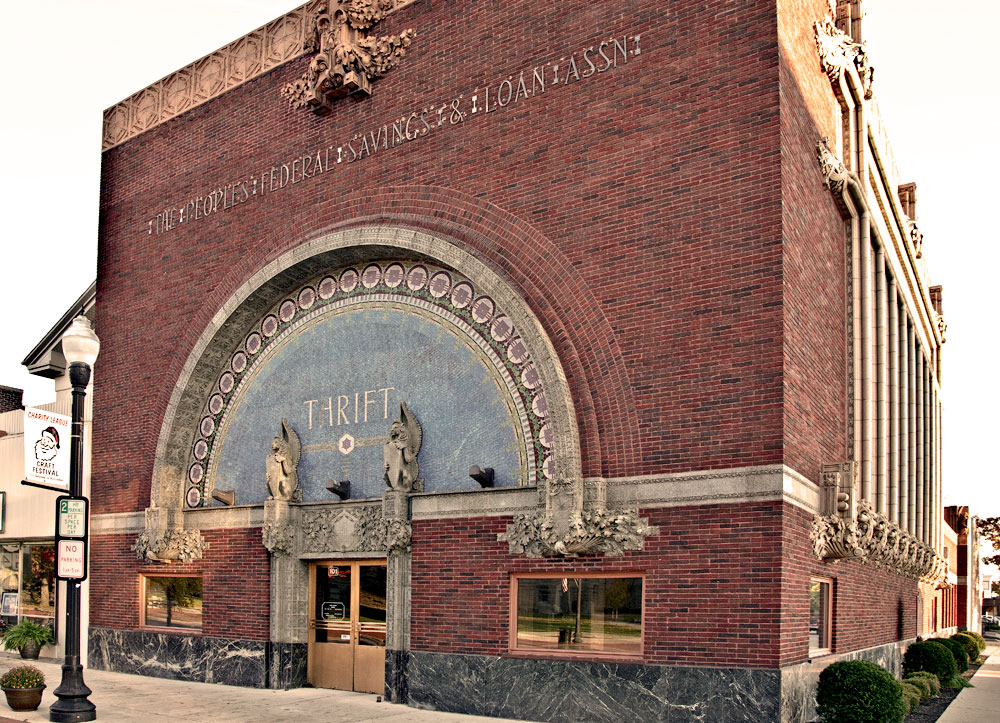
The 1918 Thrift Building, home to the People's Federal Savings and Loan Association, is a 20th-century icon. Its oversized arch is a signature element of its architect Louis Sullivan, who was mentor to Frank Lloyd Wright.

Sidney, named after Sir Philip Sidney, a well-known poet and member of British Parliament, was originally a 70-acre (280,000 m^{2}) parcel of land located along the west side of the Great Miami River. This land was donated by Charles Starrett to be used as the site of a new town designated to be the county seat of Shelby County. The area around Sidney was once the richly forested hunting ground of the Shawnee and Miami Indian nations. This fertile area was developed as agricultural lands over time.

The construction of the Miami-Erie Canal between 1825 and 1837 connected Sidney in a north–south direction with the major trade centers in Ohio. In addition to opening the first significant "outside" trade for Sidney, the construction of the canal attracted an influx of settlers to the area. From the 1840s to 1913, canal boats carried Shelby County's products to Cincinnati or Toledo. Sidney was crossed by the Miami and Erie Canal's Sidney or Port Jefferson Feeder Branch. Before railroads came to Sidney, the canal provided most transportation, as roads were unpaved and not usable in all seasons. Part of the canal remains south of Water Street.

As the influence of the canal declined, another transportation element, railroads, began to develop in Sidney. East–west rail began to be laid in 1851, followed by north–south rail in 1856. Sidney is still served by these railroad lines.

In the 1950s, the Interstate Highway contributed to the development of Sidney. It was named as "All-America City" in 1964. Today, Interstate 75 connects Sidney with Canada to the north, and Florida to the south. Sidney has four interchanges with Interstate 75, providing access for both commercial and industrial users.

Sidney has an extensive parks and recreation system. When the city's first comprehensive plan was being developed in the mid-1950s, the city decided to have a park or recreation area within a half-mile of every residence. This goal has resulted in a system of 14 neighborhood parks, a baseball complex, softball complex, soccer complex, municipal swimming pool, and the 180-acre (0.73 km^{2}) Tawawa Park, a nature and picnic area.

Sidney is the hometown of Paul Lauterbur, a renowned scientist and Nobel Prize winner who helped develop the MRI.

In 1984, President Ronald Reagan visited the city of Sidney on a train (the same train that President Franklin D. Roosevelt used during his visit to Sidney in 1944) while touring the country. President George W. Bush visited the town in 2004, eating at the Spot Restaurant in downtown Sidney. Republican presidential candidate Mitt Romney visited the Shelby County Fairgrounds in Sidney in 2012.

Sidney, Iowa, derives its name from the community.

The town of Buckeye, Arizona, was originally named after Sidney. Malin M. Jackson, who built Arizona's Buckeye Canal, was from Sidney, Ohio.

== Geography ==
According to the United States Census Bureau, the city has a total area of 12.15 square miles (31.47 km^{2}), of which 12.02 square miles (31.13 km^{2}) is land and 0.13 square miles (0.34 km^{2}) is water.

=== Climate ===
Climate data for Sidney, Ohio (1991–2020 normals, extremes 1978–present)
Month	Jan	Feb	Mar	Apr	May	Jun	Jul	Aug	Sep	Oct	Nov	Dec	Year
Record high °F (°C)	66 (19)	74 (23)	86 (30)	88 (31)	93 (34)	102 (39)	101 (38)	100 (38)	98 (37)	97 (36)	80 (27)	71 (22)	102 (39)
Mean maximum °F (°C)	57.4 (14.1)	61.5 (16.4)	70.9 (21.6)	80.1 (26.7)	86.5 (30.3)	91.8 (33.2)	92.2 (33.4)	91.2 (32.9)	89.9 (32.2)	82.3 (27.9)	69.5 (20.8)	60.1 (15.6)	94.1 (34.5)
Mean daily maximum °F (°C)	34.4 (1.3)	38.5 (3.6)	48.9 (9.4)	62.3 (16.8)	72.8 (22.7)	81.2 (27.3)	84.3 (29.1)	83.0 (28.3)	77.9 (25.5)	65.2 (18.4)	51.1 (10.6)	39.6 (4.2)	61.6 (16.4)
Daily mean °F (°C)	26.2 (−3.2)	29.3 (−1.5)	38.5 (3.6)	50.0 (10.0)	61.0 (16.1)	70.1 (21.2)	73.2 (22.9)	71.4 (21.9)	65.2 (18.4)	53.3 (11.8)	41.3 (5.2)	31.7 (−0.2)	50.9 (10.5)
Mean daily minimum °F (°C)	17.9 (−7.8)	20.1 (−6.6)	28.0 (−2.2)	37.8 (3.2)	49.1 (9.5)	58.9 (14.9)	62.1 (16.7)	59.8 (15.4)	52.5 (11.4)	41.5 (5.3)	31.5 (−0.3)	23.9 (−4.5)	40.3 (4.6)
Mean minimum °F (°C)	−5.2 (−20.7)	1.8 (−16.8)	10.6 (−11.9)	23.5 (−4.7)	34.4 (1.3)	45.9 (7.7)	51.6 (10.9)	49.9 (9.9)	39.6 (4.2)	27.9 (−2.3)	17.2 (−8.2)	5.6 (−14.7)	−8.4 (−22.4)
Record low °F (°C)	−31 (−35)	−17 (−27)	−9 (−23)	13 (−11)	24 (−4)	36 (2)	44 (7)	40 (4)	30 (−1)	19 (−7)	2 (−17)	−22 (−30)	−31 (−35)
Average precipitation inches (mm)	2.89 (73)	2.31 (59)	3.17 (81)	4.08 (104)	4.08 (104)	4.70 (119)	4.57 (116)	3.76 (96)	3.11 (79)	2.89 (73)	3.17 (81)	2.92 (74)	41.65 (1,058)
Average precipitation days (≥ 0.01 in)	11.3	10.9	12.0	12.1	13.2	12.0	11.3	9.1	8.1	9.1	9.9	11.5	130.5
Source: NOAA

== Demographics ==
Historical population
Census	Pop.	Note	%±
1830	240		—
1840	713		197.1%
1850	1,302		82.6%
1860	2,055		57.8%
1870	2,808		36.6%
1880	3,823		36.1%
1890	4,850		26.9%
1900	5,688		17.3%
1910	6,607		16.2%
1920	8,590		30.0%
1930	9,301		8.3%
1940	9,790		5.3%
1950	11,491		17.4%
1960	14,663		27.6%
1970	16,332		11.4%
1980	17,658		8.1%
1990	18,710		6.0%
2000	20,211		8.0%
2010	21,229		5.0%
2020	20,589		−3.0%
2025 (est.)	20,124		−2.3%

=== 2020 census ===
As of the 2020 census, Sidney had a population of 20,589. The median age was 38.7 years, 24.7% of residents were under the age of 18, and 17.0% of residents were 65 years of age or older. For every 100 females there were 96.5 males, and for every 100 females age 18 and over there were 93.3 males age 18 and over.

As of the 2020 census, 98.7% of residents lived in urban areas, while 1.3% lived in rural areas.

There were 8,535 households in Sidney, of which 29.1% had children under the age of 18 living in them. Of all households, 40.7% were married-couple households, 20.8% were households with a male householder and no spouse or partner present, and 30.0% were households with a female householder and no spouse or partner present. About 32.2% of all households were made up of individuals and 13.3% had someone living alone who was 65 years of age or older.

There were 9,190 housing units, of which 7.1% were vacant. The homeowner vacancy rate was 2.2% and the rental vacancy rate was 6.4%.

Racial composition as of the 2020 census
Race	Number	Percent
White	17,749	86.2%
Black or African American	722	3.5%
American Indian and Alaska Native	57	0.3%
Asian	375	1.8%
Native Hawaiian and Other Pacific Islander	24	0.1%
Some other race	312	1.5%
Two or more races	1,350	6.6%
Hispanic or Latino (of any race)	516	2.5%

=== 2010 census ===
As of the census of 2010, there were 21,229 people, 8,344 households, and 5,577 families residing in the city. The population density was 1,766.1 inhabitants per square mile (681.9/km^{2}). There were 9,265 housing units at an average density of 770.8 per square mile (297.6/km^{2}). The racial makeup of the city was 90.3% White, 3.7% African American, 0.2% Native American, 1.6% Asian, 0.2% Pacific Islander, 0.8% from other races, and 3.3% from two or more races. Hispanic or Latino of any race were 2.2% of the population.

There were 8,344 households, of which 35.4% had children under the age of 18 living with them, 45.7% were married couples living together, 15.2% had a female householder with no husband present, 6.0% had a male householder with no wife present, and 33.2% were non-families. 27.6% of all households were made up of individuals, and 10.2% had someone living alone who was 65 years of age or older. The average household size was 2.51 and the average family size was 3.01.

The median age in the city was 36.1 years. 27.2% of residents were under the age of 18; 8.6% were between the ages of 18 and 24; 25.6% were from 25 to 44; 26.2% were from 45 to 64; and 12.4% were 65 years of age or older. The gender makeup of the city was 49.1% male and 50.9% female.

=== 2000 census ===
As of the census of 2000, there were 20,211 people, 7,981 households, and 5,371 families residing in the city. The population density was 1,938.5 inhabitants per square mile (748.5/km^{2}). There were 8,557 housing units at an average density of 820.7 per square mile (316.9/km^{2}). The racial makeup of the city was 92.61% White, 3.06% African American, 0.24% Native American, 1.87% Asian, 0.10% Pacific Islander, 0.40% from other races, and 1.73% from two or more races. Hispanic or Latino of any race were 1.30% of the population.

There were 7,981 households, out of which 34.6% had children under the age of 18 living with them, 49.8% were married couples living together, 12.8% had a female householder with no husband present, and 32.7% were non-families. 27.4% of all households were made up of individuals, and 10.3% had someone living alone who was 65 years of age or older. The average household size was 2.50 and the average family size was 3.03.

In the city the population was spread out, with 28.1% under the age of 18, 9.1% from 18 to 24, 29.7% from 25 to 44, 21.3% from 45 to 64, and 11.9% who were 65 years of age or older. The median age was 34 years. For every 100 females, there were 95.4 males. For every 100 females age 18 and over, there were 92.8 males.

The median income for a household in the city was $38,663, and the median income for a family was $45,672. Males had a median income of $35,127 versus $22,497 for females. The per capita income for the city was $19,075. About 9.4% of families and 11.5% of the population were below the poverty line, including 15.5% of those under age 18 and 7.9% of those age 65 or over.

== Economy ==
Sidney is the headquarters location for many companies and a branch location for many others. Many companies were formed in Sidney and continued to be operated by local residents. A diversified employer base offers jobs in manufacturing (especially in the automotive industry) and service sectors. The largest employer in Sidney is Copeland, with more than 1,700 employees. In addition to the Sidney-based employers, Honda of America Anna engine plant, 7 miles north of Sidney, is the single largest employer in Shelby County, with 3,200 employees. Amos Press of Sidney publishes Coin World, Linn's Stamp News and other nationally distributed hobby publications. The agricultural base in the area has commodity grain, livestock, and dairy activities.

== Arts and culture ==
During the fall season, a large corn maze is created on the south side of town at Vandermark's Farm On Vandermark Road. The area has a driving range for golfers, an 18-hole miniature golf course, and a zip line. As of 2025, the Auto-Vue has been permanently closed.

The Historic Sidney Theatre, built in 1921, is located in downtown Sidney and has been recently renovated with a state of the art sound system for concerts, movies and live performances.

Gateway Arts Council, located in downtown Sidney, is Shelby County's premier non-profit arts organization. Gateway provides Shelby and surrounding counties with quality arts, entertainment, and cultural enrichment. Its diversified year-round programming includes events that appeal to all ages and interests.

A downtown revitalization group called Sidney Alive provides a farmers' market around the court square during growing season. They also put on events for the community, including an Easter egg hunt, Kids Around the Square, the Winter Wonderland Parade, the Chocolate Walk, horse and carriage rides, mystery dinners, and more. They work with the small downtown businesses to make Sidney a fun place for young professionals and families to live.

The Shelby County Historical Society operates the William A. Ross Junior Historical Society at 201 N. Main Street in Sidney. A collection of Sidney and Shelby County historical artifacts is available for viewing Monday through Friday, 1–5 pm and Saturday 9 am – noon. It is closed on Sunday and holidays.

For the outdoor enthusiast, local state parks include Lake Loramie, Kiser Lake, Indian Lake, and Grand Lake St Marys. They are easy drives from Sidney. Camping, boating, hunting, and fishing are common pursuits in the area.

=== Architecture ===
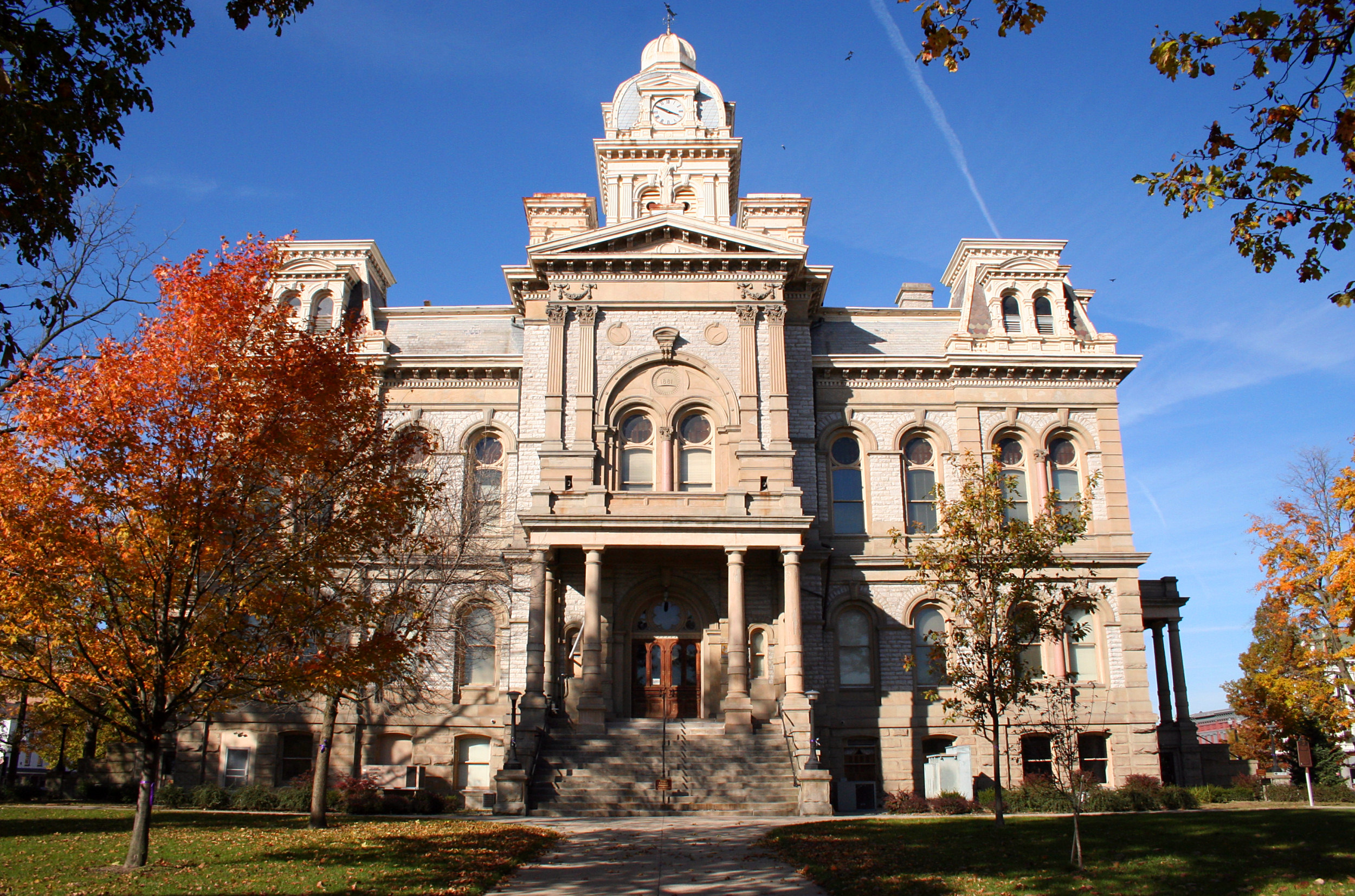
Shelby County Courthouse. The Courthouse, which occupies one city-block known as Court Square, was recently named by the National Trust for Historic Preservation as one of the "Great American Public Places".

Sidney is home to the 1881 Second Empire courthouse; the 1877 Gothic revival Monumental Building, dedicated to the county's Civil War dead; and the 1918 early-modern People's Federal Savings and Loan Association designed by influential architect Louis Sullivan, which has been designated a National Historic Landmark.

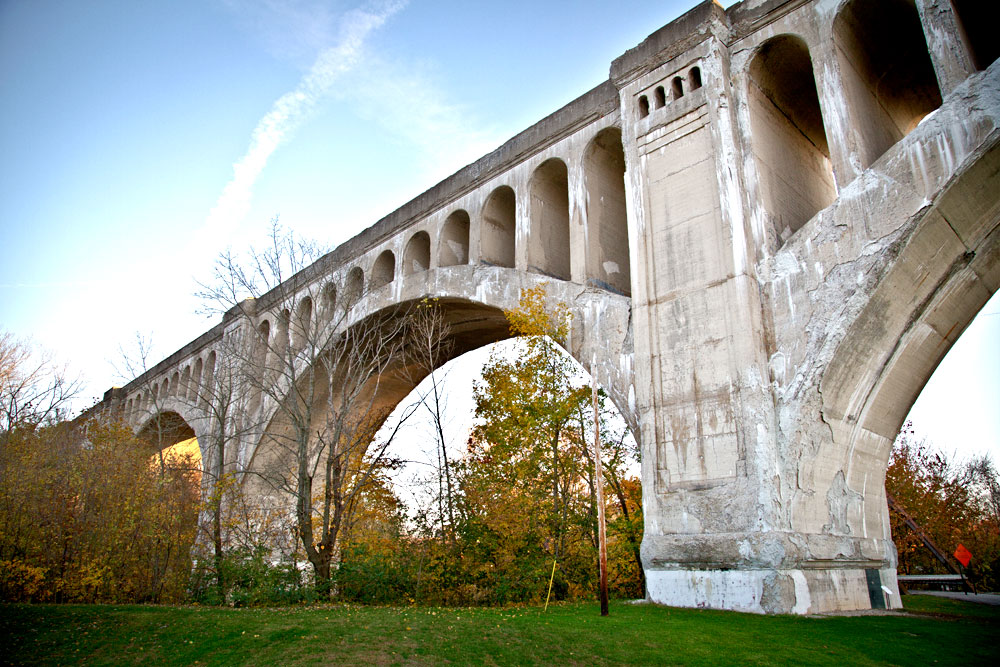
Big Four Bridge

The Big Four Bridge is a local landmark that has carried rail traffic since 1924. CSX Transportation uses the rail line and bridge as part of the "NYC" division of Conrail, a direct descendant of the New York Central Railroad and Penn Central Transportation. CSX also operates the north–south rail line, which was better known in earlier years as the Baltimore and Ohio Railroad and later as the Chessie System.

The Graceland Cemetery features monuments and memorials of large concrete angels and other structures and statues.

== Government ==
The city government is a council–manager system. The city council consists of a mayor and six members; three council members are elected at-large by all city voters, while the remaining four are elected from each of the four wards. All council members serve terms of four years. The mayor and vice-mayor are elected by the council with a majority vote and serve terms of two years. The council meets on the second and fourth Mondays of each month at 5:30 p.m. In addition to their bi-weekly meetings, the City Council meets on the first Monday of each month in workshop sessions as needed. Most meetings are held in the municipal building council chambers.

Council members include: Mike Barhorst, Mayor (at-large), Steve Wagner, Vice Mayor (Fourth Ward), Joe Moniaci (Second Ward), Scott Roddy (Third Ward), Mardie Milligan (First Ward), Cory Huelskamp (at-large), and Jenny VanMatre (at-large).

The city council appoints a professional manager to oversee the administrative operations, implement its objectives, and advise it on all related matters. The manager position is similar to that of a corporate chief executive officer (CEO), providing professional management to the board of directors. The current City Manager is Andrew Bowsher, who was appointed in September 2021. He is the 14th city manager to serve the City of Sidney.

== Education ==
Sidney City School District operates four elementary schools, one middle school, and Sidney High School. Lehman Catholic High School, affiliated with the Roman Catholic Archdiocese of Cincinnati, and Sidney Christian Academy are also located within the city.

Sidney's public library, Amos Memorial Library, is a branch of Shelby County Libraries.

== Media ==
- The Sidney Daily News is published each day of the week except Sunday and Tuesday.
- WMVR-FM broadcasts hot adult contemporary programming on Hits 105.5 FM.
- KLOVE 94.1 FM (translator W231AZ)
- WHJM 88.7 FM "Radio Maria"

== Infrastructure ==
=== Air ===
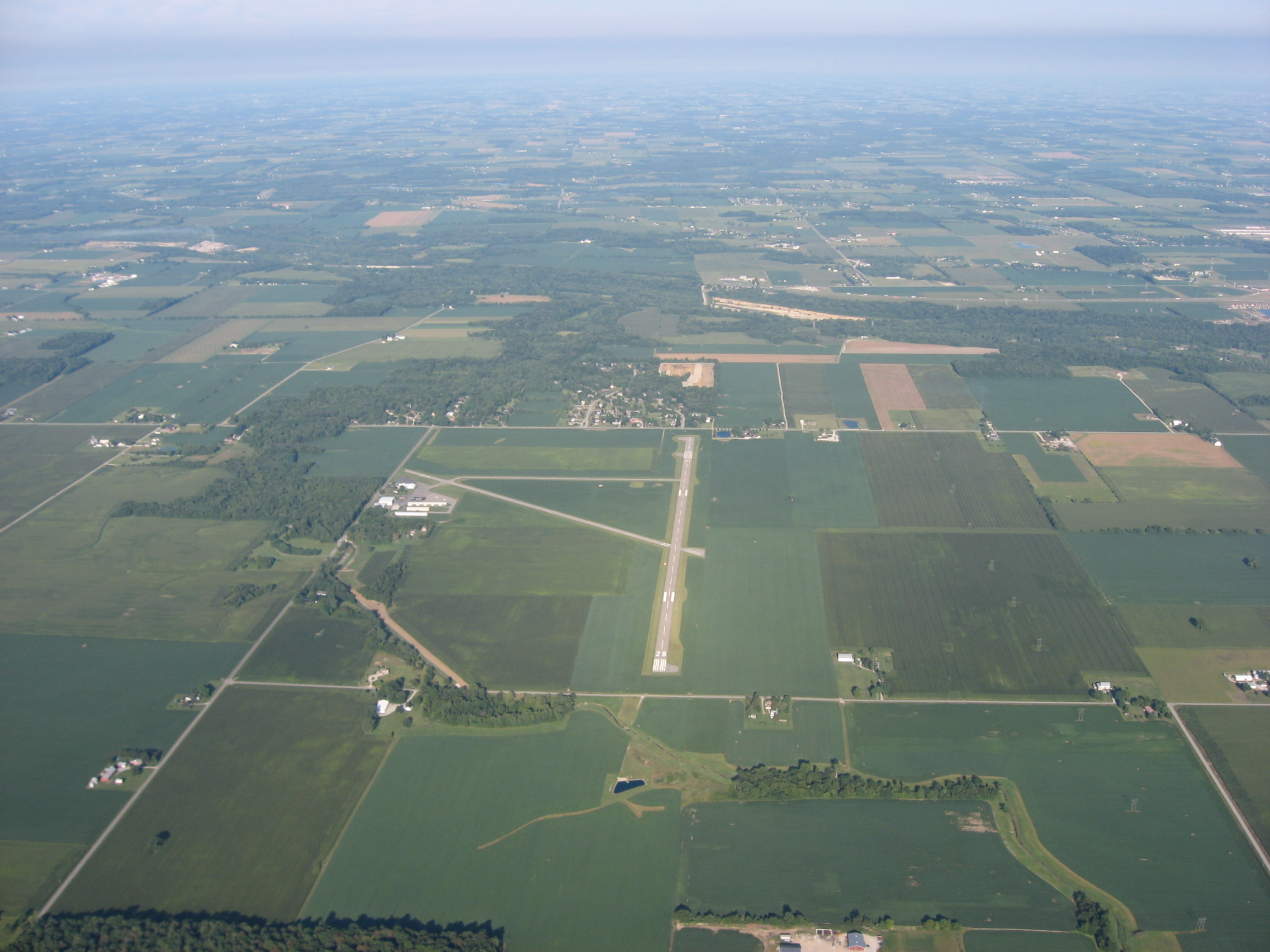
Aerial view of the Sidney Municipal Airport from the east

The Sidney City Airport is located three nautical miles (3.5 mi; 5.6 km) south of Sidney's central business district. Dayton International Airport is 35 miles (56 km) south while John Glenn Columbus International Airport which serves Central Ohio is 106 miles (171 km) east.

=== Rail ===
Sidney has active two railroad lines. Both were built independently in the 1850s.

Until the 1960s, passengers could take the Knickerbocker Limited from Sidney to Grand Central Terminal in New York City. This east–west line was built as the Bellefontaine and Indiana Railroad which ran from Galion, Ohio to Union City on the Ohio-Indiana border. It was built in conjunction with the Indianapolis and Bellefontaine Railroad, providing a route between Cleveland and the East and Indianapolis, and later St. Louis. In 1864, the two were merged into the "Bee" Line: the Bellefontaine Railway. In 1869, the lines were merged into the first "Big Four": the Cleveland, Columbus, Cincinnati and Indianapolis Railway. In 1889, the second "Big Four" was formed: the Cleveland, Cincinnati, Chicago and St. Louis Railway. In the early 1920s, this railroad relocated its tracks from downtown Sidney to the south edge of the city over the new Big Four concrete arch bridge. Early in the twentieth century, it was leased by the New York Central System. Later the Big Four was taken over by the Penn Central, then Conrail, and finally CSX Transportation.

Other concrete arch bridges in the region were designed and built for the Big Four; they are located in Avon and Greencastle, Indiana, and Danville, Illinois.

In the 1950s, passengers could board a train in Sidney and take it south to Cincinnati or New Orleans. This north–south line was built as the Dayton and Michigan Railroad. In the 1860s it was leased by the Cincinnati, Hamilton and Dayton Railroad. It was taken over by the Baltimore and Ohio Railroad early in the twentieth century. Later the line was taken over by the Chesapeake and Ohio Railway, then by CSX Transportation, and passenger services were reduced.

Former rail infrastructure in Sidney includes the Western Ohio Railway Sidney Freight Station at 724 North Main Avenue and the Sidney Big Four train station at 873 South Walnut Avenue.

=== Highway system ===
The Dixie Highway, later US 25, now known as County Rd 25A, ran north–south through downtown Sidney, connecting it with Toledo and Detroit to the north and Dayton and Cincinnati to the south. Interstate 75 was completed in the early 1960s. Located west of Sidney, it took the place of the Dixie Highway and most of the traffic. Four exits from I-75 provide direct access to Sidney: exit 90 (Fair Road), exit 92 (State Route 47), exit 93 (State Route 29), and exit 94 (County Road 25A).

== Notable people ==
- John Adams, former member of the Ohio House of Representatives
- Craig Clemons, retired NFL player
- Warren Davidson, member of the U.S. House of Representatives
- George Clyde Fisher, museum curator
- Dick Flanagan, NFL center
- Warren A. Haggott, congressman from Colorado
- Thomas Hazzard, football player and coach, minister, farmer, missionary, and riveter
- Richard Hodges, politician
- John Foley Horr, Civil War captain
- Marie Agnes H. Hyde, artist
- Brandon Knupp, stock racing driver
- Paul Lauterbur, chemist and Nobel Prize laureate
- Dale Locker, former member of the Ohio House of Representatives
- Joey Long, former Major League Baseball pitcher for San Diego Padres
- Louis Mackey, philosopher, Kierkegaard scholar, literary critic
- George Alexander Marshall, member of the U.S. House of Representatives from Ohio's 4th district
- Bruce Moon, art therapist and psychologist
- James Murray, 7th Ohio Attorney General
- Richard Pefferle, set decorator
- J. Edward Russell, member of the U.S. House of Representatives from Ohio's 4th district
- Rick Stockstill, head football coach at Middle Tennessee
