= Capt. John Foley Horr House =

Historic house in Florida, United States

- U.S. National Register of Historic Places
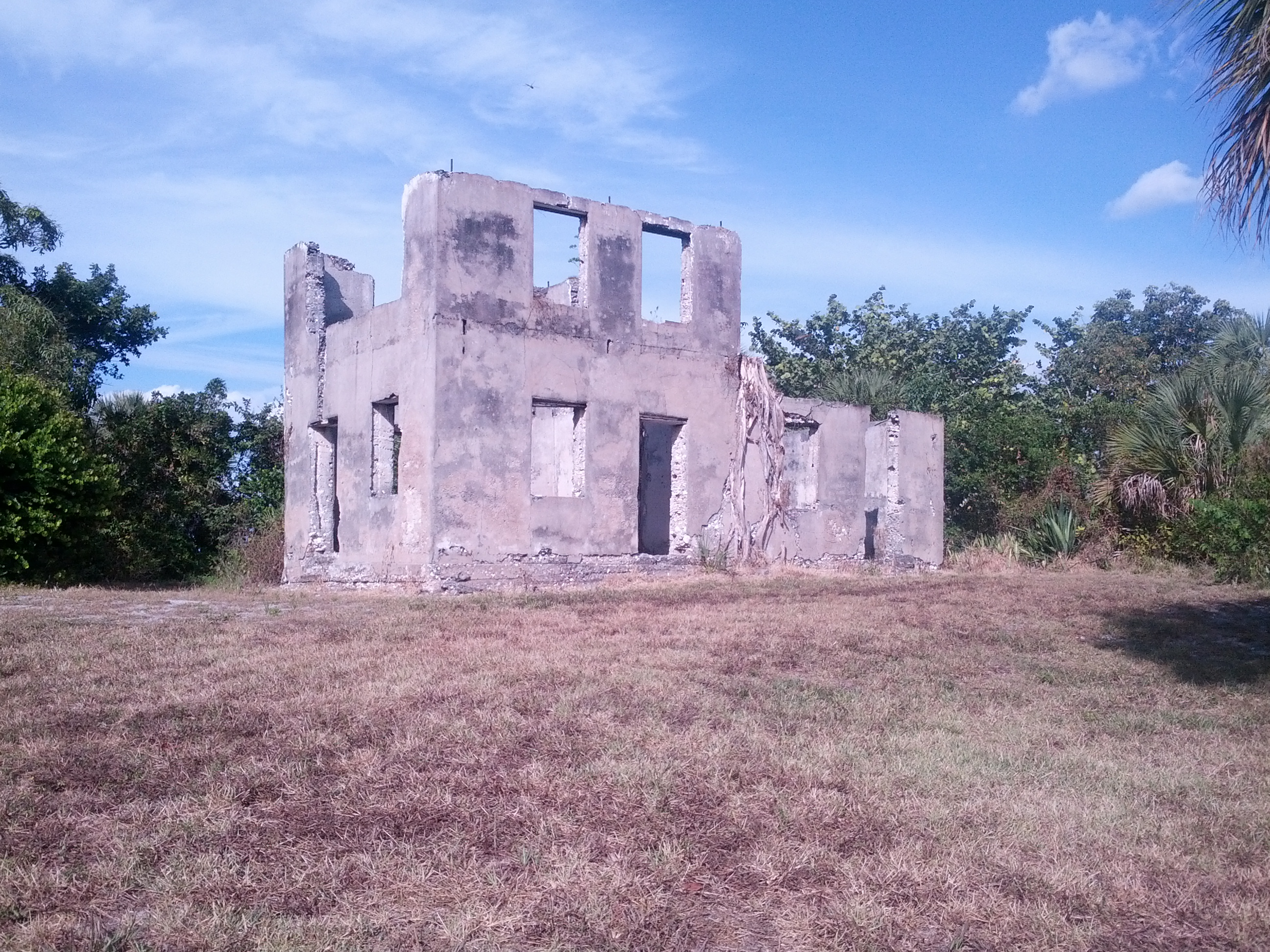
- Capt. John Foley Horr's House, Key Marco (Formerly Horr's Island), 2013

- Location within Florida Location within the United States
- Location: Marco Island, Florida
- Coordinates: 25°54′12″N 81°41′16″W
- NRHP reference No.: 97001215
- Added to NRHP: 8 October 1997

The Capt. John Foley Horr House is the historic residence of Captain John Foley Horr on the southern portion of Marco Island, Florida. It is located at the north side of Whiskey Creek Drive on Key Marco (formerly known as Horr's Island). Horr also established a citrus grove and pineapple plantation on the island. On October 8, 1997, the house, used by Horr as a residence, was added to the U.S. National Register of Historic Places. Today, only tabby ruins of the house remain.

Capt. John Foley Horr's House, Horr's Island, 1922
