= Marie Agnes H. Hyde =

Marie Agnes H. Hyde (October 12, 1882 – September 17, 1978) was an American painter, sculptor, and illustrator.

== Biography ==
Born in Sidney, Ohio, Hyde grew up with her grandparents Augustus Hyde and Eliza Hyde in Cleveland. She studied at the Cleveland School of Art, where her work won a prize. She graduated in 1905 and moved to New York to study at the Art Students League with William Merritt Chase and Frank Alvah Parsons. She may also have studied at the National Academy of Design.

Hyde's work was exhibited at the Museum of New Mexico, the Los Angeles Museum of History, Science and Art, and elsewhere, winning several prizes. One of her portrait miniatures is in the collection of the Metropolitan Museum of Art, New York.

== Personal life ==
Hyde had a daughter, Rosalyn E. Hyde, with whom she lived in San Francisco during the 1930s.
