= John Foley Horr =

Captain John Foley Horr (February 15, 1843 – February 13, 1926) was a resident and owner of Horr's Island (now known as Key Marco) located at the southern end of Marco Island, Florida. He was one of the notable federal officials in the State of Florida.

Horr was born on February 15, 1843, in Mechanicsburg, Ohio.

Horr was a Civil War veteran, enlisting as a Union soldier in 1861 with the 2nd Ohio Volunteer Infantry. After the reorganization of the regiment in Camp Dennison, he was elected to the rank of Second Lieutenant. After the Battle of Perryville in 1862, he was promoted to First Lieutenant and soon after the Battle of Chickamauga in 1863, he was promoted to the rank of Captain.

After the end of the Civil War, Captain Horr moved to Nashville, Tennessee and was involved in the brokerage business. Shortly after, Captain Horr relocated to Kansas City, Missouri and purchased coal mines in Lexington, Missouri. As he grew his coal business, he built the Steamer J. F. Fraser to move his product through points along the Missouri River. Captain Horr eventually sold his mining interests and spent the next 5 years transporting products along the Red River and Ouachita River before eventually settling in Florida.

In 1876, Captain Horr was appointed to the Office of the Collector of Customs as a clerk in Key West. After about 4 years, he became a bookkeeper at the John White Bank of Key West. While working in Key West, Captain Horr had purchased an island (later named Horr's Island) in northern Monroe County (now Collier County) and established a prosperous pineapple plantation and packing business on the island to supply his wholesale grocery business in Key West. With the island's growing pineapple business, a residence was built for the Captain in 1877 along with a school to accommodate the growing number of residents.

In 1889, Captain Horr was appointed by President Harrison to be Collector of Customs for Key West. During these years, Key West witnessed its most prosperous years as a port. In February 1898, he was appointed as a Federal Marshal by President McKinley for the Jacksonville to Key West district of Florida and re-appointed again by President Roosevelt in 1902.

During the election of 1900, Captain Horr was selected to be the Republican nominee as Secretary of State for the State of Florida. In 1920, he retired to Ohio and eventually sold Horr's Island in 1923 for the sum of $10,000.

Captain John Foley Horr died in Jacksonville, Florida, on February 13, 1926.

His home on Horr's Island, the Captain John Foley Horr House, was listed in the U.S. National Register of Historic Places on October 8, 1997.

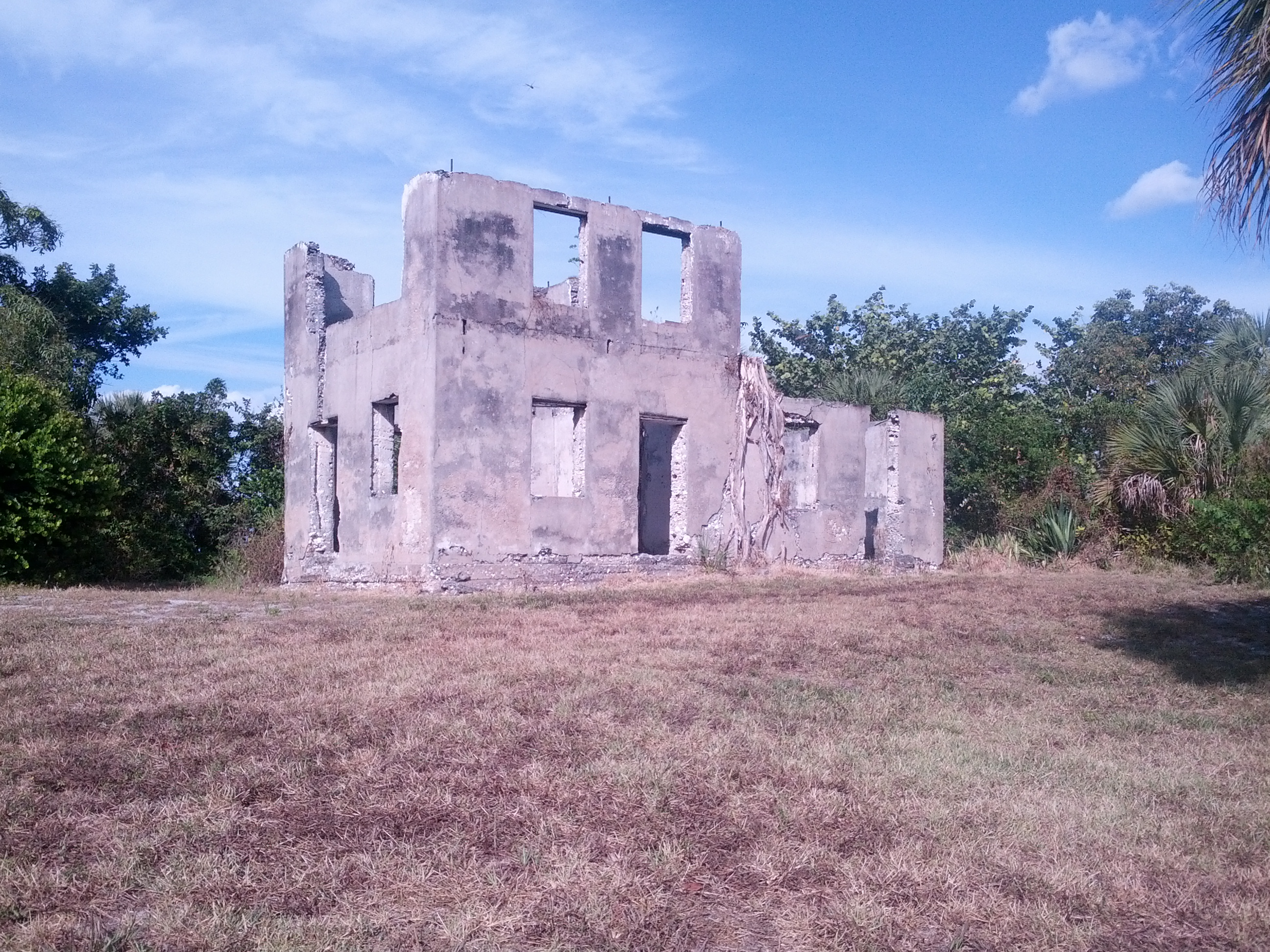
Capt. John Foley Horr's House, Key Marco (Formerly Horr's Island), 2013
