= Sidney City Airport =

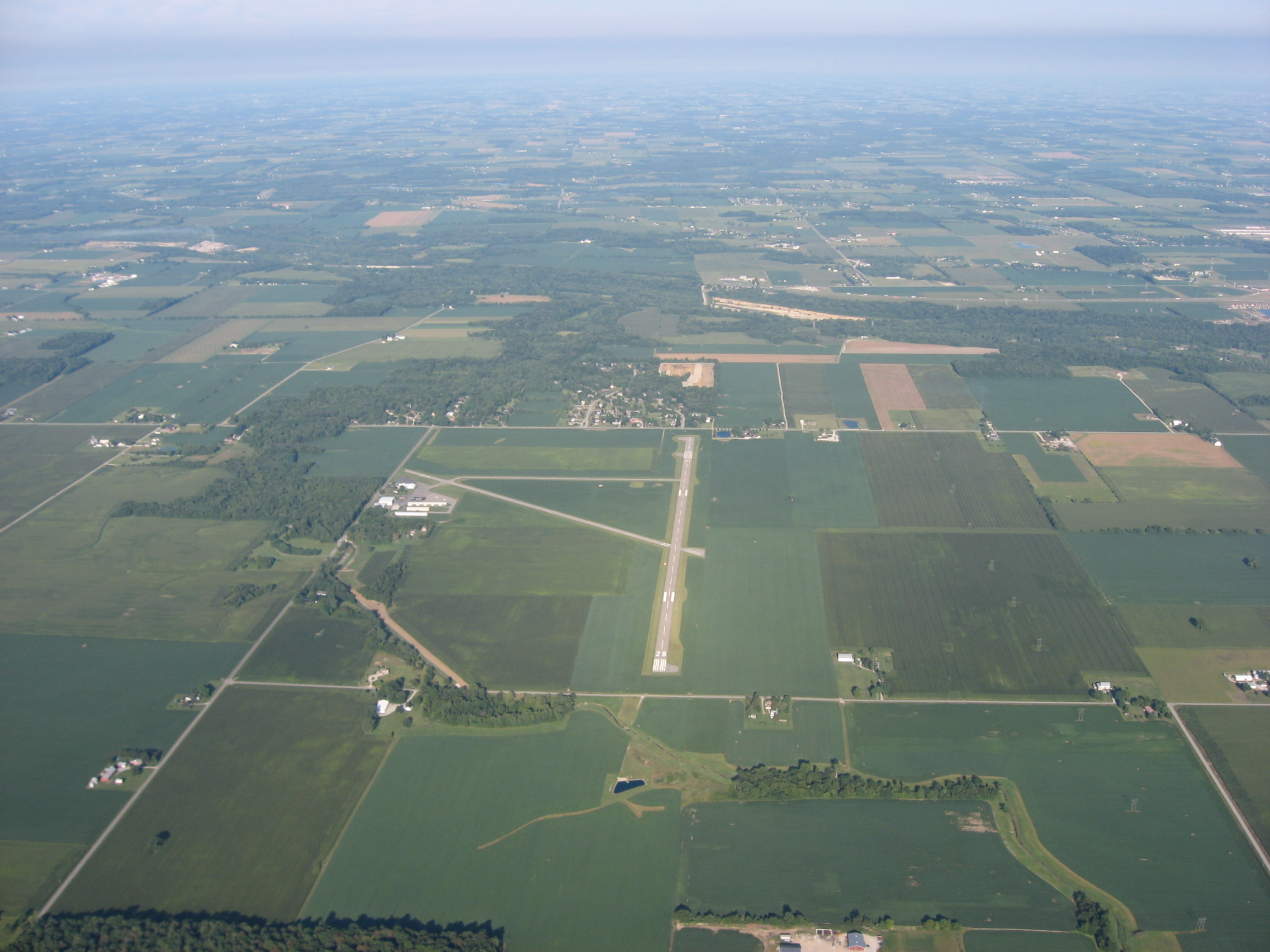
- IATA: none; ICAO: none; FAA LID: SCA

Summary
- Airport type: Public
- Owner: City of Sidney
- Serves: Sidney, Ohio
- Time zone: UTC−05:00 (-5)
  - Summer (DST): UTC−04:00 (-4)
- Elevation AMSL: 1,044 ft (318 m)
- Coordinates: 40°14′29″N 084°09′03″W

Map
- Location of airport in Ohio SCA (the United States)

Runways
Direction	Length		Surface
Direction	ft	m	Surface
10/28	5,013	1,528	Asphalt
	2,981	909	Asphalt

Statistics (2021)
- Aircraft operations: 20,500
- Based aircraft: 31
- Source: Federal Aviation Administration

Sidney City Airport (FAA LID: SCA), formerly known as Sidney Municipal Airport, is a city-owned public-use airport located three nautical miles (6 km) south of the central business district of Sidney, a city in Shelby County, Ohio, United States. It is included in the National Plan of Integrated Airport Systems for 2011–2015, which categorized it as a general aviation facility.

== History ==
Although a municipal airport was proposed as early as 1943, it was not until 1963 that Sidney would have one. (Note: There was a previous attempt to build an airport west of the city, but it closed.)

Willman Airport, established by Robert D. Willman, opened in 1957 as a private field and a little over two years later a 2,600-foot (790 m) paved runway was being built next to the existing strip. Renamed Sidney Airport by 1962, that August a plan was introduced to Sidney city council by four businessmen. It called for the municipality to acquire the airport and while the current owner would continue to operate it. By October, construction of a new 3,200-foot (980 m) northeast-southwest oriented runway was underway. The title for the airport was ceremonially presented to the city and the runway dedicated at an airshow on 30 May 1963. (Note: The title had been officially accepted on 21 January 1963.)

The airport's effort to obtain an Ohio airport grant in 1966 was hampered by the fact that its 3,280-foot (1,000 m) runway was already above state minimum length requirements. By that point, Sidney Aluminum Company, Copeland Refrigeration Corporation, Stolle Corporation and Sidney Trucking all operated business aircraft out of the airport. An anonymous private group purchased an 80 acres (32 ha) piece of property sought for the project in early October 1968. In an attempt to demonstrate public support, by mid-month 47 companies had pledged $51,000 to purchase 18 acres (7.3 ha) acres necessary for a runway extension. Upon opening bids in early March 1969, all were found to be in excess of the grant. Nevertheless, the city council voted to make up the difference and a contract was authorized four days later. Following approval of the grant in mid March, the contract was awarded in early April and construction on a 4,000-by-75-foot (1,219 m × 23 m) runway began in mid June. The runway was dedicated on 14 June 1970.

Consideration was given to closing the road at the eastern end of the east-west runway in 1986 as part of a plan to lengthen the runway.

A pilots' association was established at the airport in 1994.

A portion of Children's Home Road at the eastern edge of the airport was closed in August 2008 as preparation for extending the east-west runway 200 feet (61 m). The extension itself was dedicated on 12 November 2013. It was renamed Sidney City Airport in late March 2015. In 2021, the airport received funds to support operations during the COVID-19 pandemic. Throughout 2023, the airport received nearly $6 million to be used to maintain facilities and construct taxiways, logistics facilities, and new technological facilities. A parallel taxiway extension was opened in June 2025.

== Facilities and aircraft ==
Sidney City Airport covers an area of 83 acres (34 ha) at an elevation of 1,044 feet (318 m) above mean sea level. It has two runways with asphalt surfaces: 10/28 is 5,013 by 75 feet (1,528 x 23 m) and 5/23 is 2,981 by 50 feet (909 x 15 m).

The airport has a fixed-base operator that sells fuel and offers limited amenities.

For the 12-month period ending September 30, 2021, the airport had 20,500 aircraft operations, an average of 56 per day: 99% general aviation, 1% air taxi, and <1% military. At that time there were 31 aircraft based at this airport: 25 single-engine airplanes, 5 jet, and 1 multi-engine airplane.

== Accidents and incidents ==
- On 17 June 1987, a single engine airplane ran off the runway while landing at the airport.
- On 5 February 1991, a single engine airplane crashed while attempting to land at the airport in bad weather, killing the pilot.
- On April 16, 2007, a Mooney M20C sustained substantial damage during a forced landing after departure from the Sidney Municipal Airport. The airport experienced a power loss on departure. The aircraft was being ferried to a new owner in Arizona; the pilot had already aborted a takeoff because the plane's acceleration seemed slow, and he completed a second engine runup, which was normal. On the second takeoff, the engine felt to be slowing down, but all gauges indicated normal, so the pilot continued. However, the engine subsequently lost power after liftoff. The pilot executed a landing in a field ahead. The probable cause of the accident was found to be oil starvation as a result of improper maintenance; contributing factors were the fixed base operator's failure to advise the pilot that the engine had been operated without oil in the engine and soft terrain.

== See also ==
- List of airports in Ohio
