= Automobile Club of Southern California =

Motor club

- Headquarters: Los Angeles, California
- Region served: Southern California
- CEO: Greg Backley
- Parent organization: American Automobile Association
- Staff: Approximately 16,000
- Website: https://www.ace.aaa.com/

The Automobile Club of Southern California is the Southern California affiliate of the American Automobile Association (AAA) federation of motor clubs. The Auto Club was founded on December 13, 1900, in Los Angeles as one of the nation's first motor clubs dedicated to improving roads, proposing traffic laws, and improvement of overall driving conditions. Today, it is the single largest member of the AAA federation, with almost 8 million members in its home territory of Southern California, more than 16 million members across all subsidiaries in 21 states, and an annual budget in excess of $2 billion.

== History ==
=== Early years ===
Counties covered by the Automobile Club of Southern California (red) and California State Automobile Association (blue)

The Auto Club was an early advocate for the construction of the Ridge Route, the first highway through the Tehachapi Mountains and San Gabriel Mountains, which directly linked Los Angeles to Bakersfield and the Central Valley. The completion of the Ridge Route greatly facilitated automobile travel through this significant mountain barrier.

A 1921 Los Angeles Times announcement for The Auto Club Building.

Starting around 1910, the Auto Club sent teams of cartographers to survey the state's roads for the production of maps and to create a uniform signing system. The Auto Club posted thousands of porcelain-on-steel traffic signs throughout the state and continued to do so until the State of California took over the task in the mid-1950s. The signs were produced by a local company that manufactured porcelain-on-steel bathtubs. A few of these signs remain in service today, though they are extremely rare.

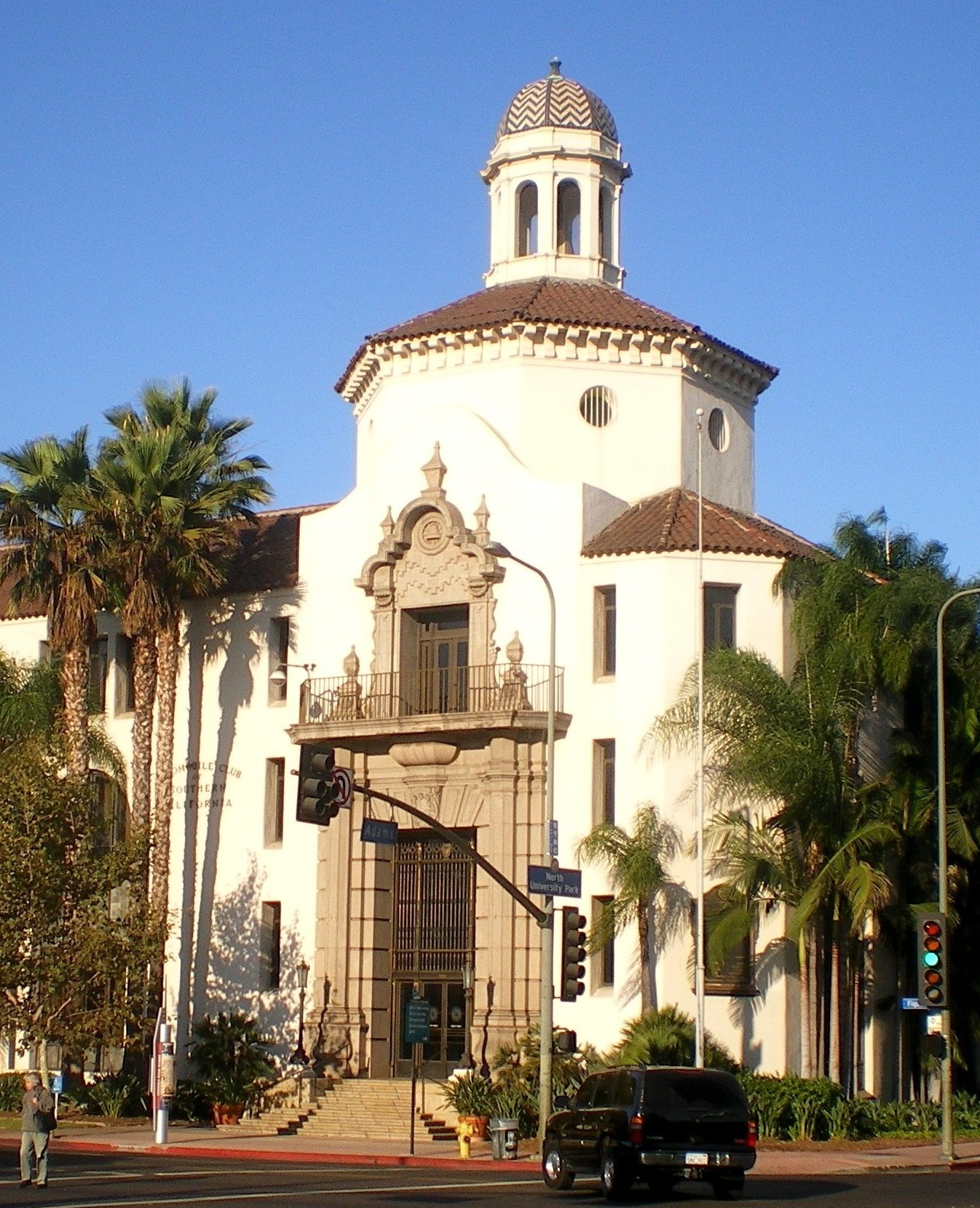
Automobile Club of Southern California, 2022

In 1923, the Auto Club's main office on the corner of Figueroa Street and Adams Boulevard in the West Adams district was completed. Architects Sumner P. Hunt and Silas R. Burns designed a building of "attractive Spanish design" that was a "distinctive structure for the West Adams district". On February 3, 1971, the building became Los Angeles Historic-Cultural Monument #71. The building now serves as the Los Angeles branch office. The club's headquarters are still in Los Angeles but its administrative offices are in Costa Mesa.

From 1934 through 1941, the building's courtyard served as the site of the Auto Club's annual "Outing Show," which promoted motor vacations and camping. These events were halted after the start of the war and were never revived. During the course of the war, the Auto Club played a leadership role in scrap rubber and metal drives and printed numerous posters for the war effort, including the "Give Them a Lift" campaign, which encouraged motorists to give rides to hitchhiking servicemen.

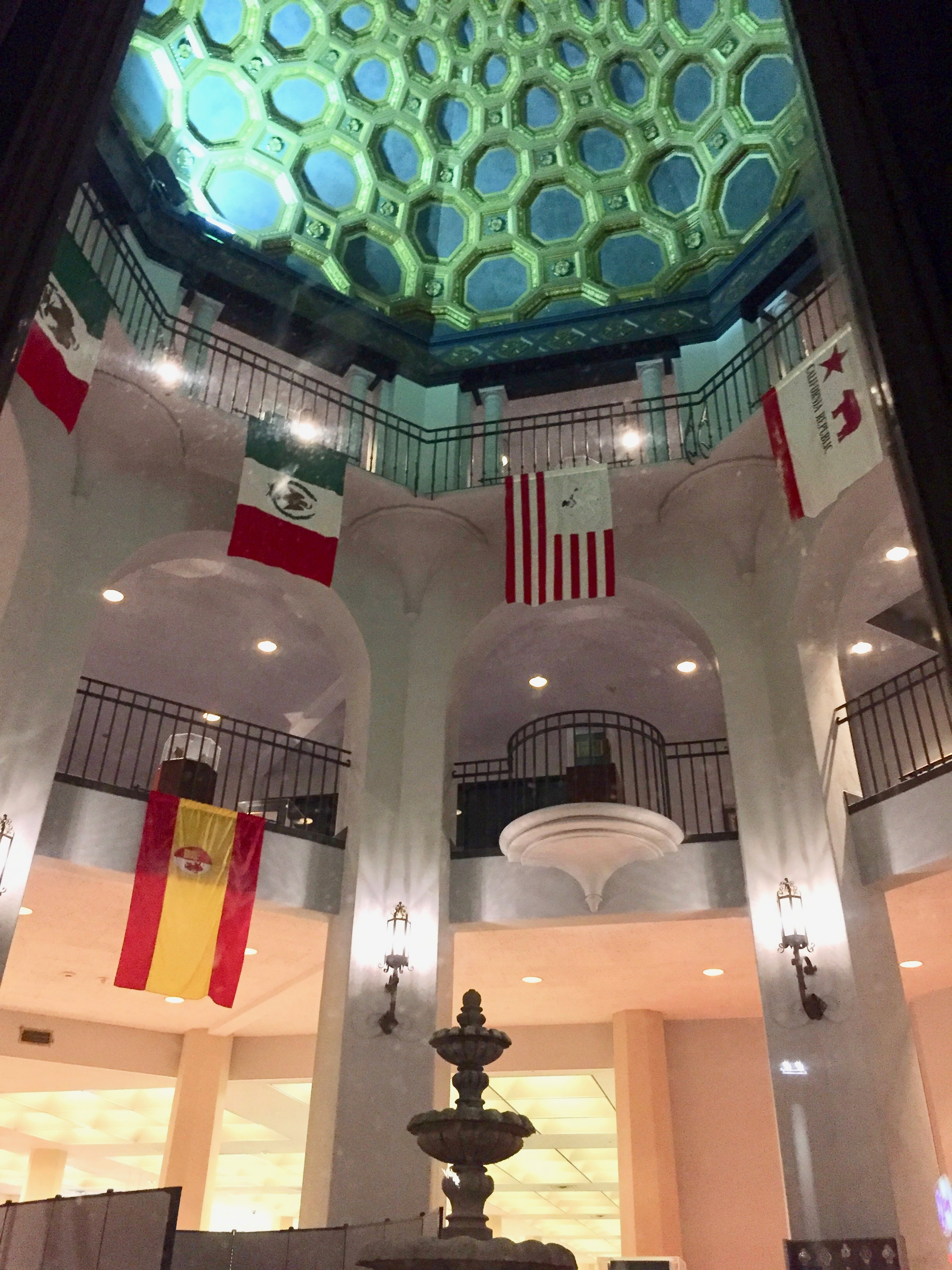
Inside the main office

The Auto Club has also experienced its share of scandals. In 1970, the Auto Club incurred the wrath of Los Angeles city councilman Marvin Braude when it opposed an initiative that would have authorized diversion of state fuel tax revenues away from road construction to reducing smog and expanding mass transit. Braude ran for the Auto Club's board the next year and lost, then promptly sued the Auto Club over alleged unfairness in its election procedures that enabled the incumbent board to make itself self-perpetuating. His lawsuit dragged on for over 15 years and involved three trials and three appeals, all of which Braude ultimately won. In the end, the Auto Club was forced to revise its election procedures to give board outsiders a better chance of actually winning seats, and it was ordered to pay Braude's attorney's fees. Furthermore, the Braude case revealed that the Auto Club had been exploiting several loopholes in California corporate law, which caused the state Legislature to enact a comprehensive revision of the California Nonprofit Corporation Law in 1978.

=== Recent years ===
Today, the Automobile Club of Southern California's affiliated insurance company, the Interinsurance Exchange of the Auto Club, is one of California's largest insurers. It provides coverage for automobiles, homes, recreational vehicles, motorcycles and watercraft. It also provides umbrella (liability) insurance. It is organized as a reciprocal inter-insurance exchange rather than as a conventional insurance company.

In 2024, Canadian company Wawanesa Insurance sold its US operations to the Automobile Club of Southern California

The Auto Club is the largest member of the AAA federation. The Auto Club is still a membership organization, and provides as a member benefit maps, travel planning, emergency roadside service, and DMV services. Members also receive Westways, a magazine devoted to travel and automotive subjects. Branch offices stretch from Chula Vista, near the international border with Mexico, to the small town of Bishop, in California's eastern Sierra mountains.

==== AAA expansion program ====
In 1996, the Auto Club began an expansion program that involved the purchase of or affiliation with several other AAA motor clubs across the country by acquiring AAA Hawaii, AAA New Mexico, and AAA Texas. It went on to affiliate with AAA Northern New England (serving New Hampshire, Vermont, and Maine) in 2003 and AAA Missouri (serving Louisiana, Arkansas, Mississippi, Missouri, and portions of Illinois and Indiana) in 2006. AAA Alabama was acquired in 2007. The Auto Club later affiliated with AAA East Central (serving portions of Kentucky, New York, Ohio, Pennsylvania, and West Virginia); it affiliated with AAA Tidewater in 2012.

==== Other affiliated programs ====
From Central California northward, the California State Automobile Association, now called AAA Northern California, Nevada & Utah, provides services to ACSC members who travel north. AAA Northern California and ACSC are both members of the AAA federation of motor clubs. While membership is not interchangeable among AAA clubs, each club provides certain services to all AAA members on a reciprocal basis, notably roadside assistance.

In recent years, the Auto Club has returned to its roots with involvement in auto racing, sponsoring the annual Auto Club 400 NASCAR Cup Series race in Fontana and NHRA Auto Club Finals in Pomona. The tracks where both events are held (Auto Club Speedway and Auto Club Raceway at Pomona, respectively), along with a drag strip in Bakersfield (Auto Club Famoso Raceway), all had naming rights held by the Auto Club. The Auto Club sponsors Team Penske driver Joey Logano's No. 22 Ford at the NASCAR Cup Series race in Fontana. The Auto Club also sponsors the NHRA funny car team John Force Racing and its driver Robert Hight. When the IndyCar Series ran at Auto Club Speedway in Fontana, Hélio Castroneves ran an Auto Club livery from 2012 to 2015. Castroneves is also a Team Penske driver.

== See also ==
- John W. Baumgartner, Los Angeles City Council member, 1933–35, opposed Auto Club signs on city streets
