= American Automobile Association =

Federation of motor clubs throughout the US

- Founded: March 4, 1902; 124 years ago Chicago, Illinois, U.S.
- Type: Umbrella organization
- Location: Heathrow, Florida, U.S.
- Products: Automotive services, insurance, banking, travel, hospitality inspections
- Services: Roadside assistance, auto repair, traveling, motoring advice, traffic safety, and others
- Chair: Malcolm L. McAllister
- Affiliations: AIT, FIA
- Website: aaa.com

The American Automobile Association (AAA) (Note: Commonly pronounced as "Triple A" or "Three A" but also pronounced as individual letters) is a federation of motor clubs throughout North America. AAA is a privately held not-for-profit national member association and service organization with over 60 million members in the United States and Canada. AAA provides services to its members, including roadside assistance and others. Its national headquarters are in Heathrow, Florida.

== History ==
The American Automobile Association (AAA) was founded on March 4, 1902, in Chicago, Illinois, in response to a lack of roads and highways suitable for automobiles. At that time, nine motor clubs with a total of 1,500 members banded together to form the AAA. Those individual motor clubs included the Chicago Automobile Club, Automobile Club of America, Automobile Club of New Jersey, and others. The Automobile Club of Buffalo joined in 1903. Winthrop E. Scarritt was its first president. One of the first things the organization advocated for was the building of a cross-country highway.

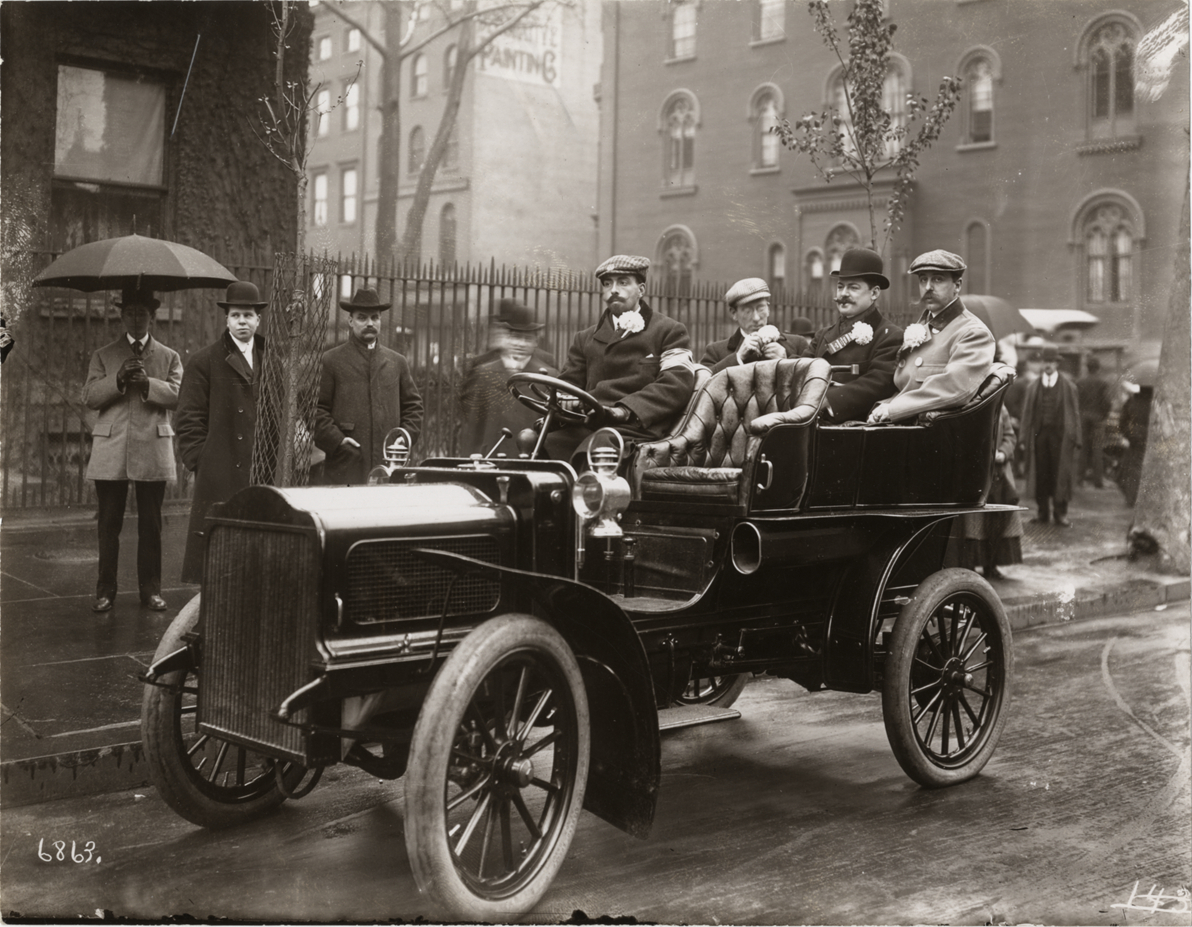
Augustus Post, an original founder of the American Automobile Association, driving his 1905 White Steamer in New York City parade. In the background is Mark Twain's house. Passengers include Stanton Sickles at left and a Tammany Hall politician at right.

The first AAA road maps were published in 1905. AAA began printing hotel guides in 1917. The AAA began its School Safety Patrol Program in 1920, the first of the association's driver safety programs, which provided local schools with materials, including badges and ID cards to train and organize students into a patrol force. These programs were part of a wave of safety campaigns that sought to upend the then-common opinion that the blame for pedestrian injuries and deaths lay primarily with motorists. As summarized by historian Peter Norton, "[AAA] and other members of motordom were crafting a new kind of traffic safety effort[. ...] It claimed that pedestrians were just as responsible as motorists for injuries and accidents. It ignored claims defending the historic rights of pedestrians to the streets—in the new motor age, historic precedents were obsolete." The AAA Foundation for Traffic Safety, which conducts studies on motorist safety, was established as a separate entity in 1947.

AAA created an organization called the Racing Board, and later known as the Contest Board, in 1902 to officiate the Vanderbilt Cup international automobile race in Long Island, New York. In 1909, AAA decided to ban women from any competition they sanctioned after Joan Newton Cuneo had beaten a number of leading male drivers at a variety of different races. The Racing Board sanctioned the Indianapolis 500 and awarded national racing championships in 1905, 1916, 1920–1941, and 1946–1955. After the 1955 Le Mans disaster, AAA decided that auto racing distracted from its primary goals, and the United States Automobile Club was formed to take over the race sanctioning and officiating. In 2005, AAA re-entered racing as a sponsor of ISC-owned tracks. In 2006, AAA's foray into racing expanded when it made a three-year commitment to sponsor Roush Racing's number 6 car on the NASCAR Nextel Circuit.

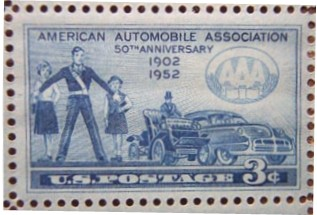
AAA 50th Anniversary US stamp, issued in 1952, promotes the School Safety Patrol.

In 1935, AAA published Sportsmanlike Driving, the first course outline for high school teachers. In 1936, AAA published the first driver education curriculum for use in high schools (also titled Sportsmanlike Driving, now known as How to Drive). AAA has updated its driver training courses throughout the years and many clubs currently offer their own driving schools, or work with other companies to provide AAA's driving curriculum. The AAA How to Drive driver education curriculum is currently in its 15th edition and the only officially endorsed curriculum of the American Driver and Traffic Safety Education Association (ADTSEA).

In 1936, AAA began a pedestrian safety program with a grant from the Automotive Safety Foundation. AAA went on to commission and publish (1938) an extensive study of pedestrian safety for the purpose of reducing pedestrian fatalities and injuries. AAA's Pedestrian Protection Program began in 1937 and focuses national attention on pedestrian safety needs by recognizing cities, counties and states that have demonstrated successful pedestrian safety programs.

AAA has also provided services to the U.S. government in times of war. During the 1940s, AAA offered its services to the Advisory Commission of the Council of National Defense in anticipation of becoming involved in World War II. AAA President Thomas P. Henry was appointed consultant in the transportation unit of the Defense Council, and AAA pledged resources, including highway information, to national defense planning efforts as it had during World War I.

Reductions in manufacturing because of the war increased the need for conservation in automobiles and their related products. AAA's efforts at conservation included supporting the manufacture of synthetic rubber in anticipation of a war-related tire/rubber shortage, urging motorists to reduce their driving speed to conserve fuel (1942); and backing a scrap rubber campaign (1942). In 1944, AAA's Keep 'em Rolling campaign sponsored a cross-country tour featuring cars equipped with synthetic tires. The tour demonstrated the reliability of tires made with synthetic rubber. In doing its part to assist in the war effort, AAA placed its mapping facilities at the disposal of the Army department; conducted motor pool driver education (1943); secured an order from the War Production Board that stopped the sale of certain anti-freeze solutions harmful to motors (1943); launched a campaign to alleviate a growing shortage of auto mechanics (1943); monitored tire and gasoline rationing (1943); and established, in cooperation with the Red Cross and military hospitals, a driver training program for veterans with artificial limbs (1944). AAA also assisted in the development of a manual on Uniform Traffic Control Devices and their operation during wartime (1942).

The end of the war brought new needs for motorists and AAA assisted by releasing the film "Traffic Jam Ahead", which outlined a practical program for postwar traffic safety, and publishing Post-war Travel Trends as a public service. In 1946, AAA launched a campaign called "Take It Easy", which was designed to reduce traffic fatalities. Subsequently, fatalities dropped 20 percent below the pre-war figure.

In the 1960s, AAA helped draft the National Traffic and Motor Vehicle Safety Act of 1966, setting safety standards for automobiles, tires, and equipment. AAA also helped draft the Highway Safety Act, specifying standards for motor vehicle inspection and registration, motorcycle safety, driver education, driver licensing, traffic courts, highway design, construction, maintenance, and traffic control devices.

During the oil crisis of the 1970s, the AAA Fuel Gauge Report was created to assist motorists in finding gas stations that had fuel and were open. AAA also began its Gas Watchers program with the endorsement of President Gerald Ford. The Gas Watchers Guide continues to be published to provide simple steps motorists can take to conserve gasoline in their daily driving.

In 1979, President Jimmy Carter appointed AAA President James B. Creal to the National Alcohol Fuels Commission. Creal also chaired a task force on gas rationing and was appointed to President Carter's National Council on Energy Efficiency. AAA representatives serving on President Carter's Alcohol Fuels Commission were requested to sign the Energy Securities Act of 1980. In addition, Creal served on the Industries Advisory Board of Congressional Travel and Tourism Caucus in the early 1980s.

In the 1980s, AAA's mapping services received significant recognition when scenic highways were identified on AAA's sheet maps for the first time. AAA maps were used in the 1984 Louisiana World Exposition where more than 13,000 full-color AAA map images were provided on an optical laser disc for demonstration of an in-car navigation device in the Chrysler Pavilion. And in 1985 the AAA North American Road Atlas was sold at retail for the first time and made the New York Times best-seller paperback list within six weeks. AAA experimented in the 1980s with the On-line Touring Information System (OTIS), which eventually was combined with other automated services under the name AAA Travel Match. The self-service terminal worked like an ATM, with rotating menus and touch-control screens that allowed users to obtain local travel information.

In congressional hearings held in 1983 on the proposed Motor Vehicle Theft Law Enforcement Act, the Michigan AAA affiliate (then known as Automobile Club of Michigan) presented testimony regarding the rapid growth in average per-vehicle costs of car theft, in support of stamping the vehicle identification number on individual car parts as a deterrent to such theft.

The AAA School Safety Patrol Program and Lifesaving Medal Award won the Presidential Citation Award for Private Sector Initiatives which honors outstanding volunteer projects in 1985. A year later, on February 4, 1986, President Ronald Reagan honored a recipient of AAA's School Safety Patrol Lifesaving Medal in his State of the Union Address.

In 1988, AAA focused its legislative efforts on the Truck & Bus Safety Regulatory Reform Act requiring interstate drivers and equipment to meet federal safety regulations. The act was signed into law in November 1988.

AAA joined government and private-sector companies—the Federal Highway Administration, Avis, General Motors and the Florida Department of Transportation—in 1990 for the Smart Car experiment, also known as the TravTek Project. This test of a computerized in-car navigation and travel information system demonstrated consumer acceptance of telematics technology that would make driving easier and reduce traffic congestion.

A new driver's education program, "Teaching Teens to Drive", was introduced by AAA in 1996 to focus on parent involvement in teen driving education. A year later, in 1997, AAA launched Licensed to Learn, a campaign to increase awareness of the need for graduated driver licensing (GDL) laws in every state. At the outset of the campaign only eight states had enacted GDL laws. Today, all 50 states and the District of Columbia have enacted some form of GDL legislation.

Research in the 1990s led AAA to pursue another issue of importance to US motorists: a transportation crisis resulting from infrastructure that had been under-funded for many years. The Crisis Ahead: America's Aging Highways and Airways research led to AAA helping to shape two pieces of landmark legislation: the Transportation Equity Act for the 21st Century (TEA-21) in 1998 and the Aviation Investment and Reform Act for the 21st Century (AIR-21) in 2000. Both laws embrace the principle that user fees charged to motorists and air travelers should be fully invested in improving and modernizing the nation's surface and air transportation infrastructures.

Because of its work in traffic safety AAA was cited in 1998 as the Clinton Administration's number one traffic safety partner by U.S. Transportation Secretary Rodney Slater. And in 2000, NHTSA presented AAA with a public service award in appreciation of AAA's leadership in the Child Passenger Safety Certification Program, which teaches how to properly install infant/child safety seats, and for its continuing efforts in graduated driver licensing.

Skyrocketing gas prices led AAA to testify before three congressional committees regarding increased gasoline prices in 2000, and to lobby to prevent Congress from repealing parts of the federal gasoline tax, which would have reduced Highway Trust Fund revenue without guaranteeing consumers any relief from high gas prices. Participating in the U.S. Department of Transportation secretary's Aviation Summit, AAA President and CEO Robert L. Darbelnet communicated AAA's stand on the aviation crisis saying that consistent underfunding of the nation's air transportation infrastructure had led to the crisis and offering a four-point plan to help turn it around. Also that year, AAA testified before Congress and the Federal Motor Carrier Safety Administration, on proposed hours-of-service regulations for commercial truck drivers and launched Share With Care, a public education campaign on safely sharing the road with trucks.

In the early 2000s (decade), AAA's focus on helping seniors stay mobile longer and more safely led to an appointment to the White House Conference on Aging. AAA promoted solutions such as senior-friendly road design, screening tools, education for seniors and their families, and supplemental transportation. Reader's Digest highlighted AAA's transportation safety agenda by focusing on the importance of road safety improvements, particularly for seniors. To help seniors become safer drivers or to recognize signs that it is time to stop driving, AAA developed Roadwise Review, a computer-based screening tool enabling older drivers to identify and address physiological changes that could affect driving.

=== Discrimination ===
During the Jim Crow era, AAA actively discriminated against African Americans, who could not join the association. Alternatives to AAA guides, such as The Negro Motorist Green Book, were written.

== Current operations ==
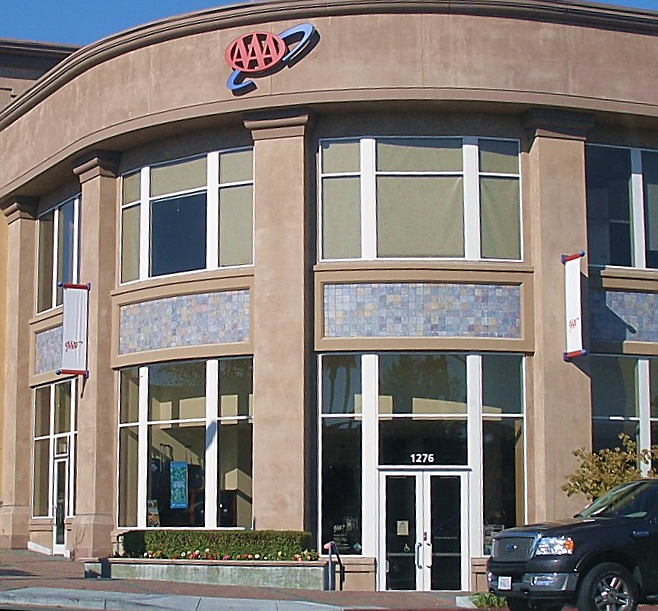
AAA's office in Walnut Creek, California

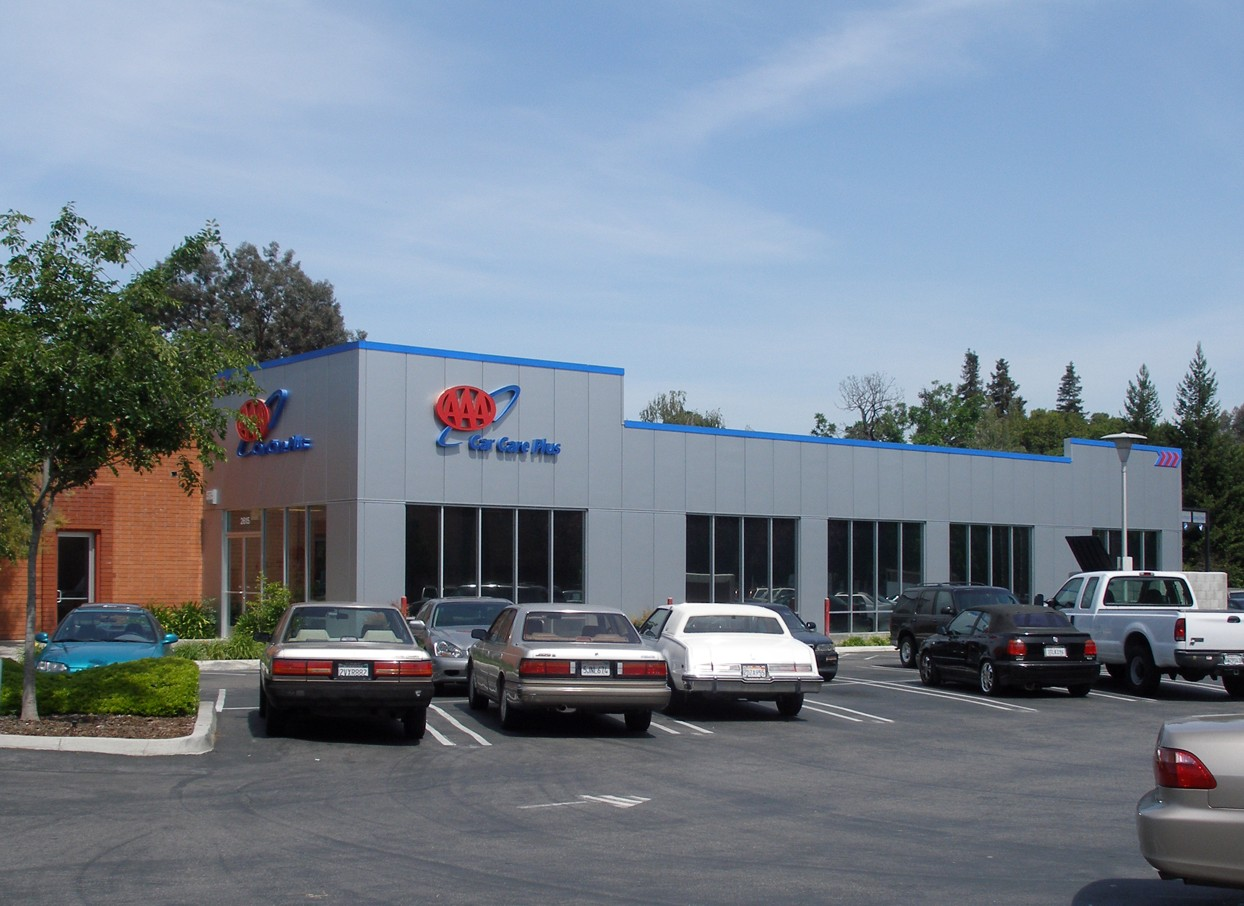
A typical AAA Car Care Plus center

Members belong to individual clubs (see List of AAA regional clubs), and the clubs in turn own AAA. The number of local clubs has decreased over time through consolidation; as late as the 1970s the membership roster included dozens of clubs that each served a single county, particularly in New York, Ohio, and Pennsylvania. Since the 1990s, numerous local clubs and regional club associations have either consolidated into or affiliated with one of five large club groups: AAA Club Alliance, AAA Mountain West Group, AAA Northeast, Automobile Club of Southern California (through its Auto Club Enterprises holding company), and Auto Club Group.

The member clubs have arranged a reciprocal service system so that members of any participating club are able to receive member services from any other affiliate club. Member dues finance all club services as well as the operations of the national organization.

The vast majority of AAA clubs have "AAA" as part of their name, although the two largest AAA clubs by membership do not: the Automobile Club of Southern California and Auto Club Group.

=== AAA Roadside Assistance ===
AAA clubs primarily provide emergency road services to its members. These services, which include towing, lockouts, winching, tire changes, automotive first aid, battery replacement, and others, are handled by private local towing companies contracted by a state AAA club. AAA sells roadside assistance for a variety of motor vehicles, including motorcycles. In some areas, AAA also offers bicycle roadside assistance. Many AAA clubs have an automotive fleet division serving large metro areas, while private towing companies cover the surplus call volume by area. Certain clubs have implemented an "on the go" diagnostic/installation automotive battery program.

=== Rating system ===
The AAA Diamond Program rates restaurants and hotels according to a "diamond" scale (one to five). It includes over 60,000 properties in the United States, Canada, Mexico and the Caribbean, amongst them nearly 27,000 hotels and more than 30,000 restaurants. The best hotels and restaurants according to AAA's criteria receive the Five Diamond Award.

=== Other auto and travel related services ===
Clubs also distribute road maps (including customized map guides for specific journeys) and travel publications (TourBook guides). Many offices sell insurance for automobile, home/renters, umbrella and life as well as provide travel agency, auto-registration and notary services. Maps, TourBook guides, and travel agent services are generally free to members. AAA also offers member discounts through its "AAA Discounts & Rewards" program. TripTik is AAA's travel planning guide and online travel planner. The print version includes road maps and other travel information, such as gas prices.

AAA is authorized by the U.S. Department of State to issue International Driving Permits in the United States, along with the National Automobile Club.

== International affiliates ==
The AAA has reciprocal arrangements with a range of international affiliates. In general, members of affiliates are offered the same benefits as members of the AAA while traveling in the United States, while AAA members are offered equivalent benefits while traveling in the territory of the affiliate.

International affiliates include:

- ARC Europe, encompassing the leading European clubs, including the Automobile Association (United Kingdom), ANWB (Netherlands), ADAC (Germany), ACI (Italy), TCS (Switzerland), TCB (Belgium), ÖAMTC (Austria) and RACE (Spain) below.
- The Canadian Automobile Association in Canada (TourBooks guides and maps of Canadian places are published by AAA, and are distributed by AAA and CAA clubs using both AAA and CAA logos).

An updated listing of International Affiliates can be found on AAA's Exchange website.

== Motorist rights ==
The AAA has weighed in over the years on numerous issues that affect motorists.

The AAA is known for occasional high-profile motorist advisories of traffic enforcement, such as when it rented a billboard to warn motorists of the speed trap town of Lawtey, Florida. It also is a supporter of the Motor Vehicle Owners' Right to Repair Act, first introduced in 2001 but which has not become law.

Additionally, the AAA supported measures that tax motorists—with the goal of strengthening infrastructure and highway maintenance—as well as supporting other measures that affect drivers:

- Virginia's now-repealed traffic citation tax because of its revenue generation potential.
- The since-repealed National Maximum Speed Limit that limited speeds to 55 mph (90 km/h).
- Supporting red light cameras.
- Lobbied in favor of speed cameras in Maryland in 2002, several years before they were actually authorized. Provisionally supporting the expansion of speed cameras in Maryland in 2009, and opposing the repeal of speed cameras in Maryland in 2013.
- Lobbied in favor of authorizing speed cameras in Indiana.
- Supporting an increase in the federal gas tax, and supporting gas tax increases at the state level such as in Virginia in 2012.
- Opposing Illinois increasing its rural speed limit from 65 to 70 mph (105–115 km/h).
- Proposing the creation of a vehicle miles traveled tax in Idaho
- Opposing the raising of tolls on bridges and tunnels in the New York Metropolitan Area.

== Environmental protection ==
In 2001, AAA launched its Great Battery Roundup to encourage motorists to recycle old automobile batteries, tires and various types of automotive fluids. Since then more than 4 million batteries have been recycled through that program and the mobile battery service. Typically holding events around Earth Day, AAA clubs often team up with other environmental organization such as the EPA and the Nature Conservancy to expand these recycling efforts.

In 2006, AAA worked with the EPA to improve the fuel economy information provided to new car buyers by vehicle manufacturers. Using several different types of tests, AAA recreated real-world driving conditions to illustrate the difference in fuel economy, and the EPA incorporated AAA's testing into their new procedures. The more accurate testing resulted in a reduction of miles per gallon claims between 5 and 25 percent, beginning with 2008 model year vehicles.

As fuel prices rise, consumers often see increased marketing of fuel additives as a way to boost fuel economy. AAA has tested many of these products and has never found one that provides significant savings for consumers. AAA has warned consumers repeatedly against products that make such claims and encourages motorists to develop instead fuel-conserving driving habits, such as reducing the weight of the vehicle by removing unnecessary objects from the trunk, instituting smooth stops and starts, and reducing their speed.

It is generally understood that the benefits of fuel conservation for consumers include financial savings, improved road safety and a healthier environment. To assist motorists in becoming more conscious about saving fuel, AAA published its first Gas Watcher's Guide in the 1970s during the oil crisis. The annual guide provides information on a variety of factors that affect fuel economy, such as modifying driving behavior, keeping a vehicle well maintained, choosing the proper fuel, and choosing the most fuel-efficient vehicle for a family's needs.

Over the years, AAA has encouraged consumers to use public transportation by including these transportation options in its travel guidebooks. AAA has also called on government to invest adequately in a multi-modal transportation system that is widely accessible and affordable. In comments to the National Journal, AAA President and CEO Robert L. Darbelnet said that funding for high-speed rail from the American Recovery and Reinvestment Act is a "drop in the bucket" of what is needed, and that those funds would be well spent if, going forward, additional sources of investment could be identified.

In addition to encouraging fuel efficiency and conservation, AAA and other organizations initiated National Car Care Month during the 1980s to publicize the fact that poorly maintained vehicles contribute to excessive energy consumption and air pollution. AAA works in cooperation with businesses, civic groups, the government and the media in promoting and coordinating this annual event, held each October.

In 1992, AAA launched a popular ecotourism promotion called Freedom's Way. With support from agencies such as the National Park Service, U.S. Fish and Wildlife Service, Environmental Protection Agency and others, AAA produced travel tips and public service messages encouraging travelers to help protect America's scenic areas and respect the environment. Topics included reducing congestion and pollution, conserving energy, disposing of litter and enjoying wildlife at a distance. The prevailing theme was that heavy use or abuse of a site damages the quality of the experience for everyone and sometimes even results in the closure of parks and recreation areas. The message was simple but effective.

In 2016, AAA introduced a new website focused on hybrid and electric vehicles, and offers mobile charging aid for stranded EVs, similar to fuel-starved piston cars.

AAA clubs have also been a part of the organization's century-long environmental advocacy efforts including:

- In 1919, alarmed by rapid destruction of California's giant redwood trees at the hands of commercial loggers, AAA's California State Automobile Association launched a multiyear publicity and lobbying campaign. Working with the Save the Redwoods League, CSAA continued promoting awareness and, in 1927, a bill creating a state park system that protected redwoods became law.
- AAA Washington works with the state's Department of Ecology to assist with programs that help minimize the impact of automobile emissions, and the club's fleet services operations were named a county EnviroStar business in recognition of environment-friendly practices.
- Since 1991, the California State Automobile Association and Bay Area Air Quality Management District have co-sponsored a Spare the Air campaign designed to reduce traffic congestion and improve air quality. CSAA also sponsors the AAA Outdoor Corps, a group of employee volunteers who clean beaches, clear park trails and plant trees in wetlands.
- AAA Michigan sponsors Detroit Clean Sweep, an ongoing program involving club employees who help promote a cleaner environment through volunteer activities such as collecting litter. In addition, the club's Freeway Courtesy Patrol vans cruise local roadways to assist motorists and help reduce congestion.
- AAA Mid-Atlantic was lead sponsor of a U.S. Department of Transportation Livable Communities workshop in Philadelphia that brought together bicycle, pedestrian, transit and safety groups regarding safe and efficient travel. In honor of Earth Day, AAA Mid-Atlantic planted trees in America's National Forests, literally, on behalf of their members who took advantage of AAA Mid-Atlantic's Mobile Battery Service program. For every member who called to have a new car battery installed and the old battery recycled, a tree was planted in the national forest. The tree plantings were made possible through the Arbor Day Foundation, a non-profit conservation and education organization.
- AAA Oregon/Idaho is closely associated with Stop Oregon Litter and Vandalism, and provides TripTik-style guides for annual beach clean-ups and habitat mitigation projects.
- AAA Lancaster County earned an Outstanding Partner Award from the Pennsylvania Department of Environmental Protection for its Ozone Action Program. The club also belongs to an advisory committee that promotes multiple modes of transportation systems that conform to federal air quality standards.
- The Auto Club of Southern California helped establish the Southern California Rideshare program. The club has supported dozens of transit projects that provide an appropriate benefit for their expense, including commuter transit services in the Inland Empire.

=== Criticism ===
Despite its work promoting environmental responsibility in the automotive and transportation arenas, AAA's lobbying positions have sometimes been perceived to be hostile to mass transit and environmental interests. In 2006, the Automobile Club of Southern California worked against Prop. 87. The proposition would have established a "$4 billion program to reduce petroleum consumption (in California) by 25 percent, with research and production incentives for alternative energy, alternative energy vehicles, energy efficient technologies, and for education and training."

Daniel Becker, director of Sierra Club's global warming and energy program, described AAA as "a lobbyist for more roads, more pollution, and more gas guzzling." He observed that among other lobbying activities, AAA issued a press release critical of the Clean Air Act, stating that it would "threaten the personal mobility of millions of Americans and jeopardize needed funds for new highway construction and safety improvements." "AAA spokespeople have criticized open-space measures and opposed U.S. EPA restrictions on smog, soot, and tailpipe emissions." "The club spent years battling stricter vehicle-emissions standards in Maryland, whose air, because of emissions and pollution from states upwind, is among the nation's worst." As of 2017, AAA continues to lobby against public transportation projects.

=== Response ===
While AAA's work on behalf of motorists and travelers seems at odds sometimes with its environmental stance, awareness of the underlying issues has led to greater understanding. For instance, in 2009, AAA asked the EPA not to increase the allowable ethanol content in gasoline from 10 percent to 15 percent, citing several concerns affecting vehicle emissions, engine performance, system component damage, and vehicle warranty agreements, among others. AAA said that more research needed to be done on the potential harmful effects prior to increasing the ethanol content in fuel.

In another instance, AAA supported the overall goal of the Clean Air Act, but objected to several specific provisions in the legislation, requesting clarification of the proposed state inspection and maintenance program provision and asking that the implementation guidelines be fully evaluated prior to enactment. According to a Washington Times article, which referred to research by Energy & Environment Analysis Inc., tightening federal emissions standards had led to a role reversal for the automobile, making it less of a contributor to smog. Instead, stationary emission sources such as factories, as well as heavy and utility vehicles were more of a threat to air quality and would be appropriate targets in the battle against smog. "However, by primarily emphasizing vehicle regulations in the 1970s and ignoring gasoline regulations EPA actually caused fuels to become dirtier, effectively undermining a significant portion of any gains achieved through the tighter control of vehicles."

And more recently, although AAA supports the manufacture and use of hybrid vehicles, research by the British Columbia Automobile Association in 2010 shows that they do not result in significant financial savings for consumers, although they are often marketed that way.

In response to these concerns, several competing organizations have emerged, including Better World Club. These organizations generally provide similar roadside assistance, trip planning and other services, in an environmentally friendly manner. This includes discounts for fuel-efficient vehicles and donations to environmental organizations.

Also as a response to the critics, the California State Automobile Association, a branch of AAA, set up a booth at the San Francisco International Auto Show to raise awareness regarding plug-in hybrid vehicles.

== List of regional clubs ==
AAA regional clubs
Club	Headquarters	Founded	Territory	Insurance	Magazine	Website
AAA Northern New England (Note: AAA Texas, AAA New Mexico, AAA Hawaii, and AAA Alabama are part of the Auto Club of Southern California Enterprise (ACE). ACE has affiliation agreements with AAA Northern New England, AAA Missouri, AAA East Central, and AAA Tidewater)	Portland, Maine		Maine, New Hampshire (except for Salem), and Vermont	Auto Club Enterprises Insurance Group	Northern New England Journey	northernnewengland.aaa.com
AAA Northeast (Note: The Automobile Club of Rhode Island merged with the Bancroft Automobile Club (based in Worcester, Mass.) in 1987 to form the AAA South Central New England. AAA Massachusetts (formerly the Boston Automobile Club) joined in 1996, and AAA Berkshire County in July 2004 to form the present AAA Southern New England. AAA Merrimack Valley merged with AAA Southern New England in 2011, and began issuing membership cards with the Southern New England club code in February 2012. AAA Southern New England acquired AAA New York and the AAA New Jersey Auto Club (AAA North Jersey) to form AAA Northeast in 2014.) (Note: AAA Northeast and AAA Carolinas are part of AAA Motor Club Holdings)	Providence, Rhode Island	1900	Rhode Island; Connecticut: New Haven, Fairfield, and Litchfield counties Massachusetts; Portions of New Jersey, including Florham Park, as well as Essex, Morris, Union, Bergen, Hudson, and Passaic counties New York State: Long Island, the five boroughs of New York City, and Westchester, Rockland, Sullivan, Ulster, Dutchess, Orange, Putnam, Chenango, Delaware, Otsego, Schoharie, and Herkimer counties, and parts of Lewis, Madison, and Oneida counties	AAA Southern New England Insurance Company	Your AAA	northeast.aaa.com
AAA Club Alliance (Note: AAA Mid-Atlantic acquired AAA Allied Group in 2015 to form AAA Club Alliance, which also includes AAA Oklahoma/South Dakota)	Wilmington, Delaware	1900	Greater Hartford, CT Area, Cincinnati Tri-State Area, Miami County, OH, Greater Dayton, OH Area, Northwest Ohio, AAA Blue Grass & Bluefield Regions, Southern West Virginia, Kansas, Oklahoma, South Dakota, Delaware, Maryland, Washington DC, and parts of Virginia, Pennsylvania, and New Jersey.	ACA Club Insurance Agency, Inc.	AAA World	ClubAlliance.aaa.com
AAA Hudson Valley	Albany, New York		New York State: Albany County, Villages of Waterford and Stillwater, City of Mechanicville in Saratoga County and all of Rensselaer, Greene, and Columbia counties	AAA Hudson Valley Insurance Agency	AAA every day	hudsonvalley.aaa.com
AAA Northway	Schenectady, New York		New York State: Broome, Tioga, Chemung, Clinton, Essex, Franklin, Fulton, Hamilton, Montgomery, Schenectady, Saratoga, Warren, and Washington counties	CSAA Insurance Group	AAA Now!	northway.aaa.com
AAA Western and Central New York	Buffalo, New York		New York State: Allegany, Cattaraugus, Cayuga, Chautauqua, Cortland, Erie, Genesee, Jefferson, Lewis, Livingston, Madison, Monroe, Niagara, Oneida, Onondaga, Ontario, Oswego, Schuyler, Seneca, Steuben, St. Lawrence, Tompkins, Wayne, Wyoming, and Yates counties	CSAA Insurance Group	Member Connection	westerncentralny.aaa.com
AAA South Jersey	Voorhees, New Jersey		New Jersey: Camden, Cumberland, Gloucester, and Salem counties	CSAA Insurance Group	SJ First	southjersey.aaa.com
AAA East Central (East Penn Region)	Allentown, Pennsylvania		Pennsylvania: All of Lehigh County and parts of Bucks, Carbon, Chester, Montgomery, and Northampton counties	Auto Club Enterprises Insurance Group	AAA Motorist	eastcentral.aaa.com
AAA Northampton County	Easton, Pennsylvania	1918	Pennsylvania: Greater Easton area, the eastern municipalities and townships (Bethlehem, Bushkill, Forks, Lower and Upper Nazareth, Lower and Upper Mt. Bethel, Lower Saucon, Moore, and Williams) in Northampton County, and northeastern Bucks County		AAA Now!	northampton.aaa.com
AAA North Penn	Scranton, Pennsylvania		Pennsylvania: Lackawanna, Monroe, Lycoming, Wayne, Bradford, Susquehanna, Pike, Tioga, Wyoming, Potter, and Sullivan counties	CSAA Insurance Group	AAA North Penn News	northpenn.aaa.com
AAA Central Penn	Harrisburg, Pennsylvania		Pennsylvania: Adams, Cumberland, Dauphin, Huntingdon, Juniata, Lancaster, Lebanon, Mifflin, and Perry counties	CSAA Insurance Group	AAA Now!	centralpenn.aaa.com
AAA Mid States	York, Pennsylvania		Pennsylvania: York, Franklin, Fulton, Bedford, Clearfield, Cambria, Clinton, Centre, northern Somerset, and western Cumberland counties ; Ohio: Hancock County	CSAA Insurance Group	Home & Away	/www.midstates.aaa.com/
AAA Schuylkill County	Pottsville, Pennsylvania		Pennsylvania: Schuylkill County	CSAA Insurance Group	AAA Now!	ww1.aaa.com
AAA Tidewater Virginia	Virginia Beach, Virginia		Hampton Roads area of Virginia	Auto Club Enterprises Insurance Group	Tidewater Traveler	www.tidewater.aaa.com
AAA Alabama	Birmingham, Alabama		Alabama	Auto Club Enterprises Insurance Group	Alabama Journey	www.aaa.com
AAA East Central (Kentucky Region)	Louisville, Kentucky		Kentucky: Adair, Allen, Anderson, Ballard, Breckinridge, Bullitt, Butler, Caldwell, Calloway, Carlisle, Casey, Christian, Clinton, Crittenden, Cumberland, Daviess, Edmonson, Fulton, Graves, Grayson, Green, Hancock, Hardin, Henderson, Henry, Hickman, Hopkins, Jefferson, LaRue, Livingston, Logan, Lyon, Marion, Marshall, McCracken, McLean, Meade, Metcalfe, Monroe, Muhlenberg, Nelson, Ohio, Oldham, Russell, Shelby, Simpson, Spencer, Taylor, Todd, Trigg, Trimble, Union, Warren, Washington, Wayne, and Webster counties		AAA Motorist	eastcentral.aaa.com
AAA East Central (Note: The Cleveland Automobile Club (founded in 1900) merged with the Alliance Automobile Club, the Tuscarawas County Automobile Club, and others to form the Ohio Motorist Association in 1978. The Ohio Motorist Association (based in Cleveland) merged into AAA East Central on January 1, 2005.)	Pittsburgh, Pennsylvania	1900	New York State: Orleans County; Ohio: Adams, Ashland, Ashtabula, Athens, Columbiana, Cuyahoga, Fayette, Gallia, Geauga, Highland, Hocking, Huron, Jackson, Jefferson, Lake, Lawrence, Lorain, Mahoning, Meigs, Noble, Pike, Portage, Ross, Scioto, Trumbull, Tuscarawas, Vinton, and Washington counties. Parts of Stark County. Pennsylvania: Allegheny, Armstrong, Beaver, Blair, Butler, Cameron, Clarion, Crawford, Elk, Erie, Fayette, Forest, Greene, Indiana, Jefferson, Lawrence, McKean, Mercer, Northumberland, Snyder, Union, Venango, Warren, Washington, and Westmoreland counties. Parts of Bucks, Cambria, Carbon, Montgomery, Northampton, and Somerset counties. West Virginia: Barbour, Berkeley, Braxton, Brooke, Cabell, Calhoun, Doddridge, Gilmer, Grant, Hampshire, Hancock, Hardy, Harrison, Jackson, Jefferson, Lewis, Lincoln, Logan, Marion, Marshall, Mason, Mineral, Mingo, Monongalia, Morgan, Ohio, Pendleton, Pleasants, Pocahontas, Preston, Putnam, Randolph, Ritchie, Roane, Taylor, Tucker, Tyler, Upshur, Wayne, Webster, Wetzel, Wirt, and Wood counties		AAA Motorist	eastcentral.aaa.com
AAA Shelby County	Sidney, Ohio		Ohio: Shelby county		AAA Now!	ww1.aaa.com
Auto Club Group (Note: The Auto Club Group, based in Dearborn, Michigan, operates AAA Michigan, AAA Minnesota/Iowa, AAA Nebraska, AAA North Dakota, AAA Wisconsin, Auto Club South (AAA Florida, AAA Georgia, and AAA Tennessee), and the Chicago Motor Club. AAA East Tennessee merged with Auto Club South's West and Middle Tennessee operations on May 1, 2012 to form AAA Tennessee.)	Dearborn, Michigan		Michigan; Wisconsin; Iowa; Minnesota; Nebraska; North Dakota; North Carolina and South Carolina; Colorado; Florida, Georgia, Tennessee, Puerto Rico; Bristol, Virginia; Illinois: Adams, Boone, Brown, Bureau, Carroll, Cass, Champaign, Christian, Clark, Clay, Coles, Cook, Crawford, Cumberland, De Witt, DeKalb, Douglas, DuPage, Edgar, Effingham, Fayette, Ford, Fulton, Grundy, Hancock, Henderson, Henry, Iroquois, Jasper, Jo Daviess, Kane, Kankakee, Kendall, Knox, La Salle, Lake, Lawrence, Lee, Livingston, Logan, Macon, Macoupin, Marshall, Mason, McDonough, McHenry, McLean, Menard, Mercer, Montgomery, Morgan, Moultrie, Ogle, Peoria, Piatt, Pike, Putnam, Richland, Rock Island, Sangamon, Schuyler, Scott, Shelby, Stark, Stephenson, Tazewell, Vermillion, Warren, Whiteside, Will, Winnebago, and Woodford counties; Indiana: Adams, Allen, Blackford, Cass, DeKalb, Elkhart, Fulton, Grant, Huntington, Jay, Kosciusko, LaPorte, Lagrange, Lake, Marshall, Miami, Noble, Porter, Randolph, St. Joseph, Steuben, Wabash, Wells, and Whitley counties.	Various		acg.aaa.com
Hoosier Motor Club	Indianapolis, Indiana		Indiana: Bartholomew, Benton, Boone, Brown, Carroll, Clark, Clay, Clinton, Decatur, Delaware, Fayette, Floyd, Fountain, Greene, Hamilton, Hancock, Harrison, Hendricks, Henry, Howard, Jackson, Jasper, Jennings, Johnson, Lawrence, Madison, Marion, Monroe, Montgomery, Morgan, Newton, Orange, Owen, Parke, Pulaski, Putnam, Rush, Scott, Shelby, Starke, Sullivan, Tippecanoe, Tipton, Union, Vermillion, Vigo, Warren, Washington, and Wayne counties	CSAA Insurance Group	Home & Away	hoosier.aaa.com
AAA Missouri	St. Louis, Missouri		Missouri, Arkansas, Louisiana, Mississippi; Kansas: Atchison, Brown, Doniphan, Johnson, and Wyandotte counties Illinois: Alexander, Bond, Calhoun, Clinton, Edwards, Franklin, Gallatin, Greene, Hamilton, Hardin, Jackson, Jefferson, Jersey, Johnson, Madison, Marion, Massac, Monroe, Perry, Pope, Pulaski, Randolph, St. Clair, Saline, Union, Wabash, Washington, Wayne, White, and Williamson counties Indiana: Crawford, Daviess, Dubois, Gibson, Knox, Martin, Perry, Pike, Posey, Spencer, Vanderburgh, and Warrick counties Texarkana, Texas	Auto Club Enterprises Insurance Group	Midwest Traveler/Southern Traveler	autoclubmo.aaa.com
AAA Texas	Coppell, Texas		Texas: Includes Austin, Round Rock, San Antonio, Allen, Frisco, Plano, Dallas, Garland, Lewisville, Denton, Flower Mound, Irving, Fort Worth, Arlington, Amarillo, El Paso, Lubbock, Midland, and many more. Excludes Texarkana	Auto Club Enterprises Insurance Group	Texas Journey	AAA Texas
AAA Mountain West Group (Note: AAA Arizona and AAA MountainWest merged operations with AAA Northern California, Nevada & Utah.)	Walnut Creek, California		California: Alameda, Alpine, Amador, Butte, Calaveras, Colusa, Contra Costa, Del Norte, El Dorado, Fresno, Glenn, Humboldt, Kings, Lake, Lassen, Madera, Marin, Mariposa, Mendocino, Merced, Modoc, Monterey, Napa, Nevada, Placer, Plumas, Sacramento, San Benito, San Francisco, San Joaquin, San Mateo, Santa Clara, Santa Cruz, Shasta, Sierra, Siskiyou, Solano, Sonoma, Stanislaus, Sutter, Tehama, Trinity, Tuolumne, Yolo, and Yuba counties Nevada and Utah; Arizona; and Alaska, Montana, and Wyoming	CSAA Insurance Group	Via	mwg.aaa.com
Automobile Club of Southern California	Costa Mesa, California	1900	California: Inyo, Imperial, Kern, Los Angeles, Mono, Orange, Riverside, San Bernardino, San Diego, San Luis Obispo, Santa Barbara, Tulare, and Ventura counties	Auto Club Enterprises Insurance Group	Westways	calif.aaa.com
AAA New Mexico	Albuquerque, New Mexico		New Mexico	Auto Club Enterprises Insurance Group	New Mexico Journey	newmexico.aaa.com
AAA Oregon/Idaho	Portland, Oregon		Oregon and southern Idaho	CSAA Insurance Group	VIA	oregon.aaa.com
AAA Washington	Bellevue, Washington	1904	Washington and northern Idaho		Journey	wa.aaa.com
AAA Hawaii	Honolulu, Hawaii		Hawaii	Auto Club Enterprises Insurance Group	AAA Hawai'i	hawaii.aaa.com

== See also ==
- AAA (disambiguation)
- AAA Travel High School Challenge
- Alliance Internationale de Tourisme
- Canadian Automobile Association
- Automobile Club of America
- United States Auto Club
