= AAA Northern California, Nevada & Utah =

U.S. motor club

- Headquarters: Walnut Creek, California
- Region served: Northern California, Nevada, Utah
- Parent organization: American Automobile Association
- Website: https://mwg.aaa.com/

AAA Northern California, Nevada and Utah (AAA NCNU), formerly known as the California State Automobile Association (CSAA), is one of the largest motor clubs in the American Automobile Association (AAA) National Federation. As the name states, it serves members in Northern California, Nevada, and Utah. It is headquartered in Walnut Creek, California.

== History ==
Counties of California covered by the Automobile Club of Southern California (red) and AAA NCNU (blue)

The California State Automobile Association traces its history to a 1900 meeting of car buffs in San Francisco's Cliff House.

Recognizing the need for better roads (America had very few paved roadways outside of cities), signage, and more friendly laws, those car owners formed the Automobile Club of California (ACC) to deal with barriers that hindered acceptance of the auto throughout the state.

The club's efforts began to pay off in 1905, when the legislature passed a set of uniform regulations governing the use of motor vehicles on California highways. This established the state, rather than individual local jurisdictions, as the authority on motor vehicle law and did away with a jumble of local regulations.

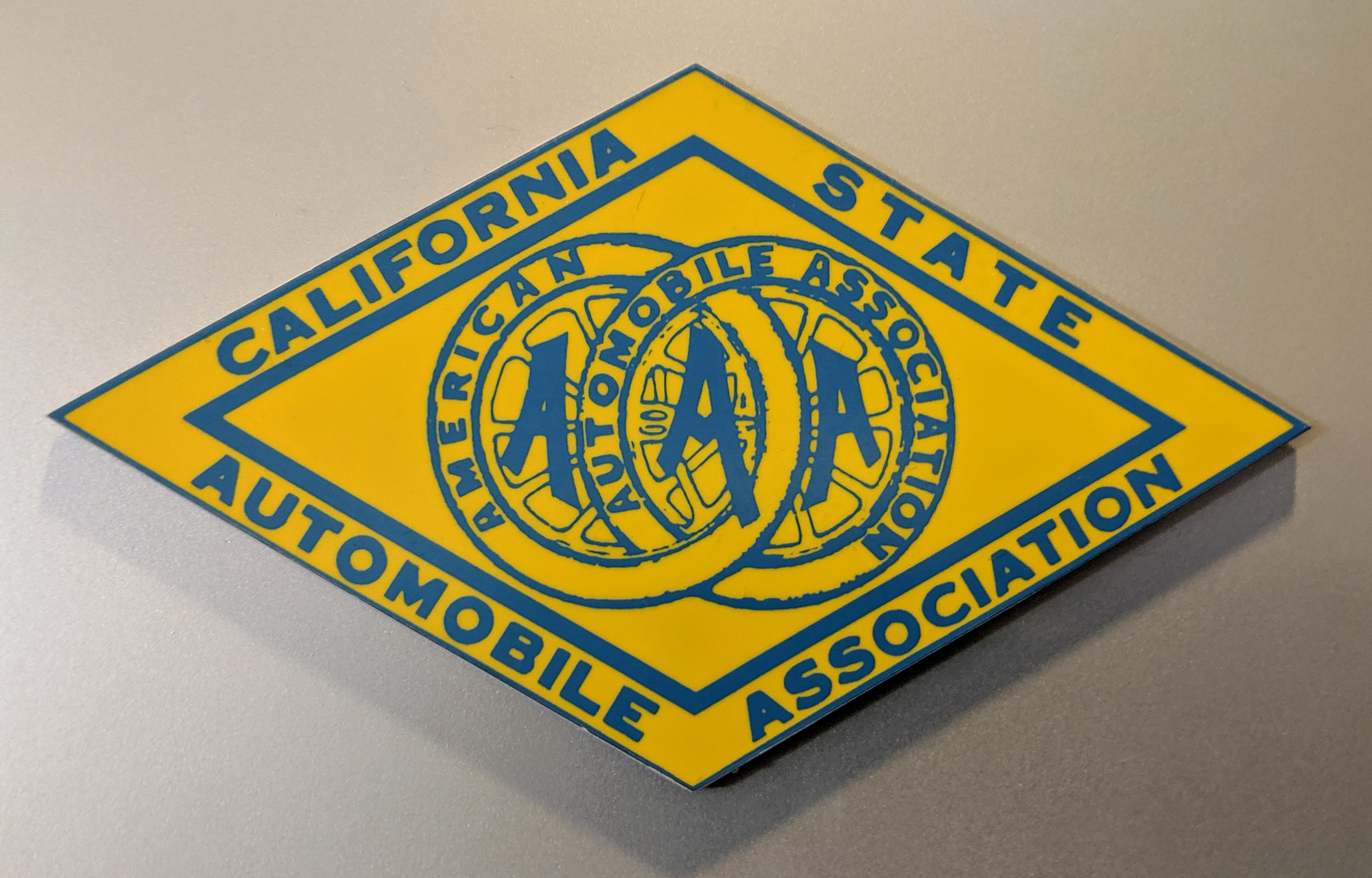
The 1907 logo of the California State Automobile Association

1907 was the year that California State Automobile Association officially incorporated in California as Non-Profit Mutual Benefit Corporation. Affiliation with the American Automobile Association (AAA), however, did not occur until after AAA itself officially incorporated in 1910 in the State of Connecticut. The new club's (stated) focus was “Good Roads and Just Legislation.”

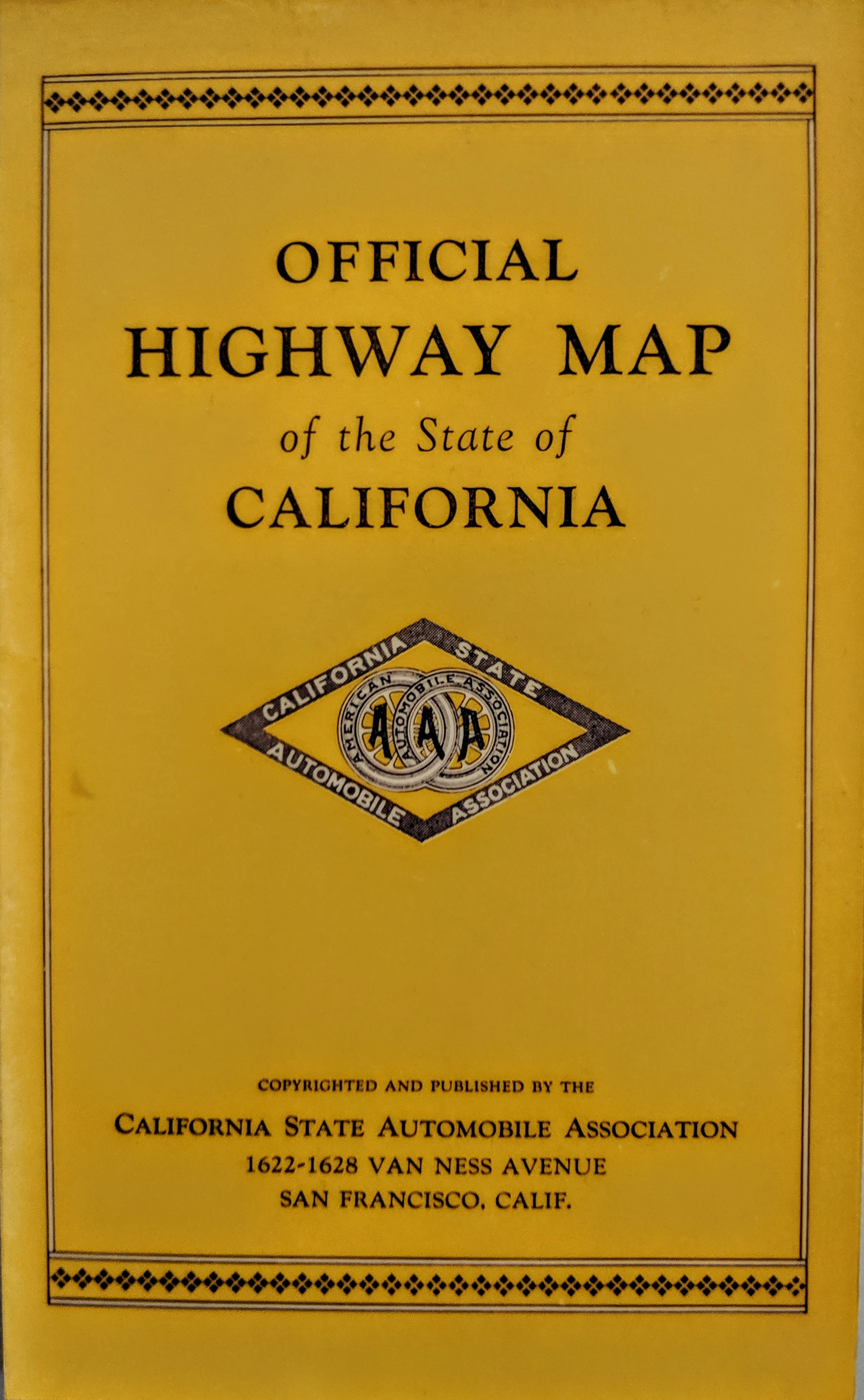
1909 CSAA highway map

CSAA sent teams of cartographers to survey California's roads for the production of maps, with the first ones produced in 1909. The organization also helped post thousands of porcelain-on-steel traffic signs throughout the state and continued to do so until the State of California took over the task in 1947.

CSAA began to offer automobile insurance in 1913 and homeowner's insurance in 1974.

In 1933, CSAA opened its first office in Nevada, and thereafter became the designated AAA affiliate in that state. In 1994, CSAA acquired the Automobile Club of Utah.

In 2005, CSAA and AAA Arizona announced they would affiliate under a shared holding company, AAA Club Affiliates. By 2006, AAA Club Affiliates counted AAA MountainWest, AAA Oklahoma/South Dakota, and the Hoosier Motor Club as members. AAA Northern Ohio joined in 2008. AAA Club Affiliates merged with AAA Mid-Atlantic in 2010 to form AAA Club Partners.

CSAA announced in 2007 that it was going to move its headquarters to Station Landing, a new office building in unincorporated Walnut Creek. The building was completed in 2009.

After doing business as California State Automobile Association for more than 103 years, the name was changed to AAA Northern California, Nevada & Utah, or AAA NCNU. This change took effect in February 2011, which was reflected in their December 15, 2010 corporate amendments filed with the California Secretary of State.

In 2010, there was a reported split of the insurance and auto club operations, with the auto club remaining a non-profit mutual benefit corporation, while the insurance side became a for-profit entity. The following year, the auto club moved its headquarters to Emeryville.

In 2013, the insurance company changed its name to CSAA Insurance Group, a AAA Insurer. In April 2017, the auto-club company moved its headquarters from Emeryville to the Treat Towers in Walnut Creek, just a block away from the insurance group.

== See also ==
- Automobile Club of Southern California
