= 1971 Ohio State Buckeyes football team =

American college football season

1971 Ohio State Buckeyes football
- Conference: Big Ten Conference
- Record: 6–4 (5–3 Big Ten)
- Head coach: Woody Hayes (21st season)
- Defensive coordinator: George Hill (1st season)
- MVP: Tom DeLeone
- Captains: Tom DeLeone; Harry Howard
- Home stadium: Ohio Stadium

1971 Big Ten Conference football standings
	Conf.					Overall
Team	W		L		T	W		L		T
No. 6 Michigan $	8	–	0	–	0	11	–	1	–	0
Northwestern	6	–	3	–	0	7	–	4	–	0
Ohio State	5	–	3	–	0	6	–	4	–	0
Michigan State	5	–	3	–	0	6	–	5	–	0
Illinois	5	–	3	–	0	5	–	6	–	0
Wisconsin	3	–	5	–	0	4	–	6	–	1
Minnesota	3	–	5	–	0	4	–	7	–	0
Purdue	3	–	5	–	0	3	–	7	–	0
Indiana	2	–	6	–	0	3	–	8	–	0
Iowa	1	–	8	–	0	1	–	10	–	0
$ – Conference champion; Rankings from AP Poll

The 1971 Ohio State Buckeyes football team was an American football team that represented the Ohio State University as a member of the Big Ten Conference during the 1971 Big Ten season. In their 21st season under head coach Woody Hayes, the Buckeyes compiled a 6–4 record (5–3 in conference games), finished in a three-way tie for third place in the Big Ten, and outscored opponents by a total of 224 to 120. An early season loss to No. 10 Colorado snapped the Buckeyes' 19-game home winning streak. The Buckeyes ended the season with three consecutive losses for the first time since 1924 and were unranked in the final AP and UPI polls.

The Buckeyes gained an average of 211.6 rushing yards and 102.6 passing yards per game. On defense, they allowed 164.7 rushing yards and 118.2 passing yards per game. The team's statistical leaders included quarterback Don Lamka (718 passing yards, 50.5% completion percentage), tailback Rick Galbos (540 rushing yards, 3.8 yards per carry), right end Dick Wakefield (31 receptions for 432 yards), and linebacker Vic Koegel with 61 solo tackles and 126 total tackles. Lamka and kicker Fred Schram each scored 48 points to lead the team in scoring. Center Tom DeLeone received first-team All-America honors from, among others, the UPI and NEA. Five Ohio State players won first-team honors on the 1971 All-Big Ten Conference football team: DeLeone; offensive tackle Rick Simon; defensive tackle George Hasenohrl; and linebackers Stan White and Randy Gradishar.

The team played its home games at Ohio Stadium in Columbus, Ohio. Home attendance totaled 506,699 in six games, an average of 84,449 per game. This was the first season the field had artificial turf (the turf was scheduled to be installed for the 1970 season, but was delayed). The AstroTurf field remained in place through the 1989 season.

This was the first season the Buckeyes played ten regular season games, six years after the other nine members of the Big Ten added a 10th game. Ohio State and Purdue were the only Big Ten schools not to play an 11th game, which was first permitted by the NCAA in 1970.

== Schedule ==
Date	Time	Opponent	Rank	Site	TV	Result	Attendance	Source
September 11	1:30 p.m.	Iowa	No. 11	Ohio Stadium; Columbus, OH		W 52–21	75,596	
September 25	1:30 p.m.	No. 10 Colorado*	No. 6	Ohio Stadium; Columbus, OH		L 14–20	85,586	
October 2	1:32 p.m.	California*	No. 14	Ohio Stadium; Columbus, OH		W 35–3	86,280	
October 9	2:30 p.m.	at Illinois	No. 15	Memorial Stadium; Champaign, IL (Illibuck)		W 24–10	53,555	
October 16	1:30 p.m.	at Indiana	No. 13	Memorial Stadium; Bloomington, IN		W 27–7	50,812	
October 23	1:30 p.m.	Wisconsin	No. 12	Ohio Stadium; Columbus, OH	ABC	W 31–6	86,559	
October 30	2:30 p.m.	at Minnesota	No. 10	Memorial Stadium; Minneapolis, MN		W 14–12	36,281	
November 6	1:30 p.m.	Michigan State	No. 9	Ohio Stadium; Columbus, OH		L 10–17	86,616	
November 13	1:30 p.m.	Northwestern	No. 16	Ohio Stadium; Columbus, OH		L 10–14	86,062	
November 20	1:30 p.m.	at No. 3 Michigan		Michigan Stadium; Ann Arbor, MI (rivalry)		L 7–10	104,016	
*Non-conference game; Rankings from AP Poll released prior to the game; All times are in Eastern time

== Game summaries ==
=== Iowa ===
Team	1	2	3	4	Total
Iowa	0	7	7	7	21
• Ohio St	17	7	14	14	52

- Date: September 11
- Location: Ohio Stadium, Columbus, Ohio
- Game start: 1:32p.m. EST
- Elapsed time: 2:36
- Game attendance: 75,596
- Game weather: Rain, 67 °F (19 °C)

Scoring summary
Q1	13:07	OHST	Schram 39-yard field goal	Ohio St 3–0
Q1	5:39	OHST	Bledsoe 3-yard run (Schram kick)	Ohio St 10–0
Q1	4:55	OHST	Lamka 21-yard run (Schram kick)	Ohio St 17–0
Q2	11:37	IOWA	Holmes 1-yard run (Kokolus kick)	Ohio St 17–7
Q2	7:41	OHST	Bledsoe 11-yard run (Schram kick)	Ohio St 24–7
Q3	13:26	IOWA	Cabalka 10-yard pass from Sunderman (Kokolus kick)	Ohio St 24–14
Q3	10:42	OHST	Lamka 19-yard run (Schram kick)	Ohio St 31–14
Q3	5:20	OHST	Lamka 6-yard run (Schram kick)	Ohio St 38–14
Q4	12:14	OHST	Lamka 1-yard run (Schram kick)	Ohio St 45–14
Q4	6:55	OHST	Lippert 10-yard run (Schram kick)	Ohio St 52–14
Q4	3:02	IOWA	Mitchell 6-yard run (Kokolus kick)	Ohio St 52–21

Don Lamka, who spent the last two seasons as a reserve defensive back, made his debut at quarterback with 211 total yards and four touchdowns.

=== Colorado ===
Colorado Buffaloes at Ohio State Buckeyes

Quarter	1	2	3	4	Total
Colorado	6	7	0	7	20
Ohio St	0	0	0	14	14

at Ohio Stadium, Columbus, Ohio

- Date: September 25, 1971
- Game time: 1:30 p.m.
- Game weather: Cloudy, 64 °F (18 °C)
- Game attendance: 85,586

Game information

First quarter

- COL – Ken Johnson 6-yard run (kick failed), 6:51. Colorado 6–0. Drive: 10 plays, 71 yards.

Second quarter

- COL – Cliff Branch 68-yard punt return (J.B. Dean kick), 10:49. Colorado 13–0.

Fourth quarter

- OSU – Don Lamka 1-yard run (Fred Schram kick), 4:28. Colorado 13–7. Drive: 7 plays, 43 yards.
- COL – Ken Johnson 39-yard run (J.B. Dean kick), 3:30. Colorado 20–7. Drive: 3 plays, 45 yards.
- OSU – Rick Middleton 14-yard pass from Don Lamka (Fred Schram kick), 2:11. Colorado 20–14. Drive: 5 plays, 77 yards.

Top passers

- COL – Ken Johnson – 4/9, 97 yards, 2 INT
- OSU – Don Lamka – 20/33, 255 yards, TD

Top rushers

- COL – Charlie Davis – 18 rushes, 135 yards
- OSU – Don Lamka – 23 rushes, 60 yards, TD

Top receivers

- COL – Willie Nichols – 2 receptions, 61 yards
- OSU – Dick Wakefield – 11 receptions, 172 yards

=== California ===
Team	1	2	3	4	Total
California	0	3	0	0	3
• Ohio St	14	0	0	21	35

- Date: October 2
- Location: Ohio Stadium, Columbus, Ohio
- Game start: 1:32p.m. EST
- Elapsed time: 2:28
- Game attendance: 86,280
- Game weather: Clear, 85 °F (29 °C)

Scoring summary
Q1	6:17	OHST	Lamka 4 yard run (Schram kick)	OHST 7–0
Q1	1:50	OHST	Bradshaw 12 yard run (Schram kick)	OHST 14–0
Q2	7:20	CAL	Wersching 47 yard field goal	OHST 14–3
Q4	13:02	OHST	Hare 40 yard run (Schram kick)	OHST 21–3
Q4	9:39	OHST	Bradshaw 4 yard run (Schram kick)	OHST 28–3
Q4	0:33	OHST	Eggers 1 yard run (Schram kick)	OHST 35–3

=== Illinois ===
Team	1	2	3	4	Total
• Ohio St	14	0	10	0	24
Illinois	0	3	0	7	10

- Date: October 9
- Location: Memorial Stadium, Champaign, IL
- Game start: 1:32p.m. CST
- Elapsed time: 2:32
- Game attendance: 53,555
- Game weather: Mostly cloudy, NE wind 10 mph (16 km/h), 53 °F (12 °C)

Scoring summary
Q1	11:58	OHST	Keith 1 yard run (Schram kick)	OHST 7–0
Q1	10:09	OHST	Keith 2 yard run (Schram kick)	OHST 14–0
Q2	9:52	ILL	Wells 37 yard field goal	OHST 14–3
Q3	9:47	OHST	Hare 3 yard run (Schram kick)	OHST 21–3
Q3	6:12	OHST	Schram 26 yard field goal	OHST 24–3
Q4	8:22	ILL	Navarro 1 yard run (Wells kick)	OHST 24–10

=== Indiana ===
Team	1	2	3	4	Total
• Ohio State	7	3	3	14	27
Indiana	0	0	7	0	7

- Date: October 16
- Location: Memorial Stadium, Bloomington, IN
- Game start: 1:30p.m. EST
- Elapsed time: 3:35
- Game attendance: 50,812
- Game weather: Overcast, 74 °F (23 °C)

Scoring summary
Q1	11:06	OHST	Keith 3 yard run (Schram kick)	OHST 7–0
Q2	0:10	OHST	Schram 31 yard field goal	OHST 10–0
Q3	12:24	IND	St. Pierre 21 yard run (Garner kick)	OHST 10–7
Q3	10:23	OHST	Schram 40 yard field goal	OHST 13–7
Q4	13:15	OHST	Keith 1 yard run (Schram kick)	OHST 20–7
Q4	0:47	OHST	Lamka 25 yard run (Schram kick)	OHST 27–7

=== Wisconsin ===
Team	1	2	3	4	Total
Wisconsin	0	0	0	6	6
• Ohio St	0	17	0	14	31

- Date: October 23
- Location: Ohio Stadium, Columbus, Ohio
- Game start: 2:00p.m. EST
- Elapsed time: 2:40
- Game attendance: 86,559
- Game weather: Rainy, 62 °F (17 °C)

Scoring summary
Q2	12:45	OHST	Lippert 48 yard run (Schram kick)	OHST 7–0
Q2	10:37	OHST	Bradshaw 88 yard run (Schram kick)	OHST 14–0
Q2	0:44	OHST	Schram 41 yard field goal	OHST 17–0
Q4	13:49	OHST	Galbos 1 yard run (Schram kick)	OHST 24–0
Q4	1:07	WIS	Lund 12 yard run (pass failed)	OHST 24–6
Q4	0:55	OHST	Bradshaw 88 yard kickoff return (Schram kick)	OHST 31–6

=== Minnesota ===
Team	1	2	3	4	Total
• Ohio St	0	0	7	7	14
Minnesota	0	6	0	6	12

- Date: October 30
- Location: Memorial Stadium, Minneapolis, Minnesota
- Game start: 1:30 CST
- Elapsed time: 2:25
- Game attendance: 36,281
- Game weather: Rain, windy E(20-25 mph (40 km/h)), 50 °F (10 °C)

Scoring summary
Q2	1:27	MINN	Kingsriter 31 yard pass from Curry (kick failed)	MINN 6–0
Q3	7:42	OHST	Wakefield 4 yard pass from Lamka (Schram kick)	OHST 7–6
Q4	4:00	OHST	Galbos 4 yard run (Schram kick)	OHST 14–6
Q4	0:39	MINN	Curry 2 yard run (run failed)	OHST 14–12

=== Michigan State ===
Team	1	2	3	4	Total
• Michigan State	0	10	0	7	17
Ohio State	0	10	0	0	10

- Date: November 6
- Location: Ohio Stadium
- Game start: 1:29p.m. EST
- Elapsed time: 2:20
- Game attendance: 86,616
- Game weather: Rain/Snow, 35 °F (2 °C)

Scoring summary
Q2	14:12	MSU	Shlapak 47 yard field goal	MSU 0–3
Q2	9:55	OSU	Bradshaw 11 yard run (Schram kick)	OSU 7–3
Q2	5:54	MSU	Allen 5 yard run (Shlapak kick)	MSU 7–10
Q2	2:32	OSU	Shram 30 yard field goal	TIED 10–10
Q4	14:21	MSU	Allen 1 yard run (Shlapak kick)	MSU 17–10

=== Northwestern ===
Team	1	2	3	4	Total
• Northwestern	7	0	0	7	14
Ohio State	7	3	0	0	10

- Date: November 13
- Location: Ohio Stadium
- Game start: 1:32p.m. EST
- Elapsed time: 2:18
- Game attendance: 86,062
- Game weather: Clear, 60 °F (16 °C)

Scoring summary
Q1	4:19	OSU	Lamka 7 run (Schram kick)	OSU 7–0
Q1	4:05	NW	Strunk 93 yard kick-off return (Planisek kick)	TIED 7–7
Q2	5:13	OSU	Schram 27 yard field goal	OSU 10–7
Q4	7:25	NW	Anderson 1 yard run (Planisek kick)	NW 10–14

=== Michigan ===
Team	1	2	3	4	Total
Ohio State	0	0	7	0	7
• Michigan	0	3	0	7	10

- Date: November 20
- Location: Michigan Stadium, Ann Arbor, MI
- Game start: 1:30p.m. EST
- Elapsed time: 2:22
- Game attendance: 104,016
- Game weather: Overcast to Sunny, winds gusty 17 mph (27 km/h), 32 °F (0 °C)
- Referee: Jerry Markbreit (Big Ten)

Scoring summary
Q2	5:19	MICH	Coin 32 yard field goal	MICH 3–0
Q3	2:07	OSU	Campana 85 yard punt return (Schram kick)	OSU 3–7
Q4	2:07	MICH	Taylor 21 yard run (Coin kick)	MICH 10–7

On November 20, Ohio State lost to rival Michigan, 10–7, before an NCAA record crowd of 104,016 persons in attendance at Michigan Stadium. Michigan took a 3–0 lead at halftime on a 32-yard field goal by Dana Coin. Ohio State took the lead in the third quarter on an 85-yard punt return by Tom Campana. Michigan running back Billy Taylor put Michigan back in the lead with a 21-yard touchdown run with two minutes and seven seconds left in the game. Ohio State's final drive ended when Thom Darden intercepted a pass with one-and-a-half minutes remaining. After the interception, Ohio State coach Woody Hayes ran across the field, berating the officials for Darden going over the back of intended receiver Dick Wakefield. The officials assessed an unsportsmanlike conduct against Hayes. When the official moved the first-down markers to assess the penalty, Hayes pulled the markers from ground, threw one onto the field and threw the other to the ground, proceeding to then rip the plastic flag from the pole with his hand. The victory gave Michigan an undefeated record in the regular season for the first time since 1948.

== Roster ==
1971 Ohio State Buckeyes football team roster
Players
Coaches
Offense

Pos.	#	Name	Class
SE	23	Tom Battista	Jr
OT	78	Charles Beecroft	Jr
OT	77	Earl Belgrave	Jr
FB	34	John Bledsoe	Jr
G	58	Charles Bonica	Jr
QB	15	Bill Boyle	So
HB	25	Morris Bradshaw	So
HB	24	Tom Campagna	Sr
G	64	Bill Conley	Sr
C	52	Tom DeLeone (C)	Sr
FB	37	Pat Eggers	So
HB	46	Michael Gaffney	So
HB	33	Richard Galbos	Jr
HB	22	Richard Gales	So
QB	18	Greg Hare	So
SE	85	Jimmie Lee Harris	Sr
SE	82	David Hazel	So
G	57	Tom Houser	Sr
G	61	John Husband	So
SE	84	Scott Jones	So
G	63	Jim Kregel	So
QB	19	Don Lamka	Sr
HB	47	Elmer Lippert	So
OT	74	David Long	Sr
C	54	James Meckstroth	So
E	32	Richard Middleton	So
QB	12	Ross Moore	Jr
OT	72	Greg Mountz	Sr
C	56	Tom Nixon	Jr
E	80	Fred Pagac	So
G	50	Tony Pistick	Jr
OT	76	Dan Scott	So
OT	73	Richard Simon	Sr
E	96	John Smurda	So
G	60	Milan Vecanski	Sr
SE	91	Dick Wakefield	Sr
G	65	Tim Wersel	Jr
OT	71	Bob Willard	So

Defense

Pos.	#	Name	Class
DT	99	Tom Baxa	Jr
DE	93	Jeff Brown	Jr
DE	86	Richard Cappell	Sr
CB	11	Randall Cowman	Jr
S	8	Dan Cunnigham	Sr
DB	16	Jeff Davis	So
LB	51	Ken Dixon	Jr
LB	39	Richard Ferko	Jr
MG	55	Kevin Fletcher	Jr
LB	53	Randy Gradishar	So
DT	70	George Hasenohrl	Jr
CB	28	Harry Howard (C)	Sr
DB	14	Robert Kelly	So
DB	21	Carl Kern	So
CB	20	Marvin Kinsey	Jr
LB	62	Victor Koegel	So
DE	87	Ken Luttner	Sr
DE	81	Tom Marendt	So
MG	36	Glen Mason	Sr
CB	30	Louis Mathis	So
LB	59	Fred Pisanelli	Jr
MG	35	Rocco Rich	So
DE	83	Mike Scannell	Jr
DB	26	Warren Sharpp	So
DE	94	Terry Strong	Jr
DB	6	Monty Thompson	So
LB	88	Stan White	Sr

Special teams

Pos.	#	Name	Class
PK	2	Paul Johnston	Sr
P	92	Gary Lago	Jr
PK	1	Fred Schram	Sr

Head coach

- Woody Hayes

Coordinators/assistant coaches

- Earle Bruce (offensive guards and centers)
- George Chaump(offensive backfield)
- Charles Clausen (defensive line)
- George Hill (defensive coordinator)
- Rudy Hubbard (offensive backfield)
- John Mummey (freshman coach)
- Esco Sarkkinen (ends/scouting)
- Ralph Staub (offensive ends and tackles)
- Dick Walker (defensive backfield)

Legend

- (C) Team captain
- (S) Suspended
- (I) Ineligible
- Injured
- Redshirt

Roster
Last update: 2016-Oct-18

== Statistics ==
Rushing

Player	Attempts	Net yards	Yards per attempt	Touchdowns
Richard Galbos	141	540	3.8	3
Morris Bradshaw	65	340	5.2	4
Don Lamka	107	308	2.9	8
Elmer Lippert	53	265	5.0	2
John Bledsoe	61	265	4.3	2
Randal Keith	66	216	3.3	4
Greg Hare	25	84	3.4	2

Passing

Player	Attempts	Completions	Interceptions	Comp %	Yards	TD
Don Lamka	107	54	5	50.5	718	2
Greg Hare	59	25	5	42.4	299	0

Scoring

Player	TD	PAT	FG	Points
Don Lamka	8	0-0	0-0	48
Fred Schram	0	27-27	7-13	48
Morris Bradshaw	5	0-0	0-0	30
Randal Keith	4	0-0	0-0	24

Receiving

Player	No.	Yards	Avg	TD
Dick Wakefield	31	432	13.9	1
Rick Middleton	11	152	13.8	1
Jimmy Harris	9	200	22.2	0
Richard Galbos	9	47	5.2	0
Fred Pagac	5	59	11.8	0

== Awards and honors ==
Senior center Tom DeLeone from Kent, Ohio, was the only Ohio State player to receive national recognition. He received first-team honors on the 1971 All-America team by the UPI, NEA, Football News, Time magazine, and The Sporting News. He received second-team honors from the AP. He was also selected as the team's most valuable player.

The following Ohio State players received first- or second-team honors on the 1971 All-Big Ten Conference football team:

- Tom DeLeone, center (AP-1, UPI-1)
- Rick Simon, offensive tackle (UPI-1)
- George Hasenohrl, defensive tackle (AP-1, UPI-1)
- Stan White, linebacker (AP-1, UPI-2)
- Randy Gradishar, linebacker (AP-2, UPI-1)
- Tom Campana, defensive back (UPI-2)
- Harry Howard, defensive back (UPI-2)

DeLeone and Harry Howard were the team's co-captains. Other team awards included:

- Sigma Alpha Epsilon trophy as outstanding performer in the homecoming game - Randy Gradishar
- Quarterback Club - Randy Gradishar and Vic Koegel
- Jack W. Stephenson award as outstanding tackle - George Hasenohrl

== 1972 NFL draft picks ==
Player	Round	Pick	Position	NFL club
Tom DeLeone	5	106	Center	Cincinnati Bengals
Harry Howard	9	225	Defensive back	Los Angeles Rams
Jimmy Harris	12	312	Wide receiver	Dallas Cowboys
Tom Campana	13	316	Defensive back	St. Louis Cardinals
Dick Wakefield	16	409	Wide receiver	Cleveland Browns
Stan White	17	438	Linebacker	Baltimore Colts
