= 1971 Michigan Wolverines football team =

American college football season

1971 Michigan Wolverines football

Big Ten champion

Rose Bowl, L 12–13 vs. Stanford
- Conference: Big Ten Conference

Ranking
- Coaches: No. 4
- AP: No. 6
- Record: 11–1 (8–0 Big Ten)
- Head coach: Bo Schembechler (3rd season)
- Defensive coordinator: Jim Young (3rd season)
- MVP: Billy Taylor
- Captains: Frank Gusich; Guy Murdock
- Home stadium: Michigan Stadium

1971 Big Ten Conference football standings
	Conf.					Overall
Team	W		L		T	W		L		T
No. 6 Michigan $	8	–	0	–	0	11	–	1	–	0
Northwestern	6	–	3	–	0	7	–	4	–	0
Ohio State	5	–	3	–	0	6	–	4	–	0
Michigan State	5	–	3	–	0	6	–	5	–	0
Illinois	5	–	3	–	0	5	–	6	–	0
Wisconsin	3	–	5	–	0	4	–	6	–	1
Minnesota	3	–	5	–	0	4	–	7	–	0
Purdue	3	–	5	–	0	3	–	7	–	0
Indiana	2	–	6	–	0	3	–	8	–	0
Iowa	1	–	8	–	0	1	–	10	–	0
$ – Conference champion; Rankings from AP Poll

The 1971 Michigan Wolverines football team was an American football team that represented the University of Michigan in the 1971 Big Ten Conference football season. In their third season under head coach Bo Schembechler, the Wolverines compiled an 11–1 record, outscored opponents 421 to 83, won the Big Ten Conference championship, and were ranked No. 4 in the final UPI Poll and No. 6 in the final AP Poll. Defensive back Frank Gusich and center Guy Murdock were the team captains.

The Wolverines were undefeated in the regular season, including three consecutive shutout victories over Virginia (56–0), UCLA (38–0), and Navy (46–0). Two later victories over Indiana (61–7) and Iowa (63–7) were the Wolverines' highest point totals since a 69-point tally in 1947. The Michigan-Ohio State game set an NCAA record with a crowd of 104,016 at Michigan Stadium. In the 1972 Rose Bowl, Michigan lost to Stanford, 13–12, on a field goal with 12 seconds remaining.

Four Michigan players received first-team honors on the 1971 College Football All-America Team. They are:

- Linebacker Mike Taylor had 97 total tackles in 1971 and was selected as a consensus first-team All-American.
- Offensive guard Reggie McKenzie blocked and opened holes for an offense that compiled 3,977 rushing yards and was also selected as a consensus first-team All-American.
- Running back Billy Taylor rushed for 1,297 yards, was named as the team MVP, broke Michigan's career rushing record with 3,072 yards, and was selected as a first-team All-American by the Football News.
- Defensive back Thom Darden intercepted four passes with returns of 92 and 60 yards, averaged 10.3 yards on 23 punt returns, and was selected as a first-team All-American by the American Football Coaches Association and The Sporting News.

Linebacker Dana Coin set an NCAA record by successfully converting 55 of 55 extra points without a miss during the 1971 season. He was also the team's leading scorer with 79 points.

== Schedule ==
Date	Time	Opponent	Rank	Site	TV	Result	Attendance
September 11		at No. 20 Northwestern	No. 4	Dyche Stadium; Evanston, IL (rivalry)		W 21–6	42,472
September 18		Virginia*	No. 4	Michigan Stadium; Ann Arbor, MI		W 56–0	81,391
September 25		UCLA*	No. 4	Michigan Stadium; Ann Arbor, MI		W 38–0	88,042
October 2	1:30 p.m.	Navy*	No. 2	Michigan Stadium; Ann Arbor, MI		W 46–0	68,168
October 9		at Michigan State	No. 2	Spartan Stadium; East Lansing, MI (rivalry)	ABC	W 24–13	80,093
October 16		Illinois	No. 3	Michigan Stadium; Ann Arbor, MI (rivalry)		W 35–6	73,406
October 23		at Minnesota	No. 3	Memorial Stadium; Minneapolis, MN (Little Brown Jug)		W 35–7	44,176
October 30		Indiana^{†}	No. 3	Michigan Stadium; Ann Arbor, MI		W 61–7	75,751
November 6		Iowa	No. 3	Michigan Stadium; Ann Arbor, MI		W 63–7	72,467
November 13		at Purdue	No. 3	Ross–Ade Stadium; West Lafayette, IN		W 20–17	65,254
November 20		Ohio State	No. 3	Michigan Stadium; Ann Arbor, Michigan (The Game)		W 10–7	104,016
January 1, 1972		vs. No. 16 Stanford*	No. 4	Rose Bowl; Pasadena, CA (Rose Bowl)	NBC	L 12–13	103,154
*Non-conference game; ^{†}Homecoming; Rankings from AP Poll released prior to the game; All times are in Eastern time

== Season summary ==
=== Preseason ===
The 1970 Michigan team compiled a 9–1 record and was ranked No. 7 in the final Coaches Poll and No. 9 in the final AP Poll. The 1970 team was not permitted to accept a bowl invitation, as Big Ten policy prescribed that the Rose Bowl was the only bowl game in which a conference team could participate. In March 1971, Michigan coach Bo Schembechler launched a public campaign to change the Big Ten's restrictive bowl participation policy. He noted that lesser teams had played in major bowl games and said, "It was a crime what happened to us last season. We were the greatest team in the country not to play in a bowl game." The conference eventually rescinded its one-bowl policy in 1975.

Schembechler also spoke in opposition to the extension of the football schedule from 10 to 11 games for the 1971 season: "I think the NCAA made a mistake in going to 11 games. . . . I love the game and I love to coach it but I also realize that in college they still have to go to school. . . . it does take away somewhat from their academic pursuits. I was concerned about that."

Important players lost from the 1970 team included quarterback Don Moorhead, who had set 24 school records, including those for most yards of total offense and most passing yards. The candidates to take Moorhead's spot as the team's starting quarterback included Tom Slade, Kevin Casey, and Larry Cipa. After the first spring scrimmage, Schembechler criticized the play of his quarterbacks: "We have a lousy offense. We're going to have to run the ball every play." Slade and Casey ended up starting eight and four games, respectively. Cipa was the only one of the trio who went on to play quarterback in the NFL.

Other key players lost from the 1970 season included offensive lineman Dan Dierdorf, middle guard Henry Hill, and linebacker Marty Huff.

Michigan was ranked No. 4 in the final pre-season poll.

==== Recruiting ====
Michigan's recruiting class for 1971 included quarterback Dennis Franklin, running backs Chuck Heater and Gil Chapman, defensive back Dave Brown, linebacker Steve Strinko, and offensive lineman Dennis Franks. Chapman was the most heralded rookie back, having scored 564 points in high school.

=== Northwestern ===
Week 1: Michigan at Northwestern

Team	1	2	3	4	Total
• Michigan	0	7	14	0	21
Northwestern	0	0	0	6	6

- Date: September 11
- Location: Evanston, IL
- Game attendance: 42,472

Scoring summary
2	MICH	Rather 18-yard run (Coin kick)	Michigan 7–0
3	MICH	Rather recovered fumble in end zone (Coin kick)	Michigan 14–0
3	MICH	Taylor 5-yard run (Coin kick)	Michigan 21–0
4	NW	Cooks 2-yard pass from Daigneau (run failed)	Michigan 21–6

Michigan opened its 1971 season with a 21–6 victory over Northwestern in front of 42,472 spectators at Dyche Stadium in Evanston, Illinois. Sophomore Kevin Casey started at quarterback and completed only four of 11 passes for 34 yards and had one pass intercepted. Michigan's first touchdown was scored in the second quarter by split end Bo Rather on "an 18-yard razzle-dazzle end around TD run", with Jim Brandstatter making a key block. Rather scored again in the third quarter after a 51-yard field goal attempt by Dana Coin was knocked down by a Northwestern player as it fell short; Rather fell on the ball in the end zone, and the officials ruled it a live ball and fumble recovery. Tailback Billy Taylor scored Michigan's third touchdown on a five-yard touchdown run later in the third quarter. Taylor totaled 105 rushing yards on 28 carries in the game. Kicker Dana Coin converted all three point after touchdown attempts. On defense, Frank Gusich had two interceptions. Northwestern scored its touchdown in the fourth quarter on a short pass. After the game, coach Schembechler told the press, "It was no masterpiece, but it was effective."

After a review of game films, center Guy Murdock was named Michigan's offensive champion, and Gusich, with his two interceptions, was named defensive champion.

=== Virginia ===
Week 2: Virginia at Michigan

Team	1	2	3	4	Total
Virginia	0	0	0	0	0
• Michigan	14	21	14	7	56

- Date: September 18
- Location: Ann Arbor, MI
- Game attendance: 81,391

On September 18, Michigan defeated Virginia, 56–0, in the home opener before a crowd of 81,391 at Michigan Stadium. Michigan took a 35–0 lead at halftime and used its reserves extensively, including five quarterbacks and 11 running backs. Michigan's offense was heavily skewed in favor of the ground game, with 83 rushing carries and only 10 passes. The Wolverine backs carried the ball 83 times and totaled 495 rushing yards, including 107 yards by Ed Shuttlesworth and 89 yards, all in the first half, by Billy Taylor. Michigan scored seven rushing touchdowns, two each by Taylor and Alan Walker and one each by Shuttlesworth, Bob Thornbladh and Fritz Seyferth. Michigan's eighth touchdown was scored by Dave Elliott, the son of former Michigan player Pete Elliott, who fell on the ball after a Michigan kickoff was not fielded by Virginia as it made its way into the end zone. Kevin Casey started his second game at quarterback and completed two of five passes for 43 yards. Virginia completed only one pass and threw three interceptions. In total offense, Michigan out-gained Virginia, 566 yards to 78 yards. After the game, Virginia coach Don Lawrence praised Michigan's running backs: "Those are the best six running backs I've ever seen together. We were there, but we just got knocked down." Coach Schembechler opined, "There's not much to say, is there? We were bigger and stronger physically than they were."

=== UCLA ===
Week 3: UCLA at Michigan

Team	1	2	3	4	Total
UCLA	0	0	0	0	0
• Michigan	17	7	0	14	38

- Date: September 25
- Location: Ann Arbor, MI
- Game attendance: 89,177

On September 25, Michigan defeated UCLA, 38–0, before a crowd of 89,177 in the rain at Michigan Stadium. Michigan led 24–0 at halftime on touchdown runs by Fritz Seyferth and Ed Shuttlesworth, a 31-yard field goal by Dana Coin, and a 32-yard touchdown pass from Kevin Casey to Bo Rather. Casey's touchdown pass to Rather was the first of the year for Michigan. In the fourth quarter, Michigan added two more touchdowns on a 92-yard interception return by Thom Darden and a short run by Harry Banks. With 91 rushing yards, Billy Taylor passed 2,000 career rushing yards to move into third place among Michigan's career rushing leaders. On defense, Michigan held UCLA to 39 rushing yards and sacked UCLA quarterback nine times. After the game, UCLA coach Pepper Rodgers said, "I've never had a team dominated the way we were today."

After defeating UCLA, Michigan jumped to #2 in the AP and UPI polls.

=== Navy ===
Week 4: Navy at Michigan

Team	1	2	3	4	Total
Navy	0	0	0	0	0
• Michigan	7	8	10	21	46

- Date: October 2
- Location: Ann Arbor, MI
- Game attendance: 68,168

On October 2, Michigan defeated Navy, 46–0, in front of 68,168 spectators in Michigan Stadium. The game marked the first time since 1948 that a Michigan football team had shut out three consecutive opponents. Michigan's running backs scored five rushing touchdowns, two by Alan Walker and one each by Billy Taylor, Harry Banks, and Fritz Seyferth. With 76 rushing yards, Taylor passed Tom Harmon and moved into second place among Michigan's career rushing leaders. Ed Shuttlesworth also ran for a two-point conversion in the second quarter. Kevin Casey started his fourth game at quarterback and completed only one pass for eight yards, as Tom Slade, Larry Cipa and Jack McBride replaced him after the first quarter and jointly completed eight of 13 passes for 145 yards. Cipa threw a 49-yard touchdown pass to Mike Oldham with three minutes remaining in the game. Dana Coin converted five points after touchdown and kicked a field goal. Michigan out-gained Navy by 428 yards to 71 yards.

During a halftime ceremony, Michigan honored the crew of Apollo 15, James Irwin, David Scott, and Alfred Worden, all Michigan alumni.

=== Michigan State ===
Week 5: Michigan at Michigan State

Team	1	2	3	4	Total
• Michigan	7	3	0	14	24
Michigan State	0	7	0	6	13

- Date: October 9
- Location: East Lansing, MI
- Game attendance: 80,093
- TV announcers (ABC): Chris Schenkel, Bud Wilkinson

Scoring summary
Q1	12:17	MICH	Taylor 38 yard run (Coin kick)	MICH 7–0
Q2		MICH	Coin 27 yard field goal	MICH 10–0
Q3		MSU	Kolch 1 yard run (Shlapak kick)	MICH 10–7
Q4		MICH	Taylor 2 yard run (Coin kick)	MICH 17–7
Q4		MICH	Slade 7 yard run (Coin kick)	MICH 24–7
Q4		MSU	Allen 1 yard run (run failed)	MICH 24–13

On October 9, Michigan won its fifth consecutive game, defeating Michigan State, 24–13, in front of 80,093 spectators, the largest crowd to that time in the history of Spartan Stadium in East Lansing, Michigan. Billy Taylor rushed for 117 yards and two touchdowns on 15 carries. Tom Slade started his first game at quarterback, completed three of nine passes for 45 yards, and rushed for 48 yards and a touchdown. With Michigan State athletic director Biggie Munn in critical condition following a stroke, the Spartans kept the game close. Michigan State trailed 10–7 late in the third quarter and had the ball at Michigan's 14-yard line. At that point, Michigan's Butch Carpenter forced a fumble that was recovered by Mike Keller. The Wolverines then sealed the game with a two-yard touchdown run by Taylor and a seven-yard touchdown run by Slade. Michigan kicker Dana Coin converted three point after touchdown attempts and kicked a 27-yard field goal.

In the weekly polling after the Michigan-Michigan State game, the Wolverines dropped from #2 to #3 in both the Coaches and AP Polls. Oklahoma narrowly edged ahead of Michigan after an upset victory over Texas.

=== Illinois ===
Week 6: Illinois at Michigan

Team	1	2	3	4	Total
Illinois	6	0	0	0	6
• Michigan	7	14	0	14	35

- Date: October 16
- Location: Ann Arbor, MI
- Game attendance: 73,406

On October 16, Michigan defeated Illinois, 35–6, at Michigan Stadium. Quarterback Tom Slade threw an interception on the first play from scrimmage, setting up an Illinois touchdown only one minute and 23 seconds into the game. Slade then settled in, ran 25 yards for Michigan's first touchdown, and completed five of seven passes for 74 yards and a touchdown. Defensive back Thom Darden set up Michigan's second touchdown with a 47-yard punt return. Wingback Glenn Doughty was the star of the game for Michigan, as he rushed for 48 yards and two touchdowns on six carries and caught three passes for 56 yards and a touchdown. Billy Taylor led the rushing attack with 103 yards and a touchdown on 22 carries.

=== Minnesota ===
Week 7: Michigan at Minnesota

Team	1	2	3	4	Total
• Michigan	7	7	7	14	35
Minnesota	0	7	0	0	7

- Date: October 23
- Location: Minneapolis
- Game attendance: 44,176

Scoring summary
1	Michigan	Taylor 4-yard run (Coin kick)	Michigan 7–0
2	Minnesota	Honza 73-yard pass from Curry (Anderson kick)	Tie 7–7
2	Michigan	Seyferth 1-yard run (Coin kick)	Michigan 14–7
3	Michigan	Taylor 4-yard run (Coin kick)	Michigan 21–7
4	Michigan	Doughty 11-yard run (Coin kick)	Michigan 28–7
4	Michigan	Gustafson 5-yard pass from Cipa (Coin kick)	Michigan 35–7

On October 23, in the annual Little Brown Jug game, Michigan defeated Minnesota, 35–7, in front of 44,176 spectators in Minneapolis. Billy Taylor rushed for 166 and two touchdowns on 33 carries. He also surpassed Ron Johnson's career total of 2,524 rushing yards to become Michigan's all-time career rushing leader. Michigan rushed for 391 yards in all, including 96 yards for Ed Shuttlesworth, 62 yards and a touchdown for Glenn Doughty, and 25 yards and a touchdown to Fritz Seyferth. Michigan's passing game never got on track, as Tom Slade completed only one of seven passes for 13 yards. Coming into the game in the second half, Larry Cipa threw a five-yard touchdown pass to Larry Gustafson. Dana Coin converted all five point after touchdown kicks for Michigan.

=== Indiana ===
Week 8: Indiana at Michigan

Team	1	2	3	4	Total
Indiana	0	0	0	7	7
• Michigan	14	17	9	21	61

- Date: October 30
- Location: Ann Arbor, MI
- Game attendance: 75,751

On October 30, Michigan defeated Indiana, 61–7, before a crowd of 75,751 at Michigan Stadium. Michigan's 61 points was its highest score since a 69-point tally in 1947. Billy Taylor led the offense with 172 rushing yards, including touchdown runs of 43 and 66 yards, on 11 carries, an average of 15.6 yards per carry. Michigan rushed for a total of 452 yard, with addition touchdowns scored by third-string fullback Bob Thornbladh (2), quarterback Tom Slade (2), and Alan Walker. Thom Darden returned an interception 60 yards for a touchdown, and Michigan also scored on a safety when the Indiana returner took the ball at the one-yard line, took a step back, and downed the ball in the end zone. Michigan also recovered four fumbles and played its reserves extensively, with a total of 68 players seeing game action. Dana Coin added a field goal and five extra points. After the game, coach Bo Schembechler sent his regrets to his close friend and Indiana coach John Pont; Schembechler told the press, "I hate to beat anybody that bad, especially somebody I like."

=== Iowa ===
Week 9: Iowa at Michigan

Team	1	2	3	4	Total
Iowa	0	7	0	0	7
• Michigan	14	7	28	14	63

- Date: November 6
- Location: Ann Arbor, MI
- Game attendance: 72,476

Scoring summary
Q1	MICH	Shuttlesworth 5 yard run (Coin kick)	MICH 7–0
Q1	MICH	Shuttlesworth 3 yard run (Coin kick)	MICH 14–0
Q2	IOWA	Triplett 11 yard pass from Sunderman (Kokolus kick)	MICH 14–7
Q2	MICH	Shuttlesworth 3 yard run (Coin kick)	MICH 21–7
Q3	MICH	Taylor 5 yard run (Coin kick)	MICH 28–7
Q3	MICH	Doughty 2 yard run (Coin kick)	MICH 35–7
Q3	MICH	Rattner 24 yard pass from Slade (Coin kick)	MICH 42–7
Q3	MICH	Walker 28 yard run (Coin kick)	MICH 49–7
Q4	MICH	Thornbladh 3 yard run (Coin kick)	MICH 56–7
Q4	MICH	Walker 9 yard run (Coin kick)	MICH 63–7

On November 6, Michigan defeated Iowa, 63–7, in front of 72,467 "shivering fans" at Michigan Stadium. Fullback Ed Shuttlesworth rushed for three touchdowns in the first half to give Michigan a 21–0 lead at halftime. Shuttlesworth ended up with 112 yards on 16 carries. Michigan's backs totaled 493 rushing yards, including 98 yards and two touchdowns for Alan "Cowboy" Walker, 80 yards and one touchdown for Billy Taylor, Glenn Doughty with 57 yards and one touchdown, and Bob Thornbladh with 51 yard and a touchdown. Quarterback Tom Slade completed two of four passes for 32 yards, including a 24-yard touchdown pass to Bo Rather. Dana Coin kicked seven extra points, giving him an NCAA record with 51 consecutive successful extra point kicks.

=== Purdue ===
Week 10: Michigan at Purdue

Team	1	2	3	4	Total
• Michigan	7	0	7	6	20
Purdue	3	0	7	7	17

- Date: November 13
- Location: West Lafayette, IN
- Game attendance: 65,254

On November 13, Michigan defeated Purdue, 20–17. For the second consecutive week, Ed Shuttlesworth led Michigan in rushing, totaling 125 yards and a touchdown on 28 carries. Billy Taylor added 98 yards and Glenn Doughty 93 yards. Dana Coin added two field goals, including the winning field goal with 46 seconds left in the game. Purdue quarterback Gary Danielson, who attended high school in Dearborn, Michigan and played for the Detroit Lions from 1976-84, kept the game close with touchdown passes of nine and 66 yards.

=== Ohio State ===
Week 11: Ohio State at Michigan

Team	1	2	3	4	Total
Ohio State	0	0	7	0	7
• Michigan	0	3	0	7	10

- Date: November 20
- Location: Ann Arbor, MI
- Game start: 1:00 pm
- Game attendance: 104,000
- Game weather: 41 F
- Referee: Jerry Markbreit

Scoring summary
2		MICH	Coin 32-yard field goal	MICH 3–0
3		OSU	Campana 85-yard punt return (Schram kick)	OSU 7–3
4	2:07	MICH	Taylor 21-yard run (Coin kick)	MICH 10–7

On November 20, Michigan defeated Ohio State, 10–7, before an NCAA record crowd of 104,016 persons in attendance at Michigan Stadium. Michigan took a 3–0 lead at halftime on a 32-yard field goal by Dana Coin. Ohio State took the lead in the third quarter on an 85-yard punt return by Tom Campana. Billy Taylor, assisted by a devastating block by Fritz Seyferth, put Michigan back in the lead with a 21-yard touchdown run with two minutes and seven seconds left in the game. Ohio State's final drive ended when Thom Darden intercepted a pass with one-and-a-half minutes remaining. After the interception, Ohio State coach Woody Hayes ran across the field, berating each of the officials for Darden going over the back of intended receiver Richard Wakefield. The officials, led by referee Jerry Markbreit, assessed an unsportsmanlike conduct against Hayes. When the official moved the first-down markers to assess the penalty, Hayes pulled the markers from ground, threw one onto the field and threw the other to the ground, proceeding to then rip the plastic flag from the pole with his hand. The victory gave Michigan an undefeated record in the regular season for the first time since 1948.

=== 1972 Rose Bowl ===
The game was the first Rose Bowl meeting between the two schools since the inaugural Rose Bowl in 1902, in which Michigan crushed Stanford, 49–0. In the 1972 rematch, Michigan was ranked #3 in the country and favored by 10½ points. Michigan's Dana Coin kicked a 30-yard field goal in the second quarter for the only first half scoring. In the first series of the second half, Stanford stopped the Wolverines on fourth and one at Stanford's four-yard line, then tied the game on a 42-yard field goal. Early in the fourth quarter, Michigan's Fritz Seyferth scored on a one-yard dive to put Michigan up 10–3. After Stanford got the ball back, the Indians faced fourth and ten from their own 33. Stanford ran a fake punt, with Jim Kehl receiving the snap and handing the ball forward to Jackie Brown through Brown's legs. Brown ran 33 yards for a first down, and followed up a minute later with a 24-yard touchdown run to tie the game. Late in the fourth quarter, Michigan recovered a Stanford fumble near midfield. Facing fourth down with time running down, the Wolverines attempted a 42-yard field goal. The kick was short, and Stanford safety Jim Ferguson caught the ball and attempted to run it out of the end zone. Instead, he was knocked back into the end zone by Ed Shuttlesworth for a controversial Michigan safety, as replays seemed to show that Ferguson's forward progress was to the three-yard line. This made the score 12–10 with just over three minutes to play, and Michigan due to get the ball on a free kick. Following the free kick, Stanford held Michigan to a three-and-out and got the ball back on their own 22-yard line with 1:48 to go. Bunce then threw five consecutive completions to take Stanford to the Michigan 17-yard line with 22 seconds left. The Indians ran twice to get to the Michigan 14-yard line with 12 seconds left. From there, Stanford kicked a 31-yard field goal to give Stanford a 13–12 victory with 12 seconds left.

=== Ranking and honors ===
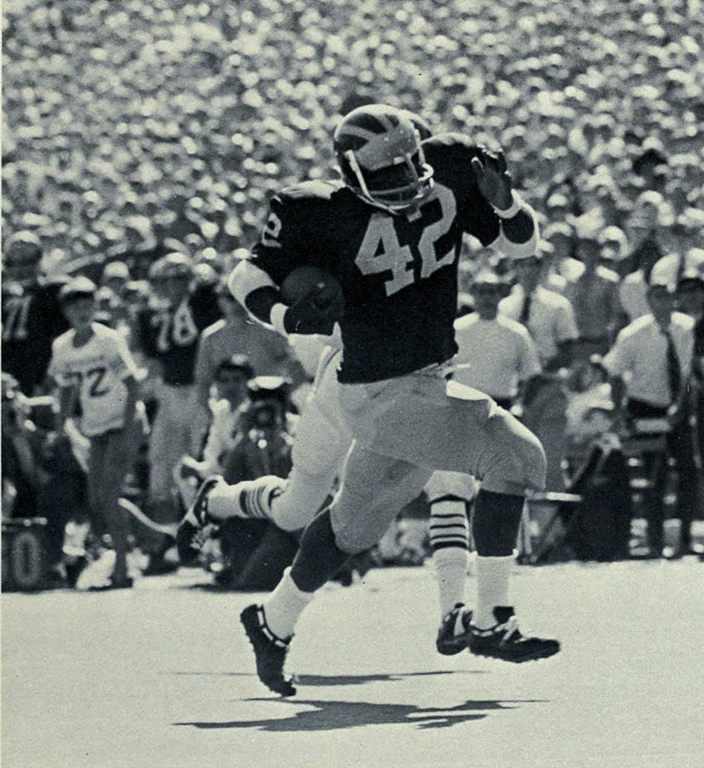
Record-setting running back Billy Taylor

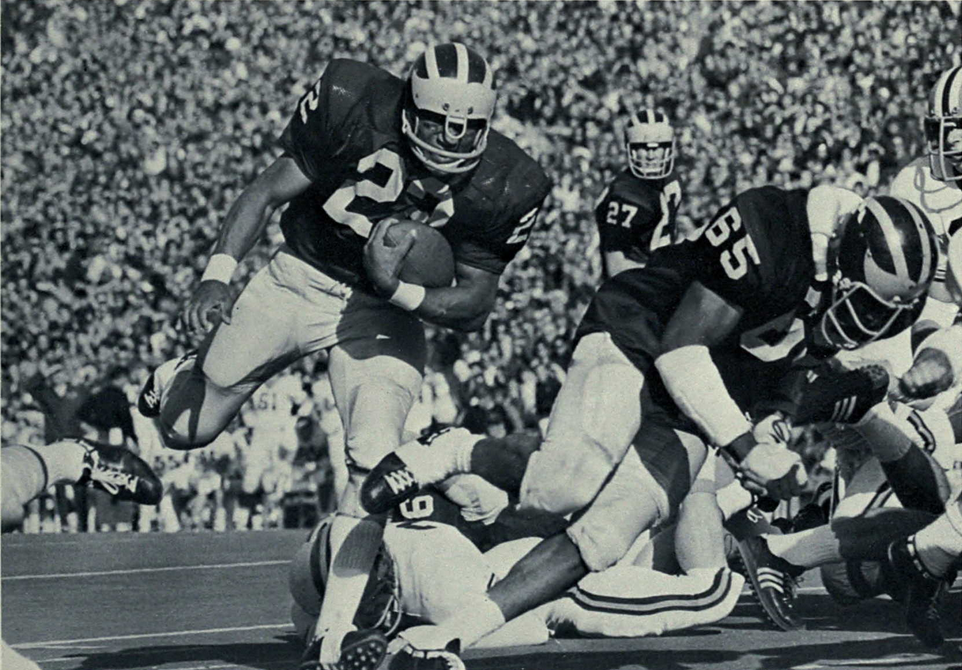
Consensus All-American Reggie McKenzie (No. 65) blocking for Glenn Doughty (No. 22)

In their third season under coach Schembechler, the Wolverines compiled an 11–1 record, outscored opponents 421 to 83, won the Big Ten Conference championship, and played in their second Rose Bowl in three years. In early January 1972, the Associated Press (AP) released its final post-season college football poll for the 1971 season. The 1971 Nebraska Cornhuskers football team was ranked No. 1, and Michigan dropped from No. 4 to No. 6.

After setting Michigan's career rushing record, Billy Taylor received numerous honors at the end of the 1971 season, including the following:

- He was selected by the Football News (FN) as a first-team running back on the 1971 College Football All-America Team. He also received second-team honors from the United Press International (UPI) and third-team honors from the AP.
- He was selected by his Michigan teammates as the winner of the team's most valuable player award for the 1971 season.
- In a close competition, he finished second behind Michigan State's Eric Allen for the Chicago Tribune Silver Football trophy as the most valuable player in the Big Ten Conference.

Four other Michigan players won first-team All-American honors as follows:

- Offensive guard Reggie McKenzie, who blocked and opened holes for an offense that compiled 3,977 rushing yards, was recognized as a consensus first-team All-American. He received first-team honors from the AP, Football Writers Association of America (FWAA), Newspaper Enterprise Association (NEA), UPI, FN, Time, The Sporting News (TSN), and the Walter Camp Football Foundation (WCFF).
- Linebacker Mike Taylor, who had 97 total tackles in 1971, was also recognized as a consensus first-team All-American. He received first-team honors from the American Football Coaches Association (AFCA), AP, FWAA, NEA, UPI, FN, Time, TSN, and WCFF.
- Defensive back Thom Darden intercepted four passes with returns of 92 and 60 yards, averaged 10.3 yards on 23 punt returns, and received first-team honors from the AFCA and TSN and second-team honors from the AP and UPI.
- Defensive end Mike Keller received third-team honors from the AP.

Linebacker and placekicker Dana Coin set an NCAA record by successfully converting 55 of 55 extra points without a miss during the 1971 season. He was also the team's leading scorer with 79 points.

Fifteen Michigan players received honors on the 1971 All-Big Ten Conference football team. Thom Darden, Reggie McKenzie, Billy Taylor, and Mike Taylor received first-team honors from both the AP and UPI, and Mike Keller received first-team honors from the AP. Players receiving second-team honors were Tom Coyle (AP-2, UPI-2), Guy Murdock (AP-2, UPI-2), Ed Shuttlesworth (UPI-2), Glenn Doughty (UPI-2), Paul Seymour (UPI-2), Chris Tucker (AP-2), Jim Brandstatter (UPI-2), Jim Coode (UPI-2), Alden Carpenter (UPI-2), and Tom Beckman (AP-2).

Team awards went to Billy Taylor (Most Valuable Player), Guy Murdock (Meyer Morton Award), Dave Gallagher (John Maulbetsch Award), Tom Kee (Frederick Matthaei Award), and Bruce Elliott (Arthur Robinson Scholarship Award).

== Personnel ==
The following individuals won varsity letters for their participation on the 1971 Michigan football team. Players who started at least six games are highlighted in bold.

=== Offense ===
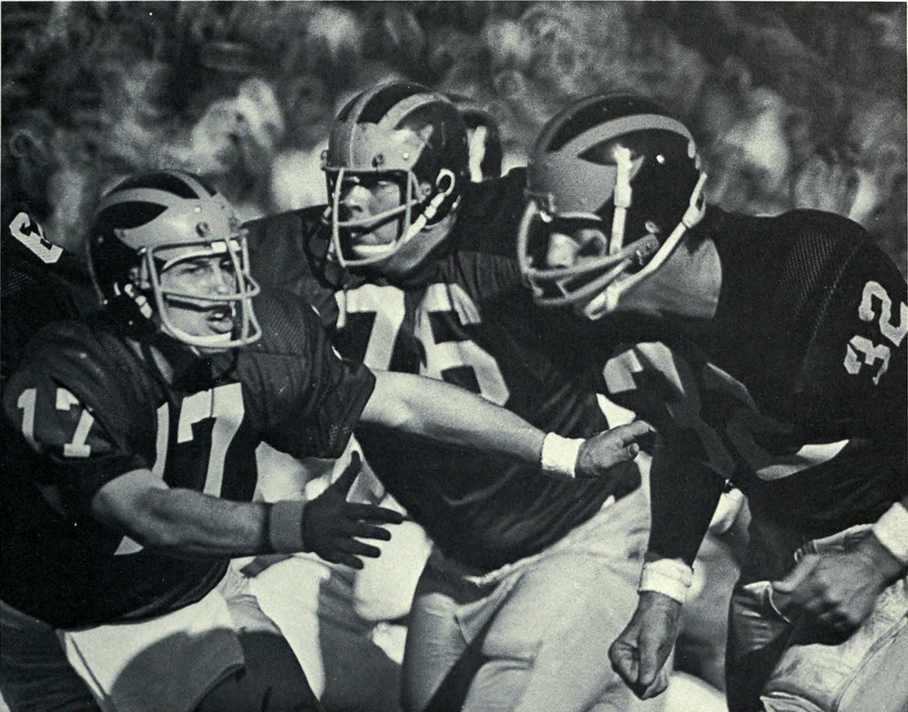
Tom Slade (No. 17), Jim Brandstatter (No. 76), and Fritz Seyferth (No. 32)

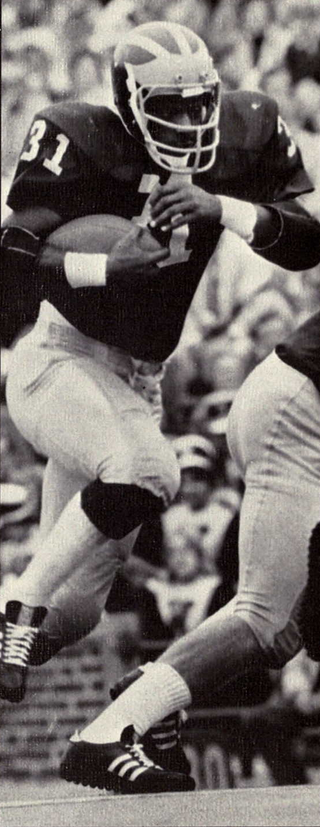
Running back Ed Shuttlesworth

No.	Name	Position	Games started	Class	Hometown	Ht.	Wt.
20	Harry Banks	TB	0	Fr.	St. Johns, Michigan	5'10"	177
76	**Jim Brandstatter**	RT	10	Sr.	East Lansing, Michigan	6'4"	245
12	Kevin Casey	QB	4	Soph.	Grand Rapids, Michigan	6'2"	175
13	Larry Cipa	QB	1 (wolf)	Jr.	Cincinnati	6'3"	203
40	Gary R. Coakley	SE	0	Jr.	Detroit	6'2"	197
73	**Jim Coode**	LT	10	Jr.	Mayfield Hts., Ohio	6'3-1/2	235
60	**Thomas J. Coyle**	RG	12	Jr.	Chicago	6'0"	233
22	**Glenn Doughty**	WB	12	Sr.	Detroit	6'2"	204
59	Mark F. Duffy	C	0	Sr.	Chicago	5'11"	224
48	Larry Gustafson	WB	0	Soph.	Mays Landing, New Jersey	5'11"	176
56	William J. Hart	C	0	Jr.	Rockford, Michigan	5'11"	176
43	Clint Haslerig	WB	0	Soph.	Cincinnati	6'1"	182
61	Mike Hoban	OG	0	Soph.	Chicago	6'2"	232
52	Scott E. Hulke	OT	0	Sr.	Elgin, Illinois	6'5"	224
65	**Reggie McKenzie**	LG	12	Sr.	Highland Park, Michigan	6'4"	232
53	**Guy Murdock**	C	12	Sr.	Barrington, Illinois	6'2"	210
84	Michael Oldham	SE	0	Sr.	Cincinnati	6'3"	198
79	Thomas Poplawski	LT	2	Jr.	Warren, Michigan	6'4"	224
15	**Bo Rather**	SE	11	Jr.	Sandusky, Ohio	6'1"	180
63	Gerald F. Schumacher	OG	0	Jr.	Chicago	6'2"	224
83	Paul Seal	TE	1 (SE)	Soph.	Detroit	6'6"	208
32	**Fritz Seyferth**	FB	12	Sr.	Darien, Connecticut	6'3"	218
85	**Paul Seymour**	TE	12	Jr.	Berkley, Michigan	6'5"	231
31	Ed Shuttlesworth	FB	0	Soph.	Cincinnati	6'2"	235
17	**Tom Slade**	QB	8	Soph.	Saginaw, Michigan	6'1"	198
42	**Billy Taylor**	TB	11	Sr.	Barberton, Ohio	5'11"	195
30	Bob Thornbladh	FB	3 (DB)	Soph.	Plymouth, Michigan	6'2"	224
78	Chris Tucker	RT	2 (RT); 2 (DT)	Soph.	Cleveland	6'1"	234
49	Alan "Cowboy" Walker	TB	1	Jr.	Cincinnati	6'1-1/2"	243
16	David Zuccarelli	WB	0	Jr.	Chicago	6'0"	196

=== Defense ===
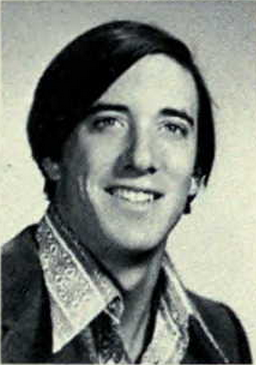
Third-team All-American Mike Keller

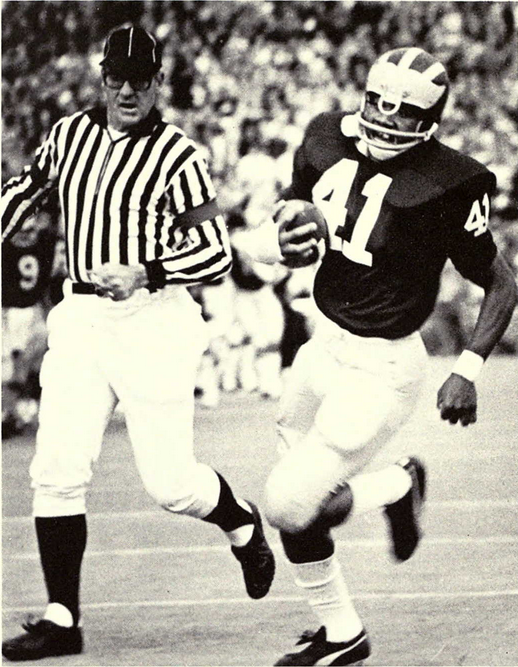
Defensive back Randy Logan

No.	Name	Position	Games started	Class	Hometown	Ht.	Wt.
99	**Tom Beckman**	DT	5 (MLB); 3 (RDT); 3 (RDE)	Sr.	Chesaning, Michigan	6'5"	246
94	**Alden "Butch" Carpenter**	LDE	12	Sr.	Flint, Michigan	6'2"	215
36	Dana Coin	LB, PK	2 (OLB)	Sr.	Pontiac, Michigan	6'1"	229
35	**Thom Darden**	S	10	Sr.	Sandusky, Ohio	6'2"	195
25	Barry Dotzauer	DB	0	Soph.	Cincinnati	6'1"	162
28	Thomas E. Drake	DB	0	Soph.	Midland, Michigan	5'11"	175
86	Donald R. Eaton	DE	0	Jr.	Lancaster, Ohio	6'4"	194
21	**Bruce N. Elliott**	DB	12	Sr.	Indianapolis	6'0"	175
45	Dave Elliott	DB	0	Soph.	Indianapolis	6'2"	170
68	**Gregory A. Ellis**	MG	10	Jr.	Connersville, Indiana	6'2"	223
71	Dave Gallagher	DT	1 (MG)	Soph.	Piqua, Ohio	6'4"	225
92	**Fred Grambau**	LDT	9	Jr.	Ossineke, Michigan	6'2-1/2"	234
14	**Frank Gusich**	Wolf back	8	Sr.	Garfield Hts., Ohio	6'0"	188
37	**Thomas G. Kee**	LB	9 RDT); 3 (OLB)	Jr.	Wheaton, Illinois	5'11"	210
90	**Mike Keller**	DE	6 (OLB); 5 (RDE)	Sr.	Grand Rapids, Michigan	6'3"	215
41	**Randy Logan**	DB	11	Jr.	Detroit	6'2"	192
93	John P. Middlebrook	LB	0	Sr.	Jackson, Michigan	6'0"	210
95	Robert J. Rosema	DE	0	Sr.	Grand Rapids, Michigan	6'3"	193
55	Walter E. Sexton	MG	1 (LDT); 1 (MG)	Soph.	Massapequa, New York	5'11"	200
74	Tony L. Smith	DT	0	Jr.	Detroit	6'5"	230
96	Clinton Spearman	DE	0	Jr.	Hamilton, Ohio	6'3"	223
38	Geoffry Steger	Wolf back	3	Soph.	Winnetka, Illinois	6'0"	188
33	**Mike Taylor**	LB	6 (MLB); 4 (RDE); 1 (OLB)	Sr.	Detroit	6'1-1/2"	224
75	Douglas Troszak	DT	0	Soph.	Warren, Michigan	6'3"	241

=== Others ===
The following individuals were on the team roster but did not win varsity letters.

- Dave Brandon, quarterback, sophomore, Plymouth, Michigan
- Don Coleman, fullback, sophomore, Daly City, Ohio

=== Statistical leaders ===
==== Rushing ====
Player	Attempts	Net yards	Yards per attempt	Touchdowns	Long
Billy Taylor	249	1297	5.2	13	66
Ed Shuttlesworth	182	875	4.8	6	28
Glenn Doughty	98	474	4.8	5	3

==== Passing ====
Player	Attempts	Completions	Interceptions	Comp %	Yards	Yds/Comp	TD	Long
Tom Slade	63	27	4	42.9	364	13.5	2	28
Kevin Casey	34	14	1	41.2	165	11.8	1	32
Larry Cipa	25	7	2	28.0	146	20.9	2	49

==== Receiving ====
Player	Receptions	Yards	Yds/Recp	TD	Long
Glenn Doughty	16	203	12.7	1	22
Bo Rather	11	181	16.4	2	32
Mike Oldham	7	136	19.4	1	49

==== Kickoff returns ====
Player	Returns	Yards	Yds/Return	TD	Long
Bo Rather	12	240	20.0	0	30
Harry Banks	5	120	24.0	0	45
Glenn Doughty	3	50	16.7	0	21

==== Punt returns ====
Player	Returns	Yards	Yds/Return	TD	Long
Thom Darden	23	237	10.3	0	47
Bruce Elliott	28	225	8.0	0	36

=== Professional football ===
Twenty-two members of the 1971 team went on to play professional football. They are: (1) Tom Beckman (St. Louis Cardinals, 1972, Memphis Grizzlies, 1974–1975), (2) Larry Cipa (New Orleans Saints, 1974–75); (3) Jim Coode (Ottawa Rough Riders, 1974–80); (4) Thom Darden (Cleveland Browns, 1972–1981), (5) Glenn Doughty (Baltimore Colts, 1972–1979), (6) Dave Gallagher (Chicago Bears, 1974, New York Giants, 1975–76, Detroit Lions, 1978–79), (7) Fred Grambau (Hamilton Tiger-Cats, 1973–75), (8) Clint Haslerig (Chicago Bears, 1974, Buffalo Bills, 1974–75, Minnesota Vikings, 1975, New York Jets, 1976), (9) Mike Hoban (Chicago Bears, 1974), (10) Mike Keller (Dallas Cowboys, 1972), (11) Randy Logan (Philadelphia Eagles, 1973–83), (12) Reggie McKenzie (Buffalo Bills, 1972–1982), (13) Seattle Seahawks, 1983–1984), (14) Guy Murdock (Houston Oilers, 1974; Chicago Fire/Winds, 1974–1975), (15) Bo Rather (Miami Dolphins, 1973, 1978; Chicago Bears, 1974–78), (16) Paul Seal (New Orleans Saints, 1974–76, San Francisco 49ers, 1977–78), (17) Fritz Seyferth (Calgary Stampeders, 1972), (18) Paul Seymour (Buffalo Bills, 1973–1977), (19) Ed Shuttlesworth (Toronto Argonauts, 1971–1973), (20) Billy Taylor (Calgary Stampeders, 1972), (21) Mike Taylor (New York Jets, 1972–73), and (22) Bob Thornbladh (Kansas City Chiefs, 1974).

=== Coaching staff ===
- Head coach: Bo Schembechler
- Assistant coaches: Tirrel Burton (freshman coach), Jerry Hanlon (offensive line), Dick Hunter (defensive backfield), Frank Maloney (defensive line), George Mans (offensive ends), Gary Moeller (defensive ends), Larry Smith (interior line), Chuck Stobart (offensive backfield), Jim Young (defensive coordinator)
- Trainer: Lindsy McLean
- Manager: Charles Quebbeman
