= 1971 Michigan State Spartans football team =

American college football season

1971 Michigan State Spartans football
- Conference: Big Ten Conference
- Record: 6–5 (3–4 Big Ten)
- Head coach: Duffy Daugherty (18th season)
- Defensive coordinator: Denny Stolz (1st season)
- MVP: Eric Allen
- Captains: Eric Allen; Ron Curl
- Home stadium: Spartan Stadium

1971 Big Ten Conference football standings
	Conf.					Overall
Team	W		L		T	W		L		T
No. 6 Michigan $	8	–	0	–	0	11	–	1	–	0
Northwestern	6	–	3	–	0	7	–	4	–	0
Ohio State	5	–	3	–	0	6	–	4	–	0
Michigan State	5	–	3	–	0	6	–	5	–	0
Illinois	5	–	3	–	0	5	–	6	–	0
Wisconsin	3	–	5	–	0	4	–	6	–	1
Minnesota	3	–	5	–	0	4	–	7	–	0
Purdue	3	–	5	–	0	3	–	7	–	0
Indiana	2	–	6	–	0	3	–	8	–	0
Iowa	1	–	8	–	0	1	–	10	–	0
$ – Conference champion; Rankings from AP Poll

The 1971 Michigan State Spartans football team was an American football team that represented Michigan State University as a member of the Big Ten Conference during the 1971 Big Ten football season. In their 18th season under head coach Duffy Daugherty, the Spartans compiled a 6–5 record (5-3 in conference games), tied for third place in the Big Ten, and outscored opponents by a total of 225 to 169. In three games against ranked opponents, they lost to No. 4 Notre Dame and No. 2 Michigan and defeated No. 9 Ohio State.

On offense, the Spartans gained an average of 232.6 rushing yards and 98.0 passing yards per game. On defense, they gave up 171.5 rushing yards and 108.1 passing yards per game. The individual statistical leaders included quarterback Mike Rasmussen with 642 passing yards, halfback Eric Allen with 1,494 rushing yards and 18 touchdowns, and tight end Billy Joe DuPree with 25 receptions and 414 receiving yards. Allen also led the Big Ten in both rushing yards and touchdowns and was selected as the team's most valuable player.

Four Spartans were selected by either the Associated Press (AP) or the United Press International (UPI) as first-team players on the 1971 All-Big Ten Conference football team: Eric Allen at running back (AP-1, UPI-1); offensive guard Joe DeLamielleure (AP-1, UPI-1); defensive tackle Ron Curl (AP-1, UPI-1); and defensive back Brad Van Pelt (AP-1, UPI-1).

The team played its home games at Spartan Stadium in East Lansing, Michigan.

== Schedule ==
Date	Opponent	Rank	Site	Result	Attendance	Source
September 11	Illinois		Spartan Stadium; East Lansing, MI	W 10–0	42,083	
September 18	at Georgia Tech*	No. 18	Grant Field; Atlanta, GA	L 0–10	50,646	
September 25	Oregon State*		Spartan Stadium; East Lansing, MI	W 31–14	62,184	
October 2	at No. 4 Notre Dame*		Notre Dame Stadium; Notre Dame, IN (rivalry)	L 2–14	59,075	
October 9	No. 2 Michigan		Spartan Stadium; East Lansing, MI (rivalry)	L 13–24	80,093	
October 16	at Wisconsin		Camp Randall Stadium; Madison, WI	L 28–31	74,847	
October 23	Iowa^{†}		Spartan Stadium; East Lansing, MI	W 34–3	60,383	
October 30	at Purdue		Ross–Ade Stadium; West Lafayette, IN	W 43–10	66,339	
November 6	at No. 9 Ohio State		Ohio Stadium; Columbus, OH	W 17–10	86,616	
November 13	Minnesota		Spartan Stadium; East Lansing, MI	W 40–25	61,419	
November 20	at Northwestern	No. 19	Dyche Stadium; Evanston, IL	L 7–28	30,012	
*Non-conference game; ^{†}Homecoming; Rankings from AP Poll released prior to the game

== Roster ==
1971 Michigan State Spartans football team roster
Players
Coaches
Offense

Pos.	#	Name	Class
FB	41	Ken Alderson	Jr
WR	24	Eric Allen	Sr
WR	19	Randy Davis	Jr
G	59	Joe DeLamielleure	Jr
TE	89	Billy Joe DuPree	Sr
G	65	Chris King	Jr
RB	23	Henry Matthews	Sr
TE	85	Brian McConnell	So
QB	12	Mike Rasmussen	Sr

Defense

Pos.	#	Name	Class
CB	25	Doug Barr	Sr
LB	98	Gail Clark	Jr
DE	91	Doug Halliday	Sr
DE	61	Ernie Hamilton	Jr
DT	99	Duane McLaughlin	Sr
S	10	Brad Van Pelt	Jr

Special teams

Pos.	#	Name	Class

Head coach

- Duffy Daugherty

Coordinators/assistant coaches

Legend

- (C) Team captain
- (S) Suspended
- (I) Ineligible
- Injured
- Redshirt

== Game summaries ==
=== Michigan ===
Team	1	2	3	4	Total
• Michigan	7	3	0	14	24
Michigan State	0	7	0	6	13

- Date: October 9
- Location: Spartan Stadium, East Lansing, MI
- Game attendance: 80,093

Scoring summary
Q1	12:17	MICH	Taylor 38 yard run (Coin kick)	MICH 7–0
Q2		MICH	Coin 27 yard field goal	MICH 10–0
Q3		MSU	Kolch 1 yard run (Shlapak kick)	MICH 10–7
Q4		MICH	Taylor 2 yard run (Coin kick)	MICH 17–7
Q4		MICH	Slade 7 yard run (Coin kick)	MICH 24–7
Q4		MSU	Allen 1 yard run (run failed)	MICH 24–13

On October 9, 1971, Michigan State lost Michigan, 24–13, in front of 80,093 spectators, the largest crowd to that time in the history of Spartan Stadium in East Lansing, Michigan. Billy Taylor rushed for 117 yards and two touchdowns on 15 carries. Tom Slade started his first game at quarterback, completed three of nine passes for 45 yards, and rushed for 48 yards and a touchdown. With Michigan State athletic director Biggie Munn in critical condition following a stroke, the Spartans kept the game close. Michigan State trailed 10–7 late in the third quarter and had the ball at Michigan's 14-yard line. At that point, Michigan's Butch Carpenter forced a fumble that was recovered by Mike Keller. The Wolverines then sealed the game with a two-yard touchdown run by Taylor and a seven-yard touchdown run by Slade. Michigan kicker Dana Coin converted three point after touchdown attempts and kicked a 27-yard field goal.
