= 1971 Wisconsin Badgers football team =

American college football season

1971 Wisconsin Badgers football
- Conference: Big Ten Conference
- Record: 4–6–1 (3–5 Big Ten)
- Head coach: John Jardine (2nd season)
- Offensive coordinator: Paul Roach (2nd season)
- Offensive scheme: Option
- Defensive coordinator: Lew Stueck (2nd season)
- Base defense: 4–3
- MVP: Neil Graff
- Captains: Roger Jaeger; Bill Poindexter
- Home stadium: Camp Randall Stadium

1971 Big Ten Conference football standings
	Conf.					Overall
Team	W		L		T	W		L		T
No. 6 Michigan $	8	–	0	–	0	11	–	1	–	0
Northwestern	6	–	3	–	0	7	–	4	–	0
Ohio State	5	–	3	–	0	6	–	4	–	0
Michigan State	5	–	3	–	0	6	–	5	–	0
Illinois	5	–	3	–	0	5	–	6	–	0
Wisconsin	3	–	5	–	0	4	–	6	–	1
Minnesota	3	–	5	–	0	4	–	7	–	0
Purdue	3	–	5	–	0	3	–	7	–	0
Indiana	2	–	6	–	0	3	–	8	–	0
Iowa	1	–	8	–	0	1	–	10	–	0
$ – Conference champion; Rankings from AP Poll

The 1971 Wisconsin Badgers football team was an American football team that represented the University of Wisconsin as a member of the Big Ten Conference during the 1971 Big Ten season. In their second year under head coach John Jardine, the Badgers compiled a 4–6–1 record (3–5 in conference games), tied for sixth place in the Big Ten, and were outscored by a total of 258 to 240.

The Badgers gained an average of 161.1 passing yards and 213.5 rushing yards per game. On defense, they gave up an average of 137.6 passing yards and 240.5 rushing yards per game. The team's individual statistical leaders included: quarterback Neil Graff (1,300 passing yards); running back Rufus Ferguson (1,222 rushing yards); and wide receiver Albert Hannah (39 receptions for 608 yards).

Dave Lokanc and Keith Nosbusch were the team captains. Quarterback Neil Graff was selected as the team's most valuable player. Three Wisconsin players received first- or second-team All-Big Ten honors from the Associated Press (AP) or United Press International (UPI): Ferguson at running back (AP-1, UPI-1); Lokanc at linebacker (AP-2); and Neovia Greyer at defensive back (AP-2).

The Badgers played their home games at Camp Randall Stadium in Madison, Wisconsin.

== Schedule ==
Date	Opponent	Site	Result	Attendance	Source
September 11	Northern Illinois*	Camp Randall Stadium; Madison, WI	W 31–0	45,437	
September 18	at No. 15 Syracuse*	Archbold Stadium; Syracuse, NY	T 20–20	31,602	
September 25	No. 18 LSU*	Camp Randall Stadium; Madison, WI	L 28–38	78,535	
October 2	at Northwestern	Dyche Stadium; Evanston, IL	L 11–24	40,473	
October 9	Indiana	Camp Randall Stadium; Madison, WI	W 35–29	66,156	
October 16	Michigan State	Camp Randall Stadium; Madison, WI	W 31–28	74,847	
October 23	at No. 12 Ohio State	Ohio Stadium; Columbus, OH	L 6–31	86,559	
October 30	at Iowa	Iowa Stadium; Iowa City, IA (rivalry)	L 16–20	43,155	
November 6	Purdue^{†}	Camp Randall Stadium; Madison, WI	W 14–10	78,451	
November 13	Illinois	Camp Randall Stadium; Madison, WI	L 27–35	65,459	
November 20	at Minnesota	Memorial Stadium; Minneapolis, MN (rivalry)	L 21–23	34,738	
*Non-conference game; ^{†}Homecoming; Rankings from AP Poll released prior to the game

== Roster ==
1971 Wisconsin Badgers football team roster
Players
Coaches
Offense

Pos.	#	Name	Class
G	63	Bob Braun	Jr
RB	21	Rufus Ferguson	Jr
QB	12	Neil Graff	Sr
WR	84	Albert Hannah	Sr
WR	18	Michael Harrington	So
G, K	64	Roger Jaeger (C)	Sr
WR	40	Tim Klosek	Jr
FB, P	34	John Krugman	Sr
G	60	Mark Levenhagen	So
TE	86	Tom Lonnborg	Jr
FB	30	Gary Lund	Jr
TE	88	Larry Mialik	Sr
RB	44	Lance Moon	Sr
OT	62	Keith Nosbusch	Jr
C	52	Mike Passini	Jr
QB	15	Rudy Steiner	Jr
FB	37	Alan Thompson	Sr
OT	71	Elbert Walker	Sr
C	51	Mike Webster	So
WR	82	Terry Whittaker	Sr

Defense

Pos.	#	Name	Class
LB	55	Ed Albright	Sr
DE	98	Jeff Bauer	Jr
LB	85	Ed Bosold	So
S	46	Ron Buss	Jr
CB	19	Chris Davis	So
S	24	Neovia Greyer	Sr
CB	41	Milt Habeck	Jr
LB	54	Brian Harney	So
LB	56	John Hoffman	So
CB	32	Greg Johnson	Sr
DT	70	Tom Koch	Jr
LB	58	Mike Levenhagen	Jr
LB	57	Dave Lokanc	Jr
DT	79	Mike Mayer	Jr
LB	59	Todd Nordwig	So
DE	87	Bill Poindexter (C)	Sr
LB	31	Bob Schlicht	Jr
DT	74	Jim Schymanski	So
DE	81	Mike Seifert	So
CB	25	Tom Shinnick	Sr
DE	78	Bob Storck	Jr
CB	29	Jim Wesley	So

Special teams

Pos.	#	Name	Class
G, K	64	Roger Jaeger (C)	Sr
FB, P	34	John Krugman	Sr

Head coach

- John Jardine

Coordinators/assistant coaches

- Paul Roach – Offensive Coordinator/Offensive Backs
- Lew Stueck – Defensive Coordinator/Linebackers
- Norm Dow – Quarterbacks
- Stan Kemp – Wide Receivers/Special Teams
- Jim Martin – Defensive Backs
- Charlie McBride – Offensive Line
- Dick Teteak – Defensive Line
- Larry Van Dusen – Offensive Line
- LaVern Van Dyke – Administrative Assistant

Legend

- (C) Team captain
- (S) Suspended
- (I) Ineligible
- Injured
- Redshirt

== 1972 NFL draft ==
Player	Position	Round	Pick	NFL club
Lance Moon	Running back	7	171	Atlanta Falcons
Greg Johnson	Defensive back	9	233	Miami Dolphins
Elbert Walker	Tackle	11	283	Kansas City Chiefs
Larry Mialik	Tight end	12	302	Atlanta Falcons
Alan Thompson	Running back	14	363	Dallas Cowboys
Neil Graff	Quarterback	16	414	Minnesota Vikings
Al Hannah	Wide receiver	16	415	Miami Dolphins
