= 1971 Indiana Hoosiers football team =

American college football season

1971 Indiana Hoosiers football
- Conference: Big Ten Conference
- Record: 3–8 (2–6 Big Ten)
- Head coach: John Pont (7th season)
- MVP: Chuck Thomson
- Captain: Chuck Thomson
- Home stadium: Seventeenth Street Stadium

1971 Big Ten Conference football standings
	Conf.					Overall
Team	W		L		T	W		L		T
No. 6 Michigan $	8	–	0	–	0	11	–	1	–	0
Northwestern	6	–	3	–	0	7	–	4	–	0
Ohio State	5	–	3	–	0	6	–	4	–	0
Michigan State	5	–	3	–	0	6	–	5	–	0
Illinois	5	–	3	–	0	5	–	6	–	0
Wisconsin	3	–	5	–	0	4	–	6	–	1
Minnesota	3	–	5	–	0	4	–	7	–	0
Purdue	3	–	5	–	0	3	–	7	–	0
Indiana	2	–	6	–	0	3	–	8	–	0
Iowa	1	–	8	–	0	1	–	10	–	0
$ – Conference champion; Rankings from AP Poll

The 1971 Indiana Hoosiers football team represented the Indiana Hoosiers in the 1971 Big Ten Conference football season. The Hoosiers played their home games at Seventeenth Street Stadium in Bloomington, Indiana. The team was coached by John Pont, in his seventh year as head coach of the Hoosiers.

== Schedule ==
Date	Opponent	Site	Result	Attendance	Source
September 11	at Minnesota	Memorial Stadium; Minneapolis, MN	L 0–28	28,549	
September 18	Kentucky*	Seventeenth Street Stadium; Bloomington, IN (rivalry)	W 26–8	41,954	
September 25	at Baylor*	Baylor Stadium; Waco, TX	L 0–10	27,500	
October 2	Syracuse*	Seventeenth Street Stadium; Bloomington, IN	L 0–7	31,989	
October 9	at Wisconsin	Camp Randall Stadium; Madison, WI	L 29–35	66,156	
October 16	No. 13 Ohio State	Seventeenth Street Stadium; Bloomington, IN	L 7–27	50,812	
October 23	Northwestern^{†}	Seventeenth Street Stadium; Bloomington, IN	L 10–24	32,409	
October 30	at No. 3 Michigan	Michigan Stadium; Ann Arbor, MI	L 7–61	75,751	
November 6	Illinois	Seventeenth Street Stadium; Bloomington, IN (rivalry)	L 21–22	23,018	
November 13	at Iowa	Iowa Stadium; Iowa City, IA	W 14–7	42,102	
November 20	Purdue	Seventeenth Street Stadium; Bloomington, IN (Old Oaken Bucket)	W 38–31	50,978	
*Non-conference game; ^{†}Homecoming; Rankings from AP Poll released prior to the game

== First one-point safety ==
The first known occurrence of a one-point safety (conversion safety) was in an NCAA game on October 2, 1971, scored by Syracuse in the first quarter of a game at Indiana. On a point-after-touchdown kick, the ball was kicked almost straight up in the air. An Indiana player illegally batted the ball in the end zone (a spot foul defensive penalty). Syracuse won the game, 7–0. The 1970 rulebook (Rule 8-5-3) stated, "If a scrimmage kick fails to cross the neutral zone, or crosses the neutral zone and is first touched by Team B, or is untouched and then rebounds into the end zone where it is recovered by Team A, it is a safety," and (8-5-4) "If the penalty for a foul committed when the ball is free leaves the ball behind a goal line, it is a safety if behind the offender's goal line."

== 1972 NFL draftees ==
Player	Position	Round	Pick	NFL club
Steve Porter	Wide receiver	14	341	Cincinnati Bengals
