= 1971 Purdue Boilermakers football team =

American college football season

1971 Purdue Boilermakers football
- Conference: Big Ten Conference
- Record: 3–7 (3–5 Big Ten)
- Head coach: Bob DeMoss (2nd season)
- MVP: Tom Luken
- Captains: Tom Luken; Jim Teal
- Home stadium: Ross–Ade Stadium

1971 Big Ten Conference football standings
	Conf.					Overall
Team	W		L		T	W		L		T
No. 6 Michigan $	8	–	0	–	0	11	–	1	–	0
Northwestern	6	–	3	–	0	7	–	4	–	0
Ohio State	5	–	3	–	0	6	–	4	–	0
Michigan State	5	–	3	–	0	6	–	5	–	0
Illinois	5	–	3	–	0	5	–	6	–	0
Wisconsin	3	–	5	–	0	4	–	6	–	1
Minnesota	3	–	5	–	0	4	–	7	–	0
Purdue	3	–	5	–	0	3	–	7	–	0
Indiana	2	–	6	–	0	3	–	8	–	0
Iowa	1	–	8	–	0	1	–	10	–	0
$ – Conference champion; Rankings from AP Poll

The 1971 Purdue Boilermakers football team represented Purdue University during the 1971 Big Ten Conference football season. Led by second-year head coach Bob DeMoss, the Boilermakers compiled an overall record of 3–7 with a mark of 3–5 in conference play, placing in a three-way tie for sixth in the Big Ten. Purdue played home games at Ross–Ade Stadium in West Lafayette, Indiana.

The Boilermakers were one of two Big Ten teams which did not play 11 regular season games, along with Ohio State, who played 10 regular season games for the first time in 1971. The NCAA approved an 11th regular season game effective for the 1970 season, but Big Ten faculty representatives and athletic directors did not allow the 11th game until this season.

== Schedule ==
Date	Opponent	Rank	Site	Result	Attendance	Source
September 18	at Washington*		Husky Stadium; Seattle, WA	L 35–38	58,500	
September 25	No. 2 Notre Dame*		Ross–Ade Stadium; West Lafayette, IN (rivalry)	L 7–8	69,765	
October 2	Iowa		Ross–Ade Stadium; West Lafayette, IN	W 45–13	63,485	
October 9	Minnesota^{†}		Ross–Ade Stadium; West Lafayette, IN	W 27–13	64,281	
October 16	at Northwestern	No. 20	Dyche Stadium; Evanston, IL	W 21–20	40,059	
October 23	at Illinois	No. 17	Memorial Stadium; Champaign, IL (rivalry)	L 7–21	52,344	
October 30	Michigan State		Ross–Ade Stadium; West Lafayette, IN	L 10–43	66,339	
November 6	at Wisconsin		Camp Randall Stadium; Madison, WI	L 10–14	78,451	
November 13	No. 3 Michigan		Ross–Ade Stadium; West Lafayette, IN	L 17–20	65,254	
November 20	at Indiana		Seventeenth Street Stadium; Bloomington, IN (Old Oaken Bucket)	L 31–38	50,978	
*Non-conference game; ^{†}Homecoming; Rankings from AP Poll released prior to the game

== Game summaries ==
=== Washington ===
- Otis Armstrong 19 rushes, 121 yards

=== Minnesota ===
- Gary Danielson 15/20 passing, 300 yards

=== Northwestern ===
- Otis Armstrong 30 rushes, 179 yards

=== Wisconsin ===
- Otis Armstrong 35 rushes, 155 yards

== Roster ==
1971 Purdue Boilermakers football team roster
Players
Coaches
Offense

Pos.	#	Name	Class
RB		Marv Adams
RB		Otis Armstrong
TE		Ashley Bell
QB		Bo Bobrowski
QB		Steve Burke
RB		Scott Clayton
TE		Mike Cota
QB	18	Gary Danielson	Jr
RB		Bob Herrick
RB		Archie Highler
OL		Bob Hoidahl
OL		Tim Huxhold
RB		Ron North
OL		Rich Ostriker
RB		Bill Pedhoretzky
WR		Dan Roman
WR		Rick Sayers
OL		Donn Smith
RB		Jack Spellman
WR		Darryl Stingley
OL		Kenneth Watkins
OL		Mike Williams

Defense

Pos.	#	Name	Class
DL		Steve Baumgartner
DL		Gregg Bingham
DL		Dave Butz
DB		Carl Capria
DB		Sammy Carter
LB		Mike Gefert
DL		Gary Hrivnak
DL		Bronco Keser
DL		Doug Molls
DB		Chuck Piebes
DB		Charlie Potts
DB		Mike Renie
LB		Rick Schavietello
LB		Jim Teal
DL		Joe Tenkman

Special teams

Pos.	#	Name	Class

Head coach

- Bob DeMoss

Coordinators/assistant coaches

- George Catavolos
- Ned Maloney
- Tony Mason
- Bo Rein
- Tom Roggeman

Legend

- (C) Team captain
- (S) Suspended
- (I) Ineligible
- Injured
- Redshirt
