= 1971 Northwestern Wildcats football team =

American college football season

1971 Northwestern Wildcats football
- Conference: Big Ten Conference
- Record: 7–4 (6–3 Big Ten)
- Head coach: Alex Agase
- Captains: Maurie Daigneau; Eric Hutchinson
- Home stadium: Dyche Stadium

1971 Big Ten Conference football standings
	Conf.					Overall
Team	W		L		T	W		L		T
No. 6 Michigan $	8	–	0	–	0	11	–	1	–	0
Northwestern	6	–	3	–	0	7	–	4	–	0
Ohio State	5	–	3	–	0	6	–	4	–	0
Michigan State	5	–	3	–	0	6	–	5	–	0
Illinois	5	–	3	–	0	5	–	6	–	0
Wisconsin	3	–	5	–	0	4	–	6	–	1
Minnesota	3	–	5	–	0	4	–	7	–	0
Purdue	3	–	5	–	0	3	–	7	–	0
Indiana	2	–	6	–	0	3	–	8	–	0
Iowa	1	–	8	–	0	1	–	10	–	0
$ – Conference champion; Rankings from AP Poll

The 1971 Northwestern Wildcats team represented Northwestern University during the 1971 Big Ten Conference football season. In their eighth year under head coach Alex Agase, the Wildcats compiled a 7–4 record (6–3 against Big Ten Conference opponents) and finished in second place in the Big Ten Conference.

The team's offensive leaders were quarterback Maurie Daigneau with 1,733 passing yards, Al Robinson with 881 rushing yards, and Barry Pearson with 674 receiving yards. Ten Northwestern players received honors on the 1971 All-Big Ten Conference football team. They are: (1) Maurie Daigneau (AP-1; UPI-1); (2) running back Al Robinson (AP-2); (3) wide receiver Barry Pearson (AP-1; UPI-1); (4) offensive tackle Tom McCreight (AP-1); (5) defensive end Wil Hemby (UPI-2); (6) defensive tackle Jim Anderson (UPI-2); (7) linebacker John Voorhees (AP-2); and defensive ends (8) Eric Hutchinson (AP-1; UPI-1); (9) Jerry Brown (AP-2); and (10) Jack Dustin (UPI-2). Eric Hutchinson was also selected as a first-team All-American by the Football Writers Association of America.

This was Northwestern's last winning season until the miraculous 1995 campaign when the Wildcats won the Big Ten championship outright by going undefeated in the conference (8–0), and played in the Rose Bowl.

== Schedule ==
Date	Opponent	Rank	Site	Result	Attendance	Source
September 11	No. 4 Michigan	No. 20	Dyche Stadium; Evanston, IL (rivalry)	L 6–21	42,472	
September 18	at No. 2 Notre Dame*		Notre Dame Stadium; Notre Dame, IN (rivalry)	L 7–50	59,075	
September 25	Syracuse*		Dyche Stadium; Evanston, IL	W 12–6	27,529	
October 2	Wisconsin		Dyche Stadium; Evanston, IL	W 24–11	40,473	
October 9	at Iowa		Iowa Stadium; Iowa City, IA	W 28–3	53,102	
October 16	No. 20 Purdue		Dyche Stadium; Evanston, IL	L 20–21	40,059	
October 23	at Indiana		Seventeenth Street Stadium; Bloomington, IN	W 24–10	32,409	
October 30	at Illinois		Memorial Stadium; Champaign, IL (rivalry)	L 7–24	40,144	
November 6	Minnesota		Dyche Stadium; Evanston, IL	W 41–20	31,217	
November 13	at No. 16 Ohio State		Ohio Stadium; Columbus, OH	W 14–10	86,062	
November 20	No. 19 Michigan State		Dyche Stadium; Evanston, IL	W 28–7	30,012	
*Non-conference game; Rankings from AP Poll released prior to the game

== Roster ==
1971 Northwestern Wildcats football team roster
Players
Coaches
Offense

Pos.	#	Name	Class
TE	84	Steve Craig	So
QB	12	Maurie Daigneau (C)	Sr
G	67	Tom Dickinson	Sr
C	50	Dave Dybas	Jr
FB	30	Mark Fassbender	Jr
OT	71	Paul Gary	Sr
OT	75	Dave Glantz	Jr
WR	28	Steve Harris	So
OT	64	Donnie Haynes	So
WR	86	Jim Lash	So
TE	80	Frank Lutostanski	So
G	68	Tom McCreight	Sr
WR	44	A. J. Owens	Jr
WR	21	Barry Pearson	Sr
C	53	Ed Quaerna	Jr

Defense

Pos.	#	Name	Class
DT	74	Jim Anderson	Jr
LB	55	John Buckley	So
DT	79	Wayne Bryan	Sr
DB	42	Jerry Brown	Sr
DB	29	Mike Coughlin	Sr
DB	27	Jack Dustin	Sr
DE	89	Wil Hemby	Sr
DB	32	Eric Hutchinson	Sr
DE	58	George Keporos	Sr
DT	60	Pat Kershaw	Sr
LB	99	Dave McCreery	So
LB	82	Pat McNamara	Jr
DT	77	Dale Mize	So
LB	88	Mike Morkin	Sr
DB	15	Greg Swanson	So
LB	35	Phil Trembczynski	So
LB	66	Mike Varty	So
LB	40	John Vorhees	Sr

Special teams

Pos.	#	Name	Class
K	48	Ed Planisek	Sr
P	9	Dave Skarin	So

Head coach

- Alex Agase

Coordinators/assistant coaches

- Ron Marciniak – Offensive line

Legend

- (C) Team captain
- (S) Suspended
- (I) Ineligible
- Injured
- Redshirt
