= 1971 Iowa Hawkeyes football team =

American college football season

1971 Iowa Hawkeyes football
- Conference: Big Ten Conference
- Record: 1–10 (1–8 Big Ten)
- Head coach: Frank Lauterbur (1st season)
- MVP: Craig Clemons
- Captains: Geoff Michelosen; Craig Clemons
- Home stadium: Iowa Stadium

1971 Big Ten Conference football standings
	Conf.					Overall
Team	W		L		T	W		L		T
No. 6 Michigan $	8	–	0	–	0	11	–	1	–	0
Northwestern	6	–	3	–	0	7	–	4	–	0
Ohio State	5	–	3	–	0	6	–	4	–	0
Michigan State	5	–	3	–	0	6	–	5	–	0
Illinois	5	–	3	–	0	5	–	6	–	0
Wisconsin	3	–	5	–	0	4	–	6	–	1
Minnesota	3	–	5	–	0	4	–	7	–	0
Purdue	3	–	5	–	0	3	–	7	–	0
Indiana	2	–	6	–	0	3	–	8	–	0
Iowa	1	–	8	–	0	1	–	10	–	0
$ – Conference champion; Rankings from AP Poll

The 1971 Iowa Hawkeyes football team was an American football team that represented the University of Iowa as a member of the Big Ten Conference during the 1971 Big Ten football season. In their first year under head coach Frank Lauterbur, the Hawkeyes compiled a 1–10 record (1–8 in conference game), finished in last place in the Big Ten, and were outscored by a total of 379 to 121.

The 1971 Hawkeyes gained 897 rushing yards and 1,495 passing yards. On defense, they gave up 3,572 rushing yards and 1,400 passing yards. They gave up 324.7 rushing yards per game.

The team's statistical leaders included Frank Sunderman (109-of-235 passing, 1,297 yards), Levi Mitchell (623 rushing yards), Dave Triplett (28 receptions for 426 yards), Harry Kokolus (25 points scored), and Dave Simms (139 total tackles). Cornerback Craig Clemons was a first-team All-American. Clemons and Geoff Michelosen were the team captains. Clemons was also selected as the team's most valuable player.

The team played its home games at Iowa Stadium in Iowa City, Iowa. Home attendance totaled 233,150, an average of 46,630 per game.

== Schedule ==
Date	Opponent	Site	TV	Result	Attendance	Source
September 11	at No. 11 Ohio State	Ohio Stadium; Columbus, OH		L 21–52	75,596	
September 18	at Oregon State*	Parker Stadium; Corvallis, OR		L 19–33	24,092	
September 25	No. 12 Penn State*	Iowa Stadium; Iowa City, IA	ABC	L 14–44	44,303	
October 2	at Purdue	Ross–Ade Stadium; West Lafayette, IL		L 13–45	63,485	
October 9	Northwestern^{†}	Iowa Stadium; Iowa City, IA		L 3–28	53,102	
October 16	Minnesota	Iowa Stadium; Iowa City, IA (rivalry)		L 14–19	51,488	
October 23	at Michigan State	Spartan Stadium; East Lansing, MI		L 3–34	60,383	
October 30	Wisconsin	Iowa Stadium; Iowa City, IA		W 20–16	43,155	
November 6	at No. 3 Michigan	Michigan Stadium; Ann Arbor, MI		L 7–63	72,467	
November 13	Indiana	Iowa Stadium; Iowa City, IA		L 7–14	42,102	
November 20	at Illinois	Memorial Stadium; Champaign, IL		L 0–31	40,703	
*Non-conference game; ^{†}Homecoming; Rankings from AP Poll released prior to the game

== Roster ==
1971 Iowa Hawkeyes football team roster
Players
Coaches
Offense

Pos.	#	Name	Class
RB	10	Levi Mitchell	Sr
QB	11	Kyle Skogman	Jr
FL	12	Dave Harris	Jr
QB	13	Frank Sunderman	Jr
QB	14	Ron Hayes	So
QB	15	Rob Fick	So
RB	17	Kim Hardt	So
FL	21	Jerry Reardon	Jr
FL	27	Tony Major	Sr
RB	29	Steve Penney	Sr
FB	31	Frank Holmes	Sr
FB	33	Bob Sims	Jr
TE	36	Tom Cabalka	Jr
G	38	Paul Jurca	Jr
G	39	Karl Hoinkes	Jr
RB	44	Harold Johnson	So
WR	47	Dave Triplett	Sr
C	50	Clark Malmer	Sr
G	51	Mark Nelson	So
C	55	Pat Long	So
C	58	Joe Ritchie	Jr
G	60	Geoff Mickelson	Sr
G	61	Rich Lutz	Jr
G	64	John Farrell	Jr
OT	67	Don Presson	Jr
G	69	Lorin Lynch	Sr
OT	71	Jim Kaiser	Sr
OT	72	Craig Darling	Jr
OT	74	Jim Begale	Jr
OT	76	Wendell Bell	Sr
G	79	Kelly Disser	Sr
OT	81	Todd Watson	Jr
WR	83	Brian Rollins	So
TE	85	Ed Morrissey	So
TE	89	Don Osby	Sr

Defense

Pos.	#	Name	Class
DB	16	Craig Johnson	Jr
DB	18	Alan Schaefer	Sr
DB	19	Bill Schoonover	Jr
DB	20	Wayne Holloway	Jr
DB	23	Charles Cross	Jr
DE	25	Ike White	Jr
DB	26	Al Matthews	Jr
DB	30	Mike Wendling	Jr
DB	32	Bruce Stromberg	Jr
LB	34	Rich Byard	Jr
LB	35	Dave Simms	Jr
DB	40	Rick Brooks	So
DB	43	Craig Clemons (C)	Sr
DB	41	Tom Halleckson	So
DB	45	Rich Solomon	Sr
DB	46	Jerry Johnson	Sr
LB	49	Roger Jerrick	So
LB	53	Harry Young	So
DT	63	Marvin Glasgow	Jr
DE	65	Dean Drenzek	Jr
LB	66	Murphy Anderson	So
DT	70	Charles Podolak	Sr
DT	75	Jim Waschek	So
DT	77	Ron Conatser	So
DT	78	Ernie Roberson	So
DE	84	Kent Rinaberger	So
DE	87	Dan Dickel	So
DE	88	Mike Dillner	Jr
DE	90	Larry Horton	Sr

Special teams

Pos.	#	Name	Class
PK	22	Harry Kokolus	So
PK	28	Mike Cooper	Jr

Head coach

- Frank Lauterbur

Coordinators/assistant coaches

- Jack Harbaugh

Legend

- (C) Team captain
- (S) Suspended
- (I) Ineligible
- Injured
- Redshirt
