= 1971 Minnesota Golden Gophers football team =

American college football season

1971 Minnesota Golden Gophers football
- Conference: Big Ten Conference
- Record: 4–7 (3–5 Big Ten)
- Head coach: Murray Warmath (18th season)
- MVP: Tom Chandler
- Captain: Bill Light
- Home stadium: Memorial Stadium

1971 Big Ten Conference football standings
	Conf.					Overall
Team	W		L		T	W		L		T
No. 6 Michigan $	8	–	0	–	0	11	–	1	–	0
Northwestern	6	–	3	–	0	7	–	4	–	0
Ohio State	5	–	3	–	0	6	–	4	–	0
Michigan State	5	–	3	–	0	6	–	5	–	0
Illinois	5	–	3	–	0	5	–	6	–	0
Wisconsin	3	–	5	–	0	4	–	6	–	1
Minnesota	3	–	5	–	0	4	–	7	–	0
Purdue	3	–	5	–	0	3	–	7	–	0
Indiana	2	–	6	–	0	3	–	8	–	0
Iowa	1	–	8	–	0	1	–	10	–	0
$ – Conference champion; Rankings from AP Poll

The 1971 Minnesota Golden Gophers football team represented the University of Minnesota in the 1971 Big Ten Conference football season. In their 18th and final year under head coach Murray Warmath, the Golden Gophers compiled a 4–7 record and were outscored by their opponents by a combined total of 278 to 212.

Defensive end Tom Chandler received the team's Most Valuable Player award. End Doug Kingsriter was named an All-American by the Associated Press and Bob Hope. Kingsriter and linebacker Bill Light were named All-Big Ten first team. Quarterback Craig Curry, fullback Ernie Cook and offensive tackle Jack Babcock were named All-Big Ten second team. Offensive lineman Bart Buetow and linebacker Ron King were named Academic All-Big Ten.

Total attendance for the season was 207,662, which averaged to 34,610. The season high for attendance was against Michigan.

== Schedule ==
Date	Opponent	Site	Result	Attendance	Source
September 11	Indiana	Memorial Stadium; Minneapolis, MN	W 28–0	28,549	
September 18	at No. 1 Nebraska*	Memorial Stadium; Lincoln, NE (rivalry)	L 7–35	68,187	
September 25	Washington State*	Memorial Stadium; Minneapolis, MN	L 20–31	32,020	
October 2	Kansas*	Memorial Stadium; Minneapolis, MN	W 38–20	30,090	
October 9	at Purdue	Ross–Ade Stadium; West Lafayette, IN	L 13–27	64,281	
October 16	at Iowa	Iowa Stadium; Iowa City, IA (rivalry)	W 19–14	51,488	
October 23	No. 3 Michigan^{†}	Memorial Stadium; Minneapolis, MN (Little Brown Jug)	L 7–35	44,176	
October 30	No. 10 Ohio State	Memorial Stadium; Minneapolis, MN	L 12–14	36,281	
November 6	at Northwestern	Dyche Stadium; Evanston, IL	L 20–41	31,217	
November 13	at Michigan State	Spartan Stadium; East Lansing, MI	L 25–40	61,419	
November 20	Wisconsin	Memorial Stadium; Minneapolis, MN (rivalry)	W 23–21	34,738	
*Non-conference game; ^{†}Homecoming; Rankings from AP Poll released prior to the game

== Roster ==
1971 Minnesota Golden Gophers football team roster
Players
Coaches
Offense

Pos.	#	Name	Class
QB	10	Craig Curry	Sr
OT	72	Matt Herkenhoff	So
TE	83	Doug Kingsriter	Jr

Defense

Pos.	#	Name	Class
DT	91	Dan Adams	So
LB	33	Tom MacLeod	Jr

Special teams

Pos.	#	Name	Class

Head coach

- Murray Warmath

Coordinators/assistant coaches

Legend

- (C) Team captain
- (S) Suspended
- (I) Ineligible
- Injured
- Redshirt
