= 1971 Illinois Fighting Illini football team =

American college football season

1971 Illinois Fighting Illini football
- Conference: Big Ten Conference
- Record: 5–6 (5–3 Big Ten)
- Head coach: Bob Blackman (1st season)
- MVP: Terry Masar
- Captains: Glenn Collier; Larry McCarren
- Home stadium: Memorial Stadium

1971 Big Ten Conference football standings
	Conf.					Overall
Team	W		L		T	W		L		T
No. 6 Michigan $	8	–	0	–	0	11	–	1	–	0
Northwestern	6	–	3	–	0	7	–	4	–	0
Ohio State	5	–	3	–	0	6	–	4	–	0
Michigan State	5	–	3	–	0	6	–	5	–	0
Illinois	5	–	3	–	0	5	–	6	–	0
Wisconsin	3	–	5	–	0	4	–	6	–	1
Minnesota	3	–	5	–	0	4	–	7	–	0
Purdue	3	–	5	–	0	3	–	7	–	0
Indiana	2	–	6	–	0	3	–	8	–	0
Iowa	1	–	8	–	0	1	–	10	–	0
$ – Conference champion; Rankings from AP Poll

The 1971 Illinois Fighting Illini football team was an American football team that represented the University of Illinois as a member of the Big Ten Conference during the 1971 Big Ten season. In their first year under head coach Bob Blackman, the Illini compiled a 5–6 record (5–3 in conference games), finished in a three-way tie for third place in the Big Ten, and were outcored by a total of 238 to 163.

The team's statistical leaders included quarterback Mike Wells (1,007 passing yards, 46.9%), running back John Wilson (543 rushing yards, 4.7 yards per carry), and wide receiver Garvin Roberson (28 receptions for 372 yards). Punter/halfback Terry Masar was selected as the team's most valuable player. Defensive end Tab Bennett was selected as a first-team player on the 1971 All-Big Ten Conference football team.

The team played its home games at Memorial Stadium in Champaign, Illinois.

== Schedule ==
Date	Opponent	Site	Result	Attendance	Source
September 11	at Michigan State	Spartan Stadium; East Lansing, MI	L 0–10	42,083	
September 18	North Carolina*	Memorial Stadium; Champaign, IL	L 0–27	49,591	
September 25	at No. 16 USC*	Los Angeles Memorial Coliseum; Los Angeles, CA	L 0–28	49,390	
October 2	No. 15 Washington*	Memorial Stadium; Champaign, IL	L 14–52	48,127	
October 9	No. 15 Ohio State	Memorial Stadium; Champaign, IL (Illibuck)	L 10–24	53,555	
October 16	at No. 3 Michigan	Michigan Stadium; Ann Arbor, MI (rivalry)	L 6–35	73,406	
October 23	No. 17 Purdue	Memorial Stadium; Champaign, IL (rivalry)	W 21–7	52,344	
October 30	Northwestern	Memorial Stadium; Champaign, IL (rivalry)	W 24–7	40,144	
November 6	at Indiana	Seventeenth Street Stadium; Bloomington, IN (rivalry)	W 22–21	23,018	
November 13	at Wisconsin	Camp Randall Stadium; Madison, WI	W 35–27	65,459	
November 20	Iowa	Memorial Stadium; Champaign, IL	W 31–0	40,703	
*Non-conference game; Rankings from AP Poll released prior to the game

== Roster ==
1971 Illinois Fighting Illini football team roster
Players
Coaches
Offense

Pos.	#	Name	Class
OT	76	Mike Dobrzeniecki	Jr
OT	73	Bruce Dobson	So
OT	79	Dennis Driscoll	Jr
TE	86	Bob Dubrish	So
G	64	Bob Elledge	Jr
G	56	John Gann	So
C	54	Larry McCarren	Jr
C	51	Gerry Sullivan	So
QB	12	Mike Wells	Jr

Defense

Pos.	#	Name	Class
LB	52	Larry Allen	Jr
DE	75	Tab Bennett	Jr
DB	24	Jamie Dufelmeier	Sr

Special teams

Pos.	#	Name	Class

Head coach

- Bob Blackman

Coordinators/assistant coaches

Legend

- (C) Team captain
- (S) Suspended
- (I) Ineligible
- Injured
- Redshirt

Roster
