= Bob DeMoss =

American football player, coach, and administrator (1927–2017)

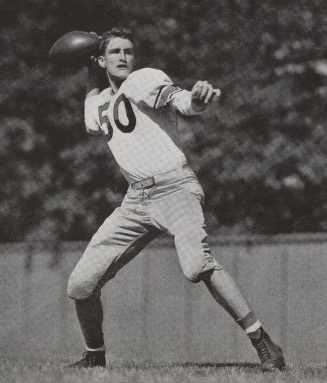
- DeMoss from the 1947 Purdue yearbook

No. 16
- Position: Quarterback

Personal information
- Born: January 27, 1927; Dayton, Kentucky, U.S.
- Died: July 23, 2017 (aged 90); West Lafayette, Indiana, U.S.
- Listed height: 6 ft 2 in (1.88 m)
- Listed weight: 175 lb (79 kg)

Career information
- High school: Dayton (KY)
- College: Purdue (1945–1948)
- NFL draft: 1950: 22nd round, 280th overall pick

Career history

Playing
- New York Bulldogs (1949)

Coaching
- Purdue (1950–1969) Assistant; Purdue (1970–1972) Head coach

Awards and highlights
- Second-team All-Big Ten (1945)

Career NFL statistics
- Passing attempts: 18
- Passing completions: 6
- Completion percentage: 33.3%
- TD–INT: 0–2
- Passing yards: 60
- Passer rating: 4.2
- Stats at Pro Football Reference

Head coaching record
- Regular season: 13–18–0 (.419)

Robert Alonzo DeMoss (January 27, 1927 – July 23, 2017) was an American professional football player, coach, and college athletics administrator. He served as the head football coach at Purdue University from 1970 to 1972, compiling a career college football record of 13–18.

== Early life ==
DeMoss was born on January 27, 1927, in Dayton, Kentucky. He earned a bachelor's degree in forestry during his college years at Purdue University.

== Career ==
=== Football playing ===
DeMoss played football as a quarterback at Purdue from 1945 to 1948. He helped the Boilermakers win their first four games and move into the national rankings at No. 9. The next week, he led the Boilermakers into Ohio Stadium, where they routed the #4 team in the country, 35–13 He was then selected in the second round of the 1949 NFL draft by the New York Bulldogs, for whom he played in 1949. DeMoss was selected again in the 22nd round of the 1950 NFL draft by the New York Giants, but retired from playing to become an assistant football coach at Purdue.

=== Assistant coach ===
For 20 years, beginning in 1950, DeMoss was an assistant football coach where he was credited with developing Purdue's reputation as the 'cradle of quarterbacks,' having recruited and coached the likes of Dale Samuels, Len Dawson, Bernie Allen, Bob Griese, Mike Phipps and Gary Danielson. As assistant athletics director, DeMoss oversaw the baseball, men's cross country, men's golf, men's swimming and diving, men's tennis, men's track and field, and wrestling programs.

=== Purdue head coach ===
In 1970, DeMoss replaced Jack Mollenkopf as head coach. Two days after Mollenkopf announced his retirement, DeMoss was named his successor, becoming the third and most-recent Purdue alum to serve as head coach. DeMoss inherited a Purdue squad who was loaded at the running back position with Stan Brown, and Otis Armstrong, but the team struggled to find consistency out of its quarterback position. DeMoss resigned following the 1972 season, citing his desire to be with his family more as his reason for stepping down. DeMoss compiled a career college football record of 13–18.

In DeMoss' three seasons as head coach, the Boilermakers posted an 11–12 Big Ten mark. On October 3, 1970, Purdue upset third-ranked Stanford University with a 26–14 scoring on the road, earning DeMoss Coach of the Week laurels by United Press International. DeMoss resigned as coach on December 3, 1972, making him the last quarterback to coach the Boilermakers until Jeff Brohm.

After his stint as Purdue's head football coach, DeMoss remained an assistant athletics director at Purdue until his retirement in 1992. In September 2008 the Purdue athletics department honored Bob DeMoss with the unveiling of a placard bearing his name for the offensive staff room in the football offices of the Mollenkopf Athletic Center.

== Honors ==
DeMoss was inducted into Purdue's Intercollegiate Athletes Hall of Fame as part of the Class of 1999.

== Personal life ==
DeMoss was married to Janet DeMoss. They had three children. DeMoss died at his home in West Lafayette, Indiana, on July 23, 2017, at the age of 90.

== Head coaching record ==
Year	Team	Overall	Conference	Standing	Bowl/playoffs
Purdue Boilermakers (Big Ten Conference) (1970–1972)
1970	Purdue	4–6	2–5	8th	
1971	Purdue	3–7	3–5	T–6th	
1972	Purdue	6–5	6–2	3rd	
Purdue:		13–18	11–12		
Total:		13–18			
