= Guy Murdock =

American football player (born 1950)

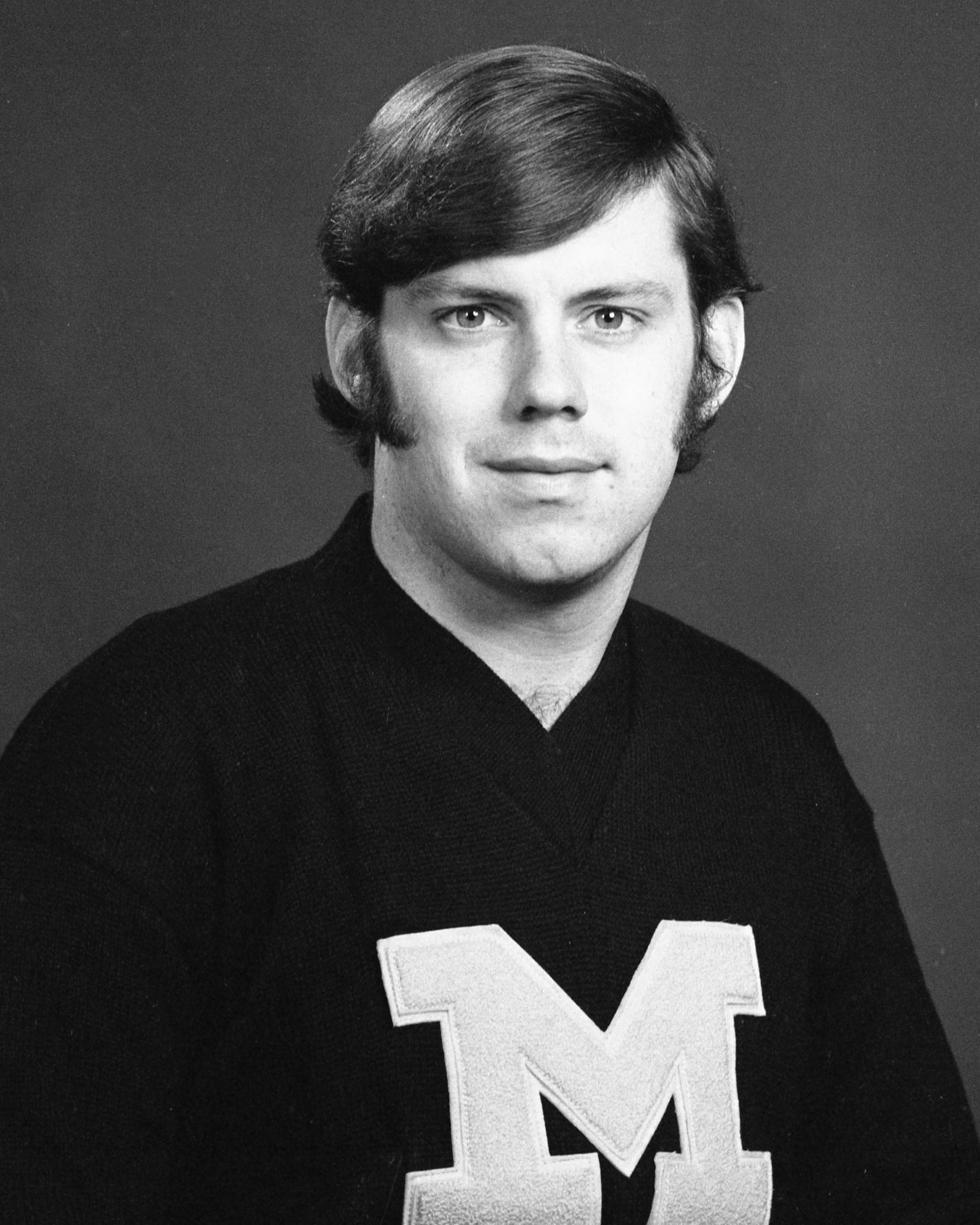
- Murdock in 1971

Profile
- Position: Offensive lineman

Personal information
- Born: June 27, 1950 (age 76); Chicago, Illinois, U.S.

Career information
- College: Michigan
- NFL draft: 1972: 16th round, 396th overall pick

Career history
- 1972: Houston Oilers
- 1974: Chicago Fire
- 1975: Chicago Winds

Awards and highlights
- 2× First-team All-Big Ten (1969, 1970); Second-team All-Big Ten (1971)
- Stats at Pro Football Reference

Guy Boyd Murdock (born June 27, 1950) is an American former professional football player who was a center for the Houston Oilers of the National Football League (NFL) in 1972. He was named to the NFL All-Rookie team. He also played for the Chicago Fire and Chicago Winds of the World Football League (WFL) in 1974 and 1975. He was selected as the Fire's most valuable player in 1974.

Murdock played college football for the Michigan Wolverines from 1969 to 1971. He was selected as a first-team All-Big Ten Conference center in both 1969 and 1970 and was a co-captain of the 1971 Michigan Wolverines football team. The 1971 team with Murdock as co-captain finished the regular season undefeated before losing to Stanford by a 13–12 score in the 1972 Rose Bowl. During Murdock's three seasons as Michigan's starting center, the team compiled a record of 28–5.

== Early life ==
Murdock was born in Chicago in 1950 and grew up in Barrington, Illinois. He graduated from Barrington High School.

== Michigan ==
Murdock enrolled at the University of Michigan in 1968 and played on the all-freshman football team. As a sophomore, Murdock became the starting center for the 1969 Michigan Wolverines football team, the first Michigan team coached by Bo Schembechler. Murdock started seven games at center and was selected as an All-Big Ten Conference player.

As a junior, Murdock was again the starting center for the 1970 Michigan team. He started all 10 games for the Wolverines and was selected as an All-Big Ten center for the second consecutive season.

As a senior, Murdock was chosen as a co-captain of the 1971 Michigan Wolverines football team and started all 12 games at the center position. He also received the 1971 Meyer Morton Award as the player showing the greatest development and most promise as a result of spring practice.

Murdock graduated from the university in 1972 with a Bachelor of Science degree in mathematics.

== Professional football ==
=== Houston Oilers ===
Murdock was selected by the Houston Oilers in the 16th round (396th overall pick) of the 1972 NFL draft. He appeared in 14 games for the Oilers during the 1972 NFL season. Despite being named to the UPI's NFL All-Rookie team, he was cut by the Oilers after the 1972 season. Murdock later recalled that the Oilers had "phobias about weight" and insisted that he increase his weight from 220 pounds to 245 pounds. Murdock complied but noted, "I played at 245, but I felt slow and overweight and fat." He noted, "Bo Schembechler wants you lean and trim and without fat . . . so we had no weight-building bulk project at Michigan."

=== Chicago Fire and Winds ===
After being released by the Oilers, Murdock worked as an eighth grade math teacher in Houston. He received a second opportunity to play professional football when the World Football League was formed for the 1974 season. Murdock played at the center position for the Chicago Fire and was honored with the team's most valuable player award. The Chicago Tribune wrote that Murdock was "regarded as the most adept blocker on the line."

The Fire disbanded after the 1974 WFL season, but a new franchise, called the Chicago Winds, was formed. In May 1975, Murdock signed to play for the Winds. He played for the Winds during the 1975 season, but the team folded after two of the owners withdrew their investment.
