= Mike Keller =

American football player and executive (born 1949)

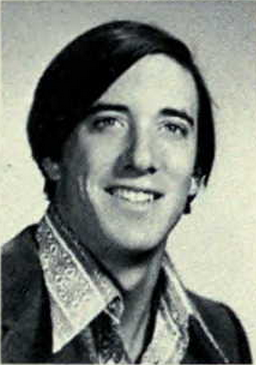
- Keller from 1972 Michiganensian

No. 57
- Position: Linebacker

Personal information
- Born: December 13, 1949 (age 76); Chicago, Illinois, U.S.
- Listed height: 6 ft 4 in (1.93 m)
- Listed weight: 221 lb (100 kg)

Career information
- High school: Catholic Central (Grand Rapids, Michigan)
- College: Michigan
- NFL draft: 1972: 3rd round, 64th overall pick

Career history
- Dallas Cowboys (1972–1973)

Awards and highlights
- Third-team All-American (1971); First-team All-Big Ten (1971); Second-team All-Big Ten (1970)

Career NFL statistics
- Games played: 5
- Stats at Pro Football Reference

Michael F. Keller (born December 13, 1949) is an American former professional football executive and former player. He played as a linebacker for the Dallas Cowboys of the National Football League (NFL). He played college football for the Michigan Wolverines.

== Early life ==
A native of Chicago, Illinois, he attended Catholic Central High School in Grand Rapids, Michigan.

== College career ==
Keller played college football at the University of Michigan and became a three-year starter at defensive end from 1969 to 1971. As a senior, he started all 11 games and the 1972 Rose Bowl for a team that finished the season with an 11–1 record and ranked No. 6 in the final AP Poll.

He was selected as an All-Big Ten player in 1971 as well as Associated Press third-team All-American. In July 1972, Keller was selected to play against the Dallas Cowboys in the annual Chicago College All-Star Game, along with Michigan teammates Thom Darden, Reggie McKenzie and Mike Taylor.

== Professional career ==
Keller was selected by the Dallas Cowboys in the third round (64th overall pick) of the 1972 NFL draft, with the intention of converting him into a linebacker. As a rookie, he was a backup outside linebacker and appeared in five games, before being sent to the taxi squad to make room to activate Roger Staubach.

He underwent shoulder surgery in 1973 and was placed on the injured reserve list on September 10. He worked in the team's scouting department, while he was recovering from surgery.

He was sidelined again the next year after suffering a pulled stomach muscle. Keller later recalled: "I got hurt in training camp in my second year. I had beaten out another player for the strong-side linebacker position, but I had to have shoulder surgery. That put me out for the season. It also led to a different career". He was waived on September 10, 1974.

== Business career ==
After retiring as a football player in 1974, Keller had a career in sports management and consulting. He began his management work as an employee of the Dallas Cowboys' personnel department. In 1975 Keller left the Cowboys to join the newly formed Seattle Seahawks as a scout and Assistant Personnel Director. He was promoted in 1978 to Assistant General Manager for the Seahawks.

From 1983 to 1985, Keller worked in the front office of the Michigan Panthers of the newly formed USFL as the team's Assistant General Manager and Director of Football Operations, He was the personnel director for the Oakland Invaders of the USFL in 1985. After the USFL dismantled, Keller worked for a time has a scout for the Dallas Cowboys.

Since 1988, Keller and his company, Keller Enterprises/RFL Llc, was engaged in sports management and consulting. His clients have included rodeo and rugby leagues, as well as a professional football league planning to play its games in the spring. From 1990 to 1992, he was the general manager of the Sacramento Surge in the fledgling World League of American Football. From 1995 to 1996, he was the general manager of the Scottish Claymores in the NFL Europe.

In January 2000, when WWF owner Vince McMahon ventured into the professional football business to form the XFL, he hired Keller as the league's vice president of football operations. In May 2000, Keller told reporters, "All the best players in the world not playing in the NFL will be playing in the XFL." The XFL began its inaugural season in February 2001 and folded in May 2001.

Beginning in March 2003, he was the chief operating officer of the American Rugby Football League LLC. Keller noted, "I consult on start-ups. I've become sort of a start-up guru." From 2013 to 2014, Keller was the Chief Operating Officer of the A11FL.

== Personal life ==
Keller and his wife, Kimberly, have two grown children, Jessica and Sam. His son Sam Keller played college football as a quarterback for Arizona State University from 2003 to 2005 and for Nebraska in 2007.
