= Jerry Markbreit =

American football official (born 1935)

- Born: March 23, 1935 (age 90); Chicago, Illinois, U.S.
- Education: University of Illinois at Urbana-Champaign
- Occupation: NFL official (1976–1998)
- Spouse: Roberta Weiner (m. 1956)

Jerry Markbreit (born March 23, 1935) is a former American football referee in the National Football League (NFL) for 23 seasons and became one of the most recognizable referees in the game. Markbreit officiated football games for 33 seasons. From 1965 to 1975, Markbreit officiated college football games in the Big Ten Conference. He then joined the NFL in 1976 as a line judge on the crew of Tommy Bell before being promoted to the head referee position in just his second year. His uniform number in the league was 9, which was later worn by Mark Perlman.

In his 23 seasons in the NFL (he retired after the 1998 season), Markbreit had 25 postseason assignments: two wild card games (1991 and 1994), 10 divisional games (1979, 1981, 1982, 1985, 1986, 1987, 1988, 1995, 1997, 1998), eight conference championships (1980, 1983, 1984, 1989, 1990, 1992, 1993, 1996), one Pro Bowl (1978), and four Super Bowls (XVII, XXI, XXVI, XXIX) and was an alternate in Super Bowl XIX, Super Bowl XXII, and Super Bowl XXVIII. To date, he is the only NFL head referee to officiate four Super Bowl games.

Until 2008, he wrote a weekly sports column for the Chicago Tribune during the football season.

== Career ==
Markbreit began officiating in intramural college fraternity games 1953, after nearly being seriously injured several times attempting to play college football at the University of Illinois.

Markbreit began officiating as a career in 1957, when he joined the Central Officials Association, and began working public league and junior varsity games. By the late 1950s, Markbreit was officiating high school games, including several with the teenage Dick Butkus.

Markbreit officiated his first Big Ten game (at back judge), Northwestern at Indiana on September 25, 1965. He joined the Big Ten as a full-time back judge in 1966, and in 1968, was promoted to referee after taking charge of a 1967 game between Missouri and Northwestern at Evanston, Illinois, a few miles from his residence in Skokie.

He served as the back judge in the "Game of the Century" on November 19, 1966, between top-ranked Notre Dame and second-ranked Michigan State which ended in a 10–10 tie. He was referee for the 1969 Ohio State vs. Michigan football game, a 24-12 Michigan upset, and also the Rose Bowl on New Year's Day 1972 between Stanford and Michigan, which the Indians won 13–12 to deny the Wolverines a perfect season.

Two members of Markbreit's 1971 crew, Dale Orem and Bill Quinby, would later be members of Markbreit's crews in the NFL.

Just before the beginning of the 1968 football season, Markbreit was offered (and declined) an early job offer from the NFL as a field judge (renamed to back judge in 1998). He felt that his lack of college experience would prevent him from obtaining the referee position in the NFL (although future NFL referee Walt Coleman did not have experience as a collegiate referee prior to his promotion to crew chief in 1995).

For the third time in four seasons, Markbreit officiated the annual Michigan-Ohio State rivalry game at Ann Arbor on November 20, 1971. Late in that game, furious over what he thought was a missed defensive pass interference foul against Michigan All-American Thom Darden, Buckeyes coach Woody Hayes stormed onto the field, launched a profanity-laced tirade at Markbreit, tore up the sideline markers, threw the penalty flag into the crowd, began destroying the yard markers and threw the first-down marker into the ground like a javelin before being restrained by Buckeyes team officials. Hayes was suspended for one game and fined $1,000 by Big Ten commissioner Wayne Duke. Moments after Hayes' tirade, Markbreit ejected Buckeyes linebacker Randy Gradishar for punching Michigan quarterback Tom Slade through his face mask, triggering a 10-minute brawl. He did not officiate the Ohio State-Michigan game again until November 22, 1975, his last game as a Big Ten official. His last collegiate game was one week later in Cedar Falls, Iowa, a Division II playoff game between Western Kentucky and Northern Iowa played in a driving rainstorm. It was the last outdoor football game at UNI before the opening of the UNI Dome.

Markbreit joined the NFL as a line judge in 1976, and became a referee in 1977 upon the retirement of long-time referee Tommy Bell, who was Markbreit's crew chief during the 1976 season. The other members of Bell's crew—umpire Gordon Wells, head linesman Ray Dodez, back judge Tom Kelleher and field judge Ed Merrifield—asked NFL supervisor of officials Art McNally to leave the crew intact and they would "bring Jerry along," and McNally did, with Bill Reynolds replacing Markbreit as line judge. Markbreit retired from the field after working a playoff game between the San Francisco 49ers and Atlanta Falcons on January 9, 1999.

Markbreit officiated the Holy Roller play, a game-winning play executed by the Oakland Raiders against the San Diego Chargers on September 10, 1978. With 10 seconds left in the game, Raiders quarterback Ken Stabler lost the ball, and it rolled forward towards the San Diego goal line. Raiders tight end Dave Casper batted and kicked the ball into the end zone, where he fell on it for the game-tying touchdown as time ran out. The Raiders won, 21–20. Markbreit ruled that Stabler fumbled the ball instead of intentionally throwing a forward pass, and the league backed up the call. A subsequent rule change permits only the fumbling player on offense to advance a fumble on fourth down or in the last two minutes of a half. Among NFL officials, it is still known as the "Markbreit rule."

In November 1986, Markbreit was the referee at Soldier Field when the Green Bay Packers visited to play the Chicago Bears. He ejected Packers defensive end Charles Martin after he bodyslammed Jim McMahon shoulder-first into the AstroTurf. It was Markbreit's first ejection as an NFL official. Martin was suspended for two games by NFL commissioner Pete Rozelle, the longest suspension for an on-field incident at the time (the record is now 12 games, imposed upon then-Raiders linebacker Vontaze Burfict for repeated violent acts, including illegal hits on Colts players Jack Doyle and Nyheim Hines in the same game). Years later, Markbreit said that he felt Martin's hit was so far outside the bounds of the game that the only option was an ejection. His move set a precedent; any violent act that is not considered part of the game is grounds for ejection. The call was largely credited by the media and NFL executives in helping Markbreit land the assignment as the referee of Super Bowl XXI two months later.

Markbreit refereed Super Bowl XVII. During the coin toss Markbreit became confused by the similar design of both sides of the coin: one side had two helmets and the other side showed two players holding helmets. Thus, he incorrectly thought "heads" had landed and had to have a brief conference with head linesman Dale Hamer before correcting his call to "tails".

At Super Bowl XXVI, the Buffalo Bills' Brad Daluiso launched the opening kickoff before Markbreit blew his whistle and signaled the kick could be made. The kickoff was replayed without incident.

Markbreit remained involved in the league, as he served as an instant replay official for two years following his retirement as an active official, and later worked as an associate supervisor and head trainer for NFL referees.

His work outside of football has included advertising sales for Where Magazine, and many years as a trade and barter manager for 3M.

== Books by Markbreit ==
- The Armchair Referee—500 Questions and Answers about Football (ISBN 0-385-08089-1)
- Born to Referee: My Life on the Gridiron (ISBN 0-688-07938-5)
- Last Call: Memoirs of an NFL Referee (ISBN 1-58382-030-2)

== Quotes ==
- "There's no such thing as perfection. Mistakes happen. Officials are so hard on themselves. When they make a mistake, nobody feels worse than they do."
- "I had several big-time mistakes. I felt at the time that it happened, 'Why am I here?' You're heartsick about a call that you made. You want everything to be perfect. But it's not a perfect science. There's nothing perfect."
- "I'm probably the only Jewish man who knows the Catholic mass by heart, both in English and Latin.” Markbreit stated in his memoir he attended Catholic mass prior to every game out of respect to veteran back judge Tom Kelleher, who was on the same crew with Markbreit from 1976 to 1986.

== See also ==
- List of Jews in sports (non-players)
