= Larry Cipa =

American football player (born 1951)

No. 13
- Position: Quarterback

Personal information
- Born: October 5, 1951 (age 75); Detroit, Michigan, U.S.
- Listed height: 6 ft 3 in (1.91 m)
- Listed weight: 209 lb (95 kg)

Career information
- High school: Archbishop McNicholas (Cincinnati, Ohio)
- College: Michigan
- NFL draft: 1974: 15th round, 373rd overall pick

Career history
- New Orleans Saints (1974–1975)

Career NFL statistics
- Passing attempts: 92
- Passing completions: 34
- Completion percentage: 37.0%
- TD–INT: 1–3
- Passing yards: 424
- Passer rating: 42.1
- Stats at Pro Football Reference

Larry Cipa (born October 5, 1951) is an American former professional football player who was a quarterback for the New Orleans Saints of the National Football League (NFL) from 1974 to 1975. He played college football for the Michigan Wolverines from 1971 to 1973.

== Early life ==
Born in Detroit, Michigan, Cipa attended Archbishop McNicholas High School in Cincinnati, Ohio, before enrolling at the University of Michigan.

== College career ==
Cipa played at the quarterback position for the Michigan Wolverines team from 1971 to 1973. He was a backup to Dennis Franklin in 1972 and 1973, starting only one game at quarterback. During his time at Michigan, Cipa appeared in 19 games and completed 24 of 71 passes for 360 yards, five interceptions, and three touchdowns.

== Professional career ==
Cipa was selected by the New Orleans Saints in the 15th round (373rd overall pick) of the 1974 NFL draft. He played for the Saints from 1974 to 1975, appearing in 8 games, three of them as the team's starting quarterback. He appeared in his first game as a starter in December 1974 after injuries to Archie Manning and Bobby Scott. The Saints won the game against the playoffs-bound St. Louis Cardinals, 14–0.

In July 1976, he was traded to the Tampa Bay Buccaneers. Less than a week later, the Buccaneers placed him on waivers after he failed a physical due to arthritis of the knee.
