= Neil Graff =

American football player (born 1950)

No. 15, 16
- Position: Quarterback

Personal information
- Born: January 12, 1950 (age 76); Sioux Falls, South Dakota, U.S.
- Listed height: 6 ft 3 in (1.91 m)
- Listed weight: 205 lb (93 kg)

Career information
- High school: Lincoln (Sioux Falls)
- College: Wisconsin
- NFL draft: 1972: 16th round, 414th overall pick

Career history
- Minnesota Vikings (1972)*; New England Patriots (1974–1975); Seattle Seahawks (1976); Pittsburgh Steelers (1976–1977); Green Bay Packers (1978)
- * Offseason or practice squad member only

Career NFL statistics
- Passing attempts: 48
- Passing completions: 25
- Completion percentage: 52.1%
- TD–INT: 2–3
- Passing yards: 288
- Passer rating: 58.3
- Stats at Pro Football Reference

Neil Graff (born January 12, 1950) is an American former professional football player who was a quarterback in the National Football League (NFL). He played college football for the Wisconsin Badgers and was selected by the Minnesota Vikings in the sixteenth round of the 1972 NFL draft.

He later played two seasons for the New England Patriots, making his first appearance in 1974 during a Patriots blowout win. Backup quarterback Dick Shiner came in and led an 80-yard touchdown drive when the game was already out of hand and Graff came in thereafter to finish the game. In 1975 the Patriots struggled as they had for most of the early seventies finishing 3–11. Graff made his only two NFL starts for the Patriots throwing two touchdowns and three interceptions.

Later he was selected in the 1976 NFL expansion draft by the Seattle Seahawks and split that season as a member of the Seahawks and the Pittsburgh Steelers, though he did not see any playing time in a regular season game with Seattle. He played the following year with the Steelers appearing in four games and being dressed for their playoff appearance against eventual AFC champion Denver. In 1978 he played for the Green Bay Packers but did not make an appearance during the regular season.

Graff is one of two NFL quarterbacks born in the state of South Dakota, the other being Norm Van Brocklin. Graff is an inductee in the South Dakota Sports Hall of Fame.
