= George Hasenohrl =

American football player (1951–2002)

No. 72
- Position: Defensive tackle

Personal information
- Born: March 10, 1951; Cleveland, Ohio, U.S.
- Died: October 31, 2002 (aged 51); Maple Heights, Ohio, U.S.
- Listed height: 6 ft 1 in (1.85 m)
- Listed weight: 260 lb (118 kg)

Career information
- High school: Garfield Heights (OH)
- College: Ohio State
- NFL draft: 1973: 8th round, 198th overall pick

Career history
- New York Giants (1974)

Awards and highlights
- National champion (1970); Second-team All-American (1972); 2× First-team All-Big Ten (1971, 1972); Second-team All-Big Ten (1970)
- Stats at Pro Football Reference

George Hasenohrl (March 10, 1951 – October 31, 2002) was an American professional football defensive tackle. He played for the New York Giants in 1974.

He died on October 31, 2002, in Maple Heights, Ohio at age 51.
