= Tom Slade =

American football player (1952–2006)

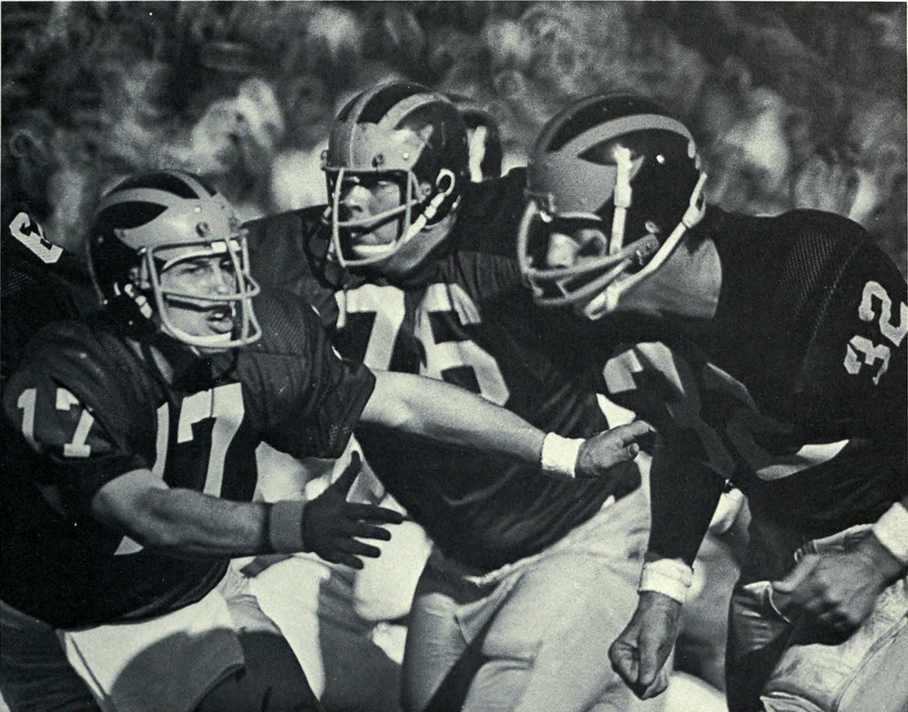
Slade (No. 17) with Jim Brandstatter (No. 76) and Fritz Seyferth (No. 32), 1971

Thomas A. Slade (April 6, 1952 – November 12, 2006) was an American football quarterback who played for the University of Michigan Wolverines football team from 1971 to 1973.

== Saginaw High School ==
Slade was born in Manotick, Michigan, but was raised in Saginaw, Michigan after being adopted. He played football, basketball and tennis for Saginaw High School and earned All-State honors in football as the quarterback at Saginaw High. Slade was married to former University of Michigan cheerleader, Pam St. John. He had two children, Andrew and Spencer from a previous marriage.

== Quarterback at University of Michigan ==
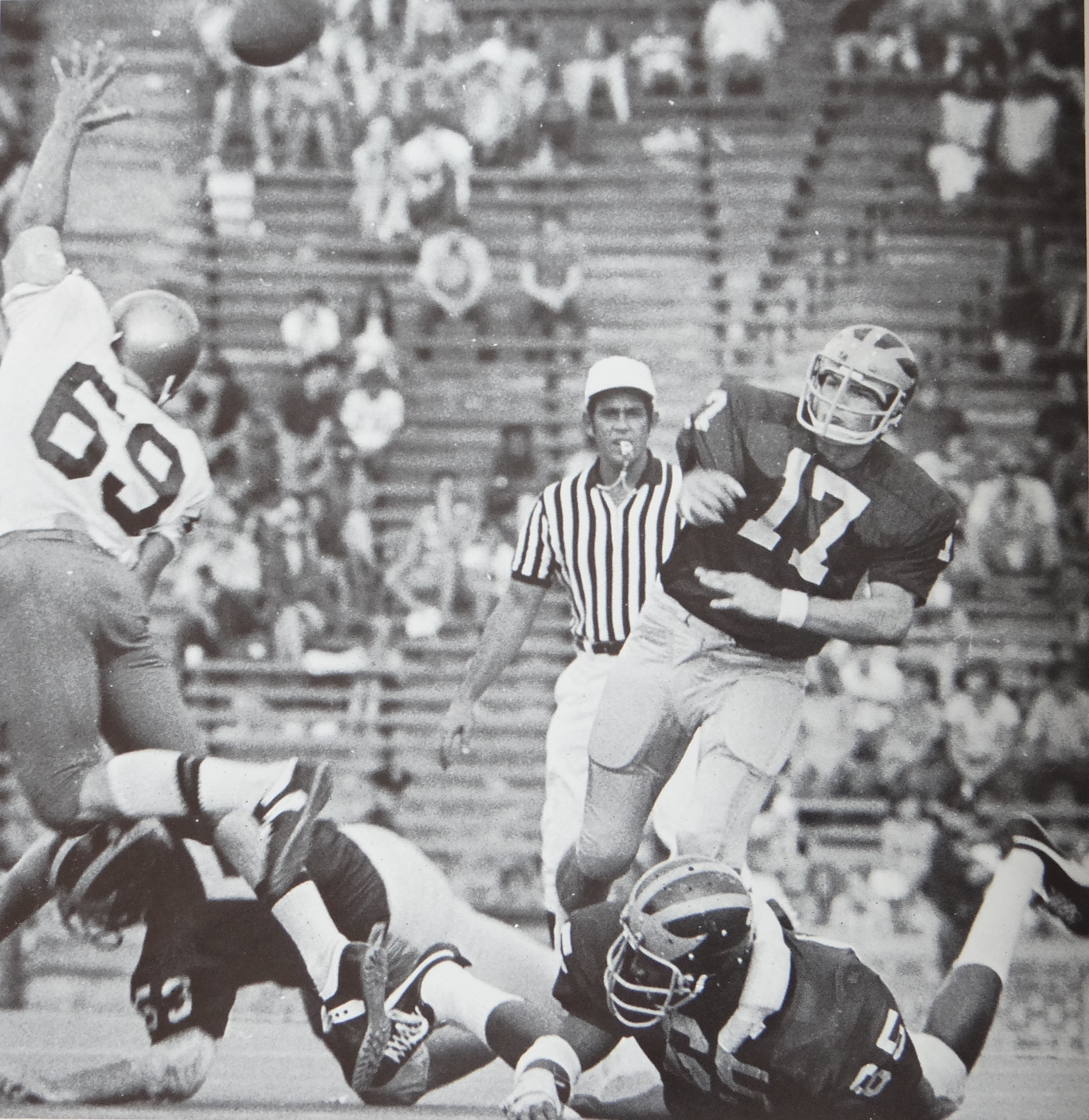
Slade in 1971

After graduating from Saginaw High in 1970, Slade attended the University of Michigan where he played quarterback under coach Bo Schembechler. As a sophomore in 1971, Slade helped lead the 1971 team to an undefeated 11–0 record in the regular season. The Wolverines narrowly missed a national championship that year, losing the 1972 Rose Bowl game, 13–12, on a late field goal by Stanford. More than for his passing, Slade was known for being a tough run-blocker who cleared the way for Billy Taylor and the other Wolverine running backs after he handed the ball off. Dennis Franklin took over as quarterback in 1972, and Slade spent his junior and senior years as a backup for Franklin.

== Professional career ==
After graduating from U-M, Slade returned to attend the U-M School of Dentistry and received a Doctor of Dental Surgery degree in 1978. He taught at the U-M School of Dentistry for three years before starting his own practice in 1981 in nearby Ypsilanti Township, Michigan. Bo Schembechler was one of his dental clients. Slade was also the dentist for the Eastern Michigan University athletic teams.

Slade also worked as a color analyst for Michigan football broadcasts on WUOM-FM.

In his spare time, Slade was a Michigan High School Athletic Association basketball official and officiated numerous state finals. He also served as a Big Ten and Mid-American Conference women's basketball official. He was active in the Ypsilanti Area Chamber of Commerce and served a three-year term as the president of the EMU Baseball "Dugout Club."

In 2004, he was inducted into the Saginaw County Sports Hall of Fame.

== Battle with leukemia ==
In 2005, Slade was diagnosed with leukemia. In June 2006, former U-M teammates, including Calvin O'Neal, organized the Tom Slade Marrow Donor Registration Drive to help find marrow donors for Slade and others with leukemia. At the time, Slade noted that he was unable to do the things he loved, like playing golf, running, and enjoying the outdoors. He offered this advice: "You do everything, live every day the fullest. Today could be the last day of your life." Terry Camp, "Mid-Michigan football legend needs help," WJRT-TV.

Slade remained close to his former coach, Bo Schembechler. The coach sent weekly notes and frequently called and visited after Slade was diagnosed with leukemia. "During a particularly difficult day in the hospital, Slade woke up to see his former coach sitting in a chair against the wall. They looked at each other but said nothing, and Slade fell back to sleep. When he awoke again five hours later, Bo was sitting in the same chair, looking right at him." Slade died on November 12, 2006, in Ann Arbor at age 54.

Though Schembechler was ailing himself, he attended Slade's funeral. That night, Bo delivered his traditional Thursday night pep talk before the Ohio State game. According to the Detroit News: "Bo's speech was not about Ohio State, the Big Ten title or a national championship. The whole speech was about Tom Slade and how, if the players worked hard, listened to their coaches and stuck together as teammates, one day they might be as good a Michigan man as Slade. That was the goal at Michigan, not national championships." The next morning, Schembechler collapsed and died of heart failure before taping his weekly television show.
