= Tom Campana =

American football player (born 1950)

Profile
- Position: Slotback

Personal information
- Born: January 18, 1950 (age 76); Kent, Ohio, U.S.
- Listed height: 5 ft 11 in (1.80 m)
- Listed weight: 185 lb (84 kg)

Career information
- College: Ohio State
- NFL draft: 1972: 13th round, 316th overall pick

Career history
- 1972–1977: Saskatchewan Roughriders

Awards and highlights
- CFL West All-Star (1972); National champion (1970); Second-team All-Big Ten (1971)

Tom Campana (born January 18, 1950) is a former award-winning and all-star slotback who played in the Canadian Football League (CFL) from 1972 to 1977 with the Saskatchewan Roughriders.

A native of Kent, Ohio, Campana played football at Kent's Theodore Roosevelt High School where his father Tom Campana, Sr. was head coach, graduating in 1968. While at Roosevelt, he played with future NFL players Mike Adamle, Tom DeLeone, and Stan White. From Roosevelt, he went to The Ohio State University, along with DeLeone and White, where he played for the Buckeyes and was part of their 1970 national championship team. Joining the Green Riders in 1972, he was a CFL Western All-Star and runner-up for rookie of the year (to Chuck Ealey for the CFL's Most Outstanding Rookie Award). He also played in the 64th Grey Cup when the Green Riders lost in the last minute. He finished his career in 1977 having caught 269 passes for 4040 yards, rushed for 554 yards, and scored 30 touchdowns.
