= Dana Coin =

American football player and coach (born 1949)

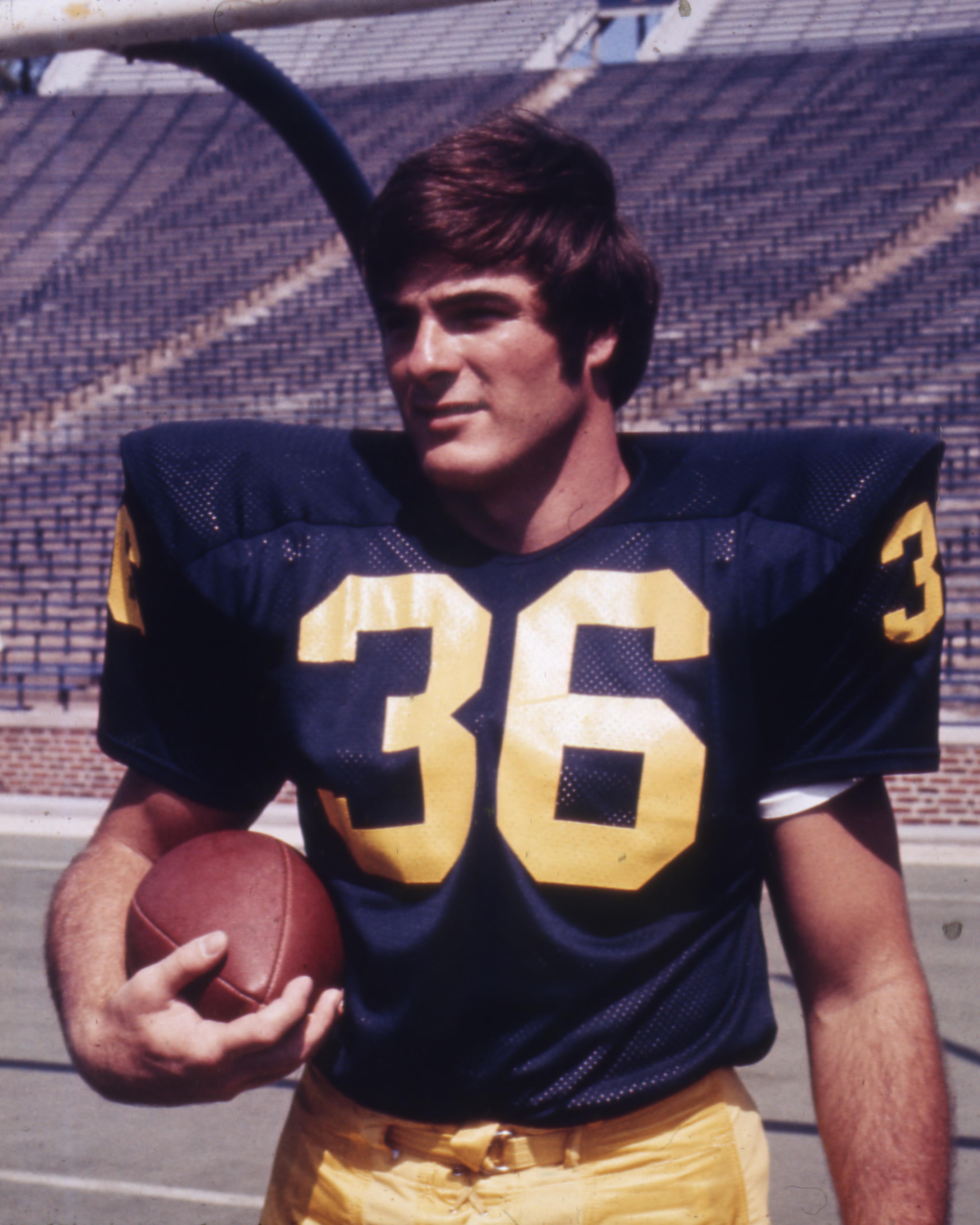
- Coin c. 1971

No. 36
- Positions: Linebacker, placekicker

Personal information
- Born: December 10, 1949 (age 76)
- Listed height: 6 ft 1 in (1.85 m)
- Listed weight: 229 lb (104 kg)

Career information
- High school: Pontiac Northern (MI)
- College: University of Michigan (1969–1971)

Awards and highlights
- Set NCAA record 55 consecutive extra points; 1972 Rose Bowl

Dana S. Coin (born December 10, 1949) is an American former football player and coach. He played as a linebacker and placekicker for the Michigan Wolverines football team from 1969 to 1971. He set a National Collegiate Athletic Association (NCAA) record in 1971 by successfully converting 55 of 55 extra point attempts. He also extended the Michigan school record for the longest field goal in 1970 and kicked a game-winning field goal in November 1971 that clinched a Big Ten Conference championship for the Wolverines. He later served as the defensive coordinator at Eastern Michigan University.

== University of Michigan ==
Coin enrolled at the University of Michigan in 1968 and played for the school's all-freshman team that fall. He was a member of the Michigan Wolverines football team from 1969 to 1971. Coin played for Michigan at a time when the school's head coach, Bo Schembechler, held the view that there would be no kicking specialists on his team and that a kicker had to be a football player first. Accordingly, and although his greatest talent lay in his kicking, he also played at the linebacker position.

As a freshman in 1968, Coin played on Michigan's freshman football team. As a sophomore in 1969, he was a backup linebacker and handled kickoffs for the Wolverines. As a junior in 1970, he began the season handling kickoffs and field goal attempts and took over responsibility for extra points in the middle of the season. On September 19, 1970, he kicked a 42-yard field goal that was, at the time, the longest field goal in Michigan football history. Coin's 42-yard field goal broke a school record of 40 yards set in 1961 by Doug Bickle, and not surpassed until a 50-yard kick by Mike Lantry in 1973.

As a senior in 1971, Coin set an NCAA record by successfully converting 55 of 55 extra points without a miss. He was also the team's leading scorer with 79 points. He kicked a career-high nine extra points against Iowa on November 6, 1971, surpassing the prior season record of 50 extra points set by Al Limahelu of San Diego State. Coin's 55 extra points in 1971 remains a Michigan single-season record.

Coin also started two games at outside linebacker in 1971. Over the course of his career at Michigan, Coin totaled 54 tackles and a fumble recovery. He also successfully converted 70 of 72 extra points and 13 of 27 field goal attempts. On November 13, 1971, Coin preserved Michigan's undefeated record and clinched a Big Ten Conference championship for the school when he kicked two field goals against Purdue, including the game-winning field goal with 46 seconds left in the game. His final game in a Michigan uniform was the 1972 Rose Bowl. Coin kicked a 30-yard field goal and an extra point in the Rose Bowl, but Michigan lost to Stanford, 13–12.

== Later life ==
In August 1972, Coin was hired as an assistant football coach at a high school in Dowagiac, Michigan. He played for the Flint Sabres of the Midwest Football League in 1973. He also became a graduate assistant for the Michigan Wolverines football team later that year. In 1974, he became the defensive coordinator of the Eastern Michigan University Hurons football team and held that position for two-and-a-half years.

After retiring from football, Coin worked as a manufacturer's representative. He later went into the automotive electronics business. He has been married three times and has four children and two stepchildren. As of 2004, he was living in Clarkston, Michigan.
