= Howie Long =

American football player, actor, and sports analyst (born 1960)

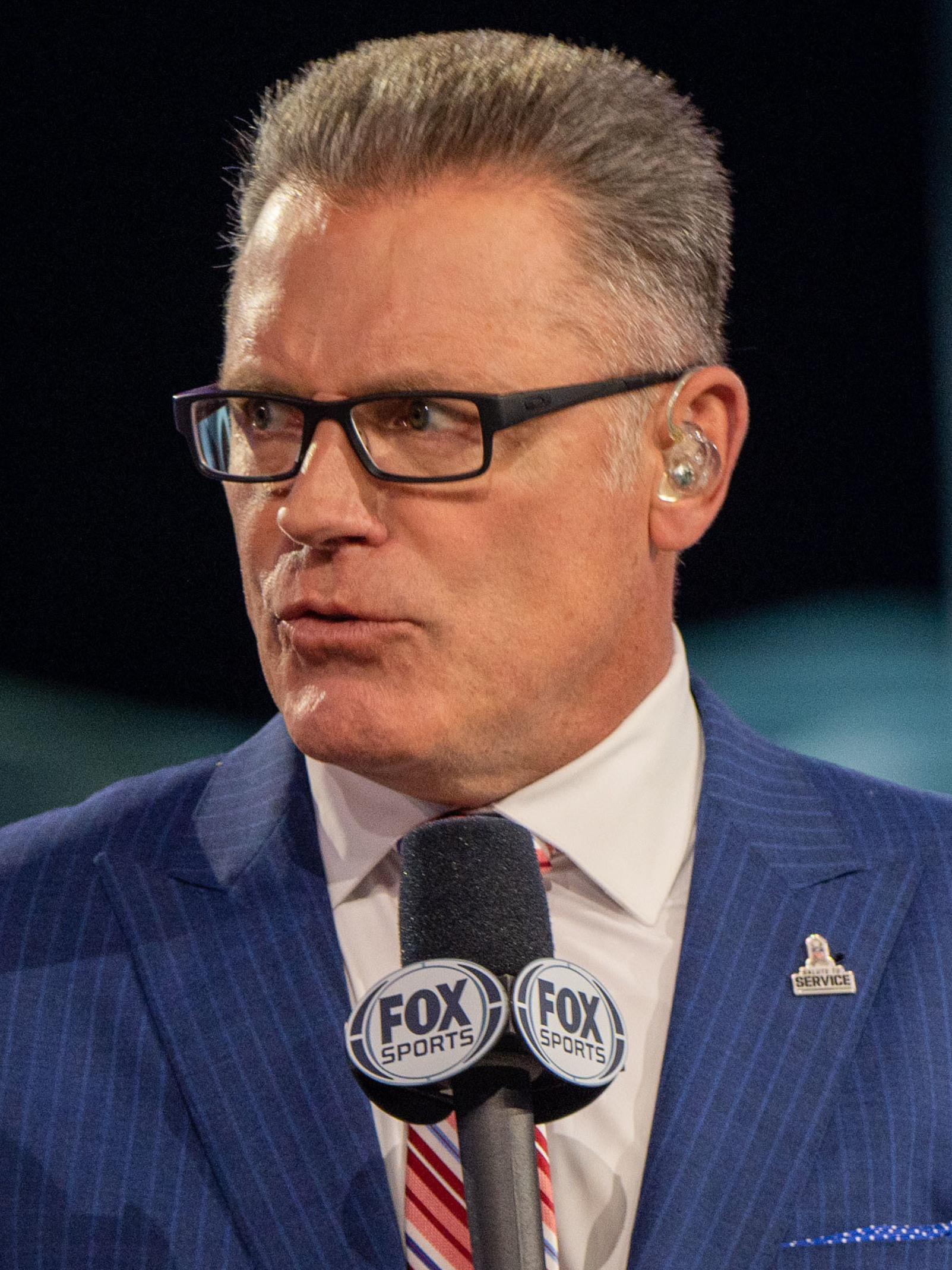
- Long in 2022

No. 75
- Position: Defensive end

Personal information
- Born: January 6, 1960 (age 66); Somerville, Massachusetts, U.S.
- Listed height: 6 ft 5 in (1.96 m)
- Listed weight: 268 lb (122 kg)

Career information
- High school: Milford (Milford, Massachusetts)
- College: Villanova (1977–1980)
- NFL draft: 1981: 2nd round, 48th overall pick

Career history
- Oakland / Los Angeles Raiders (1981–1993)

Awards and highlights
- Super Bowl champion (XVIII); NEA NFL co-Defensive Player of the Year (1985); 3× First-team All-Pro (1983–1985); 2× Second-team All-Pro (1986, 1989); 8× Pro Bowl (1983–1987, 1989, 1992, 1993); NFL 1980s All-Decade Team; First-team All-East (1980)

Career NFL statistics
- Sacks: 93
- Fumble recoveries: 10
- Interceptions: 2
- Interception yards: 84
- Stats at Pro Football Reference
- Pro Football Hall of Fame

Howard Matthew Moses Long (born January 6, 1960) is an American former professional football defensive end who played in the National Football League (NFL) for 13 seasons with the Raiders franchise. He played college football for the Villanova Wildcats and was selected by the Raiders in the second round of the 1981 NFL draft, spending his first season with the team in Oakland and the remainder of his career in Los Angeles. Long received eight Pro Bowl and three first-team All-Pro selections while helping the team win Super Bowl XVIII. He was inducted into the Pro Football Hall of Fame in 2000.

After retiring, Long pursued a career in acting and broadcasting and serves as a studio analyst for Fox Sports' NFL coverage.

== Early life ==
Born in Somerville, Massachusetts, Long was raised in Charlestown, Boston, primarily by his uncles and maternal grandmother. He attended Milford High School in Milford, Worcester County, Massachusetts.

== College career ==
Long played college football for the Villanova Wildcats near Philadelphia and earned a degree in communications. A four-year letterman for the Wildcats, he was selected to play in the Blue–Gray Football Classic and was named the MVP in 1980. As a freshman, Long started every game and had 99 tackles. As a sophomore in 1978, Long led Villanova in sacks with five and recorded 78 tackles. The next season, Long sustained a thigh injury, missed three games, and ended the season with 46 tackles. As a senior in 1980, Long again led the Wildcats with four sacks and had 84 tackles. He began as a tight end but was moved to the defensive line, playing mostly nose guard his first two seasons. After moving to defensive end, he earned All-East honors and was honorable mention All-American in his senior year. Long also boxed at Villanova and was the Northern Collegiate Heavyweight Boxing Champion.

== Professional career ==
Selected in the second round of the 1981 NFL draft by the Oakland Raiders, Long played 13 seasons for the club, wearing the number 75. On the Raiders defensive line, Long earned eight Pro Bowl selections.

He had high aspirations early in his career. He told Football Digest in 1986 that he wanted "Financial security, and I want to be President. That's my goal, and I'd like to win a few more Super Bowls." Along the way, he was also named first-team All-Pro three times (in 1983, '84, and '85) and second-team All-Pro twice (in 1986 and 1989). He was selected by John Madden to the All-Madden teams in 1984 and 1985 and was named to the 10th Anniversary All-Madden team in 1994.

Long was voted the NFL Alumni Defensive Lineman of the Year and the NFLPA AFC Defensive Lineman of the Year in 1985. He capped off a stellar 1985 season earning the George Halas Trophy for having been voted the NEA's co-NFL Defensive Player of the Year (along with Andre Tippett). He was also named the Seagrams' Seven Crown NFL Defensive Player of the year. The following year, Long was voted the Miller Lite NFL Defensive Lineman of the Year. Both those awards were taken by polls of NFL players. In 1986, Long was voted to his fourth consecutive Pro Bowl and was key in helping the Raiders record 63 sacks and being the number one defense in the AFC. From 1983 to 1986 the Raiders defense recorded 249 sacks, which tied with the Chicago Bears for tops in the NFL over that span.

Long collected 91 1/2 sacks during his career (7 1/2 are not official, as sacks were not an official statistic during his rookie year). His career high was in 1983 with 13 sacks, including a career-high five against the Washington Redskins on October 2, 1983. He also intercepted two passes and recovered 10 fumbles during his 13-year career. At the time of his retirement, he was the last player still with the team who had been a Raider before the franchise moved to Los Angeles. He won the Super Bowl XVIII title as the left defensive end with the Raiders (1983 season), beating the Washington Redskins, as he outplayed the opposing offensive tackle, George Starke; the vaunted Washington running game led by John Riggins had only 90 yards in 32 rush attempts.

Long's signature defensive move was the "rip," which employed a quick, uppercut-like motion designed to break an opposing blocker's grip.

Pro Football Weekly (PFW) named Long as one of the ends on its All-time 3–4 defensive front, along with Lee Roy Selmon, Curley Culp, Lawrence Taylor, Andre Tippett, Randy Gradishar, and Harry Carson. PFW based its "Ultimate 3–4" team on the vote of over 40 former NFL players, coaches, and scouts.

== After football ==
=== Broadcasting ===
In March 1986, Long told Inside Sports:

"When I'm finished playing, I'd like to stay in touch with football, through broadcasting. I'm qualified to give a certain perspective and I'm articulate enough to handle it."

After his retirement from the NFL following the 1993 season, in 1994 Long began as a studio analyst for the Fox Network's NFL coverage, where he often plays the "straight man" to the comic antics of co-host Terry Bradshaw.

For a time in the early 2000s, he hosted an annual award show on Fox, Howie Long's Tough Guys, which honored the NFL players whom he deemed the toughest, awarding "the toughest" a Chevrolet truck. He also wrote a column for Foxsports.com.

Long won a Sports Emmy Award in 1996 as "Outstanding Sports Personality/Analyst".

=== Acting ===
Long also pursued an acting career after his retirement, focused mainly on action films — including Firestorm, a 1998 feature in which he starred. He also appeared as a co-star in Broken Arrow, alongside star John Travolta. He played a minor role in the movie 3000 Miles to Graceland alongside Kevin Costner, Kurt Russell and Courteney Cox. In That Thing You Do! (1996), Long appears as Mr. White's (Tom Hanks) "partner" Lloyd in the extended cut of the movie, released on DVD in 2007. Long's part was entirely cut from the theatrical release.

In the movie Broken Arrow, Long became associated with a popular stock sound effect; during his character's death scene, the sound effect is used, which became known as the Howie scream.

Long has also made numerous cameo appearances on TV shows and commercials. Long was a spokesman for Radio Shack, making commercials with actress Teri Hatcher. He has been featured in many other national commercials and advertising campaigns, including those of Coors Light, Nike, Campbell's Chunky Soup, Hanes, Frito Lay, Coca-Cola, Pepsi, Pizza Hut, Taco Bell, Nabisco, Kraft, the Bud Bowl campaign, Honda, and currently for Chevrolet.

==== Filmography ====
- In 'N Out (1984) – Groom
- Broken Arrow (1996) – Kelly
- Firestorm (1998) – Jesse
- Dollar for the Dead (1998) – Reager
- 3000 Miles to Graceland (2001) – Jack

== Personal life ==
Long met his future wife Diane Addonizio during his freshman year at Villanova; they married in 1982, and they have three sons. The eldest, Chris, is a retired defensive end, who played for the St. Louis Rams, New England Patriots, and Philadelphia Eagles, winning two Super Bowls in his own right. The middle son, Kyle, is a guard who played for the Chicago Bears, and played one season for the Kansas City Chiefs after signing with them in March 2021. His youngest, Howie Jr., worked in player personnel for the Raiders.

Long is a Roman Catholic. He is an alumnus of, and volunteers his time for, the Boys and Girls Clubs of America.

Long is the author (with John Czarnecki) of Football for Dummies (2003), a book to help average fans understand the basics of professional football; it is part of the For Dummies series by Wiley Publishing.

== Awards and honors ==
NFL

- Super Bowl XVIII champion
- Three-time First-Team All-Pro
- Eight-time Pro Bowl selection
- NFL 1980s All-Decade Team

Sports Emmy Awards

- 1996 - Studio Analyst

Halls of Fame

- Pro Football Hall of Fame (2000)

In addition, Long was named the 2000 Walter Camp Man of the Year by the Walter Camp Foundation.
