= Andre Tippett =

American football player (born 1959)

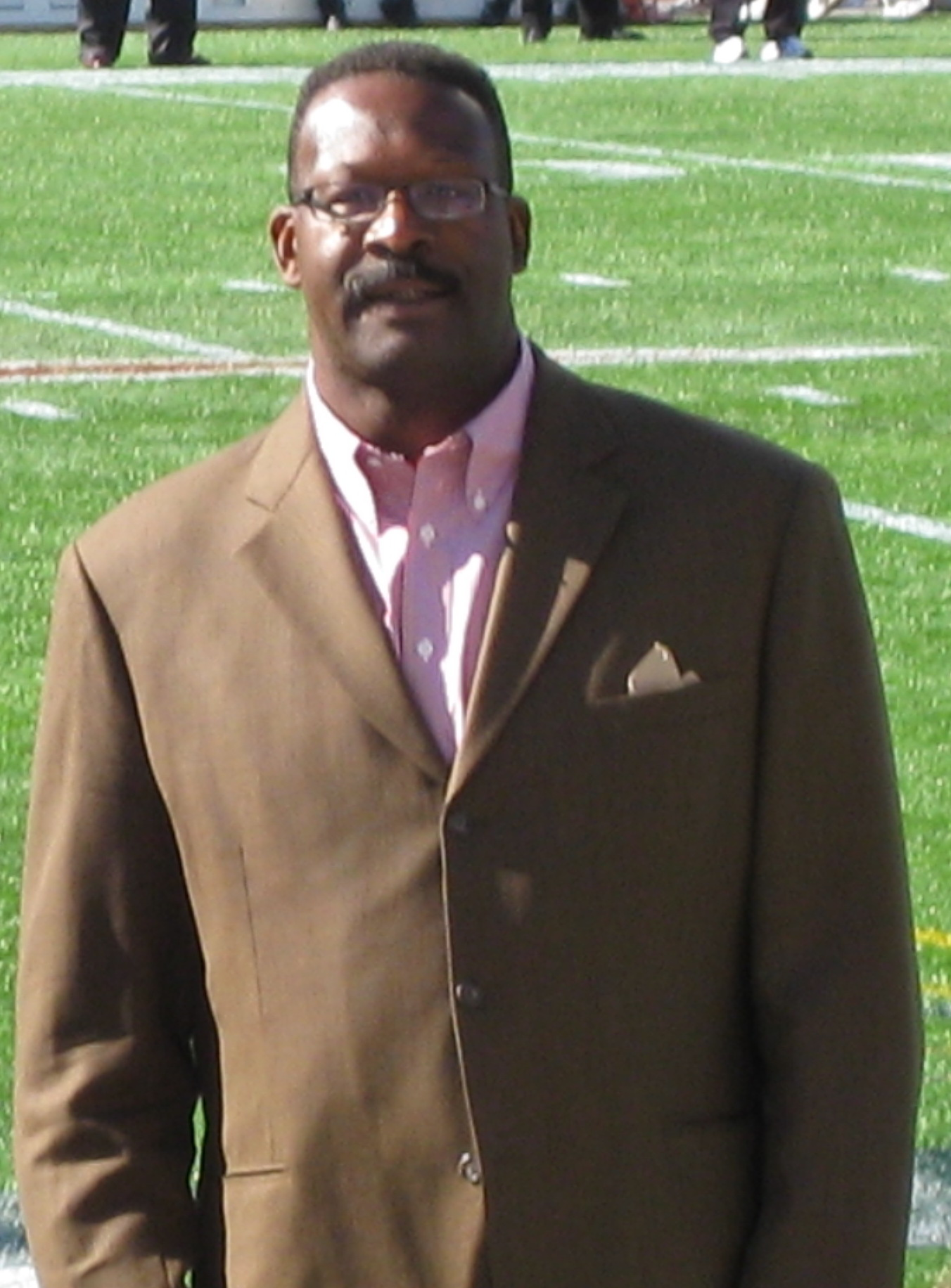
- Tippett in 2008

No. 56
- Position: Linebacker

Personal information
- Born: December 27, 1959 (age 66); Birmingham, Alabama, U.S.
- Listed height: 6 ft 3 in (1.91 m)
- Listed weight: 240 lb (109 kg)

Career information
- High school: Barringer (Newark, New Jersey)
- College: Iowa
- NFL draft: 1982: 2nd round, 41st overall pick

Career history
- New England Patriots (1982–1993)

Awards and highlights
- NFL co-Defensive Player of the Year (NEA) (1985); 2× First-team All-Pro (1985, 1987); 2× Second-team All-Pro (1986, 1988); 5× Pro Bowl (1984–1988); NFL 1980s All-Decade Team; New England Patriots All-1980s Team; New England Patriots All-1990s Team; New England Patriots 35th Anniversary Team; New England Patriots 50th Anniversary Team; New England Patriots Hall of Fame; Consensus All-American (1981); First-team All-Big Ten (1981); Second-team All-Big Ten (1980)

Career NFL statistics
- Games: 151
- Sacks: 100
- Fumble recoveries: 19
- Interceptions: 1
- Defensive touchdowns: 2
- Stats at Pro Football Reference
- Pro Football Hall of Fame
- College Football Hall of Fame

Andre Bernard Tippett Sr. (born December 27, 1959) is an American former professional football player who was a linebacker in the National Football League (NFL) for 11 seasons with the New England Patriots. He played college football for the Iowa Hawkeyes, where he was recognized as a consensus All-American in 1981. A second-round pick in the 1982 NFL draft, Tippett was selected to five Pro Bowls and was named first-team All-Pro twice in his career. Since 2007, he has been the Patriots' executive director of community affairs. He was enshrined in the Pro Football Hall of Fame in 2008.

== Early life ==
Tippett was born in Birmingham, Alabama. He attended Barringer High School in Newark, New Jersey. He first attended college and played football at Ellsworth Community College in Iowa Falls in 1978.

== College career ==
Tippett was an All-American defensive end and a three-year letterman at the University of Iowa. He was also a two-time All-Big Ten selection (1980 and 1981). In 1981, he helped lead the Hawkeyes to their first winning season, their first Big Ten title, and first Rose Bowl in two decades. He was part of a defense that allowed only 129 points, the lowest total since 1965 and 9th-best in school history and allowed only 86.9 rushing yards a game, which still stands as the school record. The 1981 Iowa defense allowed 253 total yards a game, the fewest since 1959, making it the 4th-best defense in school history in terms of total yards. Against Northwestern on October 3, 1981, the Hawkeye defense allowed 78 total yards which stands as 6th-best in defensive performances in team history.

Tippett was a two-time first-team all-Big Ten, and a team captain in 1981. He holds the Iowa record for tackles for lost yardage in a season (20 tackles for 153 yards in 1980). He played in the Hula Bowl and the Japan Bowl in 1982, after his senior year at Iowa. He was voted a DE on Iowa's all-time football team in 1989 as is a member of the University of Iowa's Varsity Hall of Fame. Upon induction to the Varsity Hall of Fame, Tippett remarked, "For me, this is a 'Wow' . . . It is really, really special to be voted by your peers and the people who saw you play. I'm going in with some of the greatest people to ever play sports at the University of Iowa. This is one of the greatest honors I have ever had. This is a special feeling because during the three years I was there, I developed a great bond with the players and coaches."

== Professional career ==
L. T.'s in a class all by himself. I'll put L. T. first, then Tippett, and Bennett behind him.

— Jets fullback Roger Vick, ranking the NFL's best pass rushers during the 1988 season.

Tippett was selected by the New England Patriots in the 2nd round of the 1982 NFL draft with the 41st overall pick.

Tippett is a member of the NFL's 1980s all-decade team and was selected to five Pro Bowls in his career, earning the nod in five straight seasons from 1984 to 1988.

From 1984 to 1985, Tippett recorded the highest two-season sack total by a linebacker in NFL history, totaling 35.0 sacks during the two seasons. His 18.5 sacks in 1984 are the third most by any linebacker in a single season, while his 16.5 sacks in 1985 are tied for the sixth most by any linebacker in NFL history.

Tippett holds the Patriots' franchise record with 100.0 career sacks. He also owns the top three single-season sack performances in Patriots history (18.5 in 1984, 16.5 in 1985 and 12.5 in 1987). He ranked seventh on the all-time sacks list, and third among linebackers, at the time of his retirement following the 1993 season. Over his career, Tippett recorded 100 sacks in 151 games, an average of 0.662 sacks per game. The mark currently ranks fourth in NFL history among linebackers.

After not recording a sack as a rookie in 1982, Tippett finished either first or second on the team in sacks in each of his final 10 seasons. He led the team in sacks six times and finished second on the team four times. Tippett recorded 30 multiple-sack games in his career and sacked a total of 41 different quarterbacks. Tippett recovered 18 opponents' fumbles during his career, tying him for first on the Patriots' all-time list (Steve Nelson). He also forced 17 fumbles in his career.

Tippett was named the AFC's Linebacker of the Year by the NFL Players Association for three straight seasons from 1985 to 1987. He was voted to the Associated Press All-NFL First-team on two occasions (1985 and 1987) and Second-team on two other occasions (1986 and 1988). He was also named to the NFL Films All-Pro team in 1984.

He was voted the Newspaper Enterprise Association (NEA) co-Defensive Player of the Year (with Raider Howie Long) in 1985. Additionally, he was voted the 1985 UPI AFL-AFC Defensive Player of the Year.

Tippett twice earned AFC Defensive Player of the Week awards. The first in the Patriots 20–13 win over the New York Jets as he stopped the Jets 3 times within the 10 yard line on 10–20–85. Next, he was the AFC Defensive Player of the Week in the Patriots 21–7 win over the Houston Oilers on October 18, 1987. In this victory over Houston at the Astrodome, Andre had 3 sacks, defended on a pass play and blocked a field goal attempt that was returned for a touchdown by Raymond Clayborn. He had 1.5 sacks in his final game on January 2, 1994, against the Miami Dolphins.

Tippett spent his entire 11-year career with the Patriots and was a member of three playoff teams, including the 1985 AFC Champions.

== Honors ==
Tippett was selected to the Patriots' 35th Anniversary Team in 1994 and was selected to the Patriots Team of the Century in 2000. He was inducted into the New England Patriots Hall of Fame in 1999. Tippett was inducted into the University of Iowa Hall of Fame on September 7, 2007.

In January 2008, he was voted by a panel of former NFL players and coaches to Pro Football Weekly's All-Time 3–4 defensive team along with Harry Carson, Lawrence Taylor, Randy Gradishar, Howie Long, Lee Roy Selmon, and Curley Culp.

He was named as one of 17 finalists for the Pro Football Hall of Fame's Class of 2007 and 2008. As a finalist, he joined other modern-era players and two players selected by the Hall of Fame's Senior Committee in the pool from which the Hall of Fame class was selected.

The Hall of Fame's 40-member Selection Committee met in Miami on February 3, 2007, to select the Class of 2007. Tippett was not selected for enshrinement, but he was among the top 10 finalists. The 44-member Selection Committee met in Arizona, the day prior to Super Bowl XLII, to vote on the Class of 2008. Just prior, Hall of Fame running back Eric Dickerson said, "I think it is about time Andre Tippett is in the Hall of Fame." He was selected to the Pro Football Hall of Fame for the class of 2008.

Tippett was inducted into the National Jewish Sports Hall of Fame in April 2009. In May 2012, he was inducted into the Alabama Sports Hall of Fame.

On November 13, 2021, Andre Tippett was inducted into the College Football Hall of Fame.

== Personal life ==
He is married to Rhonda Tippett (née Kenney) with three daughters, Janea Tippett, Asia Barnes, and Madison, and one son, Coby. A former Baptist, Tippett converted to Judaism. He currently lives in Sharon, Massachusetts, and is a Pop Warner football coach.

Tippett has also studied martial arts for over three decades. He holds a seventh degree blackbelt in Uechi-ryu karate, and is certified under the Okinawa Karate-do Association based in Okinawa, Japan.

He currently serves as the executive director of Community Affairs for the New England Patriots.

His son Coby played football for the University of Rhode Island as a kick returner and defensive back, He was invited to Rookie Mini Camp with the New England Patriots, and recently played for the Arlington Renegades and Houston Roughnecks of the XFL.

== See also ==
- List of select Jewish football players
