= Gatorade shower =

Form of celebration of victory in sports

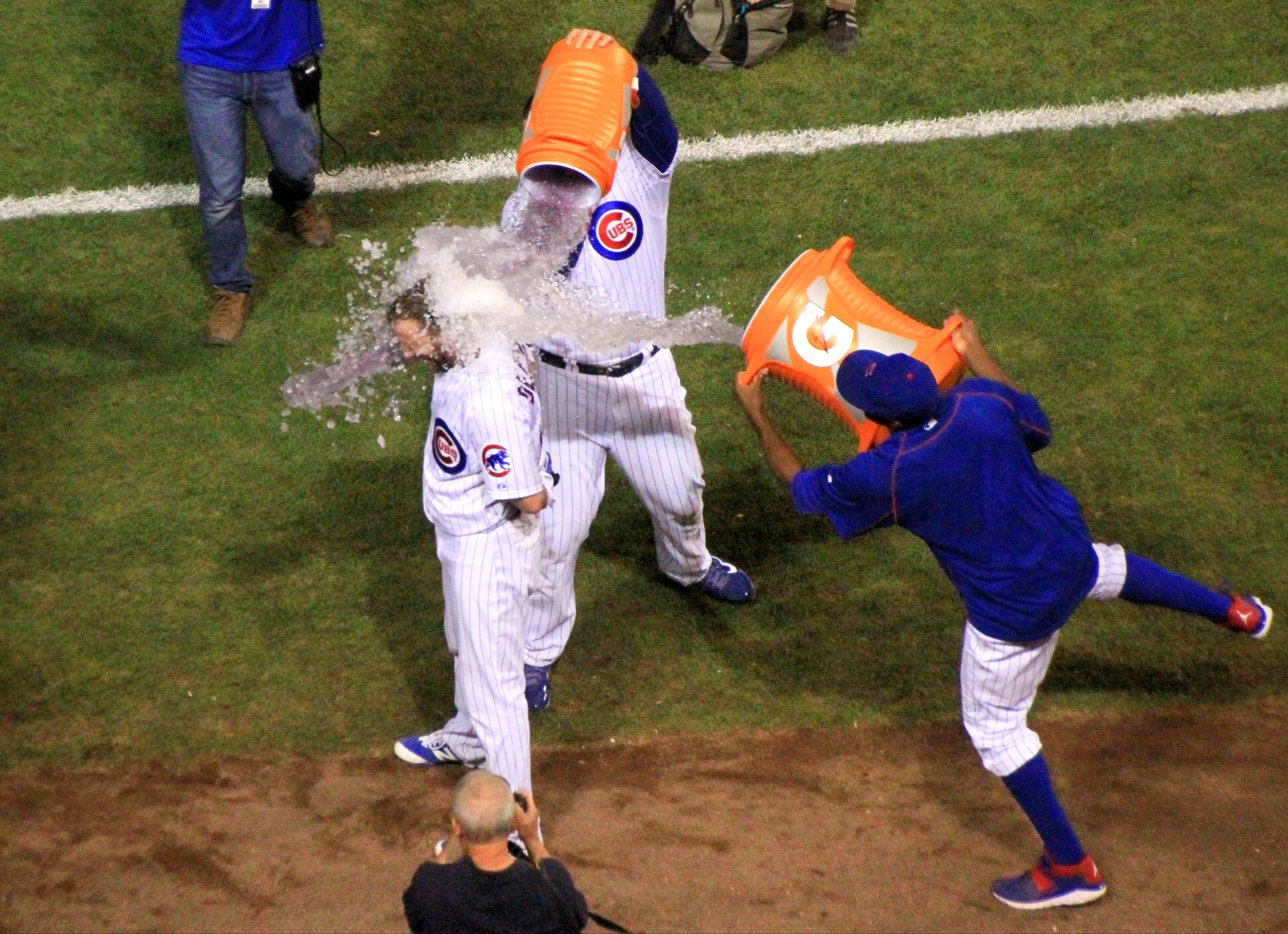
Chris Denorfia of the Chicago Cubs is hit with a double Gatorade shower

The Gatorade shower (also known as the Gatorade dunk or the Gatorade bath) is a sports tradition that involves players surreptitiously dumping a cooler full of liquid (most commonly Gatorade mixed with ice) over the head of their coach (or occasionally a high-profile assistant coach, star player, or team owner in professional leagues) following a meaningful win, such as the Super Bowl, World Series or other major sporting event. This includes all levels of play including Little League World Series, high school, college (NCAA), and professional teams.

== Start of tradition ==
New York Giants nose tackle Jim Burt dumped a cooler of Gatorade on head coach Bill Parcells in revenge after a 37–13 home win over the two-time defending NFC champion Washington Redskins on October 28, 1984. Parcells had been especially hard on Burt in practice prior to that game, making Burt raise a 20 lb (9 kg) dumbbell repeatedly off the ground in the weight room for 45 minutes to simulate raising his arm powerfully out of his stance at the snap of the ball.

Burt and linebacker Harry Carson continued giving Parcells Gatorade showers throughout the 1984 and 1985 seasons. During their 1986 Super Bowl–winning season, Carson got into the habit of celebrating every win with a Gatorade shower. During the 1986-87 playoffs, CBS broadcaster John Madden would use the telestrator at the end of Giants' wins to highlight the Gatorade bucket. Grateful for the free advertising, Gatorade sent Carson and Parcells $1,000 gift certificates to Brooks Brothers.

== Notable examples ==
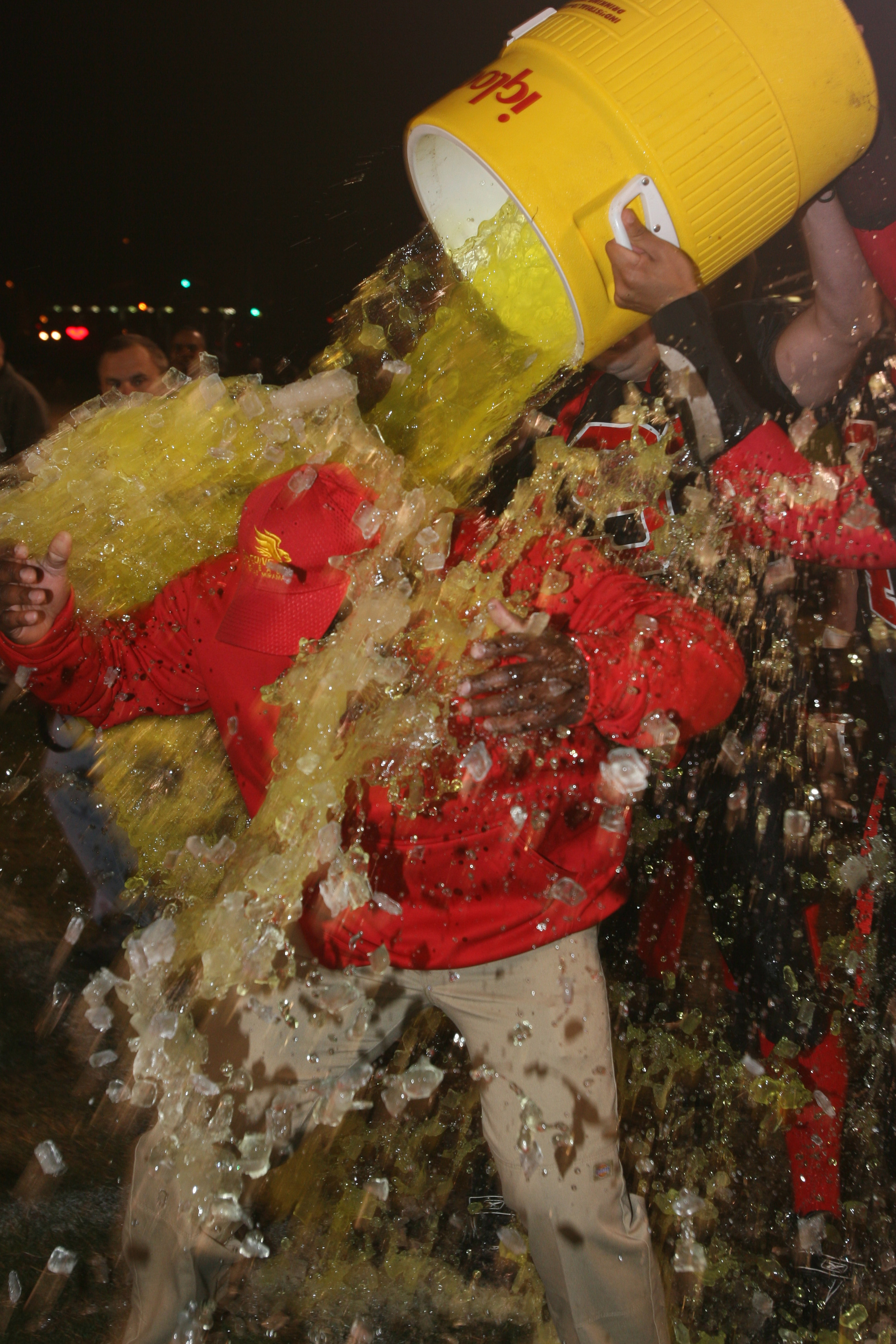
The coach of a Marine Corps league football team is showered with Gatorade following his team's championship victory

Former Chicago Bears defensive tackle Dan Hampton dunked Mike Ditka upon clinching the NFC Central Division championship by beating the Minnesota Vikings 34-3 on November 25, 1984. It had been 14 years since the last time the Bears won the division and there was cause for celebration.

Boston Celtics coach Doc Rivers was reported to be the first NBA coach to receive a Gatorade shower when his team won the 2008 NBA Finals. Paul Pierce dumped a cooler of red Gatorade over Rivers as the Celtics closed out Game 6 to clinch their first NBA title in 22 years. Then-Los Angeles Lakers coach Phil Jackson is the only NBA head coach to receive a Gatorade shower twice, as the Lakers won back-to-back NBA Finals in 2009 (at Amway Arena in Orlando, Florida) and 2010. Dallas Mavericks coach Rick Carlisle likewise received the honors when Mavericks celebrated their first NBA championship in 2011. Miami Heat head coach Erik Spoelstra received the same treatment from Udonis Haslem when the Heat won the 2012 NBA Finals at the American Airlines Arena in 2012.

George Allen, coach of the Long Beach State football team and a former Hall of Fame NFL head coach, died of Ventricular fibrillation six weeks after his team doused him with what was later determined to be ice water after their win over the University of Nevada on November 17th, 1990.

Kentucky Wildcats coach Guy Morriss is one of few coaches ever to receive a Gatorade shower and lose a game. This occurred on November 9, 2002, during the Bluegrass Miracle, when LSU defeated Kentucky. Coach Morriss was showered immediately before Marcus Randall threw a Hail Mary pass to Devery Henderson to win on the final play of the game. On November 24, 2018, LSU coach Ed Orgeron received a Gatorade shower after an apparent LSU game ending interception that was subsequently reviewed and overturned. Texas A&M eventually beat LSU 74–72 in 7 overtimes.

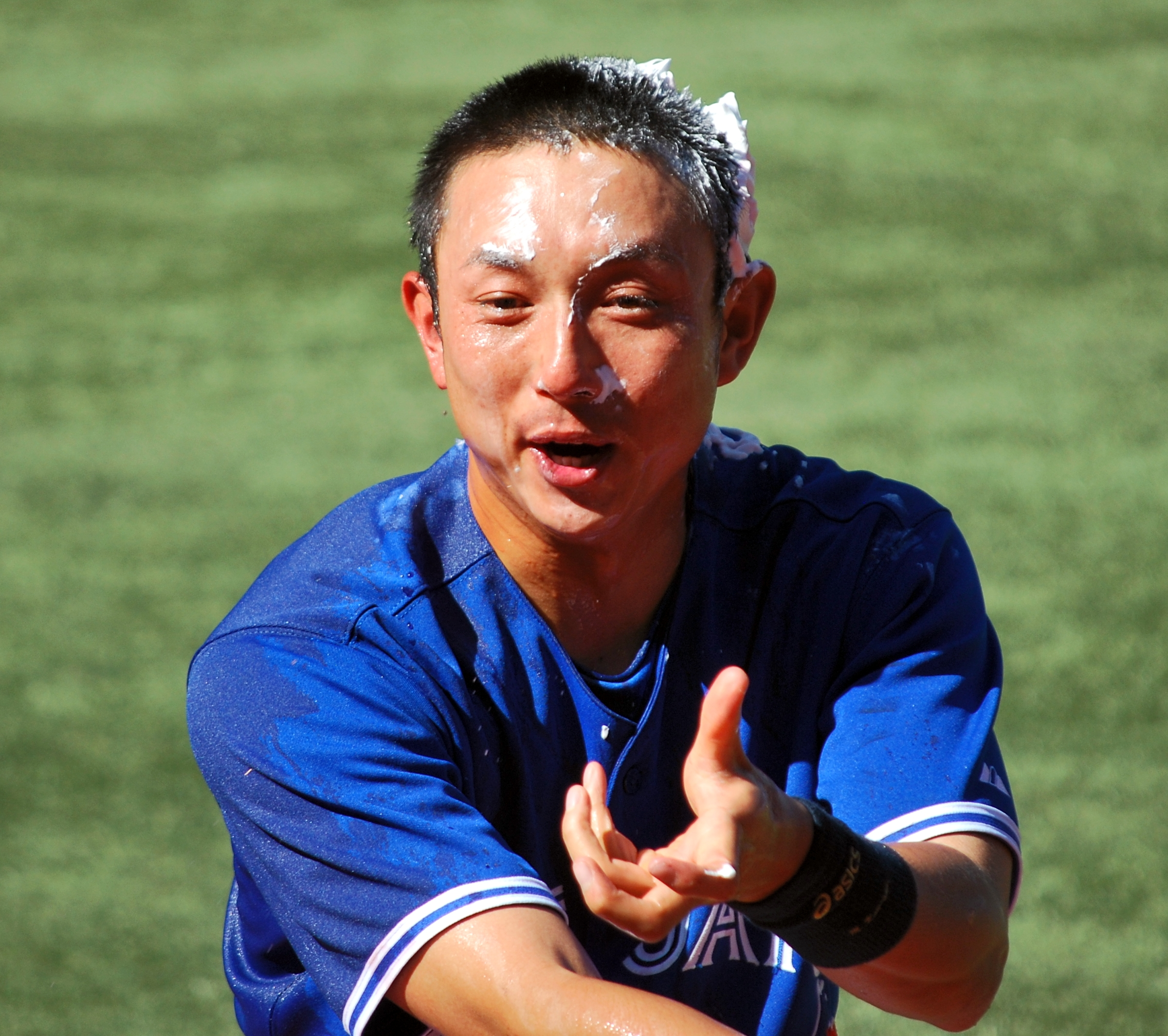
Munenori Kawasaki reacts to being hit with celebratory shaving cream.

Many baseball players give a teammate who has just hit a game-winning home run, or a pitcher who has thrown a no-hitter, a Gatorade shower while they are giving a post-game interview on the field. Salvador Pérez of the Kansas City Royals is known for giving a Gatorade shower to teammates after every home win and notable away wins, which fans have dubbed a "Salvy Splash". By contrast, Adrián Beltré of the Texas Rangers disliked Gatorade showers. After a game in which he hit a grand slam that provided the decisive runs in a 5–2 win over the Athletics on August 15, 2016, he took a broom from the groundskeepers closet and began combing an area of infield dirt. Fellow Rangers teammate Rougned Odor went over to Beltré carrying a bucket filled with Gatorade but missed when he tried to dump the bucket on Beltré. Other times, baseball players receive a pie or shaving cream to the face in lieu of a Gatorade shower.

The Australian NRL rugby league club Melbourne Storm's players have given their coach, Craig Bellamy, a Gatorade shower every time they have won the premiership under him, including in 2007, 2009 and 2012. In the AFL, players are customarily given a shower if they win in their first game with their club.

In cricket, the Australian cricket team players gave their coach Darren Lehmann a Gatorade shower on two occasions, during post celebrations after his team won the 2013-14 Ashes series and during a post match interview after the 2015 Cricket World Cup Final.

In 2016, the coach of Brazilian team SE Palmeiras received a Gatorade Shower during his first interview after receiving the 2016 Brasileirão title. This also was the first time known that someone received a Gatorade shower in first division of Brazilian soccer. The team did this again after their 2018 title.

Vladimir Guerrero Jr., a baseball player on the Toronto Blue Jays, is known for giving his teammates Gatorade showers after meaningful victories at home, often whenever they occur in game-ending fashion. He would sneak up from behind them and then drench them as they were being interviewed on-field by a reporter (usually Hazel Mae of Sportsnet). Mae was often caught in the line of fire of the Gatorade showers, to which she jokingly acknowledged, "I need a new job", after Guerrero dumped Gatorade on her and his teammate Bo Bichette following the Blue Jays' victory on May 21, 2022, against the Cincinnati Reds at Rogers Centre. In August 2022, the Blue Jays held a "Victory Vlad" bobblehead promotion whereby fans in attendance at the game versus the Cleveland Guardians would receive a bobblehead depicting Guerrero in victory mode. The Blue Jays advertised this promotion by having Mae in her signature dress and wedge shoes comedically dumping Gatorade on the bobblehead, in retaliation for all of the times Guerrero has dumped Gatorade on her following Blue Jays victories.

== Variations ==
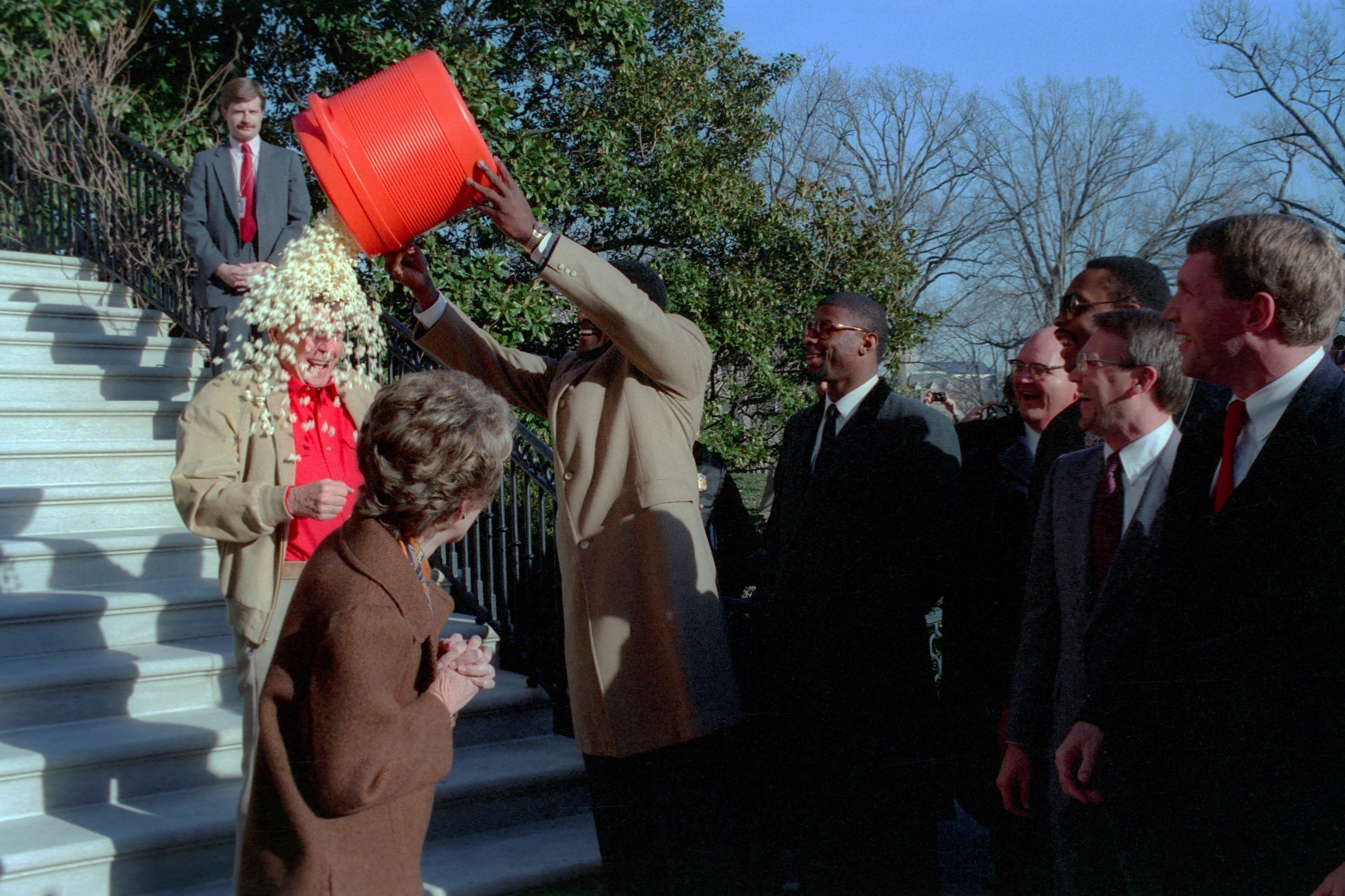
Harry Carson dumping popcorn on Ronald Reagan in 1987.

An early variation of the Gatorade shower was adopted by Harry Carson, who had helped popularize the tradition, when he dumped a bucket of popcorn on President Ronald Reagan when the New York Giants visited the White House after winning Super Bowl XXI in 1987.

Many teams do not use Gatorade but instead use water or another substitute; for example, the Florida State Seminoles use Powerade, due to their sponsorship agreement with Powerade manufacturer The Coca-Cola Company and Gatorade's affiliation with rival University of Florida.

After Michigan State University's win over Penn State in 2010, Spartan players dumped a Gatorade bucket filled with green and white confetti on head coach Mark Dantonio. This was done because of the cold temperature and Dantonio's heart condition. Likewise, following a win over Texas A&M in the 2016 Texas Bowl, Kansas State players poured confetti on 77-year-old head coach Bill Snyder.

The tradition has become a mainstay of the Super Bowl, so much so that numerous gambling websites have established various "prop bets" on situations during the game, most commonly involving what color the liquid will be.

As the tradition has evolved, not all showers are reserved for championship games. Gatorade showers have occurred after key victories that were not championship games, after the defeat of a rival, after the snapping of a losing streak, or after the snapping of an opponent's winning streak.

Generally, it happens during an interview. Sometimes, the "victim" is the journalist. Another variation is shaving cream on the face, with a towel. After an NFC Wild Card playoff game on January 10, 2021, New Orleans Saints head coach Sean Payton was drenched with green slime — a trademark of children's cable network Nickelodeon — as a tie-in to the network's youth-oriented simulcast of the game.

A number of college football bowl games have variations on the Gatorade shower, often related to the bowl's name or its title sponsor:

- Following their 2019 Sun Bowl victory, the Arizona State Sun Devils poured a Gatorade jug full of Frosted Flakes cereal (in reference to the game's title sponsorship by Kellogg's, done via Frosted Flakes mascot Tony the Tiger) on coach Herm Edwards.
- The winner of the Famous Idaho Potato Bowl is showered with french-fried potatoes instead of Gatorade.
- On December 29, 2020, Oklahoma State head coach Mike Gundy was doused with Cheez-Its following a win in the 2020 Cheez-It Bowl.
- The winner of the Duke's Mayo Bowl receives a mayonnaise bath.

In 2022, Duke's Mayo auditioned people for the privilege of performing the bath.

- The winner of the Pop-Tarts Bowl receives a Pop-Tarts bath.

== Tradition documented ==
In 2005, ESPN sports business writer Darren Rovell published a book entitled First in Thirst: How Gatorade Turned the Science of Sweat into a Cultural Phenomenon, in which he documented, among other things, the story behind the Gatorade dunking sensation.

== Elsewhere in popular culture ==
The Kroll Show episode "Soaked in Success" features a recurring sketch in which characters across all walks of life are soaked with Gatorade upon "winning", in increasingly inappropriate or ironic scenarios.

== See also ==
- Ice Bucket Challenge
- Pieing
