= ACC 50th Anniversary men's football team =

Collegiate football team (2002-03)

During the 2002–03 school year, the Atlantic Coast Conference (ACC) celebrated its 50th anniversary by selecting the top players in its respective sports. Fifty players were selected for the men's football team, which was voted on by a 120-member committee that was chosen by the conference's 50th Anniversary Committee.

Clemson led all schools with nine members selected, while Florida State and North Carolina were tied for second with eight honorees. NC State had six players selected, followed by Virginia (5), Maryland (4), Duke (3), Georgia Tech (3), Wake Forest (3), and South Carolina with one.

== Team members ==
In alphabetical order:

- Bill Armstrong, Wake Forest (1973–1976)
- Tiki Barber, Virginia (1993–1996)
- Dré Bly, North Carolina (1996–1998)
- Joe Bostic, Clemson (1975–1978)
- Peter Boulware, Florida State (1994–1996)
- Derrick Brooks, Florida State (1991–1994)
- Ted Brown, NC State (1975–1978)
- Kelvin Bryant, North Carolina (1979–1982)
- Jerry Butler, Clemson (1975–1978)
- Dennis Byrd, NC State (1965–1967)
- Dick Christy, NC State (1955–1957)
- Marco Coleman, Georgia Tech (1989–1991)
- Bennie Cunningham, Clemson (1973–1975)
- Jeff Davis, Clemson (1978–1981)
- Jim Dombrowski, Virginia (1982–1985)
- Warrick Dunn, Florida State (1993–1996)
- Boomer Esiason, Maryland (1981–1983)
- Steve Fuller, Clemson (1975–1978)
- William Fuller, North Carolina (1980–1983)
- Roman Gabriel, NC State (1960–1961)
- Joe Hamilton, Georgia Tech (1996–1999)
- Alex Hawkins, South Carolina (1956–1958)
- Clarkston Hines, Duke (1986–1989)
- Torry Holt, NC State (1995–1998)
- Sebastian Janikowski, Florida State (1997–1999)
- Marvin Jones, Florida State (1990–1992)
- Stan Jones, Maryland (1951–1953)
- Terry Kinard, Clemson (1978–1982)
- Amos Lawrence, North Carolina (1977–1980)
- Bob Matheson, Duke (1964–1966)
- Don McCauley, North Carolina (1968–1970)
- Mike McGee, Duke (1957–1959)
- Herman Moore, Virginia (1988–1990)
- Bob Pellegrini, Maryland (1953–1955)
- Julius Peppers, North Carolina (1999–2001)
- Michael Dean Perry, Clemson (1984–1987)
- William Perry, Clemson (1981–1984)
- Brian Piccolo, Wake Forest (1962–1964)
- Frank Quayle, Virginia (1966–1968)
- Jim Ritcher, NC State (1976–1979)
- Anthony Simmons, Clemson (1995–1997)
- Chris Slade, Virginia (1988–1992)
- Norm Snead, Wake Forest (1958–1960)
- Ken Swilling, Georgia Tech (1988–1991)
- Lawrence Taylor, North Carolina (1978–1980)
- Mike Voight, North Carolina (1973–1976)
- Charlie Ward, Florida State (1990–1993)
- Peter Warrick, Florida State (1996–1999)
- Chris Weinke, Florida State (1997–2000)
- Randy White, Maryland (1972–1974)

== See also ==
- ACC 50th Anniversary men's basketball team
