= Coby Tippett =

American football coach

Profile
- Position: Cornerback

Personal information
- Born: Sharon, Massachusetts, U.S
- Listed height: 5 ft 8 in (1.73 m)
- Listed weight: 195 lb (88 kg)

Career information
- High school: Cheshire Academy
- College: Towson (2017–2019); Rhode Island (2020–2021)
- NFL draft: 2022: undrafted

Career history

Playing
- Arlington Renegades (2023); Houston Roughnecks (2023)

Coaching
- Tufts (2023) Cornerbacks coach; New England Patriots (2024) Special teams assistant

Awards and highlights
- First team All-CAA (2021); Second team All-CAA (2020–21); 2x Third team All-CAA (2019, 2021)

Andre Bernard 'Coby' Tippett Jr. is an American football coach and former cornerback who most recently worked as a special teams assistant for the New England Patriots of the National Football League (NFL). The only son of Patriots legend Andre Tippett, Tippett played for both the Towson Tigers and the University of Rhode Island and played for their football team as a kick returner and defensive back.

Tippett also played for both the Arlington Renegades and the Houston Roughnecks of the XFL.

== Playing career ==
Pre-draft measurables
Height	Weight	Arm length	Hand span	40-yard dash	10-yard split	20-yard split	20-yard shuttle	Three-cone drill	Vertical jump	Broad jump	Bench press
5 ft 8 1/4 in (1.73 m)	195 lb (88 kg)	30 7/8 in (0.78 m)	9 1/2 in (0.24 m)	4.64 s	1.54 s	2.52 s	4.21 s	7.21 s	33.5 in (0.85 m)	9 ft 5 in (2.87 m)	11 reps
All values from Pro Day

Tippett went undrafted in the 2022 NFL draft. On May 2, 2022, Tippett was invited by the New England Patriots to their rookie minicamp, but ultimately did not make the team.

=== Arlington Renegades ===
On January 10, 2023, Tippett signed with the Arlington Renegades. On January 23, he was released from the team.

=== Houston Roughnecks ===
After being released by the Renegades, Tippett signed with the Houston Roughnecks, but was quickly released from the team.

== Coaching career ==
On August 16, 2023, Tippett was hired as the cornerbacks coach for Tufts University.

On February 19, 2024, Tippett was hired by the New England Patriots as a special teams assistant.
