= 1986 All-Pro Team =

Official list of the best NFL players in 1986

The 1986 All-Pro Team is composed of the National Football League players that were named to the Associated Press, Newspaper Enterprise Association, Pro Football Writers Association, Pro Football Weekly, and The Sporting News in 1986. Both first and second teams are listed for the AP and NEA teams. These are the five teams that are included in Total Football II: The Official Encyclopedia of the National Football League. In 1986 the AP chose two defensive tackles (one a nose-tackle) rather than two defensive tackles and one nose tackles as they had done since 1981. The Pro Football Writers Association returned to a 4-3 format for their 1986 defense.

== Teams ==
Offense
Position	First team	Second team
Quarterback	Dan Marino, Miami Dolphins (AP, PFWA, PFW, TSN); Phil Simms, New York Giants (NEA)	Tommy Kramer, Minnesota Vikings (AP-2); Dan Marino, Miami Dolphins (NEA-2)
Running back	Joe Morris, New York Giants (AP, NEA, PFWA, PFW, TSN); Eric Dickerson, Los Angeles Rams (AP, NEA, PFWA, PFW, TSN)	Curt Warner, Seattle Seahawks (AP-2, NEA-2); Walter Payton Chicago Bears (AP-2, NEA-2)
Wide receiver	Al Toon, New York Jets (AP, NEA, PFWA, PFW); Jerry Rice, San Francisco 49ers (AP, NEA, PFWA, PFW, TSN); Stanley Morgan, New England Patriots (TSN)	Stanley Morgan, New England Patriots (AP-2); Steve Largent, Seattle Seahawks (NEA-2); Gary Clark, Washington Redskins (AP-2, NEA-2)
Tight end	Mark Bavaro, New York Giants (AP, PFWA, PFW, TSN); Todd Christensen, Los Angeles Raiders (NEA)	Mark Bavaro, New York Giants (NEA-2); Todd Christensen, Los Angeles Raiders (AP-2)
Tackle	Anthony Muñoz, Cincinnati Bengals (AP, NEA, PFWA, PFW, TSN); Jimbo Covert, Chicago Bears (AP, PFWA, PFW, TSN); Brian Holloway, New England Patriots (NEA)	Jackie Slater, Los Angeles Rams (AP-2, NEA-2); Gary Zimmerman, Minnesota Vikings (NEA-2); Brad Benson, New York Giants (AP-2)
Guard	Dennis Harrah, Los Angeles Rams (AP, NEA, PFW, TSN); Bill Fralic, Atlanta Falcons (AP, PFWA, PFW, TSN); Russ Grimm, Washington Redskins (NEA, PFWA)	Russ Grimm, Washington Redskins (AP-2); Dan Fike, Cleveland Browns (NEA-2); Randy Cross, San Francisco 49ers (AP-2, NEA-2)
Center	Dwight Stephenson, Miami Dolphins (AP, NEA, PFWA, PFW, TSN)	Jay Hilgenberg, Chicago Bears (AP-2, NEA-2)

Special teams
Position	First team	Second team
Kicker	Morten Andersen, New Orleans Saints (AP, NEA, PFWA, PFW, TSN)	Tony Franklin, New England Patriots (AP-2); Pat Leahy, New York Jets (NEA-2)
Punter	Sean Landeta, New York Giants (AP, PFW, PFWA, TSN); Rohn Stark, Indianapolis Colts (NEA)	Sean Landeta, New York Giants (NEA-2); Rohn Stark, Indianapolis Colts (AP-2)
Kick Returner	Dennis Gentry, Chicago Bears (PFW); Bobby Joe Edmonds, Seattle Seahawks (AP); Mel Gray, New Orleans Saints (TSN)	Vai Sikahema, St. Louis Cardinals (AP-2)
Punt Returner	Bobby Joe Edmonds, Seattle Seahawks (PFWA, PFW, TSN)	
Special Teams	Mosi Tatupu, New England Patriots (PFW)	

Defense
Position	First team	Second team
Defensive end	Rulon Jones, Denver Broncos (AP, PFWA, PFW, TSN); Dexter Manley, Washington Redskins (AP, NEA, PFWA, PFW, TSN); Dan Hampton, Chicago Bears (NEA)	Leonard Marshall, New York Giants (AP-2); Howie Long, Los Angeles Raiders (NEA-2); Rulon Jones, Denver Broncos (NEA-2); Dan Hampton, Chicago Bears (AP-2)
Defensive tackle	Reggie White, Philadelphia Eagles (AP, NEA, PFWA); Steve McMichael, Chicago Bears (PFWA, PFW, TSN); Bill Pickel, Los Angeles Raiders (AP, TSN); Michael Carter, San Francisco 49ers (NEA); Bill Maas, Kansas City Chiefs (PFW)	Bob Golic, Cleveland Browns (NEA-2); Keith Millard, Minnesota Vikings (NEA-2); Bill Maas, Kansas City Chiefs (AP-2); Steve McMichael, Chicago Bears (AP-2)
Middle linebacker	Karl Mecklenburg, Denver Broncos (AP, NEA, PFWA. PFW, TSN); Mike Singletary, Chicago Bears (AP, NEA, PFWA, PFW, TSN)	John Offerdahl, Miami Dolphins (AP-2); Harry Carson, New York Giants (AP-2, NEA-2); Kyle Clifton, New York Jets (NEA-2)
Outside linebacker	Wilber Marshall, Chicago Bears (AP, PFWA, PFW, TSN); Lawrence Taylor, New York Giants (AP, NEA, PFWA, PFW, TSN); Rickey Jackson, New Orleans Saints (NEA)	Andre Tippett, New England Patriots (AP-2, NEA-2); Wilber Marshall, Chicago Bears (NEA-2); Rickey Jackson, New Orleans Saints (AP-2)
Cornerback	LeRoy Irvin, Los Angeles Rams (AP, PFWA, TSN); Hanford Dixon, Cleveland Browns (AP, NEA, PFWA, PFW, TSN); Darrell Green, Washington Redskins (NEA); Raymond Clayborn, New England Patriots (PFW)	Jerry Gray, Los Angeles Rams (AP-2); LeRoy Irvin, Los Angeles Rams (NEA-2); Darrell Green, Washington Redskins (AP-2); Albert Lewis, Kansas City Chiefs (NEA-2)
Safety	Ronnie Lott, San Francisco 49ers (AP, NEA, PFWA, PFW); Deron Cherry, Kansas City Chiefs (AP, TSN); Dave Duerson, Chicago Bears (PFWA, PFW, TSN); Dennis Smith, Denver Broncos (NEA)	Dave Duerson, Chicago Bears (AP-2); Deron Cherry, Kansas City Chiefs (NEA-2); Leonard Smith, St. Louis Cardinals (AP-2, NEA-2)

== Key ==
- AP = Associated Press first-team All-Pro
- AP-2 = Associated Press second-team All-Pro
- NEA = Newspaper Enterprise Association first-team All-Pro team
- NEA-2 = Newspaper Enterprise Association second-team All-Pro team
- PFW = Pro Football Weekly All-Pro team
- PFWA = Pro Football Writers Association All-NFL
- TSN = The Sporting News All-Pro
