= Brad Van Pelt =

American football player (1951–2009)

No. 10, 91, 50
- Position: Linebacker

Personal information
- Born: April 5, 1951; Owosso, Michigan, U.S.
- Died: February 17, 2009 (aged 57); Harrison, Michigan, U.S.
- Listed height: 6 ft 5 in (1.96 m)
- Listed weight: 235 lb (107 kg)

Career information
- High school: Owosso
- College: Michigan State (1970–1972)
- NFL draft: 1973: 2nd round, 40th overall pick

Career history
- New York Giants (1973–1983); Los Angeles Raiders (1984–1985); Cleveland Browns (1986)

Awards and highlights
- Second-team All-Pro (1978); 5× Pro Bowl (1976–1980); New York Giants Ring of Honor; 28th greatest New York Giant of all-time; Maxwell Award (1972); Unanimous All-American (1972); First-team All-American (1971); 2× First-team All-Big Ten (1971, 1972)

Career NFL statistics
- Sacks: 24.5
- Interceptions: 20
- Interception yards: 135
- Fumble recoveries: 14
- Stats at Pro Football Reference
- College Football Hall of Fame

Brad Alan Van Pelt (April 5, 1951 – February 17, 2009) was an American professional football linebacker who played for 14 seasons in the National Football League (NFL). He played college football for the Michigan State Spartans, where he won the Maxwell Award in 1972. He was selected by the New York Giants, earning five Pro Bowl selections during his eleven years with the team. He rounded out his career with the Los Angeles Raiders from 1984 to 1985 and the Cleveland Browns in 1986.

== Early life ==
Van Pelt attended Owosso High School, which was a member of the Big Nine Conference in Owosso, Michigan. Dean Howe covered high school sports for the Flint Journal and recalled an incident involving Van Pelt:

He was like a man among boys. He was about 6' 5", 220. One night, his coach from Owosso called in and said he got 32 rebounds in a game. I didn't put that in the paper. I didn't believe that. So, the next game I went out when they played Davison and I just counted his rebounds and he got (42). He was just so dominant.

In 1969 he was named all-state as a quarterback and first-team all-league in basketball, baseball and two ways in football. The Detroit Tigers and California Angels tried to sign Van Pelt directly out of high school, but he declined.

== College career ==
He played college football at nearby Michigan State University where he was a two-time All-American at safety, in 1971 and 1972 and also won the Maxwell Award as the nation's best player, the first time a defensive back won the award. He was also named Chevrolet Defensive Player of the Year and Columbus Touchdown Club Defensive Player of the Year. His career coincided with the last three years of the tenure of legendary Spartans coach Duffy Daugherty.

In his college career, Van Pelt had fourteen interceptions returning two of them for touchdowns. He followed his senior season playing in the East-West Shrine Game, the Hula Bowl, and the College All-Star Game. Van Pelt also played basketball and baseball at MSU, earning a total of seven varsity letters.

== Professional career ==
As a member of the Giants, Van Pelt was a member of the Crunch Bunch, a team of fierce linebackers composed of Van Pelt, Brian Kelley, Lawrence Taylor and Harry Carson. The group is widely considered one of the best linebacking combos in NFL history. He was also named the player of the decade for the 1970s by the Giants.

During his 11-year career with the franchise, the Giants posted a winning record only once, in 1981, when New York reached the playoffs for the only time in a 20-year stretch between 1964 and 1983. Van Pelt also has the unusual distinction of playing for the franchise in four different home stadiums: Yankee Stadium, the Yale Bowl, Shea Stadium, and Giants Stadium. He also played for five Giants head coaches: Alex Webster, Bill Arnsparger, John McVay, Ray Perkins, and Bill Parcells.

Van Pelt wore number 10 with the Giants, his college number, even though the NFL instituted a jersey numbering system for the 1973 season, which then limited linebackers entering the league to numbers 50 through 59. He was allowed to wear 10 because he was the backup kicker in his rookie year. (Number 10 is now retired by the Giants for Eli Manning.) Van Pelt wore number 91 with the Raiders and wore number 50 with the Browns. Since 2021, 10 is now permitted for linebackers again in the NFL.

== Post NFL ==
In addition to being teammates, the four Crunch Bunch members were close friends. They knew each other longer as friends than as players and frequently talked on the phone, played golf and attended memorabilia signing events. Van Pelt was quoted in 2004:

I feel as comfortable with (Carson, Kelley and Taylor) as I do with my brothers. Obviously, your brothers are your brothers, but these three are probably the closest thing to them. Brian and I played 11 years together. I played nine with Harry. Lawrence being the guy (he is), it didn't take long for him to fit right in and become one of the guys. I can't really explain why but they're the only three I stay close with.

The Crunch Bunch went to Puebla, Mexico on October 26, 2004, to promote Habitat for Humanity and assist 3,000 volunteers who were building 150 houses. While there, they met and talked with former president Jimmy Carter and his wife, Rosalynn.

Van Pelt went back to school to complete coursework for his degree in 1998 and in 2000, he was elected to the Sports Hall of Fame at Michigan State University. In 2001, Van Pelt was inducted into the College Football Hall of Fame in the class with Steve Young. He was nominated for the Pro Football Hall of Fame in 2005, but was not elected. In 2009, Van Pelt was inducted into the East-West Shrine Game Hall of Fame. He participated in the 48th East-West Shrine Game in 1972. The year before his death, he and his fiancée, Deanna, purchased a home in Harrison, Michigan, where his two brothers and mother reside. They spent most of their time there.

Van Pelt was inducted into the New York Giants Ring of Honor during the 2011 season at halftime in a game between the Giants and the Green Bay Packers.

== Personal life ==
He is the father of former quarterback Bradlee Van Pelt.

== Death ==
On February 17, 2009, Van Pelt was found by his longtime fiancée, slumped in a chair, dead from an apparent heart attack. He was 57 and had no known heart condition; but his father had died at an early age from heart problems.

Van Pelt's death was a shock to the Crunch Bunch. Harry Carson commented, "I am just so glad that I got to know the man more so than the athlete." Brian Kelley stated:

It was total devastation. I've known Brad since '73 – 36 years. I've known him longer than my wife and my kids. Football was 11 years of our life. We had 25 other years when we were together, did things together and still are doing them together, us and LT and Harry Carson. It's sort of like losing a limb because the four of us are so close. To lose one of us is tough. It's even tough to believe it happened. ... I'm just going to miss him, miss seeing him at Giants games, miss him calling me about stupid stuff.

== See also ==
- History of the New York Giants (1979–93)
