= Firestorm (1998 film) =

- Theatrical release poster
- Directed by: Dean Semler
- Written by: Chris Soth
- Produced by: Thomas M. Hammel; Joseph Loeb III; Matthew Weisman
- Starring: Howie Long; Scott Glenn; William Forsythe; Suzy Amis
- Cinematography: Stephen F. Windon
- Edited by: Jack Hofstra
- Music by: J. Peter Robinson
- Distributed by: 20th Century Fox
- Release date: January 9, 1998
- Running time: 89 minutes
- Country: United States
- Language: English
- Budget: $19 million
- Box office: $8,165,212

Firestorm is a 1998 American action thriller film directed by Dean Semler and starring Howie Long, Scott Glenn, William Forsythe, and Suzy Amis.

== Plot ==
During a forest fire in northern Wyoming, smokejumper Jesse Graves and his mentor Wynt Perkins are rescuing trapped civilians when a woman begs them to rescue her daughter from a burning cabin. They locate the girl, but Wynt is injured by a travel trailer sent flying by an explosion. Jesse manages to free Wynt and rescue both him and the girl from a flashover; Wynt's injuries mean that he must retire from active duty, but he balks at the idea of "full" retirement due to his inadequate pension plan.

Months later, a group of convicts stage an escape with the help of an arsonist on the outside, who sets a fire in the forest so that the prisoners will be taken there to help firemen, giving the prisoners a chance to escape. Randall Alexander Shaye, who had stolen US$37 million four years previously and hidden it in the forest, kills his cellmate and takes his identity as he and five other escapees go to retrieve the money. They pose as Canadian firefighters and take Jennifer, a bird watcher, hostage along the way. Unbeknownst to all of them, another forest fire has started due to a lightning strike from a week earlier.

Jesse, realizing that the "firefighters" are convicts in disguise, must find a way to stop Shaye and his group of convicts while saving Jennifer at the same time. Shaye gradually kills off his men in order to collect the money himself, starting with fellow prisoners Wilkins, a mapmaker, and Karge, a former wrestler. However, Shaye finds out that the money was destroyed in the fire. He proceeds to kill Loomis, a former Air Force pilot, by pushing him off a cliff to make it look like an accident, and shoots Packer, a serial rapist, after he gets caught in a spring trap set up by Jesse. Wynt does everything he can to help Jesse and save Jennifer.

Jennifer tells Jesse that she was a Marine before she became a bird watcher. She and Jesse try to give out smoke signals to have Jesse's friends find him before the two separate forest fires combine and will suck up all the oxygen. Wynt arrives to save a busload of prisoners and firefighters after they were forced at gunpoint to get inside the vehicle. He hotwires the bus and drives it away to safety. Wynt then catches up with Jesse and comes up with a plan. Jesse begins to realize his friend knew that there was a fire from the beginning and never told anyone.

Wynt tells Jesse he started the fire in order for a land developer to build a training school for firefighters but knew nothing of the prison break. Jesse tells him it wasn't his fault and promises he will keep the crime a secret from his friends. Wynt confronts Shaye by telling him Shaye's lawyers set him up to take the fall. He shoots Shaye in the leg but is killed in the process. Jesse throws a fire axe into Shaye's chest, causing him to fall off the boat he and Jennifer were in. Jesse and Jennifer use the boat as an air pocket to keep from drowning, and to prevent themselves from getting burned alive as the firestorm destroys the area. Suddenly, gunshots start coming from underneath them and a couple of bullets make a hole in the boat.

Shaye survives his injury and plans on killing Jennifer and Jesse. Jesse gets the upper hand and kills Shaye by shoving his head through the hole under the boat, burning him to death. Heavy rainfall then drowns out the fire and Jesse and Jennifer swim to shore, where they wait to be rescued. Jennifer also realizes that the eggs she had with her have hatched, much to the pleasure of Jesse.

== Cast ==
- Howie Long as Chief Jesse Graves
- Scott Glenn as Wynt Perkins
- William Forsythe as Randall Alexander Shaye
- Suzy Amis as Jennifer, Ornithologist
- Christianne Hirt as Monica
- Garwin Sanford as Pete
- Sebastian Spence as "Cowboy"
- Michael Greyeyes as Andy
- Barry Pepper as Packer
- Vladimir Kulich as Karge
- Tom McBeath as Loomis
- Benjamin Ratner as Wilkins
- Jonathon Young as Sherman
- Chilton Crane as Tina’s Mom
- Robyn Driscoll as Tina’s Dad
- Alexandria Mitchell as Tina
- Terence Kelly as Lawyer
- David Fredericks as Guard
- Gavin Buhr as Childs
- Danny Wattley as Moody
- Derek Hamilton as Dwyer
- Adrien Dorval as Belcher
- Jon Cuthbert as Davis
- Sean Campbell as Deputy
- Deryl Hayes as Sheriff Garrett

Scott Glenn, who played the firefighter turned arsonist in the film, also starred in Backdraft (1991), where, coincidentally, he played the part of a Chicago firefighter who was an arsonist.

== Production ==
The screenplay for the film, written on spec by Chris Soth as his thesis for the MFA Screenwriting program at USC, was originally purchased by the now defunct Savoy Pictures. When Savoy had the project, the film was going to be more epic in scale, with comprehensive visual and computer effects. Savoy even offered Sylvester Stallone $20 million to star, which he accepted. However, the studio went bust before the film was made. 20th Century Fox picked up the script from "turnaround" and fashioned it into a more intimate, smaller budgeted movie as they were looking to only spend $20 million on the picture. Graham Yost did an uncredited production polish on the script, which was also rewritten by four other writers on the way to production.

== Reception ==
The film opened to very negative reviews. On the review aggregator website Rotten Tomatoes, 12% of 26 critics' reviews are positive, with an average rating of 3.7/10. The website's consensus reads: "Firestorm failed to ignite ex-pro footballer Howie Long's career...or anything else for that matter." Audiences polled by CinemaScore gave the film an average grade of "C−" on a scale of A+ to F.

=== Box office ===
The film was a bomb at the box office. It opened in 7th place with a paltry $3.8 million (behind six films that had all been released at least three weeks earlier) and took in only $8.1 million in the United States during its theatrical run.

== See also ==
- List of firefighting films
