= Brian Kelley (American football) =

American football player (born 1951)

No. 55
- Position: Linebacker

Personal information
- Born: September 1, 1951 (age 75); Dallas, Texas, U.S.
- Listed height: 6 ft 3 in (1.91 m)
- Listed weight: 230 lb (104 kg)

Career information
- High school: Sunny Hills (Fullerton, California)
- College: Cal Lutheran (1969–1972)
- NFL draft: 1973: 14th round, 353rd overall pick

Career history
- New York Giants (1973–1983)

Awards and highlights
- 67th greatest New York Giant of all-time; First-team Little All-American (1972)

Career NFL statistics
- Sacks: 1.5
- Interceptions: 15
- Interception yards: 226
- Fumble recoveries: 11
- Stats at Pro Football Reference
- College Football Hall of Fame

Brian Lee Kelley (born September 1, 1951) is an American former professional football player who spent his entire career as a linebacker for the New York Giants of the National Football League (NFL) from 1973 to 1983. He was selected by the Giants in the 14th round of the 1973 NFL draft.

Kelley grew up in Fullerton, California, where he was an outstanding athlete at Sunny Hills High School. He attended California Lutheran University, a National Association of Intercollegiate Athletics (NAIA) member and played college football. Cal Lutheran won the NAIA National Championship in Kelley's junior year, but in his senior year, they lost, even though Kelley was named MVP of the championship game. He was also honored as a little All-American. On May 11, 2010, Kelley was elected into the College Football Hall of Fame.

As a member of the Giants, Kelley was one of the Crunch Bunch, a team of linebackers composed of Kelley, Brad Van Pelt, Lawrence Taylor, and Harry Carson. The group is widely considered one of the best linebacking combos in NFL history.

== College career ==
Kelley had played defensive end and tight end at Sunny Hills High School in Fullerton, California prior to college. For college, Kelley played linebacker for Cal Lutheran Kingsmen in Thousand Oaks, CA, a team he helped to win the NAIA National Championship in his junior year in 1971. He was selected by the Associated Press as a first-team linebacker on the 1972 Little All-America college football team. Kelley, at 6’3” and 225 lbs was selected for the New York Giants after assistant Jim Garrett had seen him play. He was named the team's most valuable player in the NAIA Championship and was selected to the NAIA All-America First-team as well as the NAIA District 3 Defensive First-team and the All-Lutheran College Defensive First-team. He was inducted into the CLU Athletics Hall of Fame in 2003. After CLU, he played for eleven seasons starting as a linebacker for the New York Giants. Besides football, Kelley was also a member of the university's wrestling program and was named the NAIA District III heavyweight wrestling champion in 1970. He became CLU's first College Football Hall of Fame inductee after his induction in 2010. He finished his college career with seventeen interceptions, which was a school record, and as a punter averaging 34.6 yards per punt.
