= ACC 50th Anniversary men's basketball team =

Collegiate basketball team (2002-03)

During the 2002–03 school year, the Atlantic Coast Conference (ACC) celebrated its 50th anniversary by selecting the top players in its respective sports. Fifty players were selected for the men's basketball team, which was voted on by a 120-member committee that was chosen by the conference's 50th Anniversary Committee.

North Carolina (12) and Duke (11) led all schools with the most selections. Maryland had eight players selected, followed by Wake Forest (5), Georgia Tech and NC State (4), Virginia (3), Clemson (2) and South Carolina with one. The 50th Anniversary team includes:

- 17 players who earned National Player of the Year honors a total of 22 times. Ralph Sampson is the only three-time winner in the conference's history.
- 27 players who earned consensus first-team All-America honors a total of 38 times.
- 18 players who were three-time first-team All-ACC selections.
- 48 players were first round selections in either the annual NBA or ABA draft, including 9 players who were the first overall selection in that year's draft.
- 7 players who earned Academic All-American honors.

== Team members ==
In alphabetical order:

- Kenny Anderson, Georgia Tech
- Shane Battier, Duke
- Len Bias, Maryland
- Elton Brand, Duke
- Tom Burleson, NC State
- Len Chappell, Wake Forest
- Randolph Childress, Wake Forest
- Billy Cunningham, North Carolina
- Brad Daugherty, North Carolina
- Charlie Davis, Wake Forest
- Walter Davis, North Carolina
- Johnny Dawkins, Duke
- Juan Dixon, Maryland
- Tim Duncan, Wake Forest
- Len Elmore, Maryland
- Danny Ferry, Duke
- Phil Ford, North Carolina
- Mike Gminski, Duke
- Horace Grant, Clemson
- Matt Harpring, Georgia Tech
- Dickie Hemric, Wake Forest
- Art Heyman, Duke
- Grant Hill, Duke
- Bobby Hurley, Duke
- Antawn Jamison, North Carolina
- Bobby Jones, North Carolina
- Michael Jordan, North Carolina
- Albert King, Maryland
- Christian Laettner, Duke
- Jeff Lamp, Virginia
- John Lucas, Maryland
- Tom McMillen, Maryland
- Larry Miller, North Carolina
- Rodney Monroe, NC State
- Jeff Mullins, Duke
- Barry Parkhill, Virginia
- Sam Perkins, North Carolina
- Mark Price, Georgia Tech
- John Roche, South Carolina
- Wayne Rollins, Clemson
- Lennie Rosenbluth, North Carolina
- Ralph Sampson, Virginia
- Charles Scott, North Carolina
- Dennis Scott, Georgia Tech
- Ron Shavlik, NC State
- Joe Smith, Maryland
- David Thompson, NC State
- Buck Williams, Maryland
- Jason Williams, Duke
- James Worthy, North Carolina

== See also ==
- ACC 50th Anniversary men's football team
