= Harry Carson =

American football player (born 1953)

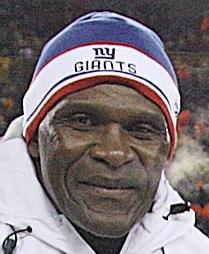
- Carson in 2008

No. 53
- Position: Linebacker

Personal information
- Born: November 26, 1953 (age 72); Florence, South Carolina, U.S.
- Listed height: 6 ft 2 in (1.88 m)
- Listed weight: 237 lb (108 kg)

Career information
- High school: Wilson (Florence)
- College: South Carolina State (1972–1975)
- NFL draft: 1976: 4th round, 105th overall pick

Career history
- New York Giants (1976–1988)

Awards and highlights
- Super Bowl champion (XXI); 6× Second-team All-Pro (1978, 1981, 1982, 1984 - 1986); 9× Pro Bowl (1978, 1979, 1981–1987); PFWA All-Rookie Team (1976); New York Giants Ring of Honor; 7th greatest New York Giant of all-time

Career NFL statistics
- Sacks: 8
- Interceptions: 11
- Fumble recoveries: 14
- Defensive touchdowns: 1
- Games: 173
- Stats at Pro Football Reference
- Pro Football Hall of Fame
- College Football Hall of Fame

Harry Donald Carson (born November 26, 1953) is an American former professional football player who spent his entire career as a linebacker for the New York Giants of the National Football League (NFL). Carson was inducted into the College Football Hall of Fame in 2002, the Pro Football Hall of Fame in 2006 and the New Jersey Hall of Fame in 2018.

== Early life ==
Born in Florence, South Carolina, Carson played at Wilson High School and later at McClenaghan High School, from which he graduated.

== College career ==
Attended and graduated with a Bachelor of Science Degree in Education in 1976 from South Carolina State University.

Before his NFL career, Carson played college football for Willie Jeffries at South Carolina State University from 1972 to 1975, not missing a single game in four years. He became the first Mid-Eastern Athletic Conference player to win consecutive defensive player of the year honors, and assisted the Bulldogs to consecutive conference championships. In 1975, he was a first-team selection on the AFCA College-Division All-America team and set school records with 117 tackles and 17 sacks. With Carson as their captain, the Bulldogs defense recorded six shutouts in 1975, and held their opponents to just 29 points, an NCAA record for a ten-game season. Carson's Bulldog teammates included future Pittsburgh Steelers and College Football Hall of Fame safety Donnie Shell and future Kansas City Royals first baseman Willie Mays Aikens. In 2002, Carson was enshrined in the College Football Hall of Fame, and he was inducted into the Black College Football Hall of Fame in 2012.

== Professional career ==
After his college career, Carson was drafted 105th overall in the fourth round of the 1976 NFL draft by the Giants. He spent all of his 13 seasons with them, leading the team in tackles for five seasons, and more impressively, served as their captain for ten. Carson was a member of the Crunch Bunch, a team of fierce linebackers composed of Carson, Brad Van Pelt, Brian Kelley, and Lawrence Taylor. The group is widely considered one of the best defensive combos in NFL history. He was a member of the Big Blue Wrecking Crew defense and also made nine Pro Bowl appearances (1978–1979, 1981–1987) in his career. In the 1980s he was joined by Lawrence Taylor, another Pro Football Hall of Fame linebacker. In his 13 seasons, Carson intercepted 11 passes and returned them for a total of 212 yards. He also recovered 14 fumbles, returning them for 36 yards and one touchdown. Officially, he recorded eight quarterback sacks (sacks did not become an official NFL statistic until 1982) but his total is 19 sacks when the 1976–81 seasons are included. He retired at the end of the 1988 season, two years after helping the team win Super Bowl XXI, the Giants' first, and Carson had seven tackles for the victors.

Carson was one of the first practitioners of the "Gatorade shower" which is when the coach of the winning team is doused with a cooler of Gatorade by some of the players following a win. The practice was started by his teammate Jim Burt in 1985 as Carson recounted in his 1987 book Point of Attack: The Defense Strikes Back. When Bill Parcells had Carson as a player with the Giants, he would have him at his side during the singing of the national anthem for good luck.

Bill Belichick, an assistant coach for the Giants for 12 years, who as head coach, led the New England Patriots to six 21st century Super Bowl victories, considered Carson the best all-around linebacker he ever coached.

== Professional Football Hall of Fame ==
Carson did the one thing no defensive player ever gets enough credit for, even though it's the first thing every defensive coach talks about with his team every week: he defended the run.

~Peter King, member of the Pro Hall of Fame Board of Selectors, on why it took so long for Carson to be inducted.

Carson was elected to the Pro Football Hall of Fame in 2006. His selection came after years of outspoken criticism of the Hall of Fame selection process. In 2004, Carson asked to have his name taken off the ballot.

Despite previously stating that due to his frustration at not being elected he wanted his name removed from the ballot, when elected to the Hall of Fame in 2006 Carson appeared and gave an induction speech. Carson later commented on the selection, saying he was humbled by the selection but noting:

The Hall of Fame will never validate me. I know my name will be in there, but I take greater pride in the fact that my teammates looked at me as someone they could count on. I still remember, and I will remember this for the rest of my life, the Super Bowl against Denver. We had three captains—me, Phil Simms and George Martin. But when it came time for the coin toss before the game, I started to go out and looked around for those guys. Bill Parcells said to me: 'No. You go. Just you.' And that was about the coolest feeling I've ever had in the world—going out to midfield for the Super Bowl, as the lone captain. There were nine Denver Broncos out there, and me. Just me. An awesome responsibility. The greatest respect.

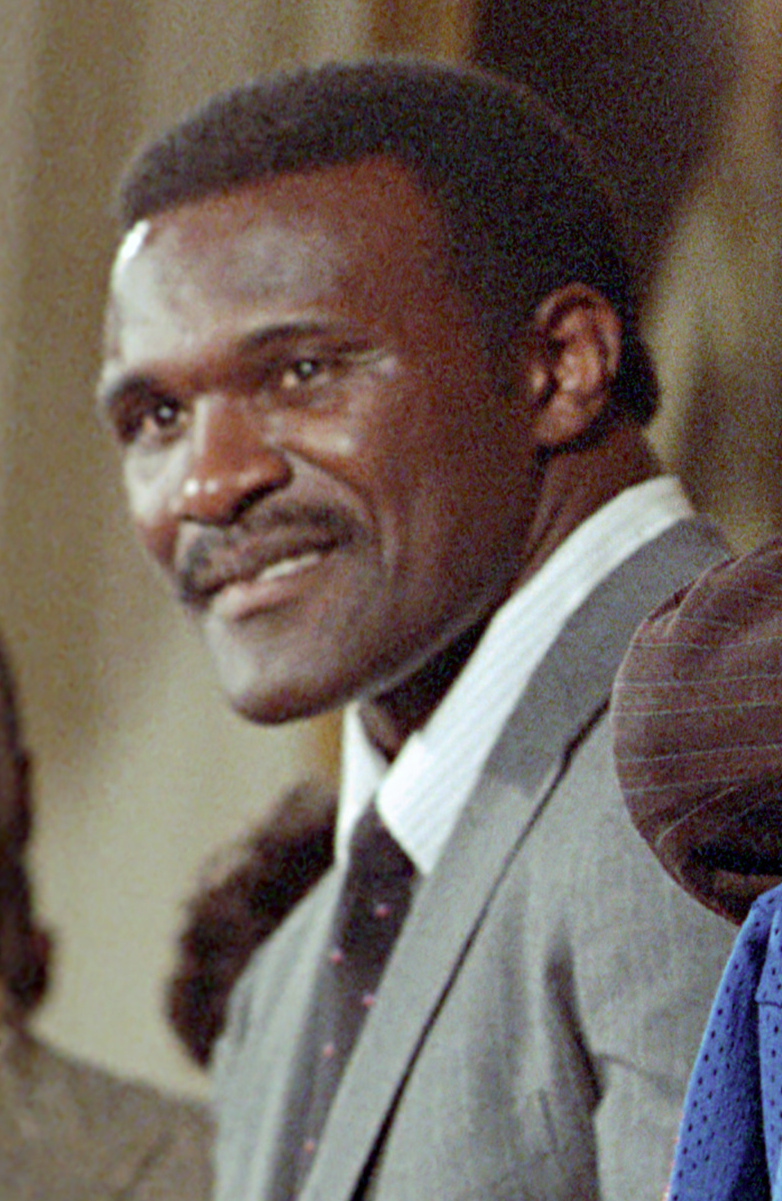
Carson at the White House in 1987

During his Hall of Fame speech in 2006 Harry Carson does not directly mention CTE, but he does mention that he does not think the NFL is doing the best job they can to help out ex-NFL players. He states "I would hope that the leaders of the NFL, the future commissioner, and the player association do a much better job of looking out for those individuals. You got to look out for 'em. If we made the league what it is, you have to take better care of your own" (Carson). Carson takes an aggressive stand when it comes to CTE and how the NFL handles their own ex-players that are struggling with head trauma later in their lives. Although Harry Carson was an excellent football player he does suggest that kids not start playing football because of the consequences that could come to them later in life. The NFL reached a concussion settlement of 765 million dollars for the former NFL players that sustained head injuries on the field. When Carson was asked about the settlement in a Frontline interview he says, "And so I think everyone now has a better sense of what damage you can get from playing football. And I think the NFL has given everybody 765 million reasons why you don't want to play football" (Carson). Harry Carson thinks the huge settlement is good for the former players, but it also scares people away from playing football because of the chances of head trauma players could experience later in life.

== After football ==
Carson remains in close involvement with the Giants. He has also had a successful career in sports broadcasting and has his own company, Harry Carson Inc., which deals mainly in sports consulting and promotions. Carson was also part-owner of the Arena Football League's New Jersey Red Dogs, alongside ex-Giants Carl Banks and Joe Morris. He currently co-hosts Giants 1st & 10 on Madison Square Garden Network with Bob Papa, Carl Banks and Howard Cross.

On May 17, 2015, Harry Carson served as the commencement speaker for New York University School of Professional Studies. Two days later Carson served as the commencement speaker and was presented with an honorary Doctor of Humane Letters Degree from Fairleigh Dickinson University at MetLife Stadium in New Jersey. The honor was bestowed upon Carson for his advocacy not only for his football brethren but for anyone who lives with the effects of a traumatic brain injury. Carson simply says "I have to speak up for all people who really don't have a voice".

Carson is a long-time resident of Franklin Lakes, New Jersey.

== Health issues ==
Since his retirement, Carson has lived with various physical maladies brought on by injuries incurred during his playing days. He was diagnosed with post-concussion syndrome in 1990, and estimates that he had 15 concussions during his long high school, college and professional football career. In 1992, he stated: "I don't think as clearly as I used to. Nor is my speech, diction, selection of vocabulary is as good as it used to be, and I don't know why." In 2001 while he was a broadcaster with the MSG Network he said, "I would mispronounce words and lose my train of thought. Things would happen, and at times I'd think I was going crazy."

Carson authored his second book "Captain for Life" published by St. Martin's Press in 2011. In his book he documents his experiences with post-concussion syndrome. He was one of the first former professional athletes to share his own personal first hand experiences years before the long-term effects of concussions and chronic traumatic encephalopathy (CTE), long before the subject became a "hot button" topic.

While Carson has acknowledged he has "managed" the long term effects of concussions he does not know if he has been affected by chronic traumatic encephalopathy (CTE). When asked, Carson is increasingly critical of the NFL and questions whether football should be played, as he believes the hazards of concussions and subconcussive hits are not an understood risk such as physical ailments are. He is quoted in this interview as saying of the NFL's $765 million settlement with former players that "the NFL has given everybody 765 million reasons why you don't want to play football."

In March 2018, Carson joined with former NFL stars Nick Buoniconti and Phil Villapiano to support a parent initiative called Flag Football Under 14, which recommends no tackle football below that age out of a concern for the brain health of the young players. He said, "I did not play tackle football until high school, I will not allow my grandson to play until 14, as I believe it is not an appropriate sport for young children."

== Politics ==
In 2012, Carson was said to be strongly considering a run for Congress against Republican Scott Garrett in the newly redrawn 5th congressional district of New Jersey. His campaign never came to pass.
