= Lawrence Taylor =

American football player (born 1959)

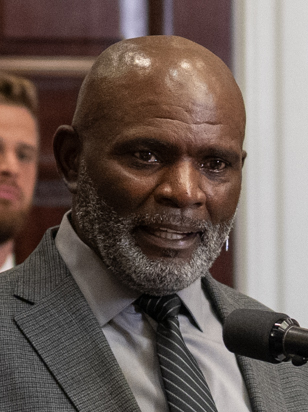
- Taylor in 2025

No. 56
- Position: Linebacker

Personal information
- Born: February 4, 1959 (age 67); Williamsburg, Virginia, U.S.
- Listed height: 6 ft 3 in (1.91 m)
- Listed weight: 237 lb (108 kg)

Career information
- High school: Lafayette (Williamsburg)
- College: North Carolina (1977–1980)
- NFL draft: 1981: 1st round, 2nd overall pick

Career history
- New York Giants (1981–1993)

Awards and highlights
- 2× Super Bowl champion (XXI, XXV); NFL Most Valuable Player (1986); 3× NFL Defensive Player of the Year (1981, 1982, 1986); NFL Defensive Rookie of the Year (1981); 2× UPI NFC Player of the Year (1983, 1986); 8× First-team All-Pro (1981–1986, 1988, 1989); 2× Second-team All-Pro (1987, 1990); 10× Pro Bowl (1981–1990); NFL sacks leader (1986); NFL 1980s All-Decade Team; NFL 75th Anniversary All-Time Team; NFL 100th Anniversary All-Time Team; New York Giants Ring of Honor; New York Giants No. 56 retired; Greatest New York Giant of all-time; Unanimous All-American (1980); ACC Player of the Year (1980); ACC 50th Anniversary Team; Second-team AP All-Time All-American (2025); North Carolina Tar Heels Jersey No. 98 honored

Career NFL statistics
- Tackles: 1,088
- Sacks: 142
- Fumble recoveries: 11
- Interceptions: 9
- Defensive touchdowns: 2
- Stats at Pro Football Reference
- Pro Football Hall of Fame

Lawrence Julius Taylor (born February 4, 1959), nicknamed "L.T.", is an American former professional football linebacker who played in the National Football League (NFL) for 13 seasons with the New York Giants. He is widely regarded as the greatest defensive player of all time – and considered by some as the best football player ever.

After an All-American career at the University of North Carolina at Chapel Hill (1978–1981), Taylor was selected by the Giants second overall in the 1981 NFL draft. Although controversy surrounded the selection due to Taylor's contract demands, the two sides quickly resolved the issue. Taylor was named both the NFL Defensive Rookie of the Year in 1981 and the only NFL player to win the AP NFL Defensive Player of the Year award in his rookie season. Throughout the 1980s and early 1990s, Taylor was a disruptive force at outside linebacker, and is credited with changing defensive game plans, defensive pass rushing schemes, offensive line blocking schemes, and offensive formations used in the NFL. Taylor produced double-digit sacks each season from 1984 through 1990, including a career-high of 20.5 in 1986. He also won a record three AP NFL Defensive Player of the Year awards (since tied by J. J. Watt and Aaron Donald), and was named the league's Most Valuable Player (MVP) for his performance during the 1986 season. He and Alan Page (1971) are the only defensive players in league history to earn the award. Taylor was named First-team All-Pro in eight of his first ten seasons, and Second-team All-Pro in the other two. Taylor was a key member of the Giants' defense, nicknamed the "Big Blue Wrecking Crew", that led New York to victories in Super Bowls XXI and XXV. During the 1980s Taylor, Carl Banks, Gary Reasons, Brad Van Pelt, Brian Kelley, Pepper Johnson, and Hall of Famer Harry Carson earned the Giants linebacking corps a reputation as one of the best in the NFL, along with the nickname "Crunch Bunch."

Taylor has lived a controversial lifestyle, during and after his playing career. He was known for his on-game persona and at one point inadvertently caused a compound fracture of the right leg of quarterback Joe Theismann. He admitted to using drugs such as cocaine as early as his second year in the NFL, and was suspended for 30 days in 1988 by the league for failing drug tests. His drug abuse escalated after his retirement, and he was jailed three times for attempted drug possession. From 1998 to 2009, Taylor claims to have lived a sober, drug-free life. He worked as a color commentator on sporting events after his retirement, and pursued a career as an actor. His personal life came under public scrutiny in 2010 when he was arrested for the statutory rape of a 16-year-old girl. After the girl admitted that she had claimed to be 19 years old, Taylor pleaded guilty to sexual misconduct and patronizing a prostitute, and was registered as a low-risk sex offender.

== Early life ==
Taylor was the first of three sons born to Clarence and Iris Taylor in Williamsburg, Virginia. His father worked as a dispatcher at the Newport News shipyards, while his mother was a schoolteacher. Referred to as Lonnie by his family, Taylor was a mischievous youth. His mother said that "[h]e was a challenging child. Where the other two boys would ask for permission to do stuff, Lonnie ... would just do it, and when you found out about it, he would give you a big story." Taylor concentrated on baseball as a youth, playing catcher, and only began playing football at the advanced age of fifteen. He did not play organized high school football until the following year (eleventh grade), and was not heavily recruited coming out of high school.

== College career ==
After graduating from Lafayette High School in 1977, Taylor attended the University of North Carolina at Chapel Hill where he was a team captain, and wore No. 98. Originally recruited as a defensive lineman, he saw limited action at the position while mostly playing on special teams as a true freshman. During an injury-plagued sophomore season, he played primarily as a defensive lineman before switching to linebacker in 1979.

As a junior, Taylor recorded 95 tackles (80 solo), five sacks, seven forced fumbles, and an interception. In his senior season in 1980, Taylor set multiple team records, including a still-standing mark of 16 sacks, and finished with 22 tackles for loss. That same year, he was recognized as a consensus first-team All-American and the Atlantic Coast Conference Player of the Year, one of four defensive players to ever win the award. He was also a semi-finalist for the Lombardi Award.

The coaching staff marveled at Taylor's intense, reckless style of play. "As a freshman playing on special teams, he'd jump a good six or seven feet in the air to block a punt, then land on the back of his neck", said North Carolina assistant coach Bobby Cale. "He was reckless, just reckless." UNC later retired Taylor's jersey.

== Professional career ==
=== 1981 NFL draft and training camp ===
In the 1981 NFL draft, Taylor was selected by the New York Giants in the first round as the 2nd pick overall. In a poll of NFL general managers (GMs) taken before the draft 26 of the league's 28 GMs said if they had the first selection they would select Taylor. One of the two GMs who said they would not take Taylor was Bum Phillips, who had just been hired as coach and general manager by the New Orleans Saints. As fate would have it for Taylor, the Saints were also the team who had the first pick in the draft. Giants GM George Young predicted before the draft that he would be better than NFL legends such as Dick Butkus: "Taylor is the best college linebacker I've ever seen. Sure, I saw Dick Butkus play. There's no doubt in my mind about Taylor. He's bigger and stronger than Butkus was. On the blitz, he's devastating."

On draft day, Phillips made good on his promise not to draft Taylor and the Saints instead selected Heisman Trophy-winning halfback George Rogers with the first pick, leaving the Giants with the decision of whether to select Taylor. To the raucous approval of the crowd in attendance at the draft (which was held in New York City), the Giants selected him. Privately, Taylor was hesitant about playing for New York as he had hoped to be drafted by the Dallas Cowboys, and was unimpressed with a tour of Giants Stadium he was taken on, after the draft. Publicly, however, he expressed excitement about the opportunity to play in the city. Taylor changed his stance after he was drafted as Harry Carson made a point to reach out to him, and Taylor said he "talked to some players and coaches" and "got things straightened out." One of the factors that the Giants said they considered in selecting Taylor was his solid reputation. "He was the cleanest player in the draft. By that I mean there was no rap on him", said head coach Ray Perkins. "Great potential as a linebacker, a fine young man, free of injuries." Taylor chose to wear number 56 because he was a fan of Cowboys linebacker Thomas Henderson. As it would turn out, Taylor would have a longer and more successful career than Rogers, who had several 1,000-yard rushing seasons and made two Pro Bowl teams but was injury-prone and forced to retire after just seven seasons in 1987.

Taylor's talent was evident from the start of training camp. Reports came out of the Giants training compound of the exploits of the new phenom. Taylor's teammates took to calling him Superman and joked that his locker should be replaced with a phone booth. Phil Simms, the team's quarterback, said, "on the pass rush, he's an animal. He's either going to run around you or over you. With his quickness, he's full speed after two steps." Taylor made his NFL exhibition debut on August 8, 1981, recording 2 sacks in the Giants' 23–7 win over the Chicago Bears. Before the season word spread around the league about Taylor. Years after facing him in an exhibition game, Pittsburgh Steelers quarterback Terry Bradshaw recalled, "[h]e dang-near killed me, I just kept saying, 'Who is this guy?' He kept coming from my blind side and just ripped my ribs to pieces."

Taylor developed what has been described as a "love-hate relationship" with Bill Parcells, the Giants’ defensive coordinator when he was drafted and later their head coach. Parcells often rode players in the hopes of driving them to better performance. Taylor did not appreciate this approach, and early on told Parcells, "I've had enough. You either cut me or trade me but get the fuck off my back." Parcells kept on Taylor, but privately told some veterans, "I like that LT. That motherfucker's got a mean streak."

=== Early career: 1981–1985 ===
Taylor made his NFL regular season debut on September 6, 1981, in a 24–10 loss to the Philadelphia Eagles. Aside from incurring a penalty for a late hit on Eagles running back Perry Harrington, Taylor played an unremarkable game. In a game versus the St. Louis Cardinals later in the season, Taylor rushed and sacked the passer when he was supposed to drop into coverage. When told by Parcells that was not what he was assigned to do on that play, and that what he did was not in the playbook, Taylor responded "Well, we better put it in on Monday, because that play's a dandy." He recorded 9.5 sacks in 1981, and his rookie season is considered one of the best in NFL history. He was named 1981's NFL Defensive Rookie of the Year and Defensive Player of the Year. Taylor's arrival helped the Giants defense reduce their points allowed from 425 points in 1980 to 257 in 1981. They finished the season 9–7, up five games from the previous season, and advanced to the NFL divisional playoffs, where they lost 38–24 to the eventual Super Bowl champion San Francisco 49ers. The San Francisco win was due partly to a new tactic 49ers coach Bill Walsh used to slow Taylor. Walsh assigned guard John Ayers, the team's best blocker, to block Taylor and, although Taylor still recorded a sack and three tackles, he was not as effective as normal. In contrast to his on-field success Taylor was already developing a reputation for recklessness off the field; after nearly getting killed during the season when his speeding resulted in a car crash, Young told the team's trainer he would be surprised if the linebacker lived past the age of 30, and the Giants insured Taylor's life for $2 million.

The 1982 NFL season, which was shortened to nine regular season games by a players strike, included one of the more memorable plays of Taylor's career. In the nationally televised Thanksgiving Day game against the Detroit Lions, the teams were tied 6–6 early in the fourth quarter, when the Lions drove deep into New York territory. Lions quarterback Gary Danielson dropped back to pass and threw the ball out to his left toward the sidelines. Taylor ran in front of the intended receiver, intercepted the pass, and returned it 97 yards for a touchdown. This play was indicative of Taylor's unusual combination, even for a linebacker, of power with speed. He was again named Defensive Player of the Year.

After the 1982 season, Perkins became head coach of the University of Alabama and the Giants hired Parcells to replace him. In the coming years this change proved crucial to the Giants and Taylor. Leading up to the 1983 season, Taylor engaged in a training camp holdout that lasted three weeks and ended when he came back to the team under his old contract with three games left in the preseason.

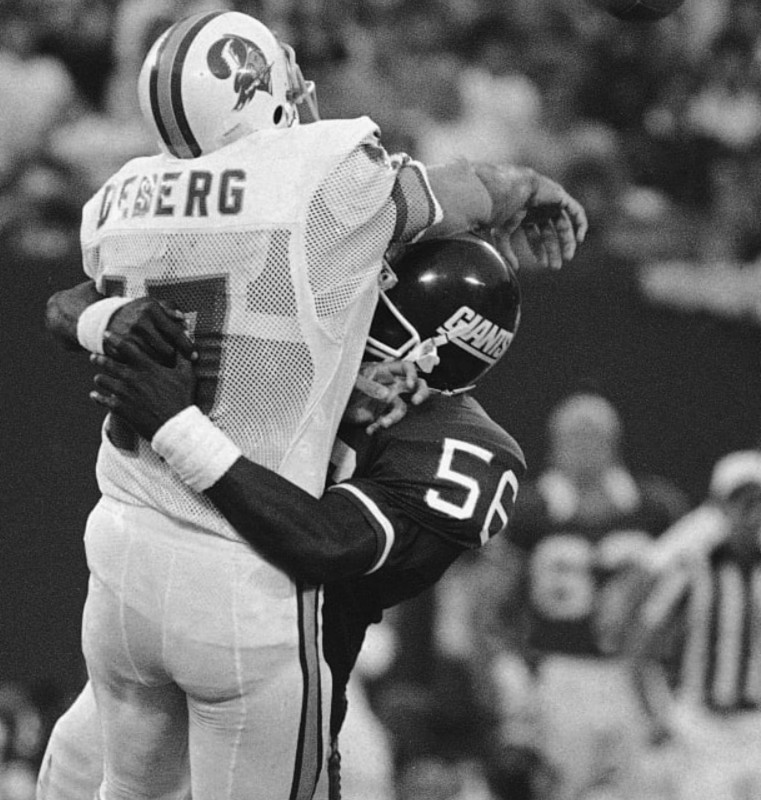
Taylor tackles Steve DeBerg on September 23, 1984

Although Taylor recorded nine sacks and made the All-Pro team for the third consecutive season in 1983, the Giants struggled. The team went 3–12–1, and Parcells received heavy criticism from fans and the media. Taylor was forced to play inside linebacker for part of the season, a position which allowed him fewer pass rushing opportunities, when Carson was injured. Despite this change, Taylor made the 1983 All-Pro Team at both outside linebacker and inside linebacker, becoming the first first-team All-Pro in NFL History selected for two positions in the same year. Frustrated by the losing, Taylor began acting out by arriving late for meetings, and not participating in conditioning drills in practice. After the season, Taylor was involved in a fight for his services between the Giants and the New Jersey Generals of the United States Football League. Taylor was given a $1 million interest-free, 25-year loan by Generals owner Donald Trump on December 14, 1983, with the provision that he begin playing in the USFL in 1988. Taylor regretted the decision, and less than a month later attempted to renege. His agent was able to negotiate by meeting with Trump personally and then the Giants which resulted in allowing Taylor to go with the Giants. Taylor got a 6-year, $6.55 million package that also included a $1 million interest-free loan. The main results of these negotiations were threefold: 1) Taylor returned the $1 million to Trump, 2) the Giants paid Trump $750,000 over the next five seasons, and 3) the Giants gave Taylor a new six-year, $6.2 million contract.

The Giants' record rebounded to 9–7 in 1984, and Taylor had his fourth All-Pro season. He got off to a quick start, recording four sacks in a September game. In the playoffs the Giants defeated the Los Angeles Rams 16–13, but lost 21–10 to the eventual champion 49ers.

In contrast to the previous season the Giants headed into the 1985 season with a sense of optimism after their successful 1984 campaign and a 5–0 pre-season record. The Giants went 10–6, and Taylor spearheaded a defense that led the NFL in sacks with 68. Taylor had 13. One of the more memorable plays of his career occurred during this season. On a Monday Night Football game against the Redskins, Taylor's sack of Redskins quarterback Joe Theismann inadvertently resulted in a compound fracture of Theismann's right leg. After the sack, a distraught Taylor screamed for paramedics to attend to Theismann. Although this sack ended Theismann's career, Theismann has never blamed Taylor for the injury. Taylor says he has never seen video of the play and never wants to. During the first round of the playoffs, the Giants defeated the defending champion 49ers 17–3, but lost to the eventual champion Chicago Bears in the second round 21–0.

=== Mid-career and championships: 1986–1990 ===
In 1986, Taylor had one of the most successful seasons by a defensive player in the history of the NFL. He recorded a league-leading 20.5 sacks and became one of just two defensive players to win the NFL Most Valuable Player award and the only defensive player to be the unanimous selection for MVP. He also was named Defensive Player of the Year for the third time. The Giants finished the season 14–2 and outscored San Francisco and Washington by a combined score of 66–3 in the NFC playoffs. He appeared on the cover of Sports Illustrated alone the week leading up to Super Bowl XXI with a warning from the magazine to the Denver Broncos regarding Taylor. The Giants overcame a slow start in Super Bowl XXI to defeat Denver 39–20. Taylor made a key touchdown-preventing tackle on a goal line play in the first half, stopping Broncos quarterback John Elway as he sprinted out on a rollout.

With the Super Bowl win, Taylor capped off an unprecedented start to his career. After six years, he had been named the NFL Defensive Rookie of the Year Award (1981), NFL Defensive Player of the Year a record three times (1981, 1982, 1986), First-team All-Pro six times, become the first defensive player in NFL history unanimously voted the league's MVP (1986), and led his team to a championship (1986). After the win, however, Taylor felt let down rather than elated. Taylor said:

When the Super Bowl was over ... Everyone was so excited, but by then I felt deflated. I'd won every award, had my best season, finally won the Super Bowl. I was on top of the world right? So what could be next? Nothing. The thrill is the chase to get to the top. Every day the excitement builds and builds and builds, and then when you're finally there and the game is over ... And then, nothing.

The Giants appeared to have a bright future coming off their 1986 championship season as they were one of the younger teams in the league. They struggled the next season however, falling to 6–9 in the strike-shortened 1987 season. Taylor caused strife in the locker room when he broke the picket line after early struggles by the team. He explained his decision by saying "The Giants are losing. And I'm losing $60,000 a week." He finished the season as the team leader in sacks with 12 in 12 games played, but missed a game due to a hamstring injury, ending his consecutive games played streak at 106.

The Giants looked to rebound to their championship ways in 1988 but the start of the season was marred by controversy surrounding Taylor. He tested positive for cocaine and was suspended by the league for thirty days, as it was his second violation of the NFL's substance abuse policy. The first result in 1987 had been kept private and was not known to the public at the time. He was kept away from the press during this period and checked himself into rehab in early September. Taylor's over-the-edge lifestyle was becoming an increasing concern for fans and team officials. This was especially true given the eventual career paths of talented players like Hollywood Henderson and others whose drug problems derailed their careers. The Giants went 2–2 in the games Taylor missed. When Taylor returned he was his usual dominant self as he led the team in sacks again, with 15.5 in 12 games played. The season also contained some of the more memorable moments of Taylor's career. In a crucial late-season game with playoff implications against the New Orleans Saints, Taylor played through a torn pectoral muscle to record seven tackles, three sacks, and two forced fumbles. Taylor's presence in the lineup was important as the Giants' offense was having trouble mounting drives, and was dominated in time of possession. Television cameras repeatedly cut to the sidelines to show him in extreme physical pain as he was being attended to by the Giants staff. Taylor had already developed a reputation for playing through pain; in a 1983 game against the Eagles the team's training staff had to hide his helmet to prevent the injured Taylor from returning to the field. Taylor's shoulder was so injured that he had to wear a harness to keep it in its place. The Giants held on for a 13–12 win, and Parcells later called Taylor's performance "[t]he greatest game I ever saw." However, the Giants narrowly missed the playoffs in 1988 at 10–6 by losing tie-breakers with the Eagles in their division and the Rams for the Wild card.

In 1989, Taylor recorded 15 sacks. He was forced to play the latter portion of the season with a fractured tibia, suffered in a 34–24 loss to the 49ers in week 12, which caused him to sit out the second half of several games. Despite his off-the-field problems, Taylor remained popular among his teammates and was voted defensive co-captain along with Carl Banks. The two filled the defensive captain's spot vacated by the retired Harry Carson. The retirement of the nine-time Pro Bowler Carson, broke up the Giants linebacker corps of Carson, Reasons, Banks, and Taylor, which spearheaded the team's defense nicknamed the "Big Blue Wrecking Crew" in the 1980s. The Giants went 12–4, and advanced to the playoffs. In an exciting, down-to-the-wire game, the Rams eliminated the Giants 19–13 in the first round, despite Taylor's two sacks and one forced fumble.

Taylor held out of training camp before the 1990 season, demanding a new contract with a salary of $2 million per year. Talks dragged into September with neither side budging, and as the season approached Taylor received fines at the rate of $2,500 a day. He signed a three-year $5 million contract (making him the highest paid defensive player in the league) just four days before the season opener against the Philadelphia Eagles. Despite sitting out training camp and the preseason, Taylor recorded three sacks and a forced fumble against the Eagles. He finished with 10.5 sacks and earned his 10th Pro Bowl in as many years, although the season marked the first time in Taylor's career that he was not selected First-team All-Pro. The Giants started out 10–0 and finished with a 13–3 record. In the playoffs, the Giants defeated the Bears 31–3, and faced the rival 49ers in the NFC Championship Game. The Giants won 15–13, after Taylor beat two successive blocks by 49ers tight end Brent Jones and fullback Tom Rathman to get into the 49ers offensive backfield to be in position to recover a key fumble by Roger Craig forced by nose tackle Erik Howard late in the game to set up Matt Bahr's game-winning field goal. In Super Bowl XXV, they played the Buffalo Bills and won one of the more entertaining Super Bowls in history, 20-19, after Buffalo's Scott Norwood missed a potential game-winning field goal in the closing seconds of the game.

=== Final years and decline: 1991–1993 ===
Following the 1990 season, Parcells, with whom Taylor had become very close, retired, and the team was taken over by Ray Handley. 1991 marked a steep decline in Taylor's production. It became the first season in his career in which he failed to make the Pro Bowl squad, after setting a then record by making it in his first ten years in the league. Taylor finished with 7 sacks in 14 games and the Giants defense, while still respectable, was no longer one of the top units in the league.

Taylor rebounded in the early stages of what many thought would be his final season in 1992. Through close to nine games, Taylor was on pace for 10 sacks and the Giants were 5–4. However, a ruptured Achilles tendon suffered in a game on November 8, 1992, against Green Bay sidelined him for the final seven games, during which the team went 1–6. Before the injury Taylor had missed only four games due to injury in his 12-year career. Throughout the 1992 season, and the ensuing offseason, Taylor was noncommittal about his future, alternately saying he might retire, then later hinting he wanted a longer-term contract.

Taylor returned for the 1993 season enticed by the chance to play with a new coach (Dan Reeves), and determined not to end his career due to an injury. The Giants had a resurgent season in 1993. They finished 11–5, and competed for the top NFC playoff seed. Taylor finished with 6 sacks, and the Giants defense led the NFL in fewest points allowed. They defeated the Minnesota Vikings 17–10 in the opening round of the playoffs. The next week on January 15, 1994, in what would be Taylor's final game, the Giants were beaten 44–3 by the San Francisco 49ers. As the game came to a conclusion, television cameras drew in close on Taylor who was crying. He announced his retirement at the post-game press conference saying, "I think it's time for me to retire. I've done everything I can do. I've been to Super Bowls. I've been to playoffs. I've done things that other people haven't been able to do in this game before. After 13 years, it's time for me to go."

Taylor ended his career with 1,089 tackles, 132.5 sacks (plus 9.5 tallied as a rookie before the stat was officially recognized), nine interceptions, 134 return yards, two touchdowns, 33 forced fumbles (56 verified by video), 11 fumble recoveries, and 34 fumble return yards.

== Legacy ==
He arrived in the NFL, like an emissary from another planet.

— Paul Zimmerman (sportswriter)

Lawrence Taylor, defensively, has had as big an impact as any player I've ever seen. He changed the way defense is played, the way pass-rushing is played, the way linebackers play and the way offenses block linebackers.

— John Madden

Taylor is considered one of the best players to ever play in the NFL, and has been ranked as the top defensive player in league history by some news outlets, media members, former players and coaches. He has also been described as one of the most "feared" and "intimidating" players in NFL history. Taylor's explosive speed and power is credited with changing the outside linebacker position from one of "read and react" to aggression and attack.

I always get a kick out of people that talk about, 'Well, this player was like that player,' It’s like, 'Listen, no, there isn’t another Lawrence Taylor.' To me, he’s the standard by which you measure everything.

— Joe Theismann

Washington Redskins head coach Joe Gibbs developed the two tight end offense and the position of H-back to prevent Taylor from blitzing into the backfield unhindered. "We had to try in some way have a special game plan just for Lawrence Taylor. Now you didn't do that very often in this league but I think he's one person that we learned the lesson the hard way. We lost ball games." His skills changed the way offensive coaches blocked linebackers. In the late '70s and early '80s, a blitzing linebacker was picked up by a running back. However, these players were no match for Taylor. The tactic employed by San Francisco 49ers head coach Bill Walsh in the 1982 playoffs, using an offensive guard to block Taylor, was copied around the league. However, this left a hole in pass protection that a blitzing middle linebacker could exploit. Later, Walsh and other coaches began using offensive tackles to block Taylor. Later it became common for offensive linemen to pick up blitzing linebackers. In addition to the changes in offensive schemes Taylor influenced, he also introduced new defensive techniques to the game, such as chopping the ball out of a quarterback's hands (to potentially force a more valuable turnover) rather than simply tackling him for a loss. This exemplified a team-first strategy that dampened Taylor’s sack totals while increasing the prospects of Giants success.

== Drug and lifestyle problems ==
For me, crazy as it seems, there is a real relationship between wild, reckless abandon off the field and being that way on the field.

— Taylor, in 1987

Taylor began using illicit drugs during his professional rookie season, 1981–1982. He would pass the NFL's drug tests, however, by routinely obtaining his teammates' urine to submit as his own urine samples.

As his drug habit escalated, he would spend up to thousands of dollars a day on "coke and women." His first wife, Linda, once had to pick him up from a crack house. And he once attended a team meeting still handcuffed from the night before by some "ladies that were trying out some new equipment", but "just didn't happen to have the key", he would recall.

In 1987, he finally tested positive for cocaine, and admitted to using it. The next year, 1988, he failed a second drug test, whereupon the NFL suspended him for 30 days. With that, he abstained from drugs until his 1993 retirement, as a third failed drug test would end his career. Yet he would later recall that in retiring, "I saw blow as the only bright spot in my future."

During 1995, he went through drug rehab twice. But over the next three years, he was arrested twice, via undercover police officers, for attempts to buy cocaine. Meanwhile, he associated mainly with drug users, and his home usually had white sheets over its windows. "I had gotten really bad. I mean my place was almost like a crack house," Taylor would later explain.

== Post-NFL life ==
=== Investments ===
In Taylor's final year in the NFL, he started a company called All-Pro Products. The company went public at $5 a share, and tripled in value during its first month. The stock price reached $16.50 a share, at which point Taylor's stake had an estimated value of over $10 million. The company ceased production shortly thereafter however, and Taylor, who never sold his stock, lost several hundred thousand dollars. He had been defrauded by several members of the penny stock firm Hanover Sterling & Company, who had shorted the company's stock and rendered it worthless. The Securities and Exchange Commission ruled that two traders had manipulated the price of the stock, which skyrocketed while the company was losing over $900,000.

=== Tax issues ===
In 1997, Taylor pleaded guilty to filing a false tax return in 1990, and in 2000 he was "sentenced to three months of house arrest, five years of probation, and 500 hours of community service for tax evasion."

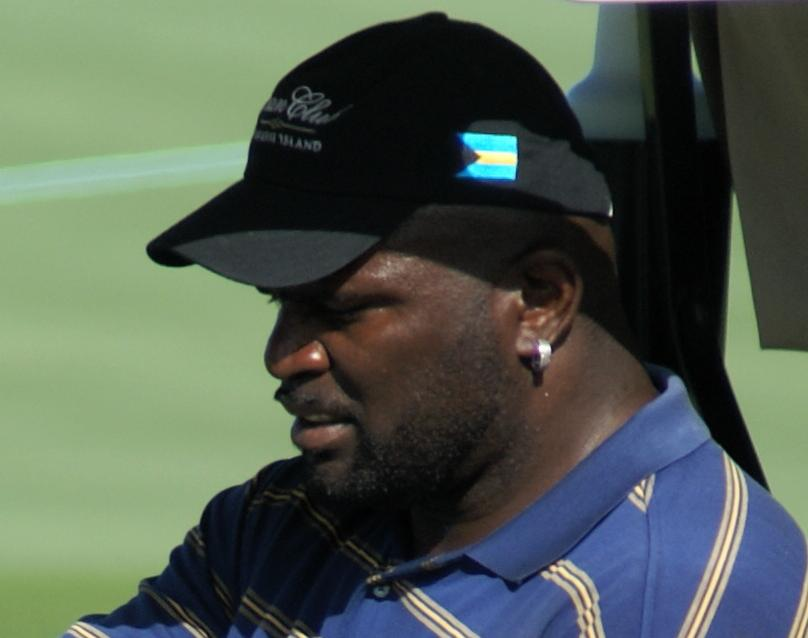
Taylor on the golf course in 2007

=== Television pundit ===
After his career ended, Taylor worked in several regular television jobs. He first worked as a football analyst for the now defunct TNT Sunday Night Football. In a one-off show, Taylor also appeared as a wrestler in the World Wrestling Federation, defeating Bam Bam Bigelow in the main event of WrestleMania XI. He also worked as a color commentator on an amateur fighting program entitled Toughman on the FX channel. On September 4, 1995, the Giants retired Phil Simms' jersey during halftime of a game against the Cowboys (Taylor had his number retired the year before). Simms celebrated the moment by throwing an impromptu ceremonial pass to Taylor. Simms recalled, "[a]ll of a sudden it kind of hit me, I've put Lawrence in a really tough spot; national TV, he's got dress shoes and a sports jacket on, and he's had a few beers and he's going to run down the field and I'm going to throw him a pass." Simms motioned for Taylor to run a long pattern and after 30–40 yards threw him the pass. Taylor later said the situation made him more nervous than any play of his career, "I'm saying to myself (as the pass is being thrown), 'If I drop this pass, I got to run my black ass all the way back to Upper Saddle River because there ain't no way I'm going to be able to stay in that stadium'." Taylor caught the pass, however, and the capacity crowd in attendance cheered in approval.

=== Movies & video games ===
Taylor pursued a career in acting, appearing in the Oliver Stone movie Any Given Sunday where he played a character much like himself. He appeared as himself in the HBO series The Sopranos and the film The Waterboy. He also had a role in the 2000 version of Shaft. Taylor voiced the steroid-riddled, possibly insane former football player B.J. Smith in the video game, Grand Theft Auto: Vice City. The character poked fun at his fearsome, drug-fueled public image. He also added his voice to the video game Blitz: The League and its sequel, which were partially based on his life in the NFL. He also acted in the 2000 Christian film Mercy Streets with Eric Roberts and Stacy Keach, and the 2003 prison movie In Hell with Jean-Claude Van Damme.

=== Hall of Fame induction ===
In 1999, when Taylor became eligible for the Pro Football Hall of Fame, there were some concerns his hard-partying lifestyle and drug abuse would hurt his candidacy. These concerns proved to be ill-founded, however, as he was voted in on the first ballot. His son Lawrence Taylor Jr. gave his introduction speech at the induction ceremony. Taylor's ex-wife, his three children, and his parents were in attendance and during his induction speech Taylor acknowledged them saying, "thank you for putting up with me for all those years." He also credited former Giants owner Wellington Mara for being supportive of him saying, "[h]e probably cared more about me as a person than he really should have."

=== Autobiography ===
In 2004, Taylor released an autobiography, LT: Over the Edge. Taylor often spoke of his NFL years, which he played with reckless abandon, and the drug-abusing stages of his life as the "L.T." periods of his life. He described "L.T." as an adrenaline junkie who lived life on a thrill ride. Taylor said in 2003 that "L. T. died a long time ago, and I don't miss him at all ... all that's left is Lawrence Taylor."

=== Advertising and television ===
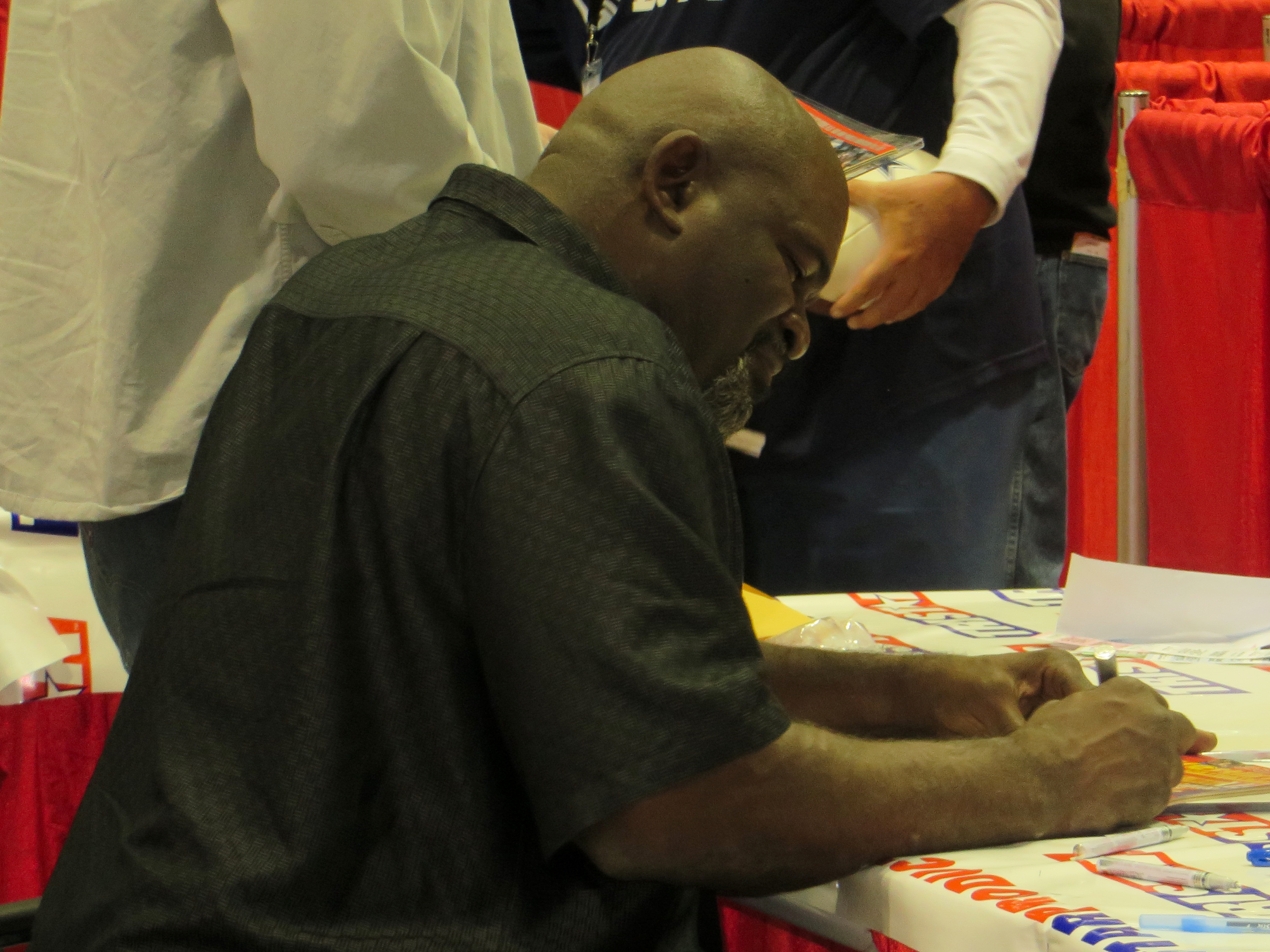
Taylor signing autographs at a collectors show in Houston in January 2014

Taylor re-emerged into the public eye in July 2006, after appearing on the cover of a Sports Illustrated issue dedicated to former athletes and sport figures. In the magazine, Taylor credited his hobby of golf with helping him get over his previous hard-partying ways and drug filled lifestyle. He co-founded eXfuze, a network marketing company based in West Palm Beach, Florida. Along with former NFL players, such as Eric Dickerson and Seth Joyner, he was a spokesman for Seven+, the flagship multi-botanical drink produced by the company. His son Brandon signed a national letter to play with the Purdue Boilermakers. Taylor was a contestant on the 8th season of Dancing with the Stars, partnered with Edyta Śliwińska. He was eliminated in the seventh week on the April 21, 2009, show.

=== Legal troubles ===
In 2009, Taylor started having troubles in his personal life again. On November 8, he was arrested in Miami-Dade County, Florida for leaving the scene of an accident after striking another vehicle with his Cadillac Escalade. He had already committed the same offense in 1996 when he totaled his Lexus in a one-car accident and left the scene, saying he did not think the law required the reporting of a single driver incident. He was released on a $500 bond, and the other driver later sued him, seeking $15,000.

In May 2010, Taylor was arrested for statutory rape of a 16-year-old girl, at a Holiday Inn located in Montebello, New York. He was charged with felony third-degree statutory rape, for allegedly engaging in sexual intercourse with someone under 17. He was also charged with third-degree patronization for allegedly paying the underage girl $300 to have sex with him. The girl told investigators that her pimp commanded her to tell Taylor that she was 19, which Taylor corroborated. The pimp, 36-year old Rasheed Davis, was charged with federal child sex trafficking. The girl was represented by celebrity attorney Gloria Allred when Taylor pleaded guilty on March 22, 2011. Taylor was sentenced to six years probation as part of a plea agreement, in which he pleaded guilty to the misdemeanors of sexual misconduct and patronizing a prostitute. He also registered as a low-risk, level-one sex offender. On October 26, 2012, a court rejected the victim's claims that Taylor assaulted her.

As of 2016, Taylor resides in Pembroke Pines, Florida. On June 9, 2016, Taylor's wife was arrested for domestic violence in Florida after she threw "an unknown object" and struck Taylor in the back of the head. By 2021, Taylor was once again divorced.

In May 2017, Taylor put up for auction the Vince Lombardi mini statue he had won for the Super Bowl XXV win. The next month he pleaded guilty to driving under the influence of alcohol following a September 2, 2016 crash into a stopped police car in Palm Beach County, Florida. The two breathalyzer tests taken five hours after the crash measured Taylor's blood-alcohol level at .082 and .084, above the Florida legal limit of .080.

In December 2021, Taylor was arrested after again failing to report his new address, which was required due to his status as a registered sex offender. He was released shortly afterwards after posting a $500 bail. Taylor blamed his recent divorce for not updating authorities about the 2021 address change. In July 2024, Taylor was arrested in Florida after once again failing to report a new residency, which again resulted in Taylor avoiding to properly register as a sex offender. After turning himself in, Taylor was released with no bail after spending several hours in the main Broward County jail. For this second offense, Taylor was criminally charged. Taylor's attorney has stated that Taylor would plead not guilty, describing the incident as a "misunderstanding" rather than a criminal offense.

=== Public service ===
In 2025, Taylor was appointed by President Donald Trump to serve on the President's Council on Sports, Fitness, and Nutrition.

== NFL career statistics ==
Legend
	AP NFL MVP & DPOTY
	NFL Defensive Player of the Year
	Team won the Super Bowl
	Led the league
**Bold**	Career high

=== Regular season ===
Year	Team	Games		Sacks	Interceptions			Fumbles			
Year	Team	GP	GS	Sacks	Int	Yds	TD	FF	FR	Yds	TD
1981	NYG	16	16	9.5*	1	1	0	4	1	4	0
1982	NYG	9	8	7.5	1	**97**	**1**	2	0	0	0
1983	NYG	16	16	9.0	2	10	0	2	**2**	3	0
1984	NYG	16	16	11.5	1	–1	0	**5**	0	0	0
1985	NYG	16	16	13.0	0	0	0	4	**2**	**25**	0
1986	NYG	16	16	**20.5**	0	0	0	2	0	0	0
1987	NYG	12	11	12.0	**3**	16	0	3	0	0	0
1988	NYG	12	12	15.5	0	0	0	**5**	1	0	0
1989	NYG	16	15	15.0	0	0	0	4	0	0	0
1990	NYG	16	16	10.5	1	11	**1**	3	1	0	0
1991	NYG	14	14	7.0	0	0	0	2	**2**	0	0
1992	NYG	9	9	5.0	0	0	0	2	1	2	0
1993	NYG	16	15	6.0	0	0	0	3	1	0	0
Career		184	180	142	9	134	2	41‡	11	34	0

* Unofficial statistic (sacks did not become an official statistic until 1982). However, this number is stated on Taylor's Pro Football Hall of Fame bio and is considered to be accurate.

‡ Official NFL / Hall of Fame archives credit Taylor with 33 forced fumbles, whereas Pro Football Reference credits him with 41 based on retroactive play-by-play gamebook data. Independent film researchers count his total at as many as 56.

== Awards and honors ==
NFL

- 2× Super Bowl champion (XXI, XXV)
- NFL Most Valuable Player (1986)
- 3× NFL Defensive Player of the Year (1981, 1982, 1986)
- NFL Defensive Rookie of the Year (1981)
- Bert Bell Award (1986)
- PFWA NFL MVP (1986)
- DC Touchdown Club NFL Player of the Year (1986)
- Sporting News NFL MVP (1986)
- 2× UPI NFC Player of the Year (1983, 1986)
- 2× 101 Awards NFC Defensive Player of the Year (1984, 1986)
- PFW NFL Defensive Player of the Year (1986)
- George Halas Trophy (1986)
- Bert Bell Memorial Trophy (1981)
- 10× Pro Bowl (1981–1990)
- 8× AP First-team All-Pro (1981–1986, 1988, 1989)
- 2× AP Second-team All-Pro (1987, 1990)
- 6× NEA First-team All-Pro (1981–1986)
- 2× NEA Second-team All-Pro (1988, 1989)
- 6× Sporting News All-Pro Team (1981, 1983–1986, 1988)
- 8× PFW All-Pro Team (1981–1984, 1986–1989)
- 9× UPI All-NFC Team (1981–1986, 1988–1990)
- 8× PFWA All-NFL Team (1981–1986, 1988, 1989)
- PFWA All-Rookie Team (1981)
- NFL sacks leader (1986)
- 4× NFL forced fumbles leader (1982, 1984, 1985, 1988) (Note: Co-led the league in 1982 with Maurice Harvey, Greg Brown, and Manu Tuiasosopo; Co-led with Richard Dent in 1985.)
- NFL approximate value leader (1985)
- NFL 1980s All-Decade Team (unanimous selection)
- NFL 75th Anniversary All-Time Team
- NFL 100th Anniversary All-Time Team (unanimous selection)
- No. 3 on The Top 100: NFL's Greatest Players
- New York Giants Ring of Honor
- The greatest New York Giant of all-time
- New York Giants No. 56 retired
- 100 sacks club
- NFL record for sacks in a single season by a linebacker with 20.5 (1986)
- NFL "unofficial" record for career forced fumbles with 56

College

- 2× ACC champion (1977, 1980)
- 1977 Liberty Bowl champion
- 1979 Gator Bowl champion
- 1980 Astro-Bluebonnet Bowl champion
- 1981 East–West Shrine Bowl champion
- ACC Player of the Year (1980)
- Unanimous All-American (1980)
  - AFCA All-American
  - AP First-team All-American
  - FWAA All-American
  - UPI First-team All-American
  - NEA Second-team All-American
  - Sporting News All-American
- First-team All-ACC (1980)
- UNC Patterson Medal (1981)
- East–West Shrine Bowl All-Century Team
- ACC 50th Anniversary Team
- AP All-Time All-America college football team
- FWAA 1969–1994 All-America Team
- North Carolina Tar Heels Jersey No. 98 honored
- North Carolina record for sacks in a single season with 16 (1980)
- In 2003, Taylor was ranked #7 on the Atlantic Coast Conference's list of Top 10 Male Athletes of All Time

Halls of Fame

- Pro Football Hall of Fame – Class of 1999
- Virginia Sports Hall of Fame – Class of 2003
- New Jersey Hall of Fame – Class of 2026

Media

- ESPN American Athlete of the Year (1986)
- 6× ESPN NFL Pass Rusher of the Year (1981–1986)
- WrestleMania XI Main Event Winner (1995)
- Ranked #5 on the Associated Press' list of Greatest Football Players of the 20th Century (1999)
- Ranked #40 on SportsCentury: Top 50 North American Athletes of the 20th Century (1999)
- Ranked #3 on The Top 100: NFL's Greatest Players (2010)
- Ranked #5 on the New York Daily News list of Top 50 NFL Players of All Time (2014)
- 2× NFL.com's Greatest Defensive Player of All Time (2016, 2022)
- ESPN First Team All-Time All-American (2019)
- ESPN All-Time All-ACC Team (2019)
- Ranked #3 on USA Today's list of the 100 Greatest NFL Players of All Time (2019)
- Ranked #42 on the list of ESPN's Top 150 Greatest College Football Players of All Time (2020)
- Ranked #4 on The Athletic's list of Top 100 NFL Players of All Time (2021)
- ESPN's Greatest NFL Edge Rusher of All Time (2022)
- The 33rd Team's NFL All-Time Defensive Front 7 Team (2023)
- Harold & Carole Pump Foundation – Lifetime Achievement Award (2024)
- Ranked #7 on CBS Sports' list of Top 100 NFL Players of All Time (2026)

== See also ==
- History of the New York Giants (1979–1993)
- List of New York Giants players
- List of NFL career sacks leaders

== Sources ==
- Danyluk, Tom. Super '70s, Chicago: Mad Uke Publishing. 2005 ISBN 0-9770383-0-0
- Eskenazi, Gerald. A Sports-Writer's Life: From the Desk of a New York Times Reporter, Columbia: University of Missouri Press. 2004 ISBN 0-8262-1510-6
- Frostino, Nino. Right on the Numbers, British Columbia: Trafford Publishing. 2004 ISBN 1-4120-3305-5
- Gutman, Bill. Parcells: A Biography, New York: Carroll & Graf Publishers. 2001 ISBN 0-7867-0934-0
- Harris, Othello, Nolte, Claire Elaine, and Kirsch, George B. Encyclopedia of Ethnicity and Sports in the United States, Connecticut: Greenwood Press, 2000 ISBN 0-313-29911-0
- Lupica, Mike. LT, New York, New York Media, LLC December 24–31, 1990 issue, ISSN 0028-7369 (available online)
- Montana, Joe, and Weiner, Richard. Joe Montana's Art and Magic of Quarterbacking: The Secrets of the Game from One of the All-Time Best, Ontario: Owl Books, 1998 ISBN 0-8050-4278-4
- Neft, David S., Cohen, Richard M., and Korch, Rick. The Complete History of Professional Football from 1892 to the Present. New York: St. Martin's Press. 1994 ISBN 0-312-11435-4
- Pervin, Lawrence A. Football's New York Giants: A History. McFarland 2009 ISBN 0-7864-4268-9
- Powell, Adam. University of North Carolina Football, South Carolina: Arcadia Publishing. 2006 ISBN 0-7385-4288-1
- Russo, Christopher, & Allen, St. John. The Mad Dog Hall of Fame: The Ultimate Top-Ten Rankings of the Best in Sports. Broadway 2007 ISBN 0-7679-2372-3
- Schwartz, Paul. Tales from the New York Giants Sideline, Illinois: Sports Publishing LLC. 2004 ISBN 1-58261-758-9
- Shampoe, Clay. The Virginia Sports Hall Of Fame: Honoring Champions Of The Commonwealth, South Carolina: Arcadia Publishing. 2005 ISBN 0-7385-1776-3
- Rand, Jonathan. Riddell Presents the Gridiron's Greatest Linebackers, Illinois: Sports Publishing LLC. 2003 ISBN 1-58261-625-6
- Smith, Ron and Moritz, Carl. The Sporting News Selects Football's 100 Greatest Players: A Celebration of the 20th Century's Best, Missouri: Sporting News Publishing Co. 1999 ISBN 0-89204-624-4
- Sprechman, Jordan and Shannon, Bill. This Day in New York Sports, Illinois: Sports Publishing LLC. 1998 ISBN 1-57167-254-0
- Taylor, Lawrence and Falkner, David. LT: Living on the Edge New York: Random House. 1987 ISBN 0-8129-1703-0
- Taylor, Lawrence and Serby, Steve. LT: Over the Edge Tackling Quarterbacks, Drugs, and a World Beyond Football. New York: HarperCollins. 2003 ISBN 0-06-018551-1
- Taylor, Lawrence. Taylor (Icons of the NFL). New York: Rugged Land. 2006 ISBN 1-59071-082-7
- Walsh, Chris. New York Giants Football: Guide and Record Book. Illinois: Triumph Books 2009 ISBN 1-60078-189-6
- Ziegel, Vic. Giants in the Earth. New York Media, LLC Vol. 16, No. 40 October 10, 1983 ISSN 0028-7369 (available online)
