= 1971 Big Ten Conference football season =

- Sport: American football
- Teams: 10
- Top draft pick: Craig Clemons
- Champion: Michigan
- Runners-up: Northwestern
- Season MVP: Eric Allen

Seasons
- 1970 1972

1971 Big Ten Conference football standings
	Conf.					Overall
Team	W		L		T	W		L		T
No. 6 Michigan $	8	–	0	–	0	11	–	1	–	0
Northwestern	6	–	3	–	0	7	–	4	–	0
Ohio State	5	–	3	–	0	6	–	4	–	0
Michigan State	5	–	3	–	0	6	–	5	–	0
Illinois	5	–	3	–	0	5	–	6	–	0
Wisconsin	3	–	5	–	0	4	–	6	–	1
Minnesota	3	–	5	–	0	4	–	7	–	0
Purdue	3	–	5	–	0	3	–	7	–	0
Indiana	2	–	6	–	0	3	–	8	–	0
Iowa	1	–	8	–	0	1	–	10	–	0
$ – Conference champion; Rankings from AP Poll

The 1971 Big Ten Conference football season was the 76th season of college football played by the member schools of the Big Ten Conference and was a part of the 1971 NCAA University Division football season.

This was the first season in which Big Ten teams were permitted to schedule 11 games, one season after most schools first did so. Ohio State increased its schedule from nine games to 10, but did not play 11 until 1974, while Purdue first scheduled an 11th game in 1972.

The 1971 Michigan Wolverines football team, under head coach Bo Schembechler, compiled an 11–0 record in the regular season but lost to Stanford, 13–12, on a field goal with 12 seconds remaining in the 1972 Rose Bowl. The Wolverines led the Big Ten in both scoring offense (35.1 points per game) and scoring defense (6.9 points allowed per game). The team was ranked No. 4 in the final Coaches Poll and No. 6 in the final AP Poll. Linebacker Mike Taylor and offensive guard Reggie McKenzie were consensus first-team All-Americans. Running back Billy Taylor rushed for 1,297 yards, was named as the team most valuable player, and was selected as a first-team All-American by the Football News. Defensive back Thom Darden was selected as a first-team All-American by the American Football Coaches Association and The Sporting News.

The 1971 Northwestern Wildcats football team, under head coach Alex Agase, compiled a 7–4 record and finished in second place in the Big Ten. Quarterback Maurie Daigneau led the Big Ten with 1,733 passing yards and was a consensus first-team All-Big Ten player. Defensive back Eric Hutchinson was selected as a first-team All-American by the Football Writers Association of America. The Wildcats did not finish in the first division again until winning the conference and going to the Rose Bowl in 1995.

Michigan State running back Eric Allen led the Big Ten with 1,494 rushing yards and 108 points scored and received the Chicago Tribune Silver Football as the conference's most valuable player. Purdue halfback/wide receiver Darryl Stingley led the conference with 734 receiving yards, and Minnesota quarterback Craig Curry led the conference with 2,071 total yards.

Ohio State entered the season knowing its season would end without a bowl. The Buckeyes represented the conference in the Rose Bowl the previous season, and Big Ten teams could not play in a bowl other than the one in Pasadena. This was the last season the Big Ten's "no-repeat" rule was in effect, but the ban on conference teams playing in other bowls was not lifted until 1975.

== Season overview ==
=== Results and team statistics ===
Conf. Rank	Team	Head coach	AP final	AP high	Overall record	Conf. record	PPG	PAG	MVP
1	Michigan	Bo Schembechler	#6	#2	11–1	8–0	**35.1**	**6.9**	Billy Taylor
2	Northwestern	Alex Agase	NR	#19	7–4	6–3	19.2	16.6	John Voorhees
3 (tie)	Ohio State	Woody Hayes	NR	#5	6–4	5–3	22.4	12.0	Tom DeLeone
3 (tie)	Michigan State	Duffy Daugherty	NR	#18	6–5	5–3	20.5	15.4	**Eric Allen**
3 (tie)	Illinois	Bob Blackman	NR	NR	5–6	5–3	14.8	21.6	Terry Masar
6 (tie)	Wisconsin	John Jardine	NR	NR	4–6–1	3–5	21.8	23.5	Neil Graff
6 (tie)	Minnesota	Murray Warmath	NR	NR	4–7	3–5	19.3	25.3	Tom Chandler
6 (tie)	Purdue	Bob DeMoss	NR	#17	3–7	3–5	21.0	22.8	Tom Luken
9	Indiana	John Pont	NR	NR	3–8	2–6	13.8	23.6	Chuck Thomson
10	Iowa	Frank Lauterbur	NR	NR	1–10	1–8	11.0	34.5	Craig Clemons

Key
AP final = Team's rank in the final AP Poll of the 1971 season
AP high = Team's highest rank in the AP Poll throughout the 1971 season
PPG = Average of points scored per game; conference leader's average displayed in bold
PAG = Average of points allowed per game; conference leader's average displayed in bold
MVP = Most valuable player as voted by players on each team as part of the voting process to determine the winner of the Chicago Tribune Silver Football trophy; trophy winner in bold

=== Regular season ===
==== September 11 ====
On September 11, 1971, the Big Ten football teams opened the season with four conference games and one non-conference game. Purdue did not open its season until the following week.

- Michigan 21, Northwestern 6. Michigan (ranked No. 4 in the AP Poll) opened its 1971 season with a 21–6 victory over Northwestern (ranked No. 20 in the AP Poll) in front of 42,472 spectators at Dyche Stadium in Evanston, Illinois. Split end Bo Rather scored two touchdowns, and tailback Billy Taylor scored Michigan's third touchdown on a five-yard run. Taylor totaled 105 rushing yards on 28 carries in the game. On defense, Frank Gusich had two interceptions. Northwestern scored its touchdown in the fourth quarter on a short pass. After the game, coach Schembechler told the press, "It was no masterpiece, but it was effective."
- Ohio State 52, Iowa 21. Ohio State (ranked No. 11 in the AP Poll) defeated Iowa, 52–21, before a crowd of 75,596 at Ohio Stadium in Columbus, Ohio.
- Michigan State 10, Illinois 0.
- Minnesota 28, Indiana 0.
- Wisconsin 31, Northern Illinois 0.

==== September 18 ====
On September 18, 1971, the Big Ten teams participated in nine non-conference games, resulting in three wins and six losses. Ohio State had a bye week.

- Michigan 56, Virginia 0. Michigan (ranked No. 4 in the AP Poll) defeated Virginia, 56–0, in its home opener before a crowd of 81,391 at Michigan Stadium. Michigan took a 35–0 lead at halftime and used its reserves extensively, including five quarterbacks and 11 running backs. Michigan's offense was heavily skewed in favor of the ground game, with 83 rushing carries and only 10 passes. The Wolverine backs totaled 495 rushing yards, including 107 yards by Ed Shuttlesworth. Virginia completed only one pass and threw three interceptions. In total offense, Michigan out-gained Virginia, 566 yards to 78 yards. After the game, Virginia coach Don Lawrence praised Michigan's running backs: "Those are the best six running backs I've ever seen together. We were there, but we just got knocked down." Coach Schembechler opined, "There's not much to say, is there? We were bigger and stronger physically than they were."
- Notre Dame 50, Northwestern 7.
- Georgia Tech 10, Michigan State 0.
- North Carolina 27, Illinois 0.
- Wisconsin 20, Syracuse 20.
- Nebraska 35, Minnesota 7.
- Washington 38, Purdue 35.
- Indiana 26, Kentucky 8.
- Oregon State 33, Iowa 19.

==== September 25 ====
On September 25, 1971, the Big Ten teams played 10 non-conference games, resulting in three wins and seven losses. Through the first three weeks of the season, the Big Ten had compiled a 7–13 record against non-conference opponents.

- Michigan 38, UCLA 0. Michigan (ranked No. 4 in the AP Poll) defeated UCLA, 38–0, before a crowd of 89,177 in the rain at Michigan Stadium. Michigan led 24–0 at halftime. In the fourth quarter, Michigan added two more touchdowns, including a 92-yard interception return by Thom Darden. With 91 rushing yards, Billy Taylor passed 2,000 career rushing yards to move into third place among Michigan's career rushing leaders. On defense, Michigan held UCLA to 39 rushing yards and sacked UCLA quarterback nine times. After the game, UCLA coach Pepper Rodgers said, "I've never had a team dominated the way we were today." After defeating UCLA, Michigan jumped to No. 2 in the AP and UPI polls.
- Northwestern 12, Syracuse 6.
- Colorado 20, Ohio State 14. Ohio State (ranked No. 6 in the AP Poll) lost to Colorado (ranked No. 10), 20–14, before a crowd of 85,586 at Ohio Stadium in Columbus, Ohio.
- Michigan State 31, Oregon State 14.
- USC 28, Illinois 0.
- LSU 38, Wisconsin 28. The #18 Bayou Bengals, the reigning Southeastern Conference champions, played a Big Ten opponent for the first time in front of a Camp Randall Stadium record crowd of 78,535 .
- Washington State 31, Minnesota 20.
- Notre Dame 8, Purdue 7.
- Baylor 10, Indiana 0.
- Penn State 44, Iowa 14.

==== October 2 ====
On October 2, 1971, the Big Ten teams played two conference games and six non-conference games. The non-conference games resulted in three wins and three losses, giving the Big Ten a 10–16 non-conference record to that point in the season.

- Northwestern 24, Wisconsin 11.
- Purdue 45, Iowa 13.
- Michigan 46, Navy 0. Michigan (ranked No. 2 in the AP Poll) defeated Navy, 46–0, in front of 68,168 spectators in Michigan Stadium. The game marked the first time since 1948 that a Michigan football team had shut out three consecutive opponents. Michigan's running backs scored five rushing touchdowns. With 76 rushing yards, Billy Taylor passed Tom Harmon and moved into second place among Michigan's career rushing leaders. Michigan out-gained Navy by 428 yards to 71 yards. During a halftime ceremony, Michigan honored the crew of Apollo 15, James Irwin, David Scott, and Alfred Worden, all Michigan alumni.
- Ohio State 35, California 3.
- Notre Dame 14, Michigan State 2.
- Washington 52, Illinois 14.
- Minnesota 38, Kansas 20.
- Syracuse 7, Indiana 0.

==== October 9 ====
On October 9, 1971, the Big Ten teams played five conference games.

- Michigan 24, Michigan State 13. Michigan (ranked No. 2 in the AP Poll) won its fifth consecutive game, defeating Michigan State, 24–13, in front of 80,093 spectators, the largest crowd to that time in the history of Spartan Stadium in East Lansing, Michigan. Billy Taylor rushed for 117 yards and two touchdowns on 15 carries. Tom Slade started his first game at quarterback, completed three of nine passes for 45 yards, and rushed for 48 yards and a touchdown. With Michigan State athletic director Biggie Munn in critical condition following a stroke, the Spartans kept the game close until late in the game. In the weekly polling after the game, the Wolverines dropped from No. 2 to No. 3 in both the Coaches and AP Polls.
- Northwestern 28, Iowa 3.
- Ohio State 24, Illinois 10.
- Wisconsin 35, Indiana 29.
- Purdue 27, Minnesota 13.

==== October 16 ====
On October 16, 1971, the Big Ten teams played five conference games.

- Michigan 35, Illinois 6. Michigan (ranked No. 3 in the AP Poll) defeated Illinois, 35–6, at Michigan Stadium. Quarterback Tom Slade threw an interception on the first play from scrimmage, setting up an Illinois touchdown only one minute and 23 seconds into the game. Slade then settled in, ran 25 yards for Michigan's first touchdown, and completed five of seven passes for 74 yards and a touchdown. Defensive back Thom Darden set up Michigan's second touchdown with a 47-yard punt return. Wingback Glenn Doughty was the star of the game for Michigan, as he rushed for 48 yards and two touchdowns on six carries and caught three passes for 56 yards and a touchdown. Billy Taylor led the rushing attack with 103 yards and a touchdown on 22 carries.
- Purdue 21, Northwestern 20.
- Ohio State 27, Indiana 7.
- Wisconsin 31, Michigan State 28.
- Minnesota 19, Iowa 14.

==== October 23 ====
On October 23, 1971, the Big Ten teams played five conference games.

- Michigan 35, Minnesota 7. In the annual Little Brown Jug game, Michigan (ranked No. 3 in the AP Poll) defeated Minnesota, 35–7, in front of 44,176 spectators in Minneapolis. Billy Taylor rushed for 166 and two touchdowns on 33 carries. He also surpassed Ron Johnson's career total of 2,524 rushing yards to become Michigan's all-time career rushing leader. Michigan rushed for 391 yards in all.
- Northwestern 24, Indiana 10.
- Ohio State 31, Wisconsin 6.
- Michigan State 34, Iowa 3.
- Illinois 21, Purdue 7.

==== October 30 ====
On October 30, 1971, the Big Ten teams played five conference games.

- Michigan 61, Indiana 7. Michigan (ranked No. 3 in the AP Poll) defeated Indiana, 61–7, before a crowd of 75,751 at Michigan Stadium. Michigan's 61 points was its highest score since a 69-point tally in 1947. Billy Taylor led the offense with 172 rushing yards, including touchdown runs of 43 and 66 yards, on 11 carries, an average of 15.6 yards per carry. Michigan rushed for a total of 452 yards. Thom Darden returned an interception 60 yards for a touchdown. Michigan also recovered four fumbles and played its reserves extensively, with a total of 68 players seeing game action. After the game, coach Bo Schembechler sent his regrets to his close friend and Indiana coach John Pont; Schembechler told the press, "I hate to beat anybody that bad, especially somebody I like."
- Illinois 24, Northwestern 7.
- Ohio State 14, Minnesota 12.
- Michigan State 43, Purdue 10.
- Iowa 20, Wisconsin 16.

==== November 6 ====
On November 6, 1971, the Big Ten teams played five conference games.

- Michigan 63, Iowa 7. Michigan (ranked No. 3 in the AP Poll) defeated Iowa, 63–7, in front of 72,467 "shivering fans" at Michigan Stadium. Fullback Ed Shuttlesworth rushed for three touchdowns in the first half to give Michigan a 21–0 lead at halftime. Shuttlesworth ended up with 112 yards on 16 carries. Michigan's backs totaled 493 rushing yards. Dana Coin kicked seven extra points, giving him an NCAA record with 51 consecutive successful extra point kicks.
- Northwestern 41, Minnesota 20.
- Michigan State 17, Ohio State 10.
- Illinois 22, Indiana 21.
- Wisconsin 14, Purdue 10.

==== November 13 ====
On November 13, 1971, the Big Ten teams played five conference games.

- Michigan 20, Purdue 17. Michigan (ranked No. 3 in the AP Poll) defeated Purdue, 20–17. For the second consecutive week, Ed Shuttlesworth led Michigan in rushing, totaling 125 yards and a touchdown on 28 carries. Dana Coin added two field goals, including the winning field goal with 46 seconds left in the game. Purdue quarterback Gary Danielson, who attended high school in Dearborn, Michigan, kept the game close with touchdown passes of nine and 66 yards.
- Northwestern 14, Ohio State 10. Northwestern defeated Ohio State, 14–10, before a crowd of 86,062 at Ohio Stadium in Columbus, Ohio. Ohio State took a 7–0 lead in the first quarter, but Greg Strunk returned the ensuing kickoff 93 yards for a tying touchdown. Fullback Randy Anderson scored the winning touchdown in the fourth quarter.
- Michigan State 40, Minnesota 25. Michigan State defeated Minnesota, 40–25, before a crowd of 61,419 at Spartan Stadium in East Lansing, Michigan. Eric Allen scored touchdowns on the Spartans' first three possessions. Allen ended with 179 rushing yards and four touchdowns on 34 carries.
- Illinois 35, Wisconsin 27. Illinois defeated Wisconsin, 35–27, before a crowd of 65,459 at Camp Randall Stadium in Madison, Wisconsin. The highlight of the game was a 73-yard touchdown run by Illinois' John Wilson. Illinois backs John Wilson and George Uremovich rushed for 210 and 116 yards, respectively.
- Indiana 14, Iowa 7. Indiana defeated Iowa, 14–7, before a crowd of 42,102 at Iowa Stadium in Iowa City. The game was played on Indiana head coach John Pont's 44th birthday. Quarterback Ted McNulty connected with split end Alan Dick for an 80-yard touchdown pass and catch.

==== November 20 ====
On November 20, 1971, the Big Ten teams played five conference games.

- Michigan 10, Ohio State 7. Michigan (ranked No. 3 in the AP Poll) defeated Ohio State, 10–7, before an NCAA record crowd of 104,016 persons in attendance at Michigan Stadium. Michigan took a 3–0 lead at halftime on a 32-yard field goal by Dana Coin. Ohio State took the lead in the third quarter on an 85-yard punt return by Campana. Billy Taylor, assisted by a "devastating block" by Fritz Seyferth, put Michigan back in the lead with a 21-yard touchdown run with two minutes and seven seconds left in the game. Ohio State's final drive ended when Thom Darden intercepted a pass with one-and-a-half minutes remaining. After the interception, Ohio State coach Woody Hayes ran across the field, berating each of the officials. Referee Jerry Markbreit assessed an unsportsman-ike conduct against Hayes. Another penalty was assessed against an Ohio State's Randy Gradishar for punching Michigan's backup quarterback, Larry Cipa. When the officials moved the first-down markers to assess the penalty, Hayes pulled the markers from ground, threw one onto the field and threw the other to the ground, proceeding to then rip the plastic flag from the pole with his hand. The victory gave Michigan an undefeated record in the regular season for the first time since 1948.
- Northwestern 28, Michigan State 7. Northwestern defeated Michigan State, 28–7, before a crowd of 30,012 at Dyche Stadium in Evanston, Illinois. Halfback Randy Anderson scored three touchdowns for Northwestern, and Derling returned an interception 16 yards for Northwestern's final touchdown. The victory sealed a second-place finish in the Big Ten for the Wildcats, their last first division finish until their 1995 conference championship.
- Illinois 31, Iowa 0. Illinois defeated Iowa, 31–0, before a crowd of 40,703 at Memorial Stadium in Champaign, Illinois. Illinois gained 514 yards of total offense to 92 for Iowa. Iowa finished with a 1–10 record that was the worst in program history. The 382 points allowed was also the worst in Iowa football history.
- Minnesota 23, Wisconsin 21. In the annual Minnesota–Wisconsin football rivalry game, Minnesota defeated Wisconsin, 23–21, before a crowd of 34,738 at Memorial Stadium in Minneapolis. The game was Murray Warmath's last in 18 years as Minnesota's head football coach. Minnesota trailed, 21–16, late in the fourth quarter when the Golden Gophers drove 80 yards and scored on a 12-yard touchdown pass from Craig Curry to Mel Anderson with nine seconds remaining in the game.
- Indiana 38, Purdue 31. In the annual battle for the Old Oaken Bucket, Indiana defeated Purdue, 38–31, before a crowd of 50,978 at Seventeenth Street Stadium in Bloomington, Indiana. The Hoosiers scored early when Rob Spicer returned an interception for a touchdown on the opening drive. Late in the game, a brawl broke out after Purdue quarterback Gary Danielson was chased out of bounds. Danielson completed 14 of 25 passes for 264 yards, two touchdowns and two interceptions. Indiana fullback Ken St. Pierre rushed for 142 yards.

=== Bowl games ===
The game was the first Rose Bowl meeting between the two schools since the inaugural Rose Bowl in 1902, in which Michigan crushed Stanford, 49–0. In the 1972 rematch, Michigan was ranked #3 in the country and favored by 10½ points. Michigan's Dana Coin kicked a 30-yard field goal in the second quarter for the only first half scoring. In the first series of the second half, Stanford stopped the Wolverines on fourth and one at Stanford's four-yard line, then tied the game on a 42-yard field goal by Rod Garcia. Early in the fourth quarter, Michigan's Fritz Seyferth scored on a one-yard dive to put Michigan up 10–3. After Stanford got the ball back, the Indians faced fourth and ten from their own 33. Stanford ran a fake punt, with Jim Kehl receiving the snap and handing the ball forward to Jackie Brown through Brown's legs. Brown ran 33 yards for a first down, and followed up a minute later with a 24-yard touchdown run to tie the game. Late in the fourth quarter, Michigan recovered a Stanford fumble near midfield. Facing fourth down with time running down, the Wolverines attempted a 42-yard field goal. The kick was short, and Stanford safety Jim Ferguson caught the ball and attempted to run it out of the end zone. Instead, he was knocked back into the end zone by Ed Shuttlesworth for a controversial Michigan safety, as replays seemed to show that Ferguson's forward progress was to the three-yard line. This made the score 12–10 with just over three minutes to play, and Michigan due to get the ball on a free kick. Following the free kick, Stanford held Michigan to a three-and-out and got the ball back on their own 22-yard line with 1:48 to go. Bunce then threw five consecutive completions to take Stanford to the Michigan 17-yard line with 22 seconds left. The Indians ran twice to get to the Michigan 14-yard line with 12 seconds left. From there, Garcia kicked a 31-yard field goal to give Stanford a 13–12 victory.

== Statistical leaders ==
=== Passing yards ===
1. Maurie Daigneau, Northwestern (1,733)
2. Craig Curry, Minnesota (1,691)
3. Gary Danielson, Purdue (1,467)
4. Neil Graff, Wisconsin (1,300)
5. Frank Sunderman, Iowa (1,297)

=== Rushing yards ===
1. Eric Allen, Michigan State (1,494)
2. Billy Taylor, Michigan (1,297)
3. Rufus Ferguson, Wisconsin (1,222)
4. Otis Armstrong, Purdue (945)
5. Al Robinson, Northwestern (881)
5. Ernie Cook, Minnesota (881)

=== Receiving yards ===
1. Darryl Stingley, Purdue (734)
2. Barry Pearson, Northwestern (674)
3. Albert Hannah, Wisconsin (608)
4. Rick Sayers, Purdue (573)
5. Jim Lash, Northwestern (523)

=== Total yards ===
1. Craig Curry, Minnesota (2,071)
2. Maurie Daigneau, Northwestern (1,678)
3. Gary Danielson, Purdue (1,494)
3. Eric Allen, Michigan State (1,494)
5. Neil Graff, Wisconsin (1,486)

=== Scoring ===
1. Eric Allen, Michigan State (108)
2. Billy Taylor, Michigan (78)
2. Rufus Ferguson, Wisconsin (78)
4. Randy Anderson, Northwestern (60)
4. Otis Armstrong, Purdue (60)

== Awards and honors ==
=== All-Big Ten honors ===
The following players were picked by the Associated Press (AP) and/or the United Press International (UPI) as first-team players on the 1971 All-Big Ten Conference football team.

Offense

Position	Name	Team	Selectors
Quarterback	Maurie Daigneau	Northwestern	AP, UPI
Running back	Eric Allen	Michigan State	AP, UPI
Running back	Rufus Ferguson	Wisconsin	AP, UPI
Running back	Billy Taylor	Michigan	AP, UPI
Offensive end	Doug Kingsriter	Illinois	AP, UPI [tight end]
Offensive end	Barry Pearson	Northwestern	AP, UPI [wide receiver]
Offensive tackle	Tom Luken	Purdue	AP, UPI
Offensive tackle	Tom McCreight	Northwestern	AP
Offensive tackle	Rick Simon	Ohio State	UPI
Offensive guard	Joe DeLamielleure	Michigan State	AP, UPI
Offensive guard	Reggie McKenzie	Michigan	AP, UPI
Center	Tom DeLeone	Ohio State	AP, UPI

Defense

Position	Name	Team	Selectors
Defensive end	Tab Bennett	Illinois	AP, UPI
Defensive end	Mike Keller	Michigan	AP
Defensive end	Gary Hrivnak	Purdue	UPI
Defensive tackle	Ron Curl	Michigan State	AP, UPI
Defensive tackle	George Hasenhorhl	Ohio State	AP, UPI
Defensive guard	Greg Bingham	Purdue	UPI
Linebacker	Mike Taylor	Michigan	AP, UPI
Linebacker	Bill Light	Minnesota	AP
Linebacker	Stan White	Ohio State	AP
Linebacker	Randy Gradishar	Ohio State	UPI
Defensive back	Thom Darden	Michigan	AP, UPI
Defensive back	Eric Hutchinson	Northwestern	AP, UPI
Defensive back	Brad Van Pelt	Michigan State	AP, UPI
Defensive back	Craig Clemons	Iowa	UPI

=== All-American honors ===
At the end of the 1971 season, Big Ten players secured two of the consensus first-team picks for the 1971 College Football All-America Team. The Big Ten's consensus All-Americans were:

Position	Name	Team	Selectors
Linebacker	Mike Taylor	Michigan	AFCA, AP, FWAA, NEA, UPI, FN, Time, TSN, WCFF
Offensive guard	Reggie McKenzie	Michigan	AP, FWAA, NEA, UPI, FN, Time, TSN, WCFF

Other Big Ten players who were named first-team All-Americans by at least one selector were:

Position	Name	Team	Selectors
Tight end	Doug Kingsriter	Minnesota	AP
Center	Tom DeLeone	Ohio State	NEA, UPI, FN, Time, TSN
Running back	Eric Allen	Michigan State	AFCA
Running back	Billy Taylor	Michigan	FN
Middle guard	Ron Curl	Michigan State	AFCA
Defensive back	Brad Van Pelt	Michigan State	UPI, FN
Defensive back	Thom Darden	Michigan	AFCA, TSN
Defensive back	Eric Hutchinson	Northwestern	FWAA
Defensive back	Craig Clemons	Iowa	NEA, TSN)

=== Other awards ===
Running back Eric Allen of Michigan State finished 10th in the voting for the 1971 Heisman Trophy.

== 1972 NFL draft ==
The following Big Ten players were among the first 100 picks in the 1972 NFL draft:

Name	Position	Team	Round	Overall pick
Craig Clemons	Safety	Iowa	1	12
Thom Darden	Cornerback	Michigan	1	18
Mike Taylor	Linebacker	Michigan	1	20
Reggie McKenzie	Guard	Michigan	2	27
Glenn Doughty	Wide receiver	Michigan	2	47
Tom Beckman	Defensive end	Michigan	3	57
Bart Buetow	Tackle	Minnesota	3	59
Mike Keller	Linebacker	Michigan	3	64
Tom Luken	Guard	Purdue	3	68
