= John Shinners =

American football player (1947–2022)

No. 67, 64
- Position: Guard

Personal information
- Born: March 1, 1947; Hartford, Wisconsin, U.S.
- Died: October 2, 2022 (aged 75); Green Bay, Wisconsin, U.S.
- Listed height: 6 ft 3 in (1.91 m)
- Listed weight: 255 lb (116 kg)

Career information
- High school: Campion Prep (Prairie du Chien, Wisconsin)
- College: Xavier (OH) (1965-1968)
- NFL draft: 1969: 1st round, 17th overall pick

Career history
- New Orleans Saints (1969–1971); Baltimore Colts (1972); Cincinnati Bengals (1973–1977)

Awards and highlights
- First-team All-American (1968); Xavier University Athletic Hall of Fame

Career NFL statistics
- Games Played: 97
- Games Started: 36
- Fumble recoveries: 3
- Stats at Pro Football Reference

John Joseph Shinners (March 1, 1947 – October 2, 2022) was an American professional football offensive lineman in the NFL for the New Orleans Saints, Baltimore Colts, and Cincinnati Bengals.

== Early career ==
Shinners grew up in Hartford, Wisconsin, one of five children (and the only son) of John, a newspaper publisher and owner, and Leocadia Shinners.

Shinners played college football at Xavier University in Cincinnati, Ohio. Standing 6 feet 3 inches (1.91 m) and weighing 245 pounds (111 kg), the offensive guard earned All-America honors from The Sporting News as a senior in 1968, becoming Xavier's first and only football All-American. He earned a degree in liberal arts.

As a Musketeer, Shinners and his teammates compiled a 25–14–1 record (.638) in four seasons: 8–2 in 1965, 5–5 in 1966, 6–3–1 in 1967 and 6–4 in 1968. Xavier took three of four victories from local rival University of Cincinnati during the four-year stretch.

== Professional career ==
Shinners was selected in the first round (17th overall) of the 1969 AFL-NFL Common Draft by the New Orleans Saints, where he spent three seasons. He played only two games in his rookie year, then nine in 1970 (four of which he was a starter), and finally in 1971 he saw action in all 14 Saints games.

Shinners was the second Xavier product to play for the Saints alongside former Musketeers teammate Danny Abramowicz.

After the Saints drafted Georgia guard Royce Smith in the first round of the 1972 draft, Shinners was traded to the Baltimore Colts for defensive back Jim Duncan, a 1972 fifth-round selection (126th overall–South Carolina defensive back Bo Davies) and a 1973 sixth-round pick (139th overall–Doug Kingsriter). His time with the Colts lasted nine months when he was traded to the Bengals for a 1973 fourth-round draft pick on October 24.

It was for the Bengals that he came into his own. In 1973, he played in all 14 games, and by 1974 he was a starter, starting 10 of 13 games he played.

In 1975, he again played in all 14 games, starting four.

Shinners was again a full-time starter in 1976, starting all 13 games he played. His final year was 1977, when he started five of his 12 games played.

Shinners was with the Bengals through his final season as a pro, 1977. He played 97 games during his nine-year NFL career. He was the last Xavier player active in the NFL; Abramowicz retired after playing for the San Francisco 49ers for most of 1973 and all of 1974.

== After football ==
Shinners followed in the footsteps of his father, a former minor league baseball player who founded the Hartford Times-Press in 1933. In 1954, his father became the co-owner of the Menomonee Falls News in Wisconsin, and in 1969 he bought several weekly newspapers in the Milwaukee area. His father died in 1982 at age 74.

John Shinners eventually became president of Shinners Publications before selling the company in 1997. He lived in Sturgeon Bay, Wisconsin. He worked as a business consultant and did work with a local radio station.

In 1996, he was inducted into the Xavier University Athletic Hall of Fame, and he was a member of the university's Legion of Honor. Shinners' youngest daughter, Rebecca, graduated from Xavier in 1997. Shinners died in Green Bay, Wisconsin, on October 2, 2022, at the age of 75.
