= Jim Duncan (cornerback) =

American football player (1946–1972)

No. 35
- Position: Cornerback

Personal information
- Born: August 3, 1946; Lancaster, South Carolina, U.S.
- Died: October 20, 1972 (aged 26); Lancaster, South Carolina, U.S.
- Listed height: 6 ft 2 in (1.88 m)
- Listed weight: 200 lb (91 kg)

Career information
- High school: Reidsville (Reidsville, North Carolina)
- College: MD-Eastern Shore
- NFL draft: 1968: 4th round, 107th overall pick

Career history
- Baltimore Colts (1969–1971); New Orleans Saints (1972)

Awards and highlights
- Super Bowl champion (V)

Career NFL statistics
- Interceptions: 2
- Fumble recoveries: 1
- Kick/punt return yards: 1,369
- Total touchdowns: 2
- Stats at Pro Football Reference

Jim 'Butch' Duncan (August 3, 1946 – October 21, 1972) was an American professional football defensive back. He played for the Baltimore Colts and New Orleans Saints between 1969 and 1972. He started in Super Bowl V for the Colts. He was found to have died by suicide with a policeman's revolver in 1972.

== Early life ==
Duncan was born in Lancaster, South Carolina in 1946. He grew up with future professional football player Bill Belk. Duncan attended Barr Street High School in Lancaster. Duncan attended Maryland State College (MSC). He played quarterback and safety at MSC, in addition to playing on the school's baseball and basketball teams. He earned all-conference honors in football in 1967 and appeared in the 1968 Chicago College All-Star Game.

== Professional career ==
Duncan was selected by the Colts in the fourth round of the 1968 NFL/AFL draft. He spent 1968 on the taxi squad before making the active roster in 1969. In his rookie season, Duncan returned 19 kickoffs for 560 yards and a touchdown, leading the NFL with an average of 29.5 yards per return.

In 1970 under new coach Don McCafferty, Duncan won a starting position during the season and he intercepted two passes in the team's last four games. On special teams that year, he averaged a league-leading 35.4 yards per return on 20 kick returns. He was a starter for the Colts in their Super Bowl V victory that year. Duncan returned 4 kickoffs for 90 yards in the game (with one fumble), and recovered a fumble on defense.

In 1971, Duncan began the season with a starting position, but he experienced injury problems for much of the year. During a November game vs. the Oakland Raiders, he sustained a head injury. Though X-rays were negative, his mother later said that he began to complain of memory problems after the injury. During that season, team officials began to notice a change in Duncan's personality. His affable disposition had turned sullen and Colts owner Carroll Rosenbloom was concerned enough to hold some private conversations with Duncan about whether he was having personal problems.

Duncan was traded along with a 1972 fifth-round selection (126th overall–South Carolina defensive back Bo Davies) and a 1973 sixth-round pick (139th overall–Doug Kingsriter) from the Colts to the New Orleans Saints for John Shinners on January 29, 1972. He was cut during the exhibition season. He joined the Miami Dolphins, coached by Don Shula, who drafted Duncan in Baltimore, later that season, but he was cut from the team. His marriage ended, he lost between $22,000 and $58,000 in a wig business, and he received treatment for mental health problems and a bleeding ulcer. Police officers said that he was under surveillance for drug-related activities.

Duncan's career yards per kickoff return average was 32.6, which ranked as the highest in NFL history. However, his 42 kickoff returns were not enough to qualify him above the league minimum (75 returns) for the official record.

== Death ==
On October 20, 1972, Duncan walked into a police station in his hometown of Lancaster. Police officials said that he grabbed a pistol from one of the officers and shot himself in the head. An inquest later supported this account of Duncan's death, but the ruling angered his family members, who cited inconsistencies in some of the events surrounding Duncan's death.

== See also ==
- List of gridiron football players who died during their careers
