= Thom Darden =

American football player (born 1950)

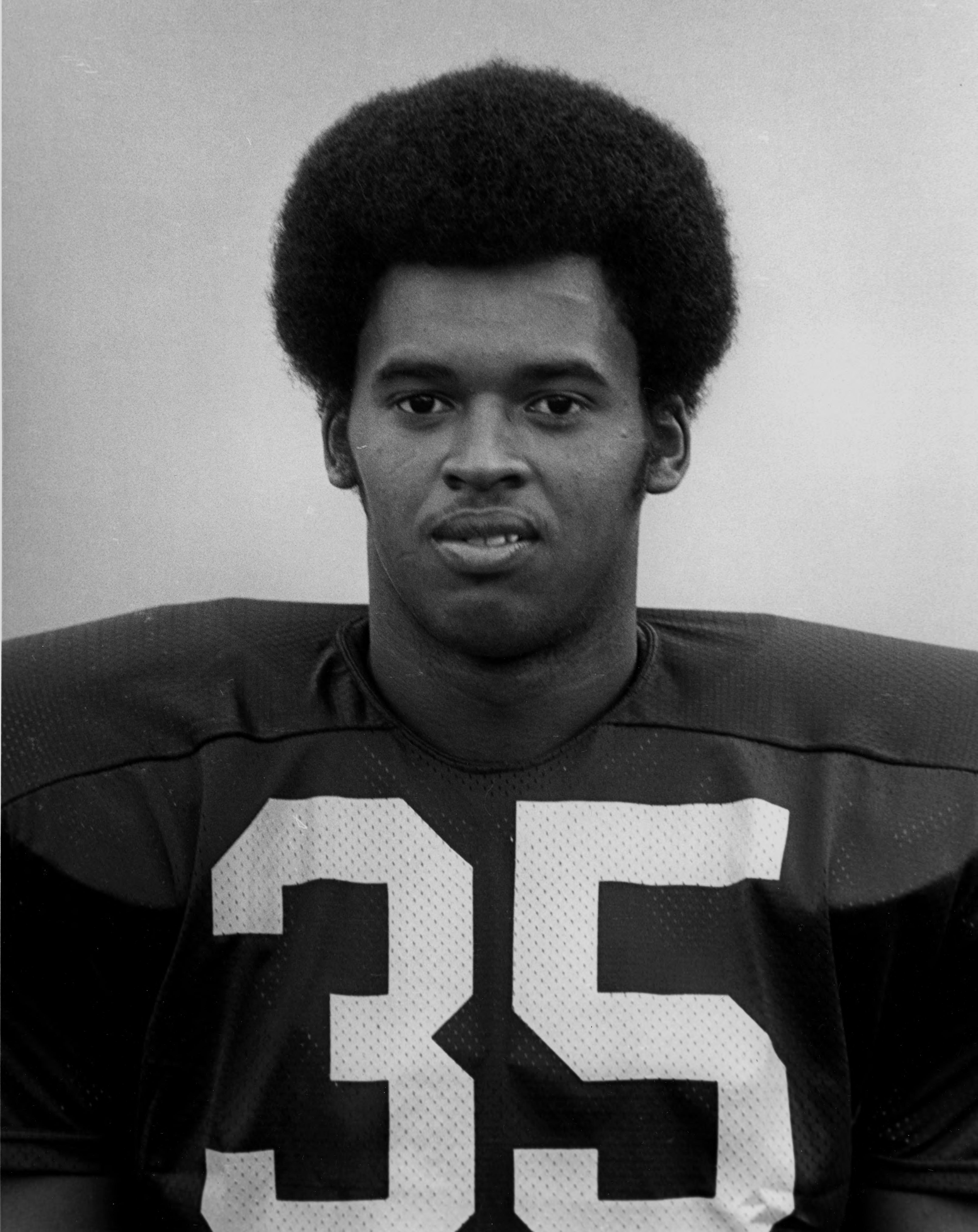
- Darden in 1971

No. 27
- Position: Safety

Personal information
- Born: August 28, 1950 (age 76); Sandusky, Ohio, U.S.
- Listed height: 6 ft 2 in (1.88 m)
- Listed weight: 195 lb (88 kg)

Career information
- High school: Sandusky (OH)
- College: Michigan
- NFL draft: 1972: 1st round, 18th overall pick

Career history
- Cleveland Browns (1972–1981)

Awards and highlights
- 3× Second-team All-Pro (1976, 1978, 1979); Pro Bowl (1978); NFL interceptions leader (1978); First-team All-American (1971); 2× First-team All-Big Ten (1970, 1971)

Career NFL statistics
- Interceptions: 45
- Interception yards: 820
- Touchdowns: 2
- Stats at Pro Football Reference

Thomas Vincent Darden (born August 28, 1950) is an American former professional football player who was a safety and punt returner for the Cleveland Browns of the National Football League (NFL). The Ohio native is memorable for important plays in both the Michigan–Ohio State football rivalry and the Bengals–Browns rivalry.

In nine NFL seasons, he was a three-time All-Pro free safety. He earned a Pro Bowl selection in 1978. He holds most Cleveland Browns franchise interception records. He was an All-American defensive back playing college football for the Michigan Wolverines, and made one of the more memorable interceptions in college history. After retiring from football, Darden pursued careers as a sports agent, security provider and business consultant.

== Early life ==
Darden was born in Sandusky, Ohio. He graduated from Sandusky High School.

== College football ==
After graduating, he was recruited by six Big Ten football programs in 1968, including Michigan and Ohio State. (Darden lost interest in Ohio State when he saw Coach Woody Hayes erase Darden's name from the bottom of a recruiting list and place it at the top, implausibly claiming Darden was his top recruit.) He played at the University of Michigan from 1969 to 1971 and had 218 tackles and 11 interceptions. He was an All American in 1971, and he was also named All-Big Ten in 1970. He played on Big Ten champions in both 1969 and 1971. Thom fit in well at Michigan, becoming one of Coach Bo Schembechler's prized pupils and earning a reference in his 2006 book Bo Schembechler. Darden still ranks among leaders at Michigan for Punt Returns and Punt Return Yardage. Darden played all defensive back positions at Michigan. In college, Darden was a housemate of Reggie McKenzie, Glenn Doughty, Billy Taylor and Mike Taylor in a notable house known as the Den of the Mellow Men.

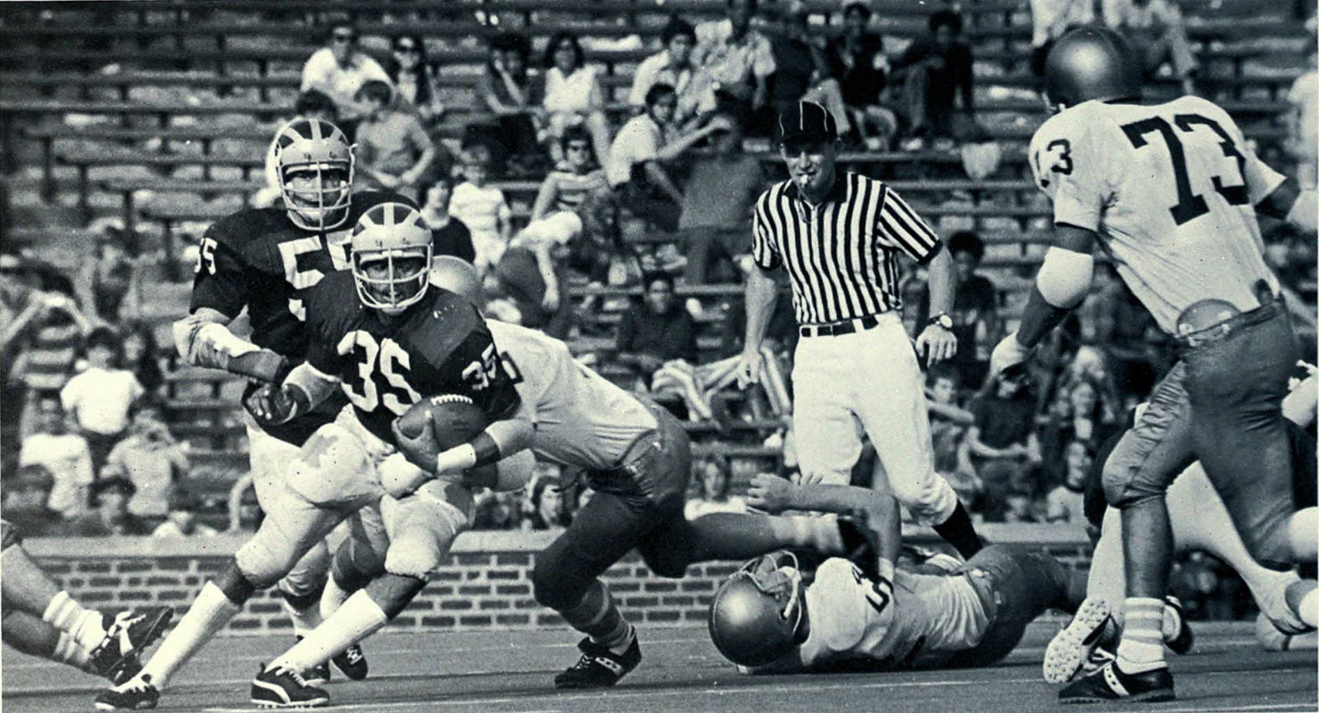
Darden (No. 35) from 1972 ''Michiganensian''

ESPN chose Darden's November 21, 1971 interception in the rivalry game against Ohio State as one of the 100 Plays, performances and moments that define college football. The play was a very controversial call late in the 10–7 game and Ohio State coach Woody Hayes stormed the field to rant at the referee Jerry Markbreit about the referee's call that Hayes thought should have been ruled pass interference. By the end of Hayes' tirade, he had broken a yard marker, shredded a first-down indicator and earned two 15-yard unsportsmanlike penalties. The scene was replayed over and over on national television broadcasts. That was Darden's second interception in that game. ESPN also chose Darden as a member of the All-Time University of Michigan Football team.

== Professional football ==
Darden was drafted in the first round (18th overall) in the 1972 NFL draft by the Cleveland Browns. Darden started at strong safety in his rookie season of 1972 and played the remainder of his career at free safety until he retired after his tenth and final season, where he only started 10 games. Autry Beamon and Lawrence Johnson filled in for the injured Darden in his final season (1981). Clinton Burrell, who won a starting cornerback position in 1980, only played 2 games in 1981. Rookie Hanford Dixon started at cornerback in place of the injured Burrell. After Darden's retirement, the Browns moved Clinton Burrell to strong safety and Clarence Scott to free safety. Darden was selected as an All-Pro safety in 1976, 1978, and 1979, and went to the Pro Bowl in 1978.

According to Dave Logan, Darden and head coach Forrest Gregg once had a fist fight after a game. Darden has explained that the 1977 Cleveland Browns did not respond to Gregg's coaching style, which contributed to his firing with one game remaining.

When Cleveland played its season finale against the 1980 Bengals and their former head coach Gregg in the annual rivalry game, Darden used a violent forearm to the face of Pat McInally. McInally was unconscious for about 10 minutes and left the field on a stretcher, but he returned in the second half to make a game-tying touchdown. Art McNally, NFL Supervisor of Officials reviewed game film and ruled that the hit was "unnecessarily rough" resulting in NFL Commissioner Pete Rozelle levying a $1000 ($3541 in 2025) fine on Darden. The hit and McInally's recovery are a legendary part of the intrastate rivalry.

Over the course of his career he handled 45 punt returns for 285 return yards. Darden holds Cleveland Browns franchise records with 45 career interceptions, 10 single-season interceptions and 820 interception return yards. Two of Darden's Browns teams went to the playoffs. His rookie year, the 10–4 1972 Browns went to the 1972-73 NFL playoffs under head coach Nick Skorich, but lost in the first round to the Miami Dolphins 20–14. The 11–5 1980 Browns went to the 1980-81 NFL playoffs under head coach Sam Rutigliano, but lost in the first round to the Oakland Raiders 14–12.

Darden was ranked 47th on the Cleveland Browns top 100 players list.

== Post-football ==
In 1985, government informant, David Rice, testified in Cuyahoga County Common Pleas Court that Darden was listed as a suspected dealer of cocaine in a document that he had been given by the Federal Bureau of Investigation while he was being wired with a hidden microphone. Darden was vociferous in his denial of the claim.

Darden has served as a professional sports agent and represented Tony Boles. In 1990, he invested $25,000 in Boles by hosting him in Cleveland, Ohio and working him out with athletic trainers. At the time he was Cleveland-based sports agent. During Darden's career as an agent he represented an assortment of NFL and National Basketball Association players and prospects including Felix Wright and Chris Calloway. He was a supporter of Maurice Clarett's attempt to challenge the NFL draft's eligibility rules. In 1998, when the NFL reissued a franchise in Cleveland, Darden was part of one of the six bidding groups. In 1999, he owned a security company in Cedar Rapids, Iowa. As of 2006, Darden was a business consultant living in Cedar Rapids.
