= 1971 All-Big Ten Conference football team =

American college football all-star team

The 1971 All-Big Ten Conference football team consists of American football players chosen by various organizations for All-Big Ten Conference teams for the 1971 Big Ten Conference football season.

== Offensive selections ==
=== Quarterbacks ===
- Maurie Daigneau, Northwestern (AP-1; UPI-1)
- Craig Curry, Minnesota (AP-2; UPI-2)

=== Running backs ===
- Eric Allen, Michigan State (AP-1; UPI-1)
- Rufus Ferguson, Wisconsin (AP-1; UPI-1)
- Billy Taylor, Michigan (AP-1; UPI-1)
- Otis Armstrong, Purdue (AP-2; UPI-2)
- Ernie Cook, Minnesota (AP-2; UPI-2)
- Al Robinson, Northwestern (AP-2)
- Ed Shuttlesworth, Michigan (UPI-2)

=== Ends ===
- Doug Kingsriter, Minnesota (AP-1; UPI-1 [tight end])
- Barry Pearson, Northwestern (AP-1; UPI-1 [wide receiver])
- Billy Joe Dupree, Michigan State (AP-2)
- Rick Sayers, Purdue (AP-2)
- Glenn Doughty, Michigan (UPI-2 [wide receiver])
- Paul Seymour, Michigan (UPI-2 [tight end])

=== Tackles ===
- Tom Luken, Purdue (AP-1; UPI-1)
- Tom McCreight, Northwestern (AP-1)
- Rick Simon, Ohio State (UPI-1)
- Jack Babcock, Minnesota (AP-2)
- Curtis Tucker, Michigan (AP-2)
- Jim Brandstatter, Michigan (UPI-2)
- Jim Coode, Michigan (UPI-2)
- Tom Bove, Indiana (AP-2)

=== Guards ===
- Joe DeLamielleure, Michigan State (AP-1; UPI-1)
- Reggie McKenzie, Michigan (AP-1; UPI-1)
- Tom Coyle, Michigan (AP-2; UPI-2)
- Tom Kruyer, Indiana (AP-2; UPI-2)

=== Centers ===
- Tom DeLeone, Ohio State (AP-1; UPI-1)
- Guy Murdock, Michigan (AP-2; UPI-2)

== Defensive selections ==
=== Ends ===
- Tab Bennett, Illinois (AP-1; UPI-1)
- Mike Keller, Michigan (AP-1)
- Gary Hrivnak, Purdue (UPI-1)
- Alden Carpenter, Michigan (UPI-2)
- Wil Hemby, Northwestern (UPI-2)

=== Tackles ===
- Ron Curl, Michigan State (AP-1; UPI-1)
- George Hasenohrl, Ohio State (AP-1; UPI-1)
- Tom Beckman, Michigan (AP-2)
- Dave Butz, Purdue (AP-2; UPI-2)
- Jim Anderson, Northwestern (UPI-2)

=== Guards ===
- Gregg Bingham, Purdue (UPI-1)
- Ernest Hamilton, Michigan State (UPI-2)

=== Linebackers ===
- Mike Taylor, Michigan (AP-1; UPI-1)
- Bill Light, Minnesota (AP-1; UPI-2)
- Stan White, Ohio State (AP-1; UPI-2)
- Randy Gradishar, Ohio State (AP-2; UPI-1)
- Dave Lokanc, Wisconsin (AP-2)
- John Voorhees, Northwestern (AP-2)

=== Defensive backs ===
- Thom Darden, Michigan (AP-1; UPI-1)
- Eric Hutchinson, Northwestern (AP-1; UPI-1)
- Brad Van Pelt, Michigan State (AP-1; UPI-1)
- Craig Clemons, Iowa (UPI-1)
- Jerry Brown, Northwestern (AP-2)
- John Graham, Illinois (AP-2)
- Neovia Greyer, Wisconsin (AP-2)
- Chuck Piebes, Purdue (AP-2)
- Tom Campana, Ohio State (UPI-2)
- Jack Duston, Northwestern (UPI-2)
- Harry Howard, Ohio State (UPI-2)
- Willie Osley, Illinois (UPI-2)

== Key ==
AP = Associated Press, selected by the AP's Midwest board and Big Ten football experts

UPI = United Press International, selected by the conference coaches

Bold = Consensus first-team selection by both AP and UPI

== See also ==
- 1971 College Football All-America Team
