= David Joyner (athletic director) =

Orthopedic physician, and collegiate athletic director

Biographical details
- Education: Pennsylvania State University

Playing career
- 1968–1971: Penn State
- Position: Tackle

Administrative career (AD unless noted)
- 2011–2015: Penn State

Accomplishments and honors

Awards
- Consensus All-American (1971); First-team All-East (1971)

David M. Joyner, an orthopedic physician and a former member of the Penn State University Board of Trustees, is a former athletic director for Penn State.

He played football for Penn State in the 1970s. He wrestled for Penn State as well, finishing second in the 1971 NCAA Championships at heavyweight. He graduated from Penn State in 1972 with a degree in science and received his medical doctorate from Penn State in 1976. He worked as an orthopedic surgeon and later worked with the World Football League.

He focused his career on sports medicine, e.g. as chair of the United States Olympic Sports Medicine Committee. He served as chairman of the U.S. Olympic Committee's Sports Medicine Committee from 1993 to 2000 and oversaw the committee in charge of anti-doping during a time that is remembered as being tainted by pervasive doping. For example, US athletes Lance Armstrong, Marion Jones, and the men's relay team were eventually stripped of the medals won during the 2000 Sydney Olympics. There were also allegations of unethical testing procedures. In July 2000 Dr. Wade Exum filed suit against the USOC, alleging that it "evaded its responsibility to screen and discipline athletes for drugs in its quest to produce medal-winners."

He founded Joyner Sports Medicine Institute Inc., which was later bought by NovaCare. Joyner was elected by Penn State alumni to the Penn State Board of Trustees in July 2000 to a three-year term, and re-elected in 2003, 2006, and 2009.

Joyner was a member of the Penn State Board of Trustees that dismissed Joe Paterno in November 2011, amid the media firestorm surrounding the announcement of charges against Jerry Sandusky, although Paterno had not been charged with any crime and had been named as a cooperating witness for the prosecution. (A subsequent inquiry headed by Louis Freeh, which was later found to be flawed with a pre-determined conclusion, determined that Paterno was aware of allegations against Sandusky in 1998, that he had monitored an investigation of Sandusky, and that he denied both facts publicly after the Sandusky store broke nationally in 2011.)

== Athletic director ==
Joyner, who was at the time a university trustee, was named Penn State's acting athletic director in November 2011 after athletic director Timothy Curley was placed on administrative leave following his indictment for perjury and failing to report possible child abuse in connection with the Penn State sex abuse scandal. Joyner had no prior experience as an athletic director, and some observers have questioned the propriety of the board of trustees moving one of their own members into a position that reportedly pays an annual salary of $396,000. In a report released in November 2012, the Pennsylvania Auditor General recommended that Penn State should avoid such transfers, stating, "this movement gives rise to reasonable public perceptions of insider influence and conflicting interests, particularly when the movement involves persons at executive levels." Notwithstanding this recommendation, in January 2013 Penn State announced that Joyner had been named permanent AD.

Joyner pledged to rehabilitate the athletic department and return to core values as an academic unit, saying, "Now if we've lost some of that luster because of things that have happened, I can tell you that I've never lost that core value, and this athletic department will reflect that core value."

In October 2012 Joyner and Penn State president Rodney Erickson were booed by fans attending a Penn State football game.
