= Ernie Cook =

Ernest Cornelius Cook Jr (September 24, 1950) was an American football player. He played college football for the University of Minnesota Golden Gophers from 1968 to 1972, earning second-team honors on the 1972 All-Big Ten Conference football team. He was named to Playboy’s preseason All-America team in September 1971.

== Early life ==
Cook was born in Daytona Beach, Florida, in 1950 to Ernest and Alice Cook.

From a young age, he had a burning desire for knowledge that often found him reading the World Book Encyclopedia over breakfast.

This love of learning was fostered by his father, Ernest Cook Sr., an accountant who ultimately served as Vice President for fiscal affairs at Bethune–Cookman University, and his mother Alice Cook who taught at the Bonner Elementary school (E. Cook, personal communication).

He began his football career playing for the Campbell Street Junior High Spartans.

The oldest of three children, Cook set the standard for his siblings and was never content with the status quo; always seeking the next experience, opportunity, or improvement.

== High school ==
He played most of his high school games with the all-black Campbell Street High School Centipedes of the Big Nine North Conference. Throughout his career at Campbell, he would consistently score more and run farther than anyone else on the team.

Over the summer of 1966, he was one of a small number of students chosen to attend a pre-college study session at Bethune–Cookman University. Not content to just observe and learn, he became President of his cohort there.

Named the Campbell High Sentinel Scholar of the Month in November 1966, he was an active student. In addition to maintaining a B+ average and achieving membership in the National Honor Society, he was Captain of the Centipede football team, Vice President of both his home room and the Student Council, member of the Art Appreciation Club, and Secretary of his Sunday School at Mt Zion Baptist Church. He was also a member of the Beta Delta Lambda chapter of Alpha Phi Alpha.

As a sophomore, he was named to the All-Conference team; the only 10th grade student to be named to the team in the history of the Big-9 North conference.. Although he had already achieved great success playing football at Campbell, it seemed these accomplishments were never really given the publicity they should have received.. He knew his chances of a college scholarship increased if he could attend Father Lopez Catholic High School where the Green Wave had fielded a black wide receiver the previous year. Coach Bud Asher, who moonlighted as a San Diego Charger scout, had the college contacts Cook was seeking. After an impromptu try-out, he and two friends, Rhodell Fields and James Edward Peterson, found themselves welcomed to Father Lopez.

One of three Offensive Captains in his first and only year at Father Lopez High School, he established his value early and often. By the time the team had achieved a 7-1 record, he was the team’s leading scorer, the reason they were being considered for a bowl game and was a top prospect at the fullback position Florida.

The senior year of high school often sets the stage for the arc of one’s life, and Cook’s time at Father Lopez was foundational. Jim Schwarz, the starting fullback for the Green Wave in 1972, moved to offensive tackle so Ernie could carry the football. In a show of solidarity, Schwarz also left a gym that refused entry to Cook, Fields, and Peterson; a rare show of enlightenment at the time. Later, Coach Asher would describe Cook as, “the best fullback [he] ever coached.

The 1967-1968 Father Lopez players and coaches welcomed their black teammates, but opponents weren't always so enlightened. Road games were always adventurous and could result in unpredictable issues. A road game in Duval County had the opposing Baldwin High white players taunting Cook and friends on the field and someone locked the visitor’s locker room after Father Lopez’ win. The stadium lights were shut off, and the team remained locked out of the facility. It took a white coach’s intervention to open the locker room. As the team exited the stadium to board the bus that would take them home, white Baldwin students had the bus surrounded and threw rocks at the black players.

Eventually, Cook had the best revenge a black athlete of the time could. Father Lopez finished their season 9-1, largely due to the performance of their starting running back. He ran for more than 1,100 yards, bulldozing his way over racial stereotypes and barriers on and off the gridiron. He was selected for the Class B, Region III football team by the Florida Sports Writers Association. While being named to the Florida State All-Star football team, and being voted class president and valedictorian, his performance was garnering the attention of college scouts.

== Florida State University ==
Florida State University had several players heralding from the Daytona Beach area at the time. This included end T. K. Wetherell, whose father, Thomas "T. J.” Wetherell, was a Sears, Roebuck & Co store manager in the city. One of the few merchants in the area that would employ blacks, even promoting them to visible roles, the store also allowed blacks into integrated dressing rooms. T. J. had first contact with the Cook’s about Ernie attending FSU. The family visited the campus twice after this contact. Twice the white players on the team were welcoming. However, more than one of the coaches suggested Cook also tour the all-black Florida A&M University. A subtle, but clear message.

Still, Cook was eager to integrate the FSU team. No official announcement had yet been made, but by mid-December 1967 it was becoming apparent the Seminoles would soon welcome its first black football player. On December 22, 1967, Cook signed a scholarship to play Seminole football in a televised ceremony held at the Castaway Beach Motel in Daytona Beach. Unfortunately, the family soon began receiving anonymous, unsigned letters threatening to kill the then 17-year-old Ernie Cook if he played in Tallahassee.

The US Federal Bureau of Investigation arrived and examined the letters. Alice Cook’s thoughts hearkened back to her childhood in a small, all-black farming community close to Tallahassee where she remembered lynchings of people she knew. She began to wonder at what level the Ku Klux Klan might be involved in these threats. Despite assurances from his potential white teammates and coaches, these racial threats forced him to consider other schools, including Northwestern and the University of Minnesota that had begun recruitment efforts by that time.

T. K. Wetherell, FSU’s President, attempted to correct the wrongdoings of the past and make up for all the hateful, racist letters and attacks the Cook family endured 40 years before. In 2008, Wetherell invited Ernie to serve as commencement speaker for the graduates of the Class of 2008. On April 26, 2008, Cook was awarded an Honorary Doctorate of Humane Letters at that ceremony to formally recognize that he could have earned his medical degree in his home state of Florida vice travelling across country.

== University of Minnesota ==
The Golden Gophers had a strong history of accepting black athletes onto their teams. During the ‘60s, Sandy Stephens, Bobby Bell, Carl Eller, and Charlie Sanders, among others, led the team to two Rose Bowl appearances and launched Pro Football Hall of Fame careers for all but Sandy Stephens. UofM alumni, including NAACP Executive Director Roy Wilkins, sent Cook letters encouraging him to attend their alma mater. After a single visit to the campus, where the atmosphere and people enchanted, Ernie had found his collegiate future.

His tenure at the university introduced him to many luminaries across a broad spectrum of professions. Former U. S. Vice President Hubert Humphrey knew him by name and invited his sister into his box at Memorial Stadium when she visited. Cook was assigned to the coaching-search committee that selected Herb Brooks as the Hockey coach eight years before he coached the U. S. to a gold medal in the sport t the 1980 Winter Olympics.

Cook began his illustrious Big Ten career when team Captain, three-year starter, and 1967 Co-Big Ten Champion Jim Carter injured his ankle in the first period of the season’s third game on November 8, 1969 in a game against Big Ten rival Northwestern. Cook made the most of this opportunity in his sophomore season by rushing for 141 yards on 25 carries and scoring the winning touchdown with 9:34 to play in the fourth quarter, sealing the win for the Gophers. WCCO-TV and Midwest Federal named him the Gopher Sophomore of the year.

Cook gained a single season record 881 yards on 177 carries averaging 5 yards per carry in 1971. He also caught 19 passes for 143 yards and one touchdown, breaking Paul Giel’s record set in 1952.

On a side note, Cook crossed paths with a 17-yr old Tony Dungy when Cook was in his first year of medical school and Dungy was visiting Minnesota on a recruiting trip. Although Cook had been drafted by an NFL team, his choice to forgo the predicted path into professional football and pursue a medical degree made an impression on a young Dungy that he would later recount in his book Uncommon: Finding Your Path to Significance.

== Later life ==
Following residency at the University of Florida in Jacksonville, in 1981 Cook founded Atlantic Family Practice and Atlantic Medical Associates in his hometown of Daytona Beach. Just six blocks from his boyhood home, Dr Cook and his future wife Betty created a medical practice that cared for everyone with equal compassion (E. Cook, personal communication).

In addition to seeing everyday patients, they established the Volusia County Sickle Cell Disease Foundation, served on the boards of the Volusia County Human Immunodeficiency Disease Free clinic, Memorial Hospital Hospice/Palliative Care Service, and Halifax Health Hospice and Palliative Care. They also volunteered their time at the Halifax Humane Society and Sickle Cell Foundation of Florida. September 2, 1981 was declared “Ernie Cook Day” by the Daytona Beach mayor (E. Cook, personal communication).

While leading his family practice, Dr Cook also served as an Embry–Riddle Aeronautical University staff physician and Humana Health Plan of North Central Florida Medical Director. He also serves as a First Union Bank of Daytona Beach Director, is on the boards of Anti-Recidivist Effort, Inc, the Volusia County Sickle Cell Association, and the Black Police Officers Association, and is active in the Daytona Beach Civic League, is a member of the Rotary Club, and the Community Health and Sports Medicine Committee Chairman.

In 2006, Cigna HealthCare of Florida hired Cook as a Senior Market Medical Executive.

== See also ==
- 1971 All-Big Ten Conference football team
