= Clarence Ellis (American football) =

American football player (born 1950)

No. 29
- Position: Safety

Personal information
- Born: February 11, 1950 (age 76); Grand Rapids, Michigan, U.S.
- Listed height: 5 ft 11 in (1.80 m)
- Listed weight: 193 lb (88 kg)

Career information
- High school: Central (MI)
- College: Notre Dame
- NFL draft: 1972: 1st round, 15th overall pick

Career history
- Atlanta Falcons (1972–1974)

Awards and highlights
- Consensus All-American (1971); First-team All-American (1970)

Career NFL statistics
- Interceptions: 8
- Fumble recoveries: 3
- Sacks: 1
- Stats at Pro Football Reference

Clarence Ellis (born February 11, 1950) is an American former professional football player who was a safety for the Atlanta Falcons of the National Football League (NFL). He was selected 15th overall by the Falcons in the 1972 NFL draft.

He played college football at Notre Dame, where he was an All-American and part of the Fighting Irish team that defeated the previously undefeated Texas Longhorns in the 1971 Cotton Bowl game.
