= Randy Gradishar =

American football player (born 1952)

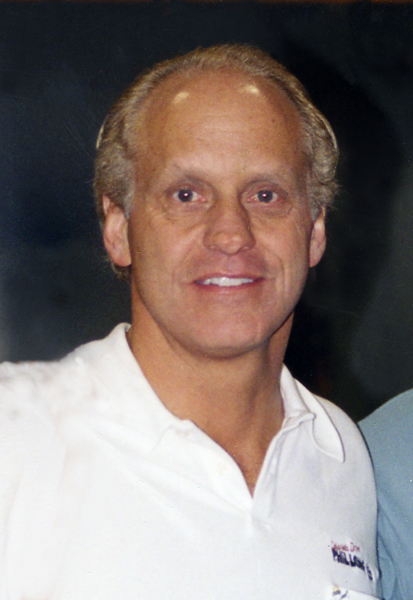
- Gradishar in 2003

No. 52, 53
- Position: Linebacker

Personal information
- Born: March 3, 1952 (age 74); Warren, Ohio, U.S.
- Listed height: 6 ft 3 in (1.91 m)
- Listed weight: 233 lb (106 kg)

Career information
- High school: Champion (Champion Township, Ohio)
- College: Ohio State
- NFL draft: 1974: 1st round, 14th overall pick

Career history
- Denver Broncos (1974–1983)

Awards and highlights
- NFL Defensive Player of the Year (1978); 2× First-team All-Pro (1977, 1978); 3× Second-team All-Pro (1979, 1981, 1983); 7× Pro Bowl (1975, 1977–1979, 1981–1983); Denver Broncos Ring of Fame; Unanimous All-American (1973); Consensus All-American (1972); 3× First-team All-Big Ten (1971, 1972, 1973); Ohio State Varsity Hall of Fame; Ohio State Football All-Century Team

Career NFL statistics
- Sacks: 19.5 (Note: 4.5 of his 19.5 career sacks are "official," since that category did not become official until 1982, Gradishar's next-to-last season))
- Interceptions: 20
- Touchdowns: 4
- Tackles: 2,049
- Stats at Pro Football Reference
- Pro Football Hall of Fame
- College Football Hall of Fame

Randolph Charles Gradishar (born March 3, 1952) is an American former professional football player who was a linebacker for 10 seasons with the Denver Broncos of the National Football League (NFL) during the 1970s and 1980s. A native of Ohio, Gradishar was a one-time consensus and one-time unanimous All-American playing college football for the Ohio State Buckeyes, before playing ten seasons for Denver, where he was the centerpiece of their "Orange Crush Defense". In 2024, he was inducted into the Pro Football Hall of Fame.

== Early life ==
The son of a Puebloan of Slovene ancestry, Gradishar is a 1970 graduate of Champion High School, Champion, Ohio. During his high school career, Randy lettered all three years in both football and basketball. As a high school football player, Randy received honors including All-League, All-County, and the Star Helmet Award.

In basketball, he was the leading rebounder for three years and the second leading scorer for two years, receiving All-League and All-County honors. Randy holds the high school records for most blocked shots (44), single game rebounds (26), and most career rebounds (817).

In 2004, Randy was inducted into the Champion High School Hall of Fame for Athletics. He was presented by his former high school coach, Al Carrino.

== College career ==
Gradishar, who graduated with a degree in Distributive Education, was a three-year starter with the Ohio State University from 1971 to 1973. Former Ohio State head coach Woody Hayes called Gradishar "the best linebacker I ever coached". He made 134 tackles in his senior year, 60 of them solo, to lead the team.

"Randy Gradishar is the finest linebacker I ever coached"
—Woody Hayes

In Gradishar's three years with the Buckeyes, all as a starter, the team had a 25–6–1 record, with two Big Ten Conference championships. Gradishar's final collegiate game was a 42–21 victory over the University of Southern California in the 1974 Rose Bowl, to complete a 10–0–1 season. In his senior season the Ohio State defense allowed only 64 points and posted four shutouts.

Against Washington State in 1973, Gradishar made 22 tackles, then the second most in a game in Ohio State history, and still stands as 9th best. His 320 career tackles were the most in school history when Gradishar left Ohio State and now stands as 11th best in team history.

Gradishar was a consensus First-team All-American in 1972 and a unanimous First-team selection in 1973. Also in 1973, Gradishar finished sixth in the voting for the Heisman Trophy.

=== 1973 Heisman voting ===
Place	Player, School, Position, Year	Points
1st	John Cappelletti, Penn State, RB, Sr.	1,057
2nd	John Hicks, Ohio State, OT, Jr.	524
3rd	Roosevelt Leaks, Texas, RB, Jr.	482
4th	David Jaynes, Kansas, QB, Sr.	394
5th	Archie Griffin, Ohio State, RB, So.	326
6th	Randy Gradishar, Ohio State, LB, Sr.	282
7th	Lucious Selmon, Oklahoma, NG, Sr.	250
8th	Woody Green, Arizona State, RB, Sr.	247
9th	Danny White, Arizona State, QB, Sr.	166
10th	Kermit Johnson, UCLA, RB, Sr.	122

Randy was also academic All-American in 1973. According to scouts Gradishar was a linebacker who went out every day with his hard hat and lunch pail and got the job done. When naming Gradishar All-American Time stated he was the "best Big Ten linebacker in three years" Gradishar is a punishing tackler capable of penetrating any block, and, say the scouts, "he has that great pro quality—the ability to cover somebody else's mistake." Before entering the National Football League Gradishar played in the Hula Bowl and the Coaches' All-American game in 1974.

While attending the Ohio State University, Gradishar joined the Delta Upsilon fraternity.

=== College legacy ===
Gradishar was inducted into the Ohio State Varsity O Hall of Fame in 1983. In 1987, he was inducted into the Colorado Sports Hall of Fame. Gradishar was elected to the GTE Academic Hall of Fame in 1992. Ohio State's director of athletics, Ed Weaver, said, "No more outstanding young man has participated in our athletic program." Gradishar was inducted into the College Football Hall of Fame in 1998. In 1999 Gradishar received the Dick Butkus Silver Anniversary Award recognizing his achievements 25 years after his graduation from Ohio State. He was selected to the Ohio State Football All-Century Team in 2000.

The Ohio State end-of-season award for most outstanding linebacker is known as the Randy Gradishar Award. Gradishar himself was named as the 8th best Ohio State player of all time. He also made the list of the top 100 college football players of all time. In 2000, he was named to ABC Sports's All-Century team as an inside linebacker.

== Professional career ==
Gradishar was drafted in the first round with the 14th overall pick in the 1974 NFL draft by the Denver Broncos. Gradishar went on to spend ten seasons with the Denver Broncos franchise. He played along with Tom Jackson as part of the Orange Crush Defense and is considered by some to be the greatest defensive player in Broncos history. Teammate Jim Jensen said Gradishar and Roger Staubach were the two best players he ever took the field with.

He became a starter midway through his rookie season and was named to his first Pro Bowl after the 1975 season, his third in the NFL. From that season through his last, 1983, the Broncos "Orange Crush" defense allowed the third fewest rushing yards in the NFL, behind only the Steelers "Steel Curtain" defense and the Cowboys' "Doomsday" defense. Additionally, the Broncos trailed only the Steelers in the fewest yards per rush during that same span. They have been named one of the NFL's greatest defenses by the BBC and others.

Gradishar became nationally known in a 1975 Monday Night Football game versus the Green Bay Packers in which he picked off a pass and returned it for a game-sealing touchdown while also recording a sack, two tackles for loss and knocked down two passes and recorded six solo tackles.

In 1976 the Broncos switched to a 3–4 defense in which Gradishar moved from middle linebacker to inside linebacker, where he stayed the remainder of his career. The switch to the 3–4 defense gave Gradishar responsibilities relative to rush-lane discipline and pass coverage that are beyond those of a middle linebacker in the 4–3 defense. In addition to leading the Broncos in tackles for the second straight year, Gradishar led all NFL linebackers in sacks, with seven. He was voted second-team All-AFC by United Press International.

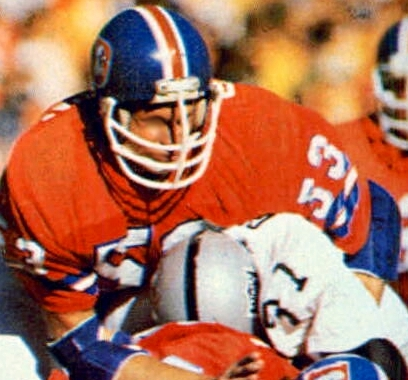
Gradishar (53) playing for the Broncos in 1977 AFC Championship Game.

In 1977, Gradishar assisted the Broncos to Super Bowl XII, their very first. He earned Pro Bowl honors and was named first team All-Pro. He anchored a defense that led the AFC in fewest points allowed (148 in the 14-game season) and gave up the 6th-fewest yards. Gradishar was also voted the AFC Defensive Player of the Year by the Columbus Touchdown Club. The 1977 Broncos season is documented in a new book by Terry Frei, '77: Denver, the Broncos, and a Coming of Age that features Gradishar, Lyle Alzado and others. The 1977 Broncos season began with a 7–0 shutout of the St. Louis Cardinals that had been one of the NFL's top offenses from 1974–1976 that featured offensive stars like Jim Hart, Terry Metcalf, Mel Gray, Dan Dierdorf and Conrad Dobler. In a 14–7 win against the Kansas City Chiefs the Broncos made a goal line stand as time expired to preserve a win. Denver Post staff writer Terry Frei's book, 77: Denver, the Broncos, and a Coming of Age, put it this way, "Gradishar penetrated and stopped two running plays, as Gradishar did time and time again on the goal line in his career. It was the trademark of both Gradishar and the defense overall".

He was named consensus NFL Defensive Player of the Year in 1978 by winning the Associated Press Award, along with the UPI Defensive Player of the Year award and the NEA Defensive MVP award, receiving the George Halas Trophy for his efforts as the Broncos reached the playoffs for the second straight season. The Broncos defense allowed 198 points in 16 games, which was second in the NFL behind the Super Bowl champion Steelers. Additionally, Gradishar was the Football Digest NFL Linebacker of the year in 1978, an honor he repeated in 1979.

The following season, 1979, the Broncos defense ranked 5th in fewest points allowed and Gradishar led the team in tackles for the 5th straight season. The 1980 season was average in terms of record (8–8) and statistics as the Broncos defense ranked in the middle of the pack in many defensive categories. Against the Cleveland Browns at Cleveland Stadium, Gradishar returned an interception 93 yards for a touchdown which was his career long interception return, a team record, and one of four defensive touchdowns Gradishar scored in his career. He was also named All-Pro and was voted the Broncos Most Valuable Player for the second time in three years.

However, under new coach Dan Reeves the Bronco defense rebounded in 1981, ranking 6th in total defense and 9th in fewest points allowed as Broncos finished the season with a record of 10-6. Randy had one of his best seasons as he was consensus All-Pro and All-AFC as well as being voted to the Pro Bowl.

The Broncos returned to the playoffs in 1983, led by rookie quarterback John Elway and Gradishar, as he capped off his career with his seventh Pro Bowl in ten NFL seasons. In week 12 of 1983 season, against the Seattle Seahawks, Gradishar intercepted a pass, recovered a fumble, recorded a sack, and a tackle for loss to go with his season-high 15 tackles in a key 38–27 win.

=== NFL legacy ===
"If you ask me to name the five best linebackers I played against, or had a chance to cover in my broadcasting career, Randy Gradishar would be on that list ... There is no question about his credentials; Randy Gradishar belongs in the Hall of Fame."
—Merlin Olsen

His former coach Dan Reeves said about Gradishar, "He was as good a linebacker as I have ever been around, and I have been around some great ones. He was a leader without question of our defense while I was with Denver. He was an exceptional football player. I had a great deal of respect for him when I was at Dallas before I ever went to Denver. After I arrived in Denver and saw what kind of a leader he was my respect for him grew. He never missed a game and was a dominant force on the field. The opposing team always had to take him into account when they devised their game plans."

Randy Gradishar was called, "the heart and soul of the original Orange Crush defense. He was the centerpiece of Joe Collier's 3-4 and the glue that held a ragtag bunch of degenerates and hand-me-downs (I mean that in a good way) together." Pro Football Weekly's personnel scout Joel Buchsbaum wrote that "there are quite a few scouts who will tell you that former Broncos ILB Randy Gradishar was almost as good, even as good, as Jack Lambert" and "unlike Lambert, Gradishar was not a flashy headhunter, just a great anticipator who was a deadly tackler and great short-yardage defender".

When naming the top linebackers ever, Buchsbaum wrote, concerning Gradishar, "Maybe the smartest and most underrated ever. Had rare instincts, was faster than Lambert and very effective in short-yardage and goal-line situations. The fact he is not in the Hall of Fame is a shame and may be attributed to the fact he was a sure tackler but not a lights-out hitter or look-at-me type of player." In 2006 was named by Riddell author Jonathan Rand as one of the Top 25 linebackers of all-time.

Pro Football Weekly published these comments collected from NFL scouts, "Superior diagnostician with exceptional strength, balance, tackling form and very good lateral mobility. Not as flashy or brutal as some ILBs but means almost as much to Denver's defense as Walter Payton does to Chicago's offense" and "Is most dominant defender in AFC when healthy. Although not as brutal as Butkus or Bergey, he's strong at the point of attack, does a superb job of playing off blocks and getting to the ball, gets good depth on his pass drops and is consistently excellent"

Zander Hollander, who wrote The Complete Handbook of Pro Football, said about Gradishar, "Not as nasty as Butkus, doesn't snarl like Lambert, but Gradishar makes all the plays. Hey, he can hit, too. Just ask Saints' Henry Childs, after Gradishar knocked his helmet off, "It was the first in my career like that, in the open field". Gradishar's hitting ability was a sentiment echoed in Rick Korch's book, The Truly Great. In it, Tony Dorsett recalled the hit Gradishar gave him in a 1980 game, "I ran a pass pattern and was wide open but Danny White did not see me. I go back to the huddle and tell Danny that I am wide open. I ran the same route again but this time I was almost decapitated. My eyes were only partially open when I hit the ground. Trainers and doctors came running onto the field. They thought I was dead. Hey, I thought I was dead, too." Hall of Fame defensive lineman Dan Hampton remembers asking Walter Payton, "Walter, who gave you the hardest hit you ever took in the NFL?". According to Hampton, Payton replied, "Randy Gradishar, 1978". In 1981 SPORT magazine named Gradishar one of the Top 5 hardest hitters in the NFL, quoting the modest Gradishar, "The chance for a real good shot comes very seldom, but when it's there I take full advantage of it".

NFL Films' Steve Sabol said this about Gradishar, "His range separated him from others at his position. A sure and determined tackler, he was also an excellent pass defender. He had special qualities in terms of intelligence, preparation and athletic ability. His "play anticipation" was the best in football. He had a great ability to square his body into the ball carrier at the moment of impact; which made him an incredible performer on third or fourth and short." Detroit Lions General Manager and fellow inside linebacker Matt Millen added, "Randy Gradishar was one of the most productive players I've watched. He was always around the ball, rarely out of position, and constantly making plays. Linebackers are difficult to evaluate because there is a lack of statistics. But someone like a Randy Gradishar was easy to judge because of what he produced." Additionally, Joe DeLamielleure, the Hall of Fame guard of the Bills said that "Randy was a great linebacker, and he certainly belongs in the Pro Football Hall of Fame. He was tough, smart, and played every down all out. I can tell you he was very tough to catch."

Mike Giddings of Proscout, Inc., added that "Gradishar could cover the "Y" flat on a weakside linebacker blitzed. In recent times only Gradishar and Lambert could do that". Additionally, coach Joe Collier would have a unique coverage on a strong-side blitz in which Gradishar, the right inside linebacker would be responsible to cover the tight end, man-to-man, on any "up" route in the "seam", which would be on the opposite side of the formation. To do so he would have to take the exact angle to get proper depth while going across the field and an angle, according to Giddings, Gradishar "could, and did".

In January 2008, he was voted by a panel of former NFL players and coaches to Pro Football Weekly's All-Time 3-4 defensive team along with Harry Carson, Lawrence Taylor, Andre Tippett, Howie Long, Lee Roy Selmon, and Curley Culp.

Gradishar retired after the 1983 season, finishing his career with the NFL record for most tackles all time with 2,049, and 20 interceptions, which he returned for 335 yards and three touchdowns. He also recovered 13 fumbles, returning them for 72 yards and one touchdown. He also recorded 20 sacks according to Bronco team records.

After his retirement, Gradishar was nominated for the Pro Football Hall of Fame multiple times, was not enshrined until 2024. He was among the 15 finalists in 2003 and 2008, and made the top 25 list in 2005 and 2007. The closest he came to induction prior to 2024 was the day before the 2003 Super Bowl, when he made it to list of final ten. In August 2023, Gradishar, along with Art Powell and Steve McMichael, was selected as a senior finalist to the Hall of Fame's Class of 2024. On February 8, 2024, Gradishar was officially selected for induction, becoming the first member of the 1977 Denver Broncos to be selected to the Hall of Fame.

Gradishar was inducted to the Broncos' Ring of Fame in 1989 and into the Colorado Sports Hall of Fame in 1987. The Professional Football Researchers Association named Gradishar to the PRFA Hall of Very Good Class of 2008.

== Post-NFL activities ==
- Has made several trips to the Middle East, visiting troops in Iraq and Afghanistan, as well as visiting Kyrgyzstan, Kuwait, Bahrain, Saudi Arabia, the United Arab Emirates and Qatar.
- Was president of the Denver Broncos Youth Foundation from 1982 to 1992
- Served on the NFL Players Special Advisory Council from 1992 to 1995.
- Currently the Corporate Communications Ambassador for the Phil Long car dealerships in Colorado.
- Has a left ring finger shaped like the number "7".
- Was sympathetic to college coach Woody Hayes when he punched a player in the 1978 Gator Bowl. Gradishar knew Hayes would be fired but stated publicly that "We all go off the deep end sometimes. Woody just happened to do it in front of millions of people." Gradishar emphasized the positive aspects of Hayes: "Every time you talked to him, it was, 'How are you doing in school, when are you going to graduate, are you going to be a doctor or a lawyer?'"
- Worked with Promise Keepers in Denver from 1994–97.
- Participated in the Susan G. Komen for the Cure celebrity race to raise awareness and funds for research into curing breast cancer.
- Serves as an Honorary Chair for the Susan G. Komen for the Cure organization.
- Is president of the Phil Long Community Fund, a non-profit organization that provides financial resources to help champion self-esteem and the leadership of young people through excellence in education, sports, and recreation.
- Known for wearing a rare Riddell mask that Helmet Hut expert Dr. DelRye thought was one of the few Riddell models that "looked cool".
