= Willie Osley =

American football player (born 1951)

No. 47, 37
- Position: Defensive back

Personal information
- Born: April 10, 1951 (age 75); Detroit, Michigan, U.S.
- Listed height: 6 ft 0 in (1.83 m)
- Listed weight: 195 lb (88 kg)

Career information
- High school: Denby (Detroit)
- College: Illinois
- NFL draft: 1973: 10th round, 251st overall pick

Career history
- New England Patriots (1974); Kansas City Chiefs (1974)

Awards and highlights
- Second-team All-Big Ten (1971)
- Stats at Pro Football Reference

Willie Osley (born April 10, 1951) is an American former professional football player who was a defensive back in the National Football League (NFL). He played college football for the Illinois Fighting Illini. He played in the NFL for the New England Patriots and Kansas City Chiefs in 1974.
