= Sherman White (American football) =

American football player (born 1948)

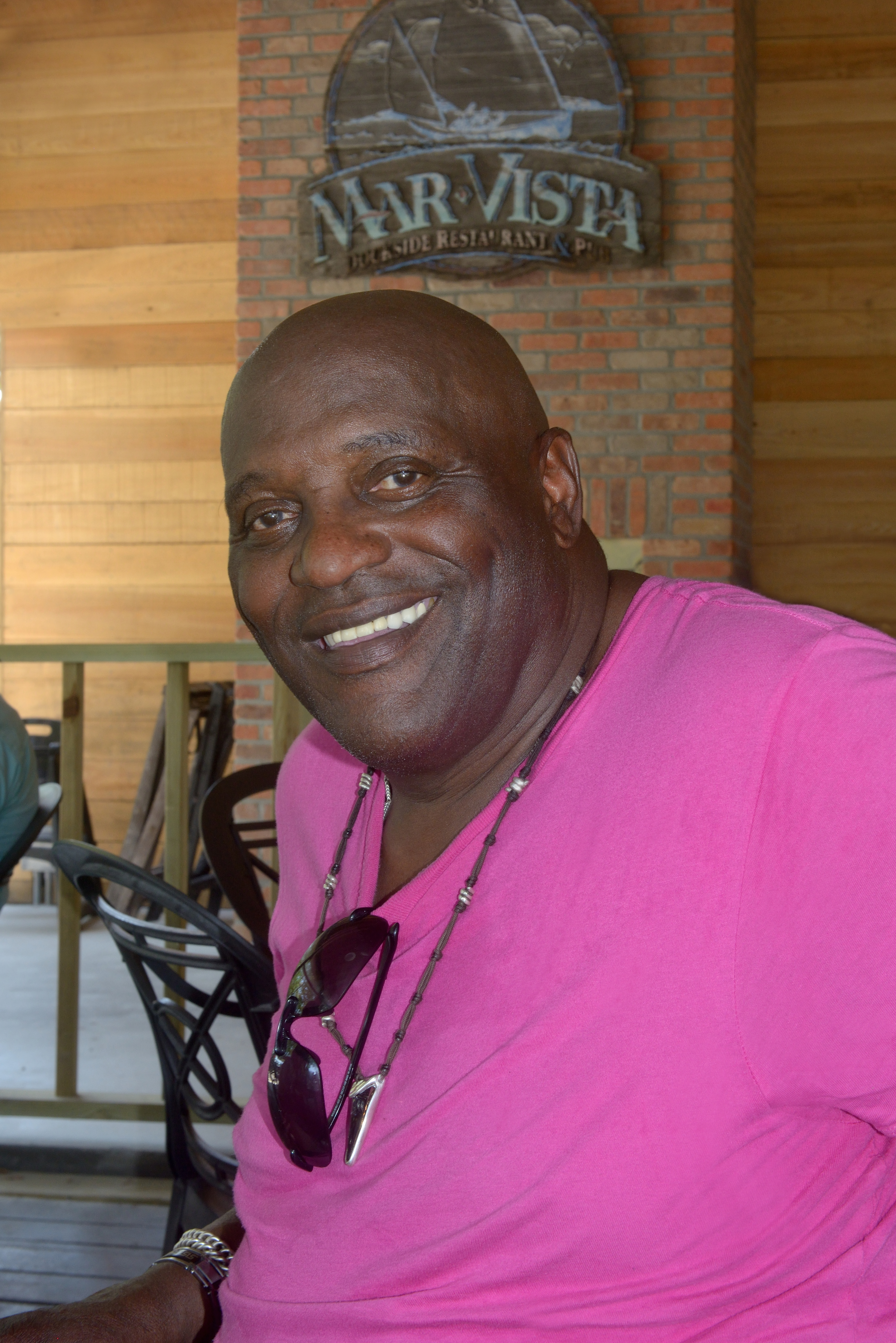
- White in 2017

No. 83
- Position: Defensive end

Personal information
- Born: October 6, 1948 (age 78); Manchester, New Hampshire, U.S.
- Listed height: 6 ft 5 in (1.96 m)
- Listed weight: 250 lb (113 kg)

Career information
- High school: Portsmouth (NH)
- College: California
- NFL draft: 1972: 1st round, 2nd overall pick

Career history
- Cincinnati Bengals (1972–1975); Buffalo Bills (1976–1983)

Awards and highlights
- Consensus All-American (1971); 2× First-team All-Pac-8 (1970, 1971)

Career NFL statistics
- Sacks: 63
- Fumble recoveries: 11
- Interceptions: 2
- Stats at Pro Football Reference

Sherman Eugene White (born October 6, 1948) is an American former professional football player who was a defensive lineman in the National Football League (NFL) from 1972 to 1983. He was selected by the Cincinnati Bengals in the first round with the second overall pick in the 1972 NFL draft out of the University of California, Berkeley.

White played four seasons with the Cincinnati Bengals, before White moved to the Buffalo Bills to replace the person whom the Bills had selected first overall in the same draft: Walt Patulski, who was mired in a squabble with Bills head coach Lou Saban. White went on to play eight seasons with the Bills before retiring.
