= Jerry Sisemore =

American football player (born 1951)

No. 76
- Position: Offensive tackle / Guard

Personal information
- Born: July 16, 1951 (age 75); Olton, Texas, U.S.
- Listed height: 6 ft 4 in (1.93 m)
- Listed weight: 265 lb (120 kg)

Career information
- High school: Plainview (Plainview, Texas)
- College: Texas
- NFL draft: 1973: 1st round, 3rd overall pick

Career history
- Philadelphia Eagles (1973–1984)

Awards and highlights
- 2× Pro Bowl (1979, 1981); Philadelphia Eagles Hall of Fame; 2× Unanimous All-American (1971, 1972); 1970 Coach's Poll national champion

Career NFL statistics
- Games played: 156
- Games started: 155
- Stats at Pro Football Reference
- College Football Hall of Fame

Jerald Grant Sisemore (born July 16, 1951) is an American former professional football player who was an offensive lineman for 12 seasons in the National Football League (NFL) for the Philadelphia Eagles from 1973 to 1984. During his time with the Eagles, he made the Pro-Bowl twice and was a starter in Super Bowl XV. He played college football for the Texas Longhorns where he was a two-time unanimous All-American and won the 1970 National Championship.

== College career ==
As a sophomore, Sisemore was a regular on the 1970 Longhorn team that built an unbeaten streak to 30 games. The next year Sisemore blossomed into one of the nation's best linemen as he had the first of two consecutive seasons (1971 and 1972) where he was both an all-conference and Unanimous All-America selection. In his 1972 senior year, Texas won its fifth consecutive Southwest Conference title and gained its fourth straight Cotton Bowl Classic bid. He was inducted to the College Football Hall of Fame in 2002.

== Professional career ==
Sisemore was the third overall pick in the first round of the 1973 NFL draft. He was an impact player with the Philadelphia Eagles, especially after the arrival of legendary coach Dick Vermeil in 1976. The Eagles gradually improved under Vermeil, and reached the NFL playoffs in 1978 and 1979, and Super Bowl XV in 1980. Sisemore was a big part of an offense that featured Philadelphia sports legends such as quarterback Ron Jaworski and running back Wilbert Montgomery. Sisemore is considered one of the greatest offensive linemen in franchise history. In addition to the Super Bowl, Sisemore played in two Pro Bowls before retiring after the 1985 season.

== Personal life ==
Sisemore moved to Lago Vista, Texas where he opened a marina on Lake Travis and became a real estate agent.

== See also ==
- List of Texas Longhorns football All-Americans
