= Maurie Daigneau =

American football player (born 1950)

Profile
- Position: Quarterback

Personal information
- Born: May 5, 1950 (age 76); Olmsted County, Minnesota, U.S.
- Listed height: 6 ft 2 in (1.88 m)
- Listed weight: 195 lb (88 kg)

Career information
- High school: John Marshall (MN)
- College: Northwestern

Career history
- Chicago Fire (1974)

Awards and highlights
- First-team All-Big Ten (1971)

Maurice Emerson Daigneau III (born May 5, 1950) is an American former football quarterback.

== Early life ==
Daigneau was born in Olmsted County, Minnesota, in 1950. He grew up in Rochester, Minnesota, and attended John Marshall High School.

== Northwestern University ==
He played college football for the Northwestern Wildcats from 1969 to 1971. In three years at Northwestern, he completed 298 of 659 passes for 4,237 yards, 23 touchdowns, and 53 interceptions. As a senior in 1971, he led the Big Ten Conference with 1,733 passing yards (a Northwestern school record) and led the 1971 Northwestern Wildcats football team to a victory over Ohio State and a second place finish in the Big Ten. Daignau was selected by the Associated Press and the United Press International as a first-team player on the 1971 All-Big Ten Conference football team.

== World Football League ==
In 1974, he played for the Chicago Fire (WFL) in the newly-formed World Football League and appeared in 12 games. He then signed with the Chicago Winds in July 1975, and later with the Milwaukee County Spartans of the Central States Football League.
