= Rufus Ferguson =

American gridiron football player (born 1951)

Profile
- Position: Running back

Personal information
- Born: April 28, 1951 (age 75); Miami, Florida, U.S.
- Listed height: 5 ft 5.5 in (1.66 m)
- Listed weight: 190 lb (86 kg)

Career information
- High school: Miami Killian (Kendall, Florida)
- College: Wisconsin (1970–1972)
- NFL draft: 1973: 16th round, 404th overall pick

Career history
- Atlanta Falcons (1973)*; Winnipeg Blue Bombers (1973); Portland Storm (1974); Portland Thunder (1975)
- * Offseason or practice squad member only

Awards and highlights
- 2× First-team All-Big Ten (1971, 1972)

Rufus Ferguson (born April 28, 1951), nicknamed "the Roadrunner", is an American former football running back.

== Early life ==
Ferguson was born in Miami, Florida, in 1951 and played high school football at Miami Killian High School.

== University of Wisconsin ==
Ferguson played college football for the Wisconsin Badgers from 1970 to 1972. Rufus Ferguson was the first regular season 1000 Yard Rusher for the University of Wisconsin. He set a Wisconsin career record with 2,814 rushing yards. (His career rushing record was broken by Billy Marek in 1975.) As a junior, he rushed for 1,222 yards and was selected by both the Associated Press (AP) and United Press International (UPI) as a first-team running back on the 1971 All-Big Ten Conference football team. As a senior, he rushed for 1,004 yards and was selected by the AP as a first-team player and by the UPI as a second-team player on the 1972 All-Big Ten Conference football team. He received a degree in economics from the University of Wisconsin in June 1973.

== Professional football ==
He was selected 404th overall by the Atlanta Falcons in the 16th round of the 1973 NFL draft, but he was cut during the preseason, after being deemed too short (listed as either five feet, four inches five feet, five inches, or five feet, six inches) for the NFL.

He signed with the Winnipeg Blue Bombers of the Canadian Football League in September 1973, but he was cut by the team later that month.

Ferguson was drafted by the Portland Storm of the newly-formed World Football League. During the 1974 WFL season, Ferguson ranked fourth in the league in rushing with 1,200 yards and led the Storm with 53 pass receptions.

In June 1975, he signed with the Portland Thunder (WFL). When the WFL folded prior to the end of the 1975 season, Ferguson was the Thunder's leading rusher with 768 yards and also had 32 receptions. He became known in during his Wisconsin career and later with Portland for his touchdown dance that was known as either the “Rufus Shuffle” with the Badgers and then the "Roadrunner Shuffle" or the "Thunderbolt Shuffle" with the Thunderbolt.

== Later life ==
Ferguson's son, Rhadi Ferguson, was born in 1975 and became a martial arts champion.
