= J. Edward Weaver =

American college athletics administrator (1927–1994)

Biographical details
- Born: December 13, 1910; Marysville, Ohio, U.S.
- Died: May 23, 2001 (aged 90); Columbus, Ohio, U.S.

Playing career

Football
- 1930–1932: Ohio State
- Position: End

Administrative career (AD unless noted)
- 1950–1953: Ohio State (asst. AD)
- 1957–1970: Ohio State (asso. AD)
- 1970–1977: Ohio State

Jonathan Edward Weaver (December 13, 1910 – May 23, 2001) was an American college athletics administrator who was the athletic director at Ohio State University from 1970 to 1977.

== Early life ==
A native of Marysville, Ohio, Weaver graduated from Lima Central Catholic High School in 1928. He attended Ohio State, where he was a member of the football and basketball teams and was president of the Phi Delta Theta fraternity. He graduated from the Ohio State University College of Arts and Sciences in 1933. Weaver worked in the finance industry in Cleveland and Akron, Ohio until World War II. He entered the United States Army in 1942 and was assigned to the Counterintelligence Corps. He left the Army in December 1945.

== Ohio State ==
Weaver began his career at OSU in 1946 as field secretary for the Alumni Association. In 1950, he became assistant athletic director and director of ticket sales. In 1953, he was appointed to the newly created position of administrative assistant to Ohio State's business manager. He returned to the athletic department in 1957 as associate athletics director.

On October 7, 1970, Weaver succeeded the retiring Dick Larkins as Ohio State's athletic director. Under his leadership, Ohio State expanded from 18 varsity sports to 30, female athletes receiving began receiving scholarships, and the Ohio State Sports Network was founded. He also played an instrumental role in the creation of the Ohio State Varsity O Hall of Fame. He retired on April 30, 1977, and was succeeded by associate AD Hugh Hindman.

== Later life ==
Weaver was inducted into the Ohio State Varsity O Hall of Fame in 1993. He died on May 23, 2001, at the Ohio State University Medical Center.
