= Tom DeLeone =

American football player (1950–2016)

No. 50, 54
- Position: Center

Personal information
- Born: August 13, 1950; Ravenna, Ohio, U.S.
- Died: May 22, 2016 (aged 65); Park City, Utah, U.S.
- Listed height: 6 ft 2 in (1.88 m)
- Listed weight: 248 lb (112 kg)

Career information
- High school: Theodore Roosevelt (OH)
- College: Ohio State
- NFL draft: 1972: 5th round, 106th overall pick

Career history
- Cincinnati Bengals (1972–1973); Cleveland Browns (1974–1984)

Awards and highlights
- 2× Pro Bowl (1979, 1980); George Halas Award (1977); Cleveland Browns Legends; National champion (1970); First-team All-American (1971); 2× First-team All-Big Ten (1970, 1971)

Career NFL statistics
- Games played: 176
- Games started: 104
- Stats at Pro Football Reference

Thomas Denning DeLeone (August 13, 1950 – May 22, 2016) was an American professional football player who was a center for 13 seasons in the National Football League (NFL), with the Cleveland Browns and Cincinnati Bengals. He played college football for the Ohio State Buckeyes.

DeLeone grew up in Kent, Ohio and graduated from Theodore Roosevelt High School in 1968, where he was on the football, basketball, and track teams. He played college football at Ohio State University, where he was a starting center and an All-Big Ten and first-team All-American selection. He later went on to work as a criminal investigator with the U.S. Department of the Treasury rising to a Senior Special Agent position within the U.S. Customs Service. He worked in the US Customs Service, and he was a member of the FBI's Joint Terrorism Task Force in Salt Lake City, Utah, during the 2002 Olympic Games in Park City, Utah. In 2003, The U.S. Customs Service became a part of the newly created Department of Homeland Security and he retired from Immigration and Customs Enforcement in 2007. He is a 2002 inductee of the Ohio State University Football Hall of Fame and a 2003 inductee of the Kent City Schools Hall of Fame.

DeLeone, a key member of the 1980 Cleveland Browns Kardiac Kids, died on May 22, 2016, at his home in Park City, Utah following a five-year battle with brain cancer. He was 65. DeLeone was married, with three children. His middle child, Dean DeLeone, played football for Arizona State.

Before his death, he worked as a substitute teacher at Park City High School and Treasure Mountain International School in Park City, where he had also volunteered as an assistant coach on the football team, sharing his love of football with the young students he coached and mentored.

DeLeone was one of at least 345 NFL players to be diagnosed after death with chronic traumatic encephalopathy (CTE), which is caused by repeated hits to the head.
