= Royce Smith =

American football player (1949–2004)

No. 64, 66
- Position: Guard

Personal information
- Born: June 17, 1949; Savannah, Georgia, U.S.
- Died: January 22, 2004 (aged 54); Claxton, Georgia, U.S.
- Listed height: 6 ft 3 in (1.91 m)
- Listed weight: 250 lb (113 kg)

Career information
- High school: Savannah (GA) Groves
- College: Georgia
- NFL draft: 1972: 1st round, 8th overall pick

Career history
- New Orleans Saints (1972–1973); Atlanta Falcons (1974–1976)

Awards and highlights
- Unanimous All-American (1971); Jacobs Blocking Trophy (1971); 2× First-team All-SEC (1970, 1971)
- Stats at Pro Football Reference

Royce Lionel Smith (June 17, 1949 – January 22, 2004) was an American professional football player who was a guard for five seasons in the National Football League (NFL). He was selected by the New Orleans Saints in the first round (8th overall) of the 1972 NFL draft. He appeared in most games during these seasons but was unable to force his way into the starting lineup.
