= 1971 All-America college football team =

Official list of the best college football players of 1971

The 1971 All-America college football team is composed of college football players who were selected as All-Americans by various organizations and writers that chose College Football All-America Teams in 1971. The National Collegiate Athletic Association (NCAA) recognizes five selectors as "official" for the 1971 season. They are: (1) the American Football Coaches Association (AFCA), (2) the Associated Press (AP), (3) the Football Writers Association of America (FWAA), (4) the Newspaper Enterprise Association (NEA), and (5) the United Press International (UPI).

Nine players are recognized by the NCAA as unanimous All-America selections: quarterback and 1971 Heisman Trophy winner Pat Sullivan of Auburn; running backs Ed Marinaro of Cornell and Greg Pruitt of Oklahoma; receiver Terry Beasley of Auburn; tackle Jerry Sisemore of Texas; guard Royce Smith of Georgia; defensive end Walt Patulski of Notre Dame; linebacker Mike Taylor of Michigan; and defensive back Bobby Majors of Tennessee.

== Consensus All-Americans ==
The following chart identifies the NCAA-recognized consensus All-Americans for the year 1971 and displays which first-team designations they received.

Name	Position	School	Number	Official	Other
Terry Beasley	Receiver	Auburn	5/4/9	AFCA, AP, FWAA, NEA, UPI	FN, Time, TSN, WC
Bobby Majors	Defensive back	Tennessee	5/4/9	AFCA, AP, FWAA, NEA, UPI	FN, Time, TSN, WC
Walt Patulski	Defensive end	Notre Dame	5/4/9	AFCA, AP, FWAA, NEA, UPI	FN, Time, TSN, WC
Royce Smith	Offensive guard	Georgia	5/4/9	AFCA, AP, FWAA, NEA, UPI	FN, Time, TSN, WC
Mike Taylor	Linebacker	Michigan	5/4/9	AFCA, AP, FWAA, NEA, UPI	FN, Time, TSN, WC
Ed Marinaro	Running back	Cornell	5/3/8	AFCA, AP, FWAA, NEA, UPI	FN, Time, TSN
Pat Sullivan	Quarterback	Auburn	5/3/8	AFCA, AP, FWAA, NEA, UPI	FN, TSN, WC
Clarence Ellis	Defensive back	Notre Dame	4/4/8	AFCA, AP, NEA, UPI	FN, Time, TSN, WC
Reggie McKenzie	Offensive guard	Michigan	4/4/8	AP, FWAA, NEA, UPI	FN, Time, TSN, WC
Greg Pruitt	Running back	Oklahoma	5/2/7	AFCA, AP, FWAA, NEA, UPI	FN, WC
Jerry Sisemore	Offensive tackle	Texas	5/2/7	AFCA, AP, FWAA, NEA, UPI	FN, WC
Sherman White	Defensive tackle	California	3/4/7	AFCA, FWAA, NEA	FN, Time, TSN, WC
Johnny Rodgers	Receiver	Nebraska	4/2/6	AFCA, FWAA, NEA, UPI	FN, WC
Jeff Siemon	Linebacker	Stanford	4/2/6	AFCA, AP, FWAA, UPI	FN, Time
Larry Jacobson	Defensive tackle	Nebraska	4/1/5	AFCA, AP, FWAA, UPI	Time
Tom Brahaney	Center	Oklahoma	3/2/5	AFCA, AP, FWAA	FN, WC
Dave Joyner	Offensive tackle	Penn State	3/2/5	AFCA, FWAA, UPI	FN, WC
Johnny Musso	Running back	Alabama	3/2/5	AFCA, FWAA, UPI	FN, WC
Tommy Casanova	Defensive back	LSU	2/3/5	FWAA, UPI	FN, Time, WC
Mel Long	Defensive tackle	Toledo	4/0/4	AP, FWAA, NEA, UPI	--
Willie Harper	Defensive end	Nebraska	2/2/4	NEA, UPI	FN, WC
Ernie Jackson	Defensive back	Duke	2/0/2	AFCA, FWAA	--

== Offense ==
=== Receivers ===
- Terry Beasley, Auburn (AFCA, AP-1, FWAA, NEA-1, UPI-1, FN, Time, TSN, WC)
- Johnny Rodgers, Nebraska (AFCA, AP-2, FWAA, NEA-1, UPI-1, FN, WC)
- Mike Siani, Villanova (NEA-2, UPI-2, TSN)
- Tom Gatewood, Notre Dame (UPI-2, Time)
- Cliff Branch, Colorado (FN)
- Rhett Dawson, Florida State (AP-3)

=== Tight ends ===
- Riley Odoms, Houston (AP-3, NEA-2 [receiver], Time, TSN)
- Doug Kingsriter, Minnesota (AP-1)
- Charle Young, USC (AP-2)

=== Tackles ===
- Jerry Sisemore, Texas (AFCA, AP-1, FWAA, NEA-1, UPI-1, FN, WC)
- Dave Joyner, Penn State (AFCA, AP-2, FWAA, NEA-2, UPI-1, FN, WC)
- John Vella, USC (AP-1, NEA-1, UPI-2, FN, TSN)
- John Hannah, Alabama (AFCA, AP-2, UPI-2)
- Tom Drougas, Oregon (TSN)
- Lionel Antoine, Southern Illinois (Time)
- Tom Luken, Purdue (AP-2, NEA-2 [OG])
- Carl Johnson, Nebraska (AP-3)
- Mike Stark, Memphis State (AP-3)

=== Guards ===
- Reggie McKenzie, Michigan (AP-1, FWAA, NEA-1, UPI-1, FN, Time, TSN, WC)
- Royce Smith, Georgia (AFCA, AP-1, FWAA, NEA-1, UPI-1, FN, Time, TSN, WC)
- Gordon Gravelle, BYU (AP-2, NEA-2)
- Dick Rupert, Nebraska (AP-3, UPI-2)
- B. C. Williams, West Virginia (AP-3)
- Ken Jones, Oklahoma (UPI-2)

=== Centers ===
- Tom Brahaney, Oklahoma (AFCA, AP-1, FWAA, UPI-2, FN, WC)
- Tom DeLeone, Ohio State (AP-2, NEA-1, UPI-1, FN, Time, TSN)
- Dave Dalby, UCLA (AP-3, NEA-2, TSN)

=== Quarterbacks ===
- Pat Sullivan, Auburn (AFCA, AP-1, FWAA, NEA-1, UPI-1, FN, TSN, WC)
- Chuck Ealey, Toledo, (AP-3, FWAA, UPI-2, FN)
- Jerry Tagge, Nebraska (AP-2, FN)
- Jack Mildren, Oklahoma (NEA-2, FN)
- John Reaves, Florida (Time)

=== Running backs ===
- Ed Marinaro, Cornell (AFCA, AP-1, FWAA, NEA-1, UPI-1, FN, Time, TSN)
- Greg Pruitt, Oklahoma (AFCA, AP-1, FWAA, NEA-1, UPI-1, FN, WC)
- Johnny Musso, Alabama (AFCA, AP-2, FWAA, NEA-2, UPI-1, FN, WC)
- Ahmad Rashad (born Bobby Moore), Oregon (AP-3, NEA-1, UPI-2, FN, Time, TSN)
- Lydell Mitchell, Penn State (AP-1, NEA-2, UPI-2, FN)
- Eric Allen, Michigan State (AFCA, AP-2, NEA-2)
- Billy Taylor, Michigan (AP-3, UPI-2, FN)
- Robert Newhouse, Houston (AP-2)
- Jeff Kinney, Nebraska (AP-3)

== Defense ==
=== Defensive ends ===
- Walt Patulski, Notre Dame (AFCA, AP-1, FWAA, NEA-1, UPI-1, FN, Time, TSN, WC)
- Willie Harper, Nebraska (AP-2, NEA-1, UPI-1, FN, WC)
- Smylie Gebhart, Georgia Tech (AP-1)
- Robin Parkhouse, Alabama (AP-2, NEA-2, UPI-2)
- Junior Ah You, Arizona State (UPI-2)
- Mike Keller, Michigan (AP-3)
- Gene Ogilvie, Air Force (AP-3)

=== Defensive tackles ===
- Larry Jacobson, Nebraska (AFCA, AP-1, FWAA, NEA-2 [OT], UPI-1, Time)
- Mel Long, Toledo (AP-1, FWAA, NEA-1, UPI-1)
- Sherman White, California (AFCA, AP-2, FWAA, NEA-1, FN, Time, TSN, WC)
- Herb Orvis, Colorado (AFCA, AP-3, NEA-2 [DE], UPI-2, TSN [DE], WC)
- Mike Kadish, Notre Dame (Time, TSN)
- Ron Estay, LSU (AFCA [guard], AP-2, NEA-2 [MG], UPI-2)
- Pete Lazetich, Stanford (NEA-2, FN)

=== Middle guards ===
- Rich Glover, Nebraska (AP-1, NEA-1, WC)
- Ron Curl, Michigan State (AFCA, AP-3, NEA-2)
- Doug Krause, Miami (OH) (AP-2)
- Bud Magrum, Colorado (AP-3)

=== Linebackers ===
- Mike Taylor, Michigan (AFCA, AP-1, FWAA, NEA-1, UPI-1, FN, Time, TSN, WC)
- Jeff Siemon, Stanford (AFCA, AP-1, FWAA, UPI-1, FN, Time)
- Jackie Walker, Tennessee (FWAA, NEA-2, UPI-1, FN, WC)
- Dave Chaney, San Jose State (AP-1, NEA-1, UPI-2)
- Willie Hall, Southern California (AP-2, UPI-2, Time, TSN, FN)
- Chuck Zapiec, Penn State (AP-3, NEA-1)
- Mark Arneson, Arizona (TSN)
- Rodrigo Barnes, Rice (UPI-2)
- Ralph Cindrich, Pittsburgh (AP-2, NEA-2)
- Joe Federspiel, Kentucky (AP-2)
- Steve Aycock, Oklahoma (UPI-2)
- Bill Light, Minnesota (AP-3)
- Harold Sears, Miami (FL) (AP-3)

=== Defensive backs ===
- Bobby Majors, Tennessee (AFCA, AP-1, FWAA, NEA-1, UPI-1, FN, Time, TSN, WC)
- Clarence Ellis, Notre Dame (AFCA, AP-1, NEA-1, UPI-1, FN, Time, TSN, WC)
- Tommy Casanova, LSU (FWAA, UPI-1, FN, Time, WC)
- Ernie Jackson, Duke (AFCA, AP-2, FWAA)
- Brad Van Pelt, Michigan State (AP-3, UPI-1, FN)
- Willie Buchanon, San Diego State (NEA-2, Time, TSN)
- Thom Darden, Michigan (AFCA, AP-2, UPI-2, TSN)
- Eric Hutchinson, Northwestern (FWAA, NEA-2, UPI-2)
- Dickie Harris, South Carolina (UPI-2, WC)
- Craig Clemons, Iowa (NEA-1, TSN)
- Windlan Hall, Arizona State (AP-3, NEA-2 [LB], UPI-2, FN)
- Tom Myers, Syracuse (AP-1)
- Robert Popelka, SMU (AP-2)
- Ralph McGill, Tulsa (AP-3, NEA-2)

== Special teams ==
=== Kickers ===
- Bill McClard, Arkansas (FWAA TSN)
- Chester Marcol, Hillsdale College (Time)

=== Punters ===
- Marv Bateman, Utah (TSN, Time)

== Key ==
- **Bold** – Consensus All-American
- -1 – First-team selection
- -2 – Second-team selection
- -3 – Third-team selection

=== Official selectors ===
- AFCA – American Football Coaches Association for Kodak
- AP – Associated Press
- FWAA – Football Writers Association of America
- NEA – Newspaper Enterprise Association
- UPI – United Press International

=== Other selectors ===
- FN – Football News
- Time – Time magazine
- TSN – The Sporting News
- PFW – Pro Football Weekly
- WC – Walter Camp Football Foundation

== See also ==
- 1971 All-Atlantic Coast Conference football team
- 1971 All-Big Eight Conference football team
- 1971 All-Big Ten Conference football team
- 1971 All-Pacific-8 Conference football team
- 1971 All-SEC football team
- 1971 All-Southwest Conference football team
