= Eric Allen (wide receiver) =

American football player (1949–2015)

Profile
- Positions: Halfback, Split end

Personal information
- Born: May 18, 1949; Georgetown, South Carolina, U.S.
- Died: October 27, 2015 (aged 66); Georgetown, South Carolina, U.S.
- Listed height: 5 ft 10 in (1.78 m)
- Listed weight: 162 lb (73 kg)

Career information
- High school: Howard (Georgetown)
- College: Michigan State
- NFL draft: 1972: 4th round, 104th overall pick

Career history
- 1972–1975: Toronto Argonauts

Awards and highlights
- Eastern All-Star team (1972, 1973); First-team All-American (1971); Chicago Tribune Silver Football (1971); First-team All-Big Ten (1971); Second-team All-Big Ten (1970)

Career NFL statistics
- Receptions: 130
- Receiving yards: 2,401
- Touchdowns: 16

Eric Benjamin Allen (May 18, 1949 – October 27, 2015) was an American football player. He played college football for the Michigan State Spartans from 1969 to 1971 and professionally for the Toronto Argonauts of the Canadian Football League (CFL) from 1972 to 1975.

A 1968 graduate of Howard High School in Georgetown, South Carolina, Allen gained over 3,000 combined rushing and passing yards for Michigan State. On October 30, 1971, Allen set an NCAA single-game record with 350 rushing yards on 29 carries in a 43-10 win over Purdue. He broke the prior record of 347 yards set by Ron Johnson of Michigan in 1968. During the 1971 season, Allen led the Big Ten Conference in both rushing yardage (1,410), yards from scrimmage (1,769), rushing yards per carry (5.8), and touchdowns (18). He was the first Big Ten player to score more than 100 points in a season. Allen finished 10th in the Heisman Trophy voting in 1971.

Allen was drafted by the Baltimore Colts in the fourth round of the 1972 NFL draft. He did not sign and played in the CFL for the Toronto Argonauts. During his rookie year with the Argonauts, he caught 53 passes for 1,067 yards and eight touchdowns. He also gained 220 rushing yards on 50 carries during the 1972 season.

Allen died in hospice care at his hometown on October 27, 2015.

== Career statistics ==
			Receiving					Rushing					Punt returns					Kick returns					Misc	
Year	Team	GP	Rec	Yds	Avg	Long	TD	Att	Yds	Avg	Long	TD	PR	Yds	Avg	Long	TD	KR	Yds	Avg	Long	TD	FUM	FR
1972	TOR	14	50	1,067	20.1	62	8	50	220	4.4	14	0	3	15	5.0	8	0	18	405	22.5	46	0	1	0
1973	TOR	14	40	797	19.9	100	4	19	52	2.7	14	0	6	56	9.3	18	0	16	442	27.6	78	0	4	1
1974	TOR	7	18	281	15.6	48	3	0	0	0.0	0	0	0	0	0	0	0	2	39	19.5	20	0	1	0
1975	TOR	9	19	256	13.5	46	1	14	51	3.6	9	0	1	24	24.0	24	0	24	565	23.5	44	0	1	1
Total		44	130	2,401	18.5	100	16	83	323	3.9	14	0	10	95	9.5	24	0	60	1,451	24.2	78	0	7	2
