= Craig Clemons =

American football player (born 1949)

No. 45, 25, 43
- Position: Safety

Personal information
- Born: June 1, 1949 (age 77); Sidney, Ohio, U.S.
- Listed height: 5 ft 11 in (1.80 m)
- Listed weight: 195 lb (88 kg)

Career information
- High school: Piqua (OH)
- College: Iowa
- NFL draft: 1972: 1st round, 12th overall pick

Career history
- Chicago Bears (1972–1977)

Awards and highlights
- First-team All-American (1971); First-team All-Big Ten (1971); 2× Second-team All-Big Ten (1969, 1970)

Career NFL statistics
- Interceptions: 9
- INT yards: 251
- Touchdowns: 1
- Stats at Pro Football Reference

Craig Clemons (born June 1, 1949) is an American former professional football player who was a safety in the National Football League (NFL). He was selected in the first round by the Chicago Bears 12th overall in the 1972 NFL draft. He played college football for the Iowa Hawkeyes. After the 1971 college football season Clemons earned First-team All-American and First-team All-Big Ten honors.
