= Mike Taylor (linebacker, born 1949) =

American football player (born 1949)

No. 50
- Position: Linebacker

Personal information
- Born: September 21, 1949 (age 77); Detroit, Michigan, U.S.
- Listed height: 6 ft 1 in (1.85 m)
- Listed weight: 230 lb (104 kg)

Career information
- High school: Martin Luther King (MI)
- College: Michigan
- NFL draft: 1972: 1st round, 20th overall pick

Career history
- New York Jets (1972–1973); Detroit Wheels (1974)

Awards and highlights
- Unanimous All-American (1971); First-team All-Big Ten (1971)

Career NFL statistics
- Games played: 22
- Interceptions: 1
- Touchdowns: 0
- Stats at Pro Football Reference

Michael Taylor (born September 21, 1949) is an American former professional football player who was a linebacker in the National Football League (NFL). He played college football at the University of Michigan from 1969 to 1971 and was a consensus All-American in 1971. He played two seasons in the National Football League (NFL) for the New York Jets in 1972 and 1973. He also played for the Detroit Wheels in the World Football League in 1974.

== Early life ==
Taylor was born in Detroit, Michigan, in 1949. He attended Martin Luther King High School in Detroit.

== University of Michigan ==
Taylor enrolled at the University of Michigan in 1968 and played college football for head coach Bo Schembechler's Michigan Wolverines football teams from 1969 to 1971.

He made 117 tackles and 63 assists in three years at Michigan, including 64 tackles and 33 assists in 1971. He was a consensus first-team linebacker on the 1971 College Football All-America Team. In 2005, Taylor was selected as one of the 100 greatest Michigan football players of all time by the "Motown Sports Revival," ranking 89th on the all-time team.

== Professional football ==
Taylor was selected by the New York Jets in the first round (20th overall pick) of the 1972 NFL draft. During the 1972 New York Jets season, Taylor appeared as a linebacker in 14 games, five as a starter, and had one interception.

In 1973, Taylor appeared in eight games, three as a starter, for the Jets. In March 1974, he was selected by the Detroit Wheels in the first round (6th overall) of the WFL Pro Draft. In May 1974, Taylor signed a multi-year contract with the Wheels of the World Football League. The Wheels' head coach, Dan Boisture, said Taylor would be "the focal point of our defense."

== See also ==
- Michigan Wolverines Football All-Americans
