= Doug Kingsriter =

American football player (born 1950)

No. 89
- Position: Tight end

Personal information
- Born: January 29, 1950 (age 76); Little Falls, Minnesota, U.S.
- Listed height: 6 ft 2 in (1.88 m)
- Listed weight: 222 lb (101 kg)

Career information
- High school: Richfield (Richfield, Minnesota)
- College: Minnesota
- NFL draft: 1973: 6th round, 139th overall pick

Career history
- Minnesota Vikings (1973–1975)

Awards and highlights
- First-team All-American (1971); First-team All-Big Ten (1971)

Career NFL statistics
- Receptions: 7
- Receiving yards: 116
- Stats at Pro Football Reference

Douglas James Kingsriter (born January 29, 1950) is an American former professional football player who was a tight end three seasons with the Minnesota Vikings in the National Football League (NFL) from 1973 to 1975. He finished his NFL career with 7 receptions for 116 yards in 28 games. He played in Super Bowl VIII and Super Bowl IX for the Vikings In Super Bowl VIII he caught one pass for seven yards and also made a key block on Fran Tarkenton's run for the Vikings' only touchdown.

He played college football for the Minnesota Golden Gophers. He was named a first-team All-American by the Associated Press in 1971. He was selected by the Vikings in the sixth round of the 1973 NFL draft.

After football, Kingsriter went into the real estate business and later into publishing books and musicals for children. He also worked for the Lance Armstrong Foundation and the Minneapolis Heart Institute Foundation.
