= 1971 Philadelphia Eagles season =

NFL team season

- Owner: Leonard Tose
- Head coach: Jerry Williams; Ed Khayat
- Home stadium: Veterans Stadium

Results
- Record: 6–7–1
- Division place: 3rd NFC East
- Playoffs: Did not qualify
- Pro Bowlers: S Bill Bradley

The 1971 Philadelphia Eagles season was their 39th in the National Football League. They improved on their previous output of 3–10–1, winning six games. Despite the improvement, the team failed to qualify for the playoffs for the eleventh consecutive season. This was the team's inaugural season in Veterans Stadium.

After the Eagles lost their first three games of the season, head coach Jerry Williams was fired and replaced by Ed Khayat.

== Offseason ==
=== NFL draft ===
The table shows the Eagles' selections and what picks they had that were traded away and the team that ended up with that pick. It is possible the Eagles' pick ended up with this team via another team that the Eagles made a trade with. Not shown are acquired picks that the Eagles traded away.

= Pro Bowler	= Hall of Famer

Rd	Pick	Player	Pos.	College
1	5	Richard Harris	Defensive End	Grambling
2	30	_{Pick Taken By; Detroit Lions}		
2	50	Hank Allison_{Acquired Minn Vikings Pick}	Guard	San Diego State
3	55	_{Pick Taken By; San Francisco 49ers}		
4	83	Happy Feller	Kicker	Texas
5	108	Tom Shellabarger	Tackle	San Diego State
6	133	Jack Smith	Defensive back	Troy State
6	154	Wyck Neely	Defensive back	Mississippi
7	161	Harold Carmichael	Wide receiver	Southern
8	186	Leonard Gotschalk	Center	Humboldt State
9	211	Len Pettigrew	Linebacker	Ashland
10	239	_{Pick Taken By; New Orleans Saints}		
10	256	Tom Bailey	Running back	Florida State
11	264	Albert Davis	Running back	Tennessee State
12	289	Rich Saathoff	Defensive end	Northern Arizona
13	317	Danny Lester	Defensive back	Texas
14	342	Robert Creech	Linebacker	Texas Christian
15	367	Ed Fisher	Guard	Prairie View A&M
16	395	Bruce James	Linebacker	Arkansas
17	420	John Sage	Linebacker	Louisiana State

== Personnel ==
=== Staff / Coaches ===
1971 Philadelphia Eagles staff
Front office: Owner – Leonard Tose; General manager – Pete Retzlaff; Head coaches: Head coach - Jerry Williams (0-3, fired); Head coach – Ed Khayat (Interim, 6-4-1); Offensive coaches: Offensive Coordinator - Tom Fears; Quarterbacks - John Rauch; Running Backs – Jack Zilly; Offensive Line – Brad Ecklund	Defensive coaches: Defensive Coordinator – Walt Michaels; Defensive Line - Ed Khayat; Defensive Line – Jesse Richardson; Defensive Line - Joe Moss; Linebackers - Jim Carr; Special teams coaches: Special Teams Assistant – Jack Zilly

=== Roster ===
1971 Philadelphia Eagles roster
Quarterbacks (QB): 11 Rick Arrington; 14 Pete Liske; 7 Jim Ward; Running backs (RB): 38 Tony Baker; 46 Lee Bouggess; 47 Ronnie Bull; 43 Sonny Davis; 34 Larry Watkins; 37 Tom Woodeshick; Wide receivers (WR): 18 Ben Hawkins; 29 Harold Jackson; 9 Billy Walik; Tight ends (TE): 86 Fred Hill; 87 Kent Kramer	Offensive linemen (OL): 61 Hank Allison G; 59 Mike Evans C; 72 Wade Key T; 68 Mark Nordquist G; 70 Jim Skaggs G; 74 Steve Smith T; 73 Dick Stevens T; Defensive linemen (DL): 80 Don Brumm DE; 77 Ernie Calloway DT/DE; 84 Richard Harris DE; 73 Don Hultz DT; 88 Gary Pettigrew DT; 99 Mel Tom DE	Linebackers (LB): 56 Bill Hobbs OLB; 51 Ike Kelley MLB; 50 Ron Porter OLB; 82 Tim Rossovich MLB; 89 Steve Zabel OLB; Defensive backs (DB): 28 Bill Bradley FS; 20 Leroy Keyes SS; 26 Al Nelson CB; 24 Nate Ramsey CB; 32 Jack Smith CB; 49 Jim Thrower CB; Special teams (ST): 19 Tom Dempsey K; 36 Tom McNeill P	Practice squad: 31 Tom Bailey RB; 58 Bob Creech LB; 62 Mike Dirks DT; 5 Happy Feller K; 33 Steve Preece S; 81 Jim Whalen TE; Reserve: 85 Gary Ballman TE (IR); 17 Harold Carmichael WR (IR); 71 Dick Hart G (IR); 21 Joe Scarpati S (IR); 35 Adrian Young LB (IR); Rookies in italics

== Schedule ==
Week	Date	Opponent	Result	Record	Venue	Attendance
1	September 19	at Cincinnati Bengals	**L** 14–37	0–1	Riverfront Stadium	55,880
2	September 26	**Dallas Cowboys**	**L** 7–42	0–2	Veterans Stadium	65,358
3	October 3	San Francisco 49ers	**L** 3–31	0–3	Veterans Stadium	65,358
4	October 10	Minnesota Vikings	**L** 0–13	0–4	Veterans Stadium	65,358
5	October 17	at Oakland Raiders	**L** 10–34	0–5	Oakland–Alameda County Coliseum	54,615
6	October 24	**New York Giants**	**W** 23–7	1–5	Veterans Stadium	65,358
7	October 31	Denver Broncos	**W** 17–16	2–5	Veterans Stadium	65,358
8	November 7	at **Washington Redskins**	**T** 7–7	2–5–1	RFK Stadium	53,041
9	November 14	at **Dallas Cowboys**	**L** 7–20	2–6–1	Texas Stadium	60,178
10	November 21	at **St. Louis Cardinals**	**W** 37–20	3–6–1	Busch Memorial Stadium	48,658
11	November 28	**Washington Redskins**	**L** 13–20	3–7–1	Veterans Stadium	65,358
12	December 5	at Detroit Lions	**W** 23–20	4–7–1	Tiger Stadium	54,418
13	December 12	**St. Louis Cardinals**	**W** 19–7	5–7–1	Veterans Stadium	65,358
14	December 19	at **New York Giants**	**W** 41–28	6–7–1	Yankee Stadium	62,774

Note: Intra-division opponents are in bold text.

=== Standings ===
NFC East
	W	L	T	PCT	DIV	CONF	PF	PA	STK
Dallas Cowboys	11	3	0	.786	7–1	8–3	406	222	W7
Washington Redskins	9	4	1	.692	6–1–1	8–2–1	276	190	L1
Philadelphia Eagles	6	7	1	.462	4–3–1	5–5–1	221	302	W3
St. Louis Cardinals	4	9	1	.308	1–7	2–8–1	231	279	L2
New York Giants	4	10	0	.286	1–7	3–8	228	362	L5

Note: Tie games were not officially counted in the standings until 1972.

== Awards and honors ==
Records Breakers

- Al Nelson 102 yard missed field goal return, Eagles vs Dallas on September 26, 1971

Pro Bowl

- Bill Bradley named Pro Bowl starter

League leaders

- Bill Bradley leads league with 11 interceptions.
