= 1972 Philadelphia Eagles season =

NFL team season

- Owner: Leonard Tose
- General manager: Pete Retzlaff
- Head coach: Ed Khayat
- Home stadium: Veterans Stadium

Results
- Record: 2–11–1
- Division place: 5th NFC East
- Playoffs: Did not qualify
- Pro Bowlers: WR Harold Jackson; S Bill Bradley

The 1972 Philadelphia Eagles season was the franchise's 40th season in the National Football League. They failed to improve and declined on their previous output of 6–7–1, winning only two games and scoring the fewest points in the league (145). The team failed to qualify for the playoffs for the twelfth consecutive season.

Both of the Eagles' victories were one-point decisions on the road vs. AFC teams, 21–20 over the Kansas City Chiefs and 18–17 over the Houston Oilers, a victory which ultimately cost the Eagles the #1 selection in the 1973 NFL draft. The meeting with the Chiefs was the last until 1992, and Kansas City did not come to Philadelphia until 1998. The Eagles failed to win a game at home during the season, the first and to date only time they've gone winless at home.

Following the disastrous season, the third with three wins or fewer since 1968, general manager Pete Retzlaff resigned and coach Ed Khayat was fired by owner Leonard Tose. This would be the last time the Eagles failed to win a divisional game until 2005.

== Offseason ==
The Eagles held training camp at Albright College in Reading, Pennsylvania. This was their last year there. The next year, they moved camp to Widener University in Chester, Pennsylvania, only 7 miles from Veterans Stadium where they played their home games in Philadelphia.

=== NFL draft ===
The 1972 NFL draft was held on February 1–2, 1972. The draft was 17 rounds and a total of 443 players were chosen.

The Eagles chose John Reaves, a quarterback from the University of Florida, with the 14th pick in the 1st round. They had the 14th pick in each of the 17 rounds. They chose 17 players in this year's draft.

The number 1 overall pick went to the Buffalo Bills, who chose Walt Patulski, a defensive end out of the University of Notre Dame. In the 2nd round with the 40th pick, the Atlanta Falcons took 1971 Heisman Trophy winner Pat Sullivan, a quarterback out of Auburn University

=== Player selections ===
The table shows the Eagles' selections and which picks they had that were traded away and the teams that ended up with those picks. It is possible the Eagles' pick ended up with this team via another team that the Eagles made a trade with. Not shown are acquired picks that the Eagles traded away.

= Pro Bowler	= Hall of Famer

Rd	Pick	Player	Position	School
1	14	John Reaves	Quarterback	Florida
2	37	Dan Yochum _{Acquired Pick via Trade}	Tackle	Syracuse
2	40	_{Pick taken by Atlanta Falcons}		
3	66	_{Pick taken by New York Jets}		
3	68	Tom Luken _{Acquired Pick via Trade}	Guard	Purdue
3	76	Bobby Majors	Defensive back	Tennessee
4	92	Po James	Running back	New Mexico State
5	118	_{Pick taken by Denver Broncos}		
6	144	Vernon Winfield	Guard	Minnesota
7	170	Will Foster	Linebacker	Eastern Michigan
8	196	Larry Ratcliff	Running back	Eastern Michigan
9	222	Pat Gibbs	Defensive back	Lamar University
10	246	John Bunting	Linebacker	North Carolina
11	274	Dennis Sweeney	Defensive end	Western Michigan
12	300	Don Zimmerman	Wide receiver	N.E. Louisiana
13	326	Preston Carpenter	Defensive end	Mississippi
14	352	Bill Overmeyer	Linebacker	Ashland
15	378	Tom Sullivan	Running back	Miami (FL)
16	404	Steve Bielenberg	Linebacker	Oregon State
17	430	Tom Nash	Tackle	Georgia

=== Staff / Coaches ===
1972 Philadelphia Eagles staff
Front office: Owner – Leonard Tose; General manager – Pete Retzlaff; Head coaches: Head coach – Ed Khayat; Offensive coaches: Offensive Coordinator - Tom Fears; Offensive backfield - John Rauch; Offensive Line – Brad Ecklund	Defensive coaches: Defensive Coordinator – Walt Michaels; Defensive Line – Jess Richardson; Linebackers - Joe Moss; Defensive Backs - Jim Carr; Special teams coaches: Special Teams Assistant – Joe Moss

=== Roster ===
1972 Philadelphia Eagles roster
Quarterbacks (QB): 11 Rick Arrington; 14 Pete Liske; 6 John Reaves; Running backs (RB): 31 Tom Bailey; 38 Tony Baker; 27 Po James; 25 Tom Sullivan; 34 Larry Watkins; Wide receivers (WR): 17 Harold Carmichael; 18 Ben Hawkins; 29 Harold Jackson; 9 Billy Walik; 16 Don Zimmerman; Tight ends (TE): 80 Clark Hoss; 89 Kent Kramer	Offensive linemen (OL): 59 Mike Evans C; 72 Wade Key T; 63 Tom Luken G; 78 Wayne Mass T; 68 Mark Nordquist G; 70 Jim Skaggs G; 74 Steve Smith T; 55 Jerry Sturm C; 65 Mike Taylor T; 67 Vernon Winfield G; Defensive linemen (DL): 75 Houston Antwine DT; 81 Larry Estes DE; 84 Richard Harris DE; 83 Don Hultz DT; 88 Gary Pettigrew DT; 99 Mel Tom DE	Linebackers (LB): 53 Dick Absher MLB; 54 Chuck Allen MLB; 95 John Bunting OLB; 66 Bill Cody OLB; 58 Bob Creech OLB; 56 Bill Overmyer OLB; 50 Ron Porter OLB; 96 John Sodaski OLB; Defensive backs (DB): 39 Kermit Alexander SS; 21 Jackie Allen CB; 28 Bill Bradley FS/P; 8 Al Coleman FS; 20 Leroy Keyes SS; 26 Al Nelson CB; 24 Nate Ramsey CB; Special teams (ST): 19 Tom Dempsey K	Reserve: 85 Gary Ballman TE (IR); 46 Lee Bouggess RB (IR); 77 Ernie Calloway DT (IR); 47 Larry Crowe RB (IR); 43 Sonny Davis RB (IR); 45 Pat Gibbs CB (IR); 51 Ike Kelley LB (IR); -- Jim Maxwell QB (IR); 36 Tom McNeill P (IR); 73 Dick Stevens T (IR); 89 Steve Zabel LB (IR); Rookies in italics

== Regular season ==
On November 12, Tom Dempsey kicked six field goals in one game.

=== Schedule ===
Week	Date	Opponent	Result	Attendance
1	September 17, 1972	at **Dallas Cowboys**	**L** 28–6	55,850
2	September 24, 1972	Cleveland Browns	**L** 27–17	65,720
3	October 2, 1972	**New York Giants**	**L** 27–12	65,720
4	October 8, 1972	at **Washington Redskins**	**L** 14–0	53,039
5	October 15, 1972	Los Angeles Rams	**L** 34–3	65,720
6	October 22, 1972	at Kansas City Chiefs	**W** 21–20	78,389
7	October 29, 1972	at New Orleans Saints	**L** 21–3	65,664
8	November 5, 1972	**St. Louis Cardinals**	**T** 6–6	65,720
9	November 12, 1972	at Houston Oilers	**W** 18–17	34,175
10	November 19, 1972	**Dallas Cowboys**	**L** 28–7	65,720
11	November 26, 1972	at **New York Giants**	**L** 62–10	62,586
12	December 3, 1972	**Washington Redskins**	**L** 23–7	65,720
13	December 10, 1972	Chicago Bears	**L** 21–12	65,720
14	December 17, 1972	at **St. Louis Cardinals**	**L** 24–23	34,872

Note: Intra-division opponents are in bold text.

== Game recaps ==
A recap of the scoring plays and the game scores by quarters during the year. The record after the team's name reflects this game's outcome also.

=== Week 9 ===
Sunday, November 12, 1972

Played at Houston Astrodome on AstroTurf in 72 °F or 22.2 °C indoors.

	1	2	3	4	Total
Philadelphia Eagles (2–6–1)	6	9	0	3	18
Houston Oilers (1–8–0)	0	3	7	7	17

		SCORING PLAYS	PHI	HOU
1st	Eagles	Tom Dempsey 33-yard field goal	3	0
	Eagles	Tom Dempsey 52-yard field goal	6	0
2nd	Oilers	Skip Butler 38-yard field goal	6	3
	Eagles	Tom Dempsey 22-yard field goal	9	3
	Eagles	Tom Dempsey 12-yard field goal	12	3
	Eagles	Tom Dempsey 38-yard field goal	15	3
3rd	Oilers	Dan Pastorini 1-yard rush (Skip Butler kick)	15	10
4th	Eagles	Tom Dempsey 20-yard field goal	18	10
	Oilers	Paul Robinson 30-yard rush (Skip Butler kick)	18	17

=== Week 11 ===
Sunday, November 26, 1972

Played at Yankee Stadium on grass in 50 °F or 10 °C weather with a wind of 15 miles per hour or 24 kilometres per hour or 13 knots

NOTE: The game was not televised by CBS after striking International Brotherhood of Electrical Workers members cut the transmission cables in The Bronx.

	1Q	2Q	3Q	4Q	Total
Philadelphia Eagles (2–8–1)	3	7	0	0	10
New York Giants (7–4–0)	14	24	10	14	62

		SCORING PLAYS	PHI	NYG
1st	Giants	Bob Tucker 15-yard pass from Norm Snead (Pete Gogolak kick)	0	7
	Giants	Ron A. Johnson 35-yard rush (Pete Gogolak kick)	0	14
	Eagles	Tom Dempsey 13-yard field goal	3	14
2nd	Giants	Joe Orduna 5-yard pass from Norm Snead (Pete Gogolak kick)	3	21
	Giants	Pete Gogolak 25-yard field goal	3	24
	Giants	Bob Tucker 29-yard pass from Norm Snead (Pete Gogolak kick)	3	31
	Eagles	Harold Jackson 77-yard pass from John Reaves (Tom Dempsey kick)	10	31
	Giants	Ron A. Johnson 1-yard rush (Pete Gogolak kick)	10	38
3rd	Giants	Pete Gogolak 29-yard field goal	10	41
	Giants	Don Herrmann 32-yard pass from Randy Johnson (Pete Gogolak kick)	10	48
4th	Giants	Don Herrmann 63-yard pass from Randy Johnson (Pete Gogolak kick)	10	55
	Giants	Randy Johnson 2-yard rush (Pete Gogolak kick)	10	62

=== Standings ===
NFC East
	W	L	T	PCT	DIV	CONF	PF	PA	STK
Washington Redskins	11	3	0	.786	7–1	10–1	336	218	L2
Dallas Cowboys	10	4	0	.714	6–2	7–4	319	240	L1
New York Giants	8	6	0	.571	5–3	7–4	331	247	W1
St. Louis Cardinals	4	9	1	.321	1–6–1	3–7–1	193	303	W2
Philadelphia Eagles	2	11	1	.179	0–7–1	0–10–1	145	352	L5

== Postseason ==
At the end of 1972 season, head coach Ed Khayat was fired. Mike McCormack, a Washington Redskins assistant coach from 1965 to 1972, was hired in his place. Khayat was never an NFL head coach again, although he would be the head coach of the New Orleans Night of the Arena Football League in 1991.
