= List of Philadelphia Eagles seasons =

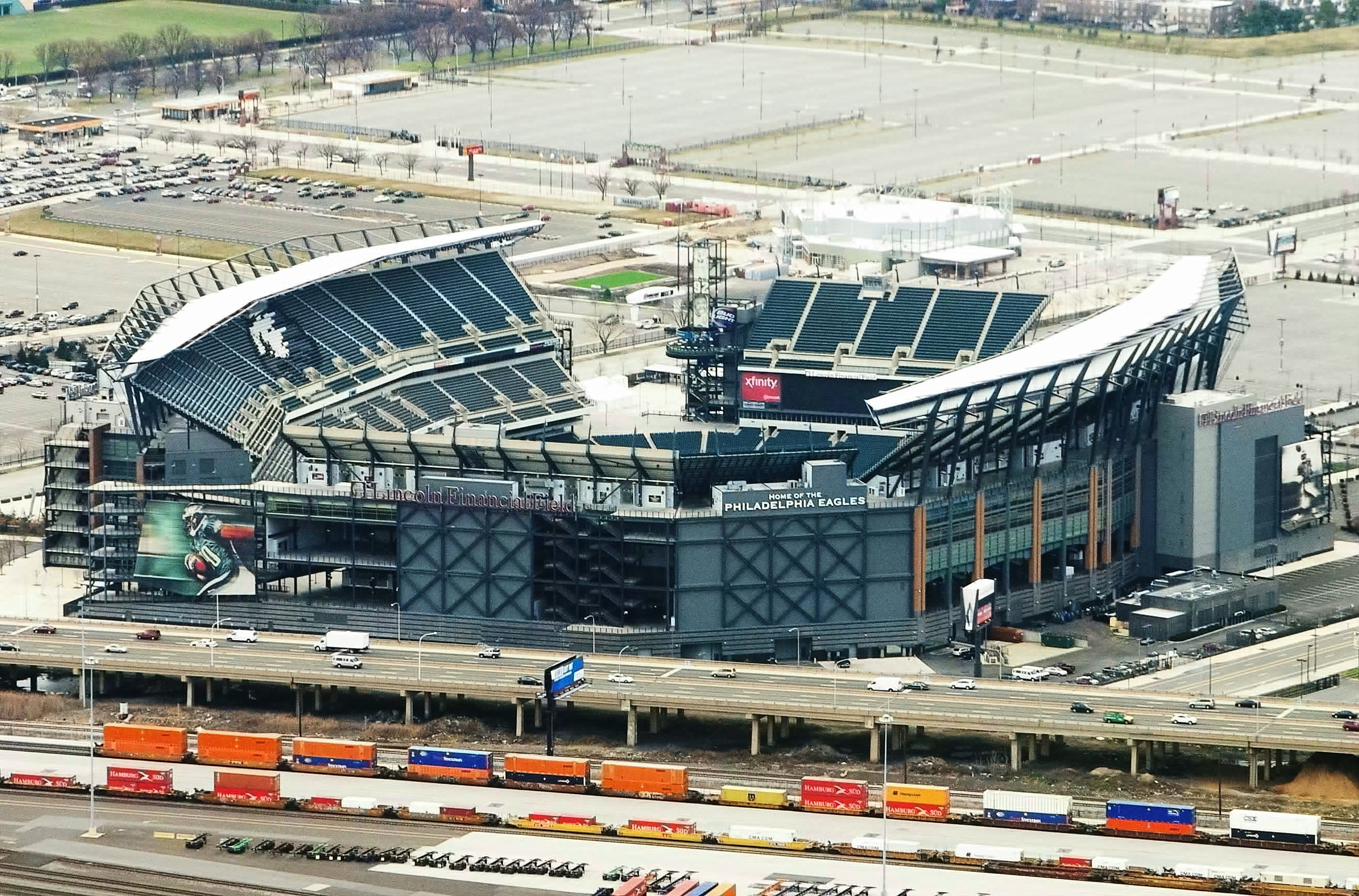
The Eagles have played their home games at Lincoln Financial Field since 2003.

The Philadelphia Eagles are a professional American football team based in Philadelphia, Pennsylvania. The Eagles compete in the National Football League (NFL) as a member of the National Football Conference (NFC) East Division. The team has played its home games at Lincoln Financial Field in South Philadelphia since 2003. On July 8, 1933, the NFL granted an expansion franchise to Bert Bell and Lud Wray and awarded them the assets of the failed Frankford Yellow Jackets organization, with Bell and Wray naming their team the Eagles after the symbol of Franklin Roosevelt's New Deal.

The Eagles have won five league titles, three of which (1948, 1949, and 1960) pre-date the existence of the Super Bowl. The fifth and most recent championship was Super Bowl LIX, the team's most recent Super Bowl appearance. The Eagles' five championships are tied for the sixth most total championships amongst all 32 NFL franchises. With their victory in Super Bowl LII, the NFC East became the first division in which every team has won at least one Super Bowl; as of 2025 it remained the only such division. No division has had all of its members make multiple Super Bowl appearances, except for the NFC East, the members of which have all appeared in at least five Super Bowls.

The Eagles and Pittsburgh Steelers, another NFL team from Pennsylvania, combined to form the "Steagles" (officially known as the "Phil-Pitt Combine") for the 1943 NFL season. The two franchises were compelled to field a single combined team because both had lost many players to military service during World War II. The team dissolved following the 1944 season, with all players and coaches returning to the team they were on prior to the temporary merger.

As of the end of the 2025 season, the Eagles have an all-time record of 649 wins, 645 losses, and 27 ties in the regular season, with an additional 29 wins and 27 losses in the playoffs. The team has had 44 winning seasons, 44 losing seasons, and 5 having as many wins as losses.

== Seasons ==
Legend
^{(#)}	The order of league championship won by the franchise
Finish	Final position in league, division, or conference
Pct	The team's winning percentage for the season
^{†}	NFL champions (1920–1969)
^{‡}	Super Bowl champions (1970–present)
^{*}	Conference champions
^{^}	Division champions
^{§}	Wild Card berth

Philadelphia Eagles record by season
Season	Team	League	Conference	Division	Regular season					Postseason results	Awards	Head coach	Refs
Season	Team	League	Conference	Division	Finish	W	L	T	Pct	Postseason results	Awards	Head coach	Refs
Philadelphia Eagles
1933	1933	NFL		East	4th	3	5	1	.389			Lud Wray	
1934	1934	NFL		East	3rd	4	7	0	.364			Lud Wray	
1935	1935	NFL		East	5th	2	9	0	.182			Lud Wray	(Note: In 1935, the NFL set the number of regular season games to 12. Prior to that, the NFL did not have a set number of games for teams to play.)
1936	1936	NFL		East	5th	1	11	0	.083			Bert Bell	
1937	1937	NFL		East	5th	2	8	1	.227			Bert Bell	(Note: In 1937, the NFL lowered the number of regular season games, which had been 12 games since 1935, to 11.)
1938	1938	NFL		East	4th	5	6	0	.455			Bert Bell	
1939	1939	NFL		East	4th	1	9	1	.136			Bert Bell	
1940	1940	NFL		East	5th	1	10	0	.091			Bert Bell	
1941	1941	NFL		East	4th	2	8	1	.227			Greasy Neale	
1942	1942	NFL		East	5th	2	9	0	.182			Greasy Neale	
Steagles
1943	1943	NFL		East	3rd	5	4	1	.550			Greasy Neale & Walt Kiesling (Note: Greasy Neale and Walt Kiesling served as co-head coaches for the 1943 season.)	(Note: In 1943, the NFL again lowered the number of regular season games, which had been 11 games since 1937, to 10.)
Philadelphia Eagles
1944	1944	NFL		East	2nd	7	1	2	.800			Greasy Neale	
1945	1945	NFL		East	2nd	7	3	0	.700			Greasy Neale	
1946	1946	NFL		East	2nd	6	5	0	.545			Greasy Neale	(Note: In 1946, the NFL expanded its regular season schedule, which had been 10 games since 1943, to 11 games.)
1947	1947	NFL		East^{^}	1st^{^}	8	4	0	.667	Won Divisional playoff (at Steelers) 21–0; Lost NFL Championship (at Cardinals) 28–21		Greasy Neale	(Note: In 1947, the NFL expanded its regular season schedule, which had been 11 games since 1946, to 12 games.)
1948	1948	NFL^{†}		East^{^}	1st^{^}	9	2	1	.792	Won NFL Championship (1) (Cardinals) 7–0		Greasy Neale	
1949	1949	NFL^{†}		East^{^}	1st^{^}	11	1	0	.917	Won NFL Championship (2) (at Rams) 14–0		Greasy Neale	
1950	1950	NFL	American (Note: In 1950, the NFL merged with the All-America Football Conference (AAFC) to become the "National-American Football League". Teams were no longer part of divisions, instead being placed into the newly created National and American conferences. The NFL reverted the name change roughly three months later.)		3rd	6	6	0	.500			Greasy Neale	
1951	1951	NFL	American		5th	4	8	0	.333			Bo McMillin (2–0) Wayne Millner (2–8)	
1952	1952	NFL	American		2nd	7	5	0	.583			Jim Trimble	
1953	1953	NFL	Eastern (Note: In 1953, the NFL renamed the American Conference to the Eastern Conference and the National Conference to the Western Conference. No teams changed conferences as a result of this.)		2nd	7	4	1	.625			Jim Trimble	
1954	1954	NFL	Eastern		2nd	7	4	1	.625			Jim Trimble	
1955	1955	NFL	Eastern		4th	4	7	1	.375			Jim Trimble	
1956	1956	NFL	Eastern		6th	3	8	1	.292			Hugh Devore	
1957	1957	NFL	Eastern		5th	4	8	0	.333			Hugh Devore	
1958	1958	NFL	Eastern		5th	2	9	1	.208			Buck Shaw	
1959	1959	NFL	Eastern		2nd	7	5	0	.583			Buck Shaw	
1960	1960	NFL^{†}	Eastern^{*}		1st^{*}	10	2	0	.833	Won NFL Championship (3) (Packers) 17–13	Norm Van Brocklin (MVP) Buck Shaw (COY)	Buck Shaw	
1961	1961	NFL	Eastern		2nd	10	4	0	.714			Nick Skorich	(Note: In 1961, the NFL expanded its regular season schedule, which had been 12 games since 1947, to 14 games.)
1962	1962	NFL	Eastern		7th	3	10	1	.250			Nick Skorich	
1963	1963	NFL	Eastern		7th	2	10	2	.214			Nick Skorich	
1964	1964	NFL	Eastern		3rd	6	8	0	.429			Joe Kuharich	
1965	1965	NFL	Eastern		5th	5	9	0	.357			Joe Kuharich	
1966	1966	NFL	Eastern		2nd	9	5	0	.643			Joe Kuharich	
1967	1967	NFL	Eastern	Capitol (Note: In 1967, the NFL realigned teams from the existing two conferences into newly created divisions. The Eastern Conference contained the Capitol and Century divisions while the Western Conference contained the Central and Coastal divisions.)	2nd	6	7	1	.464			Joe Kuharich	
1968	1968	NFL	Eastern	Capitol	4th	2	12	0	.143			Joe Kuharich	
1969	1969	NFL	Eastern	Capitol	4th	4	9	1	.321			Jerry Williams	
1970	1970	NFL	NFC (Note: In 1970, the NFL and American Football League (AFL) officially merged in the AFL–NFL merger to form one league with two conferences. All ten former AFL teams as well as Pittsburgh, Cleveland, and Baltimore from the pre-merger NFL joined the AFC; the other thirteen remaining NFL teams joined the NFC. Each of those two were divided into three divisions: East, Central, and West.)	East	5th	3	10	1	.250			Jerry Williams	
1971	1971	NFL	NFC	East	3rd	6	7	1	.464			Jerry Williams (0–3) Ed Khayat (6–4–1)	
1972	1972	NFL	NFC	East	5th	2	11	1	.179			Ed Khayat	
1973	1973	NFL	NFC	East	3rd	5	8	1	.393			Mike McCormack	
1974	1974	NFL	NFC	East	4th	7	7	0	.500			Mike McCormack	
1975	1975	NFL	NFC	East	5th	4	10	0	.286			Mike McCormack	
1976	1976	NFL	NFC	East	4th	4	10	0	.286			Dick Vermeil	
1977	1977	NFL	NFC	East	4th	5	9	0	.357			Dick Vermeil	
1978	1978	NFL	NFC	East	2nd^{§}	9	7	0	.563	Lost Wild Card playoffs (at Falcons) 14–13		Dick Vermeil	(Note: In 1978, the NFL expanded its regular season schedule, which had been 14 games since 1961, to 16 games.)
1979	1979	NFL	NFC	East	2nd^{§}	11	5	0	.688	Won Wild Card playoffs (Bears) 27–17; Lost Divisional playoffs (at Buccaneers) 24–17		Dick Vermeil	
1980	1980	NFL	NFC^{*}	East^{^}	1st^{^}	12	4	0	.750	Won Divisional playoffs (Vikings) 31–16; Won NFC Championship (Cowboys) 20–7; Lost Super Bowl XV (vs. Raiders) 27–10	Harold Carmichael (WPMOY)	Dick Vermeil	
1981	1981	NFL	NFC	East	2nd^{§}	10	6	0	.625	Lost Wild Card playoffs (Giants) 27–21		Dick Vermeil	
1982	1982	NFL	NFC	None (Note: The 1982 season was shortened to nine games after a players' strike. The top eight teams in each conference advanced to the playoffs.)	13th (Note: San Francisco finished ahead of Chicago, and Chicago finished ahead of Philadelphia, based on conference record (49ers' 2–3 to Bears' 2–5 to Eagles' 1–5).)	3	6	0	.333			Dick Vermeil	
1983	1983	NFL	NFC	East	4th	5	11	0	.313			Marion Campbell	
1984	1984	NFL	NFC	East	5th	6	9	1	.406			Marion Campbell	
1985	1985	NFL	NFC	East	4th	7	9	0	.438			Marion Campbell (6–9) Fred Bruney (1–0)	
1986	1986	NFL	NFC	East	4th	5	10	1	.344			Buddy Ryan	
1987	1987	NFL	NFC	East	4th	7	8	0	.467		Reggie White (DPOY)	Buddy Ryan	(Note: The 1987 NFL strike caused the schedule to be reduced to 15 games.)
1988	1988	NFL	NFC	East^{^}	1st^{^}	10	6	0	.625	Lost Divisional playoffs (at Bears) 20–12		Buddy Ryan	
1989	1989	NFL	NFC	East	2nd^{§}	11	5	0	.688	Lost Wild Card playoffs (Rams) 21–7		Buddy Ryan	
1990	1990	NFL	NFC	East	2nd^{§}	10	6	0	.625	Lost Wild Card playoffs (Redskins) 20–6		Buddy Ryan	
1991	1991	NFL	NFC	East	3rd	10	6	0	.625			Rich Kotite	
1992	1992	NFL	NFC	East	2nd^{§}	11	5	0	.688	Won Wild Card playoffs (at Saints) 36–20; Lost Divisional playoffs (at Cowboys) 34–10		Rich Kotite	
1993	1993	NFL	NFC	East	3rd	8	8	0	.500			Rich Kotite	
1994	1994	NFL	NFC	East	4th	7	9	0	.438			Rich Kotite	
1995	1995	NFL	NFC	East	2nd^{§}	10	6	0	.625	Won Wild Card playoffs (Lions) 58–37; Lost Divisional playoffs (at Cowboys) 30–11	Ray Rhodes (COY)	Ray Rhodes	
1996	1996	NFL	NFC	East	2nd^{§}	10	6	0	.625	Lost Wild Card playoffs (at 49ers) 14–0		Ray Rhodes	
1997	1997	NFL	NFC	East	3rd	6	9	1	.406			Ray Rhodes	
1998	1998	NFL	NFC	East	5th	3	13	0	.188			Ray Rhodes	
1999	1999	NFL	NFC	East	5th	5	11	0	.313			Andy Reid	
2000	2000	NFL	NFC	East	2nd^{§}	11	5	0	.688	Won Wild Card playoffs (Buccaneers) 21–3; Lost Divisional playoffs (at Giants) 20–10		Andy Reid	
2001	2001	NFL	NFC	East^{^}	1st^{^}	11	5	0	.688	Won Wild Card playoffs (Buccaneers) 31–9; Won Divisional playoffs (at Bears) 33–19; Lost NFC Championship (at Rams) 29–24		Andy Reid	
2002	2002	NFL	NFC	East^{^} (Note: In 2002, the NFL realigned to create four divisions in both conferences with four teams in each division. The Eagles did not change divisions, but their division did change from five teams to four.)	1st^{^}	12	4	0	.750	Won Divisional playoffs (Falcons) 20–6; Lost NFC Championship (Buccaneers) 27–10	Andy Reid (COY) Troy Vincent (WPMOY)	Andy Reid	
2003	2003	NFL	NFC	East^{^}	1st^{^}	12	4	0	.750	Won Divisional playoffs (Packers) 20–17 (OT); Lost NFC Championship (Panthers) 14–3		Andy Reid	
2004	2004	NFL	NFC^{*}	East^{^}	1st^{^}	13	3	0	.813	Won Divisional playoffs (Vikings) 27–14; Won NFC Championship (Falcons) 27–10; Lost Super Bowl XXXIX (vs. Patriots) 24–21		Andy Reid	
2005	2005	NFL	NFC	East	4th	6	10	0	.375			Andy Reid	
2006	2006	NFL	NFC	East^{^}	1st^{^}	10	6	0	.625	Won Wild Card playoffs (Giants) 23–20; Lost Divisional playoffs (at Saints) 27–24		Andy Reid	
2007	2007	NFL	NFC	East	4th	8	8	0	.500			Andy Reid	
2008	2008	NFL	NFC	East	2nd^{§}	9	6	1	.594	Won Wild Card playoffs (at Vikings) 26–14; Won Divisional playoffs (at Giants) 23–11; Lost NFC Championship (at Cardinals) 32–25		Andy Reid	
2009	2009	NFL	NFC	East	2nd^{§}	11	5	0	.688	Lost Wild Card playoffs (at Cowboys) 34–14		Andy Reid	
2010	2010	NFL	NFC	East^{^}	1st^{^}	10	6	0	.625	Lost Wild Card playoffs (Packers) 21–16	Michael Vick (CBPOY)	Andy Reid	
2011	2011	NFL	NFC	East	2nd	8	8	0	.500			Andy Reid	
2012	2012	NFL	NFC	East	4th	4	12	0	.250			Andy Reid	
2013	2013	NFL	NFC	East^{^}	1st^{^}	10	6	0	.625	Lost Wild Card playoffs (Saints) 26–24		Chip Kelly	
2014	2014	NFL	NFC	East	2nd	10	6	0	.625			Chip Kelly	
2015	2015	NFL	NFC	East	2nd	7	9	0	.438			Chip Kelly (6–9) Pat Shurmur (1–0)	
2016	2016	NFL	NFC	East	4th	7	9	0	.438			Doug Pederson	
2017	2017	NFL^{‡}	NFC^{*}	East^{^}	1st^{^}	13	3	0	.813	Won Divisional playoffs (Falcons) 15–10; Won NFC Championship (Vikings) 38–7; Won Super Bowl LII (4) (vs. Patriots) 41–33	Nick Foles (SB MVP) Howie Roseman (EOY)	Doug Pederson	
2018	2018	NFL	NFC	East	2nd^{§}	9	7	0	.563	Won Wild Card playoffs (at Bears) 16–15; Lost Divisional playoffs (at Saints) 20–14	Chris Long (WPMOY)	Doug Pederson	
2019	2019	NFL	NFC	East^{^}	1st^{^}	9	7	0	.563	Lost Wild Card playoffs (Seahawks) 17–9		Doug Pederson	
2020	2020	NFL	NFC	East	4th	4	11	1	.281			Doug Pederson	
2021	2021	NFL	NFC	East	2nd^{§}	9	8	0	.529	Lost Wild Card playoffs (at Buccaneers) 31–15		Nick Sirianni	(Note: In 2021, the NFL expanded its regular season schedule, which had been 16 games since 1978, to 17 games.)
2022	2022	NFL	NFC^{*}	East^{^}	1st^{^}	14	3	0	.824	Won Divisional playoffs (Giants) 38–7; Won NFC Championship (49ers) 31–7; Lost Super Bowl LVII (vs. Chiefs) 38–35		Nick Sirianni	
2023	2023	NFL	NFC	East	2nd^{§}	11	6	0	.647	Lost Wild Card playoffs (at Buccaneers) 32–9		Nick Sirianni	
2024	2024	NFL^{‡}	NFC^{*}	East^{^}	1st^{^}	14	3	0	.824	Won Wild Card playoffs (Packers) 22–10; Won Divisional playoffs (Rams) 28–22; Won NFC Championship (Commanders) 55–23; Won Super Bowl LIX (5) (vs. Chiefs) 40–22	Jalen Hurts (SB MVP) Saquon Barkley (OPOY)	Nick Sirianni	
2025	2025	NFL	NFC	East^{^}	1st^{^}	11	6	0	.647	Lost Wild Card playoffs (49ers) 23–19		Nick Sirianni	
Totals						649	645	27	.502	All-time regular season record (1933–2025)			
Totals						29	27	—	.518	All-time postseason record (1933–2025)			
Totals						678	672	27	.502	All-time regular & postseason record (1933–2025)			

== See also ==
- History of the Philadelphia Eagles
- List of Philadelphia Eagles first-round draft picks
- List of Philadelphia Eagles head coaches
