= List of Philadelphia Eagles head coaches =

This is a list of head coaches for the Philadelphia Eagles. The Philadelphia Eagles are a professional American football team based in Philadelphia, Pennsylvania. The Eagles joined the National Football League (NFL) as an expansion team in 1933. Currently members of the Eastern Division of the National Football Conference (NFC), the team has won five NFL titles and made five Super Bowl appearances (1980, 2004, 2017, 2022, and 2024), with their first Super Bowl victory coming in Super Bowl LII under Doug Pederson and their second coming in Super Bowl LIX under Nick Sirianni.

Four coaches have won NFL championships with the team: Earl "Greasy" Neale in 1948 and 1949, Buck Shaw in 1960, Doug Pederson in 2017, and Nick Sirianni in 2024. Andy Reid is the all-time leader in games coached and wins, while Sirianni has the highest winning percentage with .676 (with at least one full season coached). Bert Bell is statistically the worst coach the Eagles have had in terms of winning percentage, with a .185 win/loss percentage.

Of the 24 Eagles coaches, five have been elected into the Pro Football Hall of Fame. Bert Bell was a charter member of the Hall of Fame. Bell was inducted for his work as the NFL Commissioner from 1946 to 1959. Wayne Millner, who coached the team in 1951, was enshrined as a player in 1968. Greasy Neale was in the class of 1969 for his work as the Eagles coach in the 1940s. Mike McCormack made the 1984 class for his Offensive Tackle play. Dick Vermeil entered the Pro Football Hall of Fame in 2022 for his coaching career with the Eagles, Rams and Chiefs. Several former NFL players have been head coaches for the Eagles, including Jerry Williams, Ed Khayat, and Marion Campbell. Andy Reid spent 14 seasons in charge before he was fired on December 31, 2012, after a 4–12 season – Reid's worst season in charge – which left the Eagles bottom of the NFC. He was replaced by former University of Oregon head coach Chip Kelly, who led the Eagles to a 10–6 record and the playoffs. Kelly was fired on December 29, 2015, after going 6–9 through that season's first 15 games. He was replaced by offensive coordinator Pat Shurmur for Week 17. Doug Pederson served five seasons with the Eagles as their head coach before being fired on January 11, 2021, after leading the team to a 4–11–1 record in his final year as head coach. Nick Sirianni has been head coach since January 24, 2021.

== Key ==
#	Number of coaches (Note: A running total of the number of coaches of the Eagles. Thus, any coach who has two terms is only counted once.)
GC	Games Coached
W	Wins
L	Loses
T	Ties
Win%	Winning percentage
†	Elected into the Pro Football Hall of Fame as a coach
‡	Elected into the Pro Football Hall of Fame as a player
^	Elected into the Pro Football Hall of Fame as the NFL Commissioner
*	Spent entire NFL head coaching career with the Eagles

== Coaches ==
Note: Statistics are accurate through the end of the 2025 NFL season.

#	Image	Name	Term	Regular season					Playoffs			Awards	Reference
#	Image	Name	Term	GC	W	L	T	Win%	GC	W	L	Awards	Reference
1		Lud Wray	1933–1935	31	9	21	1	.306	–	–	–		
2		Bert Bell ^	1936–1940	56	10	44	2	.196	–	–	–		
3		Greasy Neale †*	1941–1950*	111	63	43	5	.590	4	3	1	NFL Championship (1948); NFL Championship (1949); Sporting News Coach of the Year (1948)	
4		Bo McMillin	1951 (Note: After two games, McMillin underwent surgery for what was believed to be ulcer troubles. It turned out to be stomach cancer, which ended his coaching career.)	2	2	0	0	1.000	–	–	–		
5		Wayne Millner ‡*	1951* (Note: Millner spent just one year as Head Coach before resigning prior to the start of the 1952, citing health problems. However, just 17 days after his decision, he accepted an assistant coaching position with the Redskins.)	10	2	8	0	.200	–	–	–		
6		Jim Trimble*	1952–1955*	48	25	20	3	.552	–	–	–		
7		Hugh Devore	1956–1957	24	7	16	1	.313	–	–	–		
8		Buck Shaw	1958–1960	36	19	16	1	.542	1	1	0	NFL Championship (1960); AP Coach of the Year (1960); UPI NFL Coach of the Year (1960)	
9		Nick Skorich	1961–1963	42	15	24	3	.393	–	–	–		
10		Joe Kuharich	1964–1968	70	28	41	1	.407	–	–	–		
11		Jerry Williams*	1969–1971*	31	7	22	2	.258	–	–	–		
12		Ed Khayat*	1971–1972*	25	8	15	2	.360	–	–	–		
13		Mike McCormack ‡	1973–1975	42	16	25	1	.393	–	–	–		
14		Dick Vermeil †	1976–1982	101	54	47	0	.535	7	3	4	Pro Football Weekly Coach of the Year (1979); Sporting News Coach of the Year (1979); UPI NFC Coach of the Year (1978)	
15		Marion Campbell	1983–1985	47	17	29	1	.372	–	–	–		
16		Fred Bruney*	1985* (Note: Bruney was appointed the interim head coach of the Eagles for the last game of the 1985 season after former coach Marion Campbell was let go with one game remaining in the season.)	1	1	0	0	1.000	–	–	–		
17		Buddy Ryan	1986–1990	79	43	35	1	.551	3	0	3		
18		Rich Kotite	1991–1994	64	36	28	0	.563	2	1	1		
19		Ray Rhodes	1995–1998	64	29	34	1	.461	3	1	2	AP Coach of the Year (1995); Sporting News Coach of the Year (1995); UPI NFC Coach of the Year (1995)	
20		Andy Reid	1999–2012	224	130	93	1	.583	19	10	9	AP Coach of the Year (2002); Pro Football Weekly Coach of the Year (2002); Sporting News Coach of the Year (2000, 2002)	
21		Chip Kelly	2013–2015	47	26	21	0	.553	1	0	1		
22		Pat Shurmur	2015 (Note: Shurmur was appointed the interim head coach of the Eagles for the last game of the 2015 season after former coach Chip Kelly was let go with one game remaining in the season.)	1	1	0	0	1.000	–	–	–		
23		Doug Pederson	2016–2020	80	42	37	1	.531	6	4	2	Super Bowl LII Championship (2017); Greasy Neale Award (2017)	
24		Nick Sirianni*	2021–present	85	59	26	0	.694	10	6	4	Super Bowl LIX Championship (2024); Greasy Neale Award (2022)	
