= 1969 Philadelphia Eagles season =

NFL team season

- Owner: Leonard Tose
- Head coach: Jerry Williams
- Home stadium: Franklin Field

Results
- Record: 4–9–1
- Division place: 4th NFL Capitol
- Playoffs: Did not qualify
- Pro Bowlers: DE Tim Rossovich; WR Harold Jackson; MLB Dave Lloyd

The 1969 Philadelphia Eagles season was the franchise's thirty-seventh season in the National Football League. The team improved on its previous output of 2–12, winning four games.

Despite the improvement, the team failed to qualify for the playoffs for the ninth consecutive season.

== Background ==
The Eagles wore both green (for road games) and white (for home games) helmets during the 1969 season. The white helmets then became part of the Eagles' permanent uniform for the next four seasons.

Philadelphia became the first NFL team to play home games on artificial turf when Franklin Field installed AstroTurf prior to this season. The Houston Oilers of the AFL was on its second season on AstroTurf; the team moved into the Astrodome the previous year.

== Offseason ==
=== NFL draft ===
The 1969 NFL/AFL draft was the third and final year in which the NFL and American Football League (AFL) held a joint draft of college players. The draft took place on January 28–29, and the Eagles alternated with the Atlanta Falcons in picking second and third over the seventeen rounds.

The draft began with first overall pick of O. J. Simpson, the Heisman Trophy-winning running back from USC, by the AFL's Buffalo Bills.

During the fourteen-game 1968 season, the Eagles had no wins until November 28 (week twelve) when the team defeated the Detroit Lions (4–8–2) in Detroit 12–0, and on December 8 (week thirteen), defeated the New Orleans Saints (4–9–1) in Philadelphia 29–17.

These victories gave the Eagles a better record than Buffalo (1–12–1) by half a game, and equaled the record of the Atlanta Falcons (2–12), which won the coin flip for the rights to the second pick in the draft, offensive tackle George Kunz from Notre Dame. Future hall of famer "Mean" Joe Greene, defensive tackle from North Texas State, was taken fourth by the Pittsburgh Steelers (2–11–1).

=== Player selections ===
Round	Pick	Player	Position	School
1	3	Leroy Keyes	RB	Purdue
2	28	Ernest Calloway	LB	Texas Southern
3	55	Pick Traded to Cleveland Browns		
3	69	Bill Bradley	DB	Texas
4	80	Bob Kuechenberg	G	Notre Dame
5	107	Jim Anderson	G	Missouri
6	132	Richard Barnhorst	TE	Xavier
7	159	Mike Schmeising	RB	St. Olaf
8	184	Bill Hobbs	LB	Texas A&M
9	211	Kent Lawrence	WR	Georgia
9	218	Lynn Buss	LB	Wisconsin
10	236	Sonny Wade	QB	Emory & Henry
10	243	Donnie Shanklin	RB	Kansas
11	263	Jim Marcum	DB	Texas-Arlington
12	288	Gary Adams	DB	Arkansas
13	314	Wade Key	TE	Southwest Texas State
14	340	James Ross	T	Bishop
15	367	Leon Angevine	WR	Penn State
16	392	Tom McClinton	DB	Southern
17	419	Bob Haack	T	Linfield (Ore.)

=== Undrafted free agents ===
1969 undrafted free agents of note
Player	Position	College
Burgin Beale	Quarterback	Elon
Dennis White	Defensive back	Northwestern

== Personnel ==
=== Staff / Coaches ===
1969 Philadelphia Eagles staff
Front office: Owner – Leonard Tose; General manager – Pete Retzlaff; Head coaches: Head coach - Jerry Williams; Offensive coaches: Offensive Coordinator / Receivers - Charlie Gauer; Running Backs – Jack Zilly; Offensive Line – Dick Stanfel	Defensive coaches: Defensive Line - Joe Moss; Defensive Backs / Secondary – Irv Cross; Linebackers - Jim Carr; Special teams coaches: Special Teams Assistant – Jack Zilly; Assistant (Kicking Teams) - Marv Levy

=== Roster ===
1969 Philadelphia Eagles roster
Quarterbacks (QB): 10 George Mira; 16 Norm Snead; Running backs (RB): 33 Ronnie Blye; 23 Harry Jones; 20 Leroy Keyes; 22 Cyril Pinder; Wide receivers (WR): 18 Ben Hawkins; 13 Chuck Hughes; 29 Harold Jackson; 12 Kent Lawrence; Tight ends (TE): 85 Gary Ballman; 86 Fred Hill	Offensive linemen (OL): 76 Joe Carollo T; 59 Mike Evans C; 78 Dave Graham T; 71 Dick Hart G; 79 Lane Howell T; 68 Mark Nordquist C/G; 70 Jim Skaggs G; Defensive linemen (DL): 57 Ernie Calloway DT; 62 Mike Dirks DT; 83 Don Hultz DE; 72 Floyd Peters DT; 88 Gary Pettigrew DT; 82 Tim Rossovich DE; 58 Mel Tom DE	Linebackers (LB): 61 Tony Guillory OLB; 56 Bill Hobbs OLB; 48 Jay Johnson OLB; 51 Ike Kelley MLB; 52 Dave Lloyd MLB; 50 Ron Porter OLB; 35 Adrian Young OLB; Defensive backs (DB): 27 Irv Cross CB; 26 Al Nelson CB; 24 Nate Ramsey SS; 30 Jimmy Raye CB; 21 Joe Scarpati FS; Special teams (ST): 38 Sam Baker K; 28 Bill Bradley S/P	Practice squad: -- Gary Adams CB; -- Len Persin DE; -- Jim Marcum CB; Reserve: 87 Fred Brown TE (IR); 66 Don Chuy G (IR); 45 Ron Medved S (IR); 41 Harry Wilson RB (IR); 37 Tom Woodeshick RB (IR); Rookies in italics

== Schedule ==
Week	Date	Opponent	Result	Record	Venue	Attendance
1	September 21	Cleveland Browns	**L** 20–27	0–1	Franklin Field	60,658
2	September 28	Pittsburgh Steelers	**W** 41–27	1–1	Franklin Field	60,658
3	October 5	**Dallas Cowboys**	**L** 7–38	1–2	Franklin Field	60,658
4	October 13	at Baltimore Colts	**L** 20–24	1–3	Municipal Stadium	56,864
5	October 19	at **Dallas Cowboys**	**L** 14–49	1–4	Cotton Bowl	71,509
6	October 26	**New Orleans Saints**	**W** 13–10	2–4	Franklin Field	60,658
7	November 2	at New York Giants	**W** 23–20	3–4	Yankee Stadium	62,912
8	November 9	at **Washington Redskins**	**T** 28–28	3–4–1	RFK Stadium	50,502
9	November 16	Los Angeles Rams	**L** 17–23	3–5–1	Franklin Field	60,658
10	November 23	at St. Louis Cardinals	**W** 34–30	4–5–1	Busch Memorial Stadium	45,512
11	November 30	at **New Orleans Saints**	**L** 17–26	4–6–1	Tulane Stadium	72,805
12	December 7	**Washington Redskins**	**L** 29–34	4–7–1	Franklin Field	60,658
13	December 14	Atlanta Falcons	**L** 3–27	4–8–1	Franklin Field	60,658
14	December 21	at San Francisco 49ers	**L** 13–14	4–9–1	Kezar Stadium	25,391
Note: Intra-division opponents are in **bold** text.

== Standings ==
NFL Capitol
	W	L	T	PCT	DIV	CONF	PF	PA	STK
Dallas Cowboys	11	2	1	.846	6–0	9–1	369	223	W3
Washington Redskins	7	5	2	.583	3–2–1	6–3–1	307	319	L1
New Orleans Saints	5	9	0	.357	1–5	4–6	311	393	W1
Philadelphia Eagles	4	9	1	.308	1–4–1	4–5–1	279	377	L4

Note: Tie games were not officially counted in the standings until 1972.
