= Richard Harris (American football) =

American gridiron football player (1948–2011)

- Harris on his 1974 Topps football card

No. 84, 77
- Position: Defensive end

Personal information
- Born: January 21, 1948; Shreveport, Louisiana, U.S.
- Died: July 26, 2011 (aged 63); Winnipeg, Manitoba, Canada
- Listed height: 6 ft 3 in (1.91 m)
- Listed weight: 265 lb (120 kg)

Career information
- College: Grambling State
- NFL draft: 1971: 1st round, 5th overall pick

Career history

Playing
- 1971–1973: Philadelphia Eagles
- 1974–1975: Chicago Bears
- 1976–1977: Seattle Seahawks

Coaching
- 1989: Eastside Express (HC)
- 1991–1996: Puget Sound Jets (HC)
- 2000: Portland Prowlers (HC)
- 2001–2004: BC Lions (DL coach)
- 2005: Ottawa Renegades (DL coach)
- 2006–2010: Winnipeg Blue Bombers (DL coach)
- 2011: Winnipeg Blue Bombers (Asst. HC/DL coach)

Awards and highlights
- All-American (1970); All-Rookie (1971)
- Stats at Pro Football Reference

Richard Drew Harris (January 21, 1948 – July 26, 2011) was an American professional football player who was a defensive end who played seven seasons in the National Football League (NFL). He was an All-American in 1970 for Grambling and was selected in the first round (5th overall pick) of the 1971 NFL draft by the Philadelphia Eagles, the first defensive player chosen. Harris was named to the NFL All-Rookie team in 1971 and was widely regarded as one of the fastest defensive linemen in professional football before being hobbled by knee injuries.

Harris spent seven seasons as a lineman in the NFL – three with the Philadelphia Eagles, two more with the Chicago Bears, and a final two years with the Seattle Seahawks. After his retirement from the NFL, Harris began a second career as a coach, leading several indoor football teams as head coach before working as a defensive assistant for the BC Lions, Ottawa Renegades, and Winnipeg Blue Bombers of the Canadian Football League (CFL).

== Personal ==
Richard Harris was born January 21, 1948, in Shreveport, Louisiana. He was raised in the historically segregated Moretown section of the city by his mother, Annice Harris. He was diagnosed with a fatty buildup around his heart when he was about 12 years old and advised at the time to avoid strenuous physical activity – advice which was roundly ignored.

Richard was only allowed to play two years of high school football. He explained:

"My mother didn't like the game. She used to think I would get crunched by those big guys, and since I was the oldest boy, she didn't want anything happening to me."

Telling his mother that he was out playing with friends when he was really going to football practice, Harris learned the game and began to develop his natural athletic skills, making use of his sprinter-caliber speed. His mother eventually relented to her son's desire to play football, declaring, "If you want it that bad, go ahead."

Initially used as a running back, Harris soon switched to defensive tackle, expressing a desire to hit opponents rather than be hit. Initially very thin at 178 pounds, Harris nevertheless made use of his superior speed and quickness in the high school game, earning the attention of college recruiters.

== College career ==
Initially just 214 pounds when he reported to college, Harris played for head coach Eddie Robinson and his Grambling Tigers, filling out to become a 6'3", 265-pound defensive lineman. Robinson enthusiastically remembered:

"He impressed us with his size and speed and quickness the first time we saw him. He could outrun most of our backs. Sometimes he'd get so worked up it was 'damn the torpedoes and full speed ahead' with him. We found out he has a temper. He is mean as hell."

Harris was the star of a 20-member senior class in 1970 which included several NFL prospects, including lineman Charles Roundtree and guard Solomon Freelon.

A preseason All-American candidate in 1970, Harris was hobbled in October of his senior season by an ankle injury which sidelined him for two games. Despite the slow start, by December Harris had begun to assert himself as a prescient and powerful defensive stopper. The Grambling defensive captain was one of three Grambling players named to The Sporting News' 1970 All-America team, joined on this elite roster by defensive end Scott Lewis and wide receiver Frank Lewis. Harris was also named to the 1970 AP Little All-American team and was tapped for the Senior Bowl. He also played in the Blue-Gray Game and the Coaches' All-American Game.

== Professional career ==
=== 1971 NFL draft ===
Going into the January 1971 NFL draft, Harris was highly touted by his former Grambling coach, Eddie Robinson, who deemed him "the quickest big man in the country." The 265-pounder was timed at 4.7 seconds in the 40 yard dash, elite speed for his position.

Harris was selected by the Philadelphia Eagles in the first round of the 1971 draft. He was taken in the first round, the fifth overall selection and the first defensive player selected.

Eagles owner Leonard Tose was enthusiastic about his team's choice, noting that it had Harris at number 4 on its draft board, behind only the first three selections of the lottery – quarterbacks Jim Plunkett, Archie Manning, and Dan Pastorini.

Tose told the Philadelphia Daily News:

"I like him because he'll improve the defensive rush. You do that and the whole team looks better. Here's a guy who can make the whole team look better. That's why we took him."

Harris was selected ahead of future defensive members of the Pro Football Hall of Fame Jack Youngblood and Jack Ham.

Harris was also named to the College All-Star team which played an exhibition game against the World Champion Baltimore Colts in July 1971, registering two sacks of quarterback Earl Morrall and chasing down running back Tom Matte from the back side on several sweeps, en route to earning Most Valuable Player honors. Colts veteran offensive lineman Bob Vogel was duly impressed, declaring, "I think Harris is a load – he really had me scrambling. If he doesn't make it, nobody will."

=== Philadelphia Eagles ===
Harris signed a contract with the Philadelphia Eagles on February 17, 1971. While official terms were not made public, the four-year deal between Harris and the team was reportedly in the range of $130,000 to $160,000.

Negotiations were clouded by legal wrangling between two sports agencies, one of which had been controversially dismissed in favor of representation by Dallas financier Zip Viracola. A lawsuit was threatened by the jilted New York agency.

After a slow start during his 1971 rookie campaign, during which Harris rode the bench while the Eagles' defense gave up more than 30 points three weeks in a row, head coach Jerry Williams was replaced by Ed Khayat. Harris was inserted into the starting lineup and quickly began to come into his own, helping to anchor a defense which only gave up just 117 points over the next seven games. Harris was rewarded in December for his stellar rookie performance with a place as one of two defensive ends on the UPI All-Rookie Team.

As was common for many players during the era, Harris took a temporary job for the NFL off-season, joining the faculty at East Stroudsburg State College in East Stroudsburg, Pennsylvania, where he taught physical education for a semester and helped out as an assistant coach during spring football practice. He would later seamlessly move into a career in coaching following the end of his NFL playing days.

Harris' stellar rookie season was not repeated in 1972, however. Nursing a sore knee during the preseason, Harris was abruptly benched by defensive coach Jess Richardson in September, ostensibly due to a failure to maintain containment assignments. "It was a matter of repeated errors or repeated following his assignment through," explained Richardson. "It was more a matter of physical error than mental – he had problems physically with his opponent."

After beginning the season 0–2, Harris was returned to his accustomed starting role as defensive left end in the third game of the 1972 season, a high profile Monday Night against the New York Giants in which brash owner Len Tose declared, "I guarantee a victory." The guarantee of victory over their hated rivals was not backed up by the Eagles' play, however, as the team fell by a score of 27–12, with Harris hyperextending and injuring his right knee in first half action. Harris managed to return to the game and continue with his sophomore season, but the losses continued to mount and frustration built, with his best friend on the Eagles, guard Henry Allison, cut at the end of October by coach Khayat in an effort to spark the team's intensity.

The Eagles would finish the 1972 season ensconced in the cellar of the NFC East with a record of 2-11-1.

Ahead of the 1973 campaign, the Eagles attempted to rebuild their fortunes by trading star wideout Harold Jackson and two future first round draft picks for 32-year old quarterback Roman Gabriel. In making the trade, new Eagles' head coach Mike McCormack and the Philadelphia front office managed to protect Richard Harris, whom the Rams coveted and who was rumored to be involved in the portentous Gabriel trade.

Harris was ultimately lost for the opening month of the 1973 season when he was double-teamed high and low in the fourth quarter of a September exhibition game against the New York Jets, partially tearing ligaments in his right knee. The team attempted to rehabilitate the injury without surgery. Moved to left tackle from his customary position of left end, the hobbled Harris, a former outside speed rusher, went into December with no sacks and was increasingly regarded as a draft bust, having failed to realize his enormous potential. His time with the Eagles neared its close, with the team insisting that he reduce his weight below 260 pounds before being moved back to his natural position of defensive end.

As the 1974 season approached, a strike was launched by the National Football League Players' Association, union of the NFL's players. The stoppage lasted from July 1 to August 10, canceling the College All-Star Game and forcing the teams to field rookie teams for most of the preseason. One of these rookies shined particularly brightly for the Eagles, defensive lineman Willie Cullars, a seventh round draft pick out of Kansas State. The termination of the strike spelled the end of Harris' time in Philadelphia, however, as on August 17 he was traded to the Chicago Bears for veteran cornerback Charlie Ford.

Eagles' line coach Jerry Wampfler indicated that the experiment of moving Harris from defensive end to defensive tackle had been a failure, declaring, "He would go into one-on-one drills and look awesome. When he gets into a game, he doesn't use a move – he just plows."

=== Chicago Bears ===
Harris took umbrage to his sudden trade to Chicago, declaring that he felt as though he had "left a piece of me in Philadelphia." He had particularly harsh words for Eagles line coach Jerry Wampfler, with whom he had a heated argument the day before the trade was announced. In response to public comments that he just plowed ahead in game action, Harris told a Philadelphia reporter: "...If they think that's the way things are going, I hope those coaches can watch me tonight [in action against the Baltimore Colts]. They talk about being fair. That's a lot of [shit]."

The Bears returned Harris to his natural defensive end position, but the year was a bad one for Harris as his new unit fell to the bottom of the NFC Central Division, ending the season with a record of 4–10. The losing began to take a toll as the team unraveled from within. After his first season in Chicago, Harris told the media:

"Losing is like you've had a hard day at the office; when you get home you're peeved and anything the family says could get you ticked off. People say the Bears are fighting [among themselves]. It isn't that we don't like each other – losing is like a time bomb inside of you waiting to go off."

The Bears substantially rebuilt for the 1975 season, returning 21 new players and adding 22 newcomers to the team. New Bears head coach Jack Pardee was very satisfied with Harris' performance going into the year, noting that his 21 tackles and 11 assists lead all linemen in the preseason. Harris opened the season in a game against his old Eagles club starting at defensive right end. By the end of October he was again battling knee problems, however, playing through pain. The Bears opened the season with a 1-4 record and hope of a playoff berth was doomed from the start.

Harris opened the 1976 season, his sixth in the league, in the Bears' camp. He was placed on waivers by the Bears early in September, however, ending his tenure with his second NFL team.

=== Seattle Seahawks ===
Harris was not without a job in the NFL for long. The same day he was placed on waivers by the Bears, Harris was claimed by the expansion Seattle Seahawks, who sought to solidify their young defensive line with an experienced veteran. Beginning the season as a reserve, Harris was added to the starting lineup at right defensive tackle by Seahawks coach Jack Patera in the middle of October.

Unsurprisingly, the new Seahawks squad found themselves mired in the cellar of the National Football Conference's western division, finishing the season with a record of 2–12.

== Coaching career ==
=== Canadian Football League ===
In 2001 Harris joined the staff of the Canadian Football League's BC Lions as a defensive assistant. He moved to the staff of the fledgling Ottawa Renegades in 2005, coaching there for a single season.

Harris joined the staff of the Winnipeg Blue Bombers in 2006, remaining with that team until his death.

== Death and legacy ==
On July 26, 2011, Harris suffered a fatal heart attack in his office at Canad Inns Stadium. He was 63 years old at the time of his death.

Despite their coach's death, the Blue Bombers continued with their scheduled home game against the Lions two days later, winning 25-20. Prior to the game, both teams and the fans participated in an emotional tribute to Harris.

Harris was survived by a wife, daughters, grandchildren and great-grandchildren.
