= Mel Tom =

American football player (1941–2006)

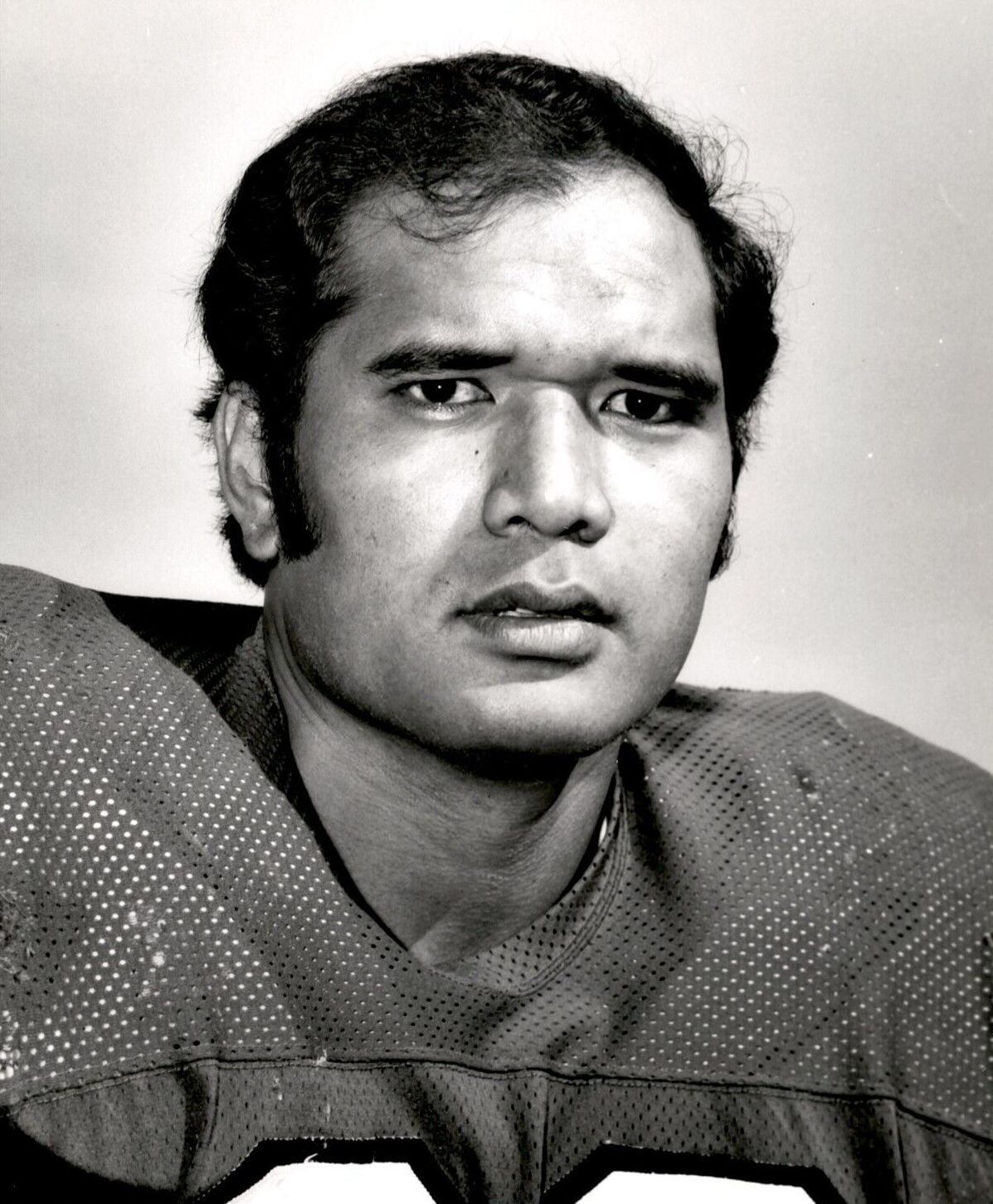
- Tom on the Philadelphia Eagles

No. 58, 99, 89
- Position: Defensive end

Personal information
- Born: August 4, 1941; Honolulu, Hawaii, U.S.
- Died: April 27, 2006 (aged 64); Kailua, Hawaii, U.S.
- Listed height: 6 ft 4 in (1.93 m)
- Listed weight: 249 lb (113 kg)

Career information
- High school: Maryknoll (Honolulu)
- College: Hawaii; San Jose State
- NFL draft: 1966: 6th round, 89th overall pick
- AFL draft: 1966: Red Shirt 9th round, 80th overall pick

Career history
- Philadelphia Eagles (1967–1973); Chicago Bears (1973–1975)

Career NFL statistics
- Fumble recoveries: 5
- Safeties: 1
- Sacks: 44.5
- Stats at Pro Football Reference

Melvyn Maile Tom (August 4, 1941 – April 27, 2006) was an American professional football player who was a defensive lineman for nine seasons in the National Football League (NFL) with the Philadelphia Eagles and Chicago Bears.

== Early life ==
Tom was born on August 4, 1941, in Honolulu, Hawaii, United States. He attended Maryknoll High School, where he did not play football. He was considered to be one of the top basketball players in Hawaii, and was called the team's "most effective man [in 1972]" by Eagles coach Mike McCormack.

== Professional career ==
=== Philadelphia Eagles ===
Tom was drafted 89th overall by the Eagles in the sixth round of the 1966 NFL Draft as a "futures pick". Tom signed with the Eagles in 1967. He finished his rookie season with five sacks.

During the 1968 season, Tom committed a roughing the punter penalty in the final two minutes of a 7–6 Eagles loss to the Giants. He finished the season with 5.5 sacks.

Heading into the 1969 season, Eagles General Manager Pete Retzlaff deemed the Eagles defensive line to be the team's strong point, with Tom being among the players Retzlaff highlighted. Tom finished the season with four sacks and a safety.

Heading into the 1970 season, Tom was described by the New York Times as one of the Eagles "few first-rate players." Tom finished the season with a career-high 7.5 sacks and a fumble recovered.

In 1971, Tom was fined $1,000 for a block that knocked Cowboys quarterback Roger Staubach unconscious. After being fined, Tom claimed that "It's more or less an unwritten rule in this league that you're not supposed to hit the quarterback hard." NFL executive director Jim Kensil refuted the existence of that 'unwritten rule'. Later that season, when Ed Khayat was hired as head coach he instituted a no facial hair policy. Tom, who had a mustache, proposed only shaving off half of his mustache, a request which was refused. After the season, Tom was listed as an honorable mention to the UPI National Football Conference Team. Tom ended the year with 4.5 sacks and a fumble recovered.

In 1972, Tom was named the Eagles team MVP. He finished the season with 6 sacks. After the season, Tom requested to be traded, desiring to instead play for a west coast team. However, he was persuaded by Mike McCormack to remain in Philadelphia for another season, with the promise that they would try to trade him the following season.

Heading into the 1973 season, Tom was listed by the New York Times as one of the Eagles' best players. During training camp, Tom was fined for being three hours late to practice. Before the season began, he publicly mulled reviving his trade request and even retirement. Four games into the season, Tom refused to play another game for the Eagles. After an argument with defensive line coach Jerry Wampfler, Tom told Wampfler to "Trade me, fire me, or fight me." He was traded to the Chicago Bears shortly afterwards for an undisclosed 1974 draft pick. Despite only playing four games for the Eagles that season, he still was second on the team in sacks.

Tom's tenure with the Eagles was marred by the team's poor regular season record, which according to sportswriter Paul Giordano, cost Tom several all-pro team appearances.

=== Chicago Bears ===
Tom ended the season with seven sacks and two fumbles recovered.

Prior to the 1974 season, Tom announced his retirement. However, Tom ended up playing in 1974, and had 32 solo tackles (51 total), four sacks, and one fumble recovered.

In 1975, Tom was placed on waivers after the Bears signed Dan Neal.

== NFL career statistics ==
Legend
**Bold**	Career high

Year	Team	Games		Sacks	Fumbles	
Year	Team	GP	GS	Sacks	FR	Yds
1967	PHI	14	6	5.0	0	0
1968	PHI	**14**	**14**	5.5	0	0
1969	PHI	**14**	12	4.0	0	0
1970	PHI	**14**	**14**	**7.5**	1	0
1971	PHI	**14**	**14**	4.5	1	0
1972	PHI	**14**	**14**	6.0	0	0
1973	PHI	4	4	2.0	**1**	1
1973	CHI	9	8	5.0	**1**	**7**
1974	CHI	**14**	7	4.0	1	1
1975	CHI	6	2	1.0	0	0
Career		117	95	44.5	5	9

== Personal life and death ==
Tom had two children, Landon Tom and Logan Tom. Logan Tom was a member of the 2000, 2004, 2008 and 2012 American Olympic indoor volleyball teams.

Tom died at age 64 of heart failure.
