= Gary Ballman =

American football player (1940–2004)

- Ballman in 1972

No. 48, 82, 85
- Position: Wide receiver

Personal information
- Born: July 6, 1940; Detroit, Michigan, U.S.
- Died: May 20, 2004 (aged 63); Aurora, Colorado, U.S.
- Listed height: 6 ft 1 in (1.85 m)
- Listed weight: 215 lb (98 kg)

Career information
- High school: East Detroit (Eastpointe, Michigan)
- College: Michigan State
- NFL draft: 1962: 8th round, 104th overall pick
- AFL draft: 1962: 16th round, 122nd overall pick

Career history
- Pittsburgh Steelers (1962–1966); Philadelphia Eagles (1967–1972); New York Giants (1973); Minnesota Vikings (1973)

Awards and highlights
- 2× Pro Bowl (1964, 1965)

Career NFL statistics
- Receptions: 323
- Receiving yards: 5,366
- Receiving touchdowns: 37
- Stats at Pro Football Reference

Gary John Ballman (July 6, 1940 – May 20, 2004) was an American professional football player who was a wide receiver in the National Football League (NFL). Ballman played college football for the Michigan State Spartans before playing halfback and wide receiver for the Pittsburgh Steelers from 1962 to 1966, making the Pro Bowl the final two seasons.

== Biography ==
Gary Ballman was born July 6, 1940, in Detroit, Michigan.

He played football collegiately at Michigan State University, joining the Spartans' varsity squad as starting right halfback in 1959 as a sophomore.

Ballaman remains among the Pittsburgh Steelers' career leaders in kickoffs (64 returns for 1,711 yards), with the second-best average of 26.7. His 93-yard return against Washington on November 17, 1963, is tied for seventh-longest in team history. He played for the Philadelphia Eagles from 1967 to 1972, then split his final season between the New York Giants and the Minnesota Vikings.

He later worked for the National Football League Players Association (NFLPA) until 1979 before moving to Colorado, where he worked as a building products salesman until his retirement in 2003.

On May 20, 2004, Ballman was stricken while mowing his lawn at home in Aurora, Colorado, and died at the age of 63.

== NFL career statistics ==
Legend
	Led the league
**Bold**	Career high

=== Regular season ===
Year	Team	Games		Receiving				
Year	Team	GP	GS	Rec	Yds	Avg	Lng	TD
1962	PIT	3	2	0	0	0.0	0	0
1963	PIT	**14**	4	26	492	18.9	67	5
1964	PIT	13	**13**	**47**	**935**	19.9	47	**7**
1965	PIT	**14**	12	40	859	**21.5**	**87**	5
1966	PIT	13	**13**	41	663	16.2	79	5
1967	PHI	12	12	36	524	14.6	67	6
1968	PHI	12	12	30	341	11.4	55	4
1969	PHI	**14**	**13**	31	492	15.9	80	2
1970	PHI	**14**	**13**	47	601	12.8	26	3
1971	PHI	6	6	13	238	18.3	57	0
1972	PHI	8	4	9	183	20.3	43	0
1973	NYG	3	0	1	16	16.0	16	0
1973	MIN	5	0	2	22	11.0	12	0
Career		131	104	323	5,366	16.6	87	37
