= Ben Hawkins (American football) =

American football player (1944–2017)

No. 18
- Position: Wide receiver

Personal information
- Born: March 22, 1944; Newark, New Jersey, U.S.
- Died: October 9, 2017 (aged 73); Belmar, New Jersey, U.S.
- Listed height: 6 ft 2 in (1.88 m)
- Listed weight: 190 lb (86 kg)

Career information
- High school: Weequahic (Newark); Nutley (Nutley, New Jersey)
- College: Arizona State
- NFL draft: 1966: 3rd round, 36th overall pick
- AFL draft: 1966: 5th round, 38th overall pick

Career history
- Philadelphia Eagles (1966–1973); Cleveland Browns (1974); Philadelphia Bell (1975)

Awards and highlights
- NFL receiving yards leader (1967); Second-team All-American (1965)

Career NFL statistics
- Receptions: 261
- Receiving yards: 4,764
- Receiving touchdowns: 32
- Stats at Pro Football Reference

Benjamin Charles Hawkins (March 22, 1944 – October 9, 2017), nicknamed "the Hawk", was an American professional football player who was a wide receiver in the National Football League (NFL), primarily for the Philadelphia Eagles from 1966 to 1973. He later played in the NFL for the Cleveland Browns and the Philadelphia Bell of the World Football League (WFL). Hawkins led the NFL in receiving yards while with the Eagles in 1967. He played college football for the Arizona State Sun Devils and was selected in the third round of the 1966 NFL draft by the Eagles. Hawkins was also selected in the fifth round of the 1966 AFL draft by the New York Jets but opted to play in the NFL instead.

Born in Newark, New Jersey, Hawkins attended Weequahic High School before moving to nearby Nutley and transferring to Nutley High School. He had two children.

Hawkins died on October 9, 2017, at age 73.

== NFL career statistics ==
Legend
| | Led the league |
| **Bold** | Career high |

| Year | Team | Games | | Receiving | | | | |
| Year | Team | GP | GS | Rec | Yds | Avg | Lng | TD |
|---|---|---|---|---|---|---|---|---|
| 1966 | PHI | 14 | 12 | 14 | 143 | 10.2 | 23 | 0 |
| 1967 | PHI | 14 | 14 | **59** | **1,265** | **21.4** | 87 | **10** |
| 1968 | PHI | 14 | 14 | 42 | 707 | 16.8 | **92** | 5 |
| 1969 | PHI | 14 | 14 | 43 | 761 | 17.7 | 58 | 8 |
| 1970 | PHI | 14 | 9 | 30 | 612 | 20.4 | 78 | 4 |
| 1971 | PHI | 14 | 12 | 37 | 650 | 17.6 | 65 | 4 |
| 1972 | PHI | 14 | 14 | 30 | 512 | 17.1 | 67 | 1 |
| 1973 | PHI | 4 | 4 | 6 | 114 | 19.0 | 37 | 0 |
| 1974 | CLE | 2 | 0 | 0 | 0 | 0.0 | 0 | 0 |
| Career | | 104 | 93 | 261 | 4,764 | 18.3 | 92 | 32 |
