= Pete Liske =

American football player (1942–2022)

No. 18, 14
- Positions: Quarterback, Defensive back

Personal information
- Born: May 24, 1942; Plainfield, New Jersey, U.S.
- Died: February 12, 2022 (aged 79); Wenatchee, Washington, U.S.
- Listed height: 6 ft 3 in (1.91 m)
- Listed weight: 200 lb (91 kg)

Career information
- High school: Plainfield (New Jersey)
- College: Penn State (1961–1963)
- NFL draft: 1963: 10th round, 130th overall pick
- AFL draft: 1963: 15th round, 115th overall pick

Career history
- New York Jets (1964); Toronto Argonauts (1965); Calgary Stampeders (1966–1968); Denver Broncos (1969–1970); Philadelphia Eagles (1971–1972); Calgary Stampeders (1973–1974); BC Lions (1974–1975)

Awards and highlights
- Jeff Nicklin Memorial Trophy (1967); CFL's Most Outstanding Player Award (1967); CFL All-Star (1967); CFL Western All-Star (1967); Second-team All-Eastern (1962)

Career NFL/AFL statistics
- Passing attempts: 778
- Passing completions: 396
- Completion percentage: 50.9%
- TD–INT: 30–46
- Passing yards: 5,170
- Passer rating: 60.4
- Stats at Pro Football Reference

Peter Adrian Liske (/lɪsk/ LISK; May 24, 1942 – February 12, 2022) was an American professional football quarterback and later a university athletics administrator.

== Early life and college ==
Liske played his high school football in Plainfield, New Jersey, and graduated from Plainfield High School in 1959. He was good enough to go on to the powerhouse Penn State Nittany Lions, and was later (on October 6, 2000) elected to the Plainfield High School Hall of Fame (as was Vic Washington, another football player, who coincidentally played against Liske in the CFL's 56th Grey Cup.)

He played for Penn State from 1961 to 1963, quarterbacking winning teams each year. In 1961, he saw limited action (17 for 32 and 216 yards) but was a starter in the other years. In 1962, he completed 91 of 162 passes for 1,037 yards and 12 touchdowns (with four interceptions.) In 1963, he completed 87 of 161 passes for 1,117 yards and ten touchdowns (with five picks.)

== Professional career ==
Prior to his fifth-year senior season at Penn State, Liske was drafted in 1963 by both American professional football leagues, the NFL and AFL. The Philadelphia Eagles picked him in the tenth round, 130th overall, of the NFL draft and the American Football League New York Titans picked him in the 15th round, 115th overall of the AFL draft. He chose the AFL, and played with the newly renamed New York Jets.

Liske saw limited playing time in 1964 with New York, playing in only four games (only 18 passes). His career took a turn up north, with the Toronto Argonauts of the Canadian Football League. Canadian teams of this time were still a very viable career option, as they paid comparable money and offered more playing time. Liske played 11 games with Toronto in 1965.

From 1966 to 1968, he moved to the Calgary Stampeders, where he enjoyed his greatest success as a professional. In 1967, he threw for 4,479 yards, a whopping figure for that era, and 40 touchdowns, the latter breaking Tobin Rote's league record of 38 in 1960 for Toronto. His touchdown record lasted until Doug Flutie surpassed him in 1993. He was named an all-star and won the CFL's Most Outstanding Player Award. In 1968, after a season comprising 4,333 yards passing and 31 touchdowns (though with 28 interceptions), he led his team to the 56th Grey Cup, losing a close and exciting game to the Ottawa Rough Riders. Liske's passing records were eventually eclipsed by Doug Flutie's in a more wide-open era.

Liske chose to return to the AFL in 1969, joining the Denver Broncos and playing seven games. In 1970, now in the NFL, he played 11 games with Denver. He moved on to the Philadelphia Eagles for the 1971 and 1972 seasons, playing 14 games in each. However, he did not have the success he had in the CFL, as none of his teams had a winning season. His combined total American professional record was: 50 games over five seasons, with 396 of 778 passes completed, for 5170 yards and 30 touchdowns with 46 interceptions.

Canada beckoned once again, and in 1973 he rejoined the Stampeders. He remained in Calgary until part way through the 1974 season, when he joined the British Columbia Lions. In Calgary for a second time around, he did not enjoy the same success, throwing more interceptions than touchdowns in 1973 and 1974. In 1975, his last season, still with the Lions, he completed 152 of 280 passes for 2310 yards and 13 touchdowns with 9 picks.

== Later life and honors ==
In 2002 Liske's number 14 was added to the Calgary Stampeders' Wall of Fame. He was a game official in the NFL from 1983 through 1988, a back judge wearing uniform number 21.

Liske left the private sector in 1985 for the University of Washington in Seattle, where he started as an associate athletic director, with a focus on fundraising and promotions. He became the athletic director at the University of Idaho in Moscow in 1992, and moved to the University of Toledo in 1996. In late 2001, Liske returned to his alma mater, Penn State, where he was appointed director of major gifts for intercollegiate athletics, with special emphasis on developing funding for the improvement of athletic facilities.

Liske died at age 79 due to Alzheimer's disease in Wenatchee, Washington.

== See also ==
- List of American Football League players
