= Harold Jackson (American football) =

American football player and coach (born 1946)

- Jackson in 1972

No. 48, 29, 89
- Position: Wide receiver

Personal information
- Born: January 6, 1946 (age 80); Hattiesburg, Mississippi, U.S.
- Listed height: 5 ft 10 in (1.78 m)
- Listed weight: 175 lb (79 kg)

Career information
- High school: Rowan (Hattiesburg)
- College: Jackson State (1965–1967)
- NFL draft: 1968: 12th round, 323rd overall pick

Career history

Playing
- Los Angeles Rams (1968); Philadelphia Eagles (1969–1972); Los Angeles Rams (1973–1977); New England Patriots (1978–1981); Minnesota Vikings (1982); Seattle Seahawks (1983)

Coaching
- New England Patriots (1985–1989) Wide receivers coach; North Carolina Central (1990) Assistant coach; New Orleans Night (1991) Offensive coordinator; Tampa Bay Buccaneers (1992–1993) Wide receivers coach; Virginia Union (1994) Assistant coach; Benedict (1995–1996) Head coach; New Orleans Saints (1997–1999) Wide receivers coach; Kentucky (2001–2002) Wide receivers coach; Baylor (2003–2006) Wide receivers coach; Hartford Colonials (2010) Assistant coach; Sacramento Mountain Lions (2012) Assistant coach; Jackson St. (2014–2015) Head coach

Awards and highlights
- First-team All-Pro (1973); 2× Second-team All-Pro (1972, 1977); 5× Pro Bowl (1969, 1972, 1973, 1975, 1977); NFL receptions leader (1972); 2× NFL receiving yards leader (1969, 1972); NFL receiving touchdowns leader (1973)

Career NFL statistics
- Receptions: 579
- Receiving yards: 10,372
- Receiving touchdowns: 76
- Stats at Pro Football Reference

Head coaching record
- Career: 12–23 (.343)

Harold Leon Jackson (born January 6, 1946) is an American former football player and coach. He played professionally as a wide receiver in the National Football League (NFL) from 1968 through 1983 after a two-year stint playing college football for the Jackson State Tigers.

Jackson was selected by the Los Angeles Rams in the 12th round of the 1968 NFL/AFL draft, going on to far outperform his draft position over the course of a professional football career spanning well over a decade.

Jackson was a first team All-Pro in 1973 and was named a second team All-Pro in two other seasons. He appeared in a total of five Pro Bowl games. He twice led the NFL in total yards receiving, finishing with over 10,000 yards gained and 76 touchdowns in more than 200 game appearances.

== College career ==
Jackson attended Jackson State College in Jackson, Mississippi. He received a degree in secondary education in 1968. Outside of playing football at Jackson State, he was also a sprinting champion in college, with a best time of 9.3 seconds in the 100 yard dash.

== Professional career ==
Jackson was drafted 323rd overall in the 12th round by the Los Angeles Rams in 1968. After appearing in only two games during his rookie season, Jackson was traded to the Philadelphia Eagles along with defensive end John Zook for running back Israel Lang on July 7, 1969. He quickly emerged as one of the top receivers in the NFL, finishing the 1969 season with 65 receptions for a league-best 1,116 yards and 9 touchdowns. During his years with the Eagles, Jackson led the NFL in receptions in 1972 and in receiving yardage in both 1969 and 1972.

Prior to the 1973 NFL season, the Eagles traded Jackson back to the Rams for quarterback Roman Gabriel (who was expendable as the Rams had acquired John Hadl). Jackson led the NFL in receiving touchdowns in 1973 with 13 and helped the Rams rebound from a 6–7–1 record the previous season to a 12–2 finish that won them the first of 7 straight NFC West Division Championships. Statistically, his greatest NFL game came against Dallas on October 14, 1973, when he caught 7 passes for 238 yards and 4 touchdowns (this came in the midst of a string of four games in which he caught a total of 13 passes for 422 yards for a 32.5-yard average with 8 touchdowns).

During his career, Jackson was selected to play in the Pro Bowl five times. In 1972, he was named 2nd-team All-Pro by the Associated Press (AP), the Pro Football Writers Association (PFWA) and the Newspaper Enterprise Association (NEA) and was voted 1st-team All-NFC by the Associated Press (AP), The Sporting News and UPI. He was a consensus first-team All-Pro and All-NFC choice in 1973. He was voted 2nd team All-NFC by UPI in 1976, 1st team All-NFC by The Sporting News and UPI in 1977 and 2nd team All-Pro by the NEA in 1977.

In 1978, Jackson was traded to the New England Patriots. Alongside Stanley Morgan, Jackson helped form one of the NFL's best starting wide receiver duos of the late 1970s and early 1980s. Jackson became the NFL's active leader in receiving yards when Fred Biletnikoff retired after 1978, and remained the league leader for his remaining five seasons. At the time he was ranked 15th all-time, but would eventually reach second place.

In 1979, Jackson finished with 1,013 yards receiving, seven touchdown receptions and was second in the NFL in yards-per-catch with an average of 22.5. His teammate Morgan, who was nine years younger than Jackson, was the only one to finish with a higher average that season. Jackson finished his career by playing one season each for the Minnesota Vikings (1982) and the Seattle Seahawks (1983).

During his career, Jackson had 29 career 100-yard games and three 1,000-yard seasons. At the time of his retirement, only Don Maynard had more career receiving yards than Jackson. He currently ranks 26th in league history in career receiving yardage. For the decade of the 1970s, Jackson ranked first in receptions (432), yards (7,724) and receiving touchdowns (61). Despite this, Jackson was not one of the wide receivers selected to the NFL's All-Decade Team for the 1970s and he has yet to be elected to the Pro Football Hall of Fame.

In 2011, the Professional Football Researchers Association named Jackson to the PRFA Hall of Very Good Class of 2011.

== Coaching career ==
After retiring from professional football, Jackson coached receivers for 10 years in the NFL with New England (1985–89), Tampa Bay (1992–93) and New Orleans (1997–99). In his first NFL season as a coach, the Patriots won the AFC Championship and played in Super Bowl XX. In 1987, he suited for two of the Patriots replacement games, but did not play. Jackson served as the receivers coach at Baylor University. On January 13, 2014, Jackson was named the head coach at Jackson State University. Coach Jackson was fired on October 6, 2015, after the Tigers got off to a 1–4 start.

== Career statistics ==
=== NFL ===
Legend
	Led the league
**Bold**	Career high

Year	Team	GP	GS	Receiving					Rushing				
Year	Team	GP	GS	Rec	Yds	Avg	Lng	TD	Att	Yds	Avg	Lng	TD
1968	LAR	2	0	—	—	—	—	—	—	—	—	—	—
1969	PHI	14	14	**65**	**1,116**	17.2	65	9	2	10	5.0	6	0
1970	PHI	14	12	41	613	15	**79**	5	1	-5	-5.0	-5	0
1971	PHI	14	12	47	716	15.2	69	3	5	41	8.2	18	0
1972	PHI	14	14	62	1,048	16.9	77	4	**9**	**76**	8.4	**34**	0
1973	LAR	14	14	40	874	21.9	69	**13**	2	-8	-4.0	-3	0
1974	LAR	14	14	30	514	17.1	44	5	1	4	4.0	4	0
1975	LAR	14	14	43	786	18.3	54	7	—	—	—	—	—
1976	LAR	14	14	39	751	19.3	65	5	1	15	**15.0**	15	0
1977	LAR	14	14	48	666	13.9	58	6	1	6	6.0	6	0
1978	NE	16	13	37	743	20.1	57	6	1	7	7.0	7	0
1979	NE	16	16	45	1,013	**22.5**	59	7	3	12	4.0	12	0
1980	NE	16	15	35	737	21.1	40	5	5	37	7.4	16	0
1981	NE	16	15	39	669	17.2	45	0	2	-14	-7.0	-5	0
1982	MIN	1	0	—	—	—	—	—	—	—	—	—	—
1983	SEA	15	6	8	126	15.8	29	1	—	—	—	—	—
Career		208	187	579	10,372	17.9	79	76	33	181	5.5	34	0

=== Head coaching record ===
Year	Team	Overall	Conference	Standing	Bowl/playoffs
**Benedict Tigers** (Southern Intercollegiate Athletic Conference) (1995–1996)
1995	Benedict	3–6	0–1	11th	
1996	Benedict	3–6	1–0	10th	
Benedict:		6–12	1–1		
**Jackson State Tigers** (Southwestern Athletic Conference) (2014–2015)
2014	Jackson State	5–7	3–6	T–3rd (East)	
2015	Jackson State	1–4 (Note: Fired on October 6.)	1–2	N/A	
Jackson State:		6–11	4–8		
Total:		12–23			
