= Jill Arrington =

American sportscaster

- Born: Tiffany Arrington; Conyers, Georgia, U.S.
- Occupations: Sportscaster, TV host
- Years active: 1994–present
- Spouse: Dean Panaro (m. 2001; div. 2014)
- Children: 1 daughter (Presley Kate Panaro (born 18 June 2004))
- Father: Rick Arrington
- Relatives: Dakota Fanning (niece); Elle Fanning (niece)

Tiffany "Jill" Arrington is an American sportscaster and reporter. She previously was a sports anchor at KCBS-TV and KCAL-TV in Los Angeles for three years. Before that, she was in the same position at Fox Sports 1 and Fox SportsNet for five years, after being a sideline reporter on college football for ESPN during the 2004 college football season.

== Career ==
After graduating from the University of Miami with a degree in broadcast journalism, Arrington began her broadcasting career as a producer on Main Floor and Real TV. She then entered the sports world as a sideline reporter for Fox Sports covering women's tennis and features for FOX NFL Sunday. She was also the co-host of FOX Sports' NFL Under the Helmet for one season. Arrington was the host of the Arena Football League's pregame show on TNN, as well as the sideline reporter for arena football games for three seasons. She then went to CBS Sports as the lead sideline reporter on the Southeastern Conference College Football and US Open Tennis tournament for four years, as well as feature reporter on The NFL Today show.

Arrington switched to ESPN for a year as the lead college football sideline reporter for primetime games and feature reporter on ESPN College Gameday. After taking some time off to raise her daughter, she returned to Fox Sports in 2010 as the host of FSN's Totally NASCAR, College Football Saturday Preview, Verizon NFL Mobile Updates on FOX NFL Sunday, FoxSportsFlash, and NFL Online OT. She was a sports anchor for FoxSports1's 3 Things to Know live sports news updates for two years, as well as co-host and feature reporter for FS1's America's Pregame. She was also a sports anchor in Los Angeles for the duopoly of KCBS-TV/KCAL-TV.

Arrington has appeared in endorsements for Zima and Nike, and has performed voice-over work for Madden NFL 2005.
