= Hank Allison =

American football player (born 1947)

- Allison in 1972

No. 65, 61, 68, 73
- Positions: Guard, tackle

Personal information
- Born: February 11, 1947 (age 79); Stevenson, Alabama, U.S.
- Listed height: 6 ft 3 in (1.91 m)
- Listed weight: 255 lb (116 kg)

Career information
- High school: South (OH)
- College: College of the Sequoias; San Diego State
- NFL draft: 1971: 2nd round, 50th overall pick

Career history
- Philadelphia Eagles (1971–1972); St. Louis Cardinals (1975–1977); Denver Broncos (1977)

Awards and highlights
- First-team All-American (1970)

Career NFL statistics
- Games played: 55
- Games started: 11
- Stats at Pro Football Reference

Henry Henderson Allison (born February 11, 1947) is an American former professional football player who was an offensive tackle in the National Football League (NFL). After playing college football for the San Diego State Aztecs, he was selected in the second round of the 1971 NFL draft with the 50th overall pick by the Philadelphia Eagles.

After two seasons with the Eagles, Allison contributed another three seasons with the St. Louis Cardinals and finished his NFL career with the Denver Broncos.
