= Don Zimmerman (wide receiver) =

American football player (1949–2020)

No. 80
- Position: Wide receiver

Personal information
- Born: November 22, 1949; Monroe, Louisiana, U.S.
- Died: May 11, 2020 (aged 70); Monroe, Louisiana, U.S.
- Listed height: 6 ft 3 in (1.91 m)
- Listed weight: 195 lb (88 kg)

Career information
- High school: Richwood (Ouachita Parish, Louisiana)
- College: Arkansas–Pine Bluff, Northeast Louisiana
- NFL draft: 1972: 12th round, 300th overall pick

Career history
- Philadelphia Eagles (1972–1976); Green Bay Packers (1976)

Career NFL statistics
- Receptions: 53
- Receiving yards: 601
- Touchdowns: 5
- Games played: 41
- Stats at Pro Football Reference

Don Zimmerman (November 22, 1949 – May 11, 2020) was an American professional football player who was a wide receiver in the National Football League (NFL). He played for the Philadelphia Eagles and Green Bay Packers from 1973 to 1976. Zimmerman was selected by Philadelphia in the 12th round of the 1972 NFL draft with the 300th overall pick.

== Early life and college career ==
Zimmerman was born in Monroe, Louisiana, and attended Richwood High School in Ouachita Parish, Louisiana. He played college football at Arkansas–Pine Bluff and Northeast Louisiana.

Zimmerman was a two-year letterman at Northeast Louisiana, where he also competed in track and field and majored in education.

== Professional career ==
The Philadelphia Eagles selected Zimmerman in the 12th round of the 1972 NFL draft with the 300th overall pick. He spent the 1972 season on the Eagles' taxi squad before appearing in regular-season games beginning in 1973.

Zimmerman played 41 NFL games from 1973 to 1976. He had 53 receptions for 601 yards and five touchdowns, along with one rushing attempt for three yards. His most productive season came in 1974, when he had 30 receptions for 368 yards and two touchdowns for Philadelphia.

Zimmerman was part of Philadelphia's 1973 receiving group with Harold Carmichael and Charle Young. Eagles writer Ray Didinger later referred to the group as the "Fire High Gang".

== Death ==
Zimmerman died in Monroe on May 11, 2020, at age 70.
