= Sonny Davis (running back) =

American football player (born 1948)

No. 43
- Position: Running back

Personal information
- Born: January 16, 1948 (age 78); Alcoa, Tennessee, U.S.
- Listed height: 5 ft 11 in (1.80 m)
- Listed weight: 215 lb (98 kg)

Career information
- High school: Alcoa
- College: Tennessee State
- NFL draft: 1971: 11th round, 264th overall pick

Career history
- Philadelphia Eagles (1971); The Hawaiians (1974–1975)

Career NFL statistics
- Rushing attempts: 47
- Rushing yards: 163
- Rushing TDs: 1
- Stats at Pro Football Reference

Albert Lee "Sonny" Davis (born January 16, 1948) is an American former professional football player who was a running back in the National Football League (NFL). He played college football for the Tennessee State Tigers.

== Early life ==
Davis was born and grew up in Alcoa, Tennessee and attended Alcoa High School. Davis was the first athlete to compete in integrated sports in Blount County, Tennessee and was named All-County, All-State and All-American as a junior and senior.

== College career ==
Davis was one of the first African American players to be recruited by the University of Tennessee along with Lester McClain, but ultimately enrolled at Tennessee State after Tennessee questioned his test scores. Davis played four seasons for the Tigers and led the team with six touchdowns scored as a sophomore.

== Professional career ==
Davis was selected 264th overall in the 11th round of the 1971 NFL draft by the Philadelphia Eagles. As a rookie, he rushed for 163 yards and one touchdown on 47 carries and caught 11 passes for 46 yards.

Davis played for The Hawaiians of the World Football League from 1974 to 1975.

== Post-football ==
After retiring from football, Davis became a teacher in the Camden School District and eventually became a high school principal.
