= Dick Hart (American football) =

American football player (born 1943)

No. 71, 62
- Position: Guard

Personal information
- Born: March 4, 1943 (age 83); Morrisville, Pennsylvania, U.S.

Career history
- Philadelphia Eagles (1967–1970); Buffalo Bills (1971)

Career NFL statistics
- Games played: 61
- Games started: 59
- Fumble recoveries: 1
- Stats at Pro Football Reference

Richard Kay Hart (born March 4, 1943) is an American former professional football player who was a guard in the National Football League (NFL). Hart played minor league baseball in the Milwaukee Braves organization from 1961 to 1965 and did not play college football. He signed with the Philadelphia Eagles in 1966. He also played for the Buffalo Bills.
