= Cal Poly Humboldt Marching Lumberjacks =

College marching band in Arcata, California

Marching Lumberjacks
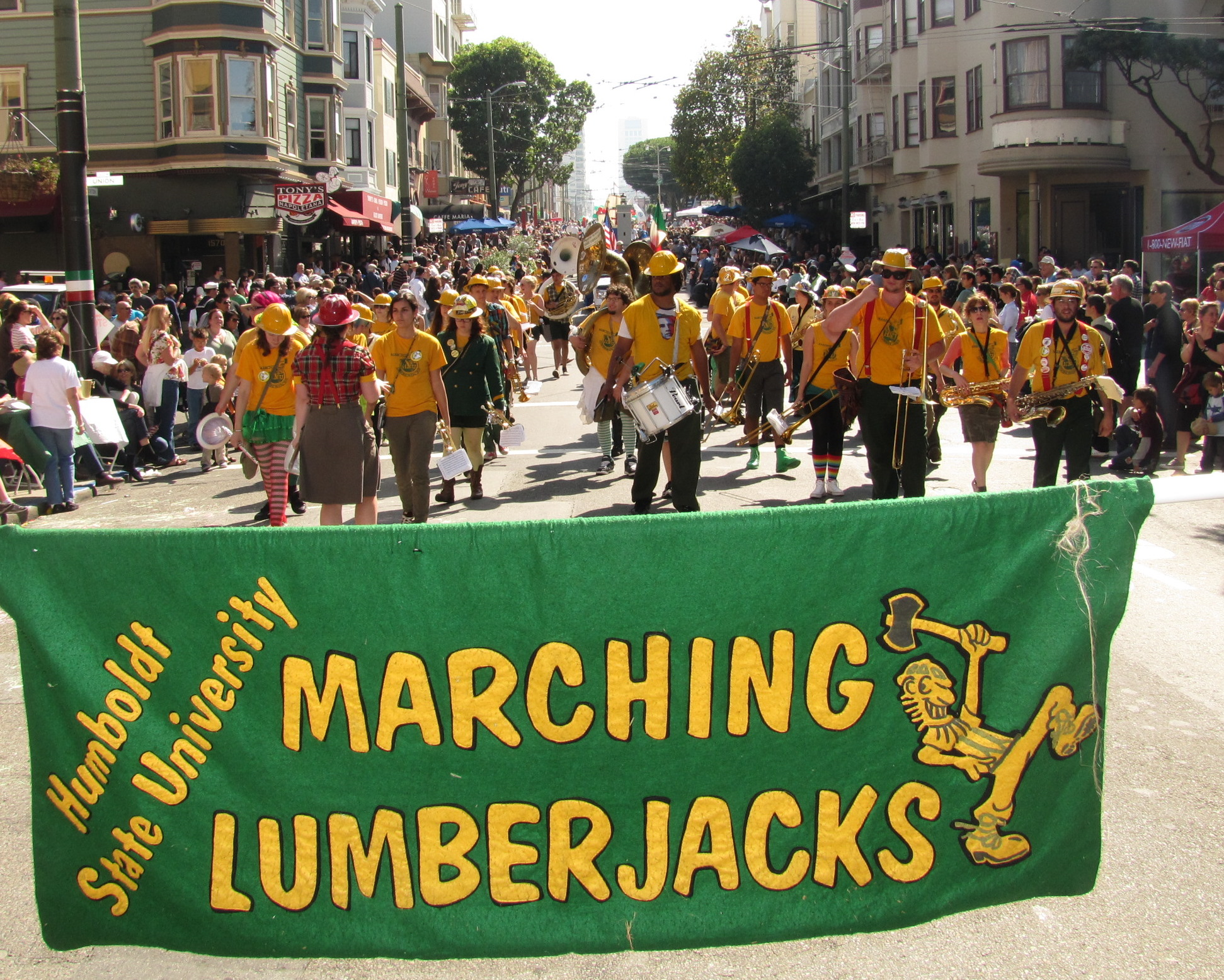
- Marching Lumberjacks at Columbus Day Italian Heritage Parade in SF North Beach 2011
- School: Cal Poly Humboldt
- Location: Arcata, California
- Founded: 1968
- Fight song: "Drive on Humboldt"

The Marching Lumberjacks are the official student run marching band of California State Polytechnic University, Humboldt (formerly Humboldt State University). Established in 1968, the band performs in the scatter band style often associated with Ivy League schools, using humorous routines and scripts during its halftime field shows in Redwood Bowl.

== Performances ==
The band plays at numerous campus and community events, marches in parades across California, Oregon and Washington, aids in student recruiting, and performs at home football and basketball games. Its traditional uniform consists of a yellow aluminum logger's hardhat, suspenders, a yellow t-shirt with the band's "marching Lucky Logger" logo on the front and "Kiss our Axe" logo on the back, green work pants, and boots. Major away gigs are broken up into the spring and fall semesters. Spring events include Cloverdale Citrus Parade in Cloverdale, St. Patrick's Day Parade in San Francisco, and Battle of the Marching Bands at UC Davis, and fall events include Paul Bunyan Days parade in Fort Bragg and Italian Heritage Parade in San Francisco.

=== The Band's Introduction ===
Ladies and gentlemen
Boys and Girls
Republicans and Democrats
Tea Partiers and Greens...
The Associated Students of Humboldt State
Are unable to prevent your world famous
Humboldt State University Marching Lumberjacks!

== Appearances in Media ==
The group was depicted marching into the Pacific Ocean in a photograph in the July 1993 National Geographic magazine. Members of the band were cast to portray a high school band in the 2001 feature film The Majestic with Jim Carrey, filmed in Ferndale, California. The band was also featured in a New York Times article about the football experience at Humboldt State.

== Fight song ==
=== Drive on Humboldt ===
==== Football version ====
Drive on Humboldt, on down the field;
Drive on Humboldt, we'll never yield!
Tackle 'em, Sock 'em, Back Field, Rock 'em
We are on the make! Rah Rah Rah!
We must have a victory;
for the green and gold!
So FIGHT! FIGHT! FIGHT and WIN,
For Humboldt State!

==== Basketball version ====
Drive on Humboldt, on down the floor;
Drive on Humboldt, show them the door;
Forwards snuff ‘em, Centers stuff ‘em;
We are on the make! RAH RAH RAH!
We must have a victory,
for the Green and Gold,
So fight, fight, fight and win
for Humboldt State!

==== Parade Version ====
Drive on Humboldt, on down the Street;
Drive on Humboldt, show off your feet;
Lefts confuse us, Rights confound us;
We are on the make RAH RAH RAH!
We must have a victory,
for the green and gold,
So fight, fight, fight and win
for Humboldt State!

== Crab Grass Band ==
In 1983, Marching Lumberjack graduates formed the Crab Grass Band, a band that has played between innings and between pitches at most Humboldt Crabs baseball games at Arcata Ball Park since 1983.
