= Tom Bailey (American football) =

American football player (1949–2005)

- Bailey in 1972

No. 31
- Position: Running back

Personal information
- Born: February 7, 1949; Gainesville, Florida, U.S.
- Died: September 2, 2005 (aged 56); Jacksonville Beach, Florida, U.S.

Career information
- High school: Coral Gables Senior (Coral Gables, Florida)
- College: Florida State
- NFL draft: 1971: 10th round, 256th overall pick

Career history
- Philadelphia Eagles (1971–1975)

Career NFL statistics
- Games played: 50
- Rushing att–yards: 60–186
- Receptions–yards: 28–194
- Touchdowns: 2
- Stats at Pro Football Reference

George Thomas Bailey (February 7, 1949 – September 2, 2005) was an American professional football running back in the National Football League (NFL). He was a 10th round selection (256th overall pick) in the 1971 NFL draft out of Florida State University. He played four seasons for the Philadelphia Eagles from 1971 to 1974.

== Early life and education ==
Bailey was born in Gainesville, Florida, on February 7, 1949. He attended Coral Gables Senior High School in Coral Gables, Florida.

He attended Florida State University, where he played collegiate football for the Florida State Seminoles and set several all-time statistical records, including the first touchdown in the inaugural Peach Bowl. An endowment scholarship in his name was created by Florida State University athletic alumni in 2010.

== Career ==
Following his graduation from Florida State, Bailey entered the National Football League, where he was drafted by the Philadelphia Eagles in the tenth round of the 1971 NFL draft. He played four seasons for the Eagles from 1971 to 1974.

Following his professional football career, Bailey earned an MBA from the University of South Florida and then worked as an executive in consumer products and wholesale pharmaceuticals and launched an IPO for his own consulting firm corporation.

== Personal life ==
Bailey was married to Susan O'Shea Bailey with whom he raised two children, Erin and Thomas. He resided in Dallas–Fort Worth metroplex area for the majority of his life.

== Death ==
On September 2, 2005, he died in Jacksonville, Florida, from a heart attack and complications from atherosclerosis.
