= Lee Bouggess =

American football player (1948–2024)

- Bouggess in 1972

No. 46
- Position: Running back

Personal information
- Born: January 18, 1948; Louisville, Kentucky, U.S.
- Died: July 4, 2024 (aged 76); Atco, New Jersey, U.S.
- Listed height: 6 ft 2 in (1.88 m)
- Listed weight: 210 lb (95 kg)

Career information
- College: Louisville
- NFL draft: 1970: 3rd round, 59th overall pick

Career history
- Philadelphia Eagles (1970–1973); Charlotte Hornets (1974)

Career NFL statistics
- Games played: 32
- Starts: 19
- Rushing yards: 697 (2.6 average)
- Rushing TDs: 5
- Receiving yards: 589 (7.6 average)
- Receiving TDs: 3
- Stats at Pro Football Reference

Lee Edward Bouggess (January 18, 1948 – July 4, 2024) was an American professional football player who was a running back for three seasons in the National Football League (NFL) for the Philadelphia Eagles from 1970 to 1973. He was selected by the Eagles in the third round of the 1970 NFL draft. He played college football for the Louisville Cardinals.

== College career ==
At Louisville, Bouggess started his career as a defensive end. He performed well enough at that position to be named to the All Missouri Valley Conference team in 1967 and 1968. Before his Senior year, Bouggess was converted to Running Back. In 1969, Bouggess excelled, compiling 6 games of 100 yards or more rushing on his way to a MVC leading 1,064 rushing yards.

== Professional career ==
=== Philadelphia Eagles ===
Bouggess was drafted by the Philadelphia Eagles in the third round of the 1970 NFL draft. As a rookie in 1970, Bouggess had one of the worst seasons ever with a yards-per-carry average of 2.52, the lowest in NFL history. However, he currently ranks sixth for all Eagles rookies with 50 receptions, only behind Keith Jackson (81), DeSean Jackson (62), Don Looney (58), Jeremy Maclin (56) and Charle Young (55). Bouggess would miss the entire 1972 season due to knee injuries.

In his three-year career, Bouggess played in 32 games, but never started in any. He rushed for 697 yards on 271 carries and two touchdowns with an average of 2.6 yards-per-carry. He also caught 78 passes for 589 yards and three touchdowns.

== Death ==
Bouggess died at a care facility in Atco, New Jersey on July 4, 2024, at the age of 76.
