= Billy Walik =

American football player (born 1947)

No. 9
- Position: Wide receiver/Return specialist

Personal information
- Born: November 8, 1947 (age 78); New Haven, Connecticut, U.S.
- Listed height: 5 ft 11 in (1.80 m)
- Listed weight: 180 lb (82 kg)

Career information
- High school: Hopkins School (CT)
- College: Villanova
- NFL draft: 1970: 11th round, 268th overall pick

Career history
- Philadelphia Eagles (1970–1972); Winnipeg Blue Bombers (1973); Florida Blazers (1974); Houston Texans/Shreveport Steamer (1974)

Career NFL statistics
- Receptions: 2
- Receiving yards: 15
- Receiving touchdowns: 1
- Total return yards: 1,770
- Stats at Pro Football Reference

Billy Walik (born November 8, 1947) is a former gridiron football wide receiver and return specialist who played in the National Football League (NFL), the World Football League (WFL) and the Canadian Football League (CFL). He played college football at Villanova.

== College career ==
Walik played three seasons for the Villanova Wildcats. As a senior, he led the Wildcats with 569 rushing yards and seven rushing touchdowns and also had three touchdown receptions. Walik finished his collegiate career with 1,428 yards and 16 touchdowns on 251 carries and 47 receptions for 824 yards and 10 touchdowns. He was also a sprinter on Villanova's track team.

== Professional career ==
Walik was selected 268th overall in the 11th round of the 1970 NFL Draft by the Philadelphia Eagles. As a rookie, Walik returned 32 kickoffs for 805 yards (at the time a team record) and 20 punts for 78 yards while also catching a pass for no gain. He missed six games in 1971 due to a hamstring injury. Walik played in ten games and returned 21 kickoffs for 466 yards and caught a 15-yard touchdown pass against the St. Louis Cardinals in the final game of the season, which also turned out to be the final game of his NFL career. Walik was waived at the end of training camp in 1973. His 1,640 kickoff return yards are the ninth-most in Eagles history.

After being cut by the Eagles, Walik was signed by the Winnipeg Blue Bombers of the Canadian Football League (CFL). Walik was signed by the Florida Blazers of the World Football League. He was traded to the Houston Texans (later the Shreveport Steamer) midway through the season.

== Post-playing career ==
Walik retired from football in 1975 and moved to Bainbridge Island, Washington and has worked as a municipal bonds trader.
