= Bob Creech =

American football player (born 1949)

- Creech in 1972

No. 58, 55
- Position: Linebacker

Personal information
- Born: January 26, 1949 (age 77); Corpus Christi, Texas, U.S.
- Listed height: 6 ft 3 in (1.91 m)
- Listed weight: 218 lb (99 kg)

Career information
- High school: W.B. Ray (Corpus Christi)
- College: Texas Christian University
- NFL draft: 1971: 14th round, 342nd overall pick

Career history
- Philadelphia Eagles (1971–1972); New Orleans Saints (1973)

Career NFL statistics
- Games played: 18
- Starts: 11
- Stats at Pro Football Reference

Bob Creech (born January 26, 1949) is a former National Football League (NFL) football player with the Philadelphia Eagles and New Orleans Saints during the early 1970s.

Creech attended Texas Christian University, where he played NCAA division one football.
