= Rick Arrington =

American football player (1947–2021)

- Arrington in 1972

No. 11
- Position: Quarterback

Personal information
- Born: February 26, 1947; Charlotte, North Carolina, U.S.
- Died: September 7, 2021 (aged 74); Covington, Georgia, U.S.
- Listed height: 6 ft 2 in (1.88 m)
- Listed weight: 200 lb (91 kg)

Career information
- High school: Myers Park (Charlotte, North Carolina)
- College: Georgia (1965–1966); Tulsa (1967–1969)
- NFL draft: 1970: undrafted

Career history
- Philadelphia Eagles (1970–1973)

Career NFL statistics
- Passing attempts: 204
- Passing completions: 97
- Completion percentage: 47.5%
- TD–INT: 3–9
- Passing yards: 950
- Passer rating: 47.6
- Stats at Pro Football Reference

Richard Cameron Arrington (February 26, 1947 – September 7, 2021) was an American professional football player who was a quarterback for the Philadelphia Eagles of the National Football League (NFL). He played three seasons for the Eagles from 1970 to 1973. He played college football at Georgia and Tulsa.

Arrington was born in Charlotte, North Carolina, the son of Hazel (née Cameron; 1925–2013) and Richard Adler Arrington Jr. (1911–1977). Counted amongst the Arrington family's notable ancestors is William Farrar, a gentleman farmer.

Arrington was the father of former ESPN college football sideline reporter Jill Arrington and the grandfather of actresses Dakota and Elle Fanning.

After 35 years of symptoms, Arrington was diagnosed with Stage IV CTE after he died in 2021, at the age of 74. He was one of at least 345 NFL players to be diagnosed after death with this disease, which is caused by repeated hits to the head.
