= Mike Evans (offensive lineman) =

American football player (born 1946)

No. 59
- Position: Center

Personal information
- Born: August 6, 1946 (age 80); Philadelphia, Pennsylvania, U.S.
- Listed height: 6 ft 5 in (1.96 m)
- Listed weight: 250 lb (113 kg)

Career information
- High school: Cranberry Township (PA) North Catholic
- College: Boston College (1964-1967)
- NFL draft: 1968: 9th round, 232nd overall pick

Career history
- Pottstown Firebirds (1968); Philadelphia Eagles (1968–1973); Southern California Sun (1974)

Career NFL statistics
- Games played: 73
- Games started: 62
- Fumble recoveries: 4
- Stats at Pro Football Reference

William Michael Evans (born August 6, 1946) is an American former professional football player who was an offensive lineman for six seasons for the Philadelphia Eagles of the National Football League (NFL). He played college football for the Boston College Eagles and was selected in the ninth round of the 1968 NFL/AFL draft with the 232nd overall pick. He is a member of the Boston College Sports Hall of Fame. Philadelphia Eagles Offensive MVP – 1971. His wife is Kitty and they have three children: Patt, Kelly, Kate.
