= Nate Ramsey =

American football player (1941–2019)

No. 24, 21
- Positions: Safety, Cornerback

Personal information
- Born: July 12, 1941; Neptune Township, New Jersey, U.S.
- Died: March 8, 2019 (aged 77)
- Listed height: 6 ft 1 in (1.85 m)
- Listed weight: 200 lb (91 kg)

Career information
- High school: Neptune
- College: Indiana
- NFL draft: 1963: 14th round, 186th overall pick

Career history
- Philadelphia Eagles (1963–1972); New Orleans Saints (1973)

Career NFL statistics
- Interceptions: 21
- Fumble recoveries: 6
- Total touchdowns: 1
- Stats at Pro Football Reference

Nathan Lee Ramsey (July 12, 1941 – March 8, 2019) was a professional American football safety and cornerback who played for the Philadelphia Eagles for most of his 11-year NFL career from 1963 through 1973. Ramsey was drafted by the Eagles from Indiana University in the fourteenth round (186th overall) of the 1963 NFL draft.

== Early life ==
Ramsey was born on July 12, 1941, in Neptune Township, New Jersey. He was the sixth child of Henry Theodore Ramsey and Nancy Ramsey. He grew up in Asbury Park and Neptune, New Jersey. He attended Neptune High School, where he played basketball and football. Ramsey played running back on the football team, and also played defense and was a punter.

In 1957, as a junior, Ramsey was selected second-team All-Shore at running back by the Asbury Park Press. In 1958, as a senior, he was selected as a Shore Conference second-team All-Star in football, based in large part on interviews with the conference's coaches and writer reviews of the season. However, in another poll the same year, the Asbury Park Press named Ramsey first-team All-Shore on its 26th annual All-Star list. He was also named first-team All-Shore in basketball in 1958 at the end of his junior year. The Asbury Park Press named Ramsey first-team All-Shore in basketball in both 1958 and 1959.

== College career ==
After graduating, Ramsey attended Indiana University in Bloomington on a football scholarship. While at Indiana, he became a member of the Omega Psi Phi fraternity, Zeta Epsilon chapter in 1961. He wore No. 44 on the football team, playing halfback on offense and cornerback on defense. He was considered a distinguished pass defender in the Big Ten during his playing years (1960–1962), and had over a thousand yards from scrimmage on offense, with 18 receptions and 169 rushing attempts during his Indiana career. Over his three varsity seasons, he averaged 4.4 yards per carry rushing, and 15.3 yards per reception. He was team captain in 1962.

He was selected as a member of the Eastern team of college all-stars to play in the June 1963 All-America Bowl.

Future NFL player Marv Woodson played in Indiana's offensive and defensive backfields with Ramsey at Indiana. He was also teammates with future NFL players Tom Nowatzke and Rudy Kuechenberg.

== Professional career ==
In the 1963 NFL draft, the Eagles drafted Ramsey in the 14th round, 186th overall. He became a starting cornerback in 1964, paired with Irv Cross as the other cornerback. Ramsey played defensive back for 10 seasons with the Eagles (1963 to 1972), and one season with the New Orleans Saints (only playing in four games). He was a team captain on the Eagles. In 1964 (5) and 1965 (6), Ramsey led the Eagles in interceptions. He had 21 career interceptions with the Eagles over 134 regular season games played. Three of his 1965 interceptions came in one November game against the St. Louis Cardinals.

== Personal life ==
In 1970, while still playing for the Eagles, Ramsey was shot in the chest on a West Philadelphia street corner. The bullet lodged in his chest, but was not life-threatening, and doctors decided not to remove it. He played all 14 games the following year.

== Death ==
Ramsey died on March 8, 2019.
