= Al Nelson =

American football player (born 1943)

No. 26
- Position: Cornerback

Personal information
- Born: October 27, 1943 (age 83); Cincinnati, Ohio, U.S.
- Listed height: 5 ft 11 in (1.80 m)
- Listed weight: 186 lb (84 kg)

Career information
- College: Cincinnati
- NFL draft: 1965: 3rd round, 35th overall pick
- AFL draft: 1965: 9th round, 72nd overall pick

Career history
- Philadelphia Eagles (1965–1973)

Career NFL statistics
- Games played: 105
- Games started: 27
- Interceptions: 19
- Stats at Pro Football Reference

Albert Nelson (born October 27, 1943) is an American former professional football player who was a cornerback for nine seasons with the Philadelphia Eagles of the National Football League (NFL). He played college football for the Cincinnati Bearcats and was selected in the third round of the 1965 NFL draft. Nelson was also selected in the ninth round of the 1965 AFL draft by the Buffalo Bills.

On September 26, 1971, in the first Eagles game at the newly opened Veterans Stadium, Nelson scored a fourth quarter touchdown on a then-record 102-yard return of a missed field goal by Dallas Cowboys kicker Mike Clark. It was the Eagles' only score of the contest in a lopsided 42–7 loss. The previous holder of the record was his coach at the time Jerry Williams. In the previous off-season, the league had allowed missed field goals kicked into the end zone to be returned. Nelson also returned a missed Lou Groza field goal attempt and ran it back for a 100-yard TD in a game against the Cleveland Browns on December 11, 1966 at Franklin Field in Philadelphia

He is also a member of the Beta Eta chapter of Kappa Alpha Psi fraternity.
