= Ed Khayat =

American football player and coach (1935–2024)

- Khayat in 1972

No. 87, 74, 73
- Positions: End, defensive end, defensive tackle

Personal information
- Born: September 14, 1935; Moss Point, Mississippi, U.S.
- Died: December 6, 2024 (aged 89); Nashville, Tennessee, U.S.
- Listed height: 6 ft 3 in (1.91 m)
- Listed weight: 240 lb (109 kg)

Career information
- High school: Moss Point
- College: Millsaps (1953); Perkinston JC (1954); Tulane (1955–1956)
- NFL draft: 1957: undrafted

Career history

Playing
- Washington Redskins (1957); Philadelphia Eagles (1958–1961); Washington Redskins (1962–1963); Philadelphia Eagles (1964–1965); Boston Patriots (1966)

Coaching
- New Orleans Saints (1967–1970) Defensive line; Philadelphia Eagles (1971–1972) Head coach; Detroit Lions (1973–1974) Defensive line; Atlanta Falcons (1975–1976) Defensive line; Baltimore Colts (1977–1981) Defensive line; Detroit Lions (1982–1984) Defensive line; New England Patriots (1985–1989) Defensive line; New Orleans Night (1991) Head coach; Tampa Bay Buccaneers (1992–1993) Defensive line; Nashville Kats (1997–1998) Head coach; Carolina Cobras (2003) Head coach

Operations
- Nashville Kats (1999–2001) General manager

Awards and highlights
- NFL champion (1960)

Career NFL/AFL statistics
- Fumble recoveries: 6
- Interceptions: 1
- Sacks: 3.5
- Stats at Pro Football Reference

Head coaching record
- Regular season: NFL: 8–15–2 (.360); AFL: 23–29 (.442)
- Coaching profile at Pro Football Reference

Edward Michel Khayat (/ˈkaɪjæt/ KY-yat; September 14, 1935 – December 6, 2024) was an American professional football player and coach in the National Football League (NFL). He spent 10 years as a player (117 game total) and 25 as a coach. He was a starting defensive tackle for the champion Philadelphia Eagles in the 1960 NFL Championship Game and later their head coach in 1971 and 1972. He is a member of six Halls of Fame. He also served on the Former Players Board of Directors of the National Football League Players Association (NFLPA).

== High school ==
Khayat attended Moss Point High School in Moss Point, Mississippi, from 1949 to 1953, where he lettered in football (2), basketball (3), and baseball (3).

== College ==
In 1953, Khayat attended Millsaps College, where he lettered in football and basketball. In 1954, he won the Mississippi Golden Gloves Heavyweight Championship (novice class).

Also in 1954, he won a scholarship to Perkinston Junior College (Mississippi Gulf Coast Community College), where he lettered in football and basketball.

In 1955, he was awarded a scholarship to Tulane University where he lettered in football (2) and baseball (1). He was elected to the All-Time Tulane Green Wave football team in 1979 and the Tulane Green Wave football All-Century Team in 1993.

== Professional ==
In 1957, he was signed as a free agent by the Washington Redskins. His playing career spanned ten years until his retirement after the 1966 season with the Boston Patriots. The bulk of his career was spent with the Philadelphia Eagles, where he was the starting defensive tackle for the 1960 World Championship team.

== Coaching career ==
=== NFL ===
After his retirement from playing, Khayat began his twenty-five-year career in the National Football League as a coach. In 1967, he became the first defensive line coach for the expansion New Orleans Saints, where he coached future Hall of Famer Doug Atkins. In his next stop with the Philadelphia Eagles (1971–1972), he was named Head Coach three games (after Jerry Williams was fired) into the season and rallied the team to a 6-4-1 finish. In an interesting sidelight, he imposed a draconian hair and dress code on the Eagles players during his stint with the Eagles, leading to widespread resentment, including linebacker Tim Rossovich demanding, and getting, a trade (to the San Diego Chargers). In the run-up to the team's November 26, 1972, game against the New York Giants, Khayat "guaranteed" that the Eagles would win the game, despite the fact that the Eagles were a 14-point underdog. The Giants won the game 62-10, and it was widely believed that this sealed his fate in Philadelphia. Three weeks later, after a loss to the St. Louis Cardinals meant that the Eagles finished last in the NFC East, Khayat was fired the next day.

Khayat coached hall of famer Claude Humphrey, (who later played for the Eagles) during his stint as an assistant coach with the Atlanta Falcons (1975–1976). He was also the defensive line coach for the AFC East Champion Baltimore Colts (1977), the AFC Champion New England Patriots (1985) and the AFC East Champion New England Patriots (1986).

=== AFL ===
In 1991, Khayat added coaching in the Arena Football League to his résumé when he became the head coach of the New Orleans Night. In 1997, he took the helm of the Nashville Kats and led them to a 10–4 record. It was only the second time to date that an expansion team had hosted a play-off. He was honored as Arena Football Coach of the Year for guiding the team to a division championship. He retired after the 2003 season as head coach of the Carolina Cobras.

== Personal life and death ==
Born to a Lebanese-American family, Khayat was the first Arab-American head coach in NFL history. His family attended a Methodist church where they sat in the back due to racial discrimination. He and his brother, former Pro Bowl kicker Robert Khayat, played together for the Washington Redskins, and are one of only a few sets of brothers together on the same team. They are both members of the Mississippi Sports Hall of Fame.

Khayat was the recipient of the NFL's Alumni Achievement Award, the National Football Foundation Distinguished American Award, and was the Chancellor Emeritus of the University of Mississippi from 1995 to 2009.

Khayat's son Bill Khayat is a former Honorable Mention All-America tight end at Duke University and, as of 2025, is the head football coach at Brevard College.

In 1988, Khayat continued his long association with Special Olympics when he and former Philadelphia Eagles teammate George Tarasovic co-founded a celebrity golf tournament for the benefit of York County (PA) Special Olympics. Since its inception, the tournament, which was renamed in their honor in 2015, has raised hundreds of thousands of dollars for the benefit of the county's Special Olympics programs.

Khayat died in Nashville, Tennessee, on December 6, 2024, at the age of 89.

== Honors and awards ==
- Mississippi Sportsman of the Year (1971)
- All-Time Tulane Football Team (1979)
- Tulane Green Wave All-Century Team (1993)
- Pennsylvania Chiefs of Police President's Award (1996)
- Arena Football League Coach of the Year (1997)

== Hall of Fame inductions ==
| Hall Of Fame | Year Inducted | Source |
|---|---|---|
| Mississippi Gulf Coast Community College; Alumni Hall of Fame | 1975 | |
| Tulane University Athletic Hall of Fame | 1981 | |
| York Area Sports Hall of Fame | 1992 | |
| Mississippi Gulf Coast Community College; Athletics Hall of Fame | 2003 | |
| Mississippi Sports Hall of Fame | 2004 | |
| Philadelphia Sports Hall of Fame (as member of 1960 Philadelphia Eagles) | 2006 | |

== Head coaching record ==
| Team | Year | Regular season | | | | | Postseason | | | |
| Team | Year | Won | Lost | Ties | Win % | Finish | Won | Lost | Win % | Result |
|---|---|---|---|---|---|---|---|---|---|---|
| PHI | 1971 | 6 | 4 | 1 | .600 | 3rd in NFC East | – | – | – | – |
| PHI | 1972 | 2 | 11 | 1 | .179 | 5th in NFC East | – | – | – | – |
| PHI total | | 8 | 15 | 2 | .354 | | – | – | – | – |
| NFL total | | 8 | 15 | 2 | .354 | | – | – | – | – |
| Total | | 8 | 15 | 2 | .354 | | – | – | – | – |

== See also ==
- List of American Football League players
