= Jerry Williams (gridiron football) =

American gridiron football player and coach (1923–1998)

- Williams in 1960

No. 33, 22, 49
- Positions: Running back, defensive back

Personal information
- Born: November 1, 1923; Spokane, Washington, U.S.
- Died: December 31, 1998 (aged 75); Chandler, Arizona, U.S.
- Listed height: 5 ft 10 in (1.78 m)
- Listed weight: 175 lb (79 kg)

Career information
- High school: North Central (Spokane)
- College: Washington State; Idaho
- NFL draft: 1949: 7th round, 63rd overall pick

Career history

Playing
- Los Angeles Rams (1949–1952); Philadelphia Eagles (1953–1954)

Coaching
- Montana (1955–1957) Head coach; Philadelphia Eagles (1957–1963) Defensive coordinator/Defensive backs; Calgary Stampeders (1965–1968) Head coach; Philadelphia Eagles (1969–1971) Head coach; Cleveland Browns (1971) Running backs; Hamilton Tiger-Cats (1972–1975) Head coach; Calgary Stampeders (1981) Head coach

Awards and highlights
- 2× NFL champion (1951, 1960); First-team All-PCC (1948); Annis Stukus Trophy (1967)

Career NFL statistics
- Rushing yards: 910
- Rushing average: 5.3
- Receptions: 91
- Receiving yards: 1,278
- Total touchdowns: 18
- Stats at Pro Football Reference

Head coaching record
- Regular season: CFL: 71–55–2 (.563); NFL: 7–22–2 (.258); College: 6–23 (.207)
- Postseason: CFL: 7–8 (.467)
- Career: CFL: 78–63–2 (.552); NFL: 7–22–2 (.258); College: 6–23 (.207)
- Coaching profile at Pro Football Reference

Jerry Ralph Williams (November 1, 1923 – December 31, 1998) was an American football player and coach who served as the head coach of two Canadian Football League (CFL) teams, as well as the Philadelphia Eagles of the National Football League (NFL).

== Early life ==
Williams was a native of Spokane, Washington. He attended North Central High School where he was an all-city running back and All-Inland Empire Athlete of the Year (1942) as a three-sport athlete. Graduating in 1942, Williams enrolled at the University of Idaho, but with the war efforts building he made the decision to join his older brother, William H. Williams (eventual Chief Justice of the Washington State Supreme Court) in the United States Army Air Corps. Williams became a fighter pilot flying P-38s in the Pacific theater. One of his most notable missions was as a fighter escort to both Japanese and American dignitaries traveling to Tokyo Bay and the peace signing on the USS Missouri in 1945. Returning from the war efforts, Williams enrolled at Washington State University, where he played both offense and defensive halfback for the Cougars from 1946 to 1948. He set the Pacific Coast Conference kickoff return record and led the Cougars in total offense in his senior season at WSU. Most notable was a punt return of 97 yards against Oregon in 1947 and kickoff returns of 88 and 87 yards against Montana and California. In Williams' senior season (1948) he earned All-Coast honors accumulating 1,500 all-purpose yards. He participated in both the East–West Shrine Game and College All-Star Classic before joining the Los Angeles Rams of the National Football League (NFL).

== Professional career ==
=== Playing career ===
Drafted in the seventh round of the 1949 NFL draft by the Los Angeles Rams, Williams played four seasons with the team, seeing most of his action as a defensive back. During his first three seasons the Rams made three consecutive trips to the NFL title game winning the 1951 NFL Championship.

In his first season Williams intercepted five passes. The most memorable image of his Rams career however came in the 1951 regular season finale against the Green Bay Packers on December 16. Following a missed Packer field goal Williams returned the attempt 99 yards for a touchdown, a record that stood until the 1971 season when Williams coached, Al Nelson had a 102-yard missed field goal return, when rule changes allowed for missed field goal attempts into the end zone to be returned.

Williams' desire to play on the offensive side of the ball led to his request to be traded and on May 12, 1953, Williams was sent to the Philadelphia Eagles. He proceeded to lead the Eagles in total offense during his first season and in his two years caught 75 passes, rushed for over 500 yards and scored eight touchdowns. Williams served in the capacity of player-coach in 1954 before leaving the playing field for the coaching ranks.

=== Coaching career ===
Officially entering the coaching ranks the following year Williams became the head coach at the University of Montana where in three seasons his teams, while known for their competitiveness went 6–21 overall. Football wasn't the only endeavor that led to close calls for Williams as he escaped with his life on two separate occasions during harrowing crash landings of small aircraft. While piloting a private plane on May 24, 1956, Williams and assistant Lauri Niemi were knocked unconscious in a crash near the Idaho/Montana border when they were forced, through bad weather, to attempt a landing on a rural mountain road. And again on October 3, 1957, Williams with 14 of his players, while en route to Provo, Utah to face the Brigham Young Cougars, were forced down for yet another emergency landing.

After the 1957 season Williams returned to Philadelphia to serve as the Philadelphia Eagles defensive back coach under head coach Buck Shaw with the team capturing the 1960 NFL Championship in a thrilling 17–13 victory over Vince Lombardi's Green Bay Packers. It was also during this season that Williams came up with one of his most notable contributions to the game, devising the "nickel" defensive scheme, a scheme still employed by most football programs today. Shaw retired after the 1960 season but new coach Nick Skorich kept Williams on his staff until their dismissal at the conclusion of the 1963 season.

New ownership and the arrival of a new coach and general manager in Joe Kuharich led to Williams accepting an assistant coaching position with the Calgary Stampeders of the Canadian Football League (CFL). Williams earned a law degree from Temple University while he was with the Eagles, before moving to Calgary as an assistant in 1953. Shortly after the conclusion of the 1964 season Williams was elevated to head coach and compiled a 40–23–1 record over the next four years. He earned CFL Coach of the Year honors in 1967. His teams reached the playoffs three times and competed in the 1968 Grey Cup (the first time in 19 years)

On May 9, 1969, after another ownership change in Philadelphia, Williams was hired as the Eagles new head coach. While building a competitive team with minimal talent Williams endured but a 7–22–2 record during his first two seasons. After promises by owner Leonard Tose to honor William's 3-year contract Tose released Williams after just the first three games of the '71 pre-season. Tose was the recipient of Williams' parting disdain calling the owner "a man without courage or character", words that would likely cost Williams a second head coaching opportunity in the NFL. Williams was replaced by Ed Khayat, and finished the 1971 season as an assistant with the Cleveland Browns.

On January 19, 1972, Williams returned to the CFL when he was named head coach of the Hamilton Tiger-Cats. In just his first season the Ti-Cats reached the pinnacle of Canadian professional football, winning the Grey Cup in a 13–10 thriller over the Western Conference champion Saskatchewan Roughriders. Williams resigned after four seasons with the Tiger-Cats on December 12, 1975, following a 5–10–1 season. In his four years with Hamilton, Williams compiled a 30–29–1 record and a Grey Cup title.

After briefly turning to ranching in Arizona, Williams made one last foray into football, returning as offensive coordinator with the Calgary Stampeders. He was later promoted to head coach on October 5, 1981, upon the firing of Ardell Wiegandt but once again retired from coaching football after that season, finishing out the 1981 season with a 1–3 record (the Stampeders finished 6–10 overall). He returned to Arizona to become part owner in a flight charter service and enjoy retirement in Prescott and later, Chandler.

== Death ==
In 1990 Jerry was diagnosed with a rare form of leukemia and spent two months in the hospital eventually making a full recovery. By 1998 however his health began to fail and on December 31 he died in Chandler, Arizona with his wife, middle son and youngest daughter by his side.

== See also ==
- List of NCAA major college yearly punt and kickoff return leaders
