= 1971 NFL season =

American football season

Regular season
- Duration: September 19 – December 19, 1971

Playoffs
- Start date: December 25, 1971
- AFC Champions: Miami Dolphins
- NFC Champions: Dallas Cowboys

Super Bowl VI
- Date: January 16, 1972
- Site: Tulane Stadium, New Orleans, Louisiana
- Champions: Dallas Cowboys

Pro Bowl
- Date: January 23, 1972
- Site: Los Angeles Memorial Coliseum

AFC teams: West, Central, East
NFC teams: West, Central, East

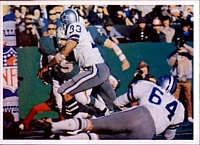
The Cowboys playing against the Dolphins in Super Bowl VI.

The 1971 NFL season was the 52nd regular season of the National Football League. The Boston Patriots changed their name to New England Patriots to widen their appeal to the entire New England region after moving to their new stadium in Foxborough, Massachusetts, located between Boston and Providence, Rhode Island.

The season ended with Super Bowl VI when the Dallas Cowboys defeated the Miami Dolphins 24–3 at Tulane Stadium in New Orleans. The Pro Bowl took place on January 23, 1972, at the Los Angeles Memorial Coliseum; the AFC beat the NFC 26–13.

== Draft ==
The 1971 NFL draft was held January 28–29 at New York City's Belmont Plaza Hotel. With the first pick, the New England Patriots selected quarterback Jim Plunkett, the Heisman Trophy winner from Stanford University. The next two selections were also quarterbacks: Archie Manning and Dan Pastorini.

== New officials ==
Three referees--Walt Fitzgerald, Bob Finley and George Rennix--retired following the 1970 season.

Finley and Fitzgerald officiated all ten seasons of the American Football League's existence. Finley was the referee for the 1968 "Heidi Game" between the Jets and Raiders, and Fitzgerald was the referee for the AFL Championship Game between the same two teams six weeks later.

Rennix was the referee for the 1961 NFL Championship Game, where Green Bay routed the New York Giants 37-0 for the Packers' first of five league championships in seven seasons under legendary coach Vince Lombardi.

Bob Frederic, Dick Jorgensen and Fred Wyant were promoted to fill those vacancies. Frederic was the back judge on Jack Vest's crew in 1970, Jorgensen the line judge on Rennix's crew, and Wyant the line judge on Ben Dreith's crew. Ironically, Dreith and Wyant were demoted from referee to line judge simultaneously following the 1989 season.

Rich Eichhorst, a back judge on Bernie Ulman's crew in 1970, resigned to concentrate on officiating college basketball; he was replaced by Don Orr, who officiated in the league through 1995; Orr also wore number 77, the same as Eichhorst. Ben Tompkins replaced Eichhorst on Ulman's crew.

Also hired this season was future referee Gene Barth, who was placed on Jim Tunney's crew as line judge. Barth officiated in the NFL for 20 seasons, 16 as a referee, highlighted by his assignment to Super Bowl XVIII following the 1983 season. Barth assumed number 14, which Finley previously wore.

== Major rule changes ==
- Teams will not be charged a time out for an injured player unless the injury occurs inside the last two minutes of a half or overtime (since 1974).
- Missed field goal attempts which cross the goal line can be run back. Previously, only those which fell short of the goal line could be returned; those which broke the plane of the goal line resulted in an automatic touchback.

== Deaths ==
- September 5 - George Trafton, age 74. Center for the Chicago Bears from 1920-1932. Elected to the Pro Football Hall Of Fame in 1964.
- October 24 - Chuck Hughes, age 28. Wide receiver, Detroit Lions. Died shortly after catching a pass in a game against the Chicago Bears. Hughes was the last player to die during an NFL game.
  - Lions players wore a black armband on their jerseys to honor Hughes for the season's remaining eight games.
- November 27 - Joe Guyon, age 79. Wing back for the New York Giants and Oorang Indians, elected to the pro football hall of fame in 1966.

== Division races ==
Starting in 1970, and until 2002, there were three divisions (Eastern, Central and Western) in each conference. The winners of each division, and a fourth “wild card” team based on the best non-division winner, qualified for the playoffs. The tiebreaker rules were changed to start with head-to-head competition, followed by division records, record against common opponents, and records in conference play. More tiebreakers were provided in 1971 because, in 1970, reversing just one game’s outcome would have led to a coin toss between Dallas and Detroit for the NFC wild card berth.

Teams listed with an asterisk in these tables are leaders on tiebreak

=== National Football Conference ===
Week	Eastern		Central		Western		Wild Card	
1	3 teams	1–0–0	2 teams	1–0–0	2 teams	1–0–0	3 teams	1–0–0
2	2 teams	2–0–0	Chicago	2–0–0	Atlanta	1–0–1	2 teams	2–0–0
3	Washington	3–0–0	4 teams	2–1–0	San Francisco	2–1–0	5 teams	2–1–0
4	Washington	4–0–0	Chicago*	3–1–0	Los Angeles	2–1–1	3 teams	3–1–0
5	Washington	5–0–0	Minnesota*	4–1–0	Los Angeles	3–1–1	Detroit	4–1–0
6	Washington	5–1–0	Minnesota	5–1–0	Los Angeles	4–1–1	4 teams	4–2–0
7	Washington	6–1–0	Minnesota	6–1–0	San Francisco	5–2–0	Chicago	5–2–0
8	Washington	6–1–1	Minnesota	6–2–0	San Francisco	6–2–0	Detroit	5–2–1
9	Washington	6–2–1	Minnesota	7–2–0	San Francisco	6–3–0	Chicago*	6–3–0
10	Dallas	7–3–0	Minnesota	8–2–0	Los Angeles	6–3–1	Washington*	6–3–1
11	Dallas	8–3–0	Minnesota	9–2–0	San Francisco	7–4–0	Washington*	7–3–1
12	Dallas	9–3–0	Minnesota	9–3–0	Los Angeles	7–4–1	Washington	8–3–1
13	Dallas	10–3–0	Minnesota	10–3–0	San Francisco	8–5–0	Washington	9–3–1
14	Dallas	11–3–0	Minnesota	11–3–0	San Francisco	9–5–0	Washington	9–4–1

=== American Football Conference ===
Week	Eastern		Central		Western		Wild Card	
1	2 teams	1–0–0	2 teams	1–0–0	San Diego	1–0–0	2 teams	1–0–0
2	Miami	1–0–1	Cleveland	2–0–0	Oakland*	1–1–0	6 teams	1–1–0
3	Baltimore	2–1–0	Pittsburgh*	2–1–0	Oakland*	2–1–0	2 teams	2–1–0
4	Baltimore	3–1–0	Cleveland	3–1–0	Oakland*	3–1–0	Kansas City	3–1–0
5	Baltimore	4–1–0	Cleveland	4–1–0	Oakland*	4–1–0	Kansas City	4–1–0
6	Miami	4–1–1	Cleveland	4–2–0	Oakland*	5–1–0	Kansas City	5–1–0
7	Miami	5–1–1	Cleveland	4–3–0	Oakland*	5–1–1	Kansas City	5–1–1
8	Miami	6–1–1	Cleveland*	4–4–0	Oakland	5–1–2	Baltimore	6–2–0
9	Miami	7–1–1	Cleveland*	4–5–0	Oakland	6–1–2	Baltimore	7–2–0
10	Miami	8–1–1	Cleveland*	5–5–0	Oakland	7–1–2	Kansas City	7–2–1
11	Miami	9–1–1	Cleveland	6–5–0	Oakland	7–2–2	Baltimore	8–3–0
12	Miami	9–2–1	Cleveland	7–5–0	Kansas City	8–3–1	Baltimore	9–3–0
13	Baltimore	10–3–0	Cleveland	8–5–0	Kansas City	9–3–1	Miami	9–3–1
14	Miami	10–3–1	Cleveland	9–5–0	Kansas City	10–3–1	Baltimore	10–4–0

== Final standings ==
AFC East
	W	L	T	PCT	DIV	CONF	PF	PA	STK
Miami Dolphins	10	3	1	.769	5–3	7–3–1	315	174	W1
Baltimore Colts	10	4	0	.714	6–2	8–3	313	140	L1
New England Patriots	6	8	0	.429	4–4	6–5	238	325	W1
New York Jets	6	8	0	.429	4–4	6–5	212	299	W2
Buffalo Bills	1	13	0	.071	1–7	1–10	184	394	L3

AFC Central
	W	L	T	PCT	DIV	CONF	PF	PA	STK
Cleveland Browns	9	5	0	.643	5–1	7–4	285	273	W5
Pittsburgh Steelers	6	8	0	.429	4–2	5–6	246	292	L1
Houston Oilers	4	9	1	.308	2–4	4–7	251	330	W3
Cincinnati Bengals	4	10	0	.286	1–5	3–8	284	265	L3

AFC West
	W	L	T	PCT	DIV	CONF	PF	PA	STK
Kansas City Chiefs	10	3	1	.769	4–1–1	8–2–1	302	208	W3
Oakland Raiders	8	4	2	.667	4–1–1	7–3–1	344	278	W1
San Diego Chargers	6	8	0	.429	2–4	4–7	311	341	L1
Denver Broncos	4	9	1	.308	1–5	3–6–1	203	275	L2

Note: Tie games were not officially counted in the standings until 1972.

NFC East
	W	L	T	PCT	DIV	CONF	PF	PA	STK
Dallas Cowboys	11	3	0	.786	7–1	8–3	406	222	W7
Washington Redskins	9	4	1	.692	6–1–1	8–2–1	276	190	L1
Philadelphia Eagles	6	7	1	.462	4–3–1	5–5–1	221	302	W3
St. Louis Cardinals	4	9	1	.308	1–7	2–8–1	231	279	L2
New York Giants	4	10	0	.286	1–7	3–8	228	362	L5

NFC Central
	W	L	T	PCT	DIV	CONF	PF	PA	STK
Minnesota Vikings	11	3	0	.786	5–1	9–2	245	139	W2
Detroit Lions	7	6	1	.538	2–3–1	3–6–1	341	286	L2
Chicago Bears	6	8	0	.429	2–4	5–6	185	276	L5
Green Bay Packers	4	8	2	.333	2–3–1	2–7–2	274	298	L1

NFC West
	W	L	T	PCT	DIV	CONF	PF	PA	STK
San Francisco 49ers	9	5	0	.643	2–4	7–4	300	216	W2
Los Angeles Rams	8	5	1	.615	4–1–1	7–3–1	313	260	W1
Atlanta Falcons	7	6	1	.538	3–2–1	4–6–1	274	277	W1
New Orleans Saints	4	8	2	.333	2–4	4–7	266	347	L3

=== Tiebreakers ===
- New England finished ahead of N.Y. Jets in the AFC East based on better point differential in head-to-head games, 13 points.

== Playoffs ==
Note: Prior to the 1975 season, the home teams in the playoffs were decided based on a yearly rotation of division winners. Had the playoffs been seeded, the divisional round matchups would have been #3 Cleveland at #2 Miami and #4 wild card Baltimore at #1 Kansas City in the AFC; #4 wild card Washington at #1 Minnesota and #3 San Francisco at #2 Dallas in the NFC (since the Cowboys and Vikings both had 11-3 records and did not play during the regular season, the tiebreaker would have been conference record. Minnesota was 9-2 vs. NFC teams compared to Dallas' 8-3).

Dec 26 – Candlestick Park
WC	Washington	20
Jan 2 – Texas Stadium
West	San Francisco	24
NFC
West	San Francisco	3
Dec 25 – Metropolitan Stadium
East	Dallas	14
NFC Championship
East	Dallas	20
Jan 16 – Tulane Stadium
Cent.	Minnesota	12
Divisional round
NFC	Dallas	24
Dec 26 – Cleveland Stadium
AFC	Miami	3
Super Bowl VI
WC	Baltimore	20
Jan 2 – Miami Orange Bowl
Cent.	Cleveland	3
AFC
WC	Baltimore	0
Dec 25 – Municipal Stadium
East	Miami	21
AFC Championship
East	Miami	27**
West	Kansas City	24

** Indicates double overtime victory

== Awards ==
Most Valuable Player	Alan Page, defensive tackle, Minnesota
Coach of the Year	George Allen, Washington
Defensive Player of the Year	Alan Page, defensive tackle, Minnesota
Offensive Rookie of the Year	John Brockington, running back, Green Bay
Defensive Rookie of the Year	Isiah Robertson, linebacker, Los Angeles

== Coaching changes ==
=== Offseason ===
- Buffalo Bills: John Rauch resigned and was replaced by Harvey Johnson, who previously served as the team's interim head coach in 1968.
- Cleveland Browns: Blanton Collier resigned and was replaced by Nick Skorich.
- Green Bay Packers: Phil Bengtson was fired and replaced by Dan Devine.
- Houston Oilers: Wally Lemm resigned and was replaced by Ed Hughes.
- Los Angeles Rams: Tommy Prothro became the Rams' new head coach after George Allen left the team.
- New England Patriots: John Mazur began his first full season as Patriots head coach. He replaced Clive Rush after seven games into the 1970 season for medical reasons.
- New Orleans Saints: J. D. Roberts began his first full season as Saints head coach. He replaced Tom Fears, who was fired after a 1-5-1 start in 1970.
- St. Louis Cardinals: Bob Hollway replaced Charley Winner.
- San Diego Chargers: Sid Gillman returned to the field after sitting out half of the 1969 season and all of the 1970 season due to poor health.
- Washington Redskins: George Allen was named as Washington's head coach. Vince Lombardi was diagnosed with terminal cancer in late June before the 1970 season, dying on September 3. Offensive line coach Bill Austin served as Washington's head coach for 1970.

=== In-season ===
- Denver Broncos: Lou Saban left the team after a 2–6–1 start. Offensive line coach Jerry Smith served as interim for the remaining five games.
- Philadelphia Eagles: Jerry Williams was fired after three games. Ed Khayat was named as replacement.
- San Diego Chargers: Sid Gillman again left the field after serving as head coach for 10 games. Harland Svare replaced Gilman.

== Stadium changes ==
- The newly renamed New England Patriots moved from Harvard Stadium in Boston to their new home field, Schaefer Stadium in Foxborough, Massachusetts.
- The Chicago Bears moved their home games from Wrigley Field to Soldier Field.
  - The Bears played their 1970 home opener vs. the Eagles at Northwestern University's Dyche Stadium, but their request to move there full-time was rejected by the city of Evanston and the Big Ten Conference.
- The Philadelphia Eagles moved their games from Franklin Field to Veterans Stadium.
  - The Eagles were scheduled to move to the new facility in South Philadelphia in 1970, but labor strikes and bad weather caused numerous construction delays.
- The San Francisco 49ers moved from Kezar Stadium into Candlestick Park.
- The Dallas Cowboys moved after their first two regular season home games from the Cotton Bowl to Texas Stadium.
- 11 teams played their home games on artificial turf in 1971. This was up from 7 teams in the NFL in 1970. The teams were: Chicago, Cincinnati, Dallas, Houston, Miami, New England, New Orleans, Philadelphia, Pittsburgh, St. Louis and San Francisco.

== Uniform changes ==
- The Atlanta Falcons switched their primary jerseys from black to red.
- The Chicago Bears adopted a second white jersey with block numbers, which was worn four of the five games in which the Bears wore white jerseys. Also, a second navy blue jersey without sleeve stripes was added for warm weather games.
- The New York Jets wore a modified white jersey in the first half of the season which did not have green stripes over the shoulders.
- The Oakland Raiders switched from silver to black numbers on their white jerseys.
- The San Francisco 49ers added alternate jerseys with no striping or TV numbers for hot games.

== Television ==
This was the second year under the league's four-year broadcast contracts with ABC, CBS, and NBC to televise Monday Night Football, the NFC package, and the AFC package, respectively. Frank Gifford's contract with CBS expired. He was then hired by ABC to serve as play-by-play announcer for MNF, while Keith Jackson returned to call college football for the network. Jack Whitaker and Pat Summerall replaced Gifford as hosts on The NFL Today, which was still a pre-recorded pregame show. At NBC, Al DeRogatis and Kyle Rote swapped color commentator positions, with DeRogatis joining Curt Gowdy as the network's lead broadcast team and Rote joining Jim Simpson at #2.
