= 1967 Oregon State Beavers football team =

American college football season

1967 Oregon State Beavers football
- Conference: Athletic Association of Western Universities

Ranking
- Coaches: No. 8
- AP: No. 7
- Record: 7–2–1 (4–1–1 AAWU)
- Head coach: Dee Andros (3rd season)
- Captains: Dave Marlette; Skip Vanderbundt
- Home stadium: Parker Stadium; Civic Stadium

1967 Athletic Association of Western Universities football standings
	Conf.					Overall
Team	W		L		T	W		L		T
No. 1 USC $	6	–	1	–	0	10	–	1	–	0
No. 7 Oregon State	4	–	1	–	1	7	–	2	–	1
UCLA	4	–	1	–	1	7	–	2	–	1
Stanford	3	–	4	–	0	5	–	5	–	0
Washington	3	–	4	–	0	5	–	5	–	0
California	2	–	3	–	0	5	–	5	–	0
Oregon	1	–	5	–	0	2	–	8	–	0
Washington State	1	–	5	–	0	2	–	8	–	0
$ – Conference champion; Rankings from AP Poll

The 1967 Oregon State Beavers football team represented Oregon State University in the 1967 NCAA University Division football season. The Beavers ended this season with seven wins, two losses, and a tie, and outscored their opponents 187 to 137. Led by third-year head coach Dee Andros, Oregon State finished with 7–2–1 record, 4–1–1 in the Athletic Association of Western Universities (informally Pacific-8, a name it officially adopted the following year) tied for runner-up for a second consecutive year.

In a four-week period, the Beavers became the only team to ever go undefeated against three top two teams in one season since the inception of the AP poll, earning the nickname "Giant Killers."

== Schedule ==
Date	Opponent	Rank	Site	Result	Attendance	Source
September 16	Stanford		Civic Stadium; Portland, OR	W 13–7	22,570	
September 23	at Arizona State*		Sun Devil Stadium; Tempe, AZ	W 27–21	37,051	
September 30	at Iowa*		Iowa Stadium; Iowa City, IA	W 38–18	48,313	
October 7	at Washington		Husky Stadium; Seattle, WA	L 6–13	55,000	
October 14	BYU*		Parker Stadium; Corvallis, OR	L 13–31	22,322	
October 21	at No. 2 Purdue*		Ross–Ade Stadium; West Lafayette, IN	W 22–14	60,147	
October 28	Washington State^{†}		Parker Stadium; Corvallis, OR	W 35–7	18,115	
November 4	at No. 2 UCLA		Los Angeles Memorial Coliseum; Los Angeles, CA	T 16–16	50,172	
November 11	No. 1 USC		Parker Stadium; Corvallis, OR	W 3–0	41,494	
November 18	at Oregon	No. 8	Autzen Stadium; Eugene, OR (Civil War)	W 14–10	40,100	
*Non-conference game; ^{†}Homecoming; Rankings from AP Poll released prior to the game

== Game summaries ==
=== Before the season ===
Oregon State ended the 1966 season on a six-game winning streak. Nobody expected much out of the Beavers in 1967; even the Oregon State media guide said that the Beavers would be "rebuilding" in 1967. Quarterback Paul Brothers, who led Oregon State to the Rose Bowl as a sophomore after the 1964 season, and fullback Pete Pifer, the Beavers' all-time leading rusher, had graduated. The starting quarterback was junior Steve Preece, the wunderkind Andros had recruited from Boise, Idaho, shortly after he arrived at Oregon State. Another newcomer on offense was junior fullback Bill "Earthquake" Enyart, who previously backed up Pifer. Too talented to keep off the field, Enyart had earned All-Coast honors at linebacker in 1966. The 1967 team only boasted six seniors.

=== Stanford ===
	1	2	3	4	Total
Indians	0	7	0	0	7
Beavers	0	13	0	0	13

Stanford made their first trip to Portland, Oregon, in 12 years. Oregon State and Stanford met for the first time in three years, when the Indians almost derailed the Beavers' Rose Bowl trip. Oregon State entered the game a one-point favorite. In the second quarter, the Beavers' Billy Main opened scoring by running in untouched from five yards out. Mike Haggard's extra point gave Oregon State a 7–0 lead. The lead lasted all of fifteen seconds, as Stanford's Nate Kirtman returned the kickoff 98 yards for a touchdown, knotting the score at seven. Six minutes later, a ten-yard punt return by Mark Waletich gave the Beavers the ball at the Indians' 39. Oregon State drove 34 yards to set up Mike Haggard's 22-yard field goal with less than three minutes left. On the ensuing kickoff, Stanford's Gene Washington mistakenly downed the ball at his own one-yard line. The Indians could only manage four yards and Stanford could only manage a 10-yard punt. The Beavers could only manage four yards themselves, but Haggard's 28-yard field goal gave Oregon State a 13–7 lead with just over a minute left in the first half. In the second half, Stanford could only muster a 44-yard field goal attempt, which fell short of the crossbar. The Beavers' Skip Vanderbundt killed off three drives with interceptions. His second was with less than five minutes left. His last was at the Oregon State 16 with 1:25 left, which effectively ended the game. The Beavers did not win another season opener for a decade, under second-year head coach Craig Fertig.

=== Arizona State ===
	1	2	3	4	Total
Beavers	7	7	6	7	27
Sun Devils	6	0	8	7	21

In 102 °F (39 °C) heat, Andros summed up the playing conditions by saying, "It's hot as hell." Arizona State caught the first break, recovering an Oregon State fumble at the Beaver 20. Oregon State's Mike Groff ended the threat by intercepting Ed Roseborough at the Beaver 15. Six plays later, Steve Preece dove in the end zone for a 7–0 lead. The Sun Devils responded by driving 63 yards for a touchdown of their own but missed the extra point. Late in the second quarter, Oregon State's Don Summers ran in from one yard and Mike Haggard's extra point split the uprights. The Beavers went into the locker room up 14–6.

In the first four minutes of the second half, Oregon State extended the lead on Preece's six-yard touchdown, but Haggard's extra point was blocked. In the third quarter, Arizona State benched Roseborough in favor of Rick Shaw. Shaw led the Sun Devils on a 47-yard drive and hit J. D. Hill for a two-point conversion to pull within six. Midway through the fourth quarter, Preece ran in for his third touchdown of the game. Arizona State countered with a late touchdown to make the score a more-respectable 27–21 but never seriously threatened after that. The Sun Devils went 8–1 the rest of the way, only losing by two to undefeated Wyoming, which finished No. 6 in the AP poll, one spot in front of the Beavers.

=== Iowa ===
	1	2	3	4	Total
Beavers	21	10	7	0	38
Hawkeyes	0	0	6	12	18

In the seventeen seasons from 1956 to 1972, Oregon State and Iowa played 12 times, more times than Oregon State played conference opponents California and UCLA in the same period. The Hawkeyes won the first five meetings, but the Beavers won the sixth 17–3 in 1966. In the first seven minutes, Oregon State built a 14–0 lead. Steve Preece scored the first, running untouched into the end zone from 35 yards out. Billy Main scored the second by dragging two defenders into the end zone. Main tacked on a second touchdown from 40 yards out later in the quarter. The Beavers had a chance to add another first-quarter touchdown but fumbled at the one. Oregon State got the ball back at their own six and drove 94 yards on 11 plays. Bill Enyart's two-yard second quarter plunge put the Beavers up 28–0. Mike Haggard tacked on a 27-yard field goal for a 31–0 halftime lead. Iowa managed to outscore Oregon State 18–7 in the second half, although the Hawkeyes' final touchdown came with three seconds left. The nine-game winning streak remains the Beavers longest since 1962–1963.

=== Washington ===
	1	2	3	4	Total
Beavers	6	0	0	0	6
Huskies	0	6	0	7	13

By the time Oregon State arrived in Seattle, the season was already beginning to take its toll on the Beavers. Defensive starters, Harry Gunner and Mark Waletich, were sidelined. Gary Houser was unable to play tight end but still managed to perform his punting duties. Oregon State fumbled on its second play from scrimmage. Washington drove to the six before Charlie Olds came up with an interception in the end zone. The Beavers subsequently drove 80 yards in 14 plays for a touchdown, capped off by Steve Preece's one-yard plunge. Mike Haggard shanked the extra point, one of only three missed extra points in 1967, to keep the score 6–0. The Huskies responded by driving 72 yards to set up a 21-yard field goal to pull within three. Late in the half, a bad punt was nullified because the Beavers were called for clipping; instead of Oregon State getting the ball at their own 42, Washington took over at the Beaver 36. The Huskies drove 27 yards in five plays to set up a 26-yard field goal, which sent the teams into the locker rooms tied at six. Neither team threatened until the fourth quarter. The Beavers fumbled at their 35. From there, Washington's Carl Wojchiechowski ran in from 18-yards out with two minutes left to win 13–6.

=== BYU ===
	1	2	3	4	Total
Cougars	7	10	0	14	31
Beavers	7	0	0	6	13

BYU was 2–1. Their only loss was to undefeated Wyoming. Wyoming finished the season No. 6 in the AP poll. The Cougars had defeated New Mexico and West Michigan by a combined 55 points. On Oregon State's second play from scrimmage, Steve Preece was intercepted. Eight plays later, the Cougars were up 7–0. Later in the quarter, Don Whitley intercepted a BYU pass and returned it to the Cougar two. On the next play, Bill Enyart plowed in for a touchdown, knotting the score at seven. The Beavers’ best drives in the second quarter ended on a fumble and a missed 50-yard field goal. BYU scored on a 40-yard field goal with less than three minutes left to take a 10–7 lead. They tacked on a 68-yard touchdown pass to take a 10-point lead into halftime.

Early in the fourth quarter, the Cougars added another touchdown for a 24–7 lead. BYU was driving again in the fourth quarter, but Mark Waletich came up with an interception at the Oregon State two yard-line. The Beavers drove 98 yards, including a 31-yard touchdown pass from Preece to Billy Main to pull within 11. The Beavers’ best drive after that point ended after an interception. After Oregon State's defense forced a punt, the Beavers’ next drive ended when Preece's pass bounced off a receiver's helmet and was intercepted by Bobby Smith. Smith returned the interception 27 yards for a touchdown to wrap up the BYU victory. Oregon State committed 11 turnovers in the game, one fewer than the 12 the Beavers committed over the next five games.

=== Purdue ===
	1	2	3	4	Total
Beavers	7	3	3	9	22
Boilermakers	7	0	7	0	14

Entering the game, three undefeated teams topped the AP poll: the Trojans, the Boilermakers, and the Bruins. All three were on the Beavers’ schedule over the next four weeks. The first was #2 Purdue, the defending Rose Bowl champions on a nine-game winning streak. In 1967, the Boilermakers started the season beating Texas A&M in Texas and #1 Notre Dame. The week before Oregon State came to West Lafayette, Purdue beat Ohio State 41–6 in Columbus. The win remains the largest by any team over the Buckeyes in Ohio Stadium since 1946.

Purdue's stars were Mike Phipps at quarterback, Jim Beirne at end and Leroy Keyes at cornerback, running back, and punt and kick returner. Keyes was the nation's leading scorer in 1967 and would finish third in the Heisman balloting in 1967 and second in 1968. In both years, he was an All-American at both cornerback and running back. He appeared on the cover of Sports Illustrated's 1968 college football preview. In 1987, he was voted the all-time greatest Purdue football player. In 2004, College Football News voted him the 86th best football player of all time. Entering the game, Phipps led the nation in total offense. Phipps would finish second in the Heisman balloting in 1970. Beirne was an All-American in 1967 and actually broke the Purdue all-time record for receptions during the game. The Boilermaker faithful did not give the Beavers much of a chance, erecting tombstones with the Oregon State players’ names on them. The Beaver coaches made sure to drive the Oregon State bus past them the day before the game. Purdue entered the game 20-point favorites.

The day before the game, the voice of Oregon State football, Bob Blackburn was at a tuxedo-required event in Seattle. After the event ended, he realized that he would not have time to change before his flight, so he flew to Indiana and called the game in his tuxedo.

Oregon State's first drive went 82 yards, ending in a touchdown on an 18-yard touchdown pass from Steve Preece to a wide-open Roger Cantlon for a 7–0 lead. The Boilermakers took less than two minutes to drive 62-yards for their own touchdown on Keyes’ 15-yard run to tie the game at seven with more than ten minutes left in the first quarter. At that point, the defenses took over, holding both offenses scoreless for more than 24 minutes. Late in the second quarter, Jess Lewis and Jon Sandstrom combined to recover a fumble at the Purdue 26. The Beavers drove 17 yards to set up Mike Haggard's 26-yard field goal with 46 seconds left in the half. Oregon State went into the locker room 30 minutes away from pulling off the upset.

In the third quarter, Keyes scored his second touchdown on a seven-yard run to give the Boilermakers the lead for the first time, 14–10. After the touchdown, the Beavers’ defense stiffened, not allowing Purdue past the Oregon State 40 for the rest of the game. Late in the third quarter, the Beavers pulled within one on Haggard's 32-yard field goal. With 6:35 left, Jess Lewis came up with his second fumble at the Boilermaker 30. Six of the next seven plays, Preece handed off to Bill Enyart, who capped the drive with a four-yard run with 3:54 left. However, the two-point conversion failed, leaving Oregon State in front by five. Haggard was instructed to kick the ball away from Keyes. He lofted the ball high in the air, and Purdue was unable to field the kick, which was recovered by the Beavers' Mel Easley on the Boilermaker 28. Oregon State only managed seven yards, but Haggard converted his third field goal, a 38-yarder with 1:06 left to put the Beavers on top 22–14. Purdue's last hope evaporated when Mike Groff intercepted the Boilermakers' first pass on their next drive to seal the victory. 2000 people turned out at the Corvallis Airport to welcome the team home. The Beavers' win remained Oregon State's only visit to West Lafayette until 2021. It remains Oregon State's sole win in West Lafayette.

Upon finding out that Blackburn had worn a tuxedo to the game, Dee Andros asked Blackburn to keep wearing the tuxedo, which he did for the rest of the season.

=== Washington State ===
	1	2	3	4	Total
Cougars	0	0	7	0	7
Beavers	7	14	0	14	35

After a first quarter Washington State punt, personal fouls on back-to-back plays gave Oregon State the ball at the Cougar 12. Five Bill Enyart carries later, the Beavers were up 7–0. Washington State's best drives of the first half ended in a missed 40-yard field goal and a fumble that Skip Vanderbundt recovered at the Oregon State 31. On the ensuing drive, a 28-yard Billy Main carry gave the Beavers the ball at the Cougar nine. Enyart carried three consecutive times for his second touchdown and a 14–0 Oregon State lead with 1:38 left. The Beavers held Washington State to three-and-out and got the ball back at their own 27. After a 15-yard screen pass from Steve Preece to Main, they hooked up again for a 58-yard touchdown and a 21–0 Oregon State lead at halftime.

On the Cougars' opening drive of the second half, they pulled within two touchdowns. Two minutes later, Washington State recovered a blocked Gary Houser punt at the Beaver four. However, the Cougars got no closer on four plays to end the threat. Oregon State tacked on two fourth-quarter touchdown runs by Don Summers and reserve quarterback Bobby Mayes to take a 35–7 lead. WSU threatened one last time, but the Beavers' Larry Rich made a touchdown-saving tackle at the Oregon State three to preserve the 28-point homecoming victory.

=== UCLA ===
	1	2	3	4	Total
Beavers	7	0	6	3	16
Bruins	0	13	0	3	16

Oregon State and UCLA met for the first time since 1958, the final year of the Pacific Coast Conference. The game pitted the Beavers against their former coach, Tommy Prothro, for the first time. The game was the third between Dee Andros and Prothro. Prothro had won the first two. The Bruins began the season by beating #3 Tennessee. They followed the win by beating Pittsburgh on the road by 32. Later in the season, they returned to Pennsylvania and beat Penn State by two. The Nittany Lions wound up tenth in the AP poll; the loss to UCLA was their biggest loss of the year.

The star for UCLA was quarterback Gary Beban, who went on to win the 1967 Heisman Trophy and Maxwell Award. He and their three All-Conference linemen were the biggest reasons the Bruins were averaging 31 points an outing, averaging victories over their opponents by more than 15 points a game. There was no All-Conference selection for kicker in 1967, but UCLA's Zenon Andrusyshyn almost certainly would have been the All-Conference selection. The Bruins’ bye week was the previous week, so UCLA had two weeks to prepare for the Beavers. Oddsmakers initially made the Bruins a 13-point favorite but gamblers loaded up on upset-minded Oregon State. At kickoff, the spread was a mere seven points.

In the first quarter, the Beavers got the first break, when Oregon State's Jim Belcher came up with a fumbled punt at the UCLA 38. Two plays after Steve Preece scrambled for 35 yards, Bill Enyart bowled in from one yard out for a 7–0 lead. At the beginning of the second quarter, the Bruins stopped Enyart six inches from the end zone, but Enyart spun into the end zone. The referees ruled that Enyart's forward progress had been stopped and gave the ball to UCLA. On the ensuing drive, the Beavers' Bill Nelson jarred the ball loose from the Bruins' Rick Purdy. Oregon State's Jess Lewis recovered the fumble, but one of the officials had blown the play dead, while the ball was still in the air. The officials ultimately awarded the ball to UCLA, who drove 99 yards for a touchdown, knotting the score at seven. UCLA followed the touchdown with a 52-yard Andrusyshyn field goal. With less than two minutes left, the Bruins recovered a blocked Gary Houser punt at the Beaver 16. Oregon State's defense did not allow the Bruins a yard, but Andrushyn kicked a 33-yard field goal to give UCLA a 13–7 halftime lead.

Both teams' defenses dominated most of the third quarter, but the Beavers' Billy Main managed to scamper into the end zone from nine yards out. Mike Haggard's all-important extra point hit the left upright, which preserved a 13-all tie. In the fourth quarter, the Bruins put together a 71-yard drive aided by an inadvertent whistle, which nullified a UCLA fumble. The Bruins had to settle for a 26-yard field goal. UCLA threatened again later in the quarter, but Mark Waletich intercepted a Beban pass in the Oregon State end zone with less than two minutes left. The Beavers drove 69 yards in less than a minute but faced fourth-and-six at the Bruin 11. Andros opted to try a field goal. Haggard's 28-yard field goal split the uprights with 1:15 left. The Bruins, trying to avoid the first blemish on their record drove to the Oregon State 23. Andrushyn came on for a 40-yard field goal attempt, but Ron Boley batted down the kick with less than 10 seconds left to preserve the tie. The 16 points were the fewest that UCLA would score in 1967. Preece was voted AAWU Back of the Day. Defensive end Harry Gunner was voted AAWU Lineman of the Day. 1000 people turned out at the Corvallis Airport to welcome the team home. The game had barely ended when Dee Andros began being assailed by questions about Oregon State's chances against the #1 Trojans. He finally grew sick of it and said, "I'm tired of playing these number two ranked teams. Bring on number one."

=== USC ===
	1	2	3	4	Total
Trojans	0	0	0	0	0
Beavers	0	3	0	0	3

The #1 Trojans were a juggernaut. In the 1960s, USC would finish no worse than second in their conference, winning six conference championships, playing in five Rose Bowls and winning two national championships. The 1967 USC Trojans football team may have been the best Trojan team in the decade. The Sporting News ranked that USC team as the #9 team of the 20th century. Their non-conference schedule included #1 Notre Dame in Notre Dame; #3 Michigan State in East Lansing; and #4 Texas in the Coliseum. USC started off the non-conference slate with a 17–13 win over Texas. Then, they defeated Michigan State 21–17. In the Battle for the Jeweled Shillelagh, the Trojans defeated the Irish 24–7 at Notre Dame. The 17-point loss served as the largest margin of defeat the Irish would endure at Notre Dame between 1963 and 1976. When the Trojans rolled into Corvallis, they were averaging winning every game by more than 20 points against a very difficult schedule. The game marked the Trojans' first-ever trip to Corvallis. All previous Oregon State "home" games between the two teams had been held in Portland and Tacoma.

USC's two biggest stars were right tackle Ron Yary and halfback O. J. Simpson. Yary was the best lineman in the country and would win the Outland and Rockne Trophies at the end of the year. Simpson led the country with 1050 rushing yards. He would go on to finish second on Heisman ballots in 1967 and would win the trophy in 1968. Both players would wind up as the first overall pick of the NFL draft after their respective senior seasons, and each would enter both the College Football and Pro Football Halls of Fame. On defense, the Trojans had three First Team All-Americans: Tim Rossovich at end, Adrian Young at linebacker, and Mike Battle in the secondary. The game was highly anticipated. California governor (and future President) Ronald Reagan and Oregon governor Tom McCall made the trip. Reagan had famously said he would handpick a box of oranges if Oregon State won. Tom McCall turned the boast into a bet when he offered to put up a freshly caught silver salmon against Ronald Reagan's handpicked box of oranges. The game was held on Veterans Day, so, along with the two governors, ten generals and admirals, including Lt. General Jimmy Doolittle; three Congressional Medal of Honor recipients; and the Air Force Academy Drum and Bugle Corps were on hand. Additionally, the 1942 Oregon State Rose Bowl team was celebrating its 25th anniversary and were in attendance. All told, 41,494 fans filled the 40,750-seat stadium. It was the most-attended single sporting event in the history of Oregon to that date. The weather, which became a topic of contention after the fact, was typical for a November in Oregon. From the eighth to the eleventh only .83" of rain fell. At kickoff, the #1 Trojans were 11-point favorites over the #13 Beavers.

On the Trojans' first play from scrimmage, Simpson quickly showed he was worthy of Heisman consideration, rushing for 40 yards around left end. However, the Trojans were forced to settle for a 36-yard field goal attempt, which sailed wide right. The Trojans did not get any closer to the Beaver end zone for the rest of the game. By the end of the first quarter, Simpson had already rushed for 87 yards. Early in the second quarter, the Juice finally broke loose. He shook off a tackler at the Trojan 37 and steamed upfield with four blockers to lead him. He only had one man to beat, Mark Waletich. Simpson slowed down in an attempt to allow his blockers to make a play on Waletich. Waletich stayed in front of Simpson long enough and out of nowhere, Jess Lewis closed on Simpson, eventually dragging O.J. down from behind at the Beaver 32. USC would get eight yards on the next three plays. Rather than attempt a 41-yard field goal, the Trojans went for it, but Ron Boley tackled the Trojans' quarterback, Steve Sogge, for no gain. Later in the second quarter, Oregon State's Skip Vanderbundt came up with a USC fumble at the Trojan 47. Over the next eight plays, the Beavers rushed for 34 yards all on running plays by Bill Enyart, Steve Preece, and Billy Main. On fourth-and-three at the Trojan 14, Mike Haggard's 30 yarder split the uprights for a 3–0 lead with 5:02 left. After holding USC to a three-and-out, Oregon State's Bob Mayes ran 25-yards on a reverse. However, Haggard's second attempt from 28 yards sailed wide right, and the half ended with a 3–0 Oregon State lead.

In the third quarter, Enyart took off from the Beaver 24, and was not caught until he reached the Trojans' 19. When he was tackled, Enyart fumbled. The fumble was recovered by USC's team captain, Adrian Young. As the game wore on, both defenses only seemed to get stronger. Early in the fourth quarter, USC faced a third-and-two at its own 23. Ron Boley dropped Steve Sogge for a loss. Later in the quarter, the Trojans had their best scoring opportunity of the second half, when they faced third-and-one at Oregon State's 42. Boley again tackled Sogge in the backfield for a two-yard loss. Oregon State's returner, Charlie Olds, received the ensuing punt at the Beaver nine and raced downfield. He was hit at the Trojan 35-yard line and fumbled. The ball bounced near Olds but not near enough to recover the fumble. Instead, Olds knocked the ball out of bounds. The referees called a penalty for illegal batting, which was a personal foul, penalized by an automatic change of possession. USC was unable to generate a first down on the drive. In the last 44 minutes of the game, the Trojans managed just three first downs and only crossed midfield twice. Perhaps the best boost for the defense was the punting of Gary Houser. USC did not start a drive beyond their own 35 after a Houser punt all game long. With three minutes left, Skip Vanderbundt forced a Simpson fumble. It proved to be Simpson's final carry. He ended with 188 yards rushing but, more importantly, no touchdowns. Fittingly, Jess Lewis came up with the fumble at the Trojan 35. Oregon State's offense was so enthused that they managed their only first downs of the second half, which enabled the Beavers to run out the clock. The Beavers faced fourth-and-one at the Trojan 38 with 34 seconds left. Enyart ran for one yard and a first down. Preece took a knee to end the game.

The Los Angeles Examiner wrote of Oregon State "Giant-killers? Heck, today they're the giants." That night, Andros received congratulatory calls from Governor McCall, Senator Mark Hatfield, and Oklahoma's former head coach (and Andros' old coach), Bud Wilkinson. Oregon Journal sports editor George Pasero reported that Trojan Athletic Director Jess Hill told the Los Angeles papers that an AAWU rule would be passed to require teams to use tarpaulins in the week prior to a game. Governor Reagan issued a statement that he would help to purchase the tarp and that he would have his $1 donation in the mail shortly. Upon hearing the quotes from Hill and Reagan, Andros told the Journal that he would consider using a tarpaulin, if the Los Angeles schools purchased "a couple of big fans and blow the smog out of the Coliseum." No AAWU rule was ever passed about the use of tarpaulins.

Enyart finished with 135 yards. Simpson had 188 yards, 81 yards on two carries. The other Trojans were held to 18 yards combined. The 3–0 loss was the last time the Trojans would be shut out until they went on probation in 1983. USC would not lose another regular season game until 1970; for the rest of the 1960s decade, their only blemishes would be ties against arch-rival Notre Dame in 1968 and 1969, and a loss to national champion Ohio State in the 1969 Rose Bowl. The 1967 Oregon State team remains the only college football team to go undefeated against three top two teams in the same season. It is unclear whether Tom McCall ever received the box of oranges Ronald Reagan had promised to hand-pick. UCLA's 48–0 win over Washington the same day eliminated Oregon State from the Rose Bowl race. Conference rules did not permit more than one team to go to a bowl game at the time, so the Civil War would be Oregon State's last game of the year. On November 18, #1 UCLA and #2 USC battled for the Victory Bell in the Coliseum. UCLA was 7–0–1 and USC was 8–1. It has been dubbed the "Game of the Century" and the "signature game" in the rivalry. The 21–20 win on Simpson's 64-yard fourth quarter scamper helped propel the Trojans to a national championship. The Beavers' 1967 win over USC would be their last over the Trojans until 2000.

=== Oregon ===
	1	2	3	4	Total
Beavers	0	0	0	14	14
Ducks	3	0	7	0	10

The final opponent on #8 Oregon State's schedule was 2–7 Oregon. The Ducks were not another giant, but they were improving. Their two victories had both come in the previous four weeks. Oregon's strength was their defense behind defensive coordinator John Robinson, All-Conference nose guard George Dames, and All-Conference defensive back Jim Smith. This was the first Civil War game at Autzen Stadium, which opened two months earlier with natural grass. The attendance was 40,100, a Civil War record at the time.

Gary Houser's first punt was partially blocked and recovered by the Ducks at the Beaver 31. On their first play from scrimmage, Oregon's Eric Olson threw a 20-yard pass. The Ducks would only gain one yard on three plays and had to settle for a 27-yard field goal. Before halftime, Oregon State's Bill Enyart fumbled twice inside Oregon's 10-yard line. Charlie Olds ended the Ducks' best drive of the second quarter by picking off an Eric Olsen pass in the Beaver red zone.

Oregon State's first drive of the second half ended on a Beaver fumble at Oregon's 43. The Ducks capitalized, quickly finding themselves with first-and-goal at the Beaver three. Oregon State's defense did not fold, stopping Oregon a foot short of the end zone on third-and-goal. However, the Ducks dove in on their fourth attempt, increasing their lead to 10–0 with five minutes left in the third quarter. Oregon State was in dire straits after fumbling again at their own 45-yard line. Oregon drove 15 yards but missed a 47-yard field goal. Early in the fourth quarter, Oregon State finally hit their stride. Starting at their own 20, the running game began finding holes over and through the Duck defense. On one third-and-eight, Steve Preece found Don Summers for a 35-yard gain. On the next play, Roger Cantlon slipped and fell down but still managed to haul in a pass at Oregon's one-yard line. From there, Enyart plowed over the Duck defenders and into the end zone, cutting Oregon's lead to 10–7 with nine minutes left. Oregon State's defense responded by forcing Oregon to go three-and-out. The punt only carried to the Beavers’ 45. Nine plays later, Oregon State had the ball first-and-goal on the four-yard line. The Ducks loaded up the middle to try to stop Enyart; however, Steve Preece threw them a curve, running around left end for a touchdown with two-and-a-half minutes left to take the lead, 14–10. After getting the ball back, Oregon's final four plays only netted seven yards, turning the ball over to Oregon State. The Ducks did not get the ball back.

=== Final standing ===
The Civil War victory propelled the Beavers to No. 7 in the final AP poll, which was their best ever final ranking. It would take another 33 years for Oregon State to be ranked any higher. Oregon State's 7–2–1 record was its best between 1962 and 2000. It is all the more impressive because the Beavers were only favored to win three of the ten games they played.

== Roster ==
- QB Steve Preece, Jr.
- OG Rocky Rasley, Jr.
- Skip Vanderbrundt, Sr. (defense)
- Bobby Mayes, Jr. Offense
- C John Didion, Jr. Offense

== NFL/AFL draft ==
Three Beavers were selected in the 1968 NFL/AFL draft, the second common draft, which lasted seventeen rounds (462 selections).

Player	Position	Round	Overall	Franchise
Skip Vanderbundt	Linebacker	3	69	San Francisco 49ers
Harry Gunner	Defensive end	8	193	Cincinnati Bengals
Gary Houser	Punter/tight end	9	236	New York Jets
