= 1967 UCLA vs. USC football game =

1967 UCLA vs. USC
- Conference game National Championship Game (Note: Through luck and fortuitous scheduling, a "national championship game" was occasionally able to settle the matter on the field, as described in some contemporaneous reports. Despite the promotional billing, in several instances there were plausible scenarios for a third team to be selected as national champion by the major selectors, depending on outcomes of other games.) (Note: Game was played November 18. UCLA played and lost another regular season game November 25 and dropped out of the top ten. Tennessee was ranked AP No. 2 entering play that week, won its last two regular season games, and remained No. 2 in both final championship polls in late November.) "Game of the Century"
UCLA Bruins	USC Trojans
(7–0–1)	(8–1)
20	21
Head coach: Tommy Prothro	Head coach: John McKay
AP / Coaches; 1 / 1	AP / Coaches; 4 / 2
	1	2	3	4	Total
UCLA	7	0	7	6	20
USC	7	7	0	7	21
- Date: November 18, 1967
- Season: 1967
- Stadium: Los Angeles Memorial Coliseum
- Location: Los Angeles, California
- National anthem: USC Marching Band
- Halftime show: USC Marching Band, UCLA Marching Band
- Attendance: 90,772

United States TV coverage
- Network: ABC
- Announcers: Chris Schenkel and Bud Wilkinson

The 1967 UCLA vs. USC football game was an American college football game played during the 1967 NCAA University Division football season on November 18, 1967. The UCLA Bruins, 7–0–1 and ranked No. 1, with senior quarterback Gary Beban as a Heisman Trophy candidate, played the USC Trojans, 8–1 and ranked No. 4, with junior running back O. J. Simpson also as a Heisman candidate. This game is widely regarded as the signature game in the UCLA–USC rivalry as well as one of the 20th-century Games of the Century. The 64-yard run by Simpson for the winning touchdown is regarded as one of the greatest run plays in college football.

== Introduction ==
=== 1965–66 ===
In 1965, sixth-ranked USC (led by Mike Garrett) met seventh-ranked UCLA (led by All-Conference sophomore quarterback Gary Beban), with a berth in the 1966 Rose Bowl on the line. The scoring opened with All-American Tailback Mel Farr running 49 yards for a Bruin touchdown. The extra point was blocked, Despite dominating in the statistics, USC led only 16–6 with less than four minutes left in the game (In the first 3 1/2 quarters, USC penetrated inside the UCLA 25-yard line seven times; three times they fumbled, threw one interception in the end zone, settled for a short field goal, and scored two touchdowns, missing the extra point on one). On 3rd and 23, UCLA linebacker Dallas Grider hit USC quarterback Troy Winslow and caused a fumble. UCLA scored on a Beban touchdown pass to Dick Witcher and successfully converted a two-point conversion to make the score 16–14 (A tie would have sent USC to the Rose Bowl, hence the reason UCLA went for two). Then Grider then recovered an onside kick, and two plays later, Beban hit Kurt Altenberg, a decoy for Mel Farr, on a 49-yard touchdown bomb to win the game, 20–16. In the final polls, UCLA was ranked 4th in the AP and 5th in the UPI. UCLA upset #1-ranked Michigan State in the 1966 Rose Bowl, 14–12. USC finished ranked #9 in the AP poll. Garrett would win the Heisman Trophy, but not get to play in the Rose Bowl.

In 1966, due to uneven scheduling that left out new AAWU members Oregon and Oregon State, UCLA was 3–1 in conference games and 8-1 overall. The Bruins lost only one game, at Washington 16–3. USC was 5–0, but lost out of conference to Miami (Florida). It was widely assumed that the winner of the 1966 game between 8th ranked UCLA and 7th ranked USC would go to the 1967 Rose Bowl. UCLA star QB Gary Beban was out with a broken ankle, but backup Norman Dow, making his first and only start at QB, led UCLA to a 14–7 win. A vote the next Monday among the AAWU conference athletic directors put USC in the Rose Bowl. It was speculated that this was to make up for 1964 when Oregon State (8-2 overall, 4-1 in conference) was voted in ahead of USC (7-3 overall, 4-1 in conference) despite USC's 20-17 upset of #1 Notre Dame in the season's final game; the Oregon State coach at the time was Tommy Prothro, who became UCLA's coach in 1965. In addition, the directors believed Beban could not play for UCLA in the Rose Bowl due to the broken ankle, thereby giving the Big 10 representative (Purdue) a better chance to win. UCLA students protested by blocking the Northbound lanes of I-405 at Wilshire Boulevard. A week after the athletic directors' vote, USC failed to validate that decision as they lost to Notre Dame 51–0. At the time, that was the worst defeat in USC Trojan football history. USC entered the Rose Bowl unranked and lost to Purdue, 14–13. Ironically, Beban's ankle had healed and he could have played. UCLA finished fifth in both polls.

=== 1967 season ===
USC and UCLA began the season ranked seventh and eighth respectively. USC had been ranked #1 for six weeks since beating #5 Texas and later Michigan State. USC notched a 24–7 victory over #5 Notre Dame on October 14, 1967. UCLA opened its season with a last minute 20-16 win over #7 Tennessee (the Vols only loss that regular season), and reached #2 before tying Oregon State 16–16 on November 4. A week later in a downpour in Corvallis, Oregon, Oregon State would beat top-ranked USC 3–0, as O.J. Simpson could not get going on the muddy field. USC dropped to #2 in the UPI and #4 in the AP, while UCLA ascended to the top ranking after their 48–0 win over Washington. It was the first time since the 1955 season that UCLA was ranked #1, and only the fourth AP weekly poll in the history of the school. UCLA's tie and USC's loss were both inflicted by the Oregon State Beavers and their famed "Giant Killers" team. This same Oregon State team had defeated #2 ranked Purdue. But a 13–6 loss to Washington earlier in the season ultimately cost the Beavers the conference title and Rose Bowl berth.

=== What was at stake ===
This game was for the championship of the AAWU (then informally known as the Pac-8 and now the Pac-12), a berth in the Rose Bowl game, and for the likelihood that the winner of the game would be the AP Poll national champion, as the final 1967 wire service polls were to be published at the end of the regular season two weeks later. This was despite that No. 1 UCLA and AP No. 2 Tennessee each played games this week and the following final week of the season. Life Magazine declared it "the college football season's most decisive game." The next year, the final poll would be published after the bowl games.

Aside from conference standings, the top Heisman vote getter from the previous season, Beban, would meet Simpson, one of the most explosive running backs of that season. And as with all USC-UCLA games, the "championship" of Los Angeles and bragging rights within the city were also at stake. USC was the established football power with seven national championships, the most recent in 1962. UCLA was regarded as an upstart, but had one national championship in 1954.

=== "Home" game ===
Both teams played their home games at the Los Angeles Memorial Coliseum until 1982, when UCLA first went outside the city of Los Angeles to play at the Rose Bowl in Pasadena. The 1967 game would be a USC "home" game, which meant that USC fans sat on the North side of the Coliseum, while the UCLA fans sat on the South (press box) side of the Coliseum. Both teams also wore their home uniforms when meeting at the Coliseum, UCLA in Powderkeg blue and USC in Cardinal.

=== National television coverage ===
The American Broadcasting Company began showing college football on television in color the previous season. By the NCAA rules, only 8 national and 5 regional telecasts were allowed during the season. This game would be the ABC-TV game of the week and would be presented live in color and feature the ABC sports "Slo Mo replay". ABC's No. 1 broadcast team of Chris Schenkel and Bud Wilkinson called the action.

== Scoring ==
UCLA opened the scoring when running back Greg Jones scored on a 12-yard run. Sophomore Zenon Andrusyshyn kicked the extra point to make it 7–0. After a USC punt, Beban had the Bruins on the move again at the USC 41-yard line. The next play, Beban took a one step drop, rolled to the right, and faked a sideline pass to the right, then wheeled around and blindly threw a pass in the left flat intended for running back Greg Jones. However, USC linebacker Pat Cashman was not fooled by the fake to the right and jumped in front of Jones to take an interception return 55 yards for a USC touchdown. Rikki Aldridge kicked the extra point to tie the game. While O.J. Simpson's 64-yard run became famous, this play by Cashman turned the game around.

In the second quarter, after a UCLA missed field goal, Earl McCullouch would run 52 yards on a flanker reverse; he fumbled near the end of the play but USC recovered. He then caught another 13-yard pass. This set up O. J. Simpson for a weaving 12-yard touchdown run through most of the UCLA defensive unit in which he dragged two tacklers to the end zone. USC led at halftime 14-7.

In the third quarter Gary Beban hit George Farmer for a touchdown pass for 53 yards to tie the score. UCLA continued to dominate in the second half, despite the fact Beban had to be helped off the field numerous times after getting hit on his injured ribs (Beban had a bad bruise and a piece of detached cartilage). Twice he drove the Bruins into field goal range. However, USC head coach John McKay had noticed that UCLA kicker Andrusyshyn kicked with a low trajectory, so he put 6'8" Bill Hayhoe in the middle of the line on the Trojans field goal defense unit; Hayhoe blocked two field goals to keep the game tied.

With the game tied 14–14 early in the fourth quarter, an injured Beban gamely threw a touchdown pass to Dave Nuttall. The extra point attempt by Andrusyshyn was tipped by Hayhoe and went wide, resulting in a 20–14 UCLA lead.

=== The big play ===
With 10:38 left in the game, USC faced a 3rd and 7 from its own 36-yard line. Trojan quarterback Toby Page, who had replaced an ineffective Steve Sogge, called a pass play, then saw the Bruin linebackers drop back into pass coverage. He changed the signals before the snap, calling an audible ("23 blast"), and handed off to Simpson. Simpson would later recall standing in his halfback position, hearing the audible and thinking to himself "Toby, it's 3rd and 7; this is a terrible call." Simpson veered to the left sideline, got a key block from fullback Dan Scott, and then cut back to the middle to run 64 yards for a touchdown. Rikki Aldridge kicked the extra point, and the Trojans led, 21–20. John McKay stated, "I believe it was the most exciting college run I've ever seen." By now Beban could barely move or breathe, and UCLA never crossed midfield again as USC won.

Other key players were Ron Yary, Tim Rossovich, and Adrian Young for the Trojans.

== Aftermath ==
Playing with badly bruised ribs and the cartilage injury, Beban passed for 301 yards. Simpson had a phenomenal run and finished with two touchdowns, 177 yards and 30 carries. Commenting on Beban's heroic effort playing through injury, Los Angeles Times columnist Jim Murray wrote, among other things, that he was "glad he didn't go to the opera after all", and if "Gary Beban wins the Heisman Trophy, they ought to fill it with aspirin."

Keith Jackson, who was in his second year of ABC football broadcasting, narrating the taped highlights of the game, declared it many years later to be the greatest game he has ever seen. So did Giles Pellerin, a USC graduate who attended every game USC played from 1926 until his death at the 1998 USC-UCLA game at the Rose Bowl (797 straight games over 72 years).

Both Beban and Simpson were featured on the cover of the November 20 issue of Sports Illustrated magazine. That issue went to press before the game. The November 27 issue of Sports Illustrated called it "The game of the year." In that article, Jim Murray was quoted as saying, "They should send the Heisman out here with two straws."

=== UCLA vs. Syracuse ===
With Beban out due to the rib injury, a disheartened UCLA would lose the next week at Larry Csonka-led Syracuse 32–14. UCLA would not be invited to any bowl games due to the exclusive Big Ten/AAWU Rose Bowl agreement – only the conference champions could go to a bowl game until 1975. UCLA finished second in the AAWU tied with Oregon State at 4–1–1, ranked 10th in the Coaches' poll.

=== Heisman trophy ===
Despite the losses, Beban would win the Heisman Trophy. Simpson would win the Heisman trophy the next season. The most common reason given is that Simpson was a junior, and would have a chance the next year. At the time, the Heisman trophy was rarely given to an underclassman.

UCLA became the first school to have a top winner in both basketball and football in the same year with Beban winning the Heisman Trophy and Lew Alcindor (now Kareem Abdul-Jabbar) winning the U.S. Basketball Writers Association player of the year award in 1968.

=== Rose Bowl ===
USC would go on to the 1968 Rose Bowl ranked #1 and defeat the #4 ranked Big Ten champion Indiana, 14–3.

=== National championship ===
USC would finish ranked #1 and win the national championship for 1967. This was the last year the Associated Press conducted its final poll prior to bowl games. The coaches' poll, then administered by United Press International, did not follow suit until 1974, when, ironically, USC was voted #1 (Oklahoma was voted #1 by the AP, but was ineligible to be ranked by UPI due to NCAA probation).

=== Simpson and Beban in the NFL ===
Simpson would go on to have one of the greatest professional careers any running back has ever had, rushing for over 11,000 yards, mostly for the Buffalo Bills, at a time when an NFL season was still 14 games. Simpson played nine seasons with the Bills and his final two with the San Francisco 49ers. During his final 2 seasons with the 49ers, the NFL season expanded to 16 games. He was inducted into the Pro Football Hall of Fame in 1985.

Beban was a bust as a pro. He was drafted by the Los Angeles Rams, who already had an established starting quarterback, Roman Gabriel. Beban was then traded to the Washington Redskins, who already had a future Hall of Fame quarterback in Sonny Jurgensen. The Redskins, coached in 1968 by former Hall of Fame quarterback Otto Graham, moved Beban to wide receiver. Beban lasted only two seasons with the Redskins, playing in 1969 for Vince Lombardi. After failing to catch on with any team in 1970, Beban retired in August 1971.

=== Arnold Friberg paintings ===
Artist Arnold Friberg was commissioned by Chevrolet to paint a series commemorating the 100th anniversary of American intercollegiate football in 1969. He created four paintings, each representing major turning points in the intercollegiate game. Painting #4 was titled O.J. Simpson Breaks for Daylight and captures a moment in this famous Game of the Century. These paintings were used during the 1969 Chevrolet advertising campaign and were among the most demanding and exciting pieces Friberg had done. These paintings were such a success that they were taken on tour and shown at universities throughout the country.

== Legacy ==
The 1967 USC Trojan football team has been named one of the best teams of the 20th century by the Sporting News and college football historian Richard Whittingham.

No. 1 ranked USC would be heavily favored over a rebuilding 3–6 UCLA team again in 1968. UCLA took an early lead and trailed only 21–16 midway through the 4th quarter and, led by sophomore quarterback Jim Nader, would drive inside the USC 5-yard line. But UCLA was repelled on downs and USC, led by Simpson who would win the Heisman Trophy, scored a clinching touchdown to win 28–16. One week later USC would drop to #2 in the polls after being tied by Notre Dame, 21–21. The Trojans then lost to Ohio State 27–16 in a 1 vs. 2 matchup in the Rose Bowl. In 1969 both teams would be undefeated with the Rose Bowl on the line again. USC would prevail 14–12. The loss in 1969 reportedly affected UCLA coach Tommy Prothro more than the 1967 loss. USC would get a 10–2–1 record against UCLA through the 1970s, and would win all six matchups in that period where the Rose Bowl was on the line for both teams. The Trojans would win three more National championships in 1972, 1974, and 1978. The 1972 Trojan team also was named one of the best teams of the 20th century. The Trojans would regain the top position again in college football in the 21st century.

Since that meeting UCLA would come close to a national championship in 1976, 1980, 1988 with a two-week #1 ranking, and 1998, with a season-ending loss in Miami keeping them out of the first BCS championship. They did beat top ranked Ohio State in the 1976 Rose Bowl, and later won 3 Rose Bowls in 4 years in the mid-1980s.

In a 1995 vote of the greatest moments in Los Angeles sports history, O.J. Simpson's touchdown run ranked #5. The 1965 UCLA defeat of USC in the UCLA–USC rivalry game to get to the Rose Bowl ranked #35. Bob Stiles stop of Bob Apisa on the goal line to defeat Michigan State in the 1966 Rose Bowl ranked #26.

== See also ==
- List of historically significant college football games

== Books ==
- Peters, Nick. (1988) College Football's Twenty-Five Greatest Teams: The Sporting News. No. 9 Southern California Trojans 1967 ISBN 0-89204-281-8
- White, Lonnie. (August 2004). UCLA vs. USC: 75 Years of the Greatest Rivalry in Sports: Los Angeles Times Books. ISBN 1-883792-27-4
- Whittingham, Richard. (December 1985). Saturday Afternoon: College Football and the Men Who Made the Day: Workman Pub Co. ISBN 0-89480-933-4 (Whittingham names the 1967 USC Trojans football team as the team of the decade for the 1960s)

== Articles ==
- Florence, Mal – The Great Rivalries USC vs. UCLA. Athlon College Football Preview, Autumn 1990
