= Steve Preece =

American football player (born 1947)

No. 33, 23, 20
- Position: Defensive back

Personal information
- Born: February 15, 1947 (age 79); Idaho Falls, Idaho, U.S.
- Listed height: 6 ft 1 in (1.85 m)
- Listed weight: 195 lb (88 kg)

Career information
- High school: Borah (Boise, Idaho)
- College: Oregon State (1965-1968)
- NFL draft: 1969: undrafted

Career history
- New Orleans Saints (1969); Philadelphia Eagles (1970–1972); Denver Broncos (1972); Los Angeles Rams (1973–1976); Seattle Seahawks (1977)

Awards and highlights
- 2× Second-team All-Pac-8 (1967, 1968)

Career NFL statistics
- Interceptions: 14
- Fumble recoveries: 13
- Touchdowns: 3
- Stats at Pro Football Reference

Steven Packer Preece (born February 15, 1947) is an American former professional football player who was a defensive back for nine seasons in the National Football League (NFL) from 1969 to 1977. He played college football as an option quarterback for the Oregon State Beavers.

== Early life ==
Born in Idaho Falls, Preece grew up in Boise and played high school football at Borah for coach Ed Troxel, also his coach in track. At the talent-rich program, Preece had to wait his turn to play. Opened in 1958, Borah had won or tied for the conference title and mythical state title (writers' poll) in each of its first six years.

Preece became the Lions' starting quarterback during his senior year in the fall of 1964. The Borah Lions were undefeated entering the final game against rival Boise on Veterans Day, but allowed the Braves to overcome a ten-point deficit in the second half to gain their first win in seven tries over Borah, and the Lions had to settle for second place for the first time in the conference and final state poll.

In March 1965, Preece helped lead the Lions to their first state title in basketball, winning the A-1 (largest schools) state tournament in Pocatello, defeating Twin Falls in the final to finish the season with a 24–1 record.

== College career ==
After graduating in 1965, Preece accepted a scholarship to Oregon State, recruited by linebackers coach Ed Knecht. Knecht had previously been the head coach at rival Boise High, and had connections in southwestern Idaho. Preece had great speed (10.0 in the 100 yard dash), and a good arm, a great fit for the option offense. Knecht had received a phone call warning him that a rival school was attempting to steal Preece away from the Beavers, so he promptly called new head coach Dee Andros with the news, to which Andros responded, "Get the $@%! over there. And if you don't get him, don't bother to come back." (Andros was previously the head coach at the University of Idaho. Knecht was a former assistant coach at Idaho and a future athletic director (1969–74).

As a sophomore in 1966, Preece split time as the starting quarterback with senior Paul Brothers. After Brothers' graduation, Preece was the starter for the 1967 and 1968 seasons, and the Beavers compiled a 14–5–1 (.725) record. Included in this success was a win and a tie against UCLA, and a split with USC and O. J. Simpson. The Beavers won 3–0 in 1967, the Trojans won 17–13 in 1968 in Los Angeles.

The 1967 OSU football team finished with a record of 7–2–1 and a #7 ranking in the AP national poll. OSU defeated previous #1 USC in Corvallis, and #2 Purdue on the road, and tied #2 UCLA in Los Angeles, earning them the title of "The Giant Killers." OSU also beat the Iowa Hawkeyes on the road, but a mid-season lapse of consecutive losses to unranked teams severely damaged the Beavers' Rose Bowl chances and national ranking. OSU lost to the Washington Huskies in Seattle, and BYU Cougars in Corvallis. Although OSU defeated USC, the Beavers wound up behind in the Pac-8 conference standings with a loss and a tie. Conference champion USC defeated Indiana 14–3 in the Rose Bowl and was crowned national champion for the 1967 season. Oregon State did not play in a bowl game, due to conference rules; the Pac-8 (and Big Ten) did not allow a second bowl team until the 1975 season. They were seventh in the final AP Poll, released in December.

Oregon State went 7–3 in 1968 and finished #15 in the nation in the final AP Poll, released in January.

== Professional career ==
Undrafted, Preece signed a free agent NFL contract with the New Orleans Saints in 1969, not as a quarterback but as a defensive back. He was traded to the Philadelphia Eagles for the 1970 season, staying through 1971. He played one game for them in 1972, was waived, and was quickly picked up by the Denver Broncos. In 1973, Preece was acquired the Los Angeles Rams, where he played for four seasons, the last two as a back-up, the only time in his career. He played his last season in 1977 as a starter for the Seattle Seahawks, and had four interceptions. Following off-season surgery on his left knee, Preece announced his retirement in July 1978. As a professional, Preece played a role similar to Nolan Cromwell, a defensive back who held for place kicks and was available to play quarterback in an emergency; both had been option quarterbacks in college.

== After football ==
Preece is in the real estate business in Portland and regularly provides color commentary for the Oregon State football broadcasts.
