= Dee Andros =

American football player, coach, and administrator (1924–2003)

- Andros, c. 1970

Biographical details
- Born: October 17, 1924; Oklahoma City, Oklahoma, U.S.
- Died: October 22, 2003 (aged 79); Corvallis, Oregon, U.S.

Playing career
- 1946–1949: Oklahoma
- Position: Guard

Coaching career (HC unless noted)
- 1951–1952: Oklahoma (assistant)
- 1953: Kansas (assistant)
- 1954–1955: Texas Tech (assistant)
- 1956: Nebraska (assistant)
- 1957–1959: California (assistant)
- 1960–1961: Illinois (assistant)
- 1962–1964: Idaho
- 1965–1975: Oregon State

Administrative career (AD unless noted)
- 1976–1985: Oregon State

Head coaching record
- Overall: 62–80–2

Accomplishments and honors

Awards
- Second-team All-Big Seven (1949)
- Military career
- Allegiance: United States
- Branch: U.S. Marine Corps
- Service years: 1942–1946
- Rank: Sergeant
- Conflicts: World War II; Pacific theater Battle of Iwo Jima
- Awards: Bronze Star

Demosthenes Konstandies Andrecopoulos (October 17, 1924 – October 22, 2003) was an American college football player, coach, and athletics administrator. He was the head coach at the University of Idaho from 1962 to 1964 and Oregon State University from 1965 to 1975, compiling a career record of 62–80–2 (.438). A native of Oklahoma and a World War II veteran, Andros played college football as a guard at the University of Oklahoma. After retiring from coaching, he was the athletic director at Oregon State from 1976 to 1985.

== Early life, military service, and playing career ==
Born Demosthenes Konstandies Andrikopoulos in Oklahoma City, Andros was the second of three sons of a Greek immigrant father. He graduated from Oklahoma City's Central High School in 1942, and then enlisted in the military at age seventeen during World War II. Andros served four years in the U.S. Marine Corps; a cook, he picked up a rifle and was awarded the Bronze Star and spent more than a month under heavy fire on the island of Iwo Jima in 1945. He was present at the famed moment when six Marines raised the American flag on Mount Suribachi.

Andros played college football at Oklahoma from 1946 to 1949, under hall of fame head coach Bud Wilkinson. He was selected in the 14th round (177th overall) by the Chicago Cardinals in the 1950 NFL draft. Dee's older brother Plato (1922–2008) was an All-American in 1946 at Oklahoma and played four years in the NFL for the Cardinals. His younger brother Gus (Dick) (1926–2009) was a ballet dancer and choreographer.

== Coaching career ==
Andros' coaching career included stops as an assistant at Oklahoma, Kansas, Texas Tech, Nebraska, California, and Illinois. His bowl games as an assistant were the Sun Bowl in January 1956 with Texas Tech and the Rose Bowl in January 1959 with California.

=== Idaho ===
Andros became a head coach at age 37 at Idaho in February 1962. He took over in Moscow for Skip Stahley, who stepped down after eight seasons and remained as athletic director. Andros' starting annual salary was just under $12,500.

The 1962 team was 2–6–1, but the following year he led Idaho to its first winning season (5–4) in a quarter century. The tenth and final game in 1963 at Arizona State on November 23 was canceled, following the assassination of President Kennedy.

The Vandals won their opener in 1964, but then lost four straight, the latter two were close ones to Oregon and Oregon State. The 10–7 loss to the Rose Bowl-bound Beavers in Corvallis came by a late third quarter OSU punt return. The Vandals rebounded and the next week won the Battle of the Palouse for the first time in a decade, defeating neighbor Washington State 28–13. The Cougars were led by first-year head coach Bert Clark, a former Sooner teammate; the Vandals split the final four games to finish at 4–6.

While Idaho had been a driving force in the founding of the Big Sky Conference in 1963, it was primarily to alleviate basketball scheduling and the Vandals remained an independent for football through 1964 under Andros. Only one conference foe was played during the first two Big Sky seasons, a 1963 game with Idaho State that was previously scheduled. Idaho was in the University Division, while the other Big Sky members were in the College Division (which became Division II in 1973) for football. After Andros left, Idaho began conference play in 1965 under head coach Steve Musseau, Andros' defensive coordinator.

Andros spent three years on the Palouse at Idaho, with an overall record of 11–16–1 (.411).

One of his first-year hires at Idaho in 1962 was alumnus Bud Riley (1925–2012), then the head coach and athletic director at Lewiston High School, thirty miles (50 km) south of Moscow. A former Vandal halfback for Dixie Howell, he coached the Idaho freshman team for Andros and went with him to OSU in 1965. Riley was a defensive assistant in Corvallis for eight years before moving on to the Canadian Football League in 1973 and became a head coach the following year. His eldest son Mike (b.1953) was the head coach at Oregon State for fourteen seasons and later at Nebraska.

=== Oregon State ===
Andros was hired as the head coach at Oregon State in February 1965. He replaced the legendary Tommy Prothro, who left after ten seasons in Corvallis for UCLA, just ten days after leading the Beavers in the Rose Bowl. Andros compiled a 51–64–1 (.444) record in eleven seasons at OSU. In the Civil War games against the Oregon Ducks, he won his first seven and split the last four, for an overall record of 9–2 (.818). Andros was nicknamed "The Great Pumpkin" for his bright orange jacket and large physical size, first dubbed by a Spokane sports columnist during the 41–13 homecoming rout of WSU in Pullman on Halloween weekend in 1966. It was his first game on the Palouse since he left Idaho; his last Palouse game as Vandal head two years earlier was also a win over the Cougars, 28–13.

As OSU head coach, Andros was 8–3 against Washington State and split the first ten games with Washington while headed by former Oklahoma teammate Jim Owens; Oregon State was beaten 35–7 by the Huskies in Seattle in 1975, Don James' first season at UW and Andros' last in coaching. He was also 2–0 against his former team, beating the Idaho Vandals by two in Boise in 1965 and by seven in Corvallis in 1966.

==== 1967 ====
Andros is best known for his incredible 1967 season in which his team, dubbed the "Giant Killers", went 7–2–1. Led by junior quarterback Steve Preece, the Beavers beat No. 2 Purdue, tied the new No. 2 UCLA, and then beat No.1 USC. But because Oregon State lost to Washington and tied UCLA, USC won the conference title by a half game and earned the berth to the Rose Bowl, where they defeated the Big Ten's Indiana Hoosiers 14–3 and won the national title. Oregon State finished with a No. 7 ranking in the final AP Poll. In 1968, the Beavers were ranked sixth in the pre-season and finished fifteenth after a 7–3 campaign. There was no bowl game for the Beavers in either year, as both the Pac-8 and Big Ten forbade their teams from postseason participation outside of the Rose Bowl until the 1975 season.

Andros expressed an interest in the open position at Oklahoma State University in Stillwater in December 1968, and several weeks later, rejected an offer from the University of Pittsburgh, but improved his situation in Corvallis.

Although it wasn't apparent at the time, Andros' tenure at Oregon State crested with the 1968 season. Following two six-win seasons in 1969 and 1970, his teams would only win a total of 13 games in the next five years, the start of 28 straight losing seasons.

== Later life and family ==
Following an eighth straight loss to open the 1975 season, Andros announced his resignation, effective at the end of the season. Days after the final game, he was named athletic director to succeed the retiring Jim Barratt. Andros retired as AD in the spring of 1985, and continued to serve as a special assistant within the Beaver Athletic Scholarship Fund until health problems forced him to remain at his Corvallis home. He spent nearly four decades with Oregon State athletics.

Though he spent only three years at Idaho, he was still held in high regard in Moscow. In 1989, Andros was invited by new head coach John L. Smith to lead one of the sides in the annual Silver & Gold spring game, opposite former 1970s head coach Ed Troxel.

In 1992, his "Giant Killers" team of 1967 was inducted into the Oregon Sports Hall of Fame. In the spring of 2003, Andros was awarded the Martin Chaves Lifetime Achievement Award at the Fifth Annual Bennys celebration at Oregon State. Andros married Luella Andros, and they had one daughter named Jeanna. He died in Corvallis on October 22, 2003, at the age of 79.

== Head coaching record ==
| Year | Team | Overall | Conference | Standing | Coaches^{#} | AP^{°} |
|---|---|---|---|---|---|---|
Idaho Vandals (NCAA University Division independent) (1962)
| 1962 | Idaho | 2–6–1 | | | | |
Idaho Vandals (Big Sky Conference) (1963–1964)
| 1963 | Idaho | 5–4 | 1–0 | NA | | |
| 1964 | Idaho | 4–6 | 0–0 | NA | | |
| Idaho: | | 11–16–1 | 1–0 | | | |
Oregon State Beavers (Pacific-8 Conference) (1965–1975)
| 1965 | Oregon State | 5–5 | 1–3 | 7th | | |
| 1966 | Oregon State | 7–3 | 3–1 | T–2nd | 19 | |
| 1967 | Oregon State | 7–2–1 | 4–1–1 | T–2nd | 8 | 7 |
| 1968 | Oregon State | 7–3 | 5–1 | 2nd | 13 | 15 |
| 1969 | Oregon State | 6–4 | 4–3 | 4th | | |
| 1970 | Oregon State | 6–5 | 3–4 | T–6th | | |
| 1971 | Oregon State | 5–6 | 3–3 | 5th | | |
| 1972 | Oregon State | 2–9 | 1–6 | 8th | | |
| 1973 | Oregon State | 2–9 | 2–5 | T–6th | | |
| 1974 | Oregon State | 3–8 | 3–4 | T–5th | | |
| 1975 | Oregon State | 1–10 | 1–6 | 7th | | |
| Oregon State: | | 51–64–1 | 30–37–1 | | | |
| Total: | | 62–80–2 | | | | |
^{#}Rankings from final Coaches Poll.; ^{°}Rankings from final AP Poll.
