= 1970 Philadelphia Eagles season =

NFL team season

- Owner: Leonard Tose
- Head coach: Jerry Williams
- Home stadium: Franklin Field

Results
- Record: 3–10–1
- Division place: 5th NFC East
- Playoffs: Did not qualify
- Pro Bowlers: None

The 1970 Philadelphia Eagles season was their 38th in the league. They failed to improve on their previous output of 4–9–1, winning only three games. The team failed to qualify for the playoffs for the tenth consecutive season.

The Eagles did have victories over the playoff-bound Dolphins and the cross-state rival Steelers (in Franklin Field's swan song as an NFL venue). Another highlight was a 23–20 victory on Monday Night Football over the Giants, ending New York's six-game winning streak and helping deny Big Blue a playoff berth.

== Offseason ==
=== Draft ===
1970 Philadelphia Eagles draft
Round	Pick	Player	Position	College	Notes
1	6	Steve Zabel	TE	Oklahoma	
2	34	Ray Jones	CB	Southern	
3	59	Lee Bouggess	RB	Louisville	
7	158	Terry Brennan Jr.	OT	Notre Dame	Pick from CHI
8	190	Ira Gordon	OT	Kansas State	
9	215	David King	LB	Stephen F. Austin	
10	240	Steve Jaggard	DB	Memphis State	
11	268	Bill Walik	DB	Villanova	
12	293	Robert Jones	DT	Grambling	
13	318	Richard Stevens	OT	Baylor	
14	346	Mark Moseley *	K	Stephen F. Austin	
15	371	John Carlos	WR	San Jose State	
16	396	Tuufuli Uperesa	OT	Montana	
17	424	Mike Sizelove	TE	Idaho	
Made roster † Pro Football Hall of Fame * Made at least one Pro Bowl during career

== Personnel ==
=== Staff / Coaches ===
1970 Philadelphia Eagles staff
Front office: Owner – Leonard Tose; General manager – Pete Retzlaff; Head coaches: Head coach - Jerry Williams; Offensive coaches: Wide Receivers - Charlie Gauer; Running Backs – Jack Zilly; Offensive Line – Dick Stanfel	Defensive coaches: Defensive Coordinator – Joe Moss; Defensive Line - Joe Moss; Defensive Backs / Secondary – Irv Cross; Linebackers - Jim Carr; Special teams coaches: Special Teams Assistant – Jack Zilly

=== Roster ===
1970 Philadelphia Eagles roster
Quarterbacks (QB): 11 Rick Arrington; 16 Norm Snead; Running backs (RB): 46 Lee Bouggess; 20 Leroy Keyes; 22 Cyril Pinder; 34 Larry Watkins; Wide receivers (WR): 18 Ben Hawkins; 29 Harold Jackson; 9 Billy Walik; Tight ends (TE): 85 Gary Ballman; 86 Fred Hill; 89 Steve Zabel	Offensive linemen (OL): 76 Joe Carollo T; 64 Norman Davis G; 59 Mike Evans C; 71 Dick Hart G; 54 Calvin Hunt C; 72 Wade Key T; 68 Mark Nordquist C/G; 70 Jim Skaggs G; 73 Dick Stevens T; Defensive linemen (DL): 80 Don Brumm DE; 77 Ernie Calloway DE/DT; 62 Mike Dirks DT; 83 Don Hultz DT; 88 Gary Pettigrew DT; 99 Mel Tom DE	Linebackers (LB): 56 Bill Hobbs OLB; 51 Ike Kelley MLB; 52 Dave Lloyd MLB; 50 Ron Porter OLB; 82 Tim Rossovich MLB/DE; 35 Adrian Young OLB; Defensive backs (DB): 28 Bill Bradley FS; 21 Ray Jones CB; 45 Ron Medved FS; 26 Al Nelson CB; 33 Steve Preece SS/FS; 49 Jim Thrower CB; Special teams (ST): 3 Mark Moseley K/P	Practice squad: 69 Carl Gersbach LB; 48 Jay Johnson LB; -- Bob Parker LB; 24 Nate Ramsey S; -- Tuufuli Uperesa T; 41 Harry Wilson RB; Reserve: -- John Carlos WR (IR); 78 Dave Graham T (IR); 41 Richard Harvey CB (IR); 47 Ed Hayes S (IR); 23 Harry Jones RB (IR); 74 Denis Moore DT (IR); 37 Tom Woodeshick RB (IR); Rookies in italics

== Regular season ==
=== Schedule ===
Week	Date	Opponent	Result	Record	Venue	Attendance
1	September 20	**Dallas Cowboys**	**L** 7–17	0–1	Franklin Field	59,728
2	September 27	at Chicago Bears	**L** 16–20	0–2	Dyche Stadium	53,463
3	October 4	**Washington Redskins**	**L** 21–33	0–3	Franklin Field	60,658
4	October 11	at **New York Giants**	**L** 23–30	0–4	Yankee Stadium	62,820
5	October 18	**St. Louis Cardinals**	**L** 20–35	0–5	Franklin Field	59,002
6	October 25	at Green Bay Packers	**L** 17–30	0–6	Milwaukee County Stadium	48,022
7	November 1	at **Dallas Cowboys**	**L** 17–21	0–7	Cotton Bowl	55,736
8	November 8	Miami Dolphins	**W** 24–17	1–7	Franklin Field	58,171
9	November 15	Atlanta Falcons	**T** 13–13	1–7–1	Franklin Field	55,425
10	November 23	**New York Giants**	**W** 23–20	2–7–1	Franklin Field	59,117
11	November 29	at **St. Louis Cardinals**	**L** 14–23	2–8–1	Busch Memorial Stadium	46,581
12	December 6	at Baltimore Colts	**L** 10–29	2–9–1	Memorial Stadium	60,240
13	December 13	at **Washington Redskins**	**L** 6–24	2–10–1	RFK Stadium	50,415
14	December 20	Pittsburgh Steelers	**W** 30–20	3–10–1	Franklin Field	55,252
Note: Intra-division opponents are in **bold** text.

== Game recaps ==
=== Week 1 vs Cowboys ===
Week One: Dallas Cowboys (0–0) at Philadelphia Eagles (0–0)

Quarter	1	2	3	4	Total
Cowboys	0	7	7	3	17
Eagles	7	0	0	0	7

at Franklin Field, Philadelphia, Pennsylvania

- Date: September 20, 1970
- Game time: 1:00 p.m. EDT
- Game weather: 67 °F (19 °C)
- Game attendance: 59,728
- Referee: John McDonough
- Box Score

Team	Category	Player	Statistics
Cowboys	Passing	Roger Staubach	11/15, 115 yards, TD, INT
Cowboys	Rushing	Calvin Hill	25 rushes, 117 yards
Cowboys	Receiving	Lance Rentzel	6 receptions, 100 yards, TD
Eagles	Passing	Norm Snead	10/23, 138 yards, TD, 3 INT
Eagles	Rushing	Tom Woodeshick	15 rushes, 55 yards
Eagles	Receiving	Ben Hawkins	4 receptions, 57 yards, TD

Scoring summary

Quarter	Time	Drive			Team	Scoring information	Score	
Quarter	Time	Plays	Yards	TOP	Team	Scoring information	DAL	PHI
1					Eagles	Ben Hawkins 10-yard touchdown reception from Norm Snead, Mark Moseley kick good	0	7
2					Cowboys	Walt Garrison 1-yard touchdown run, Mike Clark kick good	7	7
3					Cowboys	Lance Rentzel 31-yard touchdown reception from Roger Staubach, Mike Clark kick good	14	7
4					Cowboys	13-yard field goal by Mike Clark	17	7
"TOP" = time of possession. For other American football terms, see Glossary of American football.							17	7

=== Week 2 ===
Team	1	2	3	4	Total
Eagles	6	3	0	7	16
• Bears	7	10	0	3	20

- Date: September 27
- Location: Dyche Stadium • Evanston, Illinois
- Game start: 12:00 CST
- Referee: Fred Swearingen

Scoring summary
1	CHI	Cecil Turner 96-yard kickoff return (Mac Percival kick)	Bears 7–0
1	PHI	Gary Ballman 7-yard pass from Norm Snead (kick failed)	Bears 7–6
2	CHI	Mac Percival 17-yard field goal	Bears 10–6
2	PHI	Mark Moseley 42-yard field goal	Bears 10–9
2	CHI	Dick Gordon 12-yard pass from Ronnie Bull (Mac Percival kick)	Bears 17–9
4	PHI	Lee Bouggess 10-yard run (Mark Moseley kick)	Bears 17–16
4	CHI	Mac Percival 36-yard field goal	bears 20–16

The game got off to bad start when Chicago Bears kickoff returner Cecil Turner had a 96-yard game opening kickoff return for a touchdown. Mark Moseley would miss the extra point when the Eagles answered with a touchdown of their own later in the 1st quarter meaning that they were not losing the game only from the opening kickoff to the time it took Turner to return it. Three times during the game the Bears would lead the Eagles by one point.

=== Week 8 ===
Team	1	2	3	4	Total
Dolphins	0	0	0	17	17
• Eagles	0	17	7	0	24

- Date: November 8
- Location: Franklin Field • Philadelphia, Pennsylvania
- Game start: 1:00 p.m. EST
- Referee: Tommy Bell

Scoring summary
2	PHI	Harold Jackson 31-yard pass from Norm Snead (Mark Moseley kick)	Eagles 7–0
2	PHI	Mark Moseley 23-yard field goal	Eagles 10–0
2	PHI	Harold Jackson 15-yard pass from Norm Snead (Mark Moseley kick)	Eagles 17–0
3	PHI	Steve Zabel 2-yard pass from Norm Snead (Mark Moseley kick)	Eagles 24–0
4	MIA	Garo Yepremian 24-yard field goal	Eagles 24–3
4	MIA	Paul Warfield 52-yard pass from John Stofa (Garo Yepremian kick)	Eagles 24–10
4	MIA	Willie Richardson 27-yard pass from John Stofa (Garo Yepremian kick)	Eagles 24–17

In week 8 the Eagles marked their first time playing a former AFL team in the regular season by winning 24–17 for their 1st win of the 1970 season. The defense of Philadelphia would force the Miami quarterbacks (Bob Griese 3 and John Stofa 1) to throw 4 interceptions. Miami kick returner Mercury Morris would average over 26 yards on 4 kickoff returns.

=== Week 9 ===
Team	1	2	3	4	Total
Falcons	7	3	0	3	13
Eagles	3	3	0	7	13

- Date: November 15
- Location: Franklin Field • Philadelphia, Pennsylvania
- Game start: 1:00 p.m. EST
- Referee: Bob Finley
- Television network: CBS

Scoring summary
1	PHI	Mark Moseley 41-yard field goal	Eagles 3–0
1	ATL	Jim Mitchell 2-yard pass from Bob Berry (Ken Vinyard kick)	Falcons 7–3
2	PHI	Mark Moseley 17-yard field goal	Falcons 7–6
2	ATL	Ken Vinyard 15-yard field goal	Falcons 10–6
3	ATL	Ken Vinyard 32-yard field goal	Falcons 13–6
4	PHI	Steve Preece 21-yard fumble return (Mark Moseley kick)	Tie 13–13

The Eagles did not score an offensive touchdown, but an aggressive defense harassed Atlanta quarterback Bob Berry for most of the game and scored a touchdown of its own when Steve Preece returned a fumble 21 yards after Gary Pettigrew blindsided Harmon Wages on an attempted halfback option pass. Philadelphia had a chance to win the game in the closing seconds, but Mark Moseley blew a chip shot field goal attempt.

=== Week 10 ===
Team	1	2	3	4	Total
Giants	3	10	7	0	20
• Eagles	0	9	7	7	23

- Date: November 23
- Location: Franklin Field • Philadelphia, Pennsylvania
- Game start: 9:00 p.m. EST
- Game attendance: 59,117
- Game weather: 46 °F (8 °C) • Wind 16 mph (26 km/h)
- Referee: Jack Vest
- TV announcers (ABC): Keith Jackson, Howard Cosell, and Don Meredith

Scoring summary
1		NYG	Pete Gogolak 29-yard field goal	Giants 3–0
2		PHI	Norm Snead 1-yard run (kick failed)	Eagles 6–3
2		NYG	Ron Johnson 2-yard run (Pete Gogolak kick)	Giants 10–6
2	:36	NYG	Pete Gogolak 25-yard field goal	Giants 13–6
2		PHI	Mark Moseley 29-yard field goal	Giants 13–9
3		PHI	Fred Hill 1-yard pass from Norm Snead (Mark Moseley kick)	Eagles 16–13
3		NYG	Fran Tarkenton 1-yard run (Pete Gogolak kick)	Giants 20–16
4		PHI	Norm Snead 1-yard run (Mark Moseley kick)	Eagles 23–20

=== Week 14 ===
Team	1	2	3	4	Total
Steelers	7	7	3	3	20
• Eagles	6	14	0	10	30

- Date: December 20
- Location: Franklin Field • Philadelphia, Pennsylvania
- Game start: 1:00 p.m. EST
- Referee: Bob Finley
- Television network: NBC

Scoring summary
1	PIT	John Fuqua 72-yard run (Allan Watson kick)	Steelers 7–0
1	PHI	Ben Hawkins 21-yard pass from Norm Snead (kick failed)	Steelers 7–6
2	PHI	Mike Dirks recovered fumble in end zone (Mark Moseley kick)	Eagles 13–7
2	PIT	John Fuqua 85-yard run (Allan Watson kick)	Steelers 14–13
2	PHI	Gary Ballman 19-yard pass from Norm Snead (Mark Moseley kick)	Eagles 20–14
3	PIT	Allan Watson 21-yard field goal	Eagles 20–17
4	PIT	Allan Watson 17-yard field goal	Tie 20–20
4	PHI	Mark Moseley 18-yard field goal	Eagles 23–20
4	PHI	Larry Watkins 1-yard run (Mark Moseley kick)	Eagles 30–20

In week 14 the Eagles played the cross state rival Pittsburgh Steelers in the final NFL game at Franklin Field. Frenchy Fuqua had two long runs for touchdowns, one for 72 yards and another for 85 yards, both in the first half. Mark Moseley would miss his 3rd extra point of the year. His 14th field goal of the year, out of 25 attempted, in the 4th quarter gave the Eagles the lead for good. He would be cut during the 1971 training camp, play for the Houston Oilers for 13 games over two years, then settle in Washington for 10 years becoming the last straight on kicking style kicker left in the NFL. He won the Most Valuable Player Award during the strike-shortened 1982 season. He is the only placekicker to win the award.

=== Standings ===
NFC East
	W	L	T	PCT	DIV	CONF	PF	PA	STK
Dallas Cowboys	10	4	0	.714	5–3	7–4	299	221	W5
New York Giants	9	5	0	.643	6–2	6–5	301	270	L1
St. Louis Cardinals	8	5	1	.615	5–3	6–5	325	228	L3
Washington Redskins	6	8	0	.429	3–5	4–7	297	314	W2
Philadelphia Eagles	3	10	1	.231	1–7	1–9–1	241	332	W1

Note: Tie games were not officially counted in the standings until 1972.

== Playoffs ==
The Eagles failed to make the playoffs for the 1970 season.
