= 1967 USC Trojans football team =

American college football season

1967 USC Trojans football

Consensus national champion AAWU champion Rose Bowl champion

Rose Bowl, W 14–3 vs. Indiana
- Conference: Athletic Association of Western Universities

Ranking
- Coaches: No. 1
- AP: No. 1
- Record: 10–1 (6–1 AAWU)
- Head coach: John McKay (8th season)
- Defensive coordinator: Dick Coury (2nd season)
- Captains: Tim Rossovich; Adrian Young
- Home stadium: Los Angeles Memorial Coliseum

1967 Athletic Association of Western Universities football standings
	Conf.					Overall
Team	W		L		T	W		L		T
No. 1 USC $	6	–	1	–	0	10	–	1	–	0
No. 7 Oregon State	4	–	1	–	1	7	–	2	–	1
UCLA	4	–	1	–	1	7	–	2	–	1
Stanford	3	–	4	–	0	5	–	5	–	0
Washington	3	–	4	–	0	5	–	5	–	0
California	2	–	3	–	0	5	–	5	–	0
Oregon	1	–	5	–	0	2	–	8	–	0
Washington State	1	–	5	–	0	2	–	8	–	0
$ – Conference champion; Rankings from AP Poll

The 1967 USC Trojans football team represented the University of Southern California (USC) in the 1967 NCAA University Division football season. In their eighth year under head coach John McKay, the Trojans compiled a 10–1 record (6–1 against conference opponents), won the Athletic Association of Western Universities (AAWU or Pac-8) championship, and outscored their opponents by a combined total of 258 to 87. The team was ranked #1 in the final AP and Coaches Polls.

Steve Sogge led the team in passing, completing 75 of 151 passes for 1,032 yards with seven touchdowns and seven interceptions. O. J. Simpson led the team in rushing with 291 carries for 1,543 yards and 13 touchdowns. Earl McCullouch led the team in receiving with 30 catches for 540 yards and five touchdowns. Simpson won the Walter Camp Award.

== Schedule ==
Date	Opponent	Rank	Site	Result	Attendance	Source
September 15	Washington State	No. 7	Los Angeles Memorial Coliseum; Los Angeles, CA	W 49–0	44,364	
September 23	No. 5 Texas*	No. 4	Los Angeles Memorial Coliseum; Los Angeles, CA	W 17–13	67,705	
September 30	at Michigan State*	No. 2	Spartan Stadium; East Lansing, MI	W 21–17	75,287	
October 7	Stanford	No. 1	Los Angeles Memorial Coliseum; Los Angeles, CA (rivalry)	W 30–0	62,598	
October 14	at No. 5 Notre Dame*	No. 1	Notre Dame Stadium; Notre Dame, IN (rivalry)	W 24–7	59,075	
October 21	at Washington	No. 1	Husky Stadium; Seattle, WA	W 23–6	57,533	
October 28	Oregon^{†}	No. 1	Los Angeles Memorial Coliseum; Los Angeles, CA	W 28–6	48,807	
November 4	at California	No. 1	California Memorial Stadium; Berkeley, CA	W 31–12	43,000	
November 11	at Oregon State	No. 1	Parker Stadium; Corvallis, OR	L 0–3	41,494	
November 18	No. 1 UCLA	No. 4	Los Angeles Memorial Coliseum; Los Angeles, CA (Victory Bell)	W 21–20	90,772	
January 1, 1968	vs. No. 4 Indiana*	No. 1	Rose Bowl; Pasadena, CA (Rose Bowl)	W 14–3	102,946	
*Non-conference game; ^{†}Homecoming; Rankings from AP Poll released prior to the game

== Game summaries ==
=== Washington ===
- OJ Simpson 30 rushes, 235 yards

=== UCLA ===
#1 UCLA Bruins (7–0–1) vs. ##4 USC Trojans (8–1)

Quarter	1	2	3	4	Total
UCLA	7	0	7	6	20
USC	7	7	0	7	21

at Los Angeles Memorial Coliseum, Los Angeles, California

- Date: November 18, 1967
- Game weather: Sunny
- TV announcers (ABC): Chris Schenkel and Bud Wilkinson
- Recap

Game information
First quarter
- UCLA – Greg Jones 12-yard run (Zenon Andrusyshyn kick). UCLA 7–0. Drive:
- USC – Pat Cashman 55-yard interception return (Rikki Aldridge kick). Tie 7–7.

Second quarter

- USC – O. J. Simpson 13-yard run (Rikki Aldridge kick). USC 14–7. Drive:

Third quarter

- UCLA – George Farmer 53-yard pass from Gary Beban (Zenon Andrusyshyn kick). Tie 14–14. Drive:

Fourth quarter

- UCLA – Dave Nuttall -yard pass from Gary Beban (kick blocked). UCLA 20—14. Drive:
- USC – O. J. Simpson 64-yard run (Rikki Aldridge kick). USC 21—20. Drive:

The University of California at Los Angeles, 7-0-1 and ranked Number 1, with senior quarterback Gary Beban as a Heisman Trophy candidate, played the University of Southern California, 8-1 and ranked Number 4, with junior running back O. J. Simpson as a Heisman candidate. This game is widely regarded as the signature game in the UCLA–USC rivalry and the Trojans won the game by a score of 21-20.

== Personnel ==
1967 USC Trojans football team roster
Players
Coaches
Offense

Pos.	#	Name	Class
WR, K	27	Rikki Aldridge
C	66	Dick Allmon
RB		Wilson Bowie
RB	33	Steve Dale
WR	83	Ron Drake
RB		Steve Grady
QB		Mike Holmgren
RB		Mike Hull
OL		Fred Khasigian
WR	84	Bob Klein
WR		Jim Lawrence
G	68	Steve Lehmer
HB	22	Earl McCullouch
TE		Bob Miller
QB	15	Toby Page
G	76	Mike Scarpace
FB	38	Dan Scott
HB	32	O. J. Simpson	Jr
QB	12	Steve Sogge	Sr
OT	74	Mike Taylor
OT	77	Ron Yary	Sr

Defense

Pos.	#	Name	Class
DB		Mike Battle
DB	30	Pat Cashman
DB		Sandy Durko
DL	56	Jimmy Gunn
DL	85	Bill Hayhoe
DB		Bill Jaroncyk
DT	75	Gary Magner
DL		Chip Oliver
DL, K	88	Tim Rossovich
LB		Ty Salness
DL		Willard Scott
LB		Gerry Shaw
DB		Nate Shaw
LB		Jim Snow
LB	50	Adrian Young

Special teams

Pos.	#	Name	Class

Head coach

- John McKay

Coordinators/assistant coaches

Legend

- (C) Team captain
- (S) Suspended
- (I) Ineligible
- Injured
- Redshirt

== Awards and honors ==
- O. J. Simpson, Walter Camp Award
- Ron Yary, Outland Trophy
