= James McCabe =

James McCabe may refer to:

- James D. McCabe (1842–1883), American author
- James McCabe (judge) (1844–1911), Justice of the Indiana Supreme Court
- James H. McCabe (1870–1957), American lawyer and politician
- Jimmy McCabe (1918–1989), Northern Irish footballer
- Jim McCabe (politician) (1922–2019), Australian politician
- James M. McCabe, Associate General Counsel for the Watchtower Bible and Tract Society
- Jim McCabe (broadcaster) (fl. 1990s–2010s), Irish broadcaster
- James McCabe (tennis) (born 2003), Australian tennis player
