= Rossovich =

Rossovich is a surname. Notable people with the surname include:

- Rick Rossovich (born 1957), American actor
- Tim Rossovich (1946–2018), American football player and actor
