= 1967 Washington State Cougars football team =

American college football season

1967 Washington State Cougars football
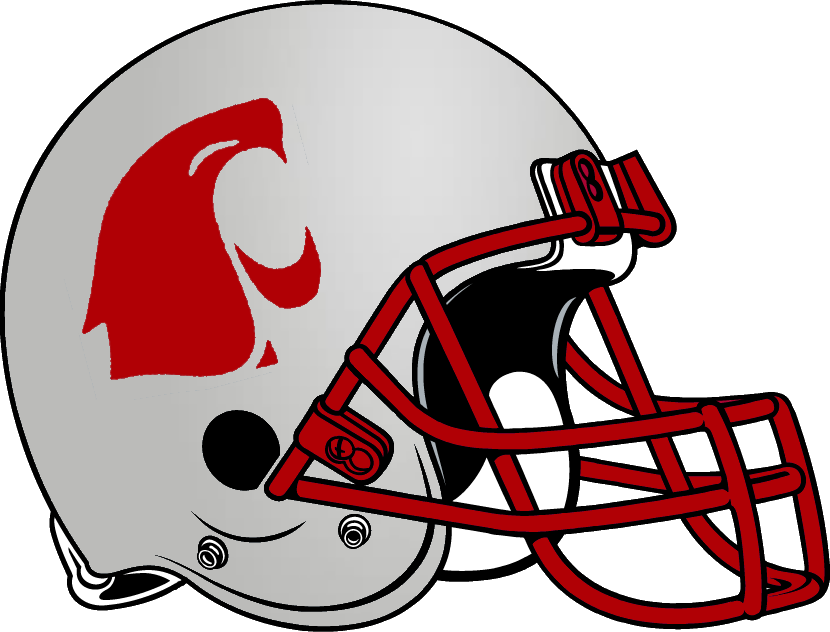
- Conference: Athletic Association of Western Universities
- Record: 2–8 (1–5 AAWU)
- Head coach: Bert Clark (4th season)
- Home stadium: Rogers Field, Joe Albi Stadium

1967 Athletic Association of Western Universities football standings
	Conf.					Overall
Team	W		L		T	W		L		T
No. 1 USC $	6	–	1	–	0	10	–	1	–	0
No. 7 Oregon State	4	–	1	–	1	7	–	2	–	1
UCLA	4	–	1	–	1	7	–	2	–	1
Stanford	3	–	4	–	0	5	–	5	–	0
Washington	3	–	4	–	0	5	–	5	–	0
California	2	–	3	–	0	5	–	5	–	0
Oregon	1	–	5	–	0	2	–	8	–	0
Washington State	1	–	5	–	0	2	–	8	–	0
$ – Conference champion; Rankings from AP Poll

The 1967 Washington State Cougars football team was an American football team that represented Washington State University in the Athletic Association of Western Universities (AAWU) during the 1967 NCAA University Division football season. In their fourth and final season under head coach Bert Clark, the Cougars compiled a 2–8 record (1–5 in AAWU, tied for last), and were outscored 266 to 141.

The team's statistical leaders included Jerry Henderson with 836 passing yards, Mark Williams with 415 rushing yards, and Doug Flansburg with 461 receiving yards.

The Cougars won their first Apple Cup in nine years, a 9–7 win over the Huskies in Seattle. It was the final game on natural grass in Husky Stadium, which switched to AstroTurf in 1968.

The Cougars played six conference opponents and finally met USC and UCLA; both were last on the schedule in 1958, the final season of the Pacific Coast Conference (PCC). The only conference team missed by WSU in 1967 was California.

Clark was fired in late November with a season remaining on his three-year contract. He was succeeded in early January 1968 by Jim Sweeney, the head coach at Montana State in Bozeman, who agreed to a one-year contract at $20,000, and led the Cougars for eight seasons.

== Schedule ==
Date	Opponent	Site	Result	Attendance	Source
September 15	at No. 7 USC	Los Angeles Memorial Coliseum; Los Angeles, CA	L 0–49	44,364	
September 23	at Oklahoma*	Oklahoma Memorial Stadium; Norman, OK	L 0–21	51,700	
September 30	No. 4 UCLA	Joe Albi Stadium; Spokane, WA	L 23–51	24,200	
October 7	at Baylor*	Baylor Stadium; Waco, TX	L 7–10	20,000	
October 14	at Stanford	Stanford Stadium; Stanford, CA	L 10–31	26,000	
October 21	Arizona State*	Joe Albi Stadium; Spokane, WA	L 20–31	16,500	
October 28	at Oregon State	Parker Stadium; Corvallis, OR	L 7–35	18,115	
November 4	Oregon^{†}	Rogers Field; Pullman, WA	L 13–17	18,200	
November 11	Idaho*	Rogers Field; Pullman, WA (rivalry)	W 52–14	15,100	
November 25	at Washington	Husky Stadium; Seattle, WA (Apple Cup)	W 9–7	47,500	
*Non-conference game; ^{†}Homecoming; Rankings from AP Poll released prior to the game

== Roster ==
1967 Washington State Cougars football team roster
Players
Coaches
Offense

Pos.	#	Name	Class
OT	74	Bruce Abbott	Jr
QB, S	10	Mike Cadigan	Sr
FB	22	Del Carmichael	Sr
HB	14	Johnny Davis	So
SE	80	Doug Flansburg	Sr
OT	73	Dave Golinsky	Jr
QB	5	Hank Grenda	Jr
C	50	Dave Harris	Jr
QB	8	Jerry Henderson	Jr
FB	25	Joe Lynn	Sr
G	63	Jack McTaggart	Sr
G	68	Dave Middendorf	Sr
HB	40	Glen Shaw	Jr
TE	42	Bob Simpson	Sr
TE	81	Ron Souza	Jr
SE	35	Larry Thatcher	Jr
HB	13	Mark Williams	Jr

Defense

Pos.	#	Name	Class
LB	60	Dick Baird	Sr
LB	61	Steve Bartelle	Jr
DT	65	Hank Bendix	So
DT	86	Gary Branson	So
LB	65	Steve Boots	Sr
DT	52	Greg Elliot	Sr
CB	26	Greg Field	Jr
DT	70	Jim Guinn	Jr
S	9	Lee Omlid	So
CB	14	Rick Reed	Jr
S	44	Steve Shoun	So
DE	91	J.D. Smith	Jr
DE	88	Wayne Swayda	Jr
DT	77	Steve Van Sinderen	Jr
DT	55	Jim Vest	Jr
LB	34	Mark Wicks	Sr

Special teams

Pos.	#	Name	Class
PK	89	Neil Anderson	Sr
P	4	Jim Engstrom	Sr

Head coach

- Bert Clark (4th year)

Coordinators/assistant coaches

- Laurie Niemi
- King Block
- Red Smith
- Jim Shanley
- John Nelson
- Sam Adams

Legend

- (C) Team captain
- (S) Suspended
- (I) Ineligible
- Injured
- Redshirt

== NFL/AFL draft ==
One Cougar was selected in the 1968 NFL/AFL draft.

Player	Position	Round	Overall	Franchise
Dave Middendorf	Guard	5	172	Cincinnati Bengals
