= 1967 Stanford Indians football team =

American college football season

1967 Stanford Indians football
- Conference: Athletic Association of Western Universities
- Record: 5–5 (3–4 AAWU)
- Head coach: John Ralston (5th season)
- Home stadium: Stanford Stadium

1967 Athletic Association of Western Universities football standings
	Conf.					Overall
Team	W		L		T	W		L		T
No. 1 USC $	6	–	1	–	0	10	–	1	–	0
No. 7 Oregon State	4	–	1	–	1	7	–	2	–	1
UCLA	4	–	1	–	1	7	–	2	–	1
Stanford	3	–	4	–	0	5	–	5	–	0
Washington	3	–	4	–	0	5	–	5	–	0
California	2	–	3	–	0	5	–	5	–	0
Oregon	1	–	5	–	0	2	–	8	–	0
Washington State	1	–	5	–	0	2	–	8	–	0
$ – Conference champion; Rankings from AP Poll

The 1967 Stanford Indians football team represented Stanford University as a member of the Athletic Association of Western Universities (AAWU) during the 1967 NCAA University Division football season. Led by fifth-year head coach John Ralston, the Indians compiled an overall record of 5–5 with a mark of 3–4 in conference play, tying for fourth place in the AAWU. The team played home games at Stanford Stadium in Stanford, California.

== Schedule ==
Date	Opponent	Site	Result	Attendance	Source
September 16	at Oregon State	Civic Stadium; Portland, OR	L 7–13	22,570	
September 23	Kansas*	Stanford Stadium; Stanford, CA	W 21–20	26,000	
September 30	at San Jose State*	Stanford Stadium; Stanford, CA (rivalry)	W 28–14	37,000	
October 7	at No. 1 USC	Los Angeles Memorial Coliseum; Los Angeles, CA (rivalry)	L 0–30	62,598	
October 14	Washington State	Stanford Stadium; Stanford, CA	W 31–10	26,000	
October 21	No. 3 UCLA	Stanford Stadium; Stanford, CA	L 16–21	47,000	
October 28	at Army*	Michie Stadium; West Point, NY	L 20–24	31,500	
November 4	at Washington	Husky Stadium; Seattle, WA	W 14–7	52,500	
November 11	Oregon	Stanford Stadium; Stanford, CA	W 17–14	28,500–29,000	
November 18	California	Stanford Stadium; Stanford, CA (Big Game)	L 3–26	74,500	
*Non-conference game; Rankings from AP Poll released prior to the game

== Players drafted by the NFL ==
Player	Position	Round	Pick	NFL club
Blaine Nye	Guard	5	130	Dallas Cowboys
