= 1967 UCLA Bruins football team =

American college football season

1967 UCLA Bruins football
- Conference: Athletic Association of Western Universities

Ranking
- Coaches: No. 10
- Record: 7–2–1 (4–1–1 AAWU)
- Head coach: Tommy Prothro (3rd season)
- Home stadium: Los Angeles Memorial Coliseum

1967 Athletic Association of Western Universities football standings
	Conf.					Overall
Team	W		L		T	W		L		T
No. 1 USC $	6	–	1	–	0	10	–	1	–	0
No. 7 Oregon State	4	–	1	–	1	7	–	2	–	1
UCLA	4	–	1	–	1	7	–	2	–	1
Stanford	3	–	4	–	0	5	–	5	–	0
Washington	3	–	4	–	0	5	–	5	–	0
California	2	–	3	–	0	5	–	5	–	0
Oregon	1	–	5	–	0	2	–	8	–	0
Washington State	1	–	5	–	0	2	–	8	–	0
$ – Conference champion; Rankings from AP Poll

The 1967 UCLA Bruins football team represented the University of California, Los Angeles (UCLA) in the 1967 NCAA University Division football season. The Bruins competed in what was then officially known as the Athletic Association of Western Universities, but informally known as the Pacific-8 Conference, a name it would formally adopt in June 1968.

The Bruins offense scored 284 points while the defense allowed 161 points.

== Schedule ==
Date	Opponent	Rank	Site	Result	Attendance	Source
September 16	No. 9 Tennessee*	No. 8	Los Angeles Memorial Coliseum; Los Angeles, CA	W 20–16	66,708	
September 23	at Pittsburgh*	No. 6	Pitt Stadium; Pittsburgh, PA	W 40–8	31,210	
September 30	at Washington State	No. 4	Joe Albi Stadium; Spokane, WA	W 51–23	24,200	
October 7	at Penn State*	No. 3	Beaver Stadium; University Park, PA	W 17–15	48,233	
October 14	California	No. 4	Los Angeles Memorial Coliseum; Los Angeles, CA (rivalry)	W 37–14	48,916	
October 21	at Stanford	No. 3	Stanford Stadium; Stanford, CA	W 21–16	47,000	
November 4	Oregon State	No. 2	Los Angeles Memorial Coliseum; Los Angeles, CA	T 16–16	50,172	
November 11	Washington	No. 4	Los Angeles Memorial Coliseum; Los Angeles, CA	W 48–0	46,368	
November 18	at No. 4 USC	No. 1	Los Angeles Memorial Coliseum; Los Angeles, CA (Victory Bell)	L 20–21	90,772	
November 25	Syracuse*	No. 4	Los Angeles Memorial Coliseum; Los Angeles, CA	L 14–32	36,177	
*Non-conference game; Rankings from AP Poll released prior to the game

== Personnel ==
1967 UCLA Bruins football team roster
Players
Coaches
Offense

Pos.	#	Name	Class
G	63	Ken Bajema
QB	16	Gary Beban	Sr
OT	79	Gordon Bosserman
FB	22	Harold Busby
C	56	John Erquiaga
E	85	George Farmer
HB	43	Greg Jones
G	68	Dennis Murphy
WR	89	Dave Nuttall
HB	33	Rick Purdy
OT	77	Larry Slagle
WR	87	Rich Spindler

Defense

Pos.	#	Name	Class

Special teams

Pos.	#	Name	Class
K, P	51	Zenon Andrusyshyn

Head coach

- Tommy Prothro (3rd year)

Coordinators/assistant coaches

Legend

- (C) Team captain
- (S) Suspended
- (I) Ineligible
- Injured
- Redshirt

== Season summary ==
=== USC ===
#1 UCLA Bruins (7–0–1) vs. ##4 USC Trojans (8–1)

Quarter	1	2	3	4	Total
UCLA	7	0	7	6	20
USC	7	7	0	7	21

at Los Angeles Memorial Coliseum, Los Angeles, California

- Date: November 18, 1967
- Game weather: Sunny
- TV announcers (ABC): Chris Schenkel and Bud Wilkinson
- Recap

Game information
First quarter
- UCLA – Greg Jones 12-yard run (Zenon Andrusyshyn kick). UCLA 7–0. Drive:
- USC – Pat Cashman 55-yard interception return (Rikki Aldridge kick). Tie 7–7.

Second quarter

- USC – O.J. Simpson 13-yard run (Rikki Aldridge kick). USC 14–7. Drive:

Third quarter

- UCLA – George Farmer 53-yard pass from Gary Beban (Zenon Andrusyshyn kick). Tie 14–14. Drive:

Fourth quarter

- UCLA – Dave Nuttall -yard pass from Gary Beban (kick blocked). UCLA 20—14. Drive:
- USC – O.J. Simpson 64-yard run (Rikki Aldridge kick). USC 21—20. Drive:

== Team players drafted into the NFL/AFL ==
Player	Position	Round	Pick	NFL/AFL club
Gary Beban	Quarterback	2	30	Los Angeles Rams
Larry Slagle	Guard	11	285	St. Louis Cardinals
Don Manning	Linebacker	17	436	Cincinnati Bengals

== Awards and honors ==
- Gary Beban, Heisman Trophy
- Gary Beban, Maxwell Award
