= 1967 Oregon Ducks football team =

American college football season

1967 Oregon Ducks football
- Conference: Athletic Association of Western Universities
- Record: 2–8 (1–5 AAWU)
- Head coach: Jerry Frei (1st season)
- Captains: Jim Smith; Cam Molter
- Home stadium: Autzen Stadium (natural grass)

1967 Athletic Association of Western Universities football standings
	Conf.					Overall
Team	W		L		T	W		L		T
No. 1 USC $	6	–	1	–	0	10	–	1	–	0
No. 7 Oregon State	4	–	1	–	1	7	–	2	–	1
UCLA	4	–	1	–	1	7	–	2	–	1
Stanford	3	–	4	–	0	5	–	5	–	0
Washington	3	–	4	–	0	5	–	5	–	0
California	2	–	3	–	0	5	–	5	–	0
Oregon	1	–	5	–	0	2	–	8	–	0
Washington State	1	–	5	–	0	2	–	8	–	0
$ – Conference champion; Rankings from AP Poll

The 1967 Oregon Ducks football team represented the University of Oregon during the 1967 NCAA University Division football season. All five home games were played on campus in Eugene at the new Autzen Stadium, opened this season with a natural grass field (and replaced with AstroTurf two years later).

Under first-year head coach Jerry Frei, the Ducks were 2–8 overall and 1–5 in the Athletic Association of Western Universities (AAWU, later renamed Pacific-8), in a tie for seventh place, and were outscored 193 to 104. The Ducks met USC for the first time since 1958, the final Pacific Coast Conference (PCC) season. (UCLA was similarly off of UO's schedule until 1969).

Oregon's two victories came against the Palouse neighbors, Idaho and Washington State. After opening with five losses, shutouts in the last three, the 31–6 win over the Vandals on October 21 was the first for Frei and the first for Oregon in Autzen Stadium. The Ducks traveled to Pullman two weeks later and defeated the Cougars 17–13 for their sole conference win. In between, they lost 28–6 to top-ranked USC in Los Angeles, but held junior running back O. J. Simpson to just 63 yards on 23 carries. He was similarly contained the following season in Eugene.

In the season-ending Civil War game at Autzen, the visiting #8 Oregon State "Giant Killers" were held scoreless for three quarters, but reached the end zone twice in the fourth period to win 14–10, their fourth straight in the rivalry.

Oregon's statistical leaders in 1967 were Eric Olson with 840 passing yards, Claxton Welch with 474 rushing yards, and Roger Smith with 402 receiving yards.

== Schedule ==
Date	Opponent	Site	Result	Attendance	Source
September 16	at California	Memorial Stadium; Berkeley, CA	L 13–21	20,000	
September 23	No. 9 Colorado*	Autzen Stadium; Eugene, OR	L 13–17	27,500	
September 30	at Utah*	Ute Stadium; Salt Lake City, UT	L 0–21	17,118	
October 7	Ohio State*	Autzen Stadium; Eugene, OR	L 0–30	25,000	
October 14	Washington	Autzen Stadium; Eugene, OR (rivalry)	L 0–26	33,500	
October 21	Idaho*	Autzen Stadium; Eugene, OR	W 31–6	16,000	
October 28	at No. 1 USC	Los Angeles Memorial Coliseum; Los Angeles, CA	L 6–28	48,807	
November 4	at Washington State	Rogers Field; Pullman, WA	W 17–13	18,200	
November 11	at Stanford	Stanford Stadium; Stanford, CA	L 14–17	28,500–29,000	
November 18	No. 8 Oregon State	Autzen Stadium; Eugene, OR (Civil War)	L 10–14	40,100	
*Non-conference game; Rankings from AP Poll released prior to the game
