= Bill Hayhoe =

American football player (born 1946)

No. 77
- Position: Offensive tackle

Personal information
- Born: September 6, 1946; Los Angeles, California, U.S.
- Listed height: 6 ft 8 in (2.03 m)
- Listed weight: 258 lb (117 kg)

Career information
- High school: Birmingham (Los Angeles)
- College: USC
- NFL draft: 1969: 5th round, 116th overall pick

Career history
- Green Bay Packers (1969–1973)

Awards and highlights
- National champion (1967)

Career NFL statistics
- Games played: 61
- Games started: 0
- Fumble recoveries: 1
- Stats at Pro Football Reference

William J. Hayhoe II (born September 6, 1946) is an American former professional football player who was an offensive tackle for the Green Bay Packers of the National Football League (NFL). He played college football at Los Angeles Valley College before transferring to the USC Trojans. Hayhoe was selected by the Packers in the fifth round of the 1969 NFL/AFL draft. He played professionally for five seasons and retired in 1973.

In 1967, he played a key role in beating UCLA and helping his team win an eventual national championship, when he blocked two field goals and affected the efficiency of placekicker Zenon Andrusyshyn (he also missed a field goal and a critical extra point). Then USC head coach John McKay, remarked that "Andrusyshyn kicks with low leverage,".
