= Skip Vanderbundt =

American football player (born 1946)

No. 52
- Position: Linebacker

Personal information
- Born: December 4, 1946 (age 79); Martinez, California, U.S.
- Listed height: 6 ft 3 in (1.91 m)
- Listed weight: 225 lb (102 kg)

Career information
- High school: El Dorado (Placerville, California)
- College: Oregon State
- NFL draft: 1968: 3rd round, 69th overall pick

Career history
- San Francisco 49ers (1969–1977); New Orleans Saints (1978)

Awards and highlights
- First-team All-Pac-8 (1967)

Career NFL statistics
- Fumble recoveries: 7
- Interceptions: 14
- Touchdowns: 3
- Sacks: 8
- Stats at Pro Football Reference

William Gerard "Skip" Vanderbundt (born December 4, 1946) is an American former professional football player who was a linebacker in the National Football League (NFL) from 1969 to 1978.

He played college football for the Oregon State Beavers and was selected in the third round (69th overall) by the San Francisco 49ers in the 1968 NFL draft. He played for the 49ers until the 1978 season, after which he played for the New Orleans Saints in his last year.
