= Don Summers =

American football player (born 1961)

No. 85, 96
- Position: Tight end

Personal information
- Born: February 22, 1961 (age 65); Grants Pass, Oregon, U.S.
- Listed height: 6 ft 4 in (1.93 m)
- Listed weight: 235 lb (107 kg)

Career information
- High school: North Medford (Medford, Oregon)
- College: Oregon Tech (1980–1981, basketball); Boise State (1982–1983)
- NFL draft: 1984: undrafted

Career history
- Oakland Invaders (1984)*; Denver Broncos (1984–1985); Green Bay Packers (1986–1987)
- * Offseason or practice squad member only
- Stats at Pro Football Reference

Donald O. Summers (born February 22, 1961) is an American former professional football player. After playing basketball in high school, he played in college at the Oregon Institute of Technology for the Oregon Tech Hustlin' Owls. After two years there, he transferred to Boise State University, where he switched to football and played two seasons as a tight end for the Boise State Broncos football team. After college, he began his professional career with the Oakland Invaders of the United States Football League (USFL) and, after a brief stint with them, signed with the Denver Broncos of the National Football League (NFL). He made the Broncos' roster and played two seasons. Summers was later a member of the Green Bay Packers and appeared in three games during the 1987 NFL strike as a replacement player.

== Early life and college ==
Summers was born on February 22, 1961, in Grants Pass, Oregon. He attended Eagle Point High School in Eagle Point before transferring to North Medford High School in Medford. In high school, he was a top basketball player and played as a center, earning Skyline League player of the year honors in 1978. After high school, he enrolled at the Oregon Institute of Technology in 1980, attending from 1980 to 1981. At Oregon Tech, he played basketball, being selected an honorable mention NAIA District 2 all-star as a sophomore when he averaged 16 points and 11 rebounds per game.

After getting married, Summers moved and transferred to Boise State University in 1983 with no money "other than what he'd borrowed from his mother ... no jobs, [and] no friends except for Boise State assistant basketball coach Mike Conklin". He changed his position from center to power forward but was not in a position to receive much playing time. He was encouraged by football coaches to join the football team but was initially skeptical. Eventually, he talked with the head coach who told him that "If you come out and show you're not afraid to hit, you've got a scholarship next season". He decided to join the Boise State Broncos football team as a tight end, though he was injured for much of the 1982 season. As a senior in 1983, he caught 25 passes for 377 yards and three touchdowns.

== Professional career and later life ==
Summers signed with the Oakland Invaders of the United States Football League (USFL) on January 8, 1984, but was then released on January 30. After going unselected in the 1984 NFL draft, he signed with the Denver Broncos on May 2, 1984, as an undrafted free agent. Summers impressed coach Dan Reeves with a touchdown he scored in preseason against the Washington Redskins and ultimately made the team as an H-back. He made his NFL debut in Week 1 against the Cincinnati Bengals and ended up appearing in all 16 games for the Broncos during the 1984 season. He started one game, against the San Diego Chargers, and recorded three receptions for 32 yards on the season. He was released by the Broncos on August 26, 1985, but then was re-signed on September 17. Summers appeared in the team's next two games, but was then released again.

Summers signed with the Green Bay Packers on May 2, 1986. Despite performing well in training camp, he was waived by the Packers on August 25. After being released, he returned to Idaho and began selling cars. According to the Green Bay Press-Gazette, he went 402 days without catching a football or lifting a barbell, and the "furthest thing from his mind was pro football". However, when the NFL Players Association went on strike in 1987, Packers assistant Burt Gustafson contacted Summers in hopes of signing him as a replacement player. Although Summers initially declined, after further discussion with head coach Forrest Gregg and executive Tom Braatz, he decided to sign with the team. He appeared in each of the three games during the strike and started one, catching seven passes for 83 yards and a touchdown. He was placed on injured reserve at the end of the strike, on October 19, after suffering knee ligament damage in his last game. He was waived by the Packers on August 21, 1988, ending his professional career. In 21 games played, he caught 10 passes for 115 yards and a touchdown.

Summers had a son. After his stint with the Packers, he returned to selling cars and coached basketball at Meridian High School. After his NFL career, he was interviewed by The Idaho Statesman and said that he could have played longer if he had used steroids, "But I didn't want to share my accomplishments with a syringe or pill". He was also outspoken against teen steroid use.
