= 1968 Rose Bowl =

American college football game

- 54th Rose Bowl Game
USC Trojans	Indiana Hoosiers
(9–1)	(9–1)
Pac-8	Big Ten
14	3
Head coach: John McKay	Head coach: John Pont
AP / Coaches; 1 / 1	AP / Coaches; 4 / 6
	1	2	3	4	Total
USC	7	0	7	0	14
Indiana	0	3	0	0	3
- Date: January 1, 1968
- Season: 1967
- Stadium: Rose Bowl
- Location: Pasadena, California
- MVP: O. J. Simpson (USC TB)
- Favorite: USC by 14 points
- Referee: Gene Calhoun (Big Ten) (split crew: Big Ten, AAWU)
- Halftime show: Spirit of Troy, Indiana University Marching Hundred
- Attendance: 102,996

United States TV coverage
- Network: NBC
- Announcers: Curt Gowdy, Paul Christman
- Nielsen ratings: 28.7

The 1968 Rose Bowl was the 54th edition of the college football bowl game, played at the Rose Bowl in Pasadena, California, on Monday, January 1. The USC Trojans of the Pacific-8 Conference defeated the Indiana Hoosiers of the Big Ten Conference, 14–3. USC tailback O. J. Simpson was named the Player of the Game.

== Teams ==
This remained the only Rose Bowl appearance for Indiana until the 2026 Rose Bowl. USC was a two touchdown favorite; this was the first Rose Bowl in fifteen years in which the West Coast team was favored. In the intervening fourteen games, the Big Ten had won ten and lost four (1960, 1961, 1963, 1966).

Being an even-numbered year for the bowl game, Indiana wore their crimson jerseys as the home team and USC wore their white shirts as the designated visitors.

=== USC ===
The top-ranked and Pac-8 champion Trojans came into the game with a 9–1 record, losing only at Oregon State in the November mud in a close 3–0 game. They fell to fourth in the AP poll, then reclaimed the top spot a week later after a close 21–20 win over rival and then-#1 UCLA in their heavily-anticipated conference finale, securing another trip to the Big Ten/Pac-8 classic. Runner-up Oregon State had a conference loss (at Washington) and a tie (at UCLA), and the deflated UCLA Bruins lost again the following week 32–14 at home to non-conference Syracuse.

The Trojans were led by their powerful junior tailback O. J. Simpson, a junior college transfer from San Francisco. Unlike the Big Ten and the old Pacific Coast Conference, the Pac-8 did not have a "no-repeat" rule; this was the second of four consecutive Rose Bowl appearances for the Trojans.

=== Indiana ===
The fourth-ranked and co-Big Ten champion Hoosiers also came into the game with a 9–1 record, losing to Minnesota, a week before defeating Purdue. A three-way league title championship was created when all three finished with 6–1 league records, each defeating and losing to one of the other. Purdue was ineligible because of the "no-repeat" rule by the Big Ten and the "Rose Bowl or no bowl" rule enforced by both of the participating conferences (Big Ten and AAWU). Purdue had played in Pasadena the previous year, beating USC by a point, 14–13.

The conference's athletic directors voted to award the Rose Bowl bid to Indiana over Minnesota, albeit not unanimously. Indiana was considered the logical choice because they were the only Big Ten school yet to appear in the game. Minnesota coach Murray Warmath argued in vain that the Gophers deserved the bid because their prior two Rose Bowl teams, after the 1960 and 1961 seasons, received at-large bids because there was no agreement between the Big Ten and the Rose Bowl at the time; thus, technically, the Gophers never had received a Rose Bowl bid pursuant to that arrangement. Ironically, if Purdue had beaten Indiana in the season finale, the Boilermakers would have had sole possession of the conference championship, but Minnesota presumably would have received the Rose Bowl bid as the second place team in lieu of the ineligible Boilers. Instead, Indiana scored a 19–14 upset over Purdue, giving Minnesota a share of the conference championship but costing them a trip to Pasadena. Quarterback Harry Gonso led the Hoosiers into their first ever bowl game.

== Scoring ==
=== First quarter ===
- USC - O. J. Simpson 2-yard run (Rikki Aldridge kick)

=== Second quarter ===
- Indiana - Dave Kornowa 27-yard field goal

=== Third quarter ===
- USC - Simpson 8-yard run (Aldridge kick)

=== Fourth quarter ===
No scoring
