= Dean Halverson =

American football player (born 1946)

No. 56, 59
- Position: Linebacker

Personal information
- Born: August 24, 1946 (age 80); Olympia, Washington, U.S.
- Listed height: 6 ft 2 in (1.88 m)
- Listed weight: 230 lb (104 kg)

Career information
- High school: Olympia
- College: Washington (1964-1967)
- NFL draft: 1968: 13th round, 351st overall pick

Career history
- Los Angeles Rams (1968); Atlanta Falcons (1970); Los Angeles Rams (1971–1972); Philadelphia Eagles (1973–1975)

Awards and highlights
- First-team All-Pac-8 (1967)

Career NFL statistics
- Fumble recoveries: 3
- Sacks: 1
- Stats at Pro Football Reference

Dean Halverson (August 24, 1946) is an American former professional football player who was a linebacker for seven seasons in the National Football League (NFL) for the Los Angeles Rams, Atlanta Falcons, and Philadelphia Eagles.

Born and raised in Olympia, Washington, Halverson played college football for the Washington Huskies in Seattle under head coach Jim Owens. He was selected in the 13th round of the 1968 NFL/AFL draft by the Rams with the 351st overall pick.
