= Steve Sogge =

American football and baseball player (born 1947)

Profile
- Position: Quarterback

Personal information
- Born: April 20, 1947 (age 79)
- Listed height: 5 ft 10 in (1.78 m)
- Listed weight: 174 lb (79 kg)

Career information
- High school: Gardena
- College: USC (1966–1968)

Awards and highlights
- National champion (1967); Third-team All-American (1968); First-team All-Pac-8 (1968)

Steven Sogge (born April 20, 1947) is an American former football and baseball player.

Sogge played at the quarterback position for Gardena High School. He passed for 2,361 yards as a senior and was selected as a Parade All-American. In 2021, USA Today rated him as one of the ten greatest quarterbacks in California high school football history.

Sogge played at the quarterback position for the USC Trojans football team from 1966 to 1968. He was the starting quarterback of the 1967 USC Trojans football team that won the national championship and the 1968 team that was ranked No. 2 in the final Coaches Poll. He was also selected by the AP, UPI, and Pac-8 coaches as the first-team quarterback on the 1968 All-Pacific-8 Conference football team.

Sogge also played baseball as a catcher for USC. In January 1969, he signed a minor-league contract with the Los Angeles Dodgers. He played in the minor league for the Albuquerque Dodgers (1969), Spokane Indians (1970), and Tucson Toros (1971).
