= 1967 Washington Huskies football team =

American college football season

1967 Washington Huskies football
- Conference: Athletic Association of Western Universities
- Record: 5–5 (3–4 AAWU)
- Head coach: Jim Owens (11th season)
- Captains: Mac Bledsoe; Dean Halverson; Steve Thompson
- Home stadium: University of Washington Stadium

1967 Athletic Association of Western Universities football standings
	Conf.					Overall
Team	W		L		T	W		L		T
No. 1 USC $	6	–	1	–	0	10	–	1	–	0
No. 7 Oregon State	4	–	1	–	1	7	–	2	–	1
UCLA	4	–	1	–	1	7	–	2	–	1
Stanford	3	–	4	–	0	5	–	5	–	0
Washington	3	–	4	–	0	5	–	5	–	0
California	2	–	3	–	0	5	–	5	–	0
Oregon	1	–	5	–	0	2	–	8	–	0
Washington State	1	–	5	–	0	2	–	8	–	0
$ – Conference champion; Rankings from AP Poll

The 1967 Washington Huskies football team was an American football team that represented the University of Washington during the 1967 NCAA University Division football season. In its eleventh season under head coach Jim Owens, the team compiled a 5–5 record, tied for fourth place in the Athletic Association of Western Universities (Pac-8), and outscored its opponents 136 to 130.

Washington won only two of its six home games; the notable victory was over the "Giant Killers" of Oregon State in the conference opener. The Huskies had just one loss after five games, but won only one of the last five.

This was the last year for natural grass in University of Washington Stadium; AstroTurf was installed prior to the 1968 season.

== Schedule ==
Date	Opponent	Site	Result	Attendance	Source
September 16	Nebraska*	University of Washington Stadium; Seattle, WA	L 7–17	57,000	
September 23	Wisconsin*	University of Washington Stadium; Seattle, WA	W 17–0	54,500	
September 30	at Air Force*	Falcon Stadium; Colorado Springs, CO	W 30–7	34,739	
October 7	Oregon State	University of Washington Stadium; Seattle, WA	W 13–6	55,000	
October 14	at Oregon	Autzen Stadium; Eugene, OR (rivalry)	W 36–0	33,500	
October 21	No. 1 USC	University of Washington Stadium; Seattle, WA	L 6–23	57,533	
October 28	at California	California Memorial Stadium; Berkeley, CA	W 23–6	30,000	
November 4	Stanford	University of Washington Stadium; Seattle, WA	L 7–14	52,500	
November 11	at No. 4 UCLA	Los Angeles Memorial Coliseum; Los Angeles, CA	L 0–48	46,368	
November 25	Washington State	University of Washington Stadium; Seattle, WA (Apple Cup)	L 7–9	49,041	
*Non-conference game; Rankings from AP Poll released prior to the game

== Roster ==
1967 Washington Huskies football team roster
Players
Coaches
Offense

Pos.	#	Name	Class
G	61	Ken Ballenger	So
OT	73	Mac Bledsoe (C)	Sr
RB	28	Jim Cope	Jr
G	60	Jim Harris	Jr
C	56	Ron Hudson	Sr
SE	89	Jeff Huget	Jr
QB	15	Tom Manke	Jr
FB	30	Jim McCabe	Sr
C	54	Bob Schoepper	Jr
OT	75	Avery Schwartz	So
RB	39	Carl Wojciechowski	Jr
SE	92	Harrison Wood	Jr
G	68	Dick Zatkovich	Sr
HB	24	Gerald Wea	Sr

Defense

Pos.	#	Name	Class
DT	72	Bob Anderson	Jr
DB	18	Bob Berg	So
DT	87	Lee Brock	So
DT	99	Bill Glennon	Sr
LB	37	Dean Halverson (C)	Sr
LB	49	George Jugum	Jr
MG	58	Mike Maggart	Jr
DB	17	Bob Pederson	Jr
DT	64	Augie Rios	So
DT	70	Rick Sharp	So
DB	11	Dan Spriesterbach	Jr
DB	13	Bill Sprinkle	Jr
DT	79	Steve Thompson (C)	Sr
DE	98	Otis Washington	Jr
LB	36	Clyde Werner	So
DB	12	Al Worley	Jr

Special teams

Pos.	#	Name	Class
PK, P	5	Don Martin	Sr

Head coach

- Jim Owens (11th year)

Coordinators/assistant coaches

Legend

- (C) Team captain
- (S) Suspended
- (I) Ineligible
- Injured
- Redshirt

== NFL/AFL draft selections ==
Five University of Washington Huskies were selected in the 1968 NFL/AFL draft, which lasted 17 rounds with 462 selections.

= Husky Hall of Fame

Player	Position	Round	Overall	Franchise
Steve Thompson	Defensive end	2nd	44	New York Jets
Don Martin	Placekicker	5th	135	Los Angeles Rams
Bill Glennon	Defensive tackle	7th	189	Pittsburgh Steelers
Bob Richardson	Tackle	9th	243	Los Angeles Rams
Dean Halverson	Linebacker	13th	351	Los Angeles Rams
