= Ron Yary =

American football player (born 1946)

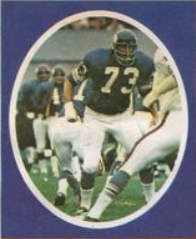
- 1972 stamp of Yary

No. 73
- Position: Tackle

Personal information
- Born: July 16, 1946 (age 80); Chicago, Illinois, U.S.
- Listed height: 6 ft 5 in (1.96 m)
- Listed weight: 255 lb (116 kg)

Career information
- High school: Bellflower (Bellflower, California)
- College: USC (1965–1967)
- NFL draft: 1968: 1st round, 1st overall pick

Career history
- Minnesota Vikings (1968–1981); Los Angeles Rams (1982)

Awards and highlights
- NFL champion (1969); 6× First-team All-Pro (1971–1976); 2× Second-team All-Pro (1970, 1977); 7× Pro Bowl (1971–1977); NFL 1970s All-Decade Team; Minnesota Vikings Ring of Honor; 50 Greatest Vikings; Minnesota Vikings 25th Anniversary Team; Minnesota Vikings 40th Anniversary Team; National champion (1967); Outland Trophy (1967); Unanimous All-American (1967); Consensus All-American (1966); 3× First-team All-Pac-8 (1965, 1966, 1967); Rose Bowl champion (1967)

Career NFL statistics
- Games played: 207
- Games started: 180
- Fumble recoveries: 2
- Stats at Pro Football Reference
- Pro Football Hall of Fame
- College Football Hall of Fame

Anthony Ronald Yary (born July 16, 1946) is an American football tackle who played in the National Football League (NFL) for 15 seasons, primarily with the Minnesota Vikings. He played college football for the USC Trojans, winning the Outland Trophy and earning unanimous All-American honors in 1967 en route to a victory in the 1968 Rose Bowl. Yary was selected by the Vikings first overall in the 1968 NFL draft.

During his 14 seasons with Minnesota, Yary was a central contributor to the team's success during the late 1960s and 1970s. He helped the Vikings become the first franchise to appear in four Super Bowls, including their debut in Super Bowl IV after winning the 1969 NFL Championship Game. Yary also received seven Pro Bowl and six first team All-Pro honors while missing only two games due to injury. In his final season, Yary was a member of the Los Angeles Rams. He was inducted to the Pro Football Hall of Fame in 2001 and the College Football Hall of Fame in 1987.

== Early life ==
Yary attended Bellflower High School in Los Angeles County, California, and then spent one season at Cerritos College in 1964. In October 2001, the school named the football field Ron Yary Stadium. While attending Bellflower High School, Yary starred in football, baseball, and basketball.

== College career ==
Yary was born in Chicago and attended Cerritos College in the fall semester of 1964. He then in the spring semester of (1965) transferred to the University of Southern California, where he was a member of Phi Kappa Psi fraternity. As a sophomore in 1965, Yary was voted the Pac-8 defensive lineman of the year and All-West Coast for his play at defensive tackle. As a junior, he was moved to the offensive line where he was a consensus All-American as a junior in 1966 and a unanimous All-American choice in 1967, his senior year. He was the 1967 winner of both the Outland Trophy and the Knute Rockne Award, awards that annually go to the nation's top collegiate lineman. Yary was the first USC Trojan to win the Outland. In Yary's senior year of 1967 the Trojans won the NCAA football national championship under Coach John McKay. During Yary's three seasons, the Trojans compiled a 24-7-1 record. In 1987 Yary was inducted to the College Football Hall of Fame. He was inducted into the Rose Bowl Hall of Fame on December 30, 2012, representing USC.

== Professional career ==
Yary was the first overall pick of the 1968 NFL draft by the Minnesota Vikings, who had traded Fran Tarkenton to the New York Giants for that selection, becoming the first offensive lineman ever to be selected first overall. He played from 1968 to 1981 with the Minnesota Vikings, and 1982 with the Los Angeles Rams. During Yary's tenure with the Vikings, the team won 11 division titles. During that period, Minnesota won the 1969 NFL championship and NFC titles in 1973, 1974 and 1976, and played in Super Bowls IV, VIII, IX and XI where Yary was one of 11 Players to have played in all four games for the Vikings. Yary was named a first-team All-Pro for six consecutive seasons (1971–76) and second-team All-Pro in 1970 and 1977 and was an All-NFC choice from 1970 through 1977. He played in seven consecutive Pro Bowls, and was a major force in a Minnesota team that was highly successful throughout the 1970s. In addition to his All-pro honors, Yary was voted the NFC Offensive Lineman of the Year three times (1973–75) by the NFLPA and was named the NFL Outstanding Blocker of the Year by the 1,000 yard Club for 1975.

Yary won the starting right tackle job (military duty forced him to miss first three games) on the Vikings offensive line in his second season and remained as a fixture at that spot throughout his Minnesota tenure. He was voted to the 1970s All-Decade First Team after the 1979 season.

Yary was also durable and played in spite of injuries. He missed only two games due to injury—both coming in 1980 when he sat out the first two games while recovering from a broken ankle—in 14 years in Minnesota. Later that same season, he continued to play in spite of a broken foot. He was inducted to the Vikings Ring of Honor in 2000. He became a member of the Pro Football Hall of Fame in 2001. He was the last offensive lineman to ever be drafted first overall until Orlando Pace was selected by Rams in 1997.

== Personal life ==
Yary is married to his wife Jamie and has two sons, Jack (born 2001) and Grant (born 2005) and a daughter, Kinley (born c. 2010). Yary resides in Murrieta, California, and once co-owned a sports photography business with his brother Wayne, who bought Ron out in 2001. His son Jack was a tight end for Murrieta Valley High School, and was committed to play at University of Washington before dropping out of the program. In 1970, Yary married Leslie Katherine Pardue in Hennepin County, Minnesota.
