= James M. McCabe =

American attorney

- Born: James Murray McCabe; Born between late 1945 and mid-1946 Los Angeles
- Other name: Jim McCabe
- Citizenship: United States
- Education: University of San Diego School of Law (JD); University of Washington
- Occupation: Attorney
- Years active: 1972–present
- Employer: Watch Tower Bible and Tract Society of Pennsylvania
- Known for: Serving as Associate General Counsel for the Jehovah's Witnesses, representing the organization in high-profile First Amendment, corporate liability, and institutional litigation.
- Spouse: Melinda (m. 1968)

James "Jim" Murray McCabe is an American attorney primarily recognized for his extensive legal career serving as Associate General Counsel for the Watchtower Bible and Tract Society, the primary legal entity of Jehovah's Witnesses. Over several decades, McCabe has been a prominent legal representative for the organization, handling complex corporate, constitutional, and high-profile liability litigations across the world.

== Life ==
McCabe grew up in the Los Angeles metropolitan area and he was raised in a Catholic household. Jim attained his undergraduate degree at the University of Washington where he attended on a football scholarship playing for the Washington Huskies in Seattle under head coach Jim Owens. McCabe was a two-year fullback and running back from 1966 through 1967, establishing himself as the starting fullback during his senior year (his final year in college).

In 1968, James M. McCabe matriculated at the University of San Diego School of Law. During his initial semesters, McCabe's academic approach was influenced by personal religious obligations, specifically attending Mass under the assumption that spiritual devotion would correlate with high academic achievement. During this first semester, he met Melinda, whom he married the following summer. Shortly after their wedding, following an instance of arriving late to a service, the couple experienced a sense of alienation from the religious community. This event marked a permanent departure from practicing the Catholic faith.

McCabe subsequently completed in 1971 his legal education at the University of San Diego School of Law, earning a Juris Doctor degree. He was admitted to the State Bar of California on January 5, 1972, initially establishing a practice in criminal law and later expanding into personal injury, trusts, and corporate matters.

In the mid-1970s, McCabe underwent a religious conversion after his wife began studying scripture with Jehovah's Witnesses. Following a period of personal theological examination, he was baptized into the faith in 1975. By June 1979, McCabe left his private partnership to enter full-time voluntary ministry for the denomination, and in September 1979, he was appointed to be an overseer.

He eventually transitioned his legal expertise to the organization's headquarters, serving as an organizational overseer and a primary architect of its legal defense frameworks. To facilitate multi-jurisdictional defense, McCabe maintained active legal licenses in multiple states, including California and New York.

== Career and Controversies ==
McCabe's legal career is defined by his defense of the Watchtower Society in cases involving religious freedom, internal church discipline, and organizational liability.

McCabe played a key role as in-house legal counsel and Associate General Counsel for the Watchtower Bible and Tract Society. In this capacity, he traveled across various continents (including Eastern Europe, Latin America, Africa, and Asia) to legally represent the interests of religious minorities and promote freedom of worship before government agencies.

At the national level in the United States, he has led the defense strategy for the Watchtower and various local congregations in civil lawsuits. Among his most high-profile legal interventions was the 2012 litigation in the state of California involving the case of Candace Conti, a civil trial with significant international repercussions related to the religious organization's institutional protocols regarding allegations of child abuse.

=== First Amendment and Church Discipline ===
Throughout his career, McCabe defended the right of religious institutions to establish internal parameters for membership and worship, arguing that institutional autonomy over congregational access is constitutionally protected under the First Amendment.

=== Institutional Liability Litigation ===
In the 2010s, McCabe served as the lead trial attorney defending the Watchtower Society and individual congregations in landmark civil lawsuits regarding allegations of child sexual abuse within the organization (notably the Candace Conti and Fremont, California liability cases).

== Public Statements and Professional Standing ==
In public statements and high-profile media appearances, such as on PBS NewsHour and C-SPAN, McCabe consistently maintained that the religious organization abhors child abuse. Professionally, he argued against the imposition of organizational negligence for the actions of individual rank-and-file members, actively appealing massive punitive damages levied against Watchtower entities.

McCabe remains an active member of the State Bar of California, continuing his practice out of San Diego, California, and the Watchtower facilities in Patterson, New York.
