= George Farmer (wide receiver, born 1948) =

American football player (born 1948)

No. 43, 44
- Position: Wide receiver

Personal information
- Born: April 19, 1948 (age 78); Chattanooga, Tennessee, U.S.
- Listed height: 6 ft 4 in (1.93 m)
- Listed weight: 214 lb (97 kg)

Career information
- High school: La Puente (La Puente, California)
- College: UCLA
- NFL draft: 1970: 3rd round, 54th overall pick

Career history
- Chicago Bears (1970–1975); Detroit Lions (1975)

Awards and highlights
- Second-team All-Pac-8 (1969)

Career NFL statistics
- Receptions: 119
- Receiving yards: 1,995
- Touchdowns: 10
- Stats at Pro Football Reference

George Thaxton Farmer (born April 19, 1948) is an American former professional football player who was a wide receiver for six seasons in the National Football League (NFL). At UCLA, Farmer was a member of the track, football and basketball teams, including the Bruins' 1969 NCAA championship basketball team. Farmer's son Danny also played football at UCLA and at the NFL for the Cincinnati Bengals for three seasons.
