= Zenon Andrusyshyn =

Canadian football player and track and field athlete (1947–2023)

No. 7, 17, 19
- Positions: Kicker, Punter

Personal information
- Born: February 25, 1947; Günzburg, Bavaria, Allied-occupied Germany
- Died: August 7, 2023 (aged 76); Land o' Lakes, Florida, U.S.
- Listed height: 6 ft 2 in (1.88 m)
- Listed weight: 210 lb (95 kg)

Career information
- College: UCLA
- NFL draft: 1970: 9th round, 231st overall pick

Career history
- 1970: Dallas Cowboys*
- 1971–1977: Toronto Argonauts
- 1978: Kansas City Chiefs
- 1979: Hamilton Tiger-Cats
- 1980–1982: Toronto Argonauts
- 1982: Edmonton Eskimos
- 1983–1985: Tampa Bay Bandits
- 1986: Montreal Alouettes
- * Offseason or practice squad member only

Awards and highlights
- 2× CFL East All-Star (1980, 1981); First-team All-Pac-8 (1967); 2× All-American (1967, 1969)

Career CFL statistics
- Field goals: 215/365 (58.9%)
- Longest FG: 57
- Kickoffs: 501 (Avg: 57.3 yards)
- Longest kickoff: 90
- Punting: 1,320 (Avg: 45.1 yards)
- Longest punt: 108
- Stats at Pro Football Reference

Zenon Andrusyshyn (Ukrainian: Зенон Андрусишин; /ɑːndruˈsɪʃɪn/ ahn-droo-SIH-shin; February 25, 1947 – August 7, 2023), nicknamed Big Z, was a German-born Canadian punter and kicker in the Canadian Football League (CFL) from 1971–1977 and 1979–1982, primarily for the Toronto Argonauts. He also was a member of the Kansas City Chiefs in the National Football League (NFL) and the Tampa Bay Bandits in the United States Football League (USFL). He played college football at UCLA.

== Early life ==
Zenon Andrusyshyn was born in postwar Bavaria to Ukrainian parents. His family moved to Ontario, Canada where he attended Oakville Trafalgar High School. He set a high school javelin record that lasted for 35 years. Andrusyshyn participated with the Canadian team in the javelin throw, shot put and discus during the 1966 British Empire and Commonwealth Games. He held the Canadian javelin record with a throw of 242 feet 6 inches.

Andrusyshyn received a track and field scholarship from UCLA to compete in the javelin throw, but suffered an elbow injury while preparing for the 1968 Summer Olympics and decided to walk-on to the football team after kicking in a tryout 14 field goals in a row from 45 yards out. In one practice he kicked field goals of 57 and 62 yards. Andrusyshyn was used both as a punter and placekicker.

As a sophomore, he led the NCAA in punting with a 44.2 average and also made 11 of 24 field goal attempts. Against the University of Southern California in a contest that was called "the game of the century", he missed one field goal, had two blocked, and failed a critical extra point that gave USC the victory and the eventual 1967 national championship. Then USC head coach John McKay, remarked that Andrusyshyn had a low trajectory on his kicks and that is why he employed 6-foot-8 offensive tackle Bill Hayhoe to affect his kicking game. As a senior, he made 8 of 12 field goals, 33 of 44 extra points and had a 42.1-yard punting average. He was a two-time All-American punter (1967, 1969) and was voted to UCLA's All Century Team.

== Professional career ==
=== Dallas Cowboys ===
Andrusyshyn was selected by the Dallas Cowboys in the ninth round (231st overall) of the 1970 NFL draft. He was waived before the start of the season on September 2.

=== Toronto Argonauts (first stint) ===
On May 5, 1971, he signed as a free agent with the Toronto Argonauts of the Canadian Football League. On October 23, 1977, he recorded a 108-yard punt against the Edmonton Eskimos, which still stands as the longest punt in professional football history.

=== Kansas City Chiefs ===
On April 14, 1978, he signed as a free agent with the Kansas City Chiefs. He was named the team's starting punter, registering 79 punts for 3,247 yards (41.1-yard avg.), a long of 61 yards and one blocked punt. On August 21, 1979, he was waived after being passed on the depth chart by Bob Grupp.

=== Hamilton Tiger-Cats ===
On September 7, 1979, he was signed as a free agent by the Hamilton Tiger-Cats of the Canadian Football League. He appeared in the last 8 games handling both the punting and kicking roles. He made 10 of 20 field goals, 15 of 16 extra points and averaged 43.2 yards on 51 punts. On June 15, 1980, he was traded to the Toronto Argonauts in exchange for offensive lineman Al MacLean.

=== Toronto Argonauts (second stint) ===
In 1980, he was named the starting kicker and punter over Ian Sunter. He was named CFL East All-Star in two straight seasons. On September 14, 1980, against the Saskatchewan Roughriders, he kicked a career-longest 57-yard field goal. He was passed on the depth chart by Dean Dorsey and was released in September 1982.

=== Edmonton Eskimos ===
In September 1982, he was claimed off waivers by the Edmonton Eskimos to replace Hank Ilesic, unavailable due to a contract dispute.

=== Tampa Bay Bandits ===
On December 29, 1982, he signed as a free agent with the Tampa Bay Bandits of the United States Football League. He was the starter at kicker and punter for three seasons until the team folded in 1986.

=== Montreal Alouettes ===
On October 1, 1986, he signed as a free agent with the Montreal Alouettes to replace an injured Roy Kurtz. He was not re-signed after the season.

== Personal life and death ==
In 1969, Andrusyshyn met his wife on the television show The Dating Game. That year, he also had a small part in the television show Medical Center.

Andrusyshyn was ordained a minister in the Southern Baptist denomination in 1990 in Nashville, Tennessee. He also graduated from Dallas Theological Seminary in 1995 with a Master in Arts, Biblical Studies (MABS).

Andrusyshyn was the Fellowship of Christian Athletes Tampa Area Director from March 1987, completing 20 years with FCA in 2007. In October 2007, Zenon Andrusyshyn formed his own ministry with his wife Sue. Known as Zenon Ministries Inc., it is a 501(c)(3) non-profit youth ministry. Andrusyshyn has been on over 15 mission trips which include delivering medical supplies to the Guna people of Panama (three times), to Cancer Hospitals for Children in Kyiv and Odesa, Ukraine (four times), Missions abroad in England (three times), Germany (three times) and Mexico (three times). He served as Youth Chairman for the Billy Graham Crusade-1998 Tampa, Florida, and as Youth Chairman for Luis Palau's TampaBayFest 2007.

Zenon Andrusyshyn died on August 7, 2023, at the age of 76.
