= Gary Beban =

American football player (born 1946)

No. 16
- Position: Quarterback

Personal information
- Born: August 5, 1946 (age 80); San Francisco, California, U.S.
- Listed height: 6 ft 1 in (1.85 m)
- Listed weight: 195 lb (88 kg)

Career information
- High school: Sequoia (Redwood City, California)
- College: UCLA (1965–1967)
- NFL draft: 1968: 2nd round, 30th overall pick

Career history
- Washington Redskins (1968–1969); Denver Broncos (1971)*
- * Offseason or practice squad member only

Awards and highlights
- Heisman Trophy (1967); Unanimous All-American (1967); Second-team All-American (1965); 3× First-team All-Pac-8 (1965–1967); UCLA Bruins No. 16 retired

Career NFL statistics
- Games played: 5
- Rushing yards: 18
- Stats at Pro Football Reference
- College Football Hall of Fame

Gary Joseph Beban (born August 5, 1946) is an American former professional football player who was a quarterback for two seasons with the Washington Redskins of the National Football League (NFL). He played college football for the UCLA Bruins, winning both the Maxwell Award and the Heisman Trophy in 1967. He was inducted into the College Football Hall of Fame in 1988.

== Early life ==
The son of an Italian-born mother and a first-generation Croatian-American father, Beban graduated from Sequoia High School in Redwood City, California.

== College career ==
Beban, known as "The Great One", excelled in both academics and athletics, majoring in European history while quarterbacking the Bruins across three straight winning seasons. As a quarterback at the University of California, Los Angeles, he was named to the all-conference team three times, and led the Bruins to a 24–5–2 record. His school record for total offense lasted for 15 years. As a sophomore, he threw two touchdown passes in the last four minutes to rally the Bruins over their crosstown arch-rival, USC, 20–16. In the 1966 Rose Bowl, Beban scored both UCLA's touchdowns in the Bruins' 14–12 victory over No. 1 ranked Michigan State.

In his senior year, Beban played in the 1967 USC vs. UCLA football game, widely regarded as one of the best college football games of all time. The game pitted No. 4 AP (No. 2 UPI) ranked USC, and their Heisman Trophy candidate running back O. J. Simpson, against the No. 1 ranked Bruins and Beban—also a Heisman Trophy candidate—with both the AAWU and national championships on the line. Badly injured with torn rib cartilage and in great pain, he still threw for over 300 yards and two touchdowns. Although USC eventually won the game 21–20 on a blocked PAT, and went on to the Rose Bowl, Beban would go on to win the Heisman Trophy. Both Beban and Simpson were featured on the cover of the November 20 issue of Sports Illustrated magazine. Commenting on Beban's heroic effort playing through injury, famed L.A. Times columnist Jim Murray wrote that if "Gary Beban wins the Heisman Trophy, they ought to fill it with aspirin".

In addition to winning the Heisman, Beban was unanimously named to the All-America Team, won the Maxwell Award, and was awarded the Washington Touchdown Club Trophy and the W. J. Voit Memorial Trophy as the outstanding football player on the Pacific Coast. He was also named a National Football Foundation Scholar-Athlete and received the Dolly Cohen award, given to the player best combining academic and football achievement.

UCLA became the first school to have a player of the year winner in both basketball and football in the same year, with Beban winning the Heisman Trophy and Lew Alcindor winning the U.S. Basketball Writers Association player of the year award in 1968. For one week in November 1967, UCLA had the No. 1 ranked football and men's basketball teams, with the chance of landing national championships in both sports. UCLA did ultimately garner the 1968 basketball championship.

Beban was inducted into the Rose Bowl Hall of Fame in 1991. He is a charter member of the UCLA Athletics Hall of Fame, and the Bruins retired his No. 16 jersey. Although the UCLA football program has turned out a high proportion of successful professional players through the years, Beban remains the only Bruin to win the Heisman.

== Professional career ==
After graduating from UCLA, Beban was selected by the Los Angeles Rams in the second round (30th overall) of the 1968 NFL/AFL draft. He was the third quarterback taken, after Greg Landry and Eldridge Dickey, ahead of Mike Livingston and Ken Stabler.

His draft rights were traded to the Washington Redskins on June 14, 1968, after failing to agree to terms on a contract with the Rams, in exchange for a first-round draft pick in 1969 (the Rams used the pick, tenth overall, to select split end Jim Seymour). Beban signed a reported three-year contract worth $200,000 three days later. He played for the Redskins in 1968 and 1969, under new head coach Vince Lombardi. But, sitting behind veteran quarterback and future Hall of Famer Sonny Jurgensen, Beban was given little game time, and the professional stardom portended by his college career was not forthcoming. Released from the Redskins on September 8, 1970, Beban signed with the Denver Broncos after the 1970 season, but was waived on August 5, 1971, and retired from professional football afterwards.

== Awards and honors ==
- Heisman Trophy (1967)
- Maxwell Award (1967)
- SN Player of the Year (1967)
- Chic Harley Award (1967)
- Pop Warner Trophy (1967)
- Unanimous All-American (1967)
- Second-team All-American (1965)
- 3× First-team All-Pac-8 (1965–1967)
- UCLA Bruins No. 16 retired

== Later life ==
In 1971, Beban joined the Los Angeles office of CB Richard Ellis, a global real estate services company. Beginning in 1975, he worked to establish offices in the Chicago area. He was named president and general manager of the company in 1985, and in 1998 became senior executive managing director of the company's Global Corporate Services unit. For several years in the 1970s, he also provided unique color commentary for UCLA football telecasts.

In 2009, UCLA scheduled a special "Throwback Jersey" day in Beban's honor for the UCLA-Washington homecoming game at the Rose Bowl, where the team dressed in the powder-blue and white shoulder-stripe jerseys with pure gold helmets (without decals) of UCLA's 1965–66–67 seasons, uniforms first devised by the coach Red Sanders for his teams of the 1950s, including the 1954 National Championship team. Fans were able to purchase Beban's number 16 jersey to wear en masse that day.
