= Tim Rossovich =

American football player and actor (1946–2018)

No. 82, 88, 58
- Positions: Linebacker, Defensive end

Personal information
- Born: March 14, 1946; Palo Alto, California, U.S.
- Died: December 6, 2018 (aged 72); Grass Valley, California, U.S.
- Listed height: 6 ft 4 in (1.93 m)
- Listed weight: 240 lb (109 kg)

Career information
- High school: Saint Francis (Mountain View, California)
- College: USC (1964–1967)
- NFL draft: 1968: 1st round, 14th overall pick

Career history
- Philadelphia Eagles (1968–1971); San Diego Chargers (1972–1973); Philadelphia Bell (1974–1975); Houston Oilers (1976)

Awards and highlights
- Pro Bowl (1969); National champion (1967); Consensus All-American (1967); 2× First-team All-Pac-8 (1965, 1967); Second-team All-Pac-8 (1966)

Career NFL statistics
- Fumble recoveries: 10
- Interceptions: 3
- Sacks: 14.5
- Stats at Pro Football Reference

Timothy John Rossovich (March 14, 1946 – December 6, 2018) was an American professional football linebacker and a television and movie actor, active from 1977 to 1998. He was the brother of actor Rick Rossovich.

== Biography ==
Rossovich was born in Palo Alto, California. Tim is ranked 20th on the list of "greatest high school defensive football players of all time". After graduating high school, he turned down a pitching position with the Pittsburgh Pirates because he wanted to play in the NFL one day. He played college football at the University of Southern California and was one of five USC Trojans players taken in the first round of the 1968 NFL/AFL draft after his senior year. Rossovich played for the National Football League Philadelphia Eagles, San Diego Chargers, and Houston Oilers between 1968 and 1976. He played in the Pro Bowl in 1969.

In March 1974, he was selected by the Philadelphia Bell in the first round (third overall) of the 1974 WFL pro draft. He opted to sign with the Philadelphia Bell of the World Football League, where he played until the league folded midway through the 1975 season.

In 1977, Rossovich appeared in the episode "The Shortest Yard" of the ABC situation comedy The San Pedro Beach Bums. He played Detective Noodles in the Cheech and Chong 1981 comedy Nice Dreams alongside Peter Jason. He also appeared in the 1982 movie Night Shift as one of Shelley Long's prostitute character's johns. The movie also starred Henry Winkler and Michael Keaton.

Rossovich died due to respiratory arrest on December 6, 2018, in Grass Valley, California.

== Filmography ==
Year	Title	Role	Notes
1978	Charlie's Angels	Taylor	
1979	Charlie's Angels	Terrence	
1979	The Main Event	Cannibal	
1980	The Ninth Configuration	Biker	Uncredited
1980	The Long Riders	Pitts	
1981	Nice Dreams	Detective Noodles	
1981	Looker	Moustache Man	
1982	Knight Rider	Butch	"The Final Verdict"
1982	Night Shift	Luke	
1982	Fake-Out	Hit Man #1	
1982	Hart to Hart	Larry	
1983	Hart to Hart	Jack Burke	
1983	The A-Team	Milt / Boyle	
1983	The Sting II	'Typhoon' Taylor	
1984	Cloak & Dagger	Haverman	
1984	Knight Rider	Bloodworth	"Knights of the Fast Lane"
1985	Avenging Angel	Teddy Butts	
1985	Stick	Cecil	
1986	MacGyver	Political prisoner	Season 1 Episode 21 "Prisoner of Conscience"
1988	Johnny Be Good	Gas Attendant	
1988	Magnum P.I.	Hank	Season 8 Episode 13 "Resolutions, Part 2"
1990	Secret Agent OO Soul	Tall Man	
1990	MacGyver	Novis Reilly	Season 6 Episode 11 "Squeeze Play"
1991	Fists of Steel	Captain Jokish	
1991	Baywatch	Larry Veron	Season 2 Episode 12 "Reunion"
