= Adrian Young (American football) =

American football player (born 1946)

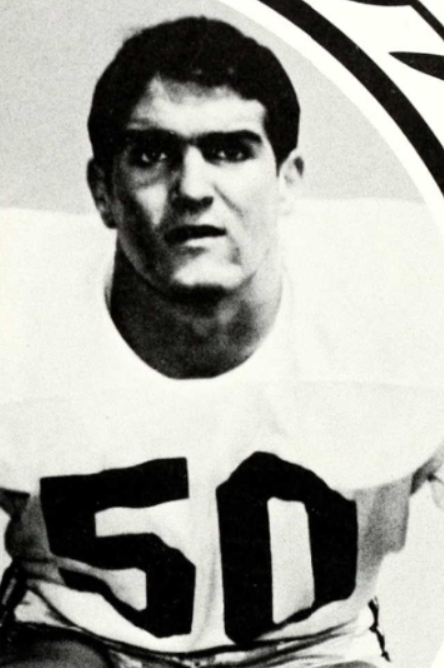
- Young from 1968 USC yearbook

No. 35, 51, 54, 61, 65
- Position: Linebacker

Personal information
- Born: January 31, 1946 (age 80); Dublin, Ireland
- Listed height: 6 ft 1 in (1.85 m)
- Listed weight: 232 lb (105 kg)

Career information
- High school: Bishop Amat Memorial (La Puente, California, U.S.)
- College: USC (1964-1967)
- NFL draft: 1968: 3rd round, 68th overall pick

Career history

Playing
- Philadelphia Eagles (1968–1972); Detroit Lions (1972); Chicago Bears (1973); The Hawaiians (1974–1975)

Coaching
- The Hawaiians (1975) Linebackers coach

Awards and highlights
- Consensus All-American (1967); Second-team All-American (1966); 2× First-team All-Pac-8 (1966, 1967)

Career NFL statistics
- Fumble recoveries: 4
- Interceptions: 3
- Stats at Pro Football Reference

Matthew Adrian Young Jr. (born January 31, 1946) is a former American football linebacker who played six seasons in the National Football League (NFL). Young played college football for the University of Southern California (USC), and earned All-American honors. The Philadelphia Eagles chose him in the third round of the 1968 NFL/AFL draft, and he played professionally for the Eagles, Detroit Lions and Chicago Bears.

== Early life ==
Young was born in Dublin, Ireland. He attended Bishop Amat Memorial High School in La Puente, California, and played high school football for the Amat Lancers.

== College career ==
Young enrolled in the University of Southern California, where he played for the USC Trojans football team from 1965 to 1967. Following his 1967 senior season, he was recognized as a consensus first-team All-American.

== Professional career ==
He was drafted by the Philadelphia Eagles in the third round, 68th overall pick, of the 1968 NFL Draft. He played for the Eagles for five seasons from 1968 to 1972. He played part of the 1972 NFL season for the Detroit Lions, and played his last NFL season for the Chicago Bears in 1973. During his six NFL seasons, he appeared in 52 regular season games, and started 24 of them.

He was also a member of The Hawaiians of the World Football League (WFL) in 1974.
