= Hot Pants =

Hotpants or hot pants are an item of clothing

Hot Pants can also refer to:

- "Hot Pants" (James Brown song)
- "Hot Pants" (Gene Summers song)
- Hot Pants Patrol, a promotional group for the Philadelphia Phillies
- Hot Pants (band), a French band formed by singer Manu Chao prior to the establishment of Mano Negra
- Hot Pants (album)
- Hot Pants Explosion, a song on the B-52s album Good Stuff
- Hot Pants, a side character in Hirohiko Araki's manga series Steel Ball Run
- "Hot Pants", a storyline in the science fiction comedy webtoon series Live with Yourself!
