= Gym shorts =

Clothing worn by people when exercising

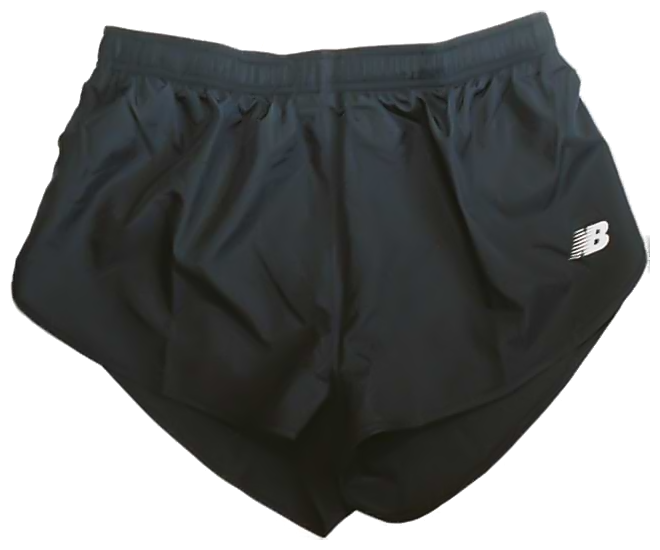
A pair of black running shorts

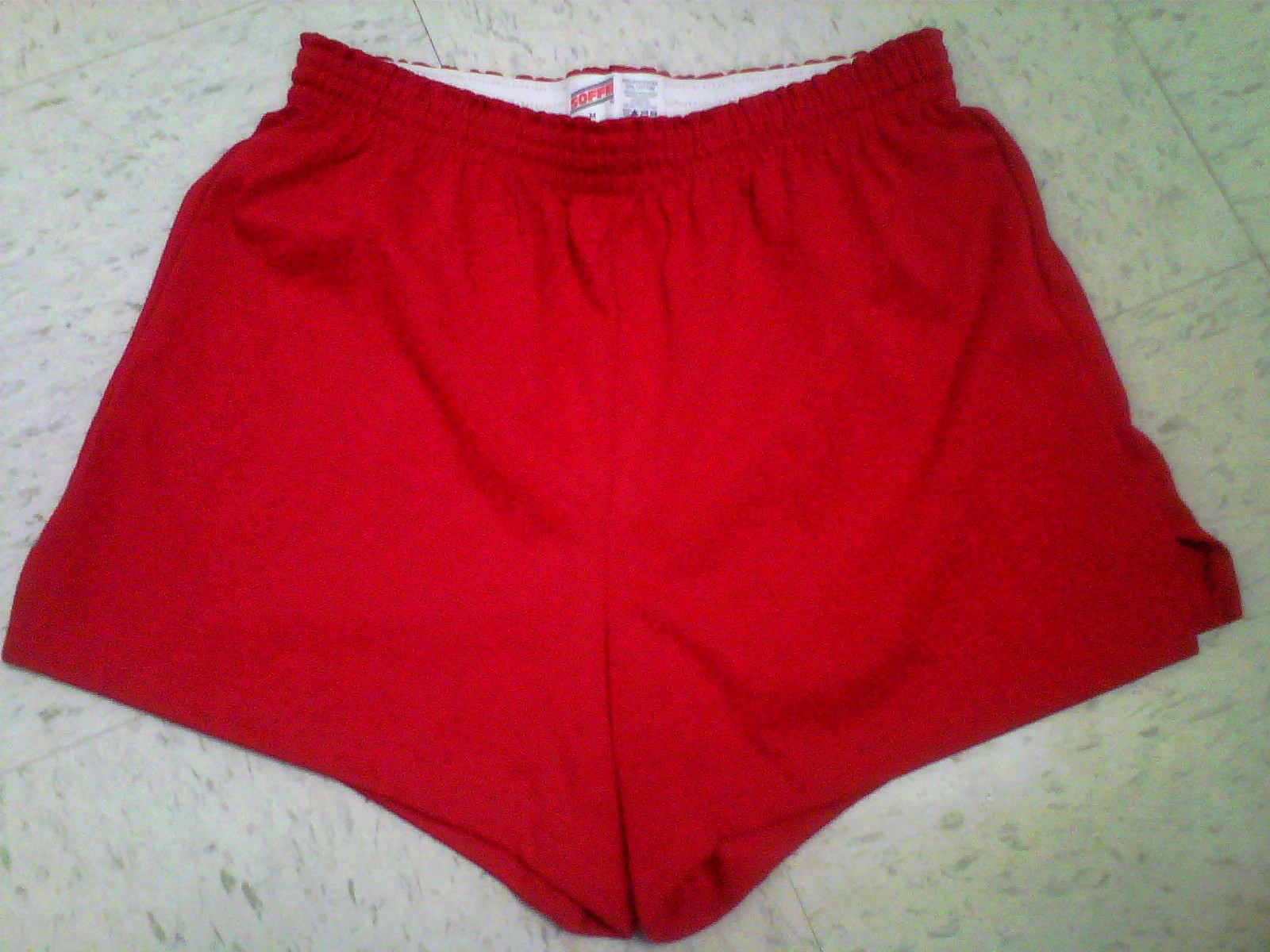
Soffe gym shorts

Gym shorts are an article of clothing typically worn by people when exercising. They are typically made out of fabrics that allow for maximum comfort and ease, such as nylon. Brands such as Nike, Under Armour, Gymshark, Adidas, and Reebok all make gym shorts. Cotton gym shorts were made popular by a cheerleading brand called Soffe.

While gym shorts were traditionally worn by men, from the late 1970s and onward, women began wearing them for better comfort at the gym as well as a modern fashion trend.

Running shorts are a specialized form of shorts worn by runners. Often the cut of a running short is quite short, done in order to maximise breathability and movement.

== Changes from short to baggy ==
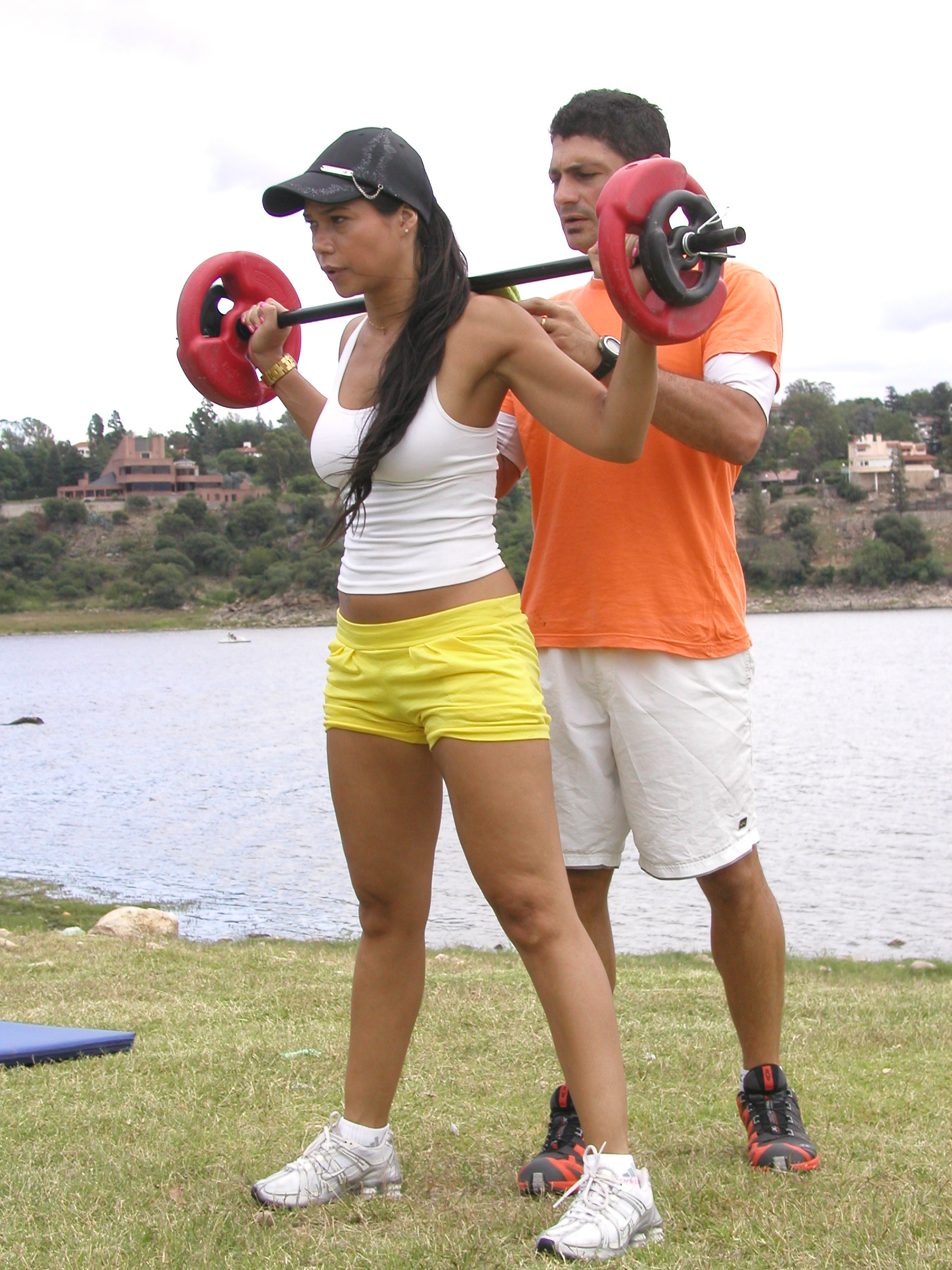
Gym shorts worn by a woman while exercising outdoors.

Up until around 1993, men's gym shorts were typically very short.

The first time today's baggy or "bermuda" look was publicized was when Michael Jordan wore baggy shorts in the Nike commercial with Spike Lee in 1988. Another basketball team who emphasized today's men modern style, who were inspired by Michael Jordan, was the Fab 5 Wolverines, who included Juwan Howard, Chris Webber, and Jalen Rose. After that, the look spread into other NBA and other sports. The look quickly expanded into mainstream American culture, and baggy shorts soon replaced upper-thigh shorts outside the sportsworld.

Even as the short shorts became scarce in the NBA, John Stockton of the Utah Jazz continued to wear them until his retirement in 2003. Also, during a hardwood classics night on December 31, 2007, the Los Angeles Lakers wore the short shorts against their 1980s rival, the Boston Celtics.

== Today ==
Nowadays, gym shorts are often worn as daily casual wear outside of exercise, particularly by youth. While some boys prefer shorts that reach the calf, most wear shorts that stop at the knee or just above, propagating the style as fashion. The appeal of these knee length shorts as warm weather wear is diminishing as most adults find the added length of cloth restrictive and counterproductive in truly active or competitive sports. A modern example of this departure was evident during the 2012 Olympics when the USA men's volleyball team opted for the more athletic-friendly thigh length. The international volleyball federation now requires men's shorts to have an inseam of at most 10 centimeters (3.9 inches). Shorter cut gym shorts appear to be slowly returning to popularity for those that favor function over fashion.

Many gym shorts have an inlay made of a comfortable fabric such as cotton, similar to swim shorts. These are designed to be worn without underwear. The pre-1990s short shorts remain the standard for men in running activities. Originally, gym shorts were worn by boys and men along with a jockstrap only underneath. Schools across the country required boys to wear a jock, also known as an athletic supporter, for all PE/gym activities. This provided protection from testicle torsion, from squishing them between the thighs, and for modesty purposes. Nowadays, many boys and men wear boxer shorts, briefs, boxer briefs, compression shorts, swim briefs or other standard underwear, although jockstraps are now making a comeback.

== Running shorts ==
Running shorts are designed to facilitate comfort and free movement during exercise. Their materials are lightweight and hard-wearing. Many running shorts include an inner lining that acts as underwear, so wearing separate underwear is not necessary. Polyester is a common fabric in running shorts and makes it comfortable.

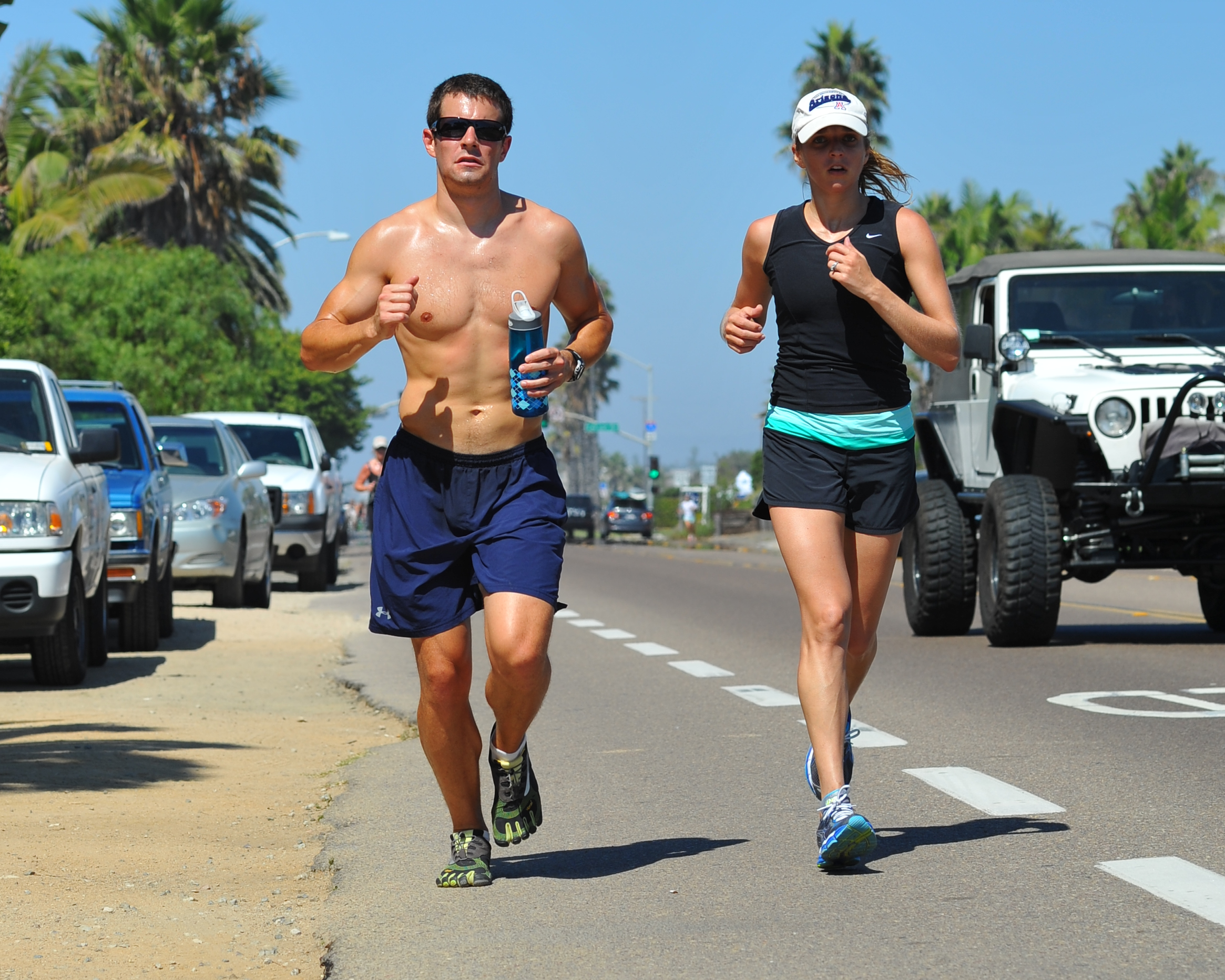
A man and woman in running shorts

Many running shorts have a seam cut up the side of each leg to enable freer movement. Manufacturers define running shorts according to the length of the leg which is not cut. For example, a 3/4 seam means that 1/4 of the length is cut.

- 1/2 split seam shorts are the shortest.
- 3/4 split seam shorts are short, but not as short as 1/2 split seam shorts.
- Square leg shorts have no split at all.

Longer shorts are not ideal for running. A runner's stride may pull up the shorts' fabric, which can cause discomfort. Nonetheless, some runners prefer longer shorts because they cover a greater portion of their legs.

Some runners use athletic hot pants as running shorts. Like 1/2 split seam shorts, hot pants do not encumber leg movement.

Lycra running shorts are an alternative to conventional, polyester-based shorts. In most cases, they reach the mid-thigh. They are skin-tight, so they allow for more flexible, unencumbered movement.

== See also ==
- Athleisure
- Hot pants
- Spandex
- Sports bra
- Sportswear
- Yoga pants
