= Dolphin shorts =

Style of athletic shorts

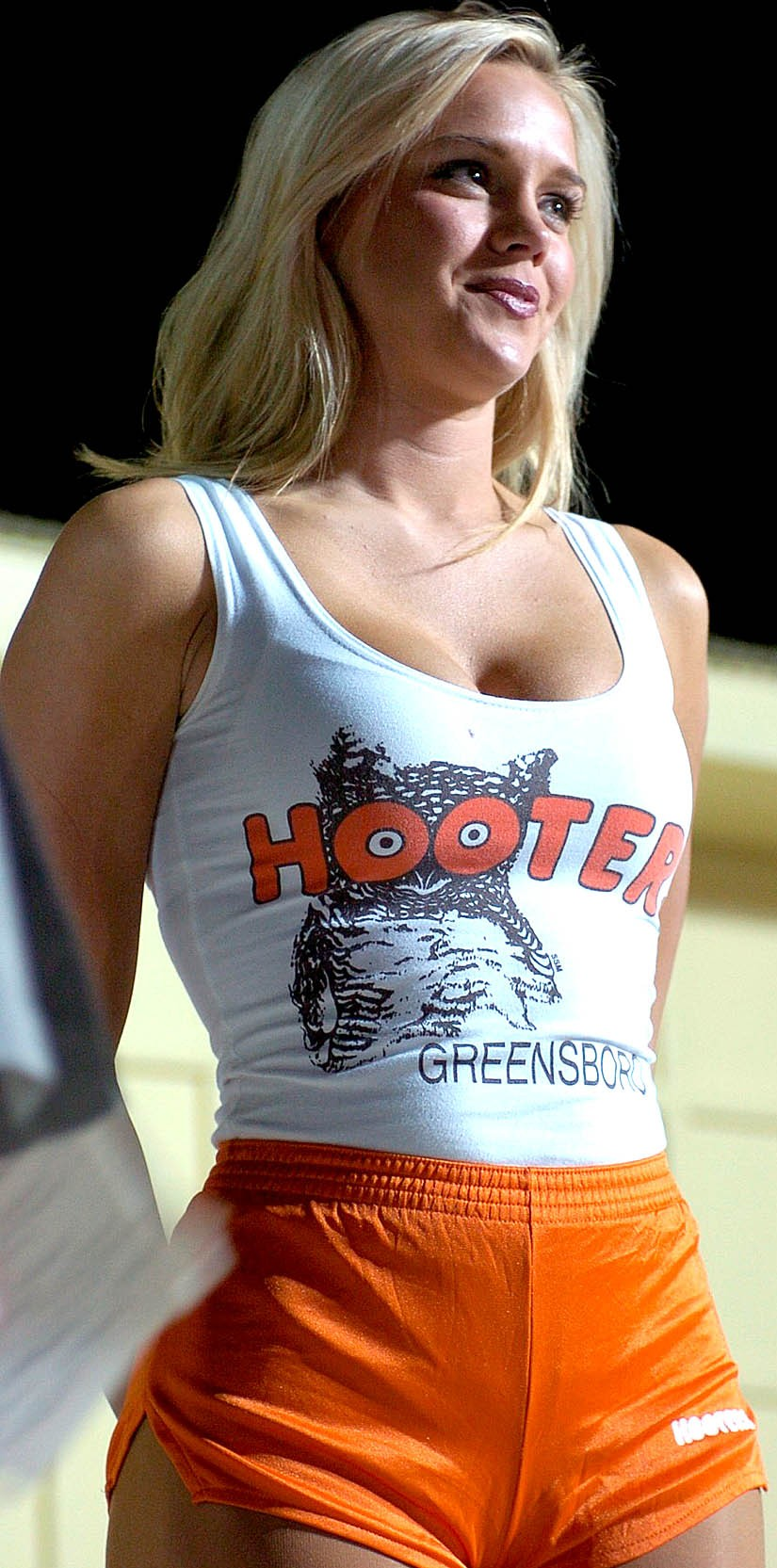
- Melissa Poe, a Hooters waitress, wearing orange Dolphin shorts
- Type: Athletic shorts for men or women
- Material: Fabric
- Manufacturer: Dolfin

Dolphin shorts or Dolfins are a style of unisex shorts designed to be worn for athletics.

== Descriptions ==
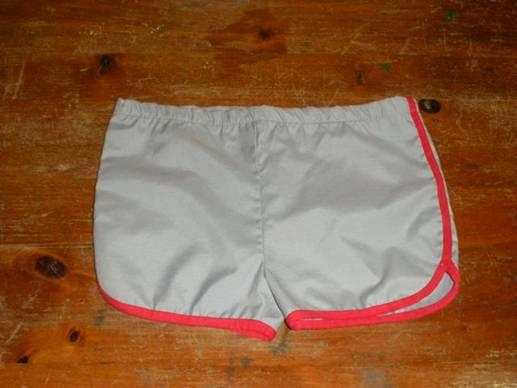
A white and pink pair of dolphin shorts.

Dolphin shorts are a style of unisex shorts designed to be worn for athletics. They are typically very short and were originally made from nylon with contrasting binding, side slits, and rounded corners, with a waistband at the top—a style popular in the 1980s.

== History ==
The name is from Dolfin, the American company that first produced this style of shorts in the 1980s.

== Popular culture ==
- Due to their shortness, they are considered a form of hotpants.
- One high-profile wearer of dolphin shorts was Richard Simmons, who boasted of owning 400 pairs of vintage Dolfins in 2012.
- As of 2012, Orange Dolfin shorts are specified as part of the uniform for waitresses at Hooters restaurants.

== See also ==
- Running shorts
