= Bill Bradley (gridiron football) =

American gridiron football player and coach (born 1947)

- Bradley in 1972

No. 28, 30
- Positions: Safety, punter, return specialist

Personal information
- Born: January 24, 1947 (age 79); Palestine, Texas, U.S.
- Listed height: 5 ft 11 in (1.80 m)
- Listed weight: 190 lb (86 kg)

Career information
- High school: Palestine
- College: Texas (1965–1968)
- NFL draft: 1969: 3rd round, 69th overall pick

Career history

Playing
- Philadelphia Eagles (1969–1976); Minnesota Vikings (1977); St. Louis Cardinals (1977)

Coaching
- San Antonio Bulls / Gunslingers (1983–1984) Assistant coach & quality control; Memphis Showboats (1985) Assistant coach; Texas (1987) Volunteer assistant; Calgary Stampeders (1988–1990) Defensive coordinator; San Antonio Riders (1991–1992) Defensive backs coach; San Antonio Texans (1993–1994) Defensive coordinator; Sacramento Gold Miners (1994–1995) Defensive coordinator; Toronto Argonauts (1996–1997) Defensive coordinator; Buffalo Bills (1998–2000) Defensive backs coach; New York Jets (2001–2003) Defensive backs coach; Baylor (2004–2006) Defensive coordinator; San Diego Chargers (2007–2008) Defensive backs coach; Florida Tuskers (2009–2010) Defensive backs coach; Lamar (2012–2014) Defensive coordinator; San Antonio Commanders (2019) Defensive backs coach

Awards and highlights
- As a player: 2× First-team All-Pro (1971, 1972); 3× Pro Bowl (1971–1973); 2× NFL interceptions Leader (1971, 1972); Philadelphia Eagles Hall of Fame; As a coach: 2× Grey Cup champion (1996, 1997)

Career NFL statistics
- Games played: 114
- Starts: 80
- Interceptions: 34
- Fumble recoveries: 9
- Punts: 213
- Punting yards: 8,316 (39.0 average)
- Return yards: 1,517
- Touchdowns: 1
- Stats at Pro Football Reference

William Calvin Bradley (born January 24, 1947) is an American former football player and coach. He played professionally as a safety, punter and return specialist in the National Football League (NFL), earning All-Pro honors twice. He played with the Philadelphia Eagles for most of his career. As an assistant coach he won two Grey Cups in the Canadian Football League (CFL). He was also the defensive backs coach of the San Antonio Commanders of the Alliance of American Football.

== Early life ==
A native of Palestine, Texas, Bradley was a quarterback at Palestine High School. With Bradley as quarterback, Palestine won the 1964 Texas 3A State Championship, the only one in the school's history. His running and passing skills gained him selection as a high school All-American. His football talents, including the reputed ability to pass with either hand, earned him the nickname "Super Bill." He also participated in the Big 33 football game for the Texas All-Stars in 1966.

His father was a baseball coach and Bradley dreamed of playing professional baseball. He was a talented shortstop who was selected by the Detroit Tigers in the 7th Round of the 1965 Major League Baseball draft. He was offered $20,000 to sign, but turned it down because he wanted to go to college. Instead, he played semi-pro ball with the Palestine Pals.

== College career ==
Bradley entered the University of Texas at Austin in 1965 and became the starting quarterback and punter in 1966 as a sophomore.

In 1966, he led the Longhorns to a 7–4 record and a victory over Mississippi in the Bluebonnet Bowl. Injured during a win over Indiana, he sat out the Oklahoma game in favor of back-up Andy White, and Oklahoma notched its first win in the rivalry since 1957. Bradley came back the following week and finished the season as the Southwest Conference's leader for rushing touchdowns with 6. In the Bluebonnet Bowl, Bradley and running back Chris Gilbert each ran for over 100 yards, marking the first time that two Longhorns had run for over 100 yards in the same bowl game.

Bradley was starting quarterback again the next season. Texas started the season ranked #5, but back-to-back losses to #4 USC and Texas Tech knocked them from the rankings. They then ran off 6 straight wins before ending the season with another pair of back-to-back losses, this time to TCU and Texas A&M to finish 6-4 and missing out on a bowl game. Despite the down year, Bradley led the Southwest Conference in total touchdowns with 14.

In 1968, Texas started the season ranked #5 and introduced the wishbone formation on offense, with co-captain Bradley at quarterback. Struggling with the new offense, Texas with Bradley under center tied #11 Houston and lost to Texas Tech. James Street replaced Bradley during the 3rd quarter of the Texas Tech game and never relinquished the position, leading the Longhorns to 9 consecutive wins, a Southwest Conference Championship and victory in the Cotton Bowl. Bradley was moved to wide receiver for two weeks, and then to defensive back and kick-off returner. As a defensive back he set the Texas and Southwest Conference records for most interceptions in a game when he picked off Texas A&M four times at the end of the regular season. His final game as a Longhorn was the 36–13 win over Tennessee in the Cotton Bowl. He then played in the 1969 Hula Bowl, the Coaches All-America Game and the College All-Star Game.

=== Records ===
- UT – Most passing yards, game (220 yards), broke his own record set earlier that year, surpassed by Rick McIvor in 1979
- **UT – Longest punt, bowl game (74 yards)**
- UT – Most Offensive Yards, season (1,624), surpassed by Earl Campbell in 1977
- **Southwest Conference and UT – Most interceptions caught, game (4)**

Bold means still active

== NFL career ==
Bradley was selected in the third round of the 1969 NFL/AFL draft by the Philadelphia Eagles as a punter/defensive back. His first season he punted and returned kick-offs and punts. The next season, he was just the punter. In 1971, he finally moved to defense, became the back-up punter and was a returner again. It was on defense that he stood out. He went on to earn three All-Pro selections (1971–73) at free safety, including first-team All-Pro in 1971 and 1972. He also played in three Pro Bowls from 1971 to 1973. His last full season of punting was 1972. He continued returning kick-offs and punts off and on for the rest of his career. Bradley led the NFL in interceptions in both 1971 (11) and 1972 (9), the first player ever to lead the league in interceptions in consecutive seasons, a feat matched only once since. In 1971, he also led the NFL in yards after an interception with 248. These achievements did not draw widespread attention, though, as the Eagles' record for those 2 years was 6–7–1 and 2–11–1; and the Eagles never made the playoffs during Bradley's tenure. He played his final year as the Eagle free safety in 1976, replaced by John Sanders.

Bradley would later recount that during his years with the Eagles, he would spend nights out on dates with members of the Philadelphia Phillies usherettes.

In 1977, Philadelphia traded Bradley to the Minnesota Vikings for a 7th round draft pick, but the Vikings cut him in training camp in favor of Paul Krause. Bradley went into retirement, working in his family's restaurant in Palestine, but in November of that year he was signed by the St. Louis Cardinals when Mike Sensibaugh broke his leg. He had been asked to come back by other teams – including Houston, Oakland and Pittsburgh, but only accepted with St. Louis because they looked to be playoff-bound. But they lost all their remaining games that season and stayed home. Bradley played four games as a defensive back with the Cardinals and then retired for good.

Bradley is a member of the Texas High School, University of Texas, Philadelphia Eagles and Texas Sports Halls of Fame.

=== Records ===
- Eagles – Interceptions, season (11)
- Eagles – Interceptions, career (34), tied by Brian Dawkins and Eric Allen
- Eagles – Interception return yards, season (249)
- Eagles – Interception return yards, career (536)

== Coaching career ==
After retiring from the NFL, Bradley worked an assortment of jobs. He had invested in a sports management company based in Philadelphia, but sold his shares in 1980 and went back to Palestine where he bought a farm and ran a gas station he owned. He also worked as a host on Norwegian Cruise lines in the 1980s and '90s.

Bradley's first coaching assignment was as defensive backs coach for the San Antonio Gunslingers of the fledgling USFL in 1983–1984. From there he moved on to the Memphis Showboats with head coach Pepper Rodgers in 1985. When the USFL folded, Bradley went back to The University of Texas as a voluntary assistant coach in 1987 for new head coach David McWilliams. He was then hired by head coach Wally Buono as the defensive back coach and defensive coordinator for the Calgary Stampeders of the Canadian Football League from 1988 to 1990.

Coach Mike Riley asked Bradley to coach the secondary for him in the World League of American Football (WLAF) as his defensive back coach from 1991 to 1993. Bradley then went back to the CFL and coached with Kay Stephenson for the Sacramento Gold Miners/San Antonio Texans in 1994–1995 as defensive coordinator before moving back to Canada with the Toronto Argonauts. There he helped win two Grey Cups in 1996 and 1997.

Success in Canada gave Bradley his first chance to coach in the NFL. From 1998 to 2000, he served as defensive backs coach for Wade Phillips, Ted Cottrell and the Buffalo Bills before moving to the same position with the New York Jets from 2001 to 2003.

Bradley returned to college coaching when his former Eagle teammate Guy Morriss hired him to be defensive coordinator for 2004–2006 at Baylor University. He then returned to the NFL to reunite with Defensive Coordinator Ted Cottrell as the San Diego Chargers secondary coach from 2006 to 2008. In early 2009, Bradley and three other assistants were fired.

During 2009 and 2010, he was the secondary coach for the Florida Tuskers of the United Football League. Bradley was hired to be the secondary coach of the Hartford Colonials in the UFL but the league pulled the plug on the team for lack of funds before he could coach a game.

In 2012, Bradley was hired by Ray Woodard as the defensive coordinator of the Lamar Cardinals football team. He retired from Lamar, and from coaching, in 2014, in part to help take care of his stepson who had suffered brain trauma as the result of a violent attack.

In 2019, Bradley was the defensive backs coach of the San Antonio Commanders of the AAF until the league went bankrupt.

He came out of retirement to serve as linebackers coach in the 2023 Hula Bowl for Team Kai.
