= Hotpants =

Short, tight shorts

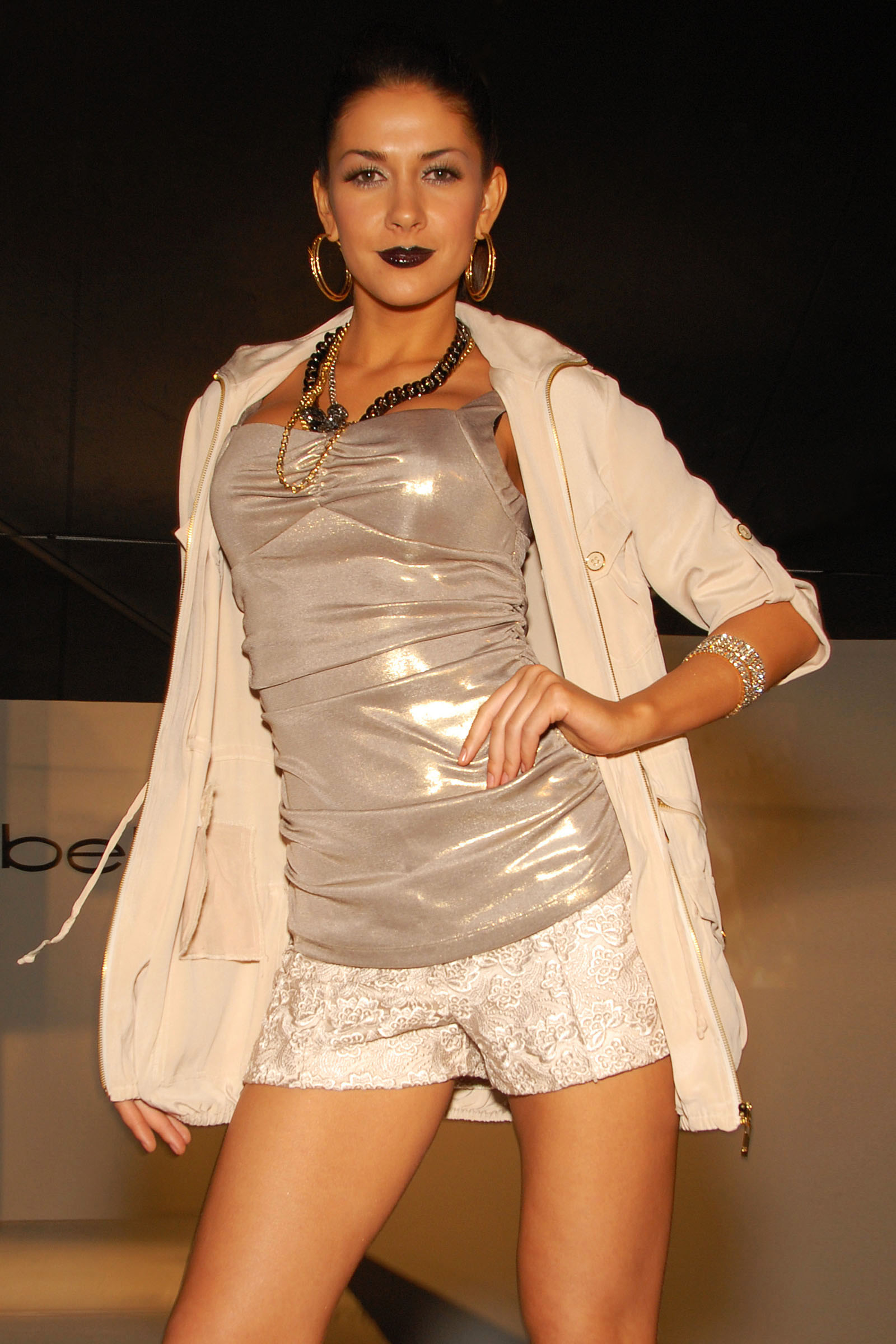
Brocade hotpants modelled by Larysa Poznyak for Bebe, 2008

Hotpants or hot pants are extremely short shorts. The term was first used by Women's Wear Daily in 1970 to describe shorts made in luxury fabrics such as velvet and satin for fashionable wear, rather than their more practical equivalents that had been worn for sports or leisure since the 1930s. Hotpants are worn above the knees around the thigh area. The term has since become a generic term for any pair of extremely short shorts. While hotpants were briefly a very popular element of mainstream fashion in the early 1970s, by the mid-1970s they had become associated with the sex industry, which contributed to their fall from fashion. However, hotpants continued to be popular as clubwear well into the 2010s and 2020s and are often worn within the entertainment industry, particularly as part of cheerleader costumes or for dancers (especially backup dancers). Performers such as Britney Spears and Kylie Minogue have famously worn hotpants as part of their public performances and presentation.

== Origins and terminology ==
While the term "hotpants" is used generically to describe extremely short shorts, similar garments had been worn since the 1930s. Such was their popularity in the 1950s that the Royal Teens' hit song "Short Shorts" paid homage to a similar item. Hotpants were innovative in that they were made from non-activewear fabrics such as velvet, silk, crochet, fur and leather, and styled explicitly to be worn on the street, for parties, or even as bridal wear, as opposed to previous short shorts that were designed mostly for sportswear and leisure. Dorothy Tricario, a fashion curator at the Brooklyn Museum told The New York Times in 1971 that hotpants were part of a greater nostalgic revival of 1930s and 1940s fashion, specifically the short posing shorts worn by Hollywood stars like Ruby Keeler, Deanna Durbin, and Betty Grable. However, Tricario also observed that shorts had never before had such widespread acceptance as street or business wear as they did in early 1971.

According to the fashion publicist Eleanor Lambert, the term "hot pants" was coined by Women's Wear Daily (WWD) in 1970 to describe fashions innovated by the French ready-to-wear company Dorothée Bis. The WWD claim to have originated the term is also backed up by 1971 articles in The New York Times and the African-American magazine Jet. Jet's fashion editor, Audrey Smaltz, suggested that because hotpants were best suited to Black women, they should be called "Knockout Shorts" as that name was more "relevant to Blacks", expressing the fashionable African-American woman's pride in her "knockout body" as well as paying tribute to Black identity and recent struggles. Other alternative names included "les shorts", "short cuts", "cool pants", and "shortootsies", with "booty shorts" as an early 21st-century term.

An extremely short version of denim cut-offs are hotpants popularly known as "Daisy Dukes" in reference to Catherine Bach's character of that name from the American television show The Dukes of Hazzard.

Today, the term hotpants can be used for casual as well as fashion-wear short-shorts made in any fabric.

While hotpants were principally marketed to women, men were also targeted, and the term can describe very short men's shorts.

== Reception ==
At the end of the 1960s, the fashion industry had tried unsuccessfully to promote the mid-calf-length or midi skirt as a fashionable replacement for the miniskirt. In contrast to the lukewarm response to the midi, shoppers enthusiastically embraced the idea of short shorts, which were made available at all price levels from haute couture to inexpensive ready-to-wear. Lambert credits Mariuccia Mandelli of the Italian fashion label Krizia with designing the first "hot pants" in 1970. Hotpants are also increasingly credited to Mary Quant, who offered brief shorts in the late 1960s, although these were intended as modesty knickers to wear with matching minidresses rather than standalone fashion garments. Many designers from across the Western world produced their own versions of hotpants at all price levels, including Yves Saint Laurent, Valentino, Halston, and Betsey Johnson. Mass-produced versions were also sold through the Sears mail-order catalogue.

Hotpants were available for women, men and children, although they were principally worn by women. Jacqueline Kennedy Onassis bought a pair for wear while yachting, while other high-profile wearers included Elizabeth Taylor, Raquel Welch, and Jane Fonda. Hotpants were also worn by particularly adventurous men such as David Bowie, Sammy Davis Jr. and Liberace. Hotpants for men were slightly longer than the women's versions, although they were still shorter than usual.

The James Brown song "Hot Pants (She Got to Use What She Got to Get What She Wants)", released in August 1971, was, according to his trombonist Fred Wesley, inspired by the sight of women of all colours wearing hotpants in a wide range of materials in the Black and White Club, Brussels.

The historian Valerie Steele noted that hotpants, both as a name, and as a garment, quickly became associated with sexuality and prostitution due to their popularity with male spectators. In January 1971, a Manhattan-based male psychiatrist suggested that the popularity of hotpants lay in how they expressed a "female's new freedom", borrowing his phrasing from the women's liberation movement, but then went on to suggest that the wearer of hotpants wanted to relate to other people by drawing attention through "sexually provocative" dressing as a "prelude to a genuine relationship". By the mid-1970s, extremely short shorts had become shorthand for prostitution, particularly underage prostitution, as exemplified by the 1976 film Taxi Driver, in which Jodie Foster's child-prostitute character was dressed in a pair of hotpants. Such associations contributed to hotpants becoming unattractive as a part of a woman's everyday wardrobe, although they remained popular wear in entertainment, party-wear and some evening contexts. The controversial associations with hotpants were still an issue in 1999, when Britney Spears posed for a photoshoot in Rolling Stone wearing a pink pair. The photographs, taken by David LaChapelle, presented Spears in provocative poses, surrounded by dolls and tricycles, with the word "Baby" rhinestoned across the seat of her hotpants, and led to widespread media debate and public commentary about whether it was appropriate for role models for young girls to present themselves in such a "highly sexualised" manner.

In 2000, Kylie Minogue notably wore a pair of gold lamé hotpants in her music video for "Spinning Around", which led to widespread media focus on the garment and the singer's body within. The hotpants were eventually donated by Minogue to the Performing Arts Collection museum at the Arts Centre, Melbourne, where they are described as "one of the most identifiable items of contemporary popular culture." Also that same year, Aida Pierce wore a pair of black hotpants for her first Humor es...Los comediantes sketch, "El ganadero", which also featured fellow comics Carlos Espejel and Teo Gonzalez.

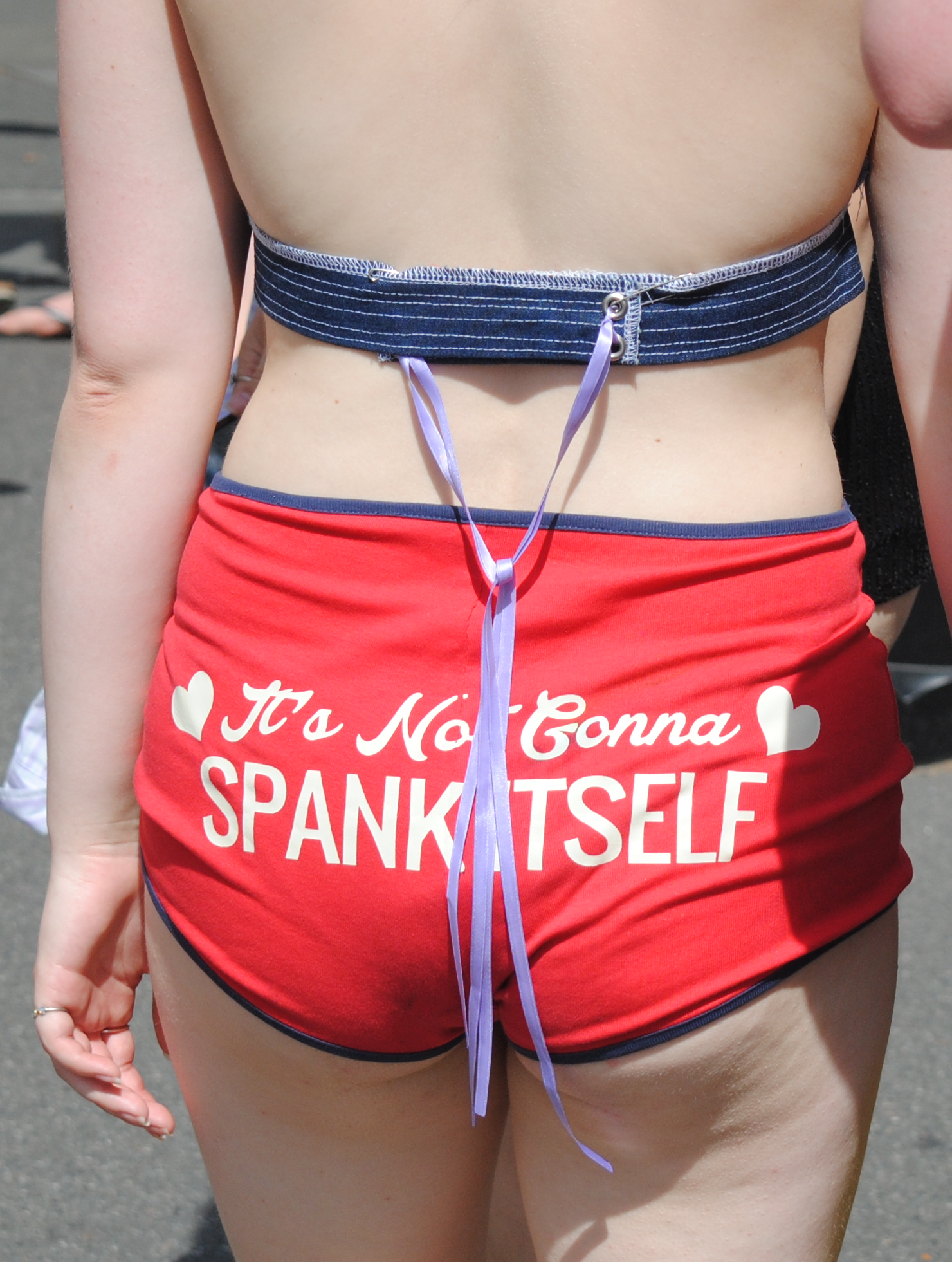
Rear view of a young woman wearing red hotpants, with the words "It's not gonna spank itself" on the seat, at Pride in London 2026

Hotpants, also called booty shorts, continue being popular well into the 2010s, and are often seen in particular contexts such as Miami's South Beach and Venice Beach, Los Angeles, whose beach-to-bar environments have unique dress codes.

== In uniforms ==
Hotpants can also be part of a uniform worn by cheerleaders (as made popular by the Dallas Cowboys Cheerleaders) and performers, or required wear in certain service industries (such as the Hooters restaurant chain).

Southwest Airlines became notorious for the hotpants uniform they supplied for their stewardesses (nicknamed "Love Birds") in 1971, as featured in an ad campaign with the slogan "Someone Else Up There Who Loves You." The tangerine-coloured uniforms (designed by Juanice Gunn Muse, the wife of M. Lamar Muse, the Southwest Airlines president) were worn by girls who were chosen for their good looks and friendliness. Lamar Muse boasted that having beautiful attendants in hotpants ensured that male passengers would fight to sit on the aisle rather than by the window. However, feminist organisations such as Stewardesses for Women's Rights protested and lobbied against the uniform.

Also in 1971, the Hot Pants Patrol was introduced as an elite corps of female ushers for the Philadelphia Phillies baseball team, with the intention of attracting greater audiences for the games. While the majority of "Fillies" wore white microskirts as part of their uniform, the 36 members of the Hot Pants Patrol wore a red hotpants jumpsuit with white vinyl go-go boots. After pressure from feminist organisations, the Phillies retired the Hot Pants Patrol in 1982.

Hotpants or booty shorts remain a popular costume for cheerleaders and dancers, particularly hip hop performers, and are frequently worn by backup dancers. The uniform of the Dallas Cowboys Cheerleaders consists of hotpants and midriff tops. In the early 21st century hotpants continue to be part of certain service industry uniforms, particularly where the wearers are likely to serve a predominantly male clientele. One example of this is Hooters, where the servers (or "Hooters Girls") wear orange dolphin shorts along with a tight tank top, pantyhose and a bra.

Extremely short shorts have also seen use within military use. Unofficially, members of the Rhodesian and South African armed forces wore extremely short shorts due to fighting in the hot climates there. The Austrian Army also used short shorts for PT wear.

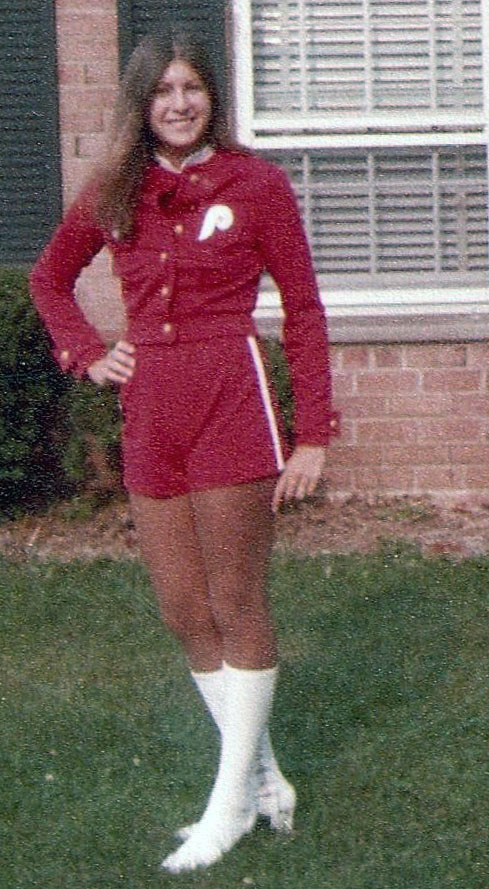
Philadelphia Phillies Hot Pants Patrol uniform, 1975

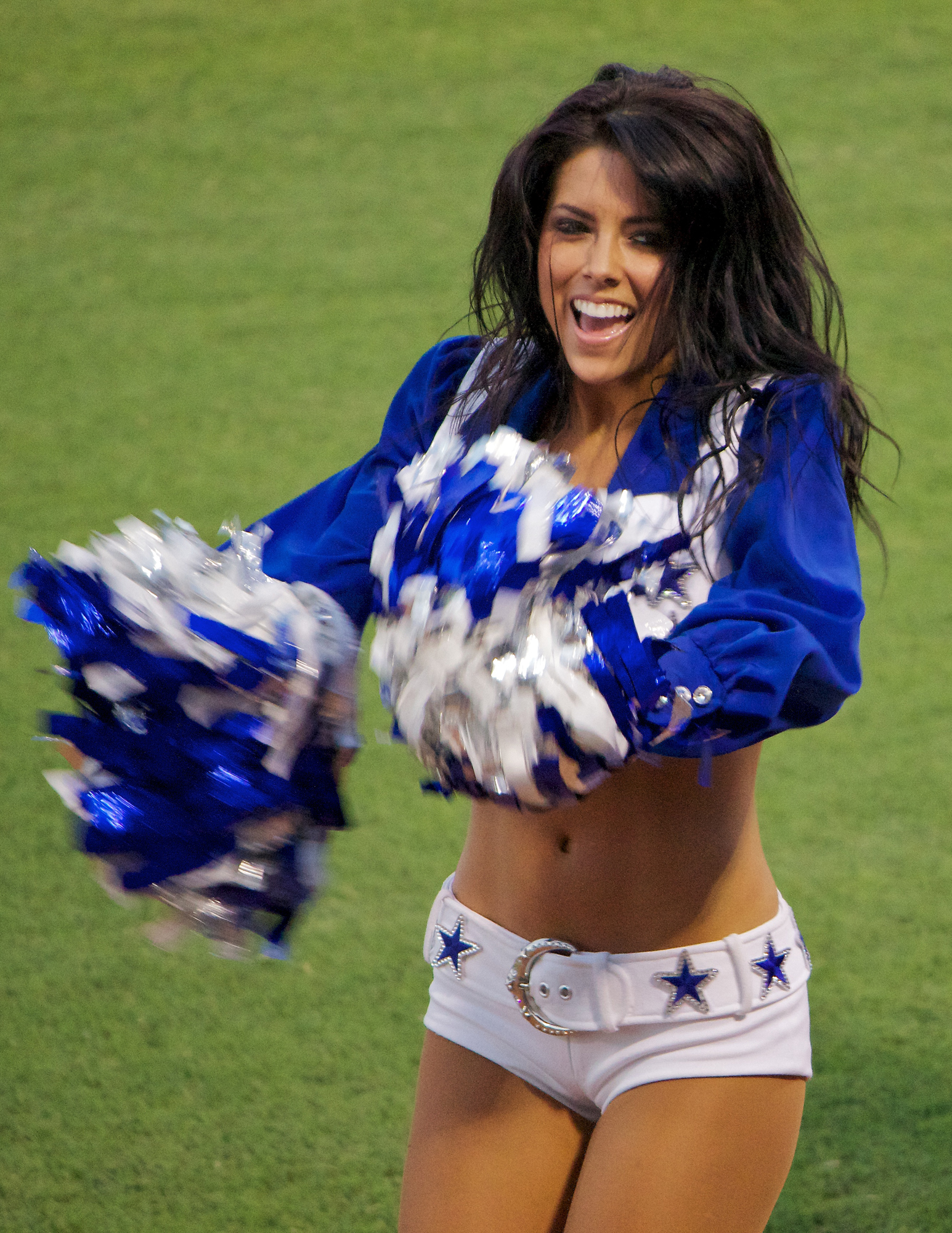
A Dallas Cowboys Cheerleader wearing uniform hotpants, 2011

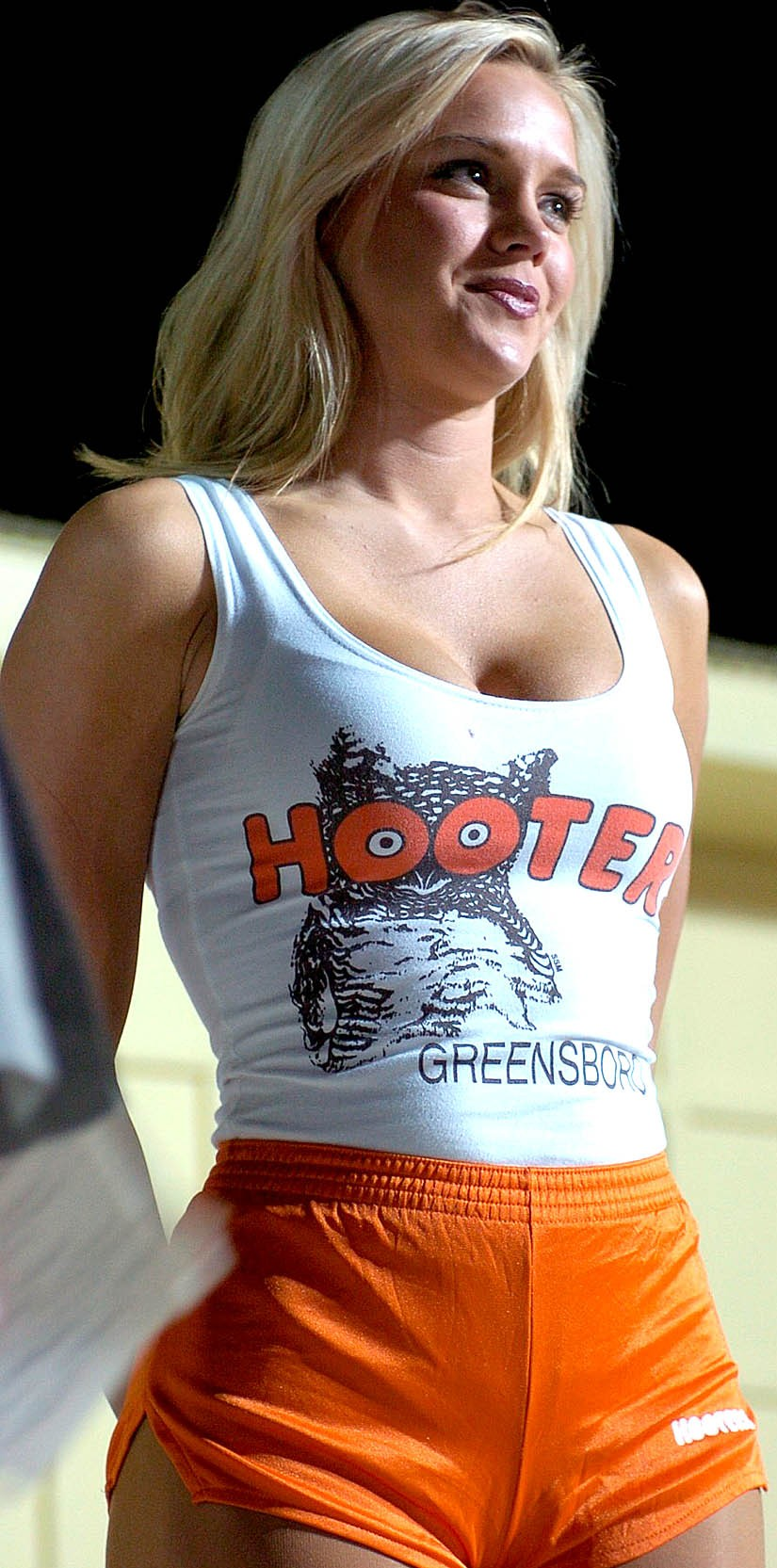
A Hooters waitress wearing a type of hotpants known as dolphin shorts.

== See also ==
- Stubbies (brand)
