= TA3 (disambiguation) =

TA3 is a Slovak private TV news channel.

TA3 may also refer to:

- TA3 (TV channel, 1991–1992), a former Slovak TV channel
- A miniature XLR connector, for microphones
- TA3 Inc., an American swimwear company
