= Jams (clothing line) =

American clothing brand

- Company type: Subsidiary
- Industry: Retail, textile
- Founded: 1964; 62 years ago
- Headquarters: Santa Monica, California, United States
- Area served: Worldwide
- Products: Surfwear • Streetwear
- Website: www.jamsworld.com

Jams is a line of clothing produced by Jams World.

== History ==
Company founder Dave Rochlen was a beach lifeguard and surfer, originally in Santa Monica, California, then in Hawaii. After reading a Life magazine article showing Russians looking comfortable attending the beach in bathrobes, Rochlen bought some brightly colored floral fabric and asked his wife Keanuenue to make a short, baggy pair of pajamas with a sewn-up fly and cut-off at the knee. They produced the first pair of Jams on December 25, 1964.

Rochlen quit his job as a systems analyst and started his new company Surf Line Hawaii, Ltd. to make and sell his new product; its name, Jams, was a shortening of pajamas. Rochlen explained the name as "I thought of it. It's part of the word 'pajamas,' of course, and it was what I wanted – short, quick, jargon, hip, young, one-syllable."

Soon after his first commercial pairs of Jams were worn at Mākaha, Hawaii, Life magazine ran a two-page spread on Rochlen and a group of his surfing friends in the June 1965 issue. After the article, the Jams line was sold in Bloomingdales, Macy's, and Lord & Taylor. By 1991, Surf Line Hawaii's annual sales totaled about US$7 million. Its garments were all cut, sewn and manufactured in a Honolulu factory.

The Jams look was baggy and bohemian, with wild prints and clashing pinks and greens. It was a clear departure from the more subtle color combinations and detailing of existing boardshorts.

== Cultural references ==
Jams were featured in three Calvin and Hobbes comics, in which Hobbes the stuffed tiger wore Jams. Susie Derkins, Calvin's playmate, found this cute.
