= Soffe =

American sportswear brand

M.J. Soffe LLC
- Company type: Subsidiary
- Industry: Retail
- Founded: 1946; 80 years ago
- Headquarters: Winston-Salem, North Carolina, U.S.
- Area served: Worldwide
- Key people: Joanna Mariani (President)
- Products: Sportswear, accessories
- Website: www.soffe.com

M.J. Soffe LLC, better known as Soffe (pronounced SO-Fee), is a brand name of apparel for youth and adults, specifically producing sportswear. It was founded in 1946 by M.J. Soffe. A common brand used by cheerleaders, Soffe produces shorts that are worn primarily by females; however, they used to be standard-issue for junior/senior high school and college P.E. classes for both boys and girls.

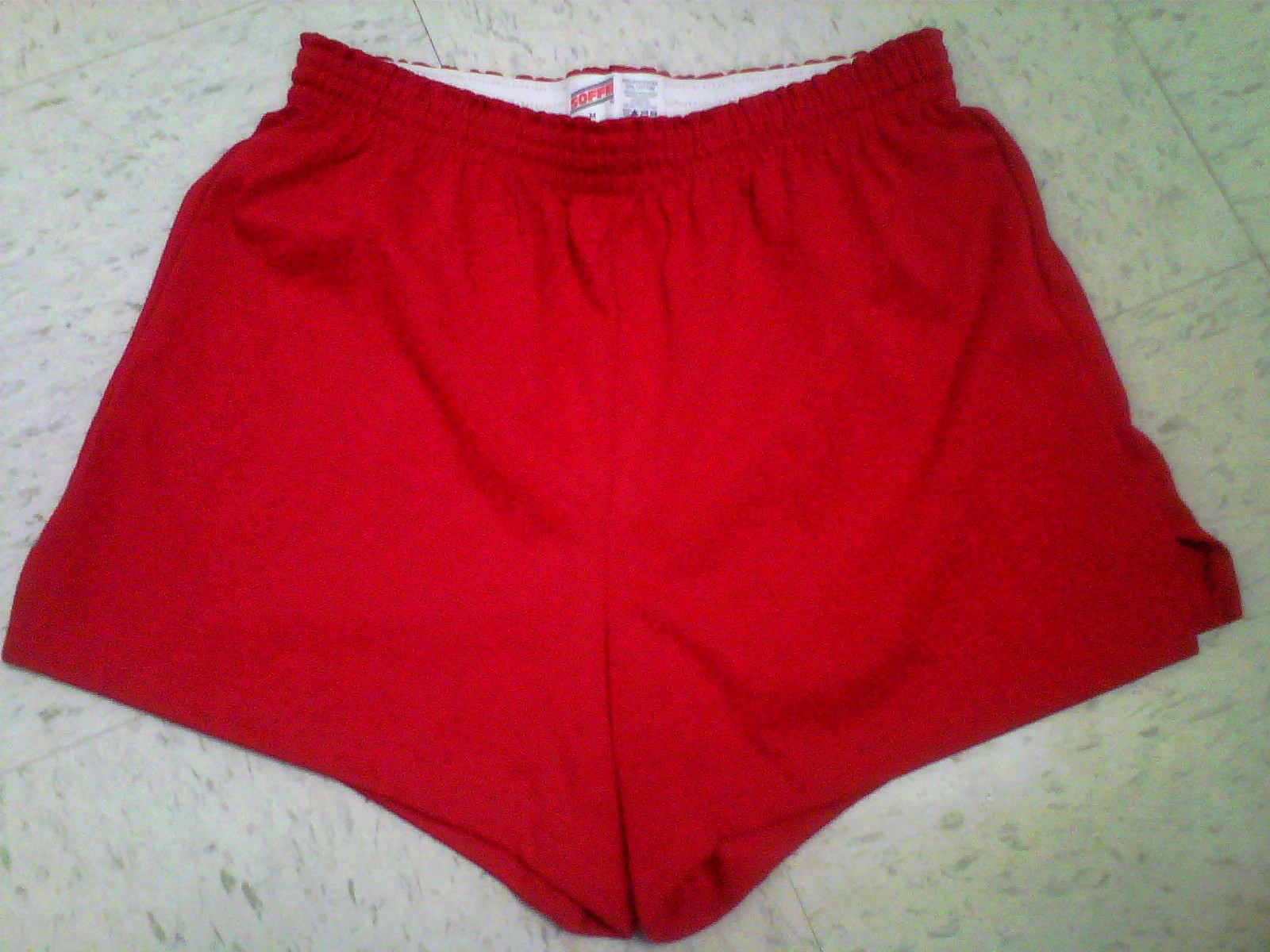
Soffe gym shorts

In 2012, the United States Marine Corps ended its licensing agreement deal with Soffe after order and design documentation for clothes bearing Marine logos was found in a burned out clothing factory in Bangladesh.

Soffe is headquartered in Fayetteville, North Carolina and is a wholly owned subsidiary of Delta Apparel Inc. Soffe products are sold in sporting good retailers and department stores. Soffe distribution centers include Miramar, Florida, Santa Fe Springs, California, Lansing, Michigan, Cranbury, New Jersey, and at the company's headquarters in North Carolina. The headquarters are also shared with Amazon as a distribution center, having done so since June 2021.

In June 2024, its parent company Delta Apparel suspended its operations in Honduras, blaming increasing cash flows as part of the decision. The company also warned that it could face possible liquidation if it wasn't able to sustain its debt. On June 30, 2024, Delta Apparel filed for Chapter 11 bankruptcy protection, blaming inflation and low demand on its products as part of the decision. The company has plans to sell its assets, and has already sold its Salt Life brand to Forager Capital Management for $28 million.

In September 2024, Renfro Brands, a leading manufacturer and marketer of quality sock and legwear products, announced the acquisition of MJ Soffe. Delta Apparel converted its Chapter 11 case into a Chapter 7 bankruptcy liquidation on March 25, 2025.
