= Teo González =

Spanish painter

Teo González is a postminimalist painter born in 1964.

945 Gotas de Tinta, Teo González 1991

== Life and work ==
González was born in Quinto and grew up in Zaragoza, Spain. During his youth he won distinctions in painting, drawing, and comic awarded by the Spanish government. In 1991 he moved to California, and later on he attended California State University in Bakersfield. He graduated magna cum laude in 1997, receiving a bachelor's degree in fine art.

Teo González's first professional solo show was in San Francisco, CA in 1996. Currently he works and lives in Brooklyn, NY. Known for his work using drops of pigment and grids, González's work is frequently compared to that of Agnes Martin, Jackson Pollock and Sol LeWitt.

== Museums and Public Collections ==
The Museum of Modern Art, N.Y., Los Angeles County Museum of Art, C.A., National Gallery of Art, Washington D.C., Museo Pablo Serrano, Zaragoza, Spain, Ayuntamiento de Miego, Santander, Spain, Corcoran Gallery of Art, Washington D.C., Hood Museum of Art, Dartmouth College, N.H., San Diego Museum of Art, C.A., New Mexico Museum of Art, Santa Fe N.M., Museo de Dibujo Julio Gavin-Castillo de Larrés, Spain, Fifth Floor Foundation, N.Y., The Judith Rothschild Foundation, N.Y., Achenbach Foundation Fine Arts Museums of San Francisco, C.A., The Progressive Art Collection O.H., Borusan Contemporary Art Collection, Istanbul, Turkey, Circa XX, Madrid Spain
