= Krizia =

Designer label and manufacturer

- Industry: Luxury fashion
- Founded: 1954; 72 years ago Milan, Italy
- Founder: Mariuccia Mandelli
- Headquarters: Milan, Italy
- Area served: Worldwide
- Products: Women’s ready-to-wear, accessories, jewelry, leather goods, shoes, perfumes
- Owner: Zhu Chongyun
- Parent: Shenzhen Marisfrolg
- Website: www.krizia.it

Krizia is a designer label and manufacturer of ladies' handbags, clothing, footwear and perfumes. The ready-to-wear fashion label was established in 1954 in Milan, Italy, by Mariuccia Mandelli (1925–2015). Her husband Aldo Pinto was chairman of the company.

== History ==
Mandelli unveiled her first black-and-white collection at the Palazzo Pitti in Florence, Italy, in 1964, which earned her a Critica della Moda award. The brand's first and historic location was on Via della Spiga, 23 in Milan. Under Mandelli, Krizia rapidly expanded during the 1960s and 1970s. In 1971, Krizia released a version of shorts cut "very short", an early form of hot pants. Every year, Mandelli would knit a different animal on selected items of her collection.

In 1985, Krizia opened a private art showroom (Spazio Krizia) on Via Manin, 21, in Milan. At its height, in the 1990s, the fashion house was doing half a billion dollars of annual business. It was while at the helm of Krizia that Mandelli introduced the high fashion world to hot pants. In 1992, the company launched its affordable brand MM by Krizia, a year after its licence-holder Hartmarx suggested it. In 1995, the company was tried in the USA, along with many other Italian fashion brands, for "bribing tax officers in exchange for lenient audits". In Italy, the investigation was handled by Mani pulite's magistrate Antonio Di Pietro.

In February 2014, Shenzhen Marisfrolg, a Chinese corporation owned by the entrepreneur and designer Zhu Chongyun, bought Krizia and Mandelli stepped down from a leadership role. In 2015, the Via della Spiga's historic store was revamped by designer Vincenzo de Cotiis. In January 2017, Simona Clemenza was named CEO of the company. Two Krizia boutiques opened in China, and in March 2017, the Spazio Krizia reopened. In June 2018, Clemenza left the company.

== See also ==
- Italian fashion
- Made in Italy
