= Stubbies (brand) =

Australian clothing brand

- Industry: Workwear
- Founded: 1972; 54 years ago
- Headquarters: Sydney, Australia
- Products: Shoes, apparel
- Owner: Workwear Group
- Website: www.stubbies.com.au

Stubbies is the brand name for fashion shorts in Australia and New Zealand. The shorts were first introduced in Australia in 1972 as short fashion shorts for men. Since then the range has expanded to include a range of workwear for both men and women.

Stubbies has entered Australasian slang vocabulary, referred to in the Australian Macquarie Dictionary as “Short shorts of tough material for informal wear.”

== History ==
The brand was established in 1972 by clothing manufacturer Edward Fletcher and Co. More than 750,000 pairs of Stubbies were sold across Australia in that first year. The company later changed its name to Stubbies because of the success of this line. The company was bought out by US-based Sara Lee Corporation in 1990 and moved offshore. Pacific Dunlop (now Pacific Brands) acquired Sara Lee Apparel Australasia in 2001 and brought the company back to Australia. Stubbies were introduced in the US in 1978 as beach shorts and were a popular brand as worn by skaters and surfers. They were a cost efficient alternative to the OP (Ocean Pacific) brand and gained some popularity.

Since 2014, the brand has been owned by Wesfarmers as a subsidiary of Hard Yakka.
