= Richard Simmons =

American fitness instructor (1948–2024)

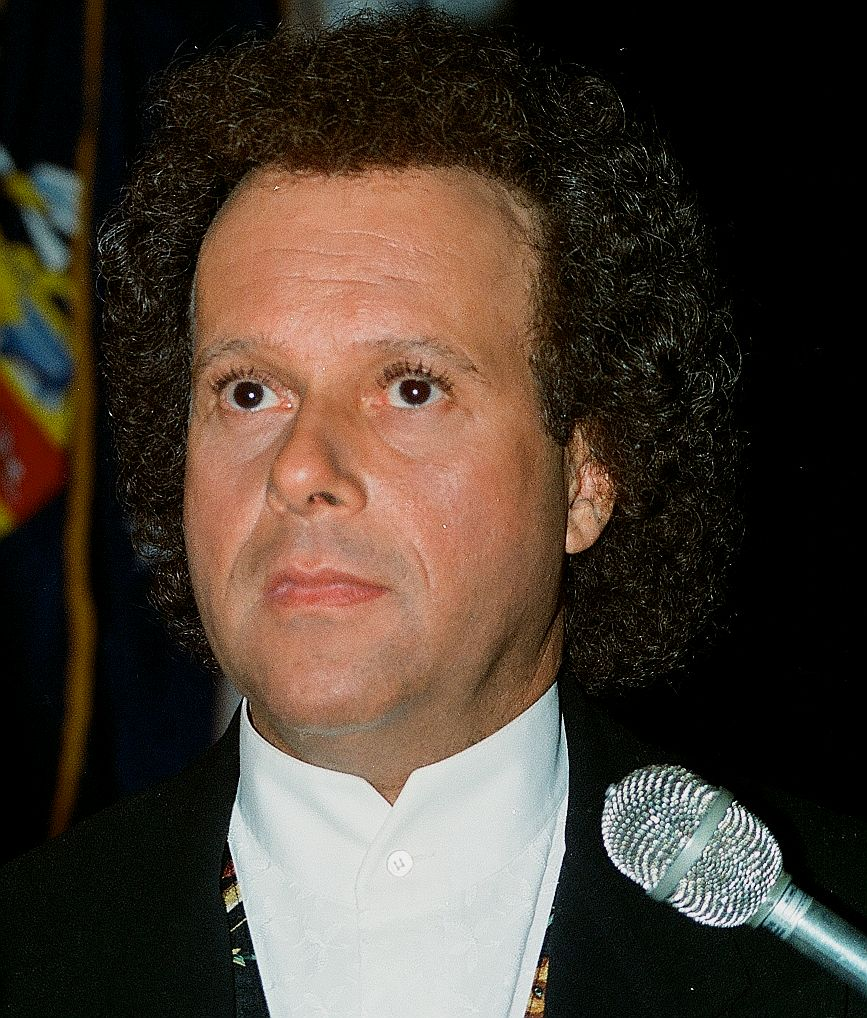
- Simmons in Washington D.C. in 1998
- Born: Milton Teagle Simmons; July 12, 1948; New Orleans, Louisiana, U.S.
- Died: July 13, 2024 (aged 76); Los Angeles, California, U.S.
- Resting place: Pierce Brothers Westwood Village Memorial Park and Mortuary, Los Angeles, California
- Other name: Richard Teagle Simmons
- Education: University of Louisiana at Lafayette; Florida State University (BA)
- Occupations: Fitness instructor; television personality; actor; video producer
- Years active: 1968–2014
- Website: richardsimmons.com

Milton Teagle "Richard" Simmons (July 12, 1948 – July 13, 2024) was an American fitness instructor and television personality. He was a promoter of weight-loss programs, most prominently through his television show, The Richard Simmons Show and later the Sweatin' to the Oldies line of aerobics videos.

Simmons began his weight-loss career by opening his gym Slimmons in Beverly Hills, California, catering to the overweight in a supportive atmosphere, and he became widely known through exposure on television and through the popularity of his consumer products. He was often parodied and was a frequent guest on late-night television and radio talk shows, such as the Late Show with David Letterman and The Howard Stern Show.

He continued to promote health and exercise through a decades-long career and later broadened his activities to include political activism, such as in 2008 in support of a bill mandating non-competitive physical education in public schools as a part of the No Child Left Behind Act.

== Early life ==
Simmons was born Milton Teagle Simmons in New Orleans on July 12, 1948, to Leonard Douglas Simmons Sr. and Shirley May (née Satin). He was born to "show-business parents" and grew up in the French Quarter of New Orleans. He had an older brother Leonard Jr. Leonard Simmons Sr. grew up Methodist working as a master of ceremonies and later in thrift stores. Shirley Simmons was Russian Jewish, a traveling fan dancer and later a store cosmetics saleswoman.

Simmons became a practicing Catholic in adolescence and attended Cor Jesu High School in New Orleans. He attended the University of Louisiana at Lafayette before graduating from Florida State University in Tallahassee with a Bachelor of Arts in art degree. He became obese during his early childhood and adolescence. He began to overeat and became overweight as early as the age of four and by five, he knew it was perceived negatively. At 15, he weighed 182 pounds (83 kg). As a young adult, he considered being a priest, but decided against it. He appeared among the "freak show" characters in the Fellini films Satyricon (1968) and The Clowns (1970) while a young art student and eventually reached a peak of 268 lb (122 kg).

In an interview with the Tampa Bay Times, Simmons said he adopted the name Richard after an uncle who paid for his college tuition. His first job in New Orleans was as a child, selling pralines at Leah's Pralines.

== Career ==
=== Fitness career ===
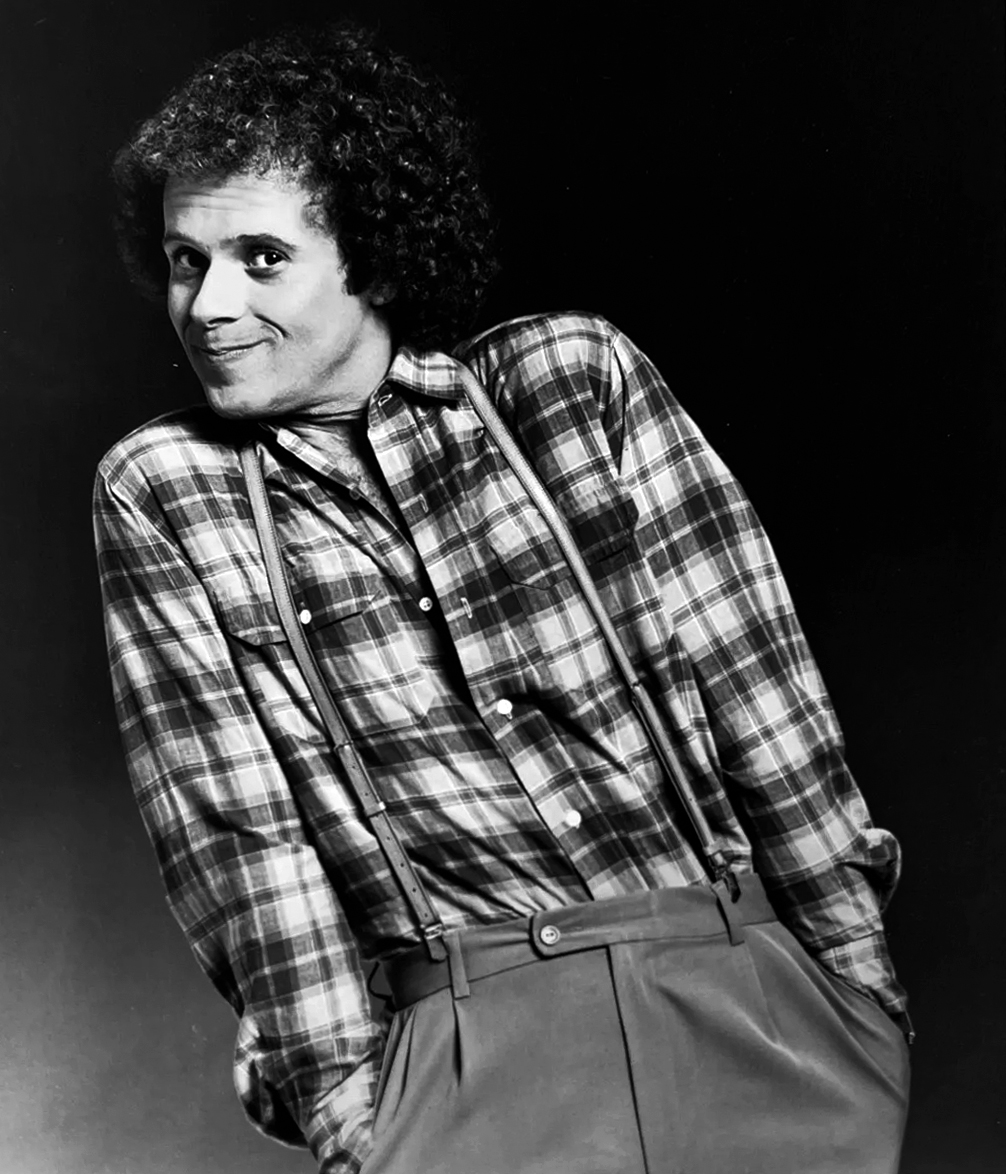
Simmons in a promo photo for his LP, "Reach" on Elektra Records, 1982

At the age of 26, Simmons traveled around the country for a job. After moving to Los Angeles in the 1970s, he worked as a waiter and the maître d'hôtel at Derek's Second Floor, a restaurant in Beverly Hills. Eventually, celebrities and producers arrived and a producer offered Simmons a job to portray himself on General Hospital. Simmons developed an interest in fitness. Exercise studios of the day favored the already fit customer, so little help was available for those who needed to gain fitness from an otherwise unhealthy state. He established gyms and his interest in fitness helped him lose 123 lb (56 kg).

He opened his own exercise studio, originally called The Anatomy Asylum, where emphasis was placed on healthy eating in proper portions and enjoyable exercise in a supportive atmosphere. The business originally included a salad bar restaurant called Ruffage, a pun on the word roughage (dietary fiber); though it was eventually removed as the focus of The Anatomy Asylum shifted solely to exercise. Later renamed Slimmons, the establishment continued to operate in Beverly Hills and Simmons taught motivational classes and aerobics throughout the week. His success led to a recurring role in General Hospital portraying himself over a four-year period and then to his own television series The Richard Simmons Show, which aired from 1980 to 1984 and earned him multiple Emmy awards. Rising interest in aerobics during the 1980s led to the popularization of Simmons's line of fitness videos, particularly his Sweatin' to the Oldies series, which became one of the most popular videos during the decade.

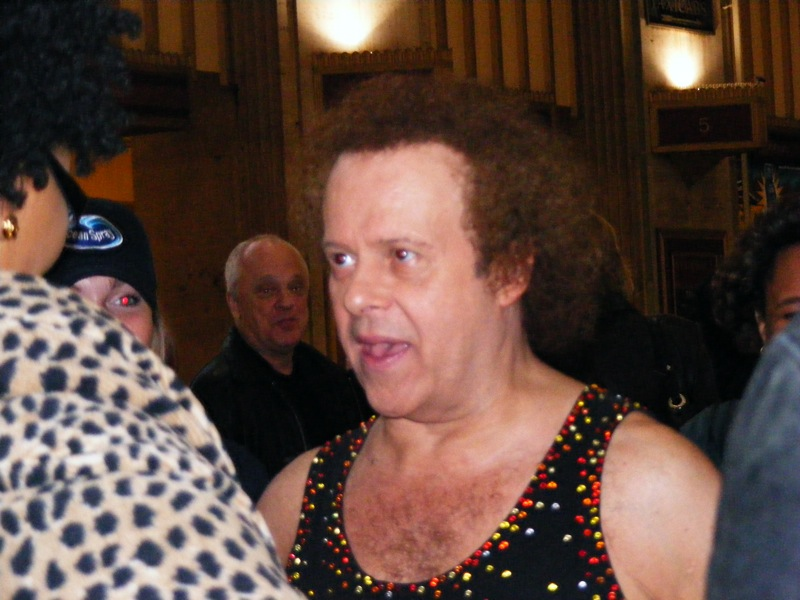
Simmons making an appearance for Ocean Spray at the 30th Street Station in Philadelphia, April 2009

In 2010, Simmons said he had maintained his own 100+ pound (45 kg) weight loss for 42 years, had been helping others lose weight for 35 years and in the course of his fitness career, had helped humanity lose approximately 12 million pounds (5.5 million kg).

=== In media ===
Simmons began to receive popularity and media attention due to the success of his health club that started with him on Real People, where he was shown at work. He introduced customers whom he had helped to lose weight. He later had guest roles in Battlestars, Super Password, Win, Lose or Draw, Body Language, Match Game (ABC), Hollywood Squares (syndicated), and Figure It Out on Nickelodeon. Positive viewer reactions landed Simmons a recurring role as himself in General Hospital over a four-year period. That and his presence in shopping malls (where he taught exercise classes), led to increased media attention. In the early 1980s, Simmons hosted two shows — Slim Cookin and the Emmy Award-winning talk show The Richard Simmons Show, in which he focused on personal health, fitness, exercise, and healthy cooking. Simmons portrayed himself in the Amazing Stories episode "Remote Control Man." On November 18, 1997, he was a guest on The Rosie O'Donnell Show, together with Celine Dion. He frequently appeared on The Howard Stern Show; his final time on the program was in 2013.

Simmons was a guest on Late Night with David Letterman (NBC) and the Late Show with David Letterman (CBS), but on November 22, 2000, they had a falling-out after an incident on that night's show. While dressed as a turkey, Simmons grabbed Letterman as if to hug or kiss him, to which Letterman responded by spraying Simmons with a fire extinguisher, which made Simmons have a severe asthma attack. Simmons did not appear on the Letterman show for six years, eventually returning on November 29, 2006. On that occasion, Letterman once again set Simmons up for a prank; while Simmons was demonstrating a steamer branded with his name, Letterman insisted on placing a tray under the steamer which Simmons did not believe belonged there. When Simmons turned the steamer on, something in the tray exploded and caught fire, sending Simmons running for his life. Despite the scare, Simmons took the incident in fairly good nature, even joking that he "felt like (he was) Michael Jackson" (referring to a mishap where Jackson's hair was accidentally set on fire by pyrotechnics while filming a Pepsi commercial).

In 1998, Simmons provided the voice of Boone in Rudolph the Red-Nosed Reindeer: The Movie. He featured as himself on numerous television series, including Whose Line Is It Anyway?, CHiPs, Saturday Night Live, The Larry Sanders Show, and in the Arrested Development episode "Bringing Up Buster." In 1999, he hosted the short-lived television series DreamMaker. On January 14, 2000, Simmons and Tribune Entertainment parted ways due to low ratings. In 2007, he filmed a PBS special Love Yourself and Win for their pledge drive.

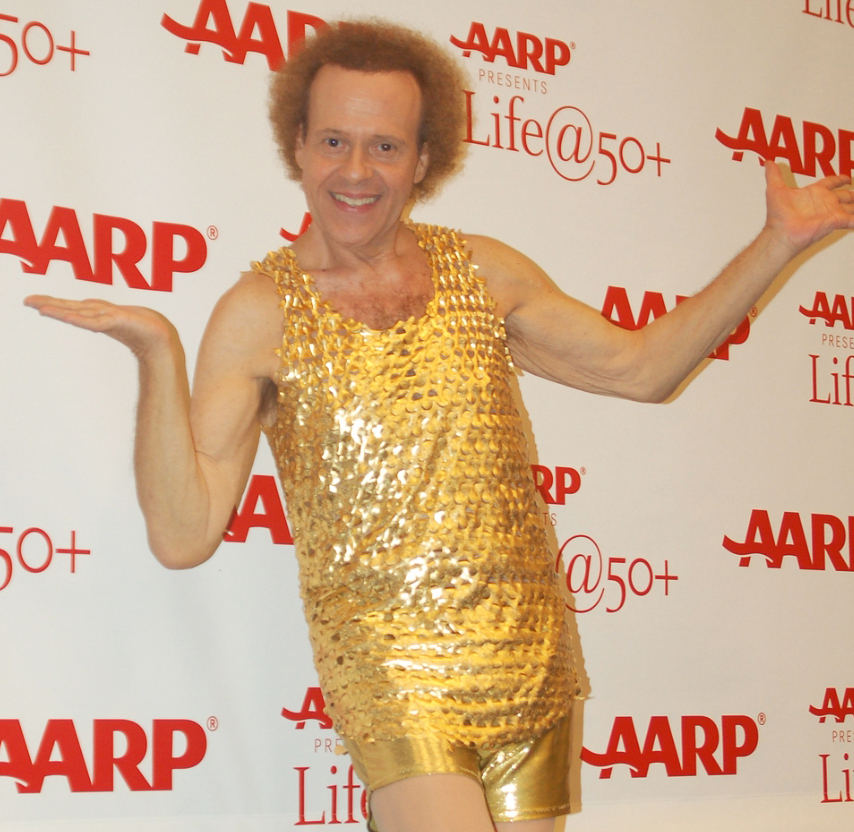
Simmons at an AARP expo held at the Los Angeles Convention Center.in Downtown Los Angeles, September 2011

He featured in television advertisements for Sprint, Yoplait, and Herbal Essence shampoo. In late 2007, he was in a This is SportsCenter commercial on ESPN as the show's "conditioning coach". In the Rocko's Modern Life episode "No Pain, No Gain", Simmons voiced an exercise trainer bearing his animated likeness, leading a class filled with large anthropomorphic animals.

Simmons appeared multiple times on The Glenn Beck Program on HLN. From 2006 to 2008, he hosted a radio show on Sirius Stars (Sirius Satellite Radio channel 102) titled Lighten Up with Richard Simmons. He provided the voice of Coach Salmons, a recurring character modeled after his own likeness, for Fish Hooks. In 2011, Simmons starred in "Fit to Fly with Richard Simmons", an Air New Zealand inflight safety briefing video modeled after his aerobic workouts. He is featured heavily in the film clip of "Hawker Boat" by Tobacco, taken from the album Fucked Up Friends.

During the COVID-19 pandemic in 2020, Simmons's YouTube channel was updated with archival exercise videos (recorded before his decision to withdraw from public life) to help people stay fit at home. A spokesperson said the move was motivated by an "overwhelming request for Richard to return in some way as a comfort" and added that Simmons was "very touched by the outreach."

In January 2024, an untitled biopic about Simmons, starring Pauly Shore, was announced and later titled The Court Jester. Simmons posted on Facebook, "I have never given my permission for this movie." In April, he said he was discussing giving his approval for a different biopic.

== Personal life ==
=== Religion ===
Simmons became a Catholic as a teenager, having first asked his parents if he could convert as a younger child. He attended church with his brother Lenny for years until being baptized and confirmed on the same day. He considered the priesthood for a time, but decided against it. He lapsed from following Catholicism in adulthood but returned to it in his later years.

=== Personality ===
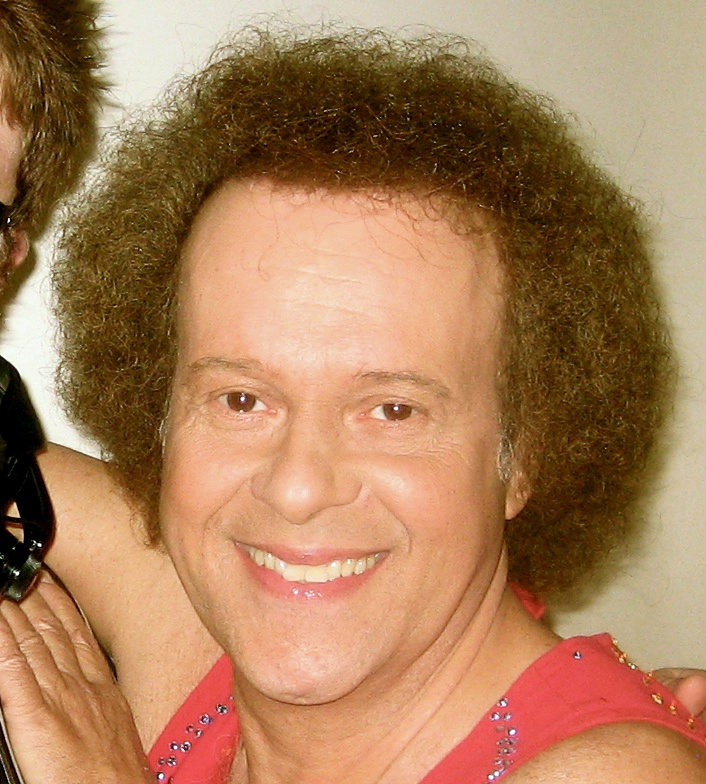
Simmons in August 2007

Simmons used his energetic, loud, and motivational demeanor to encourage people to lose weight. His high energy level was always featured in his workout videos. His trademark attire was tank tops decorated with Swarovski crystals and candy-striped Dolphin shorts.

Simmons interacted at a personal level with fans and people using his products. This began by personally answering fan mail he received as a cast member of General Hospital. As late as 2008, he personally answered emails and letters and made hundreds of phone calls each week to those who would seek his help.

He claimed to have few friends, saying, "I don't have a lot to offer to one person. I have a lot to offer to a lot of people." Aside from six Dalmatians and two maids, Simmons lived alone in Beverly Hills. Although his persona inspired speculation about his sexual orientation, he never publicly addressed the subject. After his death in 2024, Jane Fonda said she had last seen him for lunch at the Polo Lounge, when he was accompanied by a new boyfriend.

He told Men's Health in a 2012 interview:

When the king gets depressed, he doesn't call for his wife or the cook. He turns to the little man with the pointed hat and says to the court jester "make me laugh"... I am that court jester.

— Richard Simmons, Men's Health

=== Hurricane Katrina response ===
In September 2005, Simmons appeared on Entertainment Tonight to discuss the effects of Hurricane Katrina on his family in his hometown of New Orleans, and him aiding those affected by the hurricane.

On August 29, 2006, Simmons was on Your World with Neil Cavuto while making a return visit to New Orleans one year after the flooding, a visit he repeated on March 2, 2007, now talking about his recent trip to Washington D.C., to promote and raise awareness about the Strengthening Physical Education Act of 2007 (H.R. 1224).

=== Retirement ===
In 2014, Simmons did not make any major public appearances. On February 15, 2014, he stopped appearing in public altogether. In March 2016, there was speculation he was being held hostage by his housekeeper. In response, on March 14, Simmons gave an audio interview on The Today Show, denying the rumors and assuring the public that he is fine. In November 2016, the Simmons fitness gym closed without any public announcement from Simmons.

In February 2017, the podcast Missing Richard Simmons launched, investigating why Simmons left public life so suddenly. In March 2017, Los Angeles Police Department detectives visited Simmons's home to conduct a welfare check and released a statement that Simmons was "perfectly fine" and right now he is doing what he wants to do and it is his business. On April 19, after being hospitalized for severe indigestion, Simmons made his first public comment in over a year, posting on Facebook a photo of himself and the message "I'm not 'missing', just a little under the weather". However, the picture that was included in the post was from as far back as 2013, leading to speculation that the person who posted the message might not actually have been Simmons.

In May 2017, he sued the National Enquirer, Radar Online, and American Media, Inc. for libel and false claims that he was undergoing gender reassignment. In September 2017, Simmons lost the lawsuit and was ordered to pay the defendants' attorney's fees. The judge ruled, "because courts have long held that a misidentification of certain immutable characteristics do not naturally tend to injure one's reputation, even if there is sizeable portion of the population who hold prejudices against those characteristics, misidentification of a person as transgender is not actionable defamation absent special damages."

In June 2018, he sued a Los Angeles private investigator, claiming he had placed a tracking device over a year earlier on the only vehicle Simmons used for transportation, noting that such tracking is in violation of California law. In July 2018, Simmons amended the suit, alleging the investigator had been hired by In Touch Weekly and prosecutors filed a criminal complaint. In May 2020, a California appellate court upheld a trial judge's decision allowing Simmons's lawsuit to move forward. In August 2022, in response to continued rumors and a TMZ documentary What Really Happened to Richard Simmons claiming that knee problems forced Simmons out of public life, Simmons told the New York Post that he was "happy, healthy, and living the life he has chosen to live."

Teresa Reveles, who worked as Simmons's house manager and was often erroneously referred to as his housekeeper in news reports, said that Simmons retired due to failing knees which required surgery and made him unable to have the flexibility necessary to teach his fitness classes. He did not want to continue working if he was not able to fully perform up to expectations. Simmons was also nervous about aging, claiming to her that he did not "look that beautiful anymore." Even after he retreated from the public spotlight, he frequently still traveled locally in disguises and continued to motivate fans by calling and emailing them as much as he could. He donated to charities.

On July 11, 2024, two days before his death, Simmons had conducted his first interview in a significant amount of time with People. On his birthday, Simmons stated that he is grateful to be alive for another day and would spend his birthday helping people. Instead of cake, he said he would have a candle on a zucchini, stating he is a vegetarian. He added, "Okay, fine. Maybe one Pepperidge Farm Milano cookie. But just one. Sure, once in a while, have dessert." He was also calling and motivating people again and writing a Broadway musical about his life in collaboration with composer Patrick Leonard, as well as planning for a comeback and an interview with Diane Sawyer. He said that he knew the public missed him and he missed them, too.

== Illness and death ==
=== Health ===
In March 2024, Simmons issued a statement clarifying that he was not dying after a Facebook post he wrote encouraging people to "embrace every day" drew public concern. He also stated that he no longer had a manager or publicist, and that he had not given permission for a biopic of him. That same month, Simmons revealed that he had been diagnosed with skin cancer, located underneath his right eye. Simmons later stated on his Twitter account that the cancer diagnosis occurred "so many years ago" and he decided to speak out about it to encourage people to go to the doctor if they see anything unusual on their body.

=== Death ===
On July 11, 2024, Simmons suffered a fall at his home in Los Angeles in his bathroom. When his long-time house manager Teresa Reveles insisted he seek medical attention, he refused to do so until the next morning out of a desire to spend his 76th birthday at home. He went to bed and the next day, on July 12, he posted on social media, thanking fans for the outpouring of birthday wishes he received saying that he never got so many. He said that he was grateful to be alive for another day and would be helping people on his birthday.

Top: Simmons dressed as Barbra Streisand. This picture was posted to his social media accounts minutes before he was found dead.

Bottom: Simmons's final social media post, posted by his team one week after his death.

On July 13, Simmons posted a picture of himself dressed as Barbra Streisand, along with a paraphrase of lyrics from the song "Don't Rain on My Parade". Minutes later, he was found dead by Reveles. He was 76 years old. Police said that his death appeared to be from natural causes; Reveles suspected Simmons had suffered a heart attack in his sleep. On August 22, 2024, the Los Angeles County Medical Examiner’s Office confirmed Simmons’s cause of death as sequelae of blunt traumatic injuries with arteriosclerotic cardiovascular disease noted as a contributing condition. The manner of death was labeled an accident. He was buried at Pierce Brothers Westwood Village Memorial Park and Mortuary in Westwood, Los Angeles, dressed in his trademark fitness outfit. His brother Lenny stated, "We wanted to make sure that he was going to be in his normal costume that we all know and love to help the saints and the angels get into shape."

On July 20, one week after his death, Simmons's team shared a final social media post, a paraphrase of lyrics from the song "Fly Me to the Moon". On August 21, in a report given to Simmons's brother Lenny, the Los Angeles County Coroner's office confirmed that Simmons had died of complications of the previous day's fall, among others, and that heart disease was a contributing factor; no unprescribed drugs had been in his system when he died.

On October 5, a memorial mass for Simmons was held at St. Louis Cathedral in New Orleans hosted by his brother Lenny, who gave the eulogy. Lenny said, "We made a promise to my brother that we would have a celebration of his life in his hometown." With several hundred people in attendance at St. Louis Cathedral, Lenny opened the service with an 11-minute recounting of his brother's personal and professional history.

== Print and other media ==
=== Books ===
- Never Say Diet
- Never Say Diet Cookbook
- The Better Body Book
- Deal-A-Meal Cookbook
- Reach for Fitness: A Special Book of Exercises for the Physically Challenged
- Richard Simmons' Never Give Up: Inspirations, Reflections, Stories of Hope
- Farewell to Fat
- Sweetie Pie: The Richard Simmons Private Collection of Dazzling Desserts
- Still Hungry After All These Years: My Story
- The Food Mover Cookbook
- Cookin' on Broadway
- Steam Away the Pounds

=== Audio ===
==== Analog compact cassette ====
- Project Me (six-tape set)
- Take a Walk
- Take a Hike
- Sweatin' and Sharin’ With Richard Simmons & Friends
- Walk Across America
- Colors of Your Life (single tape)
- Colors of Your Life (six tape set)
- Secrets of the Winners (single tape)
- Take a Classical Walk
- Walkin' on Broadway
- Walk Around the World
- Never Give Up: Inspirations, Reflections, Stories of Hope (book on tape, read by Simmons)

==== Compact disc ====
- Richard Picks the Hits, Volume 1
- Richard Picks the Hits, Volume 2
- Country Cardio
- Oh Happy Day
- Fitness Fiesta
- Wicked Workout
- Big Screen Burn
- Shimmy into Shape
- In the Mood to Lose
- Classical Chillout

==== Vinyl record ====
- Reach (Elektra Records, 1982) – AUS No. 12

==== Singles ====
- This Time (Elektra Records, 45 rpm 1983)

==== Digital compact cassette ====
- Colors of Your Life (single tape) (Goodtimes Entertainment, BASF 90 Min. 1998)

=== Visual media ===
==== DVD ====
- Richard Simmons and the Silver Foxes
- Latin Blast Off
- Mega Mix Blast Off
- Mega Mix 2 Blast Off
- Disco Blast Off
- '60s Blast Off
- '80s Blast Off
- Blast and Tone
- Disco Sweat
- SuperSweatin': Party Off the Pounds
- SuperTonin': Totally Tonin
- SuperTonin': Totally Tonin' with Toning Rings
- Sit Tight
- Sweatin' to the Oldies
- Sweatin' to the Oldies 2
- Sweatin' to the Oldies 3
- Sweatin' to the Oldies 4
- Sweatin' to the Oldies 5
- Love Yourself and Win
- Boogie Down the Pounds
- Tonin' to the Oldies
- "Richard Simmons Project H.O.P.E. – Health, Optimism, Passion, Energy"

==== Video cassette ====
- Everyday with Richard Simmons
- The Stomach Formula
- Get Started
- Reach for Fitness – A Special Video of Exercises for the Physically Challenged
- Deal Your Way to Health
- Richard Simmons and the Silver Foxes
- Sweatin' to the Oldies
- Sweatin' to the Oldies 2
- Sweatin' to the Oldies 3
- Sweatin' to the Oldies 4
- Day By Day (Volumes 1–12)
- Pump and Sweat
- Step and Sweat
- Tone and Sweat
- Stretchin' to the Classics
- Dance Your Pants Off!
- Tonin' Uptown
- Tonin' Downtown
- Groovin' In The House
- The Ab Formula
- No Ifs Ands or Butts
- Love to Stretch
- Blast Off
- Broadway Sweat
- Tone Up On Broadway
- Broadway Blast Off
- Platinum Sweat
- Sit Tight
- Latin Blast Off
- Mega Mix Blast Off
- Mega Mix 2 Blast Off
- Disco Blast Off
- 60's Blast Off
- 80's Blast Off
- Blast and Tone
- Farewell to Fat
- Disco Sweat
- Sudar Mucho

==== YouTube ====
- Fit to Fly
- Hair Do (Official Music Video)

==== Television/movies ====
- The Richard Simmons Show
- Family Feud
- Fish Hooks
- Johnny Bravo
- Fame
- General Hospital
- Late Show with David Letterman
- The Howard Stern Show
- Pictionary
- Win, Lose or Draw
- Super Password
- The Roseanne Show
- Larry King Live
- Match Game
- Live with Regis and Kathie Lee
- Honey, I Blew Up the Kid
- Rocko's Modern Life
- Body Language
- Richard Simmons Dream Maker
- Hollywood Squares
- Wheel of Fortune
- The Wendy Williams Show
- Figure it Out
- The Ellen DeGeneres Show
- Whose Line Is It Anyway?
- The Doctors
