= Boardshorts =

Type of swimwear and casual wear

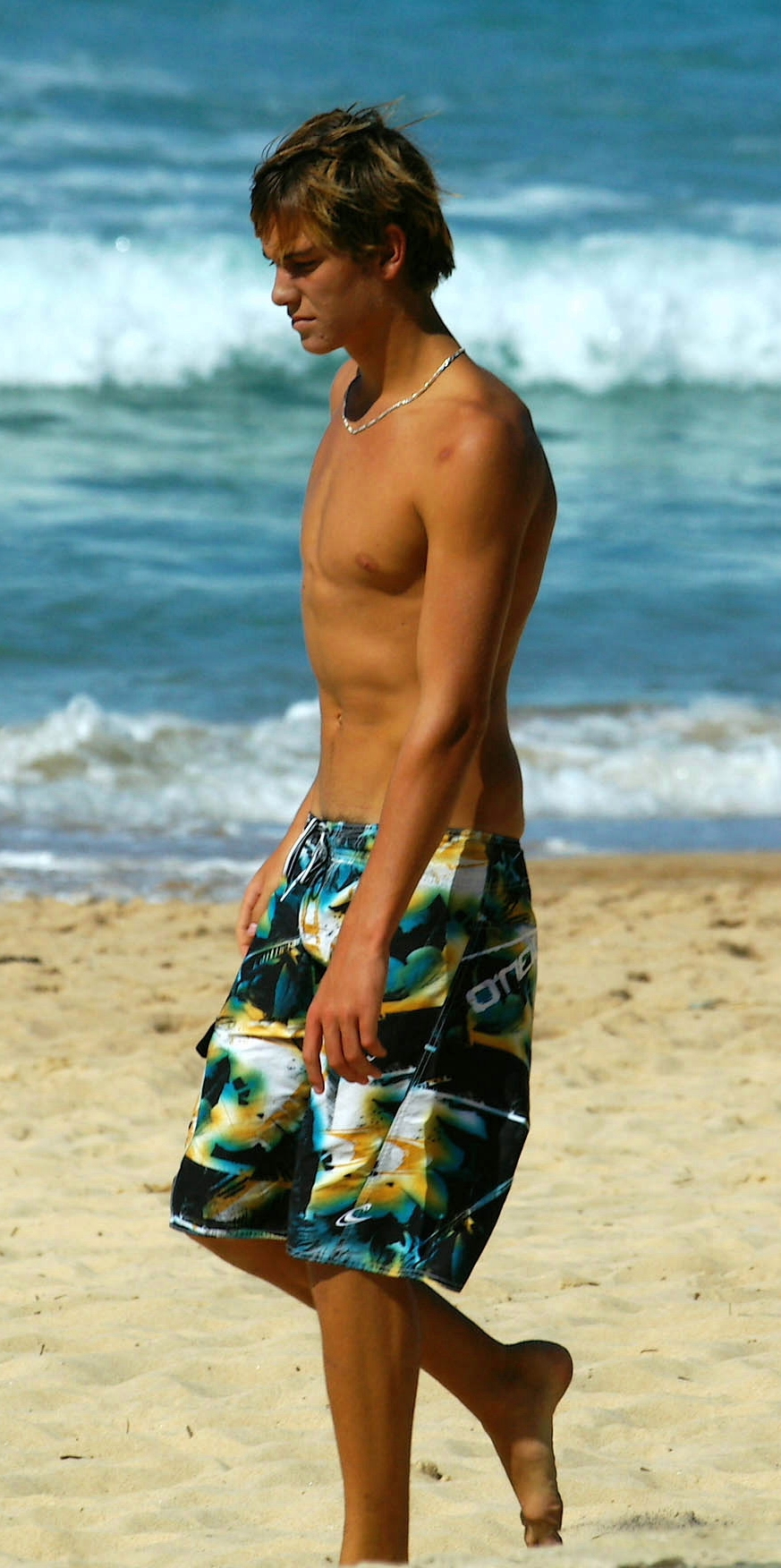
A young man wearing O'Neill boardshorts

Boardshorts are a type of swimwear and casual wear in the form of long (approximately knee length) loose-fitting shorts that are designed to be quick-drying and are generally made from strong and smooth polyester or nylon material. Originally known as surf trunks, later as Jams, and occasionally in British English as swim shorts, boardshorts are a style of male and, more recently, female summerwear.

The name "boardshorts" is based on their use in aquatic sports that use a board, such as surfing or paddleboarding. They may also be called boardies (coined by Body Glove in 1953) especially in Australia, or baggies particularly in South Africa.

Boardshorts have evolved over the last 50 years and separated themselves from the simpler swim trunks category from which they originated. In the beginning of their history, change happened organically – individual solutions were born out of the need to address environmental requirements and inadequacies in a garment that was increasingly used specifically for surfing. Although they are now considered a popular form of general beachwear, much of today's mass consumer acceptance is based on competing brands marketing themselves as being authentic due to their historical roots within the surfing lifestyle and their product's technical authority.

Boardshorts are especially popular in North America and spread beyond surfing especially as the skater punk fashion trend got underway. They are also typically worn in men's beach volleyball.

== Use and design ==
Boardshorts are designed to be quick-drying, and are generally made from strong and smooth polyester or nylon material. They are durable and hold up to wear from contact with a surfboard, yet are comfortable and light-weight. They are well-adapted to use in various active watersports.

Boardshorts do not have an elastic waist like many swim shorts do; instead they have a more rigid waistband which opens at the front, often with a velcro fly. The waistband is also held together at the front with a lace-up tie or in some cases double snaps. This double fail-safe system is in order to ensure that the shorts cannot be pulled off the body by the force of the wave when a surfer is tumbled underwater during a wipeout. Another common feature of authentic surfing boardshort design is a very small pocket sealed with Velcro and vented with a grommet. This is designed to be a secure place to carry a car key, house key, or hotel key card while in the water. Boardshorts traditionally have no lining, unlike traditional swim shorts.

Boardshorts are normally longer than many shorts or form-fitting briefs styles of swimwear, and often (other than the waist) they have a loose or baggy appearance. The major reason for the extra length is to protect the wearer's legs from wax on the board. Surfboards are covered with a layer of sticky wax, which allows the surfer to stand on the board without slipping off. However, this wax can rip hair off the leg of a surfer when sitting on the board waiting for waves. Long boardshorts cover the back of the leg when sitting on the board, preventing the wax from ripping off the leg hair. The length of boardshorts is also affected by fashion trends; the length can range from mid-thigh (old school) to below the knee, covering the entire knee. In the 2000s, boardshorts were often worn low in the back, exposing the top of the buttocks. Many designs of boardshorts use vibrant color, striking patterns including Hawaiian floral images, and highlighted stitching; however not all boardshorts have these features.

Although the basic design for boardshorts remains largely the same, some manufacturers have taken advantage of new technology. Because surfers and other water-sports enthusiasts commonly wear boardshorts without underwear, one of the major complaints has been about the use of velcro for the fly closure which tends to entangle pubic hair. A solution that some manufactures have come up with is to use a neoprene fly, which does not allow the fly to completely open, but provides enough stretch so that the shorts can be easily pulled on and off. Pubic hair does not get caught on the neoprene fly. To remedy another common complaint, about boardshorts stitching in the inseam area which would rub directly against the wearer's skin, many manufacturers switched to a seamless design, or use welding or glue, rather than stitches. For boardshorts without a liner, some males choose to wear a swim brief or some other type of tight swimwear underneath even though boardshorts are designed to be worn without. Some male wearers prefer to wear regular underwear such as compression shorts, boxer shorts, a jockstrap, boxer briefs, or briefs under them, while others wear nothing underneath at all. Some female surfers wear a one-piece swimsuit or bikini bottom under boardshorts.

Some styles of mixed martial arts shorts were developed from boardshorts. Men's physique class in the National Physique Committee also uses boardshorts for onstage competition.

Almost all swimsuit manufacturers and many designer brands now produce boardshorts. There are also boardshort-specific retailers, which offer an assortment of boardshorts to the surfing and wakeboarding public.

== See also ==
- Glossary of surfing
