= Dolfin Swimwear =

American swimwear company

- Formerly: Reading Airchutes, Inc. (1941 - 1946)
- Industry: Textiles, Apparel
- Founded: (1941; 85 years ago)
- Headquarters: Reading, Pennsylvania, United States
- Area served: Worldwide
- Key people: Jim Korth (President and CEO)
- Products: Swimwear, accessories
- Parent: Elite Sportswear, L.P.
- Website: www.dolfinswimwear.com

Dolfin Swimwear is an American company that manufactures and sells competitive and recreational swimwear. The brand is well known for its "Dolfin Uglies" product line, which features brightly colored swimsuits in a wide range of designs. In 2015, Dolfin released the Titanium Technical swimsuit, a high-tech competition swimsuit designed for elite racing. Other products include apparel, swimming accessories, water aerobics gear and beach swimwear.

Dolfin, founded in Reading, Pennsylvania in 1941, is a subsidiary of Jade Swimwear, L.P. The company's headquarters are in Mohnton, Pennsylvania.

== History ==
The company was founded in 1941 as Reading Airchutes Inc., a manufacturer of cargo parachutes for the U.S. Air Force. It became a leading supplier of cargo and bomb parachutes during World War II, with over 500 employees, most of whom were women with relatives serving in the military.

In 1946, the company was renamed after Jean Vernon, an employee who took a leave of absence during the war to serve in the United States Coast Guard Women's Reserve, otherwise known as SPARS. Vernon was recognized by the U.S. Navy for her bravery after weathering the 1945 Homestead hurricane while stationed in Florida. Under its new name, the company began manufacturing and distributing silk and nylon lingerie.

In 1958, the company expanded into the competitive swimwear market and began manufacturing nylon swimsuits for racing under the brand name Dolfin - named for its association with the aquatic mammal.

In the 1960s, Dolfin introduced a line of track uniforms made out of the nylon/tricot fabric the company used in its swimsuits at the time. The running uniforms were created at the request of a group of track coaches who wanted a replacement material for the heavier wool and jersey uniforms that were in use at the time. Dolfin continued to sell track clothing throughout the 1970s and 1980s, while maintaining production of swimsuits.

Dolfin International Corporation was purchased by Phantom Industries Inc., later renamed Jade Swimwear L.P., in 2008. In 2016, Jade Swimwear was purchased by GK Elite Sportswear, maker of gymnastics clothing, which, in turn, is an affiliate of the private equity group The Riverside Company.

Dolfin introduced a new logo in 2014 that will be incorporated on all Dolfin products starting in 2016, Dolfin's 75th anniversary year.

== Dolfin Uglies ==
Dolfin began in the early 2000s to see increased demand for the promotional prints swimsuits suits featuring bright colors and unique designs that the company initially had struggled to sell each year.

The "Uglies" term was coined by customers who requested the unique, eye-popping printed swimsuits.

The success of the Dolfin Uglies line increased Dolfin Swimwear's presence in the competitive swimwear market.

== Dolfin Titanium Technical Suit ==
Dolfin released its Titanium Tech suit in January 2015. The high-tech suit's "4-stage framing system" employs welding to control major muscle groups and to stabilize water displacement zones, a compression liner that targets large muscle zones, woven fibers to increase strength and decrease weight, and hydrophobic-coated fibers to repel water, reducing water absorbency and drag.

== See also ==
- List of swimwear brands
- TA3 Inc.
