= Mariuccia Mandelli =

Italian fashion designer and entrepreneur

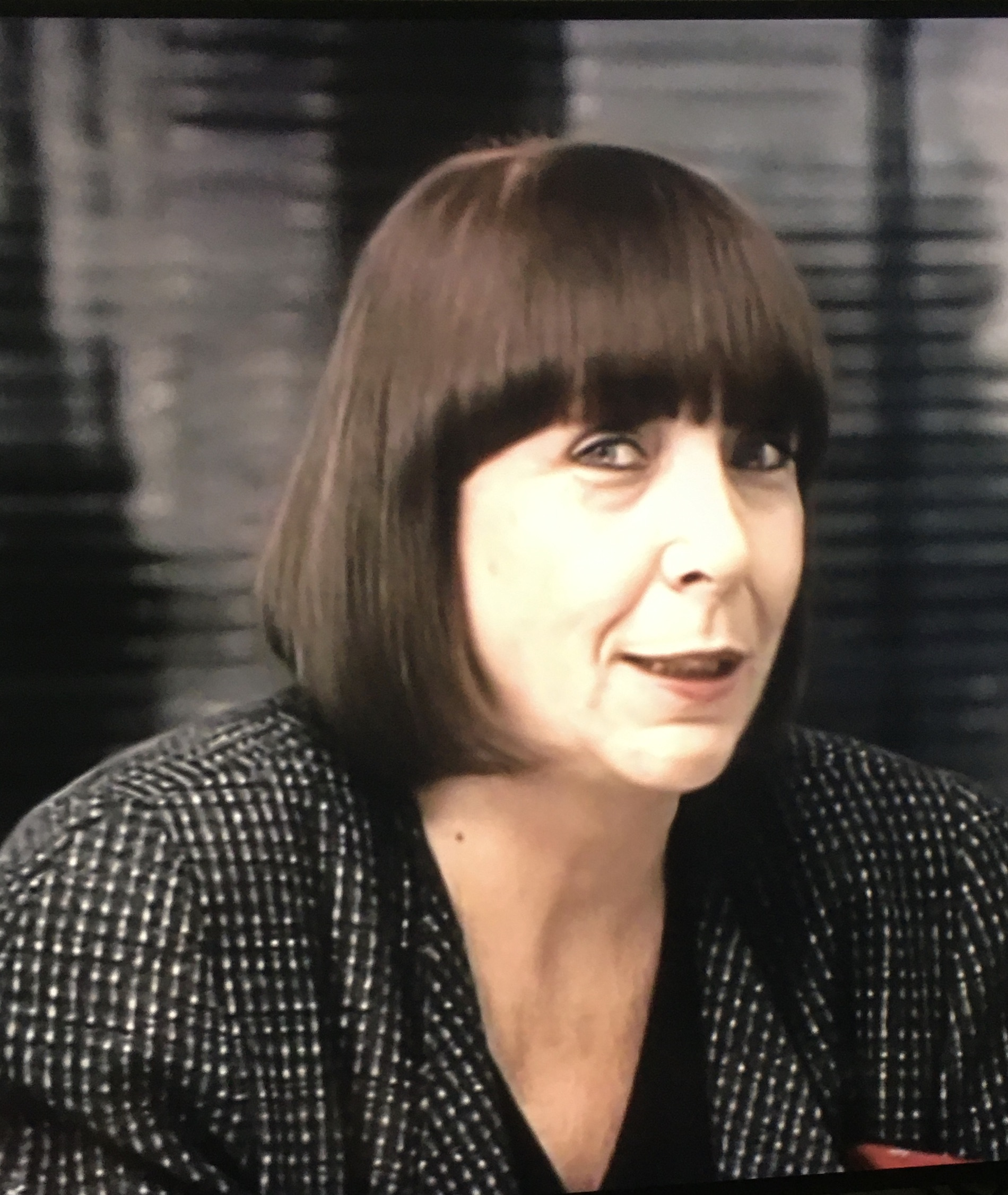
- Mandelli in 1989
- Born: 31 January 1925; Bergamo
- Died: 6 December 2015 (aged 90); Milan
- Occupations: Fashion designer and entrepreneur

Mariuccia Mandelli, known professionally as Krizia, (31 January 1925 – 6 December 2015) was an Italian fashion designer and entrepreneur. Mandelli established her ready-to-wear fashion house, Krizia, in 1954 by bringing suitcases of samples to shops in Milan out of her Fiat 500. The Guardian has called her the "godmother of Italian fashion." According to the New York Times, Mandelli was one of the first female fashion designers to create a popular line of men's wear.

== Career ==
Mandelli was born in Bergamo on January 31, 1925. She had a talent as a seamstress and an interest in fashion, but studied to be a teacher based on her mother's advice. Mandelli worked as a teacher for several years until her friend, Flora Dolci, offered use of a flat in Rome for six months rent-free. She purchased an old sewing machine in the early 1950s and founded her label, Krizia, in 1954 by selling clothes from her Fiat 500.

In 1964, she unveiled her first black-and-white collection at the Palazzo Pitti in Florence, which earned a Critica della Moda award. The fashion house grew rapidly during the 1960s and 1970s. Under Mandelli, Krizia released a version of shorts cut "very short" in 1971, now seen as an early form of hot pants. Krizia grew into a $500 million business at its height during the 1990s.

By the end of the 1980s, she bought land in Punta Volpe, Costa Smeralda, and hired the architect Gianni Gamondi to build a luxurious seafront loggia. The property was listed on sale by Sotheby's in 2022.

Mariuccia Mandelli died at her home in Milan on 6 December 2015, at the age of 90.
