= Hot Pants (Gene Summers song) =

Single by Gene Summers & the Platinum Fog
- B-side: "Young Voices of Children"
- Released: February 5, 1971
- Recorded: February 2, 1971-Dallas, TX
- Genre: Funk, Northern soul
- Length: 1:55
- Label: Charay Records, United States; W&G Records, Australia
- Songwriters: Mary Tarver; Dea Summers; Maj. Bill Smith; Dan Edwards

"Hot Pants" is a song recorded on February 2, 1971 in Dallas, Texas by Gene Summers & the Platinum Fog. Rush-released in the United States by Charay Records on February 5, 1971, it preceding the release of James Brown's song of the same name by several months. It was reviewed favorably by Cash Box and as a "Personal Pick" by the Gavin Report.

"Hot Pants" was also issued in Australia on the W&G Records label on March 3, 1971.

== Reviews ==
- The Cash Box Newcomer Picks - February 13, 1971
  "HOT PANTS"
  GENE SUMMERS (Charay 100) (1:55) [Softcharay, BMI - Tarver-Dea Summers-Edwards-Smith]
  SALVAGE (Odax 420) (2:25) [VanLee-Emily, BMI - Vance, Pockriss]
  With photo coverage still stunning the national eye, fashion's biggest sensation since the mini gives vent to two novelty sides on "hot pants." These songs capitalize on humor and quick entertainment for one-shot action. Here, both rush productions fuse slow-funk rhythm with bubble gum lyrics to gain maximum teen potential.
- THE SUN NEWS - New Releases - Monday, May 3, 1971 - Page 28 (Melbourne, Australia)
  A SONG ON HOT PANTS
  GENE SUMMERS and the Platinum Fog head a week of moderate new releases. Other records come from Booker T. and the MGs, Jacques Deray, the Hollies, Quincey Conserve, Anne Murray, Chairmen of the Board and Barbra Streisand.
  HIT PICK
  "HOT PANTS". Gene Summers and the Platinum Fog (W&G). The first of two records on this subject recently, but this one is worthwhile. Great rhythm, but with a limited subject. Flip side: The Young Voices Of Children.

== Sources ==
Gene Summers discography from Rocky Productions, France
Gene Summers discography from Wangdangdula Finland
Gene Summers session data from Tapio's Fin-A-Billy, Finland

== See also ==
Rockin' Country Style (for sound clips and label shots)
