= Hot Pants Patrol =

American promotional group for the Philadelphia Phillies

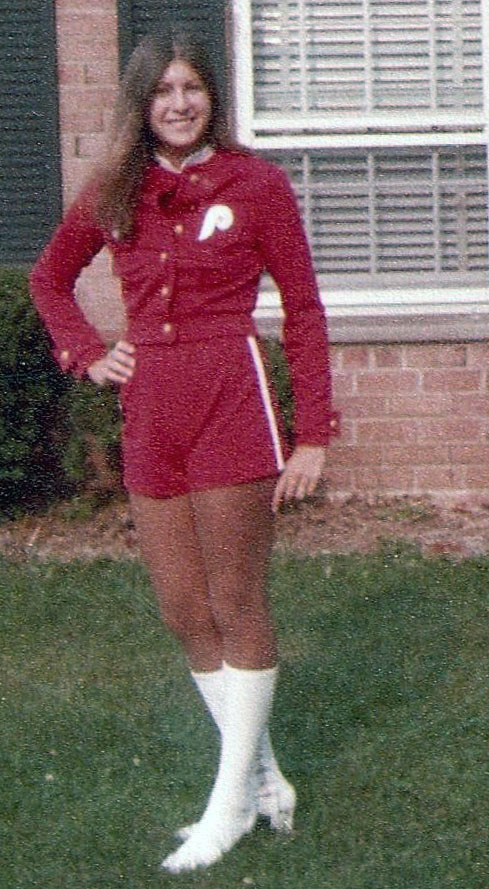
Pictured is a member of the Philadelphia Phillies Hot Pants Patrol

The Hot Pants Patrol was a group used by the Philadelphia Phillies baseball team in the 1970s, designed to attract greater attendance, particularly by men, to home games at Veterans Stadium. It consisted of a number of attractive young "fillies" or "usherettes" who were assigned to various sections throughout the stadium. Their uniform consisted of red jumpsuit incorporating hot pants (hence the name) emblazoned with the Phillies logo and white trim, albeit slightly longer pants than what normally was worn along with white go-go boots.

The Hot Pants Patrol debuted on April 10, 1971, the opening game at Veterans Stadium. There were 140 Fillies at the first game who were recruited from 432 applicants and advised by letter to wear "your shortest skirt and tightest blouse" to interviews. The 35 Fillies designated best looking were called, collectively, the Hot Pants Patrol and wore red hot pants.

The Fillies last season was 1982 by which time the Phillie Phanatic mascot had established itself as the center of Veterans Stadium in-game entertainment.
