= TA3 Inc. =

American swimwear company

- Trade name: TA3 Swim
- Company type: Private
- Industry: Fashion
- Founded: 2019
- Founder: Leila Shams
- Headquarters: Los Angeles, California, USA
- Key people: Leila Shams (CEO); Brent Dougherty (President)
- Products: Corset-inspired swimsuits, body-sculpting swimwear, apparel
- Website: ta3swim.com

TA3 Inc. (doing business as TA3 Swim) is an American swimwear company founded in Los Angeles, California, in 2019 by fashion designer Leila Shams. The company is known for its body-sculpting swimwear, including corset-inspired swimwear and ready-to-wear apparel. TA3 Swim's designs have been worn by Beyonce, Billie Eilish, Remi Bader, Bebe Rexha, January Jones, Ashley Graham, and Drew Barrymore.

== History ==
TA3 Inc. was founded in 2019 by Leila Shams, who had experience in fashion industry. In 2021, Shams appeared in season 13 of Shark Tank, seeking an investment of $500,000 in exchange for a 10% equity stake in TA3, but did not receive investment. In February 2022 the company began using personalized virtual fitting room for each shopper. As of January 2023, TA3 had an annual revenue of $20 million.

== Products ==
TA3's produces corset-inspired swimsuits and apparel with a focus on shaping the waist, supporting the bust, and flattening the stomach. The fabric of the swimwear is a lightweight activewear compression material with a corseted design at the back.

== Operations ==
The company operates primarily as a direct-to-consumer business, primarily using social media platforms to promote the brand and sell its products through its official website. TA3 holds one utility patent and two design patents for its swimwear. The brand also holds several trademarks, including "Snatchtastic" and "Mega Sculpting Fashion" and "Super Power Suit". The company exports its products to several countries, including the United States, Canada, the United Kingdom, and Australia. It is headquartered in Los Angeles, California. Leila Shams serves as the company's CEO, and her husband, Brent Dougherty, holds the position of president.
