= List of USC Trojans in the NFL draft =

This is a list of USC Trojans football players in the NFL draft.

== Key ==
B	Back	K	Kicker	NT	Nose tackle
C	Center	LB	Linebacker	FB	Fullback
CB	Cornerback	P	Punter	HB	Halfback
DE	Defensive end	QB	Quarterback	WR	Wide receiver
DT	Defensive tackle	RB	Running back	G	Guard
OT	Offensive tackle				
E	End	S	Safety	TE	Tight end

== Selections ==
Year	Round	Pick	Overall	Player	Team	Position
1937	10	3	93	Gil Kuhn	Brooklyn Dodgers	T
1939	10	7	87	Raymond George	Detroit Lions	T
1939	14	8	128	Bob Hoffman	Washington Redskins	B
1939	18	8	168	Boyd Morgan	Washington Redskins	B
1939	19	7	177	Amerigo Tonelli	Detroit Lions	G
1940	1	6	6	Doyle Nave	Detroit Lions	B
1940	1	10	10	Grenny Lansdell	New York Giants	B
1940	3	6	21	Bill Fisk	Detroit Lions	E
1940	5	6	36	Harry Smith	Detroit Lions	G
1940	7	6	56	Bob Winslow	Detroit Lions	E
1940	9	8	78	Bob Hoffman	Washington Redskins	B
1940	11	8	98	Howard Stoecker	Washington Redskins	T
1940	12	9	109	Phil Gaspar	Green Bay Packers	T
1940	13	9	119	Ambrose Schindler	Green Bay Packers	B
1941	7	10	60	Al Krueger	Washington Redskins	E
1941	9	6	76	Ben Sohn	New York Giants	G
1941	11	6	96	Bobby Peoples	New York Giants	B
1941	12	10	110	Jack Banta	Washington Redskins	B
1942	1	7	7	Bobby Robertson	Brooklyn Dodgers	B
1942	10	2	82	Bob deLauer	Cleveland Rams	T
1943	9	8	78	Norm Verry	Green Bay Packers	T
1943	17	8	158	Ron Thomas	Green Bay Packers	G
1943	20	3	183	Bill Bledsoe	Brooklyn Dodgers	E
1943	32	3	298	Ken Roskie	Green Bay Packers	B
1944	3	3	19	Ralph Heywood	Detroit Lions	E
1944	3	7	23	Earl Audet	Washington Redskins	T
1944	6	6	49	Mickey McCardle	Green Bay Packers	B
1944	8	11	76	Bob Musick	Boston Yanks	B
1944	12	9	118	Earle Parsons	Philadelphia Eagles	B
1944	16	2	155	Doug Essick	Brooklyn Dodgers	E
1944	16	10	163	John Aguirre	Cleveland Rams	T
1944	18	2	177	Don Willer	Brooklyn Dodgers	T
1944	19	2	188	Howard Callanan	Brooklyn Dodgers	B
1944	20	8	205	Paul Taylor	Chicago Bears	B
1944	23	8	238	Dick Jamison	Chicago Bears	T
1944	25	2	254	Dick Manning	Brooklyn Dodgers	B
1945	1	8	8	Jim Hardy	Washington Redskins	QB
1945	15	8	150	Eddie Saenz	Washington Redskins	B
1945	18	9	184	Quentin Klenk	Philadelphia Eagles	T
1945	23	2	232	Wally Crittenden	Brooklyn Dodgers	B
1945	25	3	255	Jerry Whitney	Brooklyn Dodgers	B
1945	27	1	275	Hal Finney	Brooklyn Dodgers	B
1945	28	5	290	Pat West	Cleveland Rams	B
1945	28	7	292	Milford Dreblow	Washington Redskins	B
1945	30	10	317	Joe Wolf	New York Giants	C
1946	1	7	7	Leo Riggs	Philadelphia Eagles	B
1946	3	8	23	Gordon Gray	Philadelphia Eagles	E
1946	6	6	46	John Ferraro	Green Bay Packers	T
1946	7	9	59	Bob Hendren	Washington Redskins	T
1946	8	9	69	George Callanan	Washington Redskins	B
1946	15	9	139	Harry Adelman	Washington Redskins	E
1946	18	5	165	Bob Morris	New York Giants	B
1946	19	6	176	Joe Bradford	Green Bay Packers	C
1946	21	9	199	John Pehar	Washington Redskins	T
1946	29	10	280	Jay Perrin	Cleveland Rams	T
1947	5	8	33	Gordon Gray	Los Angeles Rams	B
1947	6	4	39	Mike Garzoni	Washington Redskins	G
1947	16	6	141	Jim Callanan	Green Bay Packers	E
1947	17	8	153	Don Hardy	Los Angeles Rams	E
1948	9	2	67	Don Doll	Detroit Lions	B
1948	10	2	77	Paul Cleary	Detroit Lions	E
1948	21	2	187	Dean Dill	Detroit Lions	B
1948	24	1	216	Walt McCormick	New York Giants	C
1948	28	2	257	George Schutte	Detroit Lions	T
1949	13	7	128	Ed Henke	Washington Redskins	T
1949	20	7	198	Ollie Fletcher	Washington Redskins	E
1949	21	10	211	Lou Futrell	Philadelphia Eagles	B
1949	22	3	214	John Kordich	Green Bay Packers	B
1950	11	6	137	Jay Roundy	Los Angeles Rams	B
1950	12	9	153	Don Burke	San Francisco 49ers	B
1950	20	9	257	Jack Nix	San Francisco 49ers	E
1950	23	11	298	Jim Bird	Los Angeles Rams	T
1950	26	9	335	Jim Powers	San Francisco 49ers	B
1950	27	13	352	Bill Martin	Philadelphia Eagles	B
1950	30	9	387	Bob Stillwell	San Francisco 49ers	E
1951	10	8	118	Paul Salata	Pittsburgh Steelers	E
1951	11	3	126	Bill Jessup	San Francisco 49ers	E
1951	13	4	151	Volney Peters	Chicago Cardinals	T
1951	16	5	188	Hal Hatfield	Philadelphia Eagles	E
1951	26	1	304	Johnny Williams	Washington Redskins	B
1952	1	11	11	Frank Gifford	New York Giants	RB
1952	11	1	122	Pat Cannamela	New York Yanks	G
1952	16	12	193	Bob Hooks	Los Angeles Rams	E
1952	17	8	201	Al Baldock	San Francisco 49ers	E
1952	22	1	254	Dean Schneider	New York Yanks	B
1953	1	7	7	Al Carmichael	Green Bay Packers	B
1953	2	2	15	Jim Psaltis	Chicago Cardinals	B
1953	2	11	24	Rudy Bukich	Los Angeles Rams	QB
1953	4	12	49	Charlie Ane Jr.	Detroit Lions	T
1953	5	10	59	Bob Van Doren	Cleveland Browns	E
1953	6	1	62	Jim Sears	Baltimore Colts	B
1953	6	8	69	Bob Peviani	New York Giants	G
1953	12	10	143	Elmer Wilhoite	Cleveland Browns	G
1953	22	3	256	Ed Pucci	Washington Redskins	G
1953	26	3	304	Walt Ashcratt	Washington Redskins	T
1953	26	6	307	George Bozanic	Green Bay Packers	B
1953	27	11	324	Lou Welsh	Los Angeles Rams	C
1953	28	3	328	Bob Buckley	Washington Redskins	B
1953	29	8	345	Don Stillwell	San Francisco 49ers	E
1953	30	6	355	Al Barry	Green Bay Packers	G
1954	3	2	27	George Timberlake	Green Bay Packers	G
1954	3	7	32	Tom Nickoloff	Los Angeles Rams	E
1954	7	9	82	Charley Weeks	Los Angeles Rams	T
1954	11	10	131	John Skocko	San Francisco 49ers	E
1954	16	2	183	Des Koch	Green Bay Packers	B
1954	30	4	353	Jim Gibson	New York Giants	T
1955	2	1	14	Lindon Crow	Chicago Cardinals	B
1955	4	6	43	Ed Fouch	Los Angeles Rams	T
1955	5	1	50	Mario De Ra	Chicago Cardinals	T
1955	5	12	61	Aramis Dandoy	Cleveland Browns	B
1955	7	6	79	Frank Clayton	Los Angeles Rams	B
1955	25	8	297	Frank Pavich	Philadelphia Eagles	G
1955	29	3	340	Bing Bordier	Washington Redskins	E
1956	2	1	14	Leon Clarke	Los Angeles Rams	E
1956	7	12	85	Chuck Griffith	Cleveland Browns	E
1956	9	7	104	Gordy Duvall	Green Bay Packers	B
1957	1	2	2	Jon Arnett	Los Angeles Rams	B
1957	5	7	56	Karl Rubke	San Francisco 49ers	C
1957	5	8	57	Dick Enright	Los Angeles Rams	G
1957	8	2	87	George Belotti	Green Bay Packers	C
1957	27	1	314	Frank Hall	Philadelphia Eagles	B
1958	6	10	71	Henry Schmidt	San Francisco 49ers	T
1958	9	3	100	Mike Henry	Pittsburgh Steelers	T
1958	14	9	166	C. R. Roberts	New York Giants	B
1958	17	12	205	Walt Gurasich	Detroit Lions	G
1958	19	7	224	Dick Dorsey	Los Angeles Rams	E
1958	26	10	311	Hilliard Hill	San Francisco 49ers	E
1958	27	8	321	Dick Bronson	New York Giants	T
1959	4	5	41	Monte Clark	San Francisco 49ers	T
1959	18	7	211	John Seinturier	Pittsburgh Steelers	T
1959	26	3	303	Joe Chuha	Chicago Cardinals	C
1960	1	10	10	Ron Mix	Baltimore Colts	T
1960	6	11	71	Al Bansavage	Baltimore Colts	G
1960	7	9	81	John Wilkins	Philadelphia Eagles	T
1960	17	9	201	Jim Hanna	Chicago Bears	E
1960	20	9	237	Angelo Coia	Chicago Bears	B
1961	1	4	4	Marlin McKeever	Los Angeles Rams	LB
1961	4	11	53	Dan Ficca	Philadelphia Eagles	G
1961	10	14	140	Luther Hayes	Philadelphia Eagles	E
1961	13	4	172	Mike McKeever	Los Angeles Rams	G
1961	19	5	257	Ben Charles	Chicago Bears	QB
1962	3	4	32	Jim Bates	Chicago Bears	E
1962	5	12	68	Ben Wilson	Los Angeles Rams	RB
1962	6	10	80	Mike Bundra	Detroit Lions	T
1962	12	2	156	Marv Marinovich	Los Angeles Rams	T
1963	10	10	136	Bill Nelsen	Pittsburgh Steelers	QB
1963	15	9	205	Lynn Reade	Cleveland Browns	T
1964	1	5	5	Pete Beathard	Detroit Lions	QB
1964	2	5	19	Hal Bedsole	Minnesota Vikings	WR
1964	3	4	32	Willie Brown	Los Angeles Rams	DB
1964	18	3	241	Theo Viltz	Dallas Cowboys	DB
1965	4	6	48	Fred Hill	Philadelphia Eagles	WR
1965	4	11	53	Bob Svihus	Dallas Cowboys	T
1965	11	8	148	John Thomas	Minnesota Vikings	E
1965	15	1	197	Mike Giers	New York Giants	G
1965	17	9	233	Ed Blecksmith	Los Angeles Rams	B
1965	20	4	270	Craig Fertig	Pittsburgh Steelers	QB
1966	2	2	18	Mike Garrett	Los Angeles Rams	RB
1966	4	6	54	Rod Sherman	Baltimore Colts	WR
1966	10	11	151	Jeff Smith	New York Giants	LB
1966	13	13	198	Ed King	Green Bay Packers	LB
1966	14	11	211	Denis Moore	Detroit Lions	T
1966	19	2	277	Homer Williams	Los Angeles Rams	WR
1966	19	13	288	Dave Moton	Green Bay Packers	WR
1966	20	0	0	Mike Garrett	Kansas City Chiefs	RB
1967	4	9	89	Ray May	Pittsburgh Steelers	LB
1967	5	1	108	Don McCall	New Orleans Saints	RB
1967	5	15	122	Nate Shaw	Los Angeles Rams	DB
1967	10	8	245	Jerry Hayhoe	Detroit Lions	G
1967	13	9	324	Jim Homan	Pittsburgh Steelers	G
1968	1	1	1	Ron Yary	Minnesota Vikings	T
1968	1	10	10	Mike Taylor	Pittsburgh Steelers	T
1968	1	14	14	Tim Rossovich	Philadelphia Eagles	DE
1968	1	16	16	Mike Hull	Chicago Bears	RB
1968	1	24	24	Earl McCullouch	Detroit Lions	WR
1968	3	13	68	Adrian Young	Philadelphia Eagles	LB
1968	4	11	94	Dennis Crane	Washington Redskins	DT
1968	4	18	101	Gary Magner	New York Jets	DT
1968	11	25	298	Ralph Oliver	Oakland Raiders	LB
1968	17	3	438	Steve Grady	Denver Broncos	RB
1968	17	4	439	Jim Ferguson	New Orleans Saints	LB
1969	1	1	1	O. J. Simpson	Buffalo Bills	RB
1969	1	21	21	Bob Klein	Los Angeles Rams	TE
1969	5	12	116	Bill Hayhoe	Green Bay Packers	DT
1969	6	8	138	Bob Miller	New Orleans Saints	TE
1969	8	7	189	Jim Lawrence	New Orleans Saints	WR
1969	12	16	302	Jack O'Malley	San Francisco 49ers	T
1969	12	25	311	Mike Battle	New York Jets	DB
1969	13	3	320	Wilson Bowie	Detroit Lions	RB
1970	1	5	5	Al Cowlings	Buffalo Bills	DE
1970	1	26	26	Sid Smith	Kansas City Chiefs	T
1970	5	9	113	Gary McArthur	San Francisco 49ers	T
1970	6	8	138	Sandy Durko	Cincinnati Bengals	DB
1970	6	19	149	Tony Terry	Detroit Lions	DT
1970	7	13	169	Gary Orcutt	Atlanta Falcons	WR
1970	8	19	201	Mike Holmgren	St. Louis Cardinals	QB
1970	13	2	314	Jim Gunn	Chicago Bears	DB
1970	17	22	438	Don Crenshaw	Los Angeles Rams	DB
1971	1	12	12	Marv Montgomery	Denver Broncos	T
1971	1	25	25	Tody Smith	Dallas Cowboys	DE
1971	2	22	48	Charlie Weaver	Detroit Lions	LB
1971	3	3	55	Sam Dickerson	San Francisco 49ers	WR
1971	4	8	86	Gerry Mullins	Pittsburgh Steelers	TE
1971	4	19	97	Clarence Davis	Oakland Raiders	RB
1971	6	19	149	Greg Slough	Oakland Raiders	LB
1971	6	22	152	Herman Franklin	Detroit Lions	WR
1971	7	4	160	Bob Chandler	Buffalo Bills	WR
1971	14	18	356	Charlie Evans	New York Giants	RB
1972	2	5	31	Willie Hall	New Orleans Saints	LB
1972	2	17	43	John Vella	Oakland Raiders	T
1972	7	20	176	Alonzo Thomas	Oakland Raiders	DB
1972	17	4	420	Lou Harris	Denver Broncos	RB
1972	17	6	422	Kent Carter	St. Louis Cardinals	LB
1972	17	15	431	Bill Holland	St. Louis Cardinals	RB
1973	1	6	6	Charle Young	Philadelphia Eagles	TE
1973	1	11	11	Sam Cunningham	New England Patriots	RB
1973	1	22	22	Pete Adams	Cleveland Browns	T
1973	2	6	32	Jeff Winans	Buffalo Bills	DT
1973	4	4	82	Allen Gallagher	New England Patriots	T
1973	5	1	105	Edesel Garrison	Houston Oilers	WR
1973	7	10	166	John Grant	Denver Broncos	DE
1973	8	23	205	Mike Rae	Oakland Raiders	QB
1973	9	26	234	Karl Lorch	Miami Dolphins	DT
1973	17	23	439	Michael Ryal	Oakland Raiders	G
1974	1	21	21	Lynn Swann	Pittsburgh Steelers	WR
1974	1	25	25	Steve Riley	Minnesota Vikings	T
1974	4	10	88	Rod McNeill	New Orleans Saints	RB
1974	6	24	154	Booker Brown	Houston Oilers	G
1974	8	12	194	Monte Doris	Green Bay Packers	LB
1974	9	8	216	Manfred Moore	San Francisco 49ers	RB
1974	12	2	288	Jimmy Sims	New York Giants	DB
1974	12	11	297	Artimus Parker	Philadelphia Eagles	DB
1974	15	2	366	Charles Anthony	San Diego Chargers	LB
1975	2	11	37	Anthony Davis	New York Jets	RB
1975	2	19	45	Charles Phillips	Oakland Raiders	DB
1975	2	21	47	Bill Bain	Green Bay Packers	G
1975	2	26	52	Art Riley	Minnesota Vikings	DT
1975	3	16	68	Richard Wood	New York Jets	LB
1975	4	8	86	Allen Carter	New England Patriots	RB
1975	7	2	158	Jim O'Bradovich	New York Giants	TE
1975	7	20	176	Pat Haden	Los Angeles Rams	QB
1975	10	8	242	Otha Bradley	San Diego Chargers	DT
1975	11	16	276	Marvin Cobb	Cincinnati Bengals	DB
1975	13	10	322	Dale Mitchell	San Francisco 49ers	LB
1975	16	3	393	Steve Knutson	Atlanta Falcons	T
1975	16	4	394	John McKay Jr.	Cleveland Browns	WR
1975	16	10	400	Bob McCaffrey	Green Bay Packers	C
1976	3	9	69	Danny Reece	Cincinnati Bengals	DB
1976	8	2	211	Joe Davis	New York Jets	G
1976	12	9	328	Melvin Jackson	Green Bay Packers	G
1976	16	23	454	Doug Hogan	Oakland Raiders	DB
1977	1	1	1	Ricky Bell	Tampa Bay Buccaneers	RB
1977	1	4	4	Marvin Powell	New York Jets	T
1977	1	5	5	Gary Jeter	New York Giants	DT
1977	2	1	29	Dave Lewis	Tampa Bay Buccaneers	LB
1977	5	8	120	Shelton Diggs	Atlanta Falcons	WR
1977	5	18	130	Donnie Hickman	Los Angeles Rams	G
1977	6	1	140	Vince Evans	Chicago Bears	QB
1977	6	2	141	Mike Burns	San Francisco 49ers	DB
1977	7	6	173	Ken Randle	Cleveland Browns	WR
1977	7	14	181	Ron Bush	San Diego Chargers	DB
1977	8	21	216	Eric Williams	St. Louis Cardinals	LB
1977	8	27	222	Clint Strozier	Minnesota Vikings	DB
1977	11	8	287	Dave Farmer	Atlanta Falcons	RB
1977	12	10	317	Rod Martin	Oakland Raiders	LB
1978	1	12	12	Clay Matthews	Cleveland Browns	LB
1978	2	27	55	Bill Gay	Denver Broncos	TE
1978	5	21	131	Rob Hertel	Cincinnati Bengals	QB
1978	7	2	168	Ricky Odom	Kansas City Chiefs	DB
1978	7	5	171	Mario Celotto	Buffalo Bills	LB
1978	8	21	215	Mosi Tatupu	New England Patriots	RB
1978	11	20	298	Walt Underwood	Chicago Bears	DE
1978	11	28	306	Dennis Thurman	Dallas Cowboys	DB
1978	12	16	322	John Schuhmacher	Houston Oilers	G
1978s	12	0	0	Rod Connors	San Francisco 49ers	RB
1979	2	21	49	Pat Howell	Atlanta Falcons	G
1979	4	18	100	Lynn Cain	Atlanta Falcons	RB
1979	4	28	110	Calvin Sweeney	Pittsburgh Steelers	WR
1979	5	5	115	Larry Braziel	Baltimore Colts	DB
1979	5	14	124	Rich Dimler	Cleveland Browns	DT
1979	6	18	155	Tim Lavender	Dallas Cowboys	DB
1979	8	22	214	Carter Hartwig	Houston Oilers	DB
1979	9	27	247	Garry Cobb	Dallas Cowboys	LB
1980	1	3	3	Anthony Muñoz	Cincinnati Bengals	T
1980	1	11	11	Brad Budde	Kansas City Chiefs	G
1980	1	27	27	Charles White	Cleveland Browns	RB
1980	2	17	45	Larry McGrew	New England Patriots	LB
1980	3	8	64	Myron Lapka	New York Giants	DT
1980	4	5	88	Ray Butler	Baltimore Colts	WR
1980	4	9	92	Dennis Johnson	Minnesota Vikings	LB
1980	4	26	109	Paul McDonald	Cleveland Browns	QB
1980	6	6	144	Chris Foote	Baltimore Colts	C
1980s	9	0	0	Billy Mullins	San Diego Chargers	WR
1981	1	8	8	Ronnie Lott	San Francisco 49ers	DB
1981	1	11	11	Keith Van Horne	Chicago Bears	T
1981	1	15	15	Dennis Smith	Denver Broncos	DB
1981	3	15	71	Hoby Brenner	New Orleans Saints	TE
1981	7	1	167	Kevin Williams	New Orleans Saints	WR
1981	7	11	177	Jeff Fisher	Chicago Bears	DB
1981	7	15	181	Steve Busick	Denver Broncos	LB
1981	9	18	239	James Hunter	Pittsburgh Steelers	T
1981	12	11	315	Eric Scoggins	Baltimore Colts	LB
1982	1	3	3	Chip Banks	Cleveland Browns	LB
1982	1	10	10	Marcus Allen	Los Angeles Raiders	RB
1982	1	24	24	Roy Foster	Miami Dolphins	G
1982	9	22	245	Dennis Edwards	Buffalo Bills	DT
1982	10	6	257	Joe Turner	Chicago Bears	DB
1983	1	9	9	Bruce Matthews	Houston Oilers	G
1983	1	19	19	Joey Browner	Minnesota Vikings	DB
1983	1	26	26	Don Mosebar	Los Angeles Raiders	T
1983	3	1	57	George Achica	Baltimore Colts	DT
1983	4	10	94	August Curley	Detroit Lions	LB
1983	4	15	99	Kelly Thomas	Tampa Bay Buccaneers	T
1983	5	5	117	Riki Ellison	San Francisco 49ers	LB
1983	5	8	120	Byron Darby	Philadelphia Eagles	DT
1983	7	3	171	Jeff Simmons	Los Angeles Rams	WR
1983	8	4	200	Troy West	Los Angeles Rams	DB
1983	12	20	327	John Harvey	Green Bay Packers	LB
1984	2	2	30	Keith Browner	Tampa Bay Buccaneers	LB
1984	3	25	81	Fred Cornwell	Dallas Cowboys	TE
1984	6	15	155	Tony Slaton	Buffalo Bills	C
1984	11	13	293	Michael Harper	Los Angeles Rams	RB
1984u	2	26	54	Malcolm Moore	Dallas Cowboys	WR
1985	1	5	5	Duane Bickett	Indianapolis Colts	LB
1985	1	7	7	Ken Ruettgers	Green Bay Packers	T
1985	3	12	68	Jack Del Rio	New Orleans Saints	LB
1985	5	12	124	Brian Luft	New York Jets	DT
1985	9	5	229	Mark Boyer	Indianapolis Colts	TE
1986	1	13	13	James Fitzpatrick	San Diego Chargers	T
1986	5	15	125	Matt Koart	Green Bay Packers	DT
1986	5	23	133	Matt Johnson	San Diego Chargers	DB
1986	5	24	134	Tony Colorito	Denver Broncos	DT
1986	9	15	236	Brent Moore	Green Bay Packers	DT
1986	9	22	243	Elbert Watts	Los Angeles Rams	DB
1986	9	25	246	Zeph Lee	Los Angeles Raiders	RB
1986	10	10	259	Joseph D. Cormier	Minnesota Vikings	WR
1986	10	24	273	Garrett Breeland	Los Angeles Rams	LB
1987	2	6	34	Tim McDonald	Phoenix Cardinals	DB
1987	2	9	37	Jeff Bregel	San Francisco 49ers	G
1987	2	25	53	Lou Brock Jr.	San Diego Chargers	DB
1987	8	9	204	Ron Brown	San Diego Chargers	LB
1988	1	8	8	Dave Cadigan	New York Jets	T
1988	2	1	28	Marcus Cotton	Atlanta Falcons	LB
1989	4	26	110	Erik Affholter	Washington Redskins	WR
1989	6	2	141	Rodney Peete	Detroit Lions	QB
1989	7	26	193	Chris Hale	Buffalo Bills	DB
1989	8	13	208	Paul Green	Denver Broncos	TE
1989	12	25	332	Derrell Marshall	Buffalo Bills	T
1990	1	5	5	Junior Seau	San Diego Chargers	LB
1990	1	6	6	Mark Carrier	Chicago Bears	DB
1990	2	10	35	Dan Owens	Detroit Lions	DT
1990	3	8	61	Tim Ryan	Chicago Bears	DT
1990	4	13	94	Bill Schultz	Indianapolis Colts	G
1990	5	28	137	Leroy Holt	Miami Dolphins	RB
1990	7	13	178	Scott Galbraith	Cleveland Browns	TE
1990	7	26	191	Aaron Emanuel	New York Giants	RB
1990	8	26	219	Brad Leggett	Denver Broncos	C
1990	10	19	267	Ernest Spears	New Orleans Saints	DB
1991	1	11	11	Pat Harlow	New England Patriots	T
1991	1	24	24	Todd Marinovich	Los Angeles Raiders	QB
1991	3	21	76	Ricky Ervins	Washington Redskins	RB
1991	5	18	129	Gary Wellman	Houston Oilers	WR
1991	7	19	186	Mark Tucker	Atlanta Falcons	C
1991	9	4	227	Don Gibson	Denver Broncos	DT
1991	10	10	260	Pat O'Hara	Tampa Bay Buccaneers	QB
1991	11	15	293	Scott Ross	New Orleans Saints	LB
1992	2	14	42	Kurt Barber	New York Jets	LB
1992	7	28	196	Calvin Holmes	Washington Redskins	DB
1992	8	8	204	Scott Lockwood	New England Patriots	RB
1992	10	15	267	Raoul Spears	Miami Dolphins	RB
1992	11	4	284	Mazio Royster	Tampa Bay Buccaneers	RB
1993	1	7	7	Curtis Conway	Chicago Bears	WR
1993	4	18	102	Travis Hannah	Houston Oilers	WR
1993	8	16	212	Lamont Hollinquest	Washington Redskins	LB
1994	1	4	4	Willie McGinest	New England Patriots	DE
1994	1	21	21	Johnnie Morton	Detroit Lions	WR
1994	2	30	59	Jason Sehorn	New York Giants	DB
1994	4	3	106	Bradford Banta	Indianapolis Colts	TE
1995	1	2	2	Tony Boselli	Jacksonville Jaguars	T
1995	3	9	73	Brian Williams	Green Bay Packers	LB
1995	4	1	99	Rob Johnson	Jacksonville Jaguars	QB
1995	5	32	166	Edward Hervey	Dallas Cowboys	WR
1995	6	23	194	Jeff Kopp	Miami Dolphins	LB
1995	7	39	247	Cole Ford	Pittsburgh Steelers	K
1996	1	1	1	Keyshawn Johnson	New York Jets	WR
1996	1	27	27	John Michels	Green Bay Packers	T
1996	2	16	46	Israel Ifeanyi	San Francisco 49ers	DE
1996	3	3	64	Johnny McWilliams	Arizona Cardinals	TE
1996	4	11	106	Norberto Garrido	Carolina Panthers	G
1996	7	31	240	Kyle Wachholtz	Green Bay Packers	QB
1997	1	2	2	Darrell Russell	Oakland Raiders	DT
1997	2	8	38	John Allred	Chicago Bears	TE
1997	7	7	208	Matt Keneley	New York Giants	DT
1997	7	12	213	Chris Miller	Green Bay Packers	WR
1998	2	15	45	Brian Kelly	Tampa Bay Buccaneers	DB
1999	1	9	9	Chris Claiborne	Detroit Lions	LB
1999	3	1	62	Daylon McCutcheon	Cleveland Browns	DB
1999	4	13	108	Larry Parker	Kansas City Chiefs	WR
1999	6	15	184	Rashard Cook	Chicago Bears	DB
1999	7	12	218	Billy Miller	Denver Broncos	WR
2000	1	29	29	R. Jay Soward	Jacksonville Jaguars	WR
2000	2	6	37	Travis Claridge	Atlanta Falcons	G
2000	5	14	143	Windrell Hayes	New York Jets	WR
2000	5	37	166	Chad Morton	New Orleans Saints	RB
2000	6	27	193	David Gibson	Tampa Bay Buccaneers	DB
2001	4	27	122	Markus Steele	Dallas Cowboys	LB
2001	5	8	139	Zeke Moreno	San Diego Chargers	LB
2001	7	21	221	Ennis Davis	New Orleans Saints	DT
2002	3	20	85	Kris Richard	Seattle Seahawks	DB
2002	6	3	175	Chris Cash	Detroit Lions	DB
2003	1	1	1	Carson Palmer	Cincinnati Bengals	QB
2003	1	16	16	Troy Polamalu	Pittsburgh Steelers	DB
2003	3	32	96	Justin Fargas	Oakland Raiders	RB
2003	6	30	203	Kareem Kelly	New Orleans Saints	WR
2003	7	4	218	Malaefou MacKenzie	Jacksonville Jaguars	RB
2004	1	20	20	Kenechi Udeze	Minnesota Vikings	DE
2004	2	20	52	Jacob Rogers	Dallas Cowboys	T
2004	2	30	62	Keary Colbert	Carolina Panthers	WR
2004	4	6	102	Will Poole	Miami Dolphins	DB
2005	1	10	10	Mike Williams	Detroit Lions	WR
2005	1	31	31	Mike Patterson	Philadelphia Eagles	DT
2005	2	5	37	Shaun Cody	Detroit Lions	DT
2005	2	13	45	Lofa Tatupu	Seattle Seahawks	LB
2005	7	16	230	Matt Cassel	New England Patriots	QB
2005s	5	0	0	Manuel Wright	Miami Dolphins	DT
2006	1	2	2	Reggie Bush	New Orleans Saints	RB
2006	1	10	10	Matt Leinart	Arizona Cardinals	QB
2006	2	7	39	Winston Justice	Philadelphia Eagles	T
2006	2	9	41	Taitusi Lutui	Arizona Cardinals	G
2006	2	13	45	LenDale White	Tennessee Titans	RB
2006	3	27	91	Frostee Rucker	Cincinnati Bengals	DE
2006	3	29	93	Dominique Byrd	St. Louis Rams	TE
2006	4	4	101	Darnell Bing	Oakland Raiders	DB
2006	5	31	163	David Kirtman	Seattle Seahawks	RB
2006	6	35	204	LaJuan Ramsey	Philadelphia Eagles	DT
2006	7	9	217	Fred Matua	Detroit Lions	G
2007	2	13	45	Dwayne Jarrett	Carolina Panthers	WR
2007	2	19	51	Steve Smith	New York Giants	WR
2007	2	27	59	Ryan Kalil	Carolina Panthers	C
2007	5	6	143	Dallas Sartz	Washington Redskins	LB
2007	7	1	211	Oscar Lua	New England Patriots	LB
2008	1	7	7	Sedrick Ellis	New Orleans Saints	DT
2008	1	9	9	Keith Rivers	Cincinnati Bengals	LB
2008	1	21	21	Sam Baker	Atlanta Falcons	T
2008	1	28	28	Lawrence Jackson	Seattle Seahawks	DE
2008	2	8	39	Chilo Rachal	San Francisco 49ers	G
2008	2	17	48	Fred Davis	Washington Redskins	TE
2008	2	32	63	Terrell Thomas	New York Giants	DB
2008	5	2	137	John David Booty	Minnesota Vikings	QB
2008	5	20	155	Thomas Williams	Jacksonville Jaguars	LB
2008	7	6	213	Chauncey Washington	Jacksonville Jaguars	RB
2009	1	5	5	Mark Sanchez	New York Jets	QB
2009	1	15	15	Brian Cushing	Houston Texans	LB
2009	1	26	26	Clay Matthews III	Green Bay Packers	LB
2009	2	6	38	Rey Maualuga	Cincinnati Bengals	LB
2009	2	24	56	Fili Moala	Indianapolis Colts	DT
2009	3	23	87	Patrick Turner	Miami Dolphins	WR
2009	4	4	104	Kaluka Maiava	Cleveland Browns	LB
2009	4	17	117	Kyle Moore	Tampa Bay Buccaneers	DE
2009	5	36	172	David Buehler	Dallas Cowboys	K
2009	6	10	183	Cary Harris	Buffalo Bills	DB
2009	6	16	189	Kevin Ellison	San Diego Chargers	DB
2010	2	17	49	Taylor Mays	San Francisco 49ers	DB
2010	2	32	64	Charles Brown	New Orleans Saints	T
2010	3	13	77	Damian Williams	Tennessee Titans	WR
2010	3	30	94	Kevin Thomas	Indianapolis Colts	DB
2010	4	2	100	Everson Griffen	Minnesota Vikings	DE
2010	4	14	112	Joe McKnight	New York Jets	RB
2010	6	16	185	Anthony McCoy	Seattle Seahawks	TE
2011	1	9	9	Tyron Smith	Dallas Cowboys	T
2011	3	13	77	Jurrell Casey	Tennessee Titans	DT
2011	3	25	89	Shareece Wright	San Diego Chargers	DB
2011	4	5	102	Jordan Cameron	Cleveland Browns	TE
2011	6	17	182	Ronald Johnson	San Francisco 49ers	WR
2011	6	22	187	Allen Bradford	Tampa Bay Buccaneers	RB
2011	7	37	240	Stanley Havili	Philadelphia Eagles	RB
2011	7	38	241	David Ausberry	Oakland Raiders	WR
2011	7	39	242	Malcolm Smith	Seattle Seahawks	LB
2012	1	4	4	Matt Kalil	Minnesota Vikings	T
2012	1	28	28	Nick Perry	Green Bay Packers	DE
2012	4	33	128	Rhett Ellison	Minnesota Vikings	TE
2013	2	9	41	Robert Woods	Buffalo Bills	WR
2013	3	9	71	T. J. McDonald	St. Louis Rams	DB
2013	4	1	98	Matt Barkley	Philadelphia Eagles	QB
2013	4	24	121	Khaled Holmes	Indianapolis Colts	C
2014	2	7	39	Marqise Lee	Jacksonville Jaguars	WR
2014	3	6	70	Marcus Martin	San Francisco 49ers	C
2014	5	34	174	Devon Kennard	New York Giants	LB
2015	1	6	6	Leonard Williams	New York Jets	DE
2015	1	20	20	Nelson Agholor	Philadelphia Eagles	WR
2015	4	21	120	Josh Shaw	Cincinnati Bengals	DB
2015	4	26	125	Javorius Allen	Baltimore Ravens	RB
2015	6	22	198	Hayes Pullard	Cleveland Browns	LB
2015	7	2	219	Randall Telfer	Cleveland Browns	TE
2016	2	22	53	Su'a Cravens	Washington Redskins	LB
2016	3	3	66	Max Tuerk	San Diego Chargers	C
2016	3	30	93	Cody Kessler	Cleveland Browns	QB
2016	6	43	218	Kevon Seymour	Buffalo Bills	DB
2017	1	18	18	Adoree' Jackson	Tennessee Titans	DB
2017	2	30	62	JuJu Smith-Schuster	Pittsburgh Steelers	WR
2017	4	30	137	Zach Banner	Indianapolis Colts	T
2017	6	34	218	Leon McQuay III	Kansas City Chiefs	DB
2017	7	5	223	Stevie Tu'ikolovatu	Tampa Bay Buccaneers	DT
2018	1	3	3	Sam Darnold	New York Jets	QB
2018	2	6	38	Ronald Jones	Tampa Bay Buccaneers	RB
2018	2	16	48	Uchenna Nwosu	Los Angeles Chargers	LB
2018	3	15	79	Rasheem Green	Seattle Seahawks	DE
2019	3	28	92	Chuma Edoga	New York Jets	T
2019	4	25	127	Iman Marshall	Baltimore Ravens	DB
2019	5	6	144	Marvell Tell	Indianapolis Colts	DB
2019	5	24	162	Cameron Smith	Minnesota Vikings	LB
2020	1	18	18	Austin Jackson	Miami Dolphins	T
2020	2	2	34	Michael Pittman Jr.	Indianapolis Colts	WR
2021	1	14	14	Alijah Vera-Tucker	New York Jets	G
2021	4	1	106	Jay Tufele	Jacksonville Jaguars	DT
2021	4	7	112	Amon-Ra St. Brown	Detroit Lions	WR
2021	5	36	180	Talanoa Hufanga	San Francisco 49ers	DB
2021	6	5	189	Marlon Tuipulotu	Philadelphia Eagles	DT
2022	1	8	8	Drake London	Atlanta Falcons	WR
2022	2	29	61	Drake Jackson	San Francisco 49ers	DE
2022	6	21	201	Keaontay Ingram	Arizona Cardinals	RB
2023	1	23	23	Jordan Addison	Minnesota Vikings	WR
2023	2	23	54	Tuli Tuipulotu	Los Angeles Chargers	DE
2023	3	39	102	Mekhi Blackmon	Minnesota Vikings	DB
2023	7	12	229	Andrew Vorhees	Baltimore Ravens	G
2024	1	1	1	Caleb Williams	Chicago Bears	QB
2024	3	14	104	Calen Bullock	Houston Texans	DB
2024	3	24	88	MarShawn Lloyd	Green Bay Packers	RB
2024	6	39	215	Jarrett Kingston	San Francisco 49ers	G
2024	7	5	225	Brenden Rice	Los Angeles Chargers	WR
2024	7	18	238	Solomon Byrd	Houston Texans	DE
2024	7	21	241	Tahj Washington	Miami Dolphins	WR
2025	3	33	97	Jaylin Smith	Houston Texans	CB
2025	4	14	116	Woody Marks	Houston Texans	RB
2025	7	5	221	Jonah Monheim	Jacksonville Jaguars	C
2026	1	20	20	Makai Lemon	Philadelphia Eagles	WR
2026	3	16	80	Ja'Kobi Lane	Baltimore Ravens	WR
2026	5	1	141	Kamari Ramsey	Houston Texans	S

== Notes ==
- Manuel Wright was drafted in the 2005 NFL Supplemental Draft.
- Malcolm Moore was drafted in the 1984 NFL Supplemental Draft.

== Notable undrafted players ==
Note: No drafts held before 1920

Year	Player	Position	Debut Team	Notes
1934	Homer Griffith	TB	Chicago Cardinals	—
1960	Willie Wood	CB	Green Bay Packers	—
1961	Jerry Traynham	K	Denver Broncos	—
1962	Pat Shea	G	San Diego Chargers	—
1962	Lloyd Winston	RB	San Francisco 49ers	—
1965	Mac Byrd	LB	Los Angeles Rams	—
1965	Steve Heckard	WR	Los Angeles Rams	—
1966	Chuck Arrobio	G	Minnesota Vikings	—
1966	Jim Vellone	G	Minnesota Vikings	—
1968	Dave Washington	TE	Denver Broncos	—
1971	Greg Wojcik	DT	Los Angeles Rams	—
1976	Greg Marderian	DT	Atlanta Falcons	—
1977	Glen Walker	P	Los Angeles Rams	—
1978	Joe Shipp	TE	Buffalo Bills	—
1980	Rob Preston	QB	Kansas City Chiefs	—
1983	James McDonlad	TE	Los Angeles Rams	—
1983	Mike McDonlad	LB	Los Angeles Rams	—
1983	Scott Tinsley	QB	Los Angeles Rams	—
1984	John Kamana	RB	Los Angeles Rams	—
1984	Todd Spencer	RB	Pittsburgh Steelers	—
1985	Tommy Haynes	DB	Dallas Cowboys	—
1985	Darrel Hopper	DB	San Diego Chargers	—
1985	Steve Jordan	K	San Francisco 49ers	—
1986	Sean Salisbury	QB	Seattle Seahawks	—
1987	Sam Anno	LB	Los Angeles Rams	—
1987	Tom Cox	T	Los Angeles Rams	—
1987	Neil Hope	LB	Los Angeles Rams	—
1987	Joe Murray	G	Los Angeles Rams	—
1987	Dave Purling	DT	Los Angeles Rams	—
1987	Junior Thurman	DB	New Orleans Saints	—
1990	John Jackson	WR	Phoenix Cardinals	—
1992	Derrick Deese	G	San Francisco 49ers	Super Bowl Champion (XXIX)
1992	Marc Raab	LS	Washington Redskins	—
1993	Wes Bender	RB	Kansas City Chiefs	—
1993	Matt Willig	T	New York Jets	Super Bowl Champion (XXXIV)
1994	Joel Crisman	T	Tampa Bay Buccaneers	—
1994	Deon Strother	RB	Denver Broncos	—
1996	Scott Fields	LB	Atlanta Falcons	—
1996	Mike Salmon	DB	Buffalo Bills	—
1997	Sammy Knight	S	New Orleans Saints	—
1999	Marvin Powell	FB	New Orleans Saints	—
2001	Ifeanyi Ohalete	CB	Washington Redskins	—
2002	Kori Dickerson	TE	Philadelphia Eagles	—
2002	Frank Strong	LB	San Francisco 49ers	—
2003	Grant Mattos	WR	San Diego Chargers	—
2003	Sultan McCullough	RB	Washington Redskins	—
2004	Marcell Allmond	CB	Baltimore Ravens	—
2004	Norm Katnik	C	San Francisco 49ers	—
2005	Matt Grootegoed	LB	Detroit Lions	—
2005	Gregg Guenther	TE	Tennessee Titans	—
2005	Alex Holmes	TE	Miami Dolphins	—
2005	Ryan Killeen	PK	Detroit Lions	—
2005	Lee Webb	RB	Jacksonville Jaguars	—
2006	Will Buchanon	WR	Oakland Raiders	—
2006	Tom Malone	P	San Francisco 49ers	—
2007	Chris McFoy	WR	Oakland Raiders	—
2007	Ryan Powdrell	FB	Green Bay Packers	—
2007	Kyle Williams	OT	Seattle Seahawks	—
2008	Matt Spanos	G	Miami Dolphins	—
2010	Jeff Byers	C	Seattle Seahawks	—
2010	Alex Parsons	G	Oakland Raiders	—
2011	Mike Morgan	LB	Seattle Seahawks	Super Bowl Champion (XLVIII)
2012	DaJohn Harris	DT	Tennessee Titans	—
2013	Nickell Robey-Coleman	CB	Buffalo Bills	—
2013	Jawanza Starling	SS	Houston Texans	—
2013	Christian Tupou	DT	Chicago Bears	—
2014	Dion Bailey	FS	Seattle Seahawks	—
2014	Silas Redd	RB	Washington Redskins	—
2014	George Uko	DT	Tampa Bay Buccaneers	—
2015	George Farmer	RB	Dallas Cowboys	—
2015	J. R. Tavai	LB	Tennessee Titans	—
2016	Tre Madden	RB	Seattle Seahawks	—
2016	Claude Pelon	DE	New York Jets	—
2016	Antwaun Woods	DT	Tennessee Titans	—
2017	Justin Davis	RB	Los Angeles Rams	—
2017	Taylor McNamara	TE	Cleveland Browns	—
2017	Jordan Simmons	G	Oakland Raiders	—
2017	Chad Wheeler	OT	New York Giants	—
2017	Isaac Whitney	WR	Oakland Raiders	—
2018	Deontay Burnett	WR	Tennessee Titans	—
2018	Nico Falah	C	Tennessee Titans	—
2018	Steve Mitchell	WR	Los Angeles Rams	—
2019	Porter Gustin	DE	New Orleans Saints	—
2019	Ajene Harris	CB	Philadelphia Eagles	—
2019	Isaiah Langley	CB	Oakland Raiders	—
2021	Olaijah Griffin	CB	Buffalo Bills	—
2021	Tyler Vaughns	WR	Indianapolis Colts	—
2022	Kana'i Mauga	LB	Denver Broncos	—
2022	Isaiah Pola-Mao	S	Las Vegas Raiders	—
2023	Terrell Bynum	WR	Los Angeles Chargers	—
2023	Travis Dye	RB	New York Jets	—
2023	Brandon Pili	DL	Miami Dolphins	—
2024	Justin Dedich	C	Los Angeles Rams	—
2024	Austin Jones	RB	Washington Commanders	—
2024	Shane Lee	LB	Los Angeles Chargers	—
2024	Christian Roland-Wallace	CB	Kansas City Chiefs	—
2025	Eddie Czaplicki	P	Kansas City Chiefs	—
2025	John Humphrey	CB	Las Vegas Raiders	—
2025	Easton Mascarenas-Arnold	LB	Cleveland Browns	—
2025	Greedy Vance Jr.	CB	Las Vegas Raiders	—
