= Tom Greenlee =

American football player (born 1945)

Profile
- Position: Defensive back

Personal information
- Born: May 11, 1945 (age 81); Seattle, Washington, U.S.
- Listed height: 6 ft 0 in (1.83 m)
- Listed weight: 195 lb (88 kg)

Career information
- High school: Franklin (Seattle, Washington)
- College: Washington
- NFL draft: 1967: 4th round, 95th overall pick

Awards and highlights
- Consensus All-American (1966); 2× First-team All-Pac-8 (1965, 1966)
- Stats at CFL.ca

Tom Greenlee (born May 11, 1945) is an American former consensus All-American defensive end at the University of Washington, selected in the fourth round by the Chicago Bears as a defensive back in the 1967 NFL/AFL draft.

== Early life ==
Greenlee attended Franklin High School where he was an All-Metro defensive back.

== College career ==
Greenlee played for the Washington Huskies from 1964 to 1966, where he was a team captain in 1966 for coach Jim Owens. He was a two-time All-AAWU and All-Coast selection. Following his playing Washington career, Greenlee played in both the East–West Shrine Game and Hula Bowl.

Greenlee was inducted into the Husky Hall of Fame in 1987.
