= John Didion =

American football player (1947–2013)

No. 51
- Positions: Center, Linebacker

Personal information
- Born: October 24, 1947; Woodland, California, U.S.
- Died: December 10, 2013 (aged 66); Portland, Oregon, U.S.
- Listed height: 6 ft 4 in (1.93 m)
- Listed weight: 245 lb (111 kg)

Career information
- High school: Woodland
- College: Oregon State (1965-1968)
- NFL draft: 1969: 7th round, 173rd overall pick

Career history
- Washington Redskins (1969–1970); New Orleans Saints (1971–1974); Chicago Bears (1975)*
- * Offseason or practice squad member only

Awards and highlights
- Unanimous All-American (1968); Second-team All-American (1967); 2× First-team All-Pac-8 (1967, 1968)

Career NFL statistics
- Games played: 80
- Games started: 56
- Stats at Pro Football Reference

John Lawrence Didion (October 24, 1947 – December 10, 2013) was an American football player, a center in the National Football League (NFL) for the Washington Redskins and New Orleans Saints from 1969 to 1974.

== Early life ==
Born and raised in Woodland, California, Didion played college football at Oregon State University under head coach Dee Andros and was a consensus All-American.

== NFL career ==
Selected in the seventh round of the 1969 NFL/AFL draft, Didion played his first two seasons in the NFL for the Redskins under head coaches Vince Lombardi and Bill Austin. He was traded in January 1971 by new head coach George Allen to the Saints in the deal which brought quarterback Billy Kilmer to the "Over the Hill Gang."

== After football ==
From 1998 to 2010, Didion was the sheriff of Pacific County, Washington.

Didion died at age 66 in Portland, Oregon.
