= George Buehler =

American football player (born 1947)

No. 64, 62
- Position: Guard

Personal information
- Born: August 10, 1947 (age 79); Whittier, California, U.S.
- Listed height: 6 ft 2 in (1.88 m)
- Listed weight: 260 lb (118 kg)

Career information
- High school: Whittier
- College: Stanford (1965-1968)
- NFL draft: 1969: 2nd round, 50th overall pick

Career history
- Oakland Raiders (1969-1978); Cleveland Browns (1978-1979)

Awards and highlights
- Super Bowl champion (XI); First-team All-Pac-8 (1967); Second-team All-Pac-8 (1968)

Career NFL/AFL statistics
- Games played: 137
- Games started: 106
- Fumble recoveries: 8
- Stats at Pro Football Reference

George Siegrist Buehler Jr. (born August 10, 1947) is an American former professional football player who was an offensive lineman in the American Football League (AFL) and the National Football League (NFL). He played college football for the Stanford Cardinal.

== Early life ==
Buehler played for Whittier High School and was the CIF Southern Section Player of the Year in 1964. While attending Whittier High George also competed on the Wrestling and Track Teams. In Track was a very successful Shot Putter/Discus Thrower, and, on the Wrestling Team, he was a four-year Varsity Heavyweight Champion, and, was the CIF Southern Section Heavyweight Champion in both his Jr.(1964) and Senior year 1965. See CIF SS Record Sports Information Records

== College career ==
Buehler played college football at Stanford University.

== Professional career ==
George Buehler played for the Oakland Raiders from 1969 to 1978. From 1969 to 1970, Buehler was a replacement. He became a starter at right offensive guard for the Raiders from 1971 to 1977, but was used sparingly in 1978, replaced by Mickey Marvin, and ending his career with the Cleveland Browns in 1978 and 1979. He was part of a particularly strong offensive line during the 1976 season, featuring interior linemates Dave Dalby at center and Gene Upshaw at left guard. In the 1976 AFC championship game of the 1976–77 NFL playoffs, the Raiders beat the Pittsburgh Steelers, rushing for 157 yards and passing for 88 yards. The Raiders then beat the Minnesota Vikings in Super Bowl XI, rushing for a whopping 266 yards and passing for 180 yards, as Buehler overpowered the opposing defensive tackle, Doug Sutherland.

== Personal life ==
His nephew, David Buehler was the placekicker for the 2007 USC Trojans football team. He was selected by the Dallas Cowboys in the 2009 NFL draft.

== See also ==
- List of American Football League players
