= John Richardson (American football) =

American football player (born 1945)

No. 74, 71
- Position: Defensive tackle

Personal information
- Born: May 25, 1945 (age 81); Minneapolis, Minnesota, U.S.
- Listed height: 6 ft 3 in (1.91 m)
- Listed weight: 245 lb (111 kg)

Career information
- High school: Kearny (San Diego, California)
- College: UCLA (1963-1966)
- NFL draft: 1967: 9th round, 216th overall pick

Career history
- Miami Dolphins (1967-1971); St. Louis Cardinals (1972–1973)

Awards and highlights
- First-team All-American (1966); Second-team All-American (1965); 2× First-team All-Pac-8 (1965, 1966)

Career NFL/AFL statistics
- Fumble recoveries: 3
- Sacks: 15
- Stats at Pro Football Reference

John Howard Richardson (May 25, 1945) is an American former professional football player who was a defensive tackle for seven seasons with the Miami Dolphins and St. Louis Cardinals of the National Football League (NFL). John was a graduate of Kearny High School (San Diego, California). He played college football for the UCLA Bruins, earning first-team All-American honors in 1966.
