= 1966 All-Pacific-8 Conference football team =

The 1966 All-Pacific-8 Conference football team consists of American football players chosen by the Associated Press (AP), the United Press International (UPI), and the Pacific-8 Conference (Pac-8) coaches (Coaches) as the best college football players by position in the Pac-8 during the 1966 NCAA University Division football season.

Four Pac-8 players were also selected as consensus first-team players on the 1966 All-America college football team: UCLA halfback Mel Farr; USC tackle Ron Yary; USC defensive back Nate Shaw; and Washington defensive tackle Tom Greenlee.

== Selectors ==
The AP team was selected by writers and included separate offensive and defensive units and first and second teams.

The UPI team was selected by UPI correspondents who covered West Coast games in 1966. As part of its selection process, the UPI also presented awards to Oregon State fullback Pete Pifer as Back of the Year, USC tackle Ron Yary as Lineman of the Year, and UCLA head coach Tommy Prothro as Coach of the Year.

The Coaches team was selected based on voting by the eight head coaches of the Pac-8 football teams. Four players were selected unanimously by all eight coaches: UCLA quarterback Gary Beban; UCLA running back Mel Farr; USC tackle Ron Yary; and USC defensive back Nate Shaw.

== Teams with most honors ==
The 1966 USC Trojans football team led all other teams with eight players receiving first-team honors from the AP, UPI, or Coaches: halfback Rod Sherman (AP-1, UPI-1, Coaches-1); end Ron Drake (AP-1, UPI-1, Coaches-1); offensive tackle Ron Yary (AP-1, UPI-1, Coaches-1); offensive guard Jim Homan (UPI-1, Coaches-1); defensive end Ray May (AP-1, UPI-1, Coaches-1); middle guard Larry Petrill (Coaches-1); linebacker Adrian Young (AP-1, UPI-1, Coaches-1); and defensive back Nate Shaw (AP-1, UPI-1, Coaches-1).

The 1966 UCLA Bruins football team was ranked No. 5 in the final AP Poll and placed six players receiving first-team honors: quarterback Gary Beban (AP-1, UPI-1, Coaches-1); halfback Mel Farr (AP-1, UPI-1, Coaches-1); offensive guard Rich Deakers (AP-1, UPI-1, Coaches-1); middle guard John Richardson (AP-1, UPI-1, Coaches-1); and linebackers Don Manning (UPI-1, Coaches-1) and Dallas Grider (AP-1).

Oregon State placed five on the first team: fullback Pete Pifer (AP-1, UPI-1, Coaches-1); offensive tackle Jim Wilkin (AP-1, UPI-1, Coaches-1); defensive tackle Dennis Rozario (AP-1, UPI-1); middle guard Skip Diaz (UPI-1, Coaches-1); and linebacker Russ Kuhns (AP-1).

Washington placed four players (three on defense) on the first team: offensive guard Mike Ryan (AP-1, Coaches-1); defensive end Tom Greenlee (AP-1; UPI-1; Coaches-1); defensive tackle Steve Thompson (AP-1, UPI-1, Coaches-1); and defensive back Bob Pederson (AP-1, UPI-1).

== Offensive selections ==
=== Quarterbacks ===
- Gary Beban, UCLA (AP-1 [back]; UPI-1 [quarterback]; Coaches-1 [quarterback])
- Paul Brothers, Oregon State (AP-2 [back])

=== Halfbacks ===
- Mel Farr, UCLA (AP-1 [back]; UPI-1 [halfback]; Coaches-1 [halfback])
- Rod Sherman, USC (AP-1 [back]; UPI-1 [halfback]; Coaches-1 [halfback])
- Bob Grim, Oregon State (AP-2 [back])
- Steve Jones, Oregon (AP-2 [back])

=== Fullbacks ===
- Pete Pifer, Oregon State (AP-1 [back]; UPI-1 [fullback]; Coaches-1 [fullback])
- Stan Root, Stanford (AP-2)

=== Ends ===
- Ron Drake, USC (AP-1; UPI-1; Coaches-1)
- Doug Flansburg, Washington State (AP-1; UPI-1; Coaches-1)
- Jerry Bradley, California (AP-2)
- Dave Williams, Washington (AP-2)

=== Tackles ===
- Jim Wilkin, Oregon State (AP-1; UPI-1; Coaches-1)
- Ron Yary, USC (AP-1; UPI-1; Coaches-1)
- Larry Slagle, UCLA (AP-2)
- Dennis Murphy, UCLA (AP-2)

=== Guards ===
- Rich Deakers, UCLA (AP-1; UPI-1; Coaches-1)
- Jim Homan, USC (AP-2; UPI-1; Coaches-1)
- Mike Ryan, Washington (AP-1; Coaches-1)
- Ross Carter, Oregon (AP-2)

=== Centers ===
- Ron Vrlicak, Washington State (UPI-1; Coaches-1)
- Tim Sheehan, Stanford (AP-1)
- Bill Smith, Oregon (AP-2)

== Defensive selections ==
=== Defensive ends ===
- Tom Greenlee, Washington (AP-1; UPI-1; Coaches-1)
- Ray May, USC (AP-1; UPI-1; Coaches-1)
- Cam Molter, Oregon (AP-2)
- Tim Rossovich, USC (AP-2)

=== Defensive tackles ===
- Steve Thompson, Washington (AP-1; UPI-1; Coaches-1)
- Dennis Rozario, Oregon State (AP-1; UPI-1)
- Monty Mohrman, Stanford (AP-2)
- Alan Claman, UCLA (AP-2)

=== Guards ===
- John Richardson, UCLA (AP-1; UPI-1; Coaches-1)
- Skip Diaz, Oregon State (AP-2 [defensive guard]; UPI-1 [defensive guard]; Coaches-1 [defensive tackle])
- Larry Petrill, USC (Coaches-1)

=== Linebackers ===
- Adrian Young, USC (AP-1; UPI-1; Coaches-1)
- Don Manning, UCLA (AP-2; UPI-1; Coaches-1)
- Dallas Grider, UCLA (AP-1)
- Russ Kuhns, Oregon State (AP-1)
- Bill Enyart, Oregon State (AP-2)
- George Jugum, Washington State (AP-2)

=== Defensive backs ===
- Nate Shaw, USC (AP-1; UPI-1; Coaches-1)
- Jim Smith, Oregon (AP-2; UPI-1; Coaches-1)
- Bob Pederson, Washington (AP-1; UPI-1)
- Wayne Stewart, California (AP-1; Coaches-1)
- Mike Battle, USC (AP-2)
- Dave Peterson, Washington State (AP-2)

== Key ==
AP = Associated Press

UPI = United Press International

Coaches = selected by the eight Pac-8 head football coaches

== See also ==
- 1966 College Football All-America Team
