= Wayne Stewart (American football) =

Canadian gridiron football player (1947–2020)

No. 89
- Position: Tight end

Personal information
- Born: August 18, 1947; Cochrane, Alberta, Canada
- Died: December 4, 2020 (aged 73); Corona del Mar, California, U.S.
- Listed height: 6 ft 7 in (2.01 m)
- Listed weight: 219 lb (99 kg)

Career information
- High school: Earl Warren (Downey, California)
- College: California (1965-1968)
- NFL draft: 1969: 15th round, 390th overall pick

Career history
- New York Jets (1969–1972); San Diego Chargers (1974)

Awards and highlights
- 3× First-team All-Pac-8 (1966, 1967, 1968)

Career NFL/AFL statistics
- Receptions: 27
- Receiving yards: 355
- Receiving touchdowns: 2
- Stats at Pro Football Reference

Wayne Murray Stewart (August 18, 1947 – December 4, 2020) was an American Football League (AFL) and National Football League (NFL) tight end.

He grew up in Downey, California, and attended the University of California. He was selected by the AFL's New York Jets, 390th overall in the 15th round of the 1969 Common Draft. He played one year for the AFL Jets, three years for the Jets in the NFL, and one year for the NFL San Diego Chargers. Combined he played 52 games, making 27 catches for 355 yards and two touchdowns.

Stewart died on December 4, 2020.

== See also ==
- Other American Football League players
