= Malcolm Snider =

American football player (1947–2022)

No. 67
- Positions: Guard, tackle

Personal information
- Born: April 5, 1947; Battle Creek, Michigan, U.S.
- Died: February 19, 2022 (aged 74); Salem, Oregon, U.S.
- Listed height: 6 ft 4 in (1.93 m)
- Listed weight: 251 lb (114 kg)

Career information
- High school: Salem (Salem, Oregon)
- College: Stanford (1965-1968)
- NFL draft: 1969: 3rd round, 54th overall pick

Career history
- Atlanta Falcons (1969–1971); Green Bay Packers (1972–1974)

Awards and highlights
- Second-team All-American (1968); 2× First-team All-Pac-8 (1967, 1968)

Career NFL statistics
- Games played: 83
- Games started: 68
- Stats at Pro Football Reference

Malcolm Pratt Snider (April 5, 1947 – February 19, 2022) was an American professional football guard and tackle who played six seasons in the National Football League (NFL).

== College career ==
After graduating from North Salem High School in Salem, Oregon, Snider attended Stanford University, where he was an All-American tackle in 1968.

== Professional career ==
He was drafted in the third round of the 1969 NFL/AFL draft by the Atlanta Falcons. He played three seasons with the Falcons before being traded to the Green Bay Packers in 1972 where he played three more NFL seasons before retiring.

In 1969, Mal Snider returned a 48 yard kickoff return for a touchdown against the Chicago Bears in a 48-31 win. The record stood for 41 years until Dan Connolly broke the record on December 19, 2010.

While playing football in Wisconsin, Snider attended medical school at the University of Wisconsin part-time, eventually receiving his MD in 1978. He returned to his hometown of Salem where he was a retired orthopedic surgeon.

== Death ==
Snider died on February 19, 2022, in Salem, Oregon, at the age of 74.
