= Ken Wiedemann =

American football player

Profile
- Position: Defensive back

Personal information
- Listed height: 5 ft 11 in (1.80 m)
- Listed weight: 175 lb (79 kg)

Career information
- High school: West Covina (CA)
- College: California (1967–1969)

Awards and highlights
- 3× First-team All-Pac-8 (1967, 1968, 1969)

Kenneth Maxim Wiedemann is an American former football player.

Wiedemann played at the defensive back position for the California Golden Bears football team from 1967 to 1969. As a sophomore in 1967, he was selected by the UPI as an all-conference player. As a junior, he was selected by the AP, UPI, and Pac-8 coaches as a first-team player on the 1968 All-Pacific-8 Conference football team. He was also selected by the UPI for the same honor in 1969. He was on pace to break the Pac-8 record for interceptions, but he missed part of his senior season with a knee injury. He finished his college career as Cal's all-time leader with 16 interceptions for 184 yards and two touchdowns.

Wiedemann was not selected in the 1970 NFL Draft. In 1972, he joined the coaching staff at Mt. San Antonio College.

After his football career ended, Wiedemann obtained a Ph.D. in clinical psychology and practiced as a psychologist. He was inducted into the California Athletics Hall of Fame in 2017.
