= Mike McCaffrey =

American football player (born 1946)

No. 64
- Position: Linebacker

Personal information
- Born: April 11, 1946 (age 80); Bakersfield, California, U.S.
- Listed height: 6 ft 3 in (1.91 m)
- Listed weight: 235 lb (107 kg)

Career information
- High school: Garces Memorial (Bakersfield)
- College: California (1965-1968)
- NFL draft: 1969: 4th round, 95th overall pick

Career history
- Minnesota Vikings (1969); Buffalo Bills (1970)

Awards and highlights
- 2× First-team All-Pac-8 (1967, 1968)

Career NFL statistics
- Sacks: 1.5
- Stats at Pro Football Reference

Michael James McCaffrey (born April 11, 1946) is an American former professional football player who was a linebacker for the Buffalo Bills of the National Football League (NFL). He played college football for the California Golden Bears.
