= Gwen Cooper (American football) =

American football player (born 1948)

UCLA Bruins
- Position: End

Personal information
- Born: December 13, 1948 (age 77); Wichita, Kansas, U.S.
- Listed height: 6 ft 3 in (1.91 m)
- Listed weight: 205 lb (93 kg)

Career information
- High school: Leuzinger (CA)
- College: UCLA (1968–1969); Ottawa Rough Riders (1970)

Awards and highlights
- First-team All-Pac-8 (1969)

Floyd Gwen Cooper (born December 13, 1948) is an American former gridiron football player. He played college football at the end position for the UCLA Bruins from 1967 to 1969. During the 1969 season, he caught 38 passes for 734 yards and nine touchdowns. He was selected by the AP, UPI, and Pac-8 coaches as a first-team player on the 1969 All-Pacific Coast football team. He also played professional football in the Canadian Football League (CFL) for the Ottawa Rough Riders in 1970.
