= 1969 All-Pacific Coast football team =

American all-star college football team

The 1969 All-Pacific Coast football team consisted of American football players chosen by the Associated Press (AP), the United Press International (UPI), and the Pacific-8 Conference coaches (Coaches) as the best college football players by position in the Pacific Coast region during the 1969 NCAA University Division football season. The AP and UPI selections included players from within and outside the Pacific-8 Conference. The Coaches selections were limited to Pacific-8 players.

The 1969 UCLA Bruins football team led all other programs with nine players selected to one or more of the first teams. UCLA's first-team players were: running backs Greg Jones (AP-1, UPI-1, Coaches-1) and Mickey Cureton (UPI-1); end Gwen Cooper (AP-1, UPI-1, Coaches-1); offensive tackle Gordon Bosserman (UPI-1); offensive guard Dennis Alumbaugh (AP-1, Coaches-1); defensive tackles Floyd Reese (AP-1, Coaches-1) and Wes Grant (Coaches-1); linebacker Mike Ballou (AP-1, UPI-1, Coaches-1); and defensive back Ron Carver (UPI-1).

The undefeated 1969 USC Trojans football team was ranked No. 3 in the final AP Poll and placed seven players on the first team: running back Clarence Davis (AP-1, UPI-1, Coaches-1); offensive tackle Sid Smith (AP-1, UPI-1, Coaches-1); offensive guard Fred Khasigian (AP-1, UPI-1, Coaches-1); defensive end Jimmy Gunn (AP-1, UPI-1); defensive tackle Al Cowlings (AP-1, UPI-1, Coaches-1); and defensive backs Tyrone Hudson (AP-1, Coaches-1) and Sandy Durko (UPI-1).

== Offensive selections ==
=== Quarterbacks ===
- Jim Plunkett, Stanford (AP-1; UPI-1; Coaches-1)
- Dennis Shaw, San Diego State (AP-2; UPI-2)

=== Running backs ===
- Clarence Davis, USC (AP-1; UPI-1; Coaches-1)
- Greg Jones, UCLA (AP-1; UPI-1; Coaches-1)
- Bobby Moore, Oregon (AP-1; UPI-1 [end]; Coaches-1) (later Ahmad Rashad)
- Mickey Cureton, UCLA (AP-2; UPI-1)
- Bo Cornell, Washington (AP-2)
- Gary Fowler, California (AP-2)
- Bubba Brown, Stanford (UPI-2)
- George Farmer, UCLA (UPI-2)
- Billy Main, Oregon State (UPI-2)

=== Ends ===
- Gwen Cooper, UCLA (AP-1; UPI-1; Coaches-1)
- Bob Moore, Stanford (AP-1; UPI-2; Coaches-1)
- Tom Reynolds, San Diego State (AP-2; UPI-2)
- Sam Dickerson, USC (AP-2)

=== Tackles ===
- Sid Smith, USC (AP-1; UPI-1; Coaches-1)
- Bob Richards, California (AP-1; UPI-2; Coaches-1)
- Gordon Bosserman, UCLA (AP-2; UPI-1)
- Ernie Janet, Washington (AP-2)
- Pete Seymour, Stanford (UPI-2)

=== Guards ===
- Fred Khasigian, USC (AP-1; UPI-1; Coaches-1)
- Dennis Alumbaugh, UCLA (AP-1; UPI-2; Coaches-1)
- Bob Reinhard, Stanford (AP-2; UPI-1)
- Greg Hendren, California (AP-2)
- Steve Lehmer, USC (UPI-2)

=== Centers ===
- John Sande, Stanford (AP-2; UPI-1; Coaches-1)
- Bill Pierson, San Diego State (AP-1)
- Mike White, Oregon State (UPI-2)

== Defensive selections ==
=== Defensive ends ===
- Jimmy Gunn, USC (AP-1; UPI-1)
- Irby Augustine, California (AP-1; UPI-1)
- Wes Grant, UCLA (AP-2; UPI-2; Coaches-1 [interior line])
- Charlie Weaver, USC (AP-2)
- Dennis Gassner, Oregon State (UPI-2)

=== Defensive tackles ===
- Al Cowlings, USC (AP-1 [defensive tackle]; UPI-1 [defensive tackle]; Coaches-1 [interior line])
- Floyd Reese, UCLA (AP-1 [defensive tackle]; UPI-2 [defensive tackle]; Coaches-1 interior line])
- Lee Brock, Washington (AP-2 [defensive tackle]; UPI-1 [defensive tackle])
- Tody Smith, USC (AP-2)
- Bill Nelson, Oregon State (AP-2)

=== Middle guards ===
- Jess Lewis, Oregon State (AP-1 [middle guard]; UPI-2 [defensive tackle]; Coaches-1 [interior line])

=== Linebackers ===
- Mike Ballou, UCLA (AP-1; UPI-1; Coaches-1)
- Don Parish, Stanford (AP-1; UPI-1; Coaches-1)
- Tom Graham, Oregon (AP-1; UPI-1)
- Phil Croyle, California (AP-2; UPI-2)
- Greg Slough, USC (AP-2)
- Pat Preston, Stanford (AP-2)
- Vic Ornelas, Pacific (UPI-2)
- Paul Martyr, California (UPI-2)

=== Defensive backs ===
- Lionel Thomas, Washington State (AP-1; UPI-1; Coaches-1)
- Mel Easley, Oregon State (AP-1; UPI-2; Coaches-1)
- Tyrone Hudson, USC (AP-1; UPI-2; Coaches-1)
- Rich Keller, Stanford (AP-2; Coaches-1)
- Sandy Durko, USC (AP-2; UPI-1)
- Ron Carver, UCLA (AP-2; UPI-1)
- Ken Wiedemann, California (UPI-1)
- Jim Kauffman, Stanford (UPI-2)
- Jack Gleason, Oregon (UPI-2)

== Key ==
AP = Associated Press

UPI = United Press International

Coaches = selected by the Pac-8 head football coaches

== See also ==
- 1969 College Football All-America Team
