= John Grant (American football) =

American football player (born 1950)

No. 63
- Position: Defensive tackle

Personal information
- Born: June 28, 1950 (age 76); Boise, Idaho, U.S.
- Listed height: 6 ft 3 in (1.91 m)
- Listed weight: 241 lb (109 kg)

Career information
- High school: Capital (Boise)
- College: USC
- NFL draft: 1973: 7th round, 166th overall pick

Career history
- Denver Broncos (1973–1979)

Awards and highlights
- National champion (1972); First-team All-American (1972); 2× First-team All-Pac-8 (1971, 1972)

Career NFL statistics
- Games played: 99
- Games started: 29
- Fumble recoveries: 8
- Stats at Pro Football Reference

John David Grant (born June 28, 1950) is an American former professional football player who was a defensive tackle seven seasons with the Denver Broncos of the National Football League (NFL).

Born and raised in Boise, Idaho, Grant graduated from its Capital High School and played college football for the USC Trojans in Los Angeles under head coach John McKay. In his senior season in 1972, the Trojans were undefeated and consensus national champions. Grant was first-team All-Pac-8 in 1971 and 1972, and a first-team All-American in 1972.

Grant was among ten Trojans selected in the 1973 NFL draft, taken in the seventh round by Denver. He was part of the Bronco's Orange Crush defense in 1977 which led the team to Super Bowl XII; it was the franchise's first appearance in the postseason.
