= 1967 All-Pacific-8 Conference football team =

The 1967 All-Pacific-8 Conference football team consists of American football players chosen by the Associated Press (AP), the United Press International (UPI), and the Pacific-8 Conference (Pac-8) coaches (Coaches) as the best college football players by position in the Pac-8 during the 1967 NCAA University Division football season.

The 1967 USC Trojans football team won the national championship and placed seven players on the first team: running back O. J. Simpson; end Earl McCullouch; offensive tackle Ron Yary; offensive guard Mike Scarpace; defensive end Tim Rossovich; linebacker Adrian Young; and defensive back Mike Battle.

== Offensive selections ==
=== Quarterbacks ===
- Gary Beban, UCLA (AP-1 [back]; UPI-1 [back]; Coaches-1 [quarterback])
- Steve Preece, Oregon State (AP-2; UPI-2 [back]; Coaches-2 [quarterback])

=== Backs ===
- Bill Enyart, Oregon State (AP-1; UPI-1; Coaches-1)
- O. J. Simpson, USC (AP-1; UPI-1; Coaches-1)
- Gene Washington, Stanford (AP-1; UPI-1; Coaches-1)
- Rick Purdy, UCLA (AP-2; UPI-2; Coaches-2)
- Greg Jones, UCLA (AP-2; UPI-2)
- Paul Williams, California (AP-2)
- Jim Lawrence, USC (UPI-2)
- Bill Main, Oregon State (Coaches-2)
- Claxton Welch, Oregon (Coaches-2)

=== Ends ===
- Earl McCullouch, USC (AP-1; UPI-1; Coaches-1)
- Wayne Stewart, California (AP-1; UPI-2; Coaches-2)
- George Buehler, Stanford (UPI-1)
- Gary Houser, Oregon State (Coaches-1)
- Dave Nuttall, UCLA (AP-2; UPI-2)
- Doug Flansburg, Washington State (AP-2)
- Bob Klein, USC (Coaches-2)

=== Tackles ===
- Larry Slagle, UCLA (AP-1; UPI-1; Coaches-1)
- Ron Yary, USC (AP-1; UPI-1; Coaches-1)
- Mal Snider, Stanford (UPI-2; Coaches-1)
- Bob Richardson, Washington (AP-2; Coaches-2)
- Roger Stalick, Oregon State (AP-2)
- Mike Taylor, USC (UPI-2)

=== Guards ===
- Dave Marlette, Oregon State (AP-1; UPI-2; Coaches-1)
- Mike Scarpace, USC (AP-1; UPI-1; Coaches-2)
- Dennis Murphy, UCLA (AP-2; Coaches-1)
- Dave Middendorf, Washington State (UPI-1; Coaches-2)
- Bob Heffernan, Stanford (AP-2)
- Ken Bajema, UCLA (UPI-2)

=== Centers ===
- John Erquiaga, UCLA (AP-2; UPI-1; Coaches-1)
- John Didion, Oregon State (AP-1; UPI-2; Coaches-2)

== Defensive selections ==
=== Defensive ends ===
- Tim Rossovich, USC (AP-1; UPI-1; Coaches-1)
- Dean Halverson, Washington (AP-1; UPI-1; Coaches-2)
- Mike McCaffrey, California (Coaches-1)
- Jimmy Gunn, USC (UPI-2; Coaches-2)
- Tom Hazelrigg, Stanford (AP-2)
- Harry Gunner, Oregon State (AP-2)
- Cam Molter, Oregon (UPI-2)

=== Defensive tackles ===
- Steve Thompson, Washington (AP-1; UPI-1; Coaches-1)
- Jess Lewis, Oregon State (AP-1; UPI-2; Coaches-2)
- Blaine Nye, Stanford (AP-2; Coaches-1)
- Ron Boley, Oregon State (AP-2; UPI-1)
- Al Claman, UCLA (UPI-2; Coaches-2)

=== Guard ===
- George Dames, Oregon (AP-1 [guard]; UPI-1 [linebacker]; Coaches-1 [guard])
- Jon Sandstrom, Oregon State (AP-2 [guard]; UPI-2 [linebacker])
- Mike Maggart, Washington (Coaches-2)

=== Linebackers ===
- Don Manning, UCLA (AP-1; UPI-1; Coaches-1)
- Adrian Young, USC (AP-1; UPI-1; Coaches-1)
- Martin Brill, Stanford (AP-2; UPI-2; Coaches-1)
- Skip Vanderbundt, Oregon State (AP-1; UPI-2; Coaches-2)
- Jim Snow, USC (AP-2; Coaches-2)
- George Jugum, Washington (AP-2)
- Jim Featherstone, California (Coaches-2)

=== Defensive backs ===
- Jim Smith, Oregon (AP-1; UPI-1; Coaches-1)
- Mark Gustafson, UCLA (AP-2; UPI-1; Coaches-1)
- Mike Battle, USC (AP-1; UPI-1)
- Bobby Smith, California (AP-1; UPI-2; Coaches-2)
- Ken Wiedemann, California (AP-2; UPI-1)
- Mark Waletich, Oregon State (AP-2; UPI-2)
- Bob Pederson, Washington (UPI-2)
- Dan Sprlesterbach, Washington (UPI-2)
- Pat Cashman, USC (Coaches-2)
- Andy Herrera, UCLA (Coaches-2)

== Special teams ==
=== Kicker ===
- Zenon Andrusyshyn, UCLA (UPI-1)

== Key ==
AP = Associated Press

UPI = United Press International

Coaches = chosen by the Pac-8 head coaches

== See also ==
- 1967 College Football All-America Team
