= 1968 All-America college football team =

Official list of the best college football players of 1968

The 1968 All-America college football team is composed of college football players who were selected as All-Americans by various organizations that chose College Football All-America Teams in 1968.

The NCAA recognizes six selectors as "official" for the 1968 season. They are (1) the American Football Coaches Association (AFCA), (2) the Associated Press (AP), (3) the Central Press Association (CP), (4) the Football Writers Association of America (FWAA), (5) the Newspaper Enterprise Association (NEA), and (6) the United Press International (UPI). Four of the six teams (AP, UPI, NEA, and FWAA) were selected by polling of sports writers and/or broadcasters. The Central Press team was selected with input from the captains of the major college teams. The AFCA team was based on a poll of coaches. Other notable selectors, though not recognized by the NCAA as official, included Football News, a national weekly football publication, Time magazine, The Sporting News (TSN), and the Walter Camp Football Foundation (WC).

No single team dominated the All-America selections in 1968 with Ohio State and Notre Dame both having three first-team players.

== Offensive selections ==
=== Ends ===
- Ted Kwalick, Penn State (College Football Hall of Fame) (AFCA [tight end], AP-1 [tight end], CP-1, FWAA, NEA-1 [tight end], UPI-1, Time, TSN-1, WC)
- Jerry Levias, SMU (College Football Hall of Fame) (AFCA [flanker], AP-2, CP-1, FWAA, NEA-1 [split end], UPI-2, TSN-2, FN [flanker], WC, WC)
- Ron Sellers, Florida State (College Football Hall of Fame) (AFCA [split end], AP-1 [split end], CP-2, NEA-2, UPI-2, FN, Time, TSN-1)
- Jim Seymour, Notre Dame (AFCA [split end], AP-2, CP-2, UPI-1, FN, TSN-1, WC)
- Steve Zabel, Oklahoma (NEA-2 [tight end])
- Gene Washington, Stanford (AP-3, CP-3)
- Eddie Hinton, Oklahoma (AP-3)
- Bob Klein, USC (TSN-2)

=== Tackles ===
- George Kunz, Notre Dame (AFCA, AP-2, CP-1, FWAA, NEA-1, UPI-1, FN, Time, TSN-1, WC)
- Dave Foley, Ohio State (AFCA, AP-1, CP-1, FWAA, NEA-1, UPI-1, FN, Time, WC, TSN-2)
- Rufus Mayes, Ohio State (AP-2, CP-2, NEA-2, UPI-2, Time, TSN-1)
- Ken Carmon, Ohio (AP-3, CP-3)
- Greg Shelly, Virginia (AP-3)
- Jim Anderson, Missouri (CP-3)

=== Guards ===
- Charles Rosenfelder, Tennessee (AFCA, AP-1, CP-1, FWAA, NEA-1, UPI-1, FN, WC)
- Jim Barnes, Arkansas (AP-1, CP-1, NEA-2, UPI-2, TSN-2)
- Mike Montler, Colorado (AFCA, AP-1 [tackle], CP-2 [tackle], UPI-2 [tackle], TSN-2 [tackle])
- Guy Dennis, Florida (CP-2, NEA-2, UPI-1, FN, WC)
- John Shinners, Xavier (NEA-1, Time, TSN-1)
- Joe Armstrong, Nebraska (AP-2, CP-2, FWAA)
- Malcolm Snider, Stanford (NEA-2, TSN-1)
- Don King, Texas Tech (AP-2, CP-3)
- Ken Mendenhall, Oklahoma (UPI-2)
- Gary Roberts, Purdue (AP-3)
- Alvin Samples, Alabama (AP-3)
- John Miller, Lehigh (CP-3)
- Dave Bradley, Penn State (TSN-2)

=== Centers ===
- John Didion, Oregon State (AFCA, AP-1, CP-1, FWAA, NEA-1, UPI-1, FN, Time, TSN-1, WC)
- Carey Metts, North Carolina State (AP-2)
- Jon Kolb, Oklahoma State (AP-3, CP-2, NEA-2, UPI-2)
- Jerry Murphy, Brown (CP-3)
- Jack Rudnay, Northwestern (TSN-2)

=== Quarterbacks ===
- Terry Hanratty, Notre Dame (AFCA [tie], AP-1, CP-1, FWAA, NEA-2, UPI-1, FN, Time, TSN-1, WC)
- Bobby Douglass, Kansas (AFCA [tie], AP-2, NEA-1, UPI-2, TSN-2)
- Greg Cook, Cincinnati (CP-2)
- Steve Sogge, USC (AP-3)
- Brian Dowling, Yale (CP-3)

=== Running backs ===
- O. J. Simpson, USC (College and Pro Football Halls of Fame)(AFCA [halfback], AP-1, CP-1 [halfback], FWAA, NEA-1, UPI-1, FN [halfback], Time, TSN-1, WC)
- Leroy Keyes, Purdue (College Football Hall of Fame) (AFCA [halfback], AP-1, CP-1 [halfback], FWAA, NEA-1 [defensive back], UPI-1, FN [halfback], Time, TSN-1 [cornerback], WC)
- Chris Gilbert, Texas (College Football Hall of Fame) (AFCA [halfback], AP-1, CP-3, NEA-1 [halfback], UPI-2, FN [halfback], TSN-2)
- Bill Enyart, Oregon State (College Football Hall of Fame) (AP-3, CP-1 [fullback], NEA-2 [fullback], UPI-1, Time, TSN-1 [linebacker])
- Paul Gipson, Houston (AFCA [fullback], AP-2, CP-3, NEA-1 [fullback], Time, TSN-2)
- Ron Johnson, Michigan (College Football Hall of Fame) (AP-2, CP-2, FWAA, NEA-2, UPI-2, FN [halfback])
- Larry Smith, Florida (TSN-1)
- Steve Owens, Oklahoma (College Football Hall of Fame) (AP-2, CP-2, FN [halfback])
- Mercury Morris, West Texas State (AP-3, CP-3, NEA-2, UPI-2, FN [halfback], TSN-2)
- Charley Jarvis, Army (AP-3)
- Jim Otis, Ohio State (CP-2)

== Defensive selections ==
=== Defensive ends ===
- Ted Hendricks, Miami (FL) (College and Pro Football Halls of Fame) (AFCA, AP-1, CP-1, FWAA, NEA-1, UPI-1, FN, Time, TSN-1, WC)
- John Zook, Kansas (AFCA, AP-1, CP-1, FWAA, NEA-2, UPI-1, FN, TSN-2)
- Bob Stein, Minnesota (AP-3, UPI-2, WC)
- Ron Carpenter, North Carolina State (NEA-1)
- Jimmy Gunn, USC (AP-2)
- Mike Ford, Alabama (AP-2, UPI-2)
- Billy Payne, Georgia (AP-3)
- Julian Nunamaker, Tennessee-Martin (TSN-2)

=== Defensive tackles ===
- Bill Stanfill, Georgia (College Football Hall of Fame) (AFCA, AP-1, CP-1, FWAA, NEA-2 [defensive end], UPI-1, FN, Time, TSN-1, WC)
- Joe Greene, North Texas State (College and Pro Football Halls of Fame) (AP-1, NEA-1, UPI-1, FN, Time, TSN-1, WC)
- Loyd Wainscott, Texas (AP-2, CP-1, FWAA)
- Rolf Krueger, Texas A&M (UPI-2, Time, TSN-1)
- David Campbell, Auburn (AP-3, NEA-1)
- Mike Reid, Penn State (AP-2, NEA-2)
- Tom Nelson, Arizona (AP-3, NEA-2)
- Art Thoms, Syracuse (UPI-2)

=== Middle guards ===
- Ed White, California (College Football Hall of Fame) (AFCA [defensive tackle], AP-1, CP-1, [guard], FWAA, NEA-1, UPI-2, FN, TSN-2)
- Chuck Kyle, Purdue (AFCA, AP-2, CP-1 [guard], FWAA, UPI-1, WC)
- Ernie Calloway, Texas Southern (NEA-2, TSN-2)
- Carl Crennel, West Virginia (AP-3)
- Steve Greer, Georgia (CP-2)

=== Linebackers ===
- Dennis Onkotz, Penn State (College Football Hall of Fame) (AP-1, FWAA, UPI-1, FN, WC)
- Steve Kiner, Tennessee (College Football Hall of Fame) (AP-1, CP-1, FWAA, FN)
- Bob Babich, Miami (Ohio) (College Football Hall of Fame) (AFCA, AP-2, Time, TSN-1)
- Ron Pritchard, Arizona State (College Football Hall of Fame) (AP-2, NEA-1, UPI-2, Time, TSN-1)
- Mike Hall, Alabama (AP-2, CP-1, NEA-2, WC)
- Ken Johnson, Army (AFCA, NEA-2)
- Mike Widger, Virginia Tech (AP-1)
- Bill Hobbs, Texas A&M (AP-3, UPI-1)
- Chip Healy, Vanderbilt (CP-1, TSN-2)
- Dale McCullers, Florida State (AP-3, NEA-1)
- Jim Sniadecki, Indiana (UPI-2, TSN-2)
- Ken Criter, Wisconsin (AP-3)
- Tom Stincic, Michigan (TSN-2)

=== Defensive backs ===
- Roger Wehrli, Missouri (College and Pro Football Halls of Fame) (AFCA, AP-1, CP-1, FWAA, NEA-1 [safety], UPI-1, FN, Time, TSN-1, WC)
- Jake Scott, Georgia (College Football Hall of Fame) (AFCA, AP-1, UPI-1, NEA-1, WC, FWAA, FN, TSN-2)
- Al Worley, Washington (AFCA, AP-1, CP-1, NEA-2 [safety], UPI-1, FN, TSN-2)
- Mike Battle, USC (FWAA, UPI-1, FN, WC, TSN-2)
- Al Brenner, Michigan State (AFCA, AP-3, CP-3 [offensive end], NEA-1 [safety], UPI-2, TSN-2)
- Tony Kyasky, Syracuse (AP-2, NEA-2 [safety], UPI-2, WC, Time, TSN-2 [safety])
- Jim Marsalis, Tennessee State (NEA-2, Time, TSN-1)
- Tommy Maxwell, Texas A&M (Time, TSN-1)
- Jim Weatherford, Tennessee (AFCA, UPI-2)
- Ted Provost, Ohio State (AP-2)
- Tom Curtis, Michigan (College Football Hall of Fame) (AP-2, UPI-2)
- Bill Kishman, Colorado State (NEA-2)
- Johnny Peacock, Houston (AP-3)
- Jim Livingston, Southern Methodist (AP-3)
- Ed Hayes, Morgan State (TSN-2)
- Eugene Epps, Texas-El Paso (TSN-2)

== Special teams ==
=== Kicker ===
- Ken Vinyard, Texas Tech (TSN-1)
- Gerald Warren, North Carolina State (TSN-2)

=== Punter ===
- Steve O'Neal, Texas A&M (TSN-1)
- Bill Bradley, Texas (TSN-2)

== Key ==
- **Bold** – Consensus All-American
- -1 – First-team selection
- -2 – Second-team selection
- -3 – Third-team selection

=== Official selectors ===
- AFCA = American Football Coaches Association
- AP = Associated Press
- CP = Central Press Association
- FWAA = Football Writers Association of America
- NEA = Newspaper Enterprise Association
- UPI = United Press International

=== Unofficial selectors ===
- FN = The Football News, consisting of the 33 best college football players as selected by the staff and correspondents of The Football News
- Time = Time magazine
- TSN = The Sporting News
- WC = Walter Camp Football Foundation

== See also ==
- 1968 All-Atlantic Coast Conference football team
- 1968 All-Big Eight Conference football team
- 1968 All-Big Ten Conference football team
- 1968 All-Pacific-8 Conference football team
- 1968 All-SEC football team
- 1968 All-Southwest Conference football team
