= George Jugum =

American gridiron football player (born 1946)

Profile
- Position: Linebacker

Personal information
- Born: June 5, 1946 (age 75); Seattle, Washington, U.S.
- Listed height: 6 ft 0 in (1.83 m)
- Listed weight: 232 lb (105 kg)

Career information
- High school: West (Seattle)
- College: Washington

Career history
- 1969: Seattle Rangers
- 1970: BC Lions

Awards and highlights
- First-team All-Pac-8 (1968); 2× Second-team All-Pac-8 (1966, 1967)

George Jugum (born June 5, 1946) was a gridiron football linebacker. He played college football for the University of Washington Huskies from 1966 to 1968. He was selected by the AP, UPI, and Pac-8 coaches as a first-team player on the 1968 All-Pacific-8 Conference football team. He then played professional football for the Seattle Rangers of the Continental Football League in 1969 and the BC Lions of the Canadian Football League (CFL) in 1970. He did not play in 1971 and left the club in 1972.

In 1974, he was convicted of second-degree murder in the beating and kicking death of a 17-year-old youth in the parking lot of a West Seattle drive-in. He was sentenced to 30 years in prison, and released after six and a half years.
