= Gene Washington (American football, born 1947) =

American football player (born 1947)

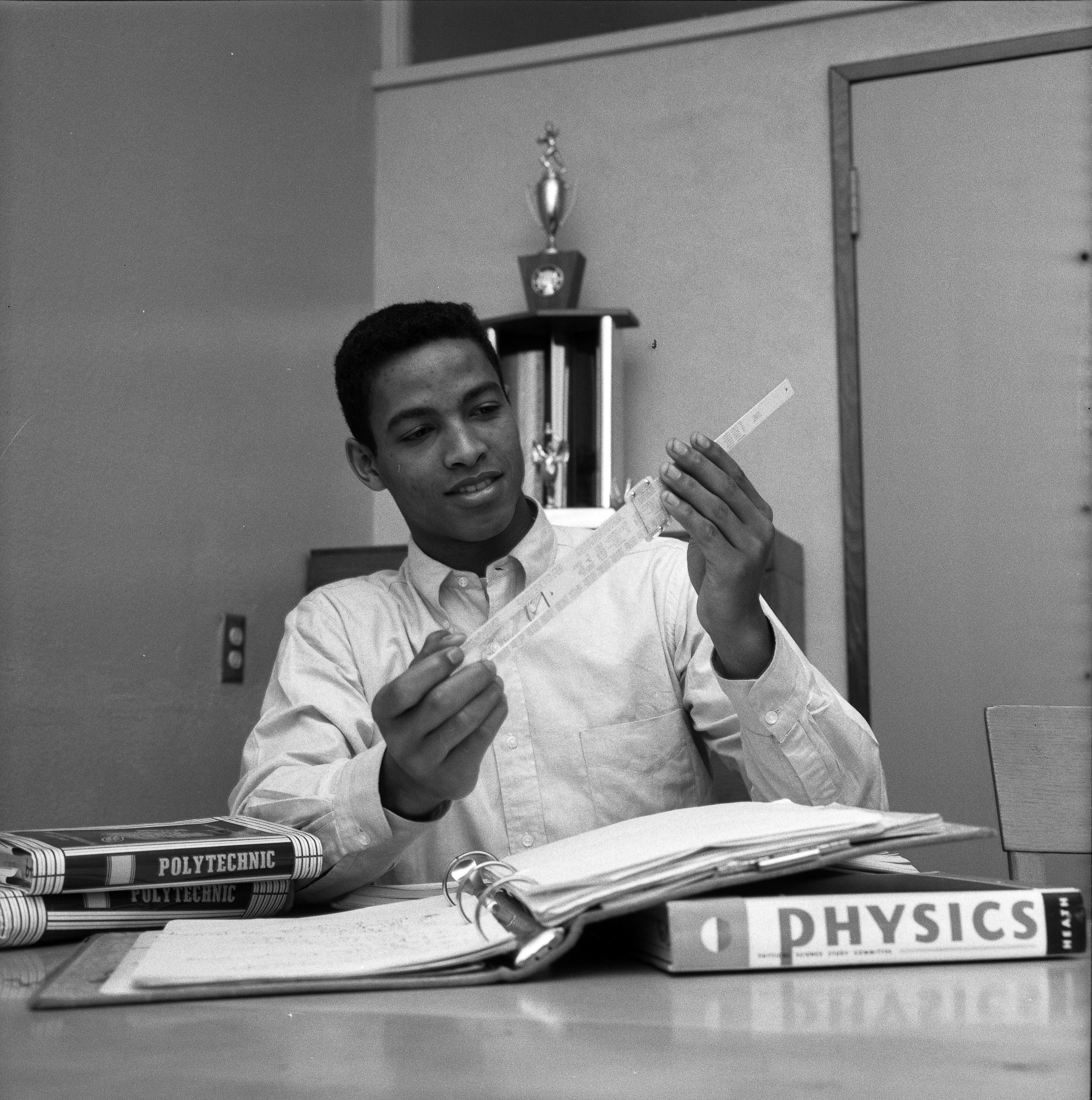
- Washington in 1965

No. 18
- Position: Wide receiver

Personal information
- Born: January 14, 1947 (age 79); Tuscaloosa, Alabama, U.S.
- Listed height: 6 ft 2 in (1.88 m)
- Listed weight: 185 lb (84 kg)

Career information
- High school: Long Beach Polytechnic (Long Beach, California)
- College: Stanford
- NFL draft: 1969: 1st round, 16th overall pick

Career history
- San Francisco 49ers (1969–1977); Detroit Lions (1979)

Awards and highlights
- 3× First-team All-Pro (1969, 1970, 1972); Second-team All-Pro (1971); 4× Pro Bowl (1969–1972); NFL receiving yards leader (1970); NFL receiving touchdowns leader (1972); Third-team All-American (1968); 2× First-team All-Pac-8 (1967, 1968)

Career NFL statistics
- Receptions: 385
- Receiving yards: 6,856
- Receiving touchdowns: 60
- Stats at Pro Football Reference

Gene Alden Washington (born January 14, 1947) is an American former professional football player who was a wide receiver in the National Football League (NFL) for the San Francisco 49ers and Detroit Lions.

== Early life ==
Washington was born on January 14, 1947, in Tuscaloosa, Alabama. He was raised in California, and attended Long Beach Polytechnic High School. He was a multi-talented quarterback, and led the team to a league championship in 1964. That year he was also shared in the Back of the Year award and was selected to the All-City team. He was also a forward on the school's championship basketball team.

Along with his athletic excellence, Washington also was an excellent student and a school leader. In 1965, he was elected the 50-year-old school's first black student body president. While he was in high school, Washington had jobs with a public opinion research firm and as an assistant cashier, also serving as a youth leader in his Baptist church. Among his motivations in excelling in so many ways was his intention for others to see African Americans succeed.

He was the number one football recruit coming out of high school in Southern California.

== College football ==
Washington played three years of varsity college football for Stanford University (1966–68). When he matriculated to Stanford, he was one of only 25 black students in a student population of 10,000. He played quarterback as a sophomore, running back as a junior and wide receiver as a senior. He was the Cardinal's first black quarterback. As a quarterback in 1966, he had a 34.3 completion percentage, with four touchdowns and 11 passes thrown for interceptions; along with 136 rushing attempts for 362 yards (2.7 yards per attempt).

As a junior and senior, he was used principally as a receiver. In his junior year (1967), Washington led the Athletic Association of Western Universities (AAWU) with 48 receptions, and as a senior in 1968 he led the renamed Pacific Eight Conference (Pac-8) in receptions with 71, receiving yards with 1,117 and receiving touchdowns with eight.

During his time at Stanford, he set the career records for receptions (122) and receiving yards (1,785), and as a senior he set single season records for receptions (71) and touchdowns (8). He was a unanimous Pacific Eight All-Conference Player. He also earned All-America honors as a receiver.

He is a member of Delta Tau Delta International Fraternity. He was only the fraternity's second black member when he joined.

== Professional football ==
=== Playing career ===
The San Francisco 49ers selected Washington with the 16th pick in the first round of the 1969 NFL/AFL draft.

As a rookie in 1969, he started all 14 games at wide receiver, with 51 receptions for 711 yards. He was third in the Associated Press (AP) rookie of the year voting, behind Calvin Hill and Larry Brown, and third in United Press International's (UPI) rookie of the year voting behind Hill and Joe Greene. He was selected to play in the Pro Bowl that year, and The Sporting News named him first-team All-Conference.

Washington had his best year in 1970. He caught 53 passes for a league leading 1,100 yards, averaging nearly 21 yards per reception. He also had 12 receiving touchdowns. He was named first-team All-Pro by the AP, the Pro Football Writers of America, the Newspaper Enterprise Association (NEA) and Pro Football Weekly. He was selected to the Pro Bowl for a second consecutive year.

Washington had 46 receptions in both 1971 and 1972, averaging 19.2 and 20 yards per catch respectively. His 12 touchdown receptions in 1972 led the NFL. He was selected to the Pro Bowl both years. In 1971, the AP, UPI, Pro Football Weekly and Sporting News named him first-team All-Conference, and the NEA and Pro Football Writers named him second-team All-Pro. In 1972, the AP, Pro Football Writers, and Pro Football Weekly again named him first-team All-Pro, and the NEA named him second-team All-Pro.

As a rookie, Washington's 49ers were 4–8–2, but over the next three years they were 10–3–1, 9–5, and 8–5–1, winning three division titles and reaching the playoffs all three years. During Washington's remaining playing years in San Francisco (1973–77), however, the team did not make the playoffs again and had only one winning season. Washington continued to play well, but the 49ers were unstable at quarterback. During 1974, the 49ers started four different quarterbacks, but Washington led the league with a 21.2 yards per reception average.

In Washington's final year with the 49ers, 1977, he had 32 receptions for 638 yards (19.9 yards per catch) and five touchdowns. Yet, the 49ers waived him at the end of the year. At the time his 49ers career ended, he was the all-time team leader in receiving yards (6,664), receptions (371), and receiving touchdowns (59).

After a year off, he played another year with the Detroit Lions in 1979, where he started 13 games, and had 14 receptions for 192 yards.

He was one of two wide receivers in the NFL with the same name during the first five years of his career as an active player, but neither were ever teammates.

=== NFL executive ===
He was the director of football operations for the NFL from 1994 to 2009. Among other things, as part of his role in maintaining the integrity of the game, he was responsible for player fines and suspensions in the event of misconduct warranting those penalties. In his director role, Washington also served as the league's liaison to the NCAA, high schools and other entities involved in organized football; and he was in charge of studying league safety issues.

== Legacy and honors ==
In 2004, Washington was named as one of Sports Illustrated's "101 Most Influential Minorities in Sports." In 2007, he was inducted into the Alabama Sports Hall of Fame. In 2009, he was inducted into the John McLendon Minority Athletics Directors Hall of Fame. In 2012, he was inducted into the Bay Area Sports Hall of Fame. In 2008, he was in the inaugural class of the Long Beach Polytechnic Football Hall of Fame, and was in the inaugural class (2022) of the California High School Football Hall of Fame.

In 2015, the Professional Football Researchers Association named Washington to the PFRA Hall of Very Good Class of 2015.

== Personal life ==
Washington is a former board member of the National Park Foundation. He has two children, Daniel and Kelly. In 1992, he became the first black member of the Los Angeles Country Club.

Living and playing in California gave Washington the opportunity to appear in a number of films and television series. In 1974, he was one of six NFL players starring in The Black Six, about six bikers fighting racism in a southern town to avenge the death of a friend. The other NFL players/actors included Joe Green, Carl Eller, Willie Lanier, and Mercury Morris.

He also served as a commentator for NBC's NFL coverage in the early 1980s and sports anchor at KABC-TV in the late 1980s.

He was the guest of US Secretary of State Condoleezza Rice at a State Dinner for Elizabeth II and a State Dinner for Ghanaian President John Kufuor.

== Film and television ==
- Banacek episode "Let's Hear It for a Living Legend" (1972) as Clay Mills
- The Mod Squad episode "The Connection" (1972)
- Black Gunn (1972) as Elmo
- The Black Six as Bubba Daniels
- Airport 1975 (1974) as himself, uncredited
- McMillan & Wife episode "Guilt by Association" as Luke Johnson
- Lady Cocoa (1975) as Doug

== NFL career statistics ==
Legend
	Led the league
**Bold**	Career high

=== Regular season ===
Year	Team	Games		Receiving				
Year	Team	GP	GS	Rec	Yds	Avg	Lng	TD
1969	SF	14	14	51	711	13.9	52	3
1970	SF	13	13	**53**	**1,100**	20.8	**79**	**12**
1971	SF	14	14	46	884	19.2	71	4
1972	SF	14	14	46	918	20.0	62	**12**
1973	SF	13	13	37	606	16.4	58	2
1974	SF	14	14	29	615	**21.2**	58	6
1975	SF	14	14	44	735	16.7	68	9
1976	SF	14	14	33	457	13.8	55	6
1977	SF	14	14	32	638	19.9	47	5
1979	DET	16	13	14	192	13.7	29	1
Career		140	137	385	6,856	17.8	79	60
