= 1972 All-Pacific-8 Conference football team =

The 1972 All-Pacific-8 Conference football team consists of American football players chosen for All-Pacific-8 Conference teams for the 1972 NCAA University Division football season. The team was selected by the conference's eight head coaches.

== Offensive selections ==
=== Quarterback ===
- Dan Fouts, Oregon (AP-1; UPI-1)

=== Running backs ===
- Kermit Johnson, UCLA (AP-1; UPI-1)
- James McAlister, UCLA (AP-1)
- Anthony Davis, USC (UPI-1)
- Ken Grandberry, Washington State (UPI-2)

=== Tight end ===
- Charle Young, USC (AP-1; UPI-1)
- John Brady, Washington (UPI-2)

=== Wide receivers ===
- Steve Sweeney, Cal (AP-1; UPI-1)
- Greg Specht, Oregon (AP-1; UPI-1)
- Eric Cross, Stanford (UPI-2)

=== Tackles ===
- Pete Adams, USC (AP-1; UPI-1)
- Bruce Walton, UCLA (AP-1; UPI-1)
- Bill Moos, Washington State (AP-1)
- Tim Stokes, Oregon (UPI-2)

=== Guards ===
- Steve Ostermann, Washington State (AP-1; UPI-1)
- Rob Jurgenson, Oregon State (AP-1)
- Younger Klippert, Stanford (UPI-1)

=== Center ===
- Dave Brown, USC (AP-1; UPI-1)

== Defensive selections ==
=== Linemen ===
- John Grant, USC (AP-1; UPI-1)
- Gordy Guinn, Washington (AP-1; UPI-1)
- Jimmy Sims, USC (AP-1; UPI-1)
- Bob Kampa, Cal (AP-1)
- Roger Stillwell, Stanford (UPI-1)
- Cody Jones, San Jose State (UPI-2)
- Jeff Winans, USC (UPI-2)

=== Linebackers ===
- Steve Brown, Oregon State (AP-1; UPI-1)
- Jim Merlo, Stanford (AP-1; UPI-1)
- Richard Wood, USC (AP-1; UPI-1)
- Steve Lebherz, Pacific (UPI-2)
- Gary Larsen, Washington State (UPI-2)
- Charles Anthony, USC (UPI-2)

=== Defensive backs ===
- Allan Ellis, UCLA (AP-1; UPI-1)
- Calvin Jones, Washington (AP-1; UPI-1)
- Randy Poltl, Stanford (AP-1; UPI-1)
- Bill Bartley, Oregon State (AP-1; UPI-2)
- Artimus Parker, USC (UPI-1)
- Tony Bonwell, Washington (UPI-2)
- Charles McCloud, Stanford (UPI-2)
- Jim Lilly, Oregon State (UPI-2)

== Extra teams ==
=== Placekicker ===
- Rod Garcia, Stanford (AP-1)

=== Punter ===
- Bruce Barnes, UCLA (AP-1)

== Key ==
AP = Associated Press, selected by the conference head coaches

UPI = United Press International, selected by UPI from all teams on the Pacific Coast, not limited to the Pac-8 Conference

== See also ==
- 1972 College Football All-America Team
