= Don Manning =

American football player

Don Lee Manning
Profile
- Position: Linebacker

Personal information
- Born: c.1946
- Listed height: 6 ft 2 in (1.88 m)
- Listed weight: 204 lb (93 kg)

Career information
- College: UCLA

Career history
- 1964–1966: UCLA

Awards and highlights
- Consensus All-American (1967); 2× First-team All-Pac-8 (1966, 1967)

Don Manning (born c.1946) is an American former football linebacker at the University of California, Los Angeles. He was a consensus All-American in 1967.

== College career ==
Manning lettered for the UCLA Bruins football team under coach Tommy Prothro during the 1965, 1966 and 1967 seasons. He made 1st team All-Coast team in both the 1966 and 1967 seasons. In his final year, as a 6-foot, 2-inch, 204-pound Linebacker, Manning was recognized as a consensus first-team All-American, having received first-team honors from several publications and organizations including the Walter Camp Foundation, and United Press International (UPI). He was joined on the consensus All-American team by Gary Beban, marking the first time UCLA had two members in the same year. Manning was drafted by the Cincinnati Bengals in the seventeenth round (436th overall) of the 1968 NFL/AFL draft. In 1993, he was inducted into the UCLA Athletics Hall of Fame.
