= Floyd Reese =

American football player, coach, and executive (1948–2021)

Personal information
- Born: August 8, 1948; Springfield, Missouri, U.S.
- Died: August 21, 2021 (aged 73); Brentwood, Tennessee, U.S.

Career information
- College: UCLA
- NFL draft: 1970: undrafted

Career history

Playing
- Montreal Alouettes (1970); Toronto Argonauts (1971)*
- * Offseason or practice squad member only

Coaching
- Liberty Union HS (CA) (1970) Assistant coach; UCLA (1971–1973) Assistant coach; Georgia Tech (1974) Assistant coach; Detroit Lions (1975–1977) Strength and conditioning coach; San Francisco 49ers (1978) Strength and conditioning coach; Minnesota Vikings (1979–1983) Linebackers coach & special teams coach; Minnesota Vikings (1984) Defensive coordinator; Minnesota Vikings (1985) Linebackers coach; Houston Oilers (1986–1989) Linebackers coach

Operations
- Houston Oilers (1990–1993) Assistant general manager; Houston/Tennessee Oilers (1994–1998) Executive vice president & general manager; Tennessee Titans (1999–2000) Executive vice president & general manager; Tennessee Titans (2001–2006) Executive vice president, general manager & director of football operations; New England Patriots (2009–2012) Senior football advisor

Awards and highlights
- Tennessee Titans Ring of Honor; First-team All-American (1969); First-team All-Pac-8 (1969)
- Coaching profile at Pro Football Reference
- Executive profile at Pro Football Reference

Floyd Reese (August 8, 1948 – August 21, 2021) was an American professional football coach and executive in the National Football League (NFL). From 1994 to 2006, he held the position of general manager of the Tennessee Titans. Reese then served as an analyst on ESPN's NFL Live, and as a writer on ESPN.com before joining the New England Patriots as a senior football advisor.

As a general manager, Reese drafted three NFL Rookie of the Year Award winners among his 11 first round draft choices: running back Eddie George in 1996, defensive end Jevon Kearse in 1999, and quarterback Vince Young in 2006. Reese also drafted NFL co-MVP quarterback Steve McNair.

Reese was a star football player at Liberty Union High School, in Brentwood, California. He graduated in 1966. Based on his career achievements he was awarded Graduate of Distinction. He was also inducted into its athletic hall of fame.

== College career ==
Reese was a three-year letterman and three-year starter (making 28 of 30 starts) for the University of California, Los Angeles. He was voted UCLA rookie of the year in 1967.

Reese was part of a Bruins defense that gave up only 103 points (ninth best in school history) and posted an 8–1–1 record his senior year. Reese was an All-American in 1969. He was voted the team co-MVP in 1969 (along with quarterback Dennis Dummit) making him the only defensive player ever to win the award. Reese was also one of UCLA's tri-captains as well as All-Pac-8. He was voted to the Los Angeles Times All-Time UCLA team in 1970. Reese played in the Hula Bowl after his senior season and was voted the game's outstanding lineman.

== Playing career ==
Reese played one season in the Canadian Football League (1970) for the Montreal Alouettes. He signed with the Toronto Argonauts in 1971 but did not play and decided to move into coaching that same year.

== Professional career ==
=== Coaching ===
Reese was an assistant coach at UCLA from 1971 to 1973 and with Georgia Tech in 1974. He was in charge of the Detroit Lions' strength and conditioning with head coaches Rick Forzano and Tommy Hudspeth from 1975 until the latter's dismissal with his entire staff on January 9, 1978. He moved to the San Francisco 49ers as strength and conditioning coach in 1978. Reese became the Minnesota Vikings' linebacker coach and special teams from 1979 though 1983 and was the Vikings' defensive coordinator in 1984. He returned to the post of linebacker coach in 1985. The next season, Reese began a four-year stint as linebacker coach for the Houston Oilers.

=== NFL executive ===
In 1990, Reese was promoted to the position of assistant general manager for the Oilers following an offer from Jerry Glanville, then head coach of the Atlanta Falcons, to join the Falcons as assistant head coach. Bud Adams wanted to keep Reese with the Oilers so he offered Reese the position of assistant general manager and the opportunity to one day replace Mike Holovak, then-Oilers general manager. Reese held that position until 1993.

In 1994, Reese was promoted to executive vice president and general manager, where he stayed while the Oilers moved to Nashville, Tennessee, first as the Tennessee Oilers, then as the Tennessee Titans. He added the role of director of football operations in 2001. After disputes with Adams and coach Jeff Fisher about the direction of the team (Fisher wanted more control in drafts), and realizing that Adams was not likely to offer him a new contract, Reese resigned his position with the Titans following the 2006 season, despite amassing the most wins (111) of any Oilers/Titans general manager.

Following his departure from the Titans, Reese joined ESPN as an NFL analyst and writer for ESPN.com.

On January 27, 2009, Reese was hired by the New England Patriots as a senior football advisor following Patriots vice president of player personnel Scott Pioli leaving to become general manager of the Kansas City Chiefs. Following the 2009 season, Reese was a finalist for the Seattle Seahawks general manager position, one that was eventually filled by John Schneider. Reese left the Patriots after the 2012 season.
