= Tody Smith =

American football player (1948–1999)

No. 85, 70
- Position: Defensive end

Personal information
- Born: December 24, 1948; Frankfurt, Germany
- Died: July 18, 1999 (aged 50); Los Angeles, California, U.S.
- Listed height: 6 ft 5 in (1.96 m)
- Listed weight: 248 lb (112 kg)

Career information
- High school: Charlton-Pollard (Beaumont, Texas, U.S.)
- College: USC
- NFL draft: 1971: 1st round, 25th overall pick

Career history
- Dallas Cowboys (1971–1972); Houston Oilers (1973–1976); Buffalo Bills (1976); Tampa Bay Buccaneers (1977)*
- * Offseason or practice squad member only

Awards and highlights
- Super Bowl champion (VI); Second-team All-American (1970); Second-team All-Pac-8 (1969); Rose Bowl champion - (1970)

Career NFL statistics
- Games played: 69
- Stats at Pro Football Reference

Lawrence "Tody" Edward Smith (December 24, 1948 – July 18, 1999) was an American professional football defensive end in the National Football League (NFL) for the Dallas Cowboys, Houston Oilers and Buffalo Bills. He played college football at the University of Southern California.

== Early life ==
Smith was a prep All-American at Charlton-Pollard High School, where he played for his father W.R. Smith. He acquired his nickname in a junior high school Spanish class, from "El Toro" (bull), because he was the largest boy in his class.

== College career ==
Smith accepted a football scholarship from Michigan State University, following in the footsteps of his older brother Bubba. He transferred to the University of Southern California after his sophomore season, where he became a standout defensive tackle.

Smith teamed in the defensive line with Al Cowlings, Jimmy Gunn, Willard "Bubba" Scott, and Charlie Weaver to form in 1969 "The Wild Bunch," which was key for USC to compile a 10-0-1 record and a No. 3 ranking after a victory over the Michigan Wolverines in the 1970 Rose Bowl.

The Wild Bunch was a hit movie in 1969 and it was Cowlings who dubbed the defensive line 'The Wild Bunch' for their reckless abandon and hard-nosed style of play. Playing in an era of powerful running games, they allowed just 2.3 yards per carry and a league-low 95.6 rushing yards a game.

Smith was one of the five USC African American starters (along with Sam Cunningham, Jimmy Jones, Clarence Davis and Charlie Weaver), that played against an all-white University of Alabama football team, winning 42–21 in Birmingham on September 12, 1970. This game was historically significant, because it was a factor in convincing the University of Alabama and its fan base to accelerate the integration of its football team.

He played two seasons (1969–70) for the Trojans. In 1969, he was honorable-mention All-PAC-8 and in 1970 he was a second-team All-American, even though he played only four games as a senior, after spraining an ankle in the second game.

There is a statue of him and the other four "Wild Bunch" defensive linemen at USC's Heritage Hall. He also appeared in the famed gunslinger photo of the five of them.

== Professional career ==
=== Dallas Cowboys ===
Smith was selected by the Dallas Cowboys in the first round (25th overall) of the 1971 NFL draft, after dropping because of an ankle injury he suffered in college. This injury limited him to only 7 games during his rookie year. He spent the first seven games of the season on the team's taxi squad, but when he joined the regular roster, he showed the Cowboys he had a future in the NFL and even contributed in the Cowboys win in Super Bowl VI.

Although he had surgery during the off-season on an injured knee, head coach Tom Landry seemed convinced Smith had the capability to start in 1972. He had a disappointing second year where he only played 10 games.

On May 9, 1973, he was traded along with wide receiver Billy Parks to the Houston Oilers, in exchange for their first and third round draft picks in the 1974 NFL draft. For the first time in their history, the Dallas Cowboys would have the first overall draft choice which they used to select defensive end Ed "Too Tall" Jones, who would play a key role on the Cowboys Super Bowl teams in the 1970s. With the third-round pick they acquired, the Cowboys selected quarterback Danny White, who became the starting quarterback during the 1980s after the retirement of Roger Staubach.

=== Houston Oilers ===
Smith was a starter for the Houston Oilers for the next 3 seasons, before being waived after he was injured with an ankle sprain in 1976.

=== Buffalo Bills ===
On November 23, 1976, he was claimed off waivers by the Buffalo Bills. He played in only 2 games and retired at the end of the season.

=== Tampa Bay Buccaneers ===
On July 11, 1977, he was signed as a free agent by the Tampa Bay Buccaneers, but was released before the season started on September 1.

== Personal life ==
Smith's brother was actor and former NFL Pro Bowler Bubba Smith. Like his brother, Tody appeared in a few films, including The Hollywood Knights and eventually became his agent. Smith was married to Chae Castillo, a professional model/actress. They had a daughter (Rheo Smith) and a son (Dakota-Navarro Castillo-Smith).

He died in his sleep at his home in Los Angeles on July 18, 1999.
