= Bill Enyart =

American football player (1947–2015)

No. 41, 46
- Positions: Running back, Linebacker

Personal information
- Born: April 28, 1947; Pawhuska, Oklahoma, U.S.
- Died: February 10, 2015 (aged 67); Turner, Oregon, U.S.
- Listed height: 6 ft 4 in (1.93 m)
- Listed weight: 235 lb (107 kg)

Career information
- High school: Medford (Medford, Oregon)
- College: Oregon State
- NFL draft: 1969: 2nd round, 27th overall pick

Career history
- Buffalo Bills (1969–1970); Oakland Raiders (1971); Green Bay Packers (1973)*
- * Offseason or practice squad member only

Awards and highlights
- First-team All-American (1968); Second-team All-American (1967); 2× First-team All-Pac-8 (1967, 1968); Second-team All-Pac-8 (1966); Hula Bowl MVP (1969)

Career NFL/AFL statistics
- Rushing yards: 387
- Rushing average: 3.7
- Receptions: 54
- Receiving yards: 421
- Total touchdowns: 4
- Stats at Pro Football Reference
- College Football Hall of Fame

William Donald Enyart (April 28, 1947 – February 10, 2015), nicknamed "Earthquake", was an American professional football player. He played running back for the Buffalo Bills from 1969 to 1970 and linebacker for the Oakland Raiders in 1971.

== Early life ==
Born in Pawhuska, Oklahoma, Enyart grew up in Medford, Oregon, and was a standout prep athlete at Medford High School. In his three seasons playing varsity football, the "Black Tornado" compiled a 26 record and an A-1 state title in his sophomore season (1962); he also played varsity basketball and baseball and graduated from MHS in 1965.

== College career ==
Enyart played college football for the Oregon State Beavers under head coach Dee Andros, who arrived in Corvallis from Idaho in 1965. After spending his freshman year on the mandatory "Rook" team, he played linebacker as a sophomore in 1966, and was the starting fullback for the famed OSU Giant Killers of 1967. Enyart earned first-team All-Pac-8 Conference honors in 1967 and 1968 and first-team All-American honors in 1968.

In his senior season in 1968, Enyart set a school record with 1,304 yards rushing, while scoring 17 touchdowns, for a total of 102 points. Two of his notable games were on the road against non-conference opponents. Against Utah at Salt Lake City in late September, he carried the ball fifty times for 299 yards and three touchdowns, setting single game school records in both categories; he also tied a school record with four rushing touchdowns against Kentucky at Lexington.

In the three seasons Enyart lettered, the Beavers posted an overall record of 21–8–1 (.717). He was chosen to play in five post-season All-Star games: East-West Shrine Game, Senior Bowl, Coaches All-America Game, College All-Star Game, and the Hula Bowl, where he was named the outstanding back. During his career at Oregon State, he rushed for 2,155 yards, seventh-most ever by a Beaver.

== Professional career ==
Enyart was selected early in the second round of the 1969 NFL/AFL draft (27th overall) by the Buffalo Bills, who took Heisman Trophy-winning halfback O. J. Simpson with the first overall pick. Enyart played in every game in 1969 and 1970, but wanted to play for a team on the West Coast; he was traded to the Oakland Raiders in January 1971 and converted to linebacker.

He injured his left knee in a preseason game against the New York Jets in mid-August, but team doctors advised against surgery. Enyart was activated for only one game, the season finale, but Oakland (8–4–2) was the best team to miss the playoffs. Difficulties continued with the knee and he finally had surgery in October 1972, but never played another game.

== Legacy ==
Enyart was inducted into the Oregon State University Sports Hall of Fame in 1991 and the Oregon Sports Hall of Fame in 2003. In May 2011, he was selected for induction into the College Football Hall of Fame. He eventually settled back in Oregon at Bend to raise his two children, and worked as a Medicaid case worker for the State of Oregon until he retired. Enyart died of cancer at age 67 in Turner in 2015.

== See also ==
- Other American Football League players
