= Greg Jones (running back, born 1948) =

American football player (born 1948)

No. 36
- Position: Running back

Personal information
- Born: February 12, 1948 (age 78); San Francisco, California, U.S.
- Listed height: 6 ft 1 in (1.85 m)
- Listed weight: 201 lb (91 kg)

Career information
- High school: South San Francisco
- College: UCLA
- NFL draft: 1970: 5th round, 129th overall pick

Career history
- Buffalo Bills (1970–1971)

Awards and highlights
- First-team All-Pac-8 (1969); 2× Second-team All-Pac-8 (1967, 1968)

Career NFL statistics
- Rushing attempts: 47
- Rushing yards: 166
- Receptions: 24
- Receiving yards: 202
- Total TDs: 3
- Stats at Pro Football Reference

Gregory Martin Jones (born February 12, 1948) is an American former professional football player who was a running back for the Buffalo Bills of the National Football League (NFL). He played college football for the UCLA Bruins and was selected by the Minnesota Vikings in the fifth round of the 1970 NFL draft. Jones played for the Bills from 1970 to 1971.
