= Fred Khasigian =

American football player

Profile
- Position: Guard

Career information
- College: USC (1967–1969)

Awards and highlights
- 2× First-team All-Pac-8 (1968, 1969); National Football Foundation National Scholar Athlete (1969)

Harry Alfred "Fred" Khasigian is an American former football player, rugby coach, and orthopedic surgeon.

== Early life ==
Khasigian grew up working on his parents' 60-acre grape vineyard in the San Joaquin Valley.

Khasigian played high school football at Selma High School in Selma, California. He played at the fullback and linebacker positions for the Selma Bears football team. He was selected as Selma's most valuable player for three of the four years he played there. At the end of the 1965 season, he was selected as a second-team player on the 1964 Nor-Cal All-Star team published in the San Francisco Chronicle.

Khasigan was also the valedictorian of the Selma High School class of 1966.

== USC ==
Khasigian then enrolled at the University of Southern California (USC) where he played at the offensive guard position for the USC Trojans football team from 1967 to 1969. He was a first-team guard on the All-Pacific Coast football teams in 1968 and 1969. He was also a National Football Foundation National Scholar Athlete in 1969.

While attending USC, he also maintained a 3.7 grade point average as a pre-medical student.

== Later life ==
Khasigian later became an orthopedic surgeon and also coached high school rugby. Six of his high school rugby teams won national championships. He was also inducted into the Armenian American Sports Hall of Fame.
