= Mike Ballou =

American football player (born 1947)

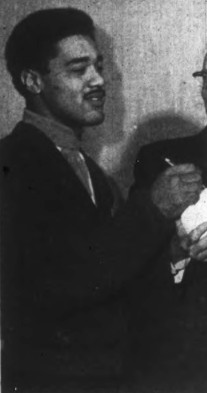
- Ballou in 1969

No. 51
- Position: Linebacker

Personal information
- Born: September 11, 1947 (age 79); Los Angeles, California, U.S.
- Listed height: 6 ft 3 in (1.91 m)
- Listed weight: 238 lb (108 kg)

Career information
- High school: Los Angeles (CA)
- College: UCLA
- NFL draft: 1970: 3rd round, 56th overall pick

Career history
- Boston Patriots (1970)

Awards and highlights
- Consensus All-American (1969); First-team All-Pac-8 (1969); Second-team All-Pac-8 (1968)
- Stats at Pro Football Reference

Mikell Randolph Ballou (born September 11, 1947) is an American former professional football player who was a linebacker in the National Football League (NFL) for the Boston Patriots in 1970. He attended Los Angeles High School, then Santa Monica College and finally the University of California - Los Angeles before being selected by the Patriots in the third round, 56th overall, of the 1970 NFL draft.
