= 1968 All-Pacific-8 Conference football team =

The 1968 All-Pacific-8 Conference football team consists of American football players chosen by the Associated Press (AP), the United Press International (UPI), and the Pacific-8 Conference (Pac-8) coaches (Coaches) as the best college football players by position in the Pac-8 during the 1968 NCAA University Division football season.

The 1968 USC Trojans football team won the Pac-8 championship, were ranked No. 2 in the final Coaches Poll, and placed eight players on the first team: quarterback Steve Sogge (AP-1, UPI-1, Coaches-1); running back O. J. Simpson (AP-1, UPI-1, Coaches-1); end Bob Klein (AP-1, UPI-1, Coaches-1); offensive tackle Sid Smith (AP-1, Coaches-1); offensive guards Fred Khasigian (AP-1, Coaches-1) and Steve Lehmer (UPI-1); defensive end Jimmy Gunn (AP-1, UPI-1, Coaches-1); and defensive back Mike Battle (UPI-1).

== Offensive selections ==
=== Quarterbacks ===
- Steve Sogge, USC (AP-1; UPI-1; Coaches-1)
- Steve Preece, Oregon State (AP-2)
- Jim Plunkett, Stanford (UPI-2)

=== Running backs ===
- Bill Enyart, Oregon State (AP-1; UPI-1; Coaches-1)
- O. J. Simpson, USC (AP-1; UPI-1; Coaches-1)
- Gene Washington, Stanford (AP-1; UPI-1)
- Billy Main, Oregon State (AP-2; UPI-2)
- Greg Jones, UCLA (AP-2; UPI-2)
- John McGaffie, California (AP-2)
- Carl Wojciechowski, Washington (UPI-2)

=== Ends ===
- Bob Klein, USC (AP-1; UPI-1; Coaches-1)
- Wayne Stewart, California (AP-1; UPI-1; Coaches-1)
- Ron Souza, Washington State (AP-2; UPI-2)
- Roger Cantlon, Oregon State (AP-2)
- Ron Copeland, UCLA (UPI-2)

=== Tackles ===
- Malcolm Snider, Stanford (AP-1; UPI-1; Coaches-1)
- Sid Smith, USC (AP-1; Coaches-1)
- Roger Stalick, Oregon State (AP-2; UPI-1)
- Dave Golinsky, Washington State (AP-2)
- Jack O'Malley, USC (UPI-2)
- George Buehler, Stanford (UPI-2)

=== Guards ===
- Fred Khasigian, USC (AP-1; UPI-2; Coaches-1)
- Clyde Smith, Oregon State (AP-2; Coaches-1)
- Steve Lehmer, USC (AP-2; UPI-1)
- Nick Shur, Oregon (AP-1)
- Rocky Rasley, Oregon State (UPI-1)
- Jim Harris, Washington (UPI-2)

=== Centers ===
- John Didion, Oregon State (AP-1; UPI-1; Coaches-1)
- Dick Allmon, USC (AP-2; UPI-2)

== Defensive selections ==
=== Defensive ends ===
- Jimmy Gunn, USC (AP-1; UPI-1; Coaches-1)
- Mike McCaffrey, California (AP-1; UPI-2; Coaches-1)
- Irby Augustine, California (AP-2; UPI-1)
- Otis Washington, Washington (AP-2; UPI-2)

=== Defensive tackles ===
- Larry Agajanian, UCLA (AP-1; UPI-1; Coaches-1)
- Jon Sandstrom, Oregon State (AP-1; UPI-1; Coaches-1)
- Ron Boley, Oregon State (AP-2; UPI-2)
- Tony Terry, USC (AP-2)
- Al Cowlings, USC (UPI-2)

=== Middle guard ===
- Ed White, California (AP-1; UPI-1; Coaches-1)
- George Dames, Oregon (AP-1; Coaches-1; UPI-2)
- George Buehler, Stanford (AP-2)
- Steve Bartelie, Washington State (AP-2)

=== Linebackers ===
- George Jugum, Washington (AP-1; UPI-1; Coaches-1)
- Don Parish, Stanford (AP-1; UPI-1; Coaches-1)
- Mike Ballou, UCLA (AP-2; UPI-2)
- Dennis Pitta, California (AP-2)

=== Defensive backs ===
- Ken Wiedemann, California (AP-1; UPI-1 Coaches-1)
- Al Worley, Washington (AP-1; UPI-1; Coaches-1)
- Omri Hildreth, Oregon (AP-2 [defensive back]; Coaches-1 [defensive back]; UPI-2 [linebacker])
- Mark Gustafson, UCLA (AP-2; UPI-1)
- Mike Battle, USC (UPI-1)
- Mike Williams, Washington State (AP-1)
- Charlie Olds, Oregon State (AP-2)
- Rudy Redmond, Pacific (UPI-2)
- Rick Reed, Washington State (UPI-2)
- Steve Hilbert, Oregon (UPI-2)

== Key ==
AP = Associated Press

UPI = United Press International

Coaches = selected by the eight head coaches of the Pacific-8 Conference

== See also ==
- 1968 College Football All-America Team
