= Jimmy Gunn =

American football player (1948–2015)

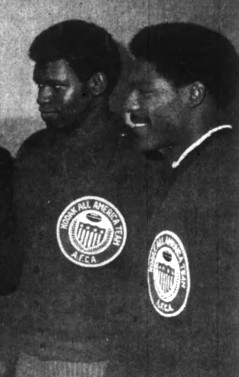
- Gunn (left) with Jack Tatum (right) in 1969

No. 30, 58
- Position: Linebacker

Personal information
- Born: November 27, 1948; Augusta, Arkansas, U.S.
- Died: April 11, 2015 (aged 66); Los Angeles, California, U.S.
- Listed height: 6 ft 1 in (1.85 m)
- Listed weight: 220 lb (100 kg)

Career information
- High school: Lincoln (San Diego, California)
- College: USC
- NFL draft: 1970: 13th round, 314th overall pick

Career history
- Chicago Bears (1970–1975); New York Giants (1975); Tampa Bay Buccaneers (1976)

Awards and highlights
- National champion (1967); Consensus All-American (1969); Second-team All-American (1968); 2× First-team All-Pac-8 (1968, 1969); Second-team All-Pac-8 (1967)

Career NFL statistics
- Sacks: 4
- Fumble recoveries: 2
- Interceptions: 2
- Stats at Pro Football Reference

Jimmy Gunn (November 27, 1948 – April 11, 2015) was an American professional football linebacker in the National Football League (NFL). He was born in Augusta, Arkansas. He prepped at Lincoln High School in San Diego.

== College career ==
Gunn was a 1969 All-American defensive end at the University of Southern California. He also was All-Pac-8, and in USC's Hall of Fame.

In 1969, he teamed with All-Americans Al Cowlings, Charlie Weaver, Tody Smith, and Bubba Scott to form a defensive front that powered the Trojans to 10–0–1 record and a win over the University of Michigan in the 1970 Rose Bowl. Coach John McKay credited a six-man front on defense for the victory, big Tony Terry was added to the group known as the "Wild Bunch" consisting of Jimmy Gunn, Charlie Weaver, Al Cowlings, Tody Smith and Bubba Scott.

== Professional career ==
Gunn played professionally for the Chicago Bears, New York Giants and Tampa Bay Buccaneers between 1970 and 1976.

== Death ==
Gunn died of heart failure on April 11, 2015.
