= Jeff Winans =

American football player (1951–2012)

No. 75, 73, 62
- Position: Guard

Personal information
- Born: October 12, 1951; Turlock, California, U.S.
- Died: December 21, 2012 (aged 61); Turlock, California, U.S.
- Listed height: 6 ft 5 in (1.96 m)
- Listed weight: 265 lb (120 kg)

Career information
- High school: Turlock (CA)
- College: USC
- NFL draft: 1973: 2nd round, 32nd overall pick

Career history
- Buffalo Bills (1973, 1975); New Orleans Saints (1976); Tampa Bay Buccaneers (1977–1978)

Awards and highlights
- Super Bowl champion (XV); National champion (1972); Second-team All-Pac-8 (1972)
- Stats at Pro Football Reference

Jeff Winans (October 12, 1951 – December 21, 2012) was an American professional football guard. He played for the Buffalo Bills in 1973 and 1975, the New Orleans Saints in 1976, and the Tampa Bay Buccaneers from 1977 to 1978.

Winans died of mixed drug intoxication and cardiomyopathy on December 21, 2012, in Turlock, California at age 61. He is one of at least 345 NFL players to be diagnosed after death with chronic traumatic encephalopathy (CTE), which is caused by repeated hits to the head.
