= Jimmy Sims =

American football player (born 1953)

Jim Sims
No. 55
- Position: Linebacker

Personal information
- Born: December 28, 1953 (age 72); Galveston, Texas, U.S.
- Listed height: 6 ft 0 in (1.83 m)
- Listed weight: 195 lb (88 kg)

Career information
- High school: Alain Leroy Locke (CA)
- College: USC
- NFL draft: 1974: 12th round, 288th overall pick

Career history
- New York Stars/Charlotte Hornets (1974); Southern California Sun (1975); Tampa Bay Buccaneers (1976)

Awards and highlights
- 2× First-team All-Pac-8 (1972, 1973)
- Stats at Pro Football Reference

James Sims (born December 28, 1953) is a former National Football League (NFL) linebacker who played for the Tampa Bay Buccaneers in 1976. He attended Locke High School, Los Angeles Harbor College and the University of Southern California before being selected by the New York Giants in the 12th round (288th overall) in the 1974 NFL draft. Sims was a 19th round (225th overall) of the Hawaiians in the 1974 WFL College draft. However, Sims played for the New York Stars and Charlotte Hornets of the World Football League in 1974. The Hornets traded Sims to the Southern California Sun (WFL) in 1975.
