= Pete Adams =

American football player (1951–2019)

No. 69
- Position: Guard

Personal information
- Born: May 4, 1951; San Diego, California, U.S.
- Died: April 6, 2019 (aged 67); Encinitas, California, U.S.
- Listed height: 6 ft 4 in (1.93 m)
- Listed weight: 260 lb (118 kg)

Career information
- College: USC
- NFL draft: 1973: 1st round, 22nd overall pick

Career history
- Cleveland Browns (1974–1976)

Awards and highlights
- National champion (1972); First-team All-American (1972); First-team All-Pac-8 (1972)

Career NFL statistics
- Games played: 25
- Games started: 22
- Stats at Pro Football Reference

Peter Anthony Adams (May 4, 1951 – April 6, 2019) was an American professional football player who was a guard for the Cleveland Browns of the National Football League (NFL).

== Early life ==
Adams prepped at University of San Diego High School.

== College career ==
Adams played college football at the University of Southern California after transferring from San Diego City College.

== Professional career ==
Adams played four seasons in the NFL with the Cleveland Browns.
