= Mike Battle =

American football player (1946–2025)

No. 40
- Position: Safety

Personal information
- Born: July 9, 1946; South Gate, California, U.S.
- Died: March 6, 2025 (aged 78); Nellysford, Virginia, U.S.
- Listed height: 6 ft 1 in (1.85 m)
- Listed weight: 175 lb (79 kg)

Career information
- High school: Lawndale (CA)
- College: USC
- NFL draft: 1969: 12th round, 311th overall pick

Career history
- New York Jets (1969–1970)

Awards and highlights
- National champion (1967); First-team All-American (1968); Second-team All-American (1967); 2× First-team All-Pac-8 (1967, 1968); Second-team All-Pac-8 (1966)

Career NFL statistics
- Games played: 28
- Games started: 0
- Interceptions: 1
- Stats at Pro Football Reference

Michael Leonard Battle (July 9, 1946 – March 6, 2025) was an American professional football player who was a safety for the New York Jets in the American Football League (AFL) and National Football League (NFL). He played college football for the USC Trojans, twice earning All-American honors. He played for the Jets in 1969 and 1970. Battle saw most of his action with the Jets as a punt and kickoff return specialist.

Battle appeared in the film C.C. and Company (1970) in the role as Rabbit, which starred Joe Namath, then starting quarterback of the New York Jets. He died in Nellysford, Virginia, on March 6, 2025, at the age of 78.

== See also ==
- List of NCAA major college yearly punt and kickoff return leaders
- List of American Football League players
