= Brent Moore =

American football player (born 1963)

No. 98
- Position: Linebacker

Personal information
- Born: January 9, 1963 (age 63); Novato, California, U.S.
- Listed height: 6 ft 5 in (1.96 m)
- Listed weight: 242 lb (110 kg)

Career information
- High school: San Marin
- College: USC (1982–1985)
- NFL draft: 1986: 9th round, 236th overall pick

Career history
- Green Bay Packers (1986–1988)

Career NFL statistics
- Games played: 4
- Stats at Pro Football Reference

Brent Allen Moore (born January 9, 1963) is an American former professional football player. A linebacker, he played college football for the USC Trojans as a linebacker and defensive end before being selected by the Green Bay Packers in the ninth round of the 1986 NFL draft. He spent the 1986 season and part of the 1987 season on injured reserve before returning mid-season and playing in four games. He later spent 1988 injured before being released in 1989.

== Early life ==
Moore was born on January 9, 1963, in Novato, California. He attended San Marin High School where he played football as a tight end and defensive tackle. He was selected All-Marin County Athletic League at defensive tackle as a junior and senior and also was named second-team All-Marin County Athletic League at tight end as a senior. A three-year starter at San Marin, he totaled 53 tackles and 12 receptions for 151 yards in his last year. Moore graduated from San Marin in 1981 and afterwards enrolled at the University of Southern California (USC) to play for the USC Trojans.

== College career ==
Moore was a backup linebacker for the Trojans in the 1982 and 1983 seasons. Four games into the 1984 season, he moved to defensive end and became a starter due to injuries to USC's players. He started seven of the last eight games, totaling 29 tackles, two sacks and a fumble recovery. In the 1985 Rose Bowl against the favored Ohio State Buckeyes, he made a key play in forcing a fumble by Mike Tomczak late in the game, resulting in a failed fourth down attempt that sealed USC's 20–17 victory. Moore remained a starter at defensive end for the Trojans in 1985, though he was limited by a thumb injury and wore a cast for five games. He was an Academic All-American and the recipient of USC's Howard Jones Incentive Award for best improvement in grade-point average (GPA). Moore graduated from USC in 1986 with a Bachelor of Science degree in business administration.

== Professional career ==
Moore was selected by the Green Bay Packers in the ninth round (236th overall) of the 1986 NFL draft. He was one of two USC defensive ends selected by the Packers, along with Matt Koart, though he later converted to linebacker. He suffered a toe injury on the first day of practice that worsened during training camp and preseason. As a result, the Packers placed him on injured reserve prior to the regular season. Moore returned in 1987 but was placed on injured reserve again to start the season. He was activated on October 31 and made his NFL debut the following day against the Tampa Bay Buccaneers. He appeared in the next three games and concluded the season with four games played. However, Moore was placed on injured reserve for a third time to start the 1988 season, then was released in July 1989, ending his professional career.
