= Nate Shaw =

American football player and coach (born 1945)

No. 44
- Position: Safety

Personal information
- Born: May 20, 1945 (age 81); San Diego, California, U.S.
- Listed height: 6 ft 2 in (1.88 m)
- Listed weight: 205 lb (93 kg)

Career information
- High school: Lincoln (San Diego, California)
- College: USC
- NFL draft: 1967: 5th round, 122nd overall pick

Career history

Playing
- Los Angeles Rams (1969–1970)

Coaching
- Oregon State (1976–1979) Defensive backs coach; USC (1980–1986) Defensive backs coach

Awards and highlights
- Consensus All-American (1966); 2× First-team All-Pac-8 (1965, 1966)
- Stats at Pro Football Reference

Regarding the as-told-to autobiography All God's Dangers The Life of Nate Shaw, see Ned Cobb.

Nathaniel Shaw (born May 20, 1945) is an American former professional football player who was a defensive back for the Los Angeles Rams of the National Football League (NFL). He played college football for the USC Trojans. After his playing career, Shaw was a college assistant coach.

== Playing career ==
Shaw was born in San Diego, California and graduated from Abraham Lincoln High School. He went on to play college football at USC, where he was a defensive back and was named to the All-Pac-10 team in 1965 and was a consensus All-American in 1966. He was selected in the fifth round of the 1967 NFL/AFL draft by the Los Angeles Rams and played two seasons with the Rams.

== Coaching career ==
After retiring from playing football, Shaw coached defensive backs at Oregon State from 1976 to 1979, and then at his alma mater USC for 7 years from 1980 to 1986.

== Personal life ==
Following his coaching career, Shaw worked in hotel sales and ran a plumbing business. He is the brother of former NFL and college assistant coach Willie Shaw and the uncle of former Stanford head coach David Shaw.
