= Matt Koart =

American football player (born 1963)

No. 92
- Position: Defensive end

Personal information
- Born: September 28, 1963 (age 63); Goleta, California, U.S.
- Listed height: 6 ft 5 in (1.96 m)
- Listed weight: 257 lb (117 kg)

Career information
- High school: Dos Pueblos (Goleta)
- College: USC (1981–1985)
- NFL draft: 1986: 5th round, 125th overall pick

Career history
- Green Bay Packers (1986)

Awards and highlights
- Second-team All-Pac-10 (1985)

Career NFL statistics
- Fumble recoveries: 1
- Stats at Pro Football Reference

Matthew W. Koart (born November 28, 1963) is an American former professional football player. He played college football for the USC Trojans, earning second-team All-Pac-10 Conference honors as a senior in 1985. He was selected by the Green Bay Packers in the fifth round of the 1986 NFL draft and played one season as a defensive end for them before retiring. After his football career, he became a real estate executive.

== Early life ==
Koart was born on November 28, 1963, in Goleta, California. Koart's father Bill, who played minor league baseball, died when he was 12. He attended Dos Pueblos High School where he played football as a two-way tackle. As a senior in 1980, he was selected first-team All-Channel League and second-team All-California Interscholastic Federation (CIF). Koart also served as team captain at Dos Pueblos. He was invited to the Santa Barbara County All-Star Game and signed to play college football for the USC Trojans in 1981.

== College career ==
Koart redshirted in 1981; he then lettered for the football team from 1982 to 1985. He entered school at a weight of 217 pounds (98 kg) to play defensive tackle, being very small for the position. He recalled that "I was trying to fend off linemen like Roy Foster and Bruce Matthews and I was getting killed". Koart thus decided to increase his weight, telling the Los Angeles Times that "I used to stuff myself so bad. I'd take a weight-gaining powder, put two bananas in it, grind it up and then shove it down my throat – 2,000 calories. And that was after I ate". He eventually rose to a weight of 260 pounds (120 kg) and became one of USC's top linemen.

As a sophomore in 1983, Koart missed four games due to a sprained ankle. He posted 23 tackles in the 1984 season before tearing knee ligaments, requiring surgery and ending his season. He then started every game and served as team captain for a USC team in 1985 that compiled a record of 6–6. Koart totaled 86 tackles and three sacks during the season. He was selected second-team All-Pac-10 Conference and was named an Academic All-American. Koart concluded his collegiate career with a 177 tackles and nine sacks and was invited to the East–West Shrine Game. He was the recipient of USC's Howard Jones/Football Alumni Club Award for highest grade-point average (GPA) among senior football players and graduated in 1986 with a degree in finance.

== Professional career and later life ==
Koart was selected by the Green Bay Packers in the fifth round (125th overall) of the 1986 NFL draft. His teammate, defensive end Brent Moore, was also selected by the Packers. Although his mother and agent preferred him to attend law school, he said that he "want[ed] to play football" and signed with the Packers in July 1986. With Green Bay, Koart became a defensive end. He impressed the Packers in training camp and made the final roster. He made his NFL debut in Week 1 against the Houston Oilers and appeared in the Packers' first six games. After six games, all of which were losses, the Packers released him, a decision that Koart said "shocked" him. Although he had offers to tryout for other teams, Koart decided to retire to enter law school and began working as a clerk for a law firm.

Koart graduated magna cum laude from the Marshall School of Business at USC and later graduated fourth in his class from USC's Gould School of Law. He worked as a real estate attorney and then became an executive with homebuilding companies. He founded Koart Residential, Inc., a group of privately held real estate companies, and served as the chief executive officer for real estate development firm Shapell Industries, Inc. Koart worked various roles for PulteGroup from 1996 to 2008 and returned in 2023 as the company's executive vice president and chief operating officer. In 2024, he was inducted into the California Homebuilding Foundation Hall of Fame. He is married and has three children.
