= Mike Taylor (offensive tackle) =

American football player (1945–2015)

No. 77, 78, 68, 73
- Position: Offensive tackle

Personal information
- Born: May 5, 1945; San Francisco, California, U.S.
- Died: November 18, 2015 (aged 70); El Dorado Hills, California, U.S.
- Listed height: 6 ft 4 in (1.93 m)
- Listed weight: 255 lb (116 kg)

Career information
- High school: duPont Manual (Louisville, Kentucky)
- College: USC (1966-1967)
- NFL draft: 1968: 1st round, 10th overall pick

Career history
- Pittsburgh Steelers (1968–1969); New Orleans Saints (1969–1970); Washington Redskins (1971); St. Louis Cardinals (1973); Portland Storm (1974); Shreveport Steamer (1975)

Awards and highlights
- National champion (1967); Second-team All-Pac-8 (1967)

Career NFL statistics
- Games played: 46
- Games started: 15
- Fumble recoveries: 3
- Stats at Pro Football Reference

Michael Ray Taylor (May 15, 1945 – November 18, 2015) was an American football offensive tackle in the National Football League (NFL).

== College career ==
Taylor played college football at the University of Southern California and was drafted in the first round (tenth pick overall) of the 1968 NFL/AFL draft by the Pittsburgh Steelers.

== Professional career ==
Taylor played in the National Football League for six seasons.
