= Sid Smith (offensive lineman) =

American football player (born 1948)

No. 70, 77
- Positions: Center, Tackle

Personal information
- Born: July 6, 1948 (age 78); Wichita, Kansas, U.S.
- Listed height: 6 ft 4 in (1.93 m)
- Listed weight: 260 lb (118 kg)

Career information
- High school: Woodrow Wilson (CA)
- College: USC (1966-1969)
- NFL draft: 1970: 1st round, 26th overall pick

Career history
- Kansas City Chiefs (1970–1973); Houston Oilers (1974)

Awards and highlights
- First-team All-American (1969); 2× First-team All-Pac-8 (1968, 1969)

Career NFL statistics
- Games played: 53
- Games started: 8
- Fumble recoveries: 1
- Stats at Pro Football Reference

Sidney Ercil Smith (born July 6, 1948) is an American former professional football player who was an offensive lineman for the Kansas City Chiefs and the Houston Oilers of the National Football League (NFL). Smith was selected by the Chiefs in the first round of the 1970 NFL draft, the team's first pick since their alignment to the NFL. He played college football for the USC Trojans.
