= Greg Slough =

American football player (born 1948)

No. 58, 45
- Position: Linebacker

Personal information
- Born: February 26, 1948 (age 78); Detroit, Michigan, U.S.
- Listed height: 6 ft 3 in (1.91 m)
- Listed weight: 230 lb (104 kg)

Career information
- High school: San Diego (CA) Point Loma
- College: USC
- NFL draft: 1971: 6th round, 149th overall pick

Career history
- Oakland Raiders (1971–1972)

Awards and highlights
- Second-team All-Pac-8 (1969)
- Stats at Pro Football Reference

Greg Slough (born February 26, 1948) is an American former professional football linebacker. He played for the Oakland Raiders from 1971 to 1972.
