= Rod Sherman =

American football player (1944–2024)

No. 23, 13, 84, 86
- Position: Wide receiver

Personal information
- Born: December 25, 1944; Pasadena, California, U.S.
- Died: February 6, 2024 (aged 79)
- Listed height: 6 ft 0 in (1.83 m)
- Listed weight: 190 lb (86 kg)

Career information
- High school: John Muir (Pasadena)
- College: UCLA; USC
- NFL draft: 1966: 4th round, 54th overall pick
- AFL draft: 1966: Red Shirt 1st round, 7th overall pick

Career history
- Oakland Raiders (1967); Cincinnati Bengals (1968); Oakland Raiders (1969–1971); Denver Broncos (1972); Los Angeles Rams (1973)

Awards and highlights
- AFL champion (1967); First-team All-Pac-8 (1966)

Career NFL/AFL statistics
- Receptions: 105
- Receiving yards: 1,576
- Receiving touchdowns: 5
- Stats at Pro Football Reference

Rodney Jarvis Sherman (December 25, 1944 – February 6, 2024) was an American professional football player who was a wide receiver in the American Football League (AFL) and National Football League (NFL). He played college football for the USC Trojans.

== Early life ==
Sherman attended John Muir High School in Pasadena, California.

== College career ==
Sherman played college football at the University of Southern California. He was an All-Pac-8 selection in 1966.

== Professional career ==
Sherman played for the AFL's Oakland Raiders (1967, 1969) and Cincinnati Bengals (1968) and for the NFL's Raiders (1970–1971), Denver Broncos (1972) and Los Angeles Rams (1973).

== Death ==
Sherman died on February 6, 2024, at the age of 79.

== See also ==
- Other American Football League players
