= Charlie Weaver =

American football player (born 1949)

No. 59, 58
- Position: Linebacker

Personal information
- Born: July 12, 1949 (age 77); Greenwood, Mississippi, U.S.
- Listed height: 6 ft 2 in (1.88 m)
- Listed weight: 220 lb (100 kg)

Career information
- High school: Richmond (Richmond, California)
- College: USC Trojans
- NFL draft: 1971: 2nd round, 48th overall pick

Career history
- Detroit Lions (1971–1981); Washington Redskins (1981)

Awards and highlights
- Consensus All-American (1970); First-team All-Pac-8 (1970); Second-team All-Pac-8 (1969)

Career NFL statistics
- Games played: 147
- Interceptions: 15
- Fumble recoveries: 11
- Stats at Pro Football Reference

Charles Earl Weaver Jr. (born July 12, 1949) is an American former professional football player who was a linebacker in the National Football League (NFL). He played college football for the USC Trojans.

== Early life ==
Weaver was born in Greenwood, Mississippi and attended Richmond High School in Richmond, California.

== College career ==
Weaver was a 1970 All-American defensive end at the University of Southern California. He was also All-Pac-8, USC's Most Inspirational Player in 1970.

In 1969, he teamed with Al Cowlings and Jimmy Gunn, and the late Tody Smith and Bubba Scott to form a defensive front that powered the Trojans to 10-0-1 record and a win over the University of Michigan in the 1970 Rose Bowl. Coach John McKay credited a six-man front on defense for the victory, big Tony Terry was added to the group known as the "Wild Bunch" consisting of Jimmy Gunn, Charlie Weaver, Al Cowlings, Tody Smith and Bubba Scott.

== Professional career ==
Weaver was selected in the second round of the 1971 NFL draft by the Detroit Lions, where he played for 10 seasons. He also played for the Washington Redskins in 1981.
