= 1975 New York Giants season =

NFL team season

- Owner: Wellington Mara
- Head coach: Bill Arnsparger
- Home stadium: Shea Stadium

Results
- Record: 5–9
- Division place: 4th NFC East
- Playoffs: Did not qualify
- Pro Bowlers: None

The 1975 New York Giants season was the franchise's 51st season in the National Football League. The Giants finished with a 5–9 record that was nonetheless a three-win improvement upon their performance at the Yale Bowl in 1974. They played their home games at Shea Stadium in Flushing Meadows, Queens, and had a new logo on their helmet, replacing the old lower case “ny” to a stylized white and blue uppercase “NY”. Like Shea Stadium, this uppercase "NY" logo lasted for just this season only.

== Offseason ==
=== NFL draft ===
Round	Pick	Player	Position	School
2	27	Al Simpson	Guard	Colorado State
3	62	Danny Buggs	Wide Receiver	West Virginia
4	79	Robert Giblin	Defensive Back	Houston
7	158	Jim Obradovich	Tight End	USC
8	183	John Tate	Linebacker	Jackson State

== Personnel ==
=== Staff ===
1975 New York Giants staff
Front office: Co-Owner - Tim Mara; Co-Owner / President – Wellington Mara; General manager / Director of Operations – Andy Robustelli; Director of Player Personnel - Jim Lee Howell; Director of Pro Personnel – Jim Trimble; Scouts - Roosevelt Brown, Ken Kavanaugh; Head coaches: Head coach – Bill Arnsparger; Offensive coaches: Offensive Backfield – Ted Plumb; Running Backs - Allan Webb; Wide Receivers - Hunter Enis; Offensive Line – Ray Wietecha	Defensive coaches: Defensive Line – Floyd Peters; Linebackers – Marty Schottenheimer; Defensive Backfield – Jim Symank; Special teams coaches: Kickers coach – Ed Rutledge

=== Roster ===
1975 New York Giants roster
Quarterbacks (QB): 15 Craig Morton; 19 Carl Summerell; 17 Mike Wells; Running backs (RB): 26 Joe Dawkins; 30 Ron Johnson; 44 Doug Kotar; 36 Larry Watkins; 29 Marsh White; Wide receivers (WR): 86 Danny Buggs; 88 Don Clune; 84 Walker Gillette; 82 Ray Rhodes; Tight ends (TE): 89 Jim Obradovich; 38 Bob Tucker	Offensive linemen (OL): 61 Karl Chandler G/C; 74 John Hicks G; 70 Bob Hyland C; 73 Tom Mullen G/T; 67 Dave Simonson T; 79 Al Simpson T/G; 63 Doug Van Horn T; 69 Willie Young T; Defensive linemen (DL): 66 Rick Dvorak DT; 71 Dave Gallagher DE; 81 Jack Gregory DE; 75 George Martin DE; 76 Jim Pietrzak DT; 72 Bill Windauer DT	Linebackers (LB): 58 Jimmy Gunn OLB; 56 Pat Hughes OLB; 55 Brian Kelley MLB; 59 Bob Schmit MLB; 57 Andy Selfridge OLB; 10 Brad Van Pelt OLB; Defensive backs (DB): 37 Bobby Brooks CB; 35 Rondy Colbert CB; 27 Charlie Ford CB; 28 Robert Giblin SS; 43 Spider Lockhart FS; 39 Clyde Powers SS; 20 Jim Stienke CB/FS; Special teams (ST): 9 George Hunt K; 13 Dave Jennings P	Reserve: 33 Steve Crosby RB (IR); 75 Larry Jacobson DT (IR); 64 John Mendenhall DT (IR); 48 Henry Stuckey CB (IR); -- John Tate LB (IR); Rookies in italics

== Regular season ==
=== Schedule ===
Week	Date	Opponent	Result	Record	Attendance
1	September 21	at **Philadelphia Eagles**	**W** 23–14	1–0	60,798
2	September 28	at **Washington Redskins**	**L** 13–49	1–1	54,953
3	October 5	at **St. Louis Cardinals**	**L** 14–26	1–2	44,919
4	October 12	**Dallas Cowboys**	**L** 7–13	1–3	56,511
5	October 20	at Buffalo Bills	**W** 17–14	2–3	79,428
6	October 25	**St. Louis Cardinals**	**L** 13–20	2–4	49,598
7	November 1	San Diego Chargers	**W** 35–24	3–4	52,032
8	November 9	**Washington Redskins**	**L** 13–21	3–5	57,242
9	November 16	**Philadelphia Eagles**	**L** 10–13	3–6	53,434
10	November 23	at Green Bay Packers	**L** 14–40	3–7	50,150
11	November 30	at **Dallas Cowboys**	**L** 3–14	3–8	53,329
12	December 7	Baltimore Colts	**L** 0–21	3–9	49,863
13	December 14	New Orleans Saints	**W** 28–14	4–9	40,150
14	December 21	at San Francisco 49ers	**W** 26–23	5–9	34,354

Note: Intra-division opponents are in bold text.

=== Standings ===
NFC East
	W	L	T	PCT	DIV	CONF	PF	PA	STK
St. Louis Cardinals^{(3)}	11	3	0	.786	6–2	9–2	356	276	W3
Dallas Cowboys^{(4)}	10	4	0	.714	6–2	8–3	350	268	W2
Washington Redskins	8	6	0	.571	4–4	7–4	325	276	L2
New York Giants	5	9	0	.357	1–7	3–8	216	306	W2
Philadelphia Eagles	4	10	0	.286	3–5	4–7	225	302	W1

NFC Central
	W	L	T	PCT	DIV	CONF	PF	PA	STK
Minnesota Vikings^{(1)}	12	2	0	.857	5–1	8–2	377	180	W1
Detroit Lions	7	7	0	.500	4–2	6–5	245	262	L1
Chicago Bears	4	10	0	.286	2–4	4–7	191	379	W1
Green Bay Packers	4	10	0	.286	1–5	4–7	226	285	W1

NFC West
	W	L	T	PCT	DIV	CONF	PF	PA	STK
Los Angeles Rams^{(2)}	12	2	0	.857	5–1	9–2	312	135	W6
San Francisco 49ers	5	9	0	.357	3–3	4–7	255	286	L4
Atlanta Falcons	4	10	0	.286	3–3	3–8	240	289	L1
New Orleans Saints	2	12	0	.143	1–5	2–9	165	360	L7

=== Game summaries ===
==== Week 5: at Buffalo Bills ====
Quarter	1	2	3	4	Total
**Giants**	0	7	0	10	**17**
Bills	7	7	0	0	**14**

at Rich Stadium, Orchard Park, New York

- Date: Monday, October 20
- Game time: 9:00 p.m.
- Game weather: 50 °F (10 °C), wind 13 miles per hour (21 km/h; 11 kn)
- TV announcers (ABC): Frank Gifford, Alex Karras & Howard Cosell
- Pro-Football-Reference.com

Game information

**First quarter**

- BUF – O.J. Simpson 1 yard run (John Leypoldt kick) – **Bills 7–0**

**Second quarter**

- BUF – J.D. Hill 13 yard pass from Joe Ferguson (John Leypoldt kick) – **Bills 14–0**
- NYG – Ray Rhodes 20 yard pass from Craig Morton (George Hunt kick) – **Bills 14–7**

**Fourth quarter**

- NYG – Ron Johnson 13 yard run (George Hunt kick) – **Tied 14–14**
- NYG – George Hunt 37 yard field goal – **Giants 17–14**

**Giants**

- Craig Morton
  15/21, 220 Yds, TD, INT
- Ron Johnson
  13 Rush, 77 Yds, TD
- Ray Rhodes
  5 Rec, 83 Yds, TD

**Bills**

- Joe Ferguson
  11/19, 147 Yds, TD, 2 INT
- O.J. Simpson
  34 Rush, 126 Yds, TD
- J.D. Hill
  4 Rec, 51 Yds, TD

== See also ==
- List of New York Giants seasons
