= New York Giants all-time roster (Kin–Z) =

1,967 players have appeared in at least one regular season or postseason game in the National Football League (NFL) for the New York Giants since 1925. This list includes those whose last names fall between "Kin" and "Z". For the rest of the players, see New York Giants all-time roster (A–Kim). This list is accurate through the end of the 2025 NFL season.

== Kin-Ky ==
- Terry Kinard
- Gordon King
- Jerome King
- Phil King
- Tavarres King
- Carl Kinscherf
- John Kirby
- Lou Kirouac
- Dutch Kitzmiller
- Mathias Kiwanuka
- Jiggs Kline
- Mike Klotovich
- Pat Knight
- Sammy Knight
- Mickey Kobrosky
- Adam Koets
- Ed Kolman
- Ross Kolodziej
- Younghoe Koo
- Joe Koontz
- Walter Koppisch
- Doug Kotar
- Rich Kotite
- Ernie Koy, Jr.
- Brian Kozlowski
- Jim Krahl
- Matt Kranchick
- Bob Kratch
- Max Krause
- Casey Kreiter
- Ray Krouse
- Jake Kubas
- Ryan Kuehl
- Markus Kuhn
- Troy Kyles

== L ==
- Matt LaCosse
- Kenny Ladler
- Chet Lagod
- Scott Laidlaw
- Roland Lakes
- Roger LaLonde
- Niko Lalos
- Sean Landeta
- Tom Landry
- Eric Lane
- Gary Lane
- Grenny Lansdell
- Myron Lapka
- Greg Larson
- John Lascari
- Greg Lasker
- Frank Lasky
- Dick Lasse
- Cody Latimer
- Kyle Lauletta
- Dexter Lawrence
- Marcus Lawrence
- Justin Layne
- Raheem Layne
- Clarence LeBlanc
- Ed Lechner
- Tuffy Leemans
- Lance LeGree
- Shane Lemieux
- Jim Leo
- Dorsey Levens
- Bashir Levingston
- Art Lewis
- Dan Lewis
- Dion Lewis
- Kevin Lewis
- Roger Lewis
- Ryan Lewis
- Thomas Lewis
- Frank Liebel
- Don Lieberum
- Jeremy Lincoln
- Joe Lindahl
- Chris Linnin
- Tony Lippett
- Jim Little
- Cliff Livingston
- Howie Livingston
- Dan Lloyd
- Drew Lock
- Carl "Spider" Lockhart
- Sean Locklear
- Buford Long
- Tom Longo
- Jared Lorenzen
- Billy Lott
- Julian Love
- Walt Love
- Edwin Lovelady
- John LoVetere
- Frank LoVuolo
- Wayne Lucier
- Jack Lummus
- Kregg Lumpkin
- Ron Lumpkin
- Kayo Lunday
- Bob Lurtsema
- Dick Lynch
- Babe Lyon

== M ==
- Ken MacAfee
- Austin Mack
- Johnny Mackorell
- Bill Mackrides
- Tommy Maddox
- Sam Madison
- Bruce Maher
- Wesly Mallard
- Larry Mallory
- Ray Mallouf
- Pete Mangum
- Chris Manhertz
- Eli Manning
- Terrell Manning
- Mario Manningham
- Tillie Manton
- Lionel Manuel
- Stansly Maponga
- Andy Marefos
- Frank Marion
- Cliff Marker
- Dale Markham
- Sal Marone
- Duke Maronic
- Dick Marsh
- Arthur Marshall
- Brandon Marshall
- Ed Marshall
- Leonard Marshall
- Derrick Martin
- Frank Martin
- George Martin
- Kareem Martin
- Wes Martin
- Blake Martinez
- John Martinkovic
- Robert Massey
- John Mastrangelo
- Bill Matan
- Derrick Mathews
- Bo Matthews
- Michael Matthews
- Chris Maumalanga
- Josh Mauro
- Alvin Maxson
- Jim Maxwell
- Jalen Mayfield
- Brad Maynard
- Don Maynard
- David Mayo
- Mike Mayock
- Marcus Mbow
- Jude McAtamney
- Jack McBride
- Trumaine McBride
- Don McCafferty
- Ed McCaffrey
- Bobby McCain
- Jim McCann
- Tim McCann
- JJ McCarthy
- Bob McChesney
- Clint McClain
- Jameel McClain
- Nick McCloud
- Ray-Ray McCloud
- Phil McConkey
- Colt McCoy
- Mike McCoy
- Loaird McCreary
- Emmanuel McDaniel
- LeCharls McDaniel
- Shane McDermott
- Ramos McDonald
- Jerome McDougle
- John McDowell
- Hugh McElhenny
- Leon McFadden
- Micah McFadden
- Paul McFadden
- Brandon McGee
- Ed McGee
- Tony McGee
- Kanavis McGhee
- Ed McGinley
- Ed McGlasson
- Reggie McGowan
- Larry McGrew
- Curtis McGriff
- Lamar McGriggs
- R.J. McIntosh
- Kareem McKenzie
- Marcus McKethan
- Benardrick McKinney
- Odis McKinney
- Xavier McKinney
- Joe McLaughlin
- John McLaughry
- Danny McMullen
- Clifton McNeil
- R. W. McQuarters
- Leon McQuay
- Bennie McRae
- Jack Mead
- Dave Meggett
- Greg Meisner
- John Mellus
- Don Menasco
- John Mendenhall
- Pep Menefee
- Chuck Mercein
- Jamon Meredith
- Brandon Meriweather
- Casey Merrill
- Bus Mertes
- Max Messner
- Kevin Meuth
- Saul Mielziner
- Brian Mihalik
- Bill Miklich
- Ron Mikolajczyk
- Edmond Miles
- Joshua Miles
- Leo Miles
- Calvin Miller
- Corey Miller
- Dante Miller
- Eddie Miller
- Jim Miller
- Mike Miller
- Solomon Miller
- Bill Milner
- Century Milstead
- Skip Minisi
- Randy Minniear
- Bob Mischak
- John Mistler
- Brian Mitchell
- Buster Mitchell
- Hal Mitchell
- Kawika Mitchell
- Pete Mitchell
- Russell Mitchell
- Matt Mitrione
- Anthony Mix
- David Moa
- Dick Modzelewski
- Frank Molden
- Bo Molenda
- Henry Mondeaux
- Quincy Monk
- Joe Montgomery
- Pete Monty
- Damontre Moore
- Dana Moore
- Eric Moore (born 1965)
- Eric Moore (born 1981)
- Henry Moore
- Herman Moore
- Kamrin Moore
- Ken Moore
- Emery Moorehead
- Hap Moran
- Jim Moran
- Tom Moran
- Fabian Moreau
- Bill Morgan
- Dan Morgan
- Earl Morrall
- Alfred Morris
- Bob Morris
- Darryl Morris
- James Morris
- Joe Morris
- Joe Morrison
- Pat Morrison
- Bob Morrow
- Chad Morton
- Craig Morton
- Brandon Mosley
- Avery Moss
- Sinorice Moss
- Kelley Mote
- Zeke Mowatt
- Bob Mrosko
- Darius Muasau
- Tom Mullady
- Tom Mullen
- Lee Mulleneaux
- Noah Mullins
- George Munday
- Ryan Mundy
- Lyle Munn
- Calvin Munson
- Les Murdock
- Louis Murphy
- Ryan Murphy
- Earl Murray
- Mickey Murtagh
- Chris Myarick
- Brandon Myers
- Tommy Myers
- Toby Myles

== N ==
- Malik Nabers
- Bob Nash
- Ryan Nassib
- Evan Neal
- Bill Neill
- Jim Neill
- Andy Nelson
- Karl Nelson
- Al Nesser
- Doug Nettles
- Tom Neville
- Marshall Newhouse
- Harry Newman
- Frank Nicholson
- Hakeem Nicks
- Walt Nielsen
- Jerry Niles
- Björn Nittmo
- Emery Nix
- Louis Nix
- Dick Nolan
- John Norby
- Swede Nordstrom
- Jimmy Norris
- Jim Norton
- Tyler Nubin
- Rakeem Nunez-Roches

== O ==
- Bart Oates
- Roman Oben
- Jim Obradovich
- Dave O'Brien
- Owa Odighizuwa
- Steve Odom
- Chris Ogbonnaya
- Alec Ogletree
- Kevin Ogletree
- Shaun O'Hara
- Adewale Ojomo
- Azeez Ojulari
- Bobby Okereke
- Romeo Okwara
- Doug Oldershaw
- Ray Oldham
- Dan O'Leary
- Gunner Olszewski
- Ryan O'Malley
- Patrick Omameh
- Joe Orduna
- Raheem Orr
- Jim Ostendarp
- Tyler Ott
- Al Owen
- Bill Owen
- Steve Owen
- Gervarrius Owens
- R. C. Owens

== P ==
- Curtis Painter
- Lou Palazzi
- Lonnie Palelei
- Mike Palm
- Jesse Palmer
- Kaulana Park
- Frank Parker
- Glenn Parker
- Jeremiah Parker
- Kenny Parker
- Preston Parker
- Steven Parker
- Babe Parnell
- Ox Parry
- Bill Paschal
- Gordon Paschka
- Bear Pascoe
- Patrick Pass
- DeWayne Patmon
- David Patten
- Don Patterson
- Elvis Patterson
- Mike Patterson
- Jimmy Patton
- Robert Patton
- Spencer Paysinger
- Rico Payton
- Chris Peace
- Morgan Pears
- Matt Peart
- Francis Peay
- Win Pedersen
- Erric Pegram
- Ray Pelfrey
- Elijhaa Penny
- Jabrill Peppers
- Bolo Perdue
- Johnny Perkins
- Paul Perkins
- Ralph Perretta
- Leon Perry
- Dick Pesonen
- Christian Peter
- Scott Peters
- Will Peterson
- Luke Petitgout
- Bill Petrilas
- Mitch Petrus
- Gary Pettigrew
- Dante Pettis
- Bob Peviani
- Roman Phifer
- Andru Phillips
- Ewell Phillips
- Kenny Phillips
- Ryan Phillips
- Tyre Phillips
- Bill Piccolo
- Aaron Pierce
- Antonio Pierce
- Olsen Pierre
- Jason Pierre-Paul
- Jim Pietrzak
- Eric Pinkins
- Jason Pinnock
- Joyce Pipkin
- Joe Pisarcik
- Danny Pittman
- Tony Plansky
- Milt Plum
- Owen Pochman
- Willie Ponder
- Barney Poole
- Jim Poole
- Ray Poole
- Geoff Pope
- Rob Porter
- Bobby Post
- Earl Potteiger
- Ernest Pough
- Darius Powe
- Andre Powell
- Dick Powell
- Clyde Powers
- Jim Prestel
- Billy Price
- Eddie Price
- Dom Principe
- Bosh Pritchard
- Steve Pritko
- Joe Prokop
- Justin Pugh
- Marion Pugh
- Spencer Pulley
- Alfred Pupunu

== Q ==
- Jess Quatse

== R ==
- Phil Ragazzo
- Reggie Ragland
- Bobby Rainey
- Joe Ramona
- Rueben Randle
- Thomas Randolph
- John Rapacz
- Kenyon Rasheed
- Damion Ratley
- Corey Raymond
- Kalif Raymond
- Frank Reagan
- Gary Reasons
- Beasley Reece
- Henry Reed
- J. R. Reed
- Max Reed
- Smith Reed
- Hank Reese
- Moses Regular
- Steve Rehage
- Tom Rehder
- Milt Rehnquist
- Mike Remmers
- Darius Reynaud
- Dallas Reynolds
- Ed Reynolds
- Jerry Reynolds
- Owen Reynolds
- Ray Rhodes
- Bill Rice
- Herb Rich
- Kink Richards
- Weston Richburg
- Doug Riesenberg
- Curtis Riley
- Jordon Riley
- Lee Riley
- Keith Rivers
- Marcellus Rivers
- Nate Rivers
- Jack Rizzo
- Fred Robbins
- Gene Roberts
- Tom Roberts
- William Roberts
- Roy Robertson-Harris
- Aaron Robinson
- Adrien Robinson
- A'Shawn Robinson
- Jimmy Robinson
- Keenan Robinson
- Stacy Robinson
- Wan'Dale Robinson
- Andy Robustelli
- Quincy Roche
- Dominique Rodgers-Cromartie
- Ruben Rodriguez
- Jeff Roehl
- Casey Rogers
- Shaun Rogers
- Johnny Roland
- Antrel Rolle
- Dave Roller
- George Roman
- Bill Rooney
- Aldrick Rosas
- Rudy Rosatti
- Gene Rose
- Sage Rosenfels
- Mike Rosenthal
- Aaron Ross
- John Ross
- Kyle Rote
- Tom Rouen
- Aaron Rouse
- Lee Rouson
- Tony Rovinski
- Harmon Rowe
- Ed Royston
- Reggie Rucker
- Coleman Rudolph
- Kyle Rudolph
- Travis Rudolph
- Grey Ruegamer
- Jon Runyan Jr.
- Alonzo Russell
- Lafayette Russell
- Jeff Rutledge
- Logan Ryan

== S ==
- Kelly Saalfeld
- Jerome Sally
- Jack Salscheider
- John Sanchez
- Brandon Sanders
- Tony Sarausky
- Harvey Sark
- Tyler Sash
- Ollie Satenstein
- Ben Sauls
- Brian Saxton
- Dwight Scales
- Rich Scanlon
- Babe Scheuer
- Henry Schichtle
- Austin Schlottmann
- Bob Schmidt
- Bob Schmit
- John Michael Schmitz
- Bob Schnelker
- Otto Schnellbacher
- Bob Scholtz
- Adam Schreiber
- Eric Schubert
- Paul Schuette
- Bill Schuler
- Ray Schwab
- Geoff Schwartz
- Cedric Scott
- Da'Mari Scott
- Da'Rel Scott
- George Scott
- Joe Scott
- Lance Scott
- Malcolm Scott
- Tim Scott
- Tom Scott
- Stan Sczurek
- Jonas Seawright
- Len Sedbrook
- Jason Sehorn
- Red Seick
- Warren Seitz
- Andy Selfridge
- George Selvie
- Coty Sensabaugh
- Kato Serwanga
- Rich Seubert
- Leland Shaffer
- Hunter Sharp
- George Shaw
- Pete Shaw
- Ricky Shaw
- Jerry Shay
- Jabaal Sheard
- Ed Shedlosky
- Duke Shelley
- Danny Shelton
- Russell Shepard
- Sterling Shepard
- Kelvin Sheppard
- Mike Sherrard
- Bud Sherrod
- Tim Sherwin
- Visanthe Shiancoe
- Dick Shiner
- Billy Shipp
- Gary Shirk
- Jeremy Shockey
- Del Shofner
- Brandon Short
- Pete Shufelt
- Les Shy
- Jules Siegle
- Sam Silas
- David Sills
- Isaiah Simmons
- Roy Simmons
- Tony Simmons
- Bob Simms
- Phil Simms
- Dave Simonson
- Scott Simonson
- Al Simpson
- James Sims
- Walt Singer
- Bill Singletary
- Devin Singletary
- Clint Sintim
- Brian Sisley
- Jim Sivell
- Cam Skattebo
- Deontae Skinner
- Tuzar Skipper
- Leo Skladany
- John Skorupan
- Matt Skura
- Lou Slaby
- Chad Slade
- Darius Slayton
- Eldridge Small
- George Small
- Doug Smith
- Elerson Smith
- Eric Smith
- Geno Smith
- Jaylon Smith
- Jeff Smith (born 1943)
- Jeff Smith (born 1962)
- Joey Smith
- Kaden Smith
- Lance Smith
- Omar Smith
- Red Smith
- Shane Smith
- Steve Smith
- Torin Smith
- Tyson Smith
- Wee Willie Smith
- Zeke Smith
- Ihmir Smith-Marsette
- Norm Snead
- Chris Snee
- Adam Snyder
- Snitz Snyder
- Hank Soar
- Ben Sohn
- Nate Solder
- Phillippi Sparks
- Willie Spencer
- Jack Spinks
- Hal Springer
- Charles Stackhouse
- Harrison Stafford
- Dick Stahlman
- Randy Staten
- Sammy Stein
- Al Steinfeld
- Paul Stenn
- Reggie Stephens
- Art Stevenson
- Jonathan Stewart
- Jim Stienke
- Aaron Stinnie
- Bill Stits
- Tim Stokes
- Brandon Stokley
- Bryan Stoltenberg
- Ron Stone
- Omar Stoutmire
- John Strada
- Michael Strahan
- Bill Stribling
- Greg Stroman
- Ken Strong
- Jack Stroud
- Henry Stuckey
- Nate Stupar
- Andy Stynchula
- Joe Sulaitis
- Pat Summerall
- Carl Summerell
- Ty Summers
- Don Sutherin
- Ed Sutton
- Frank Sutton
- Harland Svare
- Bill Svoboda
- Bill Swain
- Gregg Swartwoudt
- Bill Swiacki
- Joe Szczecko

== T ==
- Phil Tabor
- Joe Taffoni
- Joe Taibi
- Ben Talley
- Julian Talley
- Alex Tanney
- Fran Tarkenton
- Bob Tarrant
- David Tate
- Golden Tate
- John Tate
- Josiah Tauaefa
- John Tautolo
- Billy Taylor
- Bob Taylor
- Cooper Taylor
- Devin Taylor
- Jamaar Taylor
- Lawrence Taylor
- Tyrod Taylor
- Kayvon Thibodeaux
- Aaron Thomas
- Andrew Thomas
- Bob Thomas
- Dave Thomas
- Devin Thomas
- George Thomas
- J. T. Thomas
- Jaylon Thomas
- Mark Thomas
- Michael Thomas
- Robert Thomas
- Terrell Thomas
- Tre Thomas
- Darian Thompson
- James Thompson
- Mykkele Thompson
- Reyna Thompson
- Rocky Thompson
- Trenton Thompson
- Warren Thompson
- George Thornton
- Jim Thorpe
- Steve Thurlow
- Walter Thurmond
- Travis Tidwell
- Leo Tierney
- Lewis Tillman
- Bob Timberlake
- Dave Tipton
- Y. A. Tittle
- George Tobin
- Steve Tobin
- Levine Toilolo
- Dave Tollefson
- Army Tomaini
- Carl Tomasello
- Tommy Tomlin
- Dalvin Tomlinson
- Eric Tomlinson
- Kadarius Toney
- Amani Toomer
- Jeff Tootle
- Bob Topp
- Ryan Torain
- Reggie Torbor
- Bob Torrey
- Adrian Tracy
- Tyrone Tracy Jr.
- Justin Trattou
- John Treadaway
- David Treadwell
- Bill Triplett
- Mel Triplett
- Bob Trocolor
- Justin Tryon
- Justin Tuck
- Bob Tucker
- John Tuggle
- Emlen Tunnell
- J. T. Turner
- Kevin Turner
- Odessa Turner
- Orville Tuttle
- Will Tye
- Maurice Tyler
- Lawrence Tynes
- David Tyree

== U ==
- Tony Ugoh
- Osi Umenyiora
- Frank Umont
- Rich Umphrey
- Olen Underwood
- Uani 'Unga
- Regan Upshaw
- Scott Urch

== V ==
- Doug Van Horn
- Nick Vannett
- Vernon Vanoy
- Brad Van Pelt
- Greg Van Roten
- Larry Vargo
- Shane Vereen
- Olivier Vernon
- Larry Visnic
- Otto Vokaty
- Rick Volk
- Don Vosberg
- Tillie Voss

== W ==
- Trevin Wade
- Carl Wafer
- Larry Walbridge
- Craig Walendy
- Frank Walker
- Greg Walker
- Herschel Walker
- Mickey Walker
- Paul Walker
- Robert Walker
- Roger Wallace
- Darren Waller
- Everson Walls
- Will Walls
- Austin Walter
- J. D. Walton
- Joe Walton
- Wayne Walton
- Whip Walton
- Derrick Ward
- Jihad Ward
- DJ Ware
- Kurt Warner
- Vince Warren
- Corey Washington
- Damon Washington
- Gene Washington
- John Washington
- Keith Washington
- Larry Watkins
- Tim Watson
- Armon Watts
- Ted Watts
- Charles Way
- Steve Weatherford
- Andre Weathers
- Larrye Weaver
- Allan Webb
- B. W. Webb
- Davis Webb
- Joe Webb
- Dutch Webber
- Alex Webster
- Corey Webster
- Arnie Weinmeister
- Ed Weisacosky
- John Weiss
- Herb Welch
- Joe Wellborn
- Joel Wells
- Kent Wells
- Bull Wesley
- Lyle West
- Stan West
- Jeff Weston
- Tyrone Wheatley
- Chad Wheeler
- Ernie Wheelwright
- Guy Whimper
- Adrian White
- Clayton White
- Freeman White
- Jim White
- Marsh White
- Myles White
- Phil White
- Robb White
- Sheldon White
- Tarzan White
- Bob Whitfield
- Benton Whitley
- Nikita Whitlock
- David Whitmore
- Mike Whittington
- Jason Whittle
- Ossie Wiberg
- Corey Widmer
- Ed Widseth
- Ray Wietecha
- Chuck Wiley
- Dick Wilkins
- Bob Wilkinson
- Gerris Wilkinson
- Andre Williams
- Antonio Williams
- Brandon Williams
- Brian Williams (born 1966)
- Brian Williams (born 1979)
- Byron Williams
- Davern Williams
- Dee Williams
- Ellery Williams
- Frank Williams
- George Williams
- Jacquian Williams
- Jarren Williams
- Jarvis Williams
- Joe Williams
- Jordan Williams
- Leonard Williams
- Nick Williams
- Perry Williams
- Rodarius Williams
- Rodney Williams
- Shaun Williams
- Van Williams
- Willie Williams
- Ernie Williamson
- Ken Willis
- Butch Wilson
- David Wilson
- Divaad Wilson
- Gibril Wilson
- Mule Wilson
- Russell Wilson
- Bill Windauer
- Brandon Winey
- Brad Wing
- Jameis Winston
- Bill Winter
- Frank Winters
- Brian Witherspoon
- Hugh Wolfe
- Gary Wood
- Dick Woodard
- Butch Woolfolk
- Gary Woolford
- Tito Wooten
- Roscoe Word
- Hoge Workman
- Joe Wostoupal
- Anthony Wright
- Manuel Wright
- Steve Wright
- Kervin Wyatt
- Doug Wycoff
- Kerry Wynn
- Renaldo Wynn
- Harry Wynne

== X ==
- Oshane Ximines

== Y ==
- Jim Yarbrough
- Howie Yeager
- Dick Yelvington
- Isaac Yiadom
- Len Younce
- Dave Young
- Rodney Young
- Willie Young
- Frank Youso
- Walt Yowarsky

== Z ==
- Joe Zapustas
- Rob Zatechka
- Dusty Zeigler
- Kevin Zeitler
- Coleman Zeno
- Chris Ziemann
- Mickey Zofko
- Jim Zyntell
