= 1976 New York Giants season =

NFL team season

- Head coach: Bill Arnsparger (fired, 0–7); John McVay (interim, 3–4)
- Home stadium: Giants Stadium

Results
- Record: 3–11
- Division place: 5th NFC East
- Playoffs: Did not qualify
- Pro Bowlers: LB Brad Van Pelt

The 1976 New York Giants season was the franchise's 52nd season in the National Football League. The Giants had a 3–11 record in 1976 and finished last in the five-team NFC East.

The season was highlighted by the opening of the new Giants Stadium at the New Jersey Meadowlands in East Rutherford on October 10. In the first game at the stadium, after four road games to open the season, the defending NFC champion Dallas Cowboys handed New York a 24–14 loss. The Giants then suffered defeats against the Minnesota Vikings and Pittsburgh Steelers, falling to 0–7. At this time, they fired third-year head coach Bill Arnsparger, whose Giants teams had lost 28 times in 35 games. John McVay was named the team's interim coach, although director of operations Andy Robustelli said the appointment was "not strictly" on a temporary basis.

New York lost its first two games under McVay, against the Philadelphia Eagles and Cowboys. The Giants' first win at Giants Stadium came on November 14, when they defeated the Washington Redskins 12–9; it was their first victory of the season after nine consecutive losses and the first over a George Allen-coached team in 15 tries. In their final four games, they won twice. Linebacker Brad Van Pelt became the first Giant to receive a Pro Bowl invitation since 1972. Following the season, McVay was retained as head coach, signing a two-year contract.

For the 1976 season and now based in New Jersey, the Giants debuted their new helmet design, changing from a stylized “NY” to the word “GIANTS”, underlined in block letters. They wore these exact helmets through the 1979 season; in 1980, the helmet's white stripes were eliminated. These helmets remained unchanged through 1999.

== Offseason ==
=== 1976 expansion draft ===
New York Giants selected during the expansion draft
Round	Overall	Name	Position	Expansion team
0	0	Don Clune	Wide receiver	Seattle Seahawks
0	0	Rondy Colbert	Cornerback	Seattle Seahawks
0	0	Jimmy Gunn	Linebacker	Tampa Bay Buccaneers

=== NFL draft ===
1976 New York Giants draft
Round	Pick	Player	Position	College	Notes
1	13	Troy Archer	Defensive tackle	Colorado	
4	104	Gordon Bell	Running back	Michigan	
4	105	Harry Carson * ^{†}	Linebacker	South Carolina State	
5	136	Melvin Wilson	Defensive back	Cal State Northridge	
6	162	Dan Lloyd	Linebacker	Washington	
8	221	John Jordan	Defensive tackle	Indiana	
10	276	John Thomas	Running back	Valley City State	
11	303	Craig Brantley	Wide receiver	Clemson	
12	333	Jerry Golsteyn	Quarterback	Northern Illinois	
13	360	Rick Caswell	Wide receiver	Western Kentucky	
14	387	Jerry Mullane	Linebacker	Lehigh	
15	417	Eddie Morgan	Defensive tackle	Arkansas State	
16	444	Dave Lawson	Kicker	Air Force	
17	471	Steve Curnutte	Defensive back	Vanderbilt	
Made roster † Pro Football Hall of Fame * Made at least one Pro Bowl during career

== Personnel ==
=== Staff ===
1976 New York Giants staff
Front office: Co-Owner – Tim Mara; Co-Owner / President – Wellington Mara; General manager / Director of Operations – Andy Robustelli; Director of Player Personnel – Jim Lee Howell; Director of Pro Personnel – Jim Trimble; Scouts – Roosevelt Brown, Ken Kavanaugh, Ed Rutledge; Head coaches: Head coach – Bill Arnsparger (games 1-7, fired); Interim Head coach – John McVay (games 8-14); Offensive coaches: Offensive Backs / Running Backs – Allan Webb; Wide Receivers – Hunter Enis, Ted Plumb; Offensive Line – Ray Wietecha	Defensive coaches: Defensive Line – Jay Fry; Linebackers – Marty Schottenheimer; Defensive Backfield – Jim Symank; Defensive Assistant – John McVay; Special teams coaches: Special Teams / Kickers – Ed Rutledge

=== Roster ===
1976 New York Giants roster
Quarterbacks (QB): 15 Craig Morton; 9 Dennis Shaw; 16 Norm Snead; Running backs (RB): 25 Gordon Bell; 33 Bobby Hammond; 44 Doug Kotar; 36 Larry Watkins; 25 Marsh White; Wide receivers (WR): 84 Walker Gillette; 89 Ed Marshall; 82 Ray Rhodes; 85 Jimmy Robinson; 88 Roger Wallace; Tight ends (TE): 87 Gary Shirk; 38 Bob Tucker	Offensive linemen (OL): 61 Karl Chandler C; 65 Bill Ellenbogen G; 76 Mike Gibbons T; 74 John Hicks G; 52 Ralph Hill C; 78 Dick Leavitt T; 62 Ron Mikolajczyk G; 79 Al Simpson G; 63 Doug Van Horn T; Defensive linemen (DL): 77 Troy Archer DT; 66 Rick Dvorak DE; 71 Dave Gallagher DT; 75 George Martin DE; 64 John Mendenhall DT	Linebackers (LB): 53 Harry Carson MLB; 57 Brad Cousino MLB; 56 Pat Hughes OLB; 55 Brian Kelley OLB; 54 Dan Lloyd OLB; 10 Brad Van Pelt OLB; Defensive backs (DB): 21 Bill Bryant CB; 26 Rondy Colbert CB; 34 Larry Mallory SS; 29 Clyde Powers SS; 20 Jim Stienke CB/FS; 23 Rick Volk FS; Special teams (ST): 18 Joe Danelo K; 13 Dave Jennings P	Reserve: -- Tim Berra WR (IR); 22 Bobby Brooks CB (IR); 39 Larry Csonka RB (IR); 27 Charlie Ford CB (IR); 28 Robert Giblin S (IR); 12 Jerry Golsteyn QB (IR); 81 Jack Gregory DE (IR); -- John Jordan DT (IR); -- David Lawson K (Military); 73 Tom Mullen T (IR); -- Jim Pietrzak DT (IR); 59 Bob Schmit LB (IR); 48 Henry Stuckey CB (IR); Rookies in italics

== Schedule ==
Week	Date	Opponent	Result	Record	Attendance
1	September 12	at **Washington Redskins**	**L** 17–19	0–1	54,245
2	September 19	at **Philadelphia Eagles**	**L** 7–20	0–2	66,005
3	September 26	at Los Angeles Rams	**L** 10–24	0–3	60,698
4	October 3	at **St. Louis Cardinals**	**L** 21–27	0–4	48,039
5	October 10	**Dallas Cowboys**	**L** 14–24	0–5	76,042
6	October 17	at Minnesota Vikings	**L** 7–24	0–6	46,508
7	October 24	Pittsburgh Steelers	**L** 0–27	0–7	69,783
8	October 31	**Philadelphia Eagles**	**L** 0–10	0–8	68,690
9	November 7	at **Dallas Cowboys**	**L** 3–9	0–9	58,870
10	November 14	**Washington Redskins**	**W** 12–9	1–9	72,975
11	November 21	at Denver Broncos	**L** 13–14	1–10	63,151
12	November 28	Seattle Seahawks	**W** 28–16	2–10	65,111
13	December 5	Detroit Lions	**W** 24–10	3–10	66,069
14	December 12	**St. Louis Cardinals**	**L** 14–17	3–11	60,553

Note: Intra-division opponents are in bold text.

== Standings ==
NFC East
	W	L	T	PCT	DIV	CONF	PF	PA	STK
^{(2)} Dallas Cowboys	11	3	0	.786	6–2	9–3	296	194	L1
^{(4)} Washington Redskins	10	4	0	.714	6–2	9–3	291	217	W4
St. Louis Cardinals	10	4	0	.714	5–3	9–3	309	267	W2
Philadelphia Eagles	4	10	0	.286	2–6	4–8	165	286	W1
New York Giants	3	11	0	.214	1–7	3–9	170	250	L1

NFC Central
	W	L	T	PCT	DIV	CONF	PF	PA	STK
^{(1)} Minnesota Vikings	11	2	1	.821	5–1	9–2–1	305	176	W2
Chicago Bears	7	7	0	.500	4–2	7–5	253	216	L1
Detroit Lions	6	8	0	.429	2–4	4–8	262	220	L2
Green Bay Packers	5	9	0	.357	1–5	5–8	218	299	W1

NFC West
	W	L	T	PCT	DIV	CONF	PF	PA	STK
^{(3)} Los Angeles Rams	10	3	1	.750	7–0	9–2–1	351	190	W4
San Francisco 49ers	8	6	0	.571	5–2	7–5	270	190	W1
New Orleans Saints	4	10	0	.286	2–5	3–8	253	346	L3
Atlanta Falcons	4	10	0	.286	2–5	4–8	172	312	L3
Seattle Seahawks	2	12	0	.143	1–3	1–12	229	429	L5

== Bibliography ==
- Harris, David (2008). The Genius: How Bill Walsh Reinvented Football and Created an NFL Dynasty. New York City: Random House. ISBN 978-1-58836-810-2.
- Whittingham, Richard (2005). Illustrated History of the New York Giants. Chicago: Triumph Books. ISBN 1-57243-641-7.
