= 1974 New York Giants season =

NFL team season

- Owner: Timothy J. Mara, Wellington Mara
- Head coach: Bill Arnsparger
- Home stadium: Yale Bowl

Results
- Record: 2–12
- Division place: 5th NFC East
- Playoffs: Did not qualify
- Pro Bowlers: None

The 1974 New York Giants season was the franchise's 50th season in the National Football League. The Giants finished in last place in the National Football Conference East Division with a 2–12 record, the team's worst since 1966.

The Giants’ home venue in 1974 was the Yale Bowl in New Haven, Connecticut, and they were winless at home in seven games. They won only one of twelve games at the Yale Bowl in 1973 and 1974. The Giants played at Shea Stadium in Queens in 1975 and opened Giants Stadium in New Jersey in October 1976.

The 1974 Giants hold the distinction of being the first team to lose a regular season game in overtime. In week nine, the 2–6 Giants welcomed the cross-town rival Jets to the Yale Bowl. With the Giants leading 20–13 in the fourth quarter, Joe Namath faked a handoff to Emerson Boozer, then ran into the end zone for a touchdown which tied the score at 20–20, forcing overtime; previously, a game between the Pittsburgh Steelers and Denver Broncos had ended in a 35–35 tie. The Giants were denied a game-winning score when Pete Gogolak missed a 42-yard field goal attempt, despite protests from Gogolak that he had made the kick. The Jets subsequently won 26–20 on a five-yard pass from Namath to Boozer after 6:53 of play in the extra period.

== Offseason ==
=== Draft ===
1974 New York Giants draft
Round	Pick	Player	Position	College	Notes
1	3	John Hicks	Guard	Ohio State	
2	28	Tom Mullen	Guard	Southwest Missouri State	
3	55	Rick Dvorak	Defensive tackle	Wichita State	
4	80	Carl Summerell	Quarterback	East Carolina	
5	107	Don Clune	Wide receiver	Penn	
5	119	Clyde Powers	Defensive back	Oklahoma	
6	132	Jim Pietrzak	Center	Eastern Michigan	
7	159	Marty Woolbright	Tight end	South Carolina	
8	184	Ezil Bibbs	Defensive end	Grambling State	
9	211	Jim Rathje	Running back	Northern Michigan	
10	236	Ray Rhodes	Defensive back	Tulsa	
11	263	Bobby Brooks	Defensive back	Bishop	
12	288	Jimmy Sims	Linebacker	USC	
13	315	Dennis Colvin	Tackle	Southwest Texas State	
14	340	Mike Hayes	Tackle	Virginia State	
15	367	Larry Jones	Wingback	Northeast Missouri State	
16	392	Buddy Brown	Guard	Alabama	Signed with Birmingham Americans (WFL)
17	419	Steve Crosby	Running back	Fort Hays State	
Made roster

== Personnel ==
=== Staff ===
1974 New York Giants staff
Front office: Co-Owner - Tim Mara; Co-Owner / President – Wellington Mara; General manager / Director of Operations – Andy Robustelli; Director of Player Personnel - Jim Lee Howell; Director of Pro Personnel – Jim Trimble; Scouts - Roosevelt Brown, Ken Kavanaugh; Head coaches: Head coach – Bill Arnsparger; Offensive coaches: Offensive Backfield – Ted Plumb; Running Backs - Allan Webb; Wide Receivers - Hunter Enis; Offensive Line – Ray Wietecha	Defensive coaches: Defensive Coordinator – Maxie Baughan; Defensive Line – Floyd Peters; Defensive Backs - Emlen Tunnell; Linebackers – Marty Schottenheimer; Defensive Backfield – Jim Symank; Strength and conditioning: None - N/A

=== Roster ===
1974 New York Giants roster
Quarterbacks (QB): 12 Jim Del Gaizo; 15 Craig Morton; 19 Carl Summerell; Running backs (RB): 26 Joe Dawkins; 30 Ron Johnson; 44 Doug Kotar; 25 Leon McQuay; 34 Mickey Zofko; Wide receivers (WR): 88 Don Clune; 84 Walker Gillette; 27 Bob Grim; 82 Ray Rhodes; Tight ends (TE): 83 Chip Glass; 38 Bob Tucker	Offensive linemen (OL): 61 Karl Chandler C; 62 Dick Enderle G; 74 John Hicks G; 52 John Hill T; 70 Bob Hyland C; 73 Tom Mullen G; 63 Doug Van Horn T; 69 Willie Young T; Defensive linemen (DL): 66 Rick Dvorak DE; 81 Jack Gregory DE; 78 Roy Hilton DE; 75 Larry Jacobson DT; 64 John Mendenhall DT; 76 Jim Pietrzak DT; 80 Henry Reed DT/DE; 72 Carl Wafer DE	Linebackers (LB): 67 Ron Hornsby MLB; 56 Pat Hughes OLB; 55 Brian Kelley MLB; 57 Andy Selfridge OLB; 54 Bill Singletary OLB; 10 Brad Van Pelt OLB; Defensive backs (DB): 45 Pete Athas CB; 37 Bobby Brooks CB; 24 Chuck Crist SS; 29 Honor Jackson CB/S; 43 Spider Lockhart FS; 39 Clyde Powers SS; 18 Eldridge Small CB; 20 Jim Stienke CB; Special teams (ST): 3 Pete Gogolak K; 13 Dave Jennings P	Reserve: 33 Steve Crosby RB (IR); 72 George Hasenohrl DT (IR); 85 Don Herrmann WR (IR); 91 Gary Pettigrew DT (IR); Rookies in italics

== Schedule ==
Week	Date	Opponent	Result	Record	Venue	Attendance	Recap
1	September 15	**Washington Redskins**	**L** 10–13	0–1	Yale Bowl	49,849	Recap
2	September 22	New England Patriots	**L** 20–28	0–2	Yale Bowl	44,082	Recap
3	September 29	at **Dallas Cowboys**	**W** 14–6	1–2	Texas Stadium	45,841	Recap
4	October 6	Atlanta Falcons	**L** 7–14	1–3	Yale Bowl	42,379	Recap
5	October 13	at **Philadelphia Eagles**	**L** 7–35	1–4	Veterans Stadium	64,801	Recap
6	October 20	at **Washington Redskins**	**L** 3–24	1–5	RFK Stadium	53,879	Recap
7	October 27	**Dallas Cowboys**	**L** 7–21	1–6	Yale Bowl	57,381	Recap
8	November 3	at Kansas City Chiefs	**W** 33–27	2–6	Arrowhead Stadium	61,437	Recap
9	November 10	New York Jets	**L** 20–26 (OT)	2–7	Yale Bowl	64,327	Recap
10	November 17	at Detroit Lions	**L** 19–20	2–8	Tiger Stadium	40,431	Recap
11	November 24	**St. Louis Cardinals**	**L** 21–23	2–9	Yale Bowl	40,615	Recap
12	December 1	at Chicago Bears	**L** 13–16	2–10	Soldier Field	18,802	Recap
13	December 8	**Philadelphia Eagles**	**L** 7–20	2–11	Yale Bowl	21,170	Recap
14	December 15	at **St. Louis Cardinals**	**L** 14–26	2–12	Busch Memorial Stadium	47,414	Recap

- Intra-division opponents are in **bold** text.

== Game summaries ==
=== Week 3 at Cowboys ===
New York Giants (1–1) at Dallas Cowboys (1–1)

Quarter	1	2	3	4	Total
Giants	0	14	0	0	14
Cowboys	0	0	0	6	6

at Texas Stadium • Irving, Texas

- Date: September 29
- Game time: 2:00 p.m.
- Game weather: 64 °F (18 °C) • Wind 7 miles per hour (11 km/h; 6.1 kn)
- Game attendance: 45,841
- TV announcers (CBS): Jack Buck, Pat Summerall
- Box Score

Game information

Giants

- Norm Snead
  11/17, 128 Yds, TD
- Joe Dawkins
  9 Rush, 51 Yds
- Bob Grim
  1 Rec, 50 Yds

Cowboys

- Roger Staubach
  20/37, 256 Yds, TD, 3 INT
- Robert Newhouse
  12 Rush, 47 Yds
- Drew Pearson
  6 Rec, 116 Yds

Scoring summary

Quarter	Time	Drive			Team	Scoring information	Score	
Quarter	Time	Plays	Yards	TOP	Team	Scoring information	NYG	DAL
2					Giants	Doug Kotar 2-yard touchdown run, Pete Gogolak kick good	7	0
4					Giants	Joe Dawkins 14-yard touchdown reception from Norm Snead, Pete Gogolak kick good	14	0
4					Cowboys	Bob Hayes 35-yard touchdown reception from Roger Staubach, Mac Percival kick no good	14	6
"TOP" = time of possession. For other American football terms, see Glossary of American football.							14	6

=== Week 9 vs Jets ===
Week Nine: New York Jets (1–7) at New York Giants (2–6)

Quarter	1	2	3	4	OT	Total
Jets	7	3	3	7	6	26
Giants	3	10	7	0	0	20

at Yale Bowl, New Haven, Connecticut

- Date: November 10, 1974
- Game time: 1:00 p.m. EST
- Game weather: 50 °F (10 °C)
- Game attendance: 64,327
- TV announcers (NBC): Charlie Jones, Sam DeLuca
- Box Score

Game information

First quarter

- NYJ – David Knight 19-yard pass from Joe Namath (Pat Leahy kick). Jets 7–0. Drive:
- NYG – Pete Gogolak 26-yard field goal. Jets 7–3. Drive:

Second quarter

- NYG – Bob Tucker 2-yard pass from Craig Morton (Pete Gogolak kick). Giants 10–7. Drive:
- NYJ – Pat Leahy 34-yard field goal. Tie 10–10. Drive:
- NYG – Pete Gogolak 22-yard field goal. Giants 13–10. Drive:

Third quarter

- NYJ – Pat Leahy 22-yard field goal. Tie 13–13. Drive:
- NYG – Bob Grim 12-yard pass from Craig Morton (Pete Gogolak kick). Giants 20–13. Drive:

Fourth quarter

- NYJ – Joe Namath 3-yard run (Pat Leahy kick). Tie 20–20. Drive:

Overtime

- NYJ – Emerson Boozer 5-yard pass from Joe Namath. Jets 26–20. Drive:

Top passers

- NYJ – Joe Namath – 20/31, 236 yards, 2 TD
- NYG – Craig Morton – 21/32, 237 yards, 2 TD

Top rushers

- NYJ – Robert Burns – 21 rushes, 101 yards
- NYG – Joe Dawkins – 11 rushes, 49 yards

Top receivers

- NYJ – Rich Caster – 3 receptions, 68 yards
- NYG – Walker Gillette – 5 receptions, 83 yards

=== Week 11 vs Cardinals ===
St. Louis Cardinals (8–2) at New York Giants (2–8)

Quarter	1	2	3	4	Total
Cardinals	6	0	7	10	23
Giants	0	7	7	7	21

at Yale Bowl • New Haven, Connecticut

- Date: November 24
- Game time: 1:00 p.m.
- Game weather: 45 °F (7 °C) • Wind 9 miles per hour (14 km/h; 7.8 kn)
- Game attendance: 40,615
- TV announcers (CBS): Pat Summerall, Tom Brookshier, Johnny Unitas
- Box Score

Game information

Cardinals

- Jim Hart
  25/42, 259 Yds, 2 TD
- Terry Metcalf
  15 Rush, 48 Yds
- Mel Gray
  5 Rec, 102 Yds, TD

Giants

- Craig Morton
  21/35, 257 Yds, 2 TD, INT
- Joe Dawkins
  12 Rush, 65 Yds
- Bob Tucker
  5 Rec, 69 Yds, TD

Scoring summary

Quarter	Time	Drive			Team	Scoring information	Score	
Quarter	Time	Plays	Yards	TOP	Team	Scoring information	STL	NYG
1					Cardinals	36-yard field goal by Jim Bakken	3	0
2					Cardinals	32-yard field goal by Jim Bakken	6	0
2					Giants	Ron Johnson 2-yard touchdown run, Pete Gogolak kick good	6	7
3					Giants	Bob Tucker 29-yard touchdown reception from Craig Morton, Pete Gogolak kick good	6	14
3					Cardinals	Earl Thomas 16-yard touchdown reception from Jim Hart, Jim Bakken kick good	13	14
4					Cardinals	Mel Gray 45-yard touchdown reception from Jim Hart, Jim Bakken kick good	20	14
4					Giants	Walker Gillette 17-yard touchdown reception from Craig Morton, Pete Gogolak kick good	20	21
4					Cardinals	36-yard field goal by Jim Bakken	23	21
"TOP" = time of possession. For other American football terms, see Glossary of American football.							23	21

== Standings ==
NFC East
	W	L	T	PCT	DIV	CONF	PF	PA	STK
St. Louis Cardinals	10	4	0	.714	7–1	8–3	285	218	W1
Washington Redskins	10	4	0	.714	5–3	8–3	320	196	W2
Dallas Cowboys	8	6	0	.571	4–4	6–5	297	235	L1
Philadelphia Eagles	7	7	0	.500	3–5	5–6	242	217	W3
New York Giants	2	12	0	.143	1–7	1–10	195	299	L6

NFC Central
	W	L	T	PCT	DIV	CONF	PF	PA	STK
Minnesota Vikings	10	4	0	.714	4–2	8–3	310	195	W3
Detroit Lions	7	7	0	.500	3–3	6–5	256	270	L1
Green Bay Packers	6	8	0	.429	3–3	4–7	210	206	L3
Chicago Bears	4	10	0	.286	2–4	4–7	152	279	L2

NFC West
	W	L	T	PCT	DIV	CONF	PF	PA	STK
Los Angeles Rams	10	4	0	.714	5–1	7–3	263	181	W1
San Francisco 49ers	6	8	0	.429	4–2	6–5	226	236	W2
New Orleans Saints	5	9	0	.357	3–3	5–6	166	263	L1
Atlanta Falcons	3	11	0	.214	0–6	3–8	111	271	W1

== See also ==
- 1974 NFL season
