= 1972 New York Giants season =

NFL team season

- Head coach: Alex Webster
- Home stadium: Yankee Stadium

Results
- Record: 8–6
- Division place: 3rd NFC East
- Playoffs: Did not qualify
- Pro Bowlers: QB Norm Snead; RB Ron Johnson; DE Jack Gregory

The 1972 New York Giants season was the franchise's 48th season in the National Football League (NFL). The Giants had an 8–6 record and finished in third place in the National Football Conference East Division, three games behind the Washington Redskins.

The Giants had two first-round selections in the 1972 NFL draft, and chose Eldridge Small and Larry Jacobson with the 17th and 24th overall picks, respectively. Before the season, New York traded their starting quarterback, Fran Tarkenton, to the Minnesota Vikings for a package of players and draft picks that included quarterback Norm Snead, who led the league in pass completion average in 1972. The Giants lost twice to open the season, but went on a four-game winning streak afterwards. In their 11th game, the Giants defeated the Philadelphia Eagles 62–10, setting the franchise record for the most points scored in a game; it was also an Eagles record for the most points allowed. The victory put the team at 7–4 and in contention for a playoff berth. Two losses ended their postseason chances, but New York beat the Dallas Cowboys in the final game of the season to finish with eight wins. Halfback Ron Johnson scored nine touchdowns on running plays to top the NFL, and his 1,182 rushing yards broke the Giants' single-season record. This was the last winning season for the Giants until 1981.

== Roster ==
1972 New York Giants roster
Quarterbacks (QB): 11 Randy Johnson; 16 Norm Snead; Running backs (RB): 29 Vince Clements; 30 Ron Johnson; 40 Joe Morrison; 49 Joe Orduna; 22 Rocky Thompson; Wide receivers (WR): 27 Bob Grim; 85 Don Herrmann; 84 Rich Houston; Tight ends (TE): 87 Rich Kotite; 38 Bob Tucker	Offensive linemen (OL): 65 Mark Ellison G; 62 Dick Enderle G; 52 John Hill C; 70 Bob Hyland G/C; 53 Greg Larson C; 63 Doug Van Horn G; 72 Joe Taffoni T; 69 Willie Young T; Defensive linemen (DL): 68 Dan Goich DT; 81 Jack Gregory DE; 75 Larry Jacobson DT; 64 John Mendenhall DT; 80 Henry Reed DE; 71 Dave Tipton DE	Linebackers (LB): 79 Carter Campbell OLB; 51 John Douglas OLB; 58 Jim Files OLB; 67 Ron Hornsby MLB; 56 Pat Hughes MLB; Defensive backs (DB): 45 Pete Athas CB; 21 Otto Brown FS; 24 Chuck Crist SS; 44 Richmond Flowers SS; 43 Spider Lockhart FS; 18 Eldridge Small CB; 41 Willie Williams CB; Special teams (ST): 15 Tom Blanchard P; 3 Pete Gogolak K	Practice squad: 20 Scott Eaton S; 83 Thom Gatewood WR; 61 Charlie Harper DT; 73 Jim Kanicki DT; 34 Eddie Richardson RB; 78 Wayne Walton G/T; Reserve: -- Bart Buetow T (IR); 31 Charlie Evans RB (IR); -- Roland Lakes DT Retired; Rookies in italics

== Schedule ==
Week	Date	Opponent	Result	Record	Attendance
1	September 17	at Detroit Lions	**L** 16–30	0–1	54,418
2	September 24	**Dallas Cowboys**	**L** 14–23	0–2	62,725
3	October 2	at **Philadelphia Eagles**	**W** 27–12	1–2	65,720
4	October 8	New Orleans Saints	**W** 45–21	2–2	62,507
5	October 15	at San Francisco 49ers	**W** 23–17	3–2	58,606
6	October 22	**St. Louis Cardinals**	**W** 27–21	4–2	62,756
7	October 29	**Washington Redskins**	**L** 16–23	4–3	62,878
8	November 5	Denver Broncos	**W** 29–17	5–3	62,689
9	November 12	at **Washington Redskins**	**L** 13–27	5–4	53,039
10	November 19	at **St. Louis Cardinals**	**W** 13–7	6–4	48,014
11	November 26	**Philadelphia Eagles**	**W** 62–10	7–4	62,586
12	December 3	at Cincinnati Bengals	**L** 10–13	7–5	59,523
13	December 10	Miami Dolphins	**L** 13–23	7–6	62,728
14	December 17	at **Dallas Cowboys**	**W** 23–3	8–6	64,602

Note: Intra-division opponents are in bold text.

=== Standings ===
NFC East
	W	L	T	PCT	DIV	CONF	PF	PA	STK
Washington Redskins	11	3	0	.786	7–1	10–1	336	218	L2
Dallas Cowboys	10	4	0	.714	6–2	7–4	319	240	L1
New York Giants	8	6	0	.571	5–3	7–4	331	247	W1
St. Louis Cardinals	4	9	1	.321	1–6–1	3–7–1	193	303	W2
Philadelphia Eagles	2	11	1	.179	0–7–1	0–10–1	145	352	L5
