= John McVay =

American football coach and executive (1931–2022)

Biographical details
- Born: January 5, 1931; Bellaire, Ohio, U.S.
- Died: October 31, 2022 (aged 91); Granite Bay, California, U.S.

Playing career
- 1950–1952: Miami (OH)
- Position: Center

Coaching career (HC unless noted)
- 1953–1955: Lancaster HS (OH) (assistant)
- 1956: Franklin HS (OH)
- 1957–1961: Central Catholic HS (OH)
- 1962–1964: Michigan State (assistant)
- 1965–1972: Dayton
- 1974–1975: Memphis Southmen
- 1976: New York Giants (assistant)
- 1976–1978: New York Giants

Administrative career (AD unless noted)
- 1972–1973: Dayton
- 1974–1975: Memphis Southmen (GM)
- 1976: New York Giants (DRD)
- 1980–1994: San Francisco 49ers (VP)
- 1995: San Francisco 49ers (SA)
- 1998–1999: San Francisco 49ers (GM)

Head coaching record
- Overall: 41–7–2 (high school); 37–41–4 (college); 24–7 (WFL); 14–23 (NFL)

Accomplishments and honors

Awards
- First-team All-MAC (1952); NFL Executive of the Year (1989); San Francisco 49ers Hall of Fame

John Edward McVay (January 5, 1931 – October 31, 2022) was an American football coach and executive. He rose through the coaching ranks from high school, through the college level, and to the National Football League (NFL). He played college football at Miami University in Ohio, starring as a center.

== Early life ==
McVay was born in Bellaire, Ohio. McVay later moved to Massillon where he played high school football for Massillon Washington High School and was named second-team All-Ohio. McVay played college football at Miami University. He later married and had three boys, John, Jim, and Tim. His grandson, Sean McVay, son of Tim, is currently the head coach of the Los Angeles Rams.

McVay coached at several Ohio high schools, Michigan State University as an assistant coach, and then head coach at the University of Dayton.

== Coaching career ==
McVay became the head coach of the World Football League Memphis Southmen (also known as the Memphis Grizzlies) in 1974, the WFL's first season. His record at Memphis was 24–7; the league folded in 1975. In 1976, he went to the NFL New York Giants as an assistant coach of research and development under fellow Miami alumnus Bill Arnsparger. After opening with seven losses, Arnsparger was fired in late October and McVay was promoted. From 1976 to 1978, McVay struggled with a franchise in transition. After taking over midway through the 1976 season, McVay had 2 seasoned veterans at quarterback (Craig Morton, and Norm Snead) ...... in his first full NFL season with the team (1977), McVay was dealing with the opposite extreme in that the Giants' roster that season consisted of three rookie quarterbacks. His contract with the Giants was not renewed after the 1978 season, most likely as the result of a famous loss to the Philadelphia Eagles on November 19.

== Executive career ==
McVay moved on to an administrative position with the San Francisco 49ers in 1980. He collaborated with head coach Bill Walsh in one of the most successful dynasties in NFL history. As vice president/director of football operations, he presided over five Super Bowl-winning seasons. He was named NFL Executive of the Year in 1989. He retired from the 49ers in 1996. But when the franchise was transferred from Eddie DeBartolo Jr. to his sister, Denise, the York family wanted a steady hand like McVay's in the front office during the transition. McVay agreed to come back in 1998 and stayed for two more seasons.

== Personal life and death ==
McVay's grandson, Sean, at the age of 30, became the youngest head coach in NFL history after he was hired by the Los Angeles Rams in 2017. Sean subsequently became the youngest head coach to win a Super Bowl when in 2022 he won Super Bowl LVI.

McVay died on October 31, 2022, at the age of 91.

== Head coaching record ==
=== College ===
Year	Team	Overall	Conference	Standing	Bowl/playoffs
Dayton Flyers (NCAA University Division independent) (1965–1972)
1965	Dayton	1–8–1			
1966	Dayton	8–2			
1967	Dayton	6–3–1			
1968	Dayton	5–5			
1969	Dayton	3–7			
1970	Dayton	5–4–1			
1971	Dayton	5–6			
1972	Dayton	4–6–1			
Dayton:		37–41–4			
Total:		37–41–4			

=== Professional ===
Team	Year	Regular season					Postseason			
Team	Year	Won	Lost	Ties	Win %	Finish	Won	Lost	Win %	Result
NYG	1976	3	4	0	.429	5th in NFC East	–	–	–	–
NYG	1977	5	9	0	.357	T–4th in NFC East	–	–	–	–
NYG	1978	6	10	0	.375	5th in NFC East	–	–	–	–
Total		14	23	0	.378		–	–	–	–
