= Joe Dawkins =

American football player (born 1948)

No. 34, 33, 26
- Position: Running back

Personal information
- Born: January 27, 1948 (age 78); Los Angeles, California, U.S.
- Listed height: 6 ft 0 in (1.83 m)
- Listed weight: 223 lb (101 kg)

Career information
- High school: John C. Fremont (Los Angeles)
- College: Wisconsin
- NFL draft: 1970: 10th round, 249th overall pick

Career history
- Houston Oilers (1970–1971); Denver Broncos (1971–1973); New York Giants (1974–1975); Houston Oilers (1976)

Career NFL statistics
- Rushing attempts: 698
- Rushing yards: 2,661
- Rushing TDs: 13
- Receptions: 145
- Receiving yards: 1,316
- Receiving TDs: 3
- Stats at Pro Football Reference

Joseph Dawkins, III (born January 27, 1948) is an American former professional football player who was a running back in the National Football League (NFL) for the Houston Oilers, Denver Broncos, and the New York Giants. He played college football for the Wisconsin Badgers and was selected in the 10th round of the 1970 NFL draft.

== NFL career statistics ==
Legend
**Bold**	Career high

Year	Team	Games		Rushing					Receiving				
Year	Team	GP	GS	Att	Yds	Avg	Lng	TD	Rec	Yds	Avg	Lng	TD
1970	HOU	**14**	7	124	517	4.2	49	**2**	15	94	6.3	17	0
1971	HOU	8	0	0	0	0.0	0	0	0	0	0.0	0	0
1971	DEN	6	5	42	135	3.2	21	**2**	9	53	5.9	13	0
1972	DEN	**14**	5	56	243	4.3	19	**2**	18	242	**13.4**	**60**	0
1973	DEN	**14**	**14**	**160**	**706**	**4.4**	**72**	**2**	30	329	11.0	42	0
1974	NYG	**14**	13	156	561	3.6	16	**2**	**46**	**332**	7.2	51	**3**
1975	NYG	**14**	12	129	438	3.4	15	**2**	24	245	10.2	39	0
1976	HOU	**14**	1	31	61	2.0	7	1	3	21	7.0	14	0
		98	57	698	2,661	3.8	72	13	145	1,316	9.1	60	3
