= Bob Grim (American football) =

American football player (born 1945)

No. 27, 26
- Positions: Wide receiver, return specialist

Personal information
- Born: May 8, 1945 (age 81); Oakland, California, U.S.
- Listed height: 6 ft 0 in (1.83 m)
- Listed weight: 200 lb (91 kg)

Career information
- High school: Red Bluff (Red Bluff, California)
- College: Oregon State
- NFL draft: 1967: 2nd round, 28th overall pick

Career history
- Minnesota Vikings (1967–1971); New York Giants (1972–1974); Chicago Bears (1975); Minnesota Vikings (1976–1977)

Awards and highlights
- NFL champion (1969); Pro Bowl (1971); Second-team All-Pac-8 (1966)

Career NFL statistics
- Receptions: 194
- Receiving yards: 2,914
- Receiving touchdowns: 16
- Return yards: 831
- Stats at Pro Football Reference

Robert Lee Grim (born May 8, 1945) is an American former professional wide receiver in the National Football League (NFL). He played in the league from 1967 to 1977.

== High school and college career ==
He played high school football at Red Bluff High School and college football at Oregon State University. In 1964, as a sophomore, he started at left end for the Beavers, helping to lead the team to the 1965 Rose Bowl. The 1965 Rose Bowl remains Oregon State's last Rose Bowl appearance.

== Professional career ==
After the 1966–1967 NFL football season, the Minnesota Vikings traded Fran Tarkenton for four draft picks in the 1967 NFL draft. The Vikings used one of the four, a second round draft pick, to acquire Grim 28th overall. He played with them for five seasons, helping them to the 1969 NFL championship and a Super Bowl IV appearance. He was traded along with Norm Snead, Vince Clements, a first rounder in 1972 (24th overall–Larry Jacobson) and a second rounder in 1973 (40th overall–Brad Van Pelt) from the Vikings to the Giants for Fran Tarkenton on January 27, 1972. He played with the Giants for three seasons and the Chicago Bears for a season. Grim ended his career, playing with Fran Tarkenton and the Vikings for his final two seasons, helping the team to the 1976 NFC championship and a Super Bowl XI appearance. Grim ended his career having played in 133 total games.

== NFL career statistics ==
Legend
	Won the NFL championship
**Bold**	Career high

=== Regular season ===
Year	Team	Games		Receiving				
Year	Team	GP	GS	Rec	Yds	Avg	Lng	TD
1967	MIN	13	2	6	108	18.0	26	1
1968	MIN	2	0	0	0	0.0	0	0
1969	MIN	14	0	10	155	15.5	44	1
1970	MIN	14	9	23	287	12.5	35	0
1971	MIN	14	14	**45**	**691**	15.4	55	**7**
1972	NYG	13	0	5	67	13.4	17	1
1973	NYG	14	14	37	593	16.0	48	2
1974	NYG	14	14	28	466	16.6	53	2
1975	CHI	14	13	28	374	13.4	**57**	2
1976	MIN	8	0	9	108	12.0	27	0
1977	MIN	14	0	3	65	**21.7**	23	0
		134	66	194	2,914	15.0	57	16

=== Playoffs ===
Year	Team	Games		Receiving				
Year	Team	GP	GS	Rec	Yds	Avg	Lng	TD
1968	MIN	1	0	0	0	0.0	0	0
1969	MIN	3	0	0	0	0.0	0	0
1970	MIN	1	0	2	37	**18.5**	19	0
1971	MIN	1	1	**4**	**74**	**18.5**	**49**	0
1976	MIN	3	0	1	10	10.0	10	0
1977	MIN	2	0	0	0	0.0	0	0
		11	1	7	121	17.3	49	0

== Post-playing career ==
After retiring from the NFL, Grim became a broadcaster. He spent close to two decades as a color commentator on the radio broadcasts of his alma mater, Oregon State, where he worked alongside longtime OSU radio voices Darrell Aune and Mike Parker. Grim retired from the position after the Beavers' 2003 season, and was replaced by former offensive lineman Jim Wilson.
