= Walker Gillette =

American football player (born 1947)

No. 84
- Position: Wide receiver

Personal information
- Born: March 16, 1947 (age 79); Norfolk, Virginia, U.S.
- Listed height: 6 ft 5 in (1.96 m)
- Listed weight: 200 lb (91 kg)

Career information
- High school: Southampton (Courtland, Virginia)
- College: Richmond (1966-1969)
- NFL draft: 1970: 1st round, 15th overall pick

Career history
- San Diego Chargers (1970–1971); St. Louis Cardinals (1972–1973); New York Giants (1974–1976)

Awards and highlights
- Consensus All-American (1969)

Career NFL statistics
- Receptions: 153
- Receiving yards: 2,291
- Receiving touchdowns: 12
- Stats at Pro Football Reference

Walker Adams Gillette (born March 16, 1947) is an American former professional football player who was a wide receiver in the National Football League (NFL) for the San Diego Chargers, St. Louis Cardinals, and the New York Giants. He played college football for the Richmond Spiders and was selected 15th overall in the first round of the 1970 NFL draft. Gillette's father, Jim Gillette, also played in the NFL.

In 1990, Gillette was inducted into the Virginia Sports Hall of Fame.

== NFL career statistics ==
Legend
**Bold**	Career high

Year	Team	Games		Receiving				
Year	Team	GP	GS	Rec	Yds	Avg	Lng	TD
1970	SDG	13	0	2	21	10.5	12	0
1971	SDG	12	1	10	147	14.7	25	2
1972	STL	**14**	13	33	550	**16.7**	65	2
1973	STL	**14**	9	20	244	12.2	48	1
1974	NYG	11	7	29	466	16.1	**72**	**3**
1975	NYG	**14**	**14**	**43**	**600**	14.0	50	2
1976	NYG	13	7	16	263	16.4	62	2
		91	51	153	2,291	15.0	72	12
