= Bill Arnsparger =

American football coach (1926–2015)

Biographical details
- Born: December 16, 1926; Paris, Kentucky, U.S.
- Died: July 17, 2015 (aged 88); Athens, Alabama, U.S.
- Education: Miami (OH)

Coaching career (HC unless noted)
- 1950: Miami (OH) (DL)
- 1951–1953: Ohio State (DL)
- 1954–1961: Kentucky (DL)
- 1962–1963: Tulane (DL)
- 1964–1969: Baltimore Colts (DL)
- 1970–1972: Miami Dolphins (DC/LB)
- 1973: Miami Dolphins (AHC/DC)
- 1974–1976: New York Giants
- 1976–1983: Miami Dolphins (AHC/DC)
- 1984–1986: LSU
- 1992–1994: San Diego Chargers (DC)

Administrative career (AD unless noted)
- 1986–1992: Florida

Head coaching record
- Overall: 7–28 (NFL); 26–8–2 (college)

Accomplishments and honors

Championships
- As head coach: SEC (1986); As assistant coach: 2× Super Bowl champion (VII, VIII); NFL champion (1968)

Awards
- 2× SEC Coach of the Year (1984, 1986)

William Stephen Arnsparger (December 16, 1926 – July 17, 2015) was an American college and professional football coach. He was born and raised in Paris, Kentucky, served in the United States Marine Corps during World War II, and graduated from Miami University (Ohio) in 1950. Immediately upon graduation, Arnsparger was hired as an assistant coach with the Miami football program, beginning a long career in the profession.

Arnsparger is best known for two stints as the defensive coordinator for the Miami Dolphins of the National Football League (NFL). The Dolphins won consecutive Super Bowls (1972 and 1973) during his first tenure and reached another Super Bowl in 1982 during his second, all under head coach Don Shula. Arnsparger's defenses were an important part of the Dolphins' success, and they earned nicknames in different decades – the "No-Name-Defense" in the 1970s and the "Killer B's" in the 1980s.

Arnsparger served as a defensive assistant for several college football teams before moving to the NFL, and his first job in the league was as an assistant with the Baltimore Colts, also under Shula. Between his two stints with the Dolphins, Arnsparger served as the head coach of the New York Giants in the mid-1970s, and after his second stint in Miami, he served as the head coach of the Louisiana State University (LSU) Tigers in the mid-1980s. He left LSU to accept the position of athletic director at the University of Florida, a post he held from 1986 until 1992, when he returned to the professional coaching ranks as the defensive coordinator of the San Diego Chargers. He retired after helping lead the Chargers to their first Super Bowl berth in 1994.

== Early years ==
Arnsparger was born in Paris, Kentucky, in 1926. He attended Paris High School, where he was an all-state football player under the school's longtime football and basketball coach, Blanton Collier. The relationship would have a major impact on his future career.

After serving in the United States Marines during World War II, Arnsparger attended Miami University in Oxford, Ohio, where he played for the Miami football team under coach Woody Hayes and was a member of Sigma Chi fraternity (Alpha chapter). He graduated with bachelor's and master's degrees in 1950.

== College assistant coach ==
=== Miami University ===
After graduating, Arnsparger remained at Miami to begin his coaching career as an assistant under Hayes for the 1950 season. Miami went 9-1 and were Mid-American Conference champions.

=== Ohio State ===
Woody Hayes was hired as the head coach of the Ohio State Buckeyes in 1951 and brought Arnsparger with him from Miami to serve as the Buckeyes' line coach, a position he held through the 1954 season.

=== Kentucky ===
In 1954, Arnsparger re-connected with his high school coach Blanton Collier, who had been hired as head football coach at the University of Kentucky in Lexington, Kentucky. Arnsparger was hired as defensive line coach at Kentucky and remained there for the eight years until Collier was fired on January 2, 1962. During the 1959 season, Kentucky hired a new secondary coach who had served at the University of Virginia the previous year. That coach was Don Shula, with the two coaches forging a strong bond that would tie them for much of the next quarter century.

=== Tulane ===
Arnsparger moved on to an assistant position with Tulane University in New Orleans, in 1962. After two years, he resigned the post on March 6, 1964, to become the defensive line coach for the Baltimore Colts under Shula.

== National Football League ==
=== Baltimore Colts ===
In 1964, Arnsparger became the defensive line coach for the Baltimore Colts of the National Football League (NFL). That season, the Colts reached the NFL Championship Game and remained one of the strongest teams of the 1960s, competing in Super Bowl III on January 12, 1969.

=== Miami Dolphins ===
When Shula left to become head coach with the Miami Dolphins after the end of the 1969 NFL season, he brought along Arnsparger, who was promoted to defensive coordinator and linebackers coach. He added the title of assistant head coach in 1973. In just two seasons, the formerly moribund team had reached the Super Bowl, with Arnsparger fashioning what became known as the "No-Name Defense." World championships in each of the next two seasons, including an undefeated season during 1972, made Arnsparger a prime candidate for a head coaching position.

=== New York Giants ===
Following the Dolphins' 24–7 victory over the Minnesota Vikings in Super Bowl VIII, Arnsparger was named head coach of the New York Giants, but managed just seven wins in his thirty-five games. Arnsparger coached the Giants in three different home stadiums during his tenure: the Yale Bowl in New Haven, Connecticut, in 1974; Shea Stadium, home of the cross-town rival Jets in 1975; and finally, Giants Stadium in 1976. Arnsparger was fired in mid-season on October 25, with the team having lost all seven of its games, succeeded by assistant coach John McVay.

=== Return to the Dolphins ===
Just two days after his dismissal from the Giants, Arnsparger was rehired by Shula and was restored to his previous position as defensive coordinator and assistant head coach. In the team's first game under his leadership, the Dolphins won a 10–3 defensive battle with the New England Patriots, who had averaged thirty points per game entering the contest.

Miami finished the 1976 NFL season with a 6–8 mark, then narrowly missed a playoff berth the following season. During the next two seasons, the Dolphins reached the postseason, but dropped their first playoff game. During the strike-shortened 1982 NFL season, Miami reached Super Bowl XVII, but dropped a 27–17 decision to the Washington Redskins. Arnsparger again had created an elite defensive unit, known as the Killer B's (so named because of the number of surnames beginning with "B" on the Dolphins defense).

== LSU head coach ==
On December 2, 1983, Arnsparger was introduced as the head football coach at Louisiana State University (LSU), though he stayed on as the Dolphins' defensive coordinator until the end of the NFL season. As the Tigers' head coach, Arnsparger led LSU to two Sugar Bowl berths in three seasons, in 1984 and 1986, both times against Nebraska. In 1984, LSU finished second behind Florida, nosing out Auburn by a single game. However, the Southeastern Conference (SEC) presidents voted to bar Florida from postseason play due to NCAA rules violations and awarded the conference's automatic berth in the Sugar Bowl to LSU instead. His 1986 LSU squad won the school's first outright SEC title since 1970 and what would be the Tigers' last in the pre-championship game era, though the season was marred somewhat by an upset home loss to Miami University, his alma mater.

By 1985, Arnsparger was growing frustrated with various scandals in the LSU athletic department, particularly involving basketball coach Dale Brown. After Sports Illustrated ran a cover story about the university's issues, Arnsparger met privately with athletic director Bob Brodhead to complain that the negative coverage was harming football recruiting and to threaten to leave the school if something wasn't done. Shortly after the final regular season game in 1986, Arnsparger announced he was resigning to become the athletic director at Florida.

== University of Florida athletic director ==
At Florida, Arnsparger was tasked with cleaning up an athletic department which had been roiled by NCAA violations and subsequent punishments. The Florida Gators football team had been found in violation of many NCAA rules in the early 1980s and was still suffering under significant sanctions and probation when Arnsparger arrived, a situation which weakened the financial strength of the entire athletic department.

More problems surfaced in 1989. Head football coach Galen Hall was accused of committing minor rules violations, which became a major issue with the NCAA because of the just-completed probation. Though Hall denied the allegations, he was forced to resign in the middle of the 1989 season, and the football program was placed back on NCAA probation the following year. At about the same time, the NCAA was investigating allegations that the Florida Gators men's basketball program had allowed sports agents to pay star players. Less than a month after Hall's resignation and just days before the start of the 1989–90 basketball season, long-time head basketball coach Norm Sloan was forced to take an early retirement and his entire coaching staff was dismissed. Sloan subsequently claimed that the allegations were false and that Arnsparger's zealous attempts to clean up Florida's athletic department turned into a "witch hunt" that unfairly punished him and his staff. Later, in 1990, Sloan claimed Arnsparger and other administrators "panicked" at the prospect of the basketball team being hit with a "death penalty" due to previous sanctions against the football team. Under NCAA rules, if a school is placed on probation twice in five years, the sport involved in the second violation faces having at least one season canceled. Former Tennessee coach Don DeVoe was quickly hired as interim basketball coach, but despite being the defending SEC champions, the team struggled to a 7–21 record and DeVoe was not retained.

Despite having both of the university's marquee sports placed on NCAA probation in 1990, Arnsparger was able to rebuild Florida's athletic program by establishing better compliance procedures and by hiring new coaches who would bring success while following NCAA guidelines. In December 1989, Arnsparger hired Duke University's Steve Spurrier as Florida's new football coach. Spurrier, who had won the Heisman Trophy as Florida's quarterback in 1966, would become the school's all-time wins leader in his twelve years in Gainesville, leading the Gators to their first six conference titles and the 1996 national championship. After the basketball team's disappointing 1989–90 season, Arnsparger hired Lon Kruger as Florida's new coach. Kruger led the Gators to their first Final Four appearance in 1994 and set the stage for later and greater success under Billy Donovan. The university's overall athletic program improved under Arnsparger; Florida won its first three SEC All-Sports Trophies during his tenure, beginning an ongoing period in which the Gator sports program has been named the conference's best for 28 out of the next 32 years.

During his time at Florida, Arnsparger was thought by some athletic department staff and boosters to be "domineering" and that, keeping with his background in coaching, he was "inflexible... sticking by his game plan at all costs.". In hindsight, observers gave him credit for setting up the university's athletic department for unprecedented success after his tenure. Jeremy Foley, Arnsparger's successor as athletic director, credited him with "helping to right the ship during a very difficult time at the University of Florida."

== Return to the NFL ==
On January 13, 1992, Arnsparger resigned to become the defensive coordinator of the San Diego Chargers. During his three seasons with the Chargers, the team's defense showed marked improvement, culminating with a berth in Super Bowl XXIX. Just days after the team's Super Bowl appearance, Arnsparger announced his retirement, citing the prostate cancer surgery he had undergone the year before.

== Later life and death ==
Arnsparger retired in 1995 and split time between homes in Kentucky and Alabama. Soon after, his son David became the football coach at West Limestone High School in northern Alabama, and the elder Arnsparger often visited practices as a volunteer assistant coach.

After several years of deteriorating health, Arnsparger died on July 17, 2015, at his home in Athens, Alabama, at the age of 88. He was survived by his wife, his son David, his daughter Mary Susan, and his grandchildren Stephen, Christian, Sarah, Elisabeth, and Callie. He is buried at Paris Cemetery, at Paris, Kentucky.

== Head coaching record ==
=== NFL ===
| Team | Year | Regular season | | | | | Postseason | | | |
| Team | Year | Won | Lost | Ties | Win % | Finish | Won | Lost | Win % | Result |
|---|---|---|---|---|---|---|---|---|---|---|
| NYG | 1974 | 2 | 12 | 0 | .143 | 5th in NFC East | – | – | – | – |
| NYG | 1975 | 5 | 9 | 0 | .357 | 4th in NFC East | – | – | – | – |
| NYG | 1976 | 0 | 7 | 0 | .000 | Fired | – | – | – | – |
| Total | | 7 | 28 | 0 | .200 | | – | – | – | |

=== College ===
| Year | Team | Overall | Conference | Standing | Bowl/playoffs | Coaches^{#} | AP^{°} |
|---|---|---|---|---|---|---|---|
LSU Tigers (Southeastern Conference) (1984–1986)
| 1984 | LSU | 8–3–1 | 4–1–1 | 2nd | L Sugar | 16 | 15 |
| 1985 | LSU | 9–2–1 | 4–1–1 | T–2nd | L Liberty | 20 | 20 |
| 1986 | LSU | 9–3 | 5–1 | 1st | L Sugar | 11 | 10 |
| LSU: | | 26–8–2 | 13–3–2 | | | | |
| Total: | | 26–8–2 | | | | | |
National championship Conference title Conference division title or championship game berth
^{#}Rankings from final Coaches Poll.; ^{°}Rankings from final AP Poll.

== See also ==
- Florida Gators
- List of Miami University people
- List of Sigma Chi members
- LSU Tigers
- University Athletic Association
