= Vince Clements =

American football player (born 1949)

No. 29
- Position: Running back

Personal information
- Born: January 4, 1949 (age 77); Southington, Connecticut, U.S.
- Listed height: 6 ft 3 in (1.91 m)
- Listed weight: 210 lb (95 kg)

Career information
- High school: Southington
- College: Connecticut
- NFL draft: 1971: 4th round, 102nd overall pick

Career history
- New York Giants (1972–1973); The Hawaiians (1974-1975)

Awards and highlights
- Second-team All-American (1970); 3× First-team All-Yankee Conference (1968-1970)

Career NFL statistics
- Rushing attempts: 103
- Rushing yards: 435
- Rushing TDs: 1
- Stats at Pro Football Reference

Vince Clements (born January 4, 1949) is an American former professional football player who was a running back for the New York Giants of the National Football League (NFL) from 1972 to 1973. He was acquired by the Giants along with Norm Snead, Bob Grim, a first rounder in 1972 (24th overall–Larry Jacobson) and a second rounder in 1973 (40th overall–Brad Van Pelt) from the Minnesota Vikings for Fran Tarkenton on January 27, 1972.

Before his professional career, Clements played college football for Connecticut, where he was a major contributor on the team.
