= Ralph Hill (American football) =

American football player (born 1949)

Personal information
- Born: November 10, 1949 (age 76); Chicago, Illinois

Career information
- College: Florida A&M

Career history
- Memphis Southmen (1974-1975); New York Giants (1976-1977)
- Stats at Pro Football Reference

Ralph Hill (born November 10, 1949) is a former NFL football player with the New York Giants during the 1970s, playing in the center position.
