= Doug Kotar =

American football player (1951–1983)

No. 44
- Position: Running back

Personal information
- Born: June 11, 1951; Canonsburg, Pennsylvania, U.S.
- Died: December 16, 1983 (aged 32); Pittsburgh, Pennsylvania, U.S.
- Listed height: 5 ft 11 in (1.80 m)
- Listed weight: 205 lb (93 kg)

Career information
- High school: Canon-McMillan (PA)
- College: Kentucky
- NFL draft: 1974: undrafted

Career history
- Pittsburgh Steelers (1974)*; New York Giants (1974–1981)
- * Offseason or practice squad member only

Career NFL statistics
- Rushing attempts: 900
- Rushing yards: 3,380
- Rushing touchdowns: 20
- Stats at Pro Football Reference

Douglas Allan Kotar (June 11, 1951 – December 16, 1983) was an American professional football player who was a running back for the New York Giants of the National Football League (NFL). He played college football for the Kentucky Wildcats.

== Early life ==
Raised in Muse, Pennsylvania, southwest of Pittsburgh, Kotar graduated from Canon-McMillan High School and played college football at the University of Kentucky in Lexington.

== Career ==
Unselected in the 1974 NFL draft, Kotar was signed as an undrafted free agent by the Pittsburgh Steelers. Four days later, they traded him to the New York Giants (for Leo Gasienica), where he played for eight years. Linebacker Harry Carson, a teammate for six seasons, once described him as "a fighter you'd like to have with you in a foxhole."

Kotar rushed for 3,380 yards (while also gaining 1,022 yards receiving) in his career, which was the fourth most in Giants history at the time of his retirement. Kotar was known for leading with his head while rushing, a fact that would come back to haunt him in later life. He retired after the first day of training camp in July 1982, citing knee and shoulder pain and family reasons.

== NFL career statistics ==
Legend
**Bold**	Career high

Year	Team	Games		Rushing					Receiving				
Year	Team	GP	GS	Att	Yds	Avg	Lng	TD	Rec	Yds	Avg	Lng	TD
1974	NYG	12	7	106	396	3.7	**53**	4	10	57	5.7	18	0
1975	NYG	14	6	122	378	3.1	46	**6**	9	86	9.6	17	0
1976	NYG	14	**14**	**185**	**731**	4.0	24	3	**36**	**319**	8.9	30	0
1977	NYG	12	11	132	480	3.6	32	2	15	73	4.9	13	0
1978	NYG	15	5	149	625	**4.2**	46	1	22	225	**10.2**	31	**1**
1979	NYG	**16**	**14**	160	616	3.9	32	3	25	230	9.2	**37**	0
1981	NYG	7	5	46	154	3.3	18	1	9	32	3.6	11	0
		90	62	900	3,380	3.8	53	20	126	1,022	8.1	37	1

== Personal life ==
Kotar and his wife Donna had two children, Doug Jr. and Christie.

== Death ==
After experiencing major headaches post-retirement, Kotar had a CT scan that revealed a brain tumor. He underwent invasive surgery in August 1982 that involved cutting into his skull, but the tumor was malignant and could not be removed. Kotar later suffered partial paralysis and was moved back to his hometown, where he received radiation treatment.

On December 16, 1983, Kotar died in his sleep at age 32.
