= Dave Simonson =

American football player (born 1952)

- Simonson in 1974

No. 60, 67, 71, 62, 79
- Position: Tackle

Personal information
- Born: May 2, 1952 (age 74); Austin, Minnesota, U.S.
- Listed height: 6 ft 6 in (1.98 m)
- Listed weight: 246 lb (112 kg)

Career information
- High school: Austin
- College: Minnesota
- NFL draft: 1974: 12th round, 292nd overall pick

Career history
- Baltimore Colts (1974); New York Giants (1975); Houston Oilers (1976); Seattle Seahawks (1976); Detroit Lions (1977)

Career NFL statistics
- Games played: 29
- Stats at Pro Football Reference

David Arnold Simonson (born May 2, 1952) is an American former professional football player who was a tackle in the National Football League (NFL) for five different teams over a four-season career running from 1974 to 1977. He played college football for the Minnesota Golden Gophers.

== Biography ==
=== Early life ===
Dave Simonson was born May 2, 1952, in Austin, Minnesota, where he attended Austin High School. He was a star wrestler and football player during his high school years.

=== College career ===
He attended college at the University of Minnesota, where he was again a two-sport athlete, playing football and wrestling. He spent his first two years on the Gophers football squad as a reserve, mired on the depth chart behind established starting tackles Bart Buetow and Dennis Maloney.

His football career was endangered ahead of his junior year when in May 1972 he suffered a serious neck injury in spring football practice. He was fortunately able to successfully rehabilitate his injury. He continued to compete as a top tier collegiate wrestler for Minnesota as well, racking up an 18–4 record in 1972–73, and finishing second in the heavyweight division of the 1973 Big Ten Wrestling Championship.

=== Professional career ===
Simonson was selected by the Baltimore Colts in the 12th round of the 1974 NFL draft, with the Colts making him the 292nd overall selection. Simonson expressed intrigue at the possibility of a pro football career, telling the Minneapolis Star Tribune, "I'm just glad that somebody drafted me and I'm anxious to give it a try. I've toyed with the idea of pro wrestling but I'd like to see what happens with football first."

He played in 13 games for Baltimore during his 1974 rookie season, primarily on special teams. He saw very limited game action as an offensive lineman, playing, for example, the last eight minutes of the team's season opener against the Pittsburgh Steelers. In making the Colts' team, Simonson became the first resident of Austin, Minnesota, to make a roster in the NFL.

With a year in the league under his belt, Simonson confided to a friendly reporter, "I expected to be drafted, but not by the Colts. Dallas gave me every indication they were going to draft me — they even sent me the pen to sign a contract with. Kansas City and Atlanta also showed great interest, but I had no inkling about Baltimore."

His time in Baltimore proved fleeting, with the Colts releasing him on September 9, 1975, less than two weeks before the start of the 1975 NFL season. He was briefly out of the league until being signed by the New York Giants in December. He ultimately saw action in two games for the Giants at the end of the team's 1975 season.

In the summer of 1976, Simonson changed jerseys again, this time traded on August 25 to the Houston Oilers. After appearing in two games for Houston, he was again released on September 22nd, landing a spot on the roster of the expansion Seattle Seahawks one week later. He would remain on the team for the rest of the year, appearing in a total of five games for the Hawks.

On September 7, 1977, with the 1977 NFL season around the corner, Simonson was released again, remaining out of football until being picked up by his fifth — and final — NFL team on October 25, when he signed a free agent contract with the Detroit Lions. He saw action in 7 games for the Lions during 1975, effectively wrapping up a four year career in the NFL. His tenure in the league was sufficient to vest for a pension at age 55.

=== Personal life ===
Simonson returned home to Austin, Minnesota, and became an officer in the Austin Police Department in February 1980, rising to the rank of lieutenant by 1990. He also served a stint as chairman of the Austin School Board.

Simonson met his wife, Connie, a teacher, in 1975. The couple subsequently raised three children.

He also worked as an assistant coach for the Austin High School wrestling team.

Simonson was inducted into the Austin High School Athletic Hall of Fame in 1990.

"Athletics leaves you with some aches and pains," he told a local newspaper reporter in 1990. "You have to keep things in perspective and be realistic."
