= Bob Tucker (American football) =

American football player (born 1945)

No. 38
- Position: Tight end

Personal information
- Born: June 8, 1945 (age 81); Hazleton, Pennsylvania, U.S.
- Listed height: 6 ft 3 in (1.91 m)
- Listed weight: 230 lb (104 kg)

Career information
- High school: Hazleton, Pennsylvania
- College: Bloomsburg
- NFL draft: 1968: undrafted

Career history
- Boston Patriots (1968)*; Philadelphia Eagles (1969)*; New York Giants (1970–1977); Minnesota Vikings (1977–1980)
- * Offseason or practice squad member only

Awards and highlights
- 43rd greatest New York Giant of all-time

Career NFL statistics
- Receptions: 422
- Receiving yards: 5,421
- Receiving TDs: 27
- Stats at Pro Football Reference

Robert Louis Tucker (born June 8, 1945) is an American former professional football player who was a tight end in the National Football League (NFL). A 6'3", 230 lb. tight end from Bloomsburg State College, Tucker played for 11 seasons in the NFL, from 1970 to 1977 for the New York Giants and 1977 to 1980 for the Minnesota Vikings.

In 1971 Tucker became the first NFL tight end to lead the league in receptions, topping the NFC with 59 catches for the Giants.

Prior to joining the NFL, Tucker lettered in football and basketball at Hazleton High. At Bloomsburg State College, Tucker set three NAIA pass receiving records and went on to establish league records with the Pottstown the Pottstown Firebirds, whom he played for in the Atlantic Coast Football League, along with the Lowell Giants. In 1969, He was a member of the Philadelphia Eagles taxi squad in 1969, and signed in 1970 as a free agent with the New York Giants.

Tucker is one of the few Giants to play for the team in four different home stadiums: Yankee Stadium (1970 through the first two home games of 1973); the Yale Bowl (last five home games of 1973 and all of 1974); Shea Stadium (1975) and Giants Stadium (1976–77). He lived in Lincroft, a neighborhood in Middletown Township, New Jersey.

Tucker was inducted into the American Football Association's Semi Pro Football Hall of Fame in 1982.

Tucker was a biology teacher and freshman football coach at Acton-Boxborough Regional High School in Acton, Massachusetts in 1969.

== NFL career statistics ==
Legend
**Bold**	Career high

=== Regular season ===
Year	Team	Games		Receiving				
Year	Team	GP	GS	Rec	Yds	Avg	Lng	TD
1970	NYG	14	13	40	571	**14.3**	41	**5**
1971	NYG	12	12	**59**	**791**	13.4	**63**	4
1972	NYG	14	14	55	764	13.9	39	4
1973	NYG	14	14	50	681	13.6	33	**5**
1974	NYG	13	13	41	496	12.1	29	2
1975	NYG	14	14	34	484	14.2	47	1
1976	NYG	14	14	42	498	11.9	39	1
1977	NYG	5	4	6	91	15.2	22	0
1977	MIN	8	0	9	109	12.1	29	2
1978	MIN	**16**	**16**	47	540	11.5	35	0
1979	MIN	**16**	15	24	223	9.3	21	2
1980	MIN	**16**	13	15	173	11.5	25	1
		156	142	422	5,421	12.8	63	27

=== Playoffs ===
Year	Team	Games		Receiving				
Year	Team	GP	GS	Rec	Yds	Avg	Lng	TD
1977	MIN	**2**	0	0	0	0.0	0	0
1978	MIN	1	**1**	**4**	**48**	**12.0**	**21**	0
1980	MIN	1	**1**	0	0	0.0	0	0
		4	2	4	48	12.0	21	0

== See also ==
- History of the New York Giants (1925–78)
- Pottstown Firebirds
