= Charlie Ford (American football) =

American football player (1948–2022)

No. 32, 45, 27
- Position: Cornerback

Personal information
- Born: December 10, 1948; Beaumont, Texas, U.S.
- Died: August 24, 2022 (aged 73); Beaumont, Texas, U.S.
- Listed height: 6 ft 3 in (1.91 m)
- Listed weight: 185 lb (84 kg)

Career information
- High school: Beaumont (TX)
- College: Houston
- NFL draft: 1971: 2nd round, 36th overall pick

Career history
- Chicago Bears (1971–1973); Philadelphia Eagles (1974); Buffalo Bills (1975); New York Giants (1975)

Career NFL statistics
- Interceptions: 15
- Fumble recoveries: 4
- Stats at Pro Football Reference

Charles Glenn Ford (December 10, 1948 – August 24, 2022) was an American professional football cornerback in the National Football League (NFL) for the Chicago Bears, the Philadelphia Eagles, the Buffalo Bills, and the New York Giants. He played college football at the University of Houston and was drafted in the second round of the 1971 NFL draft.
