= Carl Wafer =

American football player (born 1951)

No. 72, 78
- Position: Defensive end

Personal information
- Born: January 17, 1951 (age 75); Magnolia, Arkansas, U.S.
- Listed height: 6 ft 4 in (1.93 m)
- Listed weight: 250 lb (113 kg)

Career information
- High school: Dallas (Dallas, Texas)
- College: Tennessee State (1970–1973)
- NFL draft: 1974: 2nd round, 42nd overall pick

Career history
- Denver Broncos (1974)*; Green Bay Packers (1974); New York Giants (1974–1975)
- * Offseason or practice squad member only

Career NFL statistics
- Games played: 3
- Stats at Pro Football Reference

Carl Wafer (born January 17, 1951) is an American former professional football player who was a defensive end for one season in the National Football League (NFL) with the Green Bay Packers and New York Giants. He played college football for the Tennessee State Tigers and was selected in the second round of the 1974 NFL draft by the Denver Broncos.

== Early life ==
Wafer was born on January 17, 1951, in Magnolia, Arkansas. He attended Dallas High School in Texas, where he competed in football as a linebacker, being a four-year varsity team member. After high school, he enrolled at Tennessee State University (TSU) in 1970 and played for the Tigers. At Tennessee State, he majored in health and physical education.

Wafer played for TSU from 1970 to 1973, receiving varsity letters each year. Playing linebacker and defensive end, he was part of the Tigers' defense that helped the team compile undefeated records in 1970 and 1973 with Black college national championships in 1970, 1971, and 1973. The 1973 Tigers compiled a record of 10–0 and were named small college national champions, winning each game by an average margin of over 24 points. In his collegiate career, he was part of a team that won 41 out of 43 total games played.

== Professional career ==
Wafer was selected in the second round (42nd overall) of the 1974 NFL draft by the Denver Broncos. He was one of five TSU players selected in the first two rounds of the draft. The Tennessean described Wafer's selection as the "biggest surprise" of the early rounds of the draft, as others had projected him to be picked between the fifth and ninth rounds. According to the Associated Press, Wafer was "something of an unknown" going into the draft, but Broncos coach John Ralston explained that the team viewed Wafer as the best defensive player still available, on the advice of several scouts who were "extremely impressed" with him. He signed a multi-year rookie contract with the Broncos in February 1974. However, the Broncos ended up releasing him before the start of the season, on August 10, 1974.

On September 25, 1974, Wafer signed with the Green Bay Packers. The Packers described him as "extremely quick" and noted that he was able to run a 40-yard dash in 4.9 seconds. He made his NFL debut four days later, in the team's 21–19 win over the Detroit Lions. He appeared in one additional game for the Packers before being released on October 25. He later signed with the New York Giants on November 27, appearing in one game for them. He returned to the team in 1975 but was released before the regular season, on July 18, 1975, ending his professional career. He finished having appeared in three NFL games, all as a backup.
