= Marsh White =

American football player (born 1953)

No. 29, 24
- Position: Running back

Personal information
- Born: April 1, 1953; Bonham, Texas, U.S.
- Died: July 13, 2016 (aged 63); Rowlett, Texas, U.S.
- Listed height: 6 ft 2 in (1.88 m)
- Listed weight: 220 lb (100 kg)

Career information
- High school: Bonham
- College: Arkansas (1971–1974)
- NFL draft: 1975: 12th round, 287th overall pick

Career history
- New York Giants (1975–1977); Detroit Lions (1978)*
- * Offseason or practice squad member only

Career NFL statistics
- Games played: 28
- Rushing yards: 313
- Rushing touchdowns: 2
- Receptions: 5
- Receiving yards: 22
- Stats at Pro Football Reference

Marshall Reginald White (April 1, 1953 – July 13, 2016) was an American former professional football running back who played in the National Football League (NFL) with the New York Giants and Detroit Lions. He played college football for the Arkansas Razorbacks.

== Early life ==
White was born on April 1, 1953, in Bonham, Texas. He attended Bonham High School and played football, earning all-district honors his junior and senior year.

== College career ==
White played college football for the Arkansas Razorbacks from 1971 to 1974. In 1971 he played on the freshman team before he became a three-year letterman from 1972 to 1974. White played in 33 games and rushed for 694 yards and three touchdowns. In addition he had one catch for six yards his senior season. In 1972, White's dorm room was destroyed in a fire during finals week.

== Professional career ==
=== New York Giants ===
White was selected in the tenth round, with the 268th overall selection, by the New York Giants in the 1975 NFL draft. He played 28 games, starting one, recording 313 rushing yards, two touchdowns and five receptions for 22 yards. On September 8, 1977, White was placed on the injured reserve.

=== Detroit Lions ===
On August 1, 1978, White was traded to the Detroit Lions, along with defensive tackle, Dave Gallagher, for two undisclosed draft picks in the 1979 NFL draft. The trade was eventually nullified after he injured his knee during the physical.

== Personal life ==
White is the cousin of Baseball Hall of Famer, Joe Morgan.
