= Al Simpson (American football) =

American football player (born 1951)

No. 79
- Position: Tackle

Personal information
- Born: July 27, 1951 (age 75); Pittsburgh, Pennsylvania, U.S.
- Listed height: 6 ft 5 in (1.96 m)
- Listed weight: 255 lb (116 kg)

Career information
- High school: Wilkinsburg
- College: Colorado State
- NFL draft: 1975: 2nd round, 27th overall pick

Career history
- New York Giants (1975–1976); BC Lions (1977–1978)
- Stats at Pro Football Reference

Allen Ralph Simpson Jr. (born July 27, 1951) is an American former professional football player who was a tackle for the New York Giants of National Football League (NFL). He played college football for the Colorado State University.
