= Ed Marshall =

American football player (born 1947)

No. 83, 89
- Positions: Wide receiver, tight end

Personal information
- Born: September 23, 1947 (age 79); Corpus Christi, Texas, U.S.
- Listed height: 6 ft 4 in (1.93 m)
- Listed weight: 199 lb (90 kg)

Career information
- High school: Roy Miller (Corpus Christi)
- College: Cameron
- NFL draft: 1971: 11th round, 275th overall pick

Career history
- Cincinnati Bengals (1971); Memphis Southmen (1974–1975); Detroit Lions (1976)*; New York Jets (1976); New York Giants (1976–1977)
- * Offseason or practice squad member only

Awards and highlights
- All-WFL (1974)

Career NFL statistics
- Receptions: 17
- Receiving yards: 362
- Receiving touchdowns: 3
- Stats at Pro Football Reference

Ed Marshall (born September 23, 1947) is an American former professional football player who was a wide receiver and tight end in the National Football League (NFL). He played college football for the Cameron Aggies.

== College career ==
Marshall played both football and basketball at Cameron University. He led the Aggies in scoring for as a sophomore, junior and senior and is the school's all-time leading receiver with 113 receptions for 2,448 yards and 29 touchdowns (Cameron discontinued football in 1992). Marshall was inducted into Cameron's Athletic Hall of Fame in 2011.

== Professional career ==
Marshall was selected 275th overall by the Cincinnati Bengals in the 11th round of the 1971 NFL draft. He played one season with the team before being cut the next year. Marshall spent the next two seasons out of football until signing with the Memphis Southmen of the newly-formed World Football League (WFL). In his first season, Marshall caught 60 passes for 1,159 yards and a league-leading 19 touchdowns and was named All-WFL. In 1975 he had 31 receptions for 582 yards and nine touchdowns before the league folded twelve games into the season. Marshall's 28 total touchdowns scored were the most in the league's short history. After the WFL folded Marshall was signed by the Detroit Lions, but was cut at the end of training camp. He was picked up by the New York Jets and played in the team's season opener. The Jets waived Marshall the following week on September 16, 1976. He was signed by the New York Giants on November 1, 1976. Marshall was waived by the Giants after the end of the 1977 season.
