= Bill Singletary =

American football player born in 1951

No. 54
- Position: Linebacker

Personal information
- Born: March 18, 1951 (age 75); Camden, New Jersey, U.S.
- Listed height: 6 ft 2 in (1.88 m)
- Listed weight: 233 lb (106 kg)

Career information
- High school: Woodrow Wilson
- College: Temple
- NFL draft: 1973: 4th round, 97th overall pick

Career history
- San Diego Chargers (1973)*; New England Patriots (1974)*; New York Giants (1974); Philadelphia Bell (1975)
- * Offseason or practice squad member only
- Stats at Pro Football Reference

Williams James Singletary (born March 18, 1951) is an American former professional football player who was a linebacker for the New York Giants of National Football League (NFL). He played college football for the Temple University.

Singletary played both offensive tackle and defensive tackle at Woodrow Wilson High School in Camden, New Jersey. He was an all-South Jersey team while there. Singletary was primarily an offensive guard in college. In 1971 he was named to the UPI all-East college football team. He was named to the UPI All-American 2nd team as a guard for the 1972 season. He was also named to several magazine All-American teams that season.

Even while starring as a guard in college, there were concerns that Singletary was too small to play guard in the NFL. He was drafted 97th overall as a linebacker by the San Diego Chargers in the 4th round of the 1973 NFL draft. He signed with the Chargers in July 1973. He was cut by the Chargers without playing a regular season game. He was signed by the New England Patriots before the 1974 season but was placed on injured reserve prior to the start of the season. The Giants signed him as a free agent in December 1974 and he played 3 games for them during the remainder of the season. He was cut by the Giants during the 1975 preseason. He played for the Philadelphia Bell of the WFL in 1975.

Temple University retired Singletary's number 64 after the 1972 season. He was inducted into Temple's Hall of Fame in 1984.
