= Rondy Colbert =

American football player (born 1954)

No. 35, 26
- Position: Defensive back

Personal information
- Born: January 7, 1954 (age 72); Corsicana, Texas, U.S.
- Listed height: 5 ft 9 in (1.75 m)
- Listed weight: 185 lb (84 kg)

Career information
- High school: Houston (TX) Sterling Aviation
- College: Lamar
- NFL draft: 1975: 17th round, 417th overall pick

Career history
- New York Giants (1975–1976); St. Louis Cardinals (1977)

Career NFL statistics
- Fumble recoveries: 4
- Return yards: 760
- Total TDs: 1
- Stats at Pro Football Reference

Rondy Estes Colbert (born January 7, 1954) is an American former professional football player who was a defensive back in the National Football League (NFL). He played college football for the Lamar Cardinals. He played in the NFL for the New York Giants from 1975 to 1976 and the St. Louis Cardinals in 1977.
