= Bill Windauer =

American football player (born 1949)

- Windauer in 1974

No. 65, 72, 78
- Position: Defensive tackle

Personal information
- Born: November 22, 1949 (age 76); Chicago, Illinois, U.S.
- Listed height: 6 ft 4 in (1.93 m)
- Listed weight: 250 lb (113 kg)

Career information
- High school: Mendel Catholic (Chicago)
- College: Iowa
- NFL draft: 1973: 8th round, 191st overall pick

Career history
- Baltimore Colts (1973–1974); New York Giants (1975); Atlanta Falcons (1976)

Career NFL statistics
- Games played: 18
- Starts: 5
- Stats at Pro Football Reference

Bill Windauer (born November 22, 1949) is an American former professional football player who was a defensive tackle in the National Football League (NFL). He played college football for the Iowa Hawkeyes. Windauer played in the NFL for the Baltimore Colts from 1973 to 1974, the New York Giants in 1975 and the Atlanta Falcons in 1976.
