= Dan Lloyd (American football) =

American football player (born 1953)

No. 54
- Position: Linebacker

Personal information
- Born: November 9, 1953 (age 72); Heber, Utah, U.S.
- Listed height: 6 ft 2 in (1.88 m)
- Listed weight: 225 lb (102 kg)

Career information
- High school: James Lick (San Jose, California)
- College: Washington
- NFL draft: 1976: 6th round, 162nd overall pick

Career history
- New York Giants (1976–1979)

Awards and highlights
- First-team All-Pac-8 (1975); Second-team All-Pac-8 (1973)

Career NFL statistics
- Sacks: 1.5
- Fumble recoveries: 4
- Interceptions: 2
- Stats at Pro Football Reference

Daniel B. Lloyd (born November 9, 1953) is an American former professional football player who was a linebacker for four seasons in the National Football League (NFL) for the New York Giants. He played college football for the Washington Huskies and was selected in the sixth round of the 1976 NFL draft. Lloyd was a California High School Individual Wrestling Champion from James Lick High School - following the path blazed earlier at James Lick by (Heisman Trophy winner) Jim Plunkett.

After four years with the Giants, Lloyd contracted cancer in March 1980 and was pronounced cured in March 1982. He was then in the 1983 training camp of the New Jersey Generals

== See also ==
- Washington Huskies football statistical leaders
