= Steve Crosby =

American football player and coach (born 1950)

No. 33
- Position: Running back

Personal information
- Born: July 3, 1950 (age 76); Great Bend, Kansas, U.S.
- Listed height: 5 ft 11 in (1.80 m)
- Listed weight: 205 lb (93 kg)

Career information
- High school: Pawnee Rock (Great Bend)
- College: Fort Hays State
- NFL draft: 1974: 17th round, 419th overall pick

Career history

Playing
- New York Giants (1974–1976)

Coaching
- Miami Dolphins (1979–1982) Special teams coordinator & linebackers coach; Atlanta Falcons (1983–1984) Running backs coach & quarterbacks coach; Cleveland Browns (1985) Running backs coach; Atlanta Falcons (1986) Quarterbacks coach; Atlanta Falcons (1987–1989) Running backs coach; New England Patriots (1990) Special teams coordinator & tight ends coach; Cleveland Browns (1991–1993) Running backs coach; Cleveland Browns (1994) Offensive coordinator & running backs coach; Cleveland Browns (1995) Offensive coordinator & quarterbacks coach; Vanderbilt (1998–2001) Offensive coordinator & wide receivers coach; San Diego Chargers (2002–2010) Special teams coordinator

Operations
- Miami Dolphins (1977–1978) Scout; Philadelphia Eagles (1996–1997) Scout

Awards and highlights
- NFL Special Teams Coach of the Year (2007)
- Coaching profile at Pro Football Reference
- Stats at Pro Football Reference

Steven Kent Crosby (born July 3, 1950) is an American former professional football coach and player. He spent 33 years in the National Football League (NFL)—3 as a player, 4 as a scout and 26 as a coach. Crosby was named the NFL Special Teams Coach of the Year with the San Diego Chargers in 2007.

A running back, Crosby played college football for the Fort Hays Tigers. He played professionally for the New York Giants (1974–1976). Afterwards he scouted or coached in the NFL for the Miami Dolphins, Atlanta Falcons, Cleveland Browns, New England Patriots and the Philadelphia Eagles. He then coached college football for three years at Vanderbilt University before joining the Chargers in 2002.

== College career ==
Crosby played college football at Fort Hays State, where he received honorable mention on the Associated Press's Little All-American team (1973). He was a two-time National Association of Intercollegiate Athletics (NAIA) All-District 10 (1972–1973) and two-time All-Great Plains Athletic Conference selection (1972–1973). The tailback finished his career with 2,780 rushing yards and 27 touchdowns while also filling in for injured teammates at quarterback and middle linebacker.

== Professional playing career ==
Crosby was selected 419th overall by the New York Giants in the 17th round of the 1974 NFL draft. He was one of the few 17th round picks to ever make an NFL team after reporting to training camp in his best ever physical condition. The 1974 NFL strike also may have helped as veterans missed training camp. Stomach and knee injuries impacted Crosby's first year. He played three seasons with the Giants and retired following the 1976 season after a serious knee injury.

== Coaching career ==
Crosby recovered from his injury and earned his master's degree. Three weeks after accepting a position to teach high school, he was offered to be a scout for the Miami Dolphins. He accepted, and later became a coach under Don Shula. The Dolphins went to Super Bowl XVII in 1982. Crosby then coached for the Atlanta Falcons, Cleveland Browns, New England Patriots and the Philadelphia Eagles. In 1985 with the Browns, Crosby was the running backs coach that oversaw both Earnest Byner and Kevin Mack both running for 1,000 yards.

Crosby joined the Chargers in 2002 as special teams coach under their new incoming head coach, Marty Schottenheimer. Crosby was honored as the 2007 NFL Special Teams Coach of the Year by Professional Kicking Services. His kickoff strategy with the Chargers emphasized placement of the ball—forcing the return team to one side of the field—as a tradeoff for the distance of the kick. During his Chargers tenure, four special team players were selected to the Pro Bowl including covermen Kassim Osgood (3-time selection) and Hanik Milligan, kicker Nate Kaeding (2-times) and long snapper David Binn. Additionally, punter Mike Scifres was a Pro Bowl first-alternate four times, and kick returner Darren Sproles was a first-alternate once and a second alternate twice. Kaeding, who started his NFL career under Crosby, was the NFL's most accurate kicker of all-time as of the end of the 2010 season, converting 86.5% of his field goals attempts.

The San Diego Union-Tribune wrote that Crosby's special teams unit in 2010 was "by some measures the worst special teams season in NFL history." The Chargers allowed touchdowns on three kickoffs and one punt, and had four punts blocked and another deflected. As of 2010, two teams since 1994 had allowed more kickoff returns for touchdowns and five allowed as many as the Chargers. Two teams had allowed more blocked punts, and none since 1976 surrendered a punt return average higher than the Chargers' 18.9 yards. Crosby was unable to get a group of inexperienced players to play at an acceptable level. Some team members said it was time for a change after listening to Crosby for nine years, and his contract was not renewed after the season.
