= Robert Giblin =

American football player (1952–2025)

No. 28
- Position: Defensive back

Personal information
- Born: November 18, 1952; Omaha, Nebraska, U.S.
- Died: February 19, 2025 (aged 72)
- Listed height: 6 ft 2 in (1.88 m)
- Listed weight: 205 lb (93 kg)

Career information
- High school: Port Neches Groves (Port Neches, Texas)
- College: Houston
- NFL draft: 1975: 4th round, 79th overall pick

Career history
- New York Giants (1975); St. Louis Cardinals (1977)

Awards and highlights
- First-team All-American (1974)
- Stats at Pro Football Reference

Robert James Giblin (November 18, 1952 – February 19, 2025) was an American professional football player who was a defensive back in the National Football League (NFL). He played college football for the Houston Cougars. Giblin played in the NFL for the New York Giants in 1975 and for the St. Louis Cardinals in 1977.

Giblin died on February 19, 2025, at the age of 72.
