= Norm Snead =

American football player (1939–2024)

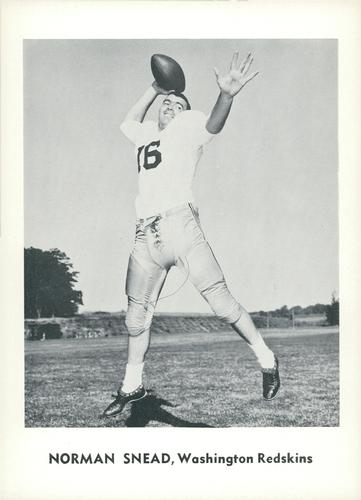
- Snead in 1961

No. 16
- Position: Quarterback

Personal information
- Born: July 31, 1939; Halifax County, Virginia, U.S.
- Died: January 14, 2024 (aged 84); Naples, Florida, U.S.
- Listed height: 6 ft 4 in (1.93 m)
- Listed weight: 215 lb (98 kg)

Career information
- High school: Warwick (Newport News, Virginia)
- College: Wake Forest (1957–1960)
- NFL draft: 1961: 1st round, 2nd overall pick
- AFL draft: 1961: 5th round, 33rd overall pick

Career history
- Washington Redskins (1961–1963); Philadelphia Eagles (1964–1970); Minnesota Vikings (1971); New York Giants (1972–1974); San Francisco 49ers (1974–1975); New York Giants (1976)

Awards and highlights
- 4× Pro Bowl (1962, 1963, 1965, 1972); NFL completion percentage leader (1972); NCAA passing yards leader (1960); 2× First-team All-ACC (1959, 1960); Second-team All-ACC (1958); Wake Forest Demon Deacons Jersey No. 16 retired

Career NFL statistics
- Passing attempts: 4,353
- Passing completions: 2,276
- Completion percentage: 52.3%
- TD–INT: 196–257
- Passing yards: 30,797
- Passer rating: 65.5
- Stats at Pro Football Reference

Norman Bailey Snead (July 31, 1939 – January 14, 2024) was an American professional football player who was a quarterback in the National Football League (NFL). He played for the Washington Redskins, Philadelphia Eagles, Minnesota Vikings, New York Giants, and San Francisco 49ers. He played college football for the Wake Forest Demon Deacons and was the second overall selection of the 1961 NFL draft.

== Early life ==
Snead grew up in Newport News, Virginia, the son of Hugh, a farmer, and Louise Snead. He attended Warwick High School, where he was a three-sport star athlete (basketball, football, and baseball). Snead won all six pitching decisions as a sophomore and junior, and he averaged 23 points in basketball as a senior, scoring 41 in one game. He split time as starting quarterback as a junior, then as a senior he passed for nearly 1,000 yards and 13 touchdowns. In a game against Hampton, Snead threw what would be the game-winning touchdown pass, then intercepted a pass on Hampton's next series to seal the outcome. He was named second-team all-state, and graduated in 1957.

== College career ==
Snead attended Wake Forest University, where he set 15 conference single-game, season and career passing records. His passing statistics with the Demon Deacons included:

- 1958: 67–151 for 1,003 yards.
- 1959: 82–191 for 1,361 yards.
- 1960: 123–259 for 1,676 yards.

In 1958, Snead was named the second-team All-Atlantic Coast Conference quarterback, and in 1959 and 1960 he earned first-team All-ACC honors. In 1960, Snead was named second-team All-American as a quarterback by UPI and the Football Writers Association of America.

In 1984, he was inducted into the Virginia Sports Hall of Fame.

== NFL career ==
Snead was named to the Pro Bowl on four occasions: in 1962, 1963, 1965, and in 1972, during the last of which he led the NFL in completion percentage and was second in passer rating.

Snead was drafted in 1961 by both the National Football League and the American Football League, and Snead elected to join the Redskins, who selected him second overall. Unfortunately, the team was in the middle of a Dark Age, as they had not had a winning season since 1956 nor made the playoffs since 1946. Starting with a new coach in Bill McPeak, Snead would start in each game for 1961, which proved to be a miserable one. Snead had three games with at least three interceptions and the team did not win a game until the season finale against the upstart Dallas Cowboys. Snead threw 11 touchdowns to 22 interceptions for 2,337 yards. He was in the top ten for pass attempts, completions, yards, and interceptions (3rd, 4th, 6th, and 3rd, respectively). Snead would improve slightly for the next season, as he would throw for 2,926 yards with 22 touchdowns and interceptions as he won five games for the Redskins, and it was good enough for a selection to the Pro Bowl. The next season was his last with the Redskins, and it was a miserable one. In a 3–11 season, he threw for 3,043 yards (the first of two 3,000-yard seasons) while throwing 13 touchdowns and 27 interceptions (a league high), but he was nevertheless selected to the Pro Bowl once again. His highlight game in yards came against the Pittsburgh Steelers, as he threw for 424 yards for the only 400-yard game of his career in a 34–28 loss.

Snead was traded along with Claude Crabb from the Redskins to the Philadelphia Eagles for Sonny Jurgensen and Jimmy Carr on 31 March 1964. The transaction was part of a youth movement by recently appointed Eagles head coach and general manager Joe Kuharich, as both Snead and Crabb were age 24 at the time while Jurgensen and Carr were 29 and 31 respectively. In seven seasons with the Eagles, Snead was the primary starter for each season (starting 81 of 98 possible games), although the result would be that Snead was part of another team in a decades-long slump. Snead started the first nine games of his first season with the team before starting one of the final five games. He threw for 1,096 yards while throwing 14 touchdowns to 12 interceptions as the Eagles won six games. The Eagles continued their spin in 1965, as Snead started 10 games and won 4 while throwing 2,346 yards for 15 touchdowns to thirteen interceptions and garnered a Pro Bowl selection.

For 1966, he went 5–5 but the Eagles won four games without him as starter to finish 2nd in their division. It was the first of just three seasons that Snead would play on a team with a winning season. The game against the St. Louis Cardinals was the worst of his career, as he threw a career high five interceptions while going 16-of-45 for 247 yards. He threw 8 touchdowns to 11 interceptions for 1,275 yards (throwing for over 200 yards just once in his starts). In 1967, he returned to start each game and threw 29 touchdowns to 24 interceptions while going for 3,399 yards (a career high) as the team went 6–7–1. However, the next three seasons were a return to misery, as he won just 9 of his 35 starts and was outmatched in interceptions to touchdowns each time. He led the league in interceptions twice during that span. However, Snead was traded away after the 1970 season, going to a growing power in Minnesota, who at that time had just Gary Cuozzo as quarterback. He was traded from the Eagles to the Vikings for Steve Smith, second- and sixth-round selections in 1971 (50th and 154th overall–Hank Allison and Mississippi defensive back Wyck Neely respectively) and a 1972 third-round pick (76th overall–Bobby Majors) on January 28, 1971. He made appearances at quarterback for seven games while starting two of them. While he would throw six interceptions to one touchdown for 470 yards, he ended up winning both of his starts (against the Buffalo Bills and Philadelphia Eagles). Although the Vikings made the playoffs, Cuozzo was the starter for the playoff game against Dallas while Snead was on the sideline. It was the only time Snead was on a playoff roster.

Snead was dealt along with Bob Grim, Vince Clements, a first rounder in 1972 (24th overall–Larry Jacobson) and a second rounder in 1973 (40th overall–Brad Van Pelt) from the Vikings to the Giants for Fran Tarkenton one year later on January 27, 1972; this made him one of few quarterbacks to be part of two trades for eventual Hall of Fame quarterbacks. Snead would start in 13 of 14 games for the Giants in 1972, and it was his last good run. He threw for 2,307 yards while leading the league in completion percentage (60.3%) while throwing 17 touchdowns to 12 interceptions, the first time he had more touchdowns than interceptions since 1967. The Giants went 8–6 after losing two of their last three games. It proved to be a mirage for the Giants, since the team went 1–5–1 with Snead as starter the following year. He led the league in interceptions with 22 while throwing for 1,483 yards. He would start four games for the Giants the following year before being traded to San Francisco, where he made one start. The trade on October 22, 1974, began a chain reaction of quarterback trades, where Snead was sent from the Giants to the San Francisco 49ers for a third rounder in 1975 (62nd overall–Danny Buggs) and a fourth rounder in 1976 (104th overall–Gordon Bell). He dislodged Joe Reed who went from the 49ers to the Detroit Lions and was replaced by Craig Morton who was acquired by the Giants from the Dallas Cowboys.

In 1975, he started seven games for the 49ers. Going 2–5, he threw 1,337 yards for nine touchdowns to ten interceptions. After being cut by the 49ers in the 1976 preseason, he re-signed with the Giants to replace the injured Jerry Golsteyn as Morton's backup on September 1, and he would make two starts. Snead would take part in one of the strangest wins ever for a quarterback. The winless Giants (0–8) faced 6–3 Washington on November 14, and the two teams combined for just 179 yards of passing to go with seven turnovers. Snead went 3-of-14 for two interceptions and 26 yards for a passer rating of 0, but Joe Danelo broke the tie with his 50-yard field goal in the fourth quarter to win the game 12–9. Snead was the last quarterback to win a game with a passer rating of zero. It was also his last appearance in the NFL.

Snead was the first quarterback to have lost 100 games as a starter. Since then, only seven other quarterbacks (including three Hall of Famers) have lost as many games. Snead appeared or started in 178 games and threw at least one interception in 131 of them.

== NFL career statistics ==
Legend
	Led the league
**Bold**	Career high

Year	Team	Games			Passing									Rushing					Sacks	
Year	Team	GP	GS	Record	Cmp	Att	Pct	Yds	Y/A	Lng	TD	Int	Rtg	Att	Yds	Avg	Lng	TD	Sck	Yds
1961	WAS	14	14	1–12–1	172	375	45.9	2,337	6.2	80	11	22	51.6	**34**	47	1.4	9	**3**	**49**	**368**
1962	WAS	14	14	5–7–2	184	354	52.0	2,926	8.3	85	22	22	74.7	20	10	0.5	9	**3**	31	240
1963	WAS	14	14	3–11	175	363	48.2	3,043	**8.4**	77	13	**27**	58.1	23	**100**	4.3	16	2	37	337
1964	PHI	12	10	4–6	138	283	48.8	1,906	6.7	87	14	12	69.6	16	59	3.7	19	2	20	160
1965	PHI	11	10	4–6	150	288	52.1	2,346	8.1	78	15	13	78.0	24	81	3.4	20	**3**	26	191
1966	PHI	10	10	5–5	103	226	45.6	1,275	5.6	48	8	11	55.1	15	32	2.1	17	1	25	190
1967	PHI	14	14	6–7–1	**240**	**434**	55.3	**3,399**	7.8	87	**29**	24	80.0	9	30	3.3	21	2	48	351
1968	PHI	11	11	2–9	152	291	52.2	1,655	5.7	55	11	21	51.8	9	27	3.0	9	0	20	154
1969	PHI	13	13	4–8–1	190	379	50.1	2,768	7.3	80	19	23	65.7	8	2	0.3	5	2	21	170
1970	PHI	14	13	3–9–1	181	335	54.0	2,323	6.9	79	15	20	66.1	18	35	1.9	16	**3**	21	181
1971	MIN	7	2	2–0	37	75	49.3	470	6.3	55	1	6	40.4	6	6	1.0	5	1	7	67
1972	NYG	14	13	8–5	196	325	60.3	2,307	7.1	**94**	17	12	84.0	10	21	2.1	15	0	8	66
1973	NYG	10	7	1–5–1	131	235	55.7	1,483	6.3	46	7	22	45.8	4	13	3.3	14	0	9	67
1974	NYG	5	4	1–3	67	111	60.4	615	5.5	53	3	7	58.2	3	4	1.3	3	0	5	42
1974	SFO	3	1	0–1	30	48	**62.5**	368	7.7	39	2	1	**91.3**	1	25	**25.0**	**25**	0	2	15
1975	SFO	9	7	2–5	108	189	57.1	1,337	7.1	60	9	10	73.0	9	30	3.3	10	1	16	109
1976	NYG	3	2	1–1	22	42	52.4	239	5.7	31	0	4	29.9	3	−1	−0.3	0	0	5	27
Career		178	159	52–100–7	2,276	4,353	52.3	30,797	7.1	94	196	257	65.5	212	521	2.5	25	23	350	2,735

== Coaching career ==
Snead retired from playing in 1977 and was hired as the head football coach at The Apprentice School in Newport News, Virginia. He served two stints as head football coach, from 1977 to 1984 and 1988 to 1989, compiling a record of 46–41–2.

== Death ==
Snead died at age 84 in Naples, Florida, on January 14, 2024.
