= Bob Schmit =

American football player (born 1950)

No. 59, 51
- Position: Linebacker

Personal information
- Born: June 28, 1950 (age 76); New York, New York, U.S.
- Listed height: 6 ft 1 in (1.85 m)
- Listed weight: 220 lb (100 kg)

Career information
- High school: Boys Town (Boys Town, Nebraska)
- College: Nebraska (1970–1973)
- NFL draft: 1974: undrafted

Career history
- Portland Storm (1974); New York Giants (1975–1976)
- Stats at Pro Football Reference

Robert Steven Schmit (born June 28, 1950) is an American former professional football player who was a linebacker for the New York Giants of National Football League (NFL). He played college football for the Nebraska Cornhuskers.
