= Larry Watkins =

American football player (born 1946)

No. 30, 34, 38, 36
- Position: Running back

Personal information
- Born: October 5, 1946 (age 80); Bessemer, Alabama, U.S.
- Listed height: 6 ft 2 in (1.88 m)
- Listed weight: 230 lb (104 kg)

Career information
- High school: Jackson S. Abrams (Bessemer)
- College: Alcorn State (1965-1968)
- NFL draft: 1969: undrafted

Career history
- Detroit Lions (1969); Philadelphia Eagles (1970–1972); Buffalo Bills (1973–1974); New York Giants (1975–1977)

Career NFL statistics
- Rushing yards: 1,711
- Rushing average: 3.8
- Receptions: 51
- Receiving yards: 284
- Total touchdowns: 13
- Stats at Pro Football Reference

Lawrence Watkins (born October 5, 1946, in Bessemer, Alabama) is an American former professional football player who was a running back in the National Football League (NFL) for the Detroit Lions, Philadelphia Eagles, Buffalo Bills, and the New York Giants. He played college football for the Alcorn State Braves.

== Early professional career ==
After college, Watkins was signed as a free agent by the Detroit Lions in 1969. In 1970, the Lions traded him to the Philadelphia Eagles, where he served as a reserve for three years.

== Buffalo Bills ==
In 1973, Watkins started the first nine games of the season at fullback for the Bills. In that role, he extensively blocked for O. J. Simpson, who put up 2,003 yards, a season rushing record. After the first nine games, Watkins was demoted in favor of Jim Braxton. Overall, Watkins finished 1973 with 414 yards gained across 98 carries and two touchdowns.

In 1974, Watkins injured his ankle in the final pre-season exhibition game. As a result, he received only limited playing time in the regular season. The Bills then traded him to the Giants in exchange for a draft pick.

== New York Giants ==
Watkins played for the Giants from 1975 through 1977. The New York Times called him a "steady capable reserve" in 1975 and 1976. The Giants waived him in late September 1977. The team needed space on its roster to pick up an additional defensive end after George Martin was injured in the first game of the season. However, in October 1977 Watkins returned to the team.

== Personal life ==
As of October 1977, Watkins lived in Mt. Laurel, NJ with his wife and two children. Outside of football, he worked as a schoolteacher.
