= Andy Selfridge =

American football player (1949–2019)

No. 64, 57, 51
- Position: Linebacker

Personal information
- Born: January 12, 1949; Cleveland, Ohio, U.S.
- Died: June 28, 2019 (aged 70); Charlottesville, Virginia, U.S.
- Listed height: 6 ft 3 in (1.91 m)
- Listed weight: 218 lb (99 kg)

Career information
- High school: Gilmour Academy (OH)
- College: Virginia
- NFL draft: 1972: 13th round, 321st overall pick

Career history
- Buffalo Bills (1972); New York Giants (1974–1975); Miami Dolphins (1976); New York Giants (1977)

Awards and highlights
- First-team All-ACC (1971)

Career NFL statistics
- Sacks: 1
- Fumble recoveries: 2
- Interceptions: 1
- Stats at Pro Football Reference

Andrew Paul Selfridge (January 12, 1949 – June 28, 2019) was an American professional football linebacker in the National Football League (NFL) for the Buffalo Bills, New York Giants, and the Miami Dolphins. He played college football at the University of Virginia and was drafted in the 13th round of the 1972 NFL draft by the San Diego Chargers.

== Biography ==
After his football career, Selfridge worked in fundraising at the University of Virginia. He died on June 28, 2019, in Charlottesville, Virginia at the age of 70.
