= Hunter Enis =

American football player (born 1936)

No. 14, 17
- Position: Quarterback

Personal information
- Born: December 10, 1936 (age 89); Fort Worth, Texas, U.S.

Career information
- College: TCU
- NFL draft: 1960: undrafted

Career history
- Dallas Texans (1960); San Diego Chargers (1961); Oakland Raiders (1962); Denver Broncos (1962)

Career NFL statistics
- Passing attempts: 160
- Passing completions: 80
- Completion percentage: 50.0%
- TD–INT: 4–6
- Passing yards: 947
- Passer rating: 61.1
- Stats at Pro Football Reference

George Hunter Enis (born December 10, 1936) is a former American collegiate and Professional Football quarterback who played for three seasons in the American Football League (AFL). He played for the Dallas Texans in 1960, the San Diego Chargers in 1961, and the Oakland Raiders and the Denver Broncos in 1962. He played college football at Texas Christian University, and currently serves on their board of trustees.

== See also ==
- Other American Football League players
