= Carl Summerell =

American football player (born 1951)

No. 19
- Position: Quarterback

Personal information
- Born: December 6, 1951 (age 74); Virginia Beach, Virginia, U.S.
- Listed height: 6 ft 4 in (1.93 m)
- Listed weight: 208 lb (94 kg)

Career information
- High school: Floyd E. Kellam (VA)
- College: East Carolina
- NFL draft: 1974: 4th round, 80th overall pick

Career history
- New York Giants (1974–1975)

Awards and highlights
- SoCon Player of the Year (1973); 2× First-team All-SoCon (1972, 1973)

Career NFL statistics
- TD–INT: 0-5
- Passing yards: 157
- Passer rating: 22.4
- Stats at Pro Football Reference

Carl Leigh Summerell (born December 6, 1951) is an American former professional football player who was a quarterback for the New York Giants of the National Football League (NFL). He played college football for the East Carolina Pirates.

He is in East Carolina's athletic Hall of Fame.
