= Bobby Brooks (defensive back) =

American football player (born 1951)

No. 37
- Position: Cornerback

Personal information
- Born: February 24, 1951 (age 75); Dallas, Texas, U.S.
- Listed height: 6 ft 1 in (1.85 m)
- Listed weight: 195 lb (88 kg)

Career information
- High school: I.M. Terrell (Fort Worth, Texas)
- College: Bishop (1970–1973)
- NFL draft: 1974: 11th round, 263rd overall pick

Career history
- New York Giants (1974–1976); Denver Broncos (1978)*
- * Offseason or practice squad member only

Career NFL statistics
- Interceptions: 5
- Fumble recoveries: 2
- Return yards: 115
- Stats at Pro Football Reference

Bobby Daniel Brooks (born February 24, 1951) is an American former professional football player who was a cornerback for three seasons with the New York Giants of the National Football League (NFL). He was selected by the Giants in the 11th round of the 1974 NFL draft after playing college football for the Bishop Tigers.

== Early life and college ==
Bobby Daniel Brooks was born on February 24, 1951, in Dallas, Texas. He attended I.M. Terrell High School in Fort Worth, Texas.

He played college football for the Tigers of Bishop College from 1970 to 1973.

== Professional career ==
Brooks was selected by the New York Giants in the 11th round, with the 263rd overall pick, of the 1974 NFL draft, and by the Memphis Southmen in the 21st round, with the 244th overall pick, of the 1974 WFL draft. He signed with the Giants in 1974. Brooks played in all 14 games for the Giants during the 1974 season, returning five kicks for 106 yards and one punt for nine yards. He started all 14 games at left cornerback the following year in 1975, recording four interceptions and one fumble recovery, as the Giants finished the season with a 5–9 record. He appeared in four games, all starts, during the 1976 season, totaling one interception and one fumble recovery. He was released by the Giants on September 14, 1977.

Brooks signed with the Denver Broncos on July 17, 1978. He was released on August 1, 1978.
