= Henry Stuckey =

American football player (born 1950)

No. 48
- Position: Defensive back

Personal information
- Born: August 24, 1950 (age 76); Oakland, California, U.S.
- Listed height: 6 ft 1 in (1.85 m)
- Listed weight: 180 lb (82 kg)

Career information
- High school: College Prep (Oakland)
- College: Missouri
- NFL draft: 1972: 8th round, 197th overall pick

Career history
- Miami Dolphins (1972–1974); New York Giants (1975–1976)

Awards and highlights
- 2× Super Bowl champion (VII, VIII)
- Stats at Pro Football Reference

Henry Lee Stuckey (born August 24, 1950) is an American former professional football player who was a defensive back in the National Football League (NFL). He played college football for the Missouri Tigers.

== Career ==
Stuckey played two seasons with the New York Giants (1975–1976), after three seasons with the Miami Dolphins (1972–1974), where he was part of the team that won Super Bowl VIII. An eighth-round selection in the 1972 NFL draft, he did not play his first year with the Dolphins, but then had to replace an injured Lloyd Mumphord in 1973. Stuckey replaced Mumphord in Super Bowl Vll on special teams. He recorded his first NFL tackle when he tackled Washington Redskins kick returner Herb Mul-Key during the start of the second half kick-off. Although the NFL does not recognize it the video clearly shows the special teams tackle.

== Other activities ==
Stuckey reunited with one of his close teammates, Charlie Leigh, in 2002 to do a player day at Shoreline Memorial Hospital, where the teammates walked through the entire hospital and signed autographs for staff and patients. Henry is also credited in helping raise funds for The Dan Marino Foundation.
