= Rick Dvorak =

American football player (born 1952)

No. 66, 75
- Positions: Defensive end, defensive tackle

Personal information
- Born: April 21, 1952 (age 74); Spearville, Kansas, U.S.
- Listed height: 6 ft 4 in (1.93 m)
- Listed weight: 240 lb (109 kg)

Career information
- High school: Spearville
- College: Wichita State (1970–1973)
- NFL draft: 1974: 3rd round, 55th overall pick

Career history
- New York Giants (1974–1977); Miami Dolphins (1977)

Awards and highlights
- MVC Defensive Player of the Year (1972)
- Stats at Pro Football Reference

Richard Joseph Dvorak (born April 21, 1952) is an American former professional football player who was a defensive end for four seasons in the National Football League (NFL) with the New York Giants and Miami Dolphins. He was selected by the Giants in the third round of the 1974 NFL draft after playing college football for the Wichita State Shockers.

== Early life and college ==
Richard Joseph Dvorak was born on April 21, 1952, in Spearville, Kansas. He attended Spearville High School in Spearville.

Dvorak played college football for the Shockers of Wichita State University from 1970 to 1973 and totaled over 400 tackles. He earned Missouri Valley Conference Defensive Player of the Year honors in 1972 and Associated Press honorable mention All-American honors in 1973. He set a school record with 27 unassisted tackles in a game. Dvorak was inducted into the school's athletics hall of fame in 1981.

== Professional career ==
Dvorak was selected by the New York Giants in the third round, with the 55th overall pick, of the 1974 NFL draft. He officially signed with the team on April 22, 1974. He played in 13 games for the Giants during the 1974 season. Dvorak appeared in all 14 games, starting nine, in 1975 and recorded three sacks. He played in all 14 games for the second straight season in 1976. He was released by the Giants on September 14, 1977, re-signed on September 21, and released again on November 9, 1977. Overall, he played in five games for the Giants during the 1977 season.

Dvorak signed with the Miami Dolphins on December 6, 1977, and appeared in one game for the Dolphins that year. He was released on August 23, 1978.
