= Karl Chandler (American football) =

American football player (born 1952)

No. 61, 66
- Position: Guard

Personal information
- Born: February 15, 1952 (age 74); Delaware County, Pennsylvania, U.S.
- Listed height: 6 ft 5 in (1.96 m)
- Listed weight: 245 lb (111 kg)

Career information
- High school: Marple Newtown
- College: Princeton
- NFL draft: 1974: undrafted

Career history
- New York Giants (1974–1977); Detroit Lions (1978–1979)

Career NFL statistics
- Games played: 66
- Games started: 30
- Stats at Pro Football Reference

Karl Chandler is an American former professional football player who was a guard for six seasons with the New York Giants and Detroit Lions of the National Football League (NFL). He played college football for the Princeton Tigers.
