= Ted Plumb =

American football player and coach (born 1939)

Profile
- Position: Tight end

Personal information
- Born: August 20, 1939 (age 87); Reno, Nevada, U.S.

Career information
- College: Baylor

Career history

Coaching
- New York Giants (1974−1975) Offensive backs coach; New York Giants (1976) Receivers coach; Atlanta Falcons (1977−1979) Wide receivers coach & quarterbacks coach; Chicago Bears (1980−1985) Offensive specialist; Philadelphia Eagles (1986−1989) Assistant head coach & offense; Phoenix Cardinals (1990−1992) Receivers coach; Phoenix Cardinals (1993) Tight ends coach; Arizona Cardinals (1994−1995) Receivers coach & tight ends coach; Chicago Bears (1996−1997) Receivers coach & tight ends coach

Operations
- St. Louis Rams (1998–1999) Scout; Carolina Panthers (2000) Pro Scout

Awards and highlights
- 2× Super Bowl champion (XX, XXXIV)
- Coaching profile at Pro Football Reference

Thomas E. "Ted" Plumb (born August 20, 1939) is an American former football player and coach. His playing career ended after a neck injury in training camp as he looked like a promising young receiver for the Buffalo Bills out of Baylor University. Plumb served as the wide receivers coach with the "Monsters of the Midway" Chicago Bears, and he served as the director of pro scouting for "The Greatest Show on Turf" St. Louis Rams. Plumb retired after the 2000 season to his home in Alba, Texas.

== Early life and marriage ==
Plumb was recruited out of Mt. Diablo High School to play at Baylor University as a wide receiver for the Bears. He made the trek from San Francisco, California to Waco, Texas before he realized that Baylor had made a coaching change, and his scholarship was no longer honored. Plumb told his new head coach that he belonged on the team, and was offered a chance to tryout that summer before his freshman year. Plumb worked in the cafeteria and practiced with the team until he eventually earned a scholarship, a starting spot, and was eventually selected in the NFL draft by the Buffalo Bills in 1962 (Chicago Tribune, 1986). Ted Plumb met his wife Marianna while attending Baylor.

Plumb and his wife, Marianna, raised three children as he coached around the country. His oldest child, Loyal Plumb, was born in 1962. His second son, John Plumb (born in 1963) currently resides in Green Bay, Wisconsin. Plumb youngest child, Molly Plumb/Smith (born in 1969) lives in Dallas and serves as a teacher at Chase's Place, a school for children with special needs.

== Coaching career ==
After suffering his injury in training camp with the Buffalo Bills in 1962, Plumb started his coaching career with five years in the high school and junior college ranks before joining the Texas Christian staff in 1968. He also coached at Tulsa (1971) and Kansas (1972–73). From Kansas, Plumb received a call from the New York Giants and soon accepted a job as an offensive backfield Coach (including TE & Rec) in 1974 beginning a long and successful coaching career in the NFL.

After three years with the Giants, Plumb joined the Atlanta Falcons as a quarterback/receiver coach in 1977. He served 3 more years in Atlanta before joining the Chicago Bears coaching staff in 1980.

Plumb was an offensive specialist for the Chicago Bears from 1980 to 1985, helping coordinate the offense and coach the receivers. He was part of the staff when the Bears won Super Bowl XX in 1985.

When Bears defensive coordinator Buddy Ryan was hired as the head coach of the Philadelphia Eagles the following season, Plumb was brought along as the team's offensive coordinator. On November 30, 1988, Plumb was forced to administer the Heimlich maneuver to Ryan, after part of a pork-chop bone was caught in his throat during a meal at the press dining facility at Veterans Stadium, helping him to avoid a serious injury. After the 1989 season, which saw the Eagles lose in the first round of the playoffs, Plumb urged head coach Buddy Ryan to hire New York Jets offensive coordinator Rich Kotite as quarterbacks coach for the Eagles. The Eagles' previous assistant head coach, Doug Scovil, died from a heart attack shortly before week 14 in 1989. Plumb and Kotite had been friends since 1977, and Plumb was a candidate for the vacant Jets head coaching position before Bruce Coslet was given the job.

Instead, Ryan hired Kotite as offensive coordinator on February 6, 1990, to replace Plumb. Plumb was originally going to stay with the Eagles as a receivers coach, but instead became a receivers coach for the Phoenix Cardinals. Plumb coached with the Cardinals for 5 years before accepting a job with his previous team the Chicago Bears in 1996.

In 1998, Plumb accepted a job as a scout with the St. Louis Rams, helping to bring part of the talent to what became "The Greatest Show on Turf". In 2000, he was hired as a pro scout by the Carolina Panthers.
