= Don Clune =

American football player (born 1952)

No. 88
- Position: Wide receiver

Personal information
- Born: July 31, 1952 (age 74); Havertown, Pennsylvania, U.S.
- Listed height: 6 ft 3 in (1.91 m)
- Listed weight: 195 lb (88 kg)

Career information
- High school: Cardinal O'Hara (Springfield, Pennsylvania)
- College: Penn
- NFL draft: 1974: 5th round, 107th overall pick

Career history
- New York Giants (1974–1975); Seattle Seahawks (1976)

Awards and highlights
- First-team All-East (1971); Second-team All-East (1973)

Career NFL statistics
- Receptions: 9
- Receiving yards: 164
- Stats at Pro Football Reference

Donald Andrew Clune (born July 31, 1952) is an American former professional football player who was a wide receiver in the National Football League (NFL). He played college football at the University of Pennsylvania where he earned All-American honors in both football and track. He was selected in the fifth round by the New York Giants in the 1974 NFL draft. Clune played three seasons in the NFL with the Giants and the Seattle Seahawks. He graduated from Cardinal O'Hara High School.
