= Jim Pietrzak =

American football player (born 1953)

No. 76, 62
- Positions: Center, offensive tackle, defensive tackle

Personal information
- Born: February 21, 1953; Hamtramck, Michigan, U.S.
- Died: April 5, 2018 (aged 65); Raleigh, North Carolina, U.S.
- Listed height: 6 ft 5 in (1.96 m)
- Listed weight: 260 lb (118 kg)

Career information
- High school: University of Detroit Jesuit (MI)
- College: Eastern Michigan
- NFL draft: 1974: 6th round, 132nd overall pick

Career history
- New York Giants (1974–1979); New Orleans Saints (1979-1984); Kansas City Chiefs (1987)

Career NFL statistics
- Sacks: 2
- Fumble recoveries: 3
- Stats at Pro Football Reference

James Michael Pietrzak (February 21, 1953 – April 5, 2018) was an American professional football offensive lineman in the National Football League (NFL) for the New York Giants, New Orleans Saints, and the Kansas City Chiefs. He played college football at Eastern Michigan University and was drafted in the sixth round of the 1974 NFL draft. He played 140 games over 11 seasons from 1974 to 1987.
