= Clyde Powers =

American football player (born 1951)

No. 39, 29
- Position: Safety

Personal information
- Born: August 19, 1951 (age 75); Pascagoula, Mississippi, U.S.
- Listed height: 6 ft 1 in (1.85 m)
- Listed weight: 195 lb (88 kg)

Career information
- High school: Lawton (OK)
- College: Oklahoma
- NFL draft: 1974: 5th round, 119th overall pick

Career history
- New York Giants (1974–1977); Kansas City Chiefs (1978)

Awards and highlights
- Second-team All-Big Eight (1973)

Career NFL statistics
- Interceptions: 5
- INT yards: 12
- Fumble recoveries: 3
- Stats at Pro Football Reference

Clyde Joseph Powers (born August 19, 1951) is an American former professional football player who was a safety in the National Football League (NFL). He was selected by the New York Giants in the fifth round of the 1974 NFL draft. He played college football for the Oklahoma Sooners.

Powers also played for the Kansas City Chiefs.
