= Willie Young (offensive tackle, born 1943) =

American football player (1943–2020)

No. 69, 65
- Position: Offensive tackle

Personal information
- Born: June 27, 1943; Ruston, Louisiana, U.S.
- Died: July 26, 2020 (aged 77); Louisiana, U.S.
- Listed height: 6 ft 0 in (1.83 m)
- Listed weight: 265 lb (120 kg)

Career information
- High school: Lincoln (Ruston)
- College: Grambling State (1962-1965)
- NFL draft: 1965: undrafted

Career history
- New York Giants (1966–1975)

Awards and highlights
- First-team Little All-American (1965)

Career NFL statistics
- Games played: 135
- Games started: 119
- Receptions: 2
- Receiving yards: 3
- Stats at Pro Football Reference

William Joseph Lull Young (June 27, 1943 – July 26, 2020) was an American professional football player who was an offensive tackle for ten seasons in the National Football League (NFL) for the New York Giants. He played college football at Grambling State University.

Young signed with the Giants as a free agent in 1965 and stayed with the team throughout his career. He played ten seasons, appearing in 135 games, mostly at left tackle, and starting 119 of those.

Young died on July 26, 2020.

His son, Rodney Young, also played in the NFL for the Giants.
