= Jim Stienke =

American football player (born 1950)

No. 20
- Position: Defensive back

Personal information
- Born: November 7, 1950 (age 75); Houston, Texas, U.S.
- Listed height: 5 ft 11 in (1.80 m)
- Listed weight: 182 lb (83 kg)

Career information
- High school: Johnson City (TX) Lyndon B. Johnson
- College: Texas State
- NFL draft: 1973: 2nd round, 47th overall pick

Career history
- Cleveland Browns (1973); New York Giants (1974–1977); Atlanta Falcons (1978)

Career NFL statistics
- Interceptions: 4
- Stats at Pro Football Reference

James Lee Stienke (born November 7, 1950) is an American former professional football player who was a defensive back in the National Football League (NFL). He played college football for the Texas State Bobcats and was selected by the Cleveland Browns in the second round of the 1973 NFL draft. He also played for the New York Giants and Atlanta Falcons.
