= Allan Webb (American football) =

American football player, coach, and executive (1931–2011)

No. 21
- Positions: Defensive back, halfback

Personal information
- Born: January 22, 1931; Washington, D.C.
- Died: July 18, 2011 (aged 78); Burlingame, California
- Listed height: 5 ft 11 in (1.80 m)
- Listed weight: 180 lb (82 kg)

Career information
- High school: Ansonia (Ansonia, Connecticut)
- College: Arnold

Career history

Playing
- New York Giants (1961–1965)

Coaching
- New York Giants (1974–1979) (assistant)

Operations
- New York Giants (1972–1973) (scout); Cleveland Browns (1979–1982) (director of pro personnel); San Francisco 49ers (1983–1995) (pro personnel department)
- Stats at Pro Football Reference

Allan R. Webb (January 22, 1931 – July 18, 2011) was an American football player, coach, and executive. He played professional football in the National Football League (NFL) for the New York Giants from 1961 to 1965 as a defensive back and halfback. Webb played college football at Arnold College.

== Early life ==
Webb was born in Washington, D.C. and attended Ansonia High School in Ansonia, Connecticut. He led the state of Connecticut in 1947 with 21 touchdowns and 21 extra points and earned all-state honors. He then attended Arnold College in Milford, Connecticut, where he played college football.

== Professional playing career ==
Webb began his professional football career with the Montreal Alouettes of the Canadian Football League (CFL). He later played in the NFL for the New York Giants from 1961 to 1965. He appeared in 48 NFL games. He intercepted seven passes.

== Coaching and executive career ==
After retiring as a player, Webb went into coaching, serving has head coach for the Long Island Bulls of the Atlantic Coast Football League (ACFL). He rejoined the New York Giants as a scout in 1972 and was an assistant coach for the team from 1974 to 1978. Webb was the director of pro personnel for the Cleveland Browns from 1979 to 1982 and work in the pro personnel department for the San Francisco 49ers from 1983 until his retirement in 1995. He died on July 18, 2011, at the age of 80, from heart failure.
