= Tom Mullen (American football) =

American football player (born 1951)

No. 73, 65
- Position: Guard / Tackle

Personal information
- Born: November 11, 1951 (age 74); St. Louis, Missouri, U.S.
- Listed height: 6 ft 3 in (1.91 m)
- Listed weight: 248 lb (112 kg)

Career information
- High school: St. John Vianney (Kirkwood, Missouri)
- College: Southwest Missouri State (1970–1973)
- NFL draft: 1974: 2nd round, 28th overall pick

Career history
- New York Giants (1974–1977); St. Louis Cardinals (1978)

Awards and highlights
- PFWA All-Rookie Team (1974); 2× First-team All-MIAA (1972, 1973)
- Stats at Pro Football Reference

Thomas Patrick Mullen (born November 11, 1951) is an American former professional football player who was an offensive lineman for five seasons in the National Football League (NFL) with the New York Giants and St. Louis Cardinals. He was selected by the Giants in the second round of the 1974 NFL draft after playing college football at Southwest Missouri State University.

== Early life and college ==
Thomas Patrick Mullen was born on November 11, 1951, in St. Louis, Missouri. He attended St. John Vianney High School in Kirkwood, Missouri.

Mullen was a four-year starter and four-year letterman for the Southwest Missouri State Bears of Southwest Missouri State University from 1970 to 1973. He earned honorable mention All-Missouri Intercollegiate Athletic Association (MIAA) honors in 1971. He was named unanimous first-team All-MIAA at offensive tackle in both 1972 and 1973. Mullen also garnered Associated Press honorable mention All-American recognition in 1972 and 1973. He played defensive line as well during his senior year. He was selected to play in the Chicago Charities College All-Star Game in 1974 but the game was cancelled due to the 1974 NFL strike. Mullen was inducted into Southwest Missouri State's athletics hall of fame on November 19, 1983.

== Professional career ==
Mullen was selected by the New York Giants in the second round, with the 28th overall pick, of the 1974 NFL draft. He signed with the team on February 13, 1974. He played in 11 games, all starts, for the Giants during his rookie year in 1974 and recovered two fumbles. Mullen was named to the PFWA All-Rookie Team. He appeared in 12 games, starting 11 for the second consecutive year, during the 1975 season. He played in 12 games for the second straight season, all starts, for New York in 1976. He appeared in eight games, starting three, in 1977 before being placed on injured reserve on November 18, 1977. On August 16, 1978, it was reported that he had retired. He had suffered a number of injuries during his time with the Giants. In October, Mullen, who had been seen around the Giants' locker room for several weeks told the media "I'm healthy and I want to play." The Giants then had to place Mullen on irrevocable waivers on October 26 in order to sign him again. However, he was claimed by the St. Louis Cardinals. Upon joining the Cardinals, Mullen said he retired from football because he was tired of the New York area. He played in seven games for the Cardinals during the 1978 season. He voluntarily left Cardinals camp on August 5, 1979, and was then released.
