= John Mendenhall (American football) =

American football player (1948–2021)

No. 64
- Position: Defensive tackle

Personal information
- Born: December 3, 1948; Cullen, Louisiana, U.S.
- Died: February 26, 2021 (aged 72); Cullen, Louisiana, U.S.
- Listed height: 6 ft 1 in (1.85 m)
- Listed weight: 255 lb (116 kg)

Career information
- College: Grambling State
- NFL draft: 1972: 3rd round, 55th overall pick

Career history
- New York Giants (1972–1979); Detroit Lions (1980)

Awards and highlights
- 77th greatest New York Giant of all-time; First-team Little All-American (1971)

Career NFL statistics
- Sacks: 45
- Fumble recoveries: 6
- Interceptions: 1
- Stats at Pro Football Reference

John Rufus Mendenhall (December 3, 1948 – February 26, 2021) was an American professional football defensive tackle in the National Football League (NFL) for the New York Giants and Detroit Lions. He played college football at Grambling State University and was selected in the third round of the 1972 NFL draft.

Mendenhall played in 116 games over the course of 9 seasons between 1972 and 1980. He had his best year as a pro in 1977, when he recorded 12 sacks and 7 forced fumbles.

He died on February 26, 2021, at age 72 in Cullen, Louisiana.
