= 1974 Minnesota Vikings season =

NFL team season

- Head coach: Bud Grant
- Home stadium: Metropolitan Stadium

Results
- Record: 10–4
- Division place: 1st NFC Central
- Playoffs: Won Divisional Playoffs (vs. Cardinals) 30–14; Won NFC Championship (vs. Rams) 14–10; Lost Super Bowl IX (vs. Steelers) 6–16
- All-Pros: DT Alan Page (1st team); T Ron Yary (1st team); FB Chuck Foreman (2nd team)
- Pro Bowlers: DE Carl Eller; FB Chuck Foreman; WR John Gilliam; S Paul Krause; DT Alan Page; QB Fran Tarkenton; T Ron Yary

Uniform
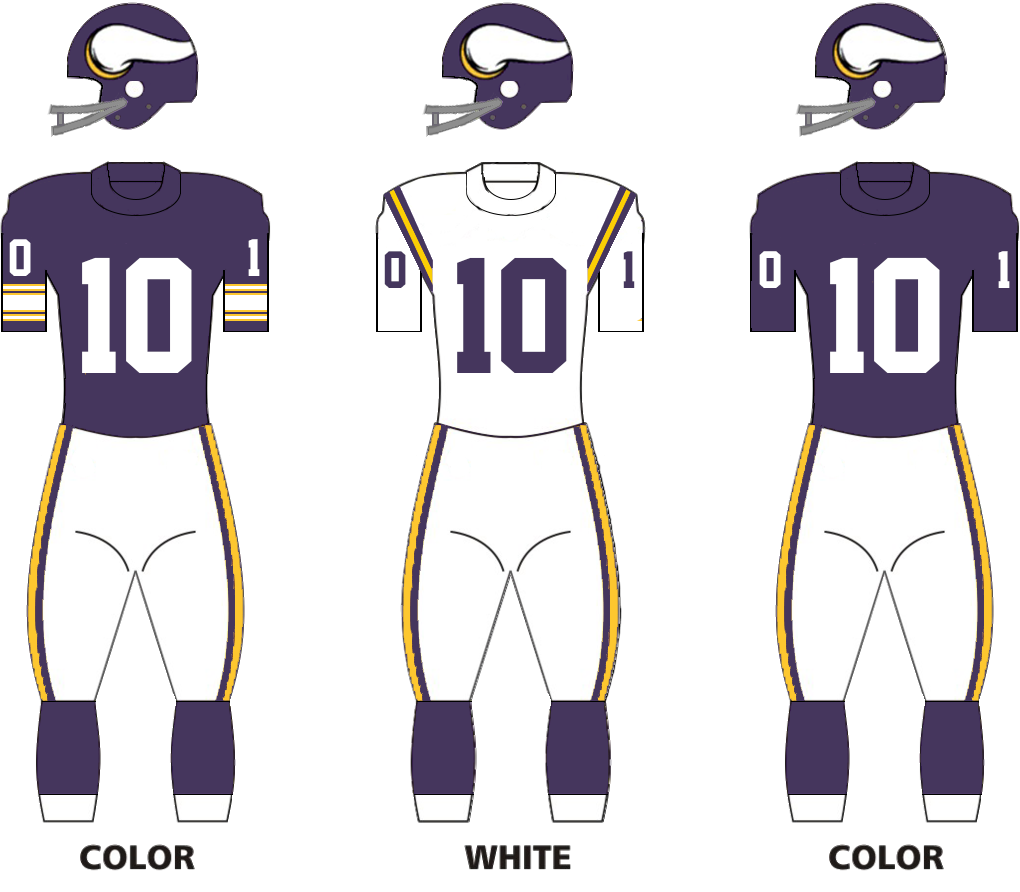

The 1974 season was the Minnesota Vikings' 14th in the National Football League (NFL). They won the NFC Central with a 10–4 record, before defeating the St. Louis Cardinals 30–14 in the NFC divisional playoff game, followed by a 14–10 win over the Los Angeles Rams to claim their second consecutive NFC championship. The Vikings then lost 16–6 to the Pittsburgh Steelers in Super Bowl IX at Tulane Stadium in New Orleans, Louisiana, becoming the first team to lose consecutive Super Bowls.

== Offseason ==
=== 1974 draft ===
Pro Bowler

1974 Minnesota Vikings Draft
Draft order		Player name	Position	College	Notes
Round	Selection	Player name	Position	College	Notes
1	17	Fred McNeill	Linebacker	UCLA	From Falcons (Note: The Vikings traded QB Bob Lee and LB Lonnie Warwick to the Atlanta Falcons in exchange for a first-round selection (17th overall) and QB Bob Berry.)
1	25	Steve Riley	Offensive tackle	USC	
2	29	John Holland	Wide receiver	Tennessee State	From Chargers (Note: The Vikings traded LB Carl Gersbach and RB Clinton Jones to the San Diego Chargers in exchange for second- and third-round selections (29th and 64th overall).)
2	51	Matt Blair	Linebacker	Iowa State	
3	64	Steve Craig	Tight end	Northwestern	From Packers via Chargers
3	77	Scott Anderson	Center	Missouri	
4	86	Mike Townsend	Defensive back	Notre Dame	from Saints (Note: The Vikings traded TE Bob Brown to the New Orleans Saints in exchange for a fourth-round selection (86th overall) and a 1973 sixth-round selection (139th overall).)
4	103	Traded to the Cincinnati Bengals (Note: The Vikings traded a fourth-round selection (103rd overall) to the Cincinnati Bengals in exchange for G Steve Lawson.)			
5	120	Jim Ferguson	Defensive back	Stanford	From Broncos (Note: The Vikings traded WR Gene Washington to the Denver Broncos in exchange for a fifth-round selection (120th overall) and WR Rod Sherman.)
5	128	Traded to the Philadelphia Eagles (Note: The Vikings traded the fifth-round selection they received from the Rams (128th overall) to the Philadelphia Eagles in exchange for LB Ron Porter.)			From Rams (Note: The Vikings traded CB Charlie Stukes to the Los Angeles Rams in exchange for a fifth-round selection (128th overall).)
5	129	Traded to the Baltimore Colts (Note: The Vikings traded a fifth-round selection (129th overall) to the Baltimore Colts in exchange for CB Charlie Stukes.)			
6	155	Mark Kellar	Running back	Northern Illinois	
7	181	Fred Tabron	Running back	Southwest Missouri State	
8	207	Berl Simmons	Placekicker	TCU	
9	232	Sam McCullum	Wide receiver	Montana State	
10	259	Barry Reed	Running back	Peru State	
11	285	Dave Boone	Defensive end	Eastern Michigan	
12	311	Randy Poltl	Defensive back	Stanford	
13	337	Gary Keller	Defensive tackle	Utah	
14	363	Alan Dixon	Running back	Harding	
15	389	Kurt Wachtler	Defensive tackle	St. John's	
16	415	John Goebel	Running back	St. Thomas (MN)	
17	441	Earl Garrett	Defensive back	Boston State	

== Roster ==
1974 Minnesota Vikings roster
Quarterbacks (QB): 17 Bob Berry; 10 Fran Tarkenton; Running backs (RB): 30 Bill Brown; 44 Chuck Foreman; 49 Ed Marinaro; 33 Brent McClanahan; 41 Dave Osborn; 32 Oscar Reed; Wide receivers (WR): 42 John Gilliam; 85 John Holland; 82 Jim Lash; 80 Sam McCullum; Tight ends (TE): 84 Steve Craig; 89 Doug Kingsriter; 83 Stu Voigt	Offensive linemen (OL): 67 Grady Alderman T; 56 Scott Anderson C; 68 Charlie Goodrum T; 65 Steve Lawson G; 66 Andy Maurer G; 78 Steve Riley T; 64 Milt Sunde G; 53 Mick Tingelhoff C; 62 Ed White G; 73 Ron Yary T; Defensive linemen (DL): 71 David Boone DE; 81 Carl Eller DE; 77 Gary Larsen DT; 75 Bob Lurtsema DE/DT; 70 Jim Marshall DE; 88 Alan Page DT; 69 Doug Sutherland DT	Linebackers (LB): 59 Matt Blair OLB; 58 Wally Hilgenberg OLB; 55 Amos Martin OLB; 54 Fred McNeill OLB; 50 Jeff Siemon MLB; 60 Roy Winston OLB; Defensive backs (DB): 21 Joe Blahak CB; 24 Terry Brown SS; 22 Paul Krause FS; 29 Randy Poltl FS; 25 Jackie Wallace CB; 23 Jeff Wright SS; 43 Nate Wright CB; Special teams (ST): 14 Fred Cox K; 11 Mike Eischeid P	Practice squad: None - Vacant; Reserve: 20 Bobby Bryant CB (IR); 45 Alan Dixon RB (IR); 72 John Ward G (PUP); 15 Mike Wells QB (IR); Rookies in italics 47 active, 4 reserve, 0 practice squad

== Preseason ==
Week	Date	Opponent	Result	Record	Venue	Attendance
1	August 10	at Denver Broncos	L 21–27	0–1	Mile High Stadium	23,822
2	August 19	at Miami Dolphins	L 9–21	0–2	Miami Orange Bowl	67,693
3	August 25	Buffalo Bills	W 32–13	1–2	Metropolitan Stadium	46,553
4	August 31	at St. Louis Cardinals	W 14–10	2–2	Busch Memorial Stadium	38,040
5	September 7	San Diego Chargers	W 42–0	3–2	Metropolitan Stadium	46,553

== Regular season ==
=== Schedule ===
Week	Date	Opponent	Result	Record	Venue	Attendance
1	September 15	at Green Bay Packers	W 32–17	1–0	Lambeau Field	56,267
2	September 22	at Detroit Lions	W 7–6	2–0	Tiger Stadium	49,703
3	September 29	Chicago Bears	W 11–7	3–0	Metropolitan Stadium	46,217
4	October 6	at Dallas Cowboys	W 23–21	4–0	Texas Stadium	57,847
5	October 13	Houston Oilers	W 51–10	5–0	Metropolitan Stadium	48,006
6	October 20	Detroit Lions	L 16–20	5–1	Metropolitan Stadium	47,807
7	October 27	New England Patriots	L 14–17	5–2	Metropolitan Stadium	48,177
8	November 3	at Chicago Bears	W 17–0	6–2	Soldier Field	33,343
9	November 11	at St. Louis Cardinals	W 28–24	7–2	Civic Center Busch Memorial Stadium	50,183
10	November 17	Green Bay Packers	L 7–19	7–3	Metropolitan Stadium	47,924
11	November 24	at Los Angeles Rams	L 17–20	7–4	Los Angeles Memorial Coliseum	90,266
12	December 1	New Orleans Saints	W 29–9	8–4	Metropolitan Stadium	44,202
13	December 7	Atlanta Falcons	W 23–10	9–4	Metropolitan Stadium	47,105
14	December 14	at Kansas City Chiefs	W 35–15	10–4	Arrowhead Stadium	35,480

=== Game summaries ===
==== Week 1: at Green Bay Packers ====
Week 1: Minnesota Vikings at Green Bay Packers – Game summary

Quarter	1	2	3	4	Total
Vikings	3	7	13	9	32
Packers	0	10	0	7	17

at Lambeau Field, Green Bay, Wisconsin

- Date: September 15
- Game time: 1:00 p.m. CDT
- Game weather: 60 °F (16 °C)
- Game attendance: 56,267
- Box Score

Game information

First quarter

- MIN – Fred Cox 20-yard field goal. Vikings 3–0.

Second quarter

- GB – Chester Marcol 19-yard field goal. Tie 3–3.
- GB – John Brockington 5-yard run (Chester Marcol kick). Packers 10–3.
- MIN – Chuck Foreman 18-yard run (Fred Cox kick). Tie 10–10.

Third quarter

- MIN – Chuck Foreman 1-yard run (Fred Cox kick). Vikings 17–10.
- MIN – Chuck Foreman 3-yard run (kick failed). Vikings 23–10.

Fourth quarter

- MIN – Fred Cox 21-yard field goal. Vikings 26–10.
- GB – Steve Odom 18-yard run (Chester Marcol kick). Vikings 26–17.
- MIN – Amos Martin 15-yard fumble return (kick failed). Vikings 32–17.

Top passers

- MIN – Fran Tarkenton – 14/23, 116 yards, INT
- GB – Jerry Tagge – 9/20, 102 yards, 3 INT

Top rushers

- MIN – Chuck Foreman – 22 rushes, 67 yards, 3 TD
- GB – John Brockington – 18 rushes, 53 yards, TD

Top receivers

- MIN – Chuck Foreman – 5 receptions, 32 yards
- GB – Barry Smith – 2 receptions, 29 yards

==== Week 2: at Detroit Lions ====
Week 2: Minnesota Vikings at Detroit Lions – Game summary

Quarter	1	2	3	4	Total
Vikings	0	7	0	0	7
Lions	0	3	0	3	6

at Tiger Stadium, Detroit, Michigan

- Date: September 22
- Game time: 12:00 p.m. CDT
- Game weather: 48 °F (9 °C), Wind 15 mph
- Game attendance: 49,703
- Pro-Football-Reference.com

Game information

First quarter

- No scoring plays.

Second quarter

- DET – Errol Mann 29-yard field goal. Lions 3–0.
- MIN – Chuck Foreman 11-yard run (Fred Cox kick). Vikings 7–3.

Third quarter

- No scoring plays.

Fourth quarter

- DET – Errol Mann 40-yard field goal. Vikings 7–6.

Top passers

- MIN – Fran Tarkenton – 12/24, 142 yards
- DET – Bill Munson – 12/18, 56 yards

Top rushers

- MIN – Chuck Foreman – 13 rushes, 83 yards, TD
- DET – Altie Taylor – 16 rushes, 57 yards

Top receivers

- MIN – John Gilliam – 4 receptions, 87 yards
- DET – Steve Owens – 5 receptions, 29 yards

==== Week 3: vs. Chicago Bears ====
Week 3: Chicago Bears at Minnesota Vikings – Game summary

Quarter	1	2	3	4	Total
Bears	0	0	0	7	7
Vikings	2	6	3	0	11

at Metropolitan Stadium, Bloomington, Minnesota

- Date: September 29
- Game time: 1:00 p.m. CDT
- Game weather: 47 °F (8 °C), Wind 11 mph
- Game attendance: 46,217
- Pro-Football-Reference.com

Game information

First quarter

- MIN – Wally Hilgenberg tackled Bob Parsons in the end zone for a safety. Vikings 2–0.

Second quarter

- MIN – Stu Voigt 11-yard pass from Fran Tarkenton (kick failed). Vikings 8–0.

Third quarter

- MIN – Fred Cox 32-yard field goal. Vikings 11–0.

Fourth quarter

- CHI – Gary Huff 3-yard run (Mirro Roder kick). Vikings 11–7.

Top passers

- CHI – Gary Huff – 16/27, 171 yards, 2 INT
- MIN – Fran Tarkenton – 16/25, 165 yards, TD, 2 INT

Top rushers

- CHI – Ken Grandberry – 19 rushes, 76 yards
- MIN – Chuck Foreman – 16 rushes, 74 yards

Top receivers

- CHI – Charlie Wade – 6 receptions, 112 yards
- MIN – Stu Voigt – 5 receptions, 50 yards, TD

==== Week 4: at Dallas Cowboys ====
Week 4: Minnesota Vikings at Dallas Cowboys – Game summary

Quarter	1	2	3	4	Total
Vikings	3	10	7	3	23
Cowboys	7	0	0	14	21

at Texas Stadium, Irving, Texas

- Date: October 6
- Game time: 3:00 p.m. CDT
- Game weather: 75 °F (24 °C), Wind 12 mph
- Game attendance: 57,847
- Pro-Football-Reference.com

Game information

First quarter

- DAL – Golden Richards 58-yard pass from Roger Staubach (Efren Herrera kick). Cowboys 7–0.
- MIN – Fred Cox 46-yard field goal. Cowboys 7–3.

Second quarter

- MIN – Chuck Foreman 66-yard pass from Fran Tarkenton (Fred Cox kick). Vikings 10–7.
- MIN – Fred Cox 30-yard field goal. Vikings 13–7.

Third quarter

- MIN – Chuck Foreman 13-yard pass from Fran Tarkenton (Fred Cox kick). Vikings 20–7.

Fourth quarter

- DAL – Walt Garrison 5-yard pass from Roger Staubach (Efren Herrera kick). Vikings 20–14.
- DAL – Calvin Hill 6-yard run (Efren Herrera kick). Cowboys 21–20.
- MIN – Fred Cox 27-yard field goal. Vikings 23–21.

Top passers

- MIN – Fran Tarkenton – 17/27, 283 yards, 2 TD
- DAL – Roger Staubach – 9/20, 144 yards, 2 TD, 4 INT

Top rushers

- MIN – Chuck Foreman – 23 rushes, 72 yards
- DAL – Calvin Hill – 21 rushes, 95 yards, TD

Top receivers

- MIN – Chuck Foreman – 5 receptions, 131 yards, 2 TD
- DAL – Golden Richards – 1 reception, 58 yards, TD

==== Week 5: vs. Houston Oilers ====
Week 5: Houston Oilers at Minnesota Vikings – Game summary

Quarter	1	2	3	4	Total
Oilers	3	0	7	0	10
Vikings	16	14	7	14	51

at Metropolitan Stadium, Bloomington, Minnesota

- Date: October 13
- Game time: 1:00 p.m. CDT
- Game weather: 46 °F (8 °C), Wind 9 mph
- Game attendance: 48,006
- Pro-Football-Reference.com

Game information

First quarter

- MIN – John Gilliam 80-yard pass from Fran Tarkenton (Fred Cox kick). Vikings 7–0.
- HOU – Skip Butler 29-yard field goal. Vikings 7–3.
- MIN – Fred Cox 42-yard field goal. Vikings 10–3.
- MIN – Stu Voigt 10-yard pass from Fran Tarkenton (kick failed). Vikings 16–3.

Second quarter

- MIN – Ed Marinaro 1-yard run (Fred Cox kick). Vikings 23–3.
- MIN – Chuck Foreman 6-yard run (Fred Cox kick). Vikings 30–3.

Third quarter

- HOU – Vic Washington 2-yard run (Skip Butler kick). Vikings 30–10.
- MIN – Chuck Foreman 24-yard pass from Fran Tarkenton (Fred Cox kick). Vikings 37–10.

Fourth quarter

- MIN – Steve Craig 10-yard pass from Bob Berry (Fred Cox kick). Vikings 44–10.
- MIN – Sam McCullum 20-yard pass from Bob Berry (Fred Cox kick). Vikings 51–10.

Top passers

- HOU – Dan Pastorini – 16/32, 167 yards, 4 INT
- MIN – Fran Tarkenton – 18/24, 274 yards, 3 TD

Top rushers

- HOU – Willie Rodgers – 11 rushes, 42 yards
- MIN – Chuck Foreman – 16 rushes, 61 yards, TD

Top receivers

- HOU – Billy Johnson – 3 receptions, 52 yards
- MIN – John Gilliam – 2 receptions, 102 yards, TD

==== Week 6: vs. Detroit Lions ====
Week 6: Detroit Lions at Minnesota Vikings – Game summary

Quarter	1	2	3	4	Total
Lions	0	6	7	7	20
Vikings	0	3	13	0	16

at Metropolitan Stadium, Bloomington, Minnesota

- Date: October 20
- Game time: 1:00 p.m. CDT
- Game weather: 38 °F (3 °C), Wind 10 mph
- Game attendance: 47,807
- Pro-Football-Reference.com

Game information

First quarter

- No scoring plays.

Second quarter

- MIN – Fred Cox 23-yard field goal. Vikings 3–0.
- DET – Errol Mann 36-yard field goal. Tied 3–3.
- DET – Errol Mann 27-yard field goal. Lions 6–3.

Third quarter

- MIN – Chuck Foreman 1-yard run (Fred Cox kick). Vikings 10–6.
- DET – Altie Taylor 1-yard run (Errol Mann kick). Lions 13–10.
- MIN – Chuck Foreman 9-yard pass from Fran Tarkenton (kick failed). Vikings 16–13.

Fourth quarter

- DET – Altie Taylor 8-yard run (Errol Mann kick). Lions 20–16.

Top passers

- DET – Bill Munson – 22/32, 276 yards
- MIN – Fran Tarkenton – 18/30, 229 yards, TD, INT

Top rushers

- DET – Steve Owens – 13 rushes, 59 yards
- MIN – Dave Osborn – 14 rushes, 96 yards

Top receivers

- DET – Ron Jessie – 10 receptions, 116 yards
- MIN – Jim Lash – 4 receptions, 89 yards

==== Week 7: vs. New England Patriots ====
Week 7: New England Patriots at Minnesota Vikings – Game summary

Quarter	1	2	3	4	Total
Patriots	3	7	0	7	17
Vikings	0	0	0	14	14

at Metropolitan Stadium, Bloomington, Minnesota

- Date: October 27
- Game time: 1:00 p.m. CST
- Game weather: 54 °F (12 °C), Wind 10 mph
- Game attendance: 48,177
- Pro-Football-Reference.com

Game information

First quarter

- NE – John Smith 37-yard field goal. Patriots 3–0.

Second quarter

- NE – Steve Schubert 21-yard pass from Jim Plunkett (John Smith kick). Patriots 10–0.

Third quarter

- No scoring plays.

Fourth quarter

- MIN – Chuck Foreman 2-yard run (Fred Cox kick). Patriots 10–7.
- MIN – Fran Tarkenton 3-yard run (Fred Cox kick). Vikings 14–10.
- NE – Bob Windsor 10-yard pass from Jim Plunkett (John Smith kick). Patriots 17–14.

Top passers

- NE – Jim Plunkett – 15/28, 238 yards, 2 TD, 2 INT
- MIN – Fran Tarkenton – 19/39, 281 yards, 3 INT

Top rushers

- NE – Sam Cunningham – 22 rushes, 129 yards
- MIN – Chuck Foreman – 17 rushes, 68 yards, TD

Top receivers

- NE – Reggie Rucker – 3 receptions, 61 yards
- MIN – John Gilliam – 5 receptions, 117 yards

==== Week 8: at Chicago Bears ====
Week 8: Minnesota Vikings at Chicago Bears – Game summary

Quarter	1	2	3	4	Total
Vikings	3	0	7	7	17
Bears	0	0	0	0	0

at Soldier Field, Chicago, Illinois

- Date: November 3
- Game time: 1:00 p.m. CST
- Game weather: 52 °F (11 °C), Wind 13 mph
- Game attendance: 33,343
- Pro-Football-Reference.com

Game information

First quarter

- MIN – Fred Cox 23-yard field goal. Vikings 3–0.

Second quarter

- No scoring plays.

Third quarter

- MIN – John Gilliam 35-yard pass from Fran Tarkenton (Fred Cox kick). Vikings 10–0.

Fourth quarter

- MIN – Stu Voigt 4-yard pass from Fran Tarkenton (Fred Cox kick). Vikings 17–0.

Top passers

- MIN – Fran Tarkenton – 9/18, 80 yards, 2 TD, INT
- CHI – Gary Huff – 11/24, 74 yards, INT

Top rushers

- MIN – Dave Osborn – 24 rushes, 98 yards
- CHI – Carl Garrett – 4 rushes, 23 yards

Top receivers

- MIN – John Gilliam – 1 reception, 35 yards, TD
- CHI – Jim Kelly – 2 receptions, 38 yards

==== Week 9: at St. Louis Cardinals ====
Week 9: Minnesota Vikings at St. Louis Cardinals – Game summary

Quarter	1	2	3	4	Total
Vikings	14	0	7	7	28
Cardinals	7	10	0	7	24

at Civic Center Busch Memorial Stadium, St. Louis, Missouri

- Date: Monday, November 11
- Game time: 8:00 p.m. CST
- Game weather: 50 °F (10 °C), Wind 12 mph
- Game attendance: 50,183
- TV announcers (ABC): Frank Gifford, Howard Cosell, and Alex Karras
- Pro-Football-Reference.com

Game information

First quarter

- MIN – Dave Osborn 1-yard run (Fred Cox kick). Vikings 7–0.
- STL – J. V. Cain 40-yard pass from Jim Hart (Jim Bakken kick). Tied 7–7.
- MIN – John Gilliam 10-yard pass from Fran Tarkenton (Fred Cox kick). Vikings 14–7.

Second quarter

- STL – Jim Bakken 46-yard field goal. Vikings 14–10.
- STL – Earl Thomas 12-yard pass from Jim Hart (Jim Bakken kick). Cardinals 17–14.

Third quarter

- MIN – Chuck Foreman 13-yard run (Fred Cox kick). Vikings 21–17.

Fourth quarter

- MIN – Fran Tarkenton 11-yard run (Fred Cox kick). Vikings 28–17.
- STL – Jim Hart 4-yard run (Jim Bakken kick). Vikings 28–24.

Top passers

- MIN – Fran Tarkenton – 14/29, 137 yards, TD, INT
- STL – Jim Hart – 28/43, 353 yards, 2 TD, INT

Top rushers

- MIN – Dave Osborn – 23 rushes, 98 yards, TD
- STL – Jim Otis – 14 rushes, 50 yards

Top receivers

- MIN – Dave Osborn – 7 receptions, 71 yards
- STL – Mel Gray – 6 receptions, 91 yards

==== Week 10: vs. Green Bay Packers ====
Week 10: Green Bay Packers at Minnesota Vikings – Game summary

Quarter	1	2	3	4	Total
Packers	0	6	3	10	19
Vikings	0	0	0	7	7

at Metropolitan Stadium, Bloomington, Minnesota

- Date: November 17
- Game time: 1:00 p.m. CST
- Game weather: 33 °F (1 °C), Wind 8 mph
- Game attendance: 47,924
- Pro-Football-Reference.com

Game information

First quarter

- No scoring plays.

Second quarter

- GB – Chester Marcol 28-yard field goal. Packers 3–0.
- GB – Chester Marcol 31-yard field goal. Packers 6–0.

Third quarter

- GB – Chester Marcol 19-yard field goal. Packers 9–0.

Fourth quarter

- GB – Chester Marcol 18-yard field goal. Packers 12–0.
- MIN – Chuck Foreman 24-yard pass from Fran Tarkenton (Fred Cox kick). Packers 12–7.
- GB – MacArthur Lane 68-yard pass from John Hadl (Chester Marcol kick). Packers 19–7.

Top passers

- GB – John Hadl – 10/19, 199 yards, TD
- MIN – Fran Tarkenton – 15/31, 222 yards, TD, INT

Top rushers

- GB – John Brockington – 32 rushes, 137 yards
- MIN – Chuck Foreman – 10 rushes, 39 yards

Top receivers

- GB – MacArthur Lane – 1 reception, 68 yards, TD
- MIN – Jim Lash – 6 receptions, 136 yards

==== Week 11: at Los Angeles Rams ====
Week 11: Minnesota Vikings at Los Angeles Rams – Game summary

Quarter	1	2	3	4	Total
Vikings	0	17	0	0	17
Rams	0	6	0	14	20

at Los Angeles Memorial Coliseum, Los Angeles, California

- Date: November 24
- Game time: 3:00 p.m. CST
- Game weather: 65 °F (18 °C), Wind 8 mph
- Game attendance: 90,266
- Pro-Football-Reference.com

Game information

First quarter

- No scoring plays.

Second quarter

- MIN – Fred Cox 36-yard field goal. Vikings 3–0.
- MIN – Chuck Foreman 1-yard run (Fred Cox kick). Vikings 10–0.
- LA – James Harris 1-yard run (kick failed). Vikings 10–6.
- MIN – Chuck Foreman 12-yard pass from Fran Tarkenton (Fred Cox kick). Vikings 17–6.

Third quarter

- No scoring plays.

Fourth quarter

- LA – James Harris 1-yard run (David Ray kick). Vikings 17–13.
- LA – Jack Snow 8-yard pass from James Harris (David Ray kick). Rams 20–17.

Top passers

- MIN – Fran Tarkenton – 19/35, 217 yards, TD, INT
- LA – James Harris – 24/37, 249 yards, TD

Top rushers

- MIN – Chuck Foreman – 12 rushes, 49 yards, TD
- LA – Lawrence McCutcheon – 15 rushes, 64 yards

Top receivers

- MIN – Chuck Foreman – 9 receptions, 88 yards, TD
- LA – Jack Snow – 7 receptions, 91 yards, TD

==== Week 12: vs. New Orleans Saints ====
Week 12: New Orleans Saints at Minnesota Vikings – Game summary

Quarter	1	2	3	4	Total
Saints	3	6	0	0	9
Vikings	6	6	3	14	29

at Metropolitan Stadium, Bloomington, Minnesota

- Date: December 1
- Game time: 1:00 p.m. CST
- Game weather: 25 °F (−4 °C), Wind 11 mph
- Game attendance: 44,202
- Pro-Football-Reference.com

Game information

First quarter

- MIN – Dave Osborn 2-yard run (kick failed). Vikings 6–0.
- NO – Bill McClard 27-yard field goal. Vikings 6–3.

Second quarter

- NO – Alvin Maxson 1-yard run (kick failed). Saints 9–6.
- MIN – Stu Voigt 4-yard pass from Fran Tarkenton (conversion failed). Vikings 12–9.

Third quarter

- MIN – Fred Cox 25-yard field goal. Vikings 15–9.

Fourth quarter

- MIN – John Gilliam 13-yard pass from Fran Tarkenton (Fred Cox kick). Vikings 22–9.
- MIN – John Gilliam 22-yard pass from Fran Tarkenton (Fred Cox kick). Vikings 29–9.

Top passers

- NO – Archie Manning – 9/18, 100 yards
- MIN – Fran Tarkenton – 20/29, 317 yards, 3 TD

Top rushers

- NO – Alvin Maxson – 18 rushes, 98 yards, TD
- MIN – Chuck Foreman – 19 rushes, 54 yards

Top receivers

- NO – Bob Newland – 2 receptions, 51 yards
- MIN – Jim Lash – 3 receptions, 112 yards

==== Week 13: vs. Atlanta Falcons ====
Week 13: Atlanta Falcons at Minnesota Vikings – Game summary

Quarter	1	2	3	4	Total
Falcons	0	7	0	3	10
Vikings	7	3	6	7	23

at Metropolitan Stadium, Bloomington, Minnesota

- Date: Saturday, December 7
- Game time: 12:00 p.m. CST
- Game weather: 28 °F (−2 °C), Wind 10 mph
- Game attendance: 47,105
- Pro-Football-Reference.com

Game information

First quarter

- MIN – Dave Osborn 10-yard run (Fred Cox kick). Vikings 7–0.

Second quarter

- ATL – Art Malone 1-yard run (Nick Mike-Mayer kick). Tied 7–7.
- MIN – Fred Cox 21-yard field goal. Vikings 10–7.

Third quarter

- MIN – Dave Osborn 5-yard run (kick failed). Vikings 16–7.

Fourth quarter

- ATL – Nick Mike-Mayer 36-yard field goal. Vikings 16–10.
- MIN – Stu Voigt 10-yard pass from Bob Berry (Fred Cox kick). Vikings 23–10.

Top passers

- ATL – Kim McQuilken – 11/25, 125 yards, 2 INT
- MIN – Bob Berry – 14/22, 114 yards, TD, INT

Top rushers

- ATL – Art Malone – 10 rushes, 54 yards, TD
- MIN – Dave Osborn – 24 rushes, 96 yards, 2 TD

Top receivers

- ATL – Ken Burrow – 3 receptions, 50 yards
- MIN – Dave Osborn – 6 receptions, 39 yards

==== Week 14: at Kansas City Chiefs ====
Week 14: Minnesota Vikings at Kansas City Chiefs – Game summary

Quarter	1	2	3	4	Total
Vikings	0	14	7	14	35
Chiefs	3	9	0	3	15

at Arrowhead Stadium, Kansas City, Missouri

- Date: Saturday, December 14
- Game time: 2:45 p.m. CST
- Game weather: 35 °F (2 °C), Wind 13 mph
- Game attendance: 35,480
- Pro-Football-Reference.com

Game information

First quarter

- KC – Jan Stenerud 37-yard field goal. Chiefs 3–0.

Second quarter

- KC – Jan Stenerud 32-yard field goal. Chiefs 6–0.
- MIN – Sam McCullum 34-yard pass from Fran Tarkenton (Fred Cox kick). Vikings 7–6.
- MIN – Sam McCullum 10-yard pass from Fran Tarkenton (Fred Cox kick). Vikings 14–6.
- KC – Emmitt Thomas 73-yard interception return (kick failed). Vikings 14–12.

Third quarter

- MIN – Ed Marinaro 7-yard pass from Bob Berry (Fred Cox kick). Vikings 21–12.

Fourth quarter

- KC – Jan Stenerud 29-yard field goal. Vikings 21–15.
- MIN – Oscar Reed 3-yard pass from Bob Berry (Fred Cox kick). Vikings 28–15.
- MIN – Brent McClanahan 6-yard run (Fred Cox kick). Vikings 35–15.

Top passers

- MIN – Fran Tarkenton – 8/17, 135 yards, 2 TD, INT
- KC – Len Dawson – 9/16, 124 yards, INT

Top rushers

- MIN – Oscar Reed – 15 rushes, 57 yards
- KC – Cleo Miller – 12 rushes, 45 yards

Top receivers

- MIN – Sam McCullum – 6 receptions, 118 yards, 2 TD
- KC – Elmo Wright – 3 receptions, 75 yards

=== Standings ===
NFC Central
	W	L	T	PCT	DIV	CONF	PF	PA	STK
Minnesota Vikings	10	4	0	.714	4–2	8–3	310	195	W3
Detroit Lions	7	7	0	.500	3–3	6–5	256	270	L1
Green Bay Packers	6	8	0	.429	3–3	4–7	210	206	L3
Chicago Bears	4	10	0	.286	2–4	4–7	152	279	L2

== Playoffs ==
=== Schedule ===
Week	Date	Opponent	Result	Venue	Attendance
Divisional	December 21	St. Louis Cardinals	W 30–14	Metropolitan Stadium	48,150
Conference	December 29	Los Angeles Rams	W 14–10	Metropolitan Stadium	48,444
Super Bowl IX	January 12	Pittsburgh Steelers	L 6–16	Tulane Stadium	80,997

=== Game summaries ===
==== NFC Divisional Playoff: vs. St. Louis Cardinals ====
NFC Divisional Playoff: St. Louis Cardinals at Minnesota Vikings – Game summary

Quarter	1	2	3	4	Total
Cardinals	0	7	0	7	14
Vikings	0	7	16	7	30

at Metropolitan Stadium, Bloomington, Minnesota

- Date: December 21
- Game time: 12:00 p.m. CST
- Game weather: 19 °F (−7 °C), flurries
- Game attendance: 48,150
- Referee: Chuck Heberling
- TV announcers (CBS): Brent Musburger, Irv Cross and Johnny Unitas
- Pro-Football-Reference.com

Game information

First quarter

- No scoring plays.

Second quarter

- STL – Earl Thomas 13-yard pass from Jim Hart (Jim Bakken kick). Cardinals 7–0.
- MIN – John Gilliam 16-yard pass from Fran Tarkenton (Fred Cox kick). Tied 7–7.

Third quarter

- MIN – Fred Cox 37-yard field goal. Vikings 10–7.
- MIN – Nate Wright 20-yard fumble return (Fred Cox kick). Vikings 17–7.
- MIN – John Gilliam 38-yard pass from Fran Tarkenton (kick failed). Vikings 23–7.

Fourth quarter

- MIN – Chuck Foreman 4-yard run (Fred Cox kick). Vikings 30–7.
- STL – Terry Metcalf 11-yard run (Jim Bakken kick). Vikings 30–14.

Top passers

- STL – Jim Hart – 18/40, 200 yards, TD, INT
- MIN – Fran Tarkenton – 13/23, 169 yards, 2 TD, 2 INT

Top rushers

- STL – Terry Metcalf – 15 rushes, 55 yards, TD
- MIN – Chuck Foreman – 23 rushes, 114 yards, TD

Top receivers

- STL – Mel Gray – 5 receptions, 77 yards
- MIN – Chuck Foreman – 5 receptions, 54 yards

Aided by the Cardinals' turnovers, the Vikings scored 16 points in less than 7 minutes in the third quarter. On their first possession of the game, St. Louis drove to the Vikings 35-yard line, but lost the ball on a failed 4th-and-1 conversion attempt. St. Louis eventually got onto the scoreboard first with quarterback Jim Hart's 13-yard touchdown pass to receiver Earl Thomas, but Minnesota countered when quarterback Fran Tarkenton completed a 16-yard touchdown pass to John Gilliam. The 7–7 tie would last till the end of the half. The Cardinals had a chance to take the lead with a 56-yard drive to the Vikings 6-yard line, but Jim Bakken missed a 23-yard field goal attempt as time expired.

On the third play of the second half, Vikings defensive back Jeff Wright intercepted a pass from Hart and returned it 18 yards to set up Fred Cox's 37-yard field goal, giving his team a 10–7 lead. Exactly 60 seconds later, on the Cardinals' ensuing drive, Terry Metcalf lost a fumble while being leveled by Vikings linemen Alan Page and Carl Eller. Cornerback Nate Wright picked up the loose ball and returned it 20 yards for a touchdown that increased Minnesota's lead to 17–7. A few minutes later, Tarkenton finished off a 16-point quarter with a 38-yard touchdown pass to Gilliam. In the fourth quarter, Vikings running back Chuck Foreman, who finished the game with 114 rushing yards and 5 receptions for 54 yards, recorded a 4-yard touchdown run to give Minnesota a 30–7 lead. By the time Metcalf rushed for an 11-yard fourth-quarter touchdown, the game was already out of reach for the Cardinals.

==== NFC Championship Game: vs. Los Angeles Rams ====
NFC Championship Game: Los Angeles Rams at Minnesota Vikings – Game summary

Quarter	1	2	3	4	Total
Rams	0	3	0	7	10
Vikings	0	7	0	7	14

at Metropolitan Stadium, Bloomington, Minnesota

- Date: December 29
- Game time: 12:00 p.m. CST
- Game weather: Sunny, 29 °F (−2 °C)
- Game attendance: 48,444
- Referee: Tommy Bell
- TV announcers (CBS): Pat Summerall, Tom Brookshier and Bart Starr
- Pro-Football-Reference.com

Game information

First quarter

- No scoring plays.

Second quarter

- MIN – Jim Lash 29-yard pass from Fran Tarkenton (Fred Cox kick). Vikings 7–0.
- LA – David Ray 27-yard field goal. Vikings 7–3.

Third quarter

- No scoring plays.

Fourth quarter

- MIN – Dave Osborn 4-yard run (Fred Cox kick). Vikings 14–3.
- LA – Harold Jackson 44-yard pass from James Harris (David Ray kick). Vikings 14–10.

Top passers

- LA – James Harris – 13/23, 248 yards, TD, 2 INT
- MIN – Fran Tarkenton – 10/20, 123 yards, TD, INT

Top rushers

- LA – Jim Bertelsen – 14 rushes, 65 yards
- MIN – Chuck Foreman – 22 rushes, 80 yards

Top receivers

- LA – Harold Jackson – 3 receptions, 139 yards, TD
- MIN – Stu Voigt – 4 receptions, 43 yards

On an unusually balmy day for December in Minnesota, the Vikings were able to hold onto the ball for the final 5:37 of the game to preserve a 14–10 victory. After a scoreless first quarter, Minnesota quarterback Fran Tarkenton threw a 29-yard touchdown to Jim Lash. Rams kicker David Ray later added a 27-yard field goal to cut the lead to 7–3 before halftime. In the third quarter, Los Angeles advanced the ball from their own 1-yard line to the Minnesota 1-yard line. The big play on the drive was a 73-yard pass play to Harold Jackson, who was finally pushed out of bounds at the Vikings 2 by safety Jeff Wright. With the ball inside the one-yard line, Rams guard Tom Mack was controversially called for illegal procedure (replays showed Mack did not move). Moved back to the six-yard line, the Rams were forced to pass for a touchdown on third down but the pass was deflected and Vikings linebacker Wally Hilgenberg intercepted the ball in the end zone for a touchback. Minnesota then went on a 15-play drive that took almost eight minutes off the clock to score on Dave Osborn's 4-yard touchdown run. With 7:15 left to play in the game, the Rams then cut the deficit to 14–10 with Harold Jackson's 44-yard touchdown reception. Then after forcing the Vikings to punt, Los Angeles drove to the Minnesota 45-yard line. But a third down sack forced the Rams to punt again and the Vikings kept the ball to run out the clock.

==== Super Bowl IX: vs. Pittsburgh Steelers ====
Super Bowl IX: Pittsburgh Steelers vs. Minnesota Vikings – Game summary

Quarter	1	2	3	4	Total
Steelers	0	2	7	7	16
Vikings	0	0	0	6	6

at Tulane Stadium, New Orleans, Louisiana

- Date: January 12, 1975
- Game time: 2:00 pm CST
- Game weather: Overcast, 51 °F (11 °C)
- Game attendance: 80,997
- Referee: Bernie Ulman
- TV announcers (NBC): Curt Gowdy, Al DeRogatis, and Don Meredith
- Pro-Football-Reference.com

Game information

First quarter

- No scoring plays.

Second quarter

- PIT – Fran Tarkenton sacked in the end zone by Dwight White for a safety. Steelers 2–0.

Third quarter

- PIT – Franco Harris 9-yard run (Roy Gerela kick). Steelers 9–0.

Fourth quarter

- MIN – Terry Brown blocked punt recovery in end zone (kick failed). Steelers 9–6.
- PIT – Larry Brown 4-yard pass from Terry Bradshaw (Roy Gerela kick). Steelers 16–6.

Top passers

- PIT – Terry Bradshaw – 9/14, 96 yards, TD
- MIN – Fran Tarkenton – 11/26, 102 yards, 3 INT

Top rushers

- PIT – Franco Harris – 34 rushes, 158 yards, TD
- MIN – Chuck Foreman – 12 rushes, 18 yards

Top receivers

- PIT – Larry Brown – 3 receptions, 49 yards, TD
- MIN – Chuck Foreman – 5 receptions, 50 yards

== Statistics ==
=== Team leaders ===
Category	Player(s)	Value
Passing yards	Fran Tarkenton	2,598
Passing touchdowns	Fran Tarkenton	17
Rushing yards	Chuck Foreman	777
Rushing touchdowns	Chuck Foreman	9
Receiving yards	Jim Lash	631
Receiving touchdowns	Chuck Foreman	6
Points	Chuck Foreman	90
Kickoff return yards	Brent McClanahan	549
Punt return yards	Jackie Wallace	191
Interceptions	Nate Wright	6

=== League rankings ===
Category	Total yards	Yards per game	NFL rank (out of 26)
Passing offense	2,755	196.8	2nd
Rushing offense	1,856	132.6	15th
Total offense	4,611	329.4	3rd
Passing defense	2,302	164.4	18th
Rushing defense	1,605	114.6	5th
Total defense	3,907	279.1	10th
