= 1973 Minnesota Vikings season =

NFL team season

- General manager: Jim Finks
- Head coach: Bud Grant
- Home stadium: Metropolitan Stadium

Results
- Record: 12–2
- Division place: 1st NFC Central
- Playoffs: Won Divisional Playoffs (vs. Redskins) 27–20; Won NFC Championship (at Cowboys) 27–10; Lost Super Bowl VIII (vs. Dolphins) 7–24
- All-Pros: DE Carl Eller (1st team); DT Alan Page (1st team); T Ron Yary (1st team)
- Pro Bowlers: DT Alan Page; T Ron Yary; DE Carl Eller; WR John Gilliam; S Paul Krause; LB Jeff Siemon; FB Chuck Foreman

Uniform
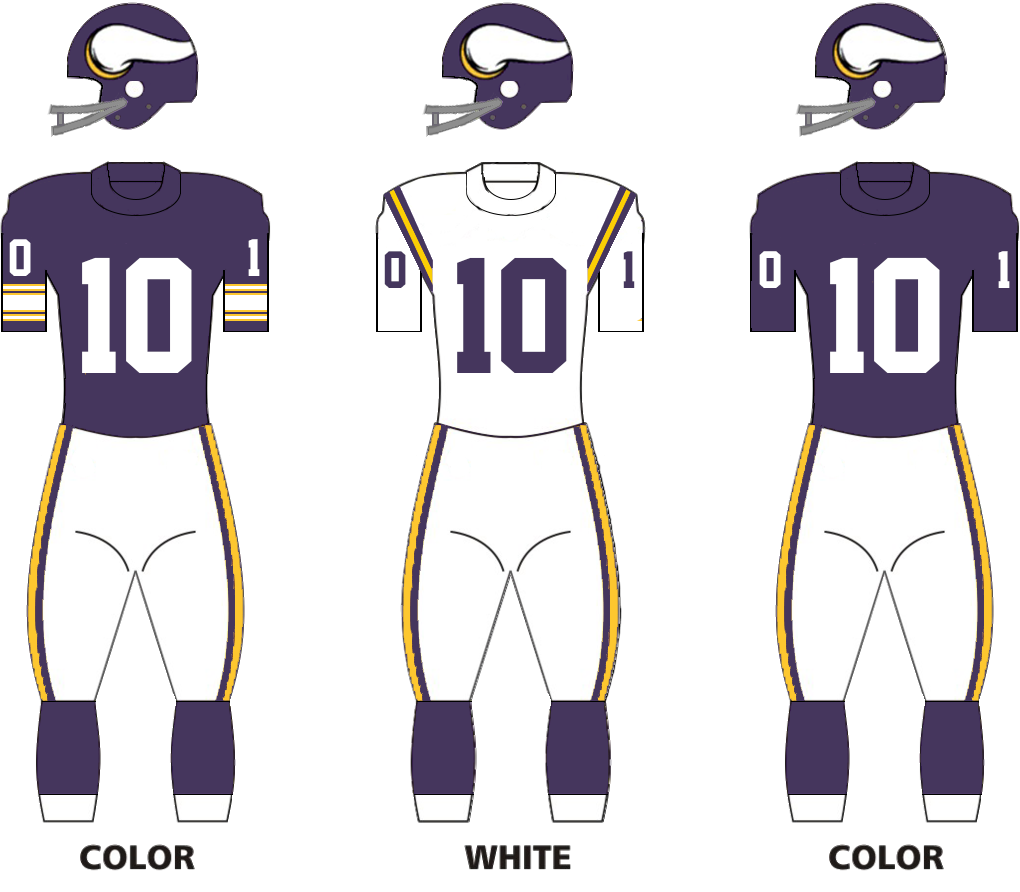

The 1973 season was the Minnesota Vikings' 13th in the National Football League (NFL). With a 12–2 record, the Vikings regained the NFC Central title after having gone 7–7 the previous year. They started the season 9–0 and looked a threat to the previous year's Miami Dolphins' record of a perfect season before losing to the Atlanta Falcons and Cincinnati Bengals in their next three games. Their narrow 10–9 win over the Los Angeles Rams constituted the last time until 1997 that the last two unbeaten NFL teams played each other.

The Vikings defeated the Washington Redskins 27–20 in the NFC Divisional Playoff game at home and went on to upset the Dallas Cowboys 27–10 in Irving, Texas to win the NFC Championship, before losing 24–7 to the Dolphins in Super Bowl VIII at Rice Stadium in Houston.

== Offseason ==
=== 1973 draft ===
Pro Bowler

1973 Minnesota Vikings draft selections
Round	Selection	Player	Position	College	Notes
1	12	Chuck Foreman	Running back	Miami (FL)	
2	34	Jackie Wallace	Cornerback	Arizona	From Cardinals (Note: The Vikings traded QB Gary Cuozzo to the St. Louis Cardinals in exchange for second- and fourth-round selections (34th and 89th overall), and WR John Gilliam.)
2	40	Traded to the New York Giants (Note: The Vikings traded a second-round selection (40th overall), a 1972 first-round selection (24th overall), QB Norm Snead, WR Bob Grim and RB Vince Clements to the New York Giants in exchange for QB Fran Tarkenton.)			
3	65	Jim Lash	Wide receiver	Northwestern	
4	80	Mike Wells	Quarterback	Illinois	From Eagles (Note: The Vikings traded QB Bill Cappleman to the Philadelphia Eagles in exchange for a fourth-round selection (80th overall).)
4	89	Traded to the Kansas City Chiefs (Note: The Vikings traded a fourth-round selection (89th overall) to the Kansas City Chiefs in exchange for P Mike Eischeid.)			From Vikings (Note: The Vikings traded a fourth-round selection (89th overall), LB Mike McGill and DB Dale Hackbart to the Los Angeles Rams in exchange for TE Bob Brown and CB Nate Wright.) via Cardinals
5	118	Brent McClanahan	Running back	Arizona State	
6	139	Doug Kingsriter	Tight end	Minnesota	From Saints (Note: The Vikings traded TE Bob Brown to the New Orleans Saints in exchange for a sixth-round selection (139th overall) and a 1974 fourth-round selection (86th overall).)
6	143	Fred Abbott	Linebacker	Florida	
7	168	Josh Brown	Running back	Southwest Texas State	
8	196	Craig Darling	Offensive tackle	Iowa	
9	221	Larry Dibbles	Defensive end	New Mexico	
10	236	Randy Lee	Defensive back	Tulane	From Eagles (Note: The Vikings traded LB Bill Cody to the Philadelphia Eagles in exchange for a 10th-round selection (236th overall).)
10	246	Dave Mason	Defensive back	Nebraska	
11	274	Geary Murdock	Guard	Iowa State	
12	299	Alan Spencer	Wide receiver	Pittsburg State	
13	324	Ron Just	Guard	Minot State	
14	352	Eddie Bishop	Defensive back	Southern	
15	377	Tony Chandler	Running back	Missouri Valley	
16	402	Larry Smiley	Defensive end	Texas Southern	
17	429	Dave Winfield	Tight end	Minnesota	Did not play college football (Note: Following college, Winfield was drafted by four teams in three different sports. The San Diego Padres selected him as an outfielder with the fourth overall pick in the 1973 Major League Baseball draft. In basketball, both the Atlanta Hawks (NBA) and the Utah Stars (ABA) drafted him. Although he never played college football, the Vikings selected Winfield in the 17th round of the NFL draft. As of 2024, he is one of three players ever to be drafted by three professional sports (the others being Dave Logan and Mickey McCarty).)

=== Undrafted free agents ===
1973 undrafted free agents of note
Player	Position	College
Gary Zauner	Punter	Wisconsin–La Crosse

== Roster ==
1973 Minnesota Vikings roster
Quarterbacks (QB): 17 Bob Berry; 10 Fran Tarkenton; Running backs (RB): 30 Bill Brown; 44 Chuck Foreman; 49 Ed Marinaro; 41 Dave Osborn; 32 Oscar Reed; Wide receivers (WR): 84 Carroll Dale; 42 John Gilliam; 82 Jim Lash; Tight ends (TE): 85 Gary Ballman; 83 Stu Voigt	Offensive linemen (OL): 67 Grady Alderman T; 66 Frank Gallagher G; 68 Charlie Goodrum T; 64 Milt Sunde G; 53 Mick Tingelhoff C; 62 Ed White G; 73 Ron Yary T; 51 Godfrey Zaunbrecher C; Defensive linemen (DL): 81 Carl Eller DE; 77 Gary Larsen DT; 75 Bob Lurtsema DE/DT; 70 Jim Marshall DE; 88 Alan Page DT; 69 Doug Sutherland DT	Linebackers (LB): 58 Wally Hilgenberg OLB; 55 Amos Martin OLB; 52 Ron Porter MLB; 50 Jeff Siemon MLB; 60 Roy Winston OLB; Defensive backs (DB): 24 Terry Brown FS; 20 Bobby Bryant CB; 22 Paul Krause FS; 34 Al Randolph SS; 40 Charlie West CB; 23 Jeff Wright SS; 43 Nate Wright CB; Special teams (ST): 14 Fred Cox K; 11 Mike Eischeid P	Practice squad: 86 Rhett Dawson WR; 89 Doug Kingsriter TE; 65 Steve Lawson G; 33 Brent McClanahan RB; 74 Larry Smiley DE; 25 Jackie Wallace CB; 15 Mike Wells QB; Reserve: 29 Karl Kassulke S (IR); 72 John Ward G (IR); Rookies in italics

== Preseason ==
Week	Date	Opponent	Result	Record	Venue	Attendance
1	August 11	Pittsburgh Steelers	W 10–6	1–0	Metropolitan Stadium	46,619
2	August 18	at Kansas City Chiefs	W 13–10	2–0	Arrowhead Stadium	72,676
3	August 25	at Oakland Raiders	W 34–10	3–0	Memorial Stadium (Berkeley, CA)	57,515
4	August 31	Miami Dolphins	W 20–17	4–0	Metropolitan Stadium	46,619
5	September 8	at San Diego Chargers	W 24–16	5–0	San Diego Stadium	42,007

== Regular season ==
=== Schedule ===
Week	Date	Opponent	Result	Record	Venue	Attendance
1	September 16	Oakland Raiders	**W** 24–16	1–0	Metropolitan Stadium	44,818
2	September 23	at **Chicago Bears**	**W** 22–13	2–0	Soldier Field	52,035
3	September 30	**Green Bay Packers**	**W** 11–3	3–0	Metropolitan Stadium	48,176
4	October 7	at **Detroit Lions**	**W** 23–9	4–0	Tiger Stadium	49,549
5	October 14	at San Francisco 49ers	**W** 17–13	5–0	Candlestick Park	56,438
6	October 21	Philadelphia Eagles	**W** 28–21	6–0	Metropolitan Stadium	47,478
7	October 28	Los Angeles Rams	**W** 10–9	7–0	Metropolitan Stadium	47,787
8	November 4	Cleveland Browns	**W** 26–3	8–0	Metropolitan Stadium	46,722
9	November 11	**Detroit Lions**	**W** 28–7	9–0	Metropolitan Stadium	47,911
10	November 19	at Atlanta Falcons	**L** 14–20	9–1	Atlanta Stadium	56,519
11	November 25	**Chicago Bears**	**W** 31–13	10–1	Metropolitan Stadium	46,430
12	December 2	at Cincinnati Bengals	**L** 0–27	10–2	Riverfront Stadium	57,859
13	December 8	at **Green Bay Packers**	**W** 31–7	11–2	Lambeau Field	53,830
14	December 16	at New York Giants	**W** 31–7	12–2	Yale Bowl	70,041

Notes

- Intra-division opponents are in **bold** text.

=== Game summaries ===
==== Week 1: vs. Oakland Raiders ====
Week 1: Oakland Raiders at Minnesota Vikings – Game summary

Quarter	1	2	3	4	Total
Raiders	0	13	3	0	**16**
**Vikings**	10	0	7	7	**24**

at Metropolitan Stadium, Bloomington, Minnesota

- Date: September 16
- Game time: 1:00 p.m. CDT
- Game weather: 50 °F (10 °C)
- Game attendance: 44,818
- Referee: Tommy Bell
- Pro-Football-Reference.com

Game information

**First quarter**

- MIN – Fred Cox 22-yard field goal. Vikings 3–0.
- MIN – John Gilliam 43-yard pass from Fran Tarkenton (Fred Cox kick). Vikings 10–0.

**Second quarter**

- OAK – George Blanda 16-yard field goal. Vikings 10–3.
- OAK – George Blanda 25-yard field goal. Vikings 10–6.
- OAK – George Atkinson 63-yard punt return (George Blanda kick). Raiders 13–10.

**Third quarter**

- OAK – George Blanda 9-yard field goal. Raiders 16–10.
- MIN – Chuck Foreman 9-yard pass from Fran Tarkenton (Fred Cox kick). Vikings 17–16.

**Fourth quarter**

- MIN – Bill Brown 6-yard run (Fred Cox kick). Vikings 24–16.

**Top passers**

- OAK – Daryle Lamonica – 13/30, 183 yards, 2 INT
- MIN – Fran Tarkenton – 13/31, 187 yards, 2 TD, INT

**Top rushers**

- OAK – Clarence Davis – 12 rushes, 73 yards
- MIN – Fran Tarkenton – 6 rushes, 27 yards

**Top receivers**

- OAK – Mike Siani – 6 receptions, 111 yards
- MIN – John Gilliam – 4 receptions, 90 yards, TD

==== Week 2: at Chicago Bears ====
Week 2: Minnesota Vikings at Chicago Bears – Game summary

Quarter	1	2	3	4	Total
**Vikings**	0	13	0	9	**22**
Bears	7	3	0	3	**13**

at Soldier Field, Chicago, Illinois

- Date: September 23
- Game time: 1:00 p.m. CDT
- Game weather: 61 °F (16 °C)
- Game attendance: 52,035
- Referee: Jim Tunney
- Pro-Football-Reference.com

Game information

**First quarter**

- CHI – Bobby Douglass 1-yard run (Mac Percival kick). Bears 7–0.

**Second quarter**

- CHI – Mac Percival 31-yard field goal. Bears 10–0.
- MIN – Fred Cox 41-yard field goal. Bears 10–3.
- MIN – John Beasley 3-yard pass from Fran Tarkenton (Fred Cox kick). Tied 10–10.
- MIN – Fred Cox 25-yard field goal. Vikings 13–10.

**Third quarter**

- None.

**Fourth quarter**

- MIN – Fred Cox 14-yard field goal. Vikings 16–10.
- MIN – Fred Cox 11-yard field goal. Vikings 19–10.
- CHI – Mac Percival 12-yard field goal. Vikings 19–13.
- MIN – Fred Cox 35-yard field goal. Vikings 22–13.

**Top passers**

- MIN – Fran Tarkenton – 12/18, 189 yards, TD
- CHI – Bobby Douglass – 10/19, 184 yards

**Top rushers**

- MIN – Chuck Foreman – 16 rushes, 116 yards
- CHI – Carl Garrett – 25 rushes, 90 yards

**Top receivers**

- MIN – Carroll Dale – 2 receptions, 53 yards
- CHI – Craig Cotton – 3 receptions, 88 yards

==== Week 3: vs. Green Bay Packers ====
Week 3: Green Bay Packers at Minnesota Vikings – Game summary

Quarter	1	2	3	4	Total
Packers	0	3	0	0	**3**
**Vikings**	0	5	3	3	**11**

at Metropolitan Stadium, Bloomington, Minnesota

- Date: September 30
- Game time: 1:00 p.m. CDT
- Game weather: 56 °F (13 °C)
- Game attendance: 48,176
- Referee: Fred Silva
- Pro-Football-Reference.com

Game information

**First quarter**

- None.

**Second quarter**

- GB – Chester Marcol 42-yard field goal. Packers 3–0.
- MIN – MacArthur Lane tackled in end zone for a safety. Packers 3–2.
- MIN – Fred Cox 22-yard field goal. Vikings 5–3.

**Third quarter**

- MIN – Fred Cox 13-yard field goal. Vikings 8–3.

**Fourth quarter**

- MIN – Fred Cox 14-yard field goal. Vikings 11–3.

**Top passers**

- GB – Scott Hunter – 3/6, 44 yards
- MIN – Fran Tarkenton – 12/16, 109 yards

**Top rushers**

- GB – John Brockington – 14 rushes, 58 yards
- MIN – Chuck Foreman – 16 rushes, 89 yards

**Top receivers**

- GB – MacArthur Lane – 3 receptions, 36 yards
- MIN – Chuck Foreman – 5 receptions, 62 yards

==== Week 4: at Detroit Lions ====
Week 4: Minnesota Vikings at Detroit Lions – Game summary

Quarter	1	2	3	4	Total
**Vikings**	14	6	0	3	**23**
Lions	3	3	3	0	**9**

at Tiger Stadium, Detroit, Michigan

- Date: October 7
- Game time: 3:00 p.m. CDT
- Game weather: 61 °F (16 °C)
- Game attendance: 49,549
- Referee: Bob Frederic
- Pro-Football-Reference.com

Game information

**First quarter**

- MIN – Ed Marinaro 12-yard pass from Fran Tarkenton (Fred Cox kick). Vikings 7–0.
- MIN – Ed Marinaro 8-yard pass from Fran Tarkenton (Fred Cox kick). Vikings 14–0.
- DET – Errol Mann 37-yard field goal. Vikings 14–3.

**Second quarter**

- DET – Errol Mann 15-yard field goal. Vikings 14–6.
- MIN – Fred Cox 38-yard field goal. Vikings 17–6.
- MIN – Fred Cox 37-yard field goal. Vikings 20–6.

**Third quarter**

- DET – Errol Mann 33-yard field goal. Vikings 20–9.

**Fourth quarter**

- MIN – Fred Cox 27-yard field goal. Vikings 23–9.

**Top passers**

- MIN – Fran Tarkenton – 17/24, 199 yards, 2 TD
- DET – Greg Landry – 14/24, 110 yards

**Top rushers**

- MIN – Chuck Foreman – 16 rushes, 114 yards
- DET – Mel Farr – 11 rushes, 52 yards

**Top receivers**

- MIN – John Gilliam – 5 receptions, 79 yards
- DET – Mel Farr – 11 receptions, 85 yards

==== Week 5: at San Francisco 49ers ====
Week 5: Minnesota Vikings at San Francisco 49ers – Game summary

Quarter	1	2	3	4	Total
**Vikings**	7	7	0	3	**17**
49ers	3	3	7	0	**13**

at Candlestick Park, San Francisco, California

- Date: October 14
- Game time: 3:00 p.m. CDT
- Game weather: 64 °F (18 °C)
- Game attendance: 56,438
- Referee: Norm Schachter
- Pro-Football-Reference.com

Game information

**First quarter**

- MIN – John Gilliam 12-yard pass from Fran Tarkenton (Fred Cox kick). Vikings 7–0.
- SF – Bruce Gossett 28-yard field goal. Vikings 7–3.

**Second quarter**

- MIN – Chuck Foreman 1-yard run (Fred Cox kick). Vikings 14–3.
- SF – Bruce Gossett 41-yard field goal. Vikings 14–6.

**Third quarter**

- SF – Ken Willard 7-yard pass from Steve Spurrier (Bruce Gossett kick). Vikings 14–13.

**Fourth quarter**

- MIN – Fred Cox 22-yard field goal. Vikings 17–13.

**Top passers**

- MIN – Fran Tarkenton – 10/22, 136 yards, TD
- SF – Steve Spurrier – 31/48, 320 yards, TD

**Top rushers**

- MIN – Chuck Foreman – 22 rushes, 71 yards, TD
- SF – Ken Willard – 10 rushes, 52 yards

**Top receivers**

- MIN – John Gilliam – 7 receptions, 107 yards, TD
- SF – Gene Washington – 8 receptions, 118 yards

==== Week 6: vs. Philadelphia Eagles ====
Week 6: Philadelphia Eagles at Minnesota Vikings – Game summary

Quarter	1	2	3	4	Total
Eagles	0	7	7	7	**21**
**Vikings**	7	7	7	7	**28**

at Metropolitan Stadium, Bloomington, Minnesota

- Date: October 21
- Game time: 1:00 p.m. CDT
- Game weather: 54 °F (12 °C)
- Game attendance: 47,478
- Referee: Jack Reader
- Pro-Football-Reference.com

Game information

**First quarter**

- MIN – John Gilliam 44-yard run (Fred Cox kick). Vikings 7–0.

**Second quarter**

- MIN – Oscar Reed 1-yard run (Fred Cox kick). Vikings 14–0.
- PHI – Po James 12-yard run (Tom Dempsey kick). Vikings 14–7.

**Third quarter**

- MIN – John Gilliam 24-yard pass from Fran Tarkenton (Fred Cox kick). Vikings 21–7.
- PHI – Lee Bouggess 2-yard run (Tom Dempsey kick). Vikings 21–14.

**Fourth quarter**

- MIN – Chuck Foreman 5-yard run (Fred Cox kick). Vikings 28–14.
- PHI – Charle Young 17-yard run (Tom Dempsey kick). Vikings 28–21.

**Top passers**

- PHI – Roman Gabriel – 23/32, 201 yards
- MIN – Fran Tarkenton – 16/21, 202 yards, TD

**Top rushers**

- PHI – Po James – 11 rushes, 78 yards, TD
- MIN – Chuck Foreman – 21 rushes, 68 yards, TD

**Top receivers**

- PHI – Charle Young – 6 receptions, 86 yards
- MIN – John Gilliam – 6 receptions, 116 yards, TD

==== Week 7: vs. Los Angeles Rams ====
Week 7: Los Angeles Rams at Minnesota Vikings – Game summary

Quarter	1	2	3	4	Total
Rams	0	3	3	3	**9**
**Vikings**	3	7	0	0	**10**

at Metropolitan Stadium, Bloomington, Minnesota

- Date: October 28
- Game time: 1:00 p.m. CST
- Game weather: 41 °F (5 °C)
- Game attendance: 47,787
- Referee: Ben Dreith
- Pro-Football-Reference.com

Game information

**First quarter**

- MIN – Fred Cox 15-yard field goal. Vikings 3–0.

**Second quarter**

- MIN – Chuck Foreman 9-yard pass from Fran Tarkenton (Fred Cox kick). Vikings 10–0.
- LA – David Ray 30-yard field goal. Vikings 10–3.

**Third quarter**

- LA – David Ray 35-yard field goal. Vikings 10–6.

**Fourth quarter**

- LA – David Ray 47-yard field goal. Vikings 10–9.

**Top passers**

- LA – John Hadl – 10/20, 87 yards
- MIN – Fran Tarkenton – 8/16, 91 yards, TD

**Top rushers**

- LA – Larry Smith – 16 rushes, 63 yards
- MIN – Chuck Foreman – 23 rushes, 86 yards

**Top receivers**

- LA – Jim Bertelsen – 4 receptions, 41 yards
- MIN – Stu Voigt – 3 receptions, 40 yards

==== Week 8: vs. Cleveland Browns ====
Week 8: Cleveland Browns at Minnesota Vikings – Game summary

Quarter	1	2	3	4	Total
Browns	3	0	0	0	**3**
**Vikings**	3	6	7	10	**26**

at Metropolitan Stadium, Bloomington, Minnesota

- Date: November 4
- Game time: 1:00 p.m. CST
- Game weather: 27 °F (−3 °C)
- Game attendance: 46,722
- Referee: Dick Jorgensen
- Pro-Football-Reference.com

Game information

**First quarter**

- CLE – Don Cockroft 27-yard field goal. Browns 3–0.
- MIN – Fred Cox 16-yard field goal. Tied 3–3.

**Second quarter**

- MIN – Fred Cox 23-yard field goal. Vikings 6–3.
- MIN – Fred Cox 33-yard field goal. Vikings 9–3.

**Third quarter**

- MIN – Oscar Reed 3-yard run (Fred Cox kick). Vikings 16–3.

**Fourth quarter**

- MIN – Stu Voigt 7-yard pass from Fran Tarkenton (Fred Cox kick). Vikings 23–3.
- MIN – Fred Cox 41-yard field goal. Vikings 26–3.

**Top passers**

- CLE – Mike Phipps – 10/20, 82 yards
- MIN – Fran Tarkenton – 13/22, 166 yards, TD

**Top rushers**

- CLE – Ken Brown – 7 rushes, 25 yards
- MIN – Oscar Reed – 22 rushes, 79 yards, TD

**Top receivers**

- CLE – Frank Pitts – 4 receptions, 36 yards
- MIN – Ed Marinaro – 6 receptions, 65 yards

==== Week 9: vs. Detroit Lions ====
Week 9: Detroit Lions at Minnesota Vikings – Game summary

Quarter	1	2	3	4	Total
Lions	7	0	0	0	**7**
**Vikings**	7	7	14	0	**28**

at Metropolitan Stadium, Bloomington, Minnesota

- Date: November 11
- Game time: 1:00 p.m. CST
- Game weather: 39 °F (4 °C)
- Game attendance: 47,911
- Referee: Tommy Bell
- Pro-Football-Reference.com

Game information

**First quarter**

- DET – Ron Jessie 33-yard pass from Bill Munson (Jim O'Brien kick). Lions 7–0.
- MIN – Bill Brown 1-yard run (Fred Cox kick). Tied 7–7.

**Second quarter**

- MIN – Wally Hilgenberg 2-yard fumble return (Fred Cox kick). Vikings 14–7.

**Third quarter**

- MIN – Ed Marinaro 7-yard run (Fred Cox kick). Vikings 21–7.
- MIN – John Gilliam 33-yard pass from Fran Tarkenton (Fred Cox kick). Vikings 28–7.

**Fourth quarter**

- None.

**Top passers**

- DET – Bill Munson – 16/34, 152 yards, TD
- MIN – Fran Tarkenton – 11/15, 177 yards, TD

**Top rushers**

- DET – Altie Taylor – 9 rushes, 49 yards
- MIN – Bill Brown – 19 rushes, 101 yards, TD

**Top receivers**

- DET – Ron Jessie – 5 receptions, 71 yards, TD
- MIN – John Gilliam – 5 receptions, 129 yards, TD

==== Week 10: at Atlanta Falcons ====
Week 10: Minnesota Vikings at Atlanta Falcons – Game summary

Quarter	1	2	3	4	Total
Vikings	0	7	0	7	**14**
**Falcons**	0	17	3	0	**20**

at Atlanta Stadium, Atlanta, Georgia

- Date: Monday, November 19
- Game time: 8:00 p.m. CST
- Game weather: 57 °F (14 °C)
- Game attendance: 56,519
- Referee: Fred Swearingen
- Pro-Football-Reference.com

Game information

**First quarter**

- None.

**Second quarter**

- ATL – Nick Mike-Mayer 25-yard field goal. Falcons 3–0.
- MIN – John Gilliam 39-yard pass from Fran Tarkenton (Fred Cox kick). Vikings 7–3.
- ATL – Dave Hampton 19-yard pass from Bob Lee (Nick Mike-Mayer kick). Falcons 10–7.
- ATL – Eddie Ray 39-yard pass from Bob Lee (Nick Mike-Mayer kick). Falcons 17–7.

**Third quarter**

- ATL – Nick Mike-Mayer 49-yard field goal. Falcons 20–7.

**Fourth quarter**

- MIN – Bill Brown 2-yard pass from Fran Tarkenton (Fred Cox kick). Vikings 20–14.

**Top passers**

- MIN – Fran Tarkenton – 17/30, 214 yards, 2 TD
- ATL – Bob Lee – 11/23, 171 yards, 2 TD

**Top rushers**

- MIN – Chuck Foreman – 9 rushes, 38 yards
- ATL – Dave Hampton – 23 rushes, 108 yards

**Top receivers**

- MIN – John Gilliam – 4 receptions, 97 yards, TD
- ATL – Dave Hampton – 3 receptions, 55 yards, TD

==== Week 11: vs. Chicago Bears ====
Week 11: Chicago Bears at Minnesota Vikings – Game summary

Quarter	1	2	3	4	Total
Bears	3	0	3	7	**13**
**Vikings**	3	7	14	7	**31**

at Metropolitan Stadium, Bloomington, Minnesota

- Date: November 25
- Game time: 1:00 p.m. CST
- Game weather: 36 °F (2 °C)
- Game attendance: 46,430
- Referee: Fred Wyant
- Pro-Football-Reference.com

Game information

**First quarter**

- MIN – Fred Cox 41-yard field goal. Vikings 3–0.
- CHI – Mirro Roder 43-yard field goal. Tied 3–3.

**Second quarter**

- MIN – Chuck Foreman 2-yard run (Fred Cox kick). Vikings 10–3.

**Third quarter**

- CHI – Mirro Roder 24-yard field goal. Vikings 10–6.
- MIN – John Gilliam 54-yard pass from Fran Tarkenton (Fred Cox kick). Vikings 17–6.
- MIN – Fran Tarkenton 8-yard run (Fred Cox kick). Vikings 24–6.

**Fourth quarter**

- MIN – John Gilliam 30-yard pass from Bob Berry (Fred Cox kick). Vikings 31–6.
- CHI – Earl Thomas 29-yard pass from Gary Huff (Mirro Roder kick). Vikings 31–13.

**Top passers**

- CHI – Gary Huff – 6/8, 65 yards, TD
- MIN – Fran Tarkenton – 11/15, 161 yards, TD

**Top rushers**

- CHI – Joe Moore – 24 rushes, 75 yards
- MIN – Oscar Reed – 12 rushes, 97 yards

**Top receivers**

- CHI – Earl Thomas – 3 receptions, 43 yards, TD
- MIN – John Gilliam – 5 receptions, 139 yards, 2 TD

The day of this game was declared "Karl Kassulke Day" in honor of former Viking safety Karl Kassulke, who was left paralyzed in a motorcycle accident just before the beginning of training camp. Kassulke, using a wheelchair, attended the game and shook hands with the players on the field at halftime.

==== Week 12: at Cincinnati Bengals ====
Week 12: Minnesota Vikings at Cincinnati Bengals – Game summary

Quarter	1	2	3	4	Total
Vikings	0	0	0	0	**0**
**Bengals**	0	10	10	7	**27**

at Riverfront Stadium, Cincinnati, Ohio

- Date: December 2
- Game time: 1:00 p.m. CST
- Game weather: 42 °F (6 °C)
- Game attendance: 57,859
- Referee: Pat Haggerty
- Pro-Football-Reference.com

Game information

**First quarter**

- None.

**Second quarter**

- CIN – Horst Muhlmann 22-yard field goal. Bengals 3–0.
- CIN – Lemar Parrish 23-yard fumble return (Horst Muhlmann kick). Bengals 10–0.

**Third quarter**

- CIN – Essex Johnson 40-yard run (Horst Muhlmann kick). Bengals 17–0.
- CIN – Horst Muhlmann 38-yard field goal. Bengals 20–0.

**Fourth quarter**

- CIN – Bob Trumpy 7-yard pass from Ken Anderson (Horst Muhlmann kick). Bengals 27–0.

**Top passers**

- MIN – Fran Tarkenton – 11/18, 73 yards
- CIN – Ken Anderson – 12/17, 105 yards, TD

**Top rushers**

- MIN – Chuck Foreman – 11 rushes, 38 yards
- CIN – Essex Johnson – 9 rushes, 79 yards, TD

**Top receivers**

- MIN – Oscar Reed – 5 receptions, 30 yards
- CIN – Bob Trumpy – 4 receptions, 37 yards, TD

This was the Vikings' first shutout loss since 1962 and the first shutout loss on the road in their history.

==== Week 13: at Green Bay Packers ====
Week 13: Minnesota Vikings at Green Bay Packers – Game summary

Quarter	1	2	3	4	Total
**Vikings**	14	14	3	0	**31**
Packers	0	0	0	7	**7**

at Lambeau Field, Green Bay, Wisconsin

- Date: December 8
- Game time: 12:00 p.m. CST
- Game weather: 26 °F (−3 °C)
- Game attendance: 53,830
- Referee: Norm Schachter
- Pro-Football-Reference.com

Game information

**First quarter**

- MIN – Stu Voigt 21-yard pass from Fran Tarkenton (Fred Cox kick). Vikings 7–0.
- MIN – Bobby Bryant 46-yard interception return (Fred Cox kick). Vikings 14–0.

**Second quarter**

- MIN – Chuck Foreman 50-yard run (Fred Cox kick). Vikings 21–0.
- MIN – John Gilliam 20-yard pass from Fran Tarkenton (Fred Cox kick). Vikings 28–0.

**Third quarter**

- MIN – Fred Cox 15-yard field goal. Vikings 31–0.

**Fourth quarter**

- GB – Barry Smith 17-yard pass from Jim Del Gaizo (Chester Marcol kick). Vikings 31–7.

**Top passers**

- MIN – Fran Tarkenton – 8/12, 79 yards, 2 TD
- GB – Jerry Tagge – 10/25, 98 yards

**Top rushers**

- MIN – Chuck Foreman – 19 rushes, 100 yards, TD
- GB – John Brockington – 27 rushes, 124 yards

**Top receivers**

- MIN – John Gilliam – 2 receptions, 33 yards, TD
- GB – Barry Smith – 4 receptions, 55 yards, TD

==== Week 14: at New York Giants ====
Week 14: Minnesota Vikings at New York Giants – Game summary

Quarter	1	2	3	4	Total
**Vikings**	7	10	0	14	**31**
Giants	0	0	0	7	**7**

at Yale Bowl, New Haven, Connecticut

- Date: December 16
- Game time: 12:00 p.m. CST
- Game weather: 30 °F (−1 °C)
- Game attendance: 70,041
- Referee: John McDonough
- Pro-Football-Reference.com

Game information

**First quarter**

- MIN – Oscar Reed 9-yard run (Fred Cox kick). Vikings 7–0.

**Second quarter**

- MIN – Fred Cox 22-yard field goal. Vikings 10–0.
- MIN – Terry Brown 63-yard interception return (Fred Cox kick). Vikings 17–0.

**Third quarter**

- None.

**Fourth quarter**

- MIN – Bill Brown 1-yard run (Fred Cox kick). Vikings 24–0.
- NYG – Ron Johnson 16-yard pass from Randy Johnson (Pete Gogolak kick). Vikings 24–7.
- MIN – Ed Marinaro 1-yard run (Fred Cox kick). Vikings 31–7.

**Top passers**

- MIN – Fran Tarkenton – 10/14, 130 yards
- NYG – Randy Johnson – 5/13, 89 yards, TD

**Top rushers**

- MIN – Dave Osborn – 9 rushes, 72 yards
- NYG – Ron Johnson – 23 rushes, 90 yards

**Top receivers**

- MIN – Chuck Foreman – 2 receptions, 28 yards
- NYG – Bob Grim – 2 receptions, 54 yards

=== Standings ===
NFC Central
	W	L	T	PCT	DIV	CONF	PF	PA	STK
Minnesota Vikings	12	2	0	.857	6–0	10–1	296	168	W2
Detroit Lions	6	7	1	.464	3–2–1	6–4–1	271	247	L1
Green Bay Packers	5	7	2	.429	1–4–1	4–6–1	202	259	W1
Chicago Bears	3	11	0	.214	1–5	1–9	195	334	L6

== Playoffs ==
=== Schedule ===
Week	Date	Opponent	Result	Record	Venue	Attendance
Divisional	December 22, 1973	Washington Redskins	W 27–20	1–0	Metropolitan Stadium	45,475
Conference	December 30, 1973	at Dallas Cowboys	W 27–10	2–0	Texas Stadium	60,272
Super Bowl VIII	January 13, 1974	Miami Dolphins	L 7–24	2–1	Rice Stadium	71,882

=== Game summaries ===
==== NFC Divisional Playoff: vs. Washington Redskins ====
NFC Divisional Playoff: Washington Redskins at Minnesota Vikings – Game summary

Quarter	1	2	3	4	Total
Redskins	0	7	3	10	20
Vikings	0	3	7	17	27

at Metropolitan Stadium, Bloomington, Minnesota

- Date: December 22
- Game time: 1:00 p.m.
- Game weather: 19 °F (−7 °C)
- Referee: Jim Tunney
- TV announcers (CBS): Wayne Walker, Tommy Mason, Jack Whitaker, Bruce Roberts (field)
- Pro-Football-Reference.com

Game information

First quarter

- None.

Second quarter

- MIN – Fred Cox 19-yard field goal. Vikings 3–0.
- WAS – Larry Brown 3-yard run (Curt Knight kick). Redskins 7–3.

Third quarter

- MIN – Bill Brown 2-yard run (Fred Cox kick). Vikings 10–7.
- WAS – Curt Knight 52-yard field goal. Tied 10–10.

Fourth quarter

- WAS – Curt Knight 42-yard field goal. Redskins 13–10.
- MIN – John Gilliam 28-yard pass from Fran Tarkenton (Fred Cox kick). Vikings 17–13.
- MIN – John Gilliam 6-yard pass from Fran Tarkenton (Fred Cox kick). Vikings 24–13.
- WAS – Roy Jefferson 28-yard pass from Billy Kilmer (Curt Knight kick). Vikings 24–20.
- MIN – Fred Cox 30-yard field goal. Vikings 27–20.

Top passers

- WAS – Billy Kilmer – 13/24, 159 yards, TD
- MIN – Fran Tarkenton – 16/28, 222 yards, 2 TD

Top rushers

- WAS – Larry Brown – 29 rushes, 115 yards, TD
- MIN – Oscar Reed – 17 rushes, 95 yards

Top receivers

- WAS – Roy Jefferson – 6 receptions, 84 yards, TD
- MIN – Oscar Reed – 5 receptions, 76 yards

Minnesota scored 17 points in the fourth quarter to overcome a 13–10 deficit, including two touchdowns in a span of 1:05.

Both offenses struggled in the first quarter. The Vikings were completely unable to move the ball, finishing the quarter without any first downs, while Washington kicker Curt Knight missed two field goal attempts. One miss was from 49 yards and the other from 17, spoiling an impressive drive that saw the Redskins drive from their own 14 to inside the Vikings 10-yard line.

Minnesota finally managed to get rolling in the second quarter, with a 50-yard completion from Tarkenton to running back Oscar Reed setting up Fred Cox's 19-yard field goal. But with 3:30 left in the half, Vikings defensive back Bobby Bryant fumbled a punt return that was recovered by Redskins running back Bob Brunet on the Minnesota 21-yard line. Billy Kilmer then completed a 17-yard pass to Charley Taylor before Larry Brown scored on a 3-yard touchdown run to give the Redskins a 7–3 lead. Minnesota responded with a drive into field goal range, but Mike Bass intercepted a pass from Tarkenton to maintain Washington's lead going into halftime.

The Vikings then took the opening kickoff of the second half and marched 79 yards, including a 46-yard run by Reed, to score on fullback Bill Brown's 2-yard rushing touchdown. To make matters worse for Washington, star cornerback Pat Fischer suffered cracked ribs on the drive and was replaced by Speedy Duncan, an 11-year veteran who normally only played as a kick returner. Still, the Redskins managed to take back the lead with Knight's two third-quarter field goals, first tying a playoff record from 52 yards, and the second from 46 yards on the first play of the fourth quarter.

Now facing a 13–10 fourth-quarter deficit, the Vikings stormed back with two quick touchdowns. First they drove 71 yards in 8 plays to score on Tarkenton's pass to John Gilliam, who beat single coverage by Duncan for a 28-yard touchdown catch. Then on the first play of Washington's ensuing drive, Nate Wright intercepted a pass from Kilmer and returned it 26 yards to the Redskins 8-yard line, setting up a 6-yard touchdown pass from Tarkenton to Gilliam that made the score 24–13. With 5:28 left, Washington got back to within four points, getting good field position due to Ken Stone blocking a Vikings punt and converting it into Kilmer's 28-yard touchdown pass to Roy Jefferson. But the Vikings managed to burn up 4 minutes with their ensuing drive, finishing it off with a 30-yard Cox field goal that gave them a 27–20 lead. The Redskins had less than two minutes to drive for a tying touchdown, and ended up turning the ball over on downs at the Vikings 42-yard line.

Tarkenton completed 16/28 passes for 222 yards and two touchdowns, with one interception. Reed had 17 carries for 95 yards and caught four passes for 76. Brown rushed for 115 yards and a touchdown, while also catching two passes for 13 yards.

"Sometimes they’re not concentrating on me," said Oscar Reed, in reference to his big plays in the game. "Since early in the season they've been keying on Chuck Foreman. I'm not the world's greatest pass catcher or runner, but given a little room, I'll use what I've got."

==== NFC Championship Game: at Dallas Cowboys ====
NFC Championship Game: Minnesota Vikings at Dallas Cowboys – Game summary

Quarter	1	2	3	4	Total
Vikings	3	7	7	10	27
Cowboys	0	0	10	0	10

at Texas Stadium, Irving, Texas

- Date: December 30
- Game time: 1:00 p.m.
- Game weather: 48 °F (9 °C)
- Referee: Norm Schachter
- TV: CBS
- Pro-Football-Reference.com

Game information

First quarter

- MIN – Fred Cox 44-yard field goal. Vikings 3–0.

Second quarter

- MIN – Chuck Foreman 5-yard run (Fred Cox kick). Vikings 10–0.

Third quarter

- DAL – Golden Richards 63-yard punt return (Toni Fritsch kick). Vikings 10–7.
- MIN – John Gilliam 54-yard pass from Fran Tarkenton (Fred Cox kick). Vikings 17–7.
- DAL – Toni Fritsch 17-yard field goal. Vikings 17–10.

Fourth quarter

- MIN – Bobby Bryant 63-yard interception return (Fred Cox kick). Vikings 24–10.
- MIN – Fred Cox 34-yard field goal. Vikings 27–10.

Top passers

- MIN – Fran Tarkenton – 10/21, 133 yards, TD
- DAL – Roger Staubach – 10/21, 89 yards

Top rushers

- MIN – Chuck Foreman – 19 rushes, 76 yards, TD
- DAL – Robert Newhouse – 14 rushes, 50 yards

Top receivers

- MIN – John Gilliam – 2 receptions, 63 yards, TD
- DAL – Bob Hayes – 2 receptions, 25 yards

The Vikings forced four interceptions and recovered two fumbles in the second half while also holding Dallas to 152 total yards en route to a 27–10 victory over the Cowboys.

With the loss of running back Calvin Hill and defensive tackle Bob Lilly to injuries, Dallas' offense could not get anything going. Minnesota jumped to a 10–0 lead by halftime with a Fred Cox field goal and an 86-yard drive that ended with a 5-yard rushing touchdown by Chuck Foreman. The touchdown drive included Fran Tarkenton's completions to tight end Stu Voigt for gains of 16 and 7 yards, a 2-yard run by Foreman on 4th-and-1, and a 12-yard scramble by Tarkenton himself.

What followed would be an amazingly sloppy second half in which both teams combined for 10 turnovers. Three minutes into the third quarter, Dallas quarterback Roger Staubach threw an interception to Bobby Bryant on the Vikings 2-yard line. But the Cowboys defense forced a punt and Golden Richards returned it 63 yards for a touchdown, cutting the score to 10–7. Tarkenton quickly struck back, throwing a 54-yard touchdown pass to John Gilliam, who managed to outrun single coverage by Cowboys future Hall of Fame defensive back Mel Renfro. Dallas responded with Toni Fritsch's 17-yard field goal which cut the lead to 17–10.

Then a wave of turnovers began. On the ensuing possession, Dallas got a huge opportunity to score when Charlie Waters forced a fumble from Foreman that safety Cliff Harris recovered on the Minnesota 37. However, the Vikings took the ball right back when Staubach threw a pass that was deflected into the arms of linebacker Jeff Siemon. An even better scoring chance awaited the Cowboys at the end of the Vikings' next drive, as Tarkenton threw an interception to Waters on the Minnesota 24. But Dallas fared no better this time, losing the ball again when Jim Marshall knocked it out of Staubach's hand as he wound up for a pass, and defensive lineman Gary Larsen recovered it. The offensive futility continued with Minnesota, as their next drive ended with a fumbled handoff exchange between Tarkenton and Foreman that Dallas lineman Larry Cole recovered on the Vikings 47-yard line.

A few plays later, Dallas faced 3rd-and-3 with 9 minutes left in the fourth quarter. Staubach attempted a pass to Bob Hayes near the right sideline, but Bryant intercepted the pass and raced 63 yards for a touchdown that put the Vikings up 24–10. Then on Dallas' next drive, Staubach tried to connect with Drew Pearson, but a devastating hit by Nate Wright caused the ball to bounce off his hands and into the arms of defensive back Jeff Wright, who returned the ball 13 yards to set up Cox's 34-yard game clinching field goal.

Both teams combined for a net total of just 163 passing yards. Tarkenton completed only 10/21 passes for 133 yards and a touchdown with one interception, while also rushing for 16 yards. Staubach had one of the worst postseason performances of his career, completing just 10/21 passes for 89 yards and throwing four interceptions, though he did rush for 30 yards. Foreman was the top offensive performer of the day with 76 rushing yards and four receptions for 28, while fullback Oscar Reed added 18 carries for 75 yards and an 8-yard catch.

==== Super Bowl VIII: vs. Miami Dolphins ====
Super Bowl VIII: Minnesota Vikings vs. Miami Dolphins – Game summary

Quarter	1	2	3	4	Total
Vikings (NFC)	0	0	0	7	7
Dolphins (AFC)	14	3	7	0	24

at Rice Stadium, Houston, Texas

- Date: January 13
- Game time: 3:50 p.m. EST/2:50 p.m. CST
- Game weather: 47 °F (8 °C)
- Game attendance: 71,882
- Referee: Ben Dreith
- TV announcers (CBS): Ray Scott, Pat Summerall and Bart Starr
- Pro Football Reference.com

Game information

First quarter

- MIA – Larry Csonka 5-yard run (Garo Yepremian kick). Dolphins 7–0.
- MIA – Jim Kiick 1-yard run (Garo Yepremian kick). Dolphins 14–0.

Second quarter

- MIA – Garo Yepremian 28-yard field goal. Dolphins 17–0.

Third quarter

- MIA – Larry Csonka 2-yard run (Garo Yepremian kick). Dolphins 24–0.

Fourth quarter

- MIN – Fran Tarkenton 4-yard run (Fred Cox kick). Dolphins 24–7.

Top passers

- MIN – Fran Tarkenton – 18/28, 182 yards
- MIA – Bob Griese – 6/7, 73 yards

Top rushers

- MIN – Oscar Reed – 11 rushes, 32 yards
- MIA – Larry Csonka – 33 rushes, 145 yards, 2 TD

Top receivers

- MIN – Stu Voigt – 3 receptions, 46 yards
- MIA – Paul Warfield – 2 receptions, 33 yards

== Statistics ==
=== Team leaders ===
Category	Player(s)	Value
Passing yards	Fran Tarkenton	2,113
Passing touchdowns	Fran Tarkenton	15
Rushing yards	Chuck Foreman	801
Rushing touchdowns	Chuck Foreman	4
Receiving yards	John Gilliam	907
Receiving touchdowns	John Gilliam	8
Points	Fred Cox	96
Kickoff return yards	Brent McClanahan	410
Punt return yards	Bobby Bryant	140
Interceptions	Bobby Bryant	7

=== League rankings ===
Category	Total yards	Yards per game	NFL rank (out of 26)
Passing offense	1,956	139.7	14th
Rushing offense	2,275	162.5	6th
Total offense	4,231	302.2	7th
Passing defense	1,894	135.3	12th
Rushing defense	1,974	141.0	11th
Total defense	3,868	276.3	12th
