= 1973–74 NFL playoffs =

American football tournament

- Dates: December 22, 1973–January 13, 1974
- Season: 1973
- Teams: 8
- Games played: 7
- Super Bowl VIII site: Rice Stadium; Houston, Texas
- Defending champions: Miami Dolphins
- Champion: Miami Dolphins (2nd title)
- Runner-up: Minnesota Vikings
- Conference runners-up: Dallas Cowboys; Oakland Raiders
NFL playoffs
← 1972–73	1974–75 →

The National Football League playoffs for the 1973 season began on December 22, 1973. The postseason tournament concluded with the Miami Dolphins defeating the Minnesota Vikings in Super Bowl VIII, 24–7, on January 13, 1974, at Rice Stadium in Houston, Texas.

Like the previous NFL seasons, the home teams in the playoffs were decided based on a yearly divisional rotation, excluding the wild card teams who would always play on the road.

This was the first NFL postseason in which none of the twelve "old guard" NFL teams played in the conference championship games.

== Participants ==
Within each conference, the three division winners and the non-division winner with the best overall regular season record of all remaining teams in the conference qualified for the playoffs. The NFL did not use a seeding system until the 1975 season, and instead home teams during the first two rounds of the playoffs alternated by division. Thus, it is possible that a team could host another club with a better regular season record. For the Super Bowl, the championship round was played at a neutral site, the designated home team was based on an annual rotation by conference.

Playoff participants
	AFC	NFC
East winner	Miami Dolphins	Dallas Cowboys
Central winner	Cincinnati Bengals	Minnesota Vikings
West winner	Oakland Raiders	Los Angeles Rams
Wild card	Pittsburgh Steelers	Washington Redskins

== Bracket ==
Note: Prior to the 1975 season, the home teams in the playoffs were decided based on a yearly rotation. Had the 1973 playoffs been seeded, the AFC divisional matchups would have been #3 Oakland at #2 Cincinnati and #4 wild card Pittsburgh at #1 Miami; the NFC matchups would not have changed, although #3 Dallas would have had to travel to #2 Los Angeles, and #1 Minnesota would have had home field for the NFC championship game.

Dec 22 – Metropolitan Stadium
WC	Washington	20
Dec 30 – Texas Stadium
Cent.	Minnesota	27
NFC
Cent.	Minnesota	27
Dec 23 – Texas Stadium
East	Dallas	10
NFC Championship
West	Los Angeles	16
Jan 13 – Rice Stadium
East	Dallas	27
Divisional round
NFC	Minnesota	7
Dec 22 – Oakland Coliseum
AFC	Miami	24
Super Bowl VIII
WC	Pittsburgh	14
Dec 30 – Miami Orange Bowl
West	Oakland	33
AFC
West	Oakland	10
Dec 23 – Miami Orange Bowl
East	Miami	27
AFC Championship
Cent.	Cincinnati	16
East	Miami	34

== Schedule ==
In the United States, NBC broadcast the AFC playoff games, while CBS televised the NFC games and Super Bowl VIII.

Round	Away team	Score	Home team	Date	Kickoff (ET / UTC−5)	TV
Divisional round	Washington Redskins	20–27	Minnesota Vikings	December 22, 1973	1:00 p.m.	CBS
Divisional round	Pittsburgh Steelers	14–33	Oakland Raiders	December 22, 1973	4:00 p.m.	NBC
Divisional round	Cincinnati Bengals	16–34	Miami Dolphins	December 23, 1973	1:00 p.m.	NBC
Divisional round	Los Angeles Rams	16–27	Dallas Cowboys	December 23, 1973	4:00 p.m.	CBS
Conference championships	Minnesota Vikings	27–10	Dallas Cowboys	December 30, 1973	1:00 p.m.	CBS
Conference championships	Oakland Raiders	10–27	Miami Dolphins	December 30, 1973	4:00 p.m.	NBC
Super Bowl VIII Rice Stadium Houston, Texas	Minnesota Vikings	7–24	Miami Dolphins	January 13, 1974	3:30 p.m.	CBS

== Divisional round ==
=== Saturday, December 22, 1973 ===
==== NFC: Minnesota Vikings 27, Washington Redskins 20 ====
Washington Redskins vs. Minnesota Vikings – Game summary

Quarter	1	2	3	4	Total
Redskins	0	7	3	10	20
Vikings	0	3	7	17	27

at Metropolitan Stadium, Bloomington, Minnesota

- Game time: 1:00 p.m. EST
- Game attendance: 48,040
- Referee: Jim Tunney
- TV announcers (CBS): Jack Whitaker, Wayne Walker, Tommy Mason, Bruce Roberts (field)
- Boxscore

Game information

First quarter

- None.

Second quarter

- MIN – Fred Cox 19-yard field goal. Vikings 3–0.
- WAS – Larry Brown 3-yard run (Curt Knight kick). Redskins 7–3.

Third quarter

- MIN – Bill Brown 2-yard run (Fred Cox kick). Vikings 10–7.
- WAS – Curt Knight 52-yard field goal. Tied 10–10.

Fourth quarter

- WAS – Curt Knight 42-yard field goal. Redskins 13–10.
- MIN – John Gilliam 28-yard pass from Fran Tarkenton (Fred Cox kick). Vikings 17–13.
- MIN – John Gilliam 6-yard pass from Fran Tarkenton (Fred Cox kick). Vikings 24–13.
- WAS – Roy Jefferson 28-yard pass from Billy Kilmer (Curt Knight kick). Vikings 24–20.
- MIN – Fred Cox 30-yard field goal. Vikings 27–20.

Top passers

- WAS – Billy Kilmer – 13/24, 159 yards, TD
- MIN – Fran Tarkenton – 16/28, 222 yards, 2 TD

Top rushers

- WAS – Larry Brown – 29 rushes, 115 yards, TD
- MIN – Oscar Reed – 17 rushes, 95 yards

Top receivers

- WAS – Roy Jefferson – 6 receptions, 84 yards, TD
- MIN – Oscar Reed – 5 receptions, 76 yards

Minnesota scored 17 points in the fourth quarter to overcome a 13–10 deficit, including two touchdowns in a span of 1:05.

Both offenses struggled in the first quarter. The Vikings were completely unable to move the ball, finishing the quarter without any first downs, while Washington kicker Curt Knight missed two field goal attempts. One miss was from 49 yards and the other from 17, spoiling an impressive drive that saw the Redskins drive from their own 14 to inside the Vikings 10-yard line.

Minnesota finally managed to get rolling in the second quarter, with a 50-yard completion from Tarkenton to running back Oscar Reed setting up Fred Cox's 19-yard field goal. But with 3:30 left in the half, Vikings cornerback Bobby Bryant fumbled a punt return that was recovered by Redskins running back Bob Brunet on the Minnesota 21-yard line. Billy Kilmer then completed a 17-yard pass to Charley Taylor before Larry Brown scored on a 3-yard touchdown run to give the Redskins a 7–3 lead. Minnesota responded with a drive into field goal range, but Mike Bass intercepted a pass from Tarkenton to maintain Washington's lead going into halftime.

The Vikings then took the opening kickoff of the second half and marched 79 yards, including a 46-yard run by Reed, to score on fullback Bill Brown's 2-yard rushing touchdown. To make matters worse for Washington, star cornerback Pat Fischer suffered cracked ribs on the drive and was replaced by Speedy Duncan, an 11-year veteran who normally only played as a kick returner. Still, the Redskins managed to take back the lead with Knight's two third quarter field goals, first tying a playoff record from 52 yards, and the second from 46 yards on the first play of the fourth quarter.

Now facing a 13–10 fourth quarter deficit, the Vikings stormed back with two quick touchdowns. First they drove 71 yards in 8 plays to score on Tarkenton's pass to John Gilliam, who beat single coverage by Duncan for a 28-yard touchdown catch. Then on the first play of Washington's ensuing drive, Nate Wright intercepted a pass from Kilmer and returned it 26 yards to the Redskins 8-yard line, setting up a 6-yard touchdown pass from Tarkenton to Gilliam that made the score 24–13. With 5:28 left, Washington got back to within four points, getting good field position due to Ken Stone blocking a Vikings punt and converting it into Kilmer's 28-yard touchdown pass to Roy Jefferson. But the Vikings managed to burn up 4 minutes with their ensuing drive, finishing it off with a 30-yard Cox field goal that gave them a 27–20 lead. The Redskins had less than two minutes to drive for a tying touchdown, and ended up turning the ball over on downs at the Vikings 42-yard line.

Tarkenton completed 16/28 passes for 222 yards and two touchdowns, with 1 interception. Reed had 17 carries for 95 yards and caught 4 passes for 76. Brown rushed for 115 yards and a touchdown, while also catching 2 passes for 13 yards.

“Sometimes they’re not concentrating on me,” said Oscar Reed, in reference to his big plays in the game. “Since early in the season they’ve been keying on Chuck Foreman. I’m not the world’s greatest pass catcher or runner, but given a little room, I’ll use what I’ve got.”

This was the first postseason meeting between the Redskins and Vikings.

==== AFC: Oakland Raiders 33, Pittsburgh Steelers 14 ====
Pittsburgh Steelers vs. Oakland Raiders – Game summary

Quarter	1	2	3	4	Total
Steelers	0	7	0	7	14
Raiders	7	3	13	10	33

at Oakland Coliseum, Oakland, California

- Game time: 4:00 p.m. EST
- Game attendance: 52,646
- Referee: Pat Haggerty
- TV announcers (NBC): Jim Simpson and Kyle Rote
- Boxscore

Game information

First quarter

- OAK – Marv Hubbard 1-yard run (George Blanda kick). Raiders 7–0.

Second quarter

- OAK – George Blanda 25-yard field goal. Raiders 10–0.
- PIT – Barry Pearson 4-yard pass from Terry Bradshaw (Roy Gerela kick). Raiders 10–7.

Third quarter

- OAK – George Blanda 31-yard field goal. Raiders 13–7.
- OAK – George Blanda 22-yard field goal. Raiders 16–7.
- OAK – Willie Brown 54-yard interception return (George Blanda kick). Raiders 23–7.

Fourth quarter

- OAK – George Blanda 10-yard field goal. Raiders 26–7.
- PIT – Frank Lewis 26-yard pass from Terry Bradshaw (Roy Gerela kick). Raiders 26–14.
- OAK – Marv Hubbard 1-yard run (George Blanda kick). Raiders 33–14.

Top passers

- PIT – Terry Bradshaw – 12/25, 167 yards, 2 TD, 3 INT
- OAK – Ken Stabler – 14/17, 142 yards

Top rushers

- PIT – Franco Harris – 10 rushes, 29 yards
- OAK – Marv Hubbard – 20 rushes, 91 yards, TD

Top receivers

- PIT – Frank Lewis – 4 receptions, 70 yards, TD
- OAK – Mike Siani – 5 receptions, 68 yards

The Raiders outgained Pittsburgh in total yards 361 to 223, forced three turnovers without losing any on their side, and scored 16 unanswered points in the second half to defeat the Steelers.

After forcing the Steelers to punt on the game's opening drive, Oakland drove 82 yards in 16 plays, including a 20-yard burst by running back Marv Hubbard, to go up 7–0 on Hubbard's 1-yard touchdown run. In the second quarter, Pittsburgh drove into Raiders territory, only to lose the ball when Terry Bradshaw's pass was deflected by Otis Sistrunk into the arms of linebacker Phil Villapiano for an interception. A 21-yard completion from Ken Stabler to receiver Mike Siani on the ensuing drive set up a 25-yard field goal by George Blanda, increasing the Raiders lead to 10–0 with 8 minutes left in the half. The Steelers were forced to punt on their next drive, but their defense subsequently forced the Raiders to go three-and-out. Then safety Glen Edwards returned Ray Guy's 40-yard punt 20 yards to the Oakland 45-yard line. On the next play, Bradshaw completed a 24-yard pass to running back Preston Pearson. Bradshaw eventually threw an incomplete pass on third down, but a 15-yard roughing the passer penalty gave the Steelers a first down on the Oakland 7. Following a 3-yard running play, Bradshaw finished the drive with a 4-yard touchdown toss to Pearson, cutting the score to 10–7 going into halftime.

Oakland dominated the second half with 16 consecutive points. After Clarence Davis returned the second half kickoff 30 yards to the Raiders 32, a 15-yard roughing the passer penalty against Pittsburgh and a 17-yard completion from Stabler to Hubbard led to Blanda's 31-yard field goal. The Steelers had to punt on their next drive, and George Atkinson returned the ball 13 yards to the Oakland 43, sparking a drive that ended with another Blanda field goal that gave the Raiders a 16–7 lead. Pittsburgh seemed primed to respond when Frank Lewis caught a 17-yard reception that put them in Raiders territory, but on the next play, Willie Brown intercepted a pass from Bradshaw and returned it 54 yards for a touchdown. With the Steelers now facing a 23–7 deficit, the situation continued to unravel as Bradshaw was intercepted again on the next drive, this time by Atkinson, who returned it 8 yards to the Raiders 37. Oakland running back Charlie Smith then took off on a 40-yard run to the Steelers 22, setting up Blanda's third field goal that gave them a 26–7 lead.

With 9:12 left in the fourth quarter, Pittsburgh got one last chance to get back in the game as Bradshaw's 26-yard touchdown pass to Lewis cut the score to 26–14. But after a punt from each team, Oakland put the game away, mainly due to Hubbard, who rushed for gains of 16, 15, 9, and 2 yards before finishing the drive with a 1-yard touchdown run, giving the Raiders a 33–14 lead with 14 seconds left on the clock.

Stabler completed 14/17 passes for 142 yards. Hubbard rushed for 91 yards and two touchdowns, while also catching a 17-yard pass. Smith added 73 yards rushing and 10 yards receiving. Bradshaw was held to just 12/25 completions for 167 yards, with 2 touchdowns and 3 interceptions. Future Hall of Fame running back Franco Harris was held to 29 yards on 10 carries.

This was the second postseason meeting between the Steelers and Raiders, with Pittsburgh winning last year's meeting.

Previous playoff games
Pittsburgh leads 1–0 in all-time playoff games

1972

Oakland Raiders 7 @ Pittsburgh Steelers 13

1972 AFC Divisional playoffs

=== Sunday, December 23, 1973 ===
==== AFC: Miami Dolphins 34, Cincinnati Bengals 16 ====
Cincinnati Bengals vs. Miami Dolphins – Game summary

Quarter	1	2	3	4	Total
Bengals	3	13	0	0	16
Dolphins	14	7	10	3	34

at Miami Orange Bowl, Miami, Florida

- Game time: 1:00 p.m. EST
- Game attendance: 78,928
- Referee: Bernie Ulman
- TV announcers (NBC): Curt Gowdy and Al DeRogatis

Game information

First quarter

- MIA – Paul Warfield 13-yard pass from Bob Griese (Garo Yepremian kick). Dolphins 7–0.
- CIN – Horst Muhlmann 24-yard field goal. Dolphins 7–3.
- MIA – Larry Csonka 1-yard run (Garo Yepremian kick). Dolphins 14–3.

Second quarter

- MIA – Mercury Morris 4-yard run (Garo Yepremian kick). Dolphins 21–3.
- CIN – Neal Craig 45-yard interception return (Horst Muhlmann kick). Dolphins 21–10.
- CIN – Horst Muhlmann 46-yard field goal. Dolphins 21–13.
- CIN – Horst Muhlmann 12-yard field goal. Dolphins 21–16.

Third quarter

- MIA – Jim Mandich 7-yard pass from Bob Griese (Garo Yepremian kick). Dolphins 28–16.
- MIA – Garo Yepremian 50-yard field goal. Dolphins 31–16.

Fourth quarter

- MIA – Garo Yepremian 46-yard field goal. Dolphins 34–16.

Top passers

- CIN – Ken Anderson – 14/27, 113 yards, INT
- MIA – Bob Griese – 11/18, 159 yards, 2 TD, INT

Top rushers

- CIN – Boobie Clark – 7 rushes, 40 yards
- MIA – Mercury Morris – 20 rushes, 106 yards, TD

Top receivers

- CIN – Lenvil Elliott – 9 receptions, 53 yards
- MIA – Paul Warfield – 4 receptions, 95 yards, TD

The Dolphins outgained Cincinnati in total yards, 400–194, and first downs, 27–11, while also scoring on three of their first four possessions and shutting out the Bengals in the second half. The Dolphins racked up 241 yards on the ground, including 106 from Mercury Morris and 71 from Larry Csonka, while receiver Paul Warfield caught 5 passes for 95 yards and a score.

Miami dominated the game early on, scoring on their opening drive with Bob Griese's 13-yard touchdown pass to Warfield. Morris racked up 33 rushing yards on the way to Miami's next first quarter touchdown, a 1-yard run by Csonka. In the second quarter, faced with 3rd and 1 from his own 44, Griese completed a 48-yard bomb to Warfield that set up Morris' 4-yard touchdown run. Miami's three touchdowns came on drives of 80, 80, and 73 yards, while all Cincinnati could manage in the first 26 minutes of the contest was 24-yard field goal by Horst Muhlmann on their first drive of the game. Even that drive caused a major setback for the team, as running back Essex Johnson, the team's leading rusher during the season with 997 yards, suffered a game-ending injury after picking up 14 yards on his first carry.

Facing the prospect of going into their locker room with a 21–3 deficit, the Bengals suddenly stormed back with 13 points in the final 3:26 of the second quarter. First, defensive back Neal Craig intercepted Griese's pass intended for Jim Mandich near the sideline and returned it 45 yards for a touchdown. Then the Bengals defense forced a punt and got the ball back on their own 33 with less than two minutes left. It took nearly all of that time for the team to cross midfield, but quarterback Ken Anderson finally got them into scoring range with a 22-yard scramble to the Dolphins 38, where Muhlmann made a 46-yard field goal that cut the score to 21–13. Now with just 8 seconds left until halftime, Morris fumbled the ensuing kickoff, and Bengals linebacker Jim LeClair recovered on the Dolphins 3-yard line. On the next play, Muhlmann kicked a 12-yard field goal that sent both teams into their locker rooms with a score of 21–16.

However, Cincinnati's hope of a comeback was quickly crushed in the second half. On the third play of the third quarter, Anderson tried to connect on a deep pass to tight end Bob Trumpy, but it was intercepted by Dick Anderson, who returned the ball 19 yards to the Bengals 28. Seven plays later, Miami went up 28–16 with Griese's 7-yard touchdown pass to Mandich. Dolphins kicker Garo Yepremian put the finishing touches on his team's victory with field goals from 50 and 46 yards.

This was the first postseason meeting between the Bengals and Dolphins.

==== NFC: Dallas Cowboys 27, Los Angeles Rams 16 ====
Los Angeles Rams vs. Dallas Cowboys – Game summary

Quarter	1	2	3	4	Total
Rams	0	6	0	10	16
Cowboys	14	3	0	10	27

at Texas Stadium, Irving, Texas

- Game time: 4:00 p.m. EST
- Game attendance: 63,272
- Referee: Fred Silva
- TV announcers (CBS): Frank Glieber, Pat Summerall and Bart Starr

Game information

First quarter

- DAL – Calvin Hill 3-yard run (Toni Fritsch kick). Cowboys 7–0.
- DAL – Drew Pearson 4-yard pass from Roger Staubach (Toni Fritsch kick). Cowboys 14–0.

Second quarter

- DAL – Toni Fritsch 39-yard field goal. Cowboys 17–0.
- LA – David Ray 33-yard field goal. Cowboys 17–3.
- LA – David Ray 37-yard field goal. Cowboys 17–6.

Third quarter

- No scoring plays.

Fourth quarter

- LA – David Ray 40-yard field goal. Cowboys 17–9.
- LA – Tony Baker 5-yard run (David Ray kick). Cowboys 17–16.
- DAL – Drew Pearson 83-yard pass from Roger Staubach (Toni Fritsch kick). Cowboys 24–16.
- DAL – Toni Fritsch 12-yard field goal. Cowboys 27–16.

Top passers

- LA – John Hadl – 7/23, 133 yards, INT
- DAL – Roger Staubach – 8/16, 180 yards, 2 TD, 2 INT

Top rushers

- LA – Lawrence McCutcheon – 13 rushes, 48 yards
- DAL – Calvin Hill – 25 rushes, 97 yards, TD

Top receivers

- LA – Jack Snow – 3 receptions, 77 yards
- DAL – Drew Pearson – 2 receptions, 87 yards, 2 TD

The Cowboys avenged a 37–31 regular season loss to L.A. as two Rams turnovers in the first quarter gave the Cowboys a 14–0 lead. Lee Roy Jordan's interception of a John Hadl pass on the first play of the game led to Calvin Hill's 3-yard touchdown run. Mel Renfro then recovered a Lawrence McCutcheon fumble on the L.A. 35-yard line to set up the Cowboys again which later resulted in Roger Staubach's 4-yard touchdown pass to Drew Pearson.

In the second quarter, Toni Fritsch then added a 39-yard field goal to increase Dallas' lead to 17–0. However, a 40-yard reception by Rams receiver Harold Jackson set up David Ray's 33-yard field goal that made the score 17–3. Ray would miss three field goals throughout the game, but made two more to cut the score to 17–9 in the fourth quarter. Then Hill lost a fumble that L.A. converted into Tony Baker's 5-yard touchdown run, making the score 17–16 with 10 minutes left in regulation.

Ever since taking their 17–0 lead in the second quarter, the Cowboys had managed just four first downs and had not crossed midfield, as Staubach faced a relentless pass rush that sacked him seven times (2½ by Jack Youngblood, 2 by Merlin Olsen). But when faced with third down and long after an Olsen sack on the ensuing drive, Staubach threw a short pass over the middle to Drew Pearson, and as the Rams were about to stop Pearson for a short gain, defensive backs Dave Elmendorf and Steve Preece collided and fell, allowing Pearson to scamper untouched for an 83-yard touchdown that effectively clinched the game. Fritsch added another field goal for the 27–16 final.

This was the first postseason meeting between the Rams and Cowboys.

== Conference championships ==
=== Sunday, December 30, 1973 ===
==== NFC: Minnesota Vikings 27, Dallas Cowboys 10 ====
Minnesota Vikings vs. Dallas Cowboys – Game summary

Quarter	1	2	3	4	Total
Vikings	3	7	7	10	27
Cowboys	0	0	10	0	10

at Texas Stadium, Irving, Texas

- Game time: 1:00 p.m. EST
- Game attendance: 64,422
- Referee: Norm Schachter
- TV announcers (CBS): Jack Buck, Pat Summerall and Wayne Walker
- Boxscore

Game information

First quarter

- MIN – Fred Cox 44-yard field goal. Vikings 3–0.

Second quarter

- MIN – Chuck Foreman 5-yard run (Fred Cox kick). Vikings 10–0.

Third quarter

- DAL – Golden Richards 63-yard punt return (Toni Fritsch kick). Vikings 10–7.
- MIN – John Gilliam 54-yard pass from Fran Tarkenton (Fred Cox kick). Vikings 17–7.
- DAL – Toni Fritsch 17-yard field goal. Vikings 17–10.

Fourth quarter

- MIN – Bobby Bryant 63-yard interception return (Fred Cox kick). Vikings 24–10.
- MIN – Fred Cox 34-yard field goal. Vikings 27–10.

Top passers

- MIN – Fran Tarkenton – 10/21, 133 yards, TD
- DAL – Roger Staubach – 10/21, 89 yards

Top rushers

- MIN – Chuck Foreman – 19 rushes, 76 yards, TD
- DAL – Robert Newhouse – 14 rushes, 50 yards

Top receivers

- MIN – John Gilliam – 2 receptions, 63 yards, TD
- DAL – Bob Hayes – 2 receptions, 25 yards

The Vikings forced 4 interceptions and recovered 2 fumbles in the second half while also holding Dallas to 152 total yards en route to a 27–10 victory over the Cowboys.

With the loss of running back Calvin Hill and defensive tackle Bob Lilly to injuries, Dallas' offense could not get anything going. Minnesota jumped to a 10–0 lead by halftime with a Fred Cox field goal and an 86-yard drive that ended with a 5-yard rushing touchdown by Chuck Foreman. The touchdown drive included Fran Tarkenton's completions to tight end Stu Voigt for gains of 16 and 7 yards, a 2-yard run by Foreman on 4th down and 1, and a 12-yard scramble by Tarkenton himself.

What followed would be an amazingly sloppy second half in which both teams combined for 10 turnovers. Three minutes into the third quarter, Dallas quarterback Roger Staubach threw an interception to Minnesota cornerback Bobby Bryant on the Vikings 2-yard line. But the Cowboys defense forced a punt and Golden Richards returned it 63 yards for a touchdown, cutting the score to 10–7. Tarkenton quickly struck back, throwing a 54-yard touchdown pass to John Gilliam, who managed to outrun single coverage by Cowboys future Hall of Fame defensive back Mel Renfro. Dallas responded with Toni Fritsch's 17-yard field goal which cut the lead to 17–10.

Then a wave of turnovers began. On the ensuing possession, Dallas got a huge opportunity to score when Charlie Waters forced a fumble from Foreman that safety Cliff Harris recovered on the Minnesota 37. However, the Vikings took the ball right back when Staubach threw a pass that was deflected into the arms of linebacker Jeff Siemon. An even better scoring chance awaited the Cowboys at the end of the Vikings' next drive, as Tarkenton threw an interception to Waters on the Minnesota 24. But Dallas fared no better this time, losing the ball again when Jim Marshall knocked it out of Staubach's hand as he wound up for a pass, and defensive lineman Gary Larsen recovered it. The offensive futility continued with Minnesota, as their next drive ended with a fumbled handoff exchange between Tarkenton and Foreman that Dallas lineman Larry Cole recovered on the Vikings 47-yard line.

A few plays later, Dallas faced 3rd and 3 with 9 minutes left in the fourth quarter. Staubach attempted a pass to Bob Hayes near the right sideline, but Bryant intercepted the pass and raced 63 yards for a touchdown that put the Vikings up 24–10. Then on Dallas' next drive, Staubach tried to connect with Drew Pearson, but a devastating hit by Nate Wright caused the ball to bounce off his hands and into the arms of Jeff Wright, who returned the ball 13 yards to set up Cox's 34-yard game clinching field goal.

Both teams combined for a net total of just 163 passing yards. Tarkenton completed only 10/21 passes for 133 yards and a touchdown with one interception, while also rushing for 16 yards. Staubach had one of the worst postseason performances of his career, completing just 10/21 passes for 89 yards and throwing 4 interceptions, though he did rush for 30 yards. Foreman was the top offensive performer of the day with 76 rushing yards and 4 receptions for 28, while fullback Oscar Reed added 18 carries for 75 yards and an 8-yard catch.

This was the second postseason meeting between the Vikings and Cowboys, with Dallas winning the only previous meeting.

Previous playoff games
Dallas leads 1–0 in all-time playoff games

1971

Dallas Cowboys 20 @ Minnesota Vikings 12

1971 NFC Divisional playoffs

==== AFC: Miami Dolphins 27, Oakland Raiders 10 ====
Oakland Raiders vs. Miami Dolphins – Game summary

Quarter	1	2	3	4	Total
Raiders	0	0	10	0	10
Dolphins	7	7	3	10	27

at Miami Orange Bowl, Miami, Florida

- Game time: 4:00 p.m. EST
- Game attendance: 79,325
- Referee: Tommy Bell
- TV announcers (NBC): Curt Gowdy and Al DeRogatis
- Boxscore

Game information

First quarter

- MIA – Larry Csonka 11-yard run (Garo Yepremian kick). Dolphins 7–0.

Second quarter

- MIA – Larry Csonka 2-yard run (Garo Yepremian kick). Dolphins 14–0.

Third quarter

- OAK – George Blanda 21-yard field goal. Dolphins 14–3.
- MIA – Garo Yepremian 42-yard field goal. Dolphins 17–3.
- OAK – Mike Siani 25-yard pass from Ken Stabler (George Blanda kick). Dolphins 17–10.

Fourth quarter

- MIA – Garo Yepremian 27-yard field goal. Dolphins 20–10.
- MIA – Larry Csonka 2-yard run (Garo Yepremian kick). Dolphins 27–10.

Top passers

- OAK – Ken Stabler – 15/23, 129 yards, TD, INT
- MIA – Bob Griese – 3/6, 34 yards, INT

Top rushers

- OAK – Marv Hubbard – 10 rushes, 54 yards
- MIA – Larry Csonka – 29 rushes, 117 yards, 3 TD

Top receivers

- OAK – Mike Siani – 3 receptions, 45 yards, TD
- MIA – Paul Warfield – 1 reception, 27 yards

Miami threw only six passes during the game, completing just 3 for 34 yards, but gained 266 rushing yards (more than Oakland's total yards for the game) on 53 carries. Fullback Larry Csonka led the Dolphins to a victory with 117 rushing yards and an AFC playoff record 3 rushing touchdowns.

Miami scored on an opening 64-yard drive when quarterback Bob Griese's 27-yard run set up Csonka's 11-yard rushing touchdown. Csonka scored again late in the second quarter at the end of a 63-yard drive that took more than 8 minutes off the clock, finishing it with a 2-yard touchdown run to make the score 14–0 with 14 seconds left in the half.

Oakland managed to get on the board in the third quarter with a 21-yard George Blanda field goal, but this was quickly countered with a 42-yard Garo Yepremian field goal set up by Charlie Leigh's 53-yard kickoff return. Oakland then drove 78 yards and scored on Ken Stabler's 25-yard touchdown pass to wide receiver Mike Siani, cutting the lead to 17–10. In the fourth quarter, after Griese's 17-yard run on a QB draw set up Yepremian's 26-yard field goal, the Raiders were faced with fourth down and inches on the Dolphins 42 and were forced to "go for it". But running back Marv Hubbard fumbled the ball while trying to get through the line. The ball bounced into the hands of Stabler, who was tackled for a loss by defensive back Dick Anderson, and the Dolphins used their running game to take time off the clock and set up Csonka's third touchdown to clinch the game.

This was the second postseason meeting between the Raiders and Dolphins, with Oakland winning the only previous meeting.

Previous playoff games
Oakland leads 1–0 in all-time playoff games

1970

Miami Dolphins 14 @ Oakland Raiders 21

1970 AFC Divisional playoffs

== Super Bowl VIII: Miami Dolphins 24, Minnesota Vikings 7 ==
Super Bowl VIII – Minnesota Vikings vs. Miami Dolphins – Game summary

Quarter	1	2	3	4	Total
Vikings (NFC)	0	0	0	7	7
Dolphins (AFC)	14	3	7	0	24

at Rice Stadium, Houston, Texas

- Date: January 13, 1974
- Game attendance: 71,882
- Referee: Ben Dreith
- TV announcers (CBS): Ray Scott, Pat Summerall and Bart Starr

This was the first Super Bowl meeting between the Vikings and Dolphins.
