= Fran Tarkenton =

American football player (born 1940)

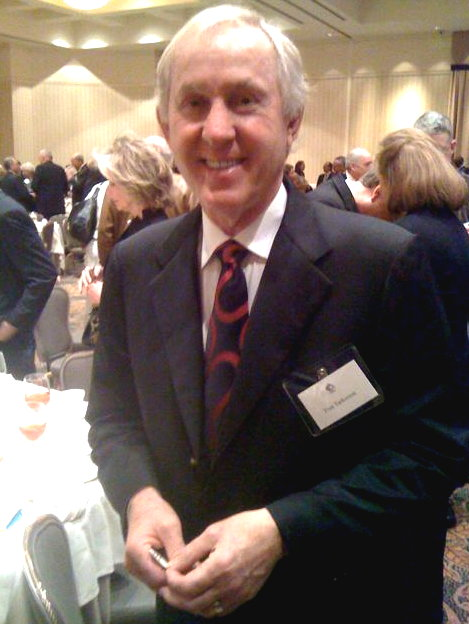
- Tarkenton in 2010

No. 10
- Position: Quarterback

Personal information
- Born: February 3, 1940 (age 86); Richmond, Virginia, U.S.
- Listed height: 6 ft 0 in (1.83 m)
- Listed weight: 190 lb (86 kg)

Career information
- High school: Athens (Athens, Georgia)
- College: Georgia (1958–1960)
- NFL draft: 1961: 3rd round, 29th overall pick
- AFL draft: 1961: 5th round, 35th overall pick

Career history
- Minnesota Vikings (1961–1966); New York Giants (1967–1971); Minnesota Vikings (1972–1978)

Awards and highlights
- NFL Most Valuable Player (1975); NFL Offensive Player of the Year (1975); First-team All-Pro (1975); Second-team All-Pro (1973); 9× Pro Bowl (1964, 1965, 1967–1970, 1974–1976); NFL passing yards leader (1978); NFL passing touchdowns leader (1975); NFL completion percentage leader (1977); Bert Bell Award (1975); 50 Greatest Vikings; 50 Greatest Giants; Minnesota Vikings Anniversary Team (25th, 40th); Minnesota Vikings Ring of Honor; Minnesota Vikings No. 10 retired; 33rd greatest New York Giant of all-time; 2× First-team All-SEC (1959, 1960)

Career NFL statistics
- Passing attempts: 6,467
- Passing completions: 3,686
- Completion percentage: 57.0%
- TD–INT: 342–266
- Passer rating: 80.4
- Passing yards: 47,003
- Rushing yards: 3,674
- Rushing touchdowns: 32
- Stats at Pro Football Reference
- Pro Football Hall of Fame
- College Football Hall of Fame

Francis Asbury Tarkenton (born February 3, 1940), nicknamed "the Scrambler", is an American former professional football quarterback who played in the National Football League (NFL) for 18 seasons, primarily with the Minnesota Vikings. He is widely regarded as the first great dual-threat quarterback in the NFL. He played college football for the Georgia Bulldogs, where he was recognized as a twice first-team All-SEC, and was selected by the Vikings in the third round of the 1961 NFL draft. After retiring from football in 1979, he became a media personality and computer software executive.

Tarkenton's tenure with the Vikings spanned thirteen non-consecutive seasons. He played for Minnesota for six seasons from 1961 to 1966 when he was traded to the New York Giants for five seasons, and then traded back to Minnesota for his last seven seasons from 1972 to 1978. At the time of his retirement, Tarkenton was the all-time NFL career leader in numerous records (including career passing touchdowns, yards, and completions). He was inducted into the Pro Football Hall of Fame in 1986 and the College Football Hall of Fame in 1987.

In addition to his football career, Tarkenton served as a commentator on Monday Night Football and a co-host of That's Incredible!. He also purchased a computer-program generator company, which he renamed Tarkenton Software. Eventually the company merged with KnowledgeWare, Inc., where he was Chairman until selling the company to Sterling Software in 1994.

== Early life and education ==
Tarkenton was born on February 3, 1940, in Richmond, Virginia. His father, Dallas Tarkenton, was a Methodist minister. He went to Athens High School in Athens, Georgia, and later attended the University of Georgia, where he was the quarterback on the Bulldog football team and a member of the Sigma Alpha Epsilon fraternity.

Under head coach Wally Butts and with Tarkenton as quarterback, Georgia won the Southeastern Conference championship in 1959. Tarkenton was a first-team All-SEC selection in both 1959 and 1960.

== Professional football career ==
The expansion Minnesota Vikings selected Tarkenton in the third round (29th overall) of the 1961 NFL draft, and he was picked in the fifth round of the AFL draft by the Boston Patriots. He signed with the Vikings. Tarkenton, 21, played his first NFL game in Sioux Falls, South Dakota against the Dallas Cowboys (and the Vikings' first ever game as an expansion team.) On September 17 against the Chicago Bears, he came off the bench to lead the Vikings to a 37–13 victory by passing for 250 yards and four touchdown passes and running for another. He was the only player in NFL history to pass for four touchdowns in his first NFL game until the feat was repeated by Marcus Mariota in the Tennessee Titans' 2015 season opener against the Tampa Bay Buccaneers.

He played for the Vikings from 1961 through 1966. His early years with the team were plagued by the trouble expected for a newly created team, with the Vikings winning a total of 10 games combined in their first three seasons, with Tarkenton winning eight of them. He threw 18 touchdowns and 17 interceptions for 1,997 yards in his first season. He rushed for 308 yards on 56 rushes for five touchdowns. The following year, he threw 22 touchdowns and 25 interceptions for 2,595 yards. He rushed for 361 yards on 41 rushes for two touchdowns.

Tarkenton did not get along with team coach Norm Van Brocklin, who did not like his penchant for scrambling. For the week 13 game against Atlanta in 1966, Van Brocklin went as far as benching Tarkenton to put in Bob Berry, a QB more to Van Brocklin's preferences (the Vikings proceeded to lose 20–14 to the 1-10 expansion team). Tarkenton soon demanded a trade. In February 1967, Van Brocklin announced his resignation. On March 7, 1967, Tarkenton was traded to the New York Giants for a first and second round pick in 1967, a first-round pick in 1968 and a second-round pick in 1969. In his first year with the Giants, Tarkenton passed for a then-career high 3,088 yards and a career high 29 touchdown passes en route to a 7–7 record, a huge improvement for a team that had finished 1-12-1 the year before. Tarkenton has stated that his 1967 season remains the highlight of his career. In the 1968 season, he helped lead the team to a 7–7 record. He passed for 2,555 yards, 21 touchdowns, and 12 interceptions to go with 57 carries for 301 rushing yards and three rushing touchdowns. In the first game of the 1969 season, the Giants played the Vikings. After trailing 23–10 in the fourth quarter, Tarkenton threw two touchdown passes to secure a 24–23 comeback victory over his former team. The 24 points allowed by Minnesota's defense were a season-worst for the unit, one more point than the Vikings allowed in losing Super Bowl IV to the Kansas City Chiefs in January.

Tarkenton enjoyed his best season with the Giants in 1970. They overcame an 0–3 start with nine wins in the next ten games and moved into position to win the NFC East division championship in week 14. However, New York was routed 31–3 by the Los Angeles Rams at Yankee Stadium to finish at 9–5, one game behind the division champion Dallas Cowboys and the wild card Detroit Lions. The 1970 season was the closest the Giants came to making the playoffs during a 17-year drought, from 1964 through 1980.

On January 27, 1972, Tarkenton was traded back to the Vikings for quarterback Norm Snead, receiver Bob Grim, running back Vince Clements, a first rounder in 1972 (24th overall: Larry Jacobson, defensive lineman), and a second rounder in 1973 (40th overall: Brad Van Pelt, linebacker). Tarkenton led the Vikings to three NFC championships, but the Vikings lost each ensuing Super Bowl. In the 1974 Super Bowl, Minnesota lost to the Miami Dolphins 24–7 in Houston. On October 27, 1974 at home against the New England Patriots, and his Vikings leading 14-10, Tarkenton was ejected from the game in the fourth quarter after an altercation on the sidelines with Patriots cornerback Ron Bolton, who was also ejected simultaneously. The Vikings would be forced to punt on that drive, and the Patriots scored a touchdown with seconds remaining to win 17-14. This marked the first quarterback ejection in NFL history and as of 2025 only two other quarterbacks (Rams Quarterback Tony Banks in 1996, and then-Tampa Bay Buccaneers quarterback Trent Dilfer in 1995, coincidentally against the Vikings in Minnesota) in league history have been ejected from a game.

They lost the 1975 Super Bowl to the Pittsburgh Steelers 16–6 in New Orleans, and (in Minnesota's last Super Bowl to date) lost the 1977 Super Bowl to the Oakland Raiders 32–14 at the Rose Bowl in Pasadena, California.

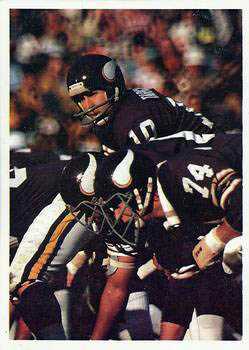
Tarkenton calling signals for the Minnesota Vikings

In his 18 NFL seasons, Tarkenton completed 3,686 of 6,467 passes for 47,003 yards, 342 touchdowns, and 266 interceptions, all of which were NFL records at the time of his retirement. Tarkenton's 47,003 career passing yards rank him 14th all time, while his 342 career passing touchdowns is 13th all time in NFL history. He also is 13th on the all-time list of regular-season wins by a starting quarterback with 124 regular season victories. He used his impressive scrambling ability to rack up 3,674 rushing yards and 32 touchdowns on 675 carries. During his career, Tarkenton ran for a touchdown in 15 different seasons, an NFL record among quarterbacks. He ranks eighth in career rushing yards among quarterbacks, behind Lamar Jackson, Michael Vick, Cam Newton, Russell Wilson, Randall Cunningham, Steve Young, and Josh Allen. When he retired, Tarkenton held NFL career records in pass attempts, completions, yardage, touchdowns, rushing yards by a quarterback, and wins by a starting quarterback.

The Vikings finished the 1975 season with an NFC-best 12–2 record and Tarkenton won the NFL Most Valuable Player Award and the NFL Offensive Player of the Year Award while capturing All-Pro honors in the process. He was also a second-team All-Pro in 1973 and earned All-NFC selections in 1972 and 1976. He was named second-team All-NFC in 1970 and 1974. Tarkenton was selected to play in nine Pro Bowls.

Tarkenton was indecisive on his retirement during the last seven years of his playing career. In the early months of 1979, he was offered a contract to play one more year and "receive $100,000 annually for the next 10 years as a nonplayer." On May 8, 1979, he announced his retirement.

Despite not winning a Super Bowl, he won six playoff games, and in 1999 he was ranked #59 on The Sporting News list of the 100 Greatest Football Players. Playing in the era of sacks not being counted by the league, Tarkenton was sacked 570 times in his career, unofficially the most in league history at the time of his retirement.

Tarkenton was inducted into the Georgia Sports Hall of Fame in 1977, the Pro Football Hall of Fame in 1986, the College Football Hall of Fame in 1987, and the Athens, Georgia Athletic Hall of Fame in 2000.

== Books ==
A biography of Tarkenton titled Better Scramble than Lose was published in 1969. This followed Tarkenton's 1967 autobiography No Time for Losing and preceded by several years his 1977 autobiography Tarkenton co-written with Jim Klobuchar. The autobiographies chronicle not only his football career but also his personal evolution from his early football days as a preacher's son. Tarkenton co-wrote with Brock Yates a book in 1971 titled Broken Patterns: The Education of a Quarterback, a chronicle of the 1970 New York Giants season.

In 1986, Tarkenton, with author Herb Resincow, wrote a novel titled Murder at the Super Bowl, the whodunit story of a football coach killed just before his team is to participate in the championship game.

Tarkenton wrote the self-help, motivational books Playing to Win in 1984, and How to Motivate People: The Team Strategy for Success in 1986. He also wrote the motivational self-help business book titled What Losing Taught Me About Winning, and Every Day is Game Day. In 1987, Tarkenton hosted a Think and Grow Rich TV infomercial that sold the book with an audio cassette version (the audio cassettes contained an introduction and conclusion by Tarkenton).

== Business ventures and investments ==
Mark McCormack helped Tarkenton invest, making him wealthy enough to "retire this week if [he] wanted to", as New York magazine wrote in 1971. Tarkenton purchased a computer software program generator company in the 1980s, which he renamed Tarkenton Software. The company merged with KnowledgeWare in 1986. Several senior executives as well as a significant business partner broke with the company in 1990, citing operational disagreements with Tarkenton. The company was sold to Sterling Software in 1994.

Tarkenton served as a color commentator on Monday Night Football from 1979 to 1982.

In 1999, Tarkenton was fined by federal regulators as part of a securities fraud sweep. According to the L.A. Times, "In Tarkenton's case, the Hall of Fame quarterback and 10 other former executives of his computer software and consulting firm, KnowledgeWare Inc., were accused of inflating by millions of dollars the company's earnings in reports for its fiscal year ended June 30, 1994. The former Minnesota Vikings quarterback agreed to pay a $100,000 fine and $54,187 in restitution. He did not admit any wrongdoing".

Since then, Tarkenton has been promoting various products and services including Tony Robbins and 1-800-BAR-NONE. He also founded GoSmallBiz, a small-business consulting website. He also operates an annuity marketing firm called Tarkenton Financial.

== Politics ==
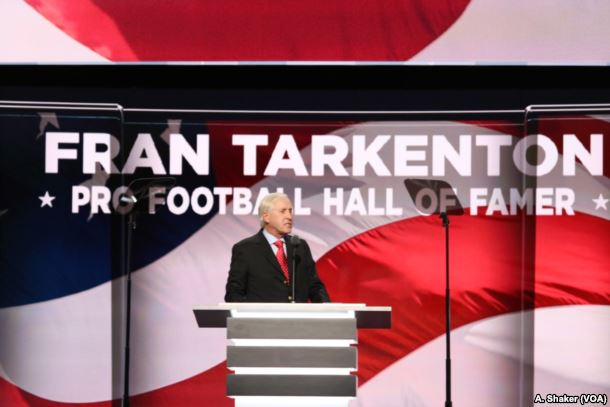
Tarkenton speaking at the 2016 Republican National Convention

During the 2016 Republican National Convention, Tarkenton gave a speech endorsing Republican presidential nominee Donald Trump.

== NFL career statistics ==
Legend
| | AP NFL MVP & OPOTY |
| | Led the league |
| **Bold** | Career high |

| Year | Team | Games | | Passing | | | | | | | | | Rushing | | | | |
| Year | Team | GP | GS | Cmp | Att | Pct | Yds | Avg | TD | Int | Lng | Rtg | Att | Yds | Avg | Lng | TD |
|---|---|---|---|---|---|---|---|---|---|---|---|---|---|---|---|---|---|
| 1961 | MIN | 14 | 10 | 157 | 280 | 56.1 | 1,997 | 7.1 | 18 | 17 | 71 | 74.7 | 56 | 308 | 5.5 | **52** | **5** |
| 1962 | MIN | 14 | 14 | 163 | 329 | 49.5 | 2,595 | 7.9 | 22 | 25 | **89** | 66.9 | 41 | 361 | **8.8** | 31 | 2 |
| 1963 | MIN | 14 | 13 | 170 | 297 | 57.2 | 2,311 | 7.8 | 15 | 15 | 67 | 78.0 | 28 | 162 | 5.8 | 24 | 1 |
| 1964 | MIN | 14 | 14 | 171 | 306 | 55.9 | 2,506 | **8.2** | 22 | 11 | 64 | 91.8 | 50 | 330 | 6.6 | 31 | 2 |
| 1965 | MIN | 14 | 14 | 171 | 329 | 52.0 | 2,609 | 7.9 | 19 | 11 | 72 | 83.8 | 56 | 356 | 6.4 | 36 | 1 |
| 1966 | MIN | 14 | 12 | 192 | 358 | 53.6 | 2,561 | 7.2 | 17 | 16 | 68 | 73.8 | **62** | **376** | 6.1 | 28 | 4 |
| 1967 | NYG | 14 | 14 | 204 | 377 | 54.1 | 3,088 | **8.2** | **29** | 19 | 70 | 85.9 | 44 | 306 | 7.0 | 22 | 2 |
| 1968 | NYG | 14 | 14 | 182 | 337 | 54.0 | 2,555 | 7.6 | 21 | 12 | 84 | 84.6 | 57 | 301 | 5.3 | 22 | 3 |
| 1969 | NYG | 14 | 14 | 220 | 409 | 53.8 | 2,918 | 7.1 | 23 | 8 | 65 | 87.2 | 37 | 172 | 4.6 | 21 | 0 |
| 1970 | NYG | 14 | 14 | 219 | 389 | 56.3 | 2,777 | 7.1 | 19 | 12 | 59 | 82.2 | 43 | 236 | 5.5 | 20 | 2 |
| 1971 | NYG | 13 | 13 | 226 | 386 | 58.5 | 2,567 | 6.7 | 11 | 21 | 81 | 65.4 | 30 | 111 | 3.7 | 16 | 3 |
| 1972 | MIN | 14 | 14 | 215 | 378 | 56.9 | 2,651 | 7.0 | 18 | 13 | 76 | 80.2 | 27 | 180 | 6.7 | 21 | 0 |
| 1973 | MIN | 14 | 14 | 169 | 274 | 61.7 | 2,113 | 7.7 | 15 | 7 | 54 | **93.2** | 41 | 202 | 4.9 | 16 | 1 |
| 1974 | MIN | 13 | 13 | 199 | 351 | 56.7 | 2,598 | 7.4 | 17 | 12 | 80 | 82.1 | 21 | 120 | 5.7 | 15 | 2 |
| 1975 | MIN | 14 | 14 | 273 | 425 | **64.2** | 2,994 | 7.0 | 25 | 13 | 46 | 91.8 | 16 | 108 | 6.8 | 21 | 2 |
| 1976 | MIN | 13 | 13 | 255 | 412 | 61.9 | 2,961 | 7.2 | 17 | 8 | 56 | 89.3 | 27 | 45 | 1.7 | 20 | 1 |
| 1977 | MIN | 9 | 9 | 155 | 258 | 60.1 | 1,734 | 6.7 | 9 | 14 | 59 | 69.2 | 15 | 6 | 0.4 | 8 | 0 |
| 1978 | MIN | 16 | 16 | **345** | **572** | 60.3 | **3,468** | 6.1 | 25 | **32** | 58 | 68.9 | 24 | −6 | −0.3 | 15 | 1 |
| Career | | 246 | 239 | 3,686 | 6,467 | 57.0 | 47,003 | 7.3 | 342 | 266 | 89 | 80.4 | 675 | 3,674 | 5.4 | 52 | 32 |

=== Postseason ===
| Year | Team | Games | | | Passing | | | | | | | | | | | Rushing | | |
| Year | Team | GP | GS | Record | Cmp | Att | Pct | Yds | Y/A | TD | Int | Lng | Rtg | Att | Yds | Y/A | Lng | TD |
|---|---|---|---|---|---|---|---|---|---|---|---|---|---|---|---|---|---|---|
| 1973 | MIN | 3 | 3 | **2–1** | **44** | **77** | **57.1** | **537** | **7.0** | **3** | 3 | **54** | **75.5** | **12** | **34** | 2.8 | 11 | **1** |
| 1974 | MIN | 3 | 3 | **2–1** | 34 | 69 | 49.3 | 394 | 5.7 | **3** | 6 | 38 | 45.2 | 7 | 5 | 0.7 | 3 | 0 |
| 1975 | MIN | 1 | 1 | 0–1 | 12 | 26 | 46.2 | 135 | 5.2 | 0 | 1 | 40 | 46.2 | 3 | 32 | **10.7** | **16** | 0 |
| 1976 | MIN | 3 | 3 | **2–1** | 41 | 83 | 49.4 | 518 | 6.2 | 4 | 5 | 57 | 60.2 | 2 | 1 | 0.5 | 3 | 0 |
| 1978 | MIN | 1 | 1 | 0–1 | 18 | 37 | 48.6 | 219 | 5.9 | 1 | 2 | 31 | 53.8 | 1 | -2 | -2.0 | -2 | 0 |
| Career | | 11 | 11 | 6–5 | 149 | 292 | 51.0 | 1,803 | 6.2 | 11 | 17 | 57 | 58.6 | 25 | 70 | 2.8 | 16 | 1 |

=== Super Bowl ===
| Year | SB | Team | Opp. | Passing | | | | | | | | Rushing | | | | Result |
| Year | SB | Team | Opp. | Cmp | Att | Pct | Yds | Y/A | TD | Int | Rtg | Att | Yds | Y/A | TD | Result |
|---|---|---|---|---|---|---|---|---|---|---|---|---|---|---|---|---|
| 1973 | VIII | MIN | MIA | **18** | 28 | **64.3** | 182 | **6.5** | 0 | **1** | **67.9** | **4** | **17** | **4.3** | **1** | L 24–7 |
| 1974 | IX | MIN | PIT | 11 | 26 | 42.3 | 102 | 3.9 | 0 | 3 | 14.1 | 1 | 0 | 0.0 | 0 | L 16–6 |
| 1976 | XI | MIN | OAK | 17 | **35** | 48.6 | **205** | 5.9 | **1** | 2 | 52.7 | 0 | 0 | 0.0 | 0 | L 32–14 |
| Career | | | | 46 | 89 | 51.7 | 489 | 5.5 | 1 | 6 | 43.7 | 5 | 17 | 3.4 | 1 | W−L 0–3 |

== Awards and honors ==
NFL

- NFL Most Valuable Player (1975)
- NFL Offensive Player of the Year (1975)
- First-team All-Pro (1975)
- Second-team All-Pro (1973)
- 9× Pro Bowl (1964, 1965, 1967–1970, 1974–1976)
- NFL passing yards leader (1978)
- NFL passing touchdowns leader (1975)
- NFL completion percentage leader (1977)
- Bert Bell Award (1975)
- 50 Greatest Vikings
- 50 Greatest Giants
- Minnesota Vikings Anniversary Team (25th, 40th)
- Minnesota Vikings Ring of Honor
- Minnesota Vikings No. 10 retired
- 33rd greatest New York Giant of all-time

College

- 2× First-team All-SEC (1959, 1960)
- Orange Bowl champion (1960)

== Personal life ==
Tarkenton has been married twice and has four children.

His first marriage was to Anna Elaine Merrell of Decatur, Georgia. They wed on December 22, 1960, at First Baptist Church in Decatur, and divorced in March 1982. They had three children: daughter Angela, son Matthew, and daughter Melissa.

Tarkenton married his second wife, Linda Sebastian, in the mid-1980s. They have one daughter, Hayley Gray Tarkenton, a singer-songwriter.

Tarkenton once dated actress Ali MacGraw in the 1980s.

== See also ==
- List of National Football League career passing touchdowns leaders
- List of National Football League career passing yards leaders
