= KnowledgeWare =

American software company

KnowledgeWare was a software company headquartered in Atlanta, Georgia, co-founded by James Martin and run by Fran Tarkenton. It produced a Computer Aided Software Engineering (CASE) tool called IEW (Information Engineering Workbench) and a subsequent enhancement ADW (Application Development Workbench). These products contained four modules known as 'workstations': Planning, Analysis, Design, & Construction. KnowledgeWare was sold to Sterling Software in 1994, which was in its turn acquired by Computer Associates.

Tarkenton is credited with having coined, "A fool with a tool is a faster fool" while offering classes at their offices on Peachtree Street.

Tarkenton, Don Addington and other executives were eventually involved in legal actions brought by the SEC for engaging in a fraudulent scheme to inflate KnowledgeWare's financial results to meet sales and earnings projections.
