= John Gilliam =

American football player (born 1945)

No. 42, 44, 82, 41
- Position: Wide receiver

Personal information
- Born: August 7, 1945 (age 81); Greenwood, South Carolina, U.S.
- Listed height: 6 ft 1 in (1.85 m)
- Listed weight: 195 lb (88 kg)

Career information
- High school: Brewer (Greenwood)
- College: South Carolina State
- NFL draft: 1967: 2nd round, 52nd overall pick

Career history
- New Orleans Saints (1967–1968); St. Louis Cardinals (1969–1971); Minnesota Vikings (1972–1974); Chicago Winds (1975); Minnesota Vikings (1975); Atlanta Falcons (1976); Chicago Bears (1977); New Orleans Saints (1977)

Awards and highlights
- Second-team All-Pro (1973); 4× Pro Bowl (1972–1975); 50 Greatest Vikings

Career NFL statistics
- Receptions: 382
- Receiving yards: 7,056
- Receiving touchdowns: 48
- Return touchdowns: 2
- Stats at Pro Football Reference

John Rally Gilliam (born August 7, 1945) is an American former professional football player who was a wide receiver in the National Football League (NFL). He has owned a number of businesses, and for two years he worked for a radio station in Atlanta. He has made his home in Atlanta since 1968. His wife Fannie is an attorney, and they have four children.

== Life and career ==
Gilliam attended Brewer High School in Greenwood, South Carolina, then played college football at South Carolina State University, from which he graduated with a degree in biology. While in college he also lettered in track and was clocked in the 100 yard dash in 9.5 seconds, four tenths of a second off the world record at the time. He was drafted in the second round of the 1967 NFL draft by the expansion New Orleans Saints. He played his first two seasons in New Orleans, and then had stints with the St. Louis Cardinals from 1969 to 1971, the Minnesota Vikings from 1972 to 1975, the Atlanta Falcons in 1976, and brief stints with the Chicago Bears and back in New Orleans for 1977. Gilliam played in 2 Super Bowls with the Vikings, Super Bowl VIII and Super Bowl IX. He was elected to the Pro Bowl all four years while he was with Minnesota.

In 1972, Gilliam led the NFL in yards per catch (22) and finished 2nd in receiving yards (1,035) and receiving yards per game (73.9). In 1973, he again finished 2nd in receiving yards (907) and receiving yards per game (64.8) and was named 1st Team All-Pro by the Newspaper Enterprise Association (NEA) and 2nd Team All-Pro by the Associated Press (AP) and the Pro Football Writers Association (PFWA). He was also named 1st Team All-NFC by The Sporting News and UPI in 1973.

He is famous for returning the opening kickoff 94 yards in the Saints' inaugural game in 1967 against the Los Angeles Rams for their first touchdown in franchise history. In Super Bowl VIII, Gilliam returned the second half kickoff 65 yards to the Miami 34, but a clipping penalty wiped out almost all the yardage. One play in Super Bowl IX also resulted in Gilliam colliding with then-NFL Films cameraman (later president) Steve Sabol.

Gilliam played with the Chicago Winds of the WFL in 1975, catching 20 passes for 390 yards, 19.5 average and 2 touchdowns. The Winds folded after 5 games and Gilliam returned to the Vikings in time for the 1975 season. He signed with the Falcons as a free agent before the 1976 season. The Falcons waived him after one season and he signed with the Bears for the 1977 season. The Bears waived him after 2 games and he signed with the Saints for the remainder of the 1977 season.

John was inducted into the South Carolina Football Hall of Fame in 2023.

== NFL career statistics ==
Legend
	Led the league
**Bold**	Career high

=== Regular season ===
Year	Team	Games		Receiving				
Year	Team	GP	GS	Rec	Yds	Avg	Lng	TD
1967	NOR	13	2	22	264	12.0	35	1
1968	NOR	14	4	24	284	11.8	39	0
1969	STL	14	14	**52**	997	19.2	**84**	**9**
1970	STL	14	14	45	952	21.2	79	5
1971	STL	14	14	42	837	19.9	54	3
1972	MIN	14	14	47	**1,035**	22.0	66	7
1973	MIN	14	14	42	907	21.6	54	8
1974	MIN	14	14	26	578	**22.2**	80	5
1975	MIN	14	14	50	777	15.5	46	7
1976	ATL	14	14	21	292	13.9	49	2
1977	CHI	2	0	0	0	0.0	0	0
1977	NOR	10	8	11	133	12.1	23	1
		151	126	382	7,056	18.5	84	48

=== Playoffs ===
Year	Team	Games		Receiving				
Year	Team	GP	GS	Rec	Yds	Avg	Lng	TD
1973	MIN	3	3	**8**	**143**	17.9	**54**	**3**
1974	MIN	3	3	5	103	**20.6**	38	2
1975	MIN	1	1	1	15	15.0	15	0
		7	7	14	261	18.6	54	5
