= Steve Lawson (American football) =

American football player (born 1949)

No. 68, 65
- Position: Guard

Personal information
- Born: January 4, 1949 (age 77); Athens, Georgia, U.S.
- Listed height: 6 ft 3 in (1.91 m)
- Listed weight: 265 lb (120 kg)

Career information
- High school: Chicago (IL) Mount Carmel
- College: Kansas
- NFL draft: 1971: 2nd round, 41st overall pick

Career history
- Cincinnati Bengals (1971–1972); Minnesota Vikings (1973–1975); San Francisco 49ers (1976–1977)

Awards and highlights
- First-team All-Big Eight (1970)

Career NFL statistics
- Games played: 64
- Games started: 28
- Fumble recoveries: 2
- Stats at Pro Football Reference

Stephen Wendell Lawson (born January 4, 1949) is an American former professional football player who was a guard for seven seasons in the National Football League (NFL). He played college football for the Kansas Jayhawks. He played in the NFL for the Cincinnati Bengals (1971–1972), Minnesota Vikings (1973–1975), and San Francisco 49ers (1976–1977).
