= Amos Martin =

American football player (born 1949)

No. 55, 50
- Position: Linebacker

Personal information
- Born: January 30, 1949 (age 77); Indianapolis, Indiana, U.S.
- Listed height: 6 ft 3 in (1.91 m)
- Listed weight: 228 lb (103 kg)

Career information
- College: Louisville
- NFL draft: 1972: 6th round, 154th overall pick

Career history
- Minnesota Vikings (1972–1976); Seattle Seahawks (1977)

Career NFL statistics
- Interceptions: 3
- Fumble recoveries: 1
- Defensive touchdowns: 1
- Stats at Pro Football Reference

Anthony Irl "Amos" Martin (born January 30, 1949) is an American former professional football player who was a linebacker in the National Football League (NFL). He played college football for the Louisville Cardinals before playing six seasons in the NFL for the Minnesota Vikings and the Seattle Seahawks.
