= Mirro Roder =

American football player (1944–2021)

Profile
- Position: K

Personal information
- Born: January 22, 1944; Olomouc, Protectorate of Bohemia and Moravia (now Czech Republic)
- Died: July 9, 2021 (aged 77); Czech Republic

Career information
- College: None
- NFL draft: 1972

Career history
- 1972–1974: Chicago Bears
- 1976: Tampa Bay Buccaneers
- Stats at Pro Football Reference

Mirro Roder (born Miroslav Rödr January 22, 1944 – July 9, 2021) was a former footballer and American football player of Czech descent.

The striker played for Dukla Prague in the Czechoslovak First League between 1963 and 1967. He scored 13 goals in 45 games. In 1968, Rödr emigrated to the United States and played under the name Mirro Roder as an American football placekicker in the National Football League. He played three seasons for the Chicago Bears, and two games for the expansion Tampa Bay Buccaneers in 1976 and missed all three field goals that he attempted with them. He was the first Czech player in the NFL (the town in which he was born is now part of the modern-day Czech Republic).

== Association Football ==
Rödr played for TJ MŽ Olomouc in his youth. In the 1962/63 season, the tall striker made it into the first team, which at that time played in Krajský přebor, which was located below the second highest division, and ended the season in a promotion place.

Rödr had already caught the eye of talent scouts from the capital city and initially played four test matches for Sparta Prague. Ultimately, the attacker with the powerful shot switched to the series champions Dukla Prague. After an initial adaptation phase, Rödr was part of Dukla's regular lineup in the 1964/65 season and scored five goals in 20 league games. However, the expectations at the top national club were higher and Rödr quickly lost his regular place. In the following two seasons, 1965/66 and 1966/67, he only played nine games with two and five goals respectively. For the 1967/68 season, the former talent was only in the squad of the B team and subsequently agreed on a move to the then second division team VTŽ Chomutov.

However, there was no further engagement in Chomutov. In the summer of 1968, following a honeymoon that the newlywed couple spent in Italy, Rödr went to Chicago and did not return to Czechoslovakia due to the violent suppression of the Prague Spring by Warsaw Pact troops.

== American Football ==
In Chicago, Rödr worked as a bricklayer and played association football for Sparta Chicago in his free time. In 1972 he successfully completed a trial training session with the NFL club Chicago Bears. In the first season, Rödr, who now appeared under the name Mirro Roder, was part of the Taxi Squad. In 1973 and 1974 he kicked important field goals for the Bears. In preparation for the 1975 season, Roder was injured and his NFL career seemed to be over after 27 games and 79 points.

In the spring of 1976, Roder signed a contract with the Cincinnati Bengals, but was released before the start of the season. Roder briefly moved to the league newcomer Tampa Bay Buccaneers. After two big losses and three failed field goal attempts, Roder's football career was finally over. Although he signed with the Cleveland Browns again in the summer of 1977, he left the team after an injury in training camp. Roder, who was naturalized in July 1977, played two test games for the Green Bay Packers, but was removed from the squad before the start of the season.

Mirro's daughter lives in the same Riverside, IL home he bought when he kicked for the Bears. After retiring he moved back to Czechoslovakia and got remarried. He died on July 9, 2021, at 77.
