= Oscar Reed =

American football player (born 1944)

No. 32, 30
- Position: Running back

Personal information
- Born: March 24, 1944 (age 82); Jonestown, Mississippi, U.S.
- Listed height: 6 ft 0 in (1.83 m)
- Listed weight: 222 lb (101 kg)

Career information
- High school: Booker T. Washington (Memphis, Tennessee)
- College: Colorado State
- NFL draft: 1968: 7th round, 167th overall pick

Career history
- Minnesota Vikings (1968–1974); Atlanta Falcons (1975)

Awards and highlights
- NFL champion (1969)

Career NFL statistics
- Rushing yards: 2,008
- Rushing average: 4
- Receptions: 94
- Receiving yards: 677
- Total touchdowns: 11
- Stats at Pro Football Reference

Oscar Reed (born March 24, 1944) is an American former professional football player who was a running back for the Minnesota Vikings and Atlanta Falcons of the National Football League (NFL). Reed played in Super Bowl IV, Super Bowl VIII, and Super Bowl IX. He played college football for the Colorado State Rams and was inducted into the Colorado State University Athletics Hall of Fame in 1993.
