= 1973 New York Giants season =

NFL team season

- General manager: Ray Walsh
- Head coach: Alex Webster
- Home stadium: Yankee Stadium (2 games), Yale Bowl (5 games)

Results
- Record: 2–11–1
- Division place: 5th NFC East
- Playoffs: Did not qualify
- Pro Bowlers: None

The 1973 New York Giants season was the franchise's 49th season in the National Football League (NFL). The season saw the Giants attempting to improve on their 8–6 record from 1972. However, the Giants suffered one of the worst seasons in franchise history, finishing 2–11–1.

The two wins were against the Houston Oilers and the St. Louis Cardinals while the tie was against archrival Philadelphia in week two. That was the last Giants game at Yankee Stadium, which underwent a multi-year renovation, requiring a temporary move to the Yale Bowl in Connecticut. Palmer Stadium at Princeton University in New Jersey had also been considered.

The Giants' two wins in 1973 equaled the second fewest the team had ever posted and it was their worst record since 1966 (1–12–1). To add injury to insult, former quarterback Fran Tarkenton, who was traded after the 1971 season, led the Minnesota Vikings (12–2) to the NFC title; they defeated the Giants 31–7 in the Yale Bowl in the regular season finale.

Fifth-year head coach Alex Webster, a longtime Giant running back, was forced to resign, replaced in mid-January by Bill Arnsparger, the defensive coordinator of the two-time Super Bowl champion Miami Dolphins.

The Giants were at the Yale Bowl again in 1974, moved to Shea Stadium in 1975 (co-tenant with the Jets, Mets, and Yankees), and to Giants Stadium in New Jersey in 1976.

== Offseason ==
=== Draft ===
1973 New York Giants draft
Round	Pick	Player	Position	College	Notes
2	40	Brad Van Pelt *	Linebacker	Michigan State	
3	69	Rich Glover	Defensive tackle	Nebraska	
5	119	Leon McQuay	RB	Tampa	
6	147	Wade Brantley	DT	Troy State	
7	172	Rod Freeman	TE	Vanderbilt	
8	198	George Hasenohrl	DT	Ohio State	
9	225	Ty Paine	QB	Washington State	
10	250	Walter Love	DB	Westminster	
11	275	William Wideman	DT	North Carolina A&T	
12	303	Ron Lumpkin	DB	Arizona State	
13	328	Clifton Davis	RB	Alcorn A&M	
14	353	Brian Kelley	LB	Cal Lutheran	
15	381	Carl Schaukowitch	G	Penn State	
16	406	Ben Nitka	P	Colorado College	
17	430	John Billizon	DE	Grambling State	
Made roster † Pro Football Hall of Fame * Made at least one Pro Bowl during career

=== Undrafted free agents ===
1973 undrafted free agents of note
Player	Position	College
Leo Gasienica	Quarterback	Rutgers

== Personnel ==
=== Staff / Coaches ===
1973 New York Giants staff
Front office: Co-Owner - Tim Mara; Co-Owner / President – Wellington Mara; General manager – Ray Walsh; Director of Player Personnel - Jim Lee Howell; Director of Pro Personnel – Jim Trimble; Scouts - Roosevelt Brown, Ken Kavanaugh, Allan Webb; Head coaches: Head coach – Alex Webster; Offensive coaches: Offensive Coordinator - Joe Walton; Quarterbacks / Wide Receivers - Joe Walton; Offensive Line – Ray Wietecha	Defensive coaches: Defensive Coordinator – Jim Garrett; Defensive Line – Jim Katcavage; Defensive Backs - Emlen Tunnell; Linebackers – Matt Hazeltine; Strength and conditioning: None - N/A

=== Roster ===
1973 New York Giants roster
Quarterbacks (QB): 11 Randy Johnson; 16 Norm Snead; Running backs (RB): 29 Vince Clements; 30 Ron Johnson; 49 Joe Orduna; 34 Jack Rizzo; 23 Johnny Roland; Wide receivers (WR): 27 Bob Grim; 85 Don Herrmann; 84 Rich Houston; Tight ends (TE): 83 Tom Gatewood; 38 Bob Tucker	Offensive linemen (OL): 60 Bart Buetow T; 65 Mark Ellison G; 62 Dick Enderle G; 52 John Hill T; 50 Bob Hyland C; 53 Greg Larson C; 63 Doug Van Horn G/T; 69 Willie Young T; Defensive linemen (DL): 79 Carter Campbell DE; 77 Rich Glover DT; 68 Dan Goich DT; 75 Larry Jacobson DE	Linebackers (LB): 51 John Douglas OLB; 58 Jim Files MLB; 56 Pat Hughes OLB; 55 Brian Kelley OLB; 80 Henry Reed OLB; 10 Brad Van Pelt OLB; Defensive backs (DB): 45 Pete Athas CB; 21 Otto Brown CB/S; 24 Chuck Crist SS; 44 Richmond Flowers SS; 22 Honor Jackson CB; 43 Spider Lockhart FS; 47 Ron Lumpkin SS; 41 Willie Williams CB; Special teams (ST): 11 Tom Blanchard P; 3 Pete Gogolak K	Practice squad: 81 Jack Gregory DE; 67 Ron Hornsby LB; 46 Walt Love WR; Reserve: -- Wade Brantley DT (IR); -- Clifton Davis RB (IR); 31 Charlie Evans RB (Susp.); 64 John Mendenhall DT (IR); 18 Eldridge Small CB (IR); 72 Joe Taffoni T (IR); 22 Rocky Thompson RB (IR); 71 Dave Tipton DE (IR); Rookies in italics

== Regular season ==
With Yankee Stadium undergoing refurbishment after the 1973 baseball season, the Giants played their final game there on September 23, against the Philadelphia Eagles, a 23–23 tie. The Giants played their final five home games that season at the Yale Bowl in New Haven, Connecticut. On November 18, they defeated the St. Louis Cardinals 24–13, their only victory ever recorded at Yale Bowl. They were winless in seven home games there in 1974, and moved to Shea Stadium for one season in 1975.

=== Schedule ===
Week	Date	Opponent	Result	Record	Venue	Attendance
1	September 16	Houston Oilers	**W** 34–14	1–0	Yankee Stadium	57,979
2	September 23	**Philadelphia Eagles**	**T** 23–23	1–0–1	Yankee Stadium	62,289
3	September 30	at Cleveland Browns	**L** 10–12	1–1–1	Cleveland Municipal Stadium	76,065
4	October 7	Green Bay Packers	**L** 14–16	1–2–1	Yale Bowl	70,050
5	October 14	**Washington Redskins**	**L** 3–21	1–3–1	Yale Bowl	70,168
6	October 21	at **Dallas Cowboys**	**L** 28–45	1–4–1	Texas Stadium	58,741
7	October 28	at **St. Louis Cardinals**	**L** 27–35	1–5–1	Busch Memorial Stadium	47,589
8	November 4	at Oakland Raiders	**L** 0–42	1–6–1	Oakland–Alameda County Coliseum	51,200
9	November 11	**Dallas Cowboys**	**L** 10–23	1–7–1	Yale Bowl	70,128
10	November 18	**St. Louis Cardinals**	**W** 24–13	2–7–1	Yale Bowl	65,795
11	November 25	at **Philadelphia Eagles**	**L** 16–20	2–8–1	Veterans Stadium	63,086
12	December 2	at **Washington Redskins**	**L** 24–27	2–9–1	RFK Stadium	53,590
13	December 10	at Los Angeles Rams	**L** 6–40	2–10–1	Los Angeles Memorial Coliseum	73,328
14	December 16	Minnesota Vikings	**L** 7–31	2–11–1	Yale Bowl	70,041
Note: Intra-division opponents are in **bold** text.

=== Standings ===
NFC East
	W	L	T	PCT	DIV	CONF	PF	PA	STK
Dallas Cowboys	10	4	0	.714	6–2	8–3	382	203	W3
Washington Redskins	10	4	0	.714	6–2	8–3	325	198	W1
Philadelphia Eagles	5	8	1	.393	3–4–1	3–7–1	310	393	L1
St. Louis Cardinals	4	9	1	.321	3–5	4–7	286	365	L1
New York Giants	2	11	1	.179	1–6–1	1–9–1	226	362	L4

NFC Central
	W	L	T	PCT	DIV	CONF	PF	PA	STK
Minnesota Vikings	12	2	0	.857	6–0	10–1	296	168	W2
Detroit Lions	6	7	1	.464	3–2–1	6–4–1	271	247	L1
Green Bay Packers	5	7	2	.429	1–4–1	4–6–1	202	259	W1
Chicago Bears	3	11	0	.214	1–5	1–9	195	334	L6

NFC West
	W	L	T	PCT	DIV	CONF	PF	PA	STK
Los Angeles Rams	12	2	0	.857	5–1	9–2	388	178	W6
Atlanta Falcons	9	5	0	.643	4–2	7–4	318	224	W1
San Francisco 49ers	5	9	0	.357	2–4	4–7	262	319	L2
New Orleans Saints	5	9	0	.357	1–5	4–7	163	312	L1

== See also ==
- List of New York Giants seasons
