= 1972 Minnesota Vikings season =

NFL team season

- General manager: Jim Finks
- Head coach: Bud Grant
- Home stadium: Metropolitan Stadium

Results
- Record: 7–7
- Division place: 3rd NFC Central
- Playoffs: Did not qualify
- All-Pros: T Ron Yary (1st team); DE Carl Eller (2nd team); S Paul Krause (2nd team); DT Alan Page (2nd team)
- Pro Bowlers: WR John Gilliam; S Paul Krause; DT Alan Page; T Ron Yary

Uniform
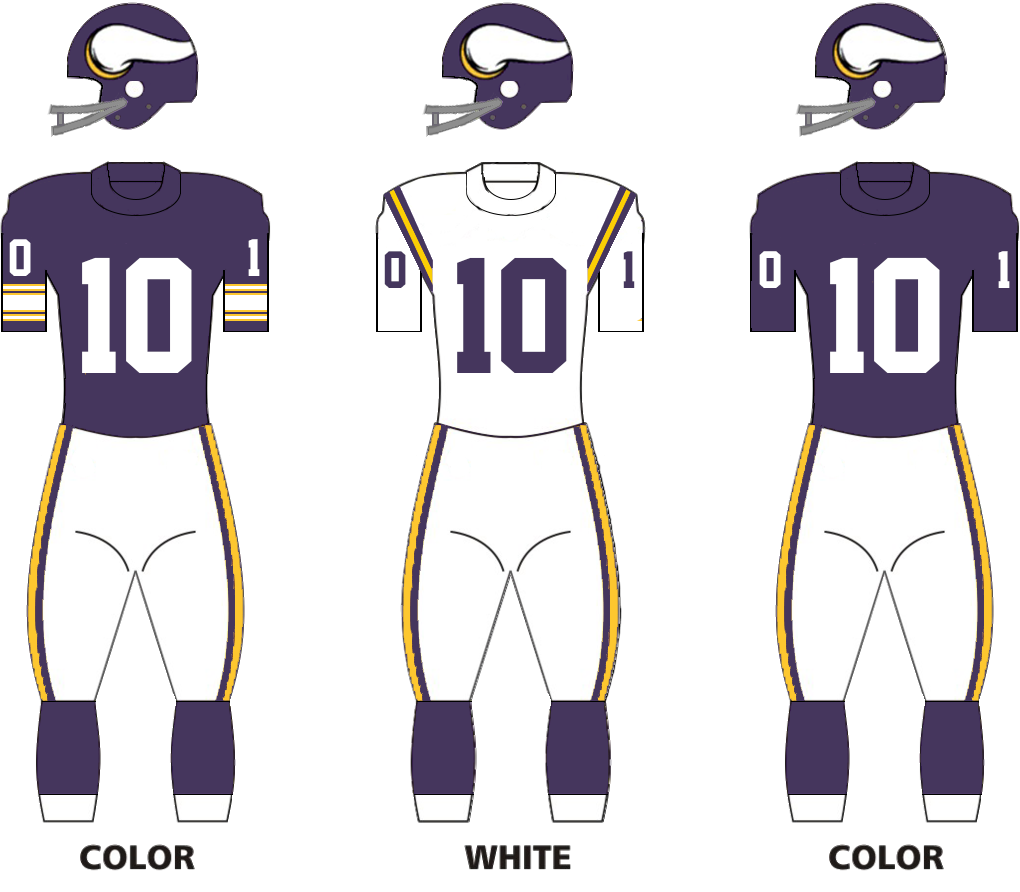

The 1972 season was the Minnesota Vikings' 12th in the National Football League. It marked the return of Fran Tarkenton to the Vikings after he had been traded to the New York Giants in 1967. In return, Minnesota sent three players to the Giants (Norm Snead, Bob Grim and Vince Clements), plus first- and second-round draft picks. Tarkenton's return also resulted in Gary Cuozzo, who had been with the team since 1968, being traded to the St. Louis Cardinals in a deal that sent wide receiver John Gilliam to the Vikings along with second- and fourth-round draft picks in 1973. Cardinals coach Bob Hollway was familiar with Cuozzo, having served as Minnesota's defensive coordinator under Bud Grant prior to leaving for St. Louis in 1971.

The Vikings finished with a record of seven wins and seven losses, 4 games worse than their 11–3 record from 1971. This would be one of only two times during the 1970s in which the Vikings failed to reach the playoffs, as they would win the NFC Central six consecutive seasons (1973–1978) before posting a 7–9 record in 1979. The Vikings started the season with just one win in their first four games, including a surprising 19–17 loss to the lightly regarded Cardinals in week four, when Gary Cuozzo bested his former team as Vikings kicker Fred Cox hit the upright on a potential game-winning field goal. The team recovered from their slow start, winning five of their next six to sit at 6–4. However, the Vikings would lose three of their final four games to finish the season at an even 7–7.

== Offseason ==
=== 1972 draft ===
Pro Bowler

1972 Minnesota Vikings Draft
Draft order		Player name	Position	College	Notes
Round	Selection	Player name	Position	College	Notes
1	10	Jeff Siemon	Linebacker	Stanford	from Patriots (Note: The Vikings received New England's first-round selection (10th overall), CB John Charles, and cash as compensation for free agent QB Joe Kapp.)
1	24	Traded to the New York Giants (Note: The Vikings traded their first-round selection (24th overall), a 1973 second-round selection (40th overall), QB Norm Snead, WR Bob Grim and RB Vince Clements to the Giants in exchange for QB Fran Tarkenton.)			
2	50	Ed Marinaro	Running back	Cornell	
3	59	Bart Buetow	Offensive tackle	Minnesota	from Packers (Note: The Vikings traded QB Zeke Bratkowski to the Packers in exchange for a third-round selection (59th overall).)
3	76	Traded to the Philadelphia Eagles (Note: The Vikings traded their third-round selection (76th overall), a 1971 second- and sixth-round selections (50th and 154th overall) and OT Steve Smith to the Eagles in exchange for QB Norm Snead.)			
4	102	Traded to the Denver Broncos (Note: The Vikings traded their fourth-round selection (102nd overall) and CB John Charles to the Broncos in exchange for WR Al Denson.)			
5	128	Traded to the Los Angeles Rams (Note: The Vikings traded their fifth-round selection (128th overall) to the Rams in exchange for CB Ted Provost.)			
6	154	Amos Martin	Linebacker	Louisville	
7	181	Bill Slater	Defensive end	Western Michigan	Originally Dolphins pick (Note: The Vikings originally had 180th overall but passed, allowing the Dolphins to move up and Minnesota selected in the 181st overall pick.)
8	206	Calvin Demery	Wide receiver	Arizona State	
9	232	Charlie Goodrum	Guard	Florida A&M	
10	258	Willie Aldridge	Running back	South Carolina State	
11	284	Willie McKelton	Defensive back	Southern	
12	310	Bob Banaugh	Defensive back	Montana State	
13	336	Franklin Roberts	Running back	Alcorn A&M	
14	361	Marv Owens	Running back	San Diego State	
15	388	Mike Sivert	Guard	East Tennessee State	
16	414	Neil Graff	Quarterback	Wisconsin	
17	440	Dick Schmalz	Wide receiver	Auburn	

== Roster ==
1972 Minnesota Vikings roster
Quarterbacks (QB): 19 Bob Lee; 10 Fran Tarkenton; Running backs (RB): 30 Bill Brown; 26 Clinton Jones; 21 Jim Lindsey; 49 Ed Marinaro; 41 Dave Osborn; 32 Oscar Reed; Wide receivers (WR): 27 Calvin Demery; 42 John Gilliam; 80 John Henderson; 84 Gene Washington; Tight ends (TE): 87 John Beasley; 83 Stu Voigt	Offensive linemen (OL): 67 Grady Alderman T; 71 Doug Davis T; 64 Milt Sunde G; 53 Mick Tingelhoff C; 72 John Ward G; 62 Ed White G; 73 Ron Yary T; 51 Godfrey Zaunbrecher C; Defensive linemen (DL): 81 Carl Eller DE; 77 Gary Larsen DT; 75 Bob Lurtsema DE/DT; 70 Jim Marshall DE; 88 Alan Page DT; 69 Doug Sutherland DT	Linebackers (LB): 56 Carl Gersbach OLB; 58 Wally Hilgenberg OLB; 55 Amos Martin OLB; 50 Jeff Siemon MLB; 59 Lonnie Warwick MLB; 60 Roy Winston OLB; Defensive backs (DB): 24 Terry Brown FS; 20 Bobby Bryant CB; 29 Karl Kassulke SS; 22 Paul Krause FS; 40 Charlie West CB; 23 Jeff Wright SS; 43 Nate Wright CB; Special teams (ST): 14 Fred Cox K; 11 Mike Eischeid P	Practice squad: Neil Graff QB; Charlie Goodrum G; Rookies in italics

== Preseason ==
Week	Date	Opponent	Result	Record	Venue	Attendance
1	August 12	San Diego Chargers	W 24–13	1–0	Metropolitan Stadium	47,900
2	August 18	at Buffalo Bills	L 10–21	1–1	War Memorial Stadium	41,006
3	August 26	at Cleveland Browns	W 20–17	2–1	Cleveland Stadium	70,583
4	September 4	Houston Oilers	W 26–14	3–1	Metropolitan Stadium	47,900
5	September 10	at Miami Dolphins	L 19–21	3–2	Miami Orange Bowl	74,298

== Regular season ==
=== Schedule ===
Week	Date	Opponent	Result	Record	Venue	Attendance
1	September 18	Washington Redskins	L 21–24	0–1	Metropolitan Stadium	47,900
2	September 24	at Detroit Lions	W 34–10	1–1	Tiger Stadium	54,418
3	October 1	Miami Dolphins	L 14–16	1–2	Metropolitan Stadium	47,900
4	October 8	St. Louis Cardinals	L 17–19	1–3	Metropolitan Stadium	49,687
5	October 15	at Denver Broncos	W 23–20	2–3	Mile High Stadium	51,656
6	October 23	at Chicago Bears	L 10–13	2–4	Soldier Field	55,701
7	October 29	at Green Bay Packers	W 27–13	3–4	Lambeau Field	56,263
8	November 5	New Orleans Saints	W 37–6	4–4	Metropolitan Stadium	49,784
9	November 12	Detroit Lions	W 16–14	5–4	Metropolitan Stadium	49,784
10	November 19	at Los Angeles Rams	W 45–41	6–4	Los Angeles Memorial Coliseum	77,982
11	November 26	at Pittsburgh Steelers	L 10–23	6–5	Three Rivers Stadium	50,348
12	December 3	Chicago Bears	W 23–10	7–5	Metropolitan Stadium	49,784
13	December 10	Green Bay Packers	L 7–23	7–6	Metropolitan Stadium	49,784
14	December 16	at San Francisco 49ers	L 17–20	7–7	Candlestick Park	61,214

=== Game summaries ===
==== Week 3: vs. Miami Dolphins ====
The Dolphins traveled to Metropolitan Stadium in Minnesota for a match against the Vikings in week 3. Miami trailed Minnesota for much of the game. In the first quarter, the Vikings scored a touchdown via a 56-yard pass from quarterback Fran Tarkenton to wide receiver John Gilliam. With no further scoring in the first or second quarters, the Vikings led 7–0 at halftime. As Tarkenton attempted another pass to Gilliam early in the third quarter, cornerback Tim Foley intercepted and returned the ball to Minnesota's 37-yard line. Dolphins kicker Garo Yepremian kicked a 51-yard field goal and later a 42-yard field goal with 5:23 left in the third quarter after Miami re-gained possession. The Vikings then executed an 80-yard, 13-play drive which consumed all time remaining in the third quarter.

As the fourth quarter started, Minnesota scored a touchdown via a 1-yard run by running back Bill Brown, with the score being 14–6. After the Dolphins re-gained possession, Vikings linebacker Roy Winston intercepted Bob Griese. However, the No-Name Defense stopped Minnesota's subsequent drive with two sacks on Tarkenton. Miami's next drive, which included a 22-yard double reverse pass from wide receiver Marlin Briscoe to tight end Jim Mandich, ended with a 51-yard field goal by Yepremian. The Dolphins defense then stalled the Vikings next drive and took possession at the Miami 41-yard line. After 39 seconds, 6 plays, and a penalty for roughing the passer, Miami scored a touchdown – a 3-yard pass from Grise to Mandich. The Dolphins thus took a 16–14 lead. With one minute and twenty-eight seconds left, the Vikings attempted to reach field goal range. With little time left, Tarkenton threw a Hail Mary pass at the Minnesota 28-yard line, but was intercepted by Dolphins defensive back Lloyd Mumphord. Miami won by a score of 16–14, sacking Tarkenton five times, and improved to 3–0.

==== Week 11: at Pittsburgh Steelers ====
Week 11: Minnesota Vikings at Pittsburgh Steelers – Game summary

Quarter	1	2	3	4	Total
Vikings	3	0	0	7	10
Steelers	7	0	3	13	23

at Three Rivers Stadium, Pittsburgh, Pennsylvania

- Date: November 26
- Game time: 1:00 p.m. EDT
- Game weather: 38 °F (3 °C)
- Game attendance: 50,348
- TV announcers (CBS): Jack Drees, George Connor, and Andy Musser
- Pro-Football-Reference.com

Game information

First quarter

- MIN – Fred Cox 24-yard field goal. Vikings 3–0.
- PIT – Franco Harris 12-yard run (Roy Gerela kick). Steelers 7–0.

Second quarter

- No scoring plays.

Third quarter

- PIT – Roy Gerela 17-yard field goal. Steelers 10–3.

Fourth quarter

- MIN – Stu Voigt 5-yard pass from Fran Tarkenton (Fred Cox kick). Tied 10–10.
- PIT – Terry Bradshaw 1-yard run (kick blocked). Steelers 16–10.
- PIT – Frank Lewis 17-yard pass from Terry Bradshaw (Roy Gerela kick). Steelers 23–10.

Top passers

- MIN – Fran Tarkenton – 24/43, 235 yards, TD, INT
- PIT – Terry Bradshaw – 7/19, 93 yards, TD, INT

Top rushers

- MIN – Oscar Reed – 16 rushes, 56 yards
- PIT – Franco Harris – 17 rushes, 128 yards, TD

Top receivers

- MIN – Ed Marinaro – 9 receptions, 62 yards
- PIT – Ron Shanklin – 2 receptions, 52 yards

Pittsburgh came into the game 5–0 at home for the season, while Minnesota was riding a four-game win streak. It was quite windy in the stadium at gametime, as the ball blew off the tee twice during the opening kickoff. Once it was kicked, the Vikings began with a good return to their own 45-yard line, but went three-and-out. They got the ball back quickly on the Steelers' opening drive, as John Fuqua fumbled the ball on a bad exchange, recovered by Carl Eller at the Pittsburgh 20. The possession led to a 24-yard field goal after Minnesota only gained three yards. The Vikings followed with a low kickoff due to the wind conditions, and Pittsburgh started again from their own 48, but punted without a first down. The Vikings got the game rolling in an unusual way, extending their possession when Ed Marinaro fumbled a catch and teammate John Gilliam ran it across the 50-yard line. Despite a good drive, the Vikings were held scoreless after failing to gain a foot on a fourth down attempt at the 8. The Steelers then punted again, and late in the first quarter got a turnover at the Vikings' 12 when Bill Brown fumbled. Franco Harris scored untouched on the next play.

The Vikings continued their miscues in the second quarter, as their possession stalled with penalties and the snap was bobbled on the punt, although punter Mike Eischeid performed a fantastic improvised punt while scrambling. It began raining at this point, and after a Steelers punt, the Vikings drove all the way to the 4-yard line, only to settle for a bobbled field goal attempt for a turnover. The Steelers gave it back on an interception by Charlie West, but a field goal attempt by the Vikings from 50 missed badly. The half ended with the Steelers holding a 7–3 lead despite the Vikings holding a 140–84 edge in total yards.

The second half started with a Steelers punt, and then a Vikings punt which the Steelers fumbled at their own 47 after a good return. The Vikings recovered and drove to the 7-yard line but, incredibly, they again bobbled a field goal attempt and again failed to gain any points. On the following Steelers possession, they hit on a big play with a swing pass to Ron Shanklin, which went from their own 39 to the Vikings 19 and set up a field goal. The teams each traded punts twice, until the Vikings neared the goal line again on a 63-yard catch-and-run by John Gilliam. They finally found the end zone with the next play on a swing pass to tight end Stu Voigt, tying the score at 10–10 with about nine minutes left in the fourth quarter.

The Steelers quickly responded with a 61-yard Franco Harris run to the 1-yard line, giving Harris 100-plus rushing yards for the fifth consecutive game. The Steelers scored with a QB sneak by Terry Bradshaw on the following play. The extra point was blocked, and the Steelers led 16–10. They quickly got the ball back, taking Minnesota's punt to the Vikings 39, but were held to a missed field goal attempt. The Vikings then took their last meaningful shot, but failed on fourth down at their own 29. The Steelers then sealed the game with a touchdown catch by Frank Lewis, making the final 23–10.

=== Standings ===
NFC Central
	W	L	T	PCT	DIV	CONF	PF	PA	STK
Green Bay Packers	10	4	0	.714	5–1	8–3	304	226	W3
Detroit Lions	8	5	1	.607	2–4	6–5	339	290	W1
Minnesota Vikings	7	7	0	.500	4–2	6–5	301	252	L2
Chicago Bears	4	9	1	.321	1–5	3–7–1	225	275	L1

== Awards, records, and honors ==
=== All-Pros ===
First team

- OT Ron Yary (AP)

Second team

- OT Ron Yary (NEA-2, PFWA-2)
- DE Carl Eller (AP-2)
- DT Alan Page (AP-2, NEA-2, PFWA-2)
- S Paul Krause (AP-2)

=== Pro Bowlers ===
- WR John Gilliam
- OT Ron Yary
- DT Alan Page
- FS Paul Krause

=== League leaders ===
- John Gilliam – Yards per reception (22.0)

== Statistics ==
=== Team leaders ===
Category	Player(s)	Value
Passing yards	Fran Tarkenton	2,651
Passing touchdowns	Fran Tarkenton	18
Rushing yards	Oscar Reed	639
Rushing touchdowns	Bill Brown	4
Receiving yards	John Gilliam	1,035
Receiving touchdowns	John Gilliam	7
Points	Fred Cox	97
Kickoff return yards	John Gilliam	369
Punt return yards	Charlie West	111
Interceptions	Paul Krause	6

=== League rankings ===
Category	Total yards	Yards per game	NFL rank (out of 26)
Passing offense	2,523	180.2	4th
Rushing offense	1,740	124.3	20th
Total offense	4,263	304.5	12th
Passing defense	1,699	121.4	1st
Rushing defense	2,002	143.0	16th
Total defense	3,701	264.4	5th
