= List of Western Carolina Catamounts in the NFL draft =

The Western Carolina Catamounts football team has had eight players drafted into the National Football League. Three former Western Carolina football players have been selected to play in a Pro Bowl and one has been named an First-team All-Pro selection.

== Selections ==
Western Carolina Catamounts in the NFL Draft
Year	Round	Overall	Player	Position	Team	Notes
1972	10	252	Steve Williams	DE	San Francisco 49ers	
1982	10	259	Eddie McGill	TE	St. Louis Cardnials	
1985	11	305	Louis Cooper	LB	Seattle Seahawks	
1986	9	233	Clyde Simmons	DE	Philadelphia Eagles	2x Pro Bowl, 2x First-team All-Pro
1988	5	135	Kirk Roach	K	Buffalo Bills	
1993	6	162	Willie Williams	DB	Pittsburgh Steelers	Super Bowl XL champion
1994	6	179	Andrew Jordan	TE	Minnesota Vikings	
2018	7	243	Keion Crossen	CB	New England Patriots	Super Bowl LIII champion
