= 1973 Philadelphia Eagles season =

NFL team season

- Owner: Leonard Tose
- Head coach: Mike McCormack
- Home stadium: Veterans Stadium

Results
- Record: 5–8–1
- Division place: 3rd NFC East
- Playoffs: Did not qualify
- Pro Bowlers: TE Charle Young; WR Harold Carmichael; QB Roman Gabriel; PR Bill Bradley

The 1973 Philadelphia Eagles season was the franchise's 41st in the National Football League. Although they improved upon their 2–11–1 record of the previous season, they failed to complete a winning record for the seventh consecutive season and failed to reach the playoffs for the thirteenth straight year.

== Offseason ==
At the conclusion of the 1972 season, Philadelphia Eagles' head coach Ed Khayat was dismissed from his position. Shortly after, the team hired Mike McCormack, who had previously served as an assistant coach for the Washington Redskins between 1965 and 1972, as the new head coach.

The Eagles moved their training camp from Albright College in Reading, Pennsylvania, to Widener University in Chester, Pennsylvania, a short distance from Veterans Stadium.

=== NFL draft ===
= Pro Bowler (Note: Players are identified as Pro Bowlers if they were selected for the Pro-Bowl at any time in their career.)	= Hall of Famer

Rd	PICK	PLAYER	POSITION	SCHOOL
1	3	Jerry Sisemore	OT	Texas
1	6 (Note: This pick was traded to the Eagles from the San Diego Chargers.)	Charle Young	TE	USC
2	28	Guy W. Morriss	G	TCU
3	55	Randy Logan	DB	Michigan
6	132	Bob Picard	WR	Eastern Washington
7	159	Will Wynn	DE	Tennessee State
8	184	Dan Linter	DB	Indiana
9	211	John Nokes	LB	Northern Illinois
11	263	Gary van Elst	DT	Michigan State
12	288	Joe Lavender	CB	San Diego State
13	315	Stan Davis	WR	Memphis State
14	340	Ralph Sacra	T	Texas A&M
15	367	Ken Schlezes	DB	Notre Dame
16	392	Frank Dowsing	DB	Mississippi State
17	419	Greg Oliver	RB	Trinity

== Personnel ==
=== Staff / Coaches ===
1973 Philadelphia Eagles staff
Front office: Owner – Leonard Tose; General manager – Jim Murray; Head coaches: Head coach – Mike McCormack; Offensive coaches: Offensive Passing Game Coordinator - Boyd Dowler; Running Backs – John Idzik; Wide Receivers – Dick Coury; Offensive Line – John Sandusky	Defensive coaches: Defensive Coordinator – Walt Michaels; Defensive Line – Jerry Wampfler; Linebackers - Walt Michaels; Defensive Backs / Secondary – John Mazur; Special teams coaches: Special Teams Assistant – Dick LeBeau

=== Roster ===
1973 Philadelphia Eagles roster
Quarterbacks (QB): 5 Roman Gabriel; 7 John Reaves; Running backs (RB): 31 Tom Bailey; 46 Lee Bouggess; 36 Norm Bulaich; 27 Po James; 48 Greg Oliver; 25 Tom Sullivan; Wide receivers (WR): 17 Harold Carmichael; 21 Wes Chesson; 81 Stan Davis; 82 Bob Picard; 80 Don Zimmerman; Tight ends (TE): 87 Kent Kramer; 86 Charle Young	Offensive linemen (OL): 59 Mike Evans C; 72 Wade Key G; 66 Roy Kirksey G; 63 Tom Luken G; 62 Guy Morriss C; 68 Mark Nordquist G; 76 Jerry Sisemore T; 74 Steve Smith T; 73 Dick Stevens T; Defensive linemen (DL): 61 Bill Dunstan DT; 84 Richard Harris DT; 83 Don Hultz DE; 88 Gary Pettigrew DT; 77 Gerry Philbin DE; 75 Dennis Wirgowski DE	Linebackers (LB): 56 Dean Halverson OLB; 85 Marlin McKeever MLB; 52 Kevin Reilly OLB; 54 Tom Roussel OLB; 96 John Sodaski OLB; Defensive backs (DB): 39 Kermit Alexander SS; 29 Bill Bradley FS/P; 8 Al Coleman FS; 30 Joe Lavender CB; 41 Randy Logan SS; 20 John Outlaw CB; Special teams (ST): 19 Tom Dempsey K; 12 Tom McNeill P	Practice squad: 11 Rick Arrington QB; -- Roger Williams CB; Reserve: 95 John Bunting LB (IR); 18 Ben Hawkins WR (IR); 80 Clark Hoss TE (IR); 6 Jim Maxwell QB (IR); 26 Al Nelson CB (IR); 67 Vernon Winfield G (IR); 71 Will Wynn DE (IR); 89 Steve Zabel LB (IR); Rookies in italics

== Regular season ==
=== Schedule ===
Week	Date	Opponent	Result	Attendance
1	September 16	**St. Louis Cardinals**	**L** 34–23	61,103
2	September 23	at **New York Giants**	**T** 23–23	62,289
3	September 30	**Washington Redskins**	**L** 28–7	64,147
4	October 7	at Buffalo Bills	**L** 27–26	72,364
5	October 14	at **St. Louis Cardinals**	**W** 27–24	44,400
6	October 21	at Minnesota Vikings	**L** 28–21	47,478
7	October 28	**Dallas Cowboys**	**W** 30–16	63,300
8	November 4	New England Patriots	**W** 24–23	65,070
9	November 11	Atlanta Falcons	**L** 44–27	63,114
10	November 18	at **Dallas Cowboys**	**L** 31–10	59,375
11	November 25	**New York Giants**	**W** 20–16	63,086
12	December 2	at San Francisco 49ers	**L** 38–28	51,155
13	December 9	New York Jets	**W** 24–23	34,621
14	December 16	at **Washington Redskins**	**L** 38–20	49,484

Note: Intra-division opponents are in bold text.

=== Game summaries ===
==== Week 2 ====
On September 23, the Eagles and the New York Giants played in the final Giants game at Yankee Stadium. The game resulted in a 23–23 tie.

==== Week 5 ====
Team	1	2	3	4	Total
• Eagles	0	7	3	17	27
Cardinals	0	3	14	7	24

- Date: October 14
- Location: Busch Stadium, St. Louis, Missouri
- Game start: 1:00 p.m.
- Game attendance: 44,400
- Game weather: 63 °F (17.2 °C), wind 8 miles per hour (13 km/h; 7.0 kn)

Scoring summary
2	PHI	Harold Carmichael 1 yard pass from Roman Gabriel (Tom Dempsey kick)	Eagles 7–0
2	STL	Jim Bakken 39 yard field goal	Eagles 7–3
3	STL	Donny Anderson 21 yard run (Jim Bakken kick)	Cardinals 10–7
3	PHI	Tom Dempsey 32 yard field goal	Tie 10 – 10
3	STL	Ahmad Rashad 9 yard pass from Jim Hart (Jim Bakken kick)	Cardinals 17–10
4	PHI	Tom Dempsey 23 yard field goal	Cardinals 17–13
4	STL	Ahmad Rashad 65 yard pass from Jim Hart (Jim Bakken kick)	Cardinals 24–13
4	PHI	Harold Carmichael 27 yard pass from Roman Gabriel (Tom Dempsey kick)	Cardinals 24–20
4	PHI	Don Zimmerman 24 yard pass from Roman Gabriel (Tom Dempsey kick)	Eagles 27–24

==== Week 8 ====
Team	1	2	3	4	Total
Patriots	7	3	7	6	23
• Eagles	0	0	21	3	24

- Date: November 4
- Location: Veterans Stadium
- Game start: 1:00 p.m. EST

Scoring summary
Q1	NE	Stingley 16 yard pass from Plunkett (White kick)	NE 7–0
Q2	NE	White 33 yard field goal	NE 10–0
Q3	NE	Stingley 14 yard pass from Plunkett (White kick)	NE 17–0
Q3	PHI	Young 20 yard pass from Gabriel (Dempsey kick)	NE 17–7
Q3	PHI	Young 7 yard pass from Gabriel (Dempsey kick)	NE 17–14
Q3	PHI	Wynn 24 yard fumble return (Dempsey kick)	PHI 21–17
Q4	NE	Cunningham 4 yard run (kick failed)	NE 23–21
Q4	PHI	Dempsey 12 yard field goal	PHI 24–23

=== Standings ===
NFC East
	W	L	T	PCT	DIV	CONF	PF	PA	STK
Dallas Cowboys	10	4	0	.714	6–2	8–3	382	203	W3
Washington Redskins	10	4	0	.714	6–2	8–3	325	198	W1
Philadelphia Eagles	5	8	1	.393	3–4–1	3–7–1	310	393	L1
St. Louis Cardinals	4	9	1	.321	3–5	4–7	286	365	L1
New York Giants	2	11	1	.179	1–6–1	1–9–1	226	362	L4

== Awards and honors ==
- Roman Gabriel, quarterback, NFL Leader, 3,219 passing yards
- Roman Gabriel, NFL Leader, 23 touchdown passes
- Roman Gabriel, NFL Comeback Player of the Year Award
