= List of UT Martin Skyhawks in the NFL draft =

This is a list of UT Martin Skyhawks football players in the NFL draft.

== Key ==
B	Back	K	Kicker	NT	Nose tackle
C	Center	LB	Linebacker	FB	Fullback
DB	Defensive back	P	Punter	HB	Halfback
DE	Defensive end	QB	Quarterback	WR	Wide receiver
DT	Defensive tackle	RB	Running back	G	Guard
E	End	T	Offensive tackle	TE	Tight end

= Pro Bowler
= Hall of Famer

== Selections ==
Year	Round	Pick	Overall	Player	Team	Position
1967	4	18	98	Joe Taffoni	Cleveland Browns	T
1967	7	17	176	Ron Lewellen	Oakland Raiders	DT
1968	4	8	91	Gordon Lambert	Denver Broncos	LB
1969	3	1	53	Julian Nunamaker	Buffalo Bills	DE
1972	4	7	85	Mike Crangle	New Orleans Saints	DE
1978	8	22	216	David Williams	Atlanta Falcons	DB
1989	8	12	207	John Burch	Phoenix Cardinals	RB
1989	9	16	207	William Mackall	Indianapolis Colts	WR
1989	10	16	267	Emanuel McNeil	New England Patriots	DT
1989	11	20	299	Jerome Rinehart	New England Patriots	LB
1996	2	17	47	Fred Thomas	Seattle Seahawks	CB
2013	5	6	139	Montori Hughes	Indianapolis Colts	DT
2023	7	11	228	Colton Dowell	Tennessee Titans	WR

== Notable undrafted players ==
Note: No drafts held before 1936

Debut year	Player name	Position	Debut NFL/AFL team	Notes
2013	Quentin Sims	WR	New England Patriots	—
2014	Jeremy Butler	WR	Baltimore Ravens	—
2020	Jaylon Moore	WR	Baltimore Ravens	—
2022	Rodney Williams	TE	Denver Broncos	—
2023	Dresser Winn	QB	Los Angeles Rams	—
