= 1972 New Orleans Saints season =

NFL team season

- Owner: John W. Mecom Jr.
- Head coach: J. D. Roberts
- Home stadium: Tulane Stadium

Results
- Record: 2–11–1
- Division place: 4th NFC West
- Playoffs: Did not qualify
- Pro Bowlers: None

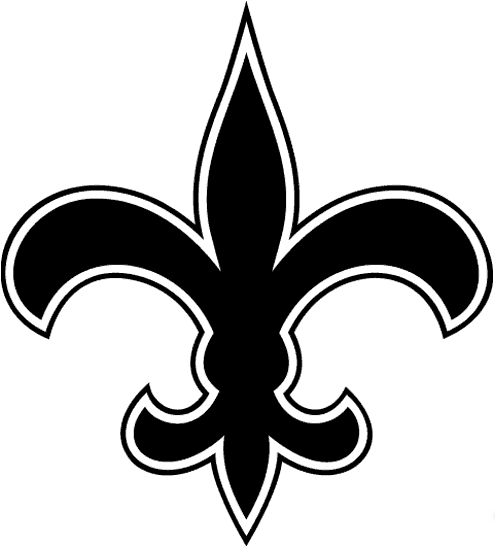
New Orleans Saints logo (1967 - 1999)

The 1972 New Orleans Saints season was the team's sixth as a member of the National Football League (NFL). They failed to improve on their previous season’s output of 4–8–2, winning only two games. The team failed to qualify for the playoffs for the sixth consecutive season.

The Saints suffered through their second 2–11–1 season in three years, tying with the Philadelphia Eagles for the second worst record in the league, only surpassed by the Houston Oilers’ 1–13. Coincidentally, one of the Saints' two wins came at the Eagles' expense. It would be their worst until they went 2–12 in 1975.

== Offseason ==
=== NFL draft ===
1972 New Orleans Saints draft
| Round | Pick | Player | Position | College | Notes |
| 1 | 8 | Royce Smith | Guard | Georgia | |
| 2 | 31 | Willie Hall | Linebacker | USC | |
| 3 | 60 | Bob Kuziel | Center | Pittsburgh | |
| 3 | 74 | Tom Myers * | Safety | Syracuse | |
| 4 | 85 | Mike Crangle | Defensive end | Tennessee-Martin | |
| 4 | 99 | Joe Federspiel | Linebacker | Kentucky | |
| 4 | 101 | Mike Coleman | Defensive end | Knoxville College | |
| 5 | 111 | Bill Butler | Running back | Kansas State | |
| 5 | 112 | Carl Johnson | Guard | Nebraska | Played offensive tackle in college |
| 5 | 126 | Bob Davies | Defensive back | South Carolina | |
| 6 | 137 | Wayne Dorton | Guard | Arkansas State | |
| 6 | 150 | Curt Watson | Running back | Tennessee | |
| 7 | 164 | Ernie Jackson | Defensive back | Duke | |
| 8 | 189 | Ron Vinson | Wide receiver | Abilene Christian | |
| 9 | 216 | Kent Branstetter | Defensive tackle | Houston | |
| 10 | 241 | Andy Kupp | Guard | Idaho | |
| 11 | 267 | Paul Dongieux | Linebacker | Mississippi | |
| 12 | 293 | Steve Lockhart | Tight end | Arkansas State | |
| 13 | 320 | Cephus Weatherspoon | Wide receiver | Fort Lewis | |
| 14 | 345 | Steve Barrios | Wide receiver | Tulane | |
| 15 | 372 | Rusty Lachaussee | Quarterback | Tulane | |
| 16 | 397 | Joe Balthrop | Guard | Tennessee | |
Made roster * Made at least one Pro Bowl during career

== Personnel ==
=== Staff ===
1972 New Orleans Saints staff
| Front office: President – John W. Mecom Jr.; Executive Vice President – Richard F. Gordon, Jr.; Head coaches: Head Coach – J. D. Roberts; Offensive coaches: Offensive Coordinator – Ken Shipp; Offensive Line – Jim Royer | Defensive coaches: Defensive Coordinator/Defensive Line – Jim Champion; Linebackers – Marv Matuszak; Defensive Backfield – Bud Whitehead |

=== Roster ===
1972 New Orleans Saints roster
| Quarterbacks (QB): 14 Edd Hargett; 8 Archie Manning; Running backs (RB): 38 Bill Butler; 28 James Ford; 35 Bob Gresham; 42 Jim Strong; 24 Joe Williams; Wide receivers (WR): 26 Margene Adkins; 41 Bob Newland; 86 Creston Whitaker; Tight ends (TE): 36 Robert Brown; 83 Dave Parks | Offensive linemen (OL): 51 John Didion C; 78 Glen Ray Hines T; 77 Carl Johnson G; 50 Jake Kupp G; 76 Don Morrison T; 70 Craig Robinson T; 61 Del Williams G; Defensive linemen (DL): 75 Mike Crangle DE; 89 Dave Long DE/DT; 74 Doug Mooers DT; 87 Richard Neal DE; 72 Joe Owens DE; 82 Bob Pollard DT | Linebackers (LB): 59 Wayne Colman OLB; 58 Joe Federspiel MLB; 56 Willie Hall OLB; 53 Bill Hobbs MLB; 52 Dick Palmer OLB; 54 Tom Roussel OLB; Defensive backs (DB): 29 Billie Hayes CB; 18 Hugo Hollas FS; 20 Delles Howell CB; 30 Ernie Jackson CB; 11 Bivian Lee CB; 37 Tom Myers FS; 23 Doug Wyatt SS; Special teams (ST): 10 Julian Fagan P; 9 Happy Feller K | Practice squad: 46 Danny Abramowicz WR; 7 Toni Linhart K; 44 Frank McGuigan RB; 47 Virgil Robinson RB; 12 Bobby Scott QB; 85 Cephus Weatherspoon WR; 68 Wimpy Winther C; Reserve: 34 Carlos Bell TE (IR); 25 Al Dodd WR (IR); 45 Art Green RB (IR); -- Tom Harrington TE (IR); 64 Ray Hester LB (IR); 65 Bob Kuziel C (IR); 22 Dee Martin CB (IR); 66 Royce Smith G (IR); 55 Tom Stincic LB (IR); Rookies in italics |

== Schedule ==
| Week | Date | Opponent | Result | Record | Venue | Attendance |
|---|---|---|---|---|---|---|
| 1 | September 17 | at **Los Angeles Rams** | **L** 14–34 | 0–1 | Los Angeles Memorial Coliseum | 66,303 |
| 2 | September 25 | Kansas City Chiefs | **L** 17–20 | 0–2 | Tulane Stadium | 70,793 |
| 3 | October 1 | **San Francisco 49ers** | **L** 2–37 | 0–3 | Tulane Stadium | 69,840 |
| 4 | October 8 | at New York Giants | **L** 21–45 | 0–4 | Yankee Stadium | 62,507 |
| 5 | October 15 | **Atlanta Falcons** | **L** 14–21 | 0–5 | Tulane Stadium | 66,294 |
| 6 | October 22 | at **San Francisco 49ers** | **T** 20–20 | 0–5–1 | Candlestick Park | 59,167 |
| 7 | October 29 | Philadelphia Eagles | **W** 21–3 | 1–5–1 | Tulane Stadium | 65,664 |
| 8 | November 5 | at Minnesota Vikings | **L** 6–37 | 1–6–1 | Metropolitan Stadium | 49,784 |
| 9 | November 12 | at **Atlanta Falcons** | **L** 20–36 | 1–7–1 | Atlanta Stadium | 58,850 |
| 10 | November 19 | at Detroit Lions | **L** 14–27 | 1–8–1 | Tiger Stadium | 53,752 |
| 11 | November 26 | **Los Angeles Rams** | **W** 19–16 | 2–8–1 | Tulane Stadium | 64,325 |
| 12 | December 3 | at New York Jets | **L** 17–18 | 2–9–1 | Shea Stadium | 62,496 |
| 13 | December 10 | New England Patriots | **L** 10–17 | 2–10–1 | Tulane Stadium | 64,889 |
| 14 | December 17 | Green Bay Packers | **L** 20–30 | 2–11–1 | Tulane Stadium | 65,881 |
Note: Intra-division opponents are in **bold** text.

=== Standings ===
NFC West
| | W | L | T | PCT | DIV | CONF | PF | PA | STK |
|---|---|---|---|---|---|---|---|---|---|
| San Francisco 49ers | 8 | 5 | 1 | .607 | 3–2–1 | 6–4–1 | 353 | 249 | W2 |
| Atlanta Falcons | 7 | 7 | 0 | .500 | 3–3 | 5–5 | 269 | 274 | L2 |
| Los Angeles Rams | 6 | 7 | 1 | .464 | 4–2 | 5–5–1 | 291 | 286 | L2 |
| New Orleans Saints | 2 | 11 | 1 | .179 | 1–4–1 | 2–8–1 | 215 | 361 | L3 |

== Notable events ==
- In their third game against the 49ers, the Saints became the thirty-second NFL team, and the first since the 1970 Cleveland Browns, to score only a safety in a full game. This was done again in the last week of the regular season by the San Diego Chargers, but after that was done only by the 1980 Buffalo Bills, the 1983 Minnesota Vikings, the 1993 Cincinnati Bengals, 2011 Atlanta Falcons (playoffs), and 2013 Jacksonville Jaguars.
- The regular season finale vs. Green Bay kicked off at noon CST instead of the usual 1 p.m. Noon would become the kickoff time for all home games in the early window beginning in 1982.
