= Rod Cason =

American football player (born 1950-2023)

Profile
- Position: Offensive tackle

Personal information
- Born: February 9, 1950 (age 76); San Angelo, Texas, U.S.
- Died: March 15, 2023 (aged 73); Nikiski, Alaska, U.S.

Career information
- College: Angelo State University
- College Football Hall of Fame

Rod Cason (February 9, 1950 - March 15, 2023) was an American former football offensive tackle. He played college football at Angelo State University in San Angelo, Texas from 1969 to 1971 where he was named twice named Associated Press "Second Team All-America" as well as being the first player named First Team NAIA All-America honors three consecutive times. He was elected to the College Football Hall of Fame in 2002. He was selected by the New England Patriots in the 11th round of the 1972 NFL draft.
