= Stan Davis (American football) =

American football player (born 1950)

No. 81
- Position: Wide receiver

Personal information
- Born: July 13, 1950 (age 76); Memphis, Tennessee, U.S.
- Listed height: 5 ft 10 in (1.78 m)
- Listed weight: 180 lb (82 kg)

Career information
- High school: Manassas (Memphis)
- College: Memphis State
- NFL draft: 1973: 13th round, 315th overall pick

Career history
- Philadelphia Eagles (1973)
- Stats at Pro Football Reference

Stanley Wayne Davis (born July 13, 1950) is an American former professional football wide receiver. He played eight games for the Philadelphia Eagles in 1973 season. Davis caught one pass for six yards, two punt returns for a total of four yards, and ten kick returns for a total of 242 yards (average of 23.6 yards and longest return of 28 yards). He debuted on Sunday October 14, 1973 against the St. Louis Cardinals and played his last game on 2 December 1973 against the San Francisco 49ers, where he had his only pass return for his NFL career.

He played college football at University of Memphis.
