= Solomon Freelon =

American gridiron football player (1951–2021)

Profile
- Position: Guard

Personal information
- Born: February 19, 1951; Monroe, Louisiana, U.S.
- Died: March 10, 2021 (aged 70)
- Listed height: 6 ft 2 in (1.88 m)
- Listed weight: 250 lb (113 kg)

Career information
- High school: Carroll (LA)
- College: Grambling State
- NFL draft: 1972: 3rd round, 75th overall pick

Career history
- 1972–1974: Houston Oilers (NFL)
- 1975–1976: Edmonton Eskimos (CFL)

Awards and highlights
- Grey Cup champion (1975); First-team Little All-American (1971)
- Stats at Pro Football Reference

Solomon Freelon, Jr. (February 19, 1951 – March 10, 2021) was an American gridiron football player who played in the CFL and NFL for the Edmonton Eskimos and Houston Oilers. He won the Grey Cup with Edmonton in 1975. He played college football at Grambling State University.
