= Mike Walker (kicker) =

English-born American football player (born 1958)

No. 12
- Position: Kicker

Personal information
- Born: October 18, 1949 (age 77); Lancaster, United Kingdom
- Listed height: 6 ft 0 in (1.83 m)
- Listed weight: 190 lb (86 kg)

Career information
- NFL draft: 1972: undrafted

Career history
- New England Patriots (1972)
- Stats at Pro Football Reference

Michael R. Walker (born October 18, 1949) is a former American football kicker. He played for the New England Patriots in 1972.
