= Willie Postler =

Canadian football player (born 1949)

Profile
- Positions: Center, Guard

Personal information
- Born: March 28, 1949 (age 77); Vienna, Austria
- Listed height: 6 ft 6 in (1.98 m)
- Listed weight: 260 lb (118 kg)

Career information
- College: Montana
- NFL draft: 1972: 9th round, 212th overall pick

Career history
- 1972: BC Lions
- 1974: Hamilton Tiger-Cats
- 1975: Edmonton Eskimos

Awards and highlights
- Grey Cup champion (1975)

Willie Postler (born March 28, 1949) is a former Canadian football player who played for the Hamilton Tiger-Cats, Edmonton Eskimos, and BC Lions. He played college football at the University of Montana.
