= Larry Horton =

American football player (born 1949)

No. 64
- Positions: Defensive end, defensive tackle

Personal information
- Born: April 29, 1949 (age 77); Gary, Indiana, U.S.
- Listed height: 6 ft 4 in (1.93 m)
- Listed weight: 248 lb (112 kg)

Career information
- High school: Froebel (Gary)
- College: University of Iowa
- NFL draft: 1972: 9th round, 219th overall pick

Career history
- Chicago Bears (1972); Chicago Bears (1973)*; Washington Redskins (1974)*; Montreal Alouettes (1974)
- * Offseason or practice squad member only

Career NFL statistics
- Games played: 10
- Stats at Pro Football Reference

Lawrence Horton (born April 29, 1949) is an American former professional football player who was a defensive end for the Chicago Bears of the National Football League (NFL) and the Montreal Alouettes of the Canadian Football League (CFL).

Horton transferred to the University of Iowa as a junior after previously attending Centerville Junior College, where he also played basketball. After playing college football for the Iowa Hawkeyes, Horton was selected by the Bears in the 9th round of the 1972 NFL draft with the 219th overall pick. He signed with the Bears in April. During the 1972 preseason with the Bears, Horton struggled with his confidence, especially after having played for a losing team in Iowa. Horton stated that "It's real tough playing for a losing team like Iowa. You start doubting your own abilities soon enough." After two strong preseason games he had a poor game against the New England Patriots. He said of that game "I played one half or so, and I just plain forgot what the coaches told me and I went back to my old, bad habits. Horton was assigned to the Bears' taxi squad to begin the 1972 season. Horton was activated from the taxi squad in October when the Bears starting defensive end Willie Holman was injured and played in 10 games the rest of the season. Horton ended the season with 2 quarterback sacks and was credited with a kickoff return for 3 yards in the Bears' final game against the Oakland Raiders.

In 1973, Horton was deactivated before the season began and was waived in October. In 1974 he signed with the Washington Redskins but was waived during the preseason. He signed with the Alouettes in October and played 2 games for them before being released.
