= Luther Palmer =

American football player and coach (born 1949)

Biographical details
- Born: July 20, 1949 (age 77); Carlisle, Pennsylvania, U.S.

Playing career
- 1968–1971: Virginia Union
- 1974: Chicago Fire
- 1974: Florida Blazers
- 1975: San Antonio Wings
- Positions: Tight end, kicker

Coaching career (HC unless noted)
- 2013: Virginia–Lynchburg

Luther Palmer (born July 20, 1949) is an American former football player and coach. He served as the head football coach at Virginia University of Lynchburg in 2013. He was drafted by the Los Angeles Rams in 17th round of the 1972 NFL draft.
