= 1972 NFL draft =

1972 NFL player selection

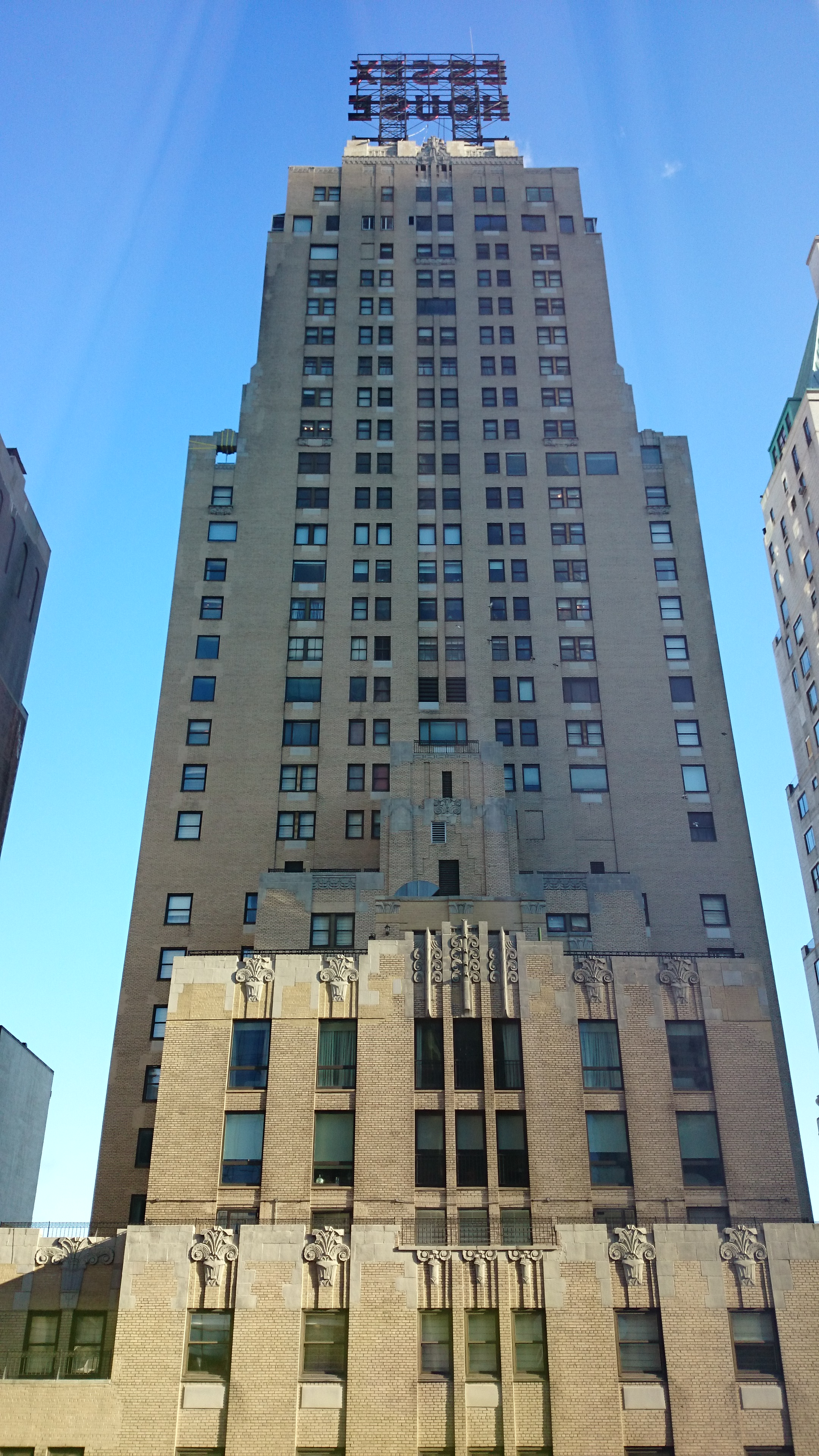
- Essex House (location of the draft), photographed in 2015

General information
- Date: February 1–2, 1972
- Location: Essex House in New York City, New York

Overview
- 442 total selections in 17 rounds
- League: NFL
- First selection: Walt Patulski, DE; Buffalo Bills
- Mr. Irrelevant: Alphonso Cain, DT; Dallas Cowboys
- Most selections (23): New Orleans Saints
- Fewest selections (10): Washington Redskins
- Hall of Famers: 2: FB Franco Harris; WR Cliff Branch

The 1972 NFL draft was the 37th annual meeting of National Football League (NFL) franchises to select newly eligible football players. The draft was held on February 1 and 2 at the Essex House in New York City, New York.

With the first overall pick of the draft, the Buffalo Bills selected defensive end Walt Patulski. Patulski would become viewed as a draft bust, after the Bills released him in 1976 — coincidentally replacing Patuski with second overall choice Sherman White of California. NFL historians have frequently described 1972 as one of the league's worst draft classes ever, especially regarding the failure of the majority of 1st round draftees, which has become viewed worse than other notably weak drafts like 2002 and 2009. Only seven of 26 first rounders made the Pro Bowl in their career, and the whole 1972 draft produced just two Hall of Fame members, one of whom, wide receiver Cliff Branch, was inducted posthumously. This was the fewest of any draft class since the 1959 draft, which had only Dick LeBeau enshrined in Canton.

== Player selections ==
*	= compensatory selection
†	= Pro Bowler (Note: Players are identified as a Pro Bowler if they were selected for the Pro Bowl at any time in their career.)
‡	= Hall of Famer (Note: Players are identified as a Hall of Famer if they have been inducted into the Pro Football Hall of Fame.)

Positions key
Offense	Defense	Special teams
QB — Quarterback; RB — Running back; FB — Fullback; WR — Wide receiver; TE — Tight end; OL — Offensive lineman; T — Tackle; G — Guard; C — Center	DL — Defensive lineman; DT — Defensive tackle (Note: Includes nose tackle (NT)); DE — Defensive end; EDGE — Edge rusher; LB — Linebacker (Note: Includes middle linebacker (MLB/MIKE), weakside linebacker (WILL), strongside linebacker (SAM), off-ball linebacker, and outside linebacker (OLB)); DB — Defensive back; CB — Cornerback; S — Safety (Note: Includes free safety (FS) and strong safety (SS))	K — Kicker (Note: Also known as a placekicker (PK)); P — Punter; LS — Long snapper; RS — Return specialist (Note: Includes kickoff and punt returners)

=== Round 1–9 ===
Rnd.	Pick	Team	Player	Pos.	College	Notes
1	1	Buffalo Bills	Walt Patulski	DE	Notre Dame	
1	2	Cincinnati Bengals	Sherman White	DE	California	
1	3	Chicago Bears	Lionel Antoine	T	Southern Illinois	from N. Y. Giants
1	4	St. Louis Cardinals	Bobby Moore ^{†}	WR	Oregon	
1	5	Denver Broncos	Riley Odoms ^{†}	TE	Houston	
1	6	Houston Oilers	Greg Sampson	DE	Stanford	
1	7	Green Bay Packers	Willie Buchanon ^{†}	CB	San Diego State	
1	8	New Orleans Saints	Royce Smith	G	Georgia	
1	9	New York Jets	Jerome Barkum ^{†}	WR	Jackson State	
1	10	Minnesota Vikings	Jeff Siemon ^{†}	LB	Stanford	from New England
1	11	Green Bay Packers	Jerry Tagge	QB	Nebraska	from San Diego
1	12	Chicago Bears	Craig Clemons	S	Iowa	
1	13	Pittsburgh Steelers	Franco Harris^{‡}^{†}	FB	Penn State	
1	14	Philadelphia Eagles	John Reaves	QB	Florida	
1	15	Atlanta Falcons	Clarence Ellis	S	Notre Dame	
1	16	Detroit Lions	Herb Orvis	DE	Colorado	
1	17	New York Giants	Eldridge Small	CB	Texas A&I	from Los Angeles via New England
1	18	Cleveland Browns	Thom Darden ^{†}	S	Michigan	
1	19	San Francisco 49ers	Terry Beasley	WR	Auburn	
1	20	New York Jets	Mike Taylor	LB	Michigan	from Washington
1	21	Oakland Raiders	Mike Siani	WR	Villanova	
1	22	Baltimore Colts	Tom Drougas	T	Oregon	
1	23	Kansas City Chiefs	Jeff Kinney	RB	Nebraska	
1	24	New York Giants	Larry Jacobson	DE	Nebraska	from Minnesota
1	25	Miami Dolphins	Mike Kadish	DT	Notre Dame	
1	26	Dallas Cowboys	Bill Thomas	RB	Boston College	
2	27	Buffalo Bills	Reggie McKenzie	G	Michigan	
2	28	San Francisco 49ers	Ralph McGill	S	Tulsa	from N. Y. Giants
2	29	Cincinnati Bengals	Tommy Casanova ^{†}	S	LSU	
2	30	Los Angeles Rams	Jim Bertelsen ^{†}	RB	Texas	from Denver via San Diego
2	31	New Orleans Saints	Willie Hall	LB	USC	from Houston
2	32	St. Louis Cardinals	Mark Arneson	LB	Arizona	
2	33	Oakland Raiders	Kelvin Korver	T	Northwestern (IA)	from New Orleans
2	34	Green Bay Packers	Chester Marcol ^{†}	K	Hillsdale	
2	35	Dallas Cowboys	Robert Newhouse	RB	Houston	from New England
2	36	San Diego Chargers	Pete Lazetich	DE	Stanford	
2	37	Philadelphia Eagles	Dan Yochum	T	Syracuse	from Chicago
2	38	Pittsburgh Steelers	Gordon Gravelle	T	BYU	
2	39	Dallas Cowboys	John Babinecz	LB	Villanova	from N. Y. Jets via Oakland through New Orleans
2	40	Atlanta Falcons	Pat Sullivan	QB	Auburn	from Philadelphia via Detroit Heisman Trophy winner
2	41	Atlanta Falcons	Steve Okoniewski	T	Montana	from Detroit
2	42	Atlanta Falcons	Rosie Manning	DT	Northeastern State	
2	43	Oakland Raiders	John Vella	T	USC	
2	44	San Francisco 49ers	Jean Barrett	T	Tulsa	
2	45	Cleveland Browns	Clifford Brooks	CB	Tennessee State	
2	46	Baltimore Colts	Jack Mildren	S	Oklahoma	from Oakland
2	47	Baltimore Colts	Glenn Doughty	WR	Michigan	from Washington
2	48	Baltimore Colts	Lydell Mitchell ^{†}	RB	Penn State	
2	49	New England Patriots	Tom Reynolds	WR	San Diego State	from Kansas City
2	50	Minnesota Vikings	Ed Marinaro	RB	Cornell	
2	51	Cleveland Browns	Lester Sims	DE	Alabama State	from Miami
2	52	Dallas Cowboys	Charles McKee	WR	Arizona	
3	53	Buffalo Bills	Fred Swendson	DE	Notre Dame	
3	54	Cincinnati Bengals	Jim LeClair ^{†}	DE	North Dakota	
3	55	New York Giants	John Mendenhall	DT	Grambling	
3	56	Houston Oilers	Lewis Jolley	RB	North Carolina	
3	57	St. Louis Cardinals	Tom Beckman	DE	Michigan	
3	58	Denver Broncos	Bill Phillips	LB	Arkansas State	
3	59	Minnesota Vikings	Bart Buetow	T	Minnesota	from Green Bay
3	60	New Orleans Saints	Bob Kuziel	C	Pittsburgh	
3	61	San Diego Chargers	Bill McClard	K	Arkansas	
3	62	Chicago Bears	Johnny Musso	RB	Alabama	
3	63	Pittsburgh Steelers	John McMakin	TE	Clemson	
3	64	Dallas Cowboys	Mike Keller	LB	Michigan	from New England
3	65	Detroit Lions	Ken Sanders	DE	Howard Payne	from Philadelphia
3	66	New York Jets	Gary Hammond	WR	SMU	
3	67	Atlanta Falcons	Les Goodman	RB	Yankton	
3	68	Philadelphia Eagles	Tom Luken	G	Purdue	from Detroit
3	69	New York Giants	Tom Mozisek	RB	Houston	from Los Angeles
3	70	Los Angeles Rams	Lawrence McCutcheon ^{†}	RB	Colorado State	
3	71	San Francisco 49ers	Allen Dunbar	WR	Southern	
3	72	Oakland Raiders	Mel Lunsford	DT	Central State	
3	73	New England Patriots	Jim White	DE	Colorado State	from Washington via Los Angeles
3	74	New Orleans Saints	Tom Myers ^{†}	S	Syracuse	from Baltimore via Oakland
3	75	Houston Oilers	Solomon Freelon	G	Grambling	from Kansas City
3	76	Philadelphia Eagles	Bobby Majors	DB	Tennessee	from Minnesota
3	77	Miami Dolphins	Gary Kosins	RB	Dayton	
3	78	Dallas Cowboys	Marv Bateman	P	Utah	
4	79	Buffalo Bills	Randy Jackson	RB	Wichita State	
4	80	Pittsburgh Steelers	Lorenzo Brinkley	DB	Missouri	from N. Y. Giants
4	81	Cincinnati Bengals	Bernard Jackson	CB	Washington State	
4	82	St. Louis Cardinals	Jeff Lyman	LB	BYU	
4	83	Dallas Cowboys	Tim Kearney	LB	Northern Michigan	from Denver via New Orleans
4	84	St. Louis Cardinals	Martin Imhof	DT	San Diego State	from Houston
4	85	New Orleans Saints	Mike Crangle	DE	UT Martin	
4	86	Green Bay Packers	Eric Patton	LB	Notre Dame	
4	87	Los Angeles Rams	John Saunders	SS	Toledo	from Chicago
4	88	Pittsburgh Steelers	Ed Bradley	LB	Wake Forest	
4	89	New York Jets	Ed Galigher	DE	UCLA	
4	90	Dallas Cowboys	Robert West	WR	San Diego State	from New England
4	91	Miami Dolphins	Larry Ball	DE	Louisville	from San Diego
4	92	Philadelphia Eagles	Po James	RB	New Mexico State	
4	93	Dallas Cowboys	Chuck Zapiec	LB	Penn State	from Detroit
4	94	Atlanta Falcons	Andrew Howard	DT	Grambling	
4	95	Los Angeles Rams	Eddie Phillips	QB	Texas	
4	96	San Francisco 49ers	Windlan Hall	CB	Arizona State	
4	97	Kansas City Chiefs	Andy Hamilton	WR	LSU	from Cleveland
4	98	Oakland Raiders	Cliff Branch^{‡}^{†}	WR	Colorado	
4	99	New Orleans Saints	Joe Federspiel	LB	Kentucky	from Washington via Los Angeles through Philadelphia
4	100	Oakland Raiders	Dave Dalby ^{†}	C	UCLA	from Baltimore
4	101	New Orleans Saints	Mike Coleman	DE	Knoxville	from Kansas City
4	102	Denver Broncos	Tom Graham	LB	Oregon	from Minnesota
4	103	Miami Dolphins	Al Benton	T	Ohio	
4	104	Baltimore Colts	Eric Allen	WR	Michigan State	from Dallas via New Orleans through Detroit
5	105	Buffalo Bills	Leon Garror	CB	Alcorn A&M	
5	106	Cincinnati Bengals	Tom DeLeone ^{†}	C	Ohio State	
5	107	New York Giants	Tom Gatewood	WR	Notre Dame	
5	108	Buffalo Bills	Bob Penchion	G	Alcorn A&M	from Denver
5	109	Atlanta Falcons	William Taylor	RB	Michigan	from Houston via Denver through Buffalo
5	110	St. Louis Cardinals	Conrad Dobler ^{†}	G	Wyoming	
5	111	New Orleans Saints	Bill Butler	RB	Kansas State	from Green Bay
5	112	New Orleans Saints	Carl Johnson	T	Nebraska	
5	113	Pittsburgh Steelers	Steve Furness	DE	Rhode Island	
5	114	New York Jets	Dickie Harris	DB	South Carolina	
5	115	Baltimore Colts	Don Croft	DT	UTEP	from New England
5	116	San Diego Chargers	Jim Bishop	TE	Tennessee Tech	
5	117	Chicago Bears	Bob Parsons	TE	Penn State	
5	118	Denver Broncos	Jim Krieg	WR	Washington	from Philadelphia
5	119	Atlanta Falcons	Ralph Cindrich	LB	Pittsburgh	
5	120	Los Angeles Rams	Bob Childs	G	Kansas	from Detroit
5	121	New York Giants	Larry Edwards	LB	Texas A&I	from Los Angeles via Washington
5	122	Cleveland Browns	George Hunt	K	Tennessee	
5	123	San Francisco 49ers	Mike Greene	LB	Georgia	
5	124	New England Patriots	Ron Bolton	CB	Norfolk State	
5	125	Los Angeles Rams	Bob Christiansen	TE	UCLA	from Washington
5	126	New Orleans Saints	Bob Davies	DB	South Carolina	from Baltimore
5	127	Kansas City Chiefs	Milt Davis	DE	Texas–Arlington	
5	128	Cleveland Browns	Greg Kucera	RB	Northern Colorado	from Minnesota via Los Angeles
5	129	Miami Dolphins	Charlie Babb	S	Memphis State	
5	130	San Diego Chargers	Harry Gooden	DE	Alcorn A&M	from Dallas
6	131	Oakland Raiders	Dan Medlin	DT	NC State	from Buffalo
6	132	New York Giants	John Hill	C	Lehigh	
6	133	Chicago Bears	Bob Pifferini	LB	UCLA	from Cincinnati
6	134	Houston Oilers	Joe Bullard	DB	Tulane	
6	135	St. Louis Cardinals	Don Heater	RB	Montana Tech	
6	136	Houston Oilers	Elmer Allen	LB	Ole Miss	from Denver
6	137	New Orleans Saints	Wayne Dorton	G	Arkansas State	
6	138	Green Bay Packers	Nathaniel Ross	DB	Bethune–Cookman	
6	139	New York Jets	Joey Jackson	DE	New Mexico State	
6	140	Atlanta Falcons	Mike Perfetti	DB	Minnesota	from New England via Minnesota
6	141	San Diego Chargers	Bruce Ward	G	San Diego State	
6	142	Green Bay Packers	Dave Pureifory	LB	Eastern Michigan	from Chicago
6	143	Pittsburgh Steelers	Dennis Meyer	S	Arkansas State	
6	144	Philadelphia Eagles	Vern Winfield	G	Minnesota	
6	145	Detroit Lions	Charlie Potts	DB	Purdue	
6	146	Atlanta Falcons	Fred Riley	WR	Idaho	
6	147	Green Bay Packers	Bob Hudson	RB	Northeastern State	from Los Angeles
6	148	San Francisco 49ers	Jackie Walker	DB	Tennessee	
6	149	Cleveland Browns	Leonard Forey	G	Texas A&M	
6	150	New Orleans Saints	Curt Watson	RB	Tennessee	from Oakland
6	151	Los Angeles Rams	Edward Hebert	DT	Texas Southern	from Washington
6	152	Baltimore Colts	Bruce Laird ^{†}	S	American International	
6	153	Kansas City Chiefs	John Kahler	DE	Long Beach State	
6	154	Minnesota Vikings	Anthony Martin	LB	Louisville	
6	155	Miami Dolphins	Ray Nettles	LB	Tennessee	
6	156	Dallas Cowboys	Charles Bolden	DB	Iowa	
7	157	Buffalo Bills	Ralph Stepaniak	DB	Notre Dame	
7	158	Cincinnati Bengals	Steve Conley	RB	Kansas	
7	159	Pittsburgh Steelers	Joe Colquitt	DE	Kansas State	from N. Y. Giants
7	160	St. Louis Cardinals	Council Rudolph	DE	Kentucky State	
7	161	Miami Dolphins	Bill Adams	G	Holy Cross	from Denver
7	162	Houston Oilers	Eric Hutchinson	DB	Northwestern	
7	163	Green Bay Packers	Bill Bushong	DT	Kentucky	
7	164	New Orleans Saints	Ernie Jackson	CB	Duke	
7	165	New England Patriots	Clark Hoss	TE	Oregon State	from Oakland
7	166	New England Patriots	John Tarver	RB	Colorado	from San Diego
7	167	Chicago Bears	Jim Fassel	QB	Long Beach State	
7	168	Pittsburgh Steelers	Robert Kelly	DB	Jackson State	
7	169	Baltimore Colts	John Sykes	RB	Morgan State	from N. Y. Jets via Washington
7	170	Philadelphia Eagles	Will Foster	LB	Eastern Michigan	
7	171	Atlanta Falcons	Lance Moon	RB	Wisconsin	
7	172	Detroit Lions	Charles Stoudmire	WR	Portland State	from Los Angeles
7	173	Oakland Raiders	Ray Jamieson	RB	Memphis State	
7	174	Cleveland Browns	Don Wesley	T	Maryland State	
7	175	San Francisco 49ers	Edgar Hardy	G	Jackson State	
7	176	Oakland Raiders	Alonzo "Skip" Thomas	CB	USC	
7	177	New York Giants	Mike Zikas	DT	Notre Dame	from Washington
7	178	Oakland Raiders	Dennis Pete	DB	San Francisco State	from Baltimore
7	179	Kansas City Chiefs	Dean Carlson	QB	Iowa State	
7	180	Miami Dolphins	Calvin Harrell	RB	Arkansas State	
7	181	Minnesota Vikings	Bill Slater	DE	Western Michigan	
7	182	Chicago Bears	Jim Osborne	DT	Southern	from Dallas
8	183	Buffalo Bills	Paul Gibson	WR	UTEP	
8	184	New York Giants	Tom Mabry	T	Arkansas	
8	185	Cincinnati Bengals	Dan Kratzer	WR	Missouri Valley	
8	186	Denver Broncos	Ron Estay	DT	LSU	
8	187	Houston Oilers	Guy Roberts	LB	Maryland	
8	188	St. Louis Cardinals	Bob Wicks	WR	Utah State	
8	189	New Orleans Saints	Ron Vinson	WR	Abilene Christian	
8	190	Green Bay Packers	Leland Glass	WR	Oregon	
8	191	Baltimore Colts	Al Qualls	LB	Oklahoma	from San Diego
8	192	Chicago Bears	Ralph Wirtz	WR	North Dakota State	
8	193	Pittsburgh Steelers	Stahle Vincent	RB	Rice	
8	194	New York Jets	Marion Lattimore	G	Kansas State	
8	195	New England Patriots	Steve Beyrle	G	Kansas State	
8	196	Philadelphia Eagles	Larry Ratcliff	RB	Eastern Michigan	
8	197	Detroit Lions	Henry Stuckey	DB	Missouri	
8	198	Atlanta Falcons	Henry Brandon	RB	Southern	
8	199	Los Angeles Rams	Tom Graham	WR	Baldwin Wallace	
8	200	San Francisco 49ers	Tom Wittum ^{†}	P	Northern Illinois	
8	201	Cleveland Browns	Hugh McKinnis	RB	Arizona State	
8	202	Oakland Raiders	Jackie Brown	RB	Stanford	
8	203	Washington Redskins	Moses Denson	RB	Maryland State	
8	204	Baltimore Colts	Van Brownson	QB	Nebraska	
8	205	Kansas City Chiefs	Scott Mahoney	G	Colorado	
8	206	Minnesota Vikings	Calvin Demery	WR	Arizona State	
8	207	Miami Dolphins	Craig Curry	QB	Minnesota	
8	208	Dallas Cowboys	Ralph Coleman	LB	North Carolina A&T	
9	209	Buffalo Bills	Steve Vogel	LB	Boise State	
9	210	Cincinnati Bengals	Stan Walters ^{†}	T	Syracuse	
9	211	New York Giants	Ed Richardson	RB	Southern	
9	212	Houston Oilers	Willie Postler	T	Montana	
9	213	St. Louis Cardinals	Gene Macken	C	South Dakota	
9	214	Denver Broncos	Floyd Priester	DB	Boston University	
9	215	Baltimore Colts	Gary Hambell	DT	Dayton	from Green Bay
9	216	New Orleans Saints	Kent Branstetter	DT	Houston	
9	217	Pittsburgh Steelers	Don Kelley	DB	Clemson	
9	218	New York Jets	Jeff Ford	DB	Georgia Tech	
9	219	Chicago Bears	Larry Horton	DE	Iowa	
9	220	New England Patriots	Mike Kelson	T	Arkansas	
9	221	San Diego Chargers	Fran Schmitz	DT	St. Norbert	
9	222	Philadelphia Eagles	Pat Gibbs	CB	Lamar	
9	223	Atlanta Falcons	Ray Easterling	S	Richmond	
9	224	Detroit Lions	Bill McClintock	DB	Drake	
9	225	Los Angeles Rams	Harry Howard	S	Ohio State	
9	226	Cleveland Browns	Larry McKee	G	Arizona	
9	227	San Francisco 49ers	Jerry Brown	DB	Northwestern	
9	228	Oakland Raiders	Dave Bigler	RB	Morningside	
9	229	Washington Redskins	Steve Boekholder	DE	Drake	
9	230	Cleveland Browns	Billy Lefear	WR	Henderson State	from Baltimore
9	231	Kansas City Chiefs	Dave Taylor	DT	Weber State	
9	232	Minnesota Vikings	Charlie Goodrum	G	Florida A&M	
9	233	Miami Dolphins	Greg Johnson	DB	Wisconsin	
9	234	Dallas Cowboys	Roy Bell	RB	Oklahoma	

=== Round 10 ===
Pick #	NFL team	Player	Position	College
235	Buffalo Bills	Maurice Tyler	Defensive back	Morgan State
236	New York Giants	John Odom	Defensive back	Texas Tech
237	Cincinnati Bengals	Brian Foster	Defensive back	Colorado
238	St. Louis Cardinals	Eric Washington	Defensive back	Texas-El Paso
239	Denver Broncos	Richard Wilkins	Defensive end	Maryland State
240	Houston Oilers	Rhett Dawson	Wide receiver	Florida State
241	New Orleans Saints	Andy Kupp	Guard	Idaho
242	Green Bay Packers	Keith Wortman	Guard	Nebraska
243	Pittsburgh Steelers	Bob Brown	Defensive tackle	Tampa
244	New York Jets	Harley Turner	Defensive back	Tennessee-Chattanooga
245	New England Patriots	Mel Caraway	Defensive back	N.E. Oklahoma
246	San Diego Chargers	Lon Kolstad	Linebacker	Whitewater (Wis)
247	Chicago Bears	Jack Turnbull	Center	Oregon State
248	Philadelphia Eagles	John Bunting	Linebacker	North Carolina
249	Detroit Lions	Jim Teal	Linebacker	Purdue
250	St. Louis Cardinals	Mike Franks	Quarterback	Eastern New Mexico
251	Los Angeles Rams	Jim Massey	Defensive back	Linfield
252	San Francisco 49ers	Steve Williams	Defensive tackle	Western Carolina
253	Cleveland Browns	Hershal Mosier	Defensive tackle	N.W. Oklahoma
254	Oakland Raiders	Phillip Price	Defensive back	Idaho State
255	Washington Redskins	Mike Oldham	Wide receiver	Michigan
256	Baltimore Colts	Dave Shilling	Running back	Oregon State
257	Kansas City Chiefs	Rich Ruppert	Tackle	Hawaii
258	Minnesota Vikings	Willie Aldridge	Running back	South Carolina State
259	Houston Oilers	Jimmy Butler	Tight end	Tulsa
260	Dallas Cowboys	Richard Amman	Defensive tackle	Florida State

=== Round 11 ===
Pick #	NFL team	Player	Position	College
261	Cincinnati Bengals	Kent Pederson	Tight end	California-Santa Barbara
262	New York Giants	John Robertson	Defensive back	Kansas State
263	Denver Broncos	Larry Brunson	Wide receiver	Colorado
264	Houston Oilers	Ron Evans	Tackle	Baylor
265	St. Louis Cardinals	Ron Jones	Linebacker	Arkansas
266	Green Bay Packers	David Bailey	Wide receiver	Alabama
267	New Orleans Saints	Paul Dongieux	Linebacker	Mississippi
268	New York Jets	Robert Stevenson	Linebacker	Tennessee State
269	New England Patriots	Rodney Cason	Tackle	Angelo State
270	San Diego Chargers	John Turner	Tight end	Long Beach State
271	Buffalo Bills	Bill Light	Linebacker	Minnesota
272	Chicago Bears	Ed Wimberly	Defensive back	Jackson State
273	Pittsburgh Steelers	Joe Gilliam	Quarterback	Tennessee State
274	Philadelphia Eagles	Dennis Sweeney	Defensive end	Western Michigan
275	Atlanta Falcons	Jack Phillips	Wide receiver	Grambling
276	Detroit Lions	Bob Waldron	Defensive tackle	Tulane
277	Oakland Raiders	Joe Carroll	Linebacker	Pittsburgh
278	Cleveland Browns	Mel Long	Linebacker	Toledo
279	San Francisco 49ers	Tom Laputka	Defensive end	Southern Illinois
280	Los Angeles Rams	Albert Schmidt	Running back	Pittsburg State (KS)
281	Washington Redskins	Jeff Welch	Defensive back	Arkansas Tech
282	Baltimore Colts	Fred DeBernardi	Defensive end	Texas-El Paso
283	Kansas City Chiefs	Elbert Walker	Tackle	Wisconsin
284	Minnesota Vikings	Willie McKelton	Defensive back	Southern
285	Miami Dolphins	Ed Jenkins	Wide receiver	Holy Cross
286	Dallas Cowboys	Lonnie Leonard	Defensive end	North Carolina A&T

=== Round 12 ===
Pick #	NFL team	Player	Position	College
287	Buffalo Bills	Jeff Baker	Wide receiver	U.S. International
288	New York Giants	Jay Anderson	Defensive tackle	Mayville
289	Cincinnati Bengals	Frederick Wegis	Defensive back	Cal Poly-San Luis Obispo
290	Houston Oilers	Willie Rodgers	Running back	Kentucky State
291	St. Louis Cardinals	Tommy Gay	Defensive tackle	Arkansas AM&N
292	Denver Broncos	Randy McDougall	Defensive back	Weber State
293	New Orleans Saints	Steve Lockhart	Tight end	Arkansas State
294	Green Bay Packers	Mike Rich	Running back	Florida
295	San Diego Chargers	Sam Key	Linebacker	Elon
296	New England Patriots	Steve Booras	Defensive end	Mesa Jr. College
297	Chicago Bears	Doug Neill	Running back	Texas A&M
298	Pittsburgh Steelers	Ron Curl	Tackle	Michigan State
299	New York Jets	John Bjorklund	Running back	Princeton
300	Philadelphia Eagles	Don Zimmerman	Wide receiver	N.E. Louisiana
301	Detroit Lions	Paul Bradley	Wide receiver	Southern Methodist
302	Atlanta Falcons	Larry Mialik	Tight end	Wisconsin
303	Los Angeles Rams	David Hoot	Defensive back	Texas A&M
304	San Francisco 49ers	Steve Setzler	Defensive end	St. John's
305	Cleveland Browns	Bernard Chapman	Defensive back	Texas-El Paso
306	Oakland Raiders	Kent Gaydos	Tight end	Florida State
307	Washington Redskins	Don Bunce	Quarterback	Stanford
308	Baltimore Colts	Gary Theiler	Tight end	Tennessee
309	Kansas City Chiefs	Mike Williams	Defensive tackle	Oregon
310	Minnesota Vikings	Bob Banaugh	Defensive back	Montana State
311	Miami Dolphins	Ashley Bell	Tight end	Purdue
312	Dallas Cowboys	Jimmy Harris	Wide receiver	Ohio State

=== Round 13 ===
Pick #	NFL team	Player	Position	College
313	Buffalo Bills	Ed Moss	Running back	Southeast Missouri State
314	Cincinnati Bengals	James Hamilton	Quarterback	Arkansas State
315	New York Giants	Chuck Heard	Defensive end	Georgia
316	St. Louis Cardinals	Tom Campana	Defensive back	Ohio State
317	Denver Broncos	Bob Warner	Running back	Bloomsburg (PA)
318	Houston Oilers	Willie Roberts	Defensive back	Houston
319	Green Bay Packers	Jesse Lakes	Running back	Central Michigan
320	New Orleans Saints	Cephus Weatherspoon	Wide receiver	Fort Lewis
321	San Diego Chargers	Andy Selfridge	Linebacker	Virginia
322	Chicago Bears	Jay Rood	Tackle	Southern (S.D.)
323	Pittsburgh Steelers	Ernie Mesmer	Tackle	Villanova
324	New York Jets	Steve Sullivan	Tackle	North Texas State
325	New England Patriots	Sam Elmore	Defensive back	Eastern Michigan
326	Philadelphia Eagles	Preston Carpenter	Defensive end	Mississippi
327	Atlanta Falcons	Henry Sovio	Tight end	Hawaii
328	Detroit Lions	John Kirschner	Tight end	Memphis State
329	Los Angeles Rams	Jaime Nunez	Kicker	Weber State
330	Cleveland Browns	Brian Sipe	Quarterback	San Diego State
331	San Francisco 49ers	Leon Pettigrew	Tackle	San Fernando Valley
332	Washington Redskins	Frank Grant	Wide receiver	Southern Colorado
333	Oakland Raiders	Ted Covington	Wide receiver	San Fernando Valley
334	Baltimore Colts	Herb Washington	Wide receiver	Michigan State
335	Kansas City Chiefs	Tyler Hellams	Defensive back	South Carolina
336	Minnesota Vikings	Franklin Roberts	Running back	Alcorn A&M
337	Miami Dolphins	Archie Robinson	Defensive back	Hillsdale
338	Dallas Cowboys	Jean Fugett	Tight end	Amherst

=== Round 14 ===
Pick #	NFL team	Player	Position	College
339	New York Giants	James Evans	Linebacker	South Carolina State
340	Buffalo Bills	Karl Salb	Defensive tackle	Kansas
341	Cincinnati Bengals	Steve Porter	Wide receiver	Indiana
342	Denver Broncos	Jerome Kundich	Guard	Texas-El Paso
343	Houston Oilers	Gary Crockett	Center	Lamar
344	St. Louis Cardinals	Pat McTeer	Kicker	New Mexico State
345	New Orleans Saints	Steve Barrios	Wide receiver	Tulane
346	Green Bay Packers	Larry Hefner	Linebacker	Clemson
347	Chicago Bears	Bob Brown	Wide receiver	Rice
348	Pittsburgh Steelers	Tom Durrance	Running back	Florida
349	New York Jets	Louis Age	Guard	Southwestern Louisiana
350	New England Patriots	Ed Rideout	Wide receiver	Boston College
351	San Diego Chargers	John Van Reenen	Defensive end	Washington State
352	Philadelphia Eagles	Bill Overmyer	Linebacker	Ashland
353	Detroit Lions	Eric Kelley	Tackle	Whitworth
354	Atlanta Falcons	Tom Chandler	Linebacker	Minnesota
355	Los Angeles Rams	Larry Brooks	Defensive end	Virginia State
356	San Francisco 49ers	Eric Guthrie	Quarterback	Boise State
357	Cleveland Browns	Ed Stewart	Guard	East Central Oklahoma
358	Oakland Raiders	Dennis Cambal	Running back	William & Mary
359	Baltimore Colts	John Morris	Center	Missouri Valley
360	Kansas City Chiefs	David Chaney	Linebacker	San Jose State
361	Minnesota Vikings	Marv Owens	Running back	San Diego State
362	Miami Dolphins	Willie Jones	Linebacker	Tampa
363	Dallas Cowboys	Alan Thompson	Running back	Wisconsin
364	Washington Redskins	Mike O'Quinn	Guard	McNeese State

=== Round 15 ===
Pick #	NFL team	Player	Position	College
365	Oakland Raiders	Charles Hester	Running back	Central State (OH)
366	Cincinnati Bengals	Hosea Minnieweather	Defensive tackle	Jackson State
367	New York Giants	Ken Kavanaugh Jr.	Tight end	LSU
368	Pittsburgh Steelers	John Hulecki	Guard	Massachusetts
369	St. Louis Cardinals	Mark Herman	Tight end	Yankton
370	Denver Broncos	Harold Parmenter	Defensive tackle	Massachusetts
371	Green Bay Packers	Rick Thone	Wide receiver	Arkansas Tech
372	New Orleans Saints	Rusty Lachaussee	Quarterback	Tulane
373	Pittsburgh Steelers	Charles Harrington	Guard	Wichita State
374	New York Jets	Phil Sullivan	Defensive back	Georgia
375	New England Patriots	Joel Klime	Tight end	Pittsburgh
376	San Diego Chargers	Charles Neugent	Defensive back	Tuskegee
377	Chicago Bears	Roger Lawson	Running back	Western Michigan
378	Philadelphia Eagles	Tom Sullivan	Running back	Miami (FL)
379	Atlanta Falcons	Oscar Jenkins	Defensive back	Virginia Union
380	Detroit Lions	Steve Roach	Linebacker	Kansas
381	Los Angeles Rams	Kenny Page	Linebacker	Kansas
382	Cleveland Browns	Jewel McCullar	Linebacker	Chico State
383	San Francisco 49ers	Bob Maddox	Defensive end	Frostburg State (MD)
384	Oakland Raiders	Dave Snesrud	Linebacker	Hamline
385	Washington Redskins	Carl Taibi	Defensive end	Colorado
386	Baltimore Colts	Robin Parkhouse	Linebacker	Alabama
387	Kansas City Chiefs	Larry Marshall	Running back	Maryland
388	Minnesota Vikings	Mike Sivert	Guard	East Tennessee State
389	Miami Dolphins	Bill Davis	Defensive tackle	William & Mary
390	Dallas Cowboys	Carlos Alvarez	Wide receiver	Florida

=== Round 16 ===
Pick #	NFL team	Player	Position	College
391	Buffalo Bills	Brian Linstrom	Quarterback	Arizona
392	New York Giants	Neovia Greyer	Defensive back	Wisconsin
393	Cincinnati Bengals	John Wiegman	Wide receiver	Cal Poly-Pomona
394	St. Louis Cardinals	Henry Alford	Defensive end	Pittsburgh
395	Denver Broncos	Tom Bougus	Running back	Boston College
396	Houston Oilers	Guy Murdock	Center	Michigan
397	New Orleans Saints	Joe Balthrop	Guard	Tennessee
398	Green Bay Packers	Charles Burrell	Defensive tackle	Arkansas AM&N
399	New York Jets	Gary Kipfmiller	Center	Nebraska-Omaha
400	New England Patriots	Eric Dahl	Defensive back	San Jose State
401	San Diego Chargers	James Shaw	Defensive back	Tulsa
402	Chicago Bears	Bill McKinney	Linebacker	West Texas State
403	Pittsburgh Steelers	Nate Hawkins	Wide receiver	Nevada-Las Vegas
404	Philadelphia Eagles	Steve Bielenberg	Linebacker	Oregon State
405	Detroit Lions	Leon Jenkins	Defensive back	West Virginia
406	Atlanta Falcons	Larry Butler	Linebacker	Stanford
407	Los Angeles Rams	Jim Kirby	Wide receiver	Long Beach State
408	San Francisco 49ers	Ron Davis	Guard	Virginia State
409	Cleveland Browns	Richard Wakefield	Wide receiver	Ohio State
410	Oakland Raiders	Willie Wright	Tight end	North Carolina A&T
411	Washington Redskins	Steve Higginbottom	Defensive back	Alabama
412	Baltimore Colts	Gary Wichard	Quarterback	C.W. Post
413	Kansas City Chiefs	Bob Johnson	Defensive end	Hanover (Ind)
414	Minnesota Vikings	Neil Graff	Quarterback	Wisconsin
415	Miami Dolphins	Al Hannah	Wide receiver	Wisconsin
416	Dallas Cowboys	Gordon Longmire	Quarterback	Utah

=== Round 17 ===
Pick #	NFL team	Player	Position	College
417	Buffalo Bills	John Shelly	Defensive back	Oklahoma
418	Cincinnati Bengals	David Green	Punter	Ohio
419	New York Giants	John Seyferth	Running back	Michigan
420	Denver Broncos	Lou Harris	Running back	USC
421	Houston Oilers	Kelly Cochrane	Quarterback	Miami (FL)
422	St. Louis Cardinals	Kent Carter	Linebacker	USC
423	San Diego Chargers	Oscar Dragon	Running back	Arizona State
424	New England Patriots	Dick Graham	Wide receiver	Oklahoma State
425	New England Patriots	Junior Ah You	Linebacker	Arizona State
426	San Diego Chargers	Bob Tackett	Tackle	Texas-El Paso
427	Chicago Bears	LaVerne Dickinson	Defensive back	Southern
428	Pittsburgh Steelers	Ron Linehan	Linebacker	Idaho
429	New York Jets	Ken Gamble	Kicker	Fayetteville
430	Philadelphia Eagles	Tom Nash	Tackle	Georgia
431	Atlanta Falcons	Bill Holland	Running back	USC
432	Detroit Lions	Mike Tyler	Defensive back	Rice
433	Los Angeles Rams	Luther Palmer	Tight end	Virginia Union
434	Cleveland Browns	William Portz	Running back	Sterling (KS)
435	San Francisco 49ers	Ted Alexander	Running back	Langston
436	Los Angeles Rams	John McKean	Center	Oregon
437	Washington Redskins	Kevin Clemente	Linebacker	Boston College
438	Baltimore Colts	Stan White	Linebacker	Ohio State
439	Kansas City Chiefs	Ted Washington	Linebacker	Mississippi Valley
440	Minnesota Vikings	Dick Schmalz	Wide receiver	Auburn
441	Miami Dolphins	Vern Brown	Defensive back	Western Michigan
442 (Note: This last selection is commonly referred to as Mr. Irrelevant.)	Dallas Cowboys	Alphonso Cain	Defensive tackle	Bethune-Cookman

== Hall of Famers ==
- Franco Harris, running back from Penn State, taken 1st round 13th overall by Pittsburgh Steelers

Inducted: Professional Football Hall of Fame class of 1990.

- Cliff Branch, wide receiver from Colorado, taken 4th round 98th overall by Oakland Raiders

Inducted: Professional Football Hall of Fame class of 2022 (posthumous).

== Notable undrafted players ==
^{†}	= Pro Bowler

Original NFL team	Player	Pos.	College	Notes
Atlanta Falcons	John James ^{†}	P	Florida	
Atlanta Falcons	Ted Fritsch	C	St. Norbert	
Atlanta Falcons	Jack LeVeck	LB	Ohio	
Baltimore Colts	Nelson Munsey	CB	Wyoming	
Chicago Bears	Steve Kinney	T	Utah State	
Cleveland Browns	Fest Cotton	DT	Dayton	
Dallas Cowboys	Benny Barnes	CB	Stanford	
Dallas Cowboys	Brian Goodman	G	UCLA	
Denver Broncos	Mike Ernst	QB	Cal State Fullerton	
Denver Broncos	Mike Simone	LB	Stanford	
Green Bay Packers	Bob Kroll	CB	Northern Michigan	
Houston Oilers	Ed Fisher	G	Arizona State	
Houston Oilers	Al Johnson	DB/RB	Cincinnati	
Houston Oilers	Rich Lewis	LB	Portland State	
Kansas City Chiefs	Keith Best	LB	Kansas State	
Los Angeles Rams	Bill Drake	S	Oregon	
New England Patriots	Dick Blanchard	LB	Tulsa	
New England Patriots	Mike Walker	K		
New York Giants	Chuck Crist	S	Penn State	
New York Jets	Lou Piccone	WR	West Liberty	
Pittsburgh Steelers	Barry Pearson	WR	Northwestern	
Washington Redskins	Duane Carrell	P	Florida State	
Washington Redskins	Herb Mul-Key ^{†}	RB	Alabama State	
