= Bill Overmyer =

American football player (born 1949)

No. 56
- Position: Linebacker

Personal information
- Born: June 16, 1949 (age 77); Fremont, Ohio, U.S.
- Listed height: 6 ft 3 in (1.91 m)
- Listed weight: 220 lb (100 kg)

Career information
- College: Ashland
- NFL draft: 1972: 14th round, 352nd overall pick

Career history
- Philadelphia Eagles (1972); Philadelphia Eagles (1973)*; Houston Texans (1974)*; Washington Redskins (1975)*
- * Offseason or practice squad member only

Career NFL statistics
- Kickoff returns: 1
- Kickoff return yards: 0
- Stats at Pro Football Reference

William Lee Overmyer (born June 16, 1949) is an American former professional football player who was a linebacker in the National Football League (NFL). He played college football for the Ashland Eagles.

== College career ==
Overmyer played college football as a defensive end at Ashland College, where he was named the school's "best defensive lineman" in 1969, 1970 and 1971. In 1971 he also earned an honorable mention in the Associated Press All-America team and he was a second-team of the Kodak College All-America Football Team. He was inducted into Ashland's hall of fame in 2004.

== Professional career ==
Overmyer was selected by the Philadelphia Eagles in the 14th round of the 1972 NFL draft with the 352nd overall pick. In the preseason he competed with three others – fellow rookie Will Foster and veterans Ike Kelley and Bill Cody – to replace Tim Rossovich, who was holding out and was eventually traded, to be the Eagles' middle linebacker after Steve Zabel was injured in training camp. Overmyer said of the experience:

I have never played linebacker before so making the adjustments is hard. I am doing okay against the pass with out zone coverage but I'm having trouble picking up the keys...When those experienced linemen come at you a rookie is in trouble. Also, I don't get as much work as I require since we have so many linebackers here. One thing, the coaches keep talking to me so I know I have a chance...I understand that they are teaching me on defense but experience is the major difference; however, the other rookies who have played linebacker are having trouble adjusting too. I am just as well prepared as those rookies from major universities. One thing I am working hard for is making the specialty team, which can help keep me up here...One of the scary things here is that you wake up in the morning and your roommate is not there anymore. My roomie (a rookie from South Carolina University) was cut; he was gone when I woke up. I'm holding my breath...I want to get past those cuts.

Because he always had to prove himself, his Eagles' teammates nicknamed him "underdog." Overmyer was waived late in the preseason but was later signed to join the Eagles' taxi squad.

He was activated for the first time in November for the Eagles' 9th game of the season against the Houston Oilers. He then played in every game for the Eagles for the rest of the season, for a total of 6 games. In the last game of the season, which proved to be his last game in the National Football League, he was credited with a kickoff return for no yards against the St. Louis Cardinals. He was cut by the Eagles during the 1973 preseason.

In 1974 he signed with the Houston Texans of the World Football League but was not on their regular season roster. In 1975 he signed as a free agent with the Washington Redskins but was cut during preseason.
