= Jack Rizzo =

American football player (born 1949)

No. 34
- Position: Running back

Personal information
- Born: June 15, 1949 (age 77); Boston, Massachusetts, U.S.
- Listed height: 5 ft 10 in (1.78 m)
- Listed weight: 195 lb (88 kg)

Career information
- High school: Weston, Kimball Union Academy
- College: Lehigh
- NFL draft: 1972: undrafted

Career history
- Ottawa Roughriders (1972); New York Giants (1973); Houston Texans / Shreveport Steamer (1974)
- Stats at Pro Football Reference

John Ralph Rizzo (born June 15, 1949) is an American former professional football player who was a running back for three seasons. After playing college football for the Lehigh Mountain Hawks, he played with the Ottawa Roughriders of the Canadian Football League (CFL) in 1972, with the New York Giants of the National Football League (NFL) in 1973, and with the Houston Texans / Shreveport Steamer of the World Football League (WFL) in 1974.
