= Kelvin Korver =

American football player (born 1949)

No. 71
- Position: Defensive tackle

Personal information
- Born: February 21, 1949 (age 77); Dallas, Texas, U.S.
- Listed height: 6 ft 6 in (1.98 m)
- Listed weight: 267 lb (121 kg)

Career information
- High school: Irving (Irving, Texas)
- College: Texas A&M Northwestern (IA)
- NFL draft: 1972: 2nd round, 33rd overall pick

Career history
- Oakland Raiders (1972–1976)

Awards and highlights
- Super Bowl champion (XI); First-team Little All-American (1971); Third-team Little All-American (1970)

Career NFL statistics
- Sacks: 2
- Fumble recoveries: 1
- Interceptions: 1
- Stats at Pro Football Reference

Kelvin Mitchell Korver (born February 21, 1949) is an American former professional football player who was a defensive tackle for three seasons with the Oakland Raiders of the National Football League (NFL). He was selected by the Raiders in the second round of the 1972 NFL draft. He played college football for the Texas A&M Aggies and Northwestern Red Raiders.

== Early life and college ==
Kelvin Mitchell Korver was born on February 21, 1949, in Dallas, Texas. He attended Irving High School in Irving, Texas.

Korver was on the freshman football team at Texas A&M University in 1967. He was later a member of the Northwestern Red Raiders of Northwestern College from 1969 to 1971. He received Associated Press (AP) third-team Little All-America honors in 1970 and AP first-team Little All-America recognition in 1971.

== Professional career ==
Korver was selected by the Oakland Raiders in the second round, with the 33rd overall pick, of the 1972 NFL draft. He spent the 1972 season on the taxi squad. He played in all 14 games for the Raiders in 1973, recording one sack, one interception, and one fumble recovery. He also appeared in two playoff games that season. Korver played in nine games in 1974 and made one sack. He appeared in one game, a start, for the Raiders during the 1975 season. He was placed on injured reserve on September 8, 1976, and spent the entire season there. On January 9, 1977, the Raiders won Super Bowl XI against the Minnesota Vikings. Korver was released in 1977.

== Personal life ==
Korver's brother Clayton Korver played college football at Southern Methodist University and Northwestern College, spent the 1975 offseason with the Philadelphia Eagles, and played for The Hawaiians of the World Football League in 1975.
