= Jack LeVeck =

American football player (born 1950)

No. 52, 56
- Position: Linebacker

Personal information
- Born: February 3, 1950 (age 76); Columbus, Ohio, U.S.
- Listed height: 6 ft 0 in (1.83 m)
- Listed weight: 225 lb (102 kg)

Career information
- High school: Pataskala (OH) Watkins Memorial
- College: Ohio
- NFL draft: 1972: undrafted

Career history
- Atlanta Falcons (1972)*; St. Louis Cardinals (1973–1974); Cleveland Browns (1975)
- * Offseason or practice squad member only
- Stats at Pro Football Reference

Jack LeVeck (born February 3, 1950) is an American former professional football player who was a linebacker in the National Football League (NFL). He played college football for the Ohio Bobcats. He played in the NFL for the St. Louis Cardinals from 1973 to 1974 and for the Cleveland Browns in 1975.
