= 1971 Little All-America college football team =

1971 college football All-America teams

The 1971 Little All-America college football team is composed of college football players from small colleges and universities who were selected by the Associated Press (AP) as the best players at each position. For 1971, the AP selected three teams, each team having separate offensive and defensive platoons.

First-team quarterback Gary Wichard of C. W. Post was a prolific passer.

Terry Metcalf of Long Beach State was a first-team running back in both 1970 and 1971.

Running back Gardy Kahoe was the main offensive weapon for the AP/UPI small college champion 1971 Delaware Fightin' Blue Hens football team. He rushed for 1,216 yards and 23 touchdowns in 10 regular season games. He added another 112 yards in the Boardwalk Bowl.

== First team ==
| Position | Player | Team |
|---|---|---|
Offense
| QB | Gary Wichard | C. W. Post |
| RB | Gardy Kahoe | Delaware |
| RB | Bruce Laird | American International |
| RB | Terry Metcalf | Long Beach State |
| E | Jerome Barkum | Jackson State |
| E | Eldridge Small | Texas A&I |
| T | Lionel Antoine | Southern Illinois |
| T | Ron Mikolajczyk | Tampa |
| G | Wayne Dorton | Arkansas State |
| G | Solomon Freelon | Grambling |
| C | John Hill | Lehigh |
Defense
| DE | Kelvin Korver | Northwestern (IA) |
| DE | John Mendenhall | Grambling |
| DT | Larry Brooks | Virginia State |
| DT | Steve Williams | Western Carolina |
| MG | Sammy Gellerstedt | Tampa |
| LB | Harry Gooden | Alcorn A&M |
| LB | Jim LeClair | North Dakota |
| LB | Jim Youngblood | Tennessee Tech |
| DB | Cliff Brooks | Tennessee State |
| DB | Levi Johnson | Texas A&I |
| DB | Dennis Meyer | Arkansas State |

== Second team ==
| Position | Player | Team |
|---|---|---|
Offense
| QB | Joe Gilliam | Tennessee State |
| RB | Dave Bigler | Morningside |
| RB | Ole Gunderson | St. Olaf |
| RB | Calvin Harrell | Arkansas State |
| E | Jeff Baker | USIU |
| E | Rick Thone | Arkansas Tech |
| T | Rod Cason | Angelo State |
| T | Bruce Nichols | Jacksonville State |
| G | Gene Macken | South Dakota |
| G | John Nuttal | Northern Arizona |
| C | Charlie Powell | McNeese State |
Defense
| DE | Grail Kister | Northern Colorado |
| DE | Ken Sanders | Howard Payne |
| DT | Clinton Brown | Hayward State |
| DT | Dave Pureifory | Eastern Michigan |
| MG | Roosevelt Manning | Northeastern Oklahoma State |
| LB | Whitey Baun | Wittenberg |
| LB | Tim Kearney | Northern Michigan |
| LB | Greg Wright | Troy State |
| DB | Mike Holmes | Texas Southern |
| DB | Dan Martinsen | North Dakota |
| DB | Tom Rezzuti | Northeastern |

== Third team ==
| Position | Player | Team |
|---|---|---|
Offense
| QB | Ken Lantrip | Louisiana Tech |
| RB | Don Aleksiweicz | Hobart |
| RB | Don Heater | Montana Tech |
| RB | Charles Jessamy | Kansas Wesleyan |
| E | Tom Hoffman | Idaho State |
| E | Kalle Konston | RPI |
| T | Ron Haines | Rochester |
| T | Steve Okoniewski | Montana |
| G | Fred Blackhurst | Westminster (PA) |
| G | Jim Osborne | Southern |
| C | Ron Sani | Santa Clara |
Defense
| DE | Dave Snesrud | Hamline |
| DE | Jim Stone | Hawaii |
| DT | Doug Cowan | Puget Sound |
| DT | Theodore Washington | Mississippi Valley State |
| MG | Chris Richardson | Louisiana Tech |
| LB | Pete Contaldi | Montclair State |
| LB | Sam Cvijanovich | Cal Lutheran |
| LB | Mike Leidy | Hampden–Sydney |
| DB | Ron Collier | Central Missouri |
| DB | Saylor Fox | Newberry |
| DB | Bob Kroll | Northern Michigan |

== See also ==
- 1971 College Football All-America Team
