= Irving High School =

School in Irving, Texas, United States

Location
- 900 O'Connor Road; Irving, Dallas County, Texas 75061; United States; 32.8233°N 96.9502°W

Information
- Type: Co-Educational, Public, Secondary
- Established: 1909
- School district: Irving Independent School District
- Principal: Todd Allen
- Teaching staff: 155.37 (FTE)
- Grades: 9–12
- Enrollment: 2,535 (2023-2024)
- Student to teacher ratio: 16.32
- Campus: Urban
- Colors: Gold and black
- Mascot: Tiger
- Website: ihs.irvingisd.net

Irving High School is a public high school in Irving, Texas. It was the first high school established in the Irving Independent School District.

Irving High School includes, like all the other Irving ISD high schools, wireless internet in the classrooms, Chromebooks in every classroom, and a Distance Learning Lab.

In 2009, the school was rated "academically acceptable" by the Texas Education Agency.

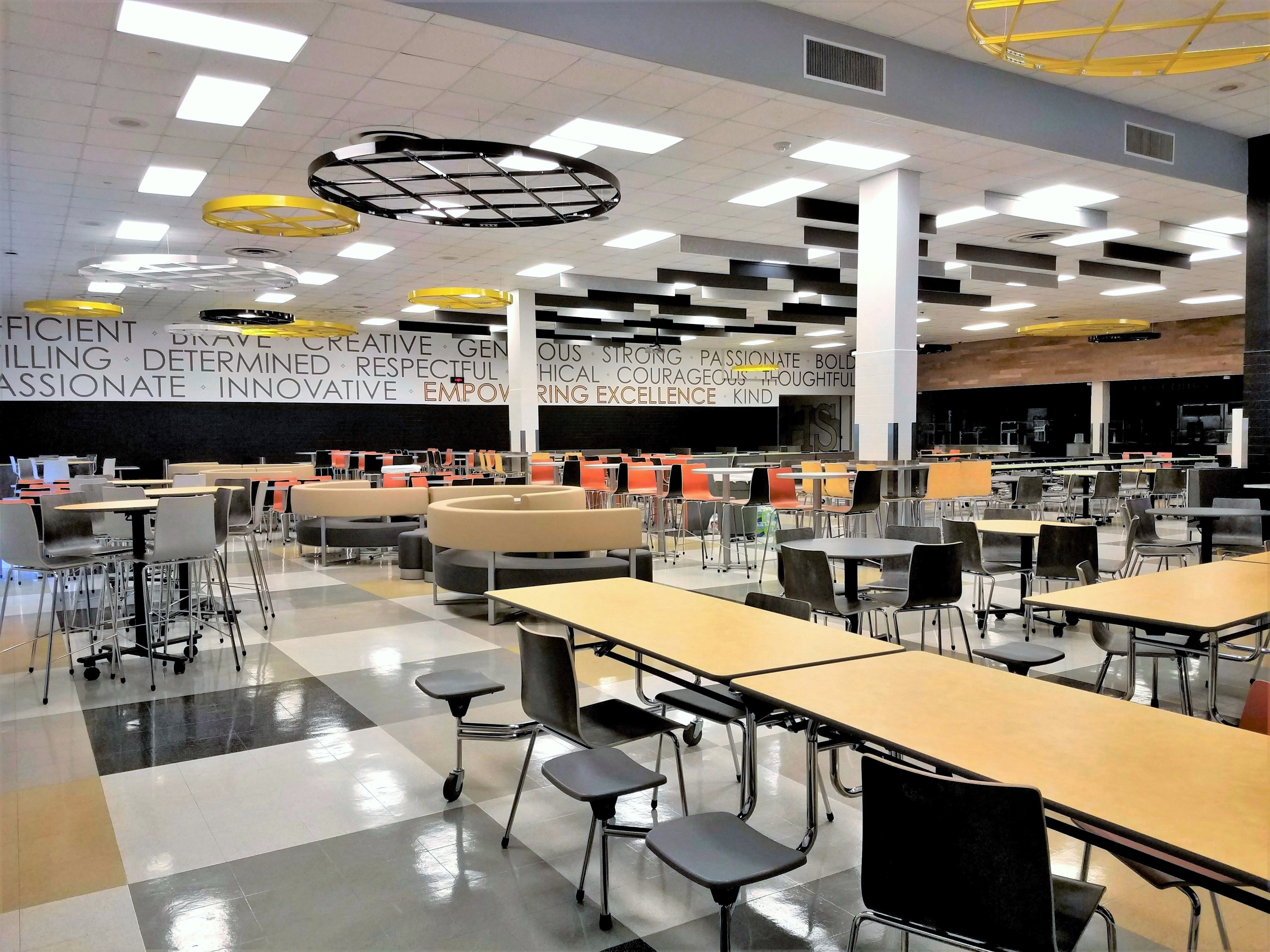
Cafeteria, after renovations

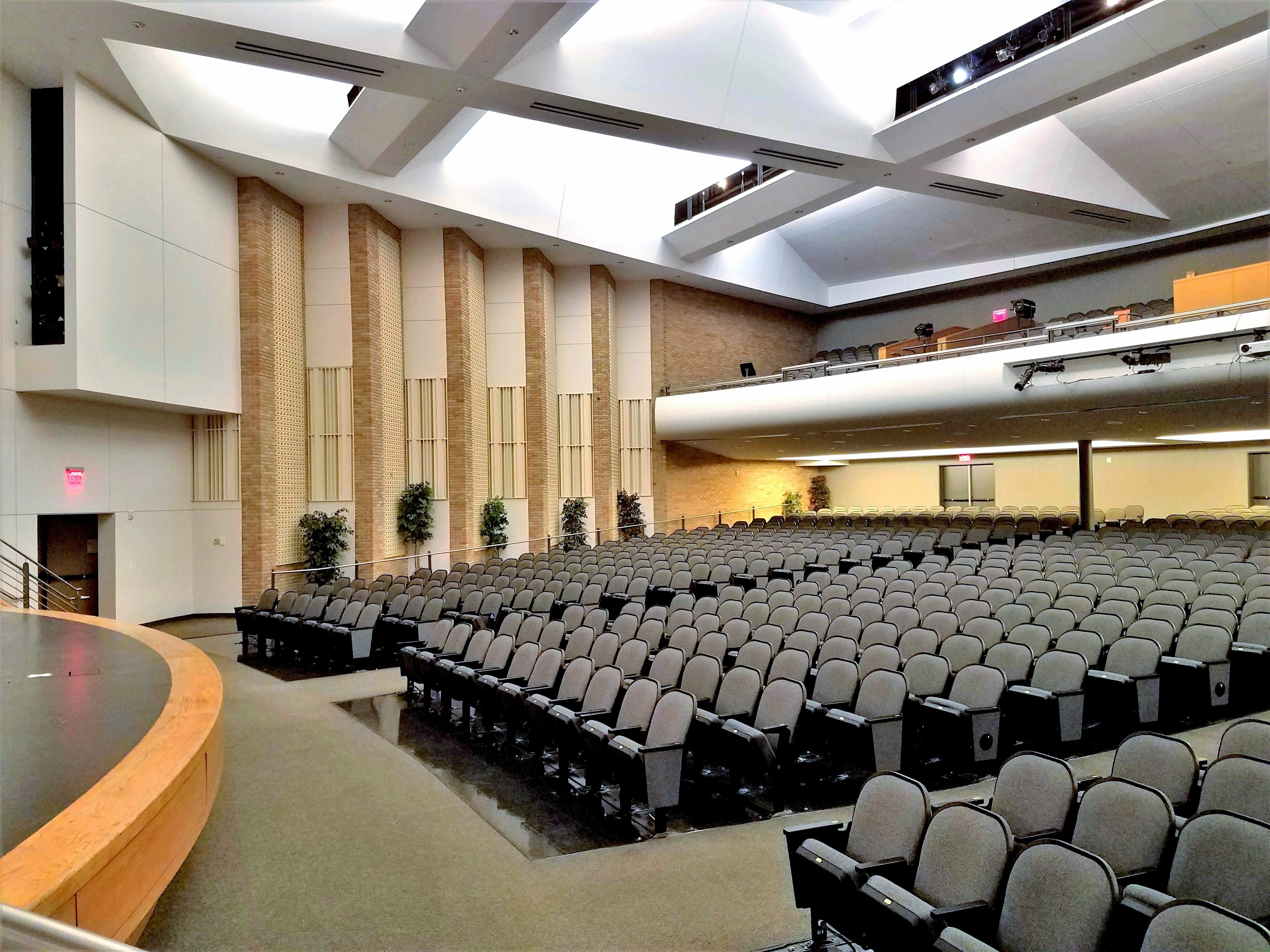
Auditorium

== History ==
Irving High School was initially located on Jefferson and 2nd Street. Nicknamed "Old Red," the red brick building hosted the school until 1929 when a new facility was built. A new high school was built in 1936, and was replaced again in 1949. The current campus was completed in 1961.

For many years, Irving High was the only high school for white students in Irving ISD until MacArthur High School opened in 1963. In 1967, the school was desegregated following the closure of the K-12 J.O. Davis School, which served Black students from kindergarten to twelfth grade.

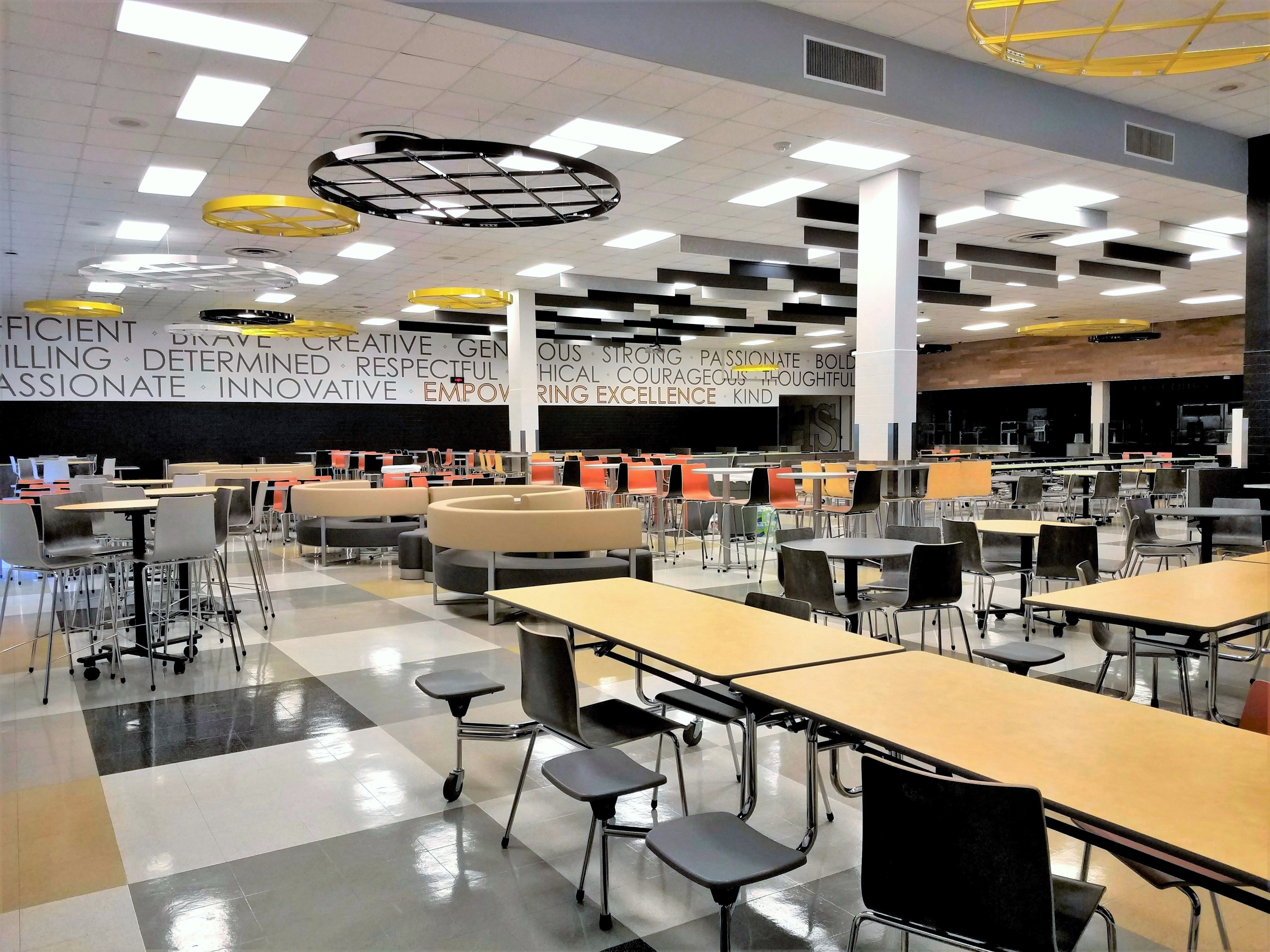
Cafeteria, after renovations

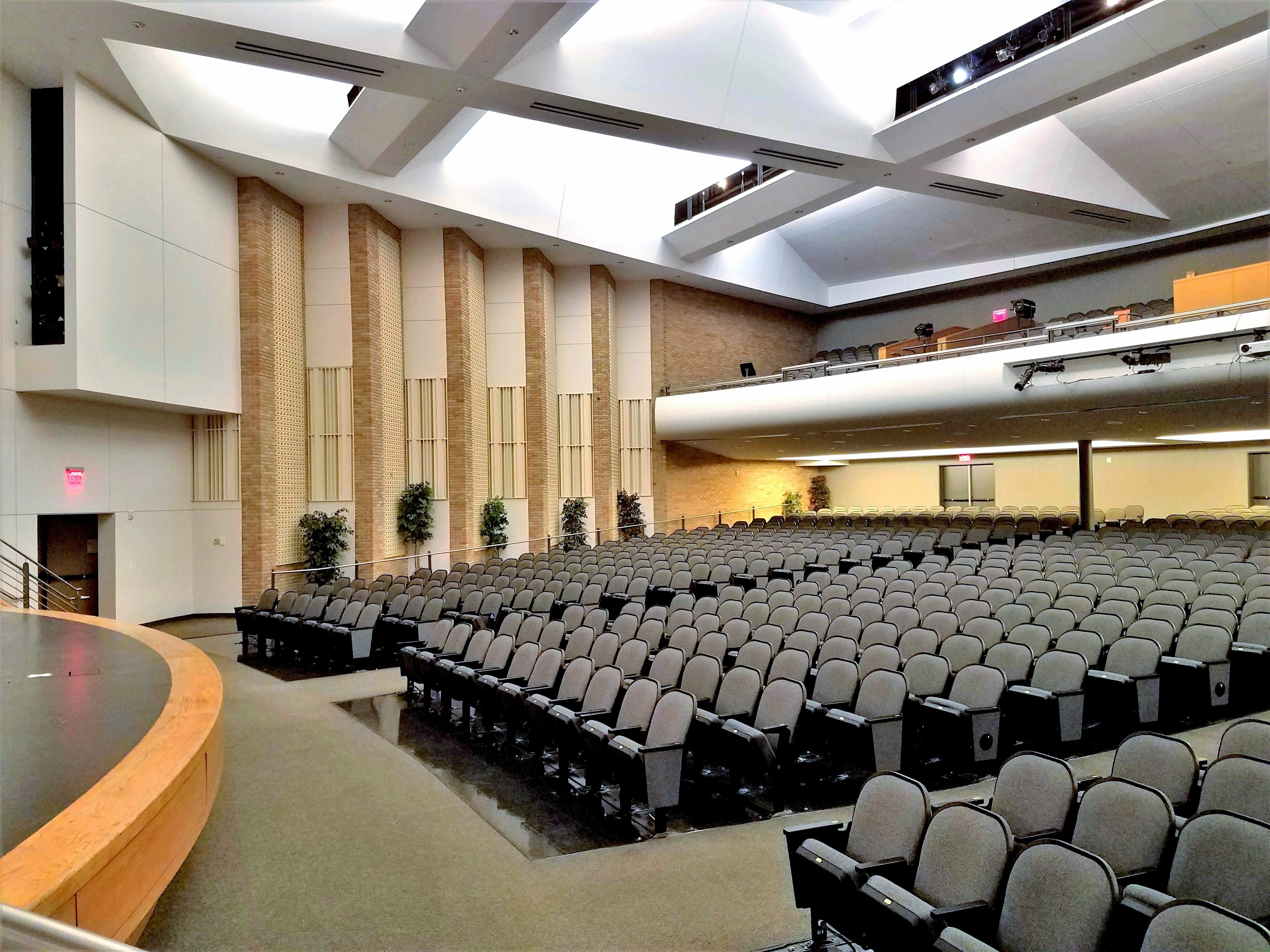
Auditorium

== Notable alumni ==
- Frank Beard, drummer for ZZ Top
- Blake Beavan, professional baseball player
- Jim Beaver, actor
- Demarcus Faggins, former professional football player
- Marquez Haynes, former professional basketball player
- Kelvin Korver, American football player
- David Lowery, film director
- John Moore, Pulitzer Prize-winning photojournalist
- Trevor Story, Major League Baseball player
- Tyson Thompson, former professional football player
- Daryl Washington, former professional football player
