= Willie McKelton =

American gridiron football player (born 1949)

Profile
- Position: Defensive back

Personal information
- Born: July 3, 1949 (age 77); Auburn, New York, U.S.
- Listed height: 5 ft 11 in (1.80 m)
- Listed weight: 185 lb (84 kg)

Career information
- High school: East Lake (Tarpon Springs, Florida); Pahokee (FL)
- College: Southern
- NFL draft: 1972: 11th round, 284th overall pick

Career history
- 1973: Hartford Knights (ACFL)
- 1973: Ottawa Rough Riders (CFL)
- 1974: Portland Storm (WFL)

Awards and highlights
- Grey Cup champion (1973)

Willie James McKelton (born July 3, 1949) is an American former professional football player who played for the Ottawa Rough Riders and Portland Storm. He played college football at Southern University.
