= Bill Drake (American football) =

American football player (born 1950)

No. 45
- Position: Safety

Personal information
- Born: May 22, 1950; Portland, Oregon, U.S.
- Died: September 28, 2018 (aged 68); Portland, Oregon, U.S.
- Listed height: 6 ft 1 in (1.85 m)
- Listed weight: 195 lb (88 kg)

Career information
- High school: Jefferson
- College: Oregon
- NFL draft: 1972: undrafted

Career history
- Los Angeles Rams (1972)*; Dallas Cowboys (1973)*; Los Angeles Rams (1973–1974); Philadelphia Eagles (1976)*
- * Offseason or practice squad member only
- Stats at Pro Football Reference

William Donald Drake (May 22, 1950-September 28, 2018) is an American former professional football player who was a defensive back for the Los Angeles Rams of National Football League (NFL). He played college football for the University of Oregon.
