= Walt Love (American football) =

American football player (born 1950)

No. 46
- Position: Wide receiver

Personal information
- Born: June 4, 1950 (age 76); Cleveland, Ohio, U.S.
- Listed height: 5 ft 9 in (1.75 m)
- Listed weight: 180 lb (82 kg)

Career information
- High school: John F. Kennedy
- College: Westminster (Utah)
- NFL draft: 1973: 10th round, 250th overall pick

Career history
- New York Giants (1973)
- Stats at Pro Football Reference

Walter James Love (born June 4, 1950) is an American former professional football player who was a wide receiver for the New York Giants of National Football League (NFL). He played college football for the Westminster University (Utah).
