= Mark Ellison (American football) =

American football player (born 1948)

No. 65
- Position: Guard

Personal information
- Born: April 15, 1948 (age 78); Pittsburgh, Pennsylvania, U.S.
- Listed height: 6 ft 2 in (1.88 m)
- Listed weight: 250 lb (113 kg)

Career information
- High school: Westinghouse
- College: Dayton
- NFL draft: 1971: 11th round, 278th overall pick

Career history
- Toronto Argonauts (1971)*; New York Giants (1972–1973); Philadelphia Eagles (1975)*
- * Offseason or practice squad member only

Career NFL statistics
- Games played: 28
- Games started: 5
- Stats at Pro Football Reference

Marshall Mark Ellison (born April 15, 1948) is an American former professional football player who was a guard for the New York Giants of National Football League (NFL). He played college football for the University of Dayton.
