= Steve Williams (defensive lineman, born 1951) =

American football player (born 1951)

No. 74
- Position: Defensive tackle

Personal information
- Born: January 12, 1951 (age 75); Columbia, South Carolina, U.S.
- Listed height: 6 ft 6 in (1.98 m)
- Listed weight: 260 lb (118 kg)

Career information
- High school: Eau Claire (Columbia)
- College: Western Carolina
- NFL draft: 1972: 10th round, 252nd overall pick

Career history
- San Francisco 49ers (1972)*; Edmonton Eskimos (1973)*; Houston Oilers (1974)*; Baltimore Colts (1974); Winnipeg Blue Bombers (1976)
- * Offseason or practice squad member only

Awards and highlights
- First-team Little All-American (1971)
- Stats at Pro Football Reference

Steven Ford Williams (born January 12, 1951) is an American former professional football defensive tackle who played for the Baltimore Colts of the National Football League (NFL). He played college football for the Western Carolina Catamounts and was selected by the San Francisco 49ers in the tenth round of the 1972 NFL draft.

== Early life ==
Steven Ford Williams was born on January 12, 1951, in Columbia, South Carolina. He attended Eau Claire High School in Columbia. He tried out for the football team in 10th grade but was cut. He made the team as a senior in 1967, and helped them win the class 3A state title.

== College career ==
Williams enrolled at Western Carolina University to play college football for the Western Carolina Catamounts. He had to shave his head in 1968, typical of freshman hazing of the time. He started every game at defensive tackle for the Catamounts from 1968 to 1971, earning all-district honors twice. There was a Steve A. Williams who was also a football letterman at Western Carolina from 1968 to 1970. As a senior in 1971, Steve F. Williams was named a first-team Little All-American by the Associated Press at defensive tackle. He finished his college career with over 300 tackles, and graduated with a social science degree. Williams was inducted into Western Carolina University's Athletics Hall of Fame in 1996.

== Professional career ==
Williams was selected by the San Francisco 49ers in the tenth round, with the 252nd overall pick, of the 1972 NFL draft. He was released on September 7, before the final game of the 1972 preseason.

Williams signed with the Edmonton Eskimos of the Canadian Football League (CFL) for the 1973 CFL season. He competed for a defensive end spot on the team. However, he was released on July 13, 1973, after the second preseason game.

Williams signed with the Houston Oilers in February 1974. He was with the team during the 1974 NFL players strike. He was later waived by the Oilers, and then claimed off waivers by the Baltimore Colts on July 24, 1974. Williams played in 12 games, starting three, at defensive tackle for the Colts during the 1974 season and recorded one fumble recovery. He also played on special teams. He was released on September 15, 1975, before the start of the regular season.

Williams was signed by the CFL's Winnipeg Blue Bombers in 1976. He started the first two games of the 1976 season at defensive tackle but suffered a season-ending knee injury in the second game.
