= Ron Lumpkin =

American football player (born 1951)

No. 47
- Position: Defensive back

Personal information
- Born: June 22, 1951 (age 75); Los Angeles, California, U.S.
- Listed height: 6 ft 2 in (1.88 m)
- Listed weight: 205 lb (93 kg)

Career information
- High school: Mount Carmel
- College: Arizona State
- NFL draft: 1973: 12th round, 303rd overall pick

Career history
- New York Giants (1973); Houston Oilers (1975)*; Saskatchewan Roughriders (1977)*
- * Offseason or practice squad member only
- Stats at Pro Football Reference

Ronald Lumpkin (born June 22, 1951) is an American former professional football player who was a defensive back for the New York Giants of National Football League (NFL). He played college football for the Arizona State University.
