= Eldridge Small =

American football player (1949–2015)

No. 18
- Position: Cornerback

Personal information
- Born: August 2, 1949; Houston, Texas, U.S.
- Died: May 11, 2015 (aged 65)
- Listed height: 6 ft 1 in (1.85 m)
- Listed weight: 190 lb (86 kg)

Career information
- High school: Phillis Wheatley (Houston, TX)
- College: Texas A&I
- NFL draft: 1972: 1st round, 17th overall pick

Career history
- New York Giants (1972–1974)

Awards and highlights
- First-team Little All-American (1971)

Career NFL statistics
- Interceptions: 1
- Return yards: 353
- Stats at Pro Football Reference

Eldridge Small (August 2, 1949 – May 11, 2015) was an American professional football player who was a cornerback for the New York Giants of the National Football League (NFL) from 1972 to 1974.

Small was born in Houston, Texas, and attended Wheatley High School before playing college football for the Texas A&I Javelinas from 1968 to 1971 as a wide receiver and defensive back. As a receiver, he had 20 touchdowns in his college career, made 167 receptions, and had 2,547 receiving yards. Small was the Javelinas' all-time receptions leader until 2013, when Robert Armstrong surpassed his total. In 1971, Small was chosen as a member of the Little All-America team. Texas A&I won two National Association of Intercollegiate Athletics national championships during his time with the team. The university's Javelina Hall of Fame inducted Small in 1991.

In the 1972 NFL draft, the Giants selected Small in the first round with the 17th overall pick, which they had obtained from the New England Patriots in a trade for defensive end Fred Dryer. He played in 34 games for the Giants over three seasons, intercepting one pass, in 1974, and amassing 353 kick return yards. In 1975, the Giants traded Small to the Cleveland Browns, but he was released before the start of the regular season. Following his NFL career, he began coaching in the Houston Independent School District, working for Sterling High School as an offensive coordinator. On May 11, 2015, when he was 65 years old, Small died.
