= Ray Walsh =

American football executive (1916–1998)

Personal information
- Born: March 18, 1916; New York City, New York, U.S.
- Died: August 6, 1998 (aged 82); White Plains, New York, U.S.

Career information
- High school: Fordham Prep (The Bronx, New York)
- College: Fordham

Career history
- New York Giants (1947–1973) General manager; New York Giants (1974–1993) Vice president / secretary

Awards and highlights
- NFL champion (1956); 2× Super Bowl champion (XXI, XXV)
- Executive profile at Pro Football Reference

Raymond J. Walsh (March 18, 1916 – August 6, 1998) was an American football executive. He served as the general manager for the New York Giants of the National Football League (NFL) from 1947 to 1973 and remained with the team through 1993.

== Early life ==
Walsh was born on March 18, 1916, in New York City. He attended Fordham Preparatory School in The Bronx, New York, before attending Fordham University. At Fordham, he played tennis and was the school's No. 1 singles player for three years. He went undefeated in doubles play as a junior and senior and was known as a "fierce competitor"; according to the Fordham website, "Walsh liked to run around using his backhand and possessed a swooping forehand described by contemporaries as 'murderous'".

Walsh graduated from Fordham magna cum laude in 1937. He later attended the Fordham University School of Law where he graduated in 1942, and remained active in tennis affairs, including helping found the school tennis club where he was a member in the 1950s and 1960s. He was a multi-time tennis champion of White Plains, New York, in the 1950s. He was inducted into the Fordham Rams Hall of Fame in 1990.

== Executive career ==
After having worked for a time in the insurance field, in 1947 Walsh joined the New York Giants which was owned by Wellington Mara, a friend of his at Fordham. He officially held the position of general manager, but acted more as a scout and advisor to Mara, who performed most of the work the position usually encompassed. Walsh still served as the manager of much of the team's business affairs, and also helped run the team's radio and television operations. He ultimately served in the position for 27 seasons – from 1947 to 1973 – and helped the team compile a regular season record of 180–158–12, which included seven playoff appearances, six conference title appearances and a league championship in 1956.

Walsh was removed as general manager and replaced by Andy Robustelli in 1974, but remained with the team as vice president and secretary. He negotiated the team's move to Giants Stadium in East Rutherford, New Jersey, in 1976. He stayed with the Giants through 1993 before announcing his retirement; he helped them win the Super Bowls for the 1986 and 1990 seasons.

== Personal life and death ==
Walsh was married and had four children. He died on August 6, 1998, at the age of 82, in White Plains.
