= John Hill (American football) =

American football player (1950–2018)

No. 52, 62
- Positions: Center, Offensive tackle

Personal information
- Born: April 16, 1950; East Orange, New Jersey, U.S.
- Died: October 21, 2018 (aged 68); Raleigh, North Carolina, U.S.
- Listed height: 6 ft 2 in (1.88 m)
- Listed weight: 249 lb (113 kg)

Career information
- High school: Franklin (NJ)
- College: Lehigh
- NFL draft: 1972: 6th round, 132nd overall pick

Career history
- New York Giants (1972–1974); New Orleans Saints (1975–1984); San Francisco 49ers (1985)

Awards and highlights
- New Orleans Saints Hall of Fame; New Orleans Saints 50th Anniversary Team; First-team Little All-American (1971); Lehigh Hall of Fame

Career NFL statistics
- Games played: 177
- Games started: 147
- Fumble recoveries: 4
- Stats at Pro Football Reference

John Stark Hill (April 16, 1950 – October 21, 2018) was an American professional football center and offensive tackle for the New York Giants, New Orleans Saints, and San Francisco 49ers of the National Football League (NFL). He played college football at Lehigh University graduating with a degree in engineering. He was selected by the Giants in the sixth round of the 1972 NFL draft.

Hill played most of his career (138 games in 10 seasons) with the Saints and currently sits at 20th on the club's All-Time Games Played list. He was named to the New Orleans Saints Hall of Fame in 1992, and has been named to the team's All-25th, All-40th, All-45th, All-50th Anniversary Teams.

After leaving football, he became a State Farm insurance agent in Raleigh, North Carolina. Hill died of pancreatic cancer on October 21, 2018.
