= Charlie Goodrum =

American football player (1950–2013)

Charles Goodrum
No. 68
- Positions: Guard, tackle

Personal information
- Born: January 11, 1950; Miami, Florida, U.S.
- Died: July 6, 2013 (aged 63); Palatka, Florida, U.S.
- Listed height: 6 ft 3 in (1.91 m)
- Listed weight: 256 lb (116 kg)

Career information
- High school: Dillard (FL)
- College: Florida A&M
- NFL draft: 1972: 9th round, 232nd overall pick

Career history
- Minnesota Vikings (1973–1979)

Career NFL statistics
- Games played: 95
- Games started: 72
- Stats at Pro Football Reference

Charles Leo Goodrum (January 11, 1950 – July 6, 2013) was an American professional football guard and offensive tackle in the National Football League (NFL) for the Minnesota Vikings.

== Early life and education ==
Goodrum was born on January 11, 1950, in Miami, Florida. He graduated from Dillard High School in Fort Lauderdale, Florida. There, he played high school football. He later attended Florida A&M University where he played as an offensive lineman for the university's football team.

== Football career ==
In 1972, Goodrum was selected in the ninth round of the NFL Draft by the Minnesota Vikings. He played as guard and tackle for the Vikings during the 1970s.

Goodrum appeared in 95 games and started 72 during his time with the NFL.

== Personal life and death ==
Goodrum died on July 6, 2013, in Palatka, Florida.
