= Vernon Winfield =

American football player (born 1949)

No. 67
- Position: Guard

Personal information
- Born: August 27, 1949 (age 77); Norfolk, Virginia, U.S.
- Listed height: 6 ft 2 in (1.88 m)
- Listed weight: 248 lb (112 kg)

Career information
- High school: Minneapolis (MN) South
- College: Minnesota
- NFL draft: 1972: 6th round, 144th overall pick

Career history
- Philadelphia Eagles (1972–1973)
- Stats at Pro Football Reference

Vernon Hall Winfield (born August 27, 1949) is an American former professional football guard. He played for the Philadelphia Eagles from 1972 to 1973.
