= Cephus Weatherspoon =

American football player (born 1948)

No. 85
- Position: Wide receiver

Personal information
- Born: June 14, 1948 (age 78); Meridian, Mississippi, U.S.
- Listed height: 6 ft 1 in (1.85 m)
- Listed weight: 182 lb (83 kg)

Career information
- High school: Globe (Globe, Arizona)
- College: Fort Lewis
- NFL draft: 1972: 13th round, 320th overall pick

Career history
- New Orleans Saints (1972); New Orleans Saints (1973)*; Denver Broncos (1974)*; Southern California Sun (1975)*; Birmingham Vulcans (1975)
- * Offseason or practice squad member only
- Stats at Pro Football Reference

Cephus Weatherspoon is an American former football wide receiver who played professionally for the New Orleans Saints of the National Football League (NFL) and the Birmingham Vulcans of the World Football League (WFL). He played college football for the Fort Lewis Skyhawks.

Weatherspoon attended Fort Lewis College, where he also played basketball as a guard, after transferring from Mesa Community College. He was selected by the Saints in the 13th round of the 1972 NFL draft with the 320th overall pick. The Saints said of him that he is "A quick starter who can accelerate rapidly – and he can make nifty moves at top speed (4.6)...He has quick hands and feet and an excellent attitude." The Saints waived him towards the end of the preseason but then signed him to their taxi squad. He was activated for the Saints' November 8 game against the Minnesota Vikings when linebacker Ray Hester and running back Arthur Green were injured and played mostly on special teams. He was returned to the taxi squad after the game.

Saints' coach J.D. Roberts felt that Weatherspoon had improved going into the 1973 preseason. But Roberts was fired during the preseason, and Weatherspoon was cut without playing a regular season game that season. In 1974, he signed with the Denver Broncos but was cut before the season began.

In 1975, Weatherspoon signed with the Southern California Sun of the World Football League along with his brother Ed, a defensive back who had previously been with the Houston Oilers during the 1973 preseason. Cephus was traded to the Vulcans at the end of July, just before the regular season began. In the opening game against the Chicago Winds on August 2 he caught a 53-yard pass from Matthew Reed to set up the Vulcans' only touchdown in their victory. That was to be Weatherspoon's only reception as a pro. Ed remained with the Sun, where he intercepted two passes and returned two punts before being waived in September. The league folded before the end of the 1975 season. In 1976 and 1977 Weatherspoon played semi-pro football.

In 2012, Weatherspoon joined a lawsuit against the National Football League alleging concussion-related injuries from playing.
