= Calvin Demery =

American football player (born 1950)

No. 27
- Position: Wide receiver

Personal information
- Born: August 17, 1950 (age 76); Phoenix, Arizona, U.S.
- Listed height: 6 ft 1 in (1.85 m)
- Listed weight: 190 lb (86 kg)

Career information
- High school: Phoenix (AZ) South Mountain
- College: Arizona State
- NFL draft: 1972: 8th round, 206th overall pick

Career history
- Minnesota Vikings (1972)
- Stats at Pro Football Reference

Calvin Demery (born August 17, 1950) is an American former professional football wide receiver. He played for the Minnesota Vikings in 1972.
