= Greg Oliver (American football) =

American football player (1949–2012)

- Oliver, circa 1973

No. 48
- Position: Fullback

Personal information
- Born: January 15, 1949; San Antonio, Texas, U.S.
- Died: January 6, 2012 (aged 62); San Antonio, Texas, U.S.
- Listed height: 6 ft 0 in (1.83 m)
- Listed weight: 192 lb (87 kg)

Career information
- High school: Brackenridge (San Antonio)
- College: Trinity
- NFL draft: 1973: 17th round, 419th overall pick

Career history
- Philadelphia Eagles (1973–1974); New England Patriots (1976)*
- * Offseason or practice squad member only
- Stats at Pro Football Reference

Gregory Curtis Oliver (January 15, 1949 – January 6, 2012) was an American professional football fullback who played for the Philadelphia Eagles of the National Football League (NFL). He played college football for the Trinity Tigers and was selected by the Eagles in the 17th round of the 1973 NFL draft.

== Early life ==
Gregory Curtis Oliver was born on January 15, 1949, in San Antonio, Texas. He played high school football at Brackenridge High School in San Antonio as a two-way fullback/linebacker.

== College career ==
Oliver played junior college football at Ranger College as a fullback and linebacker. He was recruited to Trinity University to play linebacker. However, in spring 1970, he converted strictly to fullback. Oliver played for the Tigers from 1970 to 1972. He became the school's all-time leading rusher with 2,313 yards and 25 touchdowns. He also scored one receiving touchdown.

== Professional career ==
Oliver was selected by the Philadelphia Eagles in the 17th round, with the 419th overall pick, of the 1973 NFL draft. He played in 25 games for the Eagles from 1973 to 1974 as a reserve fullback, totaling eight carries for 25 yards, one reception for nine yards, one kick return for 17 yards, and one fumble recovery. He was released on September 9, 1975, after the fifth of six preseason games.

Oliver signed with the New England Patriots in April 1976. He was released on September, 6 after the final game of the 1976 preseason.

== Personal life ==
Oliver had four children. He died on January 6, 2012, in San Antonio.
