= Mike Crangle =

American football player (born 1947)

No. 75
- Position: Defensive end

Personal information
- Born: February 3, 1947 (age 79); Chicago, Illinois, U.S.
- Listed height: 6 ft 4 in (1.93 m)
- Listed weight: 243 lb (110 kg)

Career information
- High school: Hower (OH); Central (OH)
- College: Cincinnati (1968–1969); UT Martin (1970–1971)
- NFL draft: 1972: 4th round, 85th overall pick

Career history
- New Orleans Saints (1972); Oakland Raiders (1973)*
- * Offseason or practice squad member only

Career NFL statistics
- Games played: 13
- Stats at Pro Football Reference

Michael Crangle (born February 3, 1947) is an American former professional football player who was a defensive end for one season with the New Orleans Saints of the National Football League (NFL). He played college football for the Cincinnati Bearcats and UT Martin Skyhawks and was a fourth-round selection in the 1972 NFL draft by the Saints. He also had a stint with the Oakland Raiders.

== Early life ==
Crangle was born on February 3, 1947, in Chicago, Illinois. He attended Hower High School in Ohio for three seasons. He played football as a junior but was not allowed to play as a senior as he transferred to Central High School in Akron. He played basketball in his one year at Central, helping them reach the state playoff semifinals. After graduating, he worked as a sailor in the Great Lakes for one year before being drafted to serve in the United States Army. He was stationed at Virginia Beach from May 1966 to May 1968, playing for a military service basketball team.

== College career ==
After being discharged from the Army, Crangle was offered an athletic scholarship to play football for the Cincinnati Bearcats, which he accepted. He started at defensive tackle on the freshman team in 1968, before joining the varsity in 1969 and being one of their starting defensive ends. He quit the team in November 1969 in an event shrouded in mystery, as team officials refused to discuss and a university release stated he left the team for "personal reasons." It was assumed the reason he left the team was due to a dispute occurring against Louisville, where he allegedly cast a racial slur against an African-American player.

Crangle transferred to UT Martin in 1970 and was able to play immediately due to UT Martin being an NAIA team. He was named All-Conference as both a junior and senior and was also named All-District as well as All-Mid South in his final year. He was invited to the North–South All-Star Game and to the Senior Bowl after the conclusion of his college career. He was credited with 134 tackles, 42 sacks, 33 pass breakups and seven fumble recoveries in his two seasons at UT Martin.

== Professional career ==
Crangle was selected in the fourth round (85th overall) of the 1972 NFL draft by the New Orleans Saints. He signed his rookie contract on April 15. Prior to the regular season opener, he was waived and re-signed to the taxi squad. He was activated shortly afterwards and appeared in a total of 13 out of the Saints' 14 games. He was a backup in each game and recorded no statistics as the Saints finished the season with a record of 2–11–1. In June 1973, Crangle was traded to the Oakland Raiders for an undisclosed draft pick. He left the team in mid-July. Crangle did not play with any other teams afterwards, thus finishing his career with 13 games played, none as a starter.
