= Bart Buetow =

American football player (born 1950)

No. 60, 74
- Position: Tackle

Personal information
- Born: October 28, 1950 (age 76); Minneapolis, Minnesota, U.S.
- Listed height: 6 ft 5 in (1.96 m)
- Listed weight: 250 lb (113 kg)

Career information
- High school: Arden Hills (MN) Mounds View
- College: Minnesota
- NFL draft: 1972: 3rd round, 59th overall pick

Career history
- Minnesota Vikings (1972)*; New York Giants (1972–1973); Denver Broncos (1976)*; Minnesota Vikings (1976–1977); Washington Redskins (1978)*
- * Offseason or practice squad member only
- Stats at Pro Football Reference

Bart Buetow (born October 28, 1950) is an American former professional football tackle. He played for the New York Giants in 1973 and for the Minnesota Vikings in 1976.
