= 1978 New York Giants season =

NFL team season

- Owner: Wellington Mara
- Head coach: John McVay
- Home stadium: Giants Stadium

Results
- Record: 6–10
- Division place: 5th NFC East
- Playoffs: Did not qualify
- Pro Bowlers: LB Brad van Pelt; LB Harry Carson; P Dave Jennings

The 1978 New York Giants season was the franchise's 54th season in the National Football League. In their first ever season that had a sixteen-game schedule, the Giants looked to improve on their 5–9 record from 1977. The season saw the Giants get off to a hot start. They beat newcomer Tampa Bay in Tampa 19–13, despite being a 1 point underdog. After a close loss to the rival Cowboys 34–24 the next week, the Giants beat the Kansas City Chiefs 26–10 and the San Francisco 49ers 27–10 to start the season 3–1, their first 3–1 start since 1969. However, the Giants then started to struggle, losing to the Atlanta Falcons 23–20 and the Cowboys again 24–3.

Following wins at home against the Buccaneers and Redskins, the Giants went on a downfall, which saw them lose their next 6 games and 7 of their last 8. In week 12, the Giants played their arch-rivals, the Philadelphia Eagles, in a crucial game that saw the Giants fumble away the game on Joe Pisarcik’s fumble and Herm Edwards fumble recovery for a touchdown that won the game for Philadelphia, 19–17. The play was dubbed the Miracle at the Meadowlands. The Giants never recovered from this game, getting pummeled on the road to the Bills, 41–17, despite having a 10 point lead in the 3rd quarter. In their final game, a rematch with Philadelphia, the Giants lost 20–3 to end the season 6–10.

== Offseason ==
=== Draft ===
1978 New York Giants draft
Round	Pick	Player	Position	College	Notes
1	10	Gordon King	OT	Stanford	
2	37	Odis McKinney	DB	Colorado	
4	90	Billy Taylor	RB	Texas Tech	
5	120	Terry Jackson	DB	San Diego St	
5	132	Jim Krahl	DT	Texas Tech	
5	137	Brian DeRoo	WR	Redlands	
6	147	Randy Pass	OG	Georgia Tech	
7	174	Dan Doornink	RB	Washington St	
8	201	Jeff Grady	LB	Florida A&M	
9	232	Bill Swiacki	TE	Amherst	
10	253	Greg Jorgensen	OG	Nebraska	
11	286	Dennis Helm	DT	SW Missouri St	
12	313	Greg Lawson	RB	Western Illinois	
Made roster † Pro Football Hall of Fame * Made at least one Pro Bowl during career

== Roster ==
1978 New York Giants roster
Quarterbacks (QB): 17 Fred Besana; 15 Randy Dean; 12 Jerry Golsteyn; 9 Joe Pisarcik; Running backs (RB): 39 Larry Csonka; 35 Dan Doornink; 33 Bobby Hammond; 44 Doug Kotar; 31 Willie Spencer; 38 Billy Taylor; Wide receivers (WR): 80 Emery Moorehead; 86 Johnny Perkins; 82 Ernie Pough; 85 Jimmy Robinson; Tight ends (TE): 84 Al Dixon; 87 Gary Shirk	Offensive linemen (OL): 73 Bill Bain T; 60 Brad Benson T; 56 Jim Clack C; 71 Gordon Gravelle T; 76 Jim Pietrzak T; 52 Leo Tierney C; 68 J. T. Turner G; 63 Doug Van Horn G; Defensive linemen (DL): 77 Troy Archer DT; 79 Larry Gillard DT; 81 Jack Gregory DE; 74 Jim Krahl DT; 75 George Martin DE; 64 John Mendenhall DT	Linebackers (LB): 53 Harry Carson MLB; 59 Randy Coffield OLB; 55 Brian Kelley OLB; 54 Dan Lloyd OLB; 51 Frank Marion OLB; 57 John Skorupan MLB; 10 Brad Van Pelt OLB; Defensive backs (DB): 24 Terry Jackson CB; 31 Ernie Jones FS; 34 Larry Mallory SS; 23 Odis McKinney CB/S; 22 Ray Rhodes CB; 25 Maurice Tyler FS; Special teams (ST): 18 Joe Danelo K; 13 Dave Jennings P	Reserve: 28 Beasley Reece S (IR); -- Brian DeRoo WR (IR); 70 Gary Jeter DT (IR); 72 Gordon King T (IR); 36 Alvin Maxson RB (IR); 62 Ron Mikolajczyk T (IR); 89 James Thompson WR (IR); Rookies in italics

== Regular season ==
The Miracle at the Meadowlands is the term used by sportscasters and Philadelphia Eagles fans for a fumble recovery by cornerback Herman Edwards that he returned for a touchdown at the end of a November 19, 1978 NFL game against the New York Giants in Giants Stadium. It was seen as miraculous because it occurred at a point in the game when the Giants were easily capable of running out the game's final seconds. The Giants had the ball, and the Eagles had no timeouts left. Everyone watching expected quarterback Joe Pisarcik to take one more snap and kneel with the ball, thus running out the clock and preserving a 17–12 Giant upset. Instead, he attempted to hand it off to fullback Larry Csonka and botched it, allowing Edwards to pick up the ball and run 26 yards for the winning score.

=== Schedule ===
Week	Date	Opponent	Result	Record	Attendance
1	September 2	at Tampa Bay Buccaneers	**W** 19–13	1–0	67,456
2	September 10	**Dallas Cowboys**	**L** 24–34	1–1	73,265
3	September 17	Kansas City Chiefs	**W** 26–10	2–1	70,546
4	September 24	San Francisco 49ers	**W** 27–10	3–1	71,536
5	October 1	at Atlanta Falcons	**L** 20–23	3–2	47,765
6	October 8	at **Dallas Cowboys**	**L** 3–24	3–3	63,420
7	October 15	Tampa Bay Buccaneers	**W** 17–14	4–3	68,025
8	October 22	**Washington Redskins**	**W** 17–6	5–3	76,192
9	October 29	at New Orleans Saints	**L** 17–28	5–4	59,807
10	November 5	at **St. Louis Cardinals**	**L** 10–20	5–5	48,820
11	November 12	at **Washington Redskins**	**L** 13–16	5–6	53,271
12	November 19	**Philadelphia Eagles**	**L** 17–19	5–7	70,318
13	November 26	at Buffalo Bills	**L** 17–41	5–8	28,496
14	December 3	Los Angeles Rams	**L** 17–20	5–9	62,629
15	December 10	**St. Louis Cardinals**	**W** 17–0	6–9	52,226
16	December 17	at **Philadelphia Eagles**	**L** 3–20	6–10	56,396

Note: Intra-division opponents are in bold text.

=== Game summaries ===
==== Week 4 ====
- Television Network: CBS
- Announcers: Don Criqui and Tom Matte

Joe Pisarcik threw a 29-yard touchdown pass to Al Dixon early in the game and Bobby Hammond set up two other touchdowns with long runs as the Giants are so far surprising the football world with a 3-1 record with a win over winless San Francsico. New York's Larry Csonka became the sixth player in NFL history to rush for 7,000 yards and he himself scored a 1-yard touchdown run in period 1 while Willie Spencer of the Giants scored a 1-yard touchdown run in period 3 while Joe Danelo kicked two field goals of 28 and 52 yards to provide the Giants scoring that day.

==== Week 12 ====
Philadelphia Eagles (6–5) at New York Giants (5–6)

Quarter	1	2	3	4	Total
Eagles	0	6	0	13	**19**
Giants	14	0	3	0	**17**

at Giants Stadium • East Rutherford, New Jersey

- Date: November 19
- Game time: 1:00 p.m. EST
- Game weather: 49 °F (9 °C) • Wind 14 mph (23 km/h)
- Game attendance: 70,318
- Referee: Cal Lepore
- Pro-Football-Reference.com

Game information

Eagles

- Ron Jaworski
  15/31, 164 Yds, 3 INT
- Wilbert Montgomery
  22 Rush, 88 Yds, TD
- Harold Carmichael
  5 Rec, 105 Yds

Giants

- Joe Pisarcik
  13/24, 181 Yds, 2 TD, INT
- Doug Kotar
  13 Rush, 36 Yds
- Jim Robinson
  4 Rec, 73 Yds

Scoring summary

Quarter	Time	Drive			Team	Scoring information	Score	
Quarter	Time	Plays	Yards	TOP	Team	Scoring information	PHI	NYG
1					Giants	Hammond 19-yard touchdown reception from Pisarcik, Danelo kick good	0	7
1					Giants	Perkins 30-yard touchdown reception from Pisarcik, Danelo kick good	0	14
2					Eagles	Montgomery 8-yard touchdown run, kick no good	6	14
3					Giants	37-yard field goal by Danelo	6	17
4					Eagles	Hogan 1-yard touchdown run, kick no good	12	17
4	0:20				Eagles	Fumble recovery returned 26 yards for touchdown by Herm Edwards, Michel kick good	19	17
"TOP" = time of possession. For other American football terms, see Glossary of American football.							19	17

==== Week 13 ====
Week Thirteen: New York Giants (5–7) at Buffalo Bills (3–9)

Quarter	1	2	3	4	Total
Giants	7	3	7	0	**17**
**Bills**	7	0	7	27	**41**

at Rich Stadium, Orchard Park, New York

- Date: November 26, 1978
- Game time: 1:00 p.m. EDT
- Game weather: 23 °F (−5 °C)
- Game attendance: 28,496
- Referee: Red Cashion
- TV announcers (CBS): Pat Summerall and Tom Brookshier
- Box Score

Game information

**First quarter**

- NYG – Al Dixon 31-yard pass from Joe Pisarcik (Joe Danelo kick). Giants 7–0.
- BUF – Curtis Brown 1-yard run (Tom Dempsey kick). Tie 7–7.

**Second quarter**

- NYG – Joe Danelo 27-yard field goal. Giants 10–7.

**Third quarter**

- NYG – Doug Kotar 19-yard pass from Joe Pisarcik (Joe Danelo kick). Giants 17–7.
- BUF – Roland Hooks 1-yard run (Tom Dempsey kick). Giants 17–14.

**Fourth quarter**

- BUF – Curtis Brown 1-yard run (Tom Dempsey kick). Bills 21–17.
- BUF – Lou Piccone 9-yard pass from Joe Ferguson (Tom Dempsey kick). Bills 28–17.
- BUF – Terry Miller 39-yard run (Tom Dempsey kick). Bills 35–17.
- BUF – Terry Miller 13-yard run (kick failed). Bills 41–17.

Top passers

- NYG – Joe Pisarcik – 15/24, 230 yards, 2 TD, INT
- BUF – Joe Ferguson – 9/15, 106 yards, TD, INT

Top rushers

- NYG – Bobby Hammond – 15 rushes, 60 yards
- BUF – Terry Miller – 21 rushes, 208 yards, 2 TD

Top receivers

- NYG – Al Dixon – 2 receptions, 78 yards, TD
- BUF – Bob Chandler – 5 receptions, 75 yards

== Standings ==
NFC East
	W	L	T	PCT	DIV	CONF	PF	PA	STK
Dallas Cowboys^{(2)}	12	4	0	.750	7–1	9–3	384	208	W6
Philadelphia Eagles^{(5)}	9	7	0	.563	4–4	6–6	270	250	W1
Washington Redskins	8	8	0	.500	4–4	6–6	273	283	L5
St. Louis Cardinals	6	10	0	.375	3–5	6–6	248	296	W1
New York Giants	6	10	0	.375	2–6	5–9	264	298	L1

== See also ==
- List of New York Giants seasons
