= 1977 New York Giants season =

NFL team season

- Owner: Wellington Mara; Timothy J. Mara
- Head coach: John McVay
- Home stadium: Giants Stadium

Results
- Record: 5–9
- Division place: T-4th NFC East
- Playoffs: Did not qualify
- Pro Bowlers: LB Brad Van Pelt

The 1977 New York Giants season was the franchise's 53rd season in the National Football League (NFL). The Giants had a 5–9 record in 1977 and finished in a tie for last place with the Philadelphia Eagles.

The Giants selected defensive end Gary Jeter in the 1977 NFL draft with the fifth overall pick. Before the season, the Giants signed quarterback Joe Pisarcik, who won the starting position to replace Craig Morton, whom they had traded to the Denver Broncos. New York won their opening game of the year against the Washington Redskins, prevailing 20–17 on a field goal by Joe Danelo in the final seconds. After losses in their next three games, victories over the San Francisco 49ers and Washington Redskins evened the Giants’ record at 3–3. Afterwards, New York lost six of their last eight games. With a season-ending 12–9 defeat by the Chicago Bears in overtime, the team concluded the year at 5–9.

Offensively, New York's season total of 181 points was lower than all but four of the 27 other NFL teams. Pisarcik started 11 of the Giants' 14 games in 1977 and threw for 1,346 yards, but had 14 passes intercepted and only four touchdowns. Bobby Hammond led the Giants in rushing with 154 carries for 577 yards. Doug Kotar and Larry Csonka also rushed for more than 450 yards each. The team's leading receiver statistically was Jimmy Robinson, who caught 22 passes for 422 yards and three touchdowns. Gary Shirk was the only other Giants player with multiple touchdown catches, while Johnny Perkins was second behind Robinson with 20 receptions. On defense, cornerback Bill Bryant led New York with three interceptions. For the second consecutive season, linebacker Brad Van Pelt was the only Giant to make the Pro Bowl.

== Offseason ==
=== NFL draft ===
1977 New York Giants draft
Round	Pick	Player	Position	College	Notes
1	5	Gary Jeter	DE	USC	
2	32	Johnny Perkins	WR	Abilene Christian	
4	88	Mike Vaughan	T	Oklahoma	
5	117	Randy Dean	QB	Northwestern	
Made roster † Pro Football Hall of Fame * Made at least one Pro Bowl during career

== Personnel ==
=== Staff ===
1977 New York Giants staff
Front office: Co-Owner – Tim Mara; Co-Owner / President – Wellington Mara; General manager / Director of Operations – Andy Robustelli; Director of Player Personnel – Jim Lee Howell; Director of Pro Personnel – Jim Trimble; Scouts – Roosevelt Brown, Ken Kavanaugh, Ed Rutledge; Head coaches: Head coach – John McVay; Offensive coaches: Offensive Coordinator – Bob Gibson; Chief Assistant / Offensive Line – Jay Fry; Wide Receivers – Lindy Infante	Defensive coaches: Defensive Coordinaton / Linebackers – Marty Schottenheimer; Defensive Line – Joe Galat; Defensive Backfield – Jim Symank; Defensive Assistant – John McVay; Special teams coaches: Special Teams / Kickers – Allan Webb

=== Roster ===
1977 New York Giants roster
Quarterbacks (QB): 15 Randy Dean; 12 Jerry Golsteyn; 9 Joe Pisarcik; Running backs (RB): 25 Gordon Bell; 39 Larry Csonka; 33 Bobby Hammond; 30 Harold Hart; 44 Doug Kotar; 31 Willie Spencer; 36 Larry Watkins; Wide receivers (WR): 89 Ed Marshall; 80 Emery Moorehead; 86 Johnny Perkins; 85 Jimmy Robinson; Tight ends (TE): 83 Boyd Brown; 87 Gary Shirk	Offensive linemen (OL): 60 Brad Benson T; 61 Karl Chandler C; 65 Bill Ellenbogen T; 79 Mike Gibbons G; 71 Gordon Gravelle T; 74 John Hicks G; 52 Ralph Hill C; 62 Ron Mikolajczyk T; 63 Doug Van Horn G; Defensive linemen (DL): 77 Troy Archer DT; 81 Jack Gregory DE; 70 Gary Jeter DE; 75 George Martin DE; 64 John Mendenhall DT; 76 Jim Pietrzak DT; 68 J. T. Turner DT	Linebackers (LB): 53 Harry Carson MLB; 55 Brian Kelley OLB; 54 Dan Lloyd OLB; 57 Andy Selfridge OLB; 10 Brad Van Pelt OLB; Defensive backs (DB): 21 Bill Bryant CB; 31 Ernie Jones CB; 34 Larry Mallory FS; 29 Clyde Powers SS; 22 Ray Rhodes CB; 20 Jim Stienke FS; Special teams (ST): 18 Joe Danelo K; 13 Dave Jennings P	Reserve: 84 Al Dixon TE (IR); -- Dave Gallagher DE (Retired); 51 Frank Marion LB (IR); 73 Tom Mullen T (IR); 28 Beasley Reece S (IR); -- Pete Rome CB (IR); -- Mike Vaughan T (IR); 24 Marsh White RB (IR); -- Bill Winters G (NF-Ill.); Rookies in italics

== Schedule ==
Week	Date	Opponent	Result	Record	Attendance
1	September 18	**Washington Redskins**	**W** 20–17	1–0	76,086
2	September 25	at **Dallas Cowboys**	**L** 21–41	1–1	64,215
3	October 2	at Atlanta Falcons	**L** 3–17	1–2	46,374
4	October 9	**Philadelphia Eagles**	**L** 10–28	1–3	48,824
5	October 16	San Francisco 49ers	**W** 20–17	2–3	70,366
6	October 23	at **Washington Redskins**	**W** 17–6	3–3	53,903
7	October 31	at **St. Louis Cardinals**	**L** 0–28	3–4	50,323
8	November 6	**Dallas Cowboys**	**L** 10–24	3–5	74,532
9	November 13	at Tampa Bay Buccaneers	**W** 10–0	4–5	46,518
10	November 20	Cleveland Browns	**L** 7–21	4–6	72,576
11	November 27	at Cincinnati Bengals	**L** 13–30	4–7	32,705
12	December 4	**St. Louis Cardinals**	**W** 27–7	5–7	71,826
13	December 11	at **Philadelphia Eagles**	**L** 14–17	5–8	47,731
14	December 18	Chicago Bears	**L** 9–12 (OT)	5–9	50,152

Note: Intra-division opponents are in bold text.

=== Game summaries ===
==== Week 3 ====
- TV Station: CBS
- TV Announcers: Lindsey Nelson, Paul Hornung

Atlanta Falcons quarterback Scott Hunter set up Monroe Eley's one-yard plunge early in the second period with an 18-yard bootleg and backup quarterback Kim McQuilken led an 80-yard scoring drive in the final period to give the Falcons a 17–3 win over the Giants.

==== Week 5 ====
- TV Station: CBS
- TV Announcers: Vin Scully, Alex Hawkins

Joe Pisarcik's 37-yard touchdown pass to tight end Gary Shirk and a pair of field goals by Joe Danelo helped give New York a narrow 20–17 victory, their first in four games. 49ers quarterback Jim Plunkett started a San Francisco rally. Touchdowns by Wilbur Jackson on a one-yard run and wide receiver Gene Washington on a 47-yard pass made the game close.

==== Week 6 ====
Team	1	2	3	4	Total
• Giants	0	0	7	10	17
Redskins	3	3	0	0	6

- Date: October 23
- Location: RFK Stadium
- Game start: 1:00 p.m. EST
- Game weather: 60 °F (15.6 °C), wind 11 miles per hour (18 km/h; 9.6 kn)
- TV announcers (CBS): Pat Summerall, Tom Brookshier

Scoring summary
1	WSH	Mark Moseley 35 yard field goal	Redskins 3–0
2	WSH	Mark Moseley 45 yard field goal	Redskins 6–0
3	NYG	Doug Kotar 17 yard run (Joe Danelo kick)	Giants 7–6
4	NYG	Jimmy Robinson 23 yard pass from Joe Pisarcik (Joe Danelo kick)	Giants 14–6
4	NYG	Joe Danelo 20 yard field goal	Giants 17–6

==== Week 14 ====
Team	1	2	3	4	OT	Total
• Bears	3	0	0	6	3	12
Giants	3	0	0	6	0	9

- Date: December 18
- Location: Giants Stadium – East Rutherford, New Jersey
- Game start: 1:00 p.m. EST
- Game weather: 36 °F (2 °C) • 16 miles per hour (26 km/h; 14 kn)
- TV announcers (NFL on CBS): Vin Scully, Johnny Morris, and Alex Hawkins

=== Standings ===
NFC East
	W	L	T	PCT	DIV	CONF	PF	PA	STK
^{(1)} Dallas Cowboys	12	2	0	.857	7–1	11–1	345	212	W4
Washington Redskins	9	5	0	.643	4–4	8–4	196	189	W3
St. Louis Cardinals	7	7	0	.500	4–4	7–5	272	287	L4
Philadelphia Eagles	5	9	0	.357	2–6	4–8	220	207	W2
New York Giants	5	9	0	.357	3–5	5–7	181	265	L2
