= 1979 New York Giants season =

NFL team season

- Owner: Timothy J. Mara; Wellington Mara
- General manager: George Young
- Head coach: Ray Perkins
- Home stadium: Giants Stadium

Results
- Record: 6–10
- Division place: 4th NFC East
- Playoffs: Did not qualify
- Pro Bowlers: Brad Van Pelt; Harry Carson; Dave Jennings

The 1979 New York Giants season was the franchise's 55th season in the National Football League (NFL). The Giants had a 6–10 record in 1979 and finished in fourth place in the National Football Conference East Division.

The Giants were one of three franchises, not including the Seattle Seahawks (an expansion team that began play in 1976), which did not make the playoffs during any year of the 1970s. The others were the New York Jets and New Orleans Saints.

== Offseason ==
Before the 1979 NFL Draft, Bill Walsh, who was the new coach of the San Francisco 49ers, flew to Morehead State University with assistant coach Sam Wyche to work out quarterback Phil Simms. Walsh was so impressed with him that he planned to draft Simms, actually preferring him over another young quarterback they scouted and ultimately drafted, Joe Montana. The Giants, however, decided to make Simms their first-round pick to the surprise of many. As Simms acknowledged, "most people have never heard of me." When Simms' name was announced by Commissioner Pete Rozelle, his selection was booed loudly by Giants fans. However, he became more popular with his teammates, who jokingly dubbed him "Prince Valiant" in his rookie training camp.

=== Draft ===
1979 New York Giants draft
Round	Pick	Player	Position	College	Notes
1	7	Phil Simms *	QB	Morehead State	
2	36	Earnest Gray	WR	Memphis	
4	90	Phil Tabor	DE	Oklahoma	
5	117	Cleveland Jackson	TE	UNLV	
6	145	Bob Torrey	RB	Penn State	
6	158	Eddie Hicks	RB	East Carolina	
7	172	Steve Alvers	TE	Miami (FL)	
8	200	D.K. Perry	DB	SMU	
8	201	Roy Simmons	OG	Georgia Tech	
9	227	Tom Rusk	LB	Iowa	
10	256	Dan Fowler	OG	Kentucky	
11	282	Mike Mince	DB	Fresno State	
11	284	Ken Johnson	RB	Miami (FL)	
12	310	Tim Gillespie	OG	NC State	
Made roster † Pro Football Hall of Fame * Made at least one Pro Bowl during career

== Personnel ==
=== Staff ===
1979 New York Giants staff
Front office: President – Wellington Mara; General manager – George Young; Director of Pro Personnel – Jim Trimble; Head coaches: Head coach – Ray Perkins; Offensive coaches: Offensive Backfield – Bob Lord; Receivers – Pat Hodgson; Offensive Line – Bill Austin; Offensive Assistant – Ernie Adams	Defensive coaches: Defensive Coordinator – Ralph Hawkins; Defensive Line – Jim Stanley; Linebackers – Ralph Hawkins; Defensive Backfield – Deek Pollard; Special teams coaches: Special Teams – Bill Belichick

=== Roster ===
1979 New York Giants roster
Quarterbacks (QB): 15 Randy Dean; 17 David Rader; 11 Phil Simms; Running backs (RB): 34 Zachary Dixon; 41 George Franklin; 29 Eddie Hicks; 44 Doug Kotar; 38 Billy Taylor; Wide receivers (WR): 83 Earnest Gray; 84 Steve Odom; 86 Johnny Perkins; 85 Jimmy Robinson; 88 Dwight Scales; Tight ends (TE): 89 Loaird McCreary; 81 Tom Mullady; 87 Gary Shirk	Offensive linemen (OL): 60 Brad Benson T; 56 Jim Clack C; 78 Gus Coppens T; 58 Keith Eck C; 72 Gordon King T; 74 Tom Neville T; 69 Roy Simmons G; 68 J. T. Turner G; 63 Doug Van Horn G; Defensive linemen (DL): 70 Gary Jeter DE; 75 George Martin DE; 64 John Mendenhall DT; 76 Calvin Miller DT; 80 Phil Tabor DT; 73 Jeff Weston DE	Linebackers (LB): 53 Harry Carson MLB; 59 Randy Coffield OLB; 55 Brian Kelley OLB; 51 Frank Marion OLB; 57 John Skorupan MLB; 10 Brad Van Pelt OLB; Defensive backs (DB): 45 Alan Caldwell CB; 24 Terry Jackson CB; 23 Odis McKinney FS; 25 Ray Oldham FS; 28 Beasley Reece SS; 22 Ray Rhodes CB; Special teams (ST): 18 Joe Danelo K; 13 Dave Jennings P	Reserve: —- Steve Alvers TE (IR); 81 Cleveland Jackson TE (IR); 48 Kenny Johnson RB (IR); 31 Ernie Jones S (IR); 54 Dan Lloyd LB (IR); 79 Mike McCoy DT (IR); 62 Ron Mikolajczyk T (IR); 30 Emery Moorehead RB (IR); 9 Joe Pisarcik QB (IR); Rookies in italics

== Regular season ==
Simms won his first four starts in his rookie year. He led the team to a 6–5 record as a starter, throwing for 1,743 yards and 13 touchdown passes, and was named to the NFL All Rookie Team. According to his 1981 Topps trading card, he was runner-up in 1979 for Rookie of the Year, losing out to future teammate Ottis Anderson.

=== Schedule ===
Week	Date	Opponent	Result	Record	Venue	Attendance
1	September 2	at **Philadelphia Eagles**	**L** 17–23	0–1	Veterans Stadium	67,366
2	September 9	**St. Louis Cardinals**	**L** 14–27	0–2	Giants Stadium	71,370
3	September 17	at **Washington Redskins**	**L** 0–27	0–3	RFK Stadium	54,672
4	September 23	**Philadelphia Eagles**	**L** 13–17	0–4	Giants Stadium	74,265
5	September 30	at New Orleans Saints	**L** 14–24	0–5	Louisiana Superdome	51,543
6	October 7	Tampa Bay Buccaneers	**W** 17–14	1–5	Giants Stadium	72,841
7	October 14	San Francisco 49ers	**W** 32–16	2–5	Giants Stadium	70,352
8	October 21	at Kansas City Chiefs	**W** 21–17	3–5	Arrowhead Stadium	44,362
9	October 28	at Los Angeles Rams	**W** 20–14	4–5	Los Angeles Memorial Coliseum	43,376
10	November 4	**Dallas Cowboys**	**L** 14–16	4–6	Giants Stadium	76,490
11	November 11	Atlanta Falcons	**W** 24–3	5–6	Giants Stadium	60,860
12	November 18	at Tampa Bay Buccaneers	**L** 3–31	5–7	Tampa Stadium	70,261
13	November 25	**Washington Redskins**	**W** 14–6	6–7	Giants Stadium	72,641
14	December 2	at **Dallas Cowboys**	**L** 7–28	6–8	Texas Stadium	63,787
15	December 9	at **St. Louis Cardinals**	**L** 20–29	6–9	Busch Memorial Stadium	39,802
16	December 16	Baltimore Colts	**L** 7–31	6–10	Giants Stadium	58,711

Note: Intra-division opponents are in bold text.

== Game summaries ==
=== Week 6 ===
Team	1	2	3	4	Total
Buccaneers	0	7	0	7	14
• Giants	0	14	0	3	17

- Date: October 7
- Location: Giants Stadium, East Rutherford, New Jersey
- Game start: 1:00 p.m.
- Game weather: 60 °F or 15.6 °C, wind 16 miles per hour (26 km/h; 14 kn)
- TV announcers (CBS): Curt Gowdy and Hank Stram

Scoring summary
2	NYG	Billy Taylor 2 yard run (Joe Danelo kick)	Giants 7–0
2	NYG	Billy Taylor 1 yard run (Joe Danelo kick)	Giants 14–0
2	TB	Larry Mucker 14 yard pass from Doug Williams (Neil O'Donoghue kick)	Giants 14–7
4	NYG	Joe Danelo 47 yard field goal	Giants 17–7
4	TB	Jimmie Giles 11 yard pass from Doug Williams (Neil O'Donoghue kick)	Giants 17–14

== Standings ==
NFC East
	W	L	T	PCT	DIV	CONF	PF	PA	STK
^{(1)} Dallas Cowboys	11	5	0	.688	6–2	10–2	371	313	W3
^{(4)} Philadelphia Eagles	11	5	0	.688	6–2	9–3	339	282	W1
Washington Redskins	10	6	0	.625	5–3	8–4	348	295	L1
New York Giants	6	10	0	.375	1–7	5–9	237	323	L3
St. Louis Cardinals	5	11	0	.313	2–6	4–8	307	358	L1

== See also ==
- 1979 NFL season
