= 1974 All-South Independent football team =

American college football season

The 1974 All-South Independent football team consists of American football players chosen by the Associated Press for their All-South independent teams for the 1974 NCAA Division I football season.

== Offense ==
Quarterback

- Fred Solomon, Tampa (AP-1)
- Jeff Bower, Southern Mississippi (AP-2)

Running backs

- Jay Lynn Hodgin, South Carolina (AP-1)
- David Sims, Georgia Tech (AP-1)
- Larry Key, Florida State (AP-2)
- Phil Rogers, Virginia Tech (AP-2)

Wide receivers

- Ricky Scales, Virginia Tech (AP-1)
- Mike Shumann, Florida State (AP-1)
- Jimmy Robinson, Georgia Tech (AP-2)
- James Thompson, Memphis (AP-2)

Tight end

- John Sawyer, Southern Mississippi (AP-1)
- Darwin Willie, Tulane (AP-2)

Tackles

- Dennis Harrah, Miami (AP-1)
- Ed Mikkelsen, Tulane (AP-1)
- Darryl Carlton, Tampa (AP-2)
- Buck Thompson, South Carolina (AP-2)

Guards

- Mike Arthur, Tulane (AP-1)
- Billy Shields, Georgia Tech (AP-1)
- Bill Capraun, Miami (AP-2)
- Mark Brookover, Marshall (AP-2)

Center

- Terry Woodfork, Tampa (AP-1)
- Cameron Gaston, Tulane (AP-2)

== Defense ==
Defensive linemen

- Charles Hall, Tulane (AP-1)
- Rubin Carter, Miami (AP-1)
- Mark Olivari, Tulane (AP-1)
- Ken Niemaseck, Memphis (AP-1)
- Va Anderson, Memphis (AP-2)
- Greg Johnson, Florida State (AP-2)
- Mike Smith, Southern Mississippi (AP-2)
- Ervin Smith, Tampa (AP-2)

Linebackers

- Joe Harris, Georgia Tech (AP-1)
- Bert Cooper, Florida State (AP-1)
- Ron Cheatham, Southern Mississippi (AP-1)
- Rusty Chambers, Tulane (AP-1)
- Greg Pittman, Tampa (AP-2)
- Jerry Dandridge, Memphis (AP-2)
- Rich Griffith, Miami (AP-2)
- Lucius Sanford, Georgia (AP-2)

Defensive backs

- Randy Rhino, Georgia Tech (AP-1)
- Rick Gemel, Southern Mississippi (AP-1)
- Ernie Jones, Miami (AP-1)
- Eric Harris, Memphis (AP-2)
- David Lee, Tulane (AP-2)
- Norris Thomas, Southern Mississippi (AP-2)

== Special teams ==
Kicker

- Bobby Williams, Memphis (AP-1)
- Danny Smith, Georgia Tech (AP-2)

Punter

- Howard McNeill, Tulane (AP-1)
- Joe Downey, Florida State (AP-2)
