= 1978 Tampa Bay Buccaneers season =

NFL team season

- Owner: Hugh Culverhouse
- Head coach: John McKay
- Home stadium: Tampa Stadium

Results
- Record: 5–11
- Division place: 5th NFC Central
- Playoffs: Did not qualify
- All-Pros: DE Lee Roy Selmon
- Pro Bowlers: NT Dave Pear
- Team MVP: LB Dewey Selmon

The 1978 Tampa Bay Buccaneers season was the franchise's third season in the National Football League, the third playing their home games at Tampa Stadium, and the third under head coach John McKay. As their two 1977 victories had been in the last two games of the season, they entered the 1978 season with the longest active winning streak in the NFC Central.

The Buccaneers entered the season with new offensive talent, having selected Doug Williams with the 17th overall pick of the draft. This choice was questioned by many, as there was still an element of society who claimed that a black quarterback was not mentally capable of winning in the NFL, and prejudice is believed to have been a factor in Williams having been drafted as low as seventeenth. According to Buccaneer coach John McKay, "All things being equal, Williams would have gone higher in the draft". Second-year tight end Jimmie Giles, part of the trade that landed Williams, emerged as the Buccaneers’ first receiving threat and still holds several of their scoring records.

== Offseason ==
Offseason coaching changes led to continued accusations of disorganization, as vice-president of operations Ron Wolf resigned, citing only "personal matters". This renewed speculation that head coach John McKay, who replaced Wolf with two of his own longtime assistants, was trying to consolidate front-office power. The coaching staff was reshuffled, with Tom Bass being named defensive coordinator, and offensive coordinator Joe Gibbs hired away from the St. Louis Cardinals. Offensive line coach Jerry Frei left to take the same position with the Chicago Bears.

Tight end Bob Moore was traded, along with a 1979 first-round draft pick, for three-time All-Pro Bears defensive end Wally Chambers. The Buccaneers were widely considered to have given up too much in the trade, as Chambers was coming off of major knee surgery and was considered by many to be "damaged merchandise", and the Buccaneers were left with minimal experience at tight end. The trade was also criticized on the grounds that the Buccaneers did not require Chambers to undergo a team physical, despite his injury history. Council Rudolph, the only player who had started in all 28 of the Buccaneers’ games to date, was made expendable by the trade and was dealt to the Miami Dolphins for a draft pick.

Preseason speculation ran high about what would happen with the Buccaneers’ first overall choice in the draft, with Houston Oilers’ coach Bum Phillips reportedly stating that the Oilers would better any other team's offer to the Buccaneers. Unlike the previous year, when it was made clear early on that Ricky Bell was to be their choice, the Buccaneers kept quiet about who they might draft, further fueling speculation about a trade. The New York Jets were said to have offered their fourth-overall draft pick, plus any player on their roster other than Richard Todd. Tight end was considered to be the Buccaneers’ single greatest need, with Ken MacAfee of Notre Dame often mentioned as a likely draft target. According to Don Shula, "With John McKay's type of offense, an outstanding tight end is absolutely essential. It cannot go without one". This happened to be one of the positions hit hardest by injury in 1977. With most of their mid-round draft picks traded away, the Buccaneers were looking for a trade that would bring them several draft picks. With no teams willing to give up a starting quarterback as part of a deal, the Buccaneers eventually traded the pick to the Oilers, for tight end Jimmie Giles and the Oilers’ first- and second-round picks in 1978, and their third- and fifth-round picks in 1979. Needing a fullback, the Buccaneers shortly afterward traded Anthony Davis to the Oilers for Don Hardeman.

=== NFL draft ===
1978 Tampa Bay Buccaneers draft
Round	Pick	Player	Position	College	Notes
1	17	Doug Williams	QB	Grambling State	from Houston
2	30	Johnny Davis	RB	Alabama	
2	44	Brett Moritz	G	Nebraska	from Houston
6	162	Elijah Marshall	WR	NC State	from Los Angeles
8	196	John McGriff	LB	Miami (FL)	
9	223	Willie Taylor	WR	Pittsburgh	
10	252	Aaron Brown	LB	Ohio State	
12	308	Kevin McLee	RB	Georgia	
Made roster

==== Draft trades ====
The Buccaneers' first overall selection in the 1978 draft was traded to the Houston Oilers in exchange for four draft picks and tight end Jimmie Giles. The Oilers used the pick to select running back Earl Campbell. The Buccaneers’ 3rd-, 4th-, and 6th round picks were traded to the Oakland Raiders for guard Dan Medlin, tackle Jeff Winans, and linebacker Rik Bonness, respectively. Their 5th-round pick was traded to the Miami Dolphins for cornerback Jeris White. The Buccaneers received a 6th-round pick from the Los Angeles Rams for center Dan Ryczek. Their 7th-round pick was traded to the Atlanta Falcons in return for kicker Allan Leavitt. Their 11th-round pick, along with a second 10th-rounder obtained from the Raiders, were traded to the Pittsburgh Steelers in return for defensive tackle Ernie Holmes.

==== Draft selections ====
The Buccaneers had a reduced number of selections in what was considered to have been the weakest draft in a long time. Doug Williams was considered to be the closest thing to a can't-miss quarterback prospect available in the draft. Representatives of several other teams, including Green Bay Packers coach and Pro Football Hall of Fame quarterback Bart Starr, called the Buccaneers to congratulate them on his selection. John McKay, in charge of the draft for the first time, stated that with no outstanding quarterbacks expected to be in the following year's draft, the team had to have Williams. Johnny Davis was a surprise selection, as running back was considered to be one of the team's deepest positions, but Davis was drafted for his blocking ability. McKay pointed out that many of the previous year's quarterback sacks had been the result not of offensive line breakdowns, but of failure of running backs to pick up blitzes. Brett Moritz played half of the 1977 season at Nebraska, after transferring from West Point. He was projected as a backup center. McKay traded a 10th- and an 11th-round pick, players who would not be expected to make the team anyway, to the Pittsburgh Steelers for Ernie Holmes, at one time an important part of the Steelers’ championship defenses. Holmes, who was once involved in a shotgun standoff with police after an incidence of acute paranoid psychosis, was traded for on the understanding that his personal problems were behind him. Steelers coach Chuck Noll called the trade "a gift". The Buccaneers once again passed on offensive linemen, saying that the existing players would improve with more time together, and that the best linemen were all drafted early. The Buccaneers later traded a future draft choice to the Detroit Lions for veteran tackle Rockne Freitas.

== Preseason ==
Doug Williams’ first preseason pass, a 75-yard incompletion that sailed 10 yards past receiver Isaac Hagins, drew a standing ovation from the Tampa Stadium crowd. He was the first quarterback in Buccaneer history capable of throwing long passes downfield. Miami Dolphins nose tackle Randy Crowder, freshly released from federal prison, was signed as a free agent. Ernie Holmes, who was having trouble adjusting to the Buccaneers’ 3–4 defense, was waived to make room for him. A 1979 3rd-round draft pick was sent to the Dolphins as NFL-ordered compensation. Johnny Davis and Jimmy DuBose performed so well in the preseason that newly acquired fullback Don Hardeman was sent to the Baltimore Colts for a future draft pick. Wins in their first three preseason games, combined with the two wins at the end of the previous season, gave the Buccaneers the longest active NFL win streak going into the final preseason game. That game, a loss to the Dolphins, was the first Buccaneers game to sell out.

== Regular season ==
The Buccaneers opened the season, like the other 1976 expansion team the Seattle Seahawks, 200-to-1 longshots to win the Super Bowl; McKay thought that a 9–7 record would be a reasonable goal for the season. The team's regular-season opener against the New York Giants marked the first time that Las Vegas oddsmakers favored the Buccaneers to win, with Jimmy the Greek naming them as 1-point favorites. A pair of mistake-prone early losses left McKay threatening to release players who cause game-losing errors, a change from the earlier attitude of tolerating mistakes from players who were regarded as having potential. With the defense among the best in the league and the offense sparking behind Doug Williams’ leadership, the Buccaneers began to be respected as a competitive NFL team. Coach McKay's respect for Williams was such that he spoke of eventually letting Williams call his own plays in the huddle. McKay's insistence on calling plays from the sideline had been a source of much conflict between McKay and Steve Spurrier during the 1976 season. Williams led the Buccaneers to a 4–4 start before suffering an injury that required his jaw to be wired shut. Even before Williams’ injury, the Buccaneers again found themselves with an injured reserve list in double digits. At midseason, the Buccaneers had 11 players on injured reserve, not counting waived quarterback Mike Boryla. McKay felt that, with a healthy offense, the team would have finished with at least a 10–6 record. Despite a defense that ranked fourth overall in the NFL, the Buccaneers were only able to win one of their remaining eight games behind backup quarterback Mike Rae. McKay summed up the season with the word "frustration". The 9–7 record that he predicted the team would finish with would have been enough to win the NFC Central. Nose tackle Dave Pear became the first Buccaneer selected to the Pro Bowl, finishing third in voting among defensive tackles behind Randy White and Larry Brooks. Linebacker Richard Wood's 168 tackles stood for 14 years as a team record.

== Personnel ==
Tampa Bay Buccaneers 1978 roster
Quarterbacks: 19 Gary Huff; 15 Mike Rae*; 12 Doug Williams*; Running backs: 32 Louis Carter; 38 Johnny Davis*; 41 Dave Farmer; 23 George Ragsdale; 28 Charlie White; Wide receivers: 83 Frank Grant; 89 J. K. McKay*; 87 Larry Mucker; 85 Morris Owens*; Tight ends: 88 Jimmie Giles*; 86 Jim Obradovich	Offensive linemen: 70 Darryl Carlton* T; 74 Rocky Freitas T; 64 Greg Horton* G; 65 Randy Johnson G/C; 68 Dan Medlin G; 72 Garry Puetz* G/T; 75 Dave Reavis* T; 79 Steve Wilson* C; Defensive linemen: 60 Wally Chambers LDE; 71 Randy Crowder NT; 77 Bill Kollar DE; 73 Charley Hannah* LDE; 76 Dave Pear* NT	Linebackers: 53 Rik Bonness OLB; 55 Aaron Brown ILB; 49 Randy Gill ILB; 52 Paul Harris OLB; 59 Earl Inmon OLB; 85 Cecil Johnson* ROLB; 57 Dave Lewis* LOLB; 51 Dana Nafziger OLB; 58 Dewey Selmon* LILB; 54 Richard Wood* RILB; Defensive backs: 34 Cedric Brown* FS; 33 Mark Cotney* SS; 25 Curtis Jordan SS; 46 Danny Reece CB; 40 Mike Washington* CB; 45 Jeris White* CB; Special teams: 4 Dave Green P; 6 Neil O'Donoghue K	Reserve lists: 31 Jerry Anderson S (IR); 42 Ricky Bell* RB (IR); 10 Mike Boryla QB (IR); 66 Booker Brown T (IR); 82 Al Darby TE (IR); 44 Billy Cesare CB (IR); 35 Jimmy DuBose FB (IR); 84 Karl Farmer WR (IR); 80 Larry Franklin WR (IR); 81 Isaac Hagins* WR (IR); 84 Mike Levenseller WR (IR); 14 Randy Hedberg* QB (IR); 67 Brett Moritz C/G (IR); 78 Kurt Schumacher G (IR); 63 Lee Roy Selmon* RDE (IR); 62 Jeff Winans G (IR); rookies in italics starter = *

== Coaching staff ==
Tampa Bay Buccaneers 1978 coaching staff
Front office: Owner – Hugh Culverhouse; General manager – John McKay; Head coaches: Head coach – John McKay; Offensive coaches: Offensive coordinator/running backs – Joe Gibbs; Quarterbacks – Bill Nelsen; Wide receivers – Willie Brown; Offensive line – Skip Husbands	Defensive coaches: Chief assistant/defensive line – Abe Gibron; Defensive coordinator/linebackers – Tom Bass; Defensive backs – Wayne Fontes; Special teams – Phil Krueger

== Schedule ==
Week	Date	Opponent	Result	Record	Venue	Attendance
1	September 2	New York Giants	**L** 13–19	0–1	Tampa Stadium	67,456
2	September 9	**Detroit Lions**	**L** 7–15	0–2	Tampa Stadium	64,443
3	September 17	at **Minnesota Vikings**	**W** 16–10	1–2	Metropolitan Stadium	46,152
4	September 24	Atlanta Falcons	**W** 14–9	2–2	Tampa Stadium	58,073
5	October 1	**Minnesota Vikings**	**L** 7–24	2–3	Tampa Stadium	65,972
6	October 8	at Kansas City Chiefs	**W** 30–13	3–3	Arrowhead Stadium	38,201
7	October 15	at New York Giants	**L** 14–17	3–4	Giants Stadium	68,025
8	October 22	**Chicago Bears**	**W** 33–19	4–4	Tampa Stadium	68,146
9	October 29	at **Green Bay Packers**	**L** 7–9	4–5	Lambeau Field	55,108
10	November 5	at Los Angeles Rams	**L** 23–26	4–6	Los Angeles Memorial Coliseum	55,182
11	November 12	at **Detroit Lions**	**L** 23–34	4–7	Pontiac Silverdome	60,320
12	November 19	Buffalo Bills	**W** 31–10	5–7	Tampa Stadium	61,383
13	November 26	at **Chicago Bears**	**L** 3–14	5–8	Soldier Field	42,373
14	December 3	**Green Bay Packers**	**L** 7–17	5–9	Tampa Stadium	67,754
15	December 10	at San Francisco 49ers	**L** 3–6	5–10	Candlestick Park	30,931
16	December 17	New Orleans Saints	**L** 10–17	5–11	Tampa Stadium	51,207
Note: Intra-division opponents are in **bold** text.

== Standings ==
NFC Central
	W	L	T	PCT	DIV	CONF	PF	PA	STK
^{(3)} Minnesota Vikings	8	7	1	.531	5–2–1	7–4–1	294	306	L2
Green Bay Packers	8	7	1	.531	5–2–1	6–5–1	249	269	L2
Detroit Lions	7	9	0	.438	4–4	5–7	290	300	W2
Chicago Bears	7	9	0	.438	3–5	7–5	253	274	W2
Tampa Bay Buccaneers	5	11	0	.313	2–6	3–11	241	259	L4

== Game summaries ==
=== Week 1: vs New York Giants ===
Week One: New York Giants at Tampa Bay Buccaneers – Game summary

Quarter	1	2	3	4	Total
Giants	7	3	6	3	19
Buccaneers	7	3	0	3	13

at Tampa Stadium, Tampa, Florida

- Date: September 2
- Game time: 8:00 p.m. EDT
- Game weather: 83 °F (28 °C)
- Game attendance: 67,456
- Referee: Don Wedge
- Box score

Game information

First quarter

- NYG – Terry Jackson 32-yard interception return (Joe Danelo kick). Giants 7–0.
- TB – Jimmy DuBose 2-yard run (Neil O'Donoghue kick). Tied 7–7.

Second quarter

- TB – Neil O'Donoghue 34-yard field goal. Buccaneers 10–7.
- NYG – Joe Danelo 42-yard field goal. Tied 10–10.

Third quarter

- NYG – Johnny Perkins 67-yard pass from Joe Pisarcik (kick failed). Giants 16–10.

Fourth quarter

- TB – Neil O'Donoghue 26-yard field goal. Giants 16–13.
- NYG – Joe Danelo 23-yard field goal. Giants 19–13.

Top passers

- NYG – Joe Pisarcik – 9/15, 156 yards, TD, INT
- TB – Gary Huff – 9/22, 84 yards, 2 INT

Top rushers

- NYG – Larry Csonka – 6 rushes, 28 yards
- TB – Rickey Bell – 13 rushes, 54 yards

Top receivers

- NYG – Johnny Perkins – 4 receptions, 110 yards, TD
- TB – Jimmie Giles – 5 receptions, 57 yards

The New York Giants scored ten points off of Buccaneer interceptions en route to an upset victory. The Buccaneers rushed for 165 yards, but were held to field goals on drives deep in Giants territory. Doug Williams suffered a badly bruised shoulder when tackled by Gary Jeter in the first quarter, and was replaced by Gary Huff. Terry Jackson returned Williams’ early interception, called by John McKay a "terrible blunder", for a touchdown. Williams completed only one of six passes before leaving with the injury. The Buccaneers took the lead on a 2-yard Jimmy DuBose touchdown and a Neil O'Donoghue field goal, but Joe Pisarcik's 67-yard pass to Johnny Perkins gave the Giants the lead for good.

=== Week 2: vs Detroit Lions ===
Week Two: Detroit Lions at Tampa Bay Buccaneers – Game summary

Quarter	1	2	3	4	Total
Lions	9	3	0	3	15
Buccaneers	7	0	0	0	7

at Tampa Stadium, Tampa, Florida

- Date: September 9
- Game time: 8:00 p.m. EDT
- Game weather: 83 °F (28 °C)
- Game attendance: 64,443
- Referee: Cal Lepore
- Box score

Game information

First quarter

- TB – Ricky Bell 1-yard run (Neil O'Donoghue kick). Buccaneers 7–0.
- DET – Benny Ricardo 48-yard field goal. Buccaneers 7–3.
- DET – Jesse Thompson 9-yard pass from Greg Landry (kick failed). Lions 9–7.

Second quarter

- DET – Benny Ricardo 47-yard field goal. Lions 12–7.

Third quarter

- No scoring plays

Fourth quarter

- DET – Benny Ricardo 27-yard field goal. Lions 15–7.

Top passers

- DET – Greg Landry – 8/10, 55 yards, TD
- TB – Gary Huff – 4/9, 48 yards, INT

Top rushers

- DET – Dexter Bussey – 21 rushes, 88 yards
- TB – Rickey Bell – 15 rushes, 98 yards, TD

Top receivers

- DET – Jesse Thompson – 3 receptions, 29 yards, TD
- TB – Jimmie Giles – 2 receptions, 37 yards

The Detroit Lions held the Buccaneers to 101 yards of total offense, 56 yards of which came on a first-quarter Ricky Bell run. Bell scored the Buccaneers’ only touchdown on a 1-yard plunge. The Buccaneers were hurt by penalties and turnovers, fumbling four times in the first quarter alone. A Lions drive late in the first half was extended twice by Buc penalties, the first when Curtis Jordan ran into punter Tom Skladany, and the second when Dave Pear's late hit on Lions quarterback Greg Landry knocked Landry out of the game. This penalty nullified a Mike Washington interception, and resulted in one of Benny Ricardo's three field goals. Buc passers were sacked seven times. Mike Boryla started the game for the Buccaneers, but was replaced by Gary Huff. Coming off of the previous season's knee injury, Boryla declared his recovering knee too sore to play on, and went back on injured reserve after the game.

=== Week 3: at Minnesota Vikings ===
Week Three: Tampa Bay Buccaneers at Minnesota Vikings – Game summary

Quarter	1	2	3	4	Total
Buccaneers	3	6	7	0	16
Vikings	7	0	0	3	10

at Metropolitan Stadium, Bloomington, Minnesota

- Date: September 17
- Game time: 2:00 p.m. EDT / 1:00 p.m. CDT
- Game weather: 59 °F (15 °C)
- Game attendance: 46,152
- Referee: Ben Dreith
- Box score

Game information

First quarter

- TB – Neil O'Donoghue 42-yard field goal. Buccaneers 3–0.
- MIN – Ahmad Rashad 4-yard pass from Fran Tarkenton (Rick Danmeier kick). Vikings 7–3.

Second quarter

- TB – Ricky Bell 2-yard run (kick failed). Buccaneers 9–7.

Third quarter

- TB – Morris Owens 5-yard pass from Doug Williams (Neil O'Donoghue kick). Buccaneers 16–7.

Fourth quarter

- MIN – Rick Danmeier 47-yard field goal. Buccaneers 16–10.

Top passers

- TB – Doug Williams – 5/19, 63 yards, TD
- MIN – Fran Tarkenton – 23/31, 180 yards, TD, 2 INT

Top rushers

- TB – Ricky Bell – 21 rushes, 59 yards, TD
- MIN – Chuck Foreman – 12 rushes, 25 yards

Top receivers

- TB – Morris Owens – 4 receptions, 42 yards, TD
- MIN – Sammy White – 4 receptions, 62 yards

The Buccaneers took advantage of Minnesota Vikings mistakes to get an upset and their first win of the season. The Buccaneers scored on a 5-yard pass from Doug Williams to Morris Owens, after a live ball that had hit a Viking on a punt return was recovered by Billy Cesare on the Vikings’ 5-yard line. Vikings coach Bud Grant later claimed that returner Kevin Miller never touched the ball, and blamed the loss on the officials. Fran Tarkenton completed 23 of 31 passes for 180 yards, but threw two interceptions and was replaced by Tommy Kramer in the final two minutes. Kramer promptly threw an interception to Cecil Johnson. Tarkenton also hit Ahmad Rashad for a 4-yard touchdown to finish a 63-yard first-quarter drive. Later, Jeris White's interception of a Tarkenton pass would lead to a 2-yard Ricky Bell touchdown run. The Buccaneers’ defense, still steamed over Tarkenton's comments two years earlier that the Buccaneers would be his preferred AFC opponent in the Super Bowl, held the Vikings to 73 yards rushing and sacked Tarkenton four times. They also came through big by holding the Vikings to a field goal, following a bizarre play in which the Vikings recovered a live ball on a failed field goal attempt and returned it for 80 yards. Grant called the game a defensive contest, saying that there were no good offensive plays in the entire match. John McKay said that "when we shut off their running game, we knew we were in the game and could get 'em", and that the Buccaneers should have a 3–0 record. The game left the two teams tied with 1–2 records.

=== Week 4: vs Atlanta Falcons ===
Week Four: Atlanta Falcons at Tampa Bay Buccaneers – Game summary

Quarter	1	2	3	4	Total
Falcons	2	0	7	0	9
Buccaneers	7	0	0	7	14

at Tampa Stadium, Tampa, Florida

- Date: September 24
- Game time: 4:00 p.m. EDT
- Game weather: 78 °F (26 °C)
- Game attendance: 58,073
- Referee: Gordon McCarter
- Box score

Game information

First quarter

- ATL – Punt blocked out of end zone. Falcons 2–0.
- TB – Mike Washington 79-yard blocked field goal return (Neil O'Donoghue kick). Buccaneers 7–2.

Second quarter

- No scoring plays

Third quarter

- ATL – Alfred Jackson 5-yard pass from Steve Bartkowski (Fred Steinfort kick). Falcons 9–7.

Fourth quarter

- TB – Jim Obradovich 15-yard pass from Doug Williams (Neil O'Donoghue kick). Buccaneers 14–9.

Top passers

- ATL – Steve Bartkowski – 12/24, 81 yards, TD, 3 INT
- TB – Doug Williams – 6/23, 74 yards, TD

Top rushers

- ATL – Haskel Stanback – 23 rushes, 112 yards
- TB – Jimmy DuBose – 11 rushes, 50 yards

Top receivers

- ATL – Bubba Bean – 4 receptions, 23 yards
- TB – Isaac Hagins – 4 receptions, 45 yards

The Atlanta Falcons, who in 1977 had set an NFL record for fewest points allowed, held the Buccaneers to no first downs and one pass completion in the first half. The Falcons were caught sitting on a 2-point lead when the Buccaneers put together a 57-yard fourth-quarter drive, capped by a touchdown pass from Doug Williams to Jim Obradovich, to win the game. Mike Washington scored early on a 79-yard return of a blocked field goal, still (as of 2009) a Tampa Bay record. The Buccaneers missed two later touchdown opportunities on dropped passes by Isaac Hagins. Jimmy DuBose carried four times for 21 yards on the game-winning drive. Mike Washington scored on a blocked field goal, and a Ricky Bell fumble led to Steve Bartkowski's 5-yard pass to Al Jackson. The Buccaneers ran out the clock by holding the ball for the final five minutes of the game, something coach McKay didn't think the team would be able to do against the Atlanta defense. The entire game was played in a driving rainstorm, with wind gusts of up to 40 miles per hour (64 km/h; 35 kn). Hagins later underwent x-rays that revealed that he suffered a fractured vertebra during the game. He was placed on injured reserve, and Larry Franklin was signed to fill his roster spot.

=== Week 5: vs Minnesota Vikings ===
Week Five: Minnesota Vikings at Tampa Bay Buccaneers – Game summary

Quarter	1	2	3	4	Total
Vikings	7	10	0	7	24
Buccaneers	0	7	0	0	7

at Tampa Stadium, Tampa, Florida

- Date: October 1
- Game time: 1:00 p.m. EDT
- Game weather: 78 °F (26 °C)
- Game attendance: 65,972
- Referee: Dick Jorgensen
- Box score

Game information

First quarter

- MIN – Robert Miller 1-yard run (Rick Danmeier kick). Vikings 7–0.

Second quarter

- MIN – Rick Danmeier 36-yard field goal. Vikings 10–0.
- TB – Morris Owens 56-yard pass from Doug Williams (Neil O'Donoghue kick). Vikings 10–7.
- MIN – Sammy White 21-yard pass from Fran Tarkenton (Rick Danmeier kick). Vikings 17–7.

Third quarter

- No scoring plays

Fourth quarter

- MIN – Fred McNeill 16-yard blocked punt return (Rick Danmeier kick). Vikings 24–7.

Top passers

- MIN – Fran Tarkenton – 20/31, 213 yards, TD, INT
- TB – Doug Williams – 16/35, 311 yards, TD, 3 INT

Top rushers

- MIN – Robert Miller – 13 rushes, 38 yards, TD
- TB – Jimmy DuBose – 10 rushes, 35 yards

Top receivers

- MIN – Ahmad Rashad – 5 receptions, 60 yards
- TB – Morris Owens – 5 receptions, 132 yards, TD

Vikings quarterback Fran Tarkenton completed 20 of 31 passes for 213 yards. He passed for a touchdown to Sammy White, and set up a rushing touchdown by Robert Miller. Doug Williams completed a Buccaneer-record 16 of 35 passes for 311 yards, including a 56-yard touchdown to Morris Owens. Alan Page blocked a Dave Green punt that was returned for the final touchdown. The Vikings also blocked an earlier field goal attempt, described by John McKay as looking like "The ball was snapped like a dying quail and about 25 men came through to block it". As opposed to the previous meeting, the Vikings played error-free football.

=== Week 6: at Kansas City Chiefs ===
Week Six: Tampa Bay Buccaneers at Kansas City Chiefs – Game summary

Quarter	1	2	3	4	Total
Buccaneers	0	10	0	20	30
Chiefs	3	0	0	10	13

at Arrowhead Stadium, Kansas City, Missouri

- Date: October 8
- Game time: 2:00 p.m. EDT / 1:00 p.m. CDT
- Game weather: 54 °F (12 °C)
- Game attendance: 38,201
- Referee: Gene Barth
- TV announcers (CBS): Jim Thacker and Roman Gabriel
- Box score

Game information

First quarter

- KC – Jan Stenerud 25-yard field goal. Chiefs 3–0.

Second quarter

- TB – Neil O'Donoghue 22-yard field goal. Tied 3–3.
- TB – Morris Owens 10-yard pass from Doug Williams (Neil O'Donoghue kick). Buccaneers 10–3.

Third quarter

- No scoring plays

Fourth quarter

- KC – Jan Stenerud 30-yard field goal. Buccaneers 10–6.
- TB – Jimmy DuBose 1-yard run (kick failed). Buccaneers 16–6.
- TB – Louis Carter 3-yard run (Neil O'Donoghue kick). Buccaneers 23–6.
- KC – Henry Marshall 26-yard pass from Tony Adams (Jan Stenerud kick). Buccaneers 23–13.
- TB – Jimmy DuBose 1-yard run (Neil O'Donoghue kick). Buccaneers 30–13.

Top passers

- TB – Doug Williams – 14/23, 226 yards, TD
- KC – Tony Adams – 15/28, 136 yards, TD, 2 INT

Top rushers

- TB – Jimmy DuBose – 21 rushes, 75 yards, 2 TD
- KC – Tony Reed – 12 rushes, 42 yards

'Top receivers

- TB – Larry Mucker – 3 receptions, 81 yards
- KC – Henry Marshall – 5 receptions, 89 yards, TD

The Buccaneers, playing with the goal of keeping the Kansas City Chiefs’ Wing-T offense on the bench as much as possible, held them to little more than half of their regular rushing average. Meanwhile, the Buccaneers’ offense had their most productive day ever, setting a team record with three fourth-quarter touchdowns. Jimmy DuBose ran for two touchdowns and Louis Carter for one, and Doug Williams threw a 10-yard touchdown pass to Morris Owens. Kansas City was held to a pair of Jan Stenerud field goals for most of the game. A fourth-quarter Tony Adams pass was ruled a touchdown, although replays showed that receiver Henry Marshall failed to keep both of his feet inbounds. Richard Wood was given much of the credit for stifling the Chiefs’ league-leading rushing attack. Wood correctly expected that Chiefs offensive coordinator Tom Pagna would run the offense straight at him, as he did when Wood played at USC and Pagna coached at Notre Dame. Pagna assumed incorrectly that the undersized Wood would be overpowered, but Wood instead responded by making 12 tackles. This was the Buccaneers’ third consecutive road win, and came one day after the Kansas City Royals were eliminated from the American League pennant race.

=== Week 7: at New York Giants ===
Week Seven: Tampa Bay Buccaneers at New York Giants – Game summary

Quarter	1	2	3	4	Total
Buccaneers	0	14	0	0	14
Giants	3	0	0	14	17

at Giants Stadium, East Rutherford, New Jersey

- Date: October 15
- Game time: 1:00 p.m. EDT
- Game weather: 49 °F (9 °C)
- Game attendance: 68,025
- Referee: Jerry Markbreit
- Box score

Game information

First quarter

- NYG – Joe Danelo 22-yard field goal. Giants 3–0.

Second quarter

- TB – Johnny Davis 3-yard run (Neil O'Donoghue kick). Buccaneers 7–3.
- TN – Jimmy DuBose 1-yard run (Neil O'Donoghue kick). Buccaneers 14–3.

Third quarter

- No scoring plays

Fourth quarter

- NYG – Larry Csonka 7-yard run (Joe Danelo kick). Buccaneers 14–10.
- NYG – Larry Csonka 1-yard run (Joe Danelo kick). Giants 17–14.

Top passers

- TB – Doug Williams – 7/27, 100 yards, 2 INT
- NYG – Joe Pisarcik – 4/13, 45 yards, 2 INT

Top rushers

- TB – Jimmy DuBose – 24 rushes, 109 yards, TD
- NYG – Bobby Hammond – 15 rushes, 63 yards

Top receivers

- TB – Jim Obradovich – 3 receptions, 45 yards
- NYG – James Thompson – 2 receptions, 32 yards

The New York Giants capitalized on two late turnovers to come from behind for the win. Giants linebacker Harry Carson intercepted a Doug Williams pass, then recovered a Louis Carter fumble. Both turnovers led to touchdown runs by Larry Csonka. Neil O'Donoghue missed on a last-minute 42-yard field goal attempt into strong winds. Doug Williams was 7-for-27 passing, with two interceptions. The second of these interceptions proved very costly, as Jimmy DuBose suffered what turned out to be a career-ending knee injury while trying to make a tackle on the return. This occurred only four plays after DuBose's 109 yards rushing made him the first Buccaneer rusher to pass the 100-yard mark in a game. Jerry Golsteyn replaced Joe Pisarcik at quarterback for the Giants, and led both of the fourth-quarter winning drives.

=== Week 8: vs Chicago Bears ===
Week Eight: Chicago Bears at Tampa Bay Buccaneers – Game summary

Quarter	1	2	3	4	Total
Bears	0	10	6	3	19
Buccaneers	6	7	6	14	33

at Tampa Stadium, Tampa, Florida

- Date: October 22
- Game time: 1:00 p.m. EDT
- Game weather: 74 °F (23 °C)
- Game attendance: 68,146
- Referee: Fred Wyant
- Box score

Game information

First quarter

- TB – Ricky Bell 1-yard run (kick failed). Buccaneers 6–0.

Second quarter

- CHI – James Scott 34-yard pass from Bob Avellini (Bob Thomas kick). Bears 7–6.
- TB – Jim Obradovich 28-yard pass from Doug Williams (Neil O'Donoghue kick). Buccaneers 13–7.
- CHI – Bob Thomas 21-yard field goal. Buccaneers 13–10.

Third quarter

- CHI – Roland Harper 2-yard run (kick failed). Bears 16–13.
- TB – Doug Williams 1-yard run (kick failed). Buccaneers 19–16.

Fourth quarter

- TB – Morris Owens 40-yard pass from Doug Williams (Neil O'Donoghue kick). Buccaneers 26–16.
- CHI – Bob Thomas 27-yard field goal. Buccaneers 26–19.
- TB – Johnny Davis 3-yard run (Neil O'Donoghue kick). Buccaneers 33–19.

Top passers

- CHI – Bob Avellini – 15/29, 218 yards, TD, 3 INT
- TB – Doug Williams – 11/19, 180 yards, 2 TD, INT

Top rushers

- CHI – Roland Harper – 10 rushes, 65 yards, TD
- TB – Ricky Bell – 27 rushes, 95 yards, TD

Top receivers

- CHI – James Scott – 5 receptions, 105 yards, TD
- TB – Morris Owens – 4 receptions, 82 yards, TD

The Chicago Bears expected to face the mistake-prone Buccaneer team they had seen in game films, but were instead confronted with an efficient team that controlled the ball and took advantage of Bears mistakes. Doug Williams threw touchdown passes to Jim Obradovich and Morris Owens, and unexpectedly ran for some key first downs. Gary Fencik intercepted him at the goal line on one drive, but the Bears failed to gain a first down on the ensuing possession. Ricky Bell, until recently seeing primary duty blocking for Jimmy DuBose, returned to his lead runner spot and gained 95 yards on 28 carries. He was awarded a game ball for his effort. Dave Lewis intercepted Bob Avellini twice in the final two minutes, and the Buccaneers’ defense held Walter Payton to a season-low 34 yards rushing in the Bears’ fifth consecutive loss. The Buccaneers made several changes in starting lineup going into the game: Wally Chambers made his first start of the year, Johnny Davis replaced the injured DuBose at fullback, and recently acquired Frank Grant got the start at wide receiver.

=== Week 9: at Green Bay Packers ===
Week Nine: Tampa Bay Buccaneers at Green Bay Packers – Game summary

Quarter	1	2	3	4	Total
Buccaneers	0	0	7	0	7
Packers	6	0	0	3	9

at Lambeau Field, Green Bay, Wisconsin

- Date: October 29
- Game time: 2:00 p.m. EST / 1:00 p.m. CST
- Game weather: 40 °F (4 °C)
- Game attendance: 55,108
- Referee: Fred Silva
- Box score

Game information

First quarter

- GB – Terdell Middleton 2-yard run (kick failed). Packers 6–0.

Second quarter

- No scoring plays

Third quarter

- TB – Ricky Bell 1-yard run (Neil O'Donoghue kick). Buccaneers 7–6.

Fourth quarter

- GB – Chester Marcol 48-yard field goal. Packers 9–7.

Top passers

- TB – Doug Williams – 5/17, 98 yards, INT
- GB – David Whitehurst – 16/31, 173 yards, 2 INT

Top rushers

- TB – Ricky Bell – 20 rushes, 30 yards, TD
- GB – Terdell Middleton – 20 rushes, 37 yards, TD

Top receivers

- TB – Morris Owens – 1 reception, 53 yards
- GB – Aundra Thompson – 3 receptions, 47 yards

The Green Bay Packers held the Buccaneers without a first down or completed pass for the first 37 minutes of the game. The Buccaneers took the lead on a 2-yard Ricky Bell run that was set up by a Morris Owens reception of a 53-yard Doug Williams pass. Chester Marcol kicked the game-winning field goal. Neil O'Donoghue missed two field goals in the contest. Williams’ final pass was intercepted by Willie Buchanon. The Buccaneers shut down running back Terdell Middleton and knocked quarterback David Whitehurst dizzy, but Whitehurst returned to lead the game-winning 50-yard drive. Tampa Bay's uncharacteristic move to a man-to-man defense left Steve Odom open to catch Whitehurst's 18-yard pass on a fourth down during that drive.

=== Week 10: at Los Angeles Rams ===
Week Ten: Tampa Bay Buccaneers at Los Angeles Rams – Game summary

Quarter	1	2	3	4	Total
Buccaneers	0	6	3	14	23
Rams	3	14	3	6	26

at Los Angeles Memorial Coliseum, Los Angeles, California

- Date: November 5
- Game time: 4:00 p.m. EST / 1:00 p.m. PST
- Game weather: 64 °F (18 °C)
- Game attendance: 55,182
- Referee: Jim Tunney
- Box score

Game information

First quarter

- LA – Frank Corral 29-yard field goal. Rams 3–0.

Second quarter

- LA – Nolan Cromwell 16-yard run (Frank Corral kick). Rams 10–0.
- TB – Neil O'Donoghue 42-yard field goal. Rams 10–3.
- LA – Billy Waddy 68-yard pass from Pat Haden (Frank Corral kick). Rams 17–3.
- TB – Neil O'Donoghue 25-yard field goal. Rams 17–6.

Third quarter

- TB – Neil O'Donoghue 30-yard field goal. Rams 17–9.
- LA – Frank Corral 27-yard field goal. Rams 20–9.

Fourth quarter

- TB – Ricky Bell 1-yard run (Neil O'Donoghue kick). Rams 20–16.
- LA – Frank Corral 32-yard field goal. Rams 23–16.
- TB – J. K. McKay 23-yard pass from Mike Rae (Neil O'Donoghue kick). Tied 23–23.
- LA – Frank Corral 27-yard field goal. Rams 26–23.

Top passers

- TB – Mike Rae – 9/17, 123 yards, TD, 3 INT
- LA – Pat Haden – 15/27, 233 yards, TD

Top rushers

- TB – Ricky Bell – 21 rushes, 104 yards, TD
- LA – John Cappelletti – 9 rushes, 48 yards

Top receivers

- TB – Morris Owens – 1 reception, 66 yards
- LA – Willie Miller – 6 receptions, 105 yards

Three Buccaneer starters went out with injuries, most significantly Doug Williams, who suffered a broken jaw on a Jack Youngblood blitz. Darryl Carlton separated a shoulder, and Dewey Selmon broke his wrist. Mike Rae played in relief of Williams, completing 9 of 17 passes for 123 yards and a touchdown. The Rams double-covered both Buccaneer receivers, leaving no coverage to prevent Rae from rushing for 95 yards on four carries. Ricky Bell had his first 100-yard rushing day, with 21 carries for 104 yards. The Buccaneers set several team records in this game: 209 yards was their highest rushing total yet, Bell's 555 yards were a Buccaneer single-season rushing record, and Neil O'Donoghue's 38 points were a new season scoring record. Although the Rams were not on McKay's list of 18 teams that he felt the Buccaneers were competitive with, Tampa Bay rallied to a 23–23 fourth-quarter tie before losing on a late Frank Corral field goal. It was the Buccaneers’ third fourth-quarter collapse in four weeks. The Buccaneers’ performance drew cheers from the Los Angeles crowd, among whom McKay was still a popular figure.

=== Week 11: at Detroit Lions ===
Week Eleven: Tampa Bay Buccaneers at Detroit Lions – Game summary

Quarter	1	2	3	4	Total
Buccaneers	0	13	0	10	23
Lions	7	14	7	6	34

at Pontiac Silverdome, Pontiac, Michigan

- Date: November 12
- Game time: 2:00 p.m. EST
- Game weather: None (played indoors)
- Game attendance: 60,320
- Referee: Gordon McCarter
- Box score

Game information

First quarter

- DET – David Hill 2-yard pass from Gary Danielson (Benny Ricardo kick). Lions 7–0.

Second quarter

- TB – Jim Obradovich 12-yard pass from Mike Rae (Neil O'Donoghue kick). Tied 7–7.
- TB – Neil O'Donoghue 27-yard field goal. Buccaneers 10–7.
- DET – Horace King 75-yard run (Benny Ricardo kick). Lions 14–10.
- TB – Neil O'Donoghue 45-yard field goal. Lions 14–13.
- DET – David Hill 14-yard pass from Gary Danielson (Benny Ricardo kick). Lions 21–13.

Third quarter

- DET – Dexter Bussey 1-yard run (Benny Ricardo kick). Lions 28–13.

Fourth quarter

- DET – Benny Ricardo 38-yard field goal. Lions 31–13.
- TB – Neil O'Donoghue 28-yard field goal. Lions 31–16.
- DET – Benny Ricardo 28-yard field goal. Lions 34–16.
- TB – George Ragsdale 31-yard pass from Gary Huff (Neil O'Donoghue kick). Lions 34–23.

Top passers

- TB – Mike Rae – 10/17, 89 yards, TD
- DET – Gary Danielson – 15/24, 206 yards, 2 TD, INT

Top rushers

- TB – Ricky Bell – 18 rushes, 70 yards
- DET – Horace King – 12 rushes, 104 yards, TD

Top receivers

- TB – George Ragsdale – 1 reception, 31 yards, TD
- DET – David Hill – 7 receptions, 106 yards, 2 TD

The Detroit Lions gained 404 yards in the Buccaneers’ worst defensive performance since 1976. Horace King became only the third running back in two seasons to gain 100 yards against the Buccaneers. Three defenders missed tackles on his 75-yard touchdown run. Gary Danielson completed 15 of 24 passes for 206 yards and two touchdowns, both to David Hill. John McKay blamed the poor performance on mental errors, such as three defenders covering one receiver while the other remained open. The Lions also took advantage of the inexperience of middle linebacker Rik Bonness, who was playing at the unfamiliar outside linebacker position due to injuries to Cecil Johnson and Dana Nafziger. The depletion of the linebacker corps required a shift to a 4–3 defense, which the players had difficulty adjusting to. McKay said, "If I had a gun, I would have shot our guys", of all the receivers left open. Buccaneers quarterbacks were sacked eight times, five times by Bubba Baker. The Buccaneers scored on touchdown passes from Mike Rae to Jim Obradovich and from Gary Huff to George Ragsdale. Neil O'Donoghue kicked three field goals, including a club-record 49-yarder. The loss left the Buccaneers and Lions tied for last place in the NFC Central.

=== Week 12: vs Buffalo Bills ===
Week Twelve: Buffalo Bills at Tampa Bay Buccaneers – Game summary

Quarter	1	2	3	4	Total
Bills	0	0	3	7	10
Buccaneers	7	3	7	14	31

at Tampa Stadium, Tampa, Florida

- Date: November 19
- Game time: 1:00 p.m. EST
- Game weather: 72 °F (22 °C)
- Game attendance: 61,383
- Referee: Jerry Markbreit
- Box score

Game information

First quarter

- TB – Ricky Bell 12-yard run (Neil O'Donoghue kick). Buccaneers 7–0.

Second quarter

- TB – Neil O'Donoghue 28-yard field goal. Buccaneers 10–0.

Third quarter

- TB – Morris Owens 22-yard pass from Mike Rae (Neil O'Donoghue kick). Buccaneers 17–0.
- BUF – Tom Dempsey 37-yard field goal. Buccaneers 17–3.

Fourth quarter

- TB – Jimmie Giles 33-yard pass from Mike Rae (Neil O'Donoghue kick). Buccaneers 24–3.
- TB – Johnny Davis 3-yard run (Neil O'Donoghue kick). Buccaneers 31–3.
- BUF – Bob Chandler 9-yard pass from Bill Munson (Tom Dempsey kick). Buccaneers 31–10.

Top passers

- BUF – Bill Munson – 12/22, 112 yards, TD, 2 INT
- TB – Mike Rae – 7/14, 121 yards, 2 TD, INT

Top rushers

- BUF – Curtis Brown – 14 rushes, 44 yards
- TB – Johnny Davis – 18 rushes, 73 yards, TD

Top receivers

- BUF – Bob Chandler – 6 receptions, 60 yards, TD
- TB – Morris Owens – 3 receptions, 50 yards, TD

Following two subpar defensive performances, the Buccaneers held the Bills without a touchdown until the fourth quarter, when the Buccaneers already had a 31–3 lead. Buc defenders cheered a return to their regular 3–4 alignment. Johnny Davis gained 78 yards on 18 carries after a Bills player fell on Ricky Bell's knee. The injury to Bell, combined with the earlier injuries to Doug Williams and Jimmy DuBose, left the Buccaneers without their entire starting backfield. Buccaneers running backs nevertheless combined for 204 yards. Bell and Davis ran for a touchdown each. Mike Rae threw two touchdown passes; one to Morris Owens, and another to Jimmie Giles for the first of Giles’ career.

=== Week 13: at Chicago Bears ===
Week Thirteen: Tampa Bay Buccaneers at Chicago Bears – Game summary

Quarter	1	2	3	4	Total
Buccaneers	0	3	0	0	3
Bears	0	0	7	7	14

at Soldier Field, Chicago, Illinois

- Date: November 26
- Game time: 2:00 p.m. EST / 1:00 p.m. CST
- Game weather: 35 °F (2 °C)
- Game attendance: 42,373
- Referee: Don Wedge
- Box score

Game information

First quarter

- No scoring plays

Second quarter

- TB – Neil O'Donoghue 44-yard field goal. Buccaneers 3–0.

Third quarter

- CHI – Walter Payton 3-yard run (Bob Thomas kick). Bears 7–3.

Fourth quarter

- CHI – Bob Avellini 3-yard run (Bob Thomas kick). Bears 14–3.

Top passers

- TB – Mike Rae – 4/12, 54 yards
- CHI – Bob Avellini – 4/6, 62 yards, INT

Top rushers

- TB – Louis Carter – 12 rushes, 56 yards
- CHI – Roland Harper – 25 rushes, 144 yards

Top receivers

- TB – Frank Grant – 1 reception, 19 yards
- CHI – Walter Payton – 2 receptions, 26 yards

The Bears held the Buccaneers to a season-low 92 yards of total offense. Tampa Bay repeatedly failed to score, despite getting the ball with good field position. Mike Rae was sacked seven times in his first 11 pass attempts. The Bears controlled the ball for 22:26 of the second half, consistently breaking Walter Payton and Roland Harper for short gains. Payton finished the day with 105 yards rushing and Harper 144, the first time the Buccaneers had allowed two 100-yard rushers in a single game. It was only the second time in history that the Bears had two backs each rush for 100 yards. McKay declined to give the Bears much credit, saying that "they had a lot of success running and holding at the same time".

=== Week 14: vs Green Bay Packers ===
Week Fourteen: Green Bay Packers at Tampa Bay Buccaneers – Game summary

Quarter	1	2	3	4	Total
Packers	10	7	0	0	17
Buccaneers	0	7	0	0	7

at Tampa Stadium, Tampa, Florida

- Date: December 3
- Game time: 1:00 p.m. EST
- Game weather: 76 °F (24 °C)
- Game attendance: 67,754
- Referee: Chuck Heberling
- Box score

Game information

First quarter

- GB – James Lofton 10-yard pass from David Whitehurst (Chester Marcol kick). Packers 7–0.
- GB – Chester Marcol 27-yard field goal. Packers 10–0.

Second quarter

- TB – George Ragsdale 14-yard run (Neil O'Donoghue kick). Packers 10–7.
- GB – Barty Smith 1-yard run (Chester Marcol kick). Packers 17–7.

Third quarter

- No scoring plays

Fourth quarter

- No scoring plays

Top passers

- GB – David Whitehurst – 13/19, 113 yards, TD, INT
- TB – Mike Rae – 14/31, 178 yards, 2 INT

Top rushers

- GB – Terdell Middleton – 12 rushes, 30 yards
- TB – George Ragsdale – 12 rushes, 70 yards, TD

Top receivers

- GB – James Lofton – 3 receptions, 39 yards, TD
- TB – Morris Owens – 3 receptions, 38 yards

Again playing without their entire starting backfield, the Buccaneers outgained Green Bay in several major offensive statistics, including a 321–173 yardage advantage, but were outscored by the Packers. A knee injury to Lee Roy Selmon meant that all three of their players selected with first-round draft picks were out with injuries. George Ragsdale, Johnny Davis, Jim Obradovich, Neil O'Donoghue, and Danny Reece were also injured during the game, which left the Buccaneers with only three running backs on the roster. The Buccaneers finished the game with only 37 healthy players, eight under the NFL roster limit. The 173 yards allowed was one of several team records set during the game, and the season total to date of 228 points equaled the team's total scoring of the first two seasons combined. Ragsdale's 14-yard touchdown run was their longest touchdown run of the year. Ragsdale, having been knocked cold, was unable to hear the crowd's applause. The Packers scored on a 10-yard David Whitehurst pass to James Lofton, a 27-yard Chester Marcol field goal, and a 1-yard Barty Smith run. The win broke the Packers’ four-game losing streak.

=== Week 15: at San Francisco 49ers ===
Week Fifteen: Tampa Bay Buccaneers at San Francisco 49ers – Game summary

Quarter	1	2	3	4	Total
Buccaneers	0	3	0	0	3
49ers	0	3	0	3	6

at Candlestick Park, San Francisco, California

- Date: December 10
- Game time: 4:00 p.m. EST / 1:00 p.m. PST
- Game weather: 44 °F (7 °C)
- Game attendance: 30,931
- Referee: Bob Frederic
- Box score

Game information

First quarter

- No scoring plays

Second quarter

- SF – Ray Wersching 28-yard field goal. 49ers 3–0.
- TB – Dave Green 35-yard field goal. Tied 3–3.

Third quarter

- No scoring plays

Fourth quarter

- SF – Ray Wersching 30-yard field goal. 49ers 6–3.

Top passers

- TB – Mike Rae – 13/27, 140 yards, INT
- SF – Scott Bull – 10/17, 98 yards, 2 INT

Top rushers

- TB – Louis Carter – 15 rushes, 60 yards
- SF – Paul Hofer – 17 rushes, 56 yards

Top receivers

- TB – Frank Grant – 3 receptions, 47 yards
- SF – Kenny Harrison – 6 receptions, 78 yards

In a meeting between the NFL's two worst offenses, the San Francisco 49ers’ Ray Wersching kicked a fourth-quarter field goal to win the first game in which the Buccaneer defense held their opposition without a touchdown. The Buccaneers committed ten fumbles, were intercepted five times, allowed eleven sacks, and scored no touchdowns. McKay was so upset that he cancelled his regular press conference the Monday following the game, and indicated that he would not be present at his Friday press conference. The 49ers fumbled six times, were intercepted twice, and allowed five sacks. Mark Cotney's 28-yard interception return set up Tampa Bay's only score, a 35-yard Dave Green field goal. The previous week's injury to Neil O'Donoghue became an issue, as Green's limited range prevented the Buccaneers from attempting potential game-winning or -tying field goals. Bill Kollar started and led the team in tackles for the second week in a row. The boredom of the game was such that one of the coaches spoke of setting himself on fire on the sideline, prompting a Buccaneer publicist to request that the team band be ready to play "You Light Up My Life".

=== Week 16: vs New Orleans Saints ===
Week Sixteen: New Orleans Saints at Tampa Bay Buccaneers – Game summary

Quarter	1	2	3	4	Total
Saints	3	0	7	7	17
Buccaneers	3	0	0	7	10

at Tampa Stadium, Tampa, Florida

- Date: December 17
- Game time: 1:00 p.m. EST
- Game weather: 65 °F (18 °C)
- Game attendance: 51,207
- Referee: Gordon McCarter
- Box score

Game information

First quarter

- NO – Steve Mike-Mayer 32-yard field goal. Saints 3–0.
- TB – Neil O'Donoghue 47-yard field goal. Tied 3–3.

Second quarter

- No scoring plays

Third quarter

- NO – Chuck Muncie 21-yard run (Steve Mike-Mayer kick). Saints 10–3.

Fourth quarter

- TB – Jimmie Giles 2-yard pass from Doug Williams (Neil O'Donoghue kick). Tied 10–10.
- NO – Henry Childs 1-yard pass from Archie Manning (Steve Mike-Mayer kick). Saints 17–10.

Top passers

- NO – Archie Manning – 25/36, 250 yards, TD, 2 INT
- TB – Doug Williams – 7/22, 96 yards, TD

Top rushers

- NO – Chuck Muncie – 11 rushes, 68 yards, TD
- TB – Johnny Davis – 9 rushes, 44 yards

Top receivers

- NO – Henry Childs – 6 receptions, 80 yards, TD
- TB – Larry Mucker – 2 receptions, 56 yards

New Orleans Saints quarterback Archie Manning completed 25 of 36 passes for 250 yards, the most passing yards yet allowed by the Buccaneers, and a touchdown to Henry Childs. Chuck Muncie broke four tackles while scoring on a 21-yard run. The Buccaneer defense played uncharacteristically poorly, allowing 421 yards of offense. Special teams also broke down on several occasions. McKay called it the worst game the team had yet played, and promised that changes would be made. Buccaneer receivers blamed lack of concentration for missed routes and dropped balls. Doug Williams returned to the starting lineup, but Tampa Bay was able to control the ball for only 19 of the game's 60 minutes. Williams, playing with his jaw still wired shut, threw a 2-yard fourth-down pass to Jimmie Giles for the Buccaneers’ only touchdown.

== Awards and records ==
- Lee Roy Selmon, Second Team Associated Press and Newspaper Enterprise Association All-Pro selection
- Dave Pear, Pro Bowl
- Doug Williams, UPI All-Rookie Quarterback
- The 1,895 passing yards allowed are the lowest in team history. The 337 passing attempts and 190 completions allowed are the second-lowest.
- Dave Green's 100 punts are the most in team history.
- The defense forced 43 turnovers, surpassed only by the 1981 team's 46. Their 29 interceptions was also surpassed in 1981, but remains their third-best total.
