= Frank Marion =

Frank Marion may refer to:

- Frank J. Marion (1870–1963), American motion picture pioneer
- Frank Marion (American football) (born 1951), American football player
