= Eddie Hicks =

American football player (born 1955)

No. 29
- Position: Running back

Personal information
- Born: July 26, 1955 (age 71); Henderson, North Carolina, U.S.
- Listed height: 6 ft 2 in (1.88 m)
- Listed weight: 210 lb (95 kg)

Career information
- High school: Northern Vance (Henderson)
- College: East Carolina (1975–1978)
- NFL draft: 1979: 6th round, 158th overall pick

Career history
- New York Giants (1979–1980)

Awards and highlights
- ECU Athletics Hall of Fame

Career NFL statistics
- Games played: 17
- Rushing attempts: 19
- Rushing yards: 50
- Rushing average: 2.6
- Rushing touchdowns: 0
- Stats at Pro Football Reference

Edward James Hicks (July 26, 1955 - October 31, 2022) was an American former professional football player who was a running back for two seasons with the New York Giants of the National Football League (NFL). He played college football for the East Carolina Pirates.

== College career ==
Hicks played four seasons at East Carolina University, rushing for 2,101 yards and scoring 23 rushing touchdowns.

== Professional career ==
Hicks was selected in the sixth round with the 158th overall pick in the 1979 NFL draft by the New York Giants. In his first season, he did not start any games. He was a starter in the first game of his second season on September 9, 1980, against the St. Louis Cardinals due to Billy Taylor being injured. He rushed for 39 yards on 15 attempts and New York won 41–35. He played two more NFL games that season before being released, finishing with 50 rushing yards on 19 attempts. In February 1981, he signed with the Philadelphia Eagles, but was released in July.

== NFL career statistics ==
Legend
**Bold**	Career high

=== Regular season ===
Year	Team	Games		Rushing					Receiving					Fumbles
Year	Team	GP	GS	Att	Yds	Avg	Lng	TD	Rec	Yds	Avg	Lng	TD	Fum
1979	NYG	**14**	0	0	0	–	–	**0**	0	0	–	–	**0**	0
1980	NYG	3	**1**	**19**	**50**	**2.6**	**9**	**0**	**1**	**4**	**4.0**	**4**	**0**	**2**
Career		17	1	19	50	2.6	9	0	1	4	4.0	4	0	2
