= Bill Bryant (American football) =

American football player (born 1951)

No. 21, 25
- Position: Cornerback

Personal information
- Born: January 15, 1951 (age 75); Shreveport, Louisiana, U.S.
- Listed height: 5 ft 11 in (1.80 m)
- Listed weight: 195 lb (88 kg)

Career information
- College: Grambling
- NFL draft: 1974: 6th round, 153rd overall pick

Career history
- New York Giants (1976–1978); Philadelphia Eagles (1978)

Career NFL statistics
- Interceptions: 3
- Fumble recoveries: 3
- Defensive touchdowns: 1
- Stats at Pro Football Reference

William Bryant Jr. (born January 15, 1951) is an American former professional football player who was a cornerback in the National Football League (NFL) for the New York Giants and Philadelphia Eagles. He played college football for the Grambling Tigers.

== Career ==
Bryant played college football at Grambling College—now Grambling State University—and was selected in the sixth round of the 1974 NFL draft by the Cincinnati Bengals. Bryant was also drafted by the Houston Texans in the thirty-third round of the 1974 World Football League college draft. He signed with the Texans and began the 1974 season with them before switching to the Birmingham Americans midway through the season when the Texans encountered financial difficulties. He played for the Birmingham Vulcans in the WFL's ill-fated 1975 season until the league folded on October 22, 1975.
