= Jim Krahl =

American football player (born 1955)

No. 74, 90
- Position: Defensive tackle

Personal information
- Born: November 19, 1955 (age 70); Houston, Texas, U.S.
- Listed height: 6 ft 5 in (1.96 m)
- Listed weight: 252 lb (114 kg)

Career information
- High school: Houston (TX) Westbury
- College: Texas Tech
- NFL draft: 1978: 5th round, 132nd overall pick

Career history
- New York Giants (1978); Baltimore Colts (1979–1980); San Francisco 49ers (1980)
- Stats at Pro Football Reference

Jim Krahl (born November 19, 1955) is an American former professional football defensive tackle. He played for the New York Giants in 1978, the Baltimore Colts from 1979 to 1980 and the San Francisco 49ers in 1980.
