= Jimmy DuBose =

American football player (born 1954)

No. 35
- Position: Fullback

Personal information
- Born: October 25, 1954 (age 72); Enterprise, Alabama, U.S.
- Listed height: 5 ft 11 in (1.80 m)
- Listed weight: 217 lb (98 kg)

Career information
- High school: Sarasota (FL)
- College: Florida
- NFL draft: 1976: 2nd round, 30th overall pick

Career history
- Tampa Bay Buccaneers (1976–1978)

Awards and highlights
- Second-team All-American (1975); SEC Player of the Year (1975); First-team All-SEC (1975); University of Florida Athletic Hall of Fame

Career NFL statistics
- Games played: 33
- Rushing attempts: 184
- Rushing yards: 704
- Receptions: 17
- Receiving yards: 118
- Touchdowns: 4
- Stats at Pro Football Reference

Jimmy DeWayne DuBose (born October 25, 1954) is an American former professional football player who was a running back in the National Football League (NFL) for three seasons during the 1970s. DuBose played college football for the University of Florida, and thereafter, he played professionally for the Tampa Bay Buccaneers of the NFL.

== Early life ==
DuBose was born in Enterprise, Alabama in 1954. He attended Sarasota High School in Sarasota, Florida, and he was a standout high school football player for the Sarasota Sailors, rushing for 1,400 yards and sixteen touchdowns as a senior.

== College career ==
DuBose accepted an athletic scholarship to attend the University of Florida in Gainesville, Florida, where he played fullback for coach Doug Dickey's Florida Gators football team from 1972 to 1975. Dickey described him as a "picture perfect fullback," able to run over people like a fullback but also able to run like a halfback in the open field. Memorably, DuBose ran for 180 yards against the Vanderbilt Commodores, including an eighty-yard touchdown run on the first play from scrimmage, and rushed for 204 yards versus the Florida State Seminoles as a senior. Averaging nearly seven yards per carry, he led the Gators to a 9–2 record, the first time the Gators had achieved nine regular-season wins.

DuBose's 2,159 career rushing yards are, as of 2009, the tenth-best in Gators team history; his senior-year effort of 1,307 yards remains the Gators' third-best season total (following two of Emmitt Smith's seasons). As a senior team captain in 1975, he rushed for 1,402 yards and six touchdowns on 209 carries, and was recognized as a first-team All-Southeastern Conference (SEC) selection, the SEC Player of the Year, and a second-team All-American; he also finished sixth in the Heisman Trophy balloting. DuBose was the recipient of the Gators' Fergie Ferguson Award recognizing the "senior football player who displayed outstanding leadership, character and courage." He graduated from Florida with a bachelor's degree in public relations in 1980, and was inducted into the University of Florida Athletic Hall of Fame as a "Gator Great" in 1987.

== Professional career ==
DuBose was selected by the expansion Tampa Bay Buccaneers in the second round (30th overall) of the 1976 NFL draft, following the Buccaneers' first-round pick, Leroy Selmon, and became part of the inaugural Buccaneers line-up. Hobbled by an injured ankle in his rookie season in 1976, he had trouble learning the Bucs system. Playing with a year's experience behind an improved line, he was the Bucs' most consistent runner in the 1977 preseason, earning the praise of Buccaneers offensive coordinator Joe Gibbs. In 1978, he became the Buccaneers' first-ever running back to gain 100 yards in a game. Unfortunately, only four plays after achieving this milestone, he tore knee ligaments while tackling New York Giants linebacker Harry Carson after an interception, an injury that benched him for the entire 1979 season. He never regained his pre-injury form, and was traded to the Miami Dolphins in 1980, along with a second-round draft pick for running back Gary Davis and cornerback Norris Thomas. Miami coach Don Shula cut DuBose from the squad, feeling that he would, at 205 pounds, be too small to replace Larry Csonka.

In his three-season NFL career, DuBose appeared in thirty-three games, started fifteen of them, and rushed for 704 yards and four touchdowns on 184 attempts. He also compiled seventeen receptions for 118 yards.

== Life after football ==
DuBose is married, and he and his wife have a son and a daughter. DuBose and his wife worked in education. DuBose retired in 2018.

== See also ==
- Florida Gators football, 1970–79
- History of the Tampa Bay Buccaneers
- List of Florida Gators football All-Americans
- List of Florida Gators in the NFL draft
- List of SEC Most Valuable Players
- List of University of Florida alumni
- University of Florida Athletic Hall of Fame
