= Steve Alvers =

American football player (born 1957)

No. 87, 86
- Positions: Tight end, center

Personal information
- Born: April 4, 1957 (age 69); Palm Beach, Florida, U.S.
- Listed height: 6 ft 4 in (1.93 m)
- Listed weight: 240 lb (109 kg)

Career information
- High school: North Miami Beach (North Miami Beach, Florida)
- College: Miami (FL)
- NFL draft: 1979: 7th round, 172nd overall pick

Career history
- New York Giants (1979); Buffalo Bills (1981); New York Jets (1982)

Career NFL statistics
- Games played: 19
- Stats at Pro Football Reference

Steven Dean Alvers (born April 4, 1957) is an American former professional football player who was a tight end and center in the National Football League (NFL) for the Buffalo Bills in 1981 and the New York Jets in 1982. He played college football for the Miami Hurricanes.
