= Brett Moritz =

American football player (born 1955)

No. 67
- Position: Guard

Personal information
- Born: July 15, 1955 (age 71); Lincoln, Nebraska, U.S.
- Listed height: 6 ft 5 in (1.96 m)
- Listed weight: 250 lb (113 kg)

Career information
- College: Army; Nebraska
- NFL draft: 1978: 2nd round, 44th overall pick

Career history
- Tampa Bay Buccaneers (1978)

Career NFL statistics
- Games played: 6
- Stats at Pro Football Reference

Brett I. Moritz (born July 15, 1955) is an American former professional football player who was a guard for the Tampa Bay Buccaneers of the National Football League (NFL) in 1978. He played college football for the Army Black Knights and Nebraska Cornhuskers.
