= Brian DeRoo =

American football player (born 1956)

No. 87
- Position: Wide receiver

Personal information
- Born: April 25, 1956 (age 70); Redlands, California, U.S.
- Listed height: 6 ft 3 in (1.91 m)
- Listed weight: 193 lb (88 kg)

Career information
- High school: Redlands
- College: Redlands
- NFL draft: 1978: 5th round, 137th overall pick

Career history
- New York Giants (1978); Baltimore Colts (1979–1981); Montreal Concordes (1982–1984)

Career NFL statistics
- Receptions: 7
- Receiving yards: 154
- Touchdowns: 1
- Stats at Pro Football Reference

Brian DeRoo (born April 25, 1956) is an American former professional football player who was a wide receiver in the National Football League (NFL) and Canadian Football League (CFL). He played for the Baltimore Colts from 1979 to 1981 and the Montreal Concordes from 1982 to 1984. He played college football for the Redlands Bulldogs.
