= Bert Cooper (American football) =

American football player (born 1952)

Profile
- Position: Linebacker

Personal information
- Born: August 24, 1952 (age 74); Tallahassee, Florida

Career information
- College: Florida State University
- NFL draft: 1975: 12th round, 299th overall pick

Career history
- 1976: Tampa Bay Buccaneers
- Stats at Pro Football Reference

Bertram Genard Cooper (born August 24, 1952) was a National Football League linebacker who played in 1976 for the Tampa Bay Buccaneers. He attended college at Florida State University and was the New York Jets 12th round pick in the 1975 NFL draft.
