= Cleveland Jackson =

American football player (born 1956)

No. 81
- Position: Tight end

Personal information
- Born: October 1, 1956 (age 70); Crossett, Arkansas, U.S.
- Listed height: 6 ft 4 in (1.93 m)
- Listed weight: 230 lb (104 kg)

Career information
- High school: Northwestern (Detroit, Michigan)
- College: Michigan State; Los Angeles Southwest; UNLV
- NFL draft: 1979: 5th round, 117th overall pick

Career history
- New York Giants (1979–1980); Philadelphia Eagles (1980)*; BC Lions (1981)*; Washington Redskins (1982)*; Arizona Wranglers (1983)*; Oklahoma Outlaws (1984)*
- * Offseason or practice squad member only

Career NFL statistics
- Games played: 2
- Receptions: 1
- Receiving yards: 7
- Stats at Pro Football Reference

Cleveland Lee Jackson (born October 1, 1956) is an American former professional football player who was a tight end for one season with the New York Giants of the National Football League (NFL). He played college football for three different schools before being selected in the fifth round (117th overall) of the 1979 NFL draft. He also spent time in the NFL with the Philadelphia Eagles and Washington Redskins, in the Canadian Football League (CFL) for the BC Lions, and in the United States Football League (USFL) for the Arizona Wranglers and Oklahoma Outlaws, but did not play.

== Early life and education ==
Jackson was born on October 1, 1956, in Crossett, Arkansas. He attended Northwestern High School in Detroit, Michigan, before starting a college football career with the Michigan State Spartans. After earning a varsity letter in 1975 with Michigan State, he transferred to Los Angeles Southwest College, spending the 1976 season with their team.

He made a second transfer in 1977 to University of Nevada, Las Vegas, often known as UNLV. He finished his education with the school, and played tight end on their varsity team in both seasons with the university.

== Professional career ==
After graduating from UNLV, Jackson was selected in the 5th round (117th overall) of the 1979 NFL draft by the New York Giants. He made the final roster, and was backup tight end in their first two games. Against the St. Louis Cardinals in week two, he made his first career catch (7 yards) before suffering a season-ending knee injury. He was subsequently placed on injured reserve. He was released by the Giants during the 1980 NFL preseason.

After being released by New York, Jackson was signed by the Philadelphia Eagles, only to be released a day later following a failed physical.

In 1981, Jackson returned to professional football by signing a contract with the BC Lions of the Canadian Football League (CFL). He did not make their final roster. He came back to the NFL in 1982 with the Washington Redskins, but was released on August 3.

Jackson moved to the United States Football League (USFL) in their inaugural season of 1983, being signed by the Arizona Wranglers. He did not make their final roster, and was released in February. He made a final comeback attempt the following year with the Oklahoma Outlaws, but was released in training camp.
