= Willie Spencer =

American football player (1953–2021)

Profile
- Position: Running back

Personal information
- Born: January 28, 1953; Massillon, Ohio, U.S.
- Died: September 19, 2021 (aged 68); Massillon, Ohio, U.S.
- Listed height: 6 ft 3 in (1.91 m)
- Listed weight: 235 lb (107 kg)

Career information
- High school: Massillon Washington

Career history
- Hartford Knights (1973); Memphis Southmen (1974–1975); Minnesota Vikings (1976); New York Giants (1977–1978)

Career statistics
- Games: 31
- Games started: 0
- Stats at Pro Football Reference

Willie Thomas Spencer Sr. (January 28, 1953 – September 19, 2021) was an American professional football player who was a running back in the National Football League (NFL).

Spencer was born in Massillon, Ohio, in 1953. He attended Massillon Washington High School. In 1971, he led the county with 116 points scored and 1,251 yards. He also played basketball and led Jefferson in rebounding as a senior.

Spencer opted to skip college football and signed in 1972 with the Ottawa Rough Riders of the Canadian Football League. He was cut by Ottawa in July 1972 and assigned to Indianapolis of the Midwest Football League.

In 1973, he played in the Atlantic Coast Football League for the Hartford Knights. He jumped to the Memphis Southmen of the newly formed World Football League (WFL) in 1974. He scored five touchdowns against the Jacksonville Sharks on October 2, 1974. He played two seasons with Memphis, appearing in 27 games and rushing for 1,369 yards during the 1974 and 1975 seasons.

The WFL folded after the 1975 season, and Spencer played in 1976 for the Minnesota Vikings of the National Football League (NFL). He concluded his football career with the New York Giants during the 1977 and 1978 seasons. He appeared in a total of 31 NFL games.

Spencer died on September 19, 2021.
