= Larry Mallory =

American football player (born 1952)

No. 34
- Position: Safety

Personal information
- Born: July 21, 1952 (age 74); Memphis, Tennessee, U.S.
- Listed height: 5 ft 11 in (1.80 m)
- Listed weight: 225 lb (102 kg)

Career information
- High school: Melrose
- College: Tennessee State
- NFL draft: 1975: undrafted

Career history
- Memphis Southmen (1975); New York Giants (1976–1978)
- Stats at Pro Football Reference

Larry Montel Mallory (born July 21, 1952) is an American former professional football player who was a safety for the New York Giants of the National Football League (NFL). He played college football for the Tennessee State Tigers.
