= Al Dixon =

American football player (born 1954)

No. 84, 86
- Position: Tight end

Personal information
- Born: April 5, 1954 (age 72); Drew, Mississippi, U.S.
- Listed height: 6 ft 5 in (1.96 m)
- Listed weight: 230 lb (104 kg)

Career information
- High school: East St. Louis (IL)
- College: Iowa State
- NFL draft: 1977: 7th round, 178th overall pick

Career history
- New York Giants (1977–1979); Kansas City Chiefs (1979-1982); Philadelphia Eagles (1983); San Francisco 49ers (1984)

Awards and highlights
- Super Bowl champion (XIX)

Career NFL statistics
- Receptions: 84
- Receiving yards: 1,248
- Receiving TDs: 8
- Stats at Pro Football Reference

Albert D. Dixon (born April 5, 1954) is an American former professional football player who was a tight end in the National Football League (NFL) for the New York Giants, Kansas City Chiefs, Philadelphia Eagles, and San Francisco 49ers. He played college football for the Iowa State Cyclones and was selected by the Giants in the seventh round (178th pick overall) of the 1977 NFL draft.

Dixon was a member of the 49ers during their 1984 championship season, appearing in two games against the Los Angeles Rams and Cincinnati Bengals, although he is not listed among the players who actually took the field for the team's victory in Super Bowl XIX.
