= James Thompson (American football) =

American football player (born 1953)

No. 48, 46
- Position: Wide receiver

Personal information
- Born: January 9, 1953 (age 73); Memphis, Tennessee, U.S.
- Listed height: 6 ft 0 in (1.83 m)
- Listed weight: 178 lb (81 kg)

Career information
- High school: Melrose (Memphis)
- College: Memphis State
- NFL draft: 1975: undrafted

Career history
- Charlotte Hornets (1975); Washington Redskins (1976–1977)*; New York Giants (1978)
- * Offseason or practice squad member only
- Stats at Pro Football Reference

James Thompson III (born January 9, 1953) is an American former professional football wide receiver who played for the New York Giants of the National Football League (NFL). He played college football for the Memphis State Tigers.

== Early life ==
James Thompson III was born on January 9, 1953, in Memphis, Tennessee. He played high school football and basketball at Melrose High School in Memphis.

== College career ==
Thompson enrolled at Memphis State University to play college football for the Tigers. He played for the freshman team in 1971 and the varsity team from 1972 to 1974. He tied a single-season school-record with 46 receptions in 1973. Thompson led the team in receiving yards as a senior team captain in 1974 with 40 catches for 395 yards and five touchdowns, earning Associated Press second-team All-South Independent honors. He finished his college career with 105 catches for 1,183 yards and seven touchdowns. His reception and receiving yard career totals were all-time school records.

== Professional career ==
Thompson went undrafted in the 1975 NFL draft. He signed with the Charlotte Hornets of the World Football League (WFL) on July 2, 1975. He played in nine games, starting three, for the Hornets during the 1975 WFL season, catching 19 passes for 277 yards and one touchdown while also returning seven punts for 54 yards. The WFL folded during midseason.

Thompson signed with the Washington Redskins in April 1976. He was released on September 6, 1976, before the start of the regular season. Thompson signed with the Redskins again in 1977. However, he was released in early August after the first game of the 1977 preseason.

Thompson later signed with the New York Giants for the 1978 season. Giants receiver coach Lindy Infante was Thompson's offensive coordinator at Memphis State. Thompson played in 13 games, starting one, for the Giants in 1978, recording seven receptions for 113 yards on 17 targets while also returning two punts for four yards. He was placed on injured reserve on December 8, 1978. He was released on August 20, 1979, after the third of four preseason games.
