= Bobby Hammond =

American football player and coach (born 1952)

No. 33, 34
- Position: Running back

Personal information
- Born: February 20, 1952 (age 74); Orangeburg, South Carolina, U.S.
- Listed height: 5 ft 10 in (1.78 m)
- Listed weight: 171 lb (78 kg)

Career information
- High school: Bayside (NY)
- College: Morgan State
- NFL draft: 1975: undrafted

Career history

Playing
- New York Giants (1975)*; New Orleans Saints (1976)*; New York Giants (1976-1979); Washington Redskins (1979-1980)
- * Offseason or practice squad member only

Coaching
- New York Jets (1983–1989) Running backs coach; Phoenix Cardinals (1990–1991) Running backs coach; Philadelphia Eagles (1993–1994) Offensive and special teams assistant; London Monarchs (1995–1996) Head coach

Awards and highlights
- Morgan State University Athletic Hall of Fame

Career NFL statistics
- Rushing attempts: 332
- Rushing yards: 1,401
- Rushing touchdowns: 4
- Stats at Pro Football Reference

Head coaching record
- Career: 4–8 (WLAF)

Robert Lee Hammond (born February 20, 1952) is an American former professional football player and coach. He was a running back in the National Football League (NFL) for five seasons with the New York Giants and Washington Redskins after playing college football for the Morgan State Bears. Hammond also was an assistant coach in the NFL for 11 years and served as head coach for the London Monarchs of the World League of American Football (WLAF) from 1995 to 1996.

== Early life ==
Hammond played high school football at Bayside High School in Bayside, New York.

== Later life ==
After retiring from playing football, Hammond worked for the Pony sportswear company, signing players for product endorsements.

Now holding a doctorate and working in higher education, Hammond currently coordinates an academic support program at Camden County College in Camden, New Jersey.
