= Jimmy Robinson (American football) =

American football player and coach (born 1953)

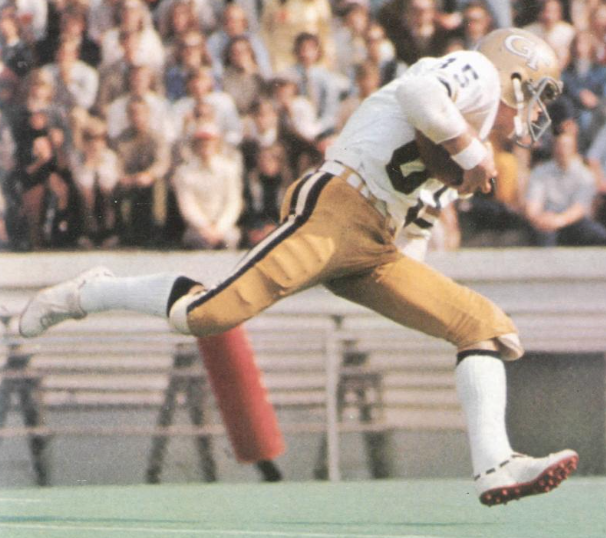
- Robinson during a 1972 game

No. 85
- Position: Wide receiver

Personal information
- Born: January 3, 1953 (age 73); New York, New York, U.S.
- Listed height: 5 ft 9 in (1.75 m)
- Listed weight: 170 lb (77 kg)

Career information
- High school: Columbia (NJ)
- College: Georgia Tech
- NFL draft: 1975: 15th round, 367th overall pick

Career history

Playing
- Atlanta Falcons (1975)*; New York Giants (1976–1979); San Francisco 49ers (1980); Denver Broncos (1981)
- * Offseason or practice squad member only

Coaching
- Memphis Showboats (1984–1985); Georgia Tech (1987–1989); Atlanta Falcons (1990–1993); Indianapolis Colts (1994–1997); New York Giants (1998–2003); New Orleans Saints (2004–2005); Green Bay Packers (2006–2010); Dallas Cowboys (2011–2015)

Awards and highlights
- As coach: Super Bowl champion (XLV) (as wide receivers coach with Green Bay Packers)

Career NFL statistics
- Receptions: 85
- Receiving yards: 1,437
- Receiving touchdowns: 6
- Stats at Pro Football Reference

Jimmy Robinson (born January 3, 1953) is an American former professional football player who was a wide receiver in the National Football League (NFL). He played college football for the Georgia Tech Yellow Jackets. He played in the NFL for the New York Giants and San Francisco 49ers. After his playing career, he was a wide receivers coach in professional football since 1984, coaching for the Memphis Showboats, Georgia Tech Yellow Jackets, Atlanta Falcons, Indianapolis Colts, New York Giants, New Orleans Saints, Green Bay Packers, and Dallas Cowboys.

== Playing career ==
=== High school ===
Robinson played his high school football at Ridgeview High School in North Atlanta.

=== College ===
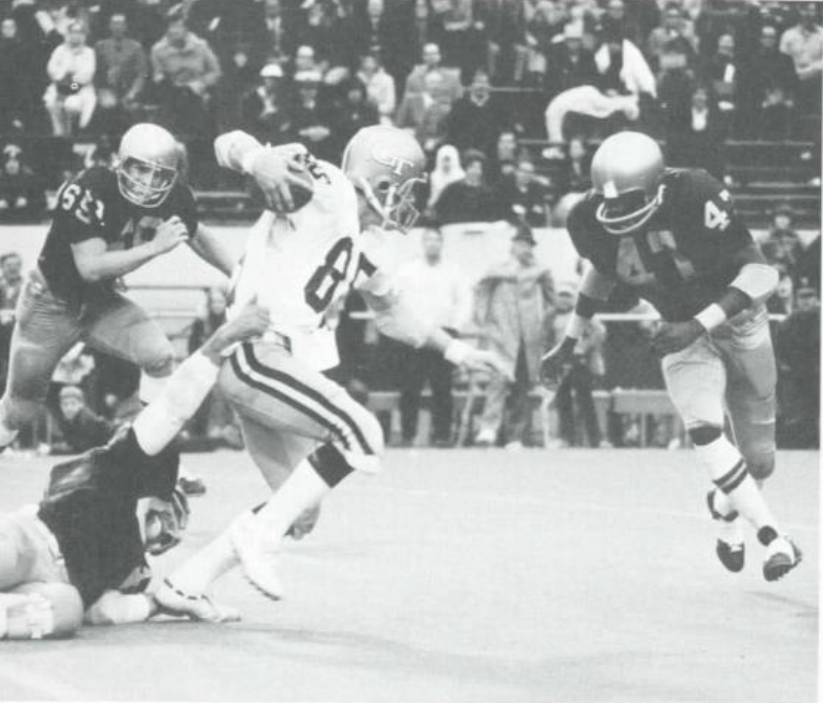
Robinson (#85) during a game against the Navy Midshipmen on November 18, 1972

Robinson was a star wide receiver for the Georgia Tech Yellow Jackets from 1971 to 1974. During his career he caught 101 passes for 1,633 yards and 13 touchdowns. In 1981, he was inducted into Georgia Tech's Hall of Fame and Tech's all-time team in 1992.

=== Professional ===
Robinson was selected in the 15th round of the 1975 NFL draft by the Atlanta Falcons with the 367th overall pick. He signed with the New York Giants in 1976. He led the Giants in receptions in 1977 with 22 and 1978 with 32. He also scored the first touchdown in Giants Stadium history in a pass from Craig Morton. After a season each with the San Francisco 49ers (1980) and the Denver Broncos (1981), he retired with 85 receptions for 1,437 yards and six touchdowns.

== Coaching career ==
=== Memphis Showboats ===
Robinson's first coaching position came in 1984 when he became the wide receivers / tight ends coach for the United States Football League's Memphis Showboats. He spent two seasons coaching for the Showboats before the league folded.

=== Georgia Tech Yellow Jackets ===
In 1987 Robinson returned to the Georgia Tech Yellow Jackets to be their wide receivers coach. He coached for the Yellow Jackets from 1987 to 1989.

=== Atlanta Falcons ===
In 1990 Robinson joined the Atlanta Falcons, where he helped Andre Rison and Michael Haynes to the top of the NFL's touchdown receptions list for a tandem. The next year, he helped Rison and Mike Pritchard led the league again in the category. Overall, he coached the Falcons from 1990 to 1993.

=== Indianapolis Colts ===
In 1994, he joined the Indianapolis Colts staff, where he helped launch the career of Marvin Harrison, who became only the third rookie in club history to lead the team in receiving. He coached the Colts from 1994 to 1997.

=== New York Giants ===
In 1998 Robinson returned to the New York Giants, where he spent most of his playing career. As the Giants wide receiver coach for six seasons, he steered that unit to the most successful seasons in club history. In 1999, Amani Toomer and Ike Hilliard became the first pair of Giants receivers to combine to surpass 2,000 yards. In 2001, he helped his unit catch a team-record 186 passes for 2,680 yards and 15 touchdowns and a trip to Super Bowl XXXV. He helped Amani Toomer become one of the best wide receivers in Giants history. He coached the Giants from 1998 to 2003.

=== New Orleans Saints ===
In 2004 Robinson joined the New Orleans Saints. During his first season he helped guide Joe Horn to tie a career best and match the NFC lead with 94 receptions and set Saints records with 1,399 receiving yards and 11 touchdown grabs. He coached for the Saints in 2004 and 2005.

=== Green Bay Packers ===
In 2006, Robinson joined Green Bay Packers new head coach Mike McCarthy's staff. Robinson's dedication to fundamentals and his focus on details has helped mold a mixture of veterans and younger players into a productive unit in Green Bay. Donald Driver had two Pro Bowl trips in 2006 and 2007. In 2007, he helped Greg Jennings finish tied for fourth in the NFL in receiving touchdowns with 12. In 2010, Robinson's final season in Green Bay, the Packers won Super Bowl XLV, defeating the Pittsburgh Steelers by a score of 31–25.

=== Dallas Cowboys ===
Robinson was hired by the Dallas Cowboys on February 11, 2011, as the assistant head coach and wide receivers coach. Robinson later transitioned to the role of coaching consultant for the Cowboys and was replaced in his role as wide receivers coach by former Tennessee Volunteers head coach Derek Dooley.
