= Frank Marion (American football) =

American football player (born 1951)

No. 51
- Position: Linebacker

Personal information
- Born: March 16, 1951 (age 75); Mount Brook, Florida, U.S.
- Listed height: 6 ft 3 in (1.91 m)
- Listed weight: 227 lb (103 kg)

Career information
- High school: Gainesville (FL) Lincoln; Gainesville (FL)
- College: Florida A&M
- NFL draft: 1977: undrafted

Career history
- New York Giants (1977–1983)

Career NFL statistics
- Sacks: 1.5
- Fumble recoveries: 4
- Interceptions: 1
- Stats at Pro Football Reference

Frank N. Marion II (born March 16, 1951) is an American former professional football player who was a linebacker for seven seasons for the New York Giants of the National Football League (NFL). He played college football for the Florida A&M Rattlers.

Marion is the older brother of former New England Patriots safety, Fred Marion.
