= Ernie Jones (defensive back) =

American football player (born 1953)

No. 49, 31, 37
- Position: Safety

Personal information
- Born: January 3, 1953 (age 73); Boca Raton, Florida, U.S.
- Listed height: 6 ft 3 in (1.91 m)
- Listed weight: 180 lb (82 kg)

Career information
- High school: Boca Raton
- College: Miami
- NFL draft: 1976: 5th round, 153rd overall pick

Career history
- Seattle Seahawks (1976); New York Giants (1977–1979)

Career NFL statistics
- Interceptions: 6
- Fumble recoveries: 7
- Defensive touchdowns: 1
- Stats at Pro Football Reference

Ernest Jones (born January 3, 1953) is an American former professional football player who was a defensive back for four seasons in the National Football League (NFL) from 1976 to 1979 with the Seattle Seahawks and New York Giants. He was selected by the Seahawks in the fifth round of the 1976 NFL draft after playing college football for the Miami Hurricanes. After playing mostly as a backup cornerback for the Seahawks in 1976, the Seahawks moved him to free safety during the 1977 preseason, but he was waived before the start of the 1977 season and signed by the Giants. Jones was waived by the Giants during the 1980 preseason and was not picked up by any other team, ending his pro football career. Giants' head coach Ray Perkins said of waiving Jones that Jones could no longer play "at a level of winning football" due to a foot injury he suffered during the 1979 season and added that "I recommended he retire. Getting waived was his choice. I know we spoke to nine teams and there was no interest." According to Jones' roommate and fellow Giants' defensive back Beasley Reece, Jones spent the 1980 offseason working to regain his mobility but wasn't able to.

== Personal life ==
After his playing career, in 1987 he became a police officer for the Miami Dade Police Department retiring as a Sergeant in 2012. He has 2 kids (son & daughter) and 3 Grandchildren. Currently resides in Miami, FL
