= 1971 Nebraska vs. Oklahoma football game =

1971 Nebraska vs. Oklahoma
- Conference game "Game of the Century"
Nebraska Cornhuskers	Oklahoma Sooners
(10–0)	(9–0)
35	31
Head coach: Bob Devaney	Head coach: Chuck Fairbanks
AP / Coaches; 1 / 1	AP / Coaches; 2 / 2
	1	2	3	4	Total
Nebraska	7	7	14	7	35
Oklahoma	3	14	7	7	31
- Date: November 25, 1971
- Season: 1971
- Stadium: Owen Field
- Location: Norman, Oklahoma
- Favorite: Nebraska by 1
- National anthem: The Pride of Oklahoma
- Referee: Vance Carlson
- Attendance: 63,365 (Note: Many sources list attendance as 61,826 (the stadium's capacity), while those accounting for additional attendees claim 63,385.)

United States TV coverage
- Network: ABC
- Announcers: Chris Schenkel (play-by-play); Bud Wilkinson (analyst); Bill Flemming (sideline)

The 1971 Nebraska vs. Oklahoma football game was the fifty-first edition of the Nebraska–Oklahoma rivalry, held on November 25, 1971, at Owen Field in Norman, Oklahoma. It featured the country's first- and second-ranked teams and is one of several games called the "Game of the Century." It is often considered the greatest college football game ever played.

The buildup was immense as the teams had ranked first and second for months, and there was a widespread expectation the winner would go on to claim the national championship. The Cornhuskers jumped out to an early lead before Oklahoma's explosive wishbone offense could solve Nebraska's stout defensive line. Just before halftime, Jack Mildren led a pair of scoring drives to put the Sooners ahead 17–14. Two quick third-quarter scores put NU back in front, but Mildren again rallied his offense to a three-point lead with minutes remaining. As time wound down, a lengthy Cornhuskers drive was capped by Jeff Kinney's fourth touchdown and Nebraska won 35–31.

The game was viewed by a record audience and received widespread acclaim. ABC analyst Bud Wilkinson said "I don't think there has ever been a college game with as many great players on the field," and several of its moments, especially Johnny Rodgers's first-quarter punt return, have become iconic. Nebraska claimed its second consecutive national championship months later. The series became one of college football's great rivalries in the following decades, but essentially ended when NU joined the Big Ten in 2011.

== Background ==
In 1971, Nebraska and Oklahoma were each among the best teams of the era, combining for seventeen of twenty-two all-Big Eight selections and twelve staff members who became FBS or NFL head coaches. The headline matchup of the "Game of the Century" was Nebraska's defense (allowing 6.4 points per game and leading the country in total defense) against Oklahoma's new wishbone offense (scoring 44.6 points per game and leading the country in total offense). Heading into their November 25 meeting in Norman, the closest game for either team was a 20–3 OU victory over Missouri.

When OU's offense struggled to begin 1970, fifth-year coordinator Barry Switzer led a switch to the wishbone, made famous by Red River rival Texas. In its first full season using the formation, Oklahoma averaged an NCAA-record 472 rushing yards per game. (Note: The Sooners averaged 481 rushing yards entering the game against Nebraska, and finished the season at 472.) The attack relied on quick decision-making by "wishbone wizard" Jack Mildren, who was joined in the backfield by Heisman Trophy contender Greg Pruitt and speedy split end Jon Harrison, while All-American center Tom Brahaney anchored the offensive line. OU began the season ranked tenth nationally but ascended to second after dominant wins over USC and Texas.

Nebraska's offense – less prolific than Oklahoma's, but still among the country's best – followed a similar path. After a pair of 6–4 seasons in the late 1960s, head coach Bob Devaney gave offensive control to thirty-one-year-old I formation disciple Tom Osborne. Osborne's later teams were famous for their use of the run-heavy I-form option, but his first offenses relied on a more balanced attack with similarities to modern spread formations. Nebraska was the country's top-ranked team for nearly all of 1971, winning each of its first ten games by at least twenty-seven points behind a dominating defense led by Rich Glover and Outland Trophy winner Larry Jacobson.

Though the Big Eight title was yet to be determined, both teams' postseason destinations were set. Defending national champion Nebraska would face Alabama in the Orange Bowl and Oklahoma would play in the Sugar Bowl, thanks to a gamble by Orange Bowl officials that the No. 1 Cornhuskers and the No. 3 Crimson Tide, facing undefeated Auburn two days after the Game of the Century, would win their respective rivalry matchups.

=== Buildup ===
Both teams had extra time to prepare, as neither played the weekend of November 20. The buildup to the Thanksgiving Day game – assigned various nicknames, including "Game of the Century," "Game of the Decade," "The Big One," and "Game for All Decades" – was unprecedented. Oklahoma expanded the press box at Owen Field to accommodate credential requests from over one hundred reporters across sixty-five newspapers and twenty states, some of which still had to be denied. The November 22 cover of Sports Illustrated featured nose-to-nose photographs of linebacker Bob Terrio and running back Greg Pruitt with the headline "Irresistible Oklahoma Meets Immovable Nebraska."

Nebraska was installed as a narrow favorite, with famed bookmaker Jimmy the Greek saying "it should be the most interesting and exciting football game played in the last fifteen years." State governors David Hall and J. James Exon both attended, and bet a hundred pounds of Oklahoma peanuts against a hundred pounds of Nebraska beef. Resale tickets became so expensive the IRS issued a warning that their price violated the Economic Stabilization Act of 1970.

Some Oklahomans waved banners and fingers at the Nebraska buses during the forty-five minute trip from Will Rogers Airport to Norman, and students jeered the Cornhuskers during on-campus walkthroughs. OU coach Chuck Fairbanks shut off phones in the football dormitory, while Nebraska brought its own provisions to Norman to avoid the risk of food poisoning. A chance encounter between the teams on Wednesday evening was followed by a restless night and nervous morning, and players recalled vomiting from anxiety leading up to kickoff.

== Game ==
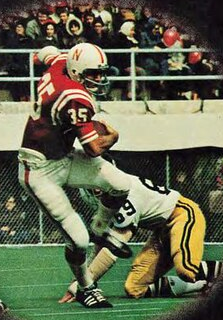
Nebraska I-back Jeff Kinney rushed for 174 yards and scored four touchdowns in the Game of the Century

=== First half ===
Former Oklahoma head coach Bud Wilkinson, ABC's color analyst for the game, received an ovation when he emerged from the tunnel before kickoff. The game began shortly after 1:50 p.m. CST on a cloudy, crisp fall day in front of a record crowd at Owen Field that included an estimated five thousand Nebraska supporters. Oklahoma won the toss and elected to kick.

After a three-and-out by each team, Nebraska took a 7–0 lead on a seventy-two-yard punt return by wingback Johnny Rodgers. Though it was early in the first quarter, the return became the game's and one of college football's signature moments, largely due to play-by-play announcer Lyell Bremser's radio call: "holy moly! Man, woman, and child did that put 'em in the aisles! Johnny "The Jet" Rodgers just tore 'em loose from their shoes!" After stopping an eighty-five-yard Oklahoma drive short of the end zone, a second Nebraska touchdown stretched the lead to 14–3 early in the second quarter.

Devaney and defensive line coach Monte Kiffin (the unit's de facto coordinator) had stressed the importance of containing Pruitt on the wide tosses and sweeps that made the wishbone so explosive. Kiffin also rotated his secondary so better-tackling defensive backs were closer to the middle of the field, presenting soft coverage on the perimeter with the belief Mildren posed little threat as a passer (OU averaged less than seven pass attempts per game). The emphasis on Pruitt made Mildren, Leon Crosswhite, and the inside run game the focal point of Oklahoma's attack, which initially struggled without production from its star back. Glover, with Brahaney blocking him one-on-one, wreaked havoc in the OU backfield, finishing with twenty-two tackles.

Trailing 14–3, Mildren led a pair of long touchdown drives around a missed NU field goal, capping the second with two deep passes to Harrison (left in man-to-man coverage against an out-of-position Bill Kosch) that gave OU a 17–14 halftime lead. Nebraska suddenly faced its first deficit of the season against an offense that had already accumulated more yards than NU had allowed in an entire game.

=== Second half ===
Nebraska made sweeping changes to its gameplan at halftime, committing to the run game on offense and providing support to its overwhelmed secondary. Oklahoma forced a quick punt to start the second half, but fumbled back to Nebraska near midfield. A long run by quarterback Jerry Tagge set up a touchdown to retake the lead, and minutes later, a third Kinney score made it 28–17 with 3:38 remaining in the third quarter. Oklahoma again faced an eleven-point deficit, responding with a lengthy drive highlighted by a fifty-one-yard reverse pass from Harrison to Al Chandler. A Tagge fumble in OU territory was followed by a twelve-play drive and a second Jon Harrison touchdown, giving the Sooners a 31–28 lead with 7:10 to play. It was Oklahoma's fifth scoring drive of over sixty yards, causing the normally even-tempered Devaney to lash out at his defense: "why don't you guys give Rich Glover some help once in a while?"

With rain beginning to fall, Tagge methodically led the Cornhuskers down the field, converting a third down on a diving catch by Rodgers. Once in the red zone, Kinney carried four consecutive times, the last of which gave Nebraska a 35–31 lead with 1:38 remaining. Kinney's dive into the end zone with his tearaway jersey in tatters became one of the game's iconic images. Mildren overthrew a potential touchdown to Harrison on the ensuing possession, and Nebraska forced a turnover on downs to seal the victory.

Nebraska players carried Devaney off the field in celebration of what he called "the biggest win of my career." The game featured 829 offensive yards, four lead changes, and just two penalties. (Note: Many accounts claim a single penalty (an offside against Nebraska), but Oklahoma's official website also lists a five-yard penalty against the Sooners.) Kinney rushed for 151 second-half yards in support of a stagnant Nebraska passing game that netted just sixty-five yards. Oklahoma was held to a season-low in rushing, but its 467 total yards were nearly 200 more than Nebraska allowed in any other game.

=== Scoring summary ===
Qtr	Time	Team	Detail	NU	OU
1	11:28	NU	Johnny Rodgers 72-yd punt return (Rich Sanger kick)	7	0
1	5:53	OU	John Carroll 30-yd field goal	7	3
2	11:08	NU	Jeff Kinney 1-yd run (Sanger kick)	14	3
2	5:10	OU	Jack Mildren 3-yd run (Carroll kick)	14	10
2	0:28	OU	Jon Harrison 24-yd pass from Mildren (Carroll kick)	14	17
3	8:54	NU	Kinney 3-yd run (Sanger kick)	21	17
3	3:38	NU	Kinney 1-yd run (Sanger kick)	28	17
3	0:28	OU	Mildren 3-yd run (Carroll kick)	28	24
4	7:10	OU	Harrison 16-yd pass from Mildren (Carroll kick)	28	31
4	1:38	NU	Kinney 2-yd run (Sanger kick)	35	31

== Statistics ==
=== Team statistics ===
Statistic	Nebraska	Oklahoma
First downs	19	22
Rushes–yards	59–297	64–279
Comp.–att.–yards	6–13–65	6–11–188
Total offense	362	467
Turnovers	1	3
Punts–average	5–36.4	3–35.7
Penalties–yards	1–5	1–5

=== Individual statistics ===
Rushing
Team	Player	Car.	Yards	TD
NU	Jeff Kinney	31	174	4
NU	Jerry Tagge	17	49	0
NU	Johnny Rodgers	4	27	0
NU	Steve Damkroger	3	23	0
NU	Bill Olds	4	22	0
NU	Gary Dixon	1	2	0
OU	Jack Mildren	31	130	2
OU	Leon Crosswhite	12	59	0
OU	Greg Pruitt	10	53	0
OU	Tim Welch	8	26	0
OU	Joe Wylie	3	11	0

Passing
Team	Player	C—A	Yards	TD	INT
NU	Jerry Tagge	6–12	65	0	0
NU	Johnny Rodgers	0–1	0	0	0
OU	Jack Mildren	5–10	137	2	0
OU	Jon Harrison	1–1	51	0	0

Receiving
Team	Player	Rec.	Yards	TD
NU	Johnny Rodgers	5	61	0
NU	Jeff Kinney	1	4	0
OU	Jon Harrison	4	115	2
OU	Al Chandler	2	73	0

== Starting lineups ==
Nebraska	Position	Oklahoma
Offense
Woody Cox	SE	Jon Harrison
Jeff Kinney	Back	Leon Crosswhite
Bill Olds	Back	Greg Pruitt
Johnny Rodgers	Back	Joe Wylie
Jerry List	TE	Al Chandler
Jerry Tagge	QB	Jack Mildren
Daryl White	LT	Dean Unruh
Dick Rupert	LG	Darryl Emmert
Doug Dumler	C	Tom Brahaney
Keith Wortman	RG	Ken Jones
Al Austin	RT	Robert Jensen
Defense
Larry Jacobson	DT	Derland Moore
Bill Janssen	DT	Lucious Selmon
Rich Glover	MG	
John Adkins	DE	Lionell Day
Willie Harper	DE	Ray Hamilton
Jim Branch	LB	Steve Aycock
Dave Mason	LB	Mark Driscoll
Bob Terrio	LB	Albert Quails
Jim Anderson	CB	Steve O'Shaughnessy
Joe Blahak	CB	Kenith Pope
Bill Kosch	S	Larry Roach
	S	John Shelley

== Officials ==
- Referee: Vance Carlson
- Umpire: John Keck
- Linesman: Wendell Winkler
- Field judge: Chet Laney
- Back judge: Skip Meyerfield
- Alternate: John McClintock

== Aftermath ==
"They can quit playing now, they have played the perfect game."

— Sportswriter Dave Kindred

=== Postgame ===
The immediate reaction was universal praise of a game that met the considerable expectations placed upon it. Dave Kindred of the Courier Journal wrote "they can quit playing now, they have played the perfect game," while the UPI's Charlie Smith said "P. T. Barnum and Ben-Hur met on a football field Thursday." Sports Illustrated's Dan Jenkins suggested "it was the greatest collegiate football battle ever," a sentiment that has been maintained since, as it is considered one of the best games in the sport's history. Contemporary estimates suggested the game was viewed by eighty million people in the United States; though the actual number was likely closer to fifty-five or sixty million, it was the largest college football audience ever despite being played concurrently with an NFL game between the Cowboys and Rams.

United States President Richard Nixon, who had visited the University of Nebraska–Lincoln in January to honor its 1970 title-winning team, immediately called Devaney to congratulate him on his twenty-first consecutive victory; the distracted coach kept the president waiting for over thirty minutes. Nixon phoned Fairbanks as well, noting he "didn't like some of [the officials'] calls." Nebraska was greeted by 30,000 fans at Lincoln Airport, a crowd so large the plane was unable to reach its gate and was forced to deplane on the runway.

Switzer lamented the lack of touches by star running back Pruitt, who only carried ten times. Fairbanks later confessed he designated an assistant solely to interpret Monte Kiffin's defensive signals, and that OU solved them partway through the game.

=== Rest of the season ===
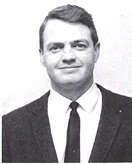
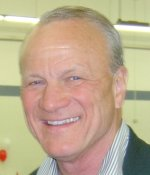
Tom Osborne (left) and Barry Switzer served as offensive coordinators during the Game of the Century, later becoming rivals as head coaches

Nebraska defeated Hawaii 45–3 to end its regular season before wrapping up a second consecutive national championship with a dominant win over second-ranked Alabama in the 1972 Orange Bowl. The team is regarded as one of the best in college football history. Nebraska was the first champion to defeat the next three finishers in the AP poll (No. 2 Oklahoma, No. 3 Colorado, and No. 4 Alabama), and the Big Eight became the first conference to place the top three teams in the final poll.

Hours after the NU–OU game ended, it was announced that Auburn quarterback Pat Sullivan had beat out Pruitt and Cornell's Ed Marinaro to win the Heisman Trophy. Pruitt and the Sooners decisively defeated Sullivan and the Tigers in the Sugar Bowl. OU's 1971 team is considered among the best to not win a national championship.

=== Rivalry ===
Devaney planned to retire but was convinced to return in 1972 to try for an unprecedented third consecutive national championship, naming Osborne his successor prior to the season. Though unsuccessful, Rodgers became Nebraska's first Heisman Trophy winner ahead of runner-up Greg Pruitt (a top-three finisher for the second straight year) and third-place Rich Glover. The Jet Award, created in 2011 to honor the country's top return specialist, features Rodgers's punt return touchdown from the Game of the Century, with Pruitt diving after him.

Switzer was named OU's head coach when Fairbanks departed the collegiate ranks in 1972 for the NFL's New England Patriots; his wishbone led OU to two national titles over the following four years. The success of both programs through the early 1970s was driven largely by black athletes, and Devaney, Fairbanks, Osborne, and Switzer were later credited for recruiting players that many schools, particularly those in the South, were unwilling to.

Osborne and Switzer entrenched the series as one of college football's great rivalries in the decades following the 1971 game. NU and OU remained traditional late-November opponents until the Big 12 Conference was formed in 1996. Though they no longer met annually, the rivals played several high-profile games before Nebraska's departure for the Big Ten in 2011. The series was renewed in 2021 and 2022, both Oklahoma victories, to commemorate the fiftieth anniversary of the Game of the Century.
