= Nebraska Cornhuskers football honors and awards =

This is a list of Nebraska Cornhuskers football honors and awards. Nebraska players have won twenty-nine major awards, including three Heisman Trophies, and the school's nine Outland Trophy winners are the most of any program.

== Heisman Trophy ==
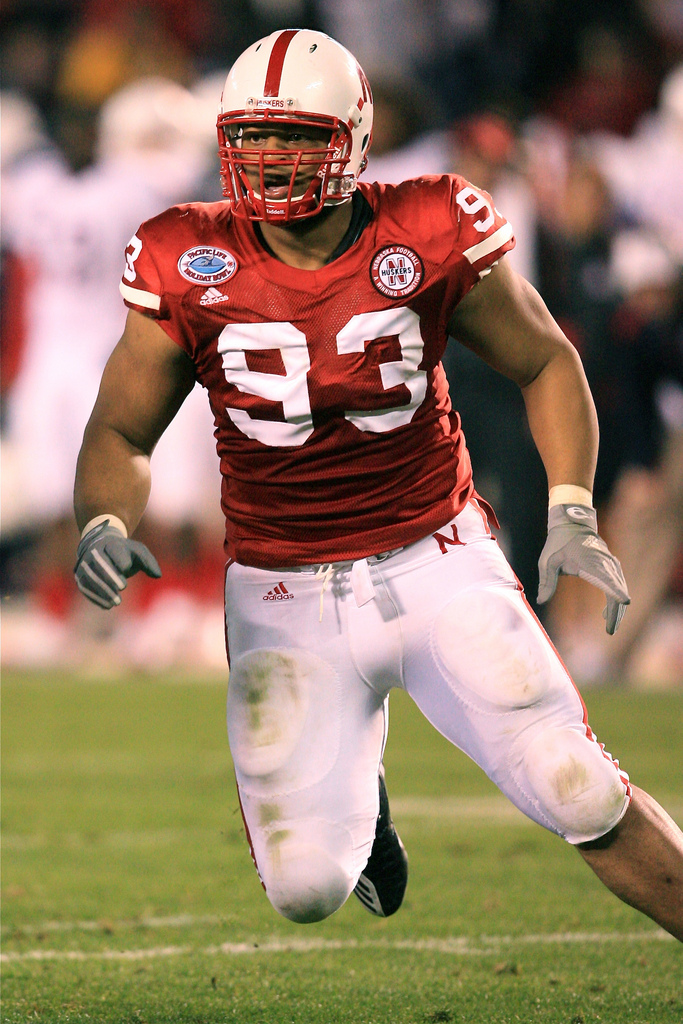
Ndamukong Suh won five major national awards and was a Heisman Trophy finalist in 2009

=== Winners ===
- Johnny Rodgers – 1972
- Mike Rozier – 1983
- Eric Crouch – 2001

=== Finalists ===
- Sam Francis – 1936
- Bobby Reynolds – 1950
- Rich Glover – 1972
- David Humm – 1974
- Dave Rimington – 1982
- Turner Gill – 1983
- Tommie Frazier – 1995
- Ndamukong Suh – 2009

== National awards ==
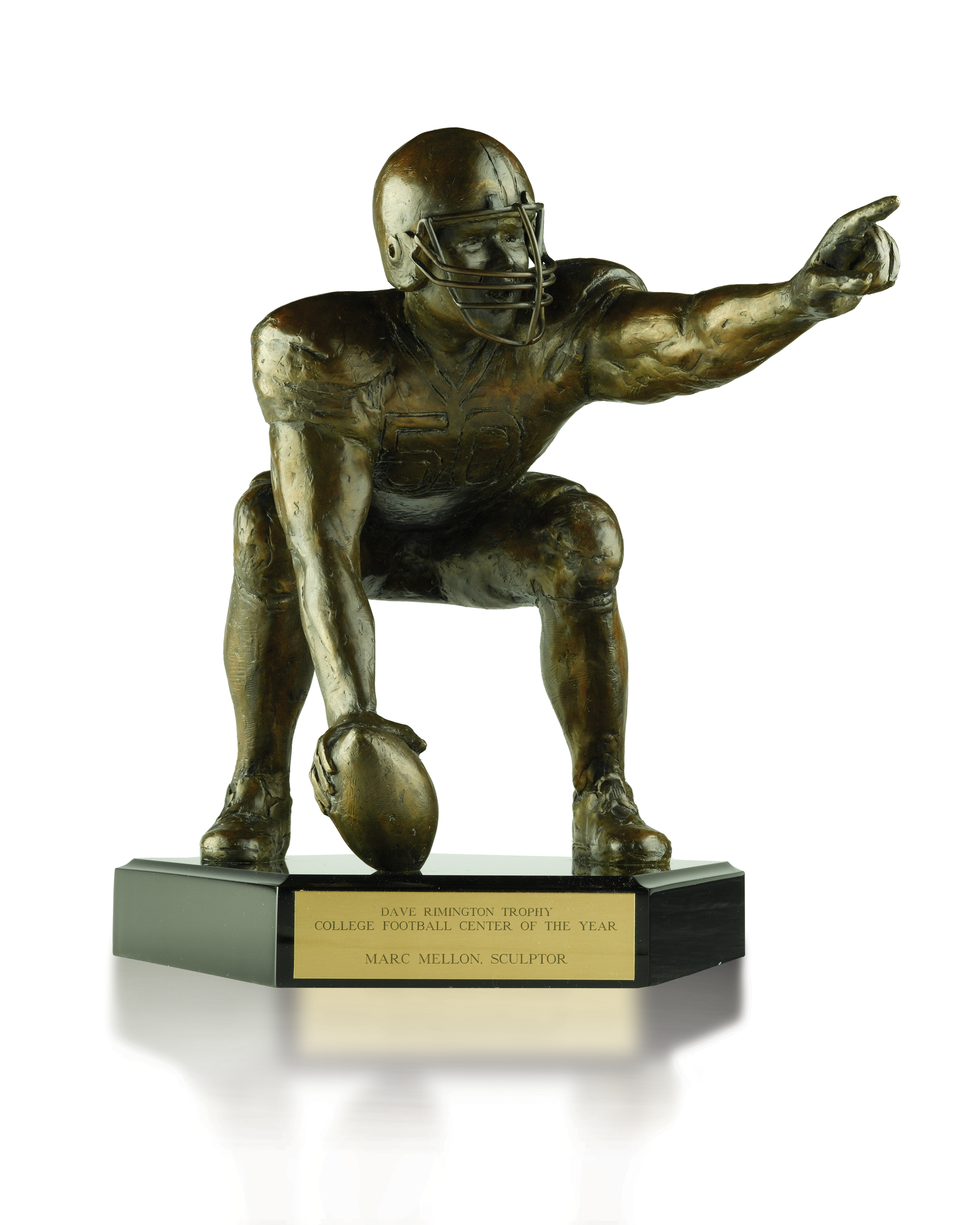
The Rimington Trophy, awarded to the country's best center, is named for Nebraska All-American Dave Rimington

=== Player of the year ===
- Associated Press (since 1998): Ndamukong Suh (2009)
- Bronko Nagurski Trophy (since 1993): (Note: The Bronko Nagurski Trophy was established by the Football Writers Association of America in 1993 to honor the country's best defensive player.) Ndamukong Suh (2009)
- Chuck Bednarik Award (since 1995): (Note: The Chuck Bednarik Award was established by the Maxwell Football Club in 1995 to honor the country's best defensive player.) Ndamukong Suh (2009)
- Maxwell Award (since 1937): (Note: The Maxwell Award was established in 1937 by the Maxwell Football Club to honor the country's best player.) Mike Rozier (1983)
- The Sporting News (since 1942): Mike Rozier (1983), Tommie Frazier (1995), Eric Crouch (2001)
- UPI (1950–1991): Johnny Rodgers (1972), Mike Rozier (1983)
- Walter Camp Award (since 1967): (Note: The Walter Camp Award was established in 1967 by the Walter Camp Football Foundation to honor the country's best player.) Johnny Rodgers (1972), Mike Rozier (1983), Eric Crouch (2001)

=== Player of the year by position ===
- Butkus Award (since 1985): (Note: The Butkus Award was established in 1985 to honor the country's best linebacker.) Trev Alberts (1993)
- Davey O'Brien Award (since 1981): (Note: The Davey O'Brien Award was established in 1977 to honor the best player in the Arkansas, Louisiana, New Mexico, Oklahoma and Texas. Four years later, it began honoring the country's best quarterback.) Eric Crouch (2001)
- Jet Award (since 2011): (Note: The Jet Award was established in 2011 to honor the country's best return specialist.) Pat Fischer (1960), DeJuan Groce (2002) (legacy winners)
- Johnny Unitas Golden Arm Award (since 1987): (Note: The Johnny Unitas Golden Arm Award was established in 1987 to honor the country's best upperclass quarterback.) Tommie Frazier (1995)
- Lombardi Award (since 1970): (Note: The Lombardi Award was established in 1970 to honor the country's best lineman.) Rich Glover (1972), Dave Rimington (1982), Dean Steinkuhler (1983), Grant Wistrom (1997), Ndamukong Suh (2009)
- Outland Trophy (since 1946): (Note: The Outland Trophy was established in 1946 by the Football Writers Association of America to honor the country's best interior lineman.) Larry Jacobson (1971), Rich Glover (1972), Dave Rimington (1981, 1982), Dean Steinkuhler (1983), Will Shields (1992), Zach Wiegert (1994), Aaron Taylor (1997), Ndamukong Suh (2009)
- Rimington Trophy (since 2000): (Note: The Rimington Trophy was established in 2000 by the Boomer Esiason Foundation to honor the country's best center.) Dominic Raiola (2000)
- UPI Lineman of the Year (1950–1996): Rich Glover (1972), Dave Rimington (1982), Dean Steinkuhler (1983), Zach Wiegert (1994)

=== Coach of the year ===
- AFCA: Tom Osborne (1994)
- Eddie Robinson: Bob Devaney (1971)
- Walter Camp: Bob Devaney (1971)

== Conference awards ==
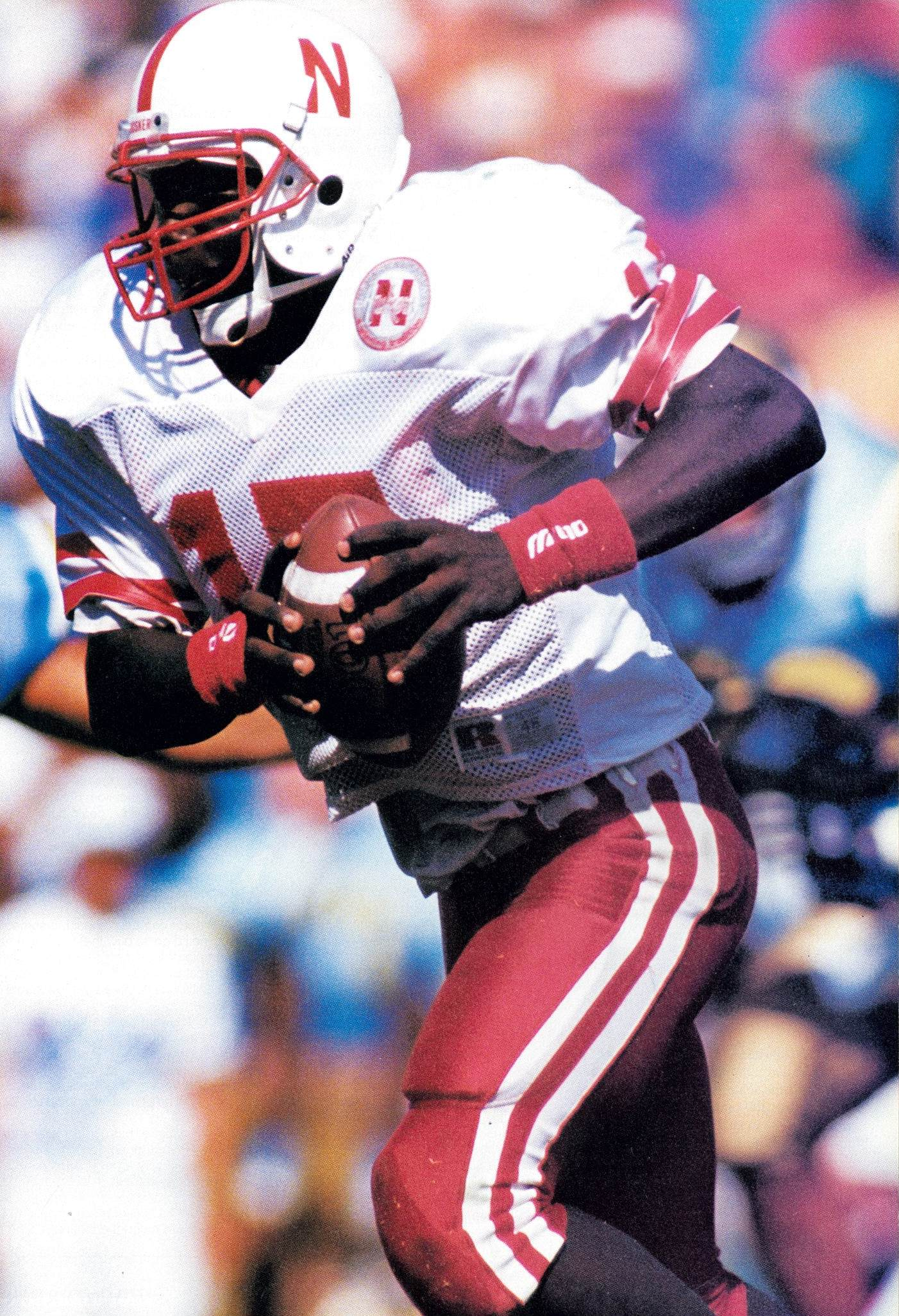
Tommie Frazier was named Big Eight player of the year in 1995

=== Athlete of the year ===
Seven Nebraska players have been named conference male athlete of the year, across all sports.

- Big Eight: Tom Ruud (1974–75), Dave Rimington (1982–83), Danny Noonan (1986–87), Trev Alberts (1993–94), Rob Zatechka (1994–95), Tommie Frazier (1995–96)
- Big 12: Grant Wistrom (1997–98)

=== Player of the year ===
Offensive

- Big Eight: Johnny Rodgers (1972), Dave Rimington (1981), Mike Rozier (1982, 1983), Gerry Gdowski (1989), Derek Brown (1992 – co), Calvin Jones (1992 – co), Tommie Frazier (1995)
- Big 12: Eric Crouch (1999, 2001), Zac Taylor (2006)

Defensive

- Big Eight: Jerry Murtaugh (1970), (Note: Jerry Murtaugh and Rich Glover were named Big Eight player of the year prior to the creation of separate offensive and defensive awards in 1972.) Rich Glover (1971, 1972), Clete Pillen (1976), Derrie Nelson (1980), Jimmy Williams (1981), Broderick Thomas (1988), Trev Alberts (1993), Ed Stewart (1994)
- Big 12: Grant Wistrom (1996, 1997), Ndamukong Suh (2009), Prince Amukamara (2010)

=== Freshman of the year ===
Offensive

- Big Eight: Monte Anthony (1974), Johnny Mitchell (1990), Tommie Frazier (1992), Ahman Green (1995)
- Big 12: Taylor Martinez (2010)

Defensive

- Big Eight: Tyrone Byrd (1989), Trev Alberts (1990)
- Big 12: Ralph Brown (1996)

=== Newcomer of the year ===
Offensive

- Big Eight: I. M. Hipp (1977), Jarvis Redwine (1979), Mike Rozier (1981), Calvin Jones, (1991), Tommie Frazier (1992), Ahman Green (1995)
- Big 12: Scott Frost (1996)

Defensive

- Big Eight: Toby Williams (1980), Bruce Pickens (1988), Tyrone Williams (1993), Grant Wistrom (1994), Terrell Farley (1995)
- Big 12: Lavonte David (2010)

=== Coach of the year ===
- Big Eight: Bob Devaney (1962, 1963, 1964, 1970), Tom Osborne (1973, 1975, 1976, 1980, 1983, 1988, 1992, 1993, 1994)
- Big 12: Tom Osborne (1996), Frank Solich (1999, 2001)

=== Other conference awards ===
- Defensive back of the year: (Note: All position-specific conference awards were presented by the Big Ten only.) Alfonzo Dennard (2011)
- Kicker of the year: Brett Maher (2011, 2012), Connor Culp (2020)
- Linebacker of the year: Lavonte David (2011)
- Punter of the year: Brett Maher (2011), Sam Foltz (2015)
- Tight end of the year: Austin Allen (2021)

== First-team all-conference selections ==
Nebraska has had 523 first-team all-conference selections: 446 in the Missouri Valley Intercollegiate Athletic Association and Big Eight, (Note: In 1928, the ten member schools of the Missouri Valley Intercollegiate Athletic Association agreed to a splintering of the conference – Iowa State, Kansas, Kansas State, Missouri, Nebraska, and Oklahoma retained the MVIAA name and Drake, Grinnell, Oklahoma A&M (now Oklahoma State), and Washington University formed the Missouri Valley Conference. The MVIAA became commonly known as the Big Six, and later the Big Seven and Big Eight. Its name was officially changed to the Big Eight in 1964.) fifty-nine in the Big 12, and eighteen in the Big Ten.

=== MVIAA / Big Eight ===
- Bill Chaloupka – 1907
- Harold Cook – 1907
- S. T. Frum – 1907
- John Weller – 1907
- Ernest Kroger – 1908
- Owen Frank – 1909, 1910
- LeRoy Temple – 1909, 1910
- W. F. Chauner – 1910, 1911
- Sylvester Shonka – 1910, 1911
- Leon Warner – 1910, 1911
- E. B. Elliott – 1911
- E. Z. Hornberger – 1911
- Vic Halligan – 1912, 1913, 1914
- J. D. Harmon – 1912
- J. T. M. Pearson – 1912
- Leonard Purdy – 1912, 1913
- Charles Beck – 1913
- Guy Mastin – 1913
- Dick Rutherford – 1913, 1914, 1915
- Max Towle – 1913
- E. L. Abbott – 1914, 1915
- Roy Cameron – 1914
- Guy Chamberlin – 1914, 1915
- H. H. Corey – 1914, 1915, 1916
- Warren Howard – 1914
- Paul Shields – 1915
- Hugo Otopalik – 1916
- John Cook – 1917
- Paul Dobson – 1917
- Roscoe Rhodes – 1917
- E. H. Schellenberg – 1917
- Edson Shaw – 1917
- Chick Hartley – 1921
- Glen Preston – 1921, 1922
- John Pucelik – 1921
- Clarence Swanson – 1921
- Joy Berquist – 1922, 1923
- Chick Hartley – 1922
- Dave Noble – 1922, 1923
- Leo Scherer – 1922
- Bub Weller – 1922
- Adolph Wenke – 1922
- Rufus Dewitz – 1923
- Ross McGlasson – 1923
- Choppy Rhodes – 1924, 1925
- Ed Weir – 1924, 1925
- Harold Hutchinson – 1925
- Glenn Presnell – 1926, 1927
- Lonnie Stiner – 1926
- Blue Howell – 1927, 1928
- Ted James – 1927, 1928
- Dan McMullen – 1927, 1928
- Roy Randels – 1927
- Clifford Ashburn – 1928
- Marion Broadstone – 1928, 1930
- Glen Munn – 1928
- Lafayette Russell – 1928
- Clair Sloan – 1928, 1929
- Steve Hokuf – 1929, 1930, 1932
- Ray Richards – 1929
- Harold Frahm – 1930
- Elmer Greenberg – 1930
- Hugh Rhea – 1930, 1931
- Lawrence Ely – 1931, 1932
- George Koster – 1931
- Everett Kreizinger – 1931
- George Sauer – 1931, 1932, 1933
- Corwin Hulbert – 1932
- Chris Mathis – 1932
- Lee Penney – 1932, 1933
- Clair Bishop – 1933
- Hubert Boswell – 1933
- Warren DeBus – 1933
- Bruce Kilbourne – 1933
- Bernie Masterson – 1933
- Frank Meier – 1933, 1934
- Gail O'Brien – 1933
- Henry Bauer – 1934
- Lloyd Cardwell – 1934, 1935, 1936
- Bernard Scherer – 1934, 1935
- Sam Francis – 1935, 1936
- Jerry LaNoue – 1935
- Fred Shirey – 1935, 1936, 1937
- Charles Brock – 1936, 1937, 1938
- Ron Douglas – 1936
- Les McDonald – 1936
- Elmer Dohrmann – 1937
- Ted Doyle – 1937
- Johnny Howell – 1937
- Bob Mehring – 1937
- Jack Dodd – 1938
- Warren Alfson – 1939, 1940
- Harry Hopp – 1939, 1940
- Herman Rohrig – 1939
- Forrest Behm – 1940
- Vike Francis – 1940
- Walter Luther – 1940
- Roy Petsch – 1940
- Ray Prochaska – 1940
- Ed Schwartzkopf – 1940
- George Abel – 1941
- Dale Bradley – 1941
- Fred Preston – 1941
- Charles Duda – 1942
- Vic Schleich – 1942
- Gerald Moore – 1945
- John Sedlacek – 1945
- Dick Hutton – 1946
- Tom Novak – 1946, 1947, 1948, 1949
- Carl Samuelson – 1946, 1947
- Sam Vacanti – 1946
- Charles Toogood – 1949, 1950
- Fran Nagle – 1950
- Bobby Reynolds – 1950
- Don Strasheim – 1950
- Dennis Emanuel – 1951, 1952
- Jerry Minnick – 1951, 1952, 1953
- Bill Schabacker – 1951, 1952
- Frank Simon – 1951
- Don Boll – 1952
- Clayton Curtis – 1952
- John Bordogna – 1953
- Ted Connor – 1953
- Charles Bryant – 1954
- Don Glantz – 1954
- Bob Smith – 1954
- Rex Fischer – 1955
- Willie Greenlaw – 1955
- Jon McWilliams – 1955
- LaVerne Torczon – 1955, 1956
- Jerry Brown – 1956
- Don Olson – 1959
- Don Purcell – 1960
- Bill Thornton – 1961
- Bob Brown – 1962, 1963
- Dennis Claridge – 1962, 1963
- Tyrone Robertson – 1962
- Lloyd Voss – 1963
- Walt Barnes, MG – 1964, (Note: The 1963 season was the final college football season to require a one-platoon system. Beginning in 1964, teams were allowed unlimited substitutions to create dedicated offensive, defensive, and special teams units, and the Big Eight began publishing all-conference teams with players listed by position.) 1965
- Tony Jeter, TE – 1964, 1965
- Larry Kramer, OT – 1964
- Kent McCloughan, DB – 1964
- Lyle Sittler, C – 1964
- Ted Vactor, DB – 1964
- Freeman White, SE – 1964, 1965
- LaVerne Allers, OG – 1965, 1966
- Dennis Carlson, OT – 1965
- Mike Kennedy, LB – 1965
- Frank Solich, FB – 1965
- Larry Wachholtz, DB – 1965, 1966
- Kaye Carstens, DB – 1966
- Bob Churchich, QB – 1966
- Wayne Meylan, MG – 1966, 1967
- Kelly Petersen, C – 1966
- Bob Pickens, OT – 1966
- Lynn Senkbeil, LB – 1966
- Carel Stith, DT – 1966
- Harry Wilson, HB – 1966
- Dick Davis, FB – 1967
- Jim McCord, DT – 1967
- Dennis Richnafsky, OE – 1967
- Joe Armstrong, OG – 1968
- Ken Geddes, LB/MG – 1968, 1969
- Dana Stephenson, DB – 1968, 1969
- Bob Liggett, DT – 1969
- Jim McFarland, TE – 1969
- Jerry Murtaugh, LB – 1969, 1970
- Bill Kosch, DB – 1970, 1971
- Donnie McGhee, OG – 1970
- Bob Newton, OT – 1970
- Joe Orduna, IB – 1970
- Ed Periard, MG – 1970
- Johnny Rodgers, HB/WB – 1970, 1971, 1972
- Paul Rogers, K – 1970
- Dave Walline, DT – 1970
- Jim Anderson, DB – 1971
- Joe Blahak, DB – 1971, 1972
- Rich Glover, MG – 1971, 1972
- Willie Harper, DE – 1971, 1972
- Larry Jacobson, DT – 1971
- Carl Johnson, OT – 1971
- Jeff Kinney, IB – 1971
- Dick Rupert, OG – 1971
- Jerry Tagge, QB – 1971
- Bob Terrio, LB – 1971
- Daryl White, OT – 1972, 1973
- Frosty Anderson, SE – 1973
- John Dutton, DT – 1973
- Steve Manstedt, DE – 1973
- Rik Bonness, C – 1974, 1975
- Marvin Crenshaw, OT – 1974
- David Humm, QB – 1974
- Bob Martin, DE – 1974, 1975
- Tom Ruud, LB – 1974
- Dave Butterfield, DB – 1975, 1976
- Mike Fultz, DT – 1975, 1976
- Wonder Monds, DB – 1975
- Vince Ferragamo, QB – 1976
- Bob Lingenfelter, OT – 1976
- Ray Phillips, DE – 1976
- Clete Pillen, LB – 1976
- Dan Schmidt, OG – 1976
- Tom Davis, C – 1977
- I. M. Hipp, IB – 1977
- Greg Jorgensen, OG – 1977
- Jim Pillen, LB – 1977, 1978
- George Andrews, DE – 1978
- Rick Berns, IB – 1978
- Kenny Brown, WB – 1978, 1979
- Kelvin Clark, OT – 1978
- Rod Horn, DT – 1978, 1979
- Steve Lindquist, OG – 1978
- Junior Miller, TE – 1978, 1979
- John Havekost, OG – 1979
- Derrie Nelson, DE – 1979, 1980
- Jarvis Redwine, IB – 1979, 1980
- Dean Sukup, K – 1979
- Kelly Saalfeld, C – 1979
- Tim Smith, SE – 1979
- Kerry Weinmaster, MG – 1979
- David Clark, DT – 1980
- Andra Franklin, FB – 1980
- Russell Gary, S – 1980
- Dave Rimington, C – 1980, 1981, 1982
- Randy Schleusener, OG – 1980
- Roger Craig, IB – 1981
- Tony Felici, DE – 1981, 1982
- Turner Gill, QB – 1981, 1982, 1983
- Dan Hurley, OT – 1981
- Jeff Krejci, S – 1981
- Ric Lindquist, CB – 1981
- Mike Rozier, IB – 1981, 1982, 1983
- Sammy Sims, LB – 1981
- Jamie Williams, TE – 1981, 1982
- Jimmy Williams, DE – 1981
- Steve Damkroger, LB – 1982
- Mike Mandelko, OG – 1982
- Randy Theiss, OT – 1982
- Bret Clark, S – 1983, 1984
- Irving Fryar, WB – 1983
- Mike Knox, LB – 1983
- Scott Raridon, OT – 1983
- Dean Steinkuhler, OG – 1983
- Mark Traynowicz, C – 1983, 1984
- Mark Behning, OT – 1984
- Doug DuBose, IB – 1984, 1985
- Harry Grimminger, OG – 1984
- Scott Livingston, P – 1984
- Marc Munford, LB – 1984, 1985, 1986
- Greg Orton, OG – 1984
- Jeff Smith, IB – 1984
- Scott Strasburger, DE – 1984
- Bill Weber, DE – 1984
- Brian Blankenship, OG – 1985
- Dale Klein, PK – 1985
- Bill Lewis, C – 1985
- Tom Rathman, FB – 1985
- Jim Skow, DT – 1985
- Keith Jones, IB – 1986, 1987
- Danny Noonan, MB – 1986
- Chris Spachman, DT – 1986
- Broderick Thomas, DE/OLB – 1986, 1987, 1988
- Tom Welter, OT – 1986
- LeRoy Etienne, ILB – 1987, 1988
- Steve Forch, ILB – 1987
- Keven Lightner, OT – 1987
- John McCormick, OG – 1987
- Tim Rother, DT – 1987
- Neil Smith, DT – 1987
- Steve Taylor, QB – 1987, 1988
- Dana Brinson – 1988
- Ken Clark, IB – 1988, 1989
- Charles Fryar, CB – 1988
- Willie Griffin, DT – 1988
- Tim Jackson, FS – 1988
- Andy Keeler, OG – 1988
- Todd Millikan, TE – 1988
- Lawrence Pete, MG – 1988
- Bob Sledge, OT – 1988
- Jake Young, C – 1988, 1989
- Reggie Cooper, SS – 1989, 1990
- Gerry Gdowski, QB – 1989
- Doug Glaser, OT – 1989
- Jeff Mills, OLB – 1989
- Bruce Pickens, CB – 1989, 1990
- Pat Tyrance, ILB – 1989, 1990
- Kent Wells, DT – 1989
- Mike Croel, OLB – 1990
- Johnny Mitchell, TE – 1990, 1991
- Tom Punt, OT – 1990
- Will Shields, OG – 1990, 1991, 1992
- Kenny Walker, DT – 1990
- Brian Boerboom, OT – 1991
- Jon Bostick, SE – 1991
- Derek Brown, IB – 1991, 1992
- Tyrone Legette, CB – 1991
- Keithen McCant, QB – 1991
- Mike Stigge, P – 1991
- Erik Wiegert, OG – 1991
- John Parrella, DT – 1991, 1992
- Trev Alberts, OLB – 1992, 1993
- Tyrone Byrd, DB – 1992
- Calvin Jones, IB – 1992, 1993
- Travis Hill, OLB – 1992
- Jim Scott, C – 1992
- Zach Wiegert, OT – 1992, 1993, 1994
- Terry Connealy, DT – 1993
- Lance Lundberg, OT – 1993
- Ken Mehlin, C/OG – 1993
- Barron Miles, CB – 1993, 1994
- Kevin Ramaekers, DT – 1993
- Troy Dumas, LB – 1994
- Aaron Graham, C – 1994, 1995
- Donta Jones, OLB – 1994
- Lawrence Phillips, IB – 1994
- Brenden Stai, OG – 1994
- Ed Stewart, LB – 1994
- Tyrone Williams, CB – 1994, 1995
- Eric Anderson, OT – 1995
- Chris Dishman, OT – 1995
- Terrell Farley, LB – 1995
- Tommie Frazier, QB – 1995
- Ahman Green, IB – 1995
- Christian Peter, DT – 1995
- Aaron Taylor, OG – 1995
- Jared Tomich, OLB – 1995
- Grant Wistrom, OLB – 1995

=== Big 12 ===
- Chris Dishman, OG – 1996
- Jon Hesse, LB – 1996
- Mike Minter, DB – 1996
- Jason Peter, DT – 1996, 1997
- Aaron Taylor, C/OG – 1996, 1997
- Jared Tomich, RE – 1996
- Grant Wistrom, RE – 1996, 1997
- Eric Anderson, OT – 1997
- Ralph Brown, CB – 1997, 1998, 1999
- Ahman Green, IB – 1997
- Josh Heskew, C – 1998
- Sheldon Jackson, TE – 1998
- Mike Brown, DB – 1999
- Eric Crouch, QB – 1999, 2001
- Russ Hochstein, OG – 1999, 2000
- Carlos Polk, MLB – 1999, 2000
- Dominic Raiola, C – 1999, 2000
- Steve Warren, DT – 1999
- Tracey Wistrom, TE – 1999, 2000
- Dan Alexander, IB – 2000
- Dan Hadenfeldt, P – 2000
- Keyuo Craver, CB – 2001
- Dahrran Diedrick, IB – 2001
- Toniu Fonoti, OG – 2001
- Josh Brown, K – 2002
- DeJuan Groce, KR – 2002
- Josh Bullocks, FS – 2003
- Matt Herian, TE – 2003
- Richie Incognito, OT – 2003
- Kyle Larson, P – 2003
- Demorrio Williams, WL – 2003
- Barrett Ruud, MLB – 2004
- Adam Carriker, DE – 2005, 2006
- Brandon Jackson, RB – 2006
- Bo Ruud, LB – 2006
- Zac Taylor, QB – 2006
- Dane Todd, FB – 2006
- Ndamukong Suh, DT – 2008, 2009
- Prince Amukamara, DB – 2009, 2010
- Larry Asante, S – 2009
- Jared Crick, DT – 2009
- Pierre Allen, DE – 2010
- Jared Crick, DT – 2010
- Lavonte David, LB – 2010
- Eric Hagg, DB – 2010
- Ricky Henry, OG – 2010

=== Big Ten ===
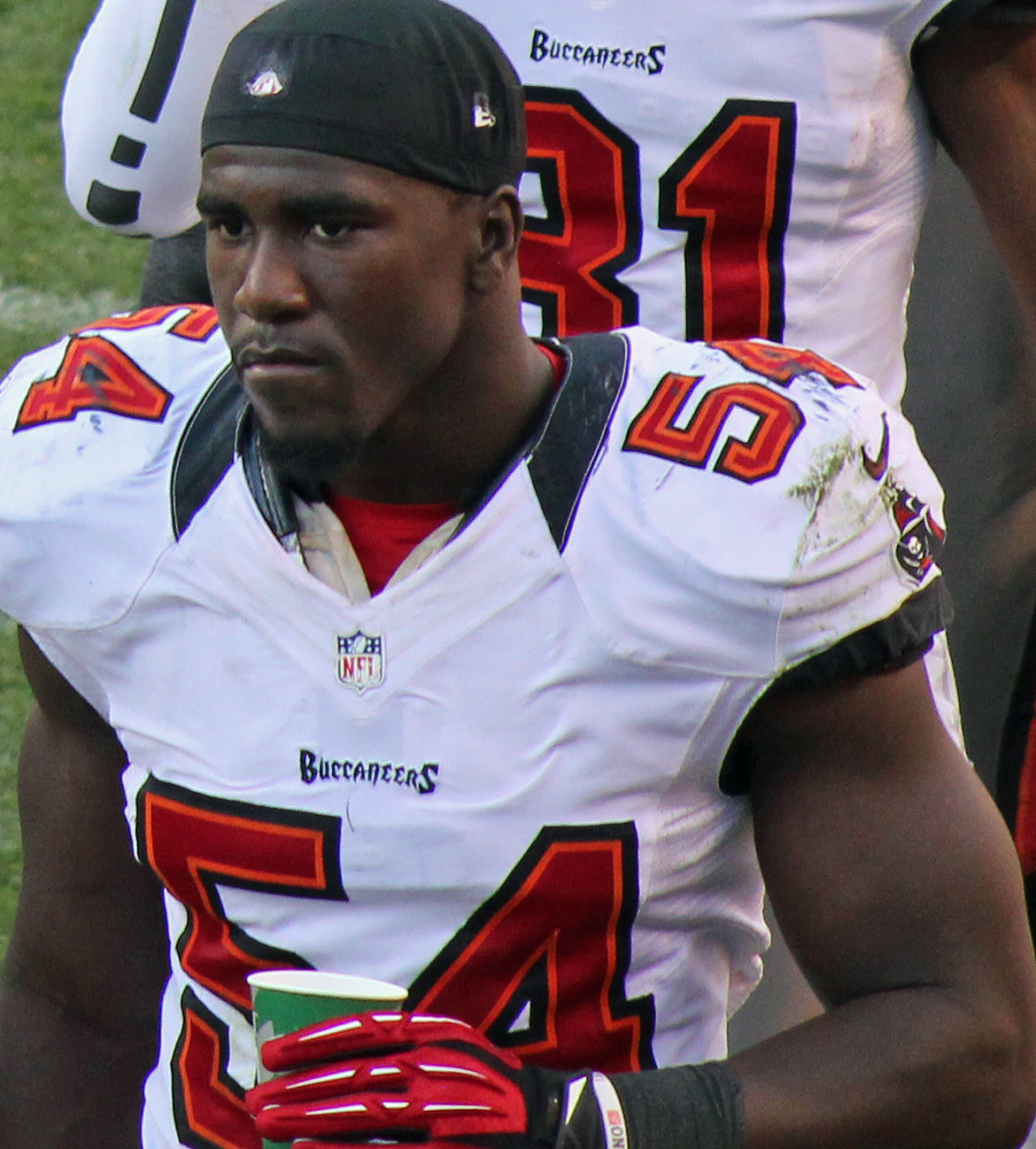
Lavonte David was named Big Ten linebacker of the year in Nebraska's first season in the conference

- Rex Burkhead, RB – 2011
- Lavonte David, LB – 2011
- Alfonzo Dennard, DB – 2011
- Brett Maher, K – 2011, 2012
- Brett Maher, P – 2011
- Spencer Long, OG – 2012
- Eric Martin, DE – 2012
- Taylor Martinez, QB – 2012
- Daimion Stafford, S – 2012
- Ameer Abdullah, RB – 2013
- Ciante Evans, CB – 2013
- Randy Gregory, DE – 2013, 2014
- Kenny Bell, WR – 2014
- Sam Foltz, P – 2015
- Connor Culp, K – 2020
- Austin Allen, TE – 2021
- Emmett Johnson - 2025

== Retired numbers and jerseys ==
Nebraska has permanently retired the number of two players: Tom Novak, the only four-time all-conference selection in Nebraska history; and Bob Brown, the first All-American coached by Bob Devaney. Novak's no. 60 and Brown's no. 64 have not been worn since being retired. (Note: Novak also wore no. 68 and no. 61 during his career, which are not retired. Brown's no. 64 was worn by many players prior to its retirement in 2004, most recently by offensive lineman Kurt Mann.)

Nebraska has retired the jersey of twenty-three other players, allowing the numbers to remain in circulation. The name and number of each honoree is displayed below the North Stadium press box at Memorial Stadium. Each major award winner has his jersey retired, typically in an on-field ceremony following the end of his collegiate career. In 2017, the school recognized eight early College Football Hall of Fame inductees, including Guy Chamberlin, whose career predated the use of numbers on jerseys.

No.	Player	Position	Career	Retired (Note: The year the player's jersey or number was retired by the university.)
Retired numbers
60	Tom Novak	C	1946–1949	1949
64	Bob Brown	OT	1961–1963	2004
Retired jerseys
1	Clarence Swanson	E	1918–1921	2017
7	Eric Crouch	QB	1998–2001	2002
12	Bobby Reynolds	HB	1950–1952	2017
15	Tommie Frazier	QB	1992–1995	1996
20	Johnny Rodgers	WB	1970–1972	1972
25	George Sauer	FB	1931–1933	2017
30	Mike Rozier	IB	1981–1983	1983
33	Forrest Behm	OT	1938–1940	2017
34	Trev Alberts	LB	1990–1993	1994
35	Ed Weir	OT	1923–1925	2017
38	Sam Francis	FB	1934–1936	2017
50	Dave Rimington	C	1979–1982	1982
54	Dominic Raiola	C	1998–2000	2002
66	Wayne Meylan	MG	1965–1967	2017
67	Aaron Taylor	OG	1994–1997	1998
71	Dean Steinkuhler	OG	1980–1983	1983
72	Zach Wiegert	OT	1991–1994	1995
75	Larry Jacobson	DT	1969–1971	1994
75	Will Shields	OG	1989–1992	1994
79	Rich Glover	MG	1970–1972	1972
93	Ndamukong Suh	DT	2005–2009	2010
98	Grant Wistrom	DE	1994–1997	1998
	Guy Chamberlin	E	1913–1915	2017
