= 1971 Nebraska Cornhuskers football team =

American college football season

1971 Nebraska Cornhuskers football

Consensus national champion Big Eight champion Orange Bowl champion

Orange Bowl, W 38–6 vs. Alabama
- Conference: Big Eight Conference

Ranking
- Coaches: No. 1
- AP: No. 1
- Record: 13–0 (7–0 Big 8)
- Head coach: Bob Devaney (10th season)
- Offensive coordinator: Tom Osborne (3rd season)
- Offensive scheme: I formation
- Defensive coordinator: Monte Kiffin (3rd season)
- Base defense: 5–2
- Home stadium: Memorial Stadium

1971 Big Eight Conference football standings
	Conf.					Overall
Team	W		L		T	W		L		T
No. 1 Nebraska $	7	–	0	–	0	13	–	0	–	0
No. 2 Oklahoma	6	–	1	–	0	11	–	1	–	0
No. 3 Colorado	5	–	2	–	0	10	–	2	–	0
Iowa State	4	–	3	–	0	8	–	4	–	0
Kansas State	2	–	5	–	0	5	–	6	–	0
Oklahoma State	2	–	5	–	0	4	–	6	–	1
Kansas	2	–	5	–	0	4	–	7	–	0
Missouri	0	–	7	–	0	1	–	10	–	0
$ – Conference champion; Rankings from AP Poll

The 1971 Nebraska Cornhuskers football team represented the University of Nebraska in the Big Eight Conference during the 1971 NCAA University Division football season. The Cornhuskers were led by tenth-year head coach Bob Devaney and played their home games at Memorial Stadium in Lincoln.

The Cornhuskers finished the season undefeated at 13–0, repeating as national champions. They outscored their 13 opponents 507 to 104, held ten of them to single-digit points or fewer (including three shutouts), and famously defeated second-ranked Oklahoma on the road in a game that has been referred to as the "Game of the Century". In the years since, the 1971 Nebraska team has been cited by some sports pundits as the greatest in college football history.

The 1971 Cornhuskers were one of the most dominant teams in college football history, winning twelve of their thirteen games by 24 points (or more) and defeating the next three teams in the final AP poll. The sole close game of the season was the Game of the Century at No. 2 Oklahoma on Thanksgiving. Nebraska decisively beat No. 3 Colorado (then No. 9) 31–7 in Lincoln and No. 4 Alabama (then No. 2) 38–6 in the Orange Bowl in Miami, capturing the consensus national championship.

== Schedule ==
Date	Time	Opponent	Rank	Site	TV	Result	Attendance	Source
September 11	1:30 pm	Oregon*	No. 2	Memorial Stadium; Lincoln, NE		W 34–7	67,437	
September 18	1:30 pm	Minnesota*	No. 1	Memorial Stadium; Lincoln, NE (rivalry)		W 35–7	68,187	
September 25	1:30 pm	Texas A&M*	No. 1	Memorial Stadium; Lincoln, NE		W 34–7	67,993	
October 2	1:30 pm	Utah State*	No. 1	Memorial Stadium; Lincoln, NE		W 42–6	67,421	
October 9	1:30 pm	at Missouri	No. 1	Memorial Stadium; Columbia, MO (rivalry)		W 36–0	61,200	
October 16	1:30 pm	Kansas^{†}	No. 1	Memorial Stadium; Lincoln, NE (rivalry)		W 55–0	68,331	
October 23	1:30 pm	at Oklahoma State	No. 1	Lewis Field; Stillwater, OK		W 41–13	37,000	
October 30	12:50 pm	No. 9 Colorado	No. 1	Memorial Stadium; Lincoln, NE (rivalry)	ABC	W 31–7	66,776	
November 6	1:30 pm	Iowa State	No. 1	Memorial Stadium; Lincoln, NE (rivalry)		W 37–0	67,201	
November 13	1:30 pm	at Kansas State	No. 1	KSU Stadium; Manhattan, KS (rivalry)		W 44–17	42,300	
November 25	1:50 pm	at No. 2 Oklahoma	No. 1	Oklahoma Memorial Stadium; Norman, OK (Game of the Century, rivalry)	ABC	W 35–31	61,826	
December 4	12:00 am	at Hawaii*	No. 1	Honolulu Stadium; Honolulu, HI		W 45–3	23,002	
January 1, 1972	7:00 pm	vs. No. 2 Alabama*	No. 1	Miami Orange Bowl; Miami, FL (Orange Bowl)	NBC	W 38–6	73,151	
*Non-conference game; ^{†}Homecoming; Rankings from AP Poll released prior to the game; All times are in Central time; Source:

== Roster ==
Adkins, John #57 (Sr.) DE; Anderson, Dan #67 (So.) RG; Anderson, Frosty #89 (So.) SE; Anderson, Jim #18 (Sr.) RCB; Austin, Al #78 (So.) RT; Bell, John #31 (Jr.) MG; Beran, Mike #62 (Jr.) RG; Blahak, Joe #27 (Jr.) LCB; Borg, Randy #19 (So.) RCB; Branch, Jim #51 (Jr.) LB; Brownson, Van #12 (Sr.) QB; Butts, Randy #36 (So.) HB; Carstens, Jim #47 (Jr.) FB; Coleman, Ron #9 (So.) QB; Cox, Woody #32 (Sr.) SE; Crenshaw, Marvin #70 (So.) RT; Damkroger, Maury #46 (So.) FB; Deyke, Tom #94 (So.) DT; Didur, Dale #84 (Sr.) SE; Dixon, Gary #22 (Jr.) HB; Doak, Mark #93 (So.) NT; Duffy, Joe #52 (So.) LG; Dumler, Doug #54 (Jr.) C Dutton, John #90 (So.) DT; Fuller, Bruce #8 (So.) S Garson, Glen #39 (So.) HB; Glover, Rich #79 (Jr.) MG; Goeller, Dave #28 (So.) HB; Guibord, Greg #87 (So.) DE; Harper, Willie #81 (Jr.) DE	Harvey, Phil #82 (Sr.) TE; Hauge, Bruce #48 (Jr.) LB; Hegener, Stan #92 (So.) LT; Henderson, Joe #63 (So.) RG; Henrichs, Dennis #96 (So.) LG; Hill, Jeff #98 (So.) SE; Hollstein, Gary #29 (Sr.) LCB; Hughes, Jeff #26 (Sr.) HB; Humm, Dave #10 (So.) QB; Hunter, Ken #78 (Jr.) MG; Hyland, John #58 (Jr.) DE; Jacobson, Larry #75 (Sr.) DT; Jamail, Doug #50 (Jr.) C Janssen, Bill #55 (Jr.) DT; Johnson, Carl #71 (Sr.) RT; Johnson, Doug #64 (Jr.) DE; Johnson, Monte #37 (Jr.) MG; Kinney, Jeff #35 (Sr.) HB; Kinsel, John #53 (Jr.) C Kosch, Bill #24 (Sr.) S Lackovic, Tim #80 (So.) SE; Linder, Max #88 (So.) SE; List, Jerry #85 (Jr.) TE; Longwell, Brent #86 (So.) TE; Lynch, Dan #73 (So.) DT; Manstedt, Steve #11 (So.) DE; Mason, Dave #25 (Jr.) MON; McClelland, Tom #16 (Sr.) S McKinley, Kim #69 (So.) DT; Moran, Jeff #30 (So.) HB; Morell, Pat #40 (Sr.) LB	Nelson, Chris #99 (So.) TE; O'Connell, John #34 (So.) S O'Holleran, Mike #38 (So.) HB; Olds, Bill #44 (Jr.) FB; Pabis, Bob #66 (Sr.) MG; Peetz, Mike #33 (So.) MON; Peterson, John (Unk) MG; Pitts, John #56 (Jr.) MON; Powell, Ralph #41 (So.) FB; Righetti, Phil #74 (Jr.) LT; Robison, Tom #68 (So.) DT; Rodgers, Johnny #20 (Jr.) HB; Runty, Steve #13 (So.) QB; Rupert, Dick #77 (Sr.) LG; Sanger, Rich #43 (So.) LB; Schmit, Bob #23 (So.) HB; Sloey, Bill #42 (Jr.) LB; Starkebaum, John #15 (So.) MON; Strong, Jon #49 (So.) LB; Tagge, Jerry #14 (Sr.) QB; Terrio, Bob #45 (Sr.) LB; Thornton, Bob #17 (Jr.) RCB; Weber, Bruce #61 (Sr.) LG; Westbrook, Don #21 (So.) HB; White, Daryl #72 (So.) LT; Wieser, Steve #83 (So.) DE; Wolfe, Bob #76 (So.) LT; Wortman, Keith #65 (Sr.) RG; Zanrosso, Dennis #59 (So.) C

Defense

FS
Bill Kosch
Tom McClelland
John O'Connell

INSDIE	INSDIE
Bob Terrio	Jim Branch
Pat Morell	Bruce Hague
Rich Sanger	Jon Strong

MONSTER BACK
Dave Mason
John Pitts
Charles Harris

CB
Joe Blahak
Garry Hollstein
Pat Fischer

DE	DT	NT	DT	DE
Willie Harper	Bill Janssen	Rich Glover	Larry Jacobson	John Adkins
Steve Manstedt	John Peterson	Monte Johnson	John Dutton	John Hyland
Tom Pate	Dan Lynch	John Peterson	Tom Robison	Steve Wieser

CB
Jim Anderson
Randy Borg
Bob Thornton

Offense

SE
Woody Cox
Frosty Anderson
Dale Didur

LT	LG	C	RG	RT
Daryl White	Dick Rupert	Doug Dumler	Keith Wortman	Carl Johnson
Bob Wolfe	Bruce Weber	Doug Jamail	Mike Beran	Al Austin
Phil Righetti	Joe Duffy	Dennis Zanrosso	Tom Alward	Marvin Crenshaw

TE
Jerry List
Brent Longwell
Phil Harvey

WB
Johnny Rodgers
Glen Garson
Jeff Hughes

QB
Jerry Tagge
Van Brownson
Dave Humm

Key reserves

FB
Bill Olds
Maury Damkroger
Jim Carstens

Special teams

RB
Jeff Kinney
Gary Dixon
Dave Goeller

== Coaching staff ==
Name	Title	First year in this position	Years at Nebraska	Alma mater
Bob Devaney	Head Coach	1962	1962–72	Alma
Tom Osborne	Offensive coordinator	1969	1964–97	Hastings
Cletus Fischer	Offensive Line		1960–85	Nebraska
Carl Selmer	Offensive Line		1962–72	
Jim Ross			1962–76	
John Melton	Tight Ends, Wingbacks	1973	1962–88	Wyoming
Mike Corgan	Running Backs	1962	1962–82	Notre Dame
Monte Kiffin	Defensive coordinator	1969	1967–76	Nebraska
Warren Powers	Defensive Backs		1969–76	Nebraska
Boyd Epley	Head Strength Coach	1969	1969–2003	Nebraska
Bill Thornton			1969–72	Nebraska
Jim Walden			1971–72	Wyoming

== Game summaries ==
=== Oregon ===
Oregon at #2 Nebraska [box score]

Team	1	2	3	4	Total
Oregon	0	0	0	7	7
• #2 Nebraska	7	7	7	13	34

- Date: 1971-09-11
- Location: Memorial Stadium, Lincoln, Nebraska
- Game attendance: 67,437

The Nebraska reserves were on the field in the 4th quarter, working under a comfortable 34–0 lead, when a fumbled punt allowed Oregon to put in a late score to avoid the shutout with 3 minutes to play.

The Blackshirt Defense stymied the Ducks' highly-touted passing attack of Dan Fouts to Bobby Moore, who changed his name to Ahmad Rashad in 1973.

Two days later, Nebraska vaulted Notre Dame for the No. 1 spot in the polls and never relinquished it.

=== Minnesota ===
Minnesota at #1 Nebraska [box score]

Team	1	2	3	4	Total
Minnesota	0	7	0	0	7
• #1 Nebraska	14	7	14	0	35

- Date: 1971-09-18
- Location: Memorial Stadium, Lincoln, Nebraska
- Game attendance: 68,187

Minnesota managed a 2nd-quarter touchdown, but the game was never really in doubt as Nebraska extended their unbeaten streak to 21 games in what would be Golden Gopher coach Murray Warmath's last meeting vs. the Cornhuskers.

=== Texas A&M ===
Texas A&M at #1 Nebraska [box score]

Team	1	2	3	4	Total
Texas A&M	0	0	0	7	7
• #1 Nebraska	7	6	14	7	34

- Date: 1971-09-25
- Location: Memorial Stadium, Lincoln, Nebraska
- Game attendance: 67,993

Two huge plays left Nebraska's signature on the Texas A&M win, as Johnny Rodgers tore off a 98-yard kickoff return for a touchdown, and Bill Kosch returned an interception 95 yards for a score of his own. The Aggies also managed a big score for their only points, an equally-impressive 94-yard kickoff return touchdown.

=== Utah State ===
Utah State at #1 Nebraska [box score]

Team	1	2	3	4	Total
Utah State	0	0	6	0	6
• #1 Nebraska	14	7	14	7	42

- Date: 1971-10-02
- Location: Memorial Stadium, Lincoln, Nebraska
- Game attendance: 67,421

Utah State was behind 0–35 when they managed to avoid the shutout with a 3rd-quarter touchdown, but the PAT was blocked. The Cornhuskers ran the margin of victory back up again with a final fourth-quarter touchdown.

=== Missouri ===
#1 Nebraska at Missouri [box score]

Team	1	2	3	4	Total
• #1 Nebraska	0	16	14	6	36
Missouri	0	0	0	0	0

- Date: 1971-10-09
- Location: Memorial Stadium, Columbia, Missouri
- Game attendance: 61,200

Nebraska was held scoreless for over 20 minutes, but Missouri, on its way to a 1–10 season under first-year coach Al Onofrio, eventually succumbed to the pressure as Nebraska then ran up 36 points and shut out the Tigers in Columbia.

=== Kansas ===
Kansas at #1 Nebraska [box score]

Team	1	2	3	4	Total
Kansas	0	0	0	0	0
• #1 Nebraska	14	14	13	14	55

- Date: 1971-10-16
- Location: Memorial Stadium, Lincoln, Nebraska
- Game attendance: 68,331

Nebraska smashed Kansas at Homecoming for another shutout, holding the Jayhawks, whose offense was left barren following the graduation of John Riggins, to 56 yards, barely more than one tenth of the Cornhuskers' 538 yards.

=== Oklahoma State ===
#1 Nebraska at Oklahoma State [box score]

Team	1	2	3	4	Total
• #1 Nebraska	7	14	13	7	41
Oklahoma State	0	0	0	13	13

- Date: 1971-10-23
- Location: Lewis Field, Stillwater, Oklahoma
- Game attendance: 37,000

All of Oklahoma State's entire scoring was picked up in the last 2 minutes against Nebraska reserves, making the game appear closer than it was, if 41–13 can be called close.

The Cowboys' Floyd Gass was the fourth coach to oppose the 1971 Cornhuskers who would not be in the same position in 1972. The others were Jerry Frei (Oregon), Murray Warmath (Minnesota) and Gene Stallings (Texas A&M).

=== Colorado ===
#9 Colorado at #1 Nebraska [box score]

Team	1	2	3	4	Total
#9 Colorado	0	0	7	0	7
• #1 Nebraska	7	17	7	0	31

- Date: 1971-10-30
- Location: Memorial Stadium, Lincoln, Nebraska
- Game attendance: 66,776

Nebraska rolled right out to a 24–0 lead by halftime and was cruising against #9 Colorado, which previously won in hostile environments at LSU and Ohio State, without much effort. The Buffaloes did manage a 3rd-quarter touchdown on a broken play, but Nebraska matched it and easily held on for the win.

=== Iowa State ===
Iowa State at #1 Nebraska [box score]

Team	1	2	3	4	Total
Iowa State	0	0	0	0	0
• #1 Nebraska	10	10	7	10	37

- Date: 1971-11-06
- Location: Memorial Stadium, Lincoln, Nebraska
- Game attendance: 67,201

The Cornhuskers held Iowa State to just 105 yards of offense and had no trouble holding the Sun Bowl-bound Cyclones off the scoreboard for another shutout.

=== Kansas State ===
#1 Nebraska at Kansas State [box score]

Team	1	2	3	4	Total
• #1 Nebraska	14	16	7	7	44
Kansas State	0	9	0	8	17

- Date: 1971-11-13
- Location: KSU Stadium, Manhattan, Kansas
- Game attendance: 42,300

Nebraska QB Jerry Tagge became the first Cornhusker to exceed 5000 career yards at Kansas State as Nebraska scored touchdowns on each of its first four possessions. Johnny Rodgers also entered the record book with his 10-season touchdown receptions, 45 receptions on the season, and 84 receptions for his career. No other team managed to score so many points on Nebraska this season as did the Wildcats, but another convincing win was behind them as Nebraska prepared for a showdown with #2 Oklahoma (which decimated K-State's defense for 75 points three weeks earlier) to decide the Big 8 title and potentially the national championship.

=== Oklahoma ===
#1 Nebraska at #2 Oklahoma [box score]

Team	1	2	3	4	Total
• #1 Nebraska	7	7	14	7	35
#2 Oklahoma	3	14	7	7	31

- Date: 1971-11-25
- Location: Owen Field, Norman, Oklahoma
- Game start: 1:50 pm CST
- Game attendance: 61,826
- Referee: Vance Carlson
- TV announcers (ABC): Chris Schenkel, Bud Wilkinson
  and Bill Flemming (sideline)

Oklahoma and Nebraska battled back and forth in the Game of the Century in front of a sold-out crowd in Norman and over 55 million viewers on ABC-TV on Thanksgiving Day. Nebraska struck first with a 72-yard Johnny Rodgers punt return, but Oklahoma pulled ahead by 3 by halftime. The Cornhuskers came back strong in the third quarter with two more touchdowns, but the Sooners responded with two of their own to retake the lead with only 7:10 remaining. Down by 3 points, the Huskers went on a final drive and with only 1:38 remaining, Jeff Kinney scored his fourth touchdown of the day for the lead and the win.

=== Hawaii ===
#1 Nebraska at Hawaii [box score]

Team	1	2	3	4	Total
• #1 Nebraska	17	7	7	14	45
Hawaii	0	3	0	0	3

- Date: 1971-12-04
- Location: Honolulu Stadium, Honolulu, Hawaii
- Game start: 7:00 p.m.
- Game attendance: 23,002

Almost 1/3 of the fans in the relatively sparse crowd were dressed in red and rooting for the Cornhuskers, as Nebraska handily won this game almost as an afterthought to the vacation in Honolulu. It was 24–3 at the half, and Hawaii never saw the scoreboard again.

The victory wrapped up the UPI coaches poll national championship for the Cornhuskers. The UPI did not conduct a post-bowl poll until 1974.

=== Alabama ===
#2 Alabama vs #1 Nebraska [box score]

Team	1	2	3	4	Total
#2 Alabama	0	0	6	0	6
• #1 Nebraska	14	14	3	7	38

- Date: 1972-01-01
- Location: Orange Bowl, Miami, Florida
- Game start: 8:30 pm EST
- Game attendance: 73,151
- Referee: R. Pete Williams
- TV announcers (NBC): Jim Simpson and Kyle Rote

In the 1972 Orange Bowl, the Huskers battled a #2 team for the second time this season, but Alabama hardly posed the challenge that the Oklahoma Sooners had been, as Nebraska sent the Crimson Tide to the locker room at the half trailing by an embarrassing 28–0.

Alabama managed a feeble third-quarter touchdown but failed in the following 2-point conversion and never scored again, while Nebraska responded with 10 more points of their own to close the game and ended the season as national champions for the second consecutive year and exact revenge for losses to Alabama in the 1966 Orange Bowl and 1967 Sugar Bowl.

== Rankings ==
Ranking movements Legend: ██ Increase in ranking ██ Decrease in ranking
	Week														
Poll	Pre	1	2	3	4	5	6	7	8	9	10	11	12	13	Final
AP	2	1	1	1	1	1	1	1	1	1	1	1	1	1	1
Coaches															1

=== Awards ===
Award	Name(s)
National; Coach of the Year	Bob Devaney
NCAA District 6 Coach of the Year	Bob Devaney
Outland Trophy	Larry Jacobson
All-America 1st team	Rich Glover, Willie Harper, Larry Jacobson, Jeff Kinney, Johnny Rodgers, Jerry Tagge
All-America 2nd team	Dick Rupert
All-America 3rd team	Carl Johnson
All-America honorable mention	Doug Dumler, Bill Kosch
All-America Sophomore	Daryl White
Big Eight Defensive; Player of the Year	Rich Glover
All-Big Eight; 1st team	Jim Anderson, Joe Blahak, Rich Glover, Willie Harper, Larry Jacobson, Carl Johnson, Jeff Kinney, Bill Kosch, Johnny Rodgers, Dick Rupert, Jerry Tagge, Bob Terrio
All-Big Eight; 2nd team	Doug Dumler, Dave Mason
All-Big Eight honorable mention	John Adkins, Bill Janssen, Jerry List, Daryl White, Keith Wortman

Jerry Tagge finished seventh in the Heisman Trophy balloting in 1971,
teammate Johnny Rodgers would win in 1972.

== 1971 team players in the NFL ==
The 1971 Nebraska Cornhuskers seniors selected in the 1972 NFL draft:

Player	Position	Round	Pick	Franchise
Jerry Tagge	QB	1	11	Green Bay Packers
Jeff Kinney	RB	1	23	Kansas City Chiefs
Larry Jacobson	DT	1	24	New York Giants
Carl Johnson	T	5	112	New Orleans Saints
Van Brownson	QB	8	204	Baltimore Colts
Keith Wortman	G	10	242	Green Bay Packers

The 1971 Nebraska Cornhuskers juniors selected in the following year's 1973 NFL draft:

Player	Position	Round	Pick	Franchise
Johnny Rodgers	WR	1	25	San Diego Chargers
Willie Harper	LB	2	41	San Francisco 49ers
Monte Johnson	LB	2	49	Oakland Raiders
Bill Olds	RB	3	61	Baltimore Colts
Rich Glover	DT	3	69	New York Giants
Doug Dumler	C	5	108	New England Patriots
Joe Blahak	DB	8	183	Houston Oilers
Bill Janssen	T	8	206	Pittsburgh Steelers
Dave Mason	DB	10	246	Minnesota Vikings
Jerry List	TE	11	283	Oakland Raiders

The 1971 Nebraska Cornhuskers sophomores selected in the 1974 NFL draft:

Player	Position	Round	Pick	Franchise
John Dutton	DE	1	5	Baltimore Colts
Steve Manstedt	LB	4	79	Houston Oilers
Daryl White	G	4	98	Cincinnati Bengals
Bob Wolfe	T	6	156	Miami Dolphins
Maury Damkroger	LB	7	178	New England Patriots
Frosty Anderson	WR	10	235	New Orleans Saints

=== NFL and pro players ===
The following is a list of 1971 Nebraska players who joined a professional team as draftees or free agents.

Name	Team
Joe Blahak	Houston Oilers
Gary Dixon	Southern California Sun
Mark Doak	Birmingham Vulcans
Maury Damkroger	New England Patriots
Doug Dumler	New England Patriots
John Dutton	Baltimore Colts
Rich Glover	New York Giants
Willie Harper	San Francisco 49ers
Dave Humm	Oakland Raiders
Larry Jacobson	New York Giants
Bill Janssen	Charlotte Hornets
Carl Johnson	New Orleans Saints
Monte Johnson	Oakland Raiders
Jeff Kinney	Kansas City Chiefs
Brent Longwell	Memphis Southmen
Steve Manstedt	Birmingham Americans
Dave Mason	New England Patriots
Bill Olds	Baltimore Colts
Johnny Rodgers	Montreal Alouettes
Bob Schmit	Portland Storm
Jerry Tagge	Green Bay Packers
Don Westbrook	New England Patriots
Daryl White	Detroit Lions
Bob Wolfe	Birmingham Americans
Keith Wortman	Green Bay Packers
