= Tommie Frazier =

American gridiron football player and coach (born 1974)

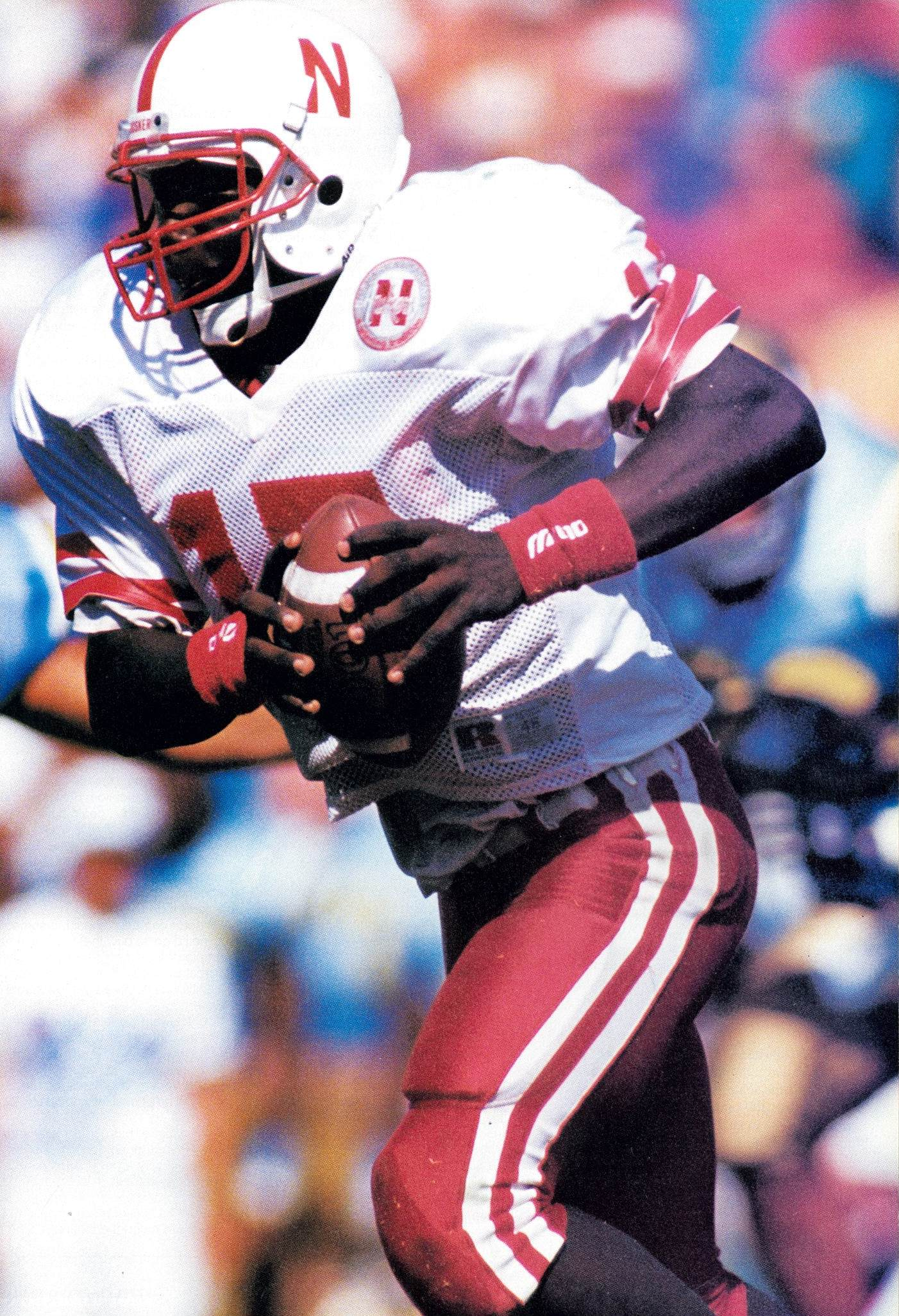
- Frazier with the Nebraska Cornhuskers in 1993

No. 15
- Position: Quarterback

Personal information
- Born: July 16, 1974 (age 52); Bradenton, Florida, U.S.
- Listed height: 6 ft 0 in (1.83 m)
- Listed weight: 210 lb (95 kg)

Career information
- High school: Manatee (Bradenton)
- College: Nebraska (1992–1995)
- NFL draft: 1996: undrafted

Career history

Playing
- Montreal Alouettes (1996)

Coaching
- Baylor (1999) Graduate assistant; Baylor (2000–2002) Running backs assistant coach; Doane (2005–2006) Head coach

Awards and highlights
- 2× National champion (1994, 1995); Fiesta Bowl MVP (1996); 2× Orange Bowl MVP (1994, 1995); Johnny Unitas Golden Arm Award (1995); Quarterback of the Year (1995); Consensus All-American (1995); Big Eight Offensive Player of the Year (1995); First-team All-Big Eight (1995); Second-team All-Big Eight (1993); Big Eight Freshman of the Year (1992); Nebraska Cornhuskers Jersey No. 15 retired
- College Football Hall of Fame

Tommie James Frazier Jr. (born July 16, 1974) is an American former college football player who was a quarterback for the Nebraska Cornhuskers. He earned consensus All-American honors in 1995.

Frazier led his team to consecutive national championships in 1994 and 1995, and is one of six quarterbacks to have done so since the 1950s: Oklahoma's Steve Davis, Nebraska's Jerry Tagge, USC's Matt Leinart, Alabama's A. J. McCarron and Georgia's Stetson Bennett being the others. He was named Most Valuable Player of three consecutive national championship games, the only player ever to accomplish that feat. The 1995 Nebraska football team is considered to have been one of the most dominant in the history of American college football and, in a 2006 ESPN.com poll, was voted the best college football team of all time.

Frazier was selected by Sports Illustrated in 1999 as a back-up quarterback in their "NCAA Football All-Century Team." He was one of six Nebraska Cornhuskers on this 85 man roster, along with Johnny Rodgers, Rich Glover, Dave Rimington, Dean Steinkuhler and Aaron Taylor. In 2013, Frazier was elected to the College Football Hall of Fame.

Frazier was not drafted by the NFL due to a blood clot in his left leg, a side effect of Crohn's disease. He played professionally for one season with the Montreal Alouettes of the Canadian Football League (CFL). He became a coach after his playing career.

== Personal life ==
Frazier grew up in Palmetto, Florida, and attended Manatee High School. He was an option quarterback at Manatee High School who in his final two seasons ran for 1,600 yards and 33 touchdowns, and passed for 2,600 yards and 30 touchdowns.

He is married to Andrea Stephens Frazier, originally from Sioux Falls, South Dakota. The couple has a son and a daughter.

Frazier is a member of Iota Phi Theta fraternity. He was the host of Tommie Frazier's X's and O's and of The Husker Express Radio Show with Tommie Frazier, which aired on ESPN 590 AM in Omaha, Nebraska.

== Collegiate playing career ==
=== 1992 season ===
Frazier received an athletic scholarship to attend the University of Nebraska–Lincoln and play for the Nebraska Cornhuskers football team. After several years in which the Cornhuskers had suffered blowout losses in bowl games, frequently in Orange Bowl matchups against the University of Miami Hurricanes and the Florida State Seminoles, head coach Tom Osborne changed his recruiting strategy in the early 1990s and began to recruit faster players at all positions. Osborne reportedly shed tears upon receiving the news of Frazier's decision to accept a scholarship from Nebraska. Frazier, rated as the No. 3 college recruit in the country by analyst Tom Lemming, led Nebraska to four consecutive New Year's Day bowl games.

Frazier joined the Nebraska football team as an 18-year-old true freshman in the summer of 1992, at 6–1 and 190 pounds, and began as a backup to senior Mike Grant. Nebraska started the season with a 4–1 record under Grant, but an early 29–14 loss to the second-ranked Washington Huskies set up Frazier's opportunity to take over as the starting quarterback. He did so at Missouri on October 24, a 34–24 Nebraska victory. Frazier gained national recognition with the following two games, both blowout wins broadcast nationally in evening time slots on ESPN. He led the team on Halloween to a 52–7 win against a powerful Colorado team that carried a 9–1–1 record and was led by quarterback Kordell Stewart. Frazier threw sparingly, completing 4 of 12 passes for 55 yards and two touchdowns, but rushed 16 times for 86 of Nebraska's 373 rushing yards. Frazier's arm was showcased the following week, November 7, in a 49–7 win over Kansas. Play-action fakes resulted in long touchdown passes of 36 and 46 yards, and Frazier finished the game with 6 of 11 passes completed, for 161 yards and three touchdowns.

Nebraska finished the season with a 9–3 record, and Frazier registered seven starts at quarterback. He played well in the FedEx Orange Bowl on January 1, 1993, against an 11–1 Florida State team led by quarterback Charlie Ward, wide receiver Tamarick Vanover, and linebacker Marvin Jones. Florida State took an early 20–0 lead, but Frazier, who started the game in a shotgun formation, responded with a 41-yard touchdown pass to Corey Dixon and a red zone touchdown pass to Gerald Armstrong. The Seminoles won the game, 27–14.

Frazier played in nine games during the 1992 regular season, and completed 44 of 100 passes for 727 yards and only one interception. He rushed for 399 yards, and scored 17 touchdowns, rushing and passing. His longest run was 52 yards, against Iowa State on November 14.

=== 1993 season ===
Frazier helped the Cornhuskers to edge past UCLA 14–13 on September 18 in what appeared to be a pivotal win that season. He completed 13-of-19 passes for 145 yards and an 11-yard touchdown pass in a 14–13 victory over the Bruins, who had the Pac-10's top pass defense. This enabled Nebraska to achieve an undefeated record during the regular season in 1993. Frazier rushed for over 1,000 yards through the regular- and post-season, though the official total is lower due to negative yardage from sacks. He rushed for nine touchdowns, with a longest run of 58 yards, and completed 77 of 162 passes for 12 touchdowns, four interceptions and 1,159 yards in 11 games. His longest pass play of the season was a 60-yard touchdown to wingback Corey Dixon on October 30 against the Colorado Buffaloes.

The FedEx Orange Bowl game played on January 1, 1994, featured a rematch between Nebraska and Florida State. Frazier, now a sophomore, was pitted against newly crowned Heisman Trophy winner Charlie Ward. A last minute drive by Ward led to a Seminoles field goal that prevented the Cornhuskers from winning the national title. Frazier's 29-yard pass to split end Trumaine Bell positioned Nebraska for a potentially game-winning 45-yard field goal attempt with 0:01 left on the game clock, but the kick sailed wide left, and Florida State won 18–16. Frazier was named Most Valuable Player of the national title game despite the loss, completing 13 of 24 passes for 206 yards and a 34-yard touchdown, and rushing 14 times for 77 yards with a 32-yard run. The Cornhuskers finished the season with an 11–1 record.

=== 1994 season ===
Frazier earned consideration as a Heisman Trophy candidate in the first half of the 1994 season, but missed the second half due to a blood clot in his leg. He gave an explosive performance against West Virginia on August 28, in which he completed 8 of 16 passes for 100 yards and ran 12 times for 130 yards, and scored on an 11-yard touchdown pass and runs of 25, 27, and 42 yards in a 31–0 Nebraska victory. His last game of the regular season was on September 24, when he began to experience difficulties in his right calf as the result of blood clotting. Nebraska beat Pacific 70–21, but Frazier played sparingly, and attempted only two passes, with one 26-yard completion.

Dropback passer Brook Berringer led the team back to the FedEx Orange Bowl with a 12–0 record, where the Cornhuskers faced the third-ranked Miami Hurricanes in the de facto national championship game. Frazier started the game, but was replaced by Berringer after a deep throw to the end zone on Nebraska's initial drive resulted in a turnover. The Hurricanes gained the momentum, and led by 17–7 early in the 3rd quarter. With seven minutes left in the game and the team trailing 17–9, Osborne placed Frazier back in the lineup. Frazier led two touchdown drives that gave Nebraska a 24–17 victory. Nebraska's option plays tired the Miami defenders, and Frazier's fake of the option play enabled fullback Cory Schlesinger to score on 15 and 14 yard runs. The Cornhuskers celebrated their first national title since 1971, and the first of coach Osborne's career. Frazier was again named MVP, as despite the three-month layoff he completed 3 of 5 passes for 25 yards, and ran seven times for 31 yards, including a 25-yard option keeper.

=== 1995 season ===
Frazier was back to health in 1995, and led the Cornhuskers through another undefeated campaign. He had a strong arm, though not a particularly accurate one, but by his senior year had improved his passing to the point that he completed 56.4 percent of his passes and had an efficiency rating of 156.1, along with 17 touchdowns. His best passing performance of the season came in a 44–21 victory on October 28, in which he had 14 completions in 23 attempts against a 10–2 Colorado Buffaloes team. He threw for 241 yards and two scores in that game, including a 52-yard touchdown to wingback Clester Johnson. This performance put Frazier into consideration for the Heisman Trophy, though he would finish the season as the runner-up to Ohio State's Eddie George in Heisman voting.

The 1995 roster matched Frazier with a number of running backs that included Lawrence Phillips, Ahman Green, Clinton Childs, Damon Benning, Joel Makovicka, and Jay Sims, to form a backfield that set an NCAA record 7.0 yards per rushing attempt. The Cornhuskers averaged 399.8 rushing yards and 52.4 points per game. In the regular season, Frazier completed 92 of 163 passes for 1,362 yards and four interceptions, rushed 97 times for 604 yards and 14 touchdowns, and was never sacked. His longest pass play went 76 yards to split end Reggie Baul, against Oklahoma State on August 31. He was the recipient of the Johnny Unitas Golden Arm Award and was a Consensus All-American.

Nebraska finished the regular season with an 11–0 record, and were matched with the 12–0 Florida Gators in the Tostitos Fiesta Bowl on January 2, 1996. Frazier collected his third consecutive national championship game MVP award as the Cornhuskers defeated Florida's "Fun 'n' Gun" offense by a score of 62–24. He rushed 16 times for 199 yards, and completed 6 of 14 passes for 105 yards, with a 16-yard touchdown pass to Phillips. On what appeared to be a routine short-yardage option sweep to the right sideline in the closing seconds of the 3rd quarter, Frazier kept the ball, turned upfield, and broke seven tackles in a career-high 75-yard touchdown run that was named by Sports Illustrated as one of college football's greatest plays.

CBS reporter Michele Tafoya handed Fraizer the microphone during the postgame celebration following the game: "Oh listen, I had a great career at Nebraska…There is no better way to end it; I want to thank all the fans for all the support, and I want to thank all my teammates—most of all important, I want to thank the Lord Jesus Christ above, because without him, I wouldn't have been able to accomplish anything I have." Frazier graduated from Nebraska following the season.

=== Legacy ===
Frazier's place in the University of Nebraska's football history was firmly secured after helping the Cornhuskers win multiple national and conference championships, going 45–4 with 5,476 total yards of offense and 79 touchdowns. With his jersey number being retired in 1996, he was listed as one of the greatest college football players of the century according to Sport Magazine.

Sports Illustrated's Tim Layden, who covered Frazier in the Tostitos Fiesta Bowl, discussed his leadership and toughness following Nebraska's 62–24 dismantling of the Florida Gators. "On that memorable 75-yard touchdown run, Frazier broke seven tackles and dragged two Florida defenders several yards before shaking free and rolling down the sideline alone," Layden elaborated. "And after playing brilliantly in both Nebraska's 18–16 Orange Bowl loss to Florida State in 1994 and the Cornhuskers' 24–17 national-title victory over Miami last season, he must now be considered one of the best big-game quarterbacks in college football history—its Joe Montana."

On May 7, 2013, Tommie Frazier was elected to the College Football Hall of Fame. He was named to the Nebraska Hall of Fame in 2023.

== Professional playing career ==
Pre-draft measurables
Height	Weight	Arm length	Hand span	40-yard dash	10-yard split	20-yard split	20-yard shuttle	Vertical jump
6 ft 0 1/4 in (1.84 m)	210 lb (95 kg)	33 in (0.84 m)	10 5/8 in (0.27 m)	4.75 s	1.70 s	2.80 s	4.20 s	30.5 in (0.77 m)

Frazier won the MVP award for his 34–18 victory in the East-West Shrine Game, nationally televised on ESPN on January 13, 1996. West Coach Terry Donahue said there was no doubt that Frazier's performance had improved his standing in regards to the NFL draft. "I think he came here with all kinds of doubts...this game really helped him and somebody is going to invest in him. I am really high on him. When I did the Fiesta Bowl, I said the guy was the most dangerous player in college football and I mean it more now. This guy's dangerous. He's great." Frazier completed 11 of 20 passes for 163 yards, rushed six times for 33 yards, scored on a five-yard run, and threw a 52-yard touchdown pass to Kevin Jordan with 5:57 left in the contest.

The East-West Shrine Game showcased Frazier's skill set for the many NFL scouts in attendance, but before the NFL Scouting Combine, he experienced more problems with blood clots. Recruiting analyst Forrest Davis' publication had listed Frazier's speed in the 40-yard dash as 4.50 seconds when he came out of high school, and his test results at Nebraska had been similar. However, Frazier's February 1996 performance at the NFL Scouting Combine was described as "pedestrian" by the February 12, 1996, The Atlanta Journal-Constitution.

=== Canadian Football League ===
Due primarily to health issues, Frazier went unselected in the NFL Draft, but received an offer from the Montreal Alouettes of the Canadian Football League. He signed a contract with the Alouettes on July 15, 1996, and served as the third-string quarterback behind starter Tracy Ham and top reserve Jim Kemp. Frazier played in only one game, on August 30, 1996, a 17–6 loss to the Ottawa Rough Riders in which he came off the bench in the 4th quarter and completed 6 of 17 passes for 55 yards.

Frazier's brief professional football career ended when, on September 4, 1996, he was admitted to Montreal General Hospital with pneumonia. He was given blood thinners because of his history of clots, but spat blood. Frazier needed two weeks to recover, and on his September 17 release, retired from football.

== Coaching career ==
Frazier served as an assistant football coach at Baylor University, and as an assistant director of athletic development at Nebraska. At Baylor, Frazier joined head coach Kevin Steele's coaching staff as a graduate assistant, and worked with the quarterbacks in 1999. He was promoted to a full-time position, and coached Baylor's running backs from 2000 to 2002. Steele failed to improve on Baylor's losing record, and the coaching staff was let go after going 3–9 in 2002. Baylor went 9–36 while Frazier was as an assistant coach for the Bears.

In 2005, Frazier became the 32nd head football coach at Doane College, in Crete, Nebraska, and held that position for two seasons. He resigned following the 2006 season.

=== Head coaching record ===
Year	Team	Overall	Conference	Standing	Bowl/playoffs
Doane Tigers (Great Plains Athletic Conference) (2005–2006)
2005	Doane	2–8	2–8	9th	
2006	Doane	1–9	1–9	11th (last)	
Doane:		3–17	3–17		
Total:		3–17			

== Records and statistics ==
- 33–3 record as starter
- 2 national championships
- 4 Big Eight Conference championships
- former Nebraska Cornhuskers record for total offense, career (5,476 yards)
- former Nebraska Cornhuskers record for touchdown passes, career (43)
- former Nebraska Cornhuskers record for rushing touchdowns by a quarterback, season (14)
- former NCAA record for rushing yards in a bowl game by a quarterback (199)
- former Nebraska Cornhuskers record for total offense in a bowl game (304 yards)
- longest touchdown run in a bowl game (75 yards)

=== College ===
Year	Team	Passing						Rushing			
Year	Team	CMP	ATT	CMP%	YDS	TD	INT	ATT	YDS	AVG	TD
1992	Nebraska	54	121	44.6	873	12	3	93	400	4.3	7
1993	Nebraska	90	186	48.4	1,365	13	6	140	781	5.6	9
1994	Nebraska	22	49	44.9	298	4	3	40	279	7.0	6
1995	Nebraska	98	177	55.4	1,467	18	6	113	803	7.1	16
Career		250	509	49.1	4,003	47	18	386	2,263	5.9	36

Notes – Statistics from the wikitable include bowl game performances.

=== CFL ===
Season	Team	Passing								Rushing	
Season	Team	GP	Comp	Att	Pct	Yds	Y/A	TD–INT	Rtg	Att	Yds
1996	MTL	1	6	17	35.3	55	3.2	0–1	20.5	1	0
Career		1	6	17	35.3	55	3.2	0–1	20.5	1	0

== Additional accolades ==
- First-Team All-American (Football Writers, Walter Camp, AP, AFCA, UPI, American Football Quarterly, College Sports, All-American Football Foundation, 1995)
- Heisman Trophy Runner-Up (1995)
- Johnny Unitas Golden Arm Award Winner (1995)
- UPI Player-of-the-Year (1995)
- Sporting News Player of the Year (1995)
- Sullivan Award Finalist (Amateur Athlete of the Year, 1995)
- Davey O'Brien Quarterback Award Finalist (1995)
- Maxwell Award Finalist (1995)
- Walter Camp Offensive Player-of-the-Year Finalist (1995)
- Red Blaik Leadership Award (All-American FB Foundation, 1995)
- Touchdown Club of Columbus Quarterback of the Year (1995)
- National Quarterback Club Football Player of the Year (1995)
- Football News Offensive Player of the Year Finalist (1995)
- ESPY Play of the Year (1996)
- U.S. Sports Academy Jan. Amateur Male Athlete of the Month
- First-Team All-Big Eight (AP, Coaches, 1995)
- Big Eight Offensive Player-of-the-Year (AP, Coaches, 1995)
- Tom Novak Award Winner (1995)
- 1994 Orange Bowl MVP
- 1995 Orange Bowl MVP
- 1996 Fiesta Bowl MVP
- Davey O'Brien Award Semifinalist (1993)
- Second-Team All-Big Eight (AP, Coaches, 1993)
- Big Eight Freshman/Newcomer-of-the-Year (Coaches, AP, 1992)

== In popular culture ==
Frazier was mentioned by Bob Odenkirk's character, Saul Goodman, on a Season 6 episode of Better Call Saul.
