= Jake Zumbach =

American gridiron football player (born 1950)

Profile
- Position: Defensive end

Personal information
- Born: July 15, 1950 (age 76); Binghamton, New York, U.S.
- Listed height: 6 ft 3 in (1.91 m)
- Listed weight: 245 lb (111 kg)

Career information
- College: Colorado

Career history
- 1974: Montreal Alouettes

Awards and highlights
- Grey Cup champion (1974); Second-team All-Big Eight (1971)

Jake Zumbach (born July 15, 1950) is a retired Canadian football player who played for the Montreal Alouettes of the Canadian Football League (CFL). He played college football at Colorado.
