= Carl Johnson (American football) =

American football player (born 1949)

No. 77, 63
- Position: Tackle / Guard

Personal information
- Born: December 26, 1949 (age 76); Phoenix, Arizona, U.S.
- Listed height: 6 ft 3 in (1.91 m)
- Listed weight: 248 lb (112 kg)

Career information
- High school: South Mountain (Phoenix)
- College: Phoenix JC (1968–1969); Nebraska (1970–1971)
- NFL draft: 1972: 5th round, 112th overall pick

Career history
- New Orleans Saints (1972–1973); Portland Storm (1974); Washington Redskins (1975)*
- * Offseason or practice squad member only

Awards and highlights
- 2× National champion (1970, 1971); Third-team All-American (1971); First-team All-Big Eight (1971)
- Stats at Pro Football Reference

Carl Knud Johnson (born December 26, 1949) is an American former professional football player who was an offensive lineman for two seasons with the New Orleans Saints of the National Football League (NFL). He was selected by the Saints in the fifth round of the 1972 NFL draft. He first enrolled at Phoenix Junior College before transferring to the University of Nebraska–Lincoln.

== Early life and college ==
Carl Knud Johnson was born on December 26, 1949, in Phoenix, Arizona. He attended South Mountain High School in Phoenix.

Johnson first played college football at Phoenix Junior College from 1968 to 1969. He was then a two-year letterman for the Nebraska Cornhuskers from 1970 to 1971. In 1971, he earned Associated Press (AP) first-team All-Big Eight and AP third-team All-American honors in his only season as a Nebraska starter. He was also a member of the Nebraska teams that won the national championship in both 1970 and 1971. Johnson was inducted into the Nebraska Football Hall of Fame in 2014.

== Professional career ==
Johnson was selected by the New Orleans Saints in the fifth round, with the 112th overall pick, of the 1972 NFL draft. He officially signed with the team on May 20, 1972. He played in all 14 games, statting seven, for the Saints during his rookie year in 1972, recording one fumble recovery. He appeared in all 14 games, starting 12, during the 1973 season and made one fumble recovery. Johnson was released by the Saints on September 9, 1974.

Johnson was a member of the Portland Storm of the World Football League in 1974.

Johnson signed with the Washington Redskins in 1975. He was later released on August 8, 1975.
