= Maury Damkroger =

American football player (born 1952)

No. 51
- Position: Linebacker

Personal information
- Born: January 8, 1952 (age 74); Cambridge, Nebraska, U.S.
- Listed height: 6 ft 2 in (1.88 m)
- Listed weight: 230 lb (104 kg)

Career information
- High school: Lincoln (NE) Northeast
- College: Nebraska
- NFL draft: 1974: 7th round, 178th overall pick

Career history
- New England Patriots (1974–1975)

Awards and highlights
- National champion (1971); 2× Orange Bowl champion (1971, 1972); Cotton Bowl Classic champion (1973)
- Stats at Pro Football Reference

Maurice Albert Damkroger (born January 8, 1952) is an American former professional football player who was a linebacker for the New England Patriots of the National Football League (NFL). He played college football as a at fullback for the Nebraska Cornhuskers and was selected by the Patriots in the seventh round of the 1974 NFL draft.

He was also drafted by MLB's Los Angeles Dodgers in 1970 out of high school. His father, Ralph and brother, Steve also played football at Nebraska; Ralph was an End for the Cornhuskers during the 1940s, and Steve played linebacker at UNL from 1979 to 1982.
