= 1971 All-Big Eight Conference football team =

American all-star college football team

The 1971 All-Big Eight Conference football team consists of American football players chosen by various organizations for All-Big Eight Conference teams for the 1971 NCAA University Division football season. The selectors for the 1971 season included the Associated Press (AP).

== Offensive selections ==
=== Tight ends ===
- John Schroll, Kansas (AP-1)
- Al Chandler, Oklahoma (AP-2)

=== Wide receivers ===
- Johnny Rodgers, Nebraska (AP-1)
- Cliff Branch, Colorado (AP-2)

=== Offensive linemen ===
- Dick Rupert, Nebraska (AP-1)
- Ken Jones, Oklahoma (AP-1)
- Carl Johnson, Nebraska (AP-1)
- Marion Latimore, Kansas State (AP-1)
- Bill Kralicek, Colorado (AP-2)
- Jake Zumbach, Colorado (AP-2)
- Dean Unruh, Oklahoma (AP-2)
- Geary Murdock, Iowa State (AP-2)

=== Centers ===
- Tom Brahaney, Oklahoma (AP-1)
- Doug Demler, Nebraska (AP-2)

=== Backs ===
- Greg Pruitt, Oklahoma (AP-1)
- Jack Mildren, Oklahoma (AP-1)
- Jerry Tagge, Nebraska (AP-1)
- Jeff Kinney, Nebraska (AP-1)
- George Amundson, Iowa State (AP-2)
- Charlie Davis, Colorado (AP-2)
- Leon Crosswhite, Oklahoma (AP-2)
- Bill Butler, Kansas State (AP-2)

== Defensive selections ==
=== Defensive ends ===
- Willie Harper, Nebraska (AP-1)
- Ray Hamilton, Oklahoma (AP-1)
- Eddie Sheats, Kansas (AP-2)
- John Brown, Missouri (AP-2)

=== Interior linemen ===
- Rich Glover, Nebraska (AP-1)
- Larry Jacobson, Nebraska (AP-1)
- Herb Orvis, Colorado (AP-1)
- Derland Moore, Oklahoma (AP-1)
- Bud Magrum, Colorado (AP-2)
- John Cowan, Missouri (AP-2)
- Barry Price, Oklahoma State (AP-2)
- Carl Taibi, Colorado (AP-2)

=== Linebackers ===
- Steve Aycock, Oklahoma (AP-1)
- Keith Schroeder, Iowa State (AP-1)
- Kenney Page, Kansas (AP-1)
- Dave Mason, Nebraska (AP-2)
- Bob Terrio, Nebraska (AP-2)
- Matt Blair, Iowa State (AP-2)

=== Defensive backs ===
- Bill Kosch, Nebraska (AP-1)
- John Shelley, Oklahoma (AP-1)
- Joe Blahak, Nebraska (AP-2)
- Tom Carraway, Oklahoma State (AP-2)

== Key ==
AP = Associated Press

== See also ==
- 1971 College Football All-America Team
