= Doug Dumler =

American football player (born 1950)

No. 58, 57
- Position: Center

Personal information
- Born: December 15, 1950 (age 75); Hoisington, Kansas, U.S.
- Listed height: 6 ft 3 in (1.91 m)
- Listed weight: 243 lb (110 kg)

Career information
- High school: Walter Lutheran (IL)
- College: Nebraska
- NFL draft: 1973: 5th round, 108th overall pick

Career history
- New England Patriots (1973–1975); Minnesota Vikings (1976–1977)

Awards and highlights
- 2× National champion (1970, 1971); Second-team All-American (1972)

Career NFL statistics
- Games played: 70
- Games started: 3
- Stats at Pro Football Reference

Douglas Marvin Dumler (born December 15, 1950) is an American former professional football player who was an offensive lineman for five seasons with the New England Patriots and Minnesota Vikings of the National Football League (NFL). He played college football for the Nebraska Cornhuskers.

After his football career, he obtained his Juris Doctor from Suffolk Law School and is an attorney in Fort Collins, Colorado, where he practices estate planning with Haltzman Law Firm, P.C.
