= Larry Jacobson =

American football player (born 1949)

No. 75
- Positions: Defensive tackle, Defensive end

Personal information
- Born: December 10, 1949 (age 76); Sioux Falls, South Dakota, U.S.
- Listed height: 6 ft 6 in (1.98 m)
- Listed weight: 260 lb (118 kg)

Career information
- High school: O'Gorman (Sioux Falls)
- College: Nebraska
- NFL draft: 1972: 1st round, 24th overall pick

Career history
- New York Giants (1972–1974)

Awards and highlights
- 2× National champion (1970, 1971); Outland Trophy (1971); Consensus All-American (1971); First-team All-Big Eight (1971); Nebraska Cornhuskers Jersey No. 75 retired
- Stats at Pro Football Reference

Larry Paul Jacobson (born December 10, 1949) is an American former professional football player who was a defensive tackle for the New York Giants of the National Football League (NFL). A first round selection in the 1972 NFL draft (24th overall) and starter in his rookie year, his pro career was cut short by major injuries to the leg and foot.

== Nebraska Cornhuskers ==
Jacobson grew up in Sioux Falls and graduated from O'Gorman High School in 1968, where he also played basketball. He played college football for the Nebraska Cornhuskers under head coach, Bob Devaney. He was a key player of the "Blackshirts" (Nebraska defense) for the undefeated 1970 and 1971 teams, which won consecutive national championships.

During Jacobson's three seasons on the Huskers (1969–71), Nebraska was 33–2–1, with records of 9–2, 11–0–1, and 13–0, and three consecutive bowl victories. The 38–6 victory in the 1972 Orange Bowl over #2 Alabama was the Huskers' 22nd consecutive win, and 32nd without a loss.

As a senior, Jacobson was an All-American and won the Outland Trophy in 1971 for best interior lineman; the first of eight Outland Trophies won by Nebraska players. Husker (and Giant) teammate Rich Glover would win the award the following season in 1972. He also played in the Senior Bowl.

== NFL career ==
He was the third Nebraska Cornhusker chosen in the first round of the 1972 NFL draft (QB Jerry Tagge - 11th, RB Jeff Kinney - 23rd). A starter in his rookie year, Jacobson played three seasons with the Giants. A broken leg in training camp in 1975 ended his playing career, as he failed his physical in 1976.

Jacobson was an accounting major at Nebraska, and an Academic All-American.
After his brief NFL career, he became a stockbroker with Morgan Stanley.

== Personal life ==
Jacobson now resides in Nebraska with his wife Kathy Jacobson.
