= Tom Novak (American football) =

American football player (1925–1998)

No. 68, 61, 60
- Positions: Center, fullback, linebacker

Personal information
- Born: November 29, 1925
- Died: November 1, 1998 (aged 72); Lincoln, Nebraska, U.S.
- Listed height: 5 ft 10 in (1.78 m)
- Listed weight: 206 lb (93 kg)

Career information
- High school: Omaha South
- College: Nebraska

Awards and highlights
- 1949 first-team All-American (INS); 4x first-team MVIAA (1946, 1947, 1948, 1949); Nebraska Football Hall of Fame (1974); Nebraska Cornhuskers jersey no. 60 retired

Thomas James Novak (November 29, 1925 – November 1, 1998) was an American football center, fullback, and linebacker for the Nebraska Cornhuskers. Nicknamed "Train Wreck" for his aggressive style of play, Novak is the only four-time all-conference selection in school history and was the first NU player to have his number retired.

== Early life ==
Novak was born in 1925 and attended Omaha South High School. He was twice selected as an all-state fullback and led Omaha South to a state championship in 1942.

He served in the United States Navy during World War II before enrolling at the University of Nebraska in 1946 to play football and baseball. He chose NU over a scholarship offer from head coach Frank Leahy and Notre Dame, wanting to stay closer to home.

== Career ==
Novak began his collegiate career playing offensively as a fullback, but transitioned to center during his sophomore season. Though the one-platoon system was not mandated during the 1940s, Nebraska rarely substituted and Novak consistently played both sides of the ball in each of his four seasons. He quickly became beloved by fans, who appreciated his aggressive, hard-nosed style of play. When he played his final career game at Memorial Stadium on November 25, 1949, his twenty-fourth birthday, he was honored with a standing ovation at halftime of Nebraska's 25–14 win over Colorado.

Novak was a first-team Missouri Valley Intercollegiate Athletic Association selection four times, the only player in Nebraska history to do so, and was named a first-team All-American by the International News Service following his senior season. Nebraska was just 11–26 during Novak's four-year career but maintained strong fan support and attendance figures, which is often attributed to Novak's popularity. His jersey no. 60 was permanently retired by the university in 1949 (though he also wore no. 68 and no. 61 during his career, which are not retired).

== Later life ==
Novak was selected by the Chicago Bears in the fourth round of the 1950 NFL draft, but declined to sign a contract. He stayed in Nebraska and opened a trucking business.

The University of Nebraska and Omaha businessman James Gordon Roberts established the Tom Novak Award in 1950 to honor the senior who "best exemplifies courage and determination despite all odds." It is voted on by local writers and presented at the annual Outland Trophy banquet in Omaha.

Novak was paralyzed in 1976 after a fall and used a wheelchair for the rest of his life, but still commonly attended Nebraska sporting events. He died in 1998 at age seventy-two.
