= Tom Brahaney =

American football player (born 1951)

No. 51
- Position: Center

Personal information
- Born: October 23, 1951 (age 75); Midland, Texas, U.S.
- Listed height: 6 ft 2 in (1.88 m)
- Listed weight: 245 lb (111 kg)

Career information
- High school: Midland
- College: Oklahoma
- NFL draft: 1973: 5th round, 109th overall pick

Career history
- St. Louis Cardinals (1973–1981)

Awards and highlights
- 2× Consensus All-American (1971, 1972); 2× First-team All-Big Eight (1971, 1972)

Career NFL statistics
- Games played: 134
- Games started: 53
- Stats at Pro Football Reference
- College Football Hall of Fame

Thomas Brahaney (born October 23, 1951) is an American former professional football player who was a center for nine seasons in the National Football League (NFL) for the St. Louis Cardinals.

He played college football at Oklahoma, where he was an All-American. In 1971, he anchored the Sooners NCAA record breaking Wishbone offense that averaged over 472 rushing yards per game and whose only loss was 35–31, to eventual national champion Nebraska in the Game of the Century. In 2007, he was inducted into the College Football Hall of Fame.
