= 1972 Orange Bowl =

American college football game

- 38th Orange Bowl; National Championship Game (Note: Through luck and fortuitous scheduling, a "national championship game" was occasionally able to settle the matter on the field, as described in some contemporaneous reports. Despite the promotional billing, in several instances there were plausible scenarios for a third team to be selected as national champion by the major selectors, depending on outcomes of other games.) (Note: Title game for AP Trophy and NFF MacArthur Bowl.)
- Alabama's media guide for the game
Alabama Crimson Tide	Nebraska Cornhuskers
(11–0)	(12–0)
SEC	Big Eight
6	38
Head coach: Paul Bryant	Head coach: Bob Devaney
AP / Coaches; 2 / 2	AP / Coaches; 1 / 1
	1	2	3	4	Total
Alabama	0	0	6	0	6
Nebraska	14	14	3	7	38
- Date: January 1, 1972
- Season: 1971
- Stadium: Orange Bowl
- Location: Miami, Florida
- MVP: Jerry Tagge (Nebraska QB); Willie Harper (Nebraska DE)
- Favorite: Nebraska by 6 points
- Referee: R. Pete Williams (SEC) (split crew between SEC and Big 8)
- Attendance: 78,151

United States TV coverage
- Network: NBC
- Announcers: Jim Simpson, Kyle Rote, and Bill Enis
- Nielsen ratings: 28.0

The Miami Orange Bowl in Miami, Florida, hosted the Orange Bowl.

The 1972 Orange Bowl was the 38th edition of the college football bowl game, played at the Orange Bowl in Miami, Florida, on Saturday, January 1. The final game of the 1971–72 bowl season, it matched the top-ranked Nebraska Cornhuskers of the Big Eight Conference and the #2 Alabama Crimson Tide of the Southeastern Conference (SEC). This was a rematch of the 1966 Orange Bowl, where Alabama defeated Nebraska to win the national championship. Both teams were undefeated; Nebraska, the defending national champion, built a large lead in the first half and won 38–6.

== Game summary ==
Six-point favorite Nebraska entered the game on a 31-game unbeaten streak, and scored first on a two-yard touchdown run by Jeff Kinney. Future Heisman Trophy winner Johnny Rodgers scored on a 77-yard punt return on the final play of the first quarter, as Nebraska led 14–0. In the second quarter, quarterback Jerry Tagge and Gary Dixon added touchdown runs of one and two yards respectively, as Nebraska led convincingly 28–0 with over eight minutes remaining in the first half. There was no additional scoring before halftime as the Husker defense stifled the Tide's previously potent Wishbone offense with All-American running back Johnny Musso.

In the third quarter, Bama's Terry Davis scored on a three–yard touchdown run making the score 28–6, eliminating the shutout. Nebraska's Rich Sanger kicked a 21-yard field goal at the end of the third quarter, and a one-yard touchdown run by reserve senior QB Van Brownson made the final score 38–6.

With top-ranked Nebraska's 32-point victory, the 1972 Orange Bowl was one of the most lopsided meetings of #1 vs #2, specifically in a season-ending bowl game. It was also Alabama's largest margin of defeat in a postseason game until the 2026 Rose Bowl against Indiana, which the Hoosiers won 38–3.

=== Scoring ===
First quarter

- Nebraska – Jeff Kinney 1-yard run (kick failed), 3:01
- Nebraska – Johnny Rodgers 77-yard punt return (Maury Damkroger pass from Jerry Tagge), 0:00

Second quarter

- Nebraska – Tagge 1-yard run (Rich Sanger kick), 12:43
- Nebraska – Gary Dixon 2-yard run (Sanger kick), 8:49

Third quarter

- Alabama – Terry Davis 2-yard run (run failed), 5:49
- Nebraska – Sanger 21-yard field goal, 0:00

Fourth quarter

- Nebraska – Van Brownson 1-yard run (Sanger kick), 4:45

== Statistics ==
Statistics	Alabama	Nebraska
First downs	16	15
Rushes–yards	58–241	47–133
Passing yards	47	159
Passes (C–A–I)	3–13–2	11–20–0
Total offense	71–288	67–292
Punts–average	7–43.3	5–42.4
Fumbles–lost	5–2	3–2
Turnovers	4	2
Yards penalized	4–58	4–50

== Final polls ==
Nebraska (13–0) was first in both major polls and was the consensus national champion, having defeated the next three teams in the final AP Poll released on January 3: Oklahoma, Colorado, and Alabama. The Huskers earned all 55 first-place votes in the AP poll; in the UPI coaches poll released in early December, they received 29 of the 31 first-place votes, with the other two to Alabama.
