= Jeff Kinney (American football) =

American football player (born 1949)

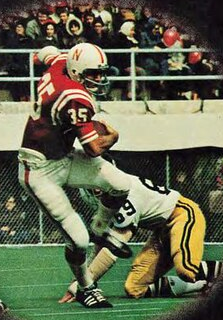
- Kinney (No. 35) with the Cornhuskers, c. 1970

No. 35, 31, 36
- Position: Running back

Personal information
- Born: November 1, 1949 (age 77); Oxford, Nebraska, U.S.
- Listed height: 6 ft 2 in (1.88 m)
- Listed weight: 215 lb (98 kg)

Career information
- High school: McCook (NE)
- College: Nebraska
- NFL draft: 1972: 1st round, 23rd overall pick

Career history
- Kansas City Chiefs (1972–1976); Buffalo Bills (1976)

Awards and highlights
- 2× National champion (1970, 1971); Third-team All-American (1971); First-team All-Big Eight (1971)

Career NFL statistics
- Rushing attempts: 353
- Rushing yards: 1,285
- Total TDs: 6
- Stats at Pro Football Reference

Jeffrey Bruce Kinney (born November 1, 1949) is an American former professional football player who was a running back for five seasons with the Kansas City Chiefs and Buffalo Bills in the National Football League (NFL). At 6'2" and 215 lb., Kinney was selected by the Chiefs in the first round of the 1972 NFL draft with the 23rd overall pick. He played college football for the Nebraska Cornhuskers.

== Early life ==
Born in Oxford, Nebraska, and raised in McCook, Kinney graduated from McCook High School in 1968 and played quarterback.

== Nebraska Cornhuskers ==
He played college football at the University of Nebraska–Lincoln for the Cornhuskers under head coach Bob Devaney, with future head coach Tom Osborne as offensive coordinator. A three-year starter (1969–71), Kinney was the tailback (I-back) on the national championship teams of 1970 and 1971, and the Huskers' leading rusher in 1969 and 1971. He wore #35, often in a tatters, as tear-away jerseys were common for collegiate offensive backs in the early 1970s.

In the "Game of the Century" against the unbeaten Oklahoma Sooners in Norman on Thanksgiving Day 1971, Kinney rushed for 171 yards, 151 in the second half, on 31 carries (5.5 avg.) and scored four touchdowns, the final one with less than two minutes remaining to put Nebraska ahead 35–31, the final score.

The Huskers went 13–0 in 1971 and were consensus national champions; they defeated the next three teams in the final AP poll: Oklahoma, Colorado (31–7 in Lincoln), and Alabama (38–6 in the Orange Bowl). The 1971 Nebraska Cornhuskers are considered among the most dominant teams in college football history. Kinney finished the 1971 season with 1155 yards rushing on 242 carries (4.8 avg.) and 17 touchdowns.

== NFL ==
After a 10-3-1 season, the Kansas City Chiefs held the 23rd overall pick late in the first round of the 1972 NFL draft when they used it to select Kinney. The running back was the second of three Nebraska Cornhusker teammates selected in the first round; QB Jerry Tagge was taken 11th by his hometown team, the Green Bay Packers, and DT Larry Jacobson was selected by the New York Giants with the 24th pick, immediately after. On an unfortunate note, this draft class is often recalled in a poor light by sports historians as the worst in its modern history.

Kinney would not have to wait long both to hit the field and to reunite with teammates as he made his NFL debut as Kansas City faced the New York Giants in the Hall of Fame Game to kickoff the 1972 NFL preseason. In the third week of the preseason, Kansas City's Arrowhead Stadium opened its gates for the first time and local newspapers highlighted the chance to see the college star transition to the professional game. Kinney found a place in the regular line-up by the start of the regular season, starting in weeks 3 and 4, before injuries sidelined him for three games mid-season and again in December with the Chiefs placing him on injured reserve to finish the season. For most of his time in Kansas City, Kenney would serve as a blocking back or injury substitution for Ed Podolak. In his fourth season, he eclipsed Podolak in terms of number of starts, but still accrued fewer carries than the latter. Kinney also lagged behind the starting fullbacks, Wendell Hayes and Woody Green, in carries, yards and touchdowns each year.

At the start of his fifth season in the NFL in 1976, he was released by the Chiefs after the first game and picked up by the Buffalo Bills in mid-September. Kinney was picked up to replace the injured Jim Braxton as the blocking back for O. J. Simpson. A few weeks after being waived, Kinney gained 114 yards against the Chiefs.

Kinney was waived by the Bills in August 1977, and retired. After football, he worked in financial services.

== NFL career statistics ==
Legend
**Bold**	Career high

Year	Team	Games		Rushing					Receiving				
Year	Team	GP	GS	Att	Yds	Avg	Lng	TD	Rec	Yds	Avg	Lng	TD
1972	KAN	9	2	38	122	3.2	16	1	4	45	11.3	19	0
1973	KAN	**14**	1	50	128	2.6	8	1	11	126	**11.5**	**25**	0
1974	KAN	13	3	63	249	4.0	21	0	18	105	5.8	16	**1**
1975	KAN	13	6	85	304	3.6	20	**2**	**21**	**148**	7.0	18	0
1976	KAN	1	0	1	7	**7.0**	7	0	0	0	0.0	0	0
1976	BUF	12	**8**	**116**	**475**	4.1	**22**	1	14	78	5.6	15	0
		62	20	353	1,285	3.6	22	5	68	502	7.4	25	1
