= Rich Glover =

American football player (born 1950)

No. 69, 77, 79
- Position: Defensive tackle

Personal information
- Born: February 6, 1950 (age 76); Bayonne, New Jersey, U.S.
- Listed height: 6 ft 1 in (1.85 m)
- Listed weight: 240 lb (109 kg)

Career information
- High school: Henry Snyder (Jersey City, New Jersey)
- College: Nebraska (1970–1972)
- NFL draft: 1973: 3rd round, 69th overall pick

Career history
- New York Giants (1973); Shreveport Steamers (1974); Philadelphia Eagles (1975)

Awards and highlights
- 2× National champion (1970, 1971); Outland Trophy (1972); UPI Lineman of the Year (1972); Lombardi Award (1972); Unanimous All-American (1972); First-team All-American (1971); Big Eight Defensive Player of the Year (1972); 2× First-team All-Big Eight (1971, 1972); Nebraska Cornhuskers Jersey No. 79 retired
- Stats at Pro Football Reference
- College Football Hall of Fame

Richard Edward Glover (born February 6, 1950) is an American former professional football player who was a defensive tackle for the New York Giants and Philadelphia Eagles of the National Football League (NFL). He played college football for the Nebraska Cornhuskers under head coach Bob Devaney.

Glover played high school football at Henry Snyder High School in Jersey City, New Jersey. Glover recalls a time when his coach, Roy Corso, instructed each player to bring a garbage pail cover with them for after the game. When asked why, Corso responded it was for their own protection. Glover admits if it wasn't for those covers, they never would have made it past the losing team throwing rocks at the bus windows on the way out of the parking lot.

In his senior season for the Huskers in 1972, he won the Outland Trophy and the Lombardi Award; the second of eight Nebraska winners of the Outland Trophy and the first of five Nebraska winners of the Lombardi Award. Nebraska players have won nine Outland Trophies overall, by far the most in the nation. Oklahoma has the second most with four. As the middle guard, he was a key member of the Blackshirts as an underclassman on the 1970 and 1971 undefeated Nebraska teams that won consecutive national championships. The 1972 team was a pre-season #1 but lost their road opener to UCLA and finished 9–2–1, rising to fourth in the final AP poll, buoyed by a third consecutive Orange Bowl victory, 40–6 over Notre Dame.

Glover was the second consecutive winner of the Outland Trophy from Nebraska, his New York Giant teammate Larry Jacobson won in 1971. He is the first of four Cornhuskers (Dave Rimington, Dean Steinkuhler and Ndamukong Suh), and one of thirteen lineman, to have won both the Outland Trophy and the Lombardi Award in their careers. Glover also finished third in the 1972 Heisman Trophy voting, won by teammate Johnny Rodgers; he was the only defensive player in the top ten.

He was selected to the Nebraska All-Century Football Team and is one of sixteen Cornhuskers to have his jersey (#79) retired. Glover was selected to the College Football Hall Of Fame in 1995.

In 1999 Glover was selected as a starting defensive tackle by Sports Illustrated in their "NCAA Football All-Century Team" alongside other starting defensive tackle Bronko Nagurski. The second and third team defensive tackles were Buck Buchanan, Lee Roy Selmon, Mike Reid and Randy White. Glover was one of six Nebraska Cornhuskers on SI's All-Century Team 85 man roster; the others being Johnny Rodgers, Dave Rimington, Dean Steinkuhler, Tommie Frazier, and Aaron Taylor. Glover, the oldest of the six, was the only Cornhusker defensive player selected.

Following his collegiate career, he was selected by the New York Giants in the third round of the 1973 NFL draft, the 69th pick overall. He played with the Giants (along with fellow Husker and Outland winner Larry Jacobson) for one season before joining the Shreveport Steamers of the World Football League in 1974. He then joined the Philadelphia Eagles in 1975 before injuries ended his NFL career. He went on to become a teacher and coach in the public school system. He was the phys ed teacher at public school #28, Jersey City in 1974/75. In 2004, he was part of the New Mexico State football coaching staff.

He is currently the assistant coach at Harrison High School. Previously he was head coach at William L. Dickinson High School and James J. Ferris High School, both in Jersey City.
