= Jerry Tagge =

American gridiron football player (born 1950)

No. 8, 14, 17
- Position: Quarterback

Personal information
- Born: April 12, 1950 (age 76); Omaha, Nebraska, U.S.
- Listed height: 6 ft 2 in (1.88 m)
- Listed weight: 215 lb (98 kg)

Career information
- High school: Green Bay West (Green Bay, Wisconsin)
- College: Nebraska
- NFL draft: 1972: 1st round, 11th overall pick

Career history
- 1972–1974: Green Bay Packers
- 1975: San Antonio Wings
- 1977–1979: BC Lions

Awards and highlights
- Jeff Nicklin Memorial Trophy (1977); CFL All-Star (1977); CFL West All-Star (1977); 2× National champion (1970, 1971); Second-team All-American (1971); First-team All-Big Eight (1971); Second-team All-Big Eight (1970)

Career NFL statistics
- Passing attempts: 281
- Passing completions: 136
- Completion percentage: 48.4%
- TD–INT: 3–17
- Passing yards: 1,583
- Passer rating: 44.2
- Stats at Pro Football Reference

Jerry Lee Tagge (born April 12, 1950) is an American former professional football player who was a quarterback in the National Football League (NFL), World Football League (WFL) and Canadian Football League (CFL). He played college football for the Nebraska Cornhuskers, leading them to consecutive national championships in 1970 and 1971. Tagge played professionally with the Green Bay Packers of the NFL from 1972 to 1974, the San Antonio Wings of the WFL in 1975, and the BC Lions of the CFL from 1977 to 1979.

== Early life ==
Tagge was born at Offutt Air Force Base south of Omaha, Nebraska, the third child and second son of William Robert (Billy) Tagge and Lois Jurczyk Tagge.

As a teenager in the mid-1960s in Green Bay, Wisconsin, Tagge sold concessions at Lambeau Field, the home of the Green Bay Packers, then coached by Vince Lombardi. He graduated from Green Bay West High School in 1968.

== College career ==
Tagge played college football at the University of Nebraska–Lincoln under head coach Bob Devaney. In his sophomore year in 1969, Tagge rose to second-string quarterback for the Cornhuskers. His playing time increased until midway through his junior year when he took over the starting position from Van Brownson, leading the team to a 10–0–1 regular season and a matchup with LSU in the Orange Bowl. Tagge scored the game-winning touchdown in a 17–12 victory over the Tigers on a quarterback sneak, earning himself Most Valuable Player honors, and the Huskers the AP national championship for 1970. Both #1 Texas and #2 Ohio State lost their bowl games on New Year's Day. (Through the 1973 season, the final UPI coaches' poll was released in December, before the bowls.)

In his senior season in 1971, Tagge quarterbacked the Huskers for the entire season, including the "Game of the Century" against the undefeated Oklahoma Sooners in Norman, a 35–31 victory on Thanksgiving Day. Nebraska crushed undefeated Alabama, 38–6, in the Orange Bowl, earning Tagge MVP honors for the second time. The Huskers finished 13–0 in 1971 and were a consensus choice, earning consecutive national titles. Nebraska had defeated the next three teams in the final AP poll: Oklahoma, Colorado (31–7 in Lincoln), and Alabama. Tagge then played in the Hula Bowl in Honolulu, leading the North to a 24–7 win over the South.

Tagge was the first of three Nebraska Cornhuskers selected in the first round of the 1972 NFL draft, along with running back Jeff Kinney and defensive tackle Larry Jacobson. The eleventh overall pick, Tagge was the first quarterback selected.

== Professional career ==
Tagge's performance earned the notice of Dan Devine, head coach of the Green Bay Packers. Devine was formerly the head coach at Missouri in the Big Eight Conference, through the 1970 season. On his recommendation, the Packers selected Tagge in the first round of the 1972 NFL draft (11th overall). Tagge did not enjoy the success in his hometown that he had at Nebraska, completing only three touchdown passes in 17 games played during three seasons from 1972 to 1974. Following the 1974 season, Devine left the Packers for Notre Dame. The Packers' new head coach was Bart Starr, who released Tagge during the 1975 preseason, in early September.

Tagge signed with the San Antonio Wings of the short-lived World Football League. He started in the Wings' final game on October 19, 1975, and was intercepted five times; he ran for two touchdowns and threw for another. The Wings folded three days later with the rest of the WFL on October 22.

Tagge moved north to Canada to the CFL, joining the BC Lions in 1977. He saw plenty of playing time as a starter, and was awarded the Jeff Nicklin Memorial Trophy in his first season. He played three seasons with BC, until a knee injury ended his career in 1979.

== Post-football career and life ==
In 1981, Tagge moved to St. Louis, where he sold apartment buildings. He also met his future wife, Betty, whom he married the following year. He returned to Nebraska in 1986, initially selling life insurance, then founded Tagge-Rutherford Financial Services in Omaha, for which he serves as executive vice president.

== Career highlights ==
As the Nebraska Cornhuskers' quarterback, he led his team to national titles in 1970 and 1971, was named Orange Bowl Most Valuable Player (MVP) in 1971 and 1972 and shared honors as Hula Bowl MVP with Walt Patulski of Notre Dame, the first selection in the 1972 draft. Additionally, Tagge was an All-American in 1971 and is a member of the University of Nebraska–Lincoln Hall of Fame.

At Nebraska, Tagge threw for 5,071 yards, completing 377 of 637 passes (59.2%), 32 for touchdowns. He was a first-round draft choice, 11th overall, of the Green Bay Packers in 1972.

In three years with the Packers, Tagge played 17 games completing 136 of 281 passes for 1583 yards,3 TDs, and 17 interceptions. In 1975, he played briefly for the Wings in the WFL, where completed 18 of 34 passes for 265 yards, 1 TD, and 5 interceptions.

In 1977, he moved north to Canada, where he was named a CFL all-star and winner of the Jeff Nicklin Memorial Trophy and runner-up for the CFL's Most Outstanding Player Award. In 1977, he completed 232 of 405 passes for 2787 yards, and in 1978, he hit 243 of 430 passes for 3134 yards. He played part of the 1979 season before injuries forced him to retire.

As a professional quarterback, Tagge had 718 completions in 1,304 attempts for 9,277 yards and 38 TDs.

== See also ==
- List of NCAA major college football yearly passing leaders
