= Daryl White =

American football player (born 1951)

No. 67
- Position: Offensive guard

Personal information
- Born: October 12, 1951 (age 75); Newark, New Jersey, U.S.
- Listed height: 6 ft 3 in (1.91 m)
- Listed weight: 250 lb (113 kg)

Career information
- High school: East Orange (East Orange, New Jersey)
- College: Nebraska
- NFL draft: 1974: 4th round, 98th overall pick

Career history
- Cincinnati Bengals (1974)*; Detroit Lions (1974); Green Bay Packers (1975)*; Ottawa Rough Riders (1975); Montreal Alouettes (1976)*; Hamilton Tiger-Cats (1976)
- * Offseason or practice squad member only

Awards and highlights
- Consensus national champion (1971); 2× First-team All-American (1972, 1973); 2× First-team All-Big 8 (1972, 1973)
- Stats at Pro Football Reference

Robert Daryl White (born October 12, 1951) is an American former professional football offensive guard who played for the Detroit Lions of the National Football League (NFL). He played college football for the Nebraska Cornhuskers and was selected by the Cincinnati Bengals in the fourth round of the 1974 NFL draft.

== Early life ==
Robert Daryl White was born on October 12, 1951, in Newark, New Jersey. He played high school football, baseball, and basketball at East Orange High School in East Orange, New Jersey. He earned all-state honors in football and baseball. White was also a three-year letterman in basketball.

== College career ==
Smith enrolled at the University of Nebraska–Lincoln to play college football for the Cornhuskers. He was on the varsity team in 1970 but did not earn a varsity letter. He was a three-year letterman from 1971 to 1973 at offensive tackle. White was a stater on Nebraska's undefeated 1971 national championship team, earning honorable mention All-Big Eight Conference honors. In 1972, he was named a first-team All-American by the Newspaper Enterprise Association (NEA) and a third-team All-American by the Associated Press (AP). As a senior in 1973, he garnered first-team All-American recognition from United Press International, The Sporting News, Football News, and the American Football Coaches Association, and second-team All-American honors from the AP and NEA. White was named first-team All-Big 8 by the AP in both 1972 and 1973 and by UPI in 1973. He was a team co-captain in 1973 as well. He majored in physical education at Nebraska.

== Professional career ==
White was selected by the Cincinnati Bengals in the fourth round, with the 98th overall pick, of the 1974 NFL draft. He signed with the team on February 25. He was released on September 10 before the start of the 1974 regular season.

White signed with the Detroit Lions on September 19, 1974, as an offensive guard. He played in ten games for the Lions during the 1974 season, mostly on special teams.

On August 8, 1975, White was traded to the Green Bay Packers for an undisclosed conditional draft pick, the condition being that White make the team. He was released on August 26, 1975, after the third of six preseason games.

White started a five-day trial with the Ottawa Rough Riders of the Canadian Football League (CFL) on September 22, 1975. He played in five games for the Rough Riders before being released to make room on the roster for Charlie Brandon.

White signed with the Montreal Alouettes for the 1976 CFL season. On July 2, during the preseason, White, Jimmy Edwards, Lewis Cook, Bart Evans, Gord Stewart, and the rights to retired quarterback Jerry Keeling were traded to the Hamilton Tiger-Cats for Andy Hopkins. White played in three games for the Tiger-Cats before being released.

== Personal life ==
White was a teacher/coach for over 40 years until retiring following the 2014–15 school year.
