= Dave Mason (American football) =

American football player (born 1949)

No. 28, 43
- Position: Safety

Personal information
- Born: November 2, 1949 (age 77); Menominee, Michigan, U.S.
- Listed height: 6 ft 0 in (1.83 m)
- Listed weight: 199 lb (90 kg)

Career information
- High school: Green Bay West
- College: Nebraska
- NFL draft: 1973: 10th round, 246th overall pick

Career history
- Minnesota Vikings (1973)*; New England Patriots (1973); Green Bay Packers (1974)
- * Offseason or practice squad member only

Awards and highlights
- 2× National champion (1970, 1971); Second-team All-Big Eight (1971)
- Stats at Pro Football Reference

Dave Mason (born November 2, 1949) is a former safety in the National Football League (NFL).

== Biography ==
Mason was born David Clayton Mason on November 2, 1949, in Menominee, Michigan.

== Career ==
Mason was drafted in the tenth round of the 1973 NFL draft by the Minnesota Vikings and played that season with the New England Patriots. The following season, he played with the Green Bay Packers.

He played at the collegiate level at the University of Nebraska–Lincoln.
