= Johnny Rodgers =

American gridiron football player (born 1951)

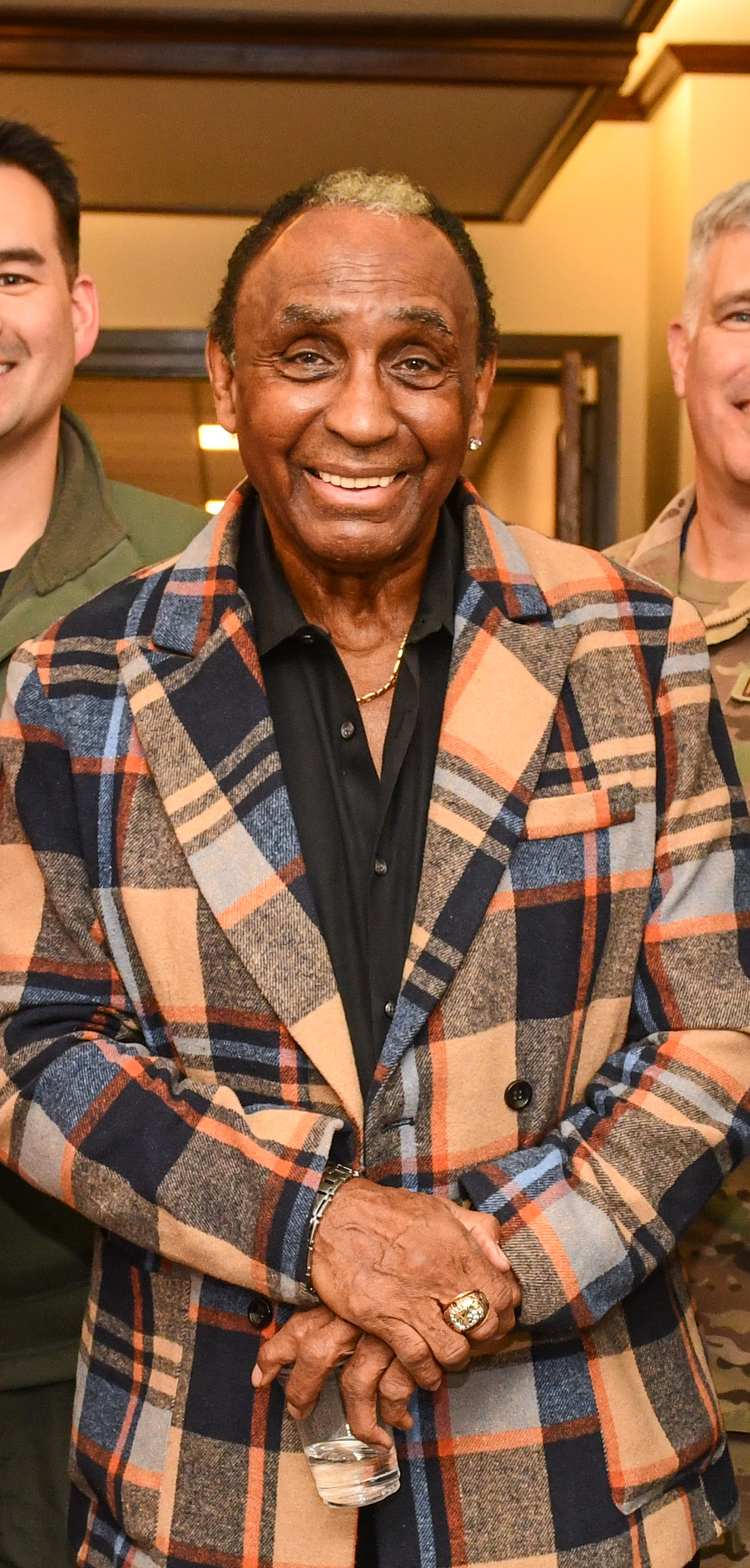
- Rodgers in 2026

No. 20
- Positions: Running back, wide receiver, return specialist

Personal information
- Born: July 5, 1951 (age 75); Omaha, Nebraska, U.S.
- Listed height: 5 ft 10 in (1.78 m)
- Listed weight: 180 lb (82 kg)

Career information
- High school: Technical (Omaha)
- College: Nebraska (1970–1972)
- NFL draft: 1973: 1st round, 25th overall pick

Career history
- Montreal Alouettes (1973–1976); San Diego Chargers (1977–1978)

Awards and highlights
- Grey Cup champion (1974); 2× Jeff Russel Memorial Trophy (1974, 1975); CFL's Most Outstanding Rookie (1973); 3× CFL All-Star (1973–1975); 4× CFL Eastern All-Star (1973–1976); 2× National champion (1970, 1971); Heisman Trophy (1972); Unanimous All-American (1972); Consensus All-American (1971); 2× First-team All-Big Eight (1971, 1972); Second-team All-Big Eight (1970); First-team AP All-Time All-American (2025); Nebraska Cornhuskers No. 20 retired

Career CFL statistics
- Receptions: 186
- Receiving yards: 3,463
- Receiving touchdowns: 28
- Rushing yards: 1,138
- Rushing average: 5.3
- Rushing touchdowns: 7
- Return yards: 1,843
- Return touchdowns: 2
- Stats at Pro Football Reference
- College Football Hall of Fame

Johnny “The Jet” Steven Rodgers (born July 5, 1951) is an American former professional football player. He played college football for the Nebraska Cornhuskers and won the Heisman Trophy in 1972. Rodgers played in the Canadian Football League (CFL) with the Montreal Alouettes and in the National Football League (NFL) with the San Diego Chargers. He was inducted into the College Football Hall of Fame in 2000.

== College career ==
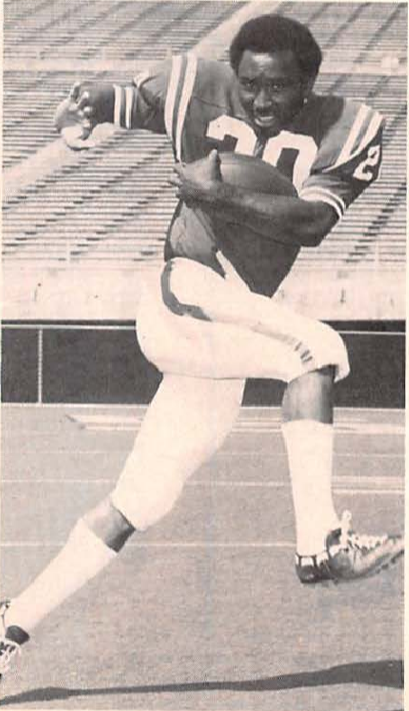
Rodgers in 1972

Nicknamed "the Jet" for his rapid acceleration and speed on the field, Rodgers was voted high school athlete of the year as a player for Omaha's Tech High.

As a player at the University of Nebraska–Lincoln, Rodgers served as a punt return specialist, pass receiver, and running back. Rodgers broke virtually every offensive team record, was twice named to the College Football All-America Team and won the Walter Camp Award and the Heisman Trophy in 1972 for most outstanding player in college football in the United States.

In his three years with the Cornhuskers, the versatile Rodgers established an all-purpose NCAA yardage record of 5,586. Former Nebraska coach Tom Osborne, who served as Nebraska's offensive coordinator in the early 1970s, wrote in his 1985 book More Than Winning that Rodgers had the greatest ability to return punts of any player he ever saw. Likewise, College Football News has described him as "the greatest kick returner in college football history." Rodgers returned seven punts for touchdowns (NCAA record at the time) and one kickoff for a touchdown in his college career.

Rodgers was, at one time, convicted of a gas station robbery while he was a student at the University of Nebraska in 1970. He is the only Heisman winner who had a then-present felony conviction before receiving the award. He was pardoned by the Nebraska Board of Pardons, and his conviction was vacated, on November 14, 2013. He later was charged with assault in 1985 while living in southern California.

In 1971, in what has become known as college football's "Game of the Century," Rodgers returned a punt 72 yards to score the first touchdown which set the tone for his team's 35–31 victory over the University of Oklahoma. ESPN describes Rodgers' performance as "unforgettable." However, some observers consider his greatest single performance to be in the 1973 Orange Bowl when he led his team to a 40–6 victory over Notre Dame. Rodgers ran for three touchdowns, caught a 50-yard pass for another touchdown, and threw a 54-yard touchdown pass to a teammate. He did all this before leaving the game with 21 minutes still to play.

- 1970: 39 carries for 219 yards with 4 TD. 39 catches for 710 yards with 7 TD.
- 1971: 40 carries for 269 yards with 2 TD. 57 catches for 956 yards with 11 TD.
- 1972: 73 carries for 348 yards with 10 TD. 58 catches for 1013 yards with 9 TD.

== Professional career ==
Although a 1973 first-round draft pick of the San Diego Chargers, Rodgers signed a three-year contract in excess of $100,000 annually to play with the Canadian Football League's Montreal Alouettes on May 24. He had spurned the Chargers who he said was "offering fourth and fifth-round money." Always a fan favorite who was affectionately known as the "ordinary superstar" (a nickname he coined), Rodgers won the CFL's Most Outstanding Rookie Award in 1973. In his four years with the Alouettes, Rodgers won the Jeff Russel Memorial Trophy twice (Eastern division MVP and CFL runner-up), was either a CFL or Eastern all-star each season, and helped lead his team to a Grey Cup championship in 1974.

Rodgers returned to the United States, signing a $925,000-plus contract with the Chargers on January 3, 1977. Hamstring injuries kept him out of the game for most of his first NFL season and the following year a freak knee injury sustained during team practice ended his career after only 17 NFL games.

== Career statistics ==
Year	Team	League	GP	Receiving					Rushing					Punt returns				
Year	Team	League	GP	Rec	Yds	Avg	Lng	TD	Att	Yds	Avg	Lng	TD	Ret	Yds	Avg	Lng	TD
1973	MON	CFL	14	41	841	20.5	72	7	55	303	5.4	58	0	—	—	—	—	—
1974	MON	CFL	16	60	1,024	17.1	70	7	87	402	4.6	53	4	—	—	—	—	—
1975	MON	CFL	15	40	849	21.2	70	8	54	293	5.4	38	2	60	912	15.2	101	2
1976	MON	CFL	14	45	749	16.6	55	6	20	50	2.5	41	1	75	931	12.5	53	0
1977	SD	NFL	11	12	187	15.6	43	0	3	44	14.7	33	0	15	158	10.5	52	0
1978	SD	NFL	6	5	47	9.4	12	0	1	5	5.0	5	0	11	88	8.0	15	0
CFL totals			59	186	3,463	18.6	72	28	216	1,138	5.3	58	7	135	1,843	13.7	101	2
NFL totals			17	17	234	13.8	43	0	4	49	12.3	33	0	26	246	9.5	52	0

== Awards and honors ==
CFL

- Grey Cup champion (1974)
- 2× Jeff Russel Memorial Trophy (1974, 1975)
- CFL's Most Outstanding Rookie (1973)
- 3× CFL All-Star (1973–1975)
- 4× CFL Eastern All-Star (1973–1976)

College

- 2× National champion (1970, 1971)
- Heisman Trophy (1972)
- Walter Camp Award (1972)
- UPI Player of the Year (1972)
- Chic Harley Award (1972)
- Unanimous All-American (1972)
- Consensus All-American (1971)
- 2× First-team All-Big Eight (1971, 1972)
- Second-team All-Big Eight (1970)
- First-team AP All-Time All-American (2025)
- Nebraska Cornhuskers No. 20 retired

== Legacy ==
In 1999, Rodgers was selected to the Nebraska All-Century Football Team via fan poll and named to the All-Century Nebraska football team by Gannett News Service. In 2000, he was voted the University of Nebraska's "Player of the Century" by Sports Illustrated. In 2002, he was named to the Athlon Sports Nebraska All-Time Team. He is one of only sixteen Cornhuskers to have his jersey retired by the team.

In 1999, Rodgers was selected as a receiver by Sports Illustrated in their "NCAA Football All-Century Team". Other receivers selected were Jerry Rice, Mike Ditka, Pat Richter, Tim Brown, Raghib Ismail, Don Hutson, Bennie Oosterbaan, Howard Twilley, Ted Kwalick, Anthony Carter, Keith Jackson and Desmond Howard. Rodgers was one of six Nebraska Cornhuskers on this All-Century Team 85 man roster; the others being Rich Glover, Dave Rimington, Dean Steinkuhler, Tommie Frazier and Aaron Taylor.

In 1999, Rodgers was selected as a starting receiver to the Walter Camp Football Foundation College Football All Century Team. Other receivers selected were Fred Biletnikoff, Tim Brown, Bernie Oosterbaan, Larry Kelley, Raghib Ismail, Don Hutson, Howard Twilley and Keith Jackson. Rodgers was one of six Nebraska Cornhuskers selected to this 83 man roster; the others being Rimington, Steinkuhler, Will Shields, Frazier and Taylor.

On the College Football News list of the 100 Greatest Players of All-Time, Johnny Rodgers was ranked #44. In 2007, he was ranked #23 on ESPN's Top 25 Players In College Football History list. In 2000 Johnny Rodgers was inducted into the College Football Hall of Fame and was also voted the "Most Valuable Player" in the history of the Big Eight.

Rodgers also remains a legend north of the border in Montreal. The Alouettes honored him with a special homecoming on September 11, 2011, 35 years since he last wore a Larks uniform. He was greeted with a standing ovation.

In 2011 the Jet Award was established in Rodgers honor, as a national award given annually to the best return specialist in all of college football. Beginning with the 2012 award ceremony, in addition to being given to the annual award winner, the Jet Award will be presented retroactively one decade at a time, starting with the 1959–1969 winners.

== Personal life ==
Rodgers was reported to have become a devotee of Guru Maharaj Ji, head of the Divine Light Mission, in 1974. Rodgers met Majaraj Ji for the first time in January 1976 to discuss the guru's international tour, and in an interview at the time stated that he had joined the Divine Light Mission out of a search for deeper meaning in his life.

In 1987, Rodgers was sentenced to six months in jail for wielding a gun at a cable TV employee when the employee visited his home to retrieve equipment due to Rodgers' lack of payment. He was also stopped at the US-Mexico border in 1985 and found to be in possession of methamphetamine.

Today, Rodgers is a businessman in Omaha, Nebraska, where he operates a sports marketing company and bedding products manufacturer. He also works with his alma mater to encourage athletes who dropped out of school to return and complete their educations.

Rodgers has also authored a book entitled An Era of Greatness about the University of Nebraska football team during his playing days.

Rodgers was president of the Malcolm X Memorial Foundation from 1995 to 2005.

In 2007 Rodgers was a brief partner in a sports bar located in midtown Omaha bearing his name. In less than one year the partnership fell apart and dueling lawsuits ensued.

In May 2014, Rodgers was hired as vice president of new business development at Rural Media Group.

In November 2021, Rodgers was hospitalized at the University of Nebraska Medical Center with COVID-19 but was released two weeks later.

His daughter is Jewel Rodgers, poet laureate of Nebraska.
