= 1971–72 NCAA football bowl games =

Series of post-season NCAA football games

- Season: 1971
- Number of bowls: 20
- Bowl games: November 26, 1971 – January 1, 1972
- National Championship: 1972 Orange Bowl
- Location of Championship: Miami Orange Bowl; Miami, Florida
- Champions: Nebraska
Bowl record by conference
Conference	Bowls	Record	Number of teams in final AP poll
SEC	6	4–2 (0.667)	6
Big Eight	4	3–1 (0.750)	3
Independents	4	1–3 (0.250)	3
SWC	2	0–2 (0.000)	2
MAC	1	1–0 (1.000)	1
Missouri Valley	1	1–0 (1.000)	0
Pac-8	1	1–0 (1.000)	3
WAC	1	1–0 (1.000)	1
ACC	1	0–1 (0.000)	0
Big Ten	1	0–1 (0.000)	1
PCAA	1	0–1 (0.000)	0
SoCon	1	0–1 (0.000)	0

The 1971–72 NCAA football bowl games were a series of post-season games played in November and December 1971 and January 1972 to end the 1971 NCAA University Division football season and 1971 NCAA College Division football season. A total of 20 team-competitive games were played between November 26, 1971, and January 1, 1972. The Orange Bowl featured a matchup of the number-one and number-two ranked teams for the de facto national championship. Several all-star games followed.

A one-off charity game, the Mercy Bowl, was also played on December 11.

== Schedule ==
Rankings are from AP poll, prior to the bowl games in question.

Date	Game	Site	TV	Teams	Results
Nov. 26	Knute Rockne Bowl	Boardwalk Hall; Atlantic City, New Jersey		Bridgeport (9–1); Hampden-Sydney (10–0)	Bridgeport 17; Hampden-Sydney 12
Nov. 26	Amos Alonzo Stagg Bowl	Garrett–Harrison Stadium; Phenix City, Alabama		Samford (7–1); Ohio Wesleyan (8–0)	Samford 20; Ohio Wesleyan 10
Dec. 4	Azelea Classic	Ladd Stadium; Mobile, Alabama		Jackson State (8–1–1); Alabama A&M (5–5)	Jackson State 40; Alabama A&M 21
Dec. 11	Orange Blossom Classic	Miami Orange Bowl; Miami, Florida		Florida A&M (5–5); Kentucky State (7–3)	Florida A&M 27; Kentucky State 9
Dec. 11	Boardwalk Bowl	Boardwalk Hall; Atlantic City, New Jersey	ABC	No. 1 Delaware (9–1); C.W. Post (8–1)	Delaware 72; C.W. Post 22
Dec. 11	Grantland Rice Bowl	BREC Memorial Stadium; Baton Rouge, Louisiana	ABC	No. 5 Tennessee State (8–1); No. 2 McNeese State (9–0–1)	Tennessee State 26; McNeese State 23
Dec. 11	Pioneer Bowl	Memorial Stadium; Wichita Falls, Texas	ABC	No. 4 Louisiana Tech (8–2); No. 3 Eastern Michigan (7–0–2)	Louisiana Tech 14; Eastern Michigan 3
Dec. 11	Camellia Bowl	Hughes Stadium; Sacramento, California	ABC	No. 7 Boise State (9–2); Chico State (9–1)	Boise State 32; Chico State 28
Dec. 18	Sun Bowl	Sun Bowl; El Paso, Texas	CBS	No. 11 LSU (8–3); Iowa State (8–3)	LSU 33; Iowa State 15
Dec. 18	Pasadena Bowl	Rose Bowl; Pasadena, California		Memphis State (4–6); San Jose State (5–5–1)	Memphis State 28; San Jose State 9
Dec. 20	Liberty Bowl	Memphis Memorial Stadium; Memphis, Tennessee	ABC	No. 9 Tennessee (9–2); No. 18 Arkansas (8–2–1)	Tennessee 14; Arkansas 13
Dec. 27	Fiesta Bowl	Sun Devil Stadium; Tempe, Arizona	Mizlou	No. 8 Arizona State (10–1); Florida State (8–3)	Arizona State 45; Florida State 38
Dec. 28	Tangerine Bowl	Tangerine Bowl; Orlando, Florida		No. 14 Toledo (11–0); Richmond (5–5)	Toledo 28; Richmond 3
Dec. 30	Peach Bowl	Fulton County Stadium; Atlanta, Georgia	Mizlou	No. 17 Ole Miss (9–2); Georgia Tech (6–5)	Ole Miss 41; Georgia Tech 18
Dec. 31	Gator Bowl	Gator Bowl Stadium; Jacksonville, Florida	ABC	No. 6 Georgia (10–1); North Carolina (9–2)	Georgia 7 North Carolina 3
Dec. 31	Astro-Bluebonnet Bowl	Astrodome; Houston, Texas	HTN	No. 7 Colorado (9–2); No. 15 Houston (9–2)	Colorado 29; Houston 17
Jan. 1	Sugar Bowl	Tulane Stadium; New Orleans, Louisiana	ABC	No. 3 Oklahoma (10–1); No. 5 Auburn (9–1)	Oklahoma 40; Auburn 22
Jan. 1	Cotton Bowl Classic	Cotton Bowl; Dallas, Texas	CBS	No. 10 Penn State (10–1); No. 12 Texas (8–2)	Penn State 30; Texas 6
Jan. 1	Rose Bowl	Rose Bowl; Pasadena, California	NBC	No. 16 Stanford (8–3); No. 4 Michigan (11–0)	Stanford 13; Michigan 12
Jan. 1	Orange Bowl	Miami Orange Bowl; Miami, Florida	NBC	No. 1 Nebraska (12–0); No. 2 Alabama (11–0)	Nebraska 38; Alabama 6

=== Conference performance in bowl games ===
Conference	Games	Record			Bowls	
Conference	Games	W	L	Pct.	Won	Lost
SEC	6	4	2	.667	Sun, Liberty, Peach, Gator	Sugar, Orange
Big Eight	4	3	1	.750	Astro-Bluebonnet, Sugar, Orange	Sun
Independents	4	1	3	.250	Cotton	Fiesta, Peach, Astro-Bluebonnet
SWC	2	0	2	.000	—	Liberty, Cotton
MAC	1	1	0	1.000	Tangerine	—
Missouri Valley	1	1	0	1.000	Pasadena	—
Pac-8	1	1	0	1.000	Rose	—
WAC	1	1	0	1.000	Fiesta	—
ACC	1	0	1	.000	—	Gator
Big Ten	1	0	1	.000	—	Rose
PCAA	1	0	1	.000	—	Pasadena
SoCon	1	0	1	.000	—	Tangerine

== See also ==
- 1971 NCAA University Division football rankings
