= 1971 Mississippi State Bulldogs football team =

American college football season

1971 Mississippi State Bulldogs football
- Conference: Southeastern Conference
- Record: 2–9 (1–7 SEC)
- Head coach: Charles Shira (5th season)
- Home stadium: Scott Field; Mississippi Veterans Memorial Stadium

1971 Southeastern Conference football standings
| | Conf. | | | | | Overall |
| Team | W | | L | | T | W | | L | | T |
|---|---|---|---|---|---|---|---|---|---|---|
| No. 4 Alabama $ | 7 | – | 0 | – | 0 | 11 | – | 1 | – | 0 |
| No. 7 Georgia | 5 | – | 1 | – | 0 | 11 | – | 1 | – | 0 |
| No. 12 Auburn | 5 | – | 1 | – | 0 | 9 | – | 2 | – | 0 |
| No. 15 Ole Miss | 4 | – | 2 | – | 0 | 10 | – | 2 | – | 0 |
| No. 9 Tennessee | 4 | – | 2 | – | 0 | 10 | – | 2 | – | 0 |
| No. 11 LSU | 3 | – | 2 | – | 0 | 9 | – | 3 | – | 0 |
| Vanderbilt | 1 | – | 5 | – | 0 | 4 | – | 6 | – | 1 |
| Florida | 1 | – | 6 | – | 0 | 4 | – | 7 | – | 0 |
| Kentucky | 1 | – | 6 | – | 0 | 3 | – | 8 | – | 0 |
| Mississippi State | 1 | – | 7 | – | 0 | 2 | – | 9 | – | 0 |
$ – Conference champion; Rankings from AP Poll

The 1971 Mississippi State Bulldogs football team represented Mississippi State University as a member of the Southeastern Conference (SEC) during the 1971 NCAA University Division football season. Led by fifth year head coach Charles Shira, the Bulldogs compiled an overall record of 2–9 with a mark of 1–7 in conference play, placing last out of ten teams in the SEC. Mississippi State played three home games at Scott Field in Starkville, Mississippi and three at Mississippi Veterans Memorial Stadium in Jackson, Mississippi.

== Schedule ==
| Date | Opponent | Site | Result | Attendance | Source |
|---|---|---|---|---|---|
| September 11 | at Oklahoma State* | Lewis Field; Stillwater, OK | L 7–26 | 31,500 | |
| September 18 | Florida | Mississippi Veterans Memorial Stadium; Jackson, MS | W 13–10 | 33,500 | |
| September 25 | Vanderbilt | Scott Field; Starkville, MS | L 19–49 | 29,000 | |
| October 2 | at No. 11 Georgia | Sanford Stadium; Athens, GA | L 7–35 | 53,003 | |
| October 9 | at Florida State* | Doak Campbell Stadium; Tallahassee, FL | L 9–27 | 27,415 | |
| October 16 | Lamar* | Scott Field; Starkville, MS | W 24–7 | 18,000 | |
| October 23 | vs. No. 18 Tennessee | Memphis Memorial Stadium; Memphis, TN | L 7–10 | 37,529 | |
| October 30 | No. 4 Alabama | Mississippi Veterans Memorial Stadium; Jackson, MS (rivalry) | L 10–41 | 40,500 | |
| November 6 | at No. 5 Auburn | Cliff Hare Stadium; Auburn, AL | L 21–30 | 45,000 | |
| November 13 | No. 20 LSU | Mississippi Veterans Memorial Stadium; Jackson, MS (rivalry) | L 3–28 | 35,000 | |
| November 25 | No. 18 Ole Miss | Scott Field; Starkville, MS (Egg Bowl) | L 0–48 | 35,000 | |
*Non-conference game; Rankings from AP Poll released prior to the game
