= List of Philadelphia Eagles first-round draft picks =

The Philadelphia Eagles, a professional American football team based in Philadelphia, joined the National Football League (NFL) in 1933 as a replacement team for the Frankford Yellow Jackets, after the Yellow Jackets went bankrupt and ceased operations. After the AFL–NFL merger in 1970, the Eagles were moved to the current NFC East division. Every April, each NFL franchise adds new players to its roster through a collegiate draft at the "NFL Annual Player Selection Meeting", more commonly known as the NFL Draft. Teams are ranked in inverse order based on their previous season's records, with the worst record picking first, the second-worst picking second, and so on. Two exceptions to this order are made for teams that played in the previous Super Bowl: the Super Bowl champion picks last (32nd), and the Super Bowl loser picks next to last (31st). Teams often trade their picks to other teams for different picks, players, cash, or combinations thereof; thus, it is not uncommon for a team's actual draft pick to differ from its assigned pick, or for a team to have extra or no draft picks in a particular round.

The Eagles' first selection as an NFL team was Jay Berwanger, a running back from University of Chicago. The Eagles have selected number one overall three times, including Berwanger in 1936, Sam Francis in 1937, and Chuck Bednarik in 1949, second overall five times, and third overall three times. Three eventual Hall of Famers have been selected by the Eagles: Steve Van Buren, Bednarik, and Bob Brown. The team's most recent first-round choice was Makai Lemon, a wide receiver from USC.

== Key ==
B	Back	K	Kicker	NT	Nose tackle
C	Center	LB	Linebacker	FB	Fullback
DB	Defensive back	P	Punter	HB	Halfback
DE	Defensive end	QB	Quarterback	WR	Wide receiver
DT	Defensive tackle	RB	Running back	G	Guard
E	End	T	Offensive tackle	TE	Tight end
^	Enshrined in the Pro Football Hall of Fame				
*	Selected number one overall				
†	Indicates the player was selected for the Pro Bowl				

== Player selections ==
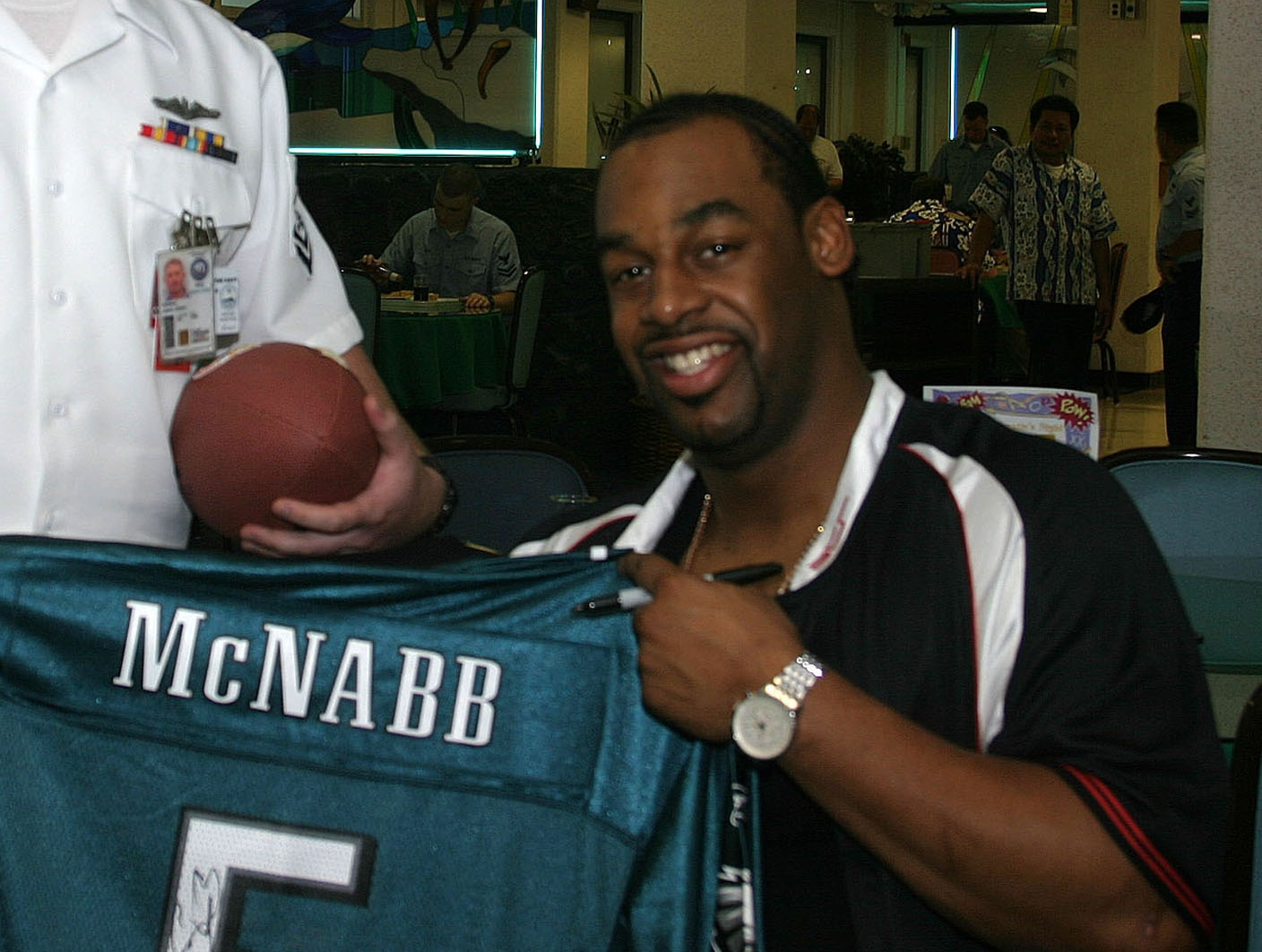
Eagles 1999 1st round draft pick Donovan McNabb

Philadelphia Eagles first-round draft picks
Year	Pick	Player name	Position	College	Notes
1936	1	Jay Berwanger*	RB	Chicago	
1937	1	Sam Francis*	FB	Nebraska	
1938	2	Jim McDonald	HB	Ohio State	
1939	4	Davey O'Brien †	QB	TCU	
1940	2	George McAfee †^	HB	Duke	
1941	No Pick				^{[a]}
1942	3	Pete Kmetovic	HB	Stanford	
1943	2	Joe Muha	FB	VMI	
1944	5	Steve Van Buren†^	HB	LSU	
1945	9	John Yonaker	DE	Notre Dame	
1946	7	Leo Riggs	HB	USC	
1947	8	Neill Armstrong	DE	Oklahoma A&M	
1948	8	Clyde Scott	HB	Arkansas	
1949	1	Chuck Bednarik^*†	C	Penn	^{[b]}
1949	9	Frank Tripucka	QB	Notre Dame	
1950	14	Bud Grant	DE	Minnesota	
1951	7	Ebert Van Buren	FB	LSU	
1951	8	Chet Mutryn	FB	Xavier	^{[c]}
1952	5	Johnny Bright	FB	Drake	
1953	No Pick				^{[d]}
1954	9	Neil Worden	FB	Notre Dame	
1955	9	Dick Bielski †	FB	Maryland	
1956	4	Bob Pellegrini	LB	Maryland	
1957	7	Clarence Peaks	FB	Michigan State	
1958	6	Walt Kowalczyk	FB	Michigan State	
1959	No Pick				^{[e]}
1960	9	Ron Burton	RB	Northwestern	
1961	14	Art Baker	FB	Syracuse	
1962	No Pick				^{[f]}
1963	4	Ed Budde †	T	Michigan State	
1964	2	Bob Brown†^	T	Nebraska	
1965	No Pick				^{[g]}
1966	4	Randy Beisler	T	Indiana	
1967	19	Harry Jones	RB	Arkansas	
1968	14	Tim Rossovich †	DE	USC	
1969	3	Leroy Keyes	RB	Purdue	
1970	6	Steve Zabel	LB	Oklahoma	
1971	5	Richard Harris	DE	Grambling	
1972	14	John Reaves	QB	Florida	
1973	3	Jerry Sisemore †	T	Texas	
1973	6	Charle Young †	TE	USC	
1974	No Pick				^{[h]}
1975	No Pick				^{[h]}
1976	No Pick				^{[i]}
1977	No Pick				^{[j]}
1978	No Pick				^{[j]}
1979	21	Jerry Robinson †	LB	UCLA	
1980	23	Roynell Young †	DB	Alcorn State	
1981	27	Leonard Mitchell	DE	Houston	
1982	20	Mike Quick †	WR	North Carolina State	
1983	8	Michael Haddix	RB	Mississippi State	
1984	4	Kenny Jackson	WR	Penn State	
1985	9	Kevin Allen	T	Indiana	
1986	10	Keith Byars †	RB	Ohio State	
1987	9	Jerome Brown †	DT	Miami(FL)	
1988	13	Keith Jackson †	TE	Oklahoma	
1989	No Pick				^{[k]}
1990	22	Ben Smith	DB	Georgia	
1991	8	Antone Davis	T	Tennessee	
1992	No Pick				^{[l]}
1993	19	Lester Holmes	G	Jackson State	^{[m]}
1993	24	Leonard Renfro	DT	Colorado	
1994	14	Bernard Williams	T	Georgia	–
1995	7	Mike Mamula	DE	Boston College	^{[n]}
1996	25	Jermane Mayberry †	T	Texas A&M–Kingsville	
1997	25	Jon Harris	DE	Virginia	^{[o]}
1998	11	Tra Thomas †	T	Florida State	
1999	2	Donovan McNabb †	QB	Syracuse	
2000	6	Corey Simon †	DT	Florida State	
2001	25	Freddie Mitchell	WR	UCLA	
2002	26	Lito Sheppard †	CB	Florida	
2003	15	Jerome McDougle	DE	Miami(FL)	^{[p]}
2004	16	Shawn Andrews †	T	Arkansas	^{[q]}
2005	31	Mike Patterson	DT	USC	
2006	14	Brodrick Bunkley	DT	Florida State	
2007	No Pick				^{[r]}
2008	No Pick				^{[s]}
2009	19	Jeremy Maclin †	WR	Missouri	^{[t]}
2010	13	Brandon Graham †	DE	Michigan	^{[u]}
2011	23	Danny Watkins	G	Baylor	^{[u]}
2012	12	Fletcher Cox †	DT	Mississippi State	^{[v]}
2013	4	Lane Johnson †	T	Oklahoma	
2014	26	Marcus Smith	DE	Louisville	
2015	20	Nelson Agholor	WR	USC	
2016	2	Carson Wentz †	QB	North Dakota State	
2017	14	Derek Barnett	DE	Tennessee	
2018	No Pick				^{[w]}
2019	22	Andre Dillard	T	Washington State	^{[x]}
2020	21	Jalen Reagor	WR	TCU	
2021	10	DeVonta Smith	WR	Alabama	
2022	13	Jordan Davis	DT	Georgia	
2023	9	Jalen Carter †	DT	Georgia	^{[y]}
2023	30	Nolan Smith	LB	Georgia	
2024	22	Quinyon Mitchell	CB	Toledo	
2025	31	Jihaad Campbell	LB	Alabama	
2026	20	Makai Lemon	WR	USC	

== Footnotes ==
- ^{a} The 1941 pick was traded to the Chicago Bears.
- ^{b} This was a lottery bonus pick.
- ^{c} The Eagles obtained this choice from Detroit.
- ^{d} Eagles traded their 1953 first-round pick to Los Angeles Rams.
- ^{e} Eagles traded their 1959 first-round pick to Los Angeles Rams for Norm Van Brocklin.
- ^{f} Eagles traded their 1962 first-round pick to St. Louis Cardinals for King Hill.
- ^{g} Eagles traded their 1965 first-round pick along with Lee Roy Caffey to Green Bay Packers for Jim Ringo and Earl Gros.
- ^{h} Eagles traded their 1974 first-round pick and 1975 first and third-round picks to Los Angeles Rams for Roman Gabriel.
- ^{i} The Eagles traded the 1976 first-round pick to Cincinnati Bengals for Mike Boryla.
- ^{j} Eagles traded their 1977 first-round and 1978 1st- and 2nd-round draft picks to Cincinnati for Bill Bergey.
- ^{k} The Eagles traded the 1989 draft pick to Indianapolis Colts for Ron Solt.
- ^{l} Eagles traded their 1991 and 1992 first-round draft picks to Green Bay, for Green Bay's 1991 first-round pick.
- ^{m} The Eagles had obtained a 1993 first-round pick (13th overall) from NFL as compensation for the departure of Reggie White. Eagles then traded this to Houston for their first pick plus their third-round selection.
- ^{n} The 1995 pick was obtained from Tampa Bay in exchange for Eagles' 1995 first-round pick (12th overall) in the first round and picks 43 and 63 in the 2nd round; Eagles also received Tampa's third-round pick (72nd pick overall) in 1995.
- ^{o} In 1997 Eagles traded their first-round pick (22nd overall) to Dallas in exchange for the Cowboys’ 1997 first-round pick (25th overall), 1997 fifth-round pick (155th overall) and the Cowboys' best 1998 third-round pick.
- ^{p} The 2003 first-round choice (15th pick overall) was obtained from San Diego in exchange for Eagles' 2003 first-round pick (30th pick overall), and 2003 second-round pick (62nd pick overall). That second-round pick was acquired from Green Bay for CB Al Harris and a fourth-round pick in 2003.
- ^{q} The 2004 first-round draft choice (16th pick overall) was obtained from San Francisco for Eagles' 2004 first-round pick (28th pick overall) and the 2004 second-round pick (58th pick overall).
- ^{r} Eagles traded their 2007 first-round pick (26th overall, used to select Anthony Spencer) to Dallas for the Cowboys' first second-round selection (36th overall, acquired from Cleveland in a trade, used to select Kevin Kolb), their third-round selection (87th overall, used to select Stewart Bradley), and their fifth-round selection (159th overall, used to select C.J. Gaddis).
- ^{s} Eagles traded their 2008 first-round selection (19th overall) to Carolina for Carolina's 2008 second- and fourth-round selections (43rd and 109th), and Carolina's 2009 first-round pick.
- ^{t} Eagles traded their 2009 first-round selection (21st overall) and sixth-round selection to Cleveland for Cleveland's 2009 first-round selection (19th overall), used to select Jeremy Maclin.
- ^{u} Eagles traded their 2010 first-round selection (24th overall) and two third-round selections (70th and 87th overall) to Denver for Denver's 2010 first-round selection (13th overall), used to select Brandon Graham.
- ^{v} Eagles traded their 2012 first-round selection (15th overall), fourth-round selection (114th overall), and sixth-round selection (172nd overall) to Seattle for Seattle's 2012 first-round selection (12th overall), used to select Fletcher Cox.
- ^{w} Eagles traded their 2018 first- and fourth-round selections (32nd and 132nd overall) to Baltimore in exchange for their second- and fourth-round selections (52nd and 125th overall) and a second-round selection in 2019.
- ^{x} Eagles traded their 2019 first, fourth, and sixth-round selections (25th, 127th, and 197th overall) to Baltimore for Baltimore's first-round selection (22nd overall), used to select Andre Dillard.
- ^{y} Eagles traded their 2023 first-round (10th overall) and their 2024 fourth-round pick to Chicago in exchange for their first-round selection (9th overall), used to select Jalen Carter.
- ^{z} Philadelphia traded their 2026 first- and two fourth-round selections (23rd, 114th and 137th overall) in exchange for Dallas' 2026 first-round selection (20th overall) and a 2027 seventh-round selection.
