= 1971 Vanderbilt Commodores football team =

American college football season

1971 Vanderbilt Commodores football
- Conference: Southeastern Conference
- Record: 4–6–1 (1–5 SEC)
- Head coach: Bill Pace (5th season)
- Home stadium: Dudley Field

1971 Southeastern Conference football standings
	Conf.					Overall
Team	W		L		T	W		L		T
No. 4 Alabama $	7	–	0	–	0	11	–	1	–	0
No. 7 Georgia	5	–	1	–	0	11	–	1	–	0
No. 12 Auburn	5	–	1	–	0	9	–	2	–	0
No. 15 Ole Miss	4	–	2	–	0	10	–	2	–	0
No. 9 Tennessee	4	–	2	–	0	10	–	2	–	0
No. 11 LSU	3	–	2	–	0	9	–	3	–	0
Vanderbilt	1	–	5	–	0	4	–	6	–	1
Florida	1	–	6	–	0	4	–	7	–	0
Kentucky	1	–	6	–	0	3	–	8	–	0
Mississippi State	1	–	7	–	0	2	–	9	–	0
$ – Conference champion; Rankings from AP Poll

The 1971 Vanderbilt Commodores football team represented Vanderbilt University in the 1971 NCAA University Division football season. The Commodores were led by head coach Bill Pace in his fifth season and finished the season with a record of four wins, six losses and one tie (4–6–1 overall, 1–5 in the SEC).

== Schedule ==
Date	Time	Opponent	Site	Result	Attendance	Source
September 11		Chattanooga*	Dudley Field; Nashville, TN	W 20–19	14,629	
September 18	7:32 p.m.	Louisville*	Dudley Field; Nashville, TN	T 0–0	18,700	
September 25		at Mississippi State	Scott Field; Starkville, MS	W 49–19	29,000	
October 2		at Virginia*	Scott Stadium; Charlottesville, VA	L 23–27	12,500	
October 9		No. 6 Alabama	Dudley Field; Nashville, TN	L 0–42	34,000	
October 16		No. 8 Georgia	Dudley Field; Nashville, TN (rivalry)	L 0–24	16,000	
October 23		at Ole Miss	Hemingway Stadium; Oxford, MS (rivalry)	L 7–28	27,500	
October 30		at Tulane*	Tulane Stadium; New Orleans, LA	W 13–9	17,941	
November 6		Kentucky	Dudley Field; Nashville, TN (rivalry)	L 7–14	19,833	
November 20		Tampa*	Dudley Field; Nashville, TN	W 10–7	9,977–12,000	
November 27		at No. 11 Tennessee	Neyland Stadium; Knoxville, TN (rivalry)	L 7–19	56,244	
*Non-conference game; Rankings from AP Poll released prior to the game; All times are in Central time

== Roster ==
1971 Vanderbilt Commodores football team roster
Players
Coaches
Offense

Pos.	#	Name	Class
QB	10	Steve Burger	Jr

Defense

Pos.	#	Name	Class
DT	77	Mark Ilgenfritz	So
DB	25	Doug Nettles	So
DB	23	Ken Stone	Jr

Special teams

Pos.	#	Name	Class

Head coach

- Bill Pace

Coordinators/assistant coaches

Legend

- (C) Team captain
- (S) Suspended
- (I) Ineligible
- Injured
- Redshirt
