= 1971 Tennessee Volunteers football team =

American college football season

1971 Tennessee Volunteers football

Liberty Bowl champion

Liberty Bowl, W 14–13 vs. Arkansas
- Conference: Southeastern Conference

Ranking
- Coaches: No. 9
- AP: No. 9
- Record: 10–2 (4–2 SEC)
- Head coach: Bill Battle (2nd season)
- Captain: Jackie Walker
- Home stadium: Neyland Stadium

1971 Southeastern Conference football standings
	Conf.					Overall
Team	W		L		T	W		L		T
No. 4 Alabama $	7	–	0	–	0	11	–	1	–	0
No. 7 Georgia	5	–	1	–	0	11	–	1	–	0
No. 12 Auburn	5	–	1	–	0	9	–	2	–	0
No. 15 Ole Miss	4	–	2	–	0	10	–	2	–	0
No. 9 Tennessee	4	–	2	–	0	10	–	2	–	0
No. 11 LSU	3	–	2	–	0	9	–	3	–	0
Vanderbilt	1	–	5	–	0	4	–	6	–	1
Florida	1	–	6	–	0	4	–	7	–	0
Kentucky	1	–	6	–	0	3	–	8	–	0
Mississippi State	1	–	7	–	0	2	–	9	–	0
$ – Conference champion; Rankings from AP Poll

The 1971 Tennessee Volunteers football team (variously "Tennessee", "UT" or the "Vols") represented the University of Tennessee in the 1971 NCAA University Division football season. Playing as a member of the Southeastern Conference (SEC), the team was led by head coach Bill Battle, in his second year, and played their home games at Neyland Stadium in Knoxville, Tennessee. They finished the season with a record of ten wins and two losses (10–2 overall, 4–2 in the SEC) and a victory over Arkansas in the 1971 Liberty Bowl.

== Schedule ==
Date	Opponent	Rank	Site	TV	Result	Attendance	Source
September 18	UC Santa Barbara*	No. 8	Neyland Stadium; Knoxville, TN		W 48–6	65,114	
September 25	No. 5 Auburn	No. 9	Neyland Stadium; Knoxville, TN (rivalry)	ABC	L 9–10	62,990	
October 2	at Florida	No. 12	Florida Field; Gainesville, FL (rivalry)		W 20–13	61,112	
October 9	Georgia Tech*	No. 13	Neyland Stadium; Knoxville, TN (rivalry)		W 10–6	63,671	
October 16	at No. 4 Alabama	No. 14	Legion Field; Birmingham, AL (Third Saturday in October)		L 15–32	73,828	
October 23	vs. Mississippi State	No. 18	Memphis Memorial Stadium; Memphis, TN		W 10–7	37,529	
October 30	Tulsa*	No. 16	Neyland Stadium; Knoxville, TN		W 38–3	62,513	
November 6	South Carolina*^{†}	No. 11	Neyland Stadium; Knoxville, TN (rivalry)		W 35–6	63,507	
November 20	at Kentucky	No. 11	McLean Stadium; Lexington, KY (rivalry)		W 21–7	35,000	
November 27	Vanderbilt	No. 11	Neyland Stadium; Knoxville, TN (rivalry)		W 19–7	56,244	
December 4	No. 5 Penn State*	No. 12	Neyland Stadium; Knoxville, TN	ABC	W 31–11	59,542	
December 20	vs. No. 18 Arkansas*	No. 9	Memphis Memorial Stadium; Memphis, TN (Liberty Bowl)	ABC	W 14–13	51,410	
*Non-conference game; ^{†}Homecoming; Rankings from AP Poll released prior to the game

== Game summaries ==
=== At Florida ===
#12 Tennessee Volunteers at Florida Gators

Quarter	1	2	3	4	Total
Tennessee	3	10	7	0	20
Florida	0	13	0	0	13

at Florida Field, Gainesville, Florida

- Date: October 2, 1971
- Game attendance: 61,112
- New York Times, 1971 Oct 03.

Game information

First quarter

- TENN – George Hunt 33-yard field goal. Tennessee 3–0. Drive:

Second quarter

- TENN – George Hunt 34-yard field goal. Tennessee 6–0. Drive:
- TENN – Curt Watson 8-yard run (George Hunt kick). Tennessee 13–0. Drive: 74 yards.
- FLA – Willie Jackson 23-yard pass from John Reaves (kick failed), 2:12. Tennessee 13–6. Drive:
- FLA – Hank Foldberg 7-yard pass from John Reaves (Richard Franco kick). Tie 13–13. Drive:

Third quarter

- TENN – Stan Trott 20-yard pass from Phil Pierce (George Hunt kick). Tennessee 20–13. Drive: 99 yards.

Top passers

- TENN
- FLA – John Reaves – 19/40, 213 yards, 2 TD, INT

Top rushers

- TENN
- FLA – Mike Rich – 9 rushes, 80 yards

Top receivers

- TENN
- FLA – Willie Jackson – 7 receptions, 93 yards, TD

Third-string quarterback Phil Pierce led Tennessee on a 99-yard drive in the third quarter, capped by a 20-yard touchdown pass to Stan Trott to take the lead for good. The Volunteers lost their first and second-string quarterbacks to knee injuries during the game.

=== Penn State ===
#5 Penn State Nittany Lions (10–0) at #12 Tennessee Volunteers (8–2)

Quarter	1	2	3	4	Total
Penn St	0	3	0	8	11
Tennessee	7	14	0	10	31

at Neyland Stadium, Knoxville, Tennessee

- Date: December 4, 1971
- Game attendance: 54,529
- TV announcers (ABC): Chris Schenkel, Bud Wilkinson
- Ocala Star-Banner, 1971 Dec 05.

Game information
First quarter
- TENN – Conrad Graham 76-yard fumble return (George Hunt kick). Tennessee 7–0.

Second quarter

- PSU – Alberto Vitello 27-yard field goal. Tennessee 7–3. Drive:
- TENN – Bill Rudder 1-yard run (George Hunt kick). Tennessee 14–3. Drive: 5 plays, 15 yards.
- TENN – Bobby Majors 44-yard punt return (George Hunt kick). Tennessee 21–3.

Fourth quarter

- TENN – George Hunt 21-yard field goal. Tennessee 24–3. Drive:
- TENN – Jackie Walker 43-yard interception return (George Hunt kick). Tennessee 31–3.
- PSU – Lydell Mitchell 14-yard pass from John Hufnagel (run good). Tennessee 31–11. Drive:

Before the game, Bobby Majors was honored alongside his brothers, Iowa State head coach Johnny and the late Billy, for the family's overall contribution to the school's football program. Majors finished his final home game with 195 return yards on kicks and punts. With the win, the Volunteers accepted a bid to play in the Liberty Bowl against Arkansas.

== Personnel ==
1971 Tennessee Volunteers football team roster
Players
Coaches
Offense

Pos.	#	Name	Class
OL	76	Joe Balthrop
QB	21	Dennis Chadwick
RB		Steve Chancey
OL	64	Bill Emendorfer
G	65	Phillip Fulmer	Sr
OL	73	Gaylon Hill
WR		Chip Howard
OL		Tom Johnson
TE	84	Sonny Leach
WR		Emmon Love
QB	16	Jim Maxwell
QB		Phil Pierce
FB		Bill Rudder
RB		George Silvey
RB		Haskel Stanback
TE	20	Gary Theiler
WR		Joe Thompson
WR		Stan Trott
RB		Curt Watson
TE		Jimmy Young

Defense

Pos.	#	Name	Class
DB	13	David Allen	Jr
DL	86	Tom Bennett	Sr
DB		Eddie Brown
CB		Conrad Graham
DL		Frank Howell
DL		Carl Johnson
DE		Ken Lambert
S	44	Bobby Majors	Sr
LB	58	Ray Nettles	Sr
LB		Jamie Rotella
DE		Claude Simonton
DB		Tim Townes
DL		John Wagster
OLB		Jackie Walker (C)	Sr

Special teams

Pos.	#	Name	Class
K	9	George Hunt	Sr

Head coach

- Bill Battle

Coordinators/assistant coaches

Legend

- (C) Team captain
- (S) Suspended
- (I) Ineligible
- Injured
- Redshirt

== Team players drafted into the NFL ==
Player	Position	Round	Pick	NFL club
Bobby Majors	Defensive back	3	76	Philadelphia Eagles
George Hunt	Kicker	5	122	Cleveland Browns
Jackie Walker	Linebacker	6	148	San Francisco 49ers
Curt Watson	Running back	6	150	New Orleans Saints
Ray Nettles	Linebacker	6	155	Miami Dolphins
Gary Theiler	Tight end	12	308	Baltimore Colts
Joe Balthrop	Guard	16	397	New Orleans Saints
