= 1971 Kentucky Wildcats football team =

American college football season

1971 Kentucky Wildcats football
- Conference: Southeastern Conference
- Record: 3–8 (1–6 SEC)
- Head coach: John Ray (3rd season)
- Home stadium: McLean Stadium

1971 Southeastern Conference football standings
	Conf.					Overall
Team	W		L		T	W		L		T
No. 4 Alabama $	7	–	0	–	0	11	–	1	–	0
No. 7 Georgia	5	–	1	–	0	11	–	1	–	0
No. 12 Auburn	5	–	1	–	0	9	–	2	–	0
No. 15 Ole Miss	4	–	2	–	0	10	–	2	–	0
No. 9 Tennessee	4	–	2	–	0	10	–	2	–	0
No. 11 LSU	3	–	2	–	0	9	–	3	–	0
Vanderbilt	1	–	5	–	0	4	–	6	–	1
Florida	1	–	6	–	0	4	–	7	–	0
Kentucky	1	–	6	–	0	3	–	8	–	0
Mississippi State	1	–	7	–	0	2	–	9	–	0
$ – Conference champion; Rankings from AP Poll

The 1971 Kentucky Wildcats football team represented the University of Kentucky as a member of the Southeastern Conference (SEC) during the 1971 NCAA University Division football season. Led by third-year head coach John Ray, the Wildcats compiled an overall record of 3–8, with a mark of 1–6 in conference play, and finished tied for eighth in the SEC.

== Schedule ==
Date	Time	Opponent	Site	Result	Attendance	Source
September 11		at Clemson*	Memorial Stadium; Clemson, SC	W 13–10	34,000	
September 18		at Indiana*	Seventeenth Street Stadium; Bloomington, IN (rivalry)	L 8–26	41,954	
September 25		Ole Miss	McLean Stadium; Lexington, KY	L 20–34	37,500	
October 2		at No. 5 Auburn	Cliff Hare Stadium; Auburn, AL	L 6–38	48,000	
October 9	7:58 p.m.	Ohio*	McLean Stadium; Lexington, KY	L 6–35	30,000	
October 16		No. 12 LSU	McLean Stadium; Lexington, KY	L 13–17	30,000	
October 23		at No. 8 Georgia	Sanford Stadium; Athens, GA	L 0–34	57,852	
October 30		Virginia Tech*	McLean Stadium; Lexington, KY	W 33–27	37,000	
November 6		at Vanderbilt	Dudley Field; Nashville, TN (rivalry)	W 14–7	19,833	
November 13		at Florida	Florida Field; Gainesville, FL (rivalry)	L 24–35	45,268	
November 20		No. 11 Tennessee	McLean Stadium; Lexington, KY (rivalry)	L 7–21	35,000	
*Non-conference game; Rankings from AP Poll released prior to the game; All times are in Eastern time

== Roster ==
1971 Kentucky Wildcats football team roster
Players
Coaches
Offense

Pos.	#	Name	Class
[[American football positions|]]
[[American football positions|]]

Defense

Pos.	#	Name	Class
[[American football positions|]]

Special teams

Pos.	#	Name	Class

Head coach

- Fran Curci

Coordinators/assistant coaches

Legend

- (C) Team captain
- (S) Suspended
- (I) Ineligible
- Injured
- Redshirt
