= 1971 Florida Gators football team =

American college football season

1971 Florida Gators football
- Conference: Southeastern Conference
- Record: 4–7 (1–6 SEC)
- Head coach: Doug Dickey (2nd season)
- Offensive coordinator: Jimmy Dunn (2nd season)
- Defensive coordinator: Doug Knotts (2nd season)
- Captains: Harvin Clark; Tommy Durrance; John Reaves
- Home stadium: Florida Field

1971 Southeastern Conference football standings
	Conf.					Overall
Team	W		L		T	W		L		T
No. 4 Alabama $	7	–	0	–	0	11	–	1	–	0
No. 7 Georgia	5	–	1	–	0	11	–	1	–	0
No. 12 Auburn	5	–	1	–	0	9	–	2	–	0
No. 15 Ole Miss	4	–	2	–	0	10	–	2	–	0
No. 9 Tennessee	4	–	2	–	0	10	–	2	–	0
No. 11 LSU	3	–	2	–	0	9	–	3	–	0
Vanderbilt	1	–	5	–	0	4	–	6	–	1
Florida	1	–	6	–	0	4	–	7	–	0
Kentucky	1	–	6	–	0	3	–	8	–	0
Mississippi State	1	–	7	–	0	2	–	9	–	0
$ – Conference champion; Rankings from AP Poll

The 1971 Florida Gators football team represented the University of Florida during the 1971 NCAA University Division football season. The season was Doug Dickey's second as the head coach of the Florida Gators football team. Dickey's 1971 Florida Gators finished with a 4–7 overall record and a 1–6 record in the Southeastern Conference (SEC), tying for eighth among ten SEC teams.

== Schedule ==
Date	Opponent	Site	Result	Attendance	Source
September 11	vs. Duke*	Tampa Stadium; Tampa, FL	L 6–12	51,477	
September 18	at Mississippi State	Mississippi Veterans Memorial Stadium; Jackson, MS	L 10–13	33,500	
September 25	No. 8 Alabama	Florida Field; Gainesville, FL (rivalry)	L 0–38	61,832	
October 2	No. 12 Tennessee	Florida Field; Gainesville, FL (rivalry)	L 13–20	61,112	
October 9	at No. 16 LSU	Tiger Stadium; Baton Rouge, LA (rivalry)	L 7–48	67,055	
October 16	No. 19 Florida State*	Florida Field; Gainesville, FL (rivalry)	W 17–15	65,109	
October 23	Maryland*^{†}	Florida Field; Gainesville, FL	W 27–23	53,021	
October 30	at No. 5 Auburn	Cliff Hare Stadium; Auburn, AL (rivalry)	L 7–40	63,500	
November 6	vs. No. 7 Georgia	Gator Bowl Stadium; Jacksonville, FL (rivalry)	L 7–49	67,383	
November 13	Kentucky	Florida Field; Gainesville, FL (rivalry)	W 35–24	45,268	
November 27	at Miami (FL)*	Miami Orange Bowl; Miami, FL (rivalry)	W 45–16	37,710	
*Non-conference game; ^{†}Homecoming; Rankings from AP Poll released prior to the game

== Personnel ==
1971 Florida Gators football team roster
Players
Coaches
Offense

Pos.	#	Name	Class
G	68	Fred Abbott	Jr
WR		Larry Adams
WR	45	Carlos Alvarez	Sr
OT	74	Kris Anderson	So
WR	89	Hollis Boardman	So
G	79	Bill Dowdy	Sr
RB	33	Tommy Durrance (C)	Sr
TE	81	Hank Foldberg	So
QB	10	Chan Gailey	So
WR	21	Bruce Gunter	Sr
G	69	Dale Hutcherson	So
WR	22	Willie Jackson	Jr
FB	20	Vince Kendrick	So
C	55	Richard Kensler	Sr
C	51	Mark King	So
RB	36	Lenny Lucas	So
WR	44	Joel Parker	So
OT	76	David Peek	Sr
QB	7	John Reaves (C)	Sr
FB	40	Mike Rich	Sr
QB	9	John Schnelby	Sr
G	62	Joe Sheppard	So
TE	87	Jim Yancy	Sr

Defense

Pos.	#	Name	Class
S	16	Jimmy Barr	Jr
ILB	50	Ricky Browne	So
DE	88	Richard Buchanan	Sr
CB	38	Harvin Clark (C)	Sr
S	34	John Clifford	Jr
DB	43	John Faix	Sr
MG	72	Len Fuller	Sr
CB	23	Leonard George	Jr
LB		Jan Gowland
DT	77	Robert Harrell	Sr
MG	65	David Hitchcock	So
DL	75	Eddy Moore	Jr
DE	85	Mike Moore	So
OLB	57	David Poff	Jr
DB	35	John Silman	Jr
CB	28	Doug Sorensen	Sr

Special teams

Pos.	#	Name	Class
K	8	Richard Franco	Sr

Head coach

- Doug Dickey

Coordinators/assistant coaches

Legend

- (C) Team captain
- (S) Suspended
- (I) Ineligible
- Injured
- Redshirt

Roster

== Game summaries ==
=== Duke ===
Team	1	2	3	4	Total
• Duke	6	3	0	3	12
Florida	0	0	6	0	6

- Date: September 11
- Location: Tampa Stadium, Tampa, Florida
- Game attendance: 51,477

Scoring summary
1	DUKE	Wright 44 yard field goal	DUKE 3-0
1	DUKE	Wright 22 yard field goal	DUKE 6-0
2	DUKE	Wright 34 yard field goal	DUKE 9-0
3	FLA	Parker 7 yard pass from Reaves (kick blocked)	DUKE 9-6
4	DUKE	Wright 43 yard field goal	DUKE 12-6

=== Mississippi State ===
Team	1	2	3	4	Total
Florida	0	10	0	0	10
• Mississippi State	3	0	7	3	13

- Date: September 18
- Location: Veterans Memorial Stadium, Jackson, Mississippi
- Game attendance: 33,500

Scoring summary
1		MSU	Ellis 29 yard field goal	MSU 3-0
2		FLA	Yancey 5 yard pass from Reaves (Franco kick)	FLA 7-3
2	0:00	FLA	Franco 52 yard field goal	FLA 10-3
3		MSU	Jones 21 yard run (Ellis kick)	Tied 10-10
4		MSU	Ellis 35 yard field goal	MSU 13-10

=== Alabama ===
Team	1	2	3	4	Total
• #8 Alabama	10	14	7	7	38
Florida	0	0	0	0	0

- Date: September 25
- Location: Florida Field
  Gainesville, Florida
- Game attendance: 61,832

Against the Gators, Alabama's Johnny Musso scored four rushing touchdowns en route to a 38–0 shutout at Florida Field. After Bill Davis gave the Crimson Tide a 3–0 lead with his first quarter field goal, Musso scored Alabama's next four touchdowns and extended their lead to 31–0. All four came on the ground with a pair from one-yard out, a three-yard run and a five-yard run. Alabama then closed the game with an 11-yard Billy Sexton touchdown pass to Dexter Wood that made the final score 38–0.

The four touchdowns scored by Musso on the ground set a new school record for rushing touchdowns. Additionally, the shutout was the first for the Crimson Tide defense since their 17–0 victory in 1967 over South Carolina.

=== Tennessee ===
#12 Tennessee Volunteers at Florida Gators

Quarter	1	2	3	4	Total
Tennessee	3	10	7	0	20
Florida	0	13	0	0	13

at Florida Field, Gainesville, Florida

- Date: October 2, 1971
- Game attendance: 61,112
- New York Times, 1971 Oct 03.

Game information

First quarter

- TENN – George Hunt 33-yard field goal. Tennessee 3–0. Drive:

Second quarter

- TENN – George Hunt 34-yard field goal. Tennessee 6–0. Drive:
- TENN – Curt Watson 8-yard run (George Hunt kick). Tennessee 13–0. Drive: 74 yards.
- FLA – Willie Jackson 23-yard pass from John Reaves (kick failed), 2:12. Tennessee 13–6. Drive:
- FLA – Hank Foldberg 7-yard pass from John Reaves (Richard Franco kick). Tie 13–13. Drive:

Third quarter

- TENN – Stan Trott 20-yard pass from Phil Pierce (George Hunt kick). Tennessee 20–13. Drive: 99 yards.

Top passers

- TENN
- FLA – John Reaves – 19/40, 213 yards, 2 TD, INT

Top rushers

- TENN
- FLA – Mike Rich – 9 rushes, 80 yards

Top receivers

- TENN
- FLA – Willie Jackson – 7 receptions, 93 yards, TD

=== Florida State ===
Florida State Seminoles at Florida Gators

Quarter	1	2	3	4	Total
Florida St	0	0	0	15	15
Florida	0	14	0	3	17

at Florida Field, Gainesville, Florida

- Date: October 16, 1971
- Game weather: Overcast
- Game attendance: 65,109
- Recap/Box Score

Game information

Second quarter

- FLA – Mike Rich 1-yard run (kick failed), 14:58. Florida 6–0. Drive: 75 yards.
- FLA – Jimmy Barr 26-yard fumble return (pass good), 14:40. Florida 14–0.

Fourth quarter

- FSU – Paul Magalski 3-yard run (Frank Fontes kick), 13:57. Florida 14–7. Drive: 73 yards.
- FLA – Richard Franco 42-yard field goal, 9:19. Florida 17–7. Drive:
- FSU – Rhett Dawson 6-yard pass from Gary Huff (pass good), 3:02. Florida 17–15. Drive:

Top passers

- FSU – Gary Huff – 22/40, 198 yards, TD
- FLA – John Reaves – 4/11, 44 yards

Top rushers

- FSU – Art Munroe – 17 rushes, 79 yards
- FLA – Tommy Durrance – 15 rushes, 60 yards

Top receivers

- FSU – Rhett Dawson – 7 receptions, 90 yards, TD
- FLA – Willie Jackson – 1 reception, 28 yards

=== Maryland ===
Team	1	2	3	4	Total
Maryland	0	13	10	0	23
• Florida	7	6	7	7	27

- Date: October 23
- Location: Florida Field, Gainesville, Florida
- Game attendance: 53,021

Scoring summary
1	FLA	Durrance 7 yard pass from Reaves (Franco kick)	FLA 7-0
2	MD	Behbahani 23 yard field goal	FLA 7-3
2	FLA	Boardman 24 yard pass from Reaves (kick failed)	FLA 13-3
2	MD	Behbahani 36 yard field goal	FLA 13-6
2	MD	Bungori 4 yard pass from Neville (Behbahani kick)	Tied 13-13
3	MD	Behbahani 31 yard field goal	MD 16-13
3	FLA	Alvarez 16 yard pass from Reaves (Franco kick)	FLA 20-16
3	MD	Bungori 10 yard pass from Neville (Behbahani kick)	MD 23-20
4	FLA	Durrance 10 yard pass from Reaves (Franco kick)	FLA 27-23

=== Auburn ===
Team	1	2	3	4	Total
Florida	0	7	0	0	7
• Auburn	12	0	7	21	40

- Date: October 30
- Location: Cliff Hare Stadium, Auburn, Alabama
- Game attendance: 63,500

Scoring summary
1	AUB	Sullivan 8 yard run (run failed)	AUB 6-0
1	AUB	Sullivan 1 yard run (run failed)	AUB 12-0
2	FLA	Jackson 10 yard pass from Reaves (Franco kick)	AUB 12-7
3	AUB	Beasley 19 yard pass from Sullivan (Jett kick)	AUB 19-7
4	AUB	Unger 4 yard run (Jett kick)	AUB 26-7
4	AUB	Henley 1 yard run (Jett kick)	AUB 33-7
4	AUB	Beasley 14 yard pass from Sullivan (Jett kick)	AUB 40-7

=== Georgia ===
Team	1	2	3	4	Total
• Georgia	7	13	22	7	49
Florida	0	7	0	0	7

- Date: November 6
- Location: Gator Bowl, Jacksonville, Florida
- Game attendance: 67,383

Scoring summary
1	UGA	Poulos 1 yard run (Braswell kick)	UGA 7-0
2	UGA	Lake 2 yard run (Braswell kick)	UGA 14-0
2	UGA	Robinson 38 yard interception return (kick failed)	UGA 20-0
2	FLA	Yancey 9 yard pass from Reaves (Franco kick)	UGA 20-7
3	UGA	Ray 5 yard run (Ray to Shirer pass)	UGA 28-7
3	UGA	Shirer 38 yard pass from Ray (Braswell kick)	UGA 35-7
3	UGA	Lake 2 yard run (Braswell kick)	UGA 42-7
4	UGA	Burns 25 yard pass from Watson (Braswell kick)	UGA 49-7

=== Kentucky ===
Team	1	2	3	4	Total
Kentucky	0	3	7	14	24
• Florida	0	7	7	21	35

- Date: November 13
- Location: Florida Field, Gainesville, Florida
- Game attendance: 45,268

Scoring summary
2	FLA	Lucas 1 yard run (Franco kick)	FLA 7-0
2	KY	Kirk 21 yard field goal	FLA 7-3
3	KY	Clymer 11 yard run (Kirk kick)	KY 10-7
3	FLA	Reaves 1 yard run (Franco kick)	FLA 14-10
4	FLA	Yancey 10 yard pass from Reaves (Franco kick)	FLA 21-10
4	FLA	Alvarez 56 yard pass from Reaves (Franco kick)	FLA 28-10
4	KY	Fanuzzi 3 yard run (pass failed)	FLA 28-16
4	FLA	Durrance 19 yard pass from Reaves (Franco kick)	FLA 35-16
4	KY	Stephans 47 yard pass from Fanuzzi (Fanuzzi run)	FLA 35-24

=== Miami (FL) ===
Florida Gators at Miami (FL) Hurricanes

Quarter	1	2	3	4	Total
Florida	7	10	14	14	45
Miami (FL)	0	0	8	8	16

at Orange Bowl, Miami, Florida

- Date: November 27, 1971
- Game attendance: 37,710
- Box Score

The disappointing season ended on a controversial note. With the Gators leading the Miami Hurricanes 45–8 late in the fourth quarter of the last game of the season, senior quarterback John Reaves was just 14 yards short of the NCAA career record for passing yardage, but Miami had the ball and seemed destined to run out the clock. At the urging of Florida defensive captain Harvin Clark, Dickey agreed to permit the Gators defense to allow the Hurricanes to score, thus returning the ball to the Gators offense and giving Reaves a chance to break the record. Dubbed the "Florida Flop" or "Gator Flop", the move worked. When Miami snapped the ball from the Florida 8-yard line, the Gators instantly flopped to the turf, allowing Miami quarterback John Hornibrook to walk uncontested into the endzone. Florida's offense got one more possession, and Reeves promptly broke the record with a pass to favorite target Carlos Alvarez. After the game, many Gator players celebrated by jumping into the pool at the Orange Bowl's east end zone used by the Miami Dolphins' live mascot, Flipper.

Miami coach Fran Curci was so angered by the turn of events that he refused to shake Dickey's hand. In a post-game interview, he called the actions "bush league" and declared that "what Doug Dickey did shows absolutely no class."
