= 1972 Sugar Bowl =

The 1972 Sugar Bowl may refer to:

- 1972 Sugar Bowl (January) - January 1, 1972, game between the Oklahoma Sooners and the Auburn Tigers
- 1972 Sugar Bowl (December) - December 31, 1972, game between the Oklahoma Sooners and the Penn State Nittany Lions
