= Bill Pace =

American football player and coach (1932–1990)

Biographical details
- Born: February 14, 1932; Douthat, Oklahoma, U.S.
- Died: May 14, 1990 (aged 58); Nashville, Tennessee, U.S.

Playing career
- 1951–1953: Wichita State
- Position: Quarterback

Coaching career (HC unless noted)
- 1958–1961: Kansas (assistant)
- 1962–1966: Arkansas (assistant)
- 1967–1972: Vanderbilt
- 1973: Georgia Tech (offensive coordinator)
- 1974–1979: Georgia (assistant)
- 1980–1981: Tennessee (AHC/QB)

Administrative career (AD unless noted)
- 1971–1973: Vanderbilt

Head coaching record
- Overall: 22–38–3

Bill J. Pace (February 14, 1932 – May 14, 1990) was an American college football player and coach and athletics administrator. He served as the head football coach at Vanderbilt University from 1967 to 1972, compiling a record of 22–38–3. Pace also served as the athletic director at Vanderbilt from January 1, 1971, until he resigned on January 15, 1973. Pace was hired as the New England Patriots offensive backfield coach in February 1973, but left the team less than a week later to become the offensive coordinator at Georgia Tech. Beginning in 1974, Pace served as offensive coordinator under Vince Dooley at the University of Georgia installing the veer offense. Pace ended his coaching career as the assistant head coach and quarterbacks coach for Johnny Majors at the University of Tennessee in 1980 and 1981.

== Head coaching record ==
Year	Team	Overall	Conference	Standing	Bowl/playoffs
Vanderbilt Commodores (Southeastern Conference) (1967–1972)
1967	Vanderbilt	2–7–1	0–6	T–9th	
1968	Vanderbilt	5–4–1	2–3–1	8th	
1969	Vanderbilt	4–6	2–3	7th	
1970	Vanderbilt	4–7	1–5	9th	
1971	Vanderbilt	4–6–1	1–5	7th	
1972	Vanderbilt	3–8	0–6	10th	
Vanderbilt:		22–38–3	6–28–1		
Total:		22–38–3			
