= Dean Carlson =

American football player (1950–2022)

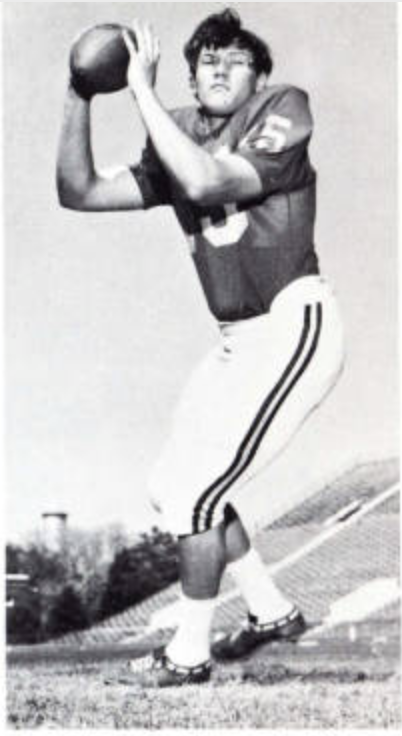
- Carlson with Iowa State in 1971

No. 9
- Position: Quarterback

Personal information
- Born: August 1, 1950; Rushford, Minnesota, U.S.
- Died: August 5, 2022 (aged 72); Clinton, North Carolina, U.S.
- Listed height: 6 ft 3 in (1.91 m)
- Listed weight: 210 lb (95 kg)

Career information
- High school: Rushford
- College: Iowa State
- NFL draft: 1972: 7th round, 179th overall pick

Career history
- Kansas City Chiefs (1972–1973)*; Green Bay Packers (1974)*; Kansas City Chiefs (1974)
- * Offseason or practice squad member only

Career NFL statistics
- TD–INT: 0–1
- Passing yards: 116
- Passer rating: 45.4
- Stats at Pro Football Reference

Dean Paul Carlson (August 1, 1950 – August 5, 2022) was an American professional football player who was a quarterback in the National Football League (NFL). He played college football for the Iowa State Cyclones.

== Early life ==
Carlson was born and grew up in Rushford, Minnesota, and attended Rushford High School, where he played football and basketball.

== College career ==
Carlson began his collegiate career at Rochester State Junior College and was named All-Region as a sophomore after leading all junior college passers with 2,090 yards and 21 touchdown passes. He transferred to Iowa State University and was named the Cyclones starter going into his first season with the team. He finished the year with 1,391 yards with 11 touchdown passes and 16 interceptions while rushing for 169 yards and four touchdowns. As a senior, he completed 141 of 285 passes for a school record 1,671 yards with 14 touchdowns and 19 interceptions and rushed for an additional seven touchdowns for a Cyclone record 21 total touchdowns as Iowa State went 8–4 and played in the first bowl in program history in the 1971 Sun Bowl. After the season Carlson played in the 1972 Senior Bowl and started in the 1971 North–South Shrine Game.

== Professional career ==
Carlson was selected in the seventh round of the 1972 NFL draft by the Kansas City Chiefs. He spent the 1972 season on the Chiefs practice squad and was on and off the active roster in 1973. He was traded to the Green Bay Packers in exchange for a third round draft pick and was the Packers' third-string quarterback until he was waived on October 22, 1974. He was signed by the Chiefs shortly afterwards and made his only appearance in an NFL game in the final game of the 1974 season, completing 7 of 15 pass attempts for 116 yards with one interception and rushing twice for 17 yards in relief of starter Len Dawson.

== Later life and death ==
Carlson was later a mortgage broker in Kansas City. He died on August 5, 2022, four days after his 72nd birthday.
