= Charles McClendon =

American football player and coach (1923–2001)

Biographical details
- Born: October 17, 1923; Lewisville, Arkansas, U.S.
- Died: December 6, 2001 (aged 78); Baton Rouge, Louisiana, U.S.

Playing career
- 1946–1947: Southern Arkansas
- 1949–1950: Kentucky

Coaching career (HC unless noted)
- 1952: Vanderbilt (assistant)
- 1953–1961: LSU (assistant)
- 1962–1979: LSU

Head coaching record
- Overall: 137–59–7
- Bowls: 7–6

Accomplishments and honors

Championships
- 1 SEC (1970)

Awards
- AFCA Coach of the Year (1970); Amos Alonzo Stagg Award (1992); 2× SEC Coach of the Year (1969, 1970)
- College Football Hall of Fame; Inducted in 1986 (profile)

Charles Youmans McClendon (October 17, 1923 – December 6, 2001), also known as "Cholly Mac", was an American college football player and coach. He served as the head football coach at Louisiana State University (LSU) from 1962 to 1979, compiling a record of 137–59–7. McClendon was inducted into the College Football Hall of Fame as a coach in 1986.

== Early years ==
McClendon was born on October 17, 1923, in Lewisville, Arkansas. He played college football at Southern Arkansas and then under Bear Bryant at the University of Kentucky.

== Coaching career ==
McClendon's first coaching job was as an assistant at Vanderbilt University in 1952. In 1953, he came to LSU as an assistant under head coach Gaynell Tinsley. He was retained as an assistant when Paul Dietzel took over the team in 1955. In 1958, McClendon helped Dietzel coach LSU to its first recognized national championship. At the end of the 1961 season, Dietzel left for Army and picked McClendon to be his successor.

During his first 12 years (1962–1973), McClendon coached the Tigers to nine appearances in the final AP Poll, with an average rank of 9.22. During this time, LSU's record was 97–32–5 (.724 winning percentage) and LSU went to two Sugar Bowls (1965 and 1968), two Cotton Bowl Classics (1963 and 1966), and two Orange Bowls (1971 and 1974). LSU won nine games in five consecutive seasons from 1969 to 1973, but during that stretch won only one Southeastern Conference championship (1970) and one bowl game in four visits, the 1971 Sun Bowl versus Iowa State.

In 1964, LSU defeated arch-rival Ole Miss 10-9 through an unexpected two-point conversion attempt. At first McClendon did not realize his team had made the conversion until he heard the roar of the Tigers' fans.

In 1969, LSU was 9–1 and ranked fifth at the end of the regular season, but when the Cotton Bowl Classic denied the Tigers a match-up with top-ranked and undefeated Texas, LSU refused invitations by the Bluebonnet Bowl and Liberty Bowl, instead opting to stay home. Tiger fans suspected the culprit for the Cotton Bowl Classic snub was the decision by Notre Dame to lift its self-imposed bowl ban and participate in post-season play for the first time since 1925. When the Irish opted to return to the bowl scene, the Cotton Bowl Classic snapped up Notre Dame. The seething antipathy between LSU and Notre Dame boiled over into a two-year series between the schools in 1970 and 1971, in which the home team won each game, Notre Dame in 1970 and LSU in 1971.

Despite all of LSU's success during this period, the Tigers had only a 4–7–1 record against Ole Miss and a 2–14 record against Bear Bryant's Alabama Crimson Tide. 1970 was the only year in which McClendon beat both Ole Miss and Alabama in the same season. Not coincidentally, this was the only year that a McClendon-coached team won an SEC title; his Tigers finished undefeated and untied in SEC play for the first time since 1961, Dietzel's final season. McClendon was awarded AFCA Coach of the Year honors, but the Tigers lost the 1971 Orange Bowl to eventual national champion Nebraska.

McClendon's tenure crested in 1973. The Tigers raced out to a 9–0 record, but lost to Alabama 21-7–a loss that cost that Tigers an SEC title. A week later, they were shut out at Tulane 14-0, their first loss to the Green Wave since 1948. They then lost to Penn State in the Orange Bowl. During McClendon's last six seasons at LSU (1974–1979), LSU had no appearances in the final AP Poll and compiled a record of 38–29–2 (.551 winning percentage). This included McClendon's only two non-winning records at LSU–a 5-5-1 record in 1974 followed by a 5–6 record in 1975. The latter was LSU's first losing season since 1957.

The Tigers rebounded to a 7-3-1 record in 1976. Despite this, former LSU great Billy Cannon began campaigning for McClendon to be fired. Cannon was angered that a number of Louisiana high school stars, most notably Terry Bradshaw, passed on LSU during McClendon's tenure. In response, the LSU Board of Supervisors gave McClendon the option of resigning immediately and being paid for the remaining four years of his contract, or leave at the end of the 1978 season. McClendon opted to stay. Before the 1978 season, Dietzel returned to LSU as athletic director and persuaded the Board of Supervisors to let McClendon stay in 1979. McClendon was due to become president of the American Football Coaches Association, and Dietzel didn't want to embarrass McClendon by firing him that year.

The Tigers lost to Tulane in 1979, but that was followed by a 34–10 victory over Wake Forest in the Tangerine Bowl, McClendon's final game at LSU.

In addition to owning the longest tenure in LSU football coaching history (18 seasons), McClendon holds the program records for most wins (137, including two forfeits to LSU), most losses (59), and most bowl losses (6, tied with Les Miles).

== Later years ==
After his retirement from LSU, McClendon became the executive director of the Tangerine Bowl, now renamed the Citrus Bowl, from 1980 to 1981. He was also the president of the American Football Coaches Association in 1979 and executive director from 1982 to 1994. The Charles McClendon Practice Facility at LSU was named in his honor on September 9, 2002, nine months after his death on December 6, 2001. His death came just two days before LSU won its first outright SEC title in 15 years.

== Head coaching record ==
Year	Team	Overall	Conference	Standing	Bowl/playoffs	Coaches^{#}	AP^{°}
LSU Tigers (Southeastern Conference) (1962–1979)
1962	LSU	9–1–1	5–1	3rd	W Cotton	8	7
1963	LSU	7–4	4–2	5th	L Bluebonnet		
1964	LSU	8–2–1	4–2–1	4th	W Sugar	7	7
1965	LSU	8–3	3–3	T–6th	W Cotton	14	8
1966	LSU	5–4–1	3–3	6th			
1967	LSU	7–3–1	3–2–1	6th	W Sugar		
1968	LSU	8–3	4–2	T–3rd	W Peach		19
1969	LSU	9–1	4–1	2nd		7	10
1970	LSU	9–3	5–0	1st	L Orange	6	7
1971	LSU	9–3	3–2	6th	W Sun	10	11
1972	LSU	9–2–1	4–2–1	4th	L Astro-Bluebonnet	10	11
1973	LSU	9–3	5–1	2nd	L Orange	14	13
1974	LSU	5–5–1	2–4	9th			
1975	LSU	5–6	1–5	T–6th			
1976	LSU	7–3–1	2–4	T–7th			
1977	LSU	8–4	4–2	T–3rd	L Sun		
1978	LSU	8–4	3–3	T–4th	L Liberty		
1979	LSU	7–5	4–2	T–3rd	W Tangerine		
LSU:		137–59–7	63–41–3				
Total:		137–59–7					
National championship Conference title Conference division title or championship game berth
^{#}Rankings from final Coaches Poll.; ^{°}Rankings from final AP Poll.

== See also ==
- List of presidents of the American Football Coaches Association
