= 1971 LSU Tigers football team =

American college football season

1971 LSU Tigers football

Sun Bowl champion

Sun Bowl, W 33–15 vs. Iowa State
- Conference: Southeastern Conference

Ranking
- Coaches: No. 10
- AP: No. 11
- Record: 9–3 (3–2 SEC)
- Head coach: Charles McClendon (10th season)
- Home stadium: Tiger Stadium

1971 Southeastern Conference football standings
	Conf.					Overall
Team	W		L		T	W		L		T
No. 4 Alabama $	7	–	0	–	0	11	–	1	–	0
No. 7 Georgia	5	–	1	–	0	11	–	1	–	0
No. 12 Auburn	5	–	1	–	0	9	–	2	–	0
No. 15 Ole Miss	4	–	2	–	0	10	–	2	–	0
No. 9 Tennessee	4	–	2	–	0	10	–	2	–	0
No. 11 LSU	3	–	2	–	0	9	–	3	–	0
Vanderbilt	1	–	5	–	0	4	–	6	–	1
Florida	1	–	6	–	0	4	–	7	–	0
Kentucky	1	–	6	–	0	3	–	8	–	0
Mississippi State	1	–	7	–	0	2	–	9	–	0
$ – Conference champion; Rankings from AP Poll

The 1971 LSU Tigers football team represented Louisiana State University (LSU) as a member of the Southeastern Conference (SEC) during the 1971 NCAA University Division football season. Led by 10th-year head coach Charles McClendon, the Tigers compiled an overall record of 9–3, with a mark of 3–2 in conference play, and finished sixth in the SEC.

== Schedule ==
Date	Opponent	Rank	Site	TV	Result	Attendance	Source
September 11	Colorado*	No. 9	Tiger Stadium; Baton Rouge, LA		L 21–31	70,099	
September 18	Texas A&M*		Tiger Stadium; Baton Rouge, LA (rivalry)		W 37–0	68,576	
September 25	at Wisconsin*	No. 18	Camp Randall Stadium; Madison, WI		W 38–28	78,535	
October 2	Rice*	No. 16	Tiger Stadium; Baton Rouge, LA		W 38–3	65,976	
October 9	Florida^{†}	No. 16	Tiger Stadium; Baton Rouge, LA (rivalry)		W 48–7	67,055	
October 16	at Kentucky	No. 12	McLean Stadium; Lexington, KY		W 17–13	30,000–35,000	
October 30	at Ole Miss	No. 11	Mississippi Veterans Memorial Stadium; Jackson, MS (rivalry)		L 22–24	47,122	
November 6	at No. 4 Alabama	No. 18	Tiger Stadium; Baton Rouge, LA (rivalry)	ABC	L 7–14	64,892	
November 13	at Mississippi State	No. 20	Mississippi Veterans Memorial Stadium; Jackson, MS (rivalry)		W 28–3	35,000	
November 20	No. 7 Notre Dame*	No. 14	Tiger Stadium; Baton Rouge, LA	ABC	W 28–8	66,936	
November 27	Tulane*	No. 10	Tiger Stadium; Baton Rouge, LA (Battle for the Rag)		W 36–7	59,897	
December 18	vs. Iowa State*	No. 11	Sun Bowl; El Paso, TX (Sun Bowl)	CBS	W 33–15	33,530	
*Non-conference game; ^{†}Homecoming; Rankings from AP Poll released prior to the game

== Roster ==
1971 LSU Tigers football team roster
Players
Coaches
Offense

Pos.	#	Name	Class
HB	24	Art Cantrelle	Sr
SB	3	Al Coffee	Jr
WR	80	Andy Hamilton	Sr
QB	7	Bert Jones	Jr
WR	1	Jimmy LeDoux	Jr
TE, K	81	Jay Michaelson	Sr

Defense

Pos.	#	Name	Class
LB	55	Warren Capone	So
CB	37	Tommy Casanova	Sr
DT	78	Ron Estay	Sr
DT	64	Tyler Lafauci	So
S	17	Frank Racine	So
S	11	John Staggs	So
DE	79	John Wood	Jr

Special teams

Pos.	#	Name	Class

Head coach

- Charles McClendon

Coordinators/assistant coaches

Legend

- (C) Team captain
- (S) Suspended
- (I) Ineligible
- Injured
- Redshirt

Roster

== Team players drafted into the NFL ==
Player	Position	Round	Pick	NFL team
Tommy Casanova	Defensive back	2	29	Cincinnati Bengals
Andy Hamilton	Wide receiver	4	97	Kansas City Chiefs
Ronnie Estay	Defensive tackle	8	186	Denver Broncos
Ken Kavanaugh Jr.	Tight end	15	367	New York Giants
