= 1971 Georgia Bulldogs football team =

American college football season

1971 Georgia Bulldogs football

Gator Bowl champion

Gator Bowl, W 7–3 vs. North Carolina
- Conference: Southeastern Conference

Ranking
- Coaches: No. 8
- AP: No. 7
- Record: 11–1 (5–1 SEC)
- Head coach: Vince Dooley (8th season)
- Defensive coordinator: Erk Russell (8th season)
- Home stadium: Sanford Stadium

1971 Southeastern Conference football standings
	Conf.					Overall
Team	W		L		T	W		L		T
No. 4 Alabama $	7	–	0	–	0	11	–	1	–	0
No. 7 Georgia	5	–	1	–	0	11	–	1	–	0
No. 12 Auburn	5	–	1	–	0	9	–	2	–	0
No. 15 Ole Miss	4	–	2	–	0	10	–	2	–	0
No. 9 Tennessee	4	–	2	–	0	10	–	2	–	0
No. 11 LSU	3	–	2	–	0	9	–	3	–	0
Vanderbilt	1	–	5	–	0	4	–	6	–	1
Florida	1	–	6	–	0	4	–	7	–	0
Kentucky	1	–	6	–	0	3	–	8	–	0
Mississippi State	1	–	7	–	0	2	–	9	–	0
$ – Conference champion; Rankings from AP Poll

The 1971 Georgia Bulldogs football team represented the Georgia Bulldogs of the University of Georgia during the 1971 NCAA University Division football season. This was the first season in which the team gave scholarships to black players; freshmen Richard Appleby, Chuck Kinnebrew, Horace King, Clarence Pope, and Larry West, dubbed "The Five," became the first black players in program history. However, since freshmen were not eligible to play varsity football in 1971 (that restriction was lifted in January 1972), the Bulldogs were one of three SEC schools which still fielded an all-white varsity, along with LSU and Ole Miss. All three fielded their first integrated varsity squads the next season.

== Schedule ==
Date	Opponent	Rank	Site	TV	Result	Attendance	Source
September 11	Oregon State*	No. 18	Sanford Stadium; Athens, GA		W 56–25	50,709	
September 18	Tulane*	No. 11	Sanford Stadium; Athens, GA		W 17–7	51,542	
September 25	at Clemson*	No. 14	Memorial Stadium; Clemson, SC (rivalry)		W 28–0	38,000	
October 2	Mississippi State	No. 11	Sanford Stadium; Athens, GA		W 35–7	53,003	
October 9	at Ole Miss	No. 10	Mississippi Veterans Memorial Stadium; Jackson, MS		W 38–7	42,000	
October 16	at Vanderbilt	No. 8	Dudley Field; Nashville, TN (rivalry)		W 24–0	16,000	
October 23	Kentucky^{†}	No. 8	Sanford Stadium; Athens, GA		W 34–0	57,852	
October 30	at South Carolina*	No. 7	Carolina Stadium; Columbia, SC (rivalry)		W 24–0	54,613	
November 6	vs. Florida	No. 7	Gator Bowl Stadium; Jacksonville, FL (rivalry)	ABC	W 49–7	67,383	
November 13	No. 6 Auburn	No. 7	Sanford Stadium; Athens, GA (rivalry)		L 20–35	62,891	
November 25	at Georgia Tech*	No. 7	Grant Field; Atlanta, GA (rivalry)	ABC	W 28–24	60,124	
December 31	vs. North Carolina*	No. 6	Gator Bowl Stadium; Jacksonville, FL (Gator Bowl)	NBC	W 7–3	71,208	
*Non-conference game; ^{†}Homecoming; Rankings from AP Poll released prior to the game

== Roster ==
1971 Georgia Bulldogs football team roster
Players			Coaches
Offense: Pos. / # / Name / Class; QB / 14 / Andy Johnson / So	Defense: Pos. / # / Name / Class; DT / 70 / Jim Cagle / So	Special teams: Pos. / # / Name / Class	Head coach: Vince Dooley; Coordinators/assistant coaches Legend: (C) Team captain; (S) Suspended; (I) Ineligible; Injured; Redshirt
