= John Reaves =

American football player (1950–2017)

No. 6, 7, 11, 8
- Position: Quarterback

Personal information
- Born: March 2, 1950; Anniston, Alabama, U.S.
- Died: August 1, 2017 (aged 67); Tampa, Florida, U.S.
- Listed height: 6 ft 3 in (1.91 m)
- Listed weight: 210 lb (95 kg)

Career information
- High school: Robinson (Tampa)
- College: Florida
- NFL draft: 1972: 1st round, 14th overall pick

Career history

Playing
- Philadelphia Eagles (1972–1974); Cincinnati Bengals (1975–1978); Minnesota Vikings (1979–1980); Houston Oilers (1981); Tampa Bay Bandits (1983–1985); Tampa Bay Buccaneers (1987)

Coaching
- Florida (AHC/QB) (1990–1994); South Carolina (AHC/QB/PGC) (1995–1997)

Awards and highlights
- Sammy Baugh Trophy (1971); First-team All-American (1971); First-team All-SEC (1969); Second-team All-SEC (1971); Florida–Georgia Hall of Fame; University of Florida Athletic Hall of Fame

Career NFL statistics
- Passing attempts: 616
- Passing completions: 286
- Completion percentage: 46.4%
- TD–INT: 17–34
- Passing yards: 3,617
- Passer rating: 51.4
- Stats at Pro Football Reference

Thomas Johnson "John" Reaves (March 2, 1950 – August 1, 2017) was an American professional football player who was a quarterback for 11 seasons in the National Football League (NFL) and three seasons in the United States Football League (USFL) during the 1970s and 1980s. Reaves played college football for the Florida Gators football, and earned first-team All-American honors.

He was a first-round pick in the 1972 NFL draft, and played professionally for the Philadelphia Eagles, Cincinnati Bengals, Minnesota Vikings, Houston Oilers, and Tampa Bay Buccaneers of the NFL, and the Tampa Bay Bandits of the USFL.

== Early life ==
Reaves was born in Anniston, Alabama, in 1950, and moved to Tampa, Florida, with his mother and grandmother after his father died when he was 9 years old. He attended T.R. Robinson High School in Tampa, where he was a star high-school football quarterback for the Robinson Knights. As a senior in 1967, he led the Knights to the Florida Class 2A football semifinal game before losing to the Coral Gables Cavaliers, who won the state championship and were ranked as the national champions afterward. Reaves was lauded as the State Player of the Year. He also played basketball and baseball and ran track for the Knights, and once scored 52 points in a high-school basketball game.

In 2007, 39 years after he graduated from high school, the Florida High School Athletic Association recognized Reaves as one of the "100 Greatest Players of the First 100 Years" of Florida high school football.

== College career ==
After graduating from high school, Reaves accepted an athletic scholarship to attend the University of Florida in Gainesville, Florida, and played quarterback for coach Ray Graves and coach Doug Dickey's Gators football teams from 1969 to 1971. In his first season as the Gators' starting quarterback, Reaves was part of a group of second-year star players known as the "Super Sophs", which included Reaves, wide receiver Carlos Alvarez, and running back Tommy Durrance. Reaves and the Super Sophs led the Gators to their all-time best season record of 9–1–1, and an upset 14–13 victory over the Tennessee Volunteers in the 1969 Gator Bowl. Reaves and Alvarez subsequently broke every Florida passing and receiving record during their three-year college careers, and Reaves set the National Collegiate Athletic Association (NCAA) career passing record of 7,581 yards and the Southeastern Conference (SEC) career record of 56 touchdowns. Reaves was a first-team All-SEC selection in 1969, a first-team All-American in 1971, and a team captain in 1971. As a senior, he received the Sammy Baugh Trophy, recognizing the nation's best college passer, and the Gators' Fergie Ferguson Award, recognizing the "senior football player who displays outstanding leadership, character, and courage."

His record as the NCAA's all-time career leader in passing yards was achieved after a controversial fourth-quarter play in the last game of the 1971 regular season against Miami. Most members of the Gators' defense lay down on the field in the fourth quarter, allowing the Miami Hurricanes to score a touchdown to allow Florida's offense to get the ball back so Reaves could set the record. The event is referred to as the "Gator Flop," and it is often recalled bitterly by Hurricanes alumni and fans.

Reaves holds the NCAA record for interceptions thrown in a single game, throwing nine against Auburn in 1969.

Reaves returned to Gainesville during the NFL offseason and completed a bachelor's degree in business administration in 1973. He was later inducted into the University of Florida Athletic Hall of Fame as a "Gator Great" in 1985. He was picked as number 30 among the 100 greatest Gators from the first century of the Florida football program by The Gainesville Sun in 2006.

=== Statistics ===
- 1969: 222 completions on 396 attempts, 2,896 yards, 24 touchdowns, 19 interceptions
- 1970: 188 completions on 376 attempts, 2,549 yards, 13 touchdowns, 19 interceptions
- 1971: 193 completions on 356 attempts, 2,104 yards, 17 touchdowns, 21 interceptions

== Professional career ==
Reaves was selected in the first round (14th overall) of the 1972 NFL draft by the Philadelphia Eagles, and he played for the Eagles from 1972 to 1974. He was then traded to the Cincinnati Bengals in 1975, claimed off waivers by the Minnesota Vikings in 1979, and signed to the Houston Oilers in 1981.

Reaves jumped to the expansion Tampa Bay Bandits of the start-up USFL in 1983; he was the Bandits' starting quarterback for three seasons under head coach Steve Spurrier in a pass-oriented offense. He only played eight games of the 1983 season because of a wrist injury. However, he still managed to complete 139 passes out of 259 attempts. He threw for 1,276 yards, but tossed 16 interceptions compared to nine touchdown passes. He bounced back in 1984, going 313 out of 544 for 4,092 yards and tossing 28 touchdowns, compared to 16 interceptions. This was the only USFL season in which he threw more touchdowns than interceptions. In the league's final season, 1985, he was 314 for 561, throwing 29 interceptions compared to 25 touchdown passes.

Reaves was to play for the Orlando Renegades during the USFL's 1986 fall season, but the league dissolved before they could play a game. Reaves next appeared as a replacement player for the Tampa Bay Buccaneers during the 1987 strike. Reaves's NFL career was that of a journeyman back-up—and his NFL career total of 3,417 yards showed it. In Reaves's two seasons as the Bandits' full-time starting quarterback, however, he threw for over 4,000 yards passing both years (1984 and 1985), and just over 10,000 total yards in his three-season USFL career (1983–85).

== Life after the NFL ==
Reaves was an assistant football coach for the Florida Gators under head coach Steve Spurrier from 1990 to 1994, working primarily with the Gators quarterbacks, including Shane Matthews. He left Gainesville to become an assistant coach for the South Carolina Gamecocks under head coach Brad Scott from 1995 to 1997.

Reaves was arrested on gun and drug-possession charges in 2008. Reaves entered an Atlanta-area substance-abuse rehabilitation program in May 2009.

Reaves was found dead on August 1, 2017 at his Tampa home at the age of 67.

== Football family ==
Reaves was the former father-in-law of current LSU Tigers football head coach Lane Kiffin, who was married to Reaves's daughter Layla. Reaves's son David was an assistant coach under Kiffin during Kiffin's one year as the Tennessee Volunteers football head coach. Reaves's younger son Stephen was a back-up quarterback for the Toronto Argonauts of the Canadian Football League (CFL).

== See also ==
- 1971 College Football All-America Team
- Florida Gators football, 1960–69
- Florida Gators football, 1970–79
- List of Florida Gators football All-Americans
- List of Florida Gators in the NFL draft
- List of Philadelphia Eagles first-round draft picks
- List of Philadelphia Eagles players
- List of United States Football League players
- List of University of Florida alumni
- List of University of Florida Athletic Hall of Fame members
