= 1971 Auburn Tigers football team =

American college football season

1971 Auburn Tigers football

Sugar Bowl, L 22–40 vs. Oklahoma
- Conference: Southeastern Conference

Ranking
- Coaches: No. 5
- AP: No. 12
- Record: 9–2 (5–1 SEC)
- Head coach: Ralph Jordan (21st season)
- Captain: Pat Sullivan
- Home stadium: Cliff Hare Stadium

1971 Southeastern Conference football standings
| | Conf. | | | | | Overall |
| Team | W | | L | | T | W | | L | | T |
|---|---|---|---|---|---|---|---|---|---|---|
| No. 4 Alabama $ | 7 | – | 0 | – | 0 | 11 | – | 1 | – | 0 |
| No. 7 Georgia | 5 | – | 1 | – | 0 | 11 | – | 1 | – | 0 |
| No. 12 Auburn | 5 | – | 1 | – | 0 | 9 | – | 2 | – | 0 |
| No. 15 Ole Miss | 4 | – | 2 | – | 0 | 10 | – | 2 | – | 0 |
| No. 9 Tennessee | 4 | – | 2 | – | 0 | 10 | – | 2 | – | 0 |
| No. 11 LSU | 3 | – | 2 | – | 0 | 9 | – | 3 | – | 0 |
| Vanderbilt | 1 | – | 5 | – | 0 | 4 | – | 6 | – | 1 |
| Florida | 1 | – | 6 | – | 0 | 4 | – | 7 | – | 0 |
| Kentucky | 1 | – | 6 | – | 0 | 3 | – | 8 | – | 0 |
| Mississippi State | 1 | – | 7 | – | 0 | 2 | – | 9 | – | 0 |
$ – Conference champion; Rankings from AP Poll

The 1971 Auburn Tigers football team represented Auburn University in the 1971 NCAA University Division football season. The Tigers offense scored 335 points while the defense allowed 182 points. SEC Champion Alabama handed Auburn their only conference loss of the year. Pat Sullivan won the Heisman Trophy.

In the Iron Bowl, both teams entered the regular season finale undefeated: Auburn lost to Alabama, 31–7. On New Year's Day, the Tigers lost to Oklahoma in the Sugar Bowl, 40–22.

== Schedule ==
| Date | Opponent | Rank | Site | Result | Attendance | Source |
|---|---|---|---|---|---|---|
| September 18 | Chattanooga* | No. 7 | Cliff Hare Stadium; Auburn, AL | W 60–7 | 45,000 | |
| September 25 | at No. 9 Tennessee | No. 5 | Neyland Stadium; Knoxville, TN (rivalry) | W 10–9 | 62,990 | |
| October 2 | No. 9 Kentucky | No. 5 | Cliff Hare Stadium; Auburn, AL | W 38–6 | 48,000 | |
| October 9 | Southern Miss* | No. 4 | Cliff Hare Stadium; Auburn, AL | W 27–14 | 42,000 | |
| October 16 | at Georgia Tech* | No. 5 | Grant Field; Atlanta, GA (rivalry) | W 31–14 | 60,204 | |
| October 23 | Clemson*^{†} | No. 5 | Cliff Hare Stadium; Auburn, AL | W 35–13 | 55,000 | |
| October 30 | Florida | No. 5 | Cliff Hare Stadium; Auburn, AL (rivalry) | W 40–7 | 63,500 | |
| November 6 | Mississippi State | No. 5 | Cliff Hare Stadium; Auburn, AL | W 30–21 | 45,000 | |
| November 13 | at No. 7 Georgia | No. 6 | Sanford Stadium; Athens, GA (rivalry) | W 35–20 | 62,891 | |
| November 27 | vs. No. 3 Alabama | No. 5 | Legion Field; Birmingham, AL (Iron Bowl) | L 7–31 | 68,821 | |
| January 1 | vs. No. 3 Oklahoma* | No. 5 | Tulane Stadium; New Orleans, LA (Sugar Bowl) | L 22–40 | 84,031 | |
*Non-conference game; ^{†}Homecoming; Rankings from AP Poll released prior to the game

== Roster ==
1971 Auburn Tigers football team roster
Players
Coaches
Offense

| Pos. | # | Name | Class |
|---|---|---|---|
| QB | 7 | Pat Sullivan | Sr |
| WR | 88 | Terry Beasley | Sr |

Defense

| Pos. | # | Name | Class |

Special teams

| Pos. | # | Name | Class |

Head coach

- Ralph Jordan

Coordinators/assistant coaches

Legend

- (C) Team captain
- (S) Suspended
- (I) Ineligible
- Injured
- Redshirt

Roster

== 1972 NFL draft ==
| Player | Position | Round | Pick | NFL club |
|---|---|---|---|---|
| Terry Beasley | Wide receiver | 1 | 19 | San Francisco 49ers |
| Pat Sullivan | Quarterback | 2 | 40 | Atlanta Falcons |
| Dick Schmalz | Wide receiver | 17 | 440 | Minnesota Vikings |

== Awards and honors ==
- Pat Sullivan, Heisman Trophy
- Pat Sullivan, Walter Camp Award
