= 1971 Ole Miss Rebels football team =

American college football season

1971 Ole Miss Rebels football

Peach Bowl champion

Peach Bowl, W 41–18 vs. Georgia Tech
- Conference: Southeastern Conference

Ranking
- Coaches: No. 20
- AP: No. 15
- Record: 10–2 (4–2 SEC)
- Head coach: Billy Kinard (1st season)
- Captains: Paul Dongieux; Riley Myers
- Home stadium: Hemingway Stadium

1971 Southeastern Conference football standings
	Conf.					Overall
Team	W		L		T	W		L		T
No. 4 Alabama $	7	–	0	–	0	11	–	1	–	0
No. 7 Georgia	5	–	1	–	0	11	–	1	–	0
No. 12 Auburn	5	–	1	–	0	9	–	2	–	0
No. 15 Ole Miss	4	–	2	–	0	10	–	2	–	0
No. 9 Tennessee	4	–	2	–	0	10	–	2	–	0
No. 11 LSU	3	–	2	–	0	9	–	3	–	0
Vanderbilt	1	–	5	–	0	4	–	6	–	1
Florida	1	–	6	–	0	4	–	7	–	0
Kentucky	1	–	6	–	0	3	–	8	–	0
Mississippi State	1	–	7	–	0	2	–	9	–	0
$ – Conference champion; Rankings from AP Poll

The 1971 Ole Miss Rebels football team represented the University of Mississippi during the 1971 NCAA University Division football season. It was the first Rebel squad since 1946 to not be coached by Johnny Vaught, who was forced to take a leave of absence midway through the previous campaign due to health concerns. This was also Ole Miss' last all-white varsity team. The Rebels and Southeastern Conference rival LSU were the last major college teams still fielding all-white squads. LSU also fielded its first desegregated varsity squad in 1972.

== Schedule ==
Date	Time	Opponent	Rank	Site	Result	Attendance	Source
September 11		Long Beach State*		Mississippi Veterans Memorial Stadium; Jackson, MS	W 29–13	33,500	
September 18	7:30 p.m.	at Memphis State*		Memphis Memorial Stadium; Memphis, TN (rivalry)	W 49–21	50,164	
September 25		at Kentucky		McLean Stadium; Lexington, KY	W 34–20	37,500	
October 2		at No. 7 Alabama		Legion Field; Birmingham, AL (rivalry)	L 6–40	72,871	
October 9		No. 10 Georgia		Mississippi Veterans Memorial Stadium; Jackson, MS	L 7–38	42,000	
October 16		Southern Miss*		Hemingway Stadium; Oxford, MS	W 20–6	23,200	
October 23		Vanderbilt^{†}		Hemingway Stadium; Oxford, MS (rivalry)	W 28–7	27,500	
October 30		No. 11 LSU		Mississippi Veterans Memorial Stadium; Jackson, MS (rivalry)	W 24–22	47,122	
November 6		at Tampa*		Tampa Stadium; Tampa, FL	W 28–27	20,559–20,959	
November 13		Chattanooga*		Hemingway Stadium; Oxford, MS	W 49–10	22,190	
November 25		at Mississippi State	No. 18	Scott Field; Starkville, MS (Egg Bowl)	W 48–0	35,000	
December 30		vs. Georgia Tech*	No. 17	Atlanta Stadium; Atlanta, GA (Peach Bowl)	W 41–18	36,771	
*Non-conference game; ^{†}Homecoming; Rankings from AP Poll released prior to the game; All times are in Central time

== Game summaries ==
=== Mississippi State ===
Team	1	2	3	4	Total
• Ole Miss	0	42	3	3	48
Mississippi St	0	0	0	0	0

- Date: November 25
- Location: Scott Field
- Game attendance: 35,000

Scoring summary
Q2	MISS	Ainsworth 2 yard run (Hinton kick)	MISS 7–0
Q2	MISS	Ainsworth 19 yard run (Hinton kick)	MISS 14–0
Q2	MISS	Veazey ?? yard pass from Weese (run failed)	MISS 20–0
Q2	MISS	Ainsworth 20 yard run (Allen pass from Weese)	MISS 28–0
Q2	MISS	Myers 35 yard pass from Weese (Hinton kick)	MISS 35–0
Q2	MISS	Moley 43 yard interception return (Hinton kick)	MISS 42–0
Q3	MISS	Hinton 27 yard field goal	MISS 45–0
Q4	MISS	Hinton 37 yard field goal	MISS 48–0

== Roster ==
1971 Ole Miss Rebels football team roster
Players
Coaches
Offense

Pos.	#	Name	Class
TE		Jim Poole Jr.	Sr
QB	16	Norris Weese	So

Defense

Pos.	#	Name	Class

Special teams

Pos.	#	Name	Class

Head coach

- Billy Kinard

Coordinators/assistant coaches

Legend

- (C) Team captain
- (S) Suspended
- (I) Ineligible
- Injured
- Redshirt

== Awards ==
- All-SEC: DT Elmer Allen (AP, 1st Team), DB Paul Dongieux (AP, 2nd Team), TE Jim Poole Jr. (UPI, 1st Team)
