= 1972 Sugar Bowl (January) =

American college football game

- 38th Sugar Bowl
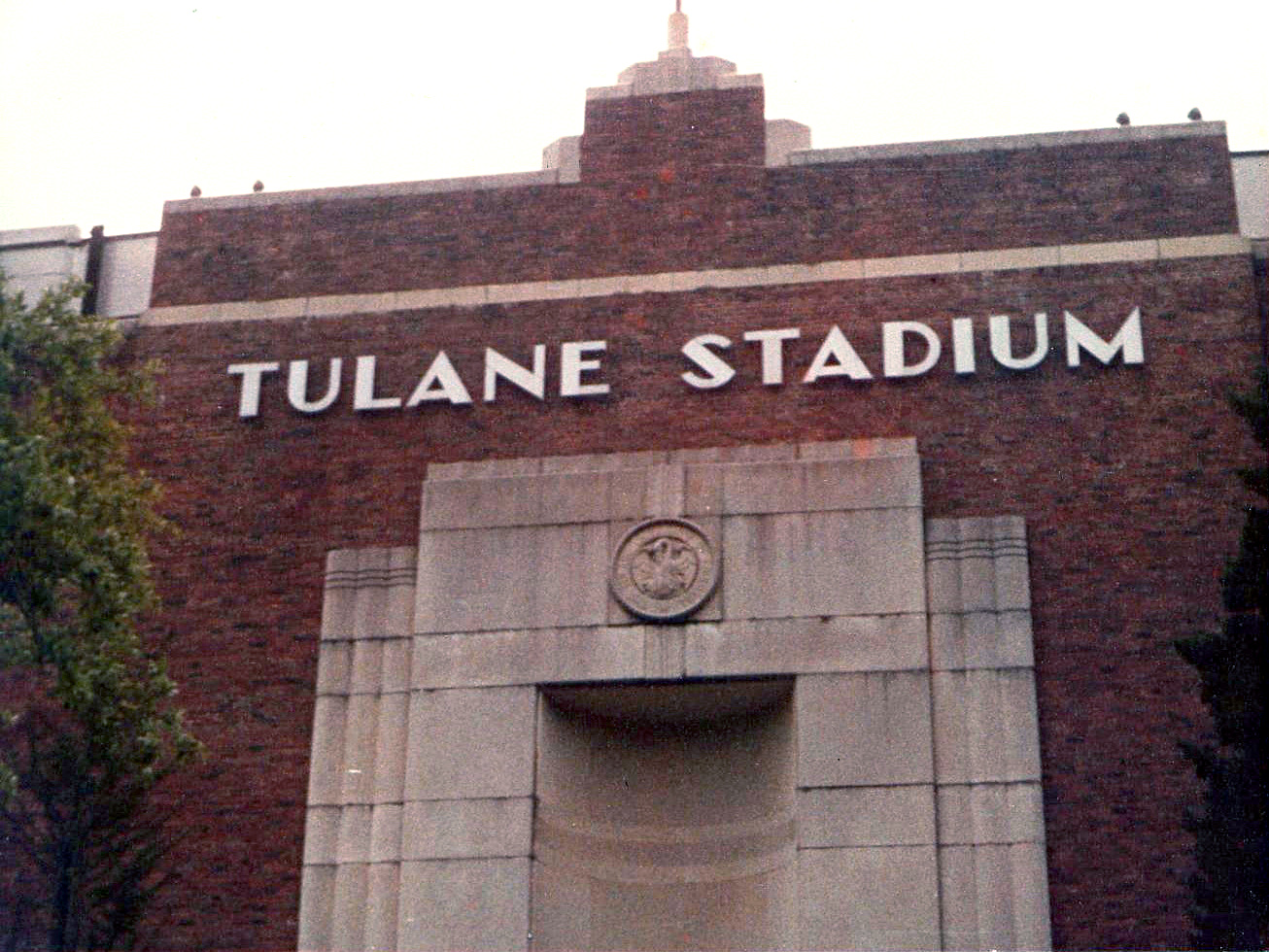
- Tulane Stadium in New Orleans, Louisiana, hosted the Sugar Bowl.
Oklahoma Sooners	Auburn Tigers
(10–1)	(9–1)
Big Eight	SEC
40	22
Head coach: Chuck Fairbanks	Head coach: Ralph Jordan
AP / Coaches; 3 / 3	AP / Coaches; 5 / 5
	1	2	3	4	Total
Oklahoma	19	12	3	6	40
Auburn	0	0	7	15	22
- Date: January 1, 1972
- Season: 1971
- Stadium: Tulane Stadium
- Location: New Orleans, Louisiana
- MVP: Jack Mildren (Oklahoma QB)
- Favorite: Oklahoma by 10 points
- National anthem: Ella Fitzgerald
- Referee: James M. Artley (SEC) (split crew: SEC, Big 8)
- Attendance: 84,031

United States TV coverage
- Network: ABC
- Announcers: Chris Schenkel and Bud Wilkinson

The 1972 Sugar Bowl (January) was the 38th edition of the college football bowl game, played at Tulane Stadium in New Orleans, on Saturday, January 1. It featured the third-ranked Oklahoma Sooners of the Big Eight Conference and the #5 Auburn Tigers of the Southeastern Conference (SEC). The favored Sooners won 40–22.

This was the last Sugar Bowl played in January until 1977, as it moved to New Year's Eve night for the next four editions.

== Teams ==
Although the runner-up in their respective conferences, both teams were ranked in the top five in the polls, as this game was a tale of duality. Both teams averaged over 300 yards on the season, though Oklahoma's record setting 566 yards a game was more notable than Auburn's 393. Both teams started the season 9–0, with both teams losing late in the season to their respective arch-rivals, who were likewise undefeated and untied.

=== Oklahoma ===
On Thanksgiving day, Oklahoma lost a late lead to visiting #1 Nebraska in a memorable game, and fell from second to third in the rankings. This was the Sooners' fourth appearance in the Sugar Bowl, but first since 1951.

=== Auburn ===
Auburn lost 31–7 to Alabama in late November; they remained at fifth in the rankings and were invited to their first Sugar Bowl. Alabama and Nebraska matched up in the Orange Bowl for the national championship, essentially making this a runner-up game.

== Game summary ==
Televised by ABC, the kickoff was in the morning at 11 a.m. CST, two hours before the Cotton Bowl on CBS. Despite all tickets being sold, the Sugar Bowl refused to lift the blackout in New Orleans, Baton Rouge and Lafayette.

Though he threw only four passes (with one completion), Oklahoma quarterback Jack Mildren used his legs to help win the game and the MVP award, running thirty times for 149 yards and three touchdowns. Leon Crosswhite helped start the scoring with a touchdown run on OU's first drive. Mildren scored three straight touchdown runs to make it 25–0 by the second quarter and after a punt return touchdown by Joe Wylie, it was 31–0 at halftime.

Sooner kicker John Carroll made a 53-yard field goal before Auburn finally got on the scoreboard with a touchdown run by fullback Harry Unger, and the score was 34–7 after three quarters. The Sooners responded as halfback Greg Pruitt made it an even forty points, and Auburn then scored two late touchdowns. The first was a pass from Heisman Trophy winner Pat Sullivan to Sandy Cannon with less than four minutes remaining, and Unger added another on the ground to complete the scoring at 40–22. Oklahoma had more yards, fewer turnovers (2 to 3), and more first downs, and won their first Sugar Bowl since 1950.

== Scoring ==
First quarter

- Oklahoma – Leon Crosswhite 4-yard run (kick failed)
- Oklahoma – Jack Mildren 5-yard run (John Carroll kick)
- Oklahoma – Joe Wylie 71-yard punt return (pass failed)

Second quarter

- Oklahoma – Mildren 4-yard run (run failed)
- Oklahoma – Mildren 7-yard run (pass failed)

Third quarter

- Oklahoma – Carroll 53-yard field goal
- Auburn – Harry Unger 2-yard run (Gardner Jett kick)

Fourth quarter

- Oklahoma – Greg Pruitt 2-yard run (kick failed)
- Auburn – Sandy Cannon 12-yard pass from Pat Sullivan (Jett kick)
- Auburn – Unger 1-yard run (David Beck run)

== Statistics ==
Statistics	Oklahoma	Auburn
First Downs	28	15
Rushes–Yards	87–439	19–40
Yards Passing	11	250
Passes	1–4–0	20–45–2
Total yards	91–450	64–290
Punts-Average	5–35.4	5–48.6
Fumbles–Lost	5–2	5–1
Turnovers	2	3
Penalties–Yards	3–12	0–0

== Aftermath ==
Oklahoma moved up to second in the final AP poll, followed by Colorado, the only time the top three teams were from the same conference. Alabama fell to fourth and Auburn dropped to twelfth.

The Sooners returned to the Sugar Bowl in December and defeated Penn State, becoming the only school to win the same bowl game twice in a calendar year. Auburn waited twelve years for their next Sugar Bowl, a victory over Michigan.

Ella Fitzgerald, who performed "The Star-Spangled Banner" prior to the Sugar Bowl, was part of the Super Bowl VI halftime show at Tulane Stadium fifteen days later.
