= George Hunt (American football) =

American football player (born 1949)

No. 10, 9
- Position: Placekicker

Personal information
- Born: August 3, 1949 (age 77); Clearwater, Florida, U.S.
- Listed height: 6 ft 1 in (1.85 m)
- Listed weight: 215 lb (98 kg)

Career information
- High school: Clearwater
- College: Tennessee
- NFL draft: 1972: 5th round, 122nd overall pick

Career history
- Cleveland Browns (1972); Baltimore Colts (1973); New York Giants (1975)

Awards and highlights
- First-team All-SEC (1971)

Career NFL statistics
- Field goals: 22
- Field goal attempts: 39
- Field goal %: 56.4
- Longest field goal: 41
- Stats at Pro Football Reference

George Arthur Hunt (born August 3, 1949) is an American former professional football player who was a placekicker in the National Football League (NFL) for the Baltimore Colts and New York Giants. He played college football for the Tennessee Volunteers. He was selected by the Cleveland Browns in the fifth round of the 1972 NFL draft with the 122nd overall pick.
