= 1971 Alabama Crimson Tide football team =

American college football season

1971 Alabama Crimson Tide football

SEC champion

Orange Bowl, L 6–38 vs. Nebraska
- Conference: Southeastern Conference

Ranking
- Coaches: No. 2
- AP: No. 4
- Record: 11–1 (7–0 SEC)
- Head coach: Bear Bryant (14th season)
- Offensive scheme: Wishbone
- Base defense: 5–2
- Captains: Johnny Musso; Robin Parkhouse
- Home stadium: Denny Stadium; Legion Field

1971 Southeastern Conference football standings
	Conf.					Overall
Team	W		L		T	W		L		T
No. 4 Alabama $	7	–	0	–	0	11	–	1	–	0
No. 7 Georgia	5	–	1	–	0	11	–	1	–	0
No. 12 Auburn	5	–	1	–	0	9	–	2	–	0
No. 15 Ole Miss	4	–	2	–	0	10	–	2	–	0
No. 9 Tennessee	4	–	2	–	0	10	–	2	–	0
No. 11 LSU	3	–	2	–	0	9	–	3	–	0
Vanderbilt	1	–	5	–	0	4	–	6	–	1
Florida	1	–	6	–	0	4	–	7	–	0
Kentucky	1	–	6	–	0	3	–	8	–	0
Mississippi State	1	–	7	–	0	2	–	9	–	0
$ – Conference champion; Rankings from AP Poll

The 1971 Alabama Crimson Tide football team (variously "Alabama", "UA" or "Bama") represented the University of Alabama in the 1971 NCAA University Division football season. It was the Crimson Tide's 77th overall and 38th season as a member of the Southeastern Conference (SEC). The team was led by head coach Bear Bryant, in his 14th year, and played their home games at Denny Stadium in Tuscaloosa and Legion Field in Birmingham, Alabama. They finished season with eleven wins and one loss (11–1 overall, 7–0 in the SEC), as SEC champions and with a loss to Nebraska in the Orange Bowl.

The 1971 squad was notable for a pair of firsts in Alabama football history. This was the first team that African Americans contributed as members of the Alabama varsity squad, with John Mitchell being the first to actually see playing time. 1971 also marked the first season the Crimson Tide utilized the wishbone offense that Alabama became noted for throughout the remainder of Bryant's tenure as head coach at Alabama.

Alabama opened the season with an upset victory at USC. This was the first game that the wishbone was utilized by the Crimson Tide offense, and their victory was attributed in part to surprising the Trojans with its introduction. They then won their next four games over Southern Miss, Florida, Ole Miss and Vanderbilt and set up a top 20 match-up against Tennessee. In their rival game, the Crimson Tide ended a four-game losing streak to the Vols with their 32–15 victory. After a hard-fought win over Houston and victory over Mississippi State at Jackson, Alabama defeated LSU for their third win over a ranked team on the season.

The Crimson Tide next defeated Miami on homecoming and set up a match-up between undefeated teams for the first time in the history of the Iron Bowl to close the regular season. With both teams ranked in the top five, Alabama defeated Auburn 31–7 and captured the outright SEC football championship. However, they were unable to capture a national championship as they were defeated by No. 1 Nebraska 38–6 to close the season in the Orange Bowl.

== Schedule ==
Date	Opponent	Rank	Site	TV	Result	Attendance
September 10	at No. 5 USC*	No. 16	Los Angeles Memorial Coliseum; Los Angeles, CA		W 17–10	67,781
September 18	Southern Miss*	No. 9	Denny Stadium; Tuscaloosa, AL		W 42–6	52,701
September 25	at Florida	No. 8	Florida Field; Gainesville, FL (rivalry)		W 38–0	61,832
October 2	Ole Miss	No. 7	Legion Field; Birmingham, AL (rivalry)		W 40–6	72,871
October 9	at Vanderbilt	No. 6	Dudley Field; Nashville, TN		W 42–0	34,000
October 16	No. 14 Tennessee	No. 4	Legion Field; Birmingham, AL (Third Saturday in October)		W 32–15	73,828
October 23	Houston*	No. 4	Denny Stadium; Tuscaloosa, AL		W 34–20	56,939
October 30	at Mississippi State	No. 4	Mississippi Veterans Memorial Stadium; Jackson, MS (rivalry)		W 41–10	40,500
November 6	at No. 18 LSU	No. 4	Tiger Stadium; Baton Rouge, LA (rivalry)	ABC	W 14–7	64,892
November 13	Miami (FL)*^{†}	No. 4	Denny Stadium; Tuscaloosa, AL		W 31–3	57,313
November 27	vs. No. 5 Auburn	No. 3	Legion Field; Birmingham, AL (Iron Bowl)	ABC	W 31–7	68,861
January 1, 1972	vs. No. 1 Nebraska*	No. 2	Miami Orange Bowl; Miami, FL (Orange Bowl)	NBC	L 6–38	78,151
*Non-conference game; ^{†}Homecoming; Rankings from AP Poll released prior to the game

== Integration ==
Although several African American students competed during spring practice in 1967, Wilbur Jackson became the first African American awarded a scholarship to play for Alabama, and he competed as a member of the freshman squad in 1970 and played for the varsity team in 1971. For the 1971 season, John Mitchell became the first African American to play on the varsity squad for the Crimson Tide during the regular season after he transferred from Eastern Arizona College.

While the Crimson Tide finally fielded Black Players, they lost the National Championship to a well Integrated Nebraska team. Nebraska's best players who made the difference in the blowout victory were African Americans including Outland Trophy Winner Rich Glover, future Heisman Trophy winner Johnny Rodgers and bowl game MVP Willie Harper amongst others. Nebraska's victory played a part in causing the SEC as a whole to integrate their teams and that integration would help Alabama reinvigorate their team creating a new dynasty winning National Championships in the years to come.

== Wishbone offense ==
In 1968, Texas head coach Darrell Royal and his offensive coordinator Emory Bellard introduced what would become known as the wishbone offense. The wishbone was derived from the Split-T offense run at Oklahoma under Bud Wilkinson. In the formation, the quarterback lines up with a fullback and two tailbacks behind him, and on any play may keep the ball, hand off to the fullback, or pitch to a tailback. From the time Bryant arrived at Alabama through the 1970 season, the Crimson Tide ran a pro-style offense. By 1969, Bryant began to recruit larger linemen and tailbacks, and after a pair of six win seasons in 1969 and 1970, Bryant saw the success of the wishbone for the Longhorns and decided to implement the offense for the 1971 season. In spring 1971, Alabama assistants Mal Moore and Jimmy Sharpe traveled to Austin where they saw first hand how the wishbone operated during Texas' final week of spring practice.

During the second summer session at the University, both Moore and Sharpe began to work with players on the offensive change, and in August Royal and Bellard traveled to Tuscaloosa and led a coaching clinic for the Alabama staff on the wishbone. In order to keep the change a secret, Bryant closed all of the Crimson Tide's practices closed from the public, screened the practice field from view with a canvas and hired security to keep people away. The change to the wishbone was kept under such secrecy that when the media would visit practice, Bryant had the team practice the pro-style system that was phased out. Alabama later opened the season with an upset victory over USC that was credited to the surprise switch to the wishbone that caught the Trojans off-guard.

== Game summaries ==
=== USC ===
Team	1	2	3	4	Total
• #16 Alabama	10	7	0	0	17
#5 USC	0	10	0	0	10

- Date: September 10
- Location: Memorial Coliseum
  Los Angeles, CA
- Game attendance: 67,781

After the NCAA enacted a rule that allowed its member institutions to schedule an eleventh regular season game, in January 1970 the Crimson Tide agreed to a home-and-home series with the University of Southern California (USC). At the Los Angeles Memorial Coliseum, Alabama upset the No. 5 Trojans 17–10 on a Friday night to open the 1971 season. The Crimson Tide took a 10–0 lead in the first quarter behind a 13-yard Johnny Musso touchdown run and a 37-yard Bill Davis field goal. They extended it further to 17–0 early in the second quarter on an eight-yard Musso touchdown run.

USC responds with ten unanswered points and made the halftime score 17–10. They scored first on a seven-yard Charles Young touchdown run and next on a 37-yard Mike Rae field goal. Neither team scored in the second half as both defenses created several turnovers and Alabama won 17–10. The victory was also the 200th career win for Alabama head coach Bear Bryant.

=== Southern Miss ===
Team	1	2	3	4	Total
Southern Miss	0	0	0	6	6
• #9 Alabama	7	14	14	7	42

- Date: September 18
- Location: Denny Stadium
  Tuscaloosa, AL
- Game attendance: 52,701

After their victory over USC, Alabama moved into the No. 9 position in the AP Poll prior to their game against Southern Miss. In their home opener, Alabama played 62 different players and defeated the Southerners 42–6 at Denny Stadium. Johnny Musso gave the Crimson Tide a 14–0 lead with touchdown runs of one-yard in the first and 16-yards in the second quarter. Ellis Beck then extended their lead to 21–0 with his one-yard touchdown run prior to halftime.

The Crimson Tide extended their lead further to 35–0 with third quarter touchdowns scored on a four-yard Joe LaBue run and a 25-yard Benny Rippetoe pass to William Wood. Southern Miss ended the shutout attempt with a nine-yard Doyle Orange touchdown run in the fourth, and Alabama closed with an 18-yard Steve Bisceglia touchdown run that made the final score 42–6.

=== Florida ===
Team	1	2	3	4	Total
• #8 Alabama	10	14	7	7	38
Florida	0	0	0	0	0

- Date: September 25
- Location: Florida Field
  Gainesville, FL
- Game attendance: 61,832

After their victory over Southern Miss, Alabama moved into the No. 8 position in the AP Poll prior to their game against Florida. Against the Gators, Johnny Musso scored four rushing touchdowns en route to a 38–0 shutout at Florida Field. After Bill Davis gave the Crimson Tide a 3–0 lead with his first quarter field goal, Musso scored Alabama's next four touchdowns and extended their lead to 31–0. All four came on the ground with a pair from one-yard out, a three-yard run and a five-yard run. Alabama then closed the game with an 11-yard Billy Sexton touchdown pass to Dexter Wood that made the final score 38–0.

The four touchdowns scored by Musso on the ground set a new school record for rushing touchdowns. Additionally, the shutout was the first for the Crimson Tide defense since their 17–0 victory in 1967 over South Carolina.

=== Ole Miss ===
Team	1	2	3	4	Total
Ole Miss	0	6	0	0	6
• #7 Alabama	3	10	14	13	40

- Date: October 2
- Location: Legion Field
  Birmingham, AL
- Game attendance: 72,871

After their victory over Florida, Alabama moved into the No. 7 position in the AP Poll prior to their game against Ole Miss. Looking to avenge the 48–23 loss from the previous season, the Crimson Tide defeated the Rebels 40–6 at Legion Field. After Bill Davis gave the Crimson Tide a 6–0 with field goals of 25 and 42-yards, Ole Miss tied the game 6–6 with what was their only points of the game. The score came on a 48-yard Kenneth Lyons touchdown pass to Elmer Allen in the second quarter. Alabama responded with an 11-yard Terry Davis touchdown pass to David Bailey that made the halftime score 13–6.

Alabama extended their lead to 27–6 in the third quarter behind touchdown runs of 29-yards by Joe LaBue and seven-yards by Johnny Musso. The Crimson Tide then closed the game with touchdown runs of 15-yards by Steve Bisceglia and 14-yards by Butch Hobson that made the final score 40–6. The 531 rushing yards made by Alabama were the most allowed by the Rebels' defense in school history.

=== Vanderbilt ===
Team	1	2	3	4	Total
• #6 Alabama	7	6	15	14	42
Vanderbilt	0	0	0	0	0

- Date: October 9
- Location: Dudley Field
  Nashville, TN
- Game attendance: 34,000

After their victory over Ole Miss, Alabama moved into the No. 6 position in the AP Poll prior to their game against Vanderbilt. Against the Commodores, the Alabama defense forced their second shutout of the season win this 42–0 victory at Dudley Field. Johnny Musso gave the Crimson Tide a 7–0 lead with his 17-yard touchdown run in the first quarter. Their lead was then stretched to 13–0 at halftime behind field goals of 33-yards by Bill Davis and 26-yards by Greg Gantt.

Alabama closed the game with a pair of touchdowns in each of the final two quarters and won 42–0. Ellis Beck scored on a one-yard run and Terry Davis threw a nine-yard touchdown pass to Jim Simmons in the third quarter. In the fourth, Bob McKinney scored on a 55-yard punt return and Johnny Sharpless scored on an 11-yard touchdown run.

=== Tennessee ===
Third Saturday in October

Team	1	2	3	4	Total
#14 Tennessee	7	0	0	8	15
• #4 Alabama	6	9	7	10	32

- Date: October 16
- Location: Legion Field
  Birmingham, AL
- Game attendance: 73,828

After their victory at Vanderbilt, Alabama moved into the No. 4 position and Tennessee into the No. 14 position in the AP Poll prior to their game at Legion Field. Against the Volunteers, Alabama ended a four-game losing streak that dated back to their 1967 season with this 32–15 in their annual rivalry game. After the Crimson Tide took an early 6–0 lead on a 20-yard Terry Davis touchdown pass to David Bailey, the Vols responded with a four-yard Curt Watson touchdown run that made the score 7–6 at the end of the first quarter. Alabama then took a 15–6 halftime lead after a 27-yard Bill Davis field goal and six-yard Terry Davis touchdown run in the second quarter.

Early in the third, the Crimson Tide extended their lead to 22–7 behind a 16-yard Terry Davis touchdown pass to Bailey. Tennessee responded in the fourth with a nine-yard Watson touchdown run that cut the Alabama lead to 22–15. However, the Crimson Tide closed the game with a 39-yard Bill Davis field goal and five-yard Johnny Musso touchdown run for the 32–15 victory. The 73,828 in attendance set a new record for largest crowd in the history of Legion Field to date.

=== Houston ===
Team	1	2	3	4	Total
Houston	0	7	7	6	20
• #4 Alabama	7	13	6	8	34

- Date: October 23
- Location: Denny Stadium
  Tuscaloosa, AL
- Game attendance: 56,939

With their over the Vols, Alabama retained their No. 4 position in the AP Poll prior to their game against Houston. Although the Cougars outgained the Crimson Tide by over 100 total yards, Alabama won 34–20 at Denny Stadium. Alabama took a 7–0 first quarter lead on a two-yard Johnny Musso touchdown run, but Houston then scored on a three-yard Tom Mozisek touchdown run that tied the game 7–7 early in the second. The Crimson Tide responded with a pair of Terry Davis touchdown passes to David Bailey from 10 and 25-yards that gave Alabama a 20–7 halftime lead.

Both teams then traded touchdowns in the second half en route to the 34–20 Crimson Tide victory. In the third quarter, Musso scored for Alabama first with his nine-yard run and Houston followed with a three-yard Gary Mullins touchdown pass to Riley Odoms; in the fourth Joe LaBue scored for the Crimson tide on a 10-yard run and Mullins threw a second, three-yard pass to Odoms that made the final score 34–20. In the game, Musso had 132 yards rushing for Alabama and both Robert Newhouse and Tom Mozisek each had over 100 yards rushing for Houston with 182 and 105 respectively.

=== Mississippi State ===
Team	1	2	3	4	Total
• #4 Alabama	3	14	0	24	41
Mississippi State	0	3	7	0	10

- Date: October 30
- Location: Memorial Stadium
  Jackson, MS
- Game attendance: 40,500

As they entered their game against Mississippi State, Alabama retained their No. 4 position in the AP Poll. At Mississippi Veterans Memorial Stadium, the visiting Crimson Tide did not allow an offensive touchdown and defeated the Bulldogs 41–10. After Alabama took a 3–0 first quarter lead behind a 20-yard Bill Davis field goal, they scored a pair of touchdowns in the second. The first came on a 31-yard Terry Davis pass to Wayne Wheeler and the second on a 30-yard Steve Higginbotham interception return. The Bulldogs then made the halftime score 17–3 behind a 41-yard Glenn Ellis field goal at the end of the second.

State cut the Alabama lead to 17–10 on an 88-yard Frank Dowsing punt return in the third. However, the Crimson Tide closed the game with 24 unanswered points for the 41–10 win. Fourth quarter points were scored on a 33-yard Bill Davis field goal, touchdowns on runs of one-yard by Johnny Musso and 16-yards by David Knapp and on a one-yard Terry Davis pass to Glenn Woodruff.

The win was Bryant's 116th win at Alabama and broke Frank Thomas' record of 115 wins as the head coach of the Crimson Tide.

=== LSU ===
Team	1	2	3	4	Total
• #4 Alabama	3	3	8	0	14
#18 LSU	0	0	7	0	7

- Date: November 6
- Location: Tiger Stadium
  Baton Rouge, LA
- Game attendance: 64,892

After their victory over Mississippi State, Alabama retained their No. 4 position and LSU was in the No. 18 position in the AP Poll prior to their match-up at Baton Rouge. Playing in a regionally televised game on ABC, Alabama defeated the Tigers 14–7 at Tiger Stadium. Bill Davis scored all of the first half points with his field goals of 29 and 38-yards that gave Alabama a 6–0 halftime lead. Scoring concluded in the third quarter behind a 16-yard Terry Davis touchdown run for the Crimson Tide and a seven-yard Paul Lyons touchdown pass to Andy Hamilton that made the final score 14–7.

=== Miami (FL) ===
Team	1	2	3	4	Total
Miami	3	0	0	0	3
• #4 Alabama	13	3	8	7	31

- Date: November 13
- Location: Denny Stadium
  Tuscaloosa, AL
- Game attendance: 57,313

As they entered their game against Miami, Alabama retained their No. 4 position in the AP Poll for a fifth consecutive week. On homecoming in Tuscaloosa, Alabama defeated Hurricanes 31–3 at Denny Stadium. Mike Burke scored the only Miami points with his 42-yard field goal in the first and gave the Hurricanes their only lead at 3–0. The Crimson Tide responded with a pair of touchdowns later in the first on runs of 22-yards by Terry Davis and 67-yards by Wilbur Jackson. A 27-yard Bill Davis field goal in the second gave Alabama a 16–3 halftime lead.

The Crimson Tide closed the game with a six-yard Terry Davis touchdown run in the third and a 10-yard Butch Hobson touchdown run in the fourth for the 31–3 Alabama win. With their 345 offensive yards in the game, Alabama surpassed the previous SEC season record for total offense of 3,068 yards set by Tennessee in 1951.

=== Auburn ===
Iron Bowl

Team	1	2	3	4	Total
#5 Auburn	0	7	0	0	7
• #3 Alabama	14	0	0	17	31

- Date: November 27
- Location: Legion Field
  Birmingham, AL
- Game attendance: 68,861

As they entered their annual rivalry game against Auburn, Alabama moved into the No. 3 position and the Tigers were in the No. 5 position in the AP Poll prior to the first top five match-up in the Iron Bowl. In what was the first Alabama–Auburn game that featured two undefeated teams, the Crimson Tide defeated their rival 31–7 and captured the outright SEC championship for the 1971 season. Alabama took a 14–0 lead behind first quarter touchdown runs of six and 11-yards by Terry Davis. Auburn responded with a 31-yard Harry Unger touchdown pass to Terry Beasley in the second quarter that made the halftime score 14–7.

After a scoreless third, the Crimson Tide scored 17 unanswered points in the fourth quarter and won 31–7. After Bill Davis connected on a 41-yard field goal, Johnny Musso scored on touchdown runs of 12 and six-yards in the victory.

=== Nebraska ===
Orange Bowl

Team	1	2	3	4	Total
#2 Alabama	0	0	6	0	6
• #1 Nebraska	14	14	3	7	38

- Date: January 1
- Location: Orange Bowl
  Miami, FL
- Game attendance: 78,151

In what was a No. 1 versus No. 2 matchup for the national championship, Alabama was dominated by the Nebraska Cornhuskers 38–6 in the Orange Bowl. Nebraska stormed out to a 28–0 halftime lead after they scored a pair of touchdowns in the first two quarters. Jeff Kinney scored on a two-yard run and Johnny Rodgers on a 77-yard punt return in the first; Jerry Tagge scored on a one-yard run and Gary Dixon on a two-yard run in the second quarter.

Alabama then scored their only points on a three-yard Terry Davis touchdown run in the third and made the score 28–6. However, the Cornhuskers closed the game with a 21-yard Rich Sanger field goal in the third and a one-yard Van Brownson touchdown run in the fourth that made the final score 38–6.

== NFL draft ==
Several players that were varsity lettermen from the 1971 squad were drafted into the National Football League (NFL) in the 1972, 1973 and 1974 drafts. These players included:

Year	Round	Overall	Player name	Position	NFL team
1972 NFL draft	3	62	Johnny Musso	Running back	Chicago Bears
1972 NFL draft	11	266	David Bailey	Wide receiver	Green Bay Packers
1972 NFL draft	15	386	Robin Parkhouse	Linebacker	Baltimore Colts
1972 NFL draft	16	411	Steve Higginbotham	Defensive back	Washington Redskins
1973 NFL draft	1	4	John Hannah	Offensive guard	New England Patriots
1973 NFL draft	7	174	John Mitchell	Defensive end	San Francisco 49ers
1973 NFL draft	12	309	Jim Krapf	Guard	Oakland Raiders
1974 NFL draft	1	9	Wilbur Jackson	Running back	San Francisco 49ers
1974 NFL draft	3	54	Wayne Wheeler	Wide receiver	Chicago Bears
1974 NFL draft	6	138	Mike Raines	Defensive tackle	San Francisco 49ers
1974 NFL draft	8	187	Greg Gantt	Punter	New York Jets
1974 NFL draft	16	2	Buddy Brown	Guard	New York Giants

== Freshman squad ==
Prior to the 1972 NCAA University Division football season, NCAA rules prohibited freshmen from participating on the varsity team, and as such many schools fielded freshmen teams. The Alabama freshmen squad was led by coach Clem Gryska for the 1971 season and finished with a record of four wins and one loss (4–1). The Baby Tide opened the season with a 28–23 victory over Navy at Annapolis. After Randy Billingsley gave Alabama an early 7–0 lead with his nine-yard touchdown run, Navy responded with a trick play that saw Jim O'Brien throw a 33-yard touchdown pass to John Brodhead. In the second quarter, Billingsley scored on a one-yard touchdown run, and again the Midshipmen responded with a 20-yard Brodhead touchdown pass to Rhett Bray that made the halftime score 14–13. The Baby Tide extended their lead to 21–13 after Bob Holmes scored on a three-yard run on the first drive of the third quarter. However, Navy responded with a 46-yard Brodhead touchdown pass to Ward Hill and next with a safety and took a 23–21 lead. Ralph Stokes then went on and scored the game-winning touchdown for Alabama in the fourth quarter on a 38-yard run that made the final score 28–23.

In their only home game of the season, the Baby Tide ran for 359 yards and six touchdowns en route to a 41–7 win over Vanderbilt on a Friday afternoon. The next week, Alabama rallied from a 15-point deficit and defeated Tulane 23–22 at New Orleans. After Danny Ridgeway gave the Baby Tide an early 7–0 lead, Tulane responded with the next 22 points and opened a 22–7 lead. Green Wave points were scored on a 43-yard Steve Foley touchdown pass to Robert Johnson, a one-yard Foley touchdown run, a 50-yard John Washington punt return and on a 31-yard David Falgue field goal. Alabama then rallied for the 23–22 victory behind a pair of Bob Holmes touchdown runs and a pair of Ralph Stokes two-point conversions in the fourth quarter. At Knoxville, a 36–13 loss to the Volunteers ended an eight-game winning streak for the Baby Tide. Alabama took an early 7–0 lead after Duffy Boles scored on a one-yard run that was set up after the Baby Tide recovered a Tennessee fumble at their one-yard line. The Vols tied the game 7–7 early in the second quarter on a 35-yard Condredge Holloway touchdown pass to John Yarbrough. They then took a 10–7 lead later in the second on a 32-yard Ricky Townsend field goal, and then extended their lead to 16–7 at halftime behind a five-yard halfback pass from Neil Clabo to Holloway. Tennessee further extended their lead to 29–7 with a pair of touchdown runs from John Sapp and one from Kent Fullington in the third quarter. In the fourth, Jim Turley recovered a Tennessee fumble for a touchdown and Carl Stinson scored on a one-yard run for the Vols and made the final score 36–13.

In their final game of the season, before 15,000 fans at Cliff Hare Stadium, Alabama defeated Auburn 13–6. After a scoreless first half, Auburn scored their only points on a 48-yard Mike Fuller touchdown reception in the third quarter. Bob Holmes tied the game 6–6 late in the third with his one-yard run, and Randy Billingsley followed in the fourth quarter with his game-winning, two-yard touchdown run. In the game, the Tigers had seven turnovers and both teams missed several scoring opportunities.

Freshman "Baby Tide" roster: Danny Ridgeway/QB/#10, Mark Prudhomme/QB/#11, Duffy Boles/HB/#20, Ricky Davis/HB/#21, Mike Washington/HB/#24, James Taylor/FLK/#25, Bob Holmes/FB/#30, Randy Billingsley/HB/#31, Steve Ford/HB/#40, Mike Riley/HB/#41, Ralph Stokes/HB/#42, Gary Yelvington/HB/#43, Drew Cook/HB/#44, Ray Maxwell/LB/#45, Dwight Brown/LB/#46, Dennis Durrance/LB/#48, Mike Dubose/LB/#50, Dudley Sheppard/C/#51, Robert Brophy/E/#53, James Braasch/LB/#57, Steve Kulback/G/#60, Richard Whitley/G/#62, John Lewis/G/#63, Rodney Brown/G/#64, Rudy Wooten/T/#70, Barry McGee/T/#71, David Hagan/T/#72, John Hollis/T/#73, David Capan/T/#74, Lamar Langley/T/#75, Randy Hall/T/#76, Bob Bryan/T/#77, Rick Meadows/T/#78, Ronnie Barnes/E/#80, Terry Mager/E/#81, Joe Dale Harris/E/#82, Gene Lunceford/E/#83, Tom Nelson/E/#84, Glenn Turley/E/#85, Sylvester Croom/C/#87.

== Roster ==
1971 Alabama Crimson Tide football team roster
Players
Coaches
Offense

Pos.	#	Name	Class
WR	84	David Bailey	Sr
G	53	Marvin Barron	Jr
RB	35	Ellis Beck	Jr
RB	44	Steve Bisceglia	Jr
OT	65	Buddy Brown	So
TE	43	Richard Bryan	So
C	59	Chip Burke	So
WR	46	Jerry Cash	Sr
G		Joe Cochran	So
OT	70	Don Cokely	Sr
TE	47	Wayne Cotton	Jr
OT	75	Allen Cox	Jr
QB	10	Terry Davis	Jr
RB	39	Steve Dean	Jr
OT	91	Mike Denson	So
WR	31	Warren Dyar	Jr
C	69	Mike Eckenrod	Jr
G	62	Tommy Ford	Jr
C	55	Jimmy Grammer	Sr
OT	73	John Hannah	Jr
QB	17	Butch Hobson	Jr
TE	86	Jimmy Horton	Jr
G	60	Morris Hunt	Jr
WR	80	Wilbur Jackson	So
WR	19	Pat Keever	So
RB	30	Joe LaBue	Jr
C	58	Rand Lambert	So
C	51	Fred Marshall	Sr
TE	87	Randy Moore	Jr
RB	20	Phil Murphy	So
RB	22	Johnny Musso	Sr
WR	6	Pete Pappas	So
G	71	Steve Patterson	So
C	53	Pat Raines	Jr
G	79	Gary Reynolds	So
RB	16	Ron Richardson	Sr
QB	15	Benny Rippetoe	Sr
G	61	John Rogers	So
G	68	Rick Rogers	So
OT	72	Jimmy Rosser	Sr
QB	11	Gary Rutledge	So
WR	27	Bubba Sawyer	Sr
QB	14	Billy Sexton	Jr
TE	85	Jim Simmons	Sr
RB	24	Paul Spivey	So
OT	78	Steve Sprayberry	So
WR	34	Tommy Steakley	Sr
WR	88	Danny Taylor	Jr
WR	82	Wayne Wheeler	Jr
G	66	Jack White	Sr
WR	92	Dexter Wood	Jr
TE	7	Glenn Woodruff	Sr

Defense

Pos.	#	Name	Class
DB	21	Wayne Atkinson	Jr
DL	77	Jeff Beard	Sr
DB	25	Jeff Blitz	Jr
DB	48	Robin Cary	So
LB	52	Andy Cross	Jr
DE	83	John Croyle	Jr
DB	37	Jimmy Dawson	So
DB	41	Joe Doughty	So
DT		Woody Flowers	So
DE		Don Groves	So
LB	50	Wayne Hall	Jr
DB	49	Steve Higginbotham	Sr
DE	89	Ed Hines	Sr
DT	95	Skip Kubelius	So
LB	54	Jim Krapf	Jr
DE	98	Frank Lary	So
WR	81	Darrell Owen	So
DT	99	Greg Mantooth	So
DB	26	Bob McKinney	Jr
DB	18	David McMakin	So
LB	94	Noah Miller	So
DE	97	John Mitchell	Jr
DB	40	Lanny Norris	Jr
DE	90	Robin Parkhouse	Sr
DL	96	Jim Patterson	Sr
DT	74	Max Raines	So
DB	23	Mike Riley	Fr
LB	38	Ronnie Robertson	So
LB	67	Steve Root	Sr
LB	56	Jeff Rouzie	Jr
DB	29	Robby Rowan	Jr
DL	57	Terry Rowell	Sr
DB	23	Johnny Sharpless	So
LB	36	Chuck Strickland	So
LB	42	Tom Surlas	Sr
DB	33	Carl Tayloe	Jr
DB	32	Steve Wade	Jr
DE	93	David Watkins	So
DL	76	Mitchell Weaver	Jr
DB	28	Steve Williams	Sr

Special teams

Pos.	#	Name	Class
PK	1	Bill Davis	So
PK	8	Greg Gantt	So
PK	9	John Dorough	So

Head coach

- Bear Bryant (14th year, Alabama)

Coordinators/assistant coaches

- John David Crow (3rd year, Texas A&M)
- Ken Donahue (8th year, Tennessee)
- Pat Dye (7th year, Georgia)
- Jim Goostree (15th year, Tennessee)
- Clem Gryska (12th year, Alabama)
- Dude Hennessey (12th year, Kentucky)
- Ken Martin (1st year, Alabama)
- Mal Moore (8th year, Alabama)
- Bill Oliver (1st year, Alabama)
- Dee Powell (8th year, Texas A&M)
- Jack Rutledge (6th year, Alabama)
- Jimmy Sharpe (9th year, Alabama)
- Bob Tyler (1st year, Ole Miss)
- Richard Williamson (8th year, Alabama)

Legend

- (C) Team captain
- (S) Suspended
- (I) Ineligible
- Injured
- Redshirt

Roster
Last update: October 15, 2013
