= 1971 NCAA University Division football rankings =

- Season: 1971
- Bowl season: 1971–72 bowl games
- Preseason No. 1: Notre Dame
- End of season champions: Nebraska

Two human polls comprised the 1971 NCAA University Division football rankings. Unlike most sports, college football's governing body, the NCAA, does not bestow a national championship, instead that title is bestowed by one or more different polling agencies. There are two main weekly polls that begin in the preseason—the AP Poll and the Coaches Poll.

== Legend ==
| | Increase in ranking |
| | Decrease in ranking |
| | Not ranked previous week |
| | National champion |
| (#–#) | Win–loss record |
| (Italics) | Number of first place votes |
| т | Tied with team above or below also with this symbol |

== AP Poll ==
For the first time, the top two teams in the final poll were from the same conference; Nebraska (13–0) and Oklahoma (11–1) were joined by Colorado (10–2) in third for a sweep by the Big Eight Conference.

| | Preseason Aug | Week 1 Sep 13 | Week 2 Sep 20 | Week 3 Sep 27 | Week 4 Oct 4 | Week 5 Oct 11 | Week 6 Oct 18 | Week 7 Oct 25 | Week 8 Nov 1 | Week 9 Nov 8 | Week 10 Nov 15 | Week 11 Nov 22 | Week 12 Nov 29 | Week 13 Dec 6 | Week 14 (Final) Jan 3 | |
|---|---|---|---|---|---|---|---|---|---|---|---|---|---|---|---|---|
| 1. | Notre Dame (15) | Nebraska (1–0) (31) | Nebraska (2–0) (32) | Nebraska (3–0) (44) | Nebraska (4–0) (43) | Nebraska (5–0) (40) | Nebraska (6–0) (35) | Nebraska (7–0) (31) | Nebraska (8–0) (34) | Nebraska (9–0) (41) | Nebraska (10–0) (40) | Nebraska (10–0) (40) | Nebraska (11–0) (48) | Nebraska (12–0) (48) | Nebraska (13–0) (55) | 1. |
| 2. | Nebraska (26) | Notre Dame (0–0) (10) | Notre Dame (1–0) (18) | Michigan (3–0) (3) | Michigan (4–0) (5) | Oklahoma (4–0) (8) | Oklahoma (5–0) (18) | Oklahoma (6–0) (21) | Oklahoma (7–0) (17) | Oklahoma (8–0) (6) | Oklahoma (9–0) (8) | Oklahoma (9–0) (8) | Alabama (11–0) (4) | Alabama (11–0) (4) | Oklahoma (11–1) | 2. |
| 3. | Texas (5) | Texas (0–0) (5) | Texas (1–0) (3) | Texas (2–0) (3) | Texas (3–0) (3) | Michigan (5–0) (4) | Michigan (6–0) (1) | Michigan (7–0) (1) | Michigan (8–0) (2) | Michigan (9–0) (6) | Michigan (10–0) (4) | Alabama (10–0) (1) | Oklahoma (9–1) | Oklahoma (10–1) | Colorado (10–2) | 3. |
| 4. | Michigan (1) | Michigan (1–0) (2) | Michigan (2–0) | Notre Dame (2–0) (1) | Auburn (3–0) (2) | Alabama (5–0) | Alabama (6–0) | Alabama (7–0) (1) | Alabama (8–0) | Alabama (9–0) | Alabama (10–0) (1) | Michigan (11–0) (3) | Michigan (11–0) (2) | Michigan (11–0) (3) | Alabama (11–1) | 4. |
| 5. | USC (1) | Ohio State (1–0) | Auburn (1–0) (2) | Auburn (2–0) (2) | Colorado (4–0) (2) | Auburn (4–0) (2) | Auburn (5–0) (1) | Auburn (6–0) (1) | Auburn (7–0) (1) | Penn State (8–0) (1) | Auburn (9–0) (1) | Auburn (9–0) (1) | Penn State (10–0) (1) | Auburn (9–1) | Penn State (11–1) | 5. |
| 6. | Auburn (1) | Arkansas (1–0) | Ohio State (1–0) | Colorado (3–0) (2) | Alabama (4–0) | Colorado (5–0) (1) | Notre Dame (5–0) | Penn State (6–0) | Penn State (7–0) (1) | Auburn (8–0) (1) | Penn State (9–0) (1) | Penn State (10–0) (2) | Auburn (9–1) | Georgia (10–1) | Michigan (11–1) | 6. |
| 7. | Arkansas | Auburn (0–0) (2) | Arkansas (2–0) | Alabama (3–0) | Notre Dame (3–0) | Notre Dame (4–0) | Penn State (5–0) | Georgia (7–0) | Georgia (8–0) | Georgia (9–0) | Notre Dame (8–1) | Georgia (9–1) | Georgia (10–1) | Colorado (9–2) | Georgia (11–1) | 7. |
| 8. | Tennessee | Tennessee (0–0) | Alabama (2–0) | Oklahoma (2–0) | Oklahoma (3–0) | Georgia (5–0) | Georgia (6–0) | Arkansas (6–1) | Notre Dame (6–1) | Notre Dame (7–1) | Georgia (9–1) | Colorado (9–2) | Colorado (9–2) | Arizona State (10–1) | Arizona State (11–1) | 8. |
| 9. | LSU | Alabama (1–0) | Tennessee (1–0) | Penn State (2–0) | Penn State (3–0) | Penn State (4–0) | Arkansas (5–1) | Colorado (6–1) | Ohio State (6–1) | Arizona State (7–1) | Arizona State (8–1) | Arizona State (9–1) | Arizona State (10–1) | Tennessee (9–2) | Tennessee (10–2) | 9. |
| 10. | Oklahoma | Oklahoma (0–0) | Colorado (2–0) | Stanford (3–0) | Georgia (4–0) | Texas (3–1) | Stanford (5–1) | Ohio State (5–1) | Arizona State (6–1) | Stanford (7–2) | Colorado (8–2) | LSU (7–3) | LSU (8–3) | Penn State (10–1) | Stanford (9–3) | 10. |
| 11. | Ohio State | Georgia (1–0) | Oklahoma (1–0) | Georgia (3–0) | Washington (4–0) | Arizona State (4–0) | Colorado (5–1) | LSU (5–1) | Tennessee (5–2) | Tennessee (6–2) | Tennessee (6–2) | Tennessee (7–2) | Texas (8–2) | LSU (8–3) | LSU (9–3) | 11. |
| 12. | Penn State | Colorado (1–0) | Penn State (1–0) | Tennessee (1–1) | Arizona State (3–0) | LSU (4–1) | Ohio State (4–1) | Notre Dame (5–1) | Stanford (6–2) | Colorado (7–2) | Texas (7–2) | Texas (7–2) | Tennessee (8–2) | Texas (8–2) | Auburn (9–2) | 12. |
| 13. | Syracuse | Stanford (1–0) | Stanford (2–0) | Arizona State (2–0) | Tennessee (2–1) | Ohio State (3–1) | LSU (5–1) | Arizona State (5–1) | Colorado (6–2) | Texas (6–2) | Toledo (10–0) | Notre Dame (8–2) | Toledo (11–0) | Notre Dame (8–2) | Notre Dame (8–2) | 13. |
| 14. | Arizona State | Penn State (0–0) | Georgia (2–0) | Ohio State (1–1) | Duke (4–0) | Tennessee (3–1) | Arizona State (4–1) т | Texas (4–2) | Toledo (8–0) | Toledo (9–0) | LSU (6–3) | Toledo (11–0) | Notre Dame (8–2) | Toledo (11–0) | Toledo (12–0) | 14. |
| 15. | UCLA | Syracuse (0–0) | Arizona State (1–0) | Washington (3–0) | Ohio State (2–1) | Stanford (4–1) | Toledo (6–0) т | Toledo (7–0) | Texas (5–2) | USC (5–4) | USC (6–4) | Houston (8–2) | Houston (9–2) | Houston (9–2) | Mississippi (10–2) | 15. |
| 16. | Alabama | Arizona State (0–0) | USC (1–1) | LSU (2–1) | LSU (3–1) | Arkansas (4–1) | Texas (3–2) | Tennessee (4–2) | Arkansas (6–2) | Ohio State (6–2) | Houston (7–2) | Stanford (8–3) | Arkansas (8–2–1) т | Stanford (8–3) | Arkansas (8–3–1) | 16. |
| 17. | Georgia Tech | USC (0–1) | Washington (2–0) | USC (2–1) | Arkansas (3–1) | Toledo (5–0) | Purdue (3–2) | Stanford (5–2) | USC (4–4) | Arkansas (6–2–1) | Arkansas (7–2–1) | Arkansas (8–2–1) | Stanford (8–3) т | Mississippi (9–2) | Houston (9–3) | 17. |
| 18. | Georgia | Michigan State (1–0) | LSU (1–1) | Arkansas (2–1) | North Carolina (4–0) | Washington (4–1) | Tennessee (3–2) | Air Force (5–1) | LSU (5–2) | Houston (6–2) | Stanford (7–3) | Mississippi (8–2) | Mississippi (9–2) т | Arkansas (8–2–1) | Texas (8–3) | 18. |
| 19. | Stanford | South Carolina (1–0) | Toledo (2–0) | Duke (3–0) | Stanford (3–1) | Florida State (5–0) | Duke (5–1) | Florida State (6–1) | Houston (5–2) | Washington (7–2) | Michigan State (6–4) | North Carolina (9–2) | North Carolina (9–2) т | Northwestern (7–4) | Washington (8–3) | 19. |
| 20. | Northwestern (1) | Houston (1–0) | Duke (2–0) | North Carolina (3–0) | Toledo (4–0) | Purdue (2–2) | Air Force (4–1) | USC (3–4) | Washington (6–2) | LSU (5–3) | Mississippi (8–2) | Washington (8–3) | Washington (8–3) | Washington (8–3) | USC (6–4–1) | 20. |
| | Preseason Aug | Week 1 Sep 13 | Week 2 Sep 20 | Week 3 Sep 27 | Week 4 Oct 4 | Week 5 Oct 11 | Week 6 Oct 18 | Week 7 Oct 25 | Week 8 Nov 1 | Week 9 Nov 8 | Week 10 Nov 15 | Week 11 Nov 22 | Week 12 Nov 29 | Week 13 Dec 6 | Week 14 (Final) Jan 3 | |
| | | Dropped: Georgia Tech; LSU; Northwestern; UCLA | Dropped: Houston; Michigan State; South Carolina; Syracuse | Dropped: Toledo | Dropped: USC | Dropped: Duke; North Carolina | Dropped: Florida State; Washington | Dropped: Duke; Purdue | Dropped: Air Force; Florida State | None | Dropped: Ohio State; Washington | Dropped: Michigan State; USC | None | Dropped: North Carolina | Dropped: Northwestern | |

== Final Coaches Poll ==
The final UPI Coaches Poll was released prior to the bowl games, in early December.
Nebraska received 29 of the 31 first place votes; Alabama received the other two.

| Ranking | Team | Conference | Bowl |
|---|---|---|---|
| 1 | Nebraska | Big Eight | Won Orange, 38–6 |
| 2 | Alabama | SEC | Lost Orange, 6–38 |
| 3 | Oklahoma | Big Eight | Won Sugar, 40–22 |
| 4 | Michigan | Big Ten | Lost Rose, 12–13 |
| 5 | Auburn | SEC | Lost Sugar, 22–40 |
| 6 | Arizona State | WAC | Won Fiesta, 45–38 |
| 7 | Colorado | Big Eight | Won Bluebonnet, 31–21 |
| 8 | Georgia | SEC | Won Gator, 7–3 |
| 9 | Tennessee | SEC | Won Liberty, 14–13 |
| 10 | LSU | SEC | Won Sun, 33–15 |
| 11 | Penn State | Independent | Won Cotton, 30–6 |
| 12 | Texas | Southwest | Lost Cotton, 6–30 |
| 13 | Toledo | Mid-American | Won Tangerine, 28–3 |
| 14 | Houston | Independent | Lost Bluebonnet, 21–31 |
| 15 | Notre Dame | Independent | none (declined) |
| 16 | Stanford | Pac-8 | Won Rose, 13–12 |
| 17 | Iowa State | Big Eight | Lost Sun, 15–33 |
| 18 | North Carolina | ACC | Lost Gator, 3–7 |
| 19 | Florida State | Independent | Lost Fiesta, 38–45 |
| 20 | Arkansas | Southwest | Lost Liberty, 13–14 |
| 20 | Mississippi | SEC | Won Peach, 13–12 |

- Prior to the 1975 season, the Big Ten and Pac-8 conferences allowed only one postseason participant each, for the Rose Bowl.
