= 1971 Sun Bowl =

American college football game

LSU Tigers	Iowa State Cyclones
(8–3)	(8–3)
SEC	Big Eight
33	15
Head coach: Charles McClendon	Head coach: Johnny Majors
AP / Coaches; 11 / 10	Coaches 17
	1	2	3	4	Total
LSU	6	0	13	14	33
Iowa State	0	3	6	6	15
- Date: December 31, 1971
- Season: 1971
- Stadium: Sun Bowl
- Location: El Paso, Texas
- MVP: QB Bert Jones
- Referee: William Jennings (Big Eight; split crew: Big Eight, SEC)
- Attendance: 33,503

United States TV coverage
- Network: CBS

The 1971 Sun Bowl was a college football postseason bowl game between the LSU Tigers and the Iowa State Cyclones.

== Background ==
LSU tied for 6th in the Southeastern Conference while the Cyclones tied for 4th in the Big Eight Conference. This was the first Sun Bowl for the Tigers and Cyclones, along with the first bowl appearance for Iowa State. This was the first Sun Bowl game to have all tickets be sold. George Amundson was the first Cyclone to rush for over 1,000 yards.

== Game summary ==
Bert Jones completed 12-of-18 passes for 227 yards and three touchdowns passing and one rushing touchdown in an MVP effort. LSU scored early on two Jay Michaelson field goals, but Iowa State responded with a field goal of their own to make it 6–3. The Tigers had the ball at the ISU 4 late in the half, but they turned it over on downs, and the half soon ended. In the second half, LSU broke the game open. Jones threw two touchdown passes in the third quarter, one to Andy Hamilton from 37 yards out, and one to Gerald Keigley from 21 yards out to make it 19–3. Iowa State responded late in the quarter with a Dean Carlson 30-yard touchdown pass to Larry Marquardt to make it 19–9. In the fourth, Carlson threw a 1-yard pass to Keith Krepfle to make it 19–15 early in the fourth. Jones responded with his third touchdown pass, this time to Michaelson, to make it 26–15. Jay Michaelson. With 3:00 remaining, Jones ran for a touchdown to make it 33–15. George Amundson was held to 56 yards.
