= 1971 Liberty Bowl =

American college football game

- 13th Liberty Bowl
Arkansas Razorbacks	Tennessee Volunteers
(8–2–1)	(9–2)
SWC	SEC
13	14
Head coach: Frank Broyles	Head coach: Bill Battle
AP / Coaches; 18 / 20	AP / Coaches; 9 / 9
	1	2	3	4	Total
Arkansas	0	7	0	6	13
Tennessee	7	0	0	7	14
- Date: December 20, 1971
- Season: 1971
- Stadium: Memphis Memorial Stadium
- Location: Memphis, Tennessee
- MVP: Joe Ferguson, Arkansas
- Referee: McDuff Simpson (SWC; split crew: SWC, SEC)
- Attendance: 45,410

United States TV coverage
- Network: ABC
- Announcers: Chris Schenkel, Bud Wilkinson

The 1971 Liberty Bowl was a college football postseason bowl game between the Arkansas Razorbacks and the Tennessee Volunteers, played on December 20, 1971, in Memphis, Tennessee. In the 13th edition of the Liberty Bowl, ninth-ranked Tennessee defeated 18th-ranked Arkansas, 14–13.

== Controversy ==
The game was wrought with controversy, mainly due to two calls in the game by SEC official Preston Watts that favored Tennessee. An Arkansas field goal was wiped out due to a phantom holding call on Arkansas tight end Bobby Nichols. Nichols stated after the game that a Vols player grabbed him and pulled him to the ground, yet Watts flagged Nichols for the holding penalty.

The second controversial call came in the fourth quarter when Arkansas fumbled the ball, but Razorback player Tom Reed recovered, and actually handed the ball to Preston Watts. Watts unceremoniously signaled that the ball had been recovered by Tennessee, and gave possession to the Volunteers at the Arkansas 37 yard line. Tennessee would score a touchdown a few plays later to take the lead.

Watts was born and raised in Tennessee. This controversy prompted the NCAA to change its rules concerning officiating in bowl games. No longer would bowl game officiating crews be split between the conferences of the competing teams; rather, officiating crews would be composed of officials from conferences not playing in that bowl game.

== Setting ==
=== #18 Arkansas ===
Arkansas defeated #7 Cal in War Memorial Stadium to open the season, but suffered a one-point defeat to an unranked Tulsa team two weeks later. The Hogs would upset #10 Texas in Little Rock also, but lost to Texas A&M and tied Rice, costing the Hogs the Southwest Conference.

== Game summary ==
The Volunteers took the lead first, with a two-yard run by Bill Rudder. The Hogs responded with a 36-yard TD strike from Joe Ferguson to Jim Hodge. Scoring wouldn't resume until the fourth quarter, when Razorback Bill McClard kicked 19- and 30-yard field goals. A third McClard kick was good, set up by Louis Campbell's third interception, but a penalty kept the Hogs off the board a fourth time. Arkansas fumbled at their own 36-yard line, and Tennessee's Curt Watson scored three plays later.

Scoring summary

Quarter	Time	Drive			Team	Scoring information	Score	
Quarter	Time	Plays	Yards	TOP	Team	Scoring information	ARK	UT
1	6:39		55		UT	Bill Rudder 2-yard touchdown run, George Hunt kick good	0	7
2	4:11		66		ARK	Jim Hodge 36-yard touchdown reception from Joe Ferguson, Bill McClard kick good	7	7
4	13:14		52		ARK	19-yard field goal by Bill McClard	10	7
4	8:51		30		ARK	30-yard field goal by Bill McClard	13	7
4	1:56		37		UT	Curt Watson 17-yard touchdown run, George Hunt kick good	13	14
"TOP" = time of possession. For other American football terms, see Glossary of American football.							13	14

Arkansas set a Liberty Bowl record with 104 interception return yards in the contest. This record still stands. Louis Campbell of Arkansas had three interceptions, also a Liberty Bowl Record.
