= List of Colorado Buffaloes bowl games =

This is a List of Colorado Buffaloes bowl games. The Colorado Buffaloes have played in 31 bowl games in their history, compiling a record of 12–19.

== Bowl games ==
Season	Bowl	Opponent	Result	Attendance
1937	Cotton	Rice	L 14–28	35,000
1956	Orange	Clemson	W 27–21	72,552
1961	Orange	LSU	L 7–25	62,391
1967	Bluebonnet	Miami (FL)	W 31–21	30,156
1969	Liberty	Alabama	W 47–33	50,144
1970	Liberty	Tulane	L 3–17	44,500
1971	Bluebonnet	Houston	W 29–17	54,720
1972	Gator	Auburn	L 3–24	71,114
1975	Bluebonnet	Texas	L 21–38	52,728
1976	Orange	Ohio State	L 10–27	65,537
1985	Freedom	Washington	L 17–20	30,961
1986	Bluebonnet	Baylor	L 9–21	40,470
1988	Freedom	BYU	L 17–20	35,941
1989	Orange	Notre Dame	L 6–21	81,191
1990	Orange	Notre Dame	W 10–9	77,062
1991	Blockbuster	Alabama	L 25–30	52,644
1992	Fiesta	Syracuse	L 22–26	70,224
1993	Aloha	Fresno State	W 41–30	44,009
1994	Fiesta	Notre Dame	W 41–24	73,968
1995	Cotton	Oregon	W 38–6	58,214
1996	Holiday	Washington	W 33–21	54,749
1998	Aloha	Oregon	W 51–43	34,803
1999	Insight.com	Boston College	W 62–28	35,762
2001	Fiesta	Oregon	L 16–38	74,118
2002	Alamo	Wisconsin	L 28–31 (OT)	50,690
2004	Houston	UTEP	W 33–28	27,235
2005	Champs Sports	Clemson	L 10–19	31,470
2007	Independence	Alabama	L 24–30	47,043
2016	Alamo	Oklahoma State	L 8–38	59,815
2020	Alamo	Texas	L 23–55	10,822
2024	Alamo	BYU	L 14–36	64,261
