= Eddie Crowder =

American football player, coach, and athletic director (1931–2008)

- Crowder as head coach at Colorado

Biographical details
- Born: August 26, 1931; Arkansas City, Kansas, U.S.
- Died: September 9, 2008 (aged 77); Lafayette, Colorado, U.S.

Playing career
- 1950–1952: Oklahoma
- 1953: Edmonton Eskimos
- Position: Quarterback

Coaching career (HC unless noted)
- 1955: Army (offensive backs)
- 1956–1962: Oklahoma (offensive backs)
- 1963–1973: Colorado

Administrative career (AD unless noted)
- 1965–1984: Colorado

Head coaching record
- Overall: 67–49–2
- Bowls: 3–2

Accomplishments and honors

Championships
- National (1950)

Awards
- Big Eight Coach of the Year (1965); 2× First-team All-Big Seven (1951, 1952)

Eddie Crowder (August 26, 1931 – September 9, 2008) was an American football player and coach. He was an All-American quarterback (QB) and safety at the University of Oklahoma (OU) in the early 1950s and a successful head coach and athletic director (AD) at the University of Colorado (CU) in the 1960s and 1970s.

He is quoted as saying "Life is boring for someone trying to achieve greatness."

== Early life ==
Born in Arkansas City, Kansas, Crowder was raised in Muskogee, Oklahoma. He played quarterback at Muskogee Central High School and won the state championship in 1948.

== Playing career ==
Crowder was a member of Oklahoma's first National Football Championship team in 1950, and led Oklahoma to two Big Seven titles as quarterback in 1951 and 1952 and was selected all-conference the same years. Oklahoma was 26–4–1 (.855) during his three years as a player. He was 61 for 110 (.555) (might be 60 for 109 (.550)) with 11 touchdowns for 1189 (might be 1179) yards passing.

He was selected in the second round (22nd overall) of the 1953 NFL draft by the New York Giants. He declined due to a nerve problem in his throwing arm and served in the U.S. Army Corps of Engineers as quarterback of the Fort Hood team for 1953. His jersey number was 16 and was listed at 6 ft 0 in (1.83 m) and 170 lb (77 kg).

Although selected by the Giants, Crowder went to Canada in 1953 and played the first half of the season with the Edmonton Eskimos, alternating starts at quarterback with Claude Arnold. He was cut by head coach Darrell Royal because of limitations on the number of American players that a team could carry past a certain date. Crowder led the Eskimos to victory in all four of his games, but Royal decided to stick with the veteran Arnold. In a game in Calgary on September 5, Crowder played the full game at quarterback without throwing a single pass; all the passes were thrown by halfbacks Rollie Miles and Billy Vessels. "Easy Ed" was one of many Oklahoma grads to play for the Eskimos in the 1950s.

== Coaching career ==
Crowder was an assistant coach under Red Blaik at Army in 1955 and for Bud Wilkinson back at Oklahoma for seven seasons (1956–1962). In January 1963 at age 31, he became the head coach of the Buffaloes; his initial contract was for five years at $15,000 per year. He restored the program's respectability and earned national respect while rebuilding the program.

In Crowder's ninth season in 1971, CU was third in the nation at 10–2, behind only Big Eight rivals Nebraska (1) and Oklahoma (2). This was the first time that two teams from the same conference topped the final poll, and it remains as the only time that a conference had the top three.

Crowder currently has the third best record as head coach at Colorado at 67–49–2 (.576). His teams went to five bowl games while he was head coach: the 1967 Bluebonnet (W), 1969 Liberty (W), 1970 Liberty (L), and 1971 Astro-Bluebonnet (W), 1972 Gator (L). He assumed the athletic director duties in 1965, retired from coaching in December 1973, and hired his three replacements: Bill Mallory (1974–1978), Chuck Fairbanks (1978–1981), and most importantly, Bill McCartney (1982–1994), CU's all-time winningest coach at 93–55–5 (.624).

With a final annual salary of $52,800, Crowder stepped down as athletic director in 1984, succeeded by Bill Marolt.

== Later years ==
With his wife Kate, Crowder continued to reside in Boulder after his retirement from CU. He maintained ties to both the Oklahoma and Colorado football programs, and assisted in the selections of Oklahoma head coach Bob Stoops and Colorado head coach Dan Hawkins. He was also a voter in the Harris College Football Poll. Crowder battled Hodgkin's lymphoma in 2003, and died of leukemia in 2008.

== Head coaching record ==
Year	Team	Overall	Conference	Standing	Bowl/playoffs	Coaches^{#}	AP^{°}
Colorado Buffaloes (Big Eight Conference) (1963–1973)
1963	Colorado	2–8	2–5	6th			
1964	Colorado	2–8	1–6	7th			
1965	Colorado	6–2–2	4–2–1	3rd		20	
1966	Colorado	7–3	5–2	2nd			
1967	Colorado	9–2	5–2	T–2nd	W Bluebonnet	13	
1968	Colorado	4–6	3–4	T–4th			
1969	Colorado	8–3	5–2	3rd	W Liberty		16
1970	Colorado	6–5	3–4	4th	L Liberty	16	
1971	Colorado	10–2	5–2	3rd	W Astro-Bluebonnet	7	3
1972	Colorado	8–4	4–3	T–3rd	L Gator	14	16
1973	Colorado	5–6	2–5	T–6th			
Colorado:		67–49–2	39–37–1				
Total:		67–49–2					
^{#}Rankings from final Coaches Poll.; ^{°}Rankings from final AP Poll.

== Awards and honors ==
- All-Conference (Big Seven) 1951, 1952
- All-American, 1952
- Colorado Sports Hall of Fame, 1990
- Oklahoma Sports Hall of Fame, 2003
- University of Colorado athletic hall of fame, 2004
- FWAA Citation of Honor, 2007
