= 1970 Oklahoma Sooners football team =

American college football season

1970 Oklahoma Sooners football
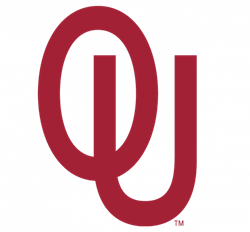

Astro-Bluebonnet Bowl, T 24–24 vs. Alabama
- Conference: Big Eight Conference

Ranking
- Coaches: No. 15
- AP: No. 20
- Record: 7–4–1 (5–2 Big 8)
- Head coach: Chuck Fairbanks (4th season)
- Offensive coordinator: Barry Switzer (5th season)
- Offensive scheme: I formation (first 3 games); Wishbone (final 9 games)
- Defensive coordinator: Larry Lacewell (1st season)
- Captains: Steve Casteel; Monty Johnson
- Home stadium: Oklahoma Memorial Stadium

1970 Big Eight Conference football standings
	Conf.					Overall
Team	W		L		T	W		L		T
No. 1 Nebraska $	7	–	0	–	0	11	–	0	–	1
No. 20 Oklahoma	5	–	2	–	0	7	–	4	–	1
Kansas State	5	–	2	–	0	6	–	5	–	0
Missouri	3	–	4	–	0	5	–	6	–	0
Colorado	3	–	4	–	0	6	–	5	–	0
Kansas	2	–	5	–	0	5	–	6	–	0
Oklahoma State	2	–	5	–	0	4	–	7	–	0
Iowa State	1	–	6	–	0	5	–	6	–	0
$ – Conference champion; Rankings from AP Poll

The 1970 Oklahoma Sooners football team represented the University of Oklahoma in the 1970 NCAA University Division football season, the 76th season of Sooner football. The team was led by head coach Chuck Fairbanks in his fourth season as the OU head coach. They played their home games at Gaylord Family Oklahoma Memorial Stadium in Norman, Oklahoma. They were a member of the Big Eight Conference.

Conference play began at Folsom Field in Boulder, Colorado on October 17, with a win over the Colorado Buffaloes, and ended on November 28 at home in Norman with a win over Oklahoma State in the annual Bedlam Series. The Sooners lost their second conference game to Kansas State; the Wildcats' next victory in the series did not occur until 1993.

Following a loss in their third game to Oregon State, the Sooners installed the wishbone offense during the open week prior to the Red River Shootout against Texas. The Sooners ran the wishbone continuously, save for a switch to the I formation in 1982 and 1983, until the early 1990s.

After finishing the regular season with a record of 7–4 (5–2 in Big 8 play), the Sooners were invited to play in the Astro-Bluebonnet Bowl, where they tied the Alabama Crimson Tide, 24–24.

Following the season, John Watson was selected in the seventh round of the 1971 NFL draft, and Steve Casteel was chosen in the 10th.

== Schedule ==
Date	Time	Opponent	Rank	Site	TV	Result	Attendance	Source
September 12		at SMU*	No. T–20	Cotton Bowl; Dallas, TX		W 28–11	51,909	
September 19		Wisconsin*	No. 18	Oklahoma Memorial Stadium; Norman, OK		W 21–7	58,100	
September 26		Oregon State*	No. 14	Oklahoma Memorial Stadium; Norman, OK		L 14–23	54,700	
October 10		vs. No. 2 Texas*		Cotton Bowl; Dallas, TX (Red River Shootout)	ABC	L 9–41	71,938	
October 17		at No. 13 Colorado		Folsom Field; Boulder, CO		W 23–15	47,700	
October 24		Kansas State		Oklahoma Memorial Stadium; Norman, OK		L 14–19	60,800	
October 31	1:30 p.m.	at Iowa State		Clyde Williams Field; Ames, IA		W 29–28	27,000	
November 7		Missouri		Oklahoma Memorial Stadium; Norman, OK (rivalry)		W 28–13	54,750	
November 14		at Kansas		Memorial Stadium; Lawrence, KS		W 28–24	38,200	
November 21		at No. 3 Nebraska		Memorial Stadium; Lincoln, NE (rivalry)		L 21–28	67,392	
November 28		Oklahoma State		Oklahoma Memorial Stadium; Norman, OK (Bedlam Series)		W 66–6	60,300	
December 31		vs. Alabama*	No. 24	Houston Astrodome; Houston, TX (Astro-Bluebonnet Bowl)		T 24–24	53,822	
*Non-conference game; Rankings from AP Poll released prior to the game; All times are in Central time

== Rankings ==
Ranking movements Legend: ██ Increase in ranking ██ Decrease in ranking — = Not ranked т = Tied with team above or below
	Week														
Poll	Pre	1	2	3	4	5	6	7	8	9	10	11	12	13	Final
AP	20 т	18	14	—	—	—	—	—	—	—	—	—	20	20	20 т

== Roster ==
1970 Oklahoma Sooners football team roster
Players
Coaches
Offense

Pos.	#	Name	Class
HB	35	Roy Bell	Jr
FB	17	Leon Crosswhite	So
OE	82	Al Chandler	So
QB	11	Jack Mildren	Jr
SE	83	Greg Pruitt	So
QB	15	Dave Robertson	So
OT	71	Nelson Todd	Jr
OT	76	John Watson	Sr

Defense

Pos.	#	Name	Class
LB	43	Steve Aycock	Jr
WB	37	Gary Jamar	Sr
S	25	Monty Johnson	Sr
DT	99	John Nicholson	Sr
DHB	19	Geoffrey Nordgren	Jr
DHB	18	Steve O'Shaughnessy	Jr

Special teams

Pos.	#	Name	Class

Head coach

- Chuck Fairbanks

Coordinators/assistant coaches

- Jim Dickey (DB)
- Galen Hall (WR)
- Warren Harper (LB)
- Gene Hochevar
- Jimmy Johnson (DL)
- Larry Lacewell (DC)
- Bill Michael (OL)
- Barry Switzer (OC)

Legend

- (C) Team captain
- (S) Suspended
- (I) Ineligible
- Injured
- Redshirt

Roster

== NFL draft ==
The following players were selected into the 1971 NFL draft following the season.

Round	Pick	Player	Position	NFL team
7	179	John Watson	Tackle	San Francisco 49ers
10	258	Steve Casteel	Linebacker	Cleveland Browns
17	427	Monty Johnson	Defensive back	Green Bay Packers
