= 1970 Iowa State Cyclones football team =

American college football season

1970 Iowa State Cyclones football
- Conference: Big Eight Conference
- Record: 5–6 (1–6 Big 8)
- Head coach: Johnny Majors (3rd season)
- Offensive coordinator: Gordon Smith
- Defensive coordinator: Jackie Sherrill (1st season)
- Captains: Tony Washington; Mark Withrow
- Home stadium: Clyde Williams Field

1970 Big Eight Conference football standings
	Conf.					Overall
Team	W		L		T	W		L		T
No. 1 Nebraska $	7	–	0	–	0	11	–	0	–	1
No. 20 Oklahoma	5	–	2	–	0	7	–	4	–	1
Kansas State	5	–	2	–	0	6	–	5	–	0
Missouri	3	–	4	–	0	5	–	6	–	0
Colorado	3	–	4	–	0	6	–	5	–	0
Kansas	2	–	5	–	0	5	–	6	–	0
Oklahoma State	2	–	5	–	0	4	–	7	–	0
Iowa State	1	–	6	–	0	5	–	6	–	0
$ – Conference champion; Rankings from AP Poll

The 1970 Iowa State Cyclones football team represented Iowa State University in the Big Eight Conference during the 1970 NCAA University Division football season. In their third year under head coach Johnny Majors, the Cyclones compiled a 5–6 record (1–6 against conference opponents), finished in last place in the conference, and were outscored by opponents by a combined total of 284 to 248. They played their home games at Clyde Williams Field in Ames, Iowa.

Tony Washington and Mark Withrow were the team captains.

== Schedule ==
Date	Time	Opponent	Site	Result	Attendance	Source
September 19	8:30 p.m.	at New Mexico*	University Stadium; Albuquerque, NM	W 32–3	18,068	
September 26	1:30 p.m.	Colorado State*	Clyde Williams Field; Ames, IA	W 37–6	25,000	
October 3	2:30 p.m.	at Utah*	Ute Stadium; Salt Lake City, UT	W 16–13	23,771	
October 10	2:30 p.m.	at No. 17 Colorado	Folsom Field; Boulder, CO	L 10–61	40,840	
October 17	1:30 p.m.	Kansas State	Clyde Williams Field; Ames, IA (rivalry)	L 0–17	28,000	
October 24	1:30 p.m.	at Kansas	Memorial Stadium; Lawrence, KS	L 10–24	37,750	
October 31	1:30 p.m.	Oklahoma^{†}	Clyde Williams Field; Ames, IA	L 28–29	27,000	
November 7	1:30 p.m.	No. 4 Nebraska	Clyde Williams Field; Ames, IA (rivalry)	L 29–54	36,000	
November 14	1:30 p.m.	at Missouri	Memorial Stadium; Columbia, MO (rivalry)	W 31–19	56,000	
November 21	1:30 p.m.	at Oklahoma State	Lewis Field; Stillwater, OK	L 27–36	19,500	
November 28	10:03 p.m.	at San Diego State*	San Diego Stadium; San Diego, CA	W 28–22	31,810	
*Non-conference game; ^{†}Homecoming; Rankings from AP Poll released prior to the game; All times are in Central time

== Roster ==
1970 Iowa State Cyclones football team roster
Players
Coaches
Offense

Pos.	#	Name	Class
QB	10	Bill Reding	Jr
QB	11	Skip Sullivan	So
RB	12	George Amundson	So
QB	15	Dean Carlson	Jr
RB	23	Brian Cannon	So
RB	32	Mike Zuk	So
G	64	Scott Seeliger	So
WR	85	Otto Stowe	Sr

Defense

Pos.	#	Name	Class
S	13	Dave McCurry	So
DB	21	Jeff Allen	Sr
LB	47	Jeff Steckmesser	So
DE	86	Merv Krakau	So
DE	91	Andy Walker	Sr
DE	97	Mike Daly	So

Special teams

Pos.	#	Name	Class

Head coach

- Bill Meek

Coordinators/assistant coaches

Legend

- (C) Team captain
- (S) Suspended
- (I) Ineligible
- Injured
- Redshirt
