= List of Oklahoma State Cowboys head football coaches =

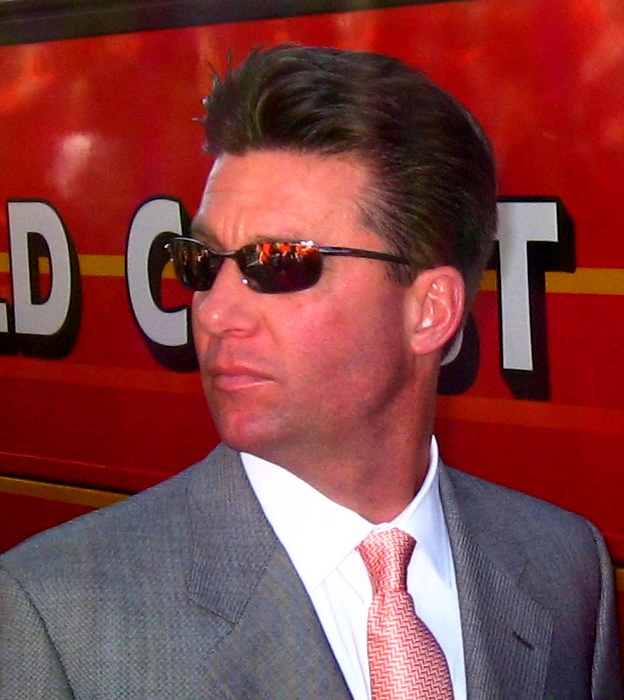
Mike Gundy served as the head coach for 21 seasons.

The Oklahoma State Cowboys football program is a college football team that represents Oklahoma State University–Stillwater. The team has had 23 head coaches since organized football began in 1901 with the nickname Aggies. The team played without a head coach until 1905. The university, then known as Oklahoma Agricultural and Mechanical College, was renamed Oklahoma State University in 1957 and its nickname was changed to Cowboys. The Cowboys have played in more than 1,000 games during their 122 seasons. In those seasons, eight coaches have led the Cowboys to postseason bowl games: Jim Lookabaugh, Cliff Speegle, Jim Stanley, Jimmy Johnson, Pat Jones, Bob Simmons, Les Miles and Mike Gundy. Six coaches have won conference championships with the Cowboys: John Maulbetsch, Lynn Waldorf, Lookabaugh, Jennings B. Whitworth, Stanley, and Gundy. Lookabaugh also won a national championship with the Cowboys.

Gundy is the all-time leader in games coached (260), wins (170) and years coached (21), while Waldorf is the all-time leader in winning percentage (.735). Theodore Cox finished his career with a .250 winning percentage, the worst in team history. Of the 23 Cowboy coaches, Maulbetsch, Waldorf, Exendine, and Johnson have been inducted in the College Football Hall of Fame. Three coaches are also graduates of the university: Lookabaugh, Floyd Gass, and Gundy. The first coach was F. A. McCoy, who coached only one season, in 1905. Offensive coordinator Doug Meacham will server as interim head coach for the remainder of season following Gundy's firing on September 23, 2025.

== Key ==
General
#	Number of coaches (Note: A running total of the number of coaches of the Oklahoma State Cowboys. Thus, any coach who has two or more separate terms as head coach is counted only once.)
CCs	Conference championships (Note: Oklahoma State did not join a conference until 1915.)
NCs	National championships
†	Elected to the College Football Hall of Fame

Overall games
GC	Games coached
OW	Wins
OL	Losses
OT	Ties (Note: Overtime rules in college football were introduced in 1996, making ties impossible in the period since.)
O%	Winning percentage (Note: When computing the win–loss percentage, a tie counts as half a win and half a loss.)

Conference games
CW	Wins
CL	Losses
CT	Ties
C%	Winning percentage

Postseason games
PW	Wins
PL	Losses
PT	Ties

== Head coaches ==
Statistics correct as of the end of the 2025 NCAA Division I FBS football season

#	Picture	Name	Term	GC	OW	OL	OT	O%	CW	CL	CT	C%	PW	PL	PT	CCs	NCs	National awards
1		F. A. McCoy	1905	7	1	4	2	.286	—	—	—	—	—	—	—	—		—
2		Boyd Hill	1906–1907	15	2	9	4	.267	—	—	—	—	—	—	—	—		—
3		Ed Parry	1908	8	4	4	0	.500	—	—	—	—	—	—	—	—	—	—
4		Paul J. Davis	1909–1914	45	28	16	1	.633	—	—	—	—	—	—	—	—	—	—
5		John G. Griffith	1915–1916	18	8	9	1	.472	0	6	0	.000	—	—	—	—	—	—
6		Earl A. Pritchard	1917–1918	15	8	7	0	.533	1	4	0	0.200	—	—	—	—	—	—
7		Jim Pixlee	1919–1920	16	3	10	3	.281	0	5	0	.000	—	—	—	—	—	—
8		John Maulbetsch^{†}	1921–1928	70	27	37	6	.429	10	13	3	0.442	—	—	—	1	—	—
9		Pappy Waldorf^{†}	1929–1933	51	34	10	7	.735	9	1	0	0.900	—	—	—	3	—	—
10		Albert Exendine^{†}	1934–1935	20	7	12	1	.375	1	4	0	0.200	—	—	—	—	—	—
11		Ted Cox	1936–1938	30	7	23	0	.233	3	8	0	0.273	—	—	—	—	—	—
12		Jim Lookabaugh	1939–1949	105	58	41	6	.581	19	10	1	0.650	2	1	0	3	1–1945	—
13		Jennings B. Whitworth	1950–1954	51	22	27	2	.451	11	9	1	0.548	—	—	—	1	—	—
14		Cliff Speegle	1955–1962	81	36	42	3	.463	9	19	1	0.328	1	0	0	—	—	—
15		Phil Cutchin	1963–1968	59	19	38	2	.339	14	26	1	0.354	—	—	—	—	—	—
16		Floyd Gass	1969–1971	32	13	18	1	.422	7	14	0	0.333	—	—	—	—	—	1969 Big 8 Coach of the Year
17		Dave Smith	1972	11	7	4	0	.636	4	3	0	0.571	—	—	—	—	—	—
18		Jim Stanley	1973–1978	68	35	31	2	.529	19	21	2	0.476	1	1	0	1	—	—
19		Jimmy Johnson^{†}	1979–1983	57	29	25	3	.535	18	15	2	0.543	1	1	0	—		—
20		Pat Jones	1984–1994	125	62	60	3	.508	30	44	3	0.409	3	1	0	—	—	—
21		Bob Simmons	1995–2000	68	30	38	0	.441	16	31	0	0.340	0	1	0	—	—	Big 12 Coach of the Year (1997)
22		Les Miles	2001–2004	49	28	21	—	.571	16	16	—	0.500	1	2	—	—	—	—
23		Mike Gundy	2005–2025	260	170	90	—	.654	102	72	—	0.586	12	6	—	1	—	Big 12 Coach of the Year (2010, 2021, 2023) Paul "Bear" Bryant Award (2011) Eddie Robinson Coach of the Year Award (2011)
24		Doug Meacham	2025	9	0	9	—	.000	0	9	—	.000	0	0	—	0	—	
