= 1970 Kansas State Wildcats football team =

American college football season

1970 Kansas State Wildcats football
- Conference: Big Eight Conference
- Record: 6–5 (5–2 Big 8)
- Head coach: Vince Gibson (4th season)
- Home stadium: KSU Stadium

1970 Big Eight Conference football standings
	Conf.					Overall
Team	W		L		T	W		L		T
No. 1 Nebraska $	7	–	0	–	0	11	–	0	–	1
No. 20 Oklahoma	5	–	2	–	0	7	–	4	–	1
Kansas State	5	–	2	–	0	6	–	5	–	0
Missouri	3	–	4	–	0	5	–	6	–	0
Colorado	3	–	4	–	0	6	–	5	–	0
Kansas	2	–	5	–	0	5	–	6	–	0
Oklahoma State	2	–	5	–	0	4	–	7	–	0
Iowa State	1	–	6	–	0	5	–	6	–	0
$ – Conference champion; Rankings from AP Poll

The 1970 Kansas State Wildcats football team represented Kansas State University in the 1970 NCAA University Division football season. The team's head football coach was Vince Gibson. The Wildcats played their home games in KSU Stadium.

Senior quarterback Lynn Dickey led the team to a third straight season as the top-rated passing offense in the Big Eight Conference. Kansas State also led the conference in total defense, and posted its first win against a top-ten team, beating #8 Colorado. The Wildcats went into the final conference game of the season against Nebraska ranked #20 and playing for the Big Eight championship. The #4-ranked Cornhuskers throttled Kansas State 51–13 in the game. Kansas State did not return to the national rankings again until the 1993 season.

The team finished with a winning record in conference play for the first time since 1953. And their first winning season in general since 1954. After the season Gibson was named coach of the year by the Big Eight.

== Schedule ==
Date	Time	Opponent	Rank	Site	Result	Attendance	Source
September 12		Utah State*	No. 14	KSU Stadium; Manhattan, KS	W 37–0	35,000	
September 19		at Kentucky*	No. 13	McLean Stadium; Lexington, KY	L 3–16	33,500	
September 26		at Arizona State*		Sun Devil Stadium; Tempe, AZ	L 13–35	50,255	
October 3		No. 8 Colorado		KSU Stadium; Manhattan, KS (rivalry)	W 21–20	40,200	
October 10		Kansas		KSU Stadium; Manhattan, KS (rivalry)	L 15–21	42,000	
October 17	1:30 p.m.	at Iowa State		Clyde Williams Field; Ames, IA (rivalry)	W 17–0	28,000	
October 24		at Oklahoma		Oklahoma Memorial Stadium; Norman, OK	W 19–14	60,800	
October 31		No. 17 Missouri		KSU Stadium; Manhattan, KS	W 17–13	42,000	
November 7		Oklahoma State^{†}		KSU Stadium; Manhattan, KS	W 28–15	38,300	
November 14		at No. 4 Nebraska	No. 20	Memorial Stadium; Lincoln, NE (rivalry)	L 13–51	67,894	
November 21		at Florida State*		Doak Campbell Stadium; Tallahassee, FL	L 7–31	23,448	
*Non-conference game; ^{†}Homecoming; Rankings from AP Poll released prior to the game; All times are in Central time

== Roster ==
1970 Kansas State Wildcats football team roster
Players
Coaches
Offense

Pos.	#	Name	Class
QB	11	Lynn Dickey	Sr
RB	23	Mike Montgomery	Sr

Defense

Pos.	#	Name	Class
DB	20	Ron Dickerson	Jr
DB	26	Clarence Scott	Sr
DE	70	Ron Yankowski	Sr

Special teams

Pos.	#	Name	Class

Head coach

- Vince Gibson

Coordinators/assistant coaches

- Bobby Jackson – Quarterbacks/running backs
- Don Powell – Offensive line
- Jerry Elliott – Defensive line
- Bob Frazier – Defensive ends
- Sam Robertson – Linebackers
- Jesse Branch – Defensive backs
- Gene McDowell – Assistant

Legend

- (C) Team captain
- (S) Suspended
- (I) Ineligible
- Injured
- Redshirt
