= 1970 Kansas Jayhawks football team =

American college football season

1970 Kansas Jayhawks football
- Conference: Big Eight Conference
- Record: 5–6 (2–5 Big 8)
- Head coach: Pepper Rodgers (4th season)
- Captain: Larry Brown
- Home stadium: Memorial Stadium

1970 Big Eight Conference football standings
	Conf.					Overall
Team	W		L		T	W		L		T
No. 1 Nebraska $	7	–	0	–	0	11	–	0	–	1
No. 20 Oklahoma	5	–	2	–	0	7	–	4	–	1
Kansas State	5	–	2	–	0	6	–	5	–	0
Missouri	3	–	4	–	0	5	–	6	–	0
Colorado	3	–	4	–	0	6	–	5	–	0
Kansas	2	–	5	–	0	5	–	6	–	0
Oklahoma State	2	–	5	–	0	4	–	7	–	0
Iowa State	1	–	6	–	0	5	–	6	–	0
$ – Conference champion; Rankings from AP Poll

The 1970 Kansas Jayhawks football team represented the University of Kansas in the Big Eight Conference during the 1970 NCAA University Division football season. In their fourth and final season under head coach Pepper Rodgers, the Jayhawks compiled a 5–6 record (2–5 against conference opponents), tied for sixth place in the Big Eight Conference, and were outscored by their opponents by a combined total of 277 to 270. They played their home games at Memorial Stadium in Lawrence, Kansas, where artificial turf was installed.

The team's statistical leaders included Dan Heck with 1,169 passing yards, John Riggins with 1,131 rushing yards and Ron Jessie with 308 receiving yards. Larry Brown was the team captain.

== Schedule ==
Date	Time	Opponent	Site	Result	Attendance	Source
September 12		Washington State*	Memorial Stadium; Lawrence, KS	W 48–31	34,000	
September 19		Texas Tech*	Memorial Stadium; Lawrence, KS	L 0–23	36,355–38,700	
September 26		at Syracuse*	Archbold Stadium; Syracuse, NY	W 31–14	25,000	
October 3		New Mexico*	Memorial Stadium; Lawrence, KS	W 49–23	41,000	
October 10		at Kansas State	KSU Stadium; Manhattan, KS (rivalry)	W 21–15	42,000	
October 17		No. 5 Nebraska	Memorial Stadium; Lawrence, KS (rivalry)	L 20–41	50,200	
October 24	1:30 p.m.	Iowa State^{†}	Memorial Stadium; Lawrence, KS	W 24–10	37,750	
October 31		at Oklahoma State	Lewis Field; Stillwater, OK	L 7–19	35,000	
November 7		at Colorado	Folsom Field; Boulder, CO	L 29–45	37,250	
November 14		Oklahoma	Memorial Stadium; Lawrence, KS	L 24–28	38,200	
November 21		at Missouri	Memorial Stadium; Columbia, MO (Border War)	L 17–28	58,500	
*Non-conference game; ^{†}Homecoming; Rankings from AP Poll released prior to the game; All times are in Central time

== Roster ==
1970 Kansas Jayhawks football team roster
Players
Coaches
Offense

Pos.	#	Name	Class
OT	70	Larry Brown	Sr
WR	23	Ron Jessie	Sr
OT	78	Steve Lawson	Sr
RB	32	John Riggins	Sr

Defense

Pos.	#	Name	Class

Special teams

Pos.	#	Name	Class

Head coach

- Pepper Rodgers

Coordinators/assistant coaches

Legend

- (C) Team captain
- (S) Suspended
- (I) Ineligible
- Injured
- Redshirt

== 1971 NFL draft ==
Player	Position	Round	Pick	NFL club
John Riggins	Fullback	1	6	New York Jets
Steve Lawson	Guard	2	41	Cincinnati Bengals
Larry Brown	Tight end	5	106	Pittsburgh Steelers
Ron Jessie	Wide receiver	8	206	Dallas Cowboys
