= 1971 Kansas Jayhawks football team =

American college football season

1971 Kansas Jayhawks football
- Conference: Big Eight Conference
- Record: 4–7 (2–5 Big 8)
- Head coach: Don Fambrough (1st season)
- Captains: Kenny Page; Bob Childs
- Home stadium: Memorial Stadium

1971 Big Eight Conference football standings
	Conf.					Overall
Team	W		L		T	W		L		T
No. 1 Nebraska $	7	–	0	–	0	13	–	0	–	0
No. 2 Oklahoma	6	–	1	–	0	11	–	1	–	0
No. 3 Colorado	5	–	2	–	0	10	–	2	–	0
Iowa State	4	–	3	–	0	8	–	4	–	0
Kansas State	2	–	5	–	0	5	–	6	–	0
Oklahoma State	2	–	5	–	0	4	–	6	–	1
Kansas	2	–	5	–	0	4	–	7	–	0
Missouri	0	–	7	–	0	1	–	10	–	0
$ – Conference champion; Rankings from AP Poll

The 1971 Kansas Jayhawks football team represented the University of Kansas in the Big Eight Conference during the 1971 NCAA University Division football season. In their first season under head coach Don Fambrough, the Jayhawks compiled a 4–7 record (2–5 against conference opponents), tied for fifth place in the conference, and were outscored by opponents by a combined total of 286 to 187. They played their home games at Memorial Stadium in Lawrence, Kansas.

The team's statistical leaders included David Jaynes with 748 passing yards, Delvin Williams with 509 rushing yards and John Schroll with 491 receiving yards. Kenny Page and Bob Childs were the team captains.

== Schedule ==
Date	Opponent	Site	Result	Attendance	Source
September 11	Washington State*	Memorial Stadium; Lawrence, KS	W 34–0	37,750	
September 18	Baylor*	Memorial Stadium; Lawrence, KS	W 22–0	36,362	
September 25	at Florida State*	Doak Campbell Stadium; Tallahassee, FL	L 7–30	34,784	
October 2	at Minnesota*	Memorial Stadium; Minneapolis, MN	L 20–38	30,090	
October 9	Kansas State^{†}	Memorial Stadium; Lawrence, KS (rivalry)	W 39–13	51,617	
October 16	at No. 1 Nebraska	Memorial Stadium; Lincoln, NE (rivalry)	L 0–55	68,331	
October 23	at Iowa State	Clyde Williams Field; Ames, IA	L 24–40	32,000	
October 30	Oklahoma State	Memorial Stadium; Lawrence, KS	L 10–17	25,000	
November 6	No. 13 Colorado	Memorial Stadium; Lawrence, KS	L 14–35	35,500	
November 13	at No. 2 Oklahoma	Oklahoma Memorial Stadium; Norman, OK	L 10–56	54,400	
November 20	Missouri	Memorial Stadium; Lawrence, KS (Border War)	W 7–2	46,750	
*Non-conference game; ^{†}Homecoming; Rankings from AP Poll released prior to the game
