= 1970 Oklahoma State Cowboys football team =

American college football season

1970 Oklahoma State Cowboys football
- Conference: Big Eight Conference
- Record: 4–7 (2–5 Big 8)
- Head coach: Floyd Gass (2nd season)
- Home stadium: Lewis Field

1970 Big Eight Conference football standings
	Conf.					Overall
Team	W		L		T	W		L		T
No. 1 Nebraska $	7	–	0	–	0	11	–	0	–	1
No. 20 Oklahoma	5	–	2	–	0	7	–	4	–	1
Kansas State	5	–	2	–	0	6	–	5	–	0
Missouri	3	–	4	–	0	5	–	6	–	0
Colorado	3	–	4	–	0	6	–	5	–	0
Kansas	2	–	5	–	0	5	–	6	–	0
Oklahoma State	2	–	5	–	0	4	–	7	–	0
Iowa State	1	–	6	–	0	5	–	6	–	0
$ – Conference champion; Rankings from AP Poll

The 1970 Oklahoma State Cowboys football team represented Oklahoma State University in the Big Eight Conference during the 1970 NCAA University Division football season. In their second season under head coach Floyd Gass, the Cowboys compiled a 4–7 record (2–5 against conference opponents), tied for sixth place in the conference, and were outscored by opponents by a combined total of 337 to 215.

The team's statistical leaders included Bobby Cole with 685 rushing yards, Tony Pounds with 1,871 passing yards, and Hermann Eben with 937 receiving yards and 42 points scored.

The team played its home games at Lewis Field in Stillwater, Oklahoma.

== Schedule ==
Date	Time	Opponent	Site	Result	Attendance	Source
September 12		at Mississippi State*	Mississippi Veterans Memorial Stadium; Jackson, MS	L 13–14	34,000	
September 19		at No. 11 Arkansas*	War Memorial Stadium; Little Rock, AR	L 7–23	53,000	
September 26		No. 11 Houston*	Lewis Field; Stillwater, OK	W 26–17	26,000	
October 3		No. 20 Missouri	Lewis Field; Stillwater, OK	L 20–40	33,000	
October 10		TCU*	Lewis Field; Stillwater, OK	W 34–20	24,500	
October 24		at No. 4 Nebraska	Memorial Stadium; Lincoln, NE	L 31–65	67,822	
October 31		Kansas^{†}	Lewis Field; Stillwater, OK	W 19–7	35,000	
November 7		at Kansas State	KSU Stadium; Manhattan, KS	L 15–28	38,300	
November 14		Colorado	Lewis Field; Stillwater, OK	L 6–30	18,000	
November 21	1:30 p.m.	Iowa State	Lewis Field; Stillwater, OK	W 36–27	19,500	
November 28		at Oklahoma	Oklahoma Memorial Stadium; Norman, OK (Bedlam Series)	L 6–66	60,300	
*Non-conference game; ^{†}Homecoming; Rankings from AP Poll released prior to the game; All times are in Central time

== After the season ==
The 1971 NFL draft was held on January 28–29, 1971. The following Cowboy was selected.

Round	Pick	Player	Position	NFL club
17	428	Hermann Eben	Wide receiver	New Orleans Saints
