= 1971 Kansas State Wildcats football team =

American college football season

1971 Kansas State Wildcats football
- Conference: Big Eight Conference
- Record: 5–6 (2–5 Big 8)
- Head coach: Vince Gibson (5th season)
- Home stadium: KSU Stadium

1971 Big Eight Conference football standings
	Conf.					Overall
Team	W		L		T	W		L		T
No. 1 Nebraska $	7	–	0	–	0	13	–	0	–	0
No. 2 Oklahoma	6	–	1	–	0	11	–	1	–	0
No. 3 Colorado	5	–	2	–	0	10	–	2	–	0
Iowa State	4	–	3	–	0	8	–	4	–	0
Kansas State	2	–	5	–	0	5	–	6	–	0
Oklahoma State	2	–	5	–	0	4	–	6	–	1
Kansas	2	–	5	–	0	4	–	7	–	0
Missouri	0	–	7	–	0	1	–	10	–	0
$ – Conference champion; Rankings from AP Poll

The 1971 Kansas State Wildcats football team represented Kansas State University in the 1971 NCAA University Division football season. The team's head football coach was Vince Gibson. The Wildcats played their home games in KSU Stadium. 1971 saw the wildcats finish with a record of 5–6, and a 2–5 record in Big Eight Conference play.

== Schedule ==
Date	Opponent	Site	Result	Attendance	Source
September 11	Utah State*	KSU Stadium; Manhattan, KS	L 7–10	30,000	
September 18	at Tulsa*	Skelly Stadium; Tulsa, OK	W 19–10	23,500	
September 25	BYU*	KSU Stadium; Manhattan, KS	W 23–7	37,500	
October 2	at No. 6 Colorado	Folsom Field; Boulder, CO (rivalry)	L 21–31	47,740	
October 9	at Kansas	Memorial Stadium; Lawrence, KS (rivalry)	L 13–39	51,617	
October 16	Iowa State^{†}	KSU Stadium; Manhattan, KS (rivalry)	L 0–24	32,000	
October 23	No. 2 Oklahoma	KSU Stadium; Manhattan, KS	L 28–75	40,000	
October 30	at Missouri	Memorial Stadium; Columbia, MO	W 28–12	52,498	
November 6	at Oklahoma State	Lewis Field; Stillwater, OK	W 35–23	35,500	
November 13	No. 1 Nebraska	KSU Stadium; Manhattan, KS (rivalry)	L 17–44	42,300	
November 20	Memphis State*	Memphis Memorial Stadium; Memphis, TN	W 28–21	17,234	
*Non-conference game; ^{†}Homecoming; Rankings from AP Poll released prior to the game

== Roster ==
1971 Kansas State Wildcats football team roster
Players
Coaches
Offense

Pos.	#	Name	Class
QB	10	Dennis Morrison	Jr
G	74	John Wells	So

Defense

Pos.	#	Name	Class
DB	19	Ron Coppenbarger	Jr
DE	86	John O'Neill	Jr

Special teams

Pos.	#	Name	Class

Head coach

- Vince Gibson

Coordinators/assistant coaches

Legend

- (C) Team captain
- (S) Suspended
- (I) Ineligible
- Injured
- Redshirt
