= 1971 Oklahoma Sooners football team =

American college football season

1971 Oklahoma Sooners football
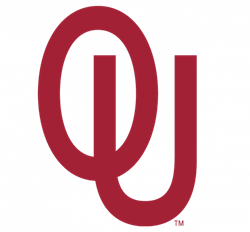

Sugar Bowl champion

Sugar Bowl, W 40–22 vs. Auburn
- Conference: Big Eight Conference

Ranking
- Coaches: No. 3
- AP: No. 2
- Record: 11–1 (6–1 Big 8)
- Head coach: Chuck Fairbanks (5th season)
- Offensive coordinator: Barry Switzer (6th season)
- Offensive scheme: Wishbone
- Defensive coordinator: Larry Lacewell (2nd season)
- Base defense: 4–3
- Captains: Steve Aycock; Glenn King; Jack Mildren
- Home stadium: Oklahoma Memorial Stadium

1971 Big Eight Conference football standings
	Conf.					Overall
Team	W		L		T	W		L		T
No. 1 Nebraska $	7	–	0	–	0	13	–	0	–	0
No. 2 Oklahoma	6	–	1	–	0	11	–	1	–	0
No. 3 Colorado	5	–	2	–	0	10	–	2	–	0
Iowa State	4	–	3	–	0	8	–	4	–	0
Kansas State	2	–	5	–	0	5	–	6	–	0
Oklahoma State	2	–	5	–	0	4	–	6	–	1
Kansas	2	–	5	–	0	4	–	7	–	0
Missouri	0	–	7	–	0	1	–	10	–	0
$ – Conference champion; Rankings from AP Poll

The 1971 Oklahoma Sooners football team represented the University of Oklahoma in the 1971 NCAA University Division football season. Oklahoma was a member of the Big Eight Conference and played its home games in Oklahoma Memorial Stadium where it has played its home games since 1923. The team posted an 11–1 and 6–1 conference record under head coach Chuck Fairbanks. The Sooners finished the season ranked #2, losing only once, 35–31 to eventual national champion Nebraska in the 1971 Nebraska vs. Oklahoma football game, which has become known as Game of the Century.

In 1971, offensive coordinator Barry Switzer perfected the wishbone offense as it led the nation in both scoring (45 points average) and total yards (563 total yards average), and set an NCAA record by averaging over 472.4 (5196 in 11 games) rushing yards in a season. The team holds the current school record with 7.07 yards per rushing attempt and 7.6 yards per play as well as the records for 469.6 rushing yards (5635 in 12 games counting bowl game) and 566.83 yards of total offense per game. The team also holds the single-season rushing touchdowns record of 62 and rushing touchdowns per game record of 5.17. The team's records of 711 single-game rushing yards and 785 total yards stood for nine seasons. Jack Mildren's single-season record for yards rushing by a quarterback of 1140 would be broken three seasons later by Freddie Solomon.

Greg Pruitt set the current national single-season record with 8.98 yards per attempt, the school's single-game records of 294 rushing yards and 374 all-purpose yards. Meanwhile, Jon Harrison set the single-season and career yards per reception with 29.1 and 27.0. His 2066 single-season all-purpose yards record stood until Quentin Griffin broke it in 2002. Joe Wylie's kickoff return average record of 28.5 stood for 27 years.

The team was led by three All-Americans: Pruitt, Tom Brahaney and Jack Mildren. The team won its first nine games on a schedule that included five ranked opponents (In order, #17 USC, #3 Texas, #6 Colorado, #1 Nebraska and #5 Auburn). All five of these opponents finished the season ranked. The only loss was to Nebraska. They played Auburn in the Sugar Bowl and won 40–22.

The top three teams in the final AP poll for the 1971 season were from the Big Eight: Nebraska, Oklahoma, and Colorado. The top two teams had never been from the same conference, and this year had three.

Pruitt led the team in rushing with 1760 yards, Mildren led the team in passing yards for the third straight season with 889 yards and also in scoring with 120 points, Harrison led the team in receiving with 494 yards, Mark Driscoll led the team in tackles with 134, and John Shelly led the team in interceptions with 5.

== Schedule ==
Date	Opponent	Rank	Site	TV	Result	Attendance	Source
September 18	SMU*	No. 10	Oklahoma Memorial Stadium; Norman, OK		W 30–0	48,500	
September 25	at Pittsburgh*	No. 11	Pitt Stadium; Pittsburgh, PA		W 55–29	35,030	
October 2	No. 17 USC*	No. 8	Oklahoma Memorial Stadium; Norman, OK		W 33–20	61,826	
October 9	vs. No. 3 Texas*	No. 8	Cotton Bowl; Dallas, TX (Red River Shootout)	ABC	W 48–27	73,580	
October 16	No. 6 Colorado^{†}	No. 2	Oklahoma Memorial Stadium; Norman, OK		W 45–17	61,826	
October 23	at Kansas State	No. 2	KSU Stadium; Manhattan, KS		W 75–28	40,000	
October 30	Iowa State	No. 2	Oklahoma Memorial Stadium; Norman, OK		W 43–12	60,500	
November 6	at Missouri	No. 2	Memorial Stadium; Columbia, MO (rivalry)		W 20–3	53,011	
November 13	Kansas	No. 2	Oklahoma Memorial Stadium; Norman, OK	ABC	W 56–10	54,400	
November 25	No. 1 Nebraska	No. 2	Oklahoma Memorial Stadium; Norman, OK (rivalry)	ABC	L 31–35	61,826	
December 4	at Oklahoma State	No. 3	Lewis Field; Stillwater, OK (Bedlam Series)		W 58–14	37,500	
January 1, 1972	vs. No. 5 Auburn*	No. 3	Tulane Stadium; New Orleans, LA (Sugar Bowl)	ABC	W 40–22	84,031	
*Non-conference game; ^{†}Homecoming; Rankings from AP Poll released prior to the game

== Game summaries ==
=== SMU ===
Team	1	2	3	4	Total
SMU	0	0	0	0	0
• Oklahoma	3	17	7	3	30

- Date: September 18
- Location: Oklahoma Memorial Stadium
- Game attendance: 53,545

=== Pittsburgh ===
Team	1	2	3	4	Total
• Oklahoma	21	21	6	7	55
Pittsburgh	11	6	0	12	29

- Date: September 25
- Location: Pitt Stadium
- Game attendance: 34,916

=== USC ===
Team	1	2	3	4	Total
USC	7	7	0	6	20
• Oklahoma	13	6	14	0	33

- Date: October 2
- Location: Oklahoma Memorial Stadium
- Game attendance: 62,351

=== Texas ===
#8 Oklahoma Sooners vs. #3 Texas Longhorns

Team	1	2	3	4	Total
• #8 Oklahoma	14	17	7	10	48
#3 Texas	14	7	6	0	27

- Date: October 9
- Location: Cotton Bowl, Dallas
- Game weather: Sunny

Scoring summary
1	10:29	TEX	Donnie Wigginton 5-yard run (Steve Valek kick)	TEX 7-0
1	7:59	OU	Greg Pruitt 1-yard run (John Carroll kick)	Tied 7-7
1	5:04	TEX	Donnie Wigginton 44-yard run (Steve Valek kick)	TEX 14-7
1	2:04	OU	Roy Bell 3-yard run (John Carroll kick)	Tied 14-14
2	10:33	OU	Greg Pruitt 4-yard run (John Carroll kick)	OU 21-14
2	9:09	OU	Gregg Pruitt 20-yard run (John Carroll kick)	OU 28-14
2	4:53	TEX	Jim Bertelsen 3-yard run (Steve Valek kick)	OU 28-21
2	0:01	OU	John Carroll 26-yard field goal	OU 31-21
3	7:17	OU	Jack Mildren 7-yard run (John Carroll kick)	OU 38-21
3	2:16	TEX	Jim Bertelsen 15-yard run (kick failed)	OU 38-27
4	3:29	OU	John Carroll 27-yard field goal	OU 41-27
4	2:10	OU	Jack Mildren 1-yard run (John Carroll kick)	OU 48-27

=== Colorado ===
#6 Colorado Buffaloes at #2 Oklahoma Sooners

Team	1	2	3	4	Total
#6 Colorado	0	0	17	0	17
• #2 Oklahoma	14	10	7	14	45

- Date: October 16
- Location: Oklahoma Memorial Stadium, Norman, Oklahoma
- Game attendance: 61,826

Scoring summary
1	OU	Pruitt 66-yard run (Carroll kick)	OU 7-0
1	OU	Harrison 54-yard pass from Mildren (Carroll kick)	OU 14-0
2	OU	Carroll 36-yard field goal	OU 17-0
2	OU	Mildren 3-yard run (Carroll kick)	OU 24-0
3	COL	Nichols 64-yard pass from Johnson (Dean kick)	OU 24-7
3	OU	Pruitt 14-yard run (Carroll kick)	OU 31-7
3	COL	Davis 16-yard run (Dean kick)	OU 31-14
3	COL	Dean 32-yard field goal	OU 31-17
4	OU	Wylie 68-yard pass from Mildren (Carroll kick)	OU 38-17
4	OU	Bell 3-yard run (Carroll kick)	OU 45-17

=== Kansas State ===
Team	1	2	3	4	Total
• Oklahoma	14	27	13	21	75
Kansas St	7	7	7	7	28

- Date: October 23
- Location: KSU Stadium, Manhattan, Kansas
- Game attendance: 40,000

Scoring summary
1	KSU	Butler 2 yard run (Goerger kick)	Kansas St 7–0
1	OKLA	Mildren 1 yard run (kick failed)	Kansas St 7–6
1	OKLA	Pruitt 15 yard run (Chandler pass from Mildren)	Oklahoma 14–7
2	OKLA	Bell 24 yard run (Carroll kick)	Oklahoma 21–7
2	KSU	Butler 1 yard run (Goerger kick)	Oklahoma 21–14
2	OKLA	Pruitt 38 yard run (Carroll kick)	Oklahoma 28–14
2	OKLA	Pruitt 15 yard run (Carroll kick)	Oklahoma 35–14
2	OKLA	Bell 5 yard run (kick failed)	Oklahoma 41–14
3	OKLA	Bell 6 yard run (Carroll kick)	Oklahoma 48–14
3	KSU	Butler 1 yard run (Goerger kick)	Oklahoma 48–21
3	OKLA	Mildren 42 yard run (kick failed)	Oklahoma 54–21
4	OKLA	Chandler 15 yard pass from Mildren (Carroll kick)	Oklahoma 61–21
4	KSU	Butler 1 yard run (Goerger kick)	Oklahoma 61–28
4	OKLA	Bell 11 yard run (Carroll kick)	Oklahoma 68–28
4	OKLA	Marshall 6 yard run (Carroll kick)	Oklahoma 75–28

=== Iowa State ===
Team	1	2	3	4	Total
Iowa St	6	0	6	0	12
• Oklahoma	17	12	7	7	43

- Date: October 30
- Location: Oklahoma Memorial Stadium
- Game attendance: 60,477

=== Missouri ===
Team	1	2	3	4	Total
• Oklahoma	6	14	0	0	20
Missouri	0	3	0	0	3

- Date: November 6
- Location: Faurot Field
- Game attendance: 55,098

=== Kansas ===
Team	1	2	3	4	Total
Kansas	0	0	0	10	10
• Oklahoma	14	35	7	0	56

- Date: November 13
- Location: Oklahoma Memorial Stadium

=== Nebraska ===
#1 Nebraska at #2 Oklahoma

Team	1	2	3	4	Total
• #1 Nebraska	7	7	14	7	35
#2 Oklahoma	3	14	7	7	31

- Date: 1971-11-25
- Location: Oklahoma Memorial Stadium, Norman, Oklahoma
- Game start: 1:50 pm CST
- Game attendance: 61,826
- Referee: Vance Carlson
- TV announcers (ABC): Chris Schenkel, Bud Wilkinson,
  and Bill Flemming (sideline)

Oklahoma and Nebraska battled back and forth in the Game of the Century in front of a sold-out crowd in Norman and over 55 million viewers on ABC on Thanksgiving Day. Nebraska struck first with a 72-yard Johnny Rodgers punt return, but Oklahoma pulled ahead by 3 by halftime. The Cornhuskers came back strong in the third quarter with two more touchdowns, but the Sooners responded with two of their own to retake the lead with only 7:10 remaining. Down by 3 points, the Huskers went on a final drive and with only 1:38 remaining, Jeff Kinney scored his fourth touchdown of the day for the lead and the win.

=== Oklahoma State ===
Frustrated from their painful loss to Nebraska, the Sooners showed their in-state archrival no mercy in the final game for Cowboys coach Floyd Gass, as well as the last game at Lewis Field (now Boone Pickens Stadium) before a massive renovation which expanded the stadium's capacity, removed the cinder track around the field, and replaced the grass surface with artificial turf.

#3 Oklahoma Sooners at Oklahoma State Cowboys

Team	1	2	3	4	Total
• #3 Oklahoma	17	20	7	14	58
Oklahoma State	0	7	0	7	14

- Date: December 4
- Location: Lewis Field, Stillwater, Oklahoma
- Game attendance: 37,500

Scoring summary
1	OU	Carroll 26-yard field goal	OU 3-0
1	OU	Mildren 4-yard run (Carroll kick)	OU 10-0
1	OU	Harrison 77-yard run (Carroll kick)	OU 17-0
2	OU	Mildren 1-yard run (Carroll kick)	OU 24-0
2	OU	Pruitt 1-yard run (kick failed)	OU 30-0
2	OSU	Garrett 38-yard run (Pruss kick)	OU 30-7
2	OU	Chandler 18-yard pass from Mildren (Carroll kick)	OU 37-7
3	OU	Pruitt 7-yard run (Carroll kick)	OU 44-7
4	OSU	Graham 7-yard pass from Pounds (Pruss kick)	OU 44-14
4	OU	Bell 4-yard run (Carroll kick)	OU 51-14
4	OU	Dodd 5-yard run (Carroll kick)	OU 58-14

=== Sugar Bowl ===
Team	1	2	3	4	Total
• Oklahoma	19	12	3	6	40
Auburn	0	0	7	15	22

- Date: January 1
- Location: Tulane Stadium
- Game start: 11:05 a.m. CST
- Game attendance: 84,031
- Referee: James M. Artley
- TV announcers (ABC): Chris Schenkel, Bud Wilkinson
- Passing: AUB Sullivan 20/44, 250 Yds, TD, INT, OU Mildren 1/4, 11 Yds
- Rushing: AUB Unger 6 Rush, 38 Yds, 2 TD, OU Mildren 30 Rush, 149 Yds, 3 TD
- Receiving: AUB Beasley 6 Rec, 117 Yds, OU Chandler 1 Rec, 11 Yds
- OU Crosswhite 4 yd run (kick failed)
- OU Mildren 5 yd run (Carroll kick)
- OU Mildren 4 yd run (kick failed)
- OU Mildren 7 yd run (kick failed)
- OU Wylie 71 yd punt return (kick failed)
- AUB Unger 1 yd run (Jett kick)
- OU Caroll 53 yd FG
- AUB Unger 1 yd run (Jett kick)
- OU Pruitt 2 yd run (kick failed)
- AUB Cannon 11 yd pass from Sullivan (run good)

== Rankings ==
Ranking movements Legend: ██ Increase in ranking ██ Decrease in ranking ( ) = First-place votes
	Week														
Poll	Pre	1	2	3	4	5	6	7	8	9	10	11	12	13	Final
AP	10	10	11	8	8	2 (8)	2 (18)	2 (21)	2 (17)	2 (6)	2 (8)	2 (8)	3	3	2

== Roster ==
1971 Oklahoma Sooners football team roster
Players
Coaches
Offense

Pos.	#	Name	Class
G	63	Neil Acker	So
SE	6	Steve Allen	So
OT	65	Drake Andarakes	So
RB	35	Roy Bell	Sr
HB	20	Bob Berg	So
C	54	Tom Brahaney	Jr
C	56	Paul Bunge	So
HB	25	Grant Burget	So
HB	34	Dexter Bussey	So
SE	10	John Carroll	So
TE	82	Al Chandler	So
RB	17	Leon Crosswhite	Jr
C	50	Kyle Davis	So
C	53	Glenn Dewberry	Sr
FB	40	Steve Dodd	So
G	73	Darryl Emmert	Sr
OT	77	Eddie Foster	So
SE	80	Willie Franklin	Sr
QB	8	Rick Fulcher	Jr
TE	87	David Geren	Jr
HB	36	Pete Halfman	Sr
SE	12	Jon Harrison	Sr
TE	84	Ron Hull	So
OT	79	Robert Jensen	Jr
G	72	Ken Jones	Jr
OT	74	Phil Jordan	Jr
HB	24	Everett Marshall	Sr
OT	69	John McLaughlin	So
TE	85	Mike McLaughlin	So
QB	11	Jack Mildren (C)	Sr
G	64	Bill Orendorff	So
G	61	Jerry Perkey	So
RB	30	Greg Pruitt	Jr
TE	7	John Reddell	So
G	62	Sidney Riley	So
QB	15	Dave Robertson	Jr
G	78	Ron Stacy	Sr
QB	9	James Stokely	So
OT	67	Jim Taylor	So
OT	75	Jimmy Teston	So
G	83	Perry Thompson	So
OT	71	Nelson Todd	Sr
OT	60	Dean Unruh	Jr
FB	44	Ron Waters	So
FB	45	Tim Welch	So
OT	76	Brad White	So

Defense

Pos.	#	Name	Class
LB	43	Steve Aycock (C)	Sr
LB	51	Gary Baccus	Jr
DB	27	Gary Carter	Jr
DT	90	George Davis	So
DT	66	Lionell Day	Sr
DB	23	Max Dayton	Jr
DE	88	Bruce DeLoney	Sr
LB	59	Mark Driscoll	Sr
DB	4	Mike Dulan	So
LB	55	Gary Gibbs	So
DT	96	Ray Hamilton	Jr
LB	57	Mike Hawpe	Sr
LB	41	Wayne Hoffman	So
DE	95	Mike Hronopulos	So
LB	32	Ken Hulstein	So
DB	31	Vic Kearney	Jr
DB	21	Glenn King (C)	Sr
DE	99	Mark Lundquist	So
DT	86	Haynes McBride	So
LB	48	Richard Mildren	So
LB	49	Jon Milste	Jr
DT	97	Derland Moore	So
LB	58	Danny Mullen	Jr
DB	19	Geoffrey Nordgren	Sr
DB	18	Steve O'Shaughnessy	Sr
DT	89	A.G. Perryman	Jr
DB	28	Kenith Pope	So
DB	29	Clyde Powers	So
LB/DE	81	Al Qualls	Sr
LB	42	Gary Rhynes	So
DB	26	Larry Roach	Jr
DB	16	Dan Ruster	Jr
DT	70	Tommy Saunders	Jr
DE	98	Lucious Selmon	So
DB	33	John Shelley	Sr
DB	14	Steve Shotts	Jr
DB	38	Dewayne Smith	So
LB	46	Ricky Stokes	So
DE	92	Mike Struck	So
LB	47	Gary Weibert	So
DT	91	Chris West	So
DT	94	Joe Whitaker	So
DT	93	Dennis Woods	So
DB	37	Gary Young	So

Special teams

Pos.	#	Name	Class
K	5	Steve Caruthers	Sr
P	22	Joe Wylie	Jr

Head coach

- Chuck Fairbanks

Coordinators/assistant coaches

- Jim Dickey (DB)
- Galen Hall (WR)
- Warren Harper (LB)
- Gene Hochevar
- Jimmy Johnson (DL)
- Larry Lacewell (DC)
- Bill Michael (OL)
- Barry Switzer (OC)

Legend

- (C) Team captain
- (S) Suspended
- (I) Ineligible
- Injured
- Redshirt

Roster

=== Depth chart ===
Defense

FS
Larry Roach
⋅

LB	LB	LB
Albert Quails	Steve Aycock	Mark Driscoll
⋅	⋅	⋅

SS
John Shelley
⋅

CB
Kenith Pope
⋅

DE	DT	DT	DE
Raymond Hamilton	Lucious Selmon	Derland Moore	Lionell Day
⋅	⋅	⋅	⋅

CB
Steve O’Shaughnessy
⋅

Offense

WR
Jon Harrison
Willie Franklin

LT	LG	C	RG	RT
Dean Unruh	Darryl Emmert	Tom Brahaney	Ken Jones	Robert Jensen
⋅	⋅	⋅	⋅	⋅

TE
Al Chandler
⋅

QB
Jack Mildren
Dave Robertson

FB
Leon Crosswhite
Tim Welch

Special teams

RB
Greg Pruitt
⋅

RB
Roy Bell
Joe Wylie

== Awards and honors ==
- All-American: Greg Pruitt, Tom Brahaney and Jack Mildren
- Academic All-American: Mildren

== After the season ==
=== NFL draft ===
The following players were selected in the National Football League draft following the season.

Round	Pick	Player	Position	NFL team
2	46	Jack Mildren	Defensive back	Baltimore Colts
8	191	Al Qualls	Linebacker	Baltimore Colts
9	234	Roy Bell	Running back	Dallas Cowboys
17	417	John Shelley	Defensive back	Buffalo Bills
