= 1971 Iowa State Cyclones football team =

American college football season

1971 Iowa State Cyclones football

Sun Bowl, L 15–33 vs. LSU
- Conference: Big Eight Conference

Ranking
- Coaches: No. 17
- Record: 8–4 (4–3 Big 8)
- Head coach: Johnny Majors (4th season)
- Offensive coordinator: George Haffner (1st season)
- Defensive coordinator: Jackie Sherrill (2nd season)
- Captains: Dean Carlson; Ray Harm; Keith Schroeder
- Home stadium: Clyde Williams Field

1971 Big Eight Conference football standings
	Conf.					Overall
Team	W		L		T	W		L		T
No. 1 Nebraska $	7	–	0	–	0	13	–	0	–	0
No. 2 Oklahoma	6	–	1	–	0	11	–	1	–	0
No. 3 Colorado	5	–	2	–	0	10	–	2	–	0
Iowa State	4	–	3	–	0	8	–	4	–	0
Kansas State	2	–	5	–	0	5	–	6	–	0
Oklahoma State	2	–	5	–	0	4	–	6	–	1
Kansas	2	–	5	–	0	4	–	7	–	0
Missouri	0	–	7	–	0	1	–	10	–	0
$ – Conference champion; Rankings from AP Poll

The 1971 Iowa State Cyclones football team represented Iowa State University in the Big Eight Conference during the 1971 NCAA University Division football season. In their fourth year under head coach Johnny Majors, the Cyclones compiled an 8–4 record (4–3 against conference opponents), finished in fourth place in the conference, and outscored opponents by a combined total of 337 to 250. They played their home games at Clyde Williams Field in Ames, Iowa.

Dean Carlson, Ray Harm, and Keith Schroeder were the team captains.

== Schedule ==
Date	Time	Opponent	Site	TV	Result	Attendance	Source
September 18	1:30 pm	Idaho*	Clyde Williams Field; Ames, IA		W 24–7	25,000	
September 25	8:30 pm	at New Mexico*	University Stadium; Albuquerque, NM		W 44–20	27,231	
October 2	12:30 pm	at Kent State*	Memorial Stadium; Kent, OH		W 17–14	11,551	
October 9	1:30 pm	No. 5 Colorado	Clyde Williams Field; Ames, IA		L 14–24	32,000	
October 16	1:30 pm	at Kansas State	KSU Stadium; Manhattan, KS (rivalry)		W 24–0	32,000	
October 23	1:30 pm	Kansas^{†}	Clyde Williams Field; Ames, IA		W 40–24	32,000	
October 30	1:30 pm	at No. 2 Oklahoma	Oklahoma Memorial Stadium; Norman, OK		L 12–43	60,500	
November 6	1:30 pm	at No. 1 Nebraska	Memorial Stadium; Lincoln, NE (rivalry)		L 0–37	67,201	
November 13	1:30 pm	Missouri	Clyde Williams Field; Ames, IA (rivalry)		W 45–17	29,000	
November 20	1:30 pm	Oklahoma State	Clyde Williams Field; Ames, IA		W 54–0	21,000	
November 27	9:30 pm	at San Diego State*	San Diego Stadium; San Diego, CA		W 48–31	25,490	
December 18	12:00 pm	vs. No. 11 LSU*	Sun Bowl; El Paso, TX (Sun Bowl)	CBS	L 15–33	33,530	
*Non-conference game; ^{†}Homecoming; Rankings from AP Poll released prior to the game; All times are in Central time
