= 1970 Missouri Tigers football team =

American college football season

1970 Missouri Tigers football
- Conference: Big Eight Conference
- Record: 5–6 (3–4 Big 8)
- Head coach: Dan Devine (13th season)
- Home stadium: Memorial Stadium

1970 Big Eight Conference football standings
	Conf.					Overall
Team	W		L		T	W		L		T
No. 1 Nebraska $	7	–	0	–	0	11	–	0	–	1
No. 20 Oklahoma	5	–	2	–	0	7	–	4	–	1
Kansas State	5	–	2	–	0	6	–	5	–	0
Missouri	3	–	4	–	0	5	–	6	–	0
Colorado	3	–	4	–	0	6	–	5	–	0
Kansas	2	–	5	–	0	5	–	6	–	0
Oklahoma State	2	–	5	–	0	4	–	7	–	0
Iowa State	1	–	6	–	0	5	–	6	–	0
$ – Conference champion; Rankings from AP Poll

The 1970 Missouri Tigers football team was an American football team that represented the University of Missouri in the Big Eight Conference (Big 8) during the 1970 NCAA University Division football season. Led by Dan Devine in his 13th and final season as head coach, the Tigers compiled an overall record of 5–6 with a mark of 3–4 in conference play, tied for fourth place in the Big 8, and outscored opponents by a combined total of 243-223. The team played its home games at Memorial Stadium in Columbia, Missouri.

The team's statistical leaders included James Harrison with 702 rushing yards, Chuck Roper with 1,097 passing yards and 1,141 yards of total offense, John Henley with 481 receiving yards, and Jack Bastable with 60 points scored.

== Schedule ==
Date	Time	Opponent	Rank	Site	Result	Attendance	Source
September 11		vs. Baylor*		Busch Memorial Stadium; St. Louis, MO	W 38–0	32,000	
September 19		Minnesota*	No. 10	Memorial Stadium; Columbia, MO	W 34–12	57,200	
September 26		No. 20 Air Force*	No. 9	Busch Memorial Stadium; St. Louis, MO	L 14–37	43,118	
October 3		at Oklahoma State	No. 20	Lewis Field; Stillwater, OK	W 40–20	33,000	
October 10		at No. 6 Nebraska	No. 16	Memorial Stadium; Lincoln, NE (rivalry)	L 7–21	67,538	
October 17		No. 3 Notre Dame*	No. 18	Memorial Stadium; Columbia, MO	L 7–24	64,200	
October 24		No. 19 Colorado		Memorial Stadium; Columbia, MO	W 30–16	57,000	
October 31		at Kansas State	No. 17	KSU Stadium; Manhattan, KS	L 13–17	42,000	
November 7		at Oklahoma		Oklahoma Memorial Stadium; Norman, OK (rivalry)	L 13–28	54,750	
November 14	1:30 p.m.	Iowa State		Memorial Stadium; Columbia, MO (rivalry)	L 19–31	56,000	
November 21		Kansas		Memorial Stadium; Columbia, MO (Border War)	W 28–17	58,500	
*Non-conference game; Rankings from AP Poll released prior to the game; All times are in Central time

== Roster ==
1970 Missouri Tigers football team roster
Players
Coaches
Offense

Pos.	#	Name	Class
WR	21	Mel Gray	Sr
OT	36	Jim Anderson	Sr
RB	45	Joe Moore	Sr
TE	48	Tyrone Walls	Sr
C	53	Bob Wilson	Sr
OT	75	Larron Jackson	Sr

Defense

Pos.	#	Name	Class
LB	30	Sam Britts	Jr
DB	41	Mike Fink	So

Special teams

Pos.	#	Name	Class

Head coach

- Dan Devine

Coordinators/assistant coaches

Legend

- (C) Team captain
- (S) Suspended
- (I) Ineligible
- Injured
- Redshirt

Roster
