= 1971 Colorado Buffaloes football team =

American college football season

1971 Colorado Buffaloes football

Astro-Bluebonnet Bowl champion

Astro-Bluebonnet Bowl, W 29–17 vs. Houston
- Conference: Big Eight Conference

Ranking
- Coaches: No. 7
- AP: No. 3
- Record: 10–2 (5–2 Big 8)
- Head coach: Eddie Crowder (9th season)
- Defensive coordinator: Jerry Claiborne (1st season)
- MVP: Cliff Branch
- Captains: Brian Foster; Bill Kralicek; Herb Orvis
- Home stadium: Folsom Field

1971 Big Eight Conference football standings
	Conf.					Overall
Team	W		L		T	W		L		T
No. 1 Nebraska $	7	–	0	–	0	13	–	0	–	0
No. 2 Oklahoma	6	–	1	–	0	11	–	1	–	0
No. 3 Colorado	5	–	2	–	0	10	–	2	–	0
Iowa State	4	–	3	–	0	8	–	4	–	0
Kansas State	2	–	5	–	0	5	–	6	–	0
Oklahoma State	2	–	5	–	0	4	–	6	–	1
Kansas	2	–	5	–	0	4	–	7	–	0
Missouri	0	–	7	–	0	1	–	10	–	0
$ – Conference champion; Rankings from AP Poll

The 1971 Colorado Buffaloes football team represented the University of Colorado at Boulder in the Big Eight Conference during the 1971 NCAA University Division football season. Led by ninth-year head coach Eddie Crowder, the Buffaloes were 9–2 in the regular season (5–2 in Big 8, third), and played their home games on campus at Folsom Field in Boulder, Colorado.

Invited to the Astro-Bluebonnet Bowl against host Houston, seventh-ranked Colorado defeated the #15 Cougars 29–17 to finish at 10–2, outscoring their opponents 320–220. The Buffs climbed to third in the final AP poll, behind Nebraska and Oklahoma, also of the Big Eight (and their only two losses, both on the road).

Colorado's next bowl win came nineteen years later. This was the first season of artificial turf at Folsom Field; natural grass returned 28 years later in 1999.

In his only season in Boulder, Jerry Claiborne was the defensive coordinator, previously the head coach for a decade at Virginia Tech. He left to become head coach at Maryland for a decade, then served as head coach at his alma mater, Kentucky, for eight years.

== Schedule ==
Date	Time	Opponent	Rank	Site	TV	Result	Attendance	Source
September 11		at No. 9 LSU*		Tiger Stadium; Baton Rouge, LA		W 31–21	70,099	
September 18		Wyoming*	No. 12	Folsom Field; Boulder, CO		W 56–13	40,729	
September 25		at No. 6 Ohio State*	No. 10	Ohio Stadium; Columbus, OH		W 20–14	85,538	
October 2		Kansas State	No. 6	Folsom Field; Boulder, CO (rivalry)		W 31–21	47,740	
October 9		at Iowa State	No. 5	Clyde Williams Field; Ames, IA		W 24–14	32,000	
October 16		at No. 2 Oklahoma	No. 6	Oklahoma Memorial Stadium; Norman, OK		L 17–45	61,826	
October 23		Missouri^{†}	No. 11	Folsom Field; Boulder, CO		W 27–7	45,129	
October 30		at No. 1 Nebraska	No. 9	Memorial Stadium; Lincoln, NE (rivalry)	ABC	L 7–31	66,776	
November 6		at Kansas	No. 13	Memorial Stadium; Lawrence, KS		W 35–14	35,500	
November 13		Oklahoma State	No. 12	Folsom Field; Boulder, CO		W 40–6	40,211	
November 20	1:30 p.m.	Air Force*	No. 10	Folsom Field; Boulder, CO		W 53–17	46,362	
December 31		vs. No. 15 Houston*	No. 7	Houston Astrodome; Houston, TX (Astro-Bluebonnet Bowl)	ABC	W 29–17	54,720	
*Non-conference game; ^{†}Homecoming; Rankings from AP Poll released prior to the game; All times are in Mountain time

== Game summaries ==
=== at Ohio State ===
Colorado Buffaloes at Ohio State Buckeyes

Quarter	1	2	3	4	Total
Colorado	6	7	0	7	20
Ohio St	0	0	0	14	14

at Ohio Stadium, Columbus, Ohio

- Date: September 25, 1971
- Game time: 1:30 p.m.
- Game weather: Cloudy, 64 °F (18 °C)
- Game attendance: 85,586
- Box Score

Game information

First quarter

- COL – Ken Johnson 6-yard run (kick failed), 6:51. Colorado 6–0. Drive: 10 plays, 71 yards.

Second quarter

- COL – Cliff Branch 68-yard punt return (J.B. Dean kick), 10:49. Colorado 13–0.

Fourth quarter

- OSU – Don Lamka 1-yard run (Fred Schram kick), 4:28. Colorado 13–7. Drive: 7 plays, 43 yards.
- COL – Ken Johnson 39-yard run (J.B. Dean kick), 3:30. Colorado 20–7. Drive: 3 plays, 45 yards.
- OSU – Rick Middleton 14-yard pass from Don Lamka (Fred Schram kick), 2:11. Colorado 20–14. Drive: 5 plays, 77 yards.

Top passers

- COL – Ken Johnson – 4/9, 97 yards, 2 INT
- OSU – Don Lamka – 20/33, 255 yards, TD

Top rushers

- COL – Charlie Davis – 18 rushes, 135 yards
- OSU – Don Lamka – 23 rushes, 60 yards, TD

Top receivers

- COL – Willie Nichols – 2 receptions, 61 yards
- OSU – Dick Wakefield – 11 receptions, 172 yards

External videos
- 1971 Colorado at Ohio State – highlights

=== Oklahoma State ===
- Charles Davis 342 rush yards (conference record)

== Roster ==
1971 Colorado Buffaloes football team roster
Players
Coaches
Offense

Pos.	#	Name	Class
RB	8	Rich Bland
WR	23	Cliff Branch	Sr
WR	42	Larry Brunson
TE	89	J. V. Cain	So
RB	26	Charlie Davis
QB	10	Joe Duenas
OL	77	Greg Horton
RB		Jon Keyworth
OL	63	Bill Kralicek
OL	61	Chuck Mandrill
RB	41	Bo Matthews	So
OL	50	Bill McDonald
QB	7	Ken Johnson
TE	82	Bob Masten
WR		S. Mendez
WR	39	Willie Nichols
RB	32	John Tarver
RB		L. Thomas
WR		Marv Whitaker
OL	79	Jake Zumbach

Defense

Pos.	#	Name	Class
DL	85	Stu Aldrich
DB	16	Cullen Bryant
LB	64	Lenny Ciufo
DL	73	Mark Cooney
LB	51	Billie Drake
DB	18	Brian Foster
LB	15	Randy Geist
DL	49	Chris Havens
DL		Rick Kay
LB	71	Bud Magrum
LB	58	Dave Orvis
DT	88	Herb Orvis
DB	27	Lorne Richardson
DL	55	John Stavely
DB		John Stearns
DL		Carl Taibi

Special teams

Pos.	#	Name	Class
K		J.B. Dean

Head coach

- Eddie Crowder (9th year)

Coordinators/assistant coaches

- Jerry Claiborne (DC)

Legend

- (C) Team captain
- (S) Suspended
- (I) Ineligible
- Injured
- Redshirt

Roster

== NFL draft ==
Two Buffaloes were selected in the 1972 NFL draft

Player	Position	Round	Overall	Franchise
Herb Orvis	Defensive tackle	1	16	Detroit Lions
Cliff Branch	Wide receiver	4	98	Oakland Raiders
