= 1971 Missouri Tigers football team =

American college football season

1971 Missouri Tigers football
- Conference: Big Eight Conference
- Record: 1–10 (0–7 Big 8)
- Head coach: Al Onofrio (1st season)
- Home stadium: Memorial Stadium

1971 Big Eight Conference football standings
	Conf.					Overall
Team	W		L		T	W		L		T
No. 1 Nebraska $	7	–	0	–	0	13	–	0	–	0
No. 2 Oklahoma	6	–	1	–	0	11	–	1	–	0
No. 3 Colorado	5	–	2	–	0	10	–	2	–	0
Iowa State	4	–	3	–	0	8	–	4	–	0
Kansas State	2	–	5	–	0	5	–	6	–	0
Oklahoma State	2	–	5	–	0	4	–	6	–	1
Kansas	2	–	5	–	0	4	–	7	–	0
Missouri	0	–	7	–	0	1	–	10	–	0
$ – Conference champion; Rankings from AP Poll

The 1971 Missouri Tigers football team was an American football team that represented the University of Missouri as a member of the Big Eight Conference (Big 8) during the 1971 NCAA University Division football season. Led by first-year head coach Al Onofrio, the Tigers compiled a 1–10 record (0–7 against Big 8 opponents), finished in last place in the Big 8, and were outscored by opponents 260 to 93. The team played home games at Memorial Stadium in Columbia, Missouri.

Onofrio succeeded Dan Devine, who took the position of head coach and general manager for the Green Bay Packers of the National Football League (NFL). The 1–10 record set a new mark for futility at Mizzou, matched only by the 1985 team. The team's statistical leaders included Don Johnson with 360 rushing yards, Chuck Roper with 613 passing yards and 726 yards of total offense, John Henley with 247 receiving yards, and Greg Hill with 23 points scored.

== Schedule ==
Date	Time	Opponent	Site	Result	Attendance	Source
September 11	1:30 p.m.	No. 19 Stanford*	Memorial Stadium; Columbia, MO	L 0–19	53,032	
September 18	2:20 p.m.	at Air Force*	Falcon Stadium; Colorado Springs, CO	L 6–7	26,584	
September 25		SMU*	Memorial Stadium; Columbia, MO	W 24–12	49,200	
October 2	1:00 p.m.	at Army*	Michie Stadium; West Point, NY	L 6–22	43,503	
October 9		No. 1 Nebraska	Memorial Stadium; Columbia, MO (rivalry)	L 0–36	61,200	
October 16		Oklahoma State	Memorial Stadium; Columbia, MO	L 16–37	48,835	
October 23		at No. 11 Colorado	Folsom Field; Boulder, CO	L 7–27	45,129	
October 30		Kansas State	Memorial Stadium; Columbia, MO	L 12–28	52,498	
November 6		No. 2 Oklahoma	Memorial Stadium; Columbia, MO (rivalry)	L 3–20	53,011	
November 13		at Iowa State	Clyde Williams Field; Ames, IA (rivalry)	L 17–45	29,000	
November 20		at Kansas	Memorial Stadium; Lawrence, KS (Border War)	L 2–7	46,750	
*Non-conference game; Rankings from AP Poll released prior to the game; All times are in Central time
