= 1970 Nebraska Cornhuskers football team =

American college football season

1970 Nebraska Cornhuskers football

AP Poll national champion FWAA national champion Big Eight champion Orange Bowl champion

Orange Bowl, W 17–12 vs. LSU
- Conference: Big Eight Conference

Ranking
- Coaches: No. 3
- AP: No. 1
- Record: 11–0–1 (7–0 Big Eight)
- Head coach: Bob Devaney (9th season)
- Offensive coordinator: Tom Osborne (2nd season)
- Offensive scheme: I formation
- Defensive coordinator: Monte Kiffin (2nd season)
- Base defense: 5–2
- Home stadium: Memorial Stadium

1970 Big Eight Conference football standings
| | Conf. | | | | | Overall |
| Team | W | | L | | T | W | | L | | T |
|---|---|---|---|---|---|---|---|---|---|---|
| No. 1 Nebraska $ | 7 | – | 0 | – | 0 | 11 | – | 0 | – | 1 |
| No. 20 Oklahoma | 5 | – | 2 | – | 0 | 7 | – | 4 | – | 1 |
| Kansas State | 5 | – | 2 | – | 0 | 6 | – | 5 | – | 0 |
| Missouri | 3 | – | 4 | – | 0 | 5 | – | 6 | – | 0 |
| Colorado | 3 | – | 4 | – | 0 | 6 | – | 5 | – | 0 |
| Kansas | 2 | – | 5 | – | 0 | 5 | – | 6 | – | 0 |
| Oklahoma State | 2 | – | 5 | – | 0 | 4 | – | 7 | – | 0 |
| Iowa State | 1 | – | 6 | – | 0 | 5 | – | 6 | – | 0 |
$ – Conference champion; Rankings from AP Poll

The 1970 Nebraska Cornhuskers football team represented the University of Nebraska–Lincoln in the 1970 NCAA University Division football season. The team was coached by Bob Devaney and played their home games in Memorial Stadium in Lincoln. The Huskers went 11–0–1 to win their first national championship in school history.

The Huskers started the season at No. 9 and tied No. 3 USC in Los Angeles in the second game of the season. After winning their next nine games, including all seven in the Big Eight, Nebraska was ranked No. 3 in the nation entering the Orange Bowl against No. 5 LSU of the SEC. Top-ranked Texas and No. 2 Ohio State both lost their bowl games earlier in the day and a 17–12 Nebraska victory that night in Miami gave the Cornhuskers their first national championship in school history.

Through the 1973 season, the final UPI Coaches' Poll was released in early December, before the bowl games. In 1970 it picked Texas as national champion on December 8, before the Longhorns' 24–11 loss to Notre Dame in the Cotton Bowl in Dallas on New Year's Day. Notre Dame (10–1) finished second to Nebraska in the final AP Poll, released after the bowls in early January.

The 1970 Cornhuskers championship season was notable for Devaney's rotation of two quarterbacks – Van Brownson and Jerry Tagge – in every game.

President Richard Nixon honored Nebraska's 1970 national championship team and head coach Bob Devaney with the presentation of a presidential plaque (noting the team's No. 1 ranking in the final AP Poll and Orange Bowl victory) during a January 14, 1971, celebration at the Nebraska Coliseum.

== Schedule ==
| Date | Time | Opponent | Rank | Site | TV | Result | Attendance | Source |
|---|---|---|---|---|---|---|---|---|
| September 12 | 1:30 pm | Wake Forest* | No. 9 | Memorial Stadium; Lincoln, NE | | W 36–12 | 66,103 | |
| September 19 | 10:00 pm | at No. 3 USC* | No. 9 | Los Angeles Memorial Coliseum; Los Angeles, CA | | T 21–21 | 73,768 | |
| September 26 | 1:30 pm | Army* | No. 8 | Memorial Stadium; Lincoln, NE | | W 28–0 | 66,928 | |
| October 3 | 1:30 pm | at Minnesota* | No. 6 | Memorial Stadium; Minneapolis, MN (rivalry) | | W 35–10 | 52,287 | |
| October 10 | 1:30 pm | No. 16 Missouri | No. 6 | Memorial Stadium; Lincoln, NE (rivalry) | | W 21–7 | 67,538 | |
| October 17 | 1:30 pm | at Kansas | No. 5 | Memorial Stadium; Lawrence, KS (rivalry) | | W 41–20 | 50,200 | |
| October 24 | 1:30 pm | Oklahoma State | No. 4 | Memorial Stadium; Lincoln, NE | | W 65–31 | 67,822 | |
| October 31 | 1:50 pm | at Colorado | No. 4 | Folsom Field; Boulder, CO (rivalry) | ABC | W 29–13 | 50,881 | |
| November 7 | 1:30 pm | at Iowa State | No. 4 | Clyde Williams Field; Ames, IA (rivalry) | | W 54–29 | 36,000 | |
| November 14 | 1:30 pm | No. 20 Kansas State^{†} | No. 4 | Memorial Stadium; Lincoln, NE (rivalry) | | W 51–13 | 67,894 | |
| November 21 | 1:30 pm | Oklahoma | No. 3 | Memorial Stadium; Lincoln, NE (rivalry) | | W 28–21 | 67,392 | |
| January 1, 1971 | 7:35 pm | vs. No. 5 LSU* | No. 3 | Miami Orange Bowl; Miami, FL (Orange Bowl) | NBC | W 17–12 | 80,699 | |
*Non-conference game; ^{†}Homecoming; Rankings from AP Poll released prior to the game; All times are in Central time; Source:

== Roster ==
| Adkins, John #57 (Jr.) DE; Anderson, Frosty #89 (So.) SE; Anderson, Jim #18 (Jr.) RCB; Austin, Al #78 (So.) OT; Beran, Mike #62 (So.) OG; Blahak, Joe #27 (So.) LCB; Bomberger, Bill #46 (Sr.) FB; Branch, Jim #51 (So.) LB; Brownson, Van #12 (Jr.) QB; Butts, Randy #36 (So.) HB; Carstens, Jim #47 (So.) FB; Cox, Woody #83 (Jr.) SE; Decker, John #21 (Sr.) LCB; Deyke, Tom #92 (So.) DE; Didur, Dale #84 (Sr.) SE; Duffy, Joe #52 (So.) MG; Dumler, Doug #54 (So.) C Dutton, John #90 (So.) DT; Glover, Rich #79 (So.) DT; Goeller, Dave #28 (So.) HB; Grenfell, Bob #59 (Sr.) OG; Harper, Willie #81 (So.) DE; Harvey, Phil #82 (Jr.) TE; Hauge, Bruce #48 (So.) LB; Henderson, Joe #73 (So.) OT; Hollstein, Gary #29 (Jr.) S Hughes, Dennis #63 (So.) OG; Hughes, Jeff #26 (Jr.) HB; Hyland, John #58 (So.) DE | Ingles, Guy #88 (Sr.) SE; Jacobson, Larry #75 (Jr.) DT; Jamail, Doug #50 (So.) C Janssen, Bill #55 (Jr.) C Jennings, Henry #38 (Jr.) MON; Johnson, Carl #71 (Jr.) OT; Johnson, Doug #64 (So.) DE; Johnson, Monte #37 (So.) DE; Jones, Bob #15 (So.) QB; Kinney, Jeff #35 (Jr.) HB; Kinsel, John #54 (So.) C Kosch, Bill #24 (Jr.) S Linder, Max #11 (So.) QB; List, Jerry #85 (So.) TE; Longwell, Brent #91 (So.) P Lowe, Rex #83 (Sr.) SE; Malone, Dan (Unk) DT; Mason, Dave #25 (Jr.) MON; McClelland, Tom #16 (Jr.) S McFarland, Bob #10 (So.) LCB; McGhee, Donnie #70 (Sr.) OT; Miller, Jim (Unk) DE; Morell, Pat #40 (Jr.) LB; Morock, David #43 (Sr.) MON; Murtaugh, Jerry #42 (Sr.) LB; Newton, Bob #74 (Sr.) OT; Newton, Clint #13 (Jr.) RCB; Norberg, Bill #32 (So.) HB; O'Connell, John #34 (So.) S | Olds, Bill #44 (So.) FB; Orduna, Joe #31 (Sr.) HB; Pabis, Bob #66 (So.) MG; Peetz, Mike #33 (So.) MON; Periard, Ed #56 (Sr.) MG; Pitts, John #80 (So.) DE; Pogge, Bill #17 (So.) DE; Powell, Ralph #41 (So.) FB; Robinson, Tom #68 (So.) DT; Rodgers, Johnny #20 (So.) HB; Rogers, Paul #30 (Sr.) CB; Rupert, Dick #77 (Jr.) OT; Schloff, Merle #69 (So.) DT; Schmit, Bob #23 (So.) HB; Schneiss, Dan #22 (Sr.) FB; Schultz, Kelly #87 (So.) TE; Strong, Jon #49 (So.) LB; Tagge, Jerry #14 (Jr.) QB; Terrio, Bob #45 (Jr.) FB; Vactor, Frank #19 (Sr.) HB; Walline, Dave #76 (Sr.) DT; Weber, Bruce #61 (Jr.) OG; White, Daryl #72 (So.) OT; Winter, Wally #67 (Sr.) OT; Wolfe, Bob #86 (So.) TE; Wortman, Keith #65 (Jr.) OG; Yanda, Steve #39 (So.) LB |

Defense

FS
Bill Kosch
Tom McClelland
Henry Jennings

| INSDIE | INSDIE |
|---|---|
| Bob Terrio | Jerry Murtaugh |
| Pat Morell | Bruce Hauge |
| Jim Branch | Steve Yanda |

MONSTER BACK
David Morock
Garry Hollstein
Dave Mason

CB
Joe Blahak
John Decker
Wes Mabin

| DE | DT | NT | DT | DE |
|---|---|---|---|---|
| Willie Harper | Dave Walline | Ed Periard | Larry Jacobson | John Adkins |
| John Pitts | Rich Glover | Bob Pabis | Monte Johnson | John Hyland |
| Bill Pogge | John Dutton. | Monte Johnson | Dan Malone | Doug Johnson |

CB
Jim Anderson
Paul Rogers
Bob McFarland

Offense

SE
Guy Ingles
Woody Cox
Dale Didur

| LT | LG | C | RG | RT |
|---|---|---|---|---|
| Wally Winter | Donnie McGhee | Doug Dumler | Dick Rupert | Bob Newton |
| Carl Johnson | Bruce Weber | Doug Jamail | Keith Wortman | Bob Grenfell |
| Daryl White | Joe Duffy | John Kinsel | Mike Beran | Al Austin |

TE
Jerry List
Phil Harvey
Bob Wolfe

WB
Johnny Rodgers
Jeff Hughes
Dave Goeller

QB
Jerry Tagge
Van Brownson
Bob Jones

FB
Dan Schneiss
Bill Olds
Jim Carstens

Special teams

RB
Joe Orduna
Jeff Kinney
Frank Vactor

== Coaching staff ==
| Name | Title | First year in this position | Years at Nebraska | Alma mater |
|---|---|---|---|---|
| Bob Devaney | Head Coach | 1962 | 1962–72 | Alma |
| Tom Osborne | Offensive coordinator | 1969 | 1964–97 | Hastings |
| Cletus Fischer | Offensive line | | 1960–85 | Nebraska |
| Carl Selmer | Offensive line | | 1962–72 | |
| Jim Ross | | | 1962–76 | |
| John Melton | Tight Ends, Wingbacks | 1973 | 1962–88 | Wyoming |
| Mike Corgan | Running backs | 1962 | 1962–82 | Notre Dame |
| Monte Kiffin | Defensive coordinator | 1969 | 1967–76 | Nebraska |
| Warren Powers | Defensive backs | | 1969–76 | Nebraska |
| Boyd Epley | Head Strength Coach | 1969 | 1969–2003 | Nebraska |
| Bill Thornton | Assistant Freshman Coach | 1970 | 1969–72 | Nebraska |

== Game summaries ==
=== Wake Forest ===
Wake Forest Demon Deacons at No. 9 Nebraska Cornhuskers – Game summary

| Quarter | 1 | 2 | 3 | 4 | Total |
|---|---|---|---|---|---|
| Demon Deacons | 3 | 2 | 0 | 7 | 12 |
| No. 9 Cornhuskers | 14 | 14 | 8 | 0 | 36 |

at Memorial Stadium • Lincoln, Nebraska

- Date: September 12, 1970
- Game time: 1:30 p.m. CDT
- Game attendance: 66,103
- Referee: Cecil Hankins

| Statistics | WAKE | NEB |
|---|---|---|
| First downs | | |
| Total yards | | |
| Rushes/yards | | |
| Passing yards | | |
| Passing: Comp–Att–Int | | |
| Time of possession | | |

| Team | Category | Player | Statistics |
|---|---|---|---|
| Wake Forest | Passing | | |
| Wake Forest | Rushing | | |
| Wake Forest | Receiving | | |
| Nebraska | Passing | | |
| Nebraska | Rushing | | |
| Nebraska | Receiving | | |

Scoring summary

| Quarter | Time | Drive | | | Team | Scoring information | Score | |
| Quarter | Time | Plays | Yards | TOP | Team | Scoring information | Wake Forest | Nebraska |
|---|---|---|---|---|---|---|---|---|
| "TOP" = time of possession. For other American football terms, see Glossary of American football. | | | | | | | 12 | 36 |

Wake Forest hit first with a field goal thanks to a Nebraska fumble, but by the half it was the Cornhuskers 28–5. The Demon Deacons would go on to win the ACC title, their last until 2006.

=== at No. 3 USC ===
No. 9 Nebraska Cornhuskers at No. 3 USC Trojans – Game summary

| Quarter | 1 | 2 | 3 | 4 | Total |
|---|---|---|---|---|---|
| No. 9 Cornhuskers | 0 | 14 | 7 | 0 | 21 |
| No. 3 Trojans | 0 | 7 | 7 | 7 | 21 |

at Los Angeles Memorial Coliseum • Los Angeles, California

- Date: September 19, 1970
- Game time: 10:00 p.m. CDT
- Game attendance: 73,768

| Statistics | NEB | USC |
|---|---|---|
| First downs | | |
| Total yards | | |
| Rushes/yards | | |
| Passing yards | | |
| Passing: Comp–Att–Int | | |
| Time of possession | | |

| Team | Category | Player | Statistics |
|---|---|---|---|
| Nebraska | Passing | | |
| Nebraska | Rushing | | |
| Nebraska | Receiving | | |
| USC | Passing | | |
| USC | Rushing | | |
| USC | Receiving | | |

Scoring summary

| Quarter | Time | Drive | | | Team | Scoring information | Score | |
| Quarter | Time | Plays | Yards | TOP | Team | Scoring information | Nebraska | USC |
|---|---|---|---|---|---|---|---|---|
| "TOP" = time of possession. For other American football terms, see Glossary of American football. | | | | | | | 21 | 21 |

Nebraska entered the game as a two-touchdown underdog to a USC squad fresh off a 42–21 whipping of Alabama in Birmingham, but never trailed the Trojans during the course of the game. Each team traded touchdowns, and each team missed opportunities for the win, right up to USC's incomplete 50-yard pass on the last play of the game.

Ironically, USC aided Nebraska's national championship push by defeating then-No. 2 Notre Dame 38–28 at Los Angeles in the regular season finale. The Trojans came into the rivalry just 5–4–1, while the Fighting Irish was 9–0.

=== Army ===
Army Cadets at No. 8 Nebraska Cornhuskers – Game summary

| Quarter | 1 | 2 | 3 | 4 | Total |
|---|---|---|---|---|---|
| Cadets | 0 | 0 | 0 | 0 | 0 |
| No. 8 Cornhuskers | 0 | 7 | 14 | 7 | 28 |

at Memorial Stadium • Lincoln, Nebraska

- Date: September 26, 1970
- Game time: 1:30 p.m. CDT
- Game attendance: 66,928

| Statistics | ARMY | NEB |
|---|---|---|
| First downs | | |
| Total yards | | |
| Rushes/yards | | |
| Passing yards | | |
| Passing: Comp–Att–Int | | |
| Time of possession | | |

| Team | Category | Player | Statistics |
|---|---|---|---|
| Army | Passing | | |
| Army | Rushing | | |
| Army | Receiving | | |
| Nebraska | Passing | | |
| Nebraska | Rushing | | |
| Nebraska | Receiving | | |

Scoring summary

| Quarter | Time | Drive | | | Team | Scoring information | Score | |
| Quarter | Time | Plays | Yards | TOP | Team | Scoring information | Army | Nebraska |
|---|---|---|---|---|---|---|---|---|
| "TOP" = time of possession. For other American football terms, see Glossary of American football. | | | | | | | 0 | 28 |

Nebraska owned the day, shutting out Army 28–0 in an otherwise unremarkable game.

=== at Minnesota ===
No. 6 Nebraska Cornhuskers at Minnesota Golden Gophers – Game summary

| Quarter | 1 | 2 | 3 | 4 | Total |
|---|---|---|---|---|---|
| No. 6 Cornhuskers | 21 | 7 | 0 | 7 | 35 |
| Golden Gophers | 7 | 3 | 0 | 0 | 10 |

at Memorial Stadium • Minneapolis, Minnesota

- Date: October 3, 1970
- Game time: 1:30 p.m. CDT
- Game attendance: 52,287

| Statistics | NEB | MINN |
|---|---|---|
| First downs | | |
| Total yards | | |
| Rushes/yards | | |
| Passing yards | | |
| Passing: Comp–Att–Int | | |
| Time of possession | | |

| Team | Category | Player | Statistics |
|---|---|---|---|
| Nebraska | Passing | | |
| Nebraska | Rushing | | |
| Nebraska | Receiving | | |
| Minnesota | Passing | | |
| Minnesota | Rushing | | |
| Minnesota | Receiving | | |

Scoring summary

| Quarter | Time | Drive | | | Team | Scoring information | Score | |
| Quarter | Time | Plays | Yards | TOP | Team | Scoring information | Nebraska | Minnesota |
|---|---|---|---|---|---|---|---|---|
| "TOP" = time of possession. For other American football terms, see Glossary of American football. | | | | | | | 35 | 10 |

Bob Devaney's record against the Big 10 was extended to 9–0 as the Cornhuskers had little trouble with Minnesota after running ahead 28–10 before the half.

=== Missouri ===
No. 16 Missouri Tigers at No. 6 Nebraska Cornhuskers – Game summary

| Quarter | 1 | 2 | 3 | 4 | Total |
|---|---|---|---|---|---|
| No. 16 Tigers | 0 | 7 | 0 | 0 | 7 |
| No. 6 Cornhuskers | 7 | 0 | 0 | 14 | 21 |

at Memorial Stadium • Lincoln, Nebraska

- Date: October 10, 1970
- Game time: 1:30 p.m. CDT
- Game attendance: 67,538
- Referee: Earl Shostrom

| Statistics | MIZ | NEB |
|---|---|---|
| First downs | | |
| Total yards | | |
| Rushes/yards | | |
| Passing yards | | |
| Passing: Comp–Att–Int | | |
| Time of possession | | |

| Team | Category | Player | Statistics |
|---|---|---|---|
| Missouri | Passing | | |
| Missouri | Rushing | | |
| Missouri | Receiving | | |
| Nebraska | Passing | | |
| Nebraska | Rushing | | |
| Nebraska | Receiving | | |

Scoring summary

| Quarter | Time | Drive | | | Team | Scoring information | Score | |
| Quarter | Time | Plays | Yards | TOP | Team | Scoring information | Missouri | Nebraska |
|---|---|---|---|---|---|---|---|---|
| "TOP" = time of possession. For other American football terms, see Glossary of American football. | | | | | | | 7 | 21 |

Nebraska scored only 7 points in the first half, and Missouri matched it before the half. The subsequent defensive battle continued through into the 4th quarter before the Cornhuskers broke away with an additional 14 points, one from a 48-yard punt return touchdown.

=== at Kansas ===
No. 5 Nebraska Cornhuskers at Kansas Jayhawks – Game summary

| Quarter | 1 | 2 | 3 | 4 | Total |
|---|---|---|---|---|---|
| No. 5 Cornhuskers | 10 | 14 | 7 | 10 | 41 |
| Jayhawks | 6 | 14 | 0 | 0 | 20 |

at Memorial Stadium • Lawrence, Kansas

- Date: October 17, 1970
- Game time: 1:30 p.m. CDT
- Game attendance: 50,000

| Statistics | NEB | KU |
|---|---|---|
| First downs | | |
| Total yards | | |
| Rushes/yards | | |
| Passing yards | | |
| Passing: Comp–Att–Int | | |
| Time of possession | | |

| Team | Category | Player | Statistics |
|---|---|---|---|
| Nebraska | Passing | | |
| Nebraska | Rushing | | |
| Nebraska | Receiving | | |
| Kansas | Passing | | |
| Kansas | Rushing | | |
| Kansas | Receiving | | |

Scoring summary

| Quarter | Time | Drive | | | Team | Scoring information | Score | |
| Quarter | Time | Plays | Yards | TOP | Team | Scoring information | Nebraska | Kansas |
|---|---|---|---|---|---|---|---|---|
| "TOP" = time of possession. For other American football terms, see Glossary of American football. | | | | | | | 41 | 20 |

Nebraska was surprised to find themselves behind 10–20 with 10 minutes left in the 1st half, but battled back to take the lead with two more touchdowns before the break, and never let Kansas score again as they cruised to a 41–20 final.

=== Oklahoma State ===
Oklahoma State Cowboys at No. 4 Nebraska Cornhuskers – Game summary

| Quarter | 1 | 2 | 3 | 4 | Total |
|---|---|---|---|---|---|
| Cowboys | 7 | 0 | 6 | 18 | 31 |
| No. 8 Cornhuskers | 14 | 27 | 10 | 14 | 65 |

at Memorial Stadium • Lincoln, Nebraska

- Date: October 24, 1970
- Game time: 1:30 p.m. CDT
- Game attendance: 67,822
- Referee: Vance Carlson

| Statistics | OK ST | NEB |
|---|---|---|
| First downs | | |
| Total yards | | |
| Rushes/yards | | |
| Passing yards | | |
| Passing: Comp–Att–Int | | |
| Time of possession | | |

| Team | Category | Player | Statistics |
|---|---|---|---|
| Oklahoma State | Passing | | |
| Oklahoma State | Rushing | | |
| Oklahoma State | Receiving | | |
| Nebraska | Passing | | |
| Nebraska | Rushing | | |
| Nebraska | Receiving | | |

Scoring summary

| Quarter | Time | Drive | | | Team | Scoring information | Score | |
| Quarter | Time | Plays | Yards | TOP | Team | Scoring information | Oklahoma State | Nebraska |
|---|---|---|---|---|---|---|---|---|
| 1 | 8:39 | | | | Nebraska | Orduna 3-yard touchdown run, Rogers kick no good | 0 | 6 |
| 1 | 8:26 | – | – | – | Oklahoma State | Graham 98-yard punt return for a touchdown, Pruss kick good | 7 | 6 |
| 1 | 4:56 | – | – | – | Nebraska | Interception returned 37 yards for touchdown by Adkins, 2-point pass by Brownson good | 7 | 14 |
| 2 | 12:22 | | | | Nebraska | 42-yard field goal by Rogers | 7 | 17 |
| 2 | 10:22 | | | | Nebraska | Ingles 40-yard touchdown reception from Brownson, Rogers kick good | 7 | 24 |
| 2 | 5:34 | | | | Nebraska | Orduna 2-yard touchdown run, Rogers kick good | 7 | 31 |
| 2 | 4:03 | – | – | – | Nebraska | Rodgers 66-yard punt return for a touchdown, Rogers kick good | 7 | 38 |
| 2 | 0:00 | | | | Nebraska | 41-yard field goal by Rogers | 7 | 41 |
| 3 | 12:23 | | | | Oklahoma State | Eben 10-yard touchdown reception from Pounds, 2-point run by pounds failed | 13 | 41 |
| 3 | 6:15 | | | | Nebraska | 38-yard field goal by Rogers | 13 | 44 |
| 3 | 0:11 | | | | Nebraska | Kinney 2-yard touchdown run, Rogers kick good | 13 | 51 |
| 4 | 12:52 | | | | Oklahoma State | Eben 35-yard touchdown reception from Pounds, 2-point run by Pounds failed | 19 | 51 |
| 4 | 9:07 | | | | Nebraska | Cox 26-yard touchdown reception from Tagge, Rogers kick good | 19 | 58 |
| 4 | 8:16 | – | – | – | Nebraska | Interception returned 73 yards for touchdown by Decker, Rogers kick good | 19 | 65 |
| 4 | 4:31 | | | | Nebraska | Graham 13-yard touchdown reception from Pounds, 2-point pass by Pounds failed | 25 | 65 |
| 4 | 0:00 | | | | Oklahoma State | Graham 84-yard touchdown reception from Pounds, 2-point run by Pounds failed | 31 | 65 |
| "TOP" = time of possession. For other American football terms, see Glossary of American football. | | | | | | | 31 | 65 |

Nebraska piled up 65 points, its highest total since 1922, and held Oklahoma State to just 64 ground yards as the Cornhuskers made short work of the Cowboys.

=== at Colorado ===
No. 4 Nebraska Cornhuskers at Colorado Buffaloes – Game summary

| Quarter | 1 | 2 | 3 | 4 | Total |
|---|---|---|---|---|---|
| No. 4 Cornhuskers | 12 | 0 | 3 | 14 | 29 |
| Buffaloes | 0 | 7 | 0 | 6 | 13 |

at Folsom Field • Boulder, Colorado

- Date: October 31, 1970
- Game time: 1:50 p.m. CST
- Game attendance: 50,881
- TV announcers (ABC): Chris Schenkel (play-by-play) and Bud Wilkinson (color commentator)

| Statistics | NEB | COL |
|---|---|---|
| First downs | | |
| Total yards | | |
| Rushes/yards | | |
| Passing yards | | |
| Passing: Comp–Att–Int | | |
| Time of possession | | |

| Team | Category | Player | Statistics |
|---|---|---|---|
| Nebraska | Passing | | |
| Nebraska | Rushing | | |
| Nebraska | Receiving | | |
| Colorado | Passing | | |
| Colorado | Rushing | | |
| Colorado | Receiving | | |

Scoring summary

| Quarter | Time | Drive | | | Team | Scoring information | Score | |
| Quarter | Time | Plays | Yards | TOP | Team | Scoring information | Nebraska | Colorado |
|---|---|---|---|---|---|---|---|---|
| 1 | 11:17 | | | | Nebraska | Ingles 35-yard touchdown reception from Brownson, Rogers kick no good | 6 | 0 |
| 1 | 2:53 | | | | Nebraska | Ingles 39-yard touchdown reception from Brownson, 2-point run by Orduna failed | 12 | 0 |
| 2 | 2:14 | | | | Colorado | Branch 7-yard touchdown run, Haney kick good | 15 | 7 |
| 3 | 2:17 | | | | Nebraska | 46-yard field goal by Rogers | 15 | 7 |
| 4 | 11:22 | | | | Colorado | Bratten 5-yard touchdown run, 2-point run by Branch failed | 15 | 13 |
| 4 | 9:27 | | | | Nebraska | Brownson 1-yard touchdown run, Rogers kick good | 22 | 13 |
| 4 | 5:34 | | | | Nebraska | Kinney 7-yard touchdown run, Rogers kick good | 29 | 13 |
| "TOP" = time of possession. For other American football terms, see Glossary of American football. | | | | | | | 29 | 13 |

Nebraska pulled out in front right away with a 12–0 1st quarter lead, but stubborn Colorado fought back and trailed the Cornhuskers by only 13–15 in the 4th quarter – after missing a 2-point conversion that would have tied the game – before Nebraska decided to stop the uprising with two touchdowns in the last 10 minutes to pull away.

=== at Iowa State ===
No. 4 Nebraska Cornhuskers at Iowa State Cyclones – Game summary

| Quarter | 1 | 2 | 3 | 4 | Total |
|---|---|---|---|---|---|
| No. 4 Cornhuskers | 12 | 14 | 21 | 7 | 54 |
| Cyclones | 0 | 11 | 6 | 12 | 29 |

at Clyde Williams Field • Ames, Iowa

- Date: November 7, 1970
- Game time: 1:30 p.m. CST
- Game attendance: 34,007

| Statistics | NEB | IOWA ST |
|---|---|---|
| First downs | | |
| Total yards | | |
| Rushes/yards | | |
| Passing yards | | |
| Passing: Comp–Att–Int | | |
| Time of possession | | |

| Team | Category | Player | Statistics |
|---|---|---|---|
| Nebraska | Passing | | |
| Nebraska | Rushing | | |
| Nebraska | Receiving | | |
| Iowa State | Passing | | |
| Iowa State | Rushing | | |
| Iowa State | Receiving | | |

Scoring summary

| Quarter | Time | Drive | | | Team | Scoring information | Score | |
| Quarter | Time | Plays | Yards | TOP | Team | Scoring information | Nebraska | Iowa State |
|---|---|---|---|---|---|---|---|---|
| 1 | 7:52 | | | | Nebraska | Orduna 3-yard touchdown run, Rogers kick no good (blocked) | 6 | 0 |
| 1 | 1:53 | | | | Nebraska | Orduna 8-yard touchdown run, 2-point pass by Tagge failed | 12 | 0 |
| 2 | 9:33 | | | | Iowa State | 39-yard field goal by Shoemaker | 12 | 3 |
| 2 | 6:01 | | | | Nebraska | Tagge 1-yard touchdown run, Rogers kick good | 19 | 3 |
| 2 | 1:52 | | | | Nebraska | Schneiss 7-yard touchdown reception from Tagge, Rogers kick good | 26 | 3 |
| 2 | 0:47 | | | | Iowa State | Stowe 33-yard touchdown reception from Carlson, 2-point run by Stowe good | 26 | 11 |
| 3 | 4:33 | | | | Nebraska | Rodgers 14-yard touchdown reception from Tagge, Rogers kick good | 33 | 11 |
| 3 | 4:01 | | | | Iowa State | Johnson 20-yard touchdown reception from Carlson, 2-point pass by Carlson failed | 33 | 17 |
| 3 | 3:07 | | | | Nebraska | Orduna 6-yard touchdown run, Rogers kick good | 40 | 17 |
| 3 | 0:31 | | | | Nebraska | Schneiss 23-yard touchdown run, Rogers kick good | 47 | 17 |
| 4 | 5:43 | | | | Nebraska | Vactor 2-yard touchdown run, Rogers kick good | 54 | 17 |
| 4 | 1:53 | | | | Iowa State | Stowe 10-yard touchdown reception from Amundson, 2-point run by Stowe failed | 54 | 23 |
| 4 | 0:42 | | | | Iowa State | McCurry 54-yard touchdown reception from Amundson, 2-point pass by Amundson failed | 54 | 29 |
| "TOP" = time of possession. For other American football terms, see Glossary of American football. | | | | | | | 54 | 17 |

The game was not as close as the score indicates, as Iowa State put up two late touchdowns against Nebraska reserves in the 4th quarter after the Cornhuskers had run up a 54–17 lead with 5 minutes remaining to play.

=== No. 20 Kansas State ===
No. 20 Kansas State Wildcats at No. 4 Nebraska Cornhuskers – Game summary

| Quarter | 1 | 2 | 3 | 4 | Total |
|---|---|---|---|---|---|
| No. 20 Wildcats | 0 | 7 | 0 | 6 | 13 |
| No. 4 Cornhuskers | 14 | 7 | 16 | 14 | 51 |

at Memorial Stadium • Lincoln, Nebraska

- Date: November 14, 1970
- Game time: 1:30 p.m. CST
- Game attendance: 67,894
- Referee: John Mishaluka

| Statistics | K STATE | NEB |
|---|---|---|
| First downs | | |
| Total yards | | |
| Rushes/yards | | |
| Passing yards | | |
| Passing: Comp–Att–Int | | |
| Time of possession | | |

| Team | Category | Player | Statistics |
|---|---|---|---|
| Kansas State | Passing | | |
| Kansas State | Rushing | | |
| Kansas State | Receiving | | |
| Nebraska | Passing | | |
| Nebraska | Rushing | | |
| Nebraska | Receiving | | |

Scoring summary

| Quarter | Time | Drive | | | Team | Scoring information | Score | |
| Quarter | Time | Plays | Yards | TOP | Team | Scoring information | Kansas State | Nebraska |
|---|---|---|---|---|---|---|---|---|
| 1 | 12:48 | | | | Nebraska | Rogers 30-yard touchdown run, Rogers kick good | 0 | 7 |
| 1 | 0:22 | | | | Nebraska | Orduna 3-yard touchdown run, Rogers kick good | 0 | 14 |
| 2 | 11:17 | | | | Kansas State | Montgomery 8-yard touchdown reception from Dickey, Arregui kick good | 7 | 14 |
| 2 | 6:42 | | | | Nebraska | Orduna 16-yard touchdown run, Rogers kick good | 7 | 21 |
| 3 | 8:17 | | | | Nebraska | 23-yard field goal by Rogers | 7 | 24 |
| 3 | | | | | Nebraska | Orduna 1-yard touchdown run, Rogers kick no good | 7 | 30 |
| 3 | 0:58 | | | | Nebraska | Schneiss 12-yard touchdown reception from Tagge, Rogers kick good | 7 | 37 |
| 4 | 13:15 | | | | Nebraska | Orduna 2-yard touchdown run, Rogers kick good | 7 | 44 |
| 4 | 12:59 | – | – | – | Nebraska | Interception returned 43 yards for touchdown by Morock, Rogers kick good | 7 | 51 |
| 4 | 5:07 | | | | Kansas State | Chapin 1-yard touchdown run, 2-point pass by Dickey failed | 13 | 51 |
| "TOP" = time of possession. For other American football terms, see Glossary of American football. | | | | | | | 13 | 51 |

Kansas State came to Lincoln with hopes of a Big Eight title opportunity, but they were not prepared for the domination that Nebraska would show them in a convincing defeat. The Wildcats managed only two touchdowns, one of which came with 5 minutes remaining in the 4th against the Nebraska reserves. At one point in the game, the Cornhuskers exploded for 27 points in less than 4 minutes, pushing their lead out to 51–7.

=== Oklahoma ===
Oklahoma Sooners at No. 3 Nebraska Cornhuskers – Game summary

| Quarter | 1 | 2 | 3 | 4 | Total |
|---|---|---|---|---|---|
| Sooners | 0 | 14 | 0 | 7 | 21 |
| No. 3 Cornhuskers | 0 | 14 | 7 | 7 | 28 |

at Memorial Stadium • Lincoln, Nebraska

- Date: November 21, 1970
- Game time: 1:30 p.m. CST
- Game attendance: 67,392

| Statistics | OU | NEB |
|---|---|---|
| First downs | | |
| Total yards | | |
| Rushes/yards | | |
| Passing yards | | |
| Passing: Comp–Att–Int | | |
| Time of possession | | |

| Team | Category | Player | Statistics |
|---|---|---|---|
| Oklahoma | Passing | | |
| Oklahoma | Rushing | | |
| Oklahoma | Receiving | | |
| Nebraska | Passing | | |
| Nebraska | Rushing | | |
| Nebraska | Receiving | | |

Scoring summary

| Quarter | Time | Drive | | | Team | Scoring information | Score | |
| Quarter | Time | Plays | Yards | TOP | Team | Scoring information | Oklahoma | Nebraska |
|---|---|---|---|---|---|---|---|---|
| 2 | 10:02 | | | | Oklahoma | Mildren 6-yard touchdown run, Derr kick good | 7 | 0 |
| 2 | 8:30 | | | | Nebraska | Rodgers 53-yard touchdown reception from Tagge, Rogers kick good | 7 | 7 |
| 2 | 6:30 | | | | Oklahoma | Wylie 37-yard touchdown run, Derr kick good | 14 | 7 |
| 2 | 1:35 | | | | Nebraska | Orduna 3-yard touchdown run, Rogers kick good | 14 | 14 |
| 3 | 5:54 | | | | Nebraska | Ingles 13-yard touchdown reception from Tagge, Rogers kick good | 14 | 21 |
| 4 | 14:48 | | | | Oklahoma | Franklin 10-yard touchdown reception from Wylie, Derr kick good | 21 | 21 |
| 4 | 7:42 | | | | Nebraska | Tagge 1-yard touchdown run, Rogers kick good | 21 | 28 |
| "TOP" = time of possession. For other American football terms, see Glossary of American football. | | | | | | | 21 | 28 |

Nebraska locked up their first unbeaten regular season since 1965 by coming from behind twice to get the win over stubborn Oklahoma. It wasn't until 7:42 remained in the 4th quarter that Nebraska pulled ahead by a touchdown to settle the final score.

=== No. 5 LSU (Orange Bowl) ===
1971 Orange Bowl: No. 5 LSU Tigers vs. No. 3 Nebraska Cornhuskers – Game summary

| Quarter | 1 | 2 | 3 | 4 | Total |
|---|---|---|---|---|---|
| No. 5 Tigers | 0 | 3 | 9 | 0 | 12 |
| No. 3 Cornhuskers | 10 | 0 | 0 | 7 | 17 |

at Miami Orange Bowl • Miami, Florida

- Date: January 1, 1971
- Game time: 7:35 p.m. CST
- Game attendance: 80,699
- Referee: Vance Carlson
- TV announcers (NBC): Jim Simpson (play-by-play) and Al DeRogatis (color commentator)

| Statistics | LSU | NEB |
|---|---|---|
| First downs | 20 | 18 |
| Total yards | 278 | 293 |
| Rushes/yards | 45–51 | 48–132 |
| Passing yards | 227 | 161 |
| Return yards | 3 | 3 |
| Fumbles/lost | 4–3 | 4–3 |
| Passing: Comp–Att–Int | 17–32–1 | 14–28–2 |
| Punts/average | 8–32.5 | 6–37.7 |
| Penalties/yards | 4–27 | 8–67 |
| Time of possession | | |

| Team | Category | Player | Statistics |
|---|---|---|---|
| LSU | Passing | | |
| LSU | Rushing | | |
| LSU | Receiving | | |
| Nebraska | Passing | | |
| Nebraska | Rushing | | |
| Nebraska | Receiving | | |

Scoring summary

| Quarter | Time | Drive | | | Team | Scoring information | Score | |
| Quarter | Time | Plays | Yards | TOP | Team | Scoring information | LSU | Nebraska |
|---|---|---|---|---|---|---|---|---|
| 1 | 2:40 | | | | Nebraska | 26-yard field goal by Rogers | 0 | 3 |
| 1 | 2:06 | | | | Nebraska | Orduna 3-yard touchdown run, Rogers kick good | 0 | 10 |
| 2 | 0:49 | | | | LSU | 36-yard field goal by Lumpkin | 3 | 10 |
| 3 | 11:49 | | | | LSU | 25-yard field goal by Lumpkin | 6 | 10 |
| 3 | 0:00 | | | | LSU | Chaffee 31-yard touchdown reception from Lee, Lumpkin kick no good | 12 | 10 |
| 4 | 8:50 | | | | Nebraska | Tagge 1-yard touchdown run, Rogers kick good | 12 | 17 |
| "TOP" = time of possession. For other American football terms, see Glossary of American football. | | | | | | | 12 | 17 |

Third-ranked Nebraska jumped to a 10–0 lead in the first quarter and lead 10–3 at halftime, but #5 LSU fought back to make a game of it, pulling ahead on a field goal at the end of the 3rd quarter to get to 12–10. With over eight minutes remaining, Jerry Tagge jumped over the pile from the 1-yard line for the game's final points, and the Blackshirts held on the rest of the way to preserve the win. Top-ranked Texas and #2 Ohio State both lost their bowl games earlier in the day, which allowed the Huskers to claim their first national championship.

== Stats ==
Team Stats

Team
| | | Passing | | | | | Rushing | | | |
| Split | G | Cmp | Att | Pct | Yds | TD | Att | Yds | Avg | TD |
|---|---|---|---|---|---|---|---|---|---|---|
| Offense | 12 | 14.0 | 22.9 | 61.1 | 186.8 | 1.7 | 57.1 | 223.8 | 3.9 | 2.8 |
| Defense | 12 | 12.8 | 26.8 | 47.5 | 163.6 | 1.0 | 42.2 | 140.2 | 3.3 | 1.0 |
| Difference | | +1.2 | +3.9 | +13.6 | +23.2 | +0.7 | +14.9 | +83.6 | +0.6 | +1.8 |

Passing

Passing
| Player | G | Cmp | Att | Pct | Yds | Y/A | AY/A | TD | Int | Rate |
|---|---|---|---|---|---|---|---|---|---|---|
| Tagge | 12 | 116 | 190 | 61.1 | 1536 | 8.1 | 7.5 | 12 | 8 | 141.4 |
| Brownson | 12 | 49 | 75 | 65.3 | 667 | 8.9 | 8.7 | 6 | 3 | 158.4 |
| Jones | 12 | 1 | 5 | 20.0 | 7 | 1.4 | 1.4 | 0 | 0 | 31.8 |
| Schneiss | 12 | 1 | 3 | 33.3 | 17 | 5.7 | −2.7 | 1 | 1 | 124.3 |
| Orduna | 12 | 1 | 1 | 100.0 | 14 | 14.0 | 34.0 | 1 | 0 | 547.6 |
| Rodgers | 12 | 0 | 1 | 0.0 | 0 | 0.0 | 0.0 | 0 | 0 | 0.0 |

Rushing & Receiving

Rushing & Receiving
| | | Rushing | | | | Receiving | | | | Scrimmage | | | |
| Player | G | Att | Yds | Avg | TD | Rec | Yds | Avg | TD | Plays | Yds | Avg | TD |
|---|---|---|---|---|---|---|---|---|---|---|---|---|---|
| Orduna | 12 | 200 | 897 | 4.5 | 15 | 11 | 85 | 7.7 | 0 | 211 | 982 | 4.7 | 15 |
| Kinney | 12 | 159 | 694 | 4.4 | 4 | 20 | 206 | 10.3 | 1 | 179 | 900 | 5.0 | 5 |
| Tagge | 12 | 85 | 153 | 1.8 | 5 | | | | | 85 | 153 | 1.8 | 5 |
| Schneiss | 12 | 70 | 327 | 4.7 | 2 | 20 | 156 | 7.8 | 2 | 90 | 483 | 5.4 | 4 |
| Brownson | 12 | 50 | 112 | 2.2 | 4 | | | | | 50 | 112 | 2.2 | 4 |
| Vactor | 12 | 43 | 128 | 3.0 | 1 | 3 | 16 | 5.3 | 0 | 46 | 144 | 3.1 | 1 |
| Rodgers | 12 | 39 | 219 | 5.6 | 2 | 39 | 710 | 18.2 | 7 | 78 | 929 | 11.9 | 9 |
| Olds | 12 | 13 | 80 | 6.2 | 0 | 1 | 19 | 19.0 | 0 | 14 | 99 | 7.1 | 0 |
| Carstens | 12 | 7 | 23 | 3.3 | 0 | 2 | 11 | 5.5 | 0 | 9 | 34 | 3.8 | 0 |
| Hughes | 12 | 7 | 2 | 0.3 | 0 | 3 | 35 | 11,7 | 0 | 10 | 37 | 3,7 | 0 |
| Jones | 12 | 6 | −9 | −1.5 | 0 | | | | | 6 | −9 | −1.5 | 0 |
| Ingles | 12 | 4 | 34 | 8.5 | 0 | 36 | 625 | 17.4 | 8 | 40 | 659 | 16.5 | 8 |
| List | 12 | 2 | 26 | 13.0 | 0 | 23 | 278 | 12.1 | 0 | 25 | 304 | 12.2 | 0 |
| Cox | 12 | | | | | 8 | 83 | 10.4 | 2 | 8 | 83 | 10.4 | 2 |
| Harvey | 12 | | | | | 2 | 17 | 8.5 | 0 | 2 | 17 | 8.5 | 0 |

Scoring

Scoring
| | | Touchdowns | | | | | | | | Kicking | | | | |
| Player | G | Rush | Rec | Int | FR | PR | KR | Oth | Tot | XPM | FGM | 2PM | Sfty | Pts |
|---|---|---|---|---|---|---|---|---|---|---|---|---|---|---|
| Orduna | 12 | 15 | | | | | | | 15 | | | 1 | | 92 |
| Rodgers | 12 | 2 | 7 | | | | | | 9 | | | | | 54 |
| Ingles | 12 | | 8 | | | | | | 8 | | | | | 48 |
| Kinney | 12 | 4 | 1 | | | | | | 5 | | | | | 30 |
| Tagge | 12 | 5 | | | | | | | 5 | | | | | 30 |
| Schneiss | 12 | 2 | 2 | | | | | | 4 | | | | | 24 |
| Brownson | 12 | 4 | | | | | | | 4 | | | | | 24 |
| Cox | 12 | | 2 | | | | | | 2 | | | | | 12 |
| Vactor | 12 | 1 | | | | | | | 1 | | | | | 6 |

== Rankings ==
Ranking movements Legend: ██ Increase in ranking ██ Decrease in ranking — = Not ranked
| | Week | | | | | | | | | | | | | | |
| Poll | Pre | 1 | 2 | 3 | 4 | 5 | 6 | 7 | 8 | 9 | 10 | 11 | 12 | 13 | Final |
|---|---|---|---|---|---|---|---|---|---|---|---|---|---|---|---|
| AP | 9 | 9 | 8 | 6 | 6 | 5 | 4 | 4 | 4 | 4 | 3 | 3 | 3 | 3 | 1 |
| Coaches | — | — | 8 | 6 | 5 | 4 | 4 | 4 | 4 | 4 | 3 | 3 | 3 | 3 | 3 |

== Awards ==
| Award | Name(s) |
|---|---|
| National; Coach of the Year | Bob Devaney |
| All-America; 1st team | Jerry Murtaugh, Bob Newton |
| All-America; 2nd team | Joe Orduna |
| All-America honorable mention | Joe Blahak, Van Brownson, Willie Harper, Guy Ingles, Donnie McGhee, Joe Orduna, Johnny Rodgers, Jerry Tagge, Dave Walline |
| All-America; Sophomores | Joe Blahak, Doug Dumler, Willie Harper, Johnny Rodgers |
| Big Eight; Player of the Year | Jerry Murtaugh |
| Big Eight Sophomore; Lineman of the Year | Willie Harper |
| All-Big Eight; 1st team | Bill Kosch, Donnie McGhee, Jerry Murtaugh, Bob Newton, Joe Orduna, Ed Periard, Johnny Rodgers, Paul Rogers, Dave Walline |
| All-Big Eight honorable mention | Van Brownson, Guy Ingles, Jerry Tagge, Wally Winter |

== 1970 team players in the NFL ==
The 1970 Nebraska Cornhuskers seniors selected in the 1971 NFL draft:

| Player | Position | Round | Pick | Franchise |
|---|---|---|---|---|
| Joe Orduna | RB | 2 | 49 | San Francisco 49ers |
| Bob Newton | T | 3 | 71 | Chicago Bears |
| Paul Rogers | K-DB | 8 | 190 | Pittsburgh Steelers |
| Dan Schneiss | TE | 11 | 261 | Boston Patriots |

The 1970 Nebraska Cornhuskers juniors selected in the following year's 1972 NFL draft:

| Player | Position | Round | Pick | Franchise |
|---|---|---|---|---|
| Jerry Tagge | QB | 1 | 11 | Green Bay Packers |
| Jeff Kinney | RB | 1 | 23 | Kansas City Chiefs |
| Larry Jacobson | DT | 1 | 24 | New York Giants |
| Carl Johnson | T | 5 | 112 | New Orleans Saints |
| Van Brownson | QB | 8 | 204 | Baltimore Colts |
| Keith Wortman | G | 10 | 242 | Green Bay Packers |

The 1970 Nebraska Cornhuskers sophomores selected in the 1973 NFL draft:

| Player | Position | Round | Pick | Franchise |
|---|---|---|---|---|
| Johnny Rodgers | WR | 1 | 25 | San Diego Chargers |
| Willie Harper | LB | 2 | 41 | San Francisco 49ers |
| Monte Johnson | LB | 2 | 49 | Oakland Raiders |
| Bill Olds | RB | 3 | 61 | Baltimore Colts |
| Rich Glover | DT | 3 | 69 | New York Giants |
| Doug Dumler | C | 5 | 108 | New England Patriots |
| Joe Blahak | DB | 8 | 183 | Houston Oilers |
| Bill Janssen | T | 8 | 206 | Pittsburgh Steelers |
| Dave Mason | DB | 10 | 246 | Minnesota Vikings |
| Jerry List | TE | 11 | 283 | Oakland Raiders |

=== NFL and pro players ===
The following 1970 Nebraska players joined a professional team as draftees or free agents.

| Name | Team |
|---|---|
| Joe Blahak | Houston Oilers |
| Doug Dumler | New England Patriots |
| John Dutton | Baltimore Colts |
| Rich Glover | New York Giants |
| Willie Harper | San Francisco 49ers |
| Larry Jacobson | New York Giants |
| Bill Janssen | Charlotte Hornets |
| Carl Johnson | New Orleans Saints |
| Monte Johnson | Oakland Raiders |
| Jeff Kinney | Kansas City Chiefs |
| Brent Longwell | Memphis Southmen |
| Dave Mason | New England Patriots |
| Jerry Murtaugh | New England Patriots |
| Bob Newton | Chicago Bears |
| Bill Olds | Baltimore Colts |
| Joe Orduna | New York Giants |
| Johnny Rodgers | Montreal Alouettes |
| Bob Schmit | Portland Storm |
| Jerry Tagge | Green Bay Packers |
| Frank Vactor | Washington Redskins |
| Daryl White | Detroit Lions |
| Bob Wolfe | Birmingham Americans |
| Keith Wortman | Green Bay Packers |
