= 1971 Oklahoma State Cowboys football team =

American college football season

1971 Oklahoma State Cowboys football
- Conference: Big Eight Conference
- Record: 4–6–1 (2–5 Big 8)
- Head coach: Floyd Gass (3rd season)
- Home stadium: Lewis Field

1971 Big Eight Conference football standings
	Conf.					Overall
Team	W		L		T	W		L		T
No. 1 Nebraska $	7	–	0	–	0	13	–	0	–	0
No. 2 Oklahoma	6	–	1	–	0	11	–	1	–	0
No. 3 Colorado	5	–	2	–	0	10	–	2	–	0
Iowa State	4	–	3	–	0	8	–	4	–	0
Kansas State	2	–	5	–	0	5	–	6	–	0
Oklahoma State	2	–	5	–	0	4	–	6	–	1
Kansas	2	–	5	–	0	4	–	7	–	0
Missouri	0	–	7	–	0	1	–	10	–	0
$ – Conference champion; Rankings from AP Poll

The 1971 Oklahoma State Cowboys football team represented Oklahoma State University in the Big Eight Conference during the 1971 NCAA University Division football season. In their third and final season under head coach Floyd Gass, the Cowboys compiled a 4–6–1 record (2–5 against conference opponents), tied for fifth place in the conference, and were outscored by opponents by a combined total of 322 to 184.

The team's statistical leaders included Bobby Cole with 631 rushing yards, Tony Pounds with 792 passing yards, and Dick Graham with 631 receiving yards.

The team played its home games at Lewis Field in Stillwater, Oklahoma. It was the last year the Cowboys played their home games on natural grass; AstroTurf was installed as part of a massive stadium renovation during the offseason, and the facility, now known as Boone-Pickens Stadium, has sported artificial turf since.

== Schedule ==
Date	Opponent	Site	Result	Attendance	Source
September 11	Mississippi State*	Lewis Field; Stillwater, OK	W 26–7	31,500	
September 18	at No. 6 Arkansas*	War Memorial Stadium; Little Rock, AR	L 10–31	54,176	
September 25	Virginia Tech*	Lewis Field; Stillwater, OK	W 24–16	23,500	
October 9	at TCU*	Amon G. Carter Stadium; Fort Worth, TX	T 14–14	21,232	
October 16	at Missouri	Memorial Stadium; Columbia, MO	W 37–16	48,835	
October 23	No. 1 Nebraska	Lewis Field; Stillwater, OK	L 13–41	37,000	
October 30	at Kansas	Memorial Stadium; Lawrence, KS	W 17–10	25,000	
November 6	Kansas State^{†}	Lewis Field; Stillwater, OK	L 23–35	35,500	
November 13	at No. 12 Colorado	Folsom Field; Boulder, CO	L 6–40	40,211	
November 20	at Iowa State	Clyde Williams Field; Ames, IA	L 0–54	21,000	
December 4	No. 3 Oklahoma	Lewis Field; Stillwater, OK (Bedlam Series)	L 14–58	37,500	
*Non-conference game; ^{†}Homecoming; Rankings from AP Poll released prior to the game

== After the season ==
The 1972 NFL draft was held on February 1–2, 1972. The following Cowboy was selected.

Round	Pick	Player	Position	NFL club
17	424	Dick Graham	Wide receiver	New England Patriots
