= Bill Olds =

American football player (born 1951)

No. 38, 39
- Position: Running back

Personal information
- Born: February 21, 1951 (age 75); Kansas City, Kansas, U.S.
- Listed height: 6 ft 1 in (1.85 m)
- Listed weight: 224 lb (102 kg)

Career information
- High school: Sumner (Kansas City)
- College: Nebraska
- NFL draft: 1973: 3rd round, 61st overall pick

Career history
- Baltimore Colts (1973–1975); Seattle Seahawks (1976); Philadelphia Eagles (1976)

Awards and highlights
- 2× National champion (1970, 1971)

Career NFL statistics
- Rushing attempts-yards: 287-985
- Receptions-yards: 62-372
- Touchdowns: 10
- Stats at Pro Football Reference

William Henry Olds (born February 21, 1951) is an American former professional football player who was a running back for four seasons in the National Football League (NFL). He played college football for the Nebraska Cornhuskers and was selected by the Baltimore Colts in the third round of the 1973 NFL draft with the 61st overall pick. He played in the NFL for the Colts, Seattle Seahawks, and Philadelphia Eagles.

== Nebraska Cornhuskers ==
Olds graduated from high school in 1969 and played college football for the Nebraska Cornhuskers under head coach Bob Devaney, with future head coach Tom Osborne as offensive coordinator. He was the fullback in the I formation, the lead blocker for tailbacks Jeff Kinney and Johnny Rodgers, the 1972 Heisman Trophy winner. Nebraska won national championships in 1970 and 1971, and a third straight Orange Bowl following the 1972 season to finish at fourth in the AP poll. The Huskers went 33–2–2 (.919) in those three seasons (1970–72).
