= 1971 Astro-Bluebonnet Bowl =

Colorado Buffaloes	Houston Cougars
(9–2)	(9–2)
Big Eight	Independent
29	17
Head coach: Eddie Crowder	Head coach: Bill Yeoman
AP / Coaches; 7 / 7	AP / Coaches; 15 / 14
	1	2	3	4	Total
Colorado	7	16	0	6	29
Houston	14	0	3	0	17
- Date: December 31, 1971
- Season: 1971
- Stadium: Astrodome
- Location: Houston, Texas
- Attendance: 54,720

United States TV coverage
- Network: ABC

The 1971 Astro-Bluebonnet Bowl was a college football bowl game that featured the Colorado Buffaloes and the Houston Cougars.

== Background ==
Colorado finished third in the Big Eight Conference. This their fourth bowl game appearance in five seasons and their first Bluebonnet Bowl since 1967. As for the Cougars, this was their second Astro-Bluebonnet Bowl in three seasons.

== Game summary ==
Robert Newhouse had 35 carries for 168 yards for Houston. Charlie Davis had 202 yards on 37 carries for Colorado.

=== Scoring summary ===
- Colorado – Charlie Davis 27-yard touchdown run (Dean kick) – 11:24 remaining in the 1st quarter
- Houston – Robert Newhouse 2-yard touchdown run (Terrell kick) – 5:22 remaining in the 1st quarter
- Houston – Robert Newhouse 5-yard touchdown run (Terrell kick) – 1:14 remaining in the 1st quarter
- Colorado – Larry Brunson 5-pass from Ken Johnson (kick failed) – 13:20 remaining in the 2nd quarter
- Colorado – Dean 32 yard field goal – 5:03 remaining in the 2nd quarter
- Colorado – Charlie Davis 1 yard-touchdown run (Dean kick) – 1:13 remaining in the 2nd quarter
- Houston – Ricky Terrell 29 yard-field goal – 2:16 remaining in the 3rd quarter
- Colorado – Ken Johnson 1-yard touchdown run (pass failed) – 3:48 remaining in the 4th quarter

== Aftermath ==
The Buffaloes finished third in the final AP Poll. They went to three more bowl games in the decade, including an Astro-Bluebonnet Bowl appearance in 1975. The Cougars (who finished 17th in the final poll) returned to the Astro-Bluebonnet Bowl in 1973, en route to four more bowls in the decade.

== Statistics ==
Statistics	Houston	Colorado
First downs	19	24
Rushing yards	219	333
Passing yards	173	62
Total offense	392	398
Passing (C–A–I)	11–25–1	7–17–1
Fumbles–lost	2–2	4–0
Penalties–yards	2–47	7–52
Punts–average	2–37.5	3–32.0
