= Monte Johnson =

American football player (born 1951)

No. 58
- Position: Linebacker

Personal information
- Born: October 26, 1951 (age 75); Denver, Colorado, U.S.
- Listed height: 6 ft 4 in (1.93 m)
- Listed weight: 239 lb (108 kg)

Career information
- High school: Lincoln (Bloomington, Minnesota)
- College: Nebraska
- NFL draft: 1973: 2nd round, 49th overall pick

Career history
- Oakland Raiders (1973–1980)

Awards and highlights
- 2× Super Bowl champion (XI, XV); 2× National champion (1970, 1971); Nebraska Football Hall of Fame (2024)

Career NFL statistics
- Sacks: 10
- Interceptions: 11
- Stats at Pro Football Reference

Monte C. Johnson (born October 26, 1951) is an American former professional football player for the Oakland Raiders of the National Football League (NFL). Johnson, who never started in college, was selected by the Raiders during the second round of the 1973 NFL draft as the 49th player selected overall. Johnson played college football for the Nebraska Cornhuskers and won two national championships with Nebraska, and two Super Bowls (XI XV) with the Raiders. Johnson was the starting middle linebacker in Super Bowl XI when the Raiders defeated the Vikings, was injured in the 1980 season, and as a result did not play in Super Bowl XV, when the Raiders defeated the Eagles. Johnson considers the 1977 AFC Divisional playoff game against the Baltimore Colts, a game known as, "Ghost to the Post", to be his greatest game. Johnson finished the game, which went to double overtime, with 22 tackles despite suffering a broken vertebra during regulation. Johnson became the starting middle linebacker at the beginning of 1975 season. Prior to that his contribution was the backup linebacker at all positions; he had significant playing time in the Raiders 3-4 defense as a blitzing/pass rushing linebacker and pass coverage. During Johnson's eight-year career, the Raiders played or was a member of the team in 11 playoff games including six AFC Championship games and two Super Bowls. Johnson retired from professional football in 1981, after eight seasons in Oakland, as a result of a career-ending knee injury he incurred early in the 1980 season.
