= 1970 Liberty Bowl =

American college football game

- 12th Liberty Bowl
Colorado Buffaloes	Tulane Green Wave
(6–4)	(7–4)
Big Eight	Independent
3	17
Head coach: Eddie Crowder	Head coach: Jim Pittman
AP / Coaches; NR / 16
	1	2	3	4	Total
Colorado	0	3	0	0	3
Tulane	3	0	7	7	17
- Date: December 12, 1970
- Season: 1970
- Stadium: Memphis Memorial Stadium
- Location: Memphis, Tennessee
- MVP: David Abercrombie, Tulane TB
- Attendance: 44,640

United States TV coverage
- Network: ABC

The 1970 Liberty Bowl, part of the 1970 bowl game season, took place on December 12, 1970, at Memphis Memorial Stadium in Memphis, Tennessee. The competing teams in the 12th edition of the Liberty Bowl were the Tulane Green Wave, competing as an independent, and the Colorado Buffaloes, representing the Big Eight Conference. Tulane won the game, 17–3. This was the last Liberty Bowl played on a Saturday until the 1978 edition.

== Teams ==
=== Colorado ===
Entering the 1970 bowl season, Colorado finished the regular season with a record of 6–4. Following the completion of their regular season, the Buffaloes accepted a bid to play in the Liberty Bowl for the second consecutive year. The appearance in the game marked Colorado's second in the Liberty Bowl and their sixth overall bowl appearance.

=== Tulane ===
Entering the 1970 bowl season, Tulane finished the regular season with a record of 7–4. Following a 26–14 defeat to the rival LSU Tigers, the Green Wave accepted a bid to play in the Liberty Bowl. The appearance in the game marked Tulane's first since the 1940 Sugar Bowl and their fourth overall bowl appearance.

== Game summary ==
In an early defensive struggle, Tulane threatened to score first after Rick Kingrea intercepted a Paul Arendt pass and returned it to the Colorado six-yard line. Four plays later the Green Wave scored first on a 19-yard Lee Gibson field goal. Colorado evened the score 3–3 in the second quarter on a 32-yard David Haney field goal to cap a 15-play, 63-yard drive. In the second half the Green Wave scored touchdowns on a pair of David Abercrombie runs to win the game 17–3. For his 124 yards rushing and two touchdowns, Abercrombie was named the game's Most Valuable Player.

Scoring summary

Quarter	Time	Drive			Team	Scoring information	Score	
Quarter	Time	Plays	Yards	TOP	Team	Scoring information	Colorado	Tulane
1					Tulane	19-yard field goal by Lee Gibson	0	3
2	7:56	15	63		Colorado	32-yard field goal by David Haney	3	3
3	13:18	5	30		Tulane	David Abercrombie 5-yard touchdown run, Lee Gibson kick good	3	10
4	8:05	11	49		Tulane	David Abercrombie 4-yard touchdown run, Lee Gibson kick good	3	17
"TOP" = time of possession. For other American football terms, see Glossary of American football.							3	17
