= John Watson (American football) =

American football player (1949–2022)

No. 67
- Positions: Guard, tackle, center

Personal information
- Born: January 11, 1949; Palo Alto, California, U.S.
- Died: July 2, 2022 (aged 73)
- Listed height: 6 ft 4 in (1.93 m)
- Listed weight: 249 lb (113 kg)

Career information
- High school: McLain (OK)
- College: Oklahoma
- NFL draft: 1971: 7th round, 179th overall pick

Career history
- San Francisco 49ers (1971–1976); New Orleans Saints (1977–1979)

Career NFL statistics
- Games played: 95
- Games started: 51
- Stats at Pro Football Reference

Johnny Ace Watson (January 11, 1949 – July 2, 2022) was an American professional football offensive lineman who played nine seasons in the NFL for the San Francisco 49ers and New Orleans Saints. He was drafted by the San Francisco 49ers in the 7th round (179th overall) of the 1971 NFL Draft. He played college football at the University of Oklahoma. Born in Palo Alto, California, Watson died of Alzheimer's at age 73 in Oklahoma City, Oklahoma.
