= Jeff Allen (defensive back, born 1948) =

American football player (born 1948)

No. 37
- Position: Defensive back / running back

Personal information
- Born: August 27, 1948 (age 78); Chicago, Illinois, U.S.
- Listed height: 5 ft 11 in (1.80 m)
- Listed weight: 190 lb (86 kg)

Career information
- High school: Wendell Phillips Academy (Chicago)
- College: Central (IA) (1967); Iowa State (1968–1970)
- NFL draft: 1971: 13th round, 329th overall pick

Career history
- St. Louis Cardinals (1971–1973); Lake County Rifles (1973)

Career NFL statistics
- Games played: 1
- Stats at Pro Football Reference

Jeffery Allen (born August 27, 1948) is an American former professional football player who was a running back and defensive back for one season with the St. Louis Cardinals of the National Football League (NFL). He played college football for the Central Dutch and Iowa State Cyclones and was selected in the 13th round of the 1971 NFL draft by the Cardinals. He was injured for most of his rookie season, only playing one game, and missed the following season due to injury before being released early in 1973.

== Early life and education ==
Allen was born on August 27, 1948, in Chicago, Illinois. He attended Wendell Phillips Academy High School in Chicago and had his number (22) retired upon graduation. In addition to playing football for the school, Allen also was a member of their basketball team. He attended Central College in Iowa for one year, 1967, being a top halfback for their football team, with performances that included posting 284 yards in one game.

Allen transferred to play at Iowa State University in 1968, playing wingback and being the Cyclones' second wide receiver on the depth chart, as well as one of their return specialists. In the first game of the season, he had the team's longest touchdown of the game, scoring from 32-yards out on a run. His "ability to scramble through small holes" earned him the nickname "Rat" from his teammates.

Allen finished his first season with the Cyclones as their leading touchdown scorer with 11 and also led the nation and set a Big 8 Conference record with 21 kickoff returns for 599 yards, being named the conference's sophomore of the year. Offensively, he ran the ball 57 times for 309 yards and caught 17 passes for 277 yards. He started 16 consecutive games for the team over the 1968 and 1969 seasons before missing a game in November 1969 against Oklahoma due to injury. He totaled 24 carries for 59 yards and 17 receptions for 149 yards in the 1969 season. As a senior in 1970, Allen switched to playing cornerback. He finished his three-year stint at Iowa State as their all-time leading kick returner with 1,549 yards.

== Professional career ==
Allen was selected in the 13th round (329th overall) of the 1971 NFL draft by the St. Louis Cardinals. While many players from Iowa State have been selected in the draft, he became one of just two alumni of Central College to ever be chosen; the other one, Vern Den Herder, was also a 1971 draft pick. He signed his rookie contract at the end of June. On August 3, he was placed on the reserve list after catching an illness while in training camp. After recovering, Allen was activated on November 2 and sent to the taxi squad.

Allen was activated from the taxi squad for the Cardinals' week 14 game against the Dallas Cowboys. Although a cornerback, Allen was called up to play running back, his original position in college, due to injuries to other players at the position. He made his NFL debut against Dallas, but recorded no statistics in the 31–12 loss. This would be the only game of his career, as he subsequently suffered a leg injury, missed the entire 1972 season after being placed on injured reserve, and was released in July 1973 after failing a physical. After his release from the NFL, Allen went on to play minor league football with the Lake County Rifles.
