= 1970 Colorado Buffaloes football team =

American college football season

1970 Colorado Buffaloes football

Liberty Bowl, L 3–17 vs. Tulane
- Conference: Big Eight Conference

Ranking
- Coaches: No. 16
- Record: 6–5 (3–4 Big 8)
- Head coach: Eddie Crowder (8th season)
- Offensive coordinator: Chet Franklin (2nd season)
- Offensive scheme: Switching T / Slot-I; Triple option
- Defensive coordinator: Don James (3rd season)
- Base defense: 4–3
- MVP: Don Popplewell
- Captains: Phil Irwin; Don Popplewell
- Home stadium: Folsom Field

1970 Big Eight Conference football standings
	Conf.					Overall
Team	W		L		T	W		L		T
No. 1 Nebraska $	7	–	0	–	0	11	–	0	–	1
No. 20 Oklahoma	5	–	2	–	0	7	–	4	–	1
Kansas State	5	–	2	–	0	6	–	5	–	0
Missouri	3	–	4	–	0	5	–	6	–	0
Colorado	3	–	4	–	0	6	–	5	–	0
Kansas	2	–	5	–	0	5	–	6	–	0
Oklahoma State	2	–	5	–	0	4	–	7	–	0
Iowa State	1	–	6	–	0	5	–	6	–	0
$ – Conference champion; Rankings from AP Poll

The 1970 Colorado Buffaloes football team represented the University of Colorado in the Big Eight Conference during the 1970 NCAA University Division football season. Led by eighth-year head coach Eddie Crowder, the Buffaloes were 6–4 in the regular season (3–4 in Big 8, fourth), and played their home games on campus at Folsom Field in Boulder, Colorado.

In a nationally televised game on ABC, No. 18 Colorado upset fourth-ranked Penn State 41–13 in Boulder in late September, breaking a 23-game winning (and 31-game undefeated) streak. The Buffaloes moved up to eighth in the AP poll, but were upset the next week by a point at Kansas State, led by quarterback Lynn Dickey.

Invited to the Liberty Bowl in Memphis, Tennessee, the No. 19 Buffaloes were upset by Tulane to finish at 6–5.

In December, CU defensive coordinator Don James became the head coach at Kent State in Ohio; four years later he was hired at Washington in Seattle. He led the Huskies for eighteen seasons, including a shared national championship in 1991.

== Schedule ==
Date	Time	Opponent	Rank	Site	TV	Result	Attendance	Source
September 19		at Indiana*		Seventeenth Street Stadium; Bloomington, IN		W 16–9	42,471	
September 26		No. 4 Penn State*	No. 18	Folsom Field; Boulder, CO	ABC	W 41–13	42,850	
October 3		at Kansas State	No. 8	KSU Stadium; Manhattan, KS (rivalry)		L 20–21	40,200	
October 10	1:30 p.m.	Iowa State	No. 17	Folsom Field; Boulder, CO		W 61–10	40,840	
October 17		Oklahoma^{†}	No. 13	Folsom Field; Boulder, CO		L 15–23	47,700	
October 24		Missouri	No. 19	Memorial Stadium; Columbia, MO		L 16–30	57,000	
October 31		No. 4 Nebraska		Folsom Field; Boulder, CO (rivalry)	ABC	L 13–29	50,881	
November 7		Kansas		Folsom Field; Boulder, CO		W 45–29	37,250	
November 14		at Oklahoma State		Lewis Field; Stillwater, OK		W 30–6	18,000	
November 21	1:00 p.m.	at No. 10 Air Force*		Falcon Stadium; Colorado Springs, CO		W 49–19	45,447	
December 12		vs. Tulane*		Memphis Memorial Stadium; Memphis, TN (Liberty Bowl)	ABC	L 3–17	44,640	
*Non-conference game; ^{†}Homecoming; Rankings from AP Poll released prior to the game; All times are in Mountain time

== Roster ==
1970 Colorado Buffaloes football team roster
Players
Coaches
Offense

Pos.	#	Name	Class
SE	23	Cliff Branch	Jr
QB	10	Jim Bratten
OL		Dennis Havig
TB	28	Jon Keyworth	So
TB	32	John Tarver	Jr
FB	41	Ward Walsh	Sr

Defense

Pos.	#	Name	Class
DB	16	Cullen Bryant
S	15	Jim Cooch
CB	29	Pat Murphy
LB	89	Rick Ogle
DE	88	Herb Orvis	Jr
S, P	12	John Stearns	So

Special teams

Pos.	#	Name	Class

Head coach

- Eddie Crowder (8th year)

Coordinators/assistant coaches

- Chet Franklin (OC)
- Don James (DC)

Legend

- (C) Team captain
- (S) Suspended
- (I) Ineligible
- Injured
- Redshirt

Roster
