= Floyd Gass =

American football player, coach, and administrator (1927–2006)

Biographical details
- Born: January 31, 1927; Hominy, Oklahoma, U.S.
- Died: March 3, 2006 (aged 79)

Coaching career (HC unless noted)

Football
- 1955–1960: Austin (offensive assistant)
- 1961–1968: Austin
- 1969–1971: Oklahoma State

Basketball
- 1955–1962: Austin

Administrative career (AD unless noted)
- 1958–1969: Austin
- 1971–1978: Oklahoma State

Head coaching record
- Overall: 56–46–2 (football); 71–80 (basketball)

Accomplishments and honors

Awards
- Big Eight Coach of the Year (1969)

Floyd Gass (January 31, 1927 – March 3, 2006) was an American football and basketball player, coach, and college athletics administrator. He served as the head football coach at Austin College from 1961 to 1968, having previously been offensive coordinator, and at Oklahoma State University–Stillwater from 1969 to 1971, compiling a career college football record of 56–46–2. He was voted the Big Eight Conference Coach of the Year in 1969. His record was 13–18–1 in his three seasons at Oklahoma State. Gass was also the head basketball coach at Austin College from 1955 to 1962, tallying a mark of 71–80, and served as athletic director. He was an alumnus of Oklahoma State, and played football and basketball while attending the university. Gass was one of three head football coaches at Oklahoma State to have played for Oklahoma State, along with Jim Lookabaugh and current head coach Mike Gundy. Gass served as athletics director at OSU from 1971 through 1978, when he left OSU to pursue other business opportunities. Gass died on March 3, 2006, at the age of 79.

== Head coaching record ==
=== Football ===
Year	Team	Overall	Conference	Standing	NAIA^{#}
Austin Kangaroos (NAIA independent) (1961–1968)
1961	Austin	2–7			
1962	Austin	5–4			
1963	Austin	3–5–1			
1964	Austin	6–3			
1965	Austin	7–2			
1966	Austin	6–3			
1967	Austin	6–3			
1968	Austin	8–1			16
Austin:		43–28–1			
Oklahoma State Cowboys (Big Eight Conference) (1969–1971)
1969	Oklahoma State	5–5	3–4	T–5th	
1970	Oklahoma State	4–7	2–5	T–6th	
1971	Oklahoma State	4–6–1	2–5	T–5th	
Oklahoma State:		13–18–1	7–14		
Total:		56–46–2			
