= 1969 Iowa State Cyclones football team =

American college football season

1969 Iowa State Cyclones football
- Conference: Big Eight Conference
- Record: 3–7 (1–6 Big 8)
- Head coach: Johnny Majors (2nd season)
- Captains: Jerry Fiat; Fred Jones
- Home stadium: Clyde Williams Field

1969 Big Eight Conference football standings
	Conf.					Overall
Team	W		L		T	W		L		T
No. 6 Missouri +	6	–	1	–	0	9	–	2	–	0
No. 11 Nebraska +	6	–	1	–	0	9	–	2	–	0
No. 16 Colorado	5	–	2	–	0	8	–	3	–	0
Oklahoma	4	–	3	–	0	6	–	4	–	0
Kansas State	3	–	4	–	0	5	–	5	–	0
Oklahoma State	3	–	4	–	0	5	–	5	–	0
Iowa State	1	–	6	–	0	3	–	7	–	0
Kansas	0	–	7	–	0	1	–	9	–	0
+ – Conference co-champions; Rankings from AP Poll

The 1969 Iowa State Cyclones football team represented Iowa State University in the Big Eight Conference during the 1969 NCAA University Division football season. In their second year under head coach Johnny Majors, the Cyclones compiled a 3–7 record (1–6 against conference opponents), finished in seventh place in the conference, and were outscored by opponents by a combined total of 231 to 152. They played their home games at Clyde Williams Field in Ames, Iowa.

Jerry Fiat and Fred Jones were the team captains. Joe Avezzano coached the freshman team.

== Schedule ==
Date	Time	Opponent	Site	Result	Attendance	Source
September 20	12:30 pm	at Syracuse*	Archbold Stadium; Syracuse, NY	L 13–14	30,491	
September 27	1:30 pm	BYU*	Clyde Williams Field; Ames, IA	W 10–0	28,232	
October 4	1:30 pm	at Illinois*	Memorial Stadium; Champaign, IL	W 48–20	37,663	
October 11	1:30 pm	Colorado	Clyde Williams Field; Ames, IA	L 0–14	29,000	
October 18	1:30 pm	at Kansas State	KSU Stadium; Manhattan, KS (rivalry)	L 7–34	29,000	
October 25	1:30 pm	Kansas	Clyde Williams Field; Ames, IA	W 44–20	27,000	
November 1	1:30 pm	at Oklahoma	Oklahoma Memorial Stadium; Norman, OK	L 14–37	54,500	
November 8	1:30 pm	at No. 20 Nebraska	Memorial Stadium; Lincoln, NE (rivalry)	L 3–17	67,107	
November 15	1:30 pm	No. 8 Missouri	Clyde Williams Field; Ames, IA (rivalry)	L 13–40	21,000	
November 22	1:30 pm	Oklahoma State	Clyde Williams Field; Ames, IA	L 0–35	10,000	
*Non-conference game; Rankings from AP Poll released prior to the game; All times are in Central time

== Roster ==
1969 Iowa State Cyclones football team roster
Players
Coaches
Offense

Pos.	#	Name	Class
WR	85	Otto Stowe	Jr
FB		Jock Johnson
QB		Obert Tisdale

Defense

Pos.	#	Name	Class
S	13	Dave McCurry	Fr

Special teams

Pos.	#	Name	Class

Head coach

- Johnny Majors

Coordinators/assistant coaches

- Joe Avezzano

Legend

- (C) Team captain
- (S) Suspended
- (I) Ineligible
- Injured
- Redshirt
