= Anthony Malbrough =

American gridiron football player (born 1976)

Profile
- Position: Defensive back

Personal information
- Born: December 9, 1976 (age 49); Beaumont, Texas, U.S.
- Listed height: 5 ft 9 in (1.75 m)
- Listed weight: 180 lb (82 kg)

Career information
- College: Texas Tech
- NFL draft: 2000: 5th round, 130th overall pick

Career history
- 2000: Cleveland Browns
- 2001: Barcelona Dragons
- 2002: Houston Texans*
- 2002–2003: Calgary Stampeders
- 2004: Ottawa Renegades
- 2005: Calgary Stampeders
- 2005–2008: Winnipeg Blue Bombers
- 2009: Edmonton Eskimos
- * Offseason or practice squad member only

Awards and highlights
- 1999 J.T. King Award; 2001 NFL Europe Defensive Player of the Week
- Stats at Pro Football Reference
- Stats at CFL.ca (archive)

Anthony Malbrough (born December 9, 1976) is an American former professional football defensive back. He was selected by the Cleveland Browns in the fifth round of the 2000 NFL draft. He played college football for the Texas Tech Red Raiders.

Malbrough has been a member of the Barcelona Dragons, Calgary Stampeders, Ottawa Renegades, Winnipeg Blue Bombers, and Edmonton Eskimos.

== College career ==
Malbrough's college career at Texas Tech included his amassing 42 tackles, 11 pass deflections, 1 interception and 1 quarterback pressure in his senior year. In his junior year, he received the J.T King Award for Most Improved Player.

== Professional career ==
The National Football League's Cleveland Browns selected Malbrough in the 2000 NFL draft. That season, he registered 13 tackles.

In 2001, Malbrough played for the Barcelona Dragons of the NFL Europe. In week 2, he had 3 interceptions, returned 2 of them for touchdowns (76 and 65 yards) and he received the NFL Europe Defensive Player of the Week honor.

In 2002, Malbrough joined the Canadian Football League. He most recently played for the Winnipeg Blue Bombers.
