= 1969 Kansas Jayhawks football team =

American college football season

1969 Kansas Jayhawks football
- Conference: Big Eight Conference
- Record: 1–9 (0–7 Big 8)
- Head coach: Pepper Rodgers (3rd season)
- Captain: Emery Hicks
- Home stadium: Memorial Stadium

1969 Big Eight Conference football standings
| | Conf. | | | | | Overall |
| Team | W | | L | | T | W | | L | | T |
|---|---|---|---|---|---|---|---|---|---|---|
| No. 6 Missouri + | 6 | – | 1 | – | 0 | 9 | – | 2 | – | 0 |
| No. 11 Nebraska + | 6 | – | 1 | – | 0 | 9 | – | 2 | – | 0 |
| No. 16 Colorado | 5 | – | 2 | – | 0 | 8 | – | 3 | – | 0 |
| Oklahoma | 4 | – | 3 | – | 0 | 6 | – | 4 | – | 0 |
| Kansas State | 3 | – | 4 | – | 0 | 5 | – | 5 | – | 0 |
| Oklahoma State | 3 | – | 4 | – | 0 | 5 | – | 5 | – | 0 |
| Iowa State | 1 | – | 6 | – | 0 | 3 | – | 7 | – | 0 |
| Kansas | 0 | – | 7 | – | 0 | 1 | – | 9 | – | 0 |
+ – Conference co-champions; Rankings from AP Poll

The 1969 Kansas Jayhawks football team represented the University of Kansas in the Big Eight Conference during the 1969 NCAA University Division football season. In their third season under head coach Pepper Rodgers, the Jayhawks compiled an overall record of 1–9 record with a mark of 0–7 in conference play, placing last in the Big 8, and were outscored 290 to 176. Kansas played home games on campus at Memorial Stadium in Lawrence, Kansas.

In the previous season, Kansas tied Oklahoma for the Big Eight championship, the Jayhawks' most recent conference title as of 2023. They met undefeated Penn State in the Orange Bowl, but lost by a point, 15–14. Kansas was hit hard by graduation, including quarterback Bobby Douglass and defensive end John Zook, who were NFL starters as rookies in 1969 with the Chicago Bears and Atlanta Falcons, respectively.

Rival Missouri wrapped up the Big Eight championship with a 69–21 rout at Lawrence in the last game played on natural grass at Memorial Stadium. Through 2025, it is Missouri football's most recent conference title.

The team's statistical leaders included Phil Basler with 746 passing yards, John Riggins with 662 rushing yards, and John Mosier with 339 receiving yards. Emery Hicks was the team captain.

== Schedule ==
| Date | Opponent | Site | Result | Attendance | Source |
|---|---|---|---|---|---|
| September 20 | at Texas Tech* | Jones Stadium; Lubbock, TX | L 22–38 | 43,201–42,250 | |
| September 27 | Syracuse* | Memorial Stadium; Lawrence, KS | W 13–0 | 44,500 | |
| October 4 | at New Mexico* | University Stadium; Albuquerque, NM | L 7–16 | 13,338 | |
| October 11 | Kansas State | Memorial Stadium; Lawrence, KS (rivalry) | L 22–26 | 51,000 | |
| October 18 | at Nebraska | Memorial Stadium; Lincoln, NE (rivalry) | L 17–21 | 63,223–66,667 | |
| October 25 | at Iowa State | Clyde Williams Field; Ames, IA | L 20–44 | 27,000 | |
| November 1 | Oklahoma State | Memorial Stadium; Lawrence, KS | L 25–28 | 40,000 | |
| November 8 | Colorado^{†} | Memorial Stadium; Lawrence, KS | L 14–17 | 37,000 | |
| November 15 | at Oklahoma | Oklahoma Memorial Stadium; Norman, OK | L 15–31 | 59,128 | |
| November 22 | No. 7 Missouri | Memorial Stadium; Lawrence, KS (Border War) | L 21–69 | 50,500 | |
*Non-conference game; ^{†}Homecoming; Rankings from AP Poll released prior to the game

== Roster ==
1969 Kansas Jayhawks football team roster
Players
Coaches
Offense

| Pos. | # | Name | Class |
|---|---|---|---|
| OT | 70 | Larry Brown | Jr |
| WR | 33 | Ron Jessie | Jr |
| OT | 78 | Steve Lawson | Jr |
| RB | 32 | John Riggins | Jr |

Defense

| Pos. | # | Name | Class |
|---|---|---|---|
| DT | 71 | Jim Bailey | Sr |
| LB | 60 | Emery Hicks | Sr |

Special teams

| Pos. | # | Name | Class |
|---|---|---|---|
| K | 100 | Bill Bell | Sr |

Head coach

- Pepper Rodgers (3rd year)

Coordinators/assistant coaches

Legend

- (C) Team captain
- (S) Suspended
- (I) Ineligible
- Injured
- Redshirt
