= 1969 Sun Bowl =

American college football game

- 36th edition
Georgia Bulldogs	Nebraska Cornhuskers
(5–4–1)	(8–2)
SEC	Big Eight
6	45
Head coach: Vince Dooley	Head coach: Bob Devaney
	AP / Coaches; 14 / 12
	1	2	3	4	Total
Georgia	0	0	0	6	6
Nebraska	18	0	14	13	45
- Date: December 20, 1969
- Season: 1969
- Stadium: Sun Bowl
- Location: El Paso, Texas
- MVP: Paul Rogers (Nebraska K)
- Favorite: Nebraska by 7 points
- Referee: Vance Carlson (Big Eight; split crew: Big Eight, SEC)
- Attendance: 31,176

United States TV coverage
- Network: CBS
- Announcers: Frank Glieber, Don Perkins

The 1969 Sun Bowl was the 36th edition of the college football bowl game, played at the Sun Bowl in El Paso, Texas, on Saturday, December 20. It featured the Georgia Bulldogs of the Southeastern Conference and the fourteenth-ranked Nebraska Cornhuskers of the Big Eight Conference.

== Teams ==
=== Georgia ===
Georgia was sixth in the Southeastern Conference; after a 5–1 start, the Bulldogs were winless in their last four games to finish the regular season at 5–4–1. It was their second appearance in the Sun Bowl; they won five years earlier.

=== Nebraska ===
The Cornhuskers finished as co-champions of the Big Eight Conference with Missouri after losing to them on October 11. While Missouri went to the Orange Bowl, Nebraska made its first appearance in the Sun Bowl.

== Game summary ==
Ultimately, a favorable wind for one team and a long running quarter proved to be the outlines for victory. Nebraska's Paul Rogers kicked four field goals in the first quarter (50, 32, 42, 37) while also scoring a touchdown run by Jeff Kinney to make it 18–0 by the end of the first quarter. It was later determined by Sun Bowl officials that the first quarter had possibly run too long, in part due to a scoreclock malfunction.

While Georgia held the Huskers in the second quarter, Nebraska took back control in the third on two touchdowns, one from a Mike Green touchdown reception from Van Brownson, and the other on a Brownson touchdown run. Dan Schneiss made it 38–0 in the fourth on a touchdown plunge of his own. Paul Gilbert scored on a 6-yard touchdown run to get Georgia on the scoreboard. Reserve quarterback Jerry Tagge made the final score 45–6 on his 2-yard touchdown run. For his kicking efforts, Rogers was named MVP. The Huskers forced eight Georgia turnovers: two fumbles and six interceptions.

Nebraska finished 9–2 and climbed to eleventh in the final AP poll; Georgia fell to 5–5–1.

== Scoring ==
=== First quarter ===
- Nebraska – Field goal, Paul Rogers 50
- Nebraska – Field goal, Rogers 32
- Nebraska – Jeff Kinney 10 run (pass failed)
- Nebraska – Field goal, Rogers 42
- Nebraska – Field goal, Rogers 37

=== Second quarter ===
No scoring

=== Third quarter ===
- Nebraska – Mike Green 7 pass from Van Brownson (Rogers kick)
- Nebraska – Brownson 1 run (Rogers kick)

=== Fourth quarter ===
- Nebraska – Dan Schneiss 1 run (kick failed)
- Georgia – Paul Gilbert 6 run (kick failed)
- Nebraska – Jerry Tagge 2 run (Rogers kick)

== Statistics ==
Statistics	Georgia	Nebraska
First downs	11	17
Rushing yards	55	190
Passing yards	130	165
Passes	11–35–6	18–35–2
Total yards	185	355
Return yardage	86	34
Fumbles–lost	2–2	1–0
Turnovers by	8	2
Punts–average	10–42.2	7–35.6
Penalties–yards	3–31	6–50

== Aftermath ==
Nebraska won national championships in the next two seasons and this was the first of six straight bowl wins, the last five in major bowls. The Huskers returned to the Sun Bowl in 1980 and Georgia in 1985.

The Bulldogs and Cornhuskers did not meet again until the 2013 Capital One Bowl.
