= 1969 Nebraska Cornhuskers football team =

American college football season

1969 Nebraska Cornhuskers football

Big Eight co-champion Sun Bowl champion

Sun Bowl, W 45–6 vs. Georgia
- Conference: Big Eight Conference

Ranking
- Coaches: No. 12
- AP: No. 11
- Record: 9–2 (6–1 Big Eight)
- Head coach: Bob Devaney (8th season)
- Offensive coordinator: Tom Osborne (1st season)
- Offensive scheme: I formation
- Defensive coordinator: Monte Kiffin (1st season)
- Base defense: 5–2
- Home stadium: Memorial Stadium

1969 Big Eight Conference football standings
	Conf.					Overall
Team	W		L		T	W		L		T
No. 6 Missouri +	6	–	1	–	0	9	–	2	–	0
No. 11 Nebraska +	6	–	1	–	0	9	–	2	–	0
No. 16 Colorado	5	–	2	–	0	8	–	3	–	0
Oklahoma	4	–	3	–	0	6	–	4	–	0
Kansas State	3	–	4	–	0	5	–	5	–	0
Oklahoma State	3	–	4	–	0	5	–	5	–	0
Iowa State	1	–	6	–	0	3	–	7	–	0
Kansas	0	–	7	–	0	1	–	9	–	0
+ – Conference co-champions; Rankings from AP Poll

The 1969 Nebraska Cornhuskers football team represented the University of Nebraska in the 1969 NCAA University Division football season. The team was led by eighth-year head coach Bob Devaney and played their home games in Memorial Stadium in Lincoln. In his first year as offensive coordinator, Tom Osborne instituted the I formation.

The Huskers lost the opener at home to fifth-ranked USC, and were 2–2 after a loss in the conference opener at #7 Missouri. They won their final six regular season games to tie for the Big Eight championship, were invited to the Sun Bowl in El Paso, and decisively beat the Georgia Bulldogs to finish the season at 9–2.

The Huskers' strong finish in 1969 was followed by consecutive national championships in 1970 and 1971; after the rout of second-ranked Alabama in the 1972 Orange Bowl, Nebraska's unbeaten streak reached 32 games.

== Schedule ==
Date	Time	Opponent	Rank	Site	TV	Result	Attendance	Source
September 20	1:30 pm	No. 5 USC*		Memorial Stadium; Lincoln, NE		L 21–31	67,058	
September 27	1:50 pm	Texas A&M*		Memorial Stadium; Lincoln, NE	ABC	W 14–0	66,331	
October 4	1:30 pm	at Minnesota*		Memorial Stadium; Minneapolis, MN (rivalry)		W 42–14	52,136	
October 11	1:30 pm	at No. 7 Missouri	No. 20	Memorial Stadium; Columbia, MO (rivalry)		L 7–17	60,500	
October 18	1:30 pm	Kansas		Memorial Stadium; Lincoln, NE (rivalry)		W 21–17	63,223–66,667	
October 25	1:30 pm	Oklahoma State		Memorial Stadium; Lincoln, NE		W 13–3	66,421	
November 1	1:30 pm	No. 18 Colorado		Memorial Stadium; Lincoln, NE (rivalry)		W 20–7	67,084	
November 8	1:30 pm	Iowa State^{†}	No. 20	Memorial Stadium; Lincoln, NE (rivalry)		W 17–3	67,107	
November 15	1:30 pm	at Kansas State	No. 17	KSU Stadium; Manhattan, KS (rivalry)		W 10–7	40,000	
November 22	1:30 pm	at Oklahoma	No. 16	Oklahoma Memorial Stadium; Norman, OK (rivalry)		W 44–14	53,500	
December 20	1:00 pm	vs. Georgia*	No. 14	Sun Bowl; El Paso, TX (Sun Bowl)	CBS	W 45–6	26,668	
*Non-conference game; ^{†}Homecoming; Rankings from AP Poll released prior to the game; All times are in Central time

== Roster ==
Adkins, John #57 (So.) DE; Ahlmann, Harold (Jr.) MG; Anderson, Jim #18 (So.) RCB; Ashman, Carl #53 (Sr.) LG; Bomberger, Bill #46 (Jr.) FB; Boyd, David (So.) E Branch, Jim (So.) LB; Brownson, Van #12 (So.) QB; Buda, Joe #52 (Sr.) C Carstens, Jim (So.) FB; Chandler, George #33 (Jr.) LB; Coppa, Rich (So.) C Davis, Harold (So.) LG; Decker, John #21 (Jr.) LCB; DeOrio, Lonnie (So.) DT; Didur, Dale #84 (Jr.) SE; Drakulich, Ron #41 (Sr.) DT; Dumler, Doug #78 (So.) LT; Dvorsak, Tony #11 (Jr.) QB; Fiala, Adrian #32 (Sr.) LB; Frost, Larry #28 (Sr.) HB; Galbraith, Denis (Unk) MG; Geddes, Ken #37 (Sr.) MG; Graves, Lanny (So.) FB; Green, Mike #34 (Sr.) FB; Grenfell, Bob #59 (Jr.) LG; Gutzman, Dennis #39 (Jr.) DE; Hacias, Greg (So.) S Harvey, Phil #83 (So.) TE; Hauge, Bruce #48 (So.) LB; Hinckley, Ron #65 (So.) RG; Hollstein, Gary #29 (So.) S Holmes, Bill (So.) E Hopkins, John #79 (So.) RT; Hornbacher, Bill #55 (Sr.) DT	Hughes, Jeff #26 (So.) HB; Hyland, John #58 (So.) DE; Ingles, Guy #88 (Jr.) SE; Jacobson, Larry #75 (So.) DT; Jamail, Doug #50 (So.) C Janssen, Bill #82 (So.) DE; Jarmon, Sherwin #81 (Sr.) DE; Jennings, Henry #38 (So.) MON; Jones, George (So.) S Kinney, Jeff #35 (So.) HB; Kinsel, John (So.) C Kobza, Dan #49 (Sr.) LB; Kontos, Ken (So.) LB; Kosch, Bill #24 (So.) RCB; Larson, Al #20 (Sr.) MON; Liddle, Kent #51 (So.) C Liggett, Bob #71 (Sr.) DT; List, Jerry #85 (So.) TE; Lowe, Rex #83 HB; Mabin, Wes #39 (So.) LCB; Malone, Dan (So.) DT; Mason, Dave #87 (So.) E McClelland, Tom #16 (So.) S McFarland, Bob #27 (So.) RCB; McFarland, Jim #80 (Sr.) TE; McGhee, Donnie #70 (Jr.) RT; McGowan, Tom (So.) LB; McGuire, Mike #15 (So.) MON; Menser, Charles #63 (So.) RG; Miller, Jim #86 (So.) DE; Minzak, Edward (So.) RG; Montgomery, Al #47 (So.) HB; Morell, Pat #40 (So.) LB; Morock, David #43 (Jr.) MON; Morrill, Pat (Unk) LB	Murtaugh, Jerry #42 (Jr.) LB; Newton, Bob #74 (Jr.) LT; Newton, Clint (So.) E Orduna, Joe #31 (Sr.) HB; Osberg, Chuck #17 (So.) QB; Pabis, Bob #66 (So.) MG; Patrick, Frank #10 (Sr.) QB; Patterson, Glenn #72 (Sr.) C Periard, Ed #56 (Jr.) MG; Pitts, John #54 (So.) DE; Pogge, Bill (So.) FB; Reeves, Randy #25 (Sr.) S Rogers, Paul #30 (Jr.) PK; Schloff, Merle #69 (So.) DT; Schneiss, Dan #22 (Jr.) FB; Smith, Jim #23 (So.) HB; Snyder, Bob (So.) RT; Sobota, Joe (So.) DT; Stejskal, Greg #68 (So.) LT; Stephenson, Dana #36 (Sr.) LCB; Tagge, Jerry #14 (So.) QB; Tegels, John (So.) LB; Terrio, Bob #45 (So.) FB; Topliff, Paul #73 (Sr.) RT; Vactor, Frank #19 (Jr.) HB; Volberding, Ron #64 (So.) RG; Walline, Dave #76 (Jr.) DT; Weber, Bruce #61 (So.) LG; Wenner, Rick (So.) S Williams, Gale #77 (Sr.) RG; Winter, Wally #67 (Jr.) LT; Witliff, Frank (So.) HB; Wynn, Mike #90 (Sr.) DE; Yanda, Steve #44 (So.) LB

Defense

FS
Randy Reeves
Tom McClelland
Gary Hollstein

INSDIE	INSDIE
Adrian Fiala	Jerry Murtaugh
Dan Kobza	Pat Morell
George Chandler	Steve Yanda

MONSTER BACK
Al Larson
David Morock
Henry Jennings

CB
Dana Stephenson
John Decker
Wes Mabin

DE	DT	NT	DT	DE
Mike Wynn	Bob Liggett	Ken Geddes	Dave Walline	Sherwin Jarmon
Bill Janssen	Ron Drakulich	Ed Periard	Larry Jacobson	Dennis Gutzman
Jim Miller	Merle Schloff	Bob Pabis	Bill Hornbacher	John Pitts

CB
Jim Anderson
Bill Kosch
Bob McFarland

Offense

SE
Guy Ingles
Dave Mason
Dale Didur

LT	LG	C	RG	RT
Bob Newton	Carl Ashman	Glenn Patterson	Gale Williams	Paul Topliff
Wally Winter	Bob Grenfell	Joe Buda	Ron Volberding	Donnie McGhee
Doug Dumler	Bruce Weber	Kent Liddle	Charles Menser	John Hopkins

TE
Jim McFarland
Phil Harvey
Frank Patrick

WB
Larry Frost
Paul Rogers
Jeff Hughes

QB
Jerry Tagge
Van Brownson
Tony Dvorsak

FB
Dan Schneiss
Mike Green
Bill Bomberger

Special teams

RB
Jeff Kinney
Frank Vactor
Jeff Hughes

== Coaching staff ==
Name	Title	First year in this position	Years at Nebraska	Alma mater
Bob Devaney	Head Coach	1962	1962–72	Alma
Tom Osborne	Offensive coordinator	1969	1964–97	Hastings
Cletus Fischer	Offensive Line	1960	1960–85	Nebraska
Carl Selmer	Offensive Line		1962–72	
Jim Ross			1962–76	
John Melton	Tight Ends. Wingbacks	1973	1962–88	Wyoming
Mike Corgan	Running Backs	1962	1962–82	Notre Dame
Monte Kiffin	Defensive coordinator	1969	1967–76	Nebraska
Warren Powers	Defensive Backs	1969	1969–76	Nebraska
Boyd Epley	Head Strength Coach	1969	1969–2003	Nebraska
Bill Thornton	Graduate assistant	1969	1969–72	Nebraska

== Game summaries ==
=== USC ===
#5 USC at Nebraska [box score]

Team	1	2	3	4	Total
• #5 USC	7	14	7	3	31
Nebraska	0	7	0	14	21

- Date: September 20
- Location: Memorial Stadium, Lincoln, NE
- Game attendance: 67,058

USC had a fight on their hands, despite jumping out to an early 14–0 lead. Nebraska scrambled back and drew up within 7 points in the 4th quarter with 3:40 to go. The Cornhuskers again got the ball back with enough time to score, but USC intercepted and converted the turnover into a field goal in the final seconds to decide the outcome.

=== Texas A&M ===
Texas A&M at Nebraska [box score]

Team	1	2	3	4	Total
Texas A&M	0	0	0	0	0
• Nebraska	7	7	0	0	14

- Date: September 27
- Location: Memorial Stadium, Lincoln, NE
- Game attendance: 66,331

The Cornhuskers put up a touchdown in each of the first two quarters before Texas A&M was somehow able to bottle them up, but the Blackshirts had already established that the Aggies would get nothing on the day, and the 14 Nebraska points were carried for the win.

=== Minnesota ===
Nebraska at Minnesota [box score]

Team	1	2	3	4	Total
• Nebraska	0	14	14	14	42
Minnesota	7	7	0	0	14

- Date: October 4
- Location: Memorial Stadium, Minneapolis, MN
- Game attendance: 52,136

Nebraska QB Jerry Tagge broke a record while taking apart Minnesota in Minneapolis. The 587 total Cornhusker yards was the second highest total in school history, and his 219 air yards and 82 ground yards rang up to 301 on the day, easily breaking the previous record of 264 yards set in 1951 and tied in 1967. The game started in doubt as Minnesota struck first and forced Nebraska to a 14–14 tie at the half, but there would be no further scoring from the Golden Gophers to answer the additional 28 Nebraska points posted after the half.

=== Missouri ===
#20 Nebraska at #7 Missouri [box score]

Team	1	2	3	4	Total
#20 Nebraska	0	0	7	0	7
• #7 Missouri	7	7	3	0	17

- Date: October 11
- Location: Faurot Field, Columbia, MO
- Game attendance: 60,500

Nebraska attempted to bring a fight to Columbia to go along with their new #20 ranking, but after Missouri went up 7–0, it did not help that the Cornhuskers turned over a fumble to Missouri which was converted into 7 more points before the half. Nebraska managed to avoid the shutout with a 3rd-quarter touchdown but could not overcome Missouri's defense to score again, and subsequently fell back out of the polls.

The Cornhuskers did not lose again until their 1972 season opener at UCLA.

=== Kansas ===
Kansas at Nebraska [box score]

Team	1	2	3	4	Total
Kansas	0	7	7	3	17
• Nebraska	6	8	0	7	21

- Date: October 18
- Location: Memorial Stadium, Lincoln, NE
- Game attendance: 66,667

Nebraska PK Paul Rogers set a Nebraska and Big Eight record with a 55-yard 1st-quarter field goal to open the scoring. It was a fierce back-and-forth game, though Nebraska ran ahead by 14 only to have Kansas, which shared the 1968 Big Eight championship but plummeted to 1–9 in 1969, tie it up in the 3rd and pull ahead with a field goal in the 4th. The Cornhuskers came through, however, putting in the game-winning touchdown with just 1:22 left to play.

=== Oklahoma State ===
Oklahoma State at Nebraska [box score]

Team	1	2	3	4	Total
Oklahoma State	0	0	3	0	3
• Nebraska	0	7	6	0	13

- Date: October 25
- Location: Memorial Stadium, Lincoln, NE
- Game attendance: 66,421

The defensive struggle of the day kept the scores low and the game in doubt late, as Nebraska held only a 10-point lead to start the 4th quarter, but the defenses held on both sides and the Cornhuskers got the win.

=== Colorado ===
#18 Colorado at Nebraska [box score]

Team	1	2	3	4	Total
#18 Colorado	7	0	0	0	7
• Nebraska	3	7	10	0	20

- Date: November 1
- Location: Memorial Stadium, Lincoln, NE
- Game attendance: 67,084

Nebraska's 13 point margin of victory was directly attributable to the school record 3 interceptions by Dana Stephenson, two of which were subsequently converted into touchdowns, giving Nebraska the upset win.

=== Iowa State ===
Iowa State at #20 Nebraska [box score]

Team	1	2	3	4	Total
Iowa State	0	3	0	0	3
• #20 Nebraska	0	7	10	0	17

- Date: November 8
- Location: Memorial Stadium, Lincoln, NE
- Game attendance: 67,107

Iowa State was held to only 27 yards on the ground in front a Memorial Stadium homecoming crowd, as Nebraska held the Cyclones to just a 2nd-quarter field goal on their way to the win.

=== Kansas State ===
#17 Nebraska at Kansas State [box score]

Team	1	2	3	4	Total
• #17 Nebraska	0	0	3	7	10
Kansas State	7	0	0	0	7

- Date: November 15
- Location: KSU Stadium, Manhattan, KS
- Game attendance: 40,000

The Blackshirts allowed Kansas State a touchdown early on, but closed the door for the rest of the game. The Cornhusker offense needed that support, as they were not able to put up their own points until splitting the uprights with a field goal late in the 3rd, and very much needed the touchdown punched in about 10 minutes later to pull ahead for the victory.

=== Oklahoma ===
#16 Nebraska at Oklahoma [box score]

Team	1	2	3	4	Total
• #16 Nebraska	14	3	13	14	44
Oklahoma	7	0	0	7	14

- Date: November 22
- Location: Oklahoma Memorial Stadium, Norman, OK
- Game attendance: 53,500

Scoring summary
1	OU	Mildren 18-yard run (Derr kick)	OU 7–0
1	NEB	Brownson 1-yard run (Rogers kick)	Tied 7–7
1	NEB	Kinney 3-yard run (Rogers kick)	NEB 14–7
2	NEB	Rogers 26-yard field goal	NEB 17–7
3	NEB	Kinney 11-yard run (run failed)	NEB 23–7
3	NEB	Ingles 7-yard pass from Kinney (Rogers kick)	NEB 30–7
4	NEB	Kinney 6-yard pass from Brownson (Rogers kick)	NEB 37–7
4	OU	Nordgren 16-yard pass from Mildren (Derr kick)	NEB 37–14
4	NEB	Hughes 6-yard run (Rogers kick)	NEB 44–14

Nebraska fought from behind to deliver Coach Devaney's first win in Norman, a convincing win in which the Blackshirts held the season's Heisman Trophy winner Steve Owens to just 71 yards with no touchdowns, breaking his 17-game touchdown streak.

=== Georgia ===
#14 Nebraska vs Georgia [box score]

Team	1	2	3	4	Total
• #14 Nebraska	18	0	14	13	45
Georgia	0	0	0	6	6

- Date: December 20
- Location: Sun Bowl, El Paso, TX
- Game attendance: 31,728

Nebraska opened the day with four straight 1st-quarter field goals, setting new Nebraska and Big Eight records in the process, which was the beginning of Georgia being left far behind. By the time the Bulldogs found the scoreboard on a 4th-quarter touchdown, they merely closed the gap to 6–38, which the Cornhuskers then answered with one more touchdown before the final whistle.

== Rankings ==
Ranking movements Legend: ██ Increase in ranking ██ Decrease in ranking — = Not ranked
	Week													
Poll	Pre	1	2	3	4	5	6	7	8	9	10	11	12	Final
AP	—	—	—	20	—	—	—	20	17	16	13	13	14	11
Coaches														12

== Awards ==
Award	Name(s)
All-America; 1st team	Jim McFarland, Dana Stephenson
Big Eight Sophomore of the Year	Jeff Kinney
All-Big Eight; 1st team	Ken Geddes, Bob Liggett, Jim McFarland, Jerry Murtaugh, Dana Stephenson
All-Big Eight; 2nd team	Sherwin Jarmon
All-Big Eight honorable mention	Carl Ashman, Van Brownson, Guy Ingles, Al Larson, Glenn Patterson, Jerry Tagge, Paul Topliff, Dave Walline, Mike Wynn

== 1969 team players in the NFL ==
The 1969 Nebraska Cornhuskers seniors selected in the 1970 NFL draft:

Player	Position	Round	Pick	Franchise
Jim McFarland	TE	7	164	St. Louis Cardinals
Ken Geddes	LB	7	175	Detroit Lions
Dana Stephenson	DB	8	183	Chicago Bears
Mike Wynn	DE	8	206	Oakland Raiders
Frank Patrick	QB	10	251	Green Bay Packers
Bob Liggett	DT	15	390	Kansas City Chiefs
Mike Green	RB	16	406	San Diego Chargers
Glenn Patterson	C	17	439	Dallas Cowboys

The 1969 Nebraska Cornhuskers juniors selected in the following year's 1971 NFL draft:

Player	Position	Round	Pick	Franchise
Joe Orduna	RB	2	49	San Francisco 49ers
Bob Newton	T	3	71	Chicago Bears
Paul Rogers	K–DB	8	190	Pittsburgh Steelers
Dan Schneiss	TE	11	261	Boston Patriots

The 1969 Nebraska Cornhuskers sophomores selected in the 1972 NFL draft:

Player	Position	Round	Pick	Franchise
Jerry Tagge	QB	1	11	Green Bay Packers
Jeff Kinney	RB	1	23	Kansas City Chiefs
Larry Jacobson	DT	1	24	New York Giants
Carl Johnson	T	5	112	New Orleans Saints
Van Brownson	QB	8	204	Baltimore Colts
Keith Wortman	G	10	242	Green Bay Packers

=== NFL and pro players ===
The following 1969 Nebraska players joined a professional team as draftees or free agents.

Name	Team
Doug Dumler	New England Patriots
Ken Geddes	Los Angeles Rams
Larry Jacobson	New York Giants
Bill Janssen	Charlotte Hornets
Sherwin Jarmon	Chicago Fire
Jeff Kinney	Kansas City Chiefs
Bob Liggett	Kansas City Chiefs
Dave Mason	New England Patriots
Jim McFarland	St. Louis Cardinals
Bob Newton	Chicago Bears
Joe Orduna	New York Giants
Frank Patrick	Green Bay Packers
Jerry Tagge	Green Bay Packers
Frank Vactor	Washington Redskins
