= 1969 Colorado Buffaloes football team =

American college football season

1969 Colorado Buffaloes football

Liberty Bowl, W 47–33 vs. Alabama
- Conference: Big Eight Conference

Ranking
- AP: No. 16
- Record: 8–3 (5–2 Big 8)
- Head coach: Eddie Crowder (7th season)
- Offensive coordinator: Chet Franklin (1st season)
- Offensive scheme: Slot-I triple option
- Defensive coordinator: Don James (2nd season)
- Base defense: 4–3
- MVP: Bobby Anderson
- Captains: Bobby Anderson; Bill Collins; Mike Pruett
- Home stadium: Folsom Field

1969 Big Eight Conference football standings
	Conf.					Overall
Team	W		L		T	W		L		T
No. 6 Missouri +	6	–	1	–	0	9	–	2	–	0
No. 11 Nebraska +	6	–	1	–	0	9	–	2	–	0
No. 16 Colorado	5	–	2	–	0	8	–	3	–	0
Oklahoma	4	–	3	–	0	6	–	4	–	0
Kansas State	3	–	4	–	0	5	–	5	–	0
Oklahoma State	3	–	4	–	0	5	–	5	–	0
Iowa State	1	–	6	–	0	3	–	7	–	0
Kansas	0	–	7	–	0	1	–	9	–	0
+ – Conference co-champions; Rankings from AP Poll

The 1969 Colorado Buffaloes football team represented the University of Colorado in the Big Eight Conference during the 1969 NCAA University Division football season. Led by seventh-year head coach Eddie Crowder, Colorado finished the regular season at 7–3 (5–2 in Big 8, third), and played their home games on campus at Folsom Field in Boulder, Colorado.

Invited to the Liberty Bowl in Memphis, Tennessee, the Buffs defeated Alabama 47–33 to complete the season at 8–3; CU outscored its opponents 276 to 227 and climbed to sixteenth in the final AP poll.

== Schedule ==
Date	Opponent	Rank	Site	TV	Result	Attendance	Source
September 20	Tulsa*		Folsom Field; Boulder, CO		W 35–14	34,784	
September 27	at No. 2 Penn State*		Beaver Stadium; University Park, PA		L 3–27	51,342	
October 4	Indiana*		Folsom Field; Boulder, CO		W 30–7	31,354	
October 11	at Iowa State		Clyde Williams Field; Ames, IA		W 14–0	29,000	
October 18	at No. 12 Oklahoma		Oklahoma Memorial Stadium; Norman, OK		L 30–42	60,450	
October 25	No. 5 Missouri^{†}		Folsom Field; Boulder, CO		W 31–24	41,886	
November 1	at Nebraska	No. 18	Memorial Stadium; Lincoln, NE (rivalry)		L 7–20	67,084	
November 8	at Kansas		Memorial Stadium; Lawrence, KS		W 17–14	37,000	
November 15	Oklahoma State		Folsom Field; Boulder, CO		W 17–14	29,500	
November 22	Kansas State		Folsom Field; Boulder, CO (rivalry)		W 45–32	37,400	
December 13	vs. Alabama*		Memphis Memorial Stadium; Memphis, TN (Liberty Bowl)	ABC	W 47–33	50,144	
*Non-conference game; ^{†}Homecoming; Rankings from AP Poll released prior to the game

== Personnel ==
=== Roster ===
1969 Colorado Buffaloes football team roster
Players
Coaches
Offense

Pos.	#	Name	Class
QB, RB	11	Bobby Anderson	Sr
HB	25	Steve Engel

Defense

Pos.	#	Name	Class
DT	77	Bill Brundige	Sr

Special teams

Pos.	#	Name	Class

Head coach

- Eddie Crowder (7th year)

Coordinators/assistant coaches

- Chet Franklin (OC)
- Don James (DC)

Legend

- (C) Team captain
- (S) Suspended
- (I) Ineligible
- Injured
- Redshirt

Roster

=== Coaching staff ===
- Head coach: Eddie Crowder
- Assistants: Chet Franklin (OC), Don James (DC), Ken Blair (DE), Rick Duval (WR), C.B. McGowan (backs), Jim Mora (DL), Steve Ortmayer (OL), Steve Sidwell (LB), Augie Tammariello (OL), Dan Stavely (Freshmen)

=== Starters ===
- Offense: QB Jim Batten/Paul Arendt, TB Bobby Anderson, FB Ward Walsh, WR Bob Matsen, SE Monte Huber, TE Mike Pruett, TT Jim Phillips, TG Dick Melin, C Don Popplewell, SG Dennis Havig, ST Eddie Fusiek
- Defense: LE Herb Ovis, LT Dave Perini/Bill Collins, RT Dave Capra, RE Bill Brundige, OLB Bill Blanchard, MLB Phil Iriwn, OLB Rick Ogle, LCB Jim Cooch, LS Pat Murphy, RS Pete Jacobsen, RCB Eric Harris
- Specialists: PK Dave Haney, P Dick Robert

== NFL draft ==
Four Buffaloes were selected in the 1970 NFL draft, which was seventeen rounds (442 selections).

Player	Position	Round	Overall	NFL club
Bobby Anderson	Running back	1	11	Denver Broncos
Bill Brundige	Defensive tackle	2	43	Washington Redskins
Eric Harris	Defensive back	3	69	St. Louis Cardinals
Steve Engel	Running back	5	125	Cleveland Browns
