= 1969 TCU Horned Frogs football team =

American college football season

1969 TCU Horned Frogs football
- Conference: Southwest Conference
- Record: 4–6 (4–3 SWC)
- Head coach: Fred Taylor (3rd season)
- Offensive scheme: TCU spread
- Home stadium: Amon G. Carter Stadium

1969 Southwest Conference football standings
	Conf.					Overall
Team	W		L		T	W		L		T
No. 1 Texas $	7	–	0	–	0	11	–	0	–	0
No. 7 Arkansas	6	–	1	–	0	9	–	2	–	0
Texas Tech	4	–	3	–	0	5	–	5	–	0
TCU	4	–	3	–	0	4	–	6	–	0
SMU	3	–	4	–	0	3	–	7	–	0
Rice	2	–	5	–	0	3	–	7	–	0
Texas A&M	2	–	5	–	0	3	–	7	–	0
Baylor	0	–	7	–	0	0	–	10	–	0
$ – Conference champion; Rankings from AP Poll

The 1969 TCU Horned Frogs football team represented Texas Christian University (TCU) in the 1969 NCAA University Division football season. The Horned Frogs finished the season 4–6 overall and 4–3 in the Southwest Conference. The team was coached by Fred Taylor in his third year as head coach. The Frogs played their home games in Amon G. Carter Stadium, which is located on campus in Fort Worth, Texas.

== Schedule ==
Date	Time	Opponent	Site	Result	Attendance	Source
September 20		No. 18 Purdue*	Amon G. Carter Stadium; Fort Worth, TX	L 35–42	25,000	
September 27		at No. 1 Ohio State*	Ohio Stadium; Columbus, OH	L 0–62	86,412	
October 4		at No. 3 Arkansas	War Memorial Stadium; Little Rock, AR	L 6–24	48,127	
October 10		at SMU	Cotton Bowl; Dallas, TX (rivalry)	L 17–19	31,575	
October 18		Texas A&M	Amon G. Carter Stadium; Fort Worth, TX (rivalry)	W 16–6	38,123	
October 24	7:15 p.m.	at Miami (FL)*	Miami Orange Bowl; Miami, FL	L 9–14	21,195	
November 1		at Baylor	Baylor Stadium; Waco, TX (rivalry)	W 31–14	25,000	
November 8		Texas Tech	Amon G. Carter Stadium; Fort Worth, TX (rivalry)	W 35–26	25,278	
November 15		at No. 2 Texas	Memorial Stadium; Austin, TX (rivalry)	L 7–69	51,000	
November 22		Rice	Amon G. Carter Stadium; Fort Worth, TX	W 21–17	19,786	
*Non-conference game; Rankings from AP Poll released prior to the game; All times are in Central time
