= 1969 Oklahoma Sooners football team =

American college football season

1969 Oklahoma Sooners football
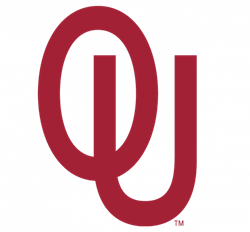
- Conference: Big Eight Conference
- Record: 6–4 (4–3 Big 8)
- Head coach: Chuck Fairbanks (3rd season)
- Offensive coordinator: Barry Switzer (4th season)
- Captains: Steve Owens; Steve Zabel
- Home stadium: Oklahoma Memorial Stadium

1969 Big Eight Conference football standings
	Conf.					Overall
Team	W		L		T	W		L		T
No. 6 Missouri +	6	–	1	–	0	9	–	2	–	0
No. 11 Nebraska +	6	–	1	–	0	9	–	2	–	0
No. 16 Colorado	5	–	2	–	0	8	–	3	–	0
Oklahoma	4	–	3	–	0	6	–	4	–	0
Kansas State	3	–	4	–	0	5	–	5	–	0
Oklahoma State	3	–	4	–	0	5	–	5	–	0
Iowa State	1	–	6	–	0	3	–	7	–	0
Kansas	0	–	7	–	0	1	–	9	–	0
+ – Conference co-champions; Rankings from AP Poll

The 1969 Oklahoma Sooners football team represented the University of Oklahoma in the 1969 NCAA University Division football season. It was the 75th season for the Sooners.

Following wins over two bad teams to begin the season, the Sooners alternated losses and wins for the rest of the way. OU was competitive in their Red River Shootout loss to eventual national champion Texas, but their other defeats were by a combined margin of 147-45. Those lopsided outcomes steered bowl officials away from the Sooners.

== Schedule ==
Date	Opponent	Rank	Site	TV	Result	Attendance	Source
September 20	at Wisconsin*	No. 6	Camp Randall Stadium; Madison, WI		W 48–21	43,633	
September 27	Pittsburgh*	No. 6	Oklahoma Memorial Stadium; Norman, OK		W 37–8	56,600	
October 11	vs. No. 2 Texas*	No. 8	Cotton Bowl; Dallas, TX (Red River Shootout)	ABC	L 17–27	71,938	
October 18	Colorado	No. 12	Oklahoma Memorial Stadium; Norman, OK		W 42–30	60,450	
October 25	at No. 18 Kansas State	No. 11	KSU Stadium; Manhattan, KS		L 21–59	38,500	
November 1	Iowa State		Oklahoma Memorial Stadium; Norman, OK		W 37–14	54,500	
November 8	at No. 9 Missouri	No. 20	Memorial Stadium; Columbia, MO (rivalry)	ABC	L 10–44	61,000	
November 15	Kansas		Oklahoma Memorial Stadium; Norman, OK		W 31–15	59,128	
November 22	No. 16 Nebraska		Oklahoma Memorial Stadium; Norman, OK (rivalry)		L 14–44	53,500	
November 29	at Oklahoma State		Lewis Field; Stillwater, OK (Bedlam Series)		W 28–27	38,200	
*Non-conference game; Rankings from AP Poll released prior to the game

== Rankings ==
Ranking movements Legend: ██ Increase in ranking ██ Decrease in ranking — = Not ranked т = Tied with team above or below
	Week													
Poll	Pre	1	2	3	4	5	6	7	8	9	10	11	12	Final
AP	6	6	6	8	12	11	—	20 т	—	—	—	—	—	—

== Game summaries ==
=== Oklahoma State (Bedlam Series) ===
Oklahoma Sooners at Oklahoma State Cowboys

Team	1	2	3	4	Total
• Oklahoma	14	0	7	7	28
Oklahoma State	7	14	0	6	27

- Date: November 29
- Location: Lewis Field, Stillwater, Oklahoma
- Game attendance: 38,200

Scoring summary
1		Oklahoma	Owens 1-yard run (Derr kick)	Oklahoma 7-0
1		Oklahoma	Killingsworth 51-yard pass from Mildren (Derr kick)	Oklahoma 14-0
1		Oklahoma St	Cutburth 8-yard run (Pruss kick)	Oklahoma 14-7
2		Oklahoma St	Cutburth 1-yard run (Pruss kick)	Tie 14-14
2		Oklahoma St	Eben 7-yard pass from Cutburth (Pruss kick)	Oklahoma St 21-14
3		Oklahoma	Owens 1-yard run (Derr kick)	Tie 21-21
4		Oklahoma	Mildren 34-yard run (Derr kick)	Oklahoma 28-21
4	1:33	Oklahoma St	Eben 7-yard pass from Cutburth (run failed)	Oklahoma 28-27

Steve Owens rushed for a career-high 261 yards and broke the single season Big Eight touchdown record set by Nebraska's Bobby Reynolds in 1950.

== Roster ==
1969 Oklahoma Sooners football team roster
Players
Coaches
Offense

Pos.	#	Name	Class
WB	37	Gary Jamar	Jr
WR	83	Joe Killingsworth	Sr
C	54	Bob Klitzman	Jr
C	50	Ken Mendenhall	Sr
QB	11	Jack Mildren	So
TB	36	Steve Owens	Sr

Defense

Pos.	#	Name	Class
RE	84	Jim Files	Sr
DT	69	Randy Little	Jr
DHB	26	Jerry Hetherington	Jr
DHB	32	Rick Hetherington	Sr
LB	82	Steve Zabel	Sr

Special teams

Pos.	#	Name	Class

Head coach

- Chuck Fairbanks

Coordinators/assistant coaches

- Galen Hall (WR)
- Warren Harper (LB)
- Gene Hochevar
- Pat James
- Larry Lacewell (DE)
- Bill Michael (OL)
- Barry Switzer (OC)

Legend

- (C) Team captain
- (S) Suspended
- (I) Ineligible
- Injured
- Redshirt

Roster

== Awards and honors ==
- Steve Owens, Heisman Trophy
- Steve Owens, Walter Camp Award

== NFL draft ==
The following players were drafted into the National Football League following the season.

Round	Pick	Player	Position	NFL team
1	6	Steve Zabel	Linebacker	Philadelphia Eagles
1	13	Jim Files	Linebacker	New York Giants
1	19	Steve Owens	Running back	Detroit Lions
5	116	Ken Mendenhall	Center	Atlanta Falcons
8	187	Jack Porter	Center	New York Jets
17	420	Joe Killingsworth	Wide receiver	Boston Patriots
