= 1969 SMU Mustangs football team =

American college football season

1969 SMU Mustangs football
- Conference: Southwest Conference
- Record: 3–7 (3–4 SWC)
- Head coach: Hayden Fry (8th season)
- Home stadium: Cotton Bowl

1969 Southwest Conference football standings
	Conf.					Overall
Team	W		L		T	W		L		T
No. 1 Texas $	7	–	0	–	0	11	–	0	–	0
No. 7 Arkansas	6	–	1	–	0	9	–	2	–	0
Texas Tech	4	–	3	–	0	5	–	5	–	0
TCU	4	–	3	–	0	4	–	6	–	0
SMU	3	–	4	–	0	3	–	7	–	0
Rice	2	–	5	–	0	3	–	7	–	0
Texas A&M	2	–	5	–	0	3	–	7	–	0
Baylor	0	–	7	–	0	0	–	10	–	0
$ – Conference champion; Rankings from AP Poll

The 1969 SMU Mustangs football team represented Southern Methodist University (SMU) as a member of the Southwest Conference (SWC) during the 1969 NCAA University Division football season. Led by eighth-year head coach Hayden Fry, the Mustangs compiled an overall record of 3–7 with a conference mark of 3–4, placing fifth in the SWC.

== Schedule ==
Date	Time	Opponent	Site	Result	Attendance	Source
September 13	8:35 p.m.	Air Force*	Cotton Bowl; Dallas, TX	L 22–26	44,300	
September 20		at Georgia Tech*	Grant Field; Atlanta, GA	L 21–24	42,624	
September 27		at Michigan State*	Spartan Stadium; East Lansing, MI	L 15–23	72,189	
October 10		TCU	Cotton Bowl; Dallas, TX (rivalry)	W 19–17	31,575	
October 18		at Rice	Rice Stadium; Houston, TX (rivalry)	W 34–14	30,000	
October 25		Texas Tech	Cotton Bowl; Dallas, TX	L 24–27	27,465	
November 1		No. 2 Texas	Cotton Bowl; Dallas, TX	L 14–45	55,287	
November 8		at Texas A&M	Kyle Field; College Station, TX	L 10–20	33,220	
November 15		No. 4 Arkansas	Cotton Bowl; Dallas, TX	L 15–28	35,673	
November 22		at Baylor	Baylor Stadium; Waco, TX	W 12–6	20,000	
*Non-conference game; Rankings from AP Poll released prior to the game; All times are in Central time

== Roster ==
1969 SMU Mustangs football team roster
Players			Coaches
Offense: Pos. / # / Name / Class; QB / 10 / Chuck Hixson / Jr	Defense: Pos. / # / Name / Class	Special teams: Pos. / # / Name / Class	Head coach: Hayden Fry; Coordinators/assistant coaches Legend: (C) Team captain; (S) Suspended; (I) Ineligible; Injured; Redshirt
