= 1969 Texas Tech Red Raiders football team =

American college football season

1969 Texas Tech Red Raiders football
- Conference: Southwest Conference
- Record: 5–5 (4–3 SWC)
- Head coach: J. T. King (9th season)
- Offensive scheme: T formation
- Base defense: 4–3
- Home stadium: Jones Stadium

1969 Southwest Conference football standings
	Conf.					Overall
Team	W		L		T	W		L		T
No. 1 Texas $	7	–	0	–	0	11	–	0	–	0
No. 7 Arkansas	6	–	1	–	0	9	–	2	–	0
Texas Tech	4	–	3	–	0	5	–	5	–	0
TCU	4	–	3	–	0	4	–	6	–	0
SMU	3	–	4	–	0	3	–	7	–	0
Rice	2	–	5	–	0	3	–	7	–	0
Texas A&M	2	–	5	–	0	3	–	7	–	0
Baylor	0	–	7	–	0	0	–	10	–	0
$ – Conference champion; Rankings from AP Poll

The 1969 Texas Tech Red Raiders football team represented Texas Tech University in the Southwest Conference (SWC) during the 1969 NCAA University Division football season. In their ninth and final season under head coach J. T. King, the Red Raiders compiled a 5–5 record (4–3 against conference opponents), tied for third place in the SWC, and were outscored by opponents by a combined total of 240 to 212. The team's statistical leaders included Charles Napper with 901 passing yards, Danny Hardaway with 483 rushing yards, and David May with 340 receiving yards. The team played its home games at Clifford B. & Audrey Jones Stadium.

== Schedule ==
Date	Opponent	Site	Result	Attendance	Source
September 20	Kansas*	Jones Stadium; Lubbock, TX	W 38–22	43,201–42,250	
September 27	at No. 4 Texas	Memorial Stadium; Austin, TX (rivalry)	L 7–49	65,200	
October 4	at Oklahoma State*	Lewis Field; Stillwater, OK	L 10–17	28,500	
October 11	Texas A&M	Jones Stadium; Lubbock, TX (rivalry)	W 13–9	49,000	
October 18	Mississippi State*	Jones Stadium; Lubbock, TX	L 26–30	34,000	
October 25	at SMU	Cotton Bowl; Dallas, TX	W 27–24	27,465	
November 1	Rice^{†}	Jones Stadium; Lubbock, TX	W 24–14	38,500	
November 8	at TCU	Amon G. Carter Stadium; Fort Worth, TX (rivalry)	L 26–35	25,278	
November 15	Baylor	Jones Stadium; Lubbock, TX (rivalry)	W 41–7	32,000	
November 27	at No. 2 Arkansas	War Memorial Stadium; Little Rock, AR (rivalry)	L 0–33	35,287	
*Non-conference game; ^{†}Homecoming; Rankings from AP Poll released prior to the game

== Roster ==
1969 Texas Tech Red Raiders football team roster
Players
Coaches
Offense

Pos.	#	Name	Class
OT	73	Phil Barney	So
FB	41	Jimmy Bennett	Sr
WR	82	Robby Best	So
OT	76	David Browning	So
WR	87	Charles Evans	Sr
RB	44	Danny Hardaway	So
RB	42	Larry Hargrave	Jr
C	54	Mark Hazelwood	Jr
C	51	Jon Hill	So
OT	79	Mike Holladay	Sr
RB	26	Ken Kattner	So
RB	43	John Kleinert	So
RB	34	Miles Langehennig	So
QB	17	Joe Matulich	Sr
WR	83	David May	Jr
QB	15	Charles Napper	So
G	60	Tom Newton	Jr
TE	80	Johnny Odom	So
C	50	Jesse Richardson	Jr
WR	89	Ronnie Ross	So
OT	72	Jerry Ryan	So
QB	13	Tom Sawyer	Sr
WR	16	Lane Wade	Jr
G	68	Water Yarbrough	Jr
RB	30	Reagan Young	So
OT	71	Chuck Zeller	So

Defense

Pos.	#	Name	Class
LB	58	Scott Brady	So
S	22	Bruse Bushong	So
DE	88	Richard Campbell	Sr
DE	91	Bruce Dowdy	Jr
LB	32	Mark Fincannon	Jr
DB	31	Denton Fox	Sr
DT	56	Dickie Grigg	Sr
DB	21	John Howard	Jr
LB	62	Dennis Lane	Sr
DT	77	Wayne McDermand	Jr
LB	52	Larry Molinare	So
DT	67	Pete Norwood	Jr
DB	25	Dale Rebold	So
DB	23	Jerry Watson	Jr

Special teams

Pos.	#	Name	Class
K	33	Jerry Don Sanders	Sr

Head coach

- J. T. King

Coordinators/assistant coaches

Legend

- (C) Team captain
- (S) Suspended
- (I) Ineligible
- Injured
- Redshirt
