= 1969 Baylor Bears football team =

American college football season

1969 Baylor Bears football
- Conference: Southwest Conference
- Record: 0–10 (0–7 SWC)
- Head coach: Bill Beall (1st season)
- Captains: Gordon Utgard; Ed Marsh
- Home stadium: Baylor Stadium

1969 Southwest Conference football standings
	Conf.					Overall
Team	W		L		T	W		L		T
No. 1 Texas $	7	–	0	–	0	11	–	0	–	0
No. 7 Arkansas	6	–	1	–	0	9	–	2	–	0
Texas Tech	4	–	3	–	0	5	–	5	–	0
TCU	4	–	3	–	0	4	–	6	–	0
SMU	3	–	4	–	0	3	–	7	–	0
Rice	2	–	5	–	0	3	–	7	–	0
Texas A&M	2	–	5	–	0	3	–	7	–	0
Baylor	0	–	7	–	0	0	–	10	–	0
$ – Conference champion; Rankings from AP Poll

The 1969 Baylor Bears football team represented Baylor University in the Southwest Conference (SWC) during the 1969 NCAA University Division football season. In their first season under head coach Bill Beall, the Bears compiled a 0–10 record (0–7 against conference opponents), finished in last place in the conference, and were outscored by opponents by a combined total of 344 to 87. They played their home games at Baylor Stadium in Waco, Texas.

The team's statistical leaders included Steve Stuart with 535 passing yards, Randy Cooper with 364 rushing yards, Jerry Smith with 373 receiving yards, and Gene Rogers and Pinkie Palmer with 36 points scored each. Gordon Utgard was the team captain.

== Schedule ==
Date	Opponent	Site	Result	Attendance	Source
September 20	Kansas State*	Baylor Stadium; Waco, TX	L 15–48	30,000	
September 27	at Georgia Tech*	Grant Field; Atlanta, GA	L 10–17	37,776	
October 4	at No. 16 LSU*	Tiger Stadium; Baton Rouge, LA	L 8–63	65,000	
October 11	No. 4 Arkansas	Baylor Stadium; Waco, TX	L 7–21	30,000–30,200	
October 25	at Texas A&M	Kyle Field; College Station, TX (rivalry)	L 0–24	37,190	
November 1	TCU^{†}	Baylor Stadium; Waco, TX (rivalry)	L 14–31	25,000	
November 8	at No. 2 Texas	Memorial Stadium; Austin, TX (rivalry)	L 14–56	51,000–55,000	
November 15	at Texas Tech	Jones Stadium; Lubbock, TX (rivalry)	L 7–41	32,000	
November 22	SMU	Baylor Stadium; Waco, TX	L 6–12	20,000	
November 29	at Rice	Rice Stadium; Houston, TX	L 6–34	17,000	
*Non-conference game; ^{†}Homecoming; Rankings from AP Poll released prior to the game
