= 1969 Texas A&M Aggies football team =

American college football season

1969 Texas A&M Aggies football
- Conference: Southwest Conference
- Record: 3–7 (2–5 SWC)
- Head coach: Gene Stallings (5th season)
- Home stadium: Kyle Field

1969 Southwest Conference football standings
	Conf.					Overall
Team	W		L		T	W		L		T
No. 1 Texas $	7	–	0	–	0	11	–	0	–	0
No. 7 Arkansas	6	–	1	–	0	9	–	2	–	0
Texas Tech	4	–	3	–	0	5	–	5	–	0
TCU	4	–	3	–	0	4	–	6	–	0
SMU	3	–	4	–	0	3	–	7	–	0
Rice	2	–	5	–	0	3	–	7	–	0
Texas A&M	2	–	5	–	0	3	–	7	–	0
Baylor	0	–	7	–	0	0	–	10	–	0
$ – Conference champion; Rankings from AP Poll

The 1969 Texas A&M Aggies football team represented Texas A&M University in the 1969 NCAA University Division football season as a member of the Southwest Conference (SWC). The Aggies were led by head coach Gene Stallings in his fifth season and finished with a record of three wins and seven losses (3–7 overall, 2–5 in the SWC).

== Schedule ==
Date	Time	Opponent	Site	Result	Attendance	Source
September 20		at LSU*	Tiger Stadium; Baton Rouge, LA (rivalry)	L 6–35	67,501	
September 27		at Nebraska*	Memorial Stadium; Lincoln, NE	L 0–14	66,331	
October 4	1:00 p.m.	at Army*	Michie Stadium; West Point, NY	W 20–13	41,000	
October 11		at Texas Tech	Jones Stadium; Lubbock, TX (rivalry)	L 9–13	49,000	
October 18		at TCU	Amon G. Carter Stadium; Fort Worth, TX	L 6–16	38,123	
October 25		Baylor	Kyle Field; College Station, TX (rivalry)	W 24–0	37,190	
November 1		at No. 4 Arkansas	Razorback Stadium; Fayetteville, AR (rivalry)	L 13–35	43,140	
November 8		SMU	Kyle Field; College Station, TX	W 20–10	33,220	
November 15		at Rice	Rice Stadium; Houston, TX	L 6–7	41,000	
November 27		No. 1 Texas	Kyle Field; College Station, TX (rivalry)	L 12–49	44,598	
*Non-conference game; Rankings from AP Poll released prior to the game; All times are in Central time
