= 1969 Rice Owls football team =

American college football season

1969 Rice Owls football
- Conference: Southwest Conference
- Record: 3–7 (2–5 SWC)
- Head coach: Bo Hagan (3rd season)
- Home stadium: Rice Stadium

1969 Southwest Conference football standings
	Conf.					Overall
Team	W		L		T	W		L		T
No. 1 Texas $	7	–	0	–	0	11	–	0	–	0
No. 7 Arkansas	6	–	1	–	0	9	–	2	–	0
Texas Tech	4	–	3	–	0	5	–	5	–	0
TCU	4	–	3	–	0	4	–	6	–	0
SMU	3	–	4	–	0	3	–	7	–	0
Rice	2	–	5	–	0	3	–	7	–	0
Texas A&M	2	–	5	–	0	3	–	7	–	0
Baylor	0	–	7	–	0	0	–	10	–	0
$ – Conference champion; Rankings from AP Poll

The 1969 Rice Owls football team was an American football team that represented Rice University in the Southwest Conference (SWC) during the 1969 NCAA University Division football season. In its third season under head coach Bo Hagan, the team compiled a 3–7 record (2–5 against SWC opponents), tied for sixth place in the conference, and was outscored by a total of 225 to 168. The team played its home games at Rice Stadium in Houston.

The team's statistical leaders included quarterback Stahle Vincent with 556 passing yards, tailback Mike Spruill with 440 rushing yards and 48 points scored, and Bob Brown with 375 receiving yards. Vincent was the first African-American to be the starting quarterback for a Southwest Conference football team.

== Schedule ==
Date	Time	Opponent	Site	Result	Attendance	Source
September 20		VMI*	Rice Stadium; Houston, TX	W 55–0	18,000	
September 27		LSU*	Rice Stadium; Houston, TX	L 0–42	55,000	
October 4	1:31 p.m.	at California*	Memorial Stadium; Berkeley, CA	L 21–31	37,000	
October 18		SMU	Rice Stadium; Houston, TX (rivalry)	L 14–34	30,000	
October 25		at No. 2 Texas	Memorial Stadium; Austin, TX (rivalry)	L 0–31	61,500	
November 1		at Texas Tech	Jones Stadium; Lubbock, TX	L 14–24	38,500	
November 8		No. 4 Arkansas	Rice Stadium; Houston, TX	L 6–30	43,140	
November 15		Texas A&M	Rice Stadium; Houston, TX	W 7–6	41,000	
November 22		at TCU	Amon G. Carter Stadium; Fort Worth, TX	L 17–21	19,786	
November 29		Baylor	Rice Stadium; Houston, TX	W 34–6	17,000	
*Non-conference game; Rankings from AP Poll released prior to the game; All times are in Central time
