= Walter Camp Award =

American college football award

- Walter Camp Foundation logo
- Awarded for: Player of the year in college football
- Country: United States
- Presented by: Walter Camp Football Foundation

History
- First award: 1967
- Most recent: Indiana quarterback Fernando Mendoza
- Website: WalterCamp.org

The Walter Camp Player of the Year Award is given annually to the collegiate American football player of the year, as decided by a group of National Collegiate Athletic Association (NCAA) Division I FBS head coaches and sports information directors under the auspices of the Walter Camp Football Foundation. The award is named for Walter Camp, an important and influential figure in the development of the sport. Three players have won the award twice: Colt McCoy of the University of Texas in 2008 and 2009, Archie Griffin of Ohio State in 1974 and 1975, and O. J. Simpson of USC in 1967 and 1968.

== Winners ==
List of Walter Camp Award winners
Year	Winner	Position	School	Ref
1967	O. J. Simpson	RB	USC	
1968	O. J. Simpson (2)	RB	USC	
1969	Steve Owens	RB	Oklahoma	
1970	Jim Plunkett	QB	Stanford	
1971	Pat Sullivan	QB	Auburn	
1972	Johnny Rodgers	WR	Nebraska	
1973	John Cappelletti	RB	Penn State	
1974	Archie Griffin	RB	Ohio State	
1975	Archie Griffin (2)	RB	Ohio State	
1976	Tony Dorsett	RB	Pittsburgh	
1977	Ken MacAfee	TE	Notre Dame	
1978	Billy Sims	RB	Oklahoma	
1979	Charles White	RB	USC	
1980	Hugh Green	DE	Pittsburgh	
1981	Marcus Allen	RB	USC	
1982	Herschel Walker	RB	Georgia	
1983	Mike Rozier	RB	Nebraska	
1984	Doug Flutie	QB	Boston College	
1985	Bo Jackson	RB	Auburn	
1986	Vinny Testaverde	QB	Miami (FL)	
1987	Tim Brown	WR	Notre Dame	
1988	Barry Sanders	RB	Oklahoma State	
1989	Anthony Thompson	RB	Indiana	
1990	Raghib Ismail	WR/RS	Notre Dame	
1991	Desmond Howard	WR	Michigan	
1992	Gino Torretta	QB	Miami (FL)	
1993	Charlie Ward	QB	Florida State	
1994	Rashaan Salaam	RB	Colorado	
1995	Eddie George	RB	Ohio State	
1996	Danny Wuerffel	QB	Florida	
1997	Charles Woodson	CB	Michigan	
1998	Ricky Williams	RB	Texas	
1999	Ron Dayne	RB	Wisconsin	
2000	Josh Heupel	QB	Oklahoma	
2001	Eric Crouch	QB	Nebraska	
2002	Larry Johnson	RB	Penn State	
2003	Larry Fitzgerald	WR	Pittsburgh	
2004	Matt Leinart	QB	USC	
2005	Reggie Bush	RB	USC	
2006	Troy Smith	QB	Ohio State	
2007	Darren McFadden	RB	Arkansas	
2008	Colt McCoy	QB	Texas	
2009	Colt McCoy (2)	QB	Texas	
2010	Cam Newton	QB	Auburn	
2011	Andrew Luck	QB	Stanford	
2012	Manti Te'o	LB	Notre Dame	
2013	Jameis Winston	QB	Florida State	
2014	Marcus Mariota	QB	Oregon	
2015	Derrick Henry	RB	Alabama	
2016	Lamar Jackson	QB	Louisville	
2017	Baker Mayfield	QB	Oklahoma	
2018	Tua Tagovailoa	QB	Alabama	
2019	Joe Burrow	QB	LSU	
2020	DeVonta Smith	WR	Alabama	
2021	Kenneth Walker III	RB	Michigan State	
2022	Caleb Williams	QB	USC	
2023	Jayden Daniels	QB	LSU	
2024	Travis Hunter	CB/WR	Colorado	
2025	Fernando Mendoza	QB	Indiana	

== Awards won by school ==
This is a list of the schools that have had a player win the Walter Camp Award. USC has the most award winners, with seven. In total, players from 22 different schools have won the Walter Camp Award.

School	Trophies
USC	7*
Ohio State	4*
Oklahoma	4
Notre Dame	4
Alabama	3
Auburn	3
Nebraska	3
Pittsburgh	3
Texas	3*
Colorado	2
Florida State	2
Indiana	2
LSU	2
Miami	2
Michigan	2
Penn State	2
Stanford	2
Arkansas	1
Boston College	1
Florida	1
Georgia	1
Louisville	1
Michigan State	1
Oklahoma State	1
Oregon	1
Wisconsin	1

*Designates double award winner
