= 1969 Kansas State Wildcats football team =

American college football season

1969 Kansas State Wildcats football
- Conference: Big Eight Conference
- Record: 5–5 (3–4 Big 8)
- Head coach: Vince Gibson (3rd season)
- Home stadium: KSU Stadium

1969 Big Eight Conference football standings
	Conf.					Overall
Team	W		L		T	W		L		T
No. 6 Missouri +	6	–	1	–	0	9	–	2	–	0
No. 11 Nebraska +	6	–	1	–	0	9	–	2	–	0
No. 16 Colorado	5	–	2	–	0	8	–	3	–	0
Oklahoma	4	–	3	–	0	6	–	4	–	0
Kansas State	3	–	4	–	0	5	–	5	–	0
Oklahoma State	3	–	4	–	0	5	–	5	–	0
Iowa State	1	–	6	–	0	3	–	7	–	0
Kansas	0	–	7	–	0	1	–	9	–	0
+ – Conference co-champions; Rankings from AP Poll

The 1969 Kansas State Wildcats football team represented Kansas State University in the 1969 NCAA University Division football season. The team's head football coach was Vince Gibson. The Wildcats played their home games in KSU Stadium.

The team was again led by quarterback Lynn Dickey and finished the season ranked as the top passing offense in the Big Eight Conference for the second straight year. Kansas State also led the Big Eight in rushing defense. Despite the good statistics, 1969 saw the Wildcats finish with an even record of 5–5, and a 3–4 record in the Big Eight. The Wildcats did, however, post the school's first victory over a ranked team, rolling over #11 Oklahoma, 59–21.

== Schedule ==
Date	Opponent	Rank	Site	Result	Attendance	Source
September 20	at Baylor*		Baylor Stadium; Waco, TX	W 45–15	30,000	
September 27	at Arizona*		Arizona Stadium; Tucson, AZ	W 42–27	38,750	
October 4	No. 2 Penn State*		KSU Stadium; Manhattan, KS	L 14–17	37,000	
October 11	at Kansas		Memorial Stadium; Lawrence, KS (rivalry)	W 26–22	51,000	
October 18	Iowa State		KSU Stadium; Manhattan, KS (rivalry)	W 34–7	29,000	
October 25	No. 11 Oklahoma^{†}	No. 18	KSU Stadium; Manhattan, KS	W 59–21	38,500	
November 1	at No. 14 Missouri	No. 12	Memorial Stadium; Columbia, MO	L 38–41	40,000	
November 8	at Oklahoma State	No. 15	Lewis Field; Stillwater, OK	L 19–28	35,700	
November 15	No. 17 Nebraska		KSU Stadium; Manhattan, KS (rivalry)	L 7–10	40,000	
November 22	at Colorado		Folsom Field; Boulder, CO (rivalry)	L 32–45	37,400	
*Non-conference game; ^{†}Homecoming; Rankings from AP Poll released prior to the game

== Roster ==
1969 Kansas State Wildcats football team roster
Players
Coaches
Offense

Pos.	#	Name	Class
WR	40	Charlie Collins	Sr
QB	11	Lynn Dickey	Jr
G	76	Ira Gordon	Sr
RB	32	Russell Harrison
RB	42	Mack Herron	Sr
OT	75	Lynn Larson	Sr
WR	44	Bob Long	So
RB	23	Mike Montgomery	Jr
G	79	Dean Shaternick	Jr
TE	80	Forrest Wells	Jr
WR	48	Sonny Yarnell	Jr
OL	69	James Carver	Jr

Defense

Pos.	#	Name	Class
LB	55	Keith Best	So
DB	20	Ron Dickerson	Jr
LB	54	Jim Dukelow	Jr
DE	84	Mike Kuhn	Jr
LB	57	Randy Ross	Sr
DB	26	Clarence Scott	Jr
DE	70	Ron Yankowski	Jr

Special teams

Pos.	#	Name	Class

Head coach

- Vince Gibson

Coordinators/assistant coaches

- Dick Steinberg – Offensive backs
- Dean Pryor – Wide receiver
- Don Powell – Offensive line
- Jerry Elliott – Defensive line
- Bob Frazier – Defensive ends
- Sam Robertson – Linebackers
- Jesse Branch – Defensive backs

Legend

- (C) Team captain
- (S) Suspended
- (I) Ineligible
- Injured
- Redshirt
