= Bill Beall =

American football player, coach, and administrator (1922–2013)

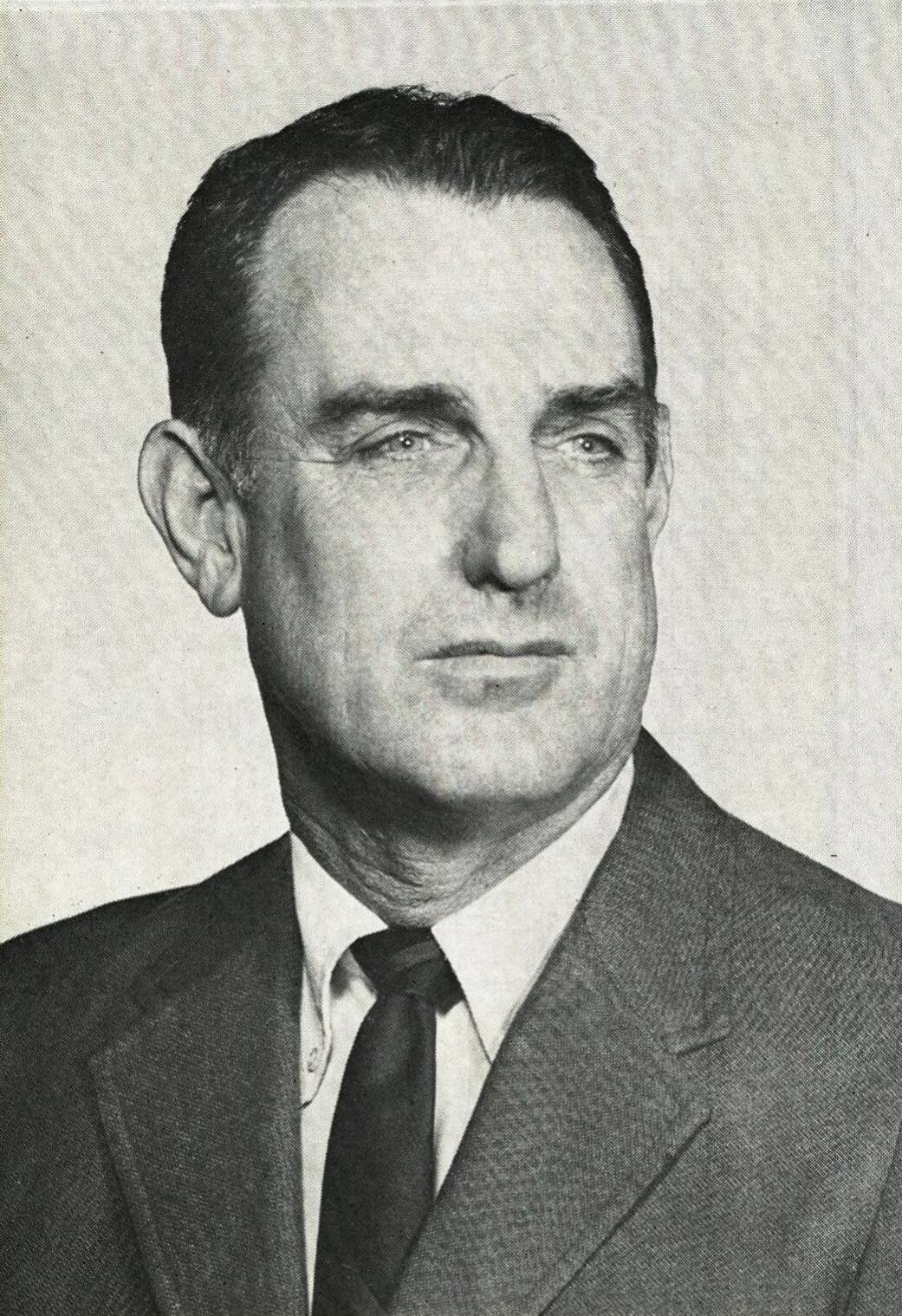
- Beall in 1969

Biographical details
- Born: January 24, 1922; Osceola, Arkansas, U.S.
- Died: November 2, 2013 (aged 91); Memphis, Tennessee, U.S.

Playing career
- 1941: Arkansas State
- Position: Halfback

Coaching career (HC unless noted)
- 1950–1951: Osceola HS (AR) (assistant)
- 1952–1954: Osceola HS (AR)
- 1955: Arkansas State (backfield)
- 1956–1960: Rice (assistant)
- 1961–1968: LSU (assistant)
- 1969–1971: Baylor

Administrative career (AD unless noted)
- 1972–1975: Northeast Louisiana

Head coaching record
- Overall: 3–28 (college)

William Erby Beall (January 24, 1922 – November 2, 2013) was an American football coach and college athletics administrator. He served as the head coach at Baylor University from 1969 to 1971, compiling a record of 3–28. A native of Osceola, Arkansas, Beall graduated from Memphis State College, now the University of Memphis, in 1950.

== Head coaching record ==
=== College ===
Year	Team	Overall	Conference	Standing
Baylor Bears (Southwest Conference) (1969–1971)
1969	Baylor	0–10	0–7	8th
1970	Baylor	2–9	1–6	7th
1971	Baylor	1–9	0–7	8th
Baylor:		3–28	1–20	
Total:		3–28		
