= 1969 Arkansas Razorbacks football team =

American college football season

1969 Arkansas Razorbacks football

Sugar Bowl, L 22–27 vs. Ole Miss
- Conference: Southwest Conference

Ranking
- Coaches: No. 3
- AP: No. 7
- Record: 9–2 (6–1 SWC)
- Head coach: Frank Broyles (12th season)
- Offensive scheme: Multiple
- Defensive coordinator: Charlie Coffey (4th season)
- Base defense: 4–3
- Captains: Rodney Brand; Bruce Maxwell; Cliff Powell; Terry Stewart
- Home stadium: Razorback Stadium; War Memorial Stadium

1969 Southwest Conference football standings
| | Conf. | | | | | Overall |
| Team | W | | L | | T | W | | L | | T |
|---|---|---|---|---|---|---|---|---|---|---|
| No. 1 Texas $ | 7 | – | 0 | – | 0 | 11 | – | 0 | – | 0 |
| No. 7 Arkansas | 6 | – | 1 | – | 0 | 9 | – | 2 | – | 0 |
| Texas Tech | 4 | – | 3 | – | 0 | 5 | – | 5 | – | 0 |
| TCU | 4 | – | 3 | – | 0 | 4 | – | 6 | – | 0 |
| SMU | 3 | – | 4 | – | 0 | 3 | – | 7 | – | 0 |
| Rice | 2 | – | 5 | – | 0 | 3 | – | 7 | – | 0 |
| Texas A&M | 2 | – | 5 | – | 0 | 3 | – | 7 | – | 0 |
| Baylor | 0 | – | 7 | – | 0 | 0 | – | 10 | – | 0 |
$ – Conference champion; Rankings from AP Poll

The 1969 Arkansas Razorbacks football team represented the University of Arkansas in the Southwest Conference (SWC) during the 1969 NCAA University Division football season. In their 12th year under head coach Frank Broyles, the Razorbacks compiled a 9–2 record (6–1 against SWC opponents), finished in second place behind Texas in the SWC, and outscored all opponents by a combined total of 353 to 103. The team finished the season ranked No. 7 in the final AP poll and No. 3 in the final UPI Coaches Poll and went on to lose to Ole Miss in the 1970 Sugar Bowl. The loss to No. 1 Texas in the Big Shootout game, is still considered the most devastating defeat in program history. That loss robbed Arkansas of a conference title and a national championship.

== Schedule ==
| Date | Time | Opponent | Rank | Site | TV | Result | Attendance | Source |
|---|---|---|---|---|---|---|---|---|
| September 20 | | Oklahoma State* | No. 2 | War Memorial Stadium; Little Rock, AR | | W 39–0 | 51,125 | |
| September 27 | | Tulsa* | No. 3 | Razorback Stadium; Fayetteville, AR | | W 55–0 | 42,000–43,617 | |
| October 4 | | TCU | No. 3 | War Memorial Stadium; Little Rock, AR | | W 24–6 | 48,127 | |
| October 11 | | at Baylor | No. 3 | Baylor Stadium; Waco, TX | | W 21–7 | 30,000–30,200 | |
| October 25 | 2:00 p.m. | Wichita State* | No. 4 | War Memorial Stadium; Little Rock, AR | | W 52–14 | 36,000–36,178 | |
| November 1 | | Texas A&M | No. 4 | Razorback Stadium; Fayetteville, AR (rivalry) | ABC | W 35–13 | 43,140 | |
| November 8 | | at Rice | No. 4 | Rice Stadium; Houston, TX | | W 30–6 | 32,290 | |
| November 15 | | at SMU | No. 4 | Cotton Bowl; Dallas, TX | | W 28–15 | 35,673 | |
| November 27 | | Texas Tech | No. 2 | War Memorial Stadium; Little Rock, AR (rivalry) | | W 33–0 | 35,287 | |
| December 6 | | No. 1 Texas | No. 2 | Razorback Stadium; Fayetteville, AR (Game of the Century, rivalry) | ABC | L 14–15 | 44,598 | |
| January 1 | | vs. No. 13 Ole Miss* | No. 3 | Tulane Stadium; New Orleans, LA (Sugar Bowl, rivalry) | ABC | L 22–27 | 82,500 | |
*Non-conference game; Rankings from AP Poll released prior to the game; All times are in Central time; Source:

== Game summaries ==
=== Game of the Century ===
"The Big Shootout"
#1 Texas at #2 Arkansas

| Team | 1 | 2 | 3 | 4 | Total |
|---|---|---|---|---|---|
| • Longhorns | 0 | 0 | 0 | 15 | 15 |
| Razorbacks | 7 | 0 | 7 | 0 | 14 |

- Date: December 6
- Location: Razorback Stadium, Fayetteville, Arkansas
- Game start: 12:20 pm
- Game attendance: 47,500
- Game weather: 38 °F (3 °C), overcast with rain, Wind SE 10 mph (16 km/h)
- Referee: Carl Landiss
- TV announcers (ABC): Chris Schenkel and Bud Wilkinson

Scoring summary
| 1 | | ARK | Bill Burnett 1-yard run (McClard kick) | ARK 7–0 |
| 3 | | ARK | Chuck Dicus 29-yard pass from Bill Montgomery (McClard kick) | ARK 14–0 |
| 4 | | TEX | James Street 42-yard run (Street run) | ARK 14–8 |
| 4 | 3:58 | TEX | Jim Bertelsen 2-yard run (Happy Feller kick) | TEXAS 15–14 |

With two legendary coaches (Broyles and Royal), two neighboring states, two football powerhouses (8 of last 10 SWC Championships), and two recent National Championships (Arkansas in 1964 and Texas in 1963), Arkansas and Texas had developed a rivalry. The game was moved from the usual third week in October to the first week in December so it could be televised nationally on ABC. President Richard Nixon attended the game, and AstroTurf was even installed in Razorback Stadium in preparation for the game.

Arkansas' top-rated defense was going up against the #1-rated Texas offense, but the Hogs got on top early, with a 1-yard TD run by Bill Burnett. After halftime, Chuck Dicus hauled in a 29-yard touchdown pass, giving the Razorbacks a 14–0 lead heading into the game's final quarter. Longhorn QB James Street then led his squad to its first touchdown, and as coach Darrell Royal had planned, Texas attempted and completed the two-point conversion, which would in all likelihood prevent a tie.

Arkansas then had the ball and the lead, and a 73-yard drive later, the Hogs were in good position to tack on a field goal that would put the game out of reach, but Razorback QB Bill Montgomery was intercepted in the end zone, giving the Longhorns new life. The Texas drive appeared stalled at the Longhorns' own 43, on a 4th and 3, when Royal gambled again. A 44-yard pass to Randy Peschel, who caught the ball in double coverage, put Texas at the Arkansas 13. Longhorn RB Jim Bertelsen would run in for the tying six points. The extra-point snap was high, but was snared by third-string QB Donnie Wigginton and the kick was converted by Longhorn kicker Happy Feller, giving Texas a 15–14 lead with 3:58 to play.

Arkansas drove to the Texas 40, looking for a field goal from All-American kicker Bill McClard, but the turnover bug struck again as Montgomery was again picked off.

=== Sugar Bowl ===
| | 1 | 2 | 3 | 4 | Total |
|---|---|---|---|---|---|
| Razorbacks | 0 | 12 | 3 | 7 | 22 |
| Rebels | 14 | 10 | 3 | 0 | 27 |

Rivals Ole Miss and Arkansas met in the 1970 Sugar Bowl.

Ole Miss RB Bo Bowen scampered 69 yards to open the scoring, with Archie Manning adding another 18-yard TD run. Down 14–0, Arkansas responded with a 12-yard TD run by Bill Burnett, but the extra point was missed, and after a Rebel field goal and Archie Manning 30-yard TD strike, were down 24–6. Before halftime, Chuck Dicus hauled in a 47-yard pass from Bill Montgomery, but the two-point conversion was incomplete, and the Rebels took a 24–12 halftime lead.

The third quarter produced a field goal from each team, and in the fourth quarter fullback Bruce Maxwell caught a six-yard strike from Montgomery to cut the lead to five, but the rally fell short, the Hogs losing by a 27–22 final.

Scoring summary

| Quarter | Time | Drive | | | Team | Scoring information | Score | |
| Quarter | Time | Plays | Yards | TOP | Team | Scoring information | ARK | UM |
|---|---|---|---|---|---|---|---|---|
| 1 | | | 80 | | UM | Bo Bowen 69-yard touchdown run, King kick good | 0 | 7 |
| 1 | | | 80 | | UM | Archie Manning 18-yard touchdown run, King kick good | 0 | 14 |
| 2 | | | 81 | | ARK | Bill Burnett 12-yard touchdown run, Bill McClard kick no good | 6 | 14 |
| 2 | | | 57 | | UM | 52-yard field goal by Hinton | 6 | 17 |
| 2 | | | 55 | | UM | Vernon Studdard 30-yard touchdown reception from Archie Manning, King kick good | 6 | 24 |
| 2 | | | 80 | | ARK | Chuck Dicus 47-yard touchdown reception from Bill Montgomery, 2-point pass no good | 12 | 24 |
| 3 | | | 44 | | UM | 36-yard field goal by Hinton | 12 | 27 |
| 3 | | | 80 | | ARK | 35-yard field goal by Bill McClard | 15 | 27 |
| 4 | | | 11 | | ARK | Bruce Maxwell 6-yard touchdown reception from Bill Montgomery, Bill McClard kick good | 22 | 27 |
| "TOP" = time of possession. For other American football terms, see Glossary of American football. | | | | | | | 22 | 27 |

== Roster ==
- QB Bill Montgomery, Jr.

John Eichler QB Steve Walters QB Bill Burnett* RB Bruce Maxwell* RB Paul Blevins RB Russ Garber RB Russell Cody RB Mike Hendren RB Dick Fuller RB Chuck Dicus* WR John Rees* WR David Cox WR Steve Hockersmith WR Mike Schaufele WR W. Powell WR Pat Morrison* TE Bobby Nichols TE Rodney Brand* OL Jerry Dossey* OL Ronnie Hammers* OL Mike Kelson* OL Bob Stankovich* OL Terry Hopkins OL Jim Mullins OL Dick Bumpas* DL Bruce James* DL Rick Kersey* DL Gordon McNulty* DL Roger Harnish DL

Mike Boschetti* LB Lynn Garner* LB Cliff Powell* LB Richard Coleman LB Ronnie Jones LB Dennis Berner* DB Bobby Field* DB Jerry Moore* DB Terry Stewart* DB Steve Birdwell DB Dave Hogue DB Cary Stockdell P
