= 1969 Oklahoma State Cowboys football team =

American college football season

1969 Oklahoma State Cowboys football
- Conference: Big Eight Conference
- Record: 5–5 (3–4 Big 8)
- Head coach: Floyd Gass (1st season)
- Home stadium: Lewis Field

1969 Big Eight Conference football standings
	Conf.					Overall
Team	W		L		T	W		L		T
No. 6 Missouri +	6	–	1	–	0	9	–	2	–	0
No. 11 Nebraska +	6	–	1	–	0	9	–	2	–	0
No. 16 Colorado	5	–	2	–	0	8	–	3	–	0
Oklahoma	4	–	3	–	0	6	–	4	–	0
Kansas State	3	–	4	–	0	5	–	5	–	0
Oklahoma State	3	–	4	–	0	5	–	5	–	0
Iowa State	1	–	6	–	0	3	–	7	–	0
Kansas	0	–	7	–	0	1	–	9	–	0
+ – Conference co-champions; Rankings from AP Poll

The 1969 Oklahoma State Cowboys football team represented Oklahoma State University in the Big Eight Conference during the 1969 NCAA University Division football season. In their first season under head coach Floyd Gass, the Cowboys compiled a 5–5 record (3–4 against conference opponents), tied for fifth place in the conference, and were outscored by opponents by a combined total of 200 to 197.

On offense, the 1969 team averaged 19.7 points scored, 132.0 rushing yards, and 164.1 passing yards per game. On defense, the team allowed an average of 20.0 points scored, 188.0 rushing yards, and 155.3 passing yards per game. The team's statistical leaders included Bob Deerinwater with 587 rushing yards, Bob Cutburth with 1,593 passing yards, and Hermann Eben with 733 receiving yards and 42 points scored.

Offensive lineman John Ward was selected by the AFCA, FWAA, and Kodak as a first-team All-American. Ward, middle guard John Little, halfback Benny Goodwin, and tackle Jerry Sherk were selected as first-team All-Big Eight Conference players. Linebacker Gary Darnell set a single-game Oklahoma State record with 27 tackles against Texas Tech on October 4, 1969. John Gates set the Oklahoma State record for interceptions in a season with 8.

The team played its home games at Lewis Field in Stillwater, Oklahoma.

== Schedule ==
Date	Opponent	Site	Result	Attendance	Source
September 20	at No. 2 Arkansas*	War Memorial Stadium; Little Rock, AR	L 0–39	51,125	
September 27	Houston*	Lewis Field; Stillwater, OK	W 24–18	23,500	
October 4	Texas Tech*	Lewis Field; Stillwater, OK	W 17–10	28,500	
October 18	at No. 6 Missouri	Memorial Stadium; Columbia, MO	L 21–31	51,000	
October 25	at Nebraska	Memorial Stadium; Lincoln, NE	L 3–13	66,421	
November 1	at Kansas	Memorial Stadium; Lawrence, KS	W 28–25	40,000	
November 8	No. 15 Kansas State^{†}	Lewis Field; Stillwater, OK	W 28–19	35,700	
November 15	at Colorado	Folsom Field; Boulder, CO	L 14–17	29,500	
November 22	at Iowa State	Clyde Williams Field; Ames, IA	W 35–0	10,000	
November 29	Oklahoma	Lewis Field; Stillwater, OK (Bedlam Series)	L 27–28	38,200	
*Non-conference game; ^{†}Homecoming; Rankings from AP Poll released prior to the game

== After the season ==
The 1970 NFL draft was held on January 27–28, 1970. The following Cowboys were selected.

Round	Pick	Player	Position	NFL club
1	25	John Ward	Guard	Minnesota Vikings
2	47	Jerry Sherk	Defensive tackle	Cleveland Browns
6	131	Bob Cutburth	Quarterback	Chicago Bears
14	358	John Little	Defensive tackle	New York Jets
