= Emery Hicks =

American gridiron football player (born 1947)

Profile
- Position: Linebacker

Personal information
- Born: August 10, 1947; Bartlesville, Oklahoma, U.S.
- Died: March 17, 2005 (aged 57); Oklahoma City, Oklahoma, U.S.
- Listed height: 6 ft 0 in (1.83 m)
- Listed weight: 230 lb (104 kg)

Career information
- College: Kansas

Career history
- 1971: Winnipeg Blue Bombers (CFL)
- 1971–1972: Hamilton Tiger-Cats (CFL)
- 1974: Memphis Southmen (WFL)
- 1975: San Antonio Wings (WFL)

Awards and highlights
- Grey Cup champion (1972); 2× First-team All-Big Eight (1968, 1969)

Emery Hicks (August 10, 1947 - March 17, 2005) was an American and Canadian football player who played for the Winnipeg Blue Bombers, and Hamilton Tiger-Cats. He won the Grey Cup with Hamilton in 1972. He played college football at the University of Kansas.
