= Chet Franklin =

American football player, coach, and executive (born 1935)

Profile
- Position: Offensive guard

Personal information
- Born: March 19, 1935 (age 91); Ontario, Oregon, U.S.

Career information
- High school: Elko
- College: Utah

Career history

Playing
- Utah Utes (1954–1956)

Coaching
- Stanford (1959) Assistant coach; Oklahoma (1960) Graduate assistant; Oklahoma (1961) Freshmen coach; Oklahoma (1962) Assistant coach; Colorado (1963–1968) Assistant coach; Colorado (1969–1970) Offensive coordinator; San Francisco 49ers (1971–1973) Special teams coach; San Francisco 49ers (1974) Defensive backs coach; Kansas City Chiefs (1975–1976) Offensive coordinator; Kansas City Chiefs (1977) Linebackers coach; New Orleans Saints (1978–1979) Defensive backs coach; Oakland/Los Angeles Raiders (1980–1986) Defensive backs coach/Co–defensive backs coach

Operations
- San Diego Chargers (1987–1989) Director of pro personnel; Berlin Thunder (1990–1993) Director of pro personnel/scouting coordinator; New Orleans Saints (1994–1996) Director of college scouting; New Orleans Saints (1997–1998) Assistant general manager/VP of football operations; Oakland Raiders (1999–2002?) Player personnel executive; Oakland Raiders (2003–late 2000s) Scout

Awards and highlights
- 3× Super Bowl champion
- Coaching profile at Pro Football Reference

Chester A. Franklin (born March 19, 1935) is an American former football player, coach, and executive. He won two Super Bowls in his career, both as a member of the Oakland Raiders.

== Early life ==
Chet Franklin was born on March 19, 1935, in Ontario, Oregon. He went to Elko High School. He helped them make the State Championship his senior year and was named All-State.

== College career ==
Franklin went to Utah for college. He was an offensive guard. He played there from 1953 to 1956. He went to the Marines for 2 years before he started his coaching career.

== Coaching career ==
=== Stanford ===
His first season of coaching was in 1959, with the Stanford Cardinals. He was an assistant coach.

=== Oklahoma ===
From 1960 to 1962 he served multiple roles with the Oklahoma Sooners.

=== Colorado ===
He was named an assistant coach for the University of Colorado in 1963. He was there from 1963 to 1970. He was their offensive coordinator from 1969 to 1970. In 1970, he was interviewed to be the head coach at TCU, but did not get the job.

=== San Francisco 49ers ===
His first season of NFL coaching came in 1971, as the special teams coach of the San Francisco 49ers. He was their special teams coach from 1971 to 1973. He was their defensive backs coach in 1974.

=== Kansas City Chiefs ===
In 1975, he was named the offensive coordinator of the Kansas City Chiefs. He was the coordinator for two seasons. He was demoted to linebackers coach in 1977.

=== New Orleans Saints (first stint) ===
In 1978 and 1979, he was the defensive backs coach for the New Orleans Saints.

=== Oakland/Los Angeles Raiders (first stint) ===
In 1980, he was named the defensive backs coach of the Oakland Raiders. He held that position for 7 seasons and won 2 Super Bowls.

=== San Diego Chargers ===
In 1987, he became the director of pro personnel for the San Diego Chargers. He had that position until 1990.

=== Berlin Thunder ===
He was the director of pro personnel for the Berlin Thunder from 1990 to 1993.

=== New Orleans Saints (second stint) ===
From 1994 to 1998, he held positions with the New Orleans Saints. He was the director of PR and college scouting from 1994 to 1996, and their assistant GM from 1997 to 1998. He was going to be named the interim head coach of the Saints in 1996, but declined.

=== Oakland Raiders (second stint) ===
In 1999 he returned to the Oakland Raiders as an executive. He was later a scout.
