= J. T. King =

American football player and coach, college athletics administrator (1912–1993)

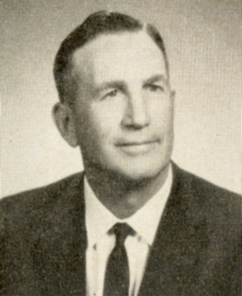
- King in 1967

Biographical details
- Born: October 22, 1912; Wilmot, Arkansas, U.S.
- Died: January 27, 1993 (aged 80); Lubbock, Texas, U.S.

Playing career
- 1935–1937: Texas
- Position: Guard

Coaching career (HC unless noted)
- 1942–1945: Enid HS (OK)
- 1946–1947: Tulane (assistant)
- 1948–1949: Texas A&M (assistant)
- 1950–1952: Texas (assistant)
- 1954–1956: Texas (assistant)
- 1957–1960: Texas Tech (assistant)
- 1961–1969: Texas Tech

Administrative career (AD unless noted)
- 1970–1978: Texas Tech

Head coaching record
- Overall: 44–45–3 (college)
- Bowls: 0–2

J. T. King (October 22, 1912 – January 27, 1993) was an American football player, coach, and college athletics administrator. He served as the head football coach at Texas Tech University from 1961 to 1969, compiling a record of a 44–45–3. King was the athletic director at Texas Tech from 1970 to 1978.

Born in Wilmot, Arkansas, King graduated from Houston Reagan High School. Collegiately, he played offensive guard under coach Dana X. Bible at Texas. He later served as an assistant coach at his alma mater from 1950 to 1952 and again from 1954 to 1956.

King was appointed head coach at Texas Tech on November 29, 1960, after DeWitt Weaver resigned to enter private business in Alabama.

King was inducted to the University of Texas Men's Athletics Hall of Honor in 1981. He died from cancer, on January 27, 1993, in Lubbock, Texas.

== Head coaching record ==
=== College ===
| Year | Team | Overall | Conference | Standing | Bowl/playoffs | Coaches^{#} | AP^{°} |
|---|---|---|---|---|---|---|---|
Texas Tech Red Raiders (Southwest Conference) (1960–1969)
| 1961 | Texas Tech | 4–6 | 2–5 | T–6th | | | |
| 1962 | Texas Tech | 1–9 | 0–7 | 8th | | | |
| 1963 | Texas Tech | 5–5 | 2–5 | T–6th | | | |
| 1964 | Texas Tech | 6–4–1 | 3–3–1 | T–4th | L Sun | | |
| 1965 | Texas Tech | 8–3 | 5–2 | T–2nd | L Gator | 10 | |
| 1966 | Texas Tech | 4–6 | 2–5 | T–6th | | | |
| 1967 | Texas Tech | 6–4 | 5–2 | 2nd | | | |
| 1968 | Texas Tech | 5–3–2 | 4–3 | 4th | | | |
| 1969 | Texas Tech | 5–5 | 4–3 | T–3rd | | | |
| Texas Tech: | | 44–45–3 | 27–35–1 | | | | |
| Total: | | 44–45–3 | | | | | |
^{#}Rankings from final Coaches Poll.; ^{°}Rankings from final AP Poll.
