= 1969 Missouri Tigers football team =

American college football season

1969 Missouri Tigers football

Big Eight co-champion

Orange Bowl, L 3–10 vs. Penn State
- Conference: Big Eight Conference

Ranking
- Coaches: No. 6
- AP: No. 6
- Record: 9–2 (6–1 Big 8)
- Head coach: Dan Devine (12th season)
- Captains: Sam Adams; Jon Staggers
- Home stadium: Memorial Stadium

1969 Big Eight Conference football standings
	Conf.					Overall
Team	W		L		T	W		L		T
No. 6 Missouri +	6	–	1	–	0	9	–	2	–	0
No. 11 Nebraska +	6	–	1	–	0	9	–	2	–	0
No. 16 Colorado	5	–	2	–	0	8	–	3	–	0
Oklahoma	4	–	3	–	0	6	–	4	–	0
Kansas State	3	–	4	–	0	5	–	5	–	0
Oklahoma State	3	–	4	–	0	5	–	5	–	0
Iowa State	1	–	6	–	0	3	–	7	–	0
Kansas	0	–	7	–	0	1	–	9	–	0
+ – Conference co-champions; Rankings from AP Poll

The 1969 Missouri Tigers football team was an American football team that represented the University of Missouri in the Big Eight Conference (Big 8) during the 1969 NCAA University Division football season. The team compiled a 9–2 record (6–1 against Big 8 opponents), finished in a tie for the Big 8 championship, lost to Penn State in the 1970 Orange Bowl, was ranked No. 6 in the final AP Poll, and outscored opponents by a combined total of 365 to 191. Dan Devine was the head coach for the 12th of 13 seasons. The team played its home games at Memorial Stadium in Columbia, Missouri.

The team's statistical leaders included Joe Moore with 1,312 rushing yards, Terry McMillan with 1,963 passing yards and 2,157 yards of total offense, Mel Gray with 705 receiving yards, and Henry Brown with 71 points scored.

== Schedule ==
Date	Opponent	Rank	Site	TV	Result	Attendance	Source
September 20	Air Force*	No. 11	Memorial Stadium; Columbia, MO		W 19–17	55,000	
September 27	vs. Illinois*	No. 11	Busch Memorial Stadium; St. Louis, MO (rivalry)		W 37–6	48,740	
October 4	at No. 13 Michigan*	No. 9	Michigan Stadium; Ann Arbor, MI		W 40–17	64,476	
October 11	No. 20 Nebraska	No. 7	Memorial Stadium; Columbia, MO (rivalry)		W 17–7	60,500	
October 18	Oklahoma State	No. 6	Memorial Stadium; Columbia, MO		W 31–21	51,000	
October 25	at Colorado	No. 5	Folsom Field; Boulder, CO		L 24–31	41,886	
November 1	No. 12 Kansas State^{†}	No. 14	Memorial Stadium; Columbia, MO		W 41–38	40,000	
November 8	No. 20 Oklahoma	No. 9	Memorial Stadium; Columbia, MO (rivalry)	ABC (regional)	W 44–10	61,000	
November 15	at Iowa State	No. 8	Clyde Williams Field; Ames, IA (rivalry)		W 40–13	21,000	
November 22	at Kansas	No. 7	Memorial Stadium; Lawrence, KS (Border War)	ABC (regional)	W 69–21	50,500	
January 1	vs. No. 2 Penn State*	No. 6	Miami Orange Bowl; Miami, FL (Orange Bowl)	NBC	L 3–10	77,282	
*Non-conference game; ^{†}Homecoming; Rankings from AP Poll released prior to the game

== Game summaries ==
=== Michigan ===
Team	1	2	3	4	Total
• Missouri	0	24	0	16	40
Michigan	3	0	14	0	17

- Date: October 4
- Location: Michigan Stadium, Ann Arbor, Michigan

Scoring summary
1		MICH	Killian 40-yard field goal	MICH 3-0
2		MU	Brown 26-yard field goal	Tied 3-3
2		MU	McBride 2-yard run (Brown kick)	MU 10-3
2		MU	McBride 1-yard run (Brown kick)	MU 17-3
2		MU		MU 24-3
3		MICH	Craw 1-yard run (Titas kick)	MU 24-10
3		MICH	Craw 1-yard run (Titas kick)	MU 24-17
4		MU	Brown 24-yard field goal	MU 27-17
4		MU	Kenemore 8-yard pass from Roper (kick failed)	MU 33-17
4	8:09	MU	Moore 62-yard run (Brown kick)	MU 40-17

=== Kansas ===
Team	1	2	3	4	Total
• Missouri	21	7	28	13	69
Kansas	0	7	7	7	21

- Date: November 22
- Location: Memorial Stadium, Lawrence, Kansas
- Game attendance: 50,500

Scoring summary
1	MU	Gray 19-yard run (Brown kick)	MU 7-0
1	MU	Gray 63-yard pass from McMillian (Brown kick)	MU 14-0
1	MU	Staggers 4-yard pass from McMillian (Brown kick)	MU 21-0
2	MU	Gray 26-yard pass from McMillian (Brown kick)	MU 28-0
2	KU	Basler 1-yard run (Bell kick)	MU 28-7
3	MU	Staggers 6-yard pass from McMillian (Brown kick)	MU 35-7
3	MU	Moore 53-yard run (Brown kick)	MU 42-7
3	MU	McMillian 6-yard run (Brown kick)	MU 49-7
3	KU	Brown 38-yard pass from Basler (Bell kick)	MU 49-14
3	MU	McMillian 1-yard run (Brown kick)	MU 56-14
4	KU	Jessie 79-yard pass from Basler (Bell kick)	MU 56-21
4	MU	Staggers 18-yard run (Brown kick)	MU 63-21
4	MU	Farmer 1-yard run (kick failed)	MU 69-21

Terry McMillian broke the Big Eight single-season touchdown pass record of 16 and the single-game school record of Paul Christman. The victory gave Missouri a share of the Big Eight title with Nebraska and a berth in the Orange Bowl.

== Roster ==
1969 Missouri Tigers football team roster
Players
Coaches
Offense

Pos.	#	Name	Class
QB	18	Terry McMillan	Sr
WR	21	Mel Gray	Jr
HB	22	Jon Staggers	Sr
FB	32	Ron McBride	Sr
OT	36	Jim Anderson	Jr
HB	45	Joe Moore	Jr
TE	48	Tyrone Walls	Jr
C	53	Bob Wilson	Jr
OT	71	Larron Jackson	Jr

Defense

Pos.	#	Name	Class
LB	30	Sam Britts	So
DB	41	Mike Fink	So
LB	55	Steve Lundholm	Sr

Special teams

Pos.	#	Name	Class

Head coach

- Dan Devine

Coordinators/assistant coaches

Legend

- (C) Team captain
- (S) Suspended
- (I) Ineligible
- Injured
- Redshirt

Roster

== Awards ==
- All-Big Eight: E Mel Gray, OT Larron Jackson, DT Mark Kuhlmann, S Dennis Poppe
- Missouri Sports Hall of Fame – inducted as a team on January 25, 2015.
