= Dave McCurry =

American football player (1951-2020)

No. 40
- Position: Safety

Personal information
- Born: February 23, 1951; Grinnell, Iowa, U.S.
- Died: August 13, 2020 (aged 69); Coralville, Iowa, U.S.
- Listed height: 6 ft 1 in (1.85 m)
- Listed weight: 187 lb (85 kg)

Career information
- High school: Grinnell
- College: Iowa State
- NFL draft: 1973: 5th round, 130th overall pick

Career history
- Miami Dolphins (1973)*; Chicago Bears (1973)*; New England Patriots (1974)
- * Offseason or practice squad member only
- Stats at Pro Football Reference

David Gene McCurry (February 2, 1951 – August 13, 2020) was an American professional football safety who played for the New England Patriots of the National Football League (NFL). He played college football at Iowa State University.
