= Steve Owens (American football) =

American football player and administrator (born 1947)

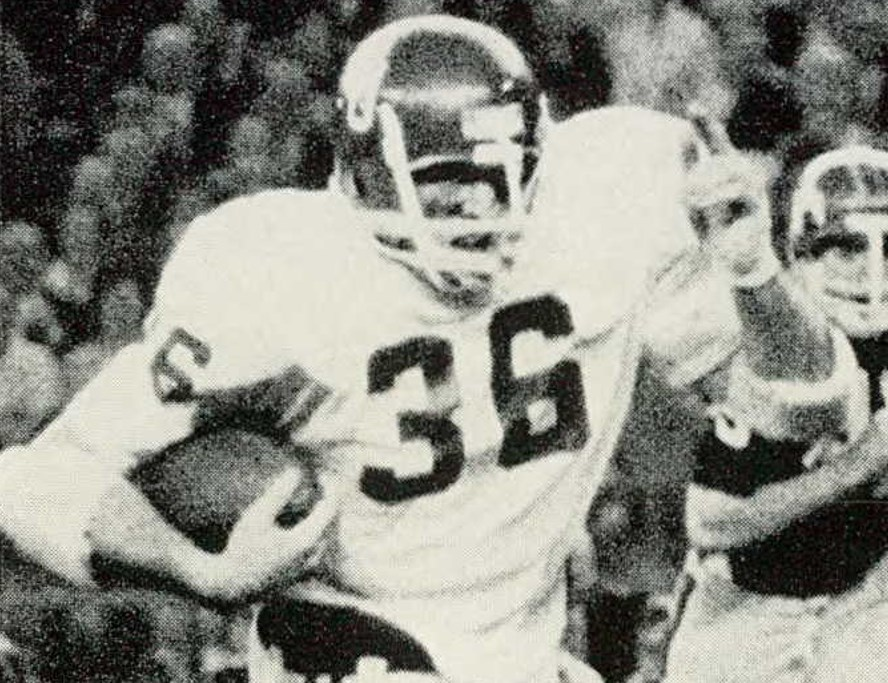
- Owens in 1969

No. 36
- Position: Running back

Personal information
- Born: December 9, 1947 (age 78); Gore, Oklahoma, U.S.
- Listed height: 6 ft 2 in (1.88 m)
- Listed weight: 215 lb (98 kg)

Career information
- High school: Miami (Miami, Oklahoma)
- College: Oklahoma (1967–1969)
- NFL draft: 1970: 1st round, 19th overall pick

Career history

Playing
- Detroit Lions (1970–1974)

Operations
- Oklahoma (1996–1998) Athletic director

Awards and highlights
- Pro Bowl (1971); Heisman Trophy (1969); SN Player of the Year (1969); Walter Camp Award (1969); Chic Harley Award (1969); Unanimous All-American (1969); Second-team All-American (1968); 2× Big Eight Player of the Year (1968, 1969); 3× First-team All-Big Eight (1967–1969)

Career NFL statistics
- Rushing yards: 2,451
- Rushing average: 3.9
- Rushing touchdowns: 20
- Receptions: 99
- Receiving yards: 861
- Receiving touchdowns: 2
- Stats at Pro Football Reference
- College Football Hall of Fame

Loren Everett "Steve" Owens (born December 9, 1947) is an American former professional football player who was a running back for five seasons with the Detroit Lions of the National Football League (NFL). He played college football for the Oklahoma Sooners, winning the Heisman Trophy and earning All-American honors in 1969. He was selected in the first round (19th overall) of the 1970 NFL draft by the Lions, and became the first Lion to rush for over a 1,000 yards in a season.

== Early life ==
Born in Gore, Oklahoma, Owens was raised in Miami, Oklahoma. He attended Miami High School, where he was a standout high school football player for the Miami Wardogs. He is in the Miami Wardogs Hall of Fame. There is a sculpture of him by the Wardogs football field, and the main east-west road connecting downtown Miami and Interstate 44 is named for Owens.

== College career ==
Owens played college football for the University of Oklahoma in Norman from 1967 to 1969. As a senior in 1969, he was recognized as a consensus first-team All-American, and became the second Oklahoma Sooner to win the Heisman Trophy (after Billy Vessels, and preceding Sam Bradford, Jason White, Billy Sims, Baker Mayfield and Kyler Murray). He was the Sooners' all-time scorer with 57 touchdowns until DeMarco Murray beat his record in 2010, and retains the third highest Sooners career rushing total with 4,041 yards.

Owens holds the distinction of executing touchdowns on the first three forward passes of his NCAA career. He also established the career rushing record of 3,867 yards that stood for two years until Ed Marinaro broke it in 1971. His 1967–1969 career points per game record were broken the following season by Arkansas' Bill Burnett.

In 2006, the university erected a bronze statue of Owens on its campus in Heisman Park, commemorating his 1969 award. He was also a member of Kappa Sigma fraternity at OU.

== Professional career ==
The Detroit Lions chose Owens in the first round (19th overall) in the 1970 NFL draft, and he signed in June. He played for the Lions for five seasons, from 1970 to 1974, and struggled with injuries. In his rookie year, he had a severely separated shoulder that kept him out of the season's first half. Healthy, Owens rushed for 1,035 yards in 1971, becoming the first back in the history of the Lions' franchise to run for more than 1,000 yards in a single season, and was selected for the Pro Bowl.

On Thanksgiving in 1974 at Tiger Stadium, Owens opened the game with 46 yards in four carries but went down in the first quarter with ligament damage to his left knee. and sat out the entire 1975 season. He retired during training camp in August 1976, after a series of injuries that plagued his pro career.

== NFL career statistics ==
Legend
**Bold**	Career high

=== Regular season ===
Year	Team	Games		Rushing					Receiving				
Year	Team	GP	GS	Att	Yds	Avg	Lng	TD	Rec	Yds	Avg	Lng	TD
1970	DET	6	1	36	122	3.4	23	2	4	21	5.3	11	0
1971	DET	**14**	**13**	**246**	**1,035**	**4.2**	23	**8**	**32**	**350**	**10.9**	**74**	**2**
1972	DET	10	9	143	519	3.6	18	4	15	100	6.7	15	0
1973	DET	12	8	113	401	3.5	16	3	24	232	9.7	30	0
1974	DET	11	8	97	374	3.9	**27**	3	24	158	6.6	13	0
		53	39	635	2,451	3.9	27	20	99	861	8.7	74	2

=== Playoffs ===
Year	Team	Games		Rushing					Receiving				
Year	Team	GP	GS	Att	Yds	Avg	Lng	TD	Rec	Yds	Avg	Lng	TD
1970	DET	**1**	0	**2**	**9**	**4.5**	**6**	0	**1**	**7**	**7.0**	**7**	0
		1	0	2	9	4.5	6	0	1	7	7.0	7	0

== Life after football ==
Owens served as the athletic director for the Oklahoma Sooners athletic program at his alma mater from August 1996 until March 1998.

== See also ==
- List of NCAA Division I FBS players with at least 50 career rushing touchdowns
- List of NCAA major college football yearly scoring leaders
