= 1971 All-South Independent football team =

American college football season

The 1971 All-South Independent football team consists of American football players chosen by the Associated Press for their All-South independent teams for the 1971 NCAA Division I-A football season.

== Offense ==
Quarterback

- Gary Huff, Florida State

Running backs

- Chuck Foreman, Miami
- Ricky Hebert, Tulane

Wide receivers

- Rhett Dawson, Florida State
- Steve Barrios, Tulane

Tight end

- Mike Oven, Georgia Tech

Tackles

- Rick Lantz, Georgia Tech
- Joe Strickler, Florida State

Guards

- Tom Turchetta, Miami
- Mike Koesling, Tulane

Center

- Jimmy Haynes, Southern Mississippi

== Defense ==
Defensive ends

- Smylie Gebhart, Georgia Tech
- Mike Truax, Tulane

Defensive tackles

- Brad Bourne, Georgia Tech
- Johnny Herros, Southern Mississippi

Linebackers

- Harold Sears, Miami
- Mike Mullen, Tulane
- Larry Strickland, Florida State

Defensive backs

- Jeff Ford, Georgia Tech
- James Thomas, Florida State
- Burgess Owens, Miami
- Joe Bullard, Tulane

== Special teams ==
Kicker

- Frank Fontes, Florida State

Punter

- Ray Guy, Southern Mississippi
