= 1971 Houston Cougars football team =

American college football season

1971 Houston Cougars football

Astro-Bluebonnet Bowl, L 17–29 vs. Colorado
- Conference: Independent

Ranking
- Coaches: No. 14
- AP: No. 17
- Record: 9–3
- Head coach: Bill Yeoman (10th season)
- Offensive scheme: Veer–T
- Defensive coordinator: Melvin Robertson (7th season)
- Captains: Robert Newhouse; Gary Mullins; Frank Ditta
- Home stadium: Houston Astrodome

1971 NCAA University Division independents football records
	Conf.			Overall
Team	W	L	T	W		L		T
No. 5 Penn State		–		11	–	1	–	0
Boston College		–		9	–	2	–	0
No. 17 Houston		–		9	–	3	–	0
No. 13 Notre Dame		–		8	–	2	–	0
Utah State		–		8	–	3	–	0
Florida State		–		8	–	4	–	0
Cincinnati		–		7	–	4	–	0
West Virginia		–		7	–	4	–	0
Temple		–		6	–	2	–	1
Air Force		–		6	–	4	–	0
Army		–		6	–	4	–	0
Colgate		–		6	–	4	–	0
Villanova		–		6	–	4	–	1
South Carolina		–		6	–	5	–	0
Southern Miss		–		6	–	5	–	0
Georgia Tech		–		6	–	6	–	0
Northern Illinois		–		5	–	5	–	1
Syracuse		–		5	–	5	–	1
Dayton		–		5	–	6	–	0
Holy Cross		–		4	–	6	–	0
Miami (FL)		–		4	–	7	–	0
Rutgers		–		4	–	7	–	0
Virginia Tech		–		4	–	7	–	0
Navy		–		3	–	8	–	0
Pittsburgh		–		3	–	8	–	0
Tulane		–		3	–	8	–	0
Marshall		–		2	–	8	–	0
Xavier		–		1	–	9	–	0
Rankings from AP Poll

The 1971 Houston Cougars football team represented the University of Houston during the 1971 NCAA University Division football season. The Cougars, coached by Bill Yeoman in his tenth season, compiled a 9–3 record, and outscored their opponents by a total of 339 to 199. Houston finished ranked No. 17 in the AP Poll after a loss to Colorado in the Astro-Bluebonnet Bowl.

== Schedule ==
Date	Time	Opponent	Rank	Site	TV	Result	Attendance	Source
September 11		at Rice		Rice Stadium; Houston, TX (rivalry)		W 23–21	62,000	
September 18		at No. 16 Arizona State	No. 20	Sun Devil Stadium; Tempe, AZ		L 17–18	50,446	
September 25	7:00 p.m.	at Cincinnati		Nippert Stadium; Cincinnati, OH		W 12–3	12,542	
October 2	7:30 p.m.	San Jose State		Houston Astrodome; Houston, TX		W 34–20	31,754	
October 15	7:30 p.m.	Villanova		Houston Astrodome; Houston, TX		W 42–9	26,709	
October 23		at No. 4 Alabama		Denny Stadium; Tuscaloosa, AL		L 20–34	56,939	
October 30		No. 19 Florida State^{†}		Houston Astrodome; Houston, TX		W 14–7	33,598	
November 6		at Memphis State	No. 19	Memphis Memorial Stadium; Memphis, TN		W 35–7	10,132	
November 13		Virginia Tech	No. 18	Houston Astrodome; Houston, TX		W 56–29	28,105	
November 20	7:30 p.m.	Miami (FL)	No. 16	Houston Astrodome; Houston, TX		W 27–6	29,276	
November 27		Utah	No. 15	Houston Astrodome; Houston, TX		W 42–16	26,618	
December 31		vs. No. 7 Colorado	No. 15	Houston Astrodome; Houston, TX (Astro-Bluebonnet Bowl)	ABC	L 17–29	54,720	
^{†}Homecoming; Rankings from AP Poll released prior to the game; All times are in Central time

== Roster ==
1971 Houston Cougars football team roster
Players
Coaches
Offense

Pos.	#	Name	Class
WR	2	Willie Roberts	Sr
QB	9	Terry Ford	Jr
FB	46	Robert Newhouse	Sr
TE	68	Riley Odoms	Sr

Defense

Pos.	#	Name	Class
CB	1	Willie Walker	So
DT	60	Kent Branstetter	Sr

Special teams

Pos.	#	Name	Class
K	33	Hal Roberts	So

Head coach

- Bill Yeoman

Coordinators/assistant coaches

Legend

- (C) Team captain
- (S) Suspended
- (I) Ineligible
- Injured
- Redshirt
