= 1971 Penn State Nittany Lions football team =

American college football season

1971 Penn State Nittany Lions football

Eastern champion Cotton Bowl champion

Cotton Bowl Classic, W 30–6 vs. Texas
- Conference: Independent

Ranking
- Coaches: No. 11
- AP: No. 5
- Record: 11–1
- Head coach: Joe Paterno (6th season)
- Offensive scheme: I formation
- Defensive coordinator: Jim O'Hora (6th season)
- Base defense: 4–3
- Captains: Dave Joyner; Charlie Zapiec
- Home stadium: Beaver Stadium

1971 NCAA University Division independents football records
	Conf.			Overall
Team	W	L	T	W		L		T
No. 5 Penn State		–		11	–	1	–	0
Boston College		–		9	–	2	–	0
No. 17 Houston		–		9	–	3	–	0
No. 13 Notre Dame		–		8	–	2	–	0
Utah State		–		8	–	3	–	0
Florida State		–		8	–	4	–	0
Cincinnati		–		7	–	4	–	0
West Virginia		–		7	–	4	–	0
Temple		–		6	–	2	–	1
Air Force		–		6	–	4	–	0
Army		–		6	–	4	–	0
Colgate		–		6	–	4	–	0
Villanova		–		6	–	4	–	1
South Carolina		–		6	–	5	–	0
Southern Miss		–		6	–	5	–	0
Georgia Tech		–		6	–	6	–	0
Northern Illinois		–		5	–	5	–	1
Syracuse		–		5	–	5	–	1
Dayton		–		5	–	6	–	0
Holy Cross		–		4	–	6	–	0
Miami (FL)		–		4	–	7	–	0
Rutgers		–		4	–	7	–	0
Virginia Tech		–		4	–	7	–	0
Navy		–		3	–	8	–	0
Pittsburgh		–		3	–	8	–	0
Tulane		–		3	–	8	–	0
Marshall		–		2	–	8	–	0
Xavier		–		1	–	9	–	0
Rankings from AP Poll

The 1971 Penn State Nittany Lions football team represented the Pennsylvania State University as an independent during the 1971 NCAA University Division football season. Led by sixth-year head coach Joe Paterno, the Nittany Lions compiled a record of 11–1 and defeated Texas in the Cotton Bowl Classic. Penn State played home games at Beaver Stadium in University Park, Pennsylvania.

== Schedule ==
Date	Time	Opponent	Rank	Site	TV	Result	Attendance	Source
September 18	2:00 p.m.	at Navy	No. 14	Navy–Marine Corps Memorial Stadium; Annapolis, MD		W 56–3	26,855	
September 25		at Iowa	No. 12	Iowa Stadium; Iowa City, IA	ABC	W 44–14	44,303	
October 2	1:30 p.m.	Air Force	No. 9	Beaver Stadium; University Park, PA		W 16–14	50,459	
October 9	1:30 p.m.	Army	No. 9	Beaver Stadium; University Park, PA		W 42–0	49,887	
October 16		at Syracuse	No. 9	Archbold Stadium; Syracuse, NY (rivalry)		W 31–0	41,382	
October 23		TCU^{†}	No. 7	Beaver Stadium; University Park, PA		W 66–14	51,896	
October 30		at West Virginia	No. 6	Mountaineer Field; Morgantown, WV (rivalry)		W 35–7	37,000	
November 6		Maryland	No. 6	Beaver Stadium; University Park, PA (rivalry)		W 63–27	50,144	
November 13		NC State	No. 5	Beaver Stadium; University Park, PA		W 35–3	50,477	
November 20		at Pittsburgh	No. 6	Pitt Stadium; Pittsburgh, PA (rivalry)		W 55–18	39,539	
December 4		at No. 12 Tennessee	No. 5	Neyland Stadium; Knoxville, TN	ABC	L 11–31	59,542	
January 1, 1972		vs. No. 12 Texas	No. 10	Cotton Bowl; Dallas, TX (Cotton Bowl)	CBS	W 30–6	72,000	
^{†}Homecoming; Rankings from AP Poll released prior to the game; All times are in Eastern time

== Game summaries ==
=== Air Force ===
Alberto Vitiello, a 5 ft 7 in (1.70 m) junior college transfer, kicked a 22-yard field goal with four minutes to help Penn State escape with a 16–14 victory over Air Force.

=== Tennessee ===
#5 Penn State Nittany Lions (10–0) at #12 Tennessee Volunteers (8–2)

Quarter	1	2	3	4	Total
Penn St	0	3	0	8	11
Tennessee	7	14	0	10	31

at Neyland Stadium, Knoxville, Tennessee

- Date: December 4, 1971
- Game attendance: 54,529
- TV: ABC
- Ocala Star-Banner, 1971 Dec 05.

Game information
First quarter
- TENN – Conrad Graham 76-yard fumble return (George Hunt kick). Tennessee 7–0.

Second quarter

- PSU – Alberto Vitello 27-yard field goal. Tennessee 7–3. Drive:
- TENN – Bill Rudder 1-yard run (George Hunt kick). Tennessee 14–3. Drive: 5 plays, 15 yards.
- TENN – Bobby Majors 44-yard punt return (George Hunt kick). Tennessee 21–3.

Fourth quarter

- TENN – George Hunt 21-yard field goal. Tennessee 24–3. Drive:
- TENN – Jackie Walker 43-yard interception return (George Hunt kick). Tennessee 31–3.
- PSU – Lydell Mitchell 14-yard pass from John Hufnagel (run good). Tennessee 31–11. Drive:

== Roster ==
1971 Penn State Nittany Lions football team roster
Players
Coaches
Offense

Pos.	#	Name	Class
RB	26	Ken Andrews	Jr
C	59	Mike Botts	Sr
C	50	Rick Brown	Jr
RB	27	Carl Cayette	Jr
WR	48	Glen Cole	Sr
TE	80	Gary Debes	So
RB	32	Tom Donchez	So
C	56	Don Gersh	Sr
OT	77	Charlie Getty	So
RB	34	Franco Harris	Sr
WR	25	Chuck Herd	So
QB	16	John Hufnagel	Jr
TE	89	John Hull	Sr
QB	10	Steve Joachim	So
OT	70	Dave Joyner (C)	Sr
OL		Bob Knetchel
QB	11	Jack Koniszewski	So
OT	73	Craig Lyle	Jr
RB	23	Lydell Mitchell	Sr
RB	41	Bob Nagle	So
TE, P	86	Bob Parsons	Sr
TE	40	Bob Rickenbach	Sr
G	69	Carl Schaukowitch	Jr
WR	19	Jim Scott	So
WR	84	Scott Skarzynski	Jr
RB		Steve Stilley

Defense

Pos.	#	Name	Class
DT	79	Frank Ahrenhold	Sr
DE	93	Jack Aumiller	Sr
DE	83	Bruce Bannon	Jr
DT	57	John Booth	Sr
DB	22	John Cappelletti	So
DT	53	Randy Crowder	So
S	35	Gregg Ducatte	Jr
DB	18	Buddy Ellis	So
LB	30	Gary Gray	Sr
DL	46	Gary Hager	So
DT	72	Jim Heller	Jr
LB	49	Tom Hull	So
DL	47	Jim Laslavic	Jr
DB	20	Chuck Mesko	Sr
LB	89	Ed O'Neil	So
LB	39	Paul Pasqualoni	Sr
DE	81	John Skorupan	Jr
LB	36	Jim Trent	Jr
LB	60	Charlie Zapiec (C)	Sr

Special teams

Pos.	#	Name	Class
K	37	Alberto Vitello	Jr

Head coach

- Joe Paterno

Coordinators/assistant coaches

- John Chuckran
- Jim O'Hora
- Frank Patrick
- Bob Phillips
- Jerry Sandusky
- Jim Weaver
- George Welsh
- J. T. White

Legend

- (C) Team captain
- (S) Suspended
- (I) Ineligible
- Injured
- Redshirt

Roster

== NFL draft ==
Four Nittany Lions were selected in the 1972 NFL draft.

Round	Pick	Overall	Name	Position	Team
1st	13	13	Franco Harris	Running back	Pittsburgh Steelers
2nd	22	48	Lydell Mitchell	Running back	Baltimore Colts
4th	15	93	Charles Zapiec	Linebacker	Dallas Cowboys
5th	13	117	Bob Parsons	Punter	Chicago Bears
