= Larry Jones (American football coach) =

American football player and coach (1933–2013)

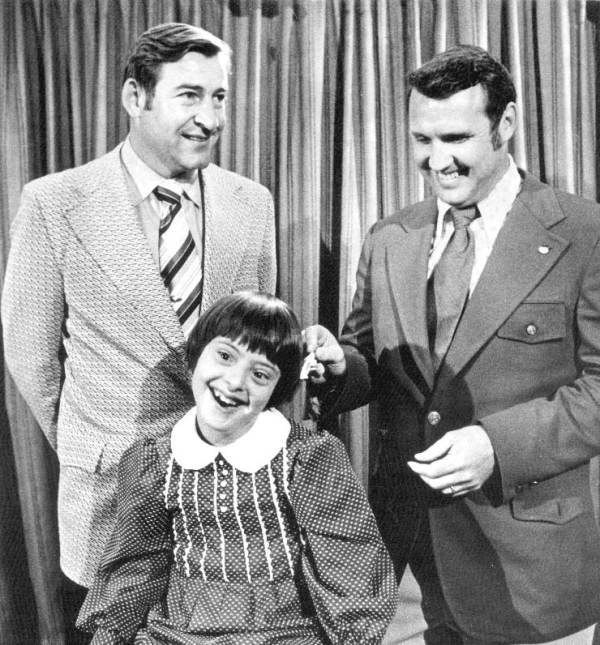
- Jones (right) in 1972

Biographical details
- Born: December 18, 1933; Pottsville, Arkansas, U.S.
- Died: May 30, 2013 (aged 79); Baton Rouge, Louisiana, U.S.

Playing career
- 1951–1953: LSU
- Positions: Linebacker, center

Coaching career (HC unless noted)
- 1958–1961: LSU (OL/WR)
- 1962-1965: Army(assistant)
- 1966-1969: South Carolina(Defensive Coordinator)
- 1970: Tennessee (assistant)
- 1971–1973: Florida State
- 1974–1976: Tennessee (assistant)
- 1977–1978: Kansas (DC/DL)

Administrative career (AD unless noted)
- 1979–1989: LSU (asst. AD)

Head coaching record
- Overall: 15–19
- Bowls: 0–1

Larry Bruce Jones (December 18, 1933 – May 30, 2013) was an American college football player and coach. He served as the head coach at Florida State University from 1971 to 1973, compiling a record of 15–19. A native of Little Rock, Arkansas, Jones played as a linebacker and center at Louisiana State University (LSU). He also served as an assistant coach as his alma mater, LSU, and at the University of South Carolina, the United States Military Academy, the University of Tennessee, and the University of Kansas. Jones returned to LSU in 1979 as assistant athletic director and served two stints (1982 and 1986–1987) as interim AD. From 1989 to 2012, he was the chief fundraiser for the LSU Alumni Association.

Jones died in the morning of May 30, 2013. He was 79.

== Head coaching record ==
Year	Team	Overall	Conference	Standing	Bowl/playoffs
Florida State Seminoles (NCAA University Division / Division I independent) (1971–1973)
1971	Florida State	8–4			L Fiesta
1972	Florida State	7–4			
1973	Florida State	0–11			
Florida State:		15–19			
Total:		15–19			
