= 1971 Toledo Rockets football team =

American college football season

1971 Toledo Rockets football

MAC champion Tangerine Bowl champion

Tangerine Bowl, W 28–3 vs. Richmond
- Conference: Mid-American Conference

Ranking
- Coaches: No. 13
- AP: No. 14
- Record: 12–0 (5–0 MAC)
- Head coach: Jack Murphy (1st season)
- Offensive coordinator: Dave Hardy (4th season)
- Defensive coordinator: Dick Strahm (2nd season)
- Captains: Chuck Ealey; Gary Hinkson; Mel Long
- Home stadium: Glass Bowl

1971 Mid-American Conference football standings
	Conf.					Overall
Team	W		L		T	W		L		T
No. 14 Toledo $	5	–	0	–	0	12	–	0	–	0
Bowling Green	4	–	1	–	0	6	–	4	–	0
Western Michigan	2	–	3	–	0	7	–	3	–	0
Miami (OH)	2	–	3	–	0	7	–	3	–	0
Ohio	2	–	3	–	0	5	–	5	–	0
Kent State	0	–	5	–	0	3	–	8	–	0
$ – Conference champion; Rankings from AP Poll

The 1971 Toledo Rockets football team was an American football team that represented the University of Toledo in the Mid-American Conference (MAC) during the 1971 NCAA University Division football season. In their first season under head coach Jack Murphy, the Rockets compiled a 12–0 record, outscored all opponents by a combined total of 383 to 96, and won the Mid-American Conference (MAC) championship. The season ended with a 28–3 victory over Southern Conference champion Richmond in the 1970 Tangerine Bowl. The Rockets were ranked No. 14 in the final AP Poll and No. 13 in the final UPI Poll.

The 1971 season was part of a 35-game winning streak that consisted of three consecutive seasons from 1969 through 1971. During the streak, Toledo won three consecutive MAC championships and three consecutive bowl games, led the nation in total defense all three years, and outscored opponents by a combined total of 1,152 to 344. It remains the second longest winning streak in modern Division I-A college football history behind Oklahoma's 47-game streak in the 1950s. The defense led the way for the 1971 team, allowing only 164.6 total yards per game, a figure which remains a school record.

Quarterback Chuck Ealey, who had led Toledo to all three undefeated seasons, finished eighth in the 1971 Heisman Trophy voting with 168 points. Ealey was also selected as a first-team All-American by the Football Writers Association of America (FWAA) and Football News. For the third consecutive year, Ealey was also named the MAC Back of the Year. For the second consecutive year, he received the Jim Nicholson Award as the player contributing the most to the team's success.

Defensive tackle Mel Long was a consensus All-American, receiving first-team honors from the Associated Press, FWAA, Newspaper Enterprise Association, and United Press International. Long was the first consensus All-American in MAC history. Long was also named MAC Lineman of the Year for the second consecutive year.

Five Toledo players received first-team All-MAC honors: Chuck Ealey, Mel Long, tailback Joe Schwartz, end Don Fair, tight end Al Baker, defensive end Bob Rose, linebacker John Niezgoda, and defensive backs Gary Hinkson and John Saunders. The team captains were Ealey, Long and Hinkson.

The team's statistical leaders included Chuck Ealey with 1,821 passing yards, Joe Schwartz with 1,130 rushing yards and 120 points scored, Don Fair with 773 receiving yards, and John Niezgoda with 178 tackles.

Jack Murphy had been an assistant coach at Toledo under Frank Lauterbur. After Lauterbur resigned in December 1970 to become head football coach at Iowa, Murphy was named as the new head coach. In his first year as Toledo's head coach, Murphy was named MAC Coach of the Year.

The Rockets played their home game in the Glass Bowl. The attendance at five home games was 98,360, an average of 19,672 per game.

== Schedule ==
Date	Time	Opponent	Rank	Site	Result	Attendance	Source
September 11	7:30 p.m.	at East Carolina*		Ficklen Memorial Stadium; Greenville, NC	W 45–0	15,000	
September 18	8:00 p.m.	Villanova*		Glass Bowl; Toledo, OH	W 10–7	20,012	
September 25	8:32 p.m.	at UT Arlington*	No. 19	Turnpike Stadium; Arlington, TX	W 23–0	8,500	
October 2	8:00 p.m.	Ohio		Glass Bowl; Toledo, OH	W 31–28	21,984	
October 9	1:30 p.m.	at Bowling Green	No. 20	Doyt Perry Stadium; Bowling Green, OH (rivalry)	W 24–7	26,860	
October 16	1:30 p.m.	Western Michigan	No. 17	Glass Bowl; Toledo, OH	W 35–24	18,964	
October 23	8:00 p.m.	Dayton*	No. 14	Glass Bowl; Toledo, OH	W 35–7	17,201	
October 30		at Miami (OH)	No. 15	Miami Field; Oxford, OH	W 45–6	16,013	
November 6	2:30 p.m.	at Northern Illinois*	No. 14	Huskie Stadium; DeKalb, IL	W 23–8	10,339	
November 13	1:35 p.m.	at Marshall*	No. 14	Fairfield Stadium; Huntington, WV	W 43–0	14,750	
November 20	8:00 p.m.	Kent State	No. 13	Glass Bowl; Toledo, OH	W 41–6	20,201	
December 28		vs. Richmond*	No. 14	Tangerine Bowl; Orlando, FL (Tangerine Bowl)	W 28–3	16,750	
*Non-conference game; Rankings from AP Poll released prior to the game; All times are in Eastern time

== Roster ==
1971 Toledo Rockets football team roster
Players
Coaches
Offense

Pos.	#	Name	Class
QB	16	Chuck Ealey	Sr
OT	70	Jim Goodman	Sr
C	64	Scott Johnson	Sr
TE	81	Jim Wells	Jr

Defense

Pos.	#	Name	Class
DT	77	Mel Long	Sr

Special teams

Pos.	#	Name	Class

Head coach

- Jack Murphy

Coordinators/assistant coaches

- Dave Hardy – Offensive coordinator
- Roger Merb – Offensive backs
- Charlie Snyder – Wide receivers
- Dick Strahm – Defensive coordinator
- Irvin Wright – Middle guards/linebackers
- Dan Simrell – Defensive backs
- Chet Fair – Scouting

Legend

- (C) Team captain
- (S) Suspended
- (I) Ineligible
- Injured
- Redshirt

Roster

== After the season ==
=== NFL draft ===
The following Rockets were selected in the 1972 NFL draft following the season.

Round	Pick	Player	Position	NFL club
4	87	John Saunders	Defensive back	Los Angeles Rams
11	278	Mel Long	Linebacker	Cleveland Browns
