= 1971 Florida State Seminoles football team =

American college football season

1971 Florida State Seminoles football

Fiesta Bowl, L 38–45 vs. Arizona State
- Conference: Independent

Ranking
- Coaches: No. 19
- Record: 8–4
- Head coach: Larry Jones (1st season)
- Offensive coordinator: Steve Sloan (1st season)
- Captains: Rhett Dawson; John Lanahan
- Home stadium: Doak Campbell Stadium

1971 NCAA University Division independents football records
	Conf.			Overall
Team	W	L	T	W		L		T
No. 5 Penn State		–		11	–	1	–	0
Boston College		–		9	–	2	–	0
No. 17 Houston		–		9	–	3	–	0
No. 13 Notre Dame		–		8	–	2	–	0
Utah State		–		8	–	3	–	0
Florida State		–		8	–	4	–	0
Cincinnati		–		7	–	4	–	0
West Virginia		–		7	–	4	–	0
Temple		–		6	–	2	–	1
Air Force		–		6	–	4	–	0
Army		–		6	–	4	–	0
Colgate		–		6	–	4	–	0
Villanova		–		6	–	4	–	1
South Carolina		–		6	–	5	–	0
Southern Miss		–		6	–	5	–	0
Georgia Tech		–		6	–	6	–	0
Northern Illinois		–		5	–	5	–	1
Syracuse		–		5	–	5	–	1
Dayton		–		5	–	6	–	0
Holy Cross		–		4	–	6	–	0
Miami (FL)		–		4	–	7	–	0
Rutgers		–		4	–	7	–	0
Virginia Tech		–		4	–	7	–	0
Navy		–		3	–	8	–	0
Pittsburgh		–		3	–	8	–	0
Tulane		–		3	–	8	–	0
Marshall		–		2	–	8	–	0
Xavier		–		1	–	9	–	0
Rankings from AP Poll

The 1971 Florida State Seminoles football team represented Florida State University as an independent during the 1971 NCAA University Division football season. Larry Jones was head coach, Steve Sloan was an assistant coach/offensive coordinator, and Bill Parcells coached the linebackers.

== Schedule ==
Date	Time	Opponent	Rank	Site	TV	Result	Attendance	Source
September 11		vs. Southern Miss		Ernest F. Ladd Memorial Stadium; Mobile, AL		W 24–9	12,133	
September 18	1:52 p.m.	at Miami (FL)		Miami Orange Bowl; Miami, FL (rivalry)	ABC	W 20–17	20,266	
September 25		Kansas		Doak Campbell Stadium; Tallahassee, FL		W 30–7	34,784	
October 2		at Virginia Tech		Lane Stadium; Blacksburg, VA		W 17–3	30,001	
October 9		Mississippi State^{†}		Doak Campbell Stadium; Tallahassee, FL		W 27–9	27,415	
October 16		at Florida	No. 19	Florida Field; Gainesville, FL (rivalry)		L 15–17	65,109	
October 23		South Carolina		Doak Campbell Stadium; Tallahassee, FL		W 49–18	30,764	
October 30		at Houston	No. 19	Astrodome Astrodome; Houston, TX		L 7–14	33,598	
November 13		at Georgia Tech		Grant Field; Atlanta, GA		L 6–12	44,261	
November 20		Tulsa		Doak Campbell Stadium; Tallahassee, FL		W 45–10	20,528	
November 27		Pittsburgh		Doak Campbell Stadium; Tallahassee, FL		W 31–13	19,292	
December 27		vs. No. 8 Arizona State		Sun Devil Stadium; Tempe, AZ (Fiesta Bowl)	Mizlou	L 38–45	51,089	
^{†}Homecoming; Rankings from AP Poll released prior to the game; All times are in Eastern time

== Game summaries ==
=== At Florida ===
Florida State Seminoles at Florida Gators

Quarter	1	2	3	4	Total
Florida St	0	0	0	15	15
Florida	0	14	0	3	17

at Florida Field, Gainesville, Florida

- Date: October 16, 1971
- Game weather: Overcast
- Game attendance: 65,109
- Recap/Box Score

Game information

Second quarter

- FLA – Mike Rich 1-yard run (kick failed), 14:58. Florida 6–0. Drive: 75 yards.
- FLA – Jimmy Barr 26-yard fumble return (pass good), 14:40. Florida 14–0.

Fourth quarter

- FSU – Paul Magalski 3-yard run (Frank Fontes kick), 13:57. Florida 14–7. Drive: 73 yards.
- FLA – Richard Franco 42-yard field goal, 9:19. Florida 17–7. Drive:
- FSU – Rhett Dawson 6-yard pass from Gary Huff (pass good), 3:02. Florida 17–15. Drive:

Top passers

- FSU – Gary Huff – 22/40, 198 yards, TD
- FLA – John Reaves – 4/11, 44 yards

Top rushers

- FSU – Art Munroe – 17 rushes, 79 yards
- FLA – Tommy Durrance – 15 rushes, 60 yards

Top receivers

- FSU – Rhett Dawson – 7 receptions, 90 yards, TD
- FLA – Willie Jackson – 1 reception, 28 yards

== Roster ==
1971 Florida State Seminoles football team roster
Players
Coaches
Offense

Pos.	#	Name	Class
WR	82	Rhett Dawson	Sr
C	55	Allen Dees
WR	18	Kent Gaydos
QB	19	Gary Huff	Jr
FB	48	James Jarrett
G	65	J.W. McKinnie
RB	27	Art Munroe
TE	84	Gary Parris	Jr
WR	22	Barry Smith	Jr
OT	74	Don Sparkman
G	53	Jay Stokes
OT	66	Joe Strickler
TE		Dick Hopkins	Fr

Defense

Pos.	#	Name	Class
DT	75	Richard Amman
S	28	Robert Ashmore
DE	57	Steve Bratton	Jr
DT	70	Bill Henson
DE	50	Charlie Hunt	Jr
S	24	John Lanahan
CB	40	Eddie McMillan	Jr
OLB	60	Clint Parker
DE	85	Bill Shaw
ILB	59	Larry Strickland
CB	26	J.T. Thomas	Jr
OLB	50	Dan Whitehurst

Special teams

Pos.	#	Name	Class
K	1	Frank Fontes

Head coach

- Larry Jones

Coordinators/assistant coaches

- Theron Bass (GA)
- Bill Canty (Freshman)
- John Devlin (DL)
- Al Guy (GA)
- Bob Harbison (OL)
- Gene Henderson (DC/DB)
- Pat Hodgson (WR/TE)
- Doug Jackson (GA)
- Wayne McDuffie (GA)
- Bill Parcells (LB)
- Steve Sloan (OC)
- Hank Small (GA)

Legend

- (C) Team captain
- (S) Suspended
- (I) Ineligible
- Injured
- Redshirt
