= Dick Selcer =

American football player and coach (born 1937)

Biographical details
- Born: August 22, 1937; Cincinnati, Ohio, U.S.

Playing career

Football
- 1956–1958: Notre Dame

Baseball
- 1958–1959: Notre Dame
- Positions: Halfback (football); Second baseman (baseball)

Coaching career (HC unless noted)

Football
- 1962–1964: Xavier (backfield)
- 1965–1966: Cincinnati (backfield/ends)
- 1968–1969: Brown (assistant)
- 1970–1971: Xavier
- 1972–1974: Wisconsin (DB)
- 1975–1977: Kansas State (DC)
- 1978–1980: Southwestern Louisiana (assistant)
- 1981–1985: Houston Oilers (LB)
- 1986–1991: Cincinnati Bengals (LB)
- 1994–1996: Los Angeles / St. Louis Rams (LB)
- 1997–2002: Detroit Lions (LB)

Head coaching record
- Overall: 2–18

Richard James Selcer (born August 22, 1937) is an American former football player and coach. He served as the head football coach at Xavier University in Cincinnati, Ohio from 1970 to 1971, compiling a record of 2–18.

== Head coaching record ==
Year	Team	Overall	Conference	Standing	Bowl/playoffs
Xavier Musketeers (NCAA University Division independent) (1970–1971)
1970	Xavier	1–9			
1971	Xavier	1–9			
Xavier:		2–18			
Total:		2–18			
