= 1971 Marshall Thundering Herd football team =

American college football season

1971 Marshall Thundering Herd football
- Conference: Independent
- Record: 2–8
- Head coach: Jack Lengyel (1st season)
- Offensive scheme: Veer
- Defensive coordinator: William "Red" Dawson (4th season)
- Captain: Nate Ruffin
- Home stadium: Fairfield Stadium

1971 NCAA University Division independents football records
	Conf.			Overall
Team	W	L	T	W		L		T
No. 5 Penn State		–		11	–	1	–	0
Boston College		–		9	–	2	–	0
No. 17 Houston		–		9	–	3	–	0
No. 13 Notre Dame		–		8	–	2	–	0
Utah State		–		8	–	3	–	0
Florida State		–		8	–	4	–	0
Cincinnati		–		7	–	4	–	0
West Virginia		–		7	–	4	–	0
Temple		–		6	–	2	–	1
Air Force		–		6	–	4	–	0
Army		–		6	–	4	–	0
Colgate		–		6	–	4	–	0
Villanova		–		6	–	4	–	1
South Carolina		–		6	–	5	–	0
Southern Miss		–		6	–	5	–	0
Georgia Tech		–		6	–	6	–	0
Northern Illinois		–		5	–	5	–	1
Syracuse		–		5	–	5	–	1
Dayton		–		5	–	6	–	0
Holy Cross		–		4	–	6	–	0
Miami (FL)		–		4	–	7	–	0
Rutgers		–		4	–	7	–	0
Virginia Tech		–		4	–	7	–	0
Navy		–		3	–	8	–	0
Pittsburgh		–		3	–	8	–	0
Tulane		–		3	–	8	–	0
Marshall		–		2	–	8	–	0
Xavier		–		1	–	9	–	0
Rankings from AP Poll

The 1971 Marshall Thundering Herd football team (sometimes referred to as the Young Thundering Herd) represented Marshall University as an independent during the 1971 NCAA University Division football season. Led by first-year head coach Jack Lengyel, the Thundering Herd compiled a record of 2–8. Nate Ruffin was the team captain. Marshall played home games at Fairfield Stadium in Huntington, West Virginia.

== Schedule ==
Date	Time	Opponent	Site	Result	Attendance	Source
September 18		at Morehead State	Jayne Stadium; Morehead, KY	L 6–29	11,000	
September 25	1:30 p.m.	Xavier	Fairfield Stadium; Huntington, WV	W 15–13	13,000	
October 2		at Miami (OH)	Miami Field; Oxford, OH	L 6–66	12,649	
October 9	8:30 p.m.	at Northern Illinois	Huskie Stadium; DeKalb, IL	L 18–33	11,800	
October 16	1:30 p.m.	Dayton	Fairfield Stadium; Huntington, WV	L 0–13	10,750	
October 23	1:35 p.m.	at Western Michigan	Waldo Stadium; Kalamazoo, MI	L 0–37	21,200	
October 30	1:30 p.m.	Bowling Green^{†}	Fairfield Stadium; Huntington, WV	W 12–10	14,110	
November 6	1:30 p.m.	at Kent State	Memorial Stadium; Kent, OH	L 0–21	6,844–6,884	
November 13	1:35 p.m.	No. 14 Toledo	Fairfield Stadium; Huntington, WV	L 0–43	14,750	
November 20	1:30 p.m.	Ohio	Fairfield Stadium; Huntington, WV (rivalry)	L 0–30	10,100	
^{†}Homecoming; Rankings from AP Poll released prior to the game; All times are in Eastern time

== Before the season ==
=== Previous season ===
On November 14, 1970, Southern Airways Flight 932, which was chartered by the school to fly the 1970 Marshall Thundering Herd football team and fans to Greenville, North Carolina for a game against the East Carolina Pirates and back to Huntington, West Virginia, crashed on approach to Tri-State Airport after clipping trees just west of the runway and impacting nose-first into a hollow. All 75 people on board died. It was the worst single air tragedy in NCAA sports history. The 1970 Marshall University football team was coached by Rick Tolley and finished with a record of 3–6.

=== New coaching staff ===
Marshall lost much of their coaching staff and their athletic director in the crash. Joe McMullen was hired to be the new AD. Georgia Tech assistant coach Dick Bestwick was hired to be the head coach. However, after two days he returned to Georgia Tech. William "Red" Dawson was named acting head coach, and later signed 21 prospects from five states. Wooster coach Jack Lengyel was eventually hired to fill the position. Dawson, an assistant coach, had gone on a recruiting trip instead of flying back with the team after the ECU game in 1970, and Lengyel convinced him to stay around for the 1971 season, providing some continuity. Dawson would retire from coaching following the season.

=== Freshmen eligibility waiver ===
Prior to and during the 1971 season the NCAA did not allow freshmen to compete in varsity football. Marshall requested and was granted a waiver to allow freshmen to compete so that they could field a complete team. Due to the age of the players on the team coach Lengyel nicknamed them the Young Thundering Herd. Beginning with the 1972 season the NCAA allowed freshmen to compete for all varsity football teams.

=== Construction of the roster ===
In addition to the true freshmen who were allowed to play the roster featured three players from the previous year's varsity team. Defensive backs Felix Jordan and Nate Ruffin had both missed the ECU game due to injuries, and defensive lineman Eddie Carter had missed the ECU game due to personal matters. As freshmen had not been allowed to play on the varsity team in 1970, the 1971 roster also had many sophomores that had been recruited to Marshall.

Aside from nine players who did not board the flight, the 1971 team consisted of walk-ons, former servicemen and three basketball players who had used their fifth year of eligibility to play for the football team. 50 players tried out for the team, with 35 being accepted as walk-ons. Lengyel dubbed his team the "Young Thundering Herd," and to motivate the team, President Richard Nixon wrote, "Friends across the land will be rooting for you, but whatever the season brings, you have already won your greatest victory by putting the 1971 varsity on the field." The letter was later read by Lengyel to the team at the first day of practice.

The team did not have a placekicker and held tryouts. Blake Smith, who had never attended a football game, would ultimately win the job.

== Coaching staff ==
- Jack Lengyel, Head coach
- William "Red" Dawson, defensive coordinator
- Jim McNally, Offensive line
- Mickey Jackson, Receivers
- Bill Urbanik, Defensive line

== The season ==
For the season opener, the team visited the Morehead State Eagles for the I-64 Rivalry. Despite losing 29–6, the Herd managed to score late in the game with Reggie Oliver's touchdown pass to Tom Smyth, prompting a standing ovation from the crowd.

== We Are Marshall ==
The event and its aftermath were dramatized in the 2006 Warner Brothers motion picture, We Are Marshall, starring Matthew McConaughey as Jack Lengyel and Matthew Fox as Red Dawson.
