= 1971 Xavier Musketeers football team =

American college football season

1971 Xavier Musketeers football
- Conference: Independent
- Record: 1–9
- Head coach: Dick Selcer (2nd season)
- Home stadium: Xavier Stadium

1971 NCAA University Division independents football records
	Conf.			Overall
Team	W	L	T	W		L		T
No. 5 Penn State		–		11	–	1	–	0
Boston College		–		9	–	2	–	0
No. 17 Houston		–		9	–	3	–	0
No. 13 Notre Dame		–		8	–	2	–	0
Utah State		–		8	–	3	–	0
Florida State		–		8	–	4	–	0
Cincinnati		–		7	–	4	–	0
West Virginia		–		7	–	4	–	0
Temple		–		6	–	2	–	1
Air Force		–		6	–	4	–	0
Army		–		6	–	4	–	0
Colgate		–		6	–	4	–	0
Villanova		–		6	–	4	–	1
South Carolina		–		6	–	5	–	0
Southern Miss		–		6	–	5	–	0
Georgia Tech		–		6	–	6	–	0
Northern Illinois		–		5	–	5	–	1
Syracuse		–		5	–	5	–	1
Dayton		–		5	–	6	–	0
Holy Cross		–		4	–	6	–	0
Miami (FL)		–		4	–	7	–	0
Rutgers		–		4	–	7	–	0
Virginia Tech		–		4	–	7	–	0
Navy		–		3	–	8	–	0
Pittsburgh		–		3	–	8	–	0
Tulane		–		3	–	8	–	0
Marshall		–		2	–	8	–	0
Xavier		–		1	–	9	–	0
Rankings from AP Poll

The 1971 Xavier Musketeers football team was an American football team that represented Xavier University as an independent during the 1971 NCAA University Division football season. In their second year under head coach Dick Selcer, the Musketeers compiled a 1–9 record.

== Schedule ==
Date	Time	Opponent	Site	Result	Attendance	Source
September 18	8:00 p.m.	Miami (OH)	Xavier Stadium; Cincinnati, OH	L 7–17	11,102	
September 25	1:30 p.m.	at Marshall	Fairfield Stadium; Huntington, WV	L 13–15	13,000	
October 2		Quantico Marines	Xavier Stadium; Cincinnati, OH	L 6–24	5,785	
October 9	8:00 p.m.	at Cincinnati	Nippert Stadium; Cincinnati, OH (rivalry)	L 7–30	13,082	
October 16	8:00 p.m.	at Temple	Temple Stadium; Philadelphia, PA	L 0–38	9,500	
October 23	2:00 p.m.	Kent State	Xavier Stadium; Cincinnati, OH	L 13–24	3,250–3,255	
October 30	8:00 p.m.	Villanova	Xavier Stadium; Cincinnati, OH	L 27–33	3,044	
November 6	2:05 p.m.	Dayton	Xavier Stadium; Cincinnati, OH	L 10–20	2,116	
November 13	1:30 p.m.	at Bowling Green	Doyt Perry Stadium; Bowling Green, OH	W 42–27	15,811	
November 20	2:30 p.m.	at Northern Illinois	Huskie Stadium; DeKalb, IL	L 9–14	11,658	
All times are in Eastern time
