= 1971 Ohio Bobcats football team =

American college football season

1971 Ohio Bobcats football
- Conference: Mid-American Conference
- Record: 5–5 (2–3 MAC)
- Head coach: Bill Hess (14th season)
- Home stadium: Peden Stadium

1971 Mid-American Conference football standings
	Conf.					Overall
Team	W		L		T	W		L		T
No. 14 Toledo $	5	–	0	–	0	12	–	0	–	0
Bowling Green	4	–	1	–	0	6	–	4	–	0
Western Michigan	2	–	3	–	0	7	–	3	–	0
Miami (OH)	2	–	3	–	0	7	–	3	–	0
Ohio	2	–	3	–	0	5	–	5	–	0
Kent State	0	–	5	–	0	3	–	8	–	0
$ – Conference champion; Rankings from AP Poll

The 1971 Ohio Bobcats football team was an American football team that represented Ohio University in the Mid-American Conference (MAC) during the 1971 NCAA University Division football season. In their 14th season under head coach Bill Hess, the Bobcats compiled a 5–5 record (2–3 against MAC opponents), finished in a tie for third place, and outscored all opponents by a combined total of 240 to 173. They played their home games in Peden Stadium in Athens, Ohio.

== Schedule ==
Date	Time	Opponent	Site	Result	Attendance	Source
September 18	1:30 p.m.	Bowling Green	Peden Stadium; Athens, OH	L 19–20	15,600	
September 25	1:50 p.m.	Kent State	Peden Stadium; Athens, OH	W 37–21	16,781	
October 2	8:00 p.m.	at Toledo	Glass Bowl; Toledo, OH	L 28–31	21,984	
October 9	7:58 p.m.	at Kentucky*	McLean Stadium; Lexington, KY	W 35–6	30,000	
October 16		at Miami (OH)	Miami Field; Oxford, OH (rivalry)	W 3–0	16,954	
October 23	1:31 p.m.	at Virginia Tech*	Lane Stadium; Blacksburg, VA	L 29–37	30,000	
October 30	1:30 p.m.	Western Michigan	Peden Stadium; Athens, OH	L 14–28	18,182	
November 6	3:03 p.m.	at Tulane*	Tulane Stadium; New Orleans, LA	W 30–7	9,922	
November 13	1:30 p.m.	Cincinnati*	Peden Stadium; Athens, OH	L 15–23	18,172	
November 20	1:30 p.m.	at Marshall*	Fairfield Stadium; Huntington, WV (rivalry)	W 30–0	10,100	
*Non-conference game; All times are in Eastern time
