= 1971 Kent State Golden Flashes football team =

American college football season

1971 Kent State Golden Flashes football
- Conference: Mid-American Conference
- Record: 3–8 (0–5 MAC)
- Head coach: Don James (1st season)
- Offensive coordinator: Dick Scesniak (1st season)
- Defensive coordinator: Dennis Fitzgerald (1st season)
- Home stadium: Dix Stadium

1971 Mid-American Conference football standings
	Conf.					Overall
Team	W		L		T	W		L		T
No. 14 Toledo $	5	–	0	–	0	12	–	0	–	0
Bowling Green	4	–	1	–	0	6	–	4	–	0
Western Michigan	2	–	3	–	0	7	–	3	–	0
Miami (OH)	2	–	3	–	0	7	–	3	–	0
Ohio	2	–	3	–	0	5	–	5	–	0
Kent State	0	–	5	–	0	3	–	8	–	0
$ – Conference champion; Rankings from AP Poll

The 1971 Kent State Golden Flashes football team was an American football team that represented Kent State University in the Mid-American Conference (MAC) during the 1971 NCAA University Division football season. In their first season under head coach Don James, the Golden Flashes compiled a 3–8 record (0–5 against MAC opponents), finished in sixth place in the MAC, and were outscored by a total of 304 to 169.

The team's statistical leaders included Renard Harmon with 566 rushing yards, Larry Hayes with 848 passing yards, and Jeff Murrey with 259 receiving yards. On defense, Jack Lambert led the team with 155 total tackles, including 68 solo tackles. Other notable players on the team included Nick Saban and Gary Pinkel.

Don James was announced as Kent State's football coach on December 12, 1970, following the resignation of Dave Puddington. Prior to being hired by Kent State, James was a defensive coach for Colorado.

== Schedule ==
Date	Time	Opponent	Site	Result	Attendance	Source
September 11	7:30 p.m.	at NC State*	Carter Stadium; Raleigh, NC	W 23–21	24,300	
September 18	8:00 p.m.	at Cincinnati*	Nippert Stadium; Cincinnati, OH	L 20–42	7,329	
September 25	1:50 p.m.	at Ohio	Peden Stadium; Athens, OH	L 21–37	16,781	
October 2	1:30 p.m.	Iowa State*	Memorial Stadium; Kent, OH	L 14–17	11,511–11,551	
October 9	1:30 p.m.	at Western Michigan	Waldo Stadium; Kalamazoo, MI	L 0–31	17,200	
October 16	1:30 p.m.	Bowling Green	Memorial Stadium; Kent, OH (rivalry)	L 33–46	13,643	
October 23	2:00 p.m.	at Xavier*	Corcoran Stadium; Cincinnati, OH	W 24–13	3,250–3,255	
October 30	1:30 p.m.	Northern Illinois*	Memorial Stadium; Kent, OH	L 7–26	10,545	
November 6	1:30 p.m.	Marshall*	Memorial Stadium; Kent, OH	W 21–0	6,844–6,884	
November 13	1:30 p.m.	Miami (OH)	Memorial Stadium; Kent, OH	L 0–30	7,963–7,967	
November 20	8:00 p.m.	at No. 13 Toledo	Glass Bowl; Toledo, OH	L 6–41	20,201	
*Non-conference game; Rankings from AP Poll released prior to the game; All times are in Eastern time

== Roster ==
1971 Kent State Golden Flashes football team roster
Players
Coaches
Offense

Pos.	#	Name	Class
RB		Renard Harmon
QB	14	Larry Hayes	Jr
TE		Gary Pinkel

Defense

Pos.	#	Name	Class
DT	72	Pete Jepson	So
DE	77	Jack Lambert	So
SS	12	Nick Saban	Jr

Special teams

Pos.	#	Name	Class

Head coach

- Don James

Coordinators/assistant coaches

Legend

- (C) Team captain
- (S) Suspended
- (I) Ineligible
- Injured
- Redshirt

Roster
