= 1972 Cotton Bowl Classic =

- 36th Cotton Bowl Classic
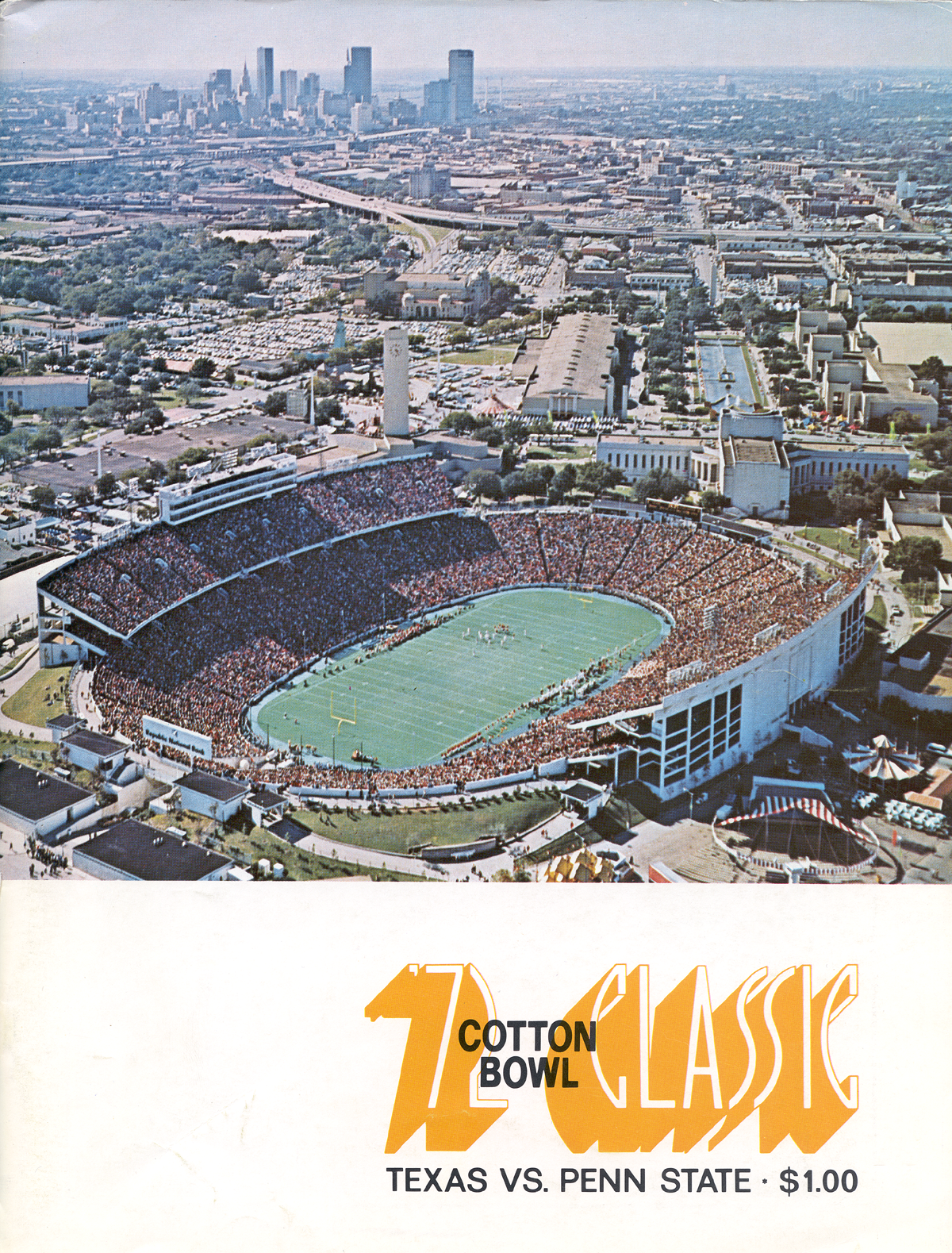
Penn State Nittany Lions	Texas Longhorns
(10–1)	(8–2)
Independent	SWC
30	6
Head coach: Joe Paterno	Head coach: Darrell Royal
AP / Coaches; 10 / 11	AP / Coaches; 12 / 12
	1	2	3	4	Total
Penn State	0	3	17	10	30
Texas	3	3	0	0	6
- Date: January 1, 1972
- Season: 1971
- Stadium: Cotton Bowl
- Location: Dallas, Texas
- MVP: DE Bruce Bannon (Penn State); RB Lydell Mitchell (Penn State)
- Referee: Paul Bertha (ECAC; split crew: ECAC, SWC)
- Attendance: 70,000

United States TV coverage
- Network: CBS

The Cotton Bowl in Dallas, Texas, hosted the Cotton Bowl Classic.

The 1972 Cotton Bowl Classic was a college football bowl game between the Penn State Nittany Lions and the Texas Longhorns. The 36th Cotton Bowl Classic, it was played on Saturday, January 1, 1972, at the Cotton Bowl in Dallas, Texas.

== Background ==
The Texas Longhorns repeated as Southwest Conference champions and were ranked third in the polls in early October, but consecutive losses (to rival Oklahoma in the Cotton Bowl and to #15 Arkansas in Little Rock) dropped them to 3–2 and out of national title contention. Texas won its next five games to gain their fourth straight appearance in the Cotton Bowl, all as SWC champion.

The independent Nittany Lions had climbed to 10–0 and fifth in the rankings before the last game of the regular season, a 31–11 upset loss at #12 Tennessee on December 4. (That loss left only Nebraska, Alabama, and Michigan as undefeated, and the first two met for the national title in the Orange Bowl in Miami.) It was Penn State's first Cotton Bowl in 24 years, since 1948.

== Game summary ==
The teams traded field goals and Texas led 6–3 at halftime, but the Nittany Lions scored 27 unanswered points in the second half. Penn State running back Lydell Mitchell and quarterback John Hufnagel had touchdown runs while Hufnagel threw a touchdown pass to Scott Skarzynski. Alberto Vitiello had three field goals for the Lions while Steve Valek kicked two for Texas, their only scoring.

The convincing win pushed Penn State back up to fifth for the final AP poll, while Texas fell to 18th.

== Aftermath ==
The Longhorns went to three more Cotton Bowls in the 1970s, while Penn State returned three years later.

== Statistics ==
Statistics	PSU	Texas
First downs	18	15
Yards rushing	239	159
Yards passing	137	83
Total yards	376	242
Punts-Average	5-36.0	5-33.0
Fumbles-Lost	1-0	5-3
Interceptions	1	0
Penalties-Yards	2-30	1-5
