= 1971 Western Michigan Broncos football team =

American college football season

1971 Western Michigan Broncos football
- Conference: Mid-American Conference
- Record: 7–3 (2–3 MAC)
- Head coach: Bill Doolittle (8th season)
- MVP: Tom Elias
- Captains: Ted Grignon; Tom Elias
- Home stadium: Waldo Stadium

1971 Mid-American Conference football standings
	Conf.					Overall
Team	W		L		T	W		L		T
No. 14 Toledo $	5	–	0	–	0	12	–	0	–	0
Bowling Green	4	–	1	–	0	6	–	4	–	0
Western Michigan	2	–	3	–	0	7	–	3	–	0
Miami (OH)	2	–	3	–	0	7	–	3	–	0
Ohio	2	–	3	–	0	5	–	5	–	0
Kent State	0	–	5	–	0	3	–	8	–	0
$ – Conference champion; Rankings from AP Poll

The 1971 Western Michigan Broncos football team represented Western Michigan University in the Mid-American Conference (MAC) during the 1971 NCAA University Division football season. In their eighth season under head coach Bill Doolittle, the Broncos compiled a 7–3 record (2–3 against MAC opponents), finished in fourth place in the MAC, and outscored their opponents, 228 to 124. The team played its home games at Waldo Stadium in Kalamazoo, Michigan.

The team's statistical leaders included Ted Grignon with 912 passing yards, Larry Cates with 819 rushing yards, and Keith Pretty with 352 receiving yards. Quarterback Ted Grignon and linebacker Tom Elias were the team captains. Elias also received the team's most outstanding player award.

== Schedule ==
Date	Time	Opponent	Site	Result	Attendance	Source
September 11	1:30 p.m.	Illinois State*	Waldo Stadium; Kalamazoo, MI	W 35–7	17,300	
September 18	1:30 p.m.	at Ball State*	Ball State Stadium; Muncie, IN	W 9–0	15,950	
September 25	1:30 p.m.	Northern Illinois*	Waldo Stadium; Kalamazoo, MI	W 27–17	18,900	
October 2	1:30 p.m.	at Bowling Green	Doyt Perry Stadium; Bowling Green, OH	L 6–23	15,585	
October 9	1:30 p.m.	Kent State	Waldo Stadium; Kalamazoo, MI	W 31–0	17,200	
October 16	1:30 p.m.	at No. 17 Toledo	Glass Bowl; Toledo, OH	L 24–35	18,964	
October 23	1:35 p.m.	Marshall*	Waldo Stadium; Kalamazoo, MI	W 37–0	21,200	
October 30	1:30 p.m.	at Ohio	Peden Stadium; Athens, OH	W 28–14	18,182	
November 6	1:30 p.m.	Miami (OH)	Waldo Stadium; Kalamazoo, MI	L 6–7	12,000	
November 13	1:30 p.m.	Pacific (CA)*	Waldo Stadium; Kalamazoo, MI	W 25–21	18,000	
*Non-conference game; Rankings from AP Poll released prior to the game; All times are in Eastern time
