= 1971 Bowling Green Falcons football team =

American college football season

1971 Bowling Green Falcons football
- Conference: Mid-American Conference
- Record: 6–4 (4–1 MAC)
- Head coach: Don Nehlen (4th season)
- Defensive coordinator: Gary Tranquill (1st season)
- Home stadium: Doyt Perry Stadium

1971 Mid-American Conference football standings
	Conf.					Overall
Team	W		L		T	W		L		T
No. 14 Toledo $	5	–	0	–	0	12	–	0	–	0
Bowling Green	4	–	1	–	0	6	–	4	–	0
Western Michigan	2	–	3	–	0	7	–	3	–	0
Miami (OH)	2	–	3	–	0	7	–	3	–	0
Ohio	2	–	3	–	0	5	–	5	–	0
Kent State	0	–	5	–	0	3	–	8	–	0
$ – Conference champion; Rankings from AP Poll

The 1971 Bowling Green Falcons football team was an American football team that represented Bowling Green University in the Mid-American Conference (MAC) during the 1971 NCAA University Division football season. In their fourth season under head coach Don Nehlen, the Falcons compiled a 6–4 record (4–1 against MAC opponents) and outscored their opponents by a combined total of 263 to 207.

The team's statistical leaders included Reid Lamport with 1,006 passing yards, Paul Miles with 1,185 rushing yards, and Rick Newman with 443 receiving yards.

== Schedule ==
Date	Time	Opponent	Site	Result	Attendance	Source
September 18	1:30 p.m.	at Ohio	Peden Stadium; Athens, OH	W 20–19	15,600	
September 25	1:30 p.m.	East Carolina*	Doyt Perry Stadium; Bowling Green, OH	W 47–21	14,689	
October 2	1:30 p.m.	Western Michigan	Doyt Perry Stadium; Bowling Green, OH	W 23–6	15,585	
October 9	1:30 p.m.	No. 20 Toledo	Doyt Perry Stadium; Bowling Green, OH (rivalry)	L 7–24	26,860	
October 16	1:30 p.m.	at Kent State	Memorial Stadium; Kent, OH (rivalry)	W 46–33	13,643	
October 23	1:30 p.m.	Miami (OH)	Doyt Perry Stadium; Bowling Green, OH	W 33–7	17,787	
October 30	1:30 p.m.	at Marshall*	Fairfield Stadium; Huntington, WV	L 10–12	14,110	
November 6	8:30 p.m.	at UT Arlington*	Turnpike Stadium; Arlington, TX	W 34–17	1,000	
November 13	1:30 p.m.	Xavier*	Doyt Perry Stadium; Bowling Green, OH	L 27–42	15,811	
November 20	1:30 p.m.	at Dayton*	Baujan Field; Dayton, OH	L 16–26	7,257	
*Non-conference game; Rankings from Coaches' Poll released prior to the game; All times are in Eastern time
