= 1971 Miami Redskins football team =

American college football season

1971 Miami Redskins football
- Conference: Mid-American Conference
- Record: 7–3 (2–3 MAC)
- Head coach: Bill Mallory (3rd season)
- MVP: Doug Krause
- Captains: Doug Krause; Dick Dougherty; Marc Smith
- Home stadium: Miami Field

1971 Mid-American Conference football standings
	Conf.					Overall
Team	W		L		T	W		L		T
No. 14 Toledo $	5	–	0	–	0	12	–	0	–	0
Bowling Green	4	–	1	–	0	6	–	4	–	0
Western Michigan	2	–	3	–	0	7	–	3	–	0
Miami (OH)	2	–	3	–	0	7	–	3	–	0
Ohio	2	–	3	–	0	5	–	5	–	0
Kent State	0	–	5	–	0	3	–	8	–	0
$ – Conference champion; Rankings from AP Poll

The 1971 Miami Redskins football team was an American football team that represented Miami University in the Mid-American Conference (MAC) during the 1971 NCAA University Division football season. In their third season under head coach Bill Mallory, Miami compiled a 7–3 record (2–3 against MAC opponents), finished in a tie for third place in the MAC, and outscored all opponents by a combined total of 207 to 117. The team's defense allowed only 11.7 points per game, which ranked 12th among 128 NCAA University Division football teams.

The team's statistical leaders included Stu Showalter with 464 passing yards, Bob Hitchens with 1,157 rushing yards, and John Viher with 251 receiving yards.

Middle guard Doug Krause won the Miami most valuable player award. Krause, Dick Dougherty, and Marc Smith were the team captains.

== Schedule ==
Date	Time	Opponent	Site	Result	Attendance	Source
September 11	10:30 p.m.	at Pacific (CA)*	Pacific Memorial Stadium; Stockton, CA	W 17–10	20,011	
September 18	8:00 p.m.	at Xavier*	Xavier Stadium; Cincinnati, OH	W 17–7	11,102	
September 25	7:30 p.m.	at Dayton*	Baujan Field; Dayton, OH	W 14–0	7,929	
October 2		Marshall*	Miami Field; Oxford, OH	W 66–6	12,649	
October 16		Ohio	Miami Field; Oxford, OH (rivalry)	L 0–3	16,954	
October 23	1:30 p.m.	at Bowling Green	Doyt Perry Stadium; Bowling Green, OH	L 7–33	17,787	
October 30	1:30 p.m.	No. 15 Toledo	Miami Field; Oxford, OH	L 6–45	16,013	
November 6	1:30 p.m.	at Western Michigan	Waldo Stadium; Kalamazoo, MI	W 7–6	12,000	
November 13	1:30 p.m.	at Kent State	Memorial Stadium; Kent, OH	W 30–0	7,963–7,967	
November 20		Cincinnati*	Miami Field; Oxford, OH (rivalry)	W 43–7	9,123	
*Non-conference game; Rankings from AP Poll released prior to the game; All times are in Eastern time
