= 1971 Virginia Tech Gobblers football team =

American college football season

1971 Virginia Tech Gobblers football
- Conference: Independent
- Record: 4–7
- Head coach: Charlie Coffey (1st season)
- Offensive coordinator: Dan Henning (1st season)
- Home stadium: Lane Stadium

1971 NCAA University Division independents football records
	Conf.			Overall
Team	W	L	T	W		L		T
No. 5 Penn State		–		11	–	1	–	0
Boston College		–		9	–	2	–	0
No. 17 Houston		–		9	–	3	–	0
No. 13 Notre Dame		–		8	–	2	–	0
Utah State		–		8	–	3	–	0
Florida State		–		8	–	4	–	0
Cincinnati		–		7	–	4	–	0
West Virginia		–		7	–	4	–	0
Temple		–		6	–	2	–	1
Air Force		–		6	–	4	–	0
Army		–		6	–	4	–	0
Colgate		–		6	–	4	–	0
Villanova		–		6	–	4	–	1
South Carolina		–		6	–	5	–	0
Southern Miss		–		6	–	5	–	0
Georgia Tech		–		6	–	6	–	0
Northern Illinois		–		5	–	5	–	1
Syracuse		–		5	–	5	–	1
Dayton		–		5	–	6	–	0
Holy Cross		–		4	–	6	–	0
Miami (FL)		–		4	–	7	–	0
Rutgers		–		4	–	7	–	0
Virginia Tech		–		4	–	7	–	0
Navy		–		3	–	8	–	0
Pittsburgh		–		3	–	8	–	0
Tulane		–		3	–	8	–	0
Marshall		–		2	–	8	–	0
Xavier		–		1	–	9	–	0
Rankings from AP Poll

The 1971 Virginia Tech Gobblers football team was an American football team that represented Virginia Tech as an independent during the 1971 NCAA University Division football season. The Gobblers finished the 1971 season with a record of 4–7 under first-year head coach Charlie Coffey. Virginia Tech featured one of the nation's most prolific passing offenses, led by junior quarterback Don Strock, who completed 195 of 356 passes for 2,577 yards and 12 touchdowns. Fullback Tommy Barber anchored the ground game with 93 carries for 501 rushing yards, averaging 5.4 yards per attempt. Wide receiver Mike Scales was Strock's top target, contributing multiple touchdown receptions throughout the season. Despite scoring 30 or more points in five games, the team struggled defensively, allowing over 33 points per game. The season included high-scoring losses to Tulsa and Houston, a shutout win over VMI, and a 6–0 road victory over rival Virginia. The Gobblers played as an independent and hosted home games at Lane Stadium in Blacksburg, Virginia.

== Schedule ==
Date	Time	Opponent	Site	Result	Attendance	Source
September 18		Wake Forest	Lane Stadium; Blacksburg, VA	L 9–20	28,000	
September 25		at Oklahoma State	Lewis Field; Stillwater, OK	L 16–24	23,500	
October 2		Florida State	Lane Stadium; Blacksburg, VA	L 3–17	30,001	
October 9		at Tulsa	Skelly Field; Tulsa, OK	L 39–46	21,500	
October 16		William & Mary	Lane Stadium; Blacksburg, VA	W 41–30	20,000	
October 23	1:31 p.m.	Ohio^{†}	Lane Stadium; Blacksburg, VA	W 37–29	30,000	
October 30		at Kentucky	McLean Stadium; Lexington, KY	L 27–33	37,000	
November 6		at Virginia	Scott Stadium; Charlottesville, VA (rivalry)	W 6–0	30,100	
November 13		at No. 18 Houston	Houston Astrodome; Houston, TX	L 29–56	28,105	
November 20		Southern Miss	Lane Stadium; Blacksburg, VA	L 8–17	22,000	
November 27		vs. VMI	Victory Stadium; Roanoke, VA (rivalry)	W 34–0	5,500	
^{†}Homecoming; Rankings from AP Poll released prior to the game; All times are in Eastern time

== Game summaries ==
=== September 18 – vs. Wake Forest ===
Virginia Tech opened the season with a 20–9 loss to Wake Forest at Lane Stadium. Quarterback Don Strock threw for 183 yards and one touchdown to wide receiver Mike Scales. Kicker Dave Strock added a 32-yard field goal. The Gobblers led 9–7 at halftime, but Wake Forest scored two fourth-quarter touchdowns to secure the win.

=== September 25 – at Oklahoma State ===
Virginia Tech fell 24–16 to Oklahoma State in Stillwater. Don Strock threw for 205 yards and a touchdown to Ken Edwards, while Dave Strock kicked three field goals. The Gobblers trailed 17–0 early but narrowed the gap in the second half before a late Cowboys touchdown sealed the game.

=== October 2 – vs. Florida State ===
Virginia Tech lost 17–3 to Florida State at Lane Stadium. Dave Strock kicked a 27-yard field goal in the second quarter, but the Seminoles controlled the game behind quarterback Gary Huff, who completed 21 of 25 passes.

=== October 9 – at Tulsa ===
Virginia Tech dropped a 46–39 shootout to Tulsa at Skelly Stadium. Don Strock threw for 312 yards and four touchdowns—two to Mike Scales and one each to Ken Edwards and Bob Smith. Fullback Tommy Barber added a rushing touchdown, and Dave Strock kicked a 34-yard field goal.

=== October 16 – vs. William & Mary ===
Virginia Tech defeated William & Mary 41–30 at Lane Stadium. Don Strock passed for 285 yards and three touchdowns—two to Mike Scales and one to Ken Edwards. Tommy Barber rushed for two touchdowns, and Dave Strock added a 40-yard field goal.

=== October 23 – vs. Ohio ===
Virginia Tech earned a 37–29 win over Ohio at Lane Stadium. Don Strock threw for 298 yards and three touchdowns—two to Mike Scales and one to Bob Smith. Tommy Barber added a rushing touchdown, and Dave Strock kicked two field goals.

=== October 30 – at Kentucky ===
Virginia Tech fell 33–26 to Kentucky in Lexington. Don Strock threw for 265 yards and two touchdowns—one each to Mike Scales and Ken Edwards. Tommy Barber added a rushing touchdown, and Dave Strock kicked two field goals.

=== November 6 – at Virginia ===
Virginia Tech defeated Virginia 6–0 at Scott Stadium in Charlottesville. Dave Strock kicked two field goals, and the Gobblers’ defense held the Cavaliers scoreless, forcing three turnovers and recording four sacks.

=== November 13 – at No. 18 Houston ===
Virginia Tech lost 56–29 to No. 18 Houston at the Astrodome. Don Strock threw for 310 yards and three touchdowns—two to Mike Scales and one to Ken Edwards. Tommy Barber added a rushing touchdown, and Dave Strock kicked a 38-yard field goal.

=== November 20 – vs. Southern Miss ===
Virginia Tech fell 17–8 to Southern Miss at Lane Stadium. Don Strock threw a touchdown pass to Mike Scales, and the Gobblers added a safety on a blocked punt. The offense was held under 250 total yards.

=== November 27 – at VMI ===
Virginia Tech closed the season with a 34–0 win over VMI at Victory Stadium in Roanoke. Don Strock threw for 275 yards and three touchdowns—two to Mike Scales and one to Ken Edwards. Tommy Barber added a rushing touchdown, and Dave Strock kicked two field goals.

== Roster ==
The following players were members of the 1971 football team according to the roster published in the 1972 edition of The Bugle, the Virginia Tech yearbook.

1971 Virginia Tech roster
John Harwood "Jack" Abraham; Rich Amsden; Bruce Arians; James William "J.B." Barber Jr.; Tony Bertovich; Howy Beverly; Robin Blair; Robert Clinton Bond; Jack Booth; Tim Bosiack; Sammy Bria; Glenn Brown; Mike Burnop; Kurt Burwinkle; Tom Carpenito; Dennis Cogan; Nick Colobro; Jon Conlin; Doug Coyner; Curt Cretti; Mike Cunningham; Bobby Dabbs; Barry DeMarr; Buddy DeMarr; John Dobbins; Dennis Dodson; Hal Durham; Rusty Eddins; Bill Ellenbogen; Jerry Gaines; Bob German	Bruce Glatthorn; Tom Grys; Larry Hartman; Kent Henry; Steve Herl; Ronnie Holsinger; Peter Michael Horoszko; Bill House; Andy Hromyak; Rick Huebner; Jeff Hunsucker; Eddie Johns; Bob Karlsen; Lou Lagana; Jim Lawlor; Chip Lawson; Bruce Arthur Lemmert; Dick Maksanty; Steve Maguigan; Rich Matijevich; Randy McCann; John McDermott; Ray McGinley; Kevin Meehan; Tom Mikus; Steve Pasi; Vic Perez; Jim Polito; Jimmy Quinn; Barney Ratliff	Phil Reddick; Don Reel; Tom Reynolds; Tom Rother; Bruce Runyan; Vince Russo; Jerry Scharnus; John William Schneider; Rodney Schnurr; Chuck Schoenadel; Rod M. Sedwick; Chuck Shorter; Larry Smith; Dale Soncini; Bob Sporio; John Sprenkle; Don Sprouse; Terry Stewart; Wayne Stinnette; Peter Christian Striffler; Dave Strock; Don Strock; Ed Tennis; Mike Thomas; Joe Thompson; Kit Utz; Craig Valentine; Joe Winfree; Chris Woody; Steve Zeigler
