= 1971 Villanova Wildcats football team =

American college football season

1971 Villanova Wildcats football
- Conference: Independent
- Record: 6–4–1
- Head coach: Lou Ferry (2nd season)
- Captains: John Babinecz; John Heim
- Home stadium: Villanova Stadium

1971 NCAA University Division independents football records
	Conf.			Overall
Team	W	L	T	W		L		T
No. 5 Penn State		–		11	–	1	–	0
Boston College		–		9	–	2	–	0
No. 17 Houston		–		9	–	3	–	0
No. 13 Notre Dame		–		8	–	2	–	0
Utah State		–		8	–	3	–	0
Florida State		–		8	–	4	–	0
Cincinnati		–		7	–	4	–	0
West Virginia		–		7	–	4	–	0
Temple		–		6	–	2	–	1
Air Force		–		6	–	4	–	0
Army		–		6	–	4	–	0
Colgate		–		6	–	4	–	0
Villanova		–		6	–	4	–	1
South Carolina		–		6	–	5	–	0
Southern Miss		–		6	–	5	–	0
Georgia Tech		–		6	–	6	–	0
Northern Illinois		–		5	–	5	–	1
Syracuse		–		5	–	5	–	1
Dayton		–		5	–	6	–	0
Holy Cross		–		4	–	6	–	0
Miami (FL)		–		4	–	7	–	0
Rutgers		–		4	–	7	–	0
Virginia Tech		–		4	–	7	–	0
Navy		–		3	–	8	–	0
Pittsburgh		–		3	–	8	–	0
Tulane		–		3	–	8	–	0
Marshall		–		2	–	8	–	0
Xavier		–		1	–	9	–	0
Rankings from AP Poll

The 1971 Villanova Wildcats football team represented the Villanova University during the 1971 NCAA University Division football season. The head coach was Lou Ferry, coaching his second season with the Wildcats. The team played their home games at Villanova Stadium in Villanova, Pennsylvania.

== Schedule ==
Date	Time	Opponent	Site	Result	Attendance	Source
September 11	2:00 p.m.	at Maryland	Byrd Stadium; College Park, MD	W 28–13	22,600	
September 18	8:00 p.m.	at Toledo	Glass Bowl; Toledo, OH	L 7–10	20,012	
September 25	1:30 p.m.	VMI*	Villanova Stadium; Villanova, PA	W 13–3	13,324	
October 2	1:30 p.m.	at No. 4 Delaware*	Delaware Stadium; Newark, DE (rivalry)	L 15–23	20,284	
October 9	1:35 p.m.	at Boston College	Alumni Stadium; Chestnut Hill, MA	L 7–23	20,616	
October 15	8:30 p.m.	at Houston	Astrodome; Houston, TX	L 9–42	26,709	
October 23	8:00 p.m.	at No. 6 Tampa	Tampa Stadium; Tampa, FL	W 24–3	27,397	
October 30	8:00 p.m.	at Xavier	Corcoran Stadium; Cincinnati, OH	W 33–27	3,044	
November 6	1:30 p.m.	Boston University	Villanova Stadium; Villanova, PA	W 48–0	13,400	
November 13	1:30 p.m.	at Dayton	Baujan Field; Dayton, OH	W 14–7	9,237	
November 20	1:30 p.m.	at Temple	Temple Stadium; Philadelphia, PA (Mayor's Cup)	T 13–13	17,847	
*Non-conference game; Rankings from AP Poll released prior to the game; All times are in Eastern time

== Roster ==
1971 Villanova Wildcats football team roster
Players
Coaches
Offense

Pos.	#	Name	Class
QB	14	Tom Karczewski	So
WR	88	Mike Siani	Sr
TE	83	Bob Schaeffer	Jr
QB	11	Mike Sunday	So
QB	15	Daryl Woodring	Sr

Defense

Pos.	#	Name	Class
S	23	Tom Ammerman	So
LB	64	John Babinecz	Sr
DT	75	Joe Miller	So
DB	26	Dan O'Neil	Sr
LB	46	Kevin Reilly	Jr

Special teams

Pos.	#	Name	Class

Head coach

- Lou Ferry

Coordinators/assistant coaches

Legend

- (C) Team captain
- (S) Suspended
- (I) Ineligible
- Injured
- Redshirt
