= 1971 Notre Dame Fighting Irish football team =

American college football season

1971 Notre Dame Fighting Irish football
- Conference: Independent

Ranking
- Coaches: No. 15
- AP: No. 13
- Record: 8–2
- Head coach: Ara Parseghian (8th season)
- Captains: Tom Gatewood; Walt Patulski
- Home stadium: Notre Dame Stadium

1971 NCAA University Division independents football records
	Conf.			Overall
Team	W	L	T	W		L		T
No. 5 Penn State		–		11	–	1	–	0
Boston College		–		9	–	2	–	0
No. 17 Houston		–		9	–	3	–	0
No. 13 Notre Dame		–		8	–	2	–	0
Utah State		–		8	–	3	–	0
Florida State		–		8	–	4	–	0
Cincinnati		–		7	–	4	–	0
West Virginia		–		7	–	4	–	0
Temple		–		6	–	2	–	1
Air Force		–		6	–	4	–	0
Army		–		6	–	4	–	0
Colgate		–		6	–	4	–	0
Villanova		–		6	–	4	–	1
South Carolina		–		6	–	5	–	0
Southern Miss		–		6	–	5	–	0
Georgia Tech		–		6	–	6	–	0
Northern Illinois		–		5	–	5	–	1
Syracuse		–		5	–	5	–	1
Dayton		–		5	–	6	–	0
Holy Cross		–		4	–	6	–	0
Miami (FL)		–		4	–	7	–	0
Rutgers		–		4	–	7	–	0
Virginia Tech		–		4	–	7	–	0
Navy		–		3	–	8	–	0
Pittsburgh		–		3	–	8	–	0
Tulane		–		3	–	8	–	0
Marshall		–		2	–	8	–	0
Xavier		–		1	–	9	–	0
Rankings from AP Poll

The 1971 Notre Dame Fighting Irish football team was an American football team that represented the University of Notre Dame as an independent during the 1971 NCAA University Division football season. In their eighth year under head coach Ara Parseghian, the Irish compiled an 8–2 record, outscored opponents by a total of 225 to 86, and were ranked No. 13 in the final AP poll and No. 15 in the final UPI poll. Prior to their concluding game at LSU, Notre Dame announced that they would not play in a bowl game.

Defensive end Walt Patulski and defensive back Clarence Ellis were consensus first-team picks on the 1971 All-America college football team. End Tom Gatewood and defensive tackle Mike Kadish also received first-team All-America honors from at least one selector. The team's statistical leaders included quarterback Cliff Brown (669 passing yards), Bob Minnix (337 rushing yards), and Gatewood (417 receiving yards). Minnix and Ed Gulyas led the team in scoring with 30 points each.

The team played its home games at Notre Dame Stadium in Notre Dame, Indiana.

== Schedule ==
Date	Time	Opponent	Rank	Site	TV	Result	Attendance	Source
September 18	2:30 p.m.	Northwestern	No. 2	Notre Dame Stadium; Notre Dame, IN (rivalry)		W 50–7	59,075	
September 25	2:30 p.m.	at Purdue	No. 2	Ross–Ade Stadium; West Lafayette, IN (rivalry)		W 8–7	69,765	
October 2	1:50 p.m.	Michigan State	No. 4	Notre Dame Stadium; Notre Dame, IN (rivalry)	ABC regional	W 14–2	59,075	
October 9	8:15 p.m.	at Miami (FL)	No. 9	Miami Orange Bowl; Miami, FL (rivalry)		W 17–0	64,357	
October 16	2:30 p.m.	North Carolina	No. 7	Notre Dame Stadium; Notre Dame, IN (rivalry)		W 16–0	59,075	
October 23	2:30 p.m.	USC	No. 6	Notre Dame Stadium; Notre Dame, IN (rivalry)		L 14–28	59,075	
October 30	1:30 p.m.	Navy	No. 12	Notre Dame Stadium; Notre Dame, IN (rivalry)		W 21–0	59,075	
November 6	1:00 p.m.	at Pittsburgh	No. 8	Pitt Stadium; Pittsburgh, PA (rivalry)		W 56–7	55,528	
November 13	1:30 p.m.	Tulane	No. 8	Notre Dame Stadium; Notre Dame, IN		W 21–7	59,075	
November 20	8:05 p.m.	at No. 14 LSU	No. 7	Tiger Stadium; Baton Rouge, LA	ABC	L 8–28	66,936	
Rankings from AP Poll released prior to the game; All times are in Eastern time

== Game summaries ==
=== Northwestern ===
Northwestern at Notre Dame

Team	1	2	3	4	Total
Northwestern	7	0	0	0	7
• Notre Dame	7	23	6	14	50

- Date: September 18
- Location: Notre Dame Stadium, South Bend, IN
- Game start: 1:30 pm EST
- Game attendance: 59,075
- Game weather: Sunny, high 60s

=== Purdue ===
Notre Dame at Purdue

Team	1	2	3	4	Total
• Notre Dame	0	0	0	8	8
Purdue	0	7	0	0	7

- Date: September
- Location: Ross–Ade Stadium, West Lafayette, IN
- Game start: 1:30 pm EST
- Game attendance: 69,765
- Game weather: Rain/mud

Scoring summary
2		PUR	Armstrong 26 yard pass from Danielson (Renie kick)	PUR 7-0
4	2:58	ND	Swendsen recovered fumble in end zone (Steenberge to Creaney pass)	ND 8-7

"The Genuflect Play"

=== Michigan State ===
Michigan State at Notre Dame

Team	1	2	3	4	Total
Michigan St.	2	0	0	0	2
• Notre Dame	14	0	0	0	14

- Date: October 2
- Location: Notre Dame Stadium, South Bend, IN
- Game start: 12:50 pm EST
- Game attendance: 59,075
- Game weather: Hot, mid-80s
- Referee: Howard Wirtz (Big Ten)
- TV announcers (ABC): Chris Schenkel and Bud Wilkinson

Scoring summary
1	ND	Minnix 1-yard run (Thomas kick)	ND 7-0
1	ND	Minnix 5-yard run (Thomas kick)	ND 14-0
1	MSU	Safety (Etter recovered Parker fumble in end zone)	ND 14-2

=== Miami (Florida) ===
Notre Dame at Miami

Team	1	2	3	4	Total
• Notre Dame	0	3	7	7	17
Miami	0	0	0	0	0

- Date: October 9
- Location: Miami Orange Bowl
- Game start: 8:00 p.m. EDT
- Game attendance: 64,357
- Game weather: 84 degrees, 77% humidity
- Referee: Morris Harrison

Scoring summary
2	ND	Thomas 38-yard field goal	ND 3-0
3	ND	Huff 16-yard run (Thomas kick)	ND 10-0
4	ND	Dewan 6-yard run (Thomas kick)	ND 17-0

=== North Carolina ===
North Carolina at Notre Dame

Team	1	2	3	4	Total
N. Carolina	0	0	0	0	0
• Notre Dame	3	6	0	7	16

- Date: October 16
- Location: Notre Dame Stadium, South Bend, IN
- Game start: 1:30 pm EST
- Game attendance: 59,075
- Game weather: Fair, mid-70s
- Referee: Howard Wirtz

Scoring summary
1	ND	Thomas 28-yard field goal	ND 3-0
2	ND	Thomas 27-yard field goal	ND 6-0
2	ND	Thomas 24-yard field goal	ND 9-0
4	ND	Gatewood 4-yard pass from Brown (Thomas kick)	ND 16-0

=== USC ===
Southern Cal at Notre Dame

Team	1	2	3	4	Total
• USC	14	14	0	0	28
Notre Dame	7	0	7	0	14

- Date: October 23
- Location: Notre Dame Stadium, South Bend, IN
- Game start: 1:30 pm EDT
- Game attendance: 59,075
- Game weather: Damp, low 60s
- Referee: Jerry Markbreit

Scoring summary
1	S. Cal.	Garrison 31-yard pass from Jones (Rae Kick)	S. Cal 0-7
1	ND	Huff 1-yard run (Thomas kick)	Tied 7-7
1	S. Cal.	Garrison 24-yard pass from Rae (Rae kick)	S. Cal. 7-14
2	S. Cal.	Cunningham 1-yard run (Rae kick)	S. Cal. 7-21
2	S. Cal.	Dyer 54-yard interception return (Rae kick)	S. Cal. 7-28
4	ND	Cieszkowski 4-yard run (Thomas kick)	S. Cal. 14-28

=== Navy ===
Navy at Notre Dame

Team	1	2	3	4	Total
Navy	0	0	0	0	0
• Notre Dame	7	14	0	0	21

- Date: October 30
- Location: Notre Dame Stadium, South Bend, Indiana
- Game start: 1:30 pm EST
- Game attendance: 59,075

Scoring summary
1	ND	Gulyas 1 yard run (Thomas kick)	ND 7-0
2	ND	Minnix 1 yard run (Thomas kick)	ND 14-0
2	ND	Minnix 10 yard run (Thomas kick)	ND 21-0

=== Pittsburgh ===
Notre Dame at Pittsburgh

Team	1	2	3	4	Total
• Notre Dame	14	14	14	14	56
Pittsburgh	0	7	0	0	7

- Date: November 6
- Location: Pitt Stadium, Pittsburgh, PA
- Game start: 1:30 p.m. EST

=== Tulane ===
Tulane at Notre Dame

Team	1	2	3	4	Total
Tulane	0	7	0	0	7
• Notre Dame	0	0	14	7	21

- Date: November 13
- Location: Notre Dame Stadium, South Bend, IN
- Game start: 1:30 pm EST
- Game weather: Upper 40s
- Referee: Howard Wirtz

Scoring summary
2	Tulane	Barrios 14-yard pass from LaChausse (Gibson Kick)	Tulane 0-7
3	ND	Brown 1-yard run (Thomas kick)	Tied 7-7
3	ND	Creaney 19-yard pass from Brown (Thomas kick)	ND 14-7
4	ND	Brown 5-yard run (Thomas kick)	ND 21-7

=== LSU ===
Notre Dame at LSU

Team	1	2	3	4	Total
#7 Notre Dame	0	0	0	8	8
• #12 LSU	7	7	7	7	28

- Date: November 20
- Location: Tiger Stadium, Baton Rouge, Louisiana
- Game start: 7:05 p.m. CST
- Game attendance: 66,936
- Referee: James M. Artley (SEC)
- TV announcers (ABC): Chris Schenkel and Bud Wilkinson

Scoring summary
1	10:47	LSU	Hamilton 36 pass from Jones (Michaelson kick)	LSU 7-0
2	01:14	LSU	Hamilton 32 pass from Jones (Michaelson kick)	LSU 14-0
3	00:10	LSU	Jones 5 run (Michaelson kick)	LSU 21-0
4	02:54	ND	Gatewood 7 pass from Brown (Minnix pass from Brown)	LSU 21-8
4	00:20	LSU	Hamilton 13 pass from Lyons (Michaelson kick)	LSU 28-8

== Roster ==
1971 Notre Dame Fighting Irish football team roster
Players
Coaches
Offense

Pos.	#	Name	Class
G	62	Tom Bolger	So
QB	8	Cliff Brown	So
TE	88	Dave Casper	So
WR	44	Tom Gatewood	Sr
RB	22	Greg Hill	So
C	50	Dan Novakov	Sr
WR	80	Willie Townsend	Jr

Defense

Pos.	#	Name	Class
DB	17	Mike Crotty	Sr
DB	23	Clarence Ellis	Sr
DT	72	Mike Kadish	Sr
DT	75	Greg Marx	Jr
LB	81	Jim O'Malley	Jr
LB	45	Eric Patton	So
DE	85	Walt Patulski	Sr
DB		Tim Rudnick
DE	93	Fred Swendson	Sr
LB	61	Mike Webb	Jr

Special teams

Pos.	#	Name	Class
K	98	Bob Thomas	So

Head coach

- Ara Parseghian

Coordinators/assistant coaches

- Tom Pagna (OC)

Legend

- (C) Team captain
- (S) Suspended
- (I) Ineligible
- Injured
- Redshirt

== 1972 NFL draft ==
Player	Position	Round	Pick	NFL club
Walt Patulski	Defensive end	1	1	Buffalo Bills
Clarence Ellis	Defensive back	1	15	Atlanta Falcons
Mike Kadish	Defensive tackle	1	25	Miami Dolphins
Fred Swendson	Defensive end	3	53	Buffalo Bills
Eric Patton	Linebacker	4	86	Green Bay Packers
Tom Gatewood	Running back	5	107	New York Giants
Ralph Stepaniak	Defensive back	7	157	Buffalo Bills
Mike Zikas	Defensive tackle	7	177	New York Giants
