= 1971 Temple Owls football team =

American college football season

1971 Temple Owls football
- Conference: Independent
- Record: 6–2–1
- Head coach: Wayne Hardin (2nd season)
- Home stadium: Temple Stadium

1971 NCAA University Division independents football records
	Conf.			Overall
Team	W	L	T	W		L		T
No. 5 Penn State		–		11	–	1	–	0
Boston College		–		9	–	2	–	0
No. 17 Houston		–		9	–	3	–	0
No. 13 Notre Dame		–		8	–	2	–	0
Utah State		–		8	–	3	–	0
Florida State		–		8	–	4	–	0
Cincinnati		–		7	–	4	–	0
West Virginia		–		7	–	4	–	0
Temple		–		6	–	2	–	1
Air Force		–		6	–	4	–	0
Army		–		6	–	4	–	0
Colgate		–		6	–	4	–	0
Villanova		–		6	–	4	–	1
South Carolina		–		6	–	5	–	0
Southern Miss		–		6	–	5	–	0
Georgia Tech		–		6	–	6	–	0
Northern Illinois		–		5	–	5	–	1
Syracuse		–		5	–	5	–	1
Dayton		–		5	–	6	–	0
Holy Cross		–		4	–	6	–	0
Miami (FL)		–		4	–	7	–	0
Rutgers		–		4	–	7	–	0
Virginia Tech		–		4	–	7	–	0
Navy		–		3	–	8	–	0
Pittsburgh		–		3	–	8	–	0
Tulane		–		3	–	8	–	0
Marshall		–		2	–	8	–	0
Xavier		–		1	–	9	–	0
Rankings from AP Poll

The 1971 Temple Owls football team was an American football team that represented Temple University as an independent during the 1971 NCAA University Division football season. In its second season under head coach Wayne Hardin, the team compiled a 6–2–1 record and outscored opponents by a total of 248 to 136. The team played its home games at Temple Stadium in Philadelphia.

The team's statistical leaders included Doug Shobert with 1,513 passing yards, Paul Loughran with 468 rushing yards and 48 points scored, and Randy Grossman with 473 receiving yards, and Henry Hynoski with 60 points scored.

== Schedule ==
Date	Time	Opponent	Site	Result	Attendance	Source
September 18		Boston College	Temple Stadium; Philadelphia, PA	L 3–17	13,000	
October 2		Boston University	Temple Stadium; Philadelphia, PA	W 34–10	6,000	
October 9		at Connecticut	Memorial Stadium; Storrs, CT	W 38–0	10,071	
October 16	8:00 p.m.	Xavier	Temple Stadium; Philadelphia, PA	W 38–0		
October 23		at West Virginia	Mountaineer Field; Morgantown, WV	L 33–43	25,000	
October 30		at No. 1 Delaware	Delaware Stadium; Newark, DE	W 32–27	22,582	
November 6		at Rhode Island	Meade Stadium; Kingston, RI	W 40–13		
November 13		William & Mary	Temple Stadium; Philadelphia, PA	W 17–13	12,500	
November 20	1:30 p.m.	Villanova	Temple Stadium; Philadelphia, PA (Mayor's Cup)	T 13–13	17,847	
Rankings from AP Poll released prior to the game; All times are in Eastern time
