= 1971 Boston College Eagles football team =

American college football season

1971 Boston College Eagles football
- Conference: Independent
- Record: 9–2
- Head coach: Joe Yukica (4th season)
- Defensive coordinator: John Petercuskie (3rd season)
- Captains: Kevin Clemente; Ray Rippman
- Home stadium: Alumni Stadium

1971 NCAA University Division independents football records
	Conf.			Overall
Team	W	L	T	W		L		T
No. 5 Penn State		–		11	–	1	–	0
Boston College		–		9	–	2	–	0
No. 17 Houston		–		9	–	3	–	0
No. 13 Notre Dame		–		8	–	2	–	0
Utah State		–		8	–	3	–	0
Florida State		–		8	–	4	–	0
Cincinnati		–		7	–	4	–	0
West Virginia		–		7	–	4	–	0
Temple		–		6	–	2	–	1
Air Force		–		6	–	4	–	0
Army		–		6	–	4	–	0
Colgate		–		6	–	4	–	0
Villanova		–		6	–	4	–	1
South Carolina		–		6	–	5	–	0
Southern Miss		–		6	–	5	–	0
Georgia Tech		–		6	–	6	–	0
Northern Illinois		–		5	–	5	–	1
Syracuse		–		5	–	5	–	1
Dayton		–		5	–	6	–	0
Holy Cross		–		4	–	6	–	0
Miami (FL)		–		4	–	7	–	0
Rutgers		–		4	–	7	–	0
Virginia Tech		–		4	–	7	–	0
Navy		–		3	–	8	–	0
Pittsburgh		–		3	–	8	–	0
Tulane		–		3	–	8	–	0
Marshall		–		2	–	8	–	0
Xavier		–		1	–	9	–	0
Rankings from AP Poll

The 1971Boston College Eagles football team represented Boston College as an independent during the 1971 NCAA University Division football season. Led by fourth-year head coach Joe Yukica, the Eagles compiled a record of 9–2, but were not invited to a bowl game. They were passed up for a spot in the Peach Bowl in favor of four-loss Georgia Tech, partly due to the Eagles' reputation of having a slow, defense-heavy style of play. Boston College played home games at Alumni Stadium in Chestnut Hill, Massachusetts.

== Schedule ==
Date	Time	Opponent	Site	Result	Attendance	Source
September 11		at West Virginia	Mountaineer Field; Morgantown, WV	L 14–45	31,500	
September 18		at Temple	Temple Stadium; Philadelphia, PA	W 17–3	13,000	
September 25	1:35 p.m.	Navy	Alumni Stadium; Chestnut Hill, MA	W 49–6	22,700	
October 2		at Richmond	City Stadium; Richmond, VA	W 24–0	6,500	
October 9	1:35 p.m.	Villanova	Alumni Stadium; Chestnut Hill, MA	W 23–7	20,616	
October 16		at Texas Tech	Jones Stadium; Lubbock, TX	L 6–14	32,480	
October 23		Pittsburgh	Alumni Stadium; Chestnut Hill, MA	W 40–22	26,854	
November 6		at Syracuse	Archbold Stadium; Syracuse, NY	W 10–3	21,978	
November 13	1:31 p.m.	Northern Illinois	Alumni Stadium; Chestnut Hill, MA	W 20–10	16,238	
November 20		UMass	Alumni Stadium; Chestnut Hill, MA (rivalry)	W 35–0	25,311	
November 27		vs. Holy Cross	Schaefer Stadium; Foxborough, MA (rivalry)	W 21–7	22,205	
All times are in Eastern time

=== Game notes ===
The game against rival Holy Cross was moved at the last minute to the newly constructed Schaefer Stadium (home of the New England Patriots until 2001) due to a heavy snowstorm making conditions unplayable at Fitton Field in Worcester.

== Roster ==
1971 Boston College Eagles football team roster
Players			Coaches
Offense: Pos. / # / Name / Class; RB / 27 / Bill Thomas / Sr	Defense: Pos. / # / Name / Class; DT / 73 / Jeff Yeates	Special teams: Pos. / # / Name / Class	Head coach: Joe Yukica; Coordinators/assistant coaches Legend: (C) Team captain; (S) Suspended; (I) Ineligible; Injured; Redshirt
