= 1971 Northern Illinois Huskies football team =

American college football season

1971 Northern Illinois Huskies football
- Conference: Independent
- Record: 5–5–1
- Head coach: Jerry Ippoliti (1st season)
- MVPs: Mark Kellar; Larry Clark
- Captains: Jim Montgomery; Leo Hudetz; Steve Goehl; Terry Drugan
- Home stadium: Huskie Stadium

1971 NCAA University Division independents football records
	Conf.			Overall
Team	W	L	T	W		L		T
No. 5 Penn State		–		11	–	1	–	0
Boston College		–		9	–	2	–	0
No. 17 Houston		–		9	–	3	–	0
No. 13 Notre Dame		–		8	–	2	–	0
Utah State		–		8	–	3	–	0
Florida State		–		8	–	4	–	0
Cincinnati		–		7	–	4	–	0
West Virginia		–		7	–	4	–	0
Temple		–		6	–	2	–	1
Air Force		–		6	–	4	–	0
Army		–		6	–	4	–	0
Colgate		–		6	–	4	–	0
Villanova		–		6	–	4	–	1
South Carolina		–		6	–	5	–	0
Southern Miss		–		6	–	5	–	0
Georgia Tech		–		6	–	6	–	0
Northern Illinois		–		5	–	5	–	1
Syracuse		–		5	–	5	–	1
Dayton		–		5	–	6	–	0
Holy Cross		–		4	–	6	–	0
Miami (FL)		–		4	–	7	–	0
Rutgers		–		4	–	7	–	0
Virginia Tech		–		4	–	7	–	0
Navy		–		3	–	8	–	0
Pittsburgh		–		3	–	8	–	0
Tulane		–		3	–	8	–	0
Marshall		–		2	–	8	–	0
Xavier		–		1	–	9	–	0
Rankings from AP Poll

The 1971 Northern Illinois Huskies football team represented Northern Illinois University as an independent during the 1971 NCAA University Division football season. Led by first-year head coach Jerry Ippoliti, the Huskies compiled a record of 5–5–1. Northern Illinois played home games at Huskie Stadium in DeKalb, Illinois.

== Schedule ==
Date	Time	Opponent	Site	Result	Attendance	Source
September 11	1:30 p.m.	at Wisconsin	Camp Randall Stadium; Madison, WI	L 0–31	45,437	
September 18	7:30 p.m.	Long Beach State	Huskie Stadium; DeKalb, IL	W 48–38	11,687	
September 25	12:30 p.m.	at Western Michigan	Waldo Stadium; Kalamazoo, MI	L 17–27	18,900	
October 2	9:30 p.m.	at San Diego State	San Diego Stadium; San Diego, CA	L 10–30	26,043	
October 9	7:30 p.m.	Marshall	Huskie Stadium; DeKalb, IL	W 33–18	11,800	
October 16	8:00 p.m.	at West Texas State	Kimbrough Memorial Stadium; Canyon, TX	W 22–19	11,500	
October 23	1:30 p.m.	Ball State	Huskie Stadium; DeKalb, IL (rivalry)	T 10–10	16,898	
October 30	12:30 p.m.	at Kent State	Memorial Stadium; Kent, OH	W 26–7	10,545	
November 6	1:30 p.m.	No. 14 Toledo	Huskie Stadium; DeKalb, IL	L 8–23	10,339	
November 13	12:31 p.m.	at Boston College	Alumni Stadium; Chestnut Hill, MA	L 10–20	16,238	
November 20	1:30 p.m.	Xavier	Huskie Stadium; DeKalb, IL	W 14–9	11,658	
Rankings from AP Poll released prior to the game; All times are in Central time
