= 1971 Tulane Green Wave football team =

American college football season

1971 Tulane Green Wave football
- Conference: Independent
- Record: 3–8
- Head coach: Bennie Ellender (1st season)
- Home stadium: Tulane Stadium

1971 NCAA University Division independents football records
	Conf.			Overall
Team	W	L	T	W		L		T
No. 5 Penn State		–		11	–	1	–	0
Boston College		–		9	–	2	–	0
No. 17 Houston		–		9	–	3	–	0
No. 13 Notre Dame		–		8	–	2	–	0
Utah State		–		8	–	3	–	0
Florida State		–		8	–	4	–	0
Cincinnati		–		7	–	4	–	0
West Virginia		–		7	–	4	–	0
Temple		–		6	–	2	–	1
Air Force		–		6	–	4	–	0
Army		–		6	–	4	–	0
Colgate		–		6	–	4	–	0
Villanova		–		6	–	4	–	1
South Carolina		–		6	–	5	–	0
Southern Miss		–		6	–	5	–	0
Georgia Tech		–		6	–	6	–	0
Northern Illinois		–		5	–	5	–	1
Syracuse		–		5	–	5	–	1
Dayton		–		5	–	6	–	0
Holy Cross		–		4	–	6	–	0
Miami (FL)		–		4	–	7	–	0
Rutgers		–		4	–	7	–	0
Virginia Tech		–		4	–	7	–	0
Navy		–		3	–	8	–	0
Pittsburgh		–		3	–	8	–	0
Tulane		–		3	–	8	–	0
Marshall		–		2	–	8	–	0
Xavier		–		1	–	9	–	0
Rankings from AP Poll

The 1971 Tulane Green Wave football team was an American football team that represented Tulane University as an independent during the 1971 NCAA University Division football season. In its first year under head coach Bennie Ellender, Tulane compiled a 3–8 record and was outscored by a total of 215 to 152.

The team gained an average of 119.4 rushing yards and 129.7 passing yards per game. On defense, it gave up an average of 220.2 rushing yards and 128.8 passing yards per game. Tulane's individual statistical leaders included quarterback Mike Walker with 995 passing yards, Ricky Herbert with 819 rushing yards, and Maxie LeBlanc with 423 receiving yards.

The team played its home games at Tulane Stadium in New Orleans.

== Schedule ==
Date	Time	Opponent	Site	Result	Attendance	Source
September 11		Texas Tech	Tulane Stadium; New Orleans, LA	W 15–9	21,738	
September 18		at No. 11 Georgia	Sanford Stadium; Athens, GA	L 7–17	51,542	
September 25		at Rice	Rice Stadium; Houston, TX	L 11–14	25,000	
October 2		William & Mary	Tulane Stadium; New Orleans, LA	L 3–14	17,392	
October 9		at No. 18 North Carolina	Kenan Memorial Stadium; Chapel Hill, NC	W 37–29	39,500	
October 16		Pittsburgh	Tulane Stadium; New Orleans, LA	W 33–8	17,650	
October 23		Georgia Tech	Tulane Stadium; New Orleans, LA	L 16–24	50,248	
October 30		Vanderbilt	Tulane Stadium; New Orleans, LA	L 9–13	17,941	
November 6	2:03 p.m.	Ohio	Tulane Stadium; New Orleans, LA	L 7–30	9,922	
November 13		at No. 8 Notre Dame	Notre Dame Stadium; Notre Dame, IN	L 7–21	59,075	
November 27		at No. 10 LSU	Tiger Stadium; Baton Rouge, LA (Battle for the Rag)	L 7–36	59,897	
Rankings from AP Poll released prior to the game; All times are in Central time

== Roster ==
1971 Tulane Green Wave football team roster
Players
Coaches
Offense

Pos.	#	Name	Class
WR	29	Steve Barrios	Sr
WR	22	Mike Foley	So
OT	72	Rob Foley	Jr
WR	21	Scott Heape	Sr
OT	78	Jeff Hollingsworth	Jr
QB	17	Rusty Lachaussee	Sr
C	50	Jim Thompson	Sr
G	60	Steve Thomas	Sr
QB	16	Mike Walker	Jr

Defense

Pos.	#	Name	Class
LB	51	Jim Atkins	Sr
DB	23	Joe Bullard	Sr
LB	45	Ken Doughty	Jr
DB	26	Coleman Dupre	So
S	13	Paul Ellis	Sr
LB	39	Bruce Grimes	Jr
DT	57	Joel Hale	Sr
DB	33	David Hebert	Sr
DE	80	Randy Lee	Jr
DE	84	Ed Smith	Sr
DT	79	Bob Waldron	Sr
DE	87	Joe Young	Sr

Special teams

Pos.	#	Name	Class

Head coach

- Bennie Ellender

Coordinators/assistant coaches

Legend

- (C) Team captain
- (S) Suspended
- (I) Ineligible
- Injured
- Redshirt
