= 1971 Air Force Falcons football team =

American college football season

1971 Air Force Falcons football
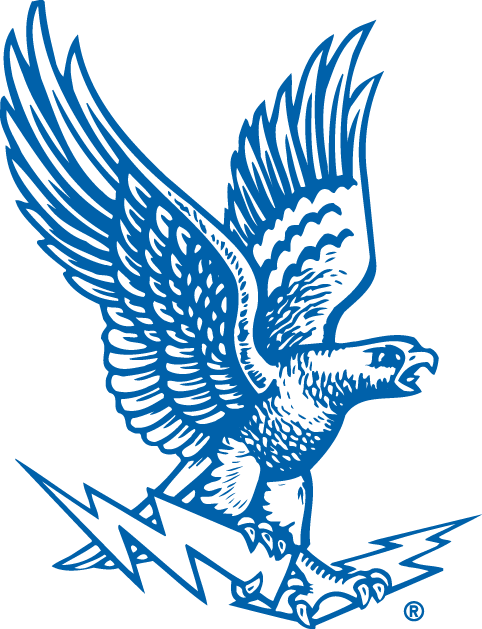
- Conference: Independent
- Record: 6–4
- Head coach: Ben Martin (14th season)
- Captains: Brian Bream; John Greenlaw
- Home stadium: Falcon Stadium

1971 NCAA University Division independents football records
	Conf.			Overall
Team	W	L	T	W		L		T
No. 5 Penn State		–		11	–	1	–	0
Boston College		–		9	–	2	–	0
No. 17 Houston		–		9	–	3	–	0
No. 13 Notre Dame		–		8	–	2	–	0
Utah State		–		8	–	3	–	0
Florida State		–		8	–	4	–	0
Cincinnati		–		7	–	4	–	0
West Virginia		–		7	–	4	–	0
Temple		–		6	–	2	–	1
Air Force		–		6	–	4	–	0
Army		–		6	–	4	–	0
Colgate		–		6	–	4	–	0
Villanova		–		6	–	4	–	1
South Carolina		–		6	–	5	–	0
Southern Miss		–		6	–	5	–	0
Georgia Tech		–		6	–	6	–	0
Northern Illinois		–		5	–	5	–	1
Syracuse		–		5	–	5	–	1
Dayton		–		5	–	6	–	0
Holy Cross		–		4	–	6	–	0
Miami (FL)		–		4	–	7	–	0
Rutgers		–		4	–	7	–	0
Virginia Tech		–		4	–	7	–	0
Navy		–		3	–	8	–	0
Pittsburgh		–		3	–	8	–	0
Tulane		–		3	–	8	–	0
Marshall		–		2	–	8	–	0
Xavier		–		1	–	9	–	0
Rankings from AP Poll

The 1971 Air Force Falcons football team represented the United States Air Force Academy as an independent during the 1971 NCAA University Division football season. Led by 14th-year head coach Ben Martin, the Falcons compiled a record of 6–4 and tied in scoring with their opponents, 187–187. Air Force played their home games at Falcon Stadium in Colorado Springs, Colorado.

The previous season ended in the Sugar Bowl in New Orleans on New Year's Day. The 1971 Falcons began at 5–1 and were No. 18 in the AP Poll in late October, but lost three of their final four games, fell out of the polls, and did not play in the postseason.

This was the last season that Navy was not on the Falcons' schedule. The Commander-in-Chief's Trophy was introduced in 1972 and matched the three military academies annually. Previously, Air Force played Navy in even years and Army in odd years.

== Schedule ==
Date	Time	Opponent	Rank	Site	Result	Attendance	Source
September 18	1:20 p.m.	Missouri		Falcon Stadium; Colorado Springs, CO	W 7–6	26,584	
September 25	1:32 p.m.	Wyoming		Falcon Stadium; Colorado Springs, CO	W 23–19	37,917	
October 2	11:30 a.m.	at No. 9 Penn State		Beaver Stadium; University Park, PA	L 14–16	50,459	
October 9		SMU		Falcon Stadium; Colorado Springs, CO	W 30–0	45,050	
October 16		Army		Falcon Stadium; Colorado Springs, CO (rivalry)	W 20–7	44,802	
October 23	1:30 p.m.	at Colorado State	No. 20	Hughes Stadium; Fort Collins, CO (rivalry)	W 17–12	23,194	
October 30	7:30 p.m.	at No. 13 Arizona State	No. 18	Sun Devil Stadium; Tempe, AZ	L 28–44	50,380	
November 6	1:00 p.m.	Oregon		Falcon Stadium; Colorado Springs, CO	L 14–23	26,435	
November 13	12:35 p.m.	at Tulsa		Skelly Stadium; Tulsa, OK	W 17–7	21,000	
November 20	1:30 p.m.	at No. 10 Colorado		Folsom Field; Boulder, CO	L 17–53	46,362	
Rankings from AP Poll released prior to the game

== Roster ==
1971 Air Force Falcons football team roster
Players
Coaches
Offense

Pos.	#	Name	Class
RB		Brian Bream	Sr
C		Orderia Mitchell	Jr

Defense

Pos.	#	Name	Class
DL		Eugene Ogilvie	Jr

Special teams

Pos.	#	Name	Class

Head coach

- Ben Martin

Coordinators/assistant coaches

Legend

- (C) Team captain
- (S) Suspended
- (I) Ineligible
- Injured
- Redshirt
