= 1971 Utah State Aggies football team =

American college football season

1971 Utah State Aggies football
- Conference: Independent
- Record: 8–3
- Head coach: Chuck Mills (5th season)
- Home stadium: Romney Stadium

1971 NCAA University Division independents football records
	Conf.			Overall
Team	W	L	T	W		L		T
No. 5 Penn State		–		11	–	1	–	0
Boston College		–		9	–	2	–	0
No. 17 Houston		–		9	–	3	–	0
No. 13 Notre Dame		–		8	–	2	–	0
Utah State		–		8	–	3	–	0
Florida State		–		8	–	4	–	0
Cincinnati		–		7	–	4	–	0
West Virginia		–		7	–	4	–	0
Temple		–		6	–	2	–	1
Air Force		–		6	–	4	–	0
Army		–		6	–	4	–	0
Colgate		–		6	–	4	–	0
Villanova		–		6	–	4	–	1
South Carolina		–		6	–	5	–	0
Southern Miss		–		6	–	5	–	0
Georgia Tech		–		6	–	6	–	0
Northern Illinois		–		5	–	5	–	1
Syracuse		–		5	–	5	–	1
Dayton		–		5	–	6	–	0
Holy Cross		–		4	–	6	–	0
Miami (FL)		–		4	–	7	–	0
Rutgers		–		4	–	7	–	0
Virginia Tech		–		4	–	7	–	0
Navy		–		3	–	8	–	0
Pittsburgh		–		3	–	8	–	0
Tulane		–		3	–	8	–	0
Marshall		–		2	–	8	–	0
Xavier		–		1	–	9	–	0
Rankings from AP Poll

The 1971 Utah State Aggies football team was an American football team that represented Utah State University as an independent during the 1971 NCAA University Division football season. In their fifth season under head coach Chuck Mills, the Aggies compiled an 8–3 record and outscored all opponents 243 to 183.

The team's statistical leaders included Tony Adams with 2,035 passing yards, Ed Giles with 510 rushing yards, Bob Wicks with 862 receiving yards, Jerry Hughes with 60 points scored (six touchdowns), Alan McMurray "Madpup" (soph all american) lead team with 104 tackles, (record 19.5 sacks) and Tom Murphy with 81 total tackles.

In December, the team traveled to Japan for two games against Japanese university students. The Aggies were the first American college football team to play a game in Japan since the sport was introduced there in the 1910s. The American players reportedly had a height advantage of twelve inches (30 cm) and a weight advantage of fifty pounds (23 kg) per player.

== Schedule ==
Date	Time	Opponent	Site	Result	Attendance	Source
September 11		at Kansas State	KSU Stadium; Manhattan, KS	W 10–7	30,000	
September 18		New Mexico State	Romney Stadium; Logan, UT	W 34–0	10,378	
September 25		UNLV	Romney Stadium; Logan, UT	W 27–7	10,640	
October 2		at No. 1 Nebraska	Memorial Stadium; Lincoln, NE	L 6–42	67,421	
October 9		BYU	Romney Stadium; Logan, UT (rivalry)	W 29–7	17,015	
October 16	1:30 p.m.	Memphis State	Romney Stadium; Logan, UT	W 7–6	5,041	
October 23		at San Diego State	San Diego Stadium; San Diego, CA	L 20–36	25,047	
October 30		at Colorado State	Hughes Stadium; Fort Collins, CO	W 18–17	14,294	
November 6		Wyoming	Romney Stadium; Logan, UT (rivalry)	L 29–31	9,130	
November 13		at Utah	Ute Stadium; Salt Lake City, UT (rivalry)	W 21–17	16,292	
November 20		at Idaho	Idaho Stadium; Moscow, ID	W 42–13	15,100	
December 19		vs. Japanese University East All-Star	National Stadium; Tokyo, Japan (Silk Bowl)	W 50–6	30,000	
December 26		vs. All-Japan University West	Osaka, Japan	W 46–6	10,000	
Rankings from AP Poll released prior to the game; All times are in Mountain time
