= 1971 Dayton Flyers football team =

American college football season

1971 Dayton Flyers football
- Conference: Independent
- Record: 5–6
- Head coach: John McVay (7th season)
- Home stadium: Baujan Field

1971 NCAA University Division independents football records
	Conf.			Overall
Team	W	L	T	W		L		T
No. 5 Penn State		–		11	–	1	–	0
Boston College		–		9	–	2	–	0
No. 17 Houston		–		9	–	3	–	0
No. 13 Notre Dame		–		8	–	2	–	0
Utah State		–		8	–	3	–	0
Florida State		–		8	–	4	–	0
Cincinnati		–		7	–	4	–	0
West Virginia		–		7	–	4	–	0
Temple		–		6	–	2	–	1
Air Force		–		6	–	4	–	0
Army		–		6	–	4	–	0
Colgate		–		6	–	4	–	0
Villanova		–		6	–	4	–	1
South Carolina		–		6	–	5	–	0
Southern Miss		–		6	–	5	–	0
Georgia Tech		–		6	–	6	–	0
Northern Illinois		–		5	–	5	–	1
Syracuse		–		5	–	5	–	1
Dayton		–		5	–	6	–	0
Holy Cross		–		4	–	6	–	0
Miami (FL)		–		4	–	7	–	0
Rutgers		–		4	–	7	–	0
Virginia Tech		–		4	–	7	–	0
Navy		–		3	–	8	–	0
Pittsburgh		–		3	–	8	–	0
Tulane		–		3	–	8	–	0
Marshall		–		2	–	8	–	0
Xavier		–		1	–	9	–	0
Rankings from AP Poll

The 1971 Dayton Flyers football team represented the University of Dayton as an independent during the 1971 NCAA University Division football season. In their seventh season under head coach John McVay, the Flyers compiled a 5–6 record.

== Schedule ==
Date	Time	Opponent	Site	Result	Attendance	Source
September 11		Cincinnati	Baujan Field; Dayton, OH	W 16–3	14,012	
September 18		Southern Illinois	Baujan Field; Dayton, OH	L 14–31	11,342	
September 25	7:30 p.m.	Miami (OH)	Baujan Field; Dayton, OH	L 0–14	7,929	
October 2	8:00 p.m.	at Louisville	Fairgrounds Stadium; Louisville, KY	L 13–41	17,511	
October 9		at Tampa	Tampa Stadium; Tampa, Fl	L 14–47	18,031	
October 16	1:30 p.m.	at Marshall	Fairfield Stadium; Huntington, WV	W 13–0	10,750	
October 23	8:00 p.m.	at No. 14 Toledo	Glass Bowl; Toledo, OH	L 7–35	17,201	
October 30		Youngstown State	Baujan Field; Dayton, OH	W 35–24	7,420	
November 6	2:05 p.m.	at Xavier	Xavier Stadium; Cincinnati, OH	W 20–10	2,116	
November 13	1:30 p.m.	Villanova	Baujan Field; Dayton, OH	L 7–14	9,237	
November 20	1:30 p.m.	Bowling Green	Baujan Field; Dayton, OH	W 26–16	7,257	
Rankings from AP Poll released prior to the game; All times are in Eastern time
