= 1971 Cincinnati Bearcats football team =

American college football season

1971 Cincinnati Bearcats football
- Conference: Independent
- Record: 7–4
- Head coach: Ray Callahan (3rd season)
- Captains: Albert Johnson; Ken Weingart; Craig Heneveld; Ron Bryant
- Home stadium: Nippert Stadium

1971 NCAA University Division independents football records
	Conf.			Overall
Team	W	L	T	W		L		T
No. 5 Penn State		–		11	–	1	–	0
Boston College		–		9	–	2	–	0
No. 17 Houston		–		9	–	3	–	0
No. 13 Notre Dame		–		8	–	2	–	0
Utah State		–		8	–	3	–	0
Florida State		–		8	–	4	–	0
Cincinnati		–		7	–	4	–	0
West Virginia		–		7	–	4	–	0
Temple		–		6	–	2	–	1
Air Force		–		6	–	4	–	0
Army		–		6	–	4	–	0
Colgate		–		6	–	4	–	0
Villanova		–		6	–	4	–	1
South Carolina		–		6	–	5	–	0
Southern Miss		–		6	–	5	–	0
Georgia Tech		–		6	–	6	–	0
Northern Illinois		–		5	–	5	–	1
Syracuse		–		5	–	5	–	1
Dayton		–		5	–	6	–	0
Holy Cross		–		4	–	6	–	0
Miami (FL)		–		4	–	7	–	0
Rutgers		–		4	–	7	–	0
Virginia Tech		–		4	–	7	–	0
Navy		–		3	–	8	–	0
Pittsburgh		–		3	–	8	–	0
Tulane		–		3	–	8	–	0
Marshall		–		2	–	8	–	0
Xavier		–		1	–	9	–	0
Rankings from AP Poll

The 1971 Cincinnati Bearcats football team represented University of Cincinnati as an independent during the 1971 NCAA University Division football season. Led by third-year head coach Ray Callahan, the Bearcats compiled a record of 7–4. The team played home games at Nippert Stadium in Cincinnati.

== Schedule ==
Date	Time	Opponent	Site	Result	Attendance	Source
September 11		at Dayton	Baujan Field; Dayton, OH	L 3–16	14,012	
September 18	8:00 p.m.	Kent State	Nippert Stadium; Cincinnati, OH	W 42–20	7,329	
September 25	8:00 p.m.	Houston	Nippert Stadium; Cincinnati, OH	L 3–12	12,542	
October 2		at Texas A&M	Kyle Field; College Station, TX	W 17–0	26,267	
October 9	8:00 p.m.	Xavier	Nippert Stadium; Cincinnati, OH (rivalry)	W 30–7	13,082	
October 16	1:30 p.m.	Wichita State	Nippert Stadium; Cincinnati, OH	W 20–7	11,406	
October 30	2:00 p.m.	Memphis State	Nippert Stadium; Cincinnati, OH (rivalry)	L 21–45	17,020	
November 6	1:30 p.m.	North Texas State	Nippert Stadium; Cincinnati, OH	W 40–7	2,500	
November 13	1:30 p.m.	at Ohio	Peden Stadium; Athens, OH	W 23–15	18,172	
November 20		at Miami (OH)	Miami Field; Oxford, OH (Victory Bell)	L 7–43	9,123	
November 27	2:00 p.m.	at Louisville	Fairgrounds Stadium; Louisville, KY (The Keg of Nails)	W 19–16	10,132	
All times are in Eastern time

== Game Films ==
- 1971 Cincinnati - Ohio U Football Game Film
