= 1971 Pittsburgh Panthers football team =

American college football season

1971 Pittsburgh Panthers football
- Conference: Independent
- Record: 3–8
- Head coach: Carl DePasqua (3rd season)
- Offensive coordinator: Lou Cecconi (3rd season)
- Offensive scheme: Pro-style, triple option
- Defensive coordinator: Foge Fazio (1st season)
- Base defense: 5–2
- Home stadium: Pitt Stadium

1971 NCAA University Division independents football records
	Conf.			Overall
Team	W	L	T	W		L		T
No. 5 Penn State		–		11	–	1	–	0
Boston College		–		9	–	2	–	0
No. 17 Houston		–		9	–	3	–	0
No. 13 Notre Dame		–		8	–	2	–	0
Utah State		–		8	–	3	–	0
Florida State		–		8	–	4	–	0
Cincinnati		–		7	–	4	–	0
West Virginia		–		7	–	4	–	0
Temple		–		6	–	2	–	1
Air Force		–		6	–	4	–	0
Army		–		6	–	4	–	0
Colgate		–		6	–	4	–	0
Villanova		–		6	–	4	–	1
South Carolina		–		6	–	5	–	0
Southern Miss		–		6	–	5	–	0
Georgia Tech		–		6	–	6	–	0
Northern Illinois		–		5	–	5	–	1
Syracuse		–		5	–	5	–	1
Dayton		–		5	–	6	–	0
Holy Cross		–		4	–	6	–	0
Miami (FL)		–		4	–	7	–	0
Rutgers		–		4	–	7	–	0
Virginia Tech		–		4	–	7	–	0
Navy		–		3	–	8	–	0
Pittsburgh		–		3	–	8	–	0
Tulane		–		3	–	8	–	0
Marshall		–		2	–	8	–	0
Xavier		–		1	–	9	–	0
Rankings from AP Poll

The 1971 Pittsburgh Panthers football team represented the University of Pittsburgh as an independent during the 1971 NCAA University Division football season. Led by third-year head coach Carl DePasqua, the Panthers compiled a record of 3–8. The team played home games at Pitt Stadium in Pittsburgh.

== Schedule ==
Date	Time	Opponent	Site	Result	Attendance	Source
September 11	10:30 p.m.	at No. 15 UCLA	Los Angeles Memorial Coliseum; Los Angeles, CA	W 29–25	36,205	
September 25	1:30 p.m.	No. 11 Oklahoma	Pitt Stadium; Pittsburgh, PA	L 29–55	35,030	
October 2	1:30 p.m.	at West Virginia	Mountaineer Field; Morgantown, WV (Backyard Brawl)	L 9–20	38,500	
October 9	1:31 p.m.	Navy	Pitt Stadium; Pittsburgh, PA	W 36–35	24,825	
October 16	8:30 p.m.	at Tulane	Tulane Stadium; New Orleans, LA	L 8–33	17,650	
October 23	1:30 p.m.	at Boston College	Alumni Stadium; Chestnut Hill, MA	L 22–40	26,854	
October 30	1:30 p.m.	Syracuse^{†}	Pitt Stadium; Pittsburgh, PA (rivalry)	W 31–21	24,497	
November 6	1:30 p.m.	No. 8 Notre Dame	Pitt Stadium; Pittsburgh, PA (rivalry)	L 7–56	55,528	
November 13	1:29 p.m.	at Army	Michie Stadium; West Point, NY	L 14–17	38,559	
November 20	1:30 p.m.	No. 6 Penn State	Pitt Stadium; Pittsburgh, PA (rivalry)	L 18–55	39,539	
November 27	7:30 p.m.	at Florida State	Doak Campbell Stadium; Tallahassee, FL	L 13–31	19,292	
^{†}Homecoming; Rankings from AP Poll released prior to the game; All times are in Eastern time

== Roster ==
1971 Pittsburgh Panthers football team roster
Players
Coaches
Offense

Pos.	#	Name	Class
QB	9	John Hogan	Jr
C	52	Bob Kuziel	Sr
OT	76	Dave Wannstedt	So

Defense

Pos.	#	Name	Class
LB	44	Joe Carroll	Sr
LB	50	Ralph Cindrich	Sr
DT	75	Glenn Hyde	So

Special teams

Pos.	#	Name	Class

Head coach

- Carl DePasqua

Coordinators/assistant coaches

Legend

- (C) Team captain
- (S) Suspended
- (I) Ineligible
- Injured
- Redshirt

== Coaching staff ==
1971 Pittsburgh Panthers football staff
Coaching staff: Carl DePasqua – Head coach; Lou Cecconi – Offensive coordinator

== Team players drafted into the NFL ==
Player	Position	Round	Pick	NFL club
Bob Kuziel	Center	3	60	New Orleans
Ralph Cindrich	Linebacker	5	119	Atlanta Falcons
Joe Carroll	Linebacker	11	277	Oakland Raiders
Joel Klimek	Tightend	15	375	New England Patriots
Henry Alford	Defensive end	16	394	St. Louis Cardinals
