= Bob Rickenbach =

American gridiron football player (born 1950)

Profile
- Positions: Offensive guard, Center

Personal information
- Born: December 31, 1950 (age 75); Philadelphia, Pennsylvania, U.S.
- Listed height: 6 ft 4 in (1.93 m)
- Listed weight: 255 lb (116 kg)

Career information
- College: Penn State

Career history
- 1973: Ottawa Rough Riders
- 1974–1975: Philadelphia Bell
- 1975: Southern California Sun

Awards and highlights
- Grey Cup champion (1973)

Bob Rickenbach (born December 31, 1950) is a retired gridiron football player who played for the Ottawa Rough Riders, Philadelphia Bell and Southern California Sun. He played college football at Penn State University.
