= Hal Roberts =

American football player (born 1952)

No. 14
- Position: Punter

Personal information
- Born: August 25, 1952 (age 74); Dallas, Texas, U.S.
- Listed height: 6 ft 1 in (1.85 m)
- Listed weight: 180 lb (82 kg)

Career information
- High school: W. T. White (Dallas)
- College: Houston
- NFL draft: 1974: undrafted

Career history
- Houston Texans (1974)*; St. Louis Cardinals (1974)
- * Offseason or practice squad member only
- Stats at Pro Football Reference

Hal Lynn Roberts (born August 25, 1952) is an American former professional football punter who played for the St. Louis Cardinals of the National Football League (NFL). He played college football for the Houston Cougars.

== Early life ==
Hal Lynn Roberts was born on August 25, 1952, in Dallas, Texas. He attended W. T. White High School in Dallas.

== College career ==
Roberts enrolled at the University of Houston to play college football for the Cougars. He was on the freshman team in 1970 and a three-year varsity letterman from 1971 to 1973. He was the first kicking specialist ever recruited by the Cougars. Roberts had a strong freshman year but a disappointing varsity career. By his senior season, he was also practicing at wide receiver but never played in a game at the position. Roberts said he had about a 38.5-yard punting average his senior year.

== Professional career ==
After going undrafted in the 1974 NFL draft, Roberts signed with the Houston Texans of the World Football League after an impressive workout. He practiced punting alone while with the Texans and claimed to have a 45-yard average. He was released before ever playing for the Texans.

Roberts was signed by the St. Louis Cardinals of the National Football League on July 18, 1974. He played in all 14 games for the Cardinals in 1974, punting 81 times for 3,131 yards (a 38.7 average). He also appeared in one playoff game, punting seven times for 255 yards (a 36.4 average). Roberts was released on September 9, 1975.
