= John Saunders (American football) =

American football player (born 1950)

No. 21, 33
- Position: Defensive back

Personal information
- Born: April 29, 1950; Toledo, Ohio, U.S.
- Died: February 11, 2001 (aged 50)
- Listed height: 6 ft 3 in (1.91 m)
- Listed weight: 198 lb (90 kg)

Career information
- High school: Macomber-Whitney (OH)
- College: Toledo
- NFL draft: 1972: 4th round, 87th overall pick

Career history
- Buffalo Bills (1972); San Francisco 49ers (1974–1975)
- Stats at Pro Football Reference

John Wesley Saunders III (born April 29, 1950 – February 11, 2001) was an American football defensive back. He played for the Buffalo Bills in 1972 and the San Francisco 49ers in 1974 and 1975.
