= Rhett Dawson =

American football player (born 1948)

No. 20, 25, 86
- Position: Wide receiver

Personal information
- Born: December 22, 1948 (age 77); Valdosta, Georgia, U.S.
- Listed height: 6 ft 1 in (1.85 m)
- Listed weight: 185 lb (84 kg)

Career information
- High school: Valdosta
- College: Florida State
- NFL draft: 1972: 10th round, 240th overall pick

Career history
- Houston Oilers (1972); Minnesota Vikings (1973); Saskatchewan Roughriders (1974–1976)

Awards and highlights
- Third-team All-American (1971)

Career NFL statistics
- Receptions: 8
- Yards: 102
- Touchdowns: 1
- Stats at Pro Football Reference

Career CFL statistics
- Receptions: 148
- Yards: 2,419
- Yards: 23

Rhett Motte Dawson (born December 22, 1948) is an American former professional football player who was a wide receiver in the National Football League (NFL) and Canadian Football League (CFL). He played college football for the Florida State Seminoles. Dawson was selected by the Houston Oilers in the tenth round of the 1972 NFL draft and also played in the NFL for the Minnesota Vikings. He played in the CFL for the Saskatchewan Roughriders.

His brother, Red Dawson, also played in the NFL and coached at Marshall University.
