= 1971 NCAA University Division football season =

American college football season

- Preseason AP No. 1: Notre Dame
- Regular season: September 10 – December 4, 1971
- Number of bowls: 12
- Bowl games: December 18, 1971 – January 1, 1972
- Champion(s): Nebraska (AP, Coaches FWAA, NFF)
- Heisman: Auburn quarterback Pat Sullivan

The 1971 NCAA University Division football season saw Coach Bob Devaney's Nebraska Cornhuskers repeat as national champions. Ranked a close second behind Notre Dame in the preseason poll, Nebraska moved up to first place the following week, remained there for the rest of 1971, and convincingly won the Orange Bowl 38–6 in a No. 1 vs. No. 2 game against Alabama.

Prior to the 1971 season, two programs were elevated to the University Division. The new programs were Temple and Texas–Arlington. The change brought the total number of programs in the University Division to 119.

During the 20th century, the NCAA had no playoff for major college football in its University Division (now the Football Bowl Subdivision in Division I). The NCAA Football Guide, however, did note an "unofficial national champion" based on the top ranked teams in the "wire service" (AP and UPI) polls. The "writers' poll" by Associated Press (AP) was the most popular, followed by the "coaches' poll" by United Press International) (UPI). Prior to the 1974 season, the UPI issued its final poll before the bowls, but since the 1968 season, the AP Trophy was withheld until the postseason was completed. The AP poll in 1971 consisted of the votes of as many as 55 sportswriters, though not all of them voted in every poll. Those who cast votes would give their opinion of the ten best teams. Under a point system of 20 points for first place, 19 for second, etc., the "overall" ranking was determined.

== Rule changes ==
- The crackback block was outlawed.
- Punts that land in the end zone untouched will result in an automatic touchback.
- Team time-outs were reduced from four to three.
- After penalties, the clock restarts on the ready-for-play signal. Previously, the clock started after penalties on the snap.
- Penalties occurring behind the scrimmage line are enforced from the previous spot instead of the spot of the foul.

== Conference and program changes ==
- The Mid-Eastern Athletic Conference played its first season of football this year, albeit in the NCAA College Division, not the NCAA University Division; membership included Delaware State, Howard, Maryland Eastern Shore, Morgan State, North Carolina A&T, North Carolina Central, and South Carolina State.
- The New England Small College Athletic Conference, now a Division III conference, began football play in 1971.

School	1970 Conference	1971 Conference
Bradley Braves	Independent	Dropped Program
Buffalo Bulls	Independent	Dropped Program
Drake Bulldogs	Independent	Missouri Valley
Louisiana Tech Bulldogs	Gulf States	Southland
Southwestern Louisiana Ragin' Cajuns	Gulf States	Southland
South Carolina Gamecocks	ACC	Independent
West Texas State Buffaloes	Independent	Missouri Valley

== Regular season ==
=== September ===
In the preseason poll released on September 6, Notre Dame was ranked No. 1, and defending champion Nebraska was second. Nebraska had more first place votes (26) than Notre Dame (15), but fewer points overall (870 vs. 885). Texas, Michigan and USC rounded out the Top Five.

September 10–11
On Friday night in Los Angeles, No. 16 Alabama beat No. 5 USC, 17–10, marking a successful debut for Bear Bryant's new Wishbone offense. The next day, No. 2 Nebraska won its opener at home, 34–7 over Oregon. No. 4 Michigan won 21–6 at No. 20 Northwestern. No. 11 Ohio State defeated Iowa 52−21. No. 1 Notre Dame and No. 3 Texas did not start their seasons until the following week. In the poll that followed, Nebraska received 31 of the 50 first place votes and moved up to No. 1. The remainder of the top five were No. 2 Notre Dame, No. 3 Texas, No. 4 Michigan, and No. 5 Ohio State.

September 18
No. 1 Nebraska beat Minnesota 35–7, and No. 2 Notre Dame opened with a 50–7 win over Northwestern. No. 3 Texas won its opener 28–10 at UCLA, and No. 4 Michigan shut out Virginia 56–0,. No. 5 Ohio State was idle, and No. 7 Auburn, which beat UT-Chattanooga 60–7, moved up to fifth place in the next poll. The top four remained the same.

September 25
No. 1 Nebraska beat Texas A&M, 34–7. No. 2 Notre Dame narrowly won at Purdue, 8–7. No. 3 Texas beat Texas Tech 28–0, and No. 4 Michigan defeated visiting UCLA 38–0. No. 5 Auburn edged No. 9 Tennessee at home, 10–9. The next poll featured No. 1 Nebraska, No. 2 Michigan, No. 3 Texas, No. 4 Notre Dame, and No. 5 Auburn.

=== October ===
October 2
Fifteen of the Top 20 teams remained unbeaten, including the Top 12. No. 1 Nebraska handled Utah State in Lincoln, 42–6, while No. 2 Michigan registered its third straight shutout at home, beating Navy 46–0. No. 3 Texas defeated Oregon 35–7, No. 4 Notre Dame beat Michigan State 14–2, but fell to seventh in the next poll. No. 5 Auburn beat Kentucky 38–6. No. 6 Colorado, which had defeated Ohio State in Columbus the previous week, beat Kansas State 31–21. The next poll featured No. 1 Nebraska, No. 2 Michigan, No. 3 Texas, No. 4 Auburn, and No. 5 Colorado.

October 9
In their first Big Eight conference game and first on the road, No. 1 Nebraska shut out Missouri 36–0. No. 2 Michigan won at Michigan State, 24–13, while No. 3 Texas lost to No. 8 Oklahoma in their rivalry game at the Cotton Bowl in Dallas, 48–27. No. 4 Auburn beat Southern Miss 27–14. No. 5 Colorado won 24–14 at Iowa State, but dropped in the poll to sixth, while No. 6 Alabama won 42–0 at Vanderbilt and moved up. The next poll featured No. 1 Nebraska, No. 2 Oklahoma, No. 3 Michigan, No. 4 Alabama, and No. 5 Auburn.

October 16
Top-ranked Nebraska crushed Kansas 55–0, raising its record to 6–0 and outscoring its opposition 238–27. No. 2 Oklahoma beat visiting No. 6 Colorado 45–17 and No. 3 Michigan beat Illinois 35–6. No. 4 Alabama beat No. 14 Tennessee 32–15 at Birmingham and No. 5 Auburn won over Georgia Tech in Atlanta, 31–14. The top five remained the same.

October 23
Seven of the top eight teams stayed unbeaten, all playing unranked opponents. No. 1 Nebraska allowed Oklahoma State to reach double digits (all previous opponents had scored 7 points or less), but easily won at Stillwater, 41–13. No. 2 Oklahoma decimated Kansas State 75–28 in Manhattan. No. 3 Michigan won 35–7 at Minnesota, No. 4 Alabama hosted Houston and won 34−20, while No. 5 Auburn beat Clemson 35–13. The top five remained the same.

October 30
No. 1 Nebraska handed visiting No. 9 Colorado a 31–7 defeat, and No. 2 Oklahoma beat Iowa State 43–12. No. 3 Michigan rolled over Indiana 61–7, and No. 4 Alabama beat Mississippi State 41–10 at Jackson. No. 5 Auburn beat Florida 40–7. The top five again remained the same.

All of the aforementioned games were overshadowed by the death of TCU head coach Jim Pittman, who suffered a massive heart attack during the Horned Frogs' rivalry game with Baylor in Waco. TCU somehow overcame its grief to oust the Bears 34–27. Pittman was in his first season at Fort Worth after five seasons at Tulane, where he had guided the Green Wave to an 8–4 record in his final season of 1970, capped off by a 17–3 victory over Colorado in the Liberty Bowl.

=== November ===
November 6
No. 1 Nebraska beat Iowa State 37–0 and No. 2 Oklahoma won 20–3 at Missouri. No. 3 Michigan crushed Iowa, 63–7, and No. 4 Alabama won at No. 18 LSU, 14–7. No. 5 Auburn beat Mississippi State 30–21, while No. 6 Penn State won 63–27 over Maryland. The next poll featured No. 1 Nebraska, No. 2 Oklahoma, No. 3 Michigan, No. 4 Alabama, and No. 5 Penn State, with all five teams (as well as No. 6 Auburn and No. 7 Georgia) being undefeated and untied.

November 13
No. 1 Nebraska won at Kansas State 44–17, and No. 2 Oklahoma beat Kansas 56–10. No. 3 Michigan narrowly won at Purdue, 20–17, and No. 4 Alabama defeated the visiting Miami Hurricanes, 31–3. No. 5 Penn State beat North Carolina State 35–3, but still dropped to sixth after a matchup of two undefeated SEC teams. No. 6 Auburn and No. 7 Georgia met at Athens, with Auburn winning a decisive 35–20 victory. The next poll featured No. 1 Nebraska, No. 2 Oklahoma, No. 3 Michigan, No. 4 Alabama, and No. 5 Auburn.

November 20
Four of the top five teams were idle. No. 1 Nebraska and No. 2 Oklahoma prepared for their Thanksgiving Day meeting in Norman, while No. 4 Alabama and No. 5 Auburn prepared for their season closer in the Iron Bowl in Birmingham. Unusually for a game during the evenly-matched "Ten Year War", undefeated Michigan had already clinched the Big Ten title and a Rose Bowl berth against Pac-8 champion Stanford, while Ohio State was unranked with a relatively pedestrian 6−3 record. The Buckeyes gave the No. 3−ranked Wolverines all they could handle, but Michigan prevailed 10–7. The next poll featured No. 1 Nebraska, No. 2 Oklahoma, No. 3 Alabama, No. 4 Michigan, and No. 5 Auburn.

November 25–27
As the regular season neared its close, four undefeated and untied teams met in rivalry games which were de facto semifinals for the national championship. On Thanksgiving Day, No. 1 Nebraska (10–0) and No. 2 Oklahoma (9–0) met on the Sooners' field in a game that would determine the Big Eight title, the No. 1 ranking, and a trip to the Orange Bowl in Miami. In the decade's Game of the Century, Nebraska won a classic back-and-forth battle 35–31; Husker I-back Jeff Kinney scored his fourth and game-deciding touchdown with 98 seconds left, capping a 5½-minute, 74-yard drive. Later that weekend, No. 3 Alabama (10–0) and No. 5 Auburn (9–0) played their annual season-ender at Birmingham with the SEC championship at stake, and Alabama handed the Tigers their first loss, 31–7. As SEC champion, Alabama was invited to, but not obligated to play in, the Sugar Bowl; they deferred and accepted a bid to play top-ranked Nebraska in the Orange Bowl. Auburn went to the Sugar Bowl instead, to face Oklahoma in a meeting of conference runners-up. Undefeated No. 6 Penn State was idle, but moved up in the next poll: No. 1 Nebraska, No. 2 Alabama, No. 3 Oklahoma, No. 4 Michigan, and No. 5 Penn State.

=== December ===
December 4
No. 1 Nebraska (11–0) had NCAA permission to play a twelfth game against Hawaii; they beat the Rainbows 45–3 and ended the regular season at 12–0. No. 2 Alabama and No. 4 Michigan had finished their seasons. No. 3 Oklahoma's season ender was in state at Stillwater against Oklahoma State, which the Sooners easily won 58–14. No. 5 Penn State faced No. 12 Tennessee (8–2), at Knoxville but lost 31–11 for their only defeat of the season. Nevertheless, the Nittany Lions would play SWC champion Texas in the Cotton Bowl. With the exception of Big Ten champion Michigan, the final regular season poll was dominated by Big 8 and SEC teams: No. 1 Nebraska, No. 2 Alabama, No. 3 Oklahoma (lost only to Nebraska), No. 4 Michigan, No. 5 Auburn (lost only to Alabama), No. 6 Georgia (lost only to Auburn), and No. 7 Colorado (lost only to Nebraska and Oklahoma).

== Conference standings ==
1971 Atlantic Coast Conference football standings
	Conf.					Overall
Team	W		L		T	W		L		T
North Carolina $	6	–	0	–	0	9	–	3	–	0
Clemson	4	–	2	–	0	5	–	6	–	0
Duke	2	–	3	–	0	6	–	5	–	0
Wake Forest	2	–	3	–	0	6	–	5	–	0
Virginia	2	–	3	–	0	3	–	8	–	0
NC State	2	–	4	–	0	3	–	8	–	0
Maryland	1	–	4	–	0	2	–	9	–	0
$ – Conference champion; Rankings from AP Poll

1971 Big Eight Conference football standings
	Conf.					Overall
Team	W		L		T	W		L		T
No. 1 Nebraska $	7	–	0	–	0	13	–	0	–	0
No. 2 Oklahoma	6	–	1	–	0	11	–	1	–	0
No. 3 Colorado	5	–	2	–	0	10	–	2	–	0
Iowa State	4	–	3	–	0	8	–	4	–	0
Kansas State	2	–	5	–	0	5	–	6	–	0
Oklahoma State	2	–	5	–	0	4	–	6	–	1
Kansas	2	–	5	–	0	4	–	7	–	0
Missouri	0	–	7	–	0	1	–	10	–	0
$ – Conference champion; Rankings from AP Poll

1971 Big Sky Conference football standings
	Conf.					Overall
Team	W		L		T	W		L		T
Idaho $	4	–	1	–	0	8	–	3	–	0
No. 7 Boise State	4	–	2	–	0	10	–	2	–	0
Montana	3	–	2	–	0	6	–	5	–	0
Weber State	3	–	2	–	1	7	–	2	–	1
Idaho State	2	–	3	–	0	6	–	4	–	0
Northern Arizona	1	–	3	–	0	5	–	5	–	0
Montana State	0	–	5	–	1	2	–	7	–	1
$ – Conference champion; Rankings from AP small college poll

1971 Big Ten Conference football standings
	Conf.					Overall
Team	W		L		T	W		L		T
No. 6 Michigan $	8	–	0	–	0	11	–	1	–	0
Northwestern	6	–	3	–	0	7	–	4	–	0
Ohio State	5	–	3	–	0	6	–	4	–	0
Michigan State	5	–	3	–	0	6	–	5	–	0
Illinois	5	–	3	–	0	5	–	6	–	0
Wisconsin	3	–	5	–	0	4	–	6	–	1
Minnesota	3	–	5	–	0	4	–	7	–	0
Purdue	3	–	5	–	0	3	–	7	–	0
Indiana	2	–	6	–	0	3	–	8	–	0
Iowa	1	–	8	–	0	1	–	10	–	0
$ – Conference champion; Rankings from AP Poll

1971 Ivy League football standings
	Conf.					Overall
Team	W		L		T	W		L		T
Dartmouth +	6	–	1	–	0	8	–	1	–	0
Cornell +	6	–	1	–	0	8	–	1	–	0
Columbia	5	–	2	–	0	6	–	3	–	0
Harvard	4	–	3	–	0	5	–	4	–	0
Yale	3	–	4	–	0	4	–	5	–	0
Princeton	3	–	4	–	0	4	–	5	–	0
Penn	1	–	6	–	0	2	–	7	–	0
Brown	0	–	7	–	0	0	–	9	–	0
+ – Conference co-champions

1971 Mid-American Conference football standings
	Conf.					Overall
Team	W		L		T	W		L		T
No. 14 Toledo $	5	–	0	–	0	12	–	0	–	0
Bowling Green	4	–	1	–	0	6	–	4	–	0
Western Michigan	2	–	3	–	0	7	–	3	–	0
Miami (OH)	2	–	3	–	0	7	–	3	–	0
Ohio	2	–	3	–	0	5	–	5	–	0
Kent State	0	–	5	–	0	3	–	8	–	0
$ – Conference champion; Rankings from AP Poll

1971 Missouri Valley Conference football standings
	Conf.					Overall
Team	W		L		T	W		L		T
Memphis State $	4	–	1	–	0	5	–	6	–	0
Louisville	3	–	2	–	0	6	–	3	–	1
Tulsa	3	–	2	–	0	4	–	7	–	0
North Texas State	3	–	2	–	0	3	–	8	–	0
Drake	2	–	3	–	0	7	–	4	–	0
West Texas State	1	–	4	–	0	2	–	9	–	0
Wichita State	0	–	5	–	0	3	–	8	–	0
New Mexico State *	0	–	0	–	0	5	–	5	–	1
$ – Conference champion; * – New Mexico State was ineligible for conference play, but its games against Drake, North Texas State, West Texas State, and Wichita State counted in the conference standings for its opponents. Drake's game against Tampa, Memphis State's games against Cincinnati and Southern Miss, and Tulsa's games against BYU and Virginia Tech were also designated as conference games.

1971 Pacific Coast Athletic Association football standings
	Conf.					Overall
Team	W		L		T	W		L		T
Long Beach State $	5	–	1	–	0	8	–	4	–	0
San Jose State	4	–	1	–	0	5	–	6	–	1
Fresno State	3	–	2	–	0	6	–	5	–	0
San Diego State	2	–	3	–	0	6	–	5	–	0
UC Santa Barbara	2	–	3	–	0	3	–	8	–	0
Pacific (CA)	1	–	4	–	0	3	–	8	–	0
Cal State Los Angeles	0	–	3	–	0	2	–	8	–	0
$ – Conference champion

1971 Pacific-8 Conference football standings
	Conf.					Overall
Team	W		L		T	W		L		T
No. 10 Stanford $	6	–	1	–	0	9	–	3	–	0
No. 20 USC	3	–	2	–	1	6	–	4	–	1
No. 19 Washington	4	–	3	–	0	8	–	3	–	0
California	4	–	3	–	0	6	–	5	–	0
Oregon State	3	–	3	–	0	5	–	6	–	0
Oregon	2	–	4	–	0	5	–	6	–	0
Washington State	2	–	5	–	0	4	–	7	–	0
UCLA	1	–	4	–	1	2	–	7	–	1
$ – Conference champion; Rankings from AP Poll

1971 Southern Conference football standings
	Conf.					Overall
Team	W		L		T	W		L		T
Richmond $	5	–	1	–	0	5	–	6	–	0
William & Mary	4	–	1	–	0	5	–	6	–	0
The Citadel	4	–	2	–	0	8	–	3	–	0
East Carolina	3	–	2	–	0	4	–	6	–	1
Furman	2	–	3	–	0	5	–	5	–	1
VMI	1	–	4	–	0	1	–	10	–	0
Davidson	0	–	6	–	0	1	–	9	–	0
$ – Conference champion

1971 Southeastern Conference football standings
	Conf.					Overall
Team	W		L		T	W		L		T
No. 4 Alabama $	7	–	0	–	0	11	–	1	–	0
No. 7 Georgia	5	–	1	–	0	11	–	1	–	0
No. 12 Auburn	5	–	1	–	0	9	–	2	–	0
No. 15 Ole Miss	4	–	2	–	0	10	–	2	–	0
No. 9 Tennessee	4	–	2	–	0	10	–	2	–	0
No. 11 LSU	3	–	2	–	0	9	–	3	–	0
Vanderbilt	1	–	5	–	0	4	–	6	–	1
Florida	1	–	6	–	0	4	–	7	–	0
Kentucky	1	–	6	–	0	3	–	8	–	0
Mississippi State	1	–	7	–	0	2	–	9	–	0
$ – Conference champion; Rankings from AP Poll

1971 Southwest Conference football standings
	Conf.					Overall
Team	W		L		T	W		L		T
No. 18 Texas $	6	–	1	–	0	8	–	3	–	0
No. 16 Arkansas	5	–	1	–	1	8	–	3	–	1
TCU	5	–	2	–	0	6	–	4	–	1
Texas A&M	4	–	3	–	0	5	–	6	–	0
SMU	3	–	4	–	0	4	–	7	–	0
Rice	2	–	4	–	1	3	–	7	–	1
Texas Tech	2	–	5	–	0	4	–	7	–	0
Baylor	0	–	7	–	0	1	–	9	–	0
$ – Conference champion; Rankings from AP Poll

1971 Western Athletic Conference football standings
	Conf.					Overall
Team	W		L		T	W		L		T
No. 8 Arizona State $	7	–	0	–	0	11	–	1	–	0
New Mexico	5	–	1	–	0	6	–	3	–	2
Arizona	3	–	3	–	0	5	–	6	–	0
BYU	3	–	4	–	0	5	–	6	–	0
Wyoming	3	–	4	–	0	5	–	6	–	0
Utah	3	–	4	–	0	3	–	8	–	0
Colorado State	1	–	4	–	0	3	–	8	–	0
UTEP	1	–	6	–	0	5	–	6	–	0
$ – Conference champion; Rankings from AP Poll

1971 NCAA University Division independents football records
	Conf.			Overall
Team	W	L	T	W		L		T
No. 5 Penn State		–		11	–	1	–	0
Boston College		–		9	–	2	–	0
No. 17 Houston		–		9	–	3	–	0
No. 13 Notre Dame		–		8	–	2	–	0
Utah State		–		8	–	3	–	0
Florida State		–		8	–	4	–	0
Cincinnati		–		7	–	4	–	0
West Virginia		–		7	–	4	–	0
Temple		–		6	–	2	–	1
Air Force		–		6	–	4	–	0
Army		–		6	–	4	–	0
Colgate		–		6	–	4	–	0
Villanova		–		6	–	4	–	1
South Carolina		–		6	–	5	–	0
Southern Miss		–		6	–	5	–	0
Georgia Tech		–		6	–	6	–	0
Northern Illinois		–		5	–	5	–	1
Syracuse		–		5	–	5	–	1
Dayton		–		5	–	6	–	0
Holy Cross		–		4	–	6	–	0
Miami (FL)		–		4	–	7	–	0
Rutgers		–		4	–	7	–	0
Virginia Tech		–		4	–	7	–	0
Navy		–		3	–	8	–	0
Pittsburgh		–		3	–	8	–	0
Tulane		–		3	–	8	–	0
Marshall		–		2	–	8	–	0
Xavier		–		1	–	9	–	0
Rankings from AP Poll

== Bowl games ==
=== Major bowls ===
Saturday, January 1, 1972

BOWL	Winner	Score	Runner-up
COTTON	No. 10 Penn State Nittany Lions	30–6	No. 12 Texas Longhorns
SUGAR	No. 3 Oklahoma Sooners	40–22	No. 5 Auburn Tigers
ROSE	No. 16 Stanford Indians ^	13–12	No. 4 Michigan Wolverines
ORANGE	No. 1 Nebraska Cornhuskers	38–6	No. 2 Alabama Crimson Tide

^ Last game in which Stanford used nickname "Indians"; it was changed to "Cardinals" early in 1972, and to the singular "Cardinal" in 1982.

With No. 1 Nebraska slated to play No. 2 Alabama in the Orange Bowl on New Year's night, there was little suspense as to which game or games would decide the national title. No. 3 Michigan held out the slim hope that, if they handily defeated Stanford while Nebraska or Alabama barely won or tied, they could leapfrog both teams into the top position. For the second year in a row in the Rose Bowl, underdog Stanford rallied to defeat the undefeated Big Ten champion, besting Michigan 13–12 on a last second field goal by Rod Garcia. (He had missed all five of his kicks (four field goals and an extra point) when Stanford was upset by San Jose State on November 13, by the same score.)

In the final game of the day, Nebraska walloped Alabama in the Orange Bowl 38–6 to claim its second straight national title. Earlier in the day at the Sugar Bowl, Oklahoma intercepted Heisman Trophy winner Pat Sullivan three times and easily handled Auburn 40–22,and regained the runner-up ranking in the final poll. With bowl losses by No. 2 Alabama, No. 3 Michigan, and No. 5 Auburn, sixth-ranked Colorado, winner of the Bluebonnet Bowl, rose to third. The Big Eight occupied the top three spots in the final AP poll, with Nebraska receiving all 55 first place votes; Oklahoma was second, and Colorado (whose only losses were to Nebraska and Oklahoma) climbed to third. This was the first time that two teams from the same conference topped the final poll, and it remains as the only time that a conference had the top three.

1. Nebraska, 1100 (55), 13–0
2. Oklahoma, 990, 11–1
3. Colorado, 746, 10–2
4. Alabama, 674, 11–1
5. Penn State, 666, 11–1
6. Michigan, 479, 11–1
7. Georgia, 471, 11–1
8. Arizona State, 414, 11–1
9. Tennessee, 379, 10–2
10. Stanford, 347, 9–3

=== Other bowls ===
BOWL	City	State	Date	Winner	Score	Runner-up
SUN	El Paso	Texas	December 18	No. 11 LSU	33–15	Iowa State
GATOR	Jacksonville	Florida	December 31	No. 6 Georgia	7–3	North Carolina
TANGERINE	Orlando	Florida	December 28	No. 14 Toledo	28–3	Richmond
ASTRO-BLUEBONNET	Houston	Texas	December 31	No. 7 Colorado	29–17	No. 15 Houston
LIBERTY	Memphis	Tennessee	December 20	No. 9 Tennessee	14–13	No. 18 Arkansas
PEACH	Atlanta	Georgia	December 30	No. 17 Mississippi	41–18	Georgia Tech
FIESTA (debut)	Tempe	Arizona	December 27	No. 8 Arizona State	45–38	Florida State
MERCY	Los Angeles	California	December 11	Cal State Fullerton	17–14	Fresno State
PASADENA	Pasadena	California	December 18	Memphis State	28–9	San Jose State

- Prior to the 1975 season, the Big Ten and Pac-8 conferences allowed only one postseason participant each, for the Rose Bowl.
- Notre Dame refused an invitation to the Gator Bowl after Irish players overwhelmingly voted to turn down any invitation from a non-New Year's Day bowl.

== Heisman Trophy voting ==
The Heisman Trophy is given to the year's most outstanding player

Player	School	Position	1st	Total
Pat Sullivan	Auburn	QB	355	1,597
Ed Marinaro	Cornell	RB	295	1,445
Greg Pruitt	Oklahoma	RB	64	586
Johnny Musso	Alabama	RB	23	365
Lydell Mitchell	Penn State	RB	29	251
Jack Mildren	Oklahoma	QB	35	208
Jerry Tagge	Nebraska	QB	23	168
Chuck Ealey	Toledo	QB	31	137
Walt Patulski	Notre Dame	DE	8	121
Eric Allen	Michigan State	RB	15	109

== Statistical leaders ==
=== Rushing ===
The following players were the individual leaders in rushing during the 1971 University Division season:

Rank	Player	Team	Games	Yds	Rushes	Avg	TD
1	Ed Marinaro	Cornell	9	1881	356	5.3	24
2	Robert Newhouse	Houston	11	1757	277	6.3	12
3	Terry Metcalf	Long Beach State	12	1673	267	6.3	28
4	Greg Pruitt	Oklahoma	11	1665	178	9.4	17
5	Lydell Mitchell	Penn State	11	1567	254	6.2	26
6	Eric Allen	Michigan State	11	1494	259	5.8	18
7	Howard Stevens	Louisville	10	1429	250	5.7	12
8	Charlie Davis	Colorado	11	1386	219	6.3	10
9	George Amundson	Iowa State	11	1316	287	4.6	15
10	Jon Hall	The Citadel	11	123-	169	7.3	9

== See also ==
- 1971 NCAA University Division football rankings
- 1971 College Football All-America Team
