= History of Memphis Tigers football =

History of football team representing the University of Memphis

This page documents the history of the Memphis Tigers football program.

== Overview ==
=== Early history (1912–1974) ===
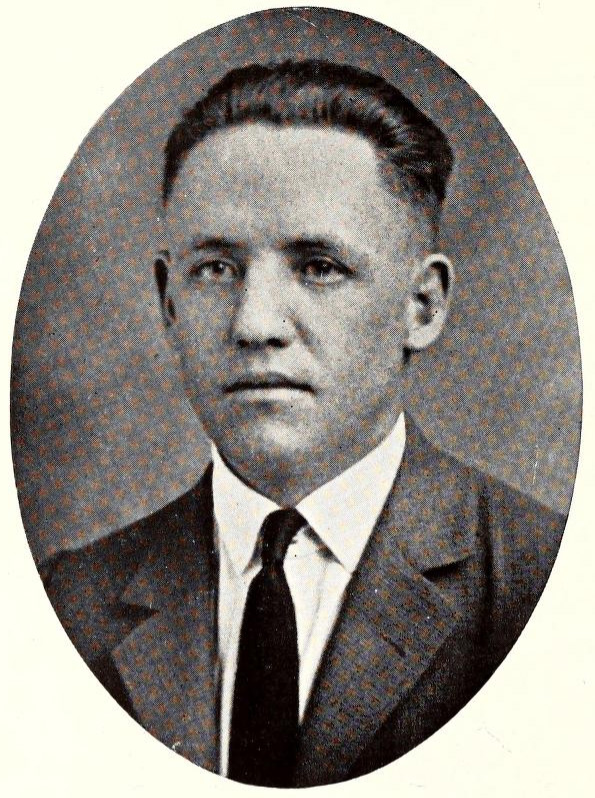
Lester Barnard pictured in The DeSoto 1923, Memphis yearbook

West Tennessee State Normal School's football team had their first season in 1912. The team was coached by Clyde Wilson. In 1922, Lester Barnard was the Tigers head coach. His team compiled a 5–2–2 record. Zach Curlin succeeded Barnard and served as the Tigers head coach from 1924 to 1936. During Curlin's tenure, the school was a member of two athletic conferences, the Mississippi Valley Conference (1928–1934) and the Southern Intercollegiate Athletic Association (1935–1941). When Curlin stepped down as the football coach after the 1936 campaign, the school's search committee recommended Allyn McKeen and immediately hired Cecil C. Humphreys as the school's president from Tennessee Junior College in Martin, now named the University of Tennessee at Martin. McKeen's 1937 squad posted a 3–6 record, setting the stage for the Tigers' only undefeated and untied season in school history. Allyn McKeen coached the Tigers in the 1937 and 1938 seasons, compiling a 13–6 record. His 1938 team went undefeated at 10–0. McKeen departed the Tigers after two seasons to accept the head football coach position at Mississippi State and was inducted into the College Football Hall of Fame as a coach in 1991.

West Tennessee State Teacher's College changed its name to Memphis State College in 1941. After that year, the Tigers became an independent and remained so until joining the Missouri Valley Conference in 1968. Despite fielding a 56-player team in 1942, one of the largest in school history to that point, Memphis State managed to compile only a 2–7 record in 1942 due to many players being chosen for selective service for World War II. The Tigers did not field a football team from 1943 to 1946 due to the events surrounding World War II. In 1947, athletics director Cecil Humphreys turned to his former college teammate at the University of Tennessee, Ralph Hatley, head coach at Christian Brothers High School in Memphis, to lead the football program. One of his first moves as head coach was to name Billy Murphy as an assistant coach. Hatley's first Tigers team in 1947 had 38 freshmen, but still managed to earn a 6–2–1 record. In 1949, Hatley's Tigers outscored their opponents 385–87 throughout the season and led the nation in total points scored for the season. In 1949, Memphis State finished 9–2 and set a then-school record with 21,000 in attendance to watch the team play Ole Miss. Hatley hired Ken Donahue as line coach in 1951. During Hatley's tenure as head coach, Memphis State graduated 98% of its football players. Hatley's Tigers made their first bowl appearance in school history in the 1956 Burley Bowl, a 32–12 victory over East Tennessee that was the final playing of the Johnson City, Tennessee bowl game. Hatley retired as head coach after the 1957 season with a 60–43–5 record. He retired as the school's winningest head coach and remained so until he was surpassed by his successor in 1967.

Billy Murphy took over as head coach in 1958 and served as head football coach for the Tigers for fourteen seasons. In 1963, Murphy led the Tigers to a 9–0–1 record. After a season-opening win over Southern Miss, the Tigers tied No. 2 Ole Miss by a score of 0–0. That game would be the only non-win for Memphis that year as the Tigers went on to grab wins over Tulsa, North Texas, West Texas State, Mississippi State, Louisville, South Carolina, Chattanooga and Houston to post just the second unbeaten season in program history. The Houston game was postponed from November 23 to November 30 following the assassination of President John F. Kennedy. Murphy was named the National Coach of the Year by the Detroit Times and was also named a recipient of the Memphis Civilian Award. Running back Dave Casinelli became the first Memphis State player to lead the NCAA in a major individual statistical category and the first Southern player to win the NCAA rushing title since John Dottley in 1949. Going into the final game of the 1963 season, he ranked third in rushing yardage but totaled 210 rushing yards in the final game to finish ahead of Jimmy Sidle and Gale Sayers. He led the NCAA for the 1963 season in rushing yardage (1,016 yards) and rushing carries (219). He also tied with Cosmo Iacavazzi for the national scoring title with 84 points, each having scored 14 touchdowns. During his four years at Memphis, Casinelli established school records with 2,796 total yards from scrimmage and 36 career touchdowns. In January 1964, he signed with the Edmonton Eskimos of the Canadian Football League. The 1963 Tigers football team finished ranked No. 14 in the UPI Coaches Poll, the highest final ranking in school history. Memphis State ended its 27-year run as an independent when it joined the Missouri Valley Conference in 1968. Murphy retired as head coach after the 1971 season but remained as the school's athletics director until 1981. His last game as head coach was the 1971 Pasadena Bowl, a 28–9 victory over San Jose State, their second bowl appearance in school history and last for another 32 years. He left Memphis with a 91–44–1 record, making him the winningest head coach in program history.

The program's next head coach was Fred Pancoast, who came to Memphis State from his post as offensive coordinator at Georgia under Vince Dooley. After a mediocre 5–5–1 record in 1972, the Tigers finished the 1973 season with an 8–3 record. The 1973 season included a 28–21 win over Louisville in the season opener, a 24–3 victory over North Texas in the season's second game and a 17–13 victory over Ole Miss in the third game for the Tigers' first victory over the Rebels in the state of Mississippi. Despite a 35–21 loss to No. 15 Houston, the Tigers defeated Tulsa by a score of 28–16, Florida State by a margin of 13–10 Virginia Tech in a 49–16 rout and their last two games of the season over Louisiana-Lafayette by a score of 41–6 and Cincinnati by a margin of 17–13 after a 13–10 loss to Southern Miss in the Black and Blue Bowl on November 10. Memphis State left the Missouri Valley Conference after the 1973 season and returned to play as an independent, where it would remain until chartering Conference USA in 1995. The 1974 season resulted in a 7–4 record. Highlights of the season included a 16–10 victory over Louisville in the season opener, a 15–7 victory over Ole Miss for the Tigers second straight victory over the Rebels, a 20–18 victory over Colorado State, a 41–0 shutout of North Texas, a 42–14 win over Florida State, and a 34–10 victory over Wichita State in the season finale. Pancoast left the Tigers after the 1974 season to accept the head coaching position at Vanderbilt. In three seasons, he led the Tigers to a 20–12–1 record. Pancoast would be the last head coach to leave the Tigers with a winning record for 41 years.

=== Richard Williamson era (1975–1980) ===
Arkansas offensive coordinator Richard Williamson was hired as the Tigers' 15th head football coach after Fred Pancoast's departure. An end at Alabama from 1959 to 1962 under head coach Bear Bryant, Williamson served as wide receivers coach for the Crimson Tide under Bryant from 1963 to 1967 returned to Alabama to coach the defensive line under Bryant from 1970 to 1971 after serving as an assistant coach under Frank Broyles at Arkansas from 1968 to 1969. He returned to Broyles' Razorbacks staff to serve as offensive coordinator in 1972. Williamson went 32–34 in six seasons as head coach of the Tigers. Williamson was honored with the Southern Independent Conference Coach of the Year award twice as head coach of the Tigers.

The Tigers finished 7–4 in 1975. They began the season on September 6 with a 17–7 loss to Mississippi State. After a 31–20 upset victory over No. 7 Auburn, Memphis State lost their next two: 13–3 to Cincinnati and 29–10 to Arkansas State. The Tigers defeated North Texas by a margin of 21–19 on October 4. After a 21–7 loss to rival Southern Miss, Williamson's team won their last five games of the season, defeating rival Louisville 41–7 on October 18, Tulsa 16–14 on October 25, Wichita State 13–7 on November 1, Florida State 17–14 on November 8 and Houston 14–7 on November 15. Memphis State went 8–3 in 1976. The Tigers started the season with a 21–16 win over Ole Miss on September 4 and a 21–12 win over Florida State on September 11. After a close 16–14 loss to Tulsa, Memphis State defeated SMU by a count of 27–13 and Auburn by a margin of 28–27. After a 42–33 loss to Mississippi State, the Tigers shut out Wichita State by a count of 31–0 and defeated Tulane by a score of 14–7. After a 21–14 loss to in-state foe Tennessee, the Tigers defeated Louisville by a score of 26–14 and suffered a 14–12 letdown at the hands of rival Southern Miss in the season finale. Williamson's Tigers finished with a 6–5 record in 1977. In their first game after the death of rock-n-roll legend and longtime Memphis resident Elvis Presley, the Tigers lost to Ole Miss in Jackson, Mississippi by a score of 7–3. Memphis State rebounded to win their next three, defeating Tulane by a score of 27–9, Utah State by a margin of 31–26 and Virginia Tech by a count of 21–20. After dropping a 14–13 nail biter to Louisville on October 1, the Tigers defeated Mississippi State by a margin of 21–13 on October 15. Memphis State then lost a nail biter to North Texas by a count of 20–19. After a 42–14 victory over Southern Miss in the Black and Blue Bowl, Williamson's squad lost to Tennessee by a score of 27–14 and No. 16 Florida State by a count of 30–9. Memphis State defeated Wichita State by a margin of 28–14 in the season's last game on November 19.

Memphis State finished with a 4–7 record in 1978. After a season-opening 14–7 loss to Ole Miss, Williamson led the Tigers to a 17–3 win over Houston The Tigers then lost their next two, falling to Mississippi State in a 44–14 blowout and No. 8 Texas A&M in a 58–0 shutout. After a 26–13 win over Wichita State, the Tigers lost a 13–10 nail biter to Southern Miss and a 41–24 game to Tulane. Memphis State won their next two, defeating Vanderbilt by a margin of 35–14 and Louisville by a count of 29–22. Williamson's Tigers lost their last two games of the season, suffering a 41–24 loss to North Texas and a 34–14 loss to Cincinnati. The Tigers finished 5–6 in 1979. Memphis State started the season with a close 14–13 win over Mississippi State on September 8. The next week, Williamson's team lost to the other Southeastern Conference team from the Magnolia State, Ole Miss, by a score of 38–34. After a 16–10 win in the season's third game over Wichita State, Memphis State lost to Texas A&M by a margin of 17–7, Louisiana-Monroe by a count of 21–20 and Southern Miss in a 22–0 shutout. The Tigers alternated between win and loss for the remainder of the season, defeating North Texas by a margin of 22–0, losing to Vanderbilt by a score of 13–3, defeating Louisville by a count of 10–6, losing to No. 5 Florida State by a margin of 66–17 and beating Cincinnati by a count of 23–17. Memphis State struggled to a 2–9 mark in 1980. The Tigers lost their first three games of the season, falling to Mississippi State by a score of 34–7, Ole Miss in a 61–7 blowout and Georgia Tech by a count of 17–8. Williamson's squad won its first game of the season on October 4, defeating Arkansas State by a count of 24–3. The Tigers lost to Louisville by a score of 38–14 on October 11. That was followed by a 29–10 loss to North Texas on October 18. After a 24–3 loss to No. 6 Florida State, the Tigers lost consecutive 14–10 games to Vanderbilt and Cincinnati before suffering a 21–16 setback to Tulane. The Tigers won their last game of the 1980 season, a 6–0 shutout over Wichita State. Williamson was fired as head coach of the Tigers after the 1980 season.

=== Rex Dockery era (1981–1983) ===
Texas Tech head coach Rex Dockery was named the Tigers' 16th head coach after Williamson's firing. After serving as a head coach at two different Tennessee high schools, Dockery had served as an assistant coach at Tennessee from 1970 to 1971 under Bill Battle, at Georgia Tech in 1972 under Bill Fulcher and at Vanderbilt from 1973 to 1974 under Steve Sloan before following Sloan to serve as his offensive coordinator at Texas Tech. When Steve Sloan left Texas Tech to take the head coaching position at Ole Miss in 1978, Dockery replaced him as the team's head coach. He coached at Texas Tech from 1978 to 1980, compiling a 15–16–2 record, and being named the Southwest Conference Coach of the Year in 1978.

Dockery's Tigers finished 1–10 in 1981. After starting the season with a 20–3 loss to No. 14 Mississippi State on September 5, Memphis State lost to No. 18 Florida State by a score of 10–5 on September 12. The next week, Memphis State lost to Ole Miss by a count of 7–3. The next week, the Tigers picked up their first win of the season and of the Dockery era by defeating Georgia Tech by a score of 28–15. After a 17–13 loss to Virginia Tech, Dockery's team suffered a 14–7 loss to Louisville. Dockery's squad was shut out in the Black and Blue Bowl by Southern Miss by a score of 10–0. After a 28–9 loss to in-state power Tennessee, Memphis State was shut out again, this time in a 26–0 loss to Vanderbilt. The Tigers put up seven points in each of their final two games, both losses: 38–7 to Cincinnati and 24–7 to Tulane.

Memphis State compiled another 1–10 record in 1982. The Tigers lost to Ole Miss by a score of 27–10 in the season opener. On September 11, they lost to Vanderbilt by a count of 24–14. Next came a 41–17 loss to Mississippi State followed by a 24–20 loss to Georgia Tech. Next was the Black and Blue Bowl, a game the Tigers lost to Southern Miss by a margin of 34–14. After a 16–7 loss to Cincinnati, the Tigers fell to their foes from down the Mississippi River, losing to Tulane by a score of 17–10. The Tigers put up 3 points in both of the next two weeks, both losses: 34–3 to No. 3 Georgia and 29–3 to Tennessee. On November 20, the Tigers lost their seventeenth straight game dating back to the previous season with a 38–19 loss to Louisville. That streak was snapped the following week, with the Tigers defeating Arkansas State by a score of 12–0 in the season's final game.

The Tigers improved in 1983, compiling a 6–4–1 record. Dockery led Memphis State to a 37–17 win over Ole Miss in the first game of the season. Memphis State scored 10 points each of the next two weeks, both losses: 24–10 to No. 8 North Carolina and 17–10 to Virginia Tech. On October 1, Memphis State lost to No. 6 Alabama by a score of 44–13. After a 28–25 victory over Tulane, the Tigers lost the Black and Blue Bowl to Southern Miss by a score of 27–20. Dockery then led his team to three straight victories, beating Vanderbilt by a margin of 24–7, Mississippi State by a count of 30–13 and Cincinnati by a count of 43–10. On November 19, Memphis State tied Arkansas State at 14–14. The Tigers cruised to an easy 45–7 victory over Louisville in the season finale on November 24.

Dockery was killed in a plane crash on December 12, 1983, in Lawrenceburg, Tennessee, en route to a speaking engagement before the city's quarterback club. Freshman defensive back Charles Greenhill, offensive coordinator Chris Faros, and booster Glenn Jones were also killed in the crash. On December 13, 1984, Dockery's widow Wallene filed a $182,000 lawsuit against Memphis State University and Coca-Cola seeking unpaid contractual payment obligations. In December 1983, the playing surface at the Liberty Bowl Memorial Stadium was named Rex Dockery Field, and was rededicated on October 30, 2013. Dockery had an 8–24–1 record as head coach at Memphis State.

=== Rey Dempsey era (1984–1985) ===
On December 26, 1983, Southern Illinois head coach Rey Dempsey was hired as Memphis State's 17th head football coach. Though he did not have ties to the Memphis area or to the Southern United States, Dempsey had enjoyed a moderately successful tenure as the Salukis' head coach, including leading Southern Illinois to the NCAA Division I-AA National Championship in 1983. Dempsey also served as head coach at Youngstown State from 1973 to 1974 and had served as head coach at two Ohio high schools from 1961 to 1970.

The Tigers finished 5–5–1 in 1984. Memphis State defeated Arkansas State by a margin of 17–2 in their first game under Dempsey. After a 22–6 loss to Ole Miss, the Tigers won their next two, defeating Cincinnati by a margin of 47–7 and Southern Miss in the Black and Blue Bowl by a score of 23–13. After tying No. 6 Florida State at 17–17, Memphis State won another two consecutive games, beating Louisiana-Lafayette by a margin of 20–7 and Mississippi State by a margin of 23–12. Dempsey's team lost its final four games of the season, falling to North Carolina by a score of 30–27, No. 8 Georgia by a margin of 13–3, Tennessee in a blowout by a score of 41–9 and in the season's final game to Tulane by a score of 14–9.

Memphis State compiled a 2–7–2 record in 1985. The Tigers started the season with a 37–6 blowout of Louisiana-Lafayette on August 31. The Tigers settled for ties the next two weeks, locking even in a 17–17 bout with Ole Miss and a 10–10 battle with I-AA opponent Murray State. Memphis State lost its next two, falling to No. 6 Florida State by a margin of 19–10 and Mississippi State by a nail-biting 31–28. After a 38–21 victory over Tulane, the Tigers lost their remaining five games, suffering defeats to Southern Miss in the Black and Blue Bowl by a margin of 14–7, Alabama by a score of 28–9, Virginia Tech by a margin of 31–10, No. 19 Tennessee by a score of 17–7 and Army by a score of 49–7 . After refusing to resign, Dempsey was fired as head coach after the 1985 season. Dempsey left the Tigers with a record of 7–12–3 in two seasons as head coach.

=== Charlie Bailey era (1986–1988) ===
Florida defensive coordinator Charlie Bailey was hired as the 18th head football coach at Memphis State after Dempsey's firing. Despite having no head coaching experience, Bailey arrived in Memphis with a great reputation as a defensive mind with over twenty years of assistant coaching experience, serving under the likes of Fran Curci at Miami and Kentucky, Al Conover at Rice and Foge Fazio at Pittsburgh before joining Galen Hall's Florida staff.

Memphis State went 1–10 in 1986. They started the season with a 28–6 loss to Ole Miss on September 6. The next week, the Tigers lost to Arkansas State in the Paint Bucket Bowl by a score of 30–10. Louisiana-Lafayette defeated the Tigers by a score of 26–10 on September 20. Memphis' tough season continued the next week against Louisville, losing to the Cardinals by a score of 34–8. After a 34–17 loss to Mississippi State, Bailey's team was shut out by No. 2 Alabama by a score of 37–0. On October 18, the Tigers lost a close 14–9 contest to rival Southern Miss. Memphis State won its first game of the season on November 1 with a 22–21 victory over Vanderbilt. The Tigers lost their last three games of the season, falling to Tennessee by a margin of 33–3, Tulane by a margin of 15–6 and New Mexico by a margin of 20–13.

The Tigers improved to 5–5–1 in 1987. In the season opener, Bailey's squad defeated Ole Miss by a score of 16–10. Memphis State lost their next three, dropping contests to Vanderbilt by a margin of 27–17, No. 7 Florida State by a score of 41–24 and Mississippi State in a 9–6 defensive struggle. On October 10, Memphis State pulled off one of the biggest wins in program history, defeating No. 15 Alabama by a score of 13–10. The next week, the Tigers defeated Tulane by a margin of 45–36. After a nail biting 17–14 defeat at the hands of Southern Miss, Memphis State tied Arkansas State at 21–21. After a 31–7 loss to Louisiana-Lafayette, Memphis State won its last two games of the season, crushing Louisville by a score of 43–8 and shutting out Tulsa by a score of 14–0.

Bailey's Tigers finished 6–5 in 1988. They started the season on September 3 with a 24–6 loss to Ole Miss. After a 9–7 victory over Arkansas State, the Tigers lost their next two, suffering a 29–18 defeat to Louisville and a 20–19 nail biter to Tulane. Memphis State then defeated Southeastern Conference opponents in the next two weeks, topping Mississippi State by a margin of 31–10 and No. 14 Florida by a margin of 17–11. After a 38–25 loss to Tennessee and a 34–27 loss to Southern Miss, the Tigers won their last three games of the season, defeating Louisiana-Lafayette by a score of 20–3, Tulsa by a margin of 26–20 and Vanderbilt by a margin of 28–9. Bailey resigned as Memphis State head coach in May 1989 after allegations that two of his athletes lied about contacts with school boosters. He put together a 12–20–1 record in three seasons.

=== Chuck Stobart era (1989–1994) ===
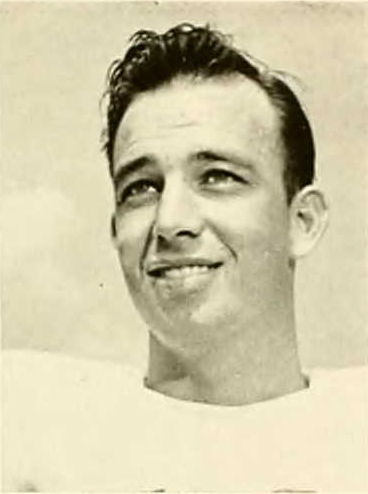
Coach Stobart

On June 26, 1989, USC offensive coordinator Chuck Stobart was named the 19th head coach of the Memphis State Tigers. An assistant coach under Bo Schembechler at Miami (OH) and Michigan, Stobart served as head coach at Toledo from 1977 to 1981 and Utah from 1982 to 1984, achieving mediocre success. After leaving the Utes, Stobart served as offensive coordinator at Pittsburgh in 1985 under Foge Fazio and at Arizona under Larry Smith in 1986 before following Smith to USC. Stobart signed a four-year contract with Memphis State worth a base salary of $100,000 annually.

Memphis State finished 2–9 in 1989. After a 20–13 loss to Ole Miss, the Tigers lost the Paint Bucket Bowl to Arkansas State by a margin of 17–13. Next came a 35–7 loss to No. 16 Alabama and a 38–13 loss to Florida. On October 7, Stobart's team got their first win of the season with a 13–10 victory over in-state opponent Vanderbilt. The next week, the Tigers picked up their second win of the campaign, defeating Cincinnati by a score of 34–17. On October 21, Memphis State lost to Mississippi State by a margin of 35–10. That was followed by a 31–7 loss to Southern Miss in the Black and Blue Bowl. After a 38–34 loss to Tulane, the Tigers lost to Louisville by 40–10. Memphis State closed the season on November 18 with another loss, a 57–20 blowout at the hands of No. 5 Florida State. After the 1989 season, Stobart fired six of his nine assistant coaches, including both coordinators.

The Tigers went 4–6–1 in 1990. Memphis State's football season began on September 1 with a 24–24 tie in the Paint Bucket Bowl with Arkansas State behind running back (and future Tigers head coach) Larry Porter's 206 rushing yards and three rushing touchdowns. After a tough 23–21 nail biting defeat to rival Ole Miss, the Tigers embarked upon a three-game winning streak, beginning with a 37–28 win over UCF. On September 29, Stobart's Tigers defeated Tulsa by a margin of 22–10. The next week, Memphis State defeated Tulane by a count of 21–14. On October 13, the Tigers lost a close 19–17 contest to Louisville. That was followed by a 23–7 loss in the annual Black and Blue Bowl to Southern Miss. After a 20–6 victory over Louisiana-Lafayette, Stobart's squad lost its last three, falling to East Carolina by a score of 24–17, Mississippi State by a count of 27–23 and No. 9 Florida State in a 35–3 blowout.

Stobart led the Tigers to a 5–6 record in 1991. Memphis State started the season by upsetting No. 16 USC by a score of 24–10. The following week, Stobart's Tigers lost to rival Ole Miss by a score of 10–0. On September 14, Memphis State lost to East Carolina by a count of 20–13. The Tigers got their second win of the season the following week with a 31–21 win over Arkansas State. After a 31–21 loss to Missouri, the Tigers won two consecutive games, defeating Southern Miss 17–12 and Mississippi State 28–23. On October 26, Memphis State lost to Tulsa by a count of 33–28. The next week, Memphis State lost to No. 14 Tennessee by a margin of 52–24. After a 35–7 thrashing of Louisville, the Tigers finished the season with a 10–7 loss to No. 7 Alabama.

Memphis State went 6–5 in 1992. They began the season on September 5, losing the Black and Blue Bowl to Southern Miss by a score of 23–21. Another close loss came the following week in the form of a 16–15 loss to Louisville. In the season's third game, the Tigers dropped another nail biter, falling to No. 24 Mississippi State by a margin of 20–16. After the season's third game, 80 Tigers football players boycotted team practice, claiming they had lost respect for Coach Stobart for the way he handled the team. However, after Stobart acknowledged the players' frustrations and promised to change his approach, the players returned after sitting out only one day. On September 26, Memphis State won their first game of the season, defeating Arkansas by a margin of 22–6. The Tigers defeated Cincinnati by a score of 34–14 and followed that with a 37–7 victory over rival Arkansas State. On October 24, Memphis State defeated Tulsa by a margin of 30–25. The team's winning streak was extended to five with a 62–20 shellacking of Tulane on Halloween. Ole Miss snapped Memphis State's winning streak on November 7 with a 17–12 victory over the Tigers. That was followed by a 26–21 loss to No. 23 Tennessee on November 14. They finished the season with a 42–7 drubbing of East Carolina on November 21.

The Tigers finished with another 6–5 record in 1993. They opened the season with a 45–35 victory over No. 23 Mississippi State on September 4. In the season's second game, Stobart's team got crushed by Louisville to the tune of 54–28. The Tigers lost a closer 17–15 contest to Louisiana-Lafayette in their third game of the season. The Tigers then notched their first win of the season, shutting out Arkansas by a margin of 6–0. That was followed by a 34–7 thrashing of East Carolina and a 45–3 drubbing of rival Arkansas State. Stobart's squad lost to Tulsa by a score of 23–19 and Cincinnati by a count of 23–20 over the next two weeks. The Tigers then defeated Ole Miss by a score of 19–3 and Southern Miss by a margin of 20–9. In the season's last game, the Tigers lost to No. 9 Miami by a margin of 41–17. Star wide receiver Isaac Bruce, a senior in 1993, finished his Memphis State career with 113 receptions for 1,586 yards (14.0 yards per rec. avg.) and 15 touchdowns. He was selected in the second round with the 33rd overall pick in the 1994 NFL draft by the Los Angeles Rams.

Memphis State University changed its name to the University of Memphis in 1994. That year, the Tigers finished 6–5 for the third consecutive year. On September 3, Stobart's squad lost to Mississippi State by a margin of 17–6. Memphis won its first game of the season the following week with a 42–18 thrashing of Tulsa. After a 20–3 loss to Southern Miss, Memphis won their next four games, topping Arkansas in a 16–15 nail biter, Tulane in a 13–0 shutout, Arkansas State by a margin of 15–6 and Cincinnati in a 26–3 blowout. On October 29, Memphis lost to Louisville by a score of 10–6. That was followed by a 17–16 win over Ole Miss. In the season's final two games, the Tigers lost to Tennessee by a margin of 24–13 and East Carolina by a count of 30–6. On January 13, 1995, Stobart was fired as head coach of the Tigers. His Tigers compiled a 29–36–1 record in his five seasons.

=== Rip Scherer era (1995–2000) ===
James Madison head coach Rip Scherer took over as the Tigers' 20th head football coach after Stobart's termination. Scherer arrived in the Mid-South with some impressive credentials, serving as offensive coordinator at Georgia Tech from 1980 to 1986 under Bill Curry and then following Curry to Alabama, serving as the Crimson Tide's offensive coordinator in 1987. He then joined Dick Tomey's Arizona staff, serving as offensive coordinator from 1988 to 1990 before taking over as James Madison's head coach. Scherer signed a five-year contract worth a base salary of $110,000 annually.

On April 24, 1995, the University of Memphis ended its 21-year run as an independent when joined the newly formed Conference USA with several other southern universities. The league announced it would begin football competition in 1996.

The Tigers finished 3–8 in 1995. They kicked off the season on September 2 with a 28–18 loss to Mississippi State. After a 24–7 loss to No. 11 Michigan, Memphis picked up its first win of the season with a 33–19 victory over Louisiana-Lafayette. The next week, Scherer's team lost to Arkansas by a score of 27–20. On September 30, the Tigers lost to Louisville by a margin of 17–7. After a 23–8 victory over Tulane, Memphis lost to Cincinnati by a score of 28–3. After a 10–7 win over Tulsa, the Tigers lost 34–3 to Ole Miss. After a 17–9 loss to Southern Miss in the Black and Blue Bowl, Scherer's squad finished the season with a 31–17 defeat by East Carolina.

Memphis went 4–7 in 1996, its first season in Conference USA. In the season opener, the Tigers suffered a 30–7 loss to No. 11 Miami. The following week, they suffered a 31–10 loss to Mississippi State. Scherer then led the Tigers to three straight wins, defeating Missouri by a score of 19–16, Tulane by a margin of 17–10 and Cincinnati by a score of 18–16. On October 12, the Tigers lost to Houston by a margin of 37–20. That was followed by a 16–0 shutout loss to Southern Miss. On October 26, Scherer's Tigers suffered a 13–9 loss at the hands of Louisiana-Lafayette. Another loss followed in the form of a 13–10 defeat at the hands of Louisville on November 2. Then, the Tigers notched one of the biggest wins in program history. On November 9, 1996, the Tigers beat SEC power No. 6 Tennessee, quarterbacked by Peyton Manning, 21–17 at Liberty Bowl Memorial Stadium. It was the first time Memphis had defeated the Vols in fifteen meetings, and the Vols came into the game with a 40–1 record in November since 1985. Fans stormed the field and tore down the goalposts after the huge upset win. During the game, Memphis kick returner Kevin Cobb returned a kickoff for a touchdown. The touchdown won an ESPY for "College Football Play of the Year" in June 1997. It would take another 19 years for the Tigers to defeat another nationally ranked team, when they defeated No. 13 Ole Miss by a margin of 37–24 in 2015. Scherer's Tigers lost by a score of 20–10 to East Carolina in the season's final game.

Memphis posted a second consecutive 4–7 record in 1997. After dropping the season opener by a score of 13–10 to Mississippi State, the Tigers got their first win of the season in their second game, defeating UAB by a score of 28–7. Scherer's team then embarked upon a three-game losing streak, beginning with a 51–21 loss to No. 21 Michigan State on September 13. Next, Memphis lost to Minnesota by a score of 20–17. On October 4, Memphis lost to Cincinnati by second straight 20–17 score. After a 38–9 shellacking of Arkansas State, Scherer's squad lost by a score of 32–10 to East Carolina. After a 24–3 victory over Houston, Memphis lost to Tulane by a score of 26–14. On November 15, the Tigers lost a 21–20 nail biter to Louisville. They concluded the season on November 22 with a 42–18 defeat in the Black and Blue Bowl to Southern Miss.

The Tigers went 2–9 in 1998. They started the season with a 30–10 loss to Ole Miss. The Tigers faced the other Southeastern Conference team from Mississippi in the season's second game, falling to the Bulldogs by a margin of 14–6. On September 19, Scherer's team lost to Minnesota by a margin of 41–14. The next week, Memphis lost to Houston by a count of 35–14. After a 23–9 defeat at the hands of No. 20 Arkansas, the Tigers defeated Cincinnati by a count of 41–23 to record their first win of the season. After a 35–32 loss to Louisville, Memphis picked up its second win of the year by beating Arkansas State in the Paint Bucket Bowl by a margin of 35–19 After a 41–31 loss to No. 15 Tulane on November 7, Scherer's squad lost to Southern Miss by a blowout margin of 45–3. They closed the season with a 34–31 loss to East Carolina.

Scherer led the Tigers to a 5–6 mark in 1999. In their first game, Memphis lost a defensive struggle to Ole Miss by a count of 3–0. The next week, the Tigers again lost by three points, falling to Mississippi State by a margin of 13–10. On September 18, Memphis won the Paint Bucket Bowl, defeating Arkansas State by a score of 31–26. The Tigers then lost a 17–16 contest to No. 7 Tennessee on September 25. That was followed by a 27–17 loss to Missouri. After a 38–14 victory over UAB, Memphis suffered another defeat, a 32–31 nail biter to Louisville. After a 49–7 blowout of Tulane, Scherer's team lost to No. 25 Southern Miss by a score of 20–5. The Tigers finished the season with two wins, defeating Army by a score of 14–10 and Cincinnati by a score of 21–13.

Memphis finished 4–7 in 2000. The Tigers lost to Mississippi State by a margin of 17–3 in the season opener on September 2. Scherer then led his team to three straight wins, beginning with a 28–0 shutout over Louisiana-Monroe. The next week, the Tigers won the Paint Bucket Bowl over Arkansas State by a score of 19–17. That was followed by a 26–16 victory over Army on September 23. After a 24–3 loss to No. 21 Southern Miss in the Black and Blue Bowl, Memphis defeated East Carolina by a score of 17–10. On October 14, Memphis lost to UAB by a count of 13–9. The next week, Memphis lost to Houston by a margin of 33–30 in triple overtime. On November 4, the Tigers lost to in-state foe Tennessee by a margin of 19–17. After a 13–10 overtime loss to Cincinnati, the Tigers lost to Tulane by a margin of 37–14 in the season's final game. Scherer was fired as head coach after the 2000 season. He left Memphis with a 22–44 record in six seasons as head coach.

=== Tommy West era (2001–2009) ===
On November 30, 2000, it was announced that Tommy West had been promoted from defensive coordinator to head football coach of the Tigers, the 21st in program history. A tight end at Tennessee from 1972 to 1975 under Bill Battle, West had over twenty years of college football coaching experience at the time he became head coach of the Tigers. He also had prior head coaching experience, serving as the head coach at Clemson from 1993 to 1998 and at FCS program Chattanooga in 1993. West joined Rip Scherer's Memphis staff as defensive coordinator on January 6, 2000. West signed a five-year contract paying him a base salary of $139,725 annually plus room for incentive bonuses.

Memphis went 5–6 in 2001. In the season's first game, the Tigers lost to No. 18 Mississippi State by a margin of 30–10. After picking up their first win of the season with a 43–10 shellacking of I-AA opponent Chattanooga, West's team picked up its second win of the season with a 17–9 victory over South Florida. After a 38–21 loss to Louisville, Memphis won their next two, defeating Southern Miss by a score of 22–17 and Houston by a one-sided score of 52–33. On October 20, the Tigers lost to East Carolina by a margin of 32–11. That was followed by a second consecutive loss in the form of a 17–14 nail biter at the hands of UAB. On November 10, the Tigers lost a third straight game, falling to No. 6 Tennessee by a score of 49–28. The following week, West's squad broke its losing streak with a 42–10 pounding of Army. On November 24, Memphis closed the season with a last-second 36–34 loss to Cincinnati.

The Tigers finished with a 3–9 record in 2002. The season began on August 31 with a 52–6 pounding of I-AA opponent Murray State. One week later, Memphis lost to Ole Miss by a score of 38–16. In the season's third game, the Tigers lost the Black and Blue Bowl to Southern Miss by a margin of 33–14. After a 38–10 victory over Tulane, West's team lost their next six, beginning with a 31–17 loss to UAB. On October 8, Memphis lost to Louisville by a score of 38–32. On October 19, the Tigers lost to Mississippi State by a margin of 29–17. One week later, Cincinnati defeated Memphis by a margin of 48–10. On November 2, Houston defeated West's Tigers by a score of 26–21. After a 38–21 loss to South Florida, Memphis notched its third win of the season with a 38–10 win over Army. On November 30, the Tigers lost to TCU by a score of 27–20 to finish the season.

Memphis improved to 9–4 in 2003. In the season opener, the Tigers defeated in-state I-AA foe Tennessee Tech by a score of 40–10. In the season's second game, Memphis upset Ole Miss by a count of 44–34. After a 23–6 loss to Southern Miss, Memphis defeated Arkansas State by a count of 38–16. They then lost their next two, falling to UAB by a margin of 24–10 and Mississippi State by a score of 35–27. Memphis rebounded to win their next five, starting with a 45–14 victory over Houston. That was followed by a 41–9 win over Tulane. On November 1, the Tigers defeated East Carolina by a margin of 41–24. In the season's tenth game, West's team defeated Louisville by a score of 37–7. One week later, the Tigers defeated Cincinnati by a score of 21–16. In the regular season finale, the Tigers lost a 21–16 game to South Florida. Memphis accepted a berth in the 2003 New Orleans Bowl, a game they won over North Texas by a score of 27–17. The victory was Memphis' first bowl appearance in a bowl game and first bowl victory in 32 years, since the 1971 Pasadena Bowl.

The Tigers finished with an 8–4 record in 2004. They defeated Ole Miss by a margin of 20–13 in the season opener. The next week, West's squad won its second game with a 52–21 rout of I-AA foe Chattanooga. Entering their next contest as the No. 25 team in the country, they followed that with a third straight win: a 47–35 trouncing of Arkansas State. After a 35–28 loss to UAB, the Tigers defeated Houston 41–14 and Tulane 49–24. After a 49–10 blowout loss to Cincinnati and a 56–49 loss to No. 14 Louisville, Memphis won a 30–26 contest over Southern Miss, a 38–35 game over East Carolina and a 31–15 contest over South Florida. The Tigers received a berth in the 2004 GMAC Bowl, a contest they lost to Bowling Green by a margin of 52–35. After leading the Tigers to consecutive bowl appearances for the first time in program history, the University of Memphis administration signed West to a raise and one-year contract extension.

Memphis finished 7–5 in 2005. They started the season on September 5 with a 10–6 loss to Ole Miss. After a 59–14 thrashing of I-AA Chattanooga, Memphis lost its third game of the season to Tulsa by a margin of 37–31 in overtime. The Tigers defeated UTEP by a score of 27–20 in the season's fourth game. After a 38–17 defeat at the hands of UCF, West's team beat Houston 35–20 and East Carolina 27–24. After a 37–20 loss to UAB and a 20–16 loss to Tennessee, West's squad defeated Southern Miss by a margin of 24–22 and Marshall by a score of 26–3 to finish the regular season. Memphis made its third straight bowl appearance with its berth in the 2005 Motor City Bowl, defeating Akron by a score of 38–31. During that game, star Tigers running back DeAngelo Williams set an NCAA record with his 34th career game of at least 100 rushing yards. Williams, a senior in 2005 and a finalist for the Doak Walker Award that year, was selected in the first round with the 27th overall pick in the 2006 NFL draft by the Carolina Panthers. Kicker Stephen Gostkowski was also selected in that year's draft, going in the fourth round with the 118th overall pick to the New England Patriots.

The Tigers struggled to a 2–10 record in 2006. They began the season on September 3, losing to Ole Miss by a margin of 28–25. After a 33–14 win over I-AA Chattanooga, Memphis lost nine straight, beginning with a 35–20 defeat to East Carolina. After the East Carolina loss, West fired defensive coordinator Joe Lee Dunn. On September 30, West's team lost to No. 15 Tennessee by a margin of 41–7. The next week, the Tigers lost to UAB by a score of 35–29. After a 26–23 Paint Bucket Bowl loss to Arkansas State, Memphis lost to Tulsa by a margin of 35–14. On October 28, the Tigers lost to Marshall by a score of 41–27. Southern Miss then doubled up the Tigers by a score of 42–21. After a 26–24 loss to UCF, Memphis suffered a 23–20 overtime loss to Houston. The Tigers ended their long losing streak by picking up their second win of the season in the last game with a 38–19 victory over UTEP.

Memphis finished 7–6 in 2007. After dropping the opener to Ole Miss by a margin of 23–21, West's squad defeated I-AA opponent Jacksonville State by a margin of 35–14 to record their first win of the season. After losing to UCF by a margin of 56–20 and Arkansas State by a score of 35–31 after blowing a 25-point halftime lead, Memphis defeated Marshall by a score of 24–21. After a 21–7 loss to in-state foe Middle Tennessee, Memphis beat Rice by a score of 38–35 and Tulane by a slim margin of 28–27. After a 56–40 loss to East Carolina, West's team won three straight, defeating Southern Miss by a margin of 29–26, UAB by a count of 25–9 and SMU in a triple-overtime 55–52 shootout. The Tigers made their fourth bowl appearance in five years in the 2007 New Orleans Bowl, losing to Florida Atlantic by a score of 44–27.

The Tigers went 6–7 in 2008. They lost their first three games of the season, falling to Ole Miss by a margin of 41–24, Rice by a score of 42–35 and Marshall in a 17–16 nail biter. West's Tigers won their next three, defeating I-AA Nicholls State by a margin of 31–10, Arkansas State by a score of 29–17 and UAB in a 33–30 nail biter. After a 35–28 loss to Louisville and a 30–10 loss to East Carolina, Memphis defeated Southern Miss by a count of 36–30 and SMU by a count of 31–26. After a 28–21 loss to UCF, Memphis finished the regular season with a 45–6 thrashing of Tulane. The Tigers made their fifth bowl appearance in six years in the 2008 St. Petersburg Bowl, losing to South Florida in a 41–14 rout.

Memphis regressed to a 2–10 record in 2009. They were trounced by No. 8 Ole Miss in the season opener, losing 45–14. After a 31–14 loss to Middle Tennessee, West's squad earned its first win of the season with a 41–14 win over in-state FCS opponent UT Martin. After a 27–16 loss to Marshall and a 32–14 defeat at the hands of UCF, the Tigers defeated UTEP by a score of 35–20. Memphis lost its final six games of the season, beginning with a 36–16 defeat to Southern Miss on October 17. On October 27, West's team lost to East Carolina by a count of 38–19. On November 7, the Tigers lost to in-state foe Tennessee by a score of 56–28.

On November 10, 2009, it was announced that Tommy West would be fired as Memphis head coach after the completion of the 2009 season. At the press conference announcing his firing, West vented his frustration about lack of financial and fan support and said that if the University of Memphis athletics department did not show more commitment to the football program, the program did not have "a fighting chance". On November 14, the Tigers lost to UAB by a margin of 31–21. That was followed by a 55–14 thrashing at the hands of No. 24 Houston. In the last game of the season, Memphis lost a nail biter to Tulsa by a score of 33–30 in overtime. West left Memphis with a 49–61 record.

=== Larry Porter era (2010–2011) ===
On November 29, 2009, LSU running backs coach Larry Porter was named the 22nd head football coach for the University of Memphis football program. Although he had no head coaching or coordinating experience, Porter was a well-regarded recruiter and running backs coach who had played running back for the Tigers from 1990 to 1993 under Chuck Stobart. Porter's hiring made him the first African-American head coach in the history of Memphis football. Porter signed a five-year contract worth a base salary of $750,000 annually. The Tigers struggled tremendously under Porter as fan support, attendance and revenue fell.

The Tigers went 1–11 in 2010. They kicked off the Porter era on September 4 against Mississippi State, losing to the Bulldogs by a score of 49–7. After losing to East Carolina by a margin of 49–27, the Tigers notched their first win of the Porter era, defeating in-state opponent Middle Tennessee by a score of 24–17. The next week, Memphis lost to UTEP by a score of 16–13. That was followed by a 48–7 blowout loss to Tulsa on October 2. After a 56–0 shutout defeat at the hands of Louisville, the Tigers suffered a 41–19 defeat in the Black and Blue Bowl to Southern Miss. On October 30, Porter's team lost to Houston by a margin of 56–17. The following week, Memphis suffered another blowout in the form of a 50–14 shellacking by in-state foe Tennessee. The Tigers lost to Marshall by a score of 28–13 on November 13. The Tigers suffered a 31–15 loss to UAB and a 37–17 defeat at the hands of UCF to close the season.

Memphis finished 2–10 in 2011. The Tigers started the season with two blowout losses, 59–14 to No. 20 Mississippi State and 47–3 to Arkansas State. The Tigers won their third game of the season, defeating FCS in-state opponent Austin Peay by a score of 27–6. After a 42–0 shutout loss to SMU, the Tigers lost to Middle Tennessee by a margin of 38–31. On October 8, Porter's team lost to Rice by a score of 28–6. The next week, Memphis lost to East Carolina by a count of 35–17. Porter's Tigers got their second win of the season on October 22 with a 33–17 victory over Tulane, their foes from down the Mississippi River. After a 41–0 shutout shellacking to UCF, the Tigers lost a closer contest to UAB by a score of 41–35. After a 23–22 loss to Marshall, Memphis closed the season with a 44–7 crushing to Southern Miss.

On November 27, 2011, Porter was fired as Tigers head coach after only having won three games during his two-year tenure. For his buyout, Memphis owed Porter a total of $754,890 annually for the remaining four years of his contract. Porter's tenure as Memphis head coach is regarded as one of the worst head coaching tenures in the history of college football. During Larry Porter's two years, Memphis finished at or near the bottom of the FBS in nearly every offensive and defensive statistical category. Porter amassed a 3–21 record as head coach of the Tigers.

=== Justin Fuente era (2012–2015) ===
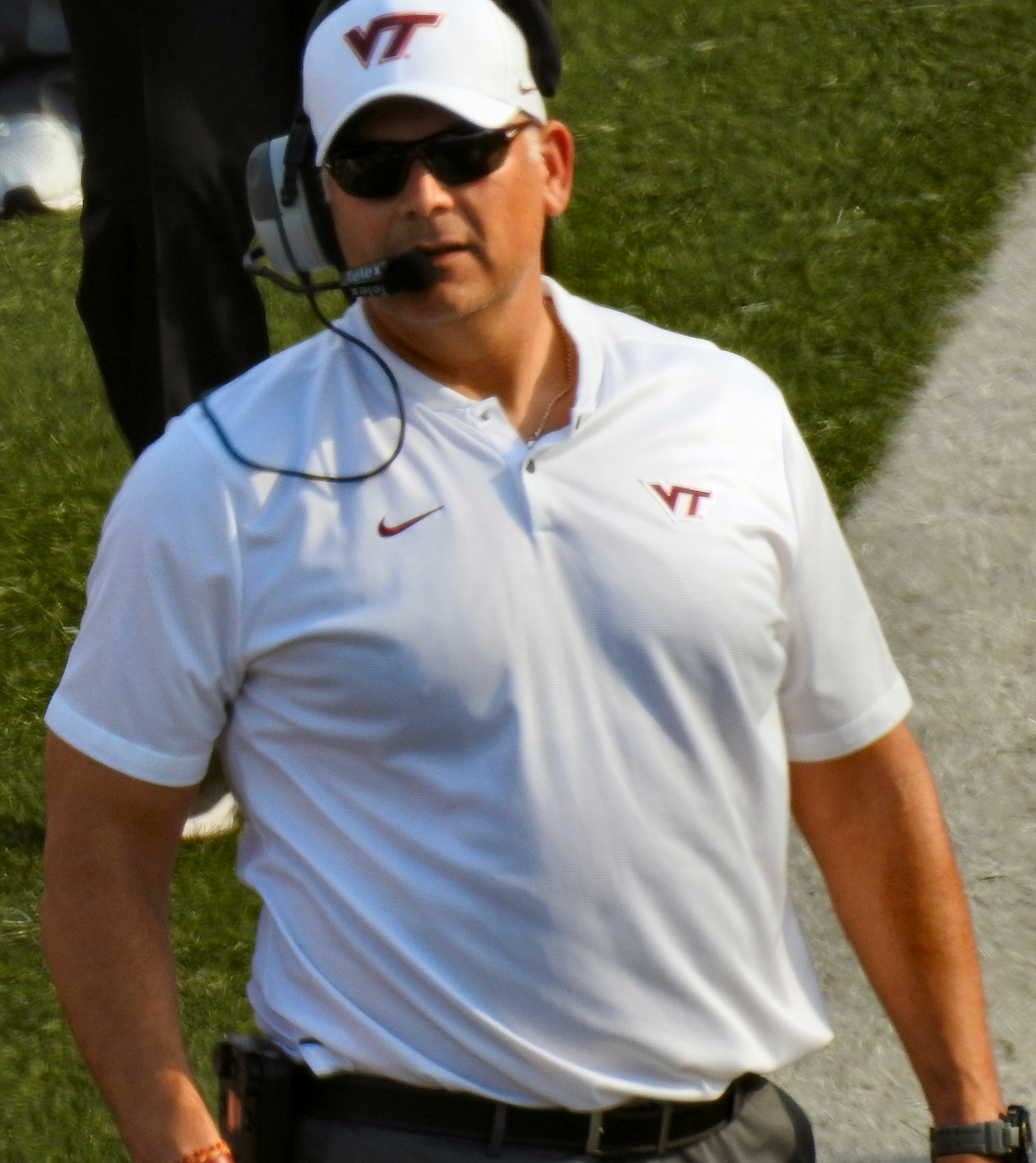
Coach Fuente

On December 8, 2011, TCU offensive coordinator Justin Fuente was formally introduced as the Tigers' 23rd head coach. The 35-year old Fuente, who had no prior head coaching experience, had spent the previous five years at TCU as an assistant, including serving as offensive coordinator for the final three years under Gary Patterson. During his time as offensive coordinator for the Horned Frogs, Fuente oversaw a spread offense that was among the nation's most explosive, helped TCU to an appearance in the 2010 Fiesta Bowl and a victory in the 2011 Rose Bowl and coached one of the nation's best quarterbacks in Andy Dalton. Fuente signed a five-year contract with the University of Memphis that paid him a base salary of $900,000 annually.

On February 8, 2012, it was announced the University of Memphis would end its 17-year run in Conference USA and join the Big East Conference in all sports, effective July 1, 2013. On July 1, 2013, the non-football playing schools (also known collectively as the secular Catholic 7) formed a non-football playing conference that retains the Big East Conference name. The remaining six football-playing members joined with four schools from other conferences to become the American Athletic Conference (AAC) as the legal successor of the original Big East; the AAC retains the Big East's football structure and inherited its single automatic berth in the Bowl Championship Series.

The Tigers finished 4–8 in 2012. They began the season on September 1 with a 20–17 loss to FCS in-state opponent UT Martin. In the season's second game, Memphis lost the Paint Bucket Bowl to Arkansas State by a margin of 33–28. On September 15, Fuente's Tigers lost to in-state foe Middle Tennessee by a margin of 48–30. After a 38–14 loss to Duke, the Tiger recorded their first win under Fuente, defeating Rice by a score of 14–10. On October 13, Memphis lost to East Carolina by a margin of 41–7. The following week, UCF defeated Fuente's squad by a score of 35–17. On October 27, the Tigers lost to SMU by a score of 44–13. After a 38–28 defeat at the hands of Marshall, Memphis recorded its second win of the season with a 37–23 victory over Tulane. The Tigers got a second consecutive win the following week in the form of a 46–9 shellacking of UAB. The Tigers extended their winning streak to three in the season's final game with a 42–24 win in the Black and Blue Bowl over winless rival Southern Miss. On February 13, 2013, Memphis announced it had signed Justin Fuente to a one-year contract extension through the 2017 season as a result of improvement shown by the team in his first year as head coach, as evidenced by the team winning more games in 2012 than in the previous two seasons combined.

Memphis finished with a 3–9 record in 2013, their first season as members of the American Athletic Conference. The Tigers kicked off the season at home against Duke, losing to the Blue Devils by a margin of 28–14. The next week, they lost to Middle Tennessee by a score of 17–15. Fuente's team got its first win in the season's third game by defeating Arkansas State by a score of 31–7. On October 12, the Tigers lost to Houston by a score of 25–15. The next week, Fuente's squad lost to SMU by a margin of 34–29. After a 34–21 loss to Cincinnati, the Tigers defeated SMU by a score of 21–6. They won a second consecutive game the following week by defeating South Florida by a margin of 23–10. Kicker Jake Elliott set a Memphis record for his 56-yard field goal on the road at USF. This new Tigers record broke the old school record set by Stephen Gostkowski who hit a 53-yard field goal 2005. He also was recognized by including being named the American Athletic Conference Special Teams Player of the Week and also one of three players to be named "Stars of the Week" by Lou Groza Award. On November 23, the Tigers lost a close 24–17 game to No. 21 Louisville. That was followed by a 41–21 loss to Temple. In the final game of the season, Memphis got blown out by UConn by a score of 45–10.

The Tigers improved to a 10–3 record in 2014. In the season's first game, the Tigers crushed in-state FCS opponent Austin Peay by a whopping 63–0. After a 42–35 loss to No. 11 UCLA, Fuente's squad handled Middle Tennessee by a margin of 36–17. After a 24–3 loss to Ole Miss, Memphis defeated Cincinnati by a margin of 41–14. After a nail biting 28–24 loss to Houston, the Tigers won their final seven games of the season, beginning with a 48–10 pounding of SMU. On Halloween, the Tigers doubled by Tulsa to the tune of 40–20. The next week, Fuente led the Tigers to a close 16–13 victory over Temple. That was followed by a 38–7 thrashing of Tulane on November 15. One week later, Memphis defeated South Florida by a margin of 31–20. The Tigers closed the regular season with a 41–10 rout over UConn. Fuente's Tigers accepted a berth in the inaugural 2014 Miami Beach Bowl, where they defeated BYU in a 55–48 overtime thriller. Memphis finished the season as co-champions of the AAC. This was the first football conference championship for the Memphis Tigers since the 1971 Missouri Valley Conference championship and only their second 10-win season since 1938. The Tigers finished the season ranked No. 25 in both the AP and the Coaches Polls. Fuente was named a finalist for the Eddie Robinson Coach of the Year award. During his sophomore year, Jake Elliott led the American Athletic Conference in per game scoring, averaging 9.2 points throughout his season. For a consecutive year, he was named First Team All-Conference as well as being named Conference Special Teams Player of the Year. He scored 120 points during his season, making 21-of-32 field goal attempts while also converting all 57 extra point conversions. Elliott kicked the fourth longest field goal in bowl game history. The kick was a 54-yard attempt, which extended the Tigers into a second overtime where they won the Miami Beach Bowl in double overtime over BYU by a score of 55–48. On December 18, 2014, it was announced that the University of Memphis administration signed Justin Fuente to another contract extension and raise, increasing his annual pay to $1.4 million.

Memphis went 9–4 in 2015. The Tigers' season kicked off on September 5 with a 63–7 romp over FCS opponent Missouri State. One week later, the Tigers dominated Kansas with 651 yards of total offense in a 55–23 rout. In the season's third game, Fuente's team edged Bowling Green by a margin of 44–41. That was followed by a 53–46 victory over Cincinnati on September 24. In the season's fifth game, Memphis defeated South Florida by a score of 24–17 to extend their winning streak to twelve games dating back to the previous season. On October 17, 2015, Memphis, led by quarterback Paxton Lynch, upset No. 13 Ole Miss 37–24 at the Liberty Bowl, catapulting the team into the national spotlight. The victory was the Tigers' first over a ranked team since 1996, when they defeated No. 6 Tennessee. The 6–0 Tigers entered the AP Poll the following day at No. 18 having been ranked in the Coaches Poll for the previous two weeks, the highest AP Poll ranking in Memphis football history. On October 23, the Tigers defeated Tulsa by a score of 66–42 behind Paxton Lynch's career-high 447 passing yards and four touchdown passes. On Halloween, the Tigers winning streak was extended to fifteen with a 41–13 victory over Tulane. On November 3, 2015, an undefeated (8–0) Memphis team was ranked No. 13 in the season's first College Football Playoff poll, the highest ranking of any non-Power Five team in the poll's history and the highest national ranking in Memphis football history. The Tigers' unprecedented winning streak was snapped, however, with a 45–20 loss to Navy on November 7. Memphis suffered a second consecutive loss the following week in a 35–34 defeat to No. 16 Houston. On November 20, 2015, it was reported that the University of Memphis offered another contract extension to Fuente that would've made him the highest paid non-Power Five head coach in the country. On November 21, Fuente's team lost a third straight game, falling to Temple by a margin of 31–12. The Tigers got back on track in the season's final game on November 28, demolishing SMU in a 63–0 shutout behind Paxton Lynch's record-tying seven touchdown passes in the game's first half.

On November 29, 2015, Justin Fuente resigned as Memphis head coach to accept the same position at Virginia Tech. Offensive coordinator Darrell Dickey was named interim head coach for the 2015 Birmingham Bowl, a game the Tigers lost to Auburn by a score of 31–10. In April 2016, Paxton Lynch was selected by the Denver Broncos in the first round of the 2016 NFL draft with the 26th overall selection. Fuente left Memphis with a 26–23 record, becoming the first head coach in 41 years, since Fred Pancoast, to leave Memphis with a winning record.

=== Mike Norvell era (2016–2019) ===
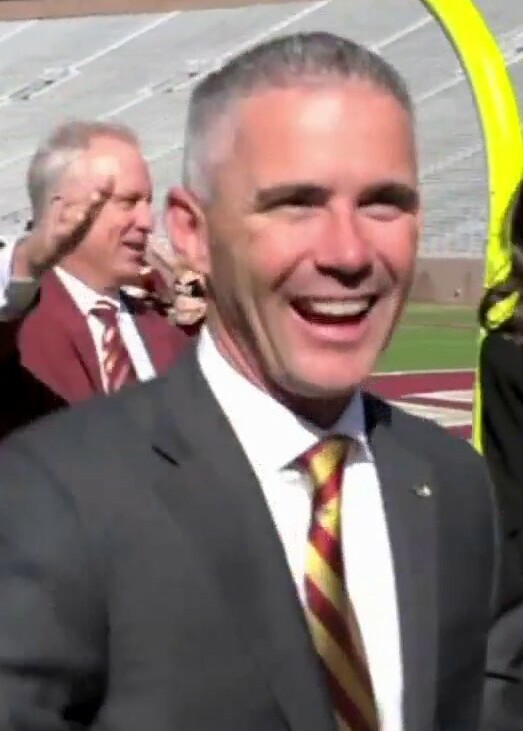
Coach Norvell

On December 4, 2015, Arizona State offensive coordinator Mike Norvell was introduced as the 24th head football coach of the Memphis Tigers. The youngest FBS head coach in the nation at the time of his hiring (aged 34), Norvell had overseen one of the nation's most explosive offenses at Arizona State under Todd Graham. Like Justin Fuente, Norvell was a young, up-and-coming offensive coordinator who employed an up-tempo, pass-oriented spread offense and brought the high-octane system with him to Memphis. One of Norvell's first moves as head coach was to retain Darrell Dickey from Fuente's staff, naming him associate head coach/co-offensive coordinator and running backs coach. The University of Memphis signed Norvell to a five-year contract that paid him a base salary of $1.8 million for his first year that would increase slightly each year for the duration of the contract.

The Tigers finished with an 8–5 record in 2016. With Riley Ferguson taking over as the team's starting quarterback, Memphis began the Norvell era with a 35–17 victory over FCS opponent Southeast Missouri State on September 3. The next week, Norvell's team defeated Kansas by a margin of 43–7. In the season's third game, the Tigers obliterated Bowling Green by a whopping 77–3 behind Ferguson's six passing touchdowns and one rushing touchdown in the game's first half. On October 1, Ole Miss handed Memphis its first loss of the season in a 48–28 rout. Five days later, the Tigers defeated Temple by a score of 34–27. That was followed by a 24–14 victory over Tulane on October 14. Memphis lost its next two; dropping a 42–28 contest to #24 Navy and a 59–30 blowout to Tulsa. On November 5, the Tigers pounded SMU by an overwhelming 51–7. The next week, Norvell's Tigers lost a shootout to South Florida by a margin of 49–42. They closed the regular season with a 34–27 win over Cincinnati on November 18 and a 48–44 victory over #18 Houston in a shootout. The Tigers accepted a berth in the 2016 Boca Raton Bowl, a game they lost to Western Kentucky by a score of 51–31. In 13 starts in 2016, Riley Ferguson threw for 3,698 yards and broke Paxton Lynch's single-season record with 32 touchdown passes set the previous season. After the 2016 season, co-offensive coordinator Chip Long left the Tigers to take the same position on Brian Kelly's staff at Notre Dame. To replace Long, Darrell Dickey was named the team's sole offensive coordinator. On May 12, 2017, it was announced that the University of Memphis signed Norvell to a one-year contract extension though the 2021 season and gave his assistant coaches raises. Kicker Jake Elliott was selected in the fifth round with the 153rd overall pick in the 2017 NFL draft by the Cincinnati Bengals.

Memphis went 10–3 in 2017. They started the season on August 31 with a 37–29 victory over Louisiana-Monroe. The Tigers were supposed to play UCF on September 9, but due to Hurricane Irma, the game, which originally had been moved up one day to September 8, was rescheduled for September 30. In order to reschedule the American Athletic Conference game, Memphis canceled their game with Georgia State, leaving the team with only 11 regular season games as opposed to the usual 12. On September 16, the Tigers picked up a 48–45 upset victory over #25 UCLA, marking only their second victory over a ranked opponent in 21 years. After a 44–31 victory over Football Championship Subdivision opponent Southern Illinois, Norvell's Tigers suffered their first loss of the season in the form of a 40–13 defeat in the rescheduled UCF game. On October 6, Memphis obliterated UConn by a margin of 70–31. That was followed by a 30–27 victory over #25 Navy, marking the first time the Tigers had ever defeated two ranked opponents in a single season in school history. Ranked #25 in the country in the AP Poll, the Tigers won their third consecutive contest with an exciting 42–38 win over Houston. A fourth straight win followed on October 27 with a 56–26 blowout victory over Tulane. Norvell's Tigers made it five consecutive games with a 41–14 victory over Tulsa. On November 18, the Tigers defeated SMU in a high-scoring 66–45 contest to clinch the American Athletic Conference's West Division and a berth in the 2017 American Athletic Conference Football Championship Game. Memphis finished off the regular season with a 70–13 beat down of East Carolina, recording their seventh consecutive victory. In the 2017 American Athletic Conference Football Championship Game, the Tigers lost a hard-fought 62–55 double overtime contest to UCF. Memphis accepted a berth in the 2017 Liberty Bowl on their home field, losing the game to Iowa State by a nail biting margin of 21–20. On December 5, 2017, Memphis signed Norvell to another contract extension, a five-year addition to his deal worth $13 million. The extension increased Norvell's annual pay to $2.6 million and made him the highest paid Group of 5 head coach in the country. Following the 2017 season, offensive coordinator Darrell Dickey left Norvell's staff to take the offensive coordinator position on newly hired head coach Jimbo Fisher's staff at Texas A&M. Kenny Dillingham was promoted from graduate assistant to replace Dickey. After starting the 2018 season 4–4 overall and 1–3 in conference play, Memphis would win their last 4 games, including a 52–31 victory over Houston in the final week of the regular season to finish in a 3-way tie for first in the West with Houston and Tulane. After tiebreakers, Memphis was awarded with the West conference berth to the 2018 American Athletic Conference Football Championship Game, facing off against UCF again in Orlando. Despite having a 38–21 lead at the half, the Tigers would only manage to score 3 points in the second half and ended up losing 56–41. Memphis accepted a berth in the 2018 Birmingham Bowl, losing to Wake Forest 37–34 to finish the season 8–6.

The 2019 season was one of the best seasons in the program's history, as the Tigers went 11–1 in the regular season and clinched a spot in the 2019 American Athletic Conference Football Championship Game on December 7, the team's 3rd consecutive championship appearance, this time they went up against Cincinnati, whom the Tigers defeated 34–24 the previous week to clinch home-field advantage for the championship game. After a back and forth battle between the two teams, Memphis quarterback Brady White would connect with wide receiver Antonio Gibson for a go-ahead touchdown with 1:14 left in the 4th quarter to give Memphis a 29–24 victory over the Bearcats to win the conference championship. Since they were the highest ranked group of 5 team in the final CFP poll, they were awarded a New Years' 6 bowl berth to the Cotton Bowl against Penn State.

The next day, Norvell resigned as Memphis head coach to become the new head coach at Florida State. Norvell's .717 winning percentage is the highest in Memphis history. Among Mike Norvell's other accomplishments leading the Tigers football program is becoming the first head coach in program history with multiple ten-win seasons, becoming the first head coach in program history to record four straight winning seasons and becoming the first Tigers head coach to leave without suffering a losing season. Norvell's record as Memphis head coach is 38–15.

=== Ryan Silverfield era (2019–2025) ===
On December 8, 2019, hours after Norvell's departure, Memphis offensive line coach and deputy head coach Ryan Silverfield was named as the Tigers' interim head coach for the Cotton Bowl, and on December 13, the school promoted Silverfield to the head coaching position. Despite not having any previous coordinator or head coaching experience, Silverfield took over after twenty years of coaching experience at numerous positions on both sides of the ball such as coaching offensive and defensive linemen and quarterbacks, as well as coaching experience at the high school, college and NFL levels. A popular choice among players to take over the Tigers head coaching position, Silverfield declared at his introductory press conference that being the Memphis head coach was his "dream job". When he was hired as head coach, Silverfield signed a five-year contract with the university.

In Silverfield's first season in 2020, the Tigers finished with an 8–3 record. They kicked off the season against rival Arkansas State, winning the game 37–24. After 30–27 loss to SMU, In the season's third game, Memphis overcame a 21-point deficit in the third quarter and defeated UCF 50–49 to post the program's largest-ever come from behind victory. After a 41–29 win over Temple, Silverfield's team lost its second game of the season, a 49–10 blowout loss to rival #7 Cincinnati that was the program's largest margin of defeat since 2011. The Tigers then won three consecutive games; 34–33 over South Florida, 56–14 over FCS opponent Stephen F. Austin, and 10–7 over Navy. After a 35–21 loss to Tulane, Memphis won its last two games of the season with a 30–27 win over Houston in the regular season finale and a 25–10 win over Florida Atlantic in the 2020 Montgomery Bowl.

The Tigers went 6–6 in 2021. They began the season with three victories; 42–17 over FCS opponent Nicholls State, 55–50 over rival Arkansas State and a 31–29 upset win over Mississippi State. Then the Tigers dropped three consecutive games; losing 31–28 to UTSA, 34–31 to Temple and 35–29 to Tulsa. Silverfield's Tigers then rebounded for a 35–17 win over Navy. After a 24–7 loss to UCF, Memphis defeated #23 SMU by a score of 28–25. The Tigers then lost back to back games with losses of 30–29 to East Carolina and 31–13 to #17 Houston. Memphis was invited to play in the 2021 Hawaii Bowl against Hawaii, but the game was canceled due to COVID-19 issues within the Rainbow Warriors football program.

Memphis finished with a 7–6 record in 2022. After losing the season opener by a score of 49–23 to Mississippi State, the Tigers reeled off four straight wins; 37–13 over Navy, 44–32 over rival Arkansas State, 44–34 over North Texas and 24–3 over Temple. Silverfield's team then lost four consecutive games; 33–32 to Houston, 47–45 in four overtimes to East Carolina, 38–28 to #25 Tulane and 35–28 to #25 UCF. The Tigers then responded with a 26–10 win over Tulsa for their 50th home win since 2014. After a 59–0 beatdown win over FCS opponent North Alabama, the Memphis Tigers lost the last game of the regular season by a score of 34–31 to SMU. The Tigers accepted an invitation to the 2022 First Responder Bowl, where they defeated Utah State by a score of 38–10. On December 30, 2022, on the heels of two consecutive mediocre seasons, Ryan Silverfield made changes to his coaching staff by firing special teams coordinator Charles Banks, offensive line coach Jim Bridge and wide receivers coach David Glidden and bringing in three new assistant coaches from outside the program to replace them.

The Tigers improved to a 10–3 record in 2023. They began with a 56–14 blowout win over FCS opponent Bethune–Cookman. Silverfield's team then posted wins of 37–3 over rival Arkansas State and 28–24 over Navy before losing their first game of the season to Missouri by a score of 34–27. After a 35–32 win over Boise State, the Tigers lost 31–21 to Tulane. Memphis then reeled off four straight wins; 45–21 over rival UAB, 45–42 over North Texas, 59–50 over South Florida and 44–38 in overtime over Charlotte. After a 38–34 loss to SMU, the Tigers won 45–21 over Temple to finish the regular season. Memphis accepted a berth in the 2023 Liberty Bowl played on their home field where they defeated Iowa State by a score of 36–26 to cap the program's fourth season of 10+ wins since 2014. On April 3, 2024, the University of Memphis signed Ryan Silverfield to a new five-year contract worth $12.25 million excluding incentives. Later that month, on April 29, 2024, it was announced that Memphis-based FedEx would donate $25 million to the football program's NIL fund.

Memphis went 11–2 in 2024. They kicked off the season on August 31 with a 40–0 win over FCS opponent North Alabama. After a 38–17 win over Troy, the Tigers traveled to Tallahassee, Florida to take on Florida State, led by former Memphis head coach Mike Norvell. Memphis emerged victorious with a 20–12 upset win. After suffering a 56–44 loss to Navy to open conference play, Silverfield's team reeled off wins of 24–7 over Middle Tennessee, 21–3 over South Florida, 52–44 over North Texas and 33–28 over Charlotte. After losing 44–36 to UTSA, the Tigers finished the regular season with wins of 27–20 over Rice, 53–18 over rival UAB and 34–24 over Tulane. The victory over Tulane gave Memphis their tenth win of the season and clinched the program's first-ever consecutive seasons of 10+ wins after the ten-win season in 2023. The Memphis Tigers accepted an invitation to the 2024 Frisco Bowl, where they defeated West Virginia by a score of 42–37. Silverfield departed Memphis after the 2025 season to take the head coaching position at Arkansas.

=== Charles Huff era (2026–present) ===
On December 8, 2025, Memphis hired Southern Miss head coach Charles Huff as their new head coach..
