= 1971 San Diego State Aztecs football team =

American college football season

1971 San Diego State Aztecs football
- Conference: Pacific Coast Athletic Association
- Record: 6–5 (2–3 PCAA)
- Head coach: Don Coryell (11th season)
- Offensive coordinator: Rod Dowhower (4th season)
- Offensive scheme: Air Coryell
- Defensive coordinator: Claude Gilbert (3rd season)
- Base defense: 4–3
- Home stadium: San Diego Stadium

1971 Pacific Coast Athletic Association football standings
	Conf.					Overall
Team	W		L		T	W		L		T
Long Beach State $	5	–	1	–	0	8	–	4	–	0
San Jose State	4	–	1	–	0	5	–	6	–	1
Fresno State	3	–	2	–	0	6	–	5	–	0
San Diego State	2	–	3	–	0	6	–	5	–	0
UC Santa Barbara	2	–	3	–	0	3	–	8	–	0
Pacific (CA)	1	–	4	–	0	3	–	8	–	0
Cal State Los Angeles	0	–	3	–	0	2	–	8	–	0
$ – Conference champion

The 1971 San Diego State Aztecs football team represented San Diego State College (Note: San Diego State University was known as San Diego State College from 1935 to 1971.) during the 1971 NCAA University Division football season as a member of the Pacific Coast Athletic Association (PCAA). (Note: The Big West Conference was known as the Pacific Coast Athletic Association from its founding in 1969 through 1987.)

The Aztecs were led by head coach Don Coryell, in his eleventh year, and played home games at San Diego Stadium (Note: San Diego County Credit Union Stadium (SDCCU Stadium) was known as San Diego Stadium from its opening in 1967 through 1980.) in San Diego, California. They finished the season with a record of six wins and five losses (6–5, 2–3 PCAA).

== Schedule ==
Date	Time	Opponent	Site	Result	Attendance	Source
September 25		at Southern Miss*	Mississippi Veterans Memorial Stadium; Jackson, MS	L 0–10	11,157	
October 2	7:30 p.m.	Northern Illinois*	San Diego Stadium; San Diego, CA	W 30–10	26,043	
October 9	8:03 p.m.	Pacific (CA)	San Diego Stadium; San Diego, CA	W 14–7	39,464	
October 16		at UC Santa Barbara	Campus Stadium; Santa Barbara, CA	W 27–23	5,500	
October 22		Utah State*	San Diego Stadium; San Diego, CA	W 36–20	25,047	
October 30		at Fresno State	Ratcliffe Stadium; Fresno, CA (rivalry)	L 10–17	11,140	
November 6		at San Jose State	Spartan Stadium; San Jose, CA	L 7–45	16,394	
November 13		Long Beach State^{†}	San Diego Stadium; San Diego, CA	L 7–12	28,468	
November 20		Arizona*	San Diego Stadium; San Diego, CA	W 39–10	21,681	
November 27		Iowa State*	San Diego Stadium; San Diego, CA	L 31–48	25,490	
December 4	7:30 p.m.	North Texas State*	San Diego Stadium; San Diego, CA	W 44–28	16,278	
*Non-conference game; ^{†}Homecoming; All times are in Pacific time

== Team players in the NFL ==
The following were selected in the 1972 NFL draft.

Player	Position	Round	Overall	NFL team
Willie Buchanon	Defensive back	1	7	Green Bay Packers
Tom Reynolds	Wide receiver	2	49	New England Patriots
Martin Imhof	Defensive end – Defensive tackle	4	84	St. Louis Cardinals
Robert West	Wide receiver	4	90	Dallas Cowboys
Bruce Ward	Guard	6	141	San Diego Chargers
Brian Sipe	Quarterback	13	330	Cleveland Browns
Marv Owens	Wide receiver	14	361	Minnesota Vikings

== Team awards ==
Award	Player
Most Valuable Player (John Simcox Memorial Trophy)	Tom Reynolds
Outstanding Offensive & Defensive Linemen (Byron H. Chase Memorial Trophy)	Steve Henson, Off; Ty Youngs, Def
Team captains Dr. R. Hardy / C.E. Peterson Memorial Trophy	Brian Sipe, Off; Willie Buchanon, Def
Most Inspirational Player	Ty Youngs
