= 1971 San Francisco State Gators football team =

American college football season

1971 San Francisco State Gators football
- Conference: Far Western Conference
- Record: 5–6 (2–4 FWC)
- Head coach: Vic Rowen (11th season)
- Offensive coordinator: Dick Logan (2nd season)
- Home stadium: Cox Stadium

1971 Far Western Conference football standings
	Conf.					Overall
Team	W		L		T	W		L		T
UC Davis +	5	–	1	–	0	9	–	1	–	0
No. 11 Chico State +	5	–	1	–	0	9	–	2	–	0
Cal State Hayward	3	–	2	–	1	7	–	2	–	1
Humboldt State	3	–	3	–	0	7	–	4	–	0
Sacramento State	2	–	3	–	1	4	–	5	–	1
San Francisco State	2	–	4	–	0	5	–	6	–	0
Sonoma State	0	–	6	–	0	2	–	8	–	0
+ – Conference co-champions; Rankings from UPI small college poll

The 1971 San Francisco State Gators football team represented San Francisco State College—now known as San Francisco State University—as a member of the Far Western Conference (FWC) during the 1971 NCAA College Division football season. Led by 11th-year head coach Vic Rowen, San Francisco State compiled an overall record of 5–6 with a mark of 2–4 in conference play, placing sixth in the FWC. For the season the team was outscored by its opponents 332 to 209. The Gators played home games at Cox Stadium in San Francisco.

== Schedule ==
Date	Opponent	Site	Result	Attendance	Source
September 11	Puget Sound*	Cox Stadium; San Francisco, CA	W 35–34	2,000	
September 18	at San Francisco*	Kezar Stadium; San Francisco, CA	W 35–12	2,000	
September 25	at Valley State*	North Campus Stadium; Northridge, CA	L 0–34	2,000–4,000	
October 2	at Azusa Pacific*	Azusa, CA	W 39–8	1,500	
October 9	Humboldt State	Cox Stadium; San Francisco, CA	L 17–24	1,500–3,000	
October 16	at UC Davis	Toomey Field; Davis, CA	L 10–28	5,400–6,000	
October 23	Sonoma State	Cox Stadium; San Francisco, CA	W 31–20	2,500	
October 30	at Santa Clara*	Buck Shaw Stadium; Santa Clara, CA	L 10–56	4,500	
November 6	at Chico State	University Stadium; Chico, CA	L 7–54	10,000	
November 13	Cal State Hayward	Cox Stadium; San Francisco, CA	W 18–17	2,500–3,000	
November 20	at Sacramento State	Hornet Stadium; Sacramento, CA	L 7–45	3,000–3,700	
*Non-conference game

== Team players in the NFL ==
The following San Francisco State players were selected in the 1972 NFL draft.

Player	Position	Round	Overall	NFL team
Dennis Pete	Defensive back	7	178	Oakland Raiders
