= 1971 UC Davis Aggies football team =

American college football season

1971 UC Davis Aggies football

FWC co-champion
- Conference: Far Western Conference
- Record: 9–1 (5–1 FWC)
- Head coach: Jim Sochor (2nd season)
- Captains: Dave Clerici; Jim Fiack; George Mock
- Home stadium: Toomey Field

1971 Far Western Conference football standings
	Conf.					Overall
Team	W		L		T	W		L		T
UC Davis +	5	–	1	–	0	9	–	1	–	0
No. 11 Chico State +	5	–	1	–	0	9	–	2	–	0
Cal State Hayward	3	–	2	–	1	7	–	2	–	1
Humboldt State	3	–	3	–	0	7	–	4	–	0
Sacramento State	2	–	3	–	1	4	–	5	–	1
San Francisco State	2	–	4	–	0	5	–	6	–	0
Sonoma State	0	–	6	–	0	2	–	8	–	0
+ – Conference co-champions; Rankings from UPI small college poll

The 1971 UC Davis Aggies football team represented the University of California, Davis as a member of the Far Western Conference (FWC) during the 1971 NCAA College Division football season. Led by second-year head coach Jim Sochor, UC Davis compiled an overall record of 9–1 with a mark of 5–1 in conference play, sharing the FWC title with Chico State. This started a remarkable run in which the Aggies won or shared the conference crown for 20 consecutive seasons. The team outscored its opponents 305 to 184 for the season. The Aggies played home games at Toomey Field in Davis, California.

== Schedule ==
Date	Opponent	Site	Result	Attendance	Source
September 18	Occidental*	Toomey Field; Davis, CA	W 48–9	3,800	
September 25	at San Francisco*	Kezar Stadium; San Francisco, CA	W 23–17	1,200	
October 2	UC Riverside*	Toomey Field; Davis, CA	W 41–7	5,500–6,500	
October 9	at Sonoma State	Cossacks Stadium (Note: Seawolf Stadium was known as Cossacks Stadium until 2002 when the University changed the mascot from Cossacks to Seawolves.); Rohnert Park, CA	W 48–16	1,100	
October 16	San Francisco State	Toomey Field; Davis, CA	W 28–20	5,400–6,000	
October 23	at Nevada*	Mackay Stadium; Reno, NV	W 14–13	5,400–7,000	
October 30	Chico State	Toomey Field; Davis, CA	L 20–38	7,000	
November 6	at Cal State Hayward	Pioneer Stadium; Hayward, CA	W 30–29	6,000	
November 13	Sacramento State	Toomey Field; Davis, CA (rivalry)	W 24–17	7,500	
November 20	at Humboldt State	Redwood Bowl; Arcata, CA	W 29–28	5,500–5,750	
*Non-conference game
