= 1971 UC Riverside Highlanders football team =

American college football season

1971 UC Riverside Highlanders football
- Conference: California Collegiate Athletic Association
- Record: 2–7–1 (0–2 CCAA)
- Head coach: Gary Knecht (2nd season)
- Home stadium: Highlander Stadium

1971 California Collegiate Athletic Association football standings
	Conf.					Overall
Team	W		L		T	W		L		T
Cal Poly $	3	–	0	–	0	6	–	5	–	0
Cal State Fullerton	3	–	1	–	0	7	–	4	–	0
Valley State	1	–	2	–	0	4	–	7	–	0
Cal Poly Pomona	1	–	3	–	0	6	–	5	–	0
UC Riverside	0	–	2	–	0	2	–	7	–	1
$ – Conference champion

The 1971 UC Riverside Highlanders football team represented the University of California, Riverside as a member of the California Collegiate Athletic Association (CCAA) during the 1971 NCAA College Division football season. Led by Gary Knecht in his second and final season as head coach, UC Riverside compiled an overall record of 2–7–1 with a mark of record of 0–2 in conference play, placing last out of five teams in the CCAA. The team was outscored by its opponents 256 to 120 for the season. The Highlanders played home games at Highlander Stadium in Riverside, California.

Knecht finished his tenure at UC Riverside with an overall record of 6–13–1, for a .325 winning percentage.

== Schedule ==
Date	Opponent	Site	Result	Attendance	Source
September 18	at San Diego*	Torero Stadium; San Diego, CA	W 29–18	1,500	
September 25	at Simon Fraser*	Thunderbird Stadium; University Endowment Lands, BC	L 9–46	2,200	
October 2	at UC Davis*	Toomey Field; Davis, CA	L 7–41	5,500–6,500	
October 9	Nevada*	Highlander Stadium; Riverside, CA	L 16–23	1,800–3,000	
October 16	Redlands*	Highlander Stadium; Riverside, CA	L 0–8	300–1,000	
October 23	Cal Poly Pomona	Highlander Stadium; Riverside, CA	L 0–35	1,500–3,000	
October 30	Whittier*	Highlander Stadium; Riverside, CA	T 22–22	1,000–1,500	
November 6	at Cal State Fullerton	Anaheim Stadium; Anaheim, CA	L 17–28	2,800–3,925	
November 13	at Occidental*	D. W. Patterson Field; Los Angeles, CA	W 20–14	1,000	
November 20	United States International*	Highlander Stadium; Riverside, CA	L 0–21	1,200–1,500	
*Non-conference game
