= 1971 Cal State Hayward Pioneers football team =

American college football season

1971 Cal State Hayward Pioneers football
- Conference: Far Western Conference
- Record: 7–2–1 (3–2–1 FWC)
- Head coach: Bob Rodrigo (1st season)
- Defensive coordinator: Tim Tierney (2nd season)
- Home stadium: Pioneer Stadium

1971 Far Western Conference football standings
	Conf.					Overall
Team	W		L		T	W		L		T
UC Davis +	5	–	1	–	0	9	–	1	–	0
No. 11 Chico State +	5	–	1	–	0	9	–	2	–	0
Cal State Hayward	3	–	2	–	1	7	–	2	–	1
Humboldt State	3	–	3	–	0	7	–	4	–	0
Sacramento State	2	–	3	–	1	4	–	5	–	1
San Francisco State	2	–	4	–	0	5	–	6	–	0
Sonoma State	0	–	6	–	0	2	–	8	–	0
+ – Conference co-champions; Rankings from UPI small college poll

The 1971 Cal State Hayward Pioneers football team represented California State College at Hayward—now known as California State University, East Bay—as a member of the Far Western Conference (FWC) during the 1971 NCAA College Division football season. Led by first-year head coach Bob Rodrigo, Cal State Hayward compiled an overall record of 7–2–1 with a mark of 3–2–1 in conference play, placing third in the FWC. The team outscored its opponents 272 to 185 for the season. The Pioneers played home games at Pioneer Stadium in Hayward, California.

== Schedule ==
Date	Opponent	Site	Result	Attendance	Source
September 11	at Fresno State*	Ratcliffe Stadium; Fresno, CA	W 18–14	8,769–11,500	
September 18	at Valley State*	North Campus Stadium; Northridge, CA	W 26–3	5,000	
October 2	at San Francisco*	Kezar Stadium; San Francisco, CA	W 48–20	3,000	
October 9	Chico State	Pioneer Stadium; Hayward, CA	W 28–20	6,000	
October 16	at Sonoma State	Cossacks Stadium (Note: Seawolf Stadium was known as Cossacks Stadium until 2002 when the University changed the mascot from Cossacks to Seawolves.); Rohnert Park, CA	W 42–21	3,000	
October 23	at Sacramento State	Hornet Stadium; Sacramento, CA	T 27–27	2,500–4,100	
October 30	Humboldt State	Pioneer Stadium; Hayward, CA	W 20–17	2,500–4,500	
November 6	UC Davis	Pioneer Stadium; Hayward, CA	L 29–30	6,000	
November 13	at San Francisco State	Cox Stadium; San Francisco, CA	L 17–18	2,500–3,000	
November 27	Cal Poly*	Pioneer Stadium; Hayward, CA	W 17–15	3,000	
*Non-conference game
