= UC Riverside Highlanders football =

- First season: 1955; 71 years ago
- Last season: 1975; 51 years ago
- Head coach: Bob Toledo (final coach)
- Stadium: Highlander Stadium
- Location: Riverside, California
- Conference: CCAA
- All-time record: 84–83–8 (.503)
- Bowl record: 0–0–0 (–)
- Colors: Blue and gold

The UC Riverside Highlanders football program represented the University of California, Riverside from the 1955 through the 1975 college football seasons. The Highlanders originally competed as an Independent before they joined the California Collegiate Athletic Association (CCAA) in 1969. They played their home games at Highlander Stadium in Riverside, California. During their 21 years of competition, the Highlanders compiled an all-time record of 84 wins, 83 losses and 8 ties (84–83–8).

== History ==
In 1954, former California All-America Rod Franz was hired to serve as the first head coach of the Riverside program. After only one season, Franz resigned, and Carl Selin was hired as head coach. Selin remained in his position through the 1958 season when he resigned to become an assistant coach at the Coast Guard Academy.

After Gil Allan served as head coach for only the 1964 season, in March 1965, former Highlanders quarterback Pete Kettela was named head coach. Kettela resigned in 1970 after he compiled an overall record of 23 wins, 19 losses and 2 ties (23–19–2) during his five-year tenure. He resigned his position as he felt the school was not expending appropriate resources on the football program.

After serving as an assistant coach for five seasons, in February 1970 Gary Knecht was promoted to head coach. He compiled an overall record of six wins, thirteen losses and one tie (6–13–1) from 1970 through the 1971 season. Knecht resigned as head coach in March 1972, just as coach Kettela had done previously, as the university had not placed enough resources into the football program. Wayne Howard was hired in 1972, and prior to his resignation in December 1973 to become the head coach at Long Beach State, led the Highlanders to a record of seventeen wins and three losses (17–3). Under Howard, the 1972 squad finished the season with a record of nine wins and one loss (9–1) to capture a share of the first conference championship for the Highlanders.

On December 21, 1973, Bob Toledo was hired as the Highlanders' head coach. As head coach, Toledo led the Highlanders to an overall record of fifteen wins and six losses (15–6) and consecutive conference championships in 1974 and 1975.

=== Disestablishment of program ===
On December 4, 1975, the football program was discontinued by the university with a general lack of attendance and poor gate receipts cited for its being discontinued. Then-UCR chancellor Ivan Hinderaker noted that football used more than half of the athletic department's total $305,000 budget and averaged 3,869 fans in attendance for the four home games during the final season, unable to fill the 5,500-seat stadium.

Toledo and his staff remained under contract until July 1, 1976.

== Head coaches ==
Tenure	Coach	Years	Record	Pct.
1955	Rod Franz	1	1–3-1	.000
1956–1958	Carl Selin	3	4–13–3	.275
1959–1963	Jim Whitley	5	17–21–2	.450
1964	Gil Allan	1	2–7	.222
1965–1969	Pete Kettela	5	23–19–2	.545
1970–1971	Gary Knecht	2	6–13–1	.325
1972–1973	Wayne Howard	2	17–3–0	.850
1974–1975	Bob Toledo	2	15–6–0	.714
Totals		21	84–83–8	.503

== All-time seasons ==
During their 21 years of competition, the Highlanders compiled an all-time record of 84 wins, 83 losses and 8 ties (84–83–8).

Year	Team	Overall	Conference	Standing	Bowl/playoffs	Coaches^{#}	AP^{°}
Rod Franz (Independent) (1955)
1955	UC Riverside	1-3-1				—	—
Franz:		1-3–1					
Carl Selin (Independent) (1956–1958)
1956	UC Riverside	1–6				—	—
1957	UC Riverside	1–4–1				—	—
1958	UC Riverside	2–3–2				—	—
Selin:		4–13–3					
Jim Whitley (Independent) (1955)
1959	UC Riverside	5–2				—	—
1960	UC Riverside	7–0–1				—	—
1961	UC Riverside	1–7–0				—	—
1962	UC Riverside	3–5–0				—	—
1963	UC Riverside	1–7–1				—	—
Whitley:		17–21–2					
Gil Allan (Independent) (1964)
1964	UC Riverside	2–7				—	—
Allan:		2–7					
Pete Kettela (Independent/California Collegiate Athletic Association) (1965–1969)
1965	UC Riverside	6–1				—	—
1966	UC Riverside	4–5				—	—
1967	UC Riverside	4–4–1				—	—
1968	UC Riverside	5–1–1				—	—
1969	UC Riverside	3–6	0–1	4th		—	—
Kettela:		23–19–2	0–1				
Gary Knecht (California Collegiate Athletic Association) (1970–1971)
1970	UC Riverside	4–6	0–2	5th		—	—
1971	UC Riverside	2–7–1	0–2	5th		—	—
Knecht:		6–13–1	0–4				
Wayne Howard (California Collegiate Athletic Association) (1972–1973)
1972	UC Riverside	9–1	3–0	T-1st		—	—
1973	UC Riverside	8–2	3–1	2nd		—	—
Howard:		17–3	6–1				
Bob Toledo (California Collegiate Athletic Association) (1974–1975)
1974	UC Riverside	8–3	4–0	1st		—	—
1975	UC Riverside	7–3	4–0	1st		—	—
Toledo:		15–6	8–0				
Total:		84–83–8					
National championship Conference title Conference division title or championship game berth
^{†}Indicates Bowl Coalition, Bowl Alliance, BCS, or CFP / New Years' Six bowl.; ^{#}Rankings from final Coaches Poll.; ^{°}Rankings from final AP Poll.

== Highlanders in the NFL ==
UC Riverside has seven alumni that have played in the National Football League (NFL).

Name	Position	Year	Overall pick	Team
Michael Basinger	DE	1973	Free Agent	Green Bay Packers
Russ Bolinger (Note: After he started his college career at Riverside, Russ Bolinger transferred after the 1973 season to follow head coach Wayne Howard to Long Beach State.)	G/T	1976	68	Detroit Lions
Dan Bunz (Note: After he started his college career at Riverside, Dan Bunz transferred to Long Beach State.)	LB	1978	24	San Francisco 49ers
Butch Johnson	WR	1976	87	Dallas Cowboys
Frank Johnson		1974	102	Los Angeles Rams
Calvin Sweeney (Note: After he started his college career at Riverside, Calvin Sweeney transferred to USC.)	WR	1979	110	Pittsburgh Steelers
Derek Williams		1974	221	Los Angeles Rams
