= 1971 Chico State Wildcats football team =

American college football season

1971 Chico State Wildcats football

FWC co-champion

Camellia Bowl, L 28–32 vs. Boise State
- Conference: Far Western Conference
- Record: 9–2 (5–1 FWC)
- Head coach: Pete Riehlman (4th season)
- Home stadium: College Field

1971 Far Western Conference football standings
	Conf.					Overall
Team	W		L		T	W		L		T
UC Davis +	5	–	1	–	0	9	–	1	–	0
No. 11 Chico State +	5	–	1	–	0	9	–	2	–	0
Cal State Hayward	3	–	2	–	1	7	–	2	–	1
Humboldt State	3	–	3	–	0	7	–	4	–	0
Sacramento State	2	–	3	–	1	4	–	5	–	1
San Francisco State	2	–	4	–	0	5	–	6	–	0
Sonoma State	0	–	6	–	0	2	–	8	–	0
+ – Conference co-champions; Rankings from UPI small college poll

The 1971 Chico State Wildcats football team represented Chico State College—now known as California State University, Chico—as a member of the Far Western Conference (FWC) during the 1971 NCAA College Division football season. Led by fourth-year head coach Pete Riehlman, Chico State compiled an overall record of 9–2 with a mark of 5–1 in conference play, sharing the FWC title with UC Davis. At the end of the regular season, the Aggies were invited to play in the Camellia Bowl, where they lost to Boise State, 32–28. This was the only postseason bowl game in the history of the Chico State Wildcats football program. The team outscored its opponents 394 to 164 for the season. The Wildcats played home games at College Field in Chico, California. This was the last year the stadium was named College Field. With the school's change to University status in 1972, the stadium was renamed "University Stadium".

== Schedule ==
Date	Opponent	Site	Result	Attendance	Source
September 18	Southern Oregon*	College Field; Chico, CA	W 31–9		
September 25	at Redlands*	Redlands Stadium; Redlands, CA	W 31–0		
October 2	at United States International*	Balboa Stadium?; San Diego, CA	W 27–26		
October 9	at Cal State Hayward	Pioneer Stadium; Hayward, CA	L 20–28	6,000	
October 16	Sacramento State	College Field; Chico, CA	W 37–7	7,200	
October 23	Humboldt State	College Field; Chico, CA	W 34–14	7,000	
October 30	at UC Davis	Toomey Field; Davis, CA	W 38–20	7,000	
November 6	San Francisco State	College Field; Chico, CA	W 54–7	10,000	
November 13	San Francisco*	College Field; Chico, CA	W 41–7		
November 20	at Sonoma State	Cossacks Stadium (Note: Cossacks Stadium was renamed in 2002 to Seawolf Stadium when the University changed the name of the mascot to Seawolves.); Rohnert Park, CA	W 53–14		
December 11	at Boise State*	Charles C. Hughes Stadium; Sacramento, CA (Camellia Bowl)	L 28–32	16,313	
*Non-conference game

== Team players in the NFL ==
The following Chico State players were selected in the 1972 NFL draft.

Player	Position	Round	Overall	NFL team
Jewell McCullar	Linebacker	15	382	Cleveland Browns
