= 1971 Cal State Fullerton Titans football team =

American college football season

1971 Cal State Fullerton Titans football

Mercy Bowl, W 17–14 vs. Fresno State
- Conference: California Collegiate Athletic Association
- Record: 7–4 (3–1 CCAA)
- Head coach: Dick Coury (2nd season)
- Home stadium: Anaheim Stadium; Santa Ana Stadium; Los Angeles Memorial Coliseum

1971 California Collegiate Athletic Association football standings
	Conf.					Overall
Team	W		L		T	W		L		T
Cal Poly $	3	–	0	–	0	6	–	5	–	0
Cal State Fullerton	3	–	1	–	0	7	–	4	–	0
Valley State	1	–	2	–	0	4	–	7	–	0
Cal Poly Pomona	1	–	3	–	0	6	–	5	–	0
UC Riverside	0	–	2	–	0	2	–	7	–	1
$ – Conference champion

The 1971 Cal State Fullerton Titans football team represented California State College at Fullerton—now known as California State University, Fullerton—as a member of the California Collegiate Athletic Association (CCAA) during the 1971 NCAA College Division football season. Led by Dick Coury in his second and final season as head coach, Cal State Fullerton compiled an overall record of 7–4 with a mark of 3–1 in conference play, placing second in the CCAA. At the end of the season, the Titans took part in the second Mercy Bowl, a benefit for the families of three Cal State Fullerton assistant coaches who had perished in a plane crash a month earlier. Cal State Fullerton played home games at three different sites: four games Anaheim Stadium in Anaheim, California, one at Santa Ana Stadium in Santa Ana, California, and one at the Los Angeles Memorial Coliseum in Los Angeles.

== Schedule ==
Date	Opponent	Site	Result	Attendance	Source
September 25	Southern Utah State*	Santa Ana Stadium; Santa Ana, CA	W 42–13	3,173	
October 2	at Whittier*	Memorial Stadium; Whittier, CA	W 13–3		
October 8	at Cal Poly Pomona	Mt. San Antonio College; Walnut, CA	W 24–12	3,500	
October 16	Valley State	Anaheim Stadium; Anaheim, CA	W 36–8	4,950	
October 23	at Cal Lutheran*	Thousand Oaks High; Thousand Oaks, CA	L 14–24	5,500	
October 29	Cal State Los Angeles*	Anaheim Stadium; Anaheim, CA	L 17–20	3,317–3,400	
November 6	UC Riverside	Anaheim Stadium; Anaheim, CA	W 28–17	2,800–3,925	
November 13	at United States International*	Balboa Stadium; San Diego, CA	W 40–30	3,500	
November 20	at Cal Poly	Mustang Stadium; San Luis Obispo, CA	L 14–23	4,150	
November 27	Grambling*	Los Angeles Memorial Coliseum; Los Angeles, CA	L 26–59	60,000–60,415	5
December 11	Fresno State*	Anaheim Stadium; Anaheim, CA (Mercy Bowl)	W 17–14	16,854	
*Non-conference game

== Team players in the NFL ==
No Cal State Fullerton Titans were selected in the 1972 NFL draft.

The following finished their college career in 1971, were not drafted, but played in the NFL.

Player	Position	First NFL team
Mike Ernst	Quarterback	1972 Denver Broncos
