= 1971 Cal Poly Pomona Broncos football team =

American college football season

1971 Cal Poly Pomona Broncos football
- Conference: California Collegiate Athletic Association
- Record: 6–5 (1–3 CCAA)
- Head coach: Roy Anderson (3rd season)
- Home stadium: Kellogg Field

1971 California Collegiate Athletic Association football standings
	Conf.					Overall
Team	W		L		T	W		L		T
Cal Poly $	3	–	0	–	0	6	–	5	–	0
Cal State Fullerton	3	–	1	–	0	7	–	4	–	0
Valley State	1	–	2	–	0	4	–	7	–	0
Cal Poly Pomona	1	–	3	–	0	6	–	5	–	0
UC Riverside	0	–	2	–	0	2	–	7	–	1
$ – Conference champion

The 1971 Cal Poly Pomona Broncos football team represented California State Polytechnic College, Kellogg-Voorhis—now known as California State Polytechnic University, Pomona—as a member of the California Collegiate Athletic Association (CCAA) during the 1971 NCAA College Division football season. Led by third-year head coach Roy Anderson, Cal Poly Pomona compiled an overall record of 6–5 with a mark of 1–3 in conference play, placing fourth in the CCAA. The team was outscored by its opponents 260 to 246 for the season. The Broncos played home games at Kellogg Field in Pomona, California.

== Schedule ==
Date	Opponent	Site	Result	Attendance	Source
September 18	at Southern Utah State*	Eccles Coliseum; Cedar City, UT	W 9–7	2,250	
September 25	Sacramento State*	Kellogg Field; Pomona, CA	W 14–13	3,000	
October 2	Cal State Los Angeles*	Kellogg Field; Pomona, CA	L 25–29	3,100	
October 8	Cal State Fullerton	Mt. San Antonio College; Walnut, CA	L 12–24	3,500	
October 16	San Diego*	Kellogg Field; Pomona, CA	W 50–19	3,000	
October 23	at UC Riverside	Highlander Stadium; Riverside, CA	W 35–0	1,500–3,000	
October 30	Occidental*	Kellogg Field; Pomona, CA	W 18–0	2,500–3,000	
November 6	at Valley State	North Campus Stadium; Northridge, CA	L 31–37	1,500	
November 13	at Santa Clara*	Buck Shaw Stadium; Santa Clara, CA	L 7–48	5,120	
November 20	Saint Mary's*	Kellogg Field; Pomona, CA	W 33–20	2,100–2,900	
December 4	at Cal Poly	Mustang Stadium; San Luis Obispo, A	L 12–63	2,700	
*Non-conference game

== Team players in the NFL ==
The following Cal Poly Pomona players were selected in the 1972 NFL draft.

Player	Position	Round	Overall	NFL team
John Wiegmann	Wide receiver	16	393	Cincinnati Bengals
