= 1971 Pacific Tigers football team =

American college football season

1971 Pacific Tigers football
- Conference: Pacific Coast Athletic Association
- Record: 3–8 (1–4 PCAA)
- Head coach: Homer Smith (2nd season)
- Home stadium: Pacific Memorial Stadium

1971 Pacific Coast Athletic Association football standings
	Conf.					Overall
Team	W		L		T	W		L		T
Long Beach State $	5	–	1	–	0	8	–	4	–	0
San Jose State	4	–	1	–	0	5	–	6	–	1
Fresno State	3	–	2	–	0	6	–	5	–	0
San Diego State	2	–	3	–	0	6	–	5	–	0
UC Santa Barbara	2	–	3	–	0	3	–	8	–	0
Pacific (CA)	1	–	4	–	0	3	–	8	–	0
Cal State Los Angeles	0	–	3	–	0	2	–	8	–	0
$ – Conference champion

The 1971 Pacific Tigers football team represented the University of the Pacific (UOP) as a member of the Pacific Coast Athletic Association (PCAA) during the 1971 NCAA University Division football season. Led by Homer Smith in his second and final season as head coach, the Tigers compiled an overall record of 3–8 with a mark of 1–4 in conference play, placing sixth in the PCAA, and were outscored by opponents 198 to 176. The team played home games at Pacific Memorial Stadium in Stockton, California.

== Schedule ==
Date	Time	Opponent	Site	Result	Attendance	Source
September 11	7:30 p.m.	Miami (OH)*	Pacific Memorial Stadium; Stockton, CA	L 10–17	20,011	
September 18	6:30 p.m.	at UTEP*	Sun Bowl; El Paso, TX	L 3–21	15,353	
September 25		at Long Beach State	Veterans Stadium; Long Beach, CA	L 14–15	6,853	
October 2	7:45 p.m.	UC Santa Barbara	Pacific Memorial Stadium; Stockton, CA	L 7–21	12,350	
October 9	8:03 p.m.	at San Diego State	San Diego Stadium; San Diego, CA	L 7–14	39,464	
October 16		Idaho*^{†}	Pacific Memorial Stadium; Stockton, CA	L 12–13	10,132–10,281	
October 23	1:15 p.m.	at Montana*	Dornblaser Field; Missoula, MT	W 30–14	10,200	
October 30	7:32 p.m.	at San Jose State	Spartan Stadium; San Jose, CA (Victory Bell)	L 18–28	12,162	
November 6	7:30 p.m.	Hawaii*	Pacific Memorial Stadium; Stockton, CA	W 40–17	6,226	
November 13	10:30 a.m.	at Western Michigan*	Waldo Stadium; Kalamazoo, MI	L 21–25	18,000	
November 20	7:30 p.m.	Fresno State	Pacific Memorial Stadium; Stockton, CA	W 14–13	5,719–10,000	
*Non-conference game; ^{†}Homecoming; All times are in Pacific time
