= 1971 UC Santa Barbara Gauchos football team =

American college football season

1971 UC Santa Barbara Gauchos football
- Conference: Pacific Coast Athletic Association
- Record: 3–8 (2–3 PCAA)
- Head coach: Andy Everest (2nd season)
- Home stadium: Campus Stadium

1971 Pacific Coast Athletic Association football standings
| | Conf. | | | | | Overall |
| Team | W | | L | | T | W | | L | | T |
|---|---|---|---|---|---|---|---|---|---|---|
| Long Beach State $ | 5 | – | 1 | – | 0 | 8 | – | 4 | – | 0 |
| San Jose State | 4 | – | 1 | – | 0 | 5 | – | 6 | – | 1 |
| Fresno State | 3 | – | 2 | – | 0 | 6 | – | 5 | – | 0 |
| San Diego State | 2 | – | 3 | – | 0 | 6 | – | 5 | – | 0 |
| UC Santa Barbara | 2 | – | 3 | – | 0 | 3 | – | 8 | – | 0 |
| Pacific (CA) | 1 | – | 4 | – | 0 | 3 | – | 8 | – | 0 |
| Cal State Los Angeles | 0 | – | 3 | – | 0 | 2 | – | 8 | – | 0 |
$ – Conference champion

The 1971 UC Santa Barbara Gauchos football team represented the University of California, Santa Barbara (UCSB) as a member of the Pacific Coast Athletic Association (PCAA) during the 1971 NCAA University Division football season. Led by Andy Everest in his second and final season as head coach, the Gauchos compiled an overall record of 3–8 with a mark of 2–3 in conference play, tying for fourth place in the PCAA. The team played home games at Campus Stadium in Santa Barbara, California.

Citing financial problems, UCSB dropped football as an intercollegiate sport after the 1971 season. The school did not field another football team until 1983, when a student-run club team was formed. Competition sanctioned by the National Collegiate Athletic Association (NCAA) did not resume until 1986.

== Schedule ==
| Date | Time | Opponent | Site | Result | Attendance | Source |
|---|---|---|---|---|---|---|
| September 11 | | at Washington* | Husky Stadium; Seattle, WA | L 7–65 | 56,000 | |
| September 18 | | at Tennessee* | Neyland Stadium; Knoxville, TN | L 6–48 | 65,114 | |
| October 2 | 7:45 p.m. | at Pacific (CA) | Pacific Memorial Stadium; Stockton, CA | W 21–7 | 12,350 | |
| October 9 | | at Valley State* | Devonshire Downs; Northridge, CA | L 14–15 | 4,500 | |
| October 16 | | San Diego State | Campus Stadium; Santa Barbara, CA | L 23–27 | 5,500 | |
| October 23 | | Long Beach State | Campus Stadium; Santa Barbara, CA | L 10–31 | 8,500 | |
| October 30 | | at Hawaii* | Honolulu Stadium; Honolulu, HI | L 14–23 | 12,624 | |
| November 6 | | at Cal State Los Angeles | East L.A. College Stadium; Monterey Park, CA | W 26–0 | 1,500 | |
| November 13 | | at Cal Poly* | Mustang Stadium; San Luis Obispo, CA | L 3–9 | 3,250 | |
| November 20 | | Santa Clara* | Campus Stadium; Santa Barbara, CA | W 28–22 | 6,500 | |
| November 27 | 1:30 p.m. | San Jose State | Campus Stadium; Santa Barbara, CA | L 10–55 | 4,800 | |
*Non-conference game; All times are in Pacific time

== Team players in the NFL ==
The following Santa Barbara Gaucho players were selected in the 1972 NFL draft.

| Player | Position | Round | Overall | NFL team |
| Kent Pederson | Tight end | 11 | 261 | Cincinnati Bengals |
