= 1971 Long Beach State 49ers football team =

American college football season

1971 Long Beach State 49ers football

PCAA champion
- Conference: Pacific Coast Athletic Association
- Record: 8–4 (5–1 PCAA)
- Head coach: Jim Stangeland (3rd season)
- Home stadium: Veterans Stadium

1971 Pacific Coast Athletic Association football standings
	Conf.					Overall
Team	W		L		T	W		L		T
Long Beach State $	5	–	1	–	0	8	–	4	–	0
San Jose State	4	–	1	–	0	5	–	6	–	1
Fresno State	3	–	2	–	0	6	–	5	–	0
San Diego State	2	–	3	–	0	6	–	5	–	0
UC Santa Barbara	2	–	3	–	0	3	–	8	–	0
Pacific (CA)	1	–	4	–	0	3	–	8	–	0
Cal State Los Angeles	0	–	3	–	0	2	–	8	–	0
$ – Conference champion

The 1971 Long Beach State 49ers football team represented California State College, Long Beach (Note: California State University, Long Beach (Long Beach State) was known as California State College, Long Beach from 1964 to 1971.) during the 1971 NCAA University Division football season.

Cal State Long Beach competed in the Pacific Coast Athletic Association. (Note: The Big West Conference was known as the Pacific Coast Athletic Association from its founding in 1969 through 1987.) The team was led by third year head coach Jim Stangeland, and played the majority of their home games at Veterans Stadium adjacent to the campus of Long Beach City College in Long Beach, California. One home game was played at Anaheim Stadium in Anaheim, California. They finished the season as Champions of the PCAA, with a record of eight wins and four losses (8–4, 5–1 PCAA).

== Schedule ==
Date	Time	Opponent	Site	Result	Attendance	Source
September 11	5:30 p.m.	at Ole Miss*	Mississippi Veterans Memorial Stadium; Jackson, MS	L 13–29	33,500	
September 18	5:30 p.m.	at Northern Illinois*	Huskie Stadium; DeKalb, IL	L 38–48	11,687	
September 25	7:30 p.m.	Pacific (CA)	Veterans Memorial Stadium; Long Beach, CA	W 15–14	6,853	
October 2	7:30 p.m.	Valley State*	Veterans Memorial Stadium; Long Beach, CA	W 34–7	6,559	
October 8	7:30 p.m.	San Jose State	Anaheim Stadium; Anaheim, CA	L 28–30	10,490–10,500	
October 16	7:30 p.m.	Cal State Los Angeles	Veterans Memorial Stadium; Long Beach, CA	W 36–7	4,128	
October 23	7:30 p.m.	at UC Santa Barbara	Campus Stadium; Santa Barbara, CA	W 31–10	8,500	
October 30	7:30 p.m.	at Cal Poly*	Mustang Stadium; San Luis Obispo, CA	W 20–7	6,633	
November 5	7:30 p.m.	Fresno State	Veterans Memorial Stadium; Long Beach, CA	W 30–13	10,310	
November 13	7:30 p.m.	at San Diego State	San Diego Stadium; San Diego, CA	W 12–7	28,468	
November 20	11:00 p.m.	at Hawaii*	Honolulu Stadium; Honolulu, HI	W 46–21	14,510	
November 27	6:00 p.m.	at UTEP*	Sun Bowl; El Paso, TX	L 32–38	6,530	
*Non-conference game; All times are in Pacific time

== Team players in the NFL ==
The following were selected in the 1972 NFL draft.

Player	Position	Round	Overall	NFL team
John Kahler	Defensive end	6	153	Kansas City Chiefs
Jim Fassel	Quarterback	7	167	Chicago Bears
John Turner	Tight end	11	270	San Diego Chargers
Jim Kirby	Wide receiver	16	407	Los Angeles Rams

The following finished their college career in 1970, were not drafted, but played in the NFL.

Player	Position	First NFL team
Reggie Berry	Defensive back	1972 San Diego Chargers
