= Gary Knecht =

Faculty member at Azusa Pacific University and former college football coach

Biographical details
- Born: September 24, 1939 (age 87); Lodi, California, U.S.

Playing career
- 1958: Stockton
- 1959–1960: UC Santa Barbara
- Position: End

Coaching career (HC unless noted)
- 1961: UC Santa Barbara (GA)
- 1962: Sacramento State (GA)
- 1963–1964: Merced HS (CA) (assistant)
- 1965–1969: UC Riverside (DC)
- 1970–1971: UC Riverside
- 1972: Cal Poly Pomona (assistant)
- 1973–1974: Idaho (LB)
- 1975: Idaho (DL)
- 1976–1983: Walla Walla
- 1985–1990: Oregon State (LB)
- 1995–2003: Azusa Pacific (DC)

Administrative career (AD unless noted)
- 1984: Walla Walla

Head coaching record
- Overall: 6–13–1 (college); 51–21–1 (junior college)

Accomplishments and honors

Championships
- 2 NWAACC (1979, 1981); 1 NWAACC Southern Division (1982)

Gary Knecht (born September 29, 1939) is a faculty member at Azusa Pacific University and former college football coach. Knecht has served as an assistant coach at several universities and as the head coach at UC Riverside from 1970 to 1971 and at Walla Walla Community College from 1976 to 1983. During his career as a head coach, Knecht compiled an overall record of 6–13–1 at Riverside and 52–19–1 at Walla Walla.

== Coaching career ==
In February 1970, Knecht was promoted to the head coach position at Riverside after the resignation of Pete Kettela. In March 1973, Knecht resigned as head coach after he led Riverside to an overall record of 6–13–1. From Riverside, Knecht served as a defensive assistant at Cal Poly Pomona in 1972 before he was hired as the linebackers coach at Idaho in February 1973.

He stayed at Idaho through the 1975 season before he resigned in February 1976 to become the head coach at Walla Walla Community College. At Walla Walla, Knecht led the Warriors to an overall record 52–19–1 during his tenure as head coach from 1976 through 1983. In 1984, he served as athletic director at Walla Walla before he was hired at Oregon State as an assistant coach in 1985. Knecht finished his coaching career at Azusa Pacific where he served as defensive coordinator from the 1995 through 2003 seasons.

== Head coaching record ==
=== College ===
Year	Team	Overall	Conference	Standing	Bowl/playoffs
UC Riverside Highlanders (California Collegiate Athletic Association) (1970–1971)
1970	UC Riverside	4–6	0–2	5th	
1971	UC Riverside	2–7–1	0–2	5th	
UC Riverside:		6–13–1	0–4		
Total:		6–13–1			

=== Junior college ===
Year	Team	Overall	Conference	Standing	Bowl/playoffs
Walla Walla Warriors (Northwest Community College Conference / Northwest Athletic Association of Community Colleges) (1976–1983)
1976	Walla Walla	6–3	6–3	2nd (Eastern)	
1977	Walla Walla	4–5	4–4	T–3rd (Eastern)	
1978	Walla Walla	3–4–1	3–4–1	4th (Southern)	
1979	Walla Walla	8–1	6–0	1st	
1980	Walla Walla	7–2	4–2	3rd	
1981	Walla Walla	8–2	6–1	1st (Southern)	
1982	Walla Walla	7–2	6–1	1st (Southern)	
1983	Walla Walla	8–2	6–2	2nd	
Walla Walla:		51–21–1	41–17–1		
Total:		51–21–1			
National championship Conference title Conference division title or championship game berth
