= 1971 Cal State Los Angeles Diablos football team =

American college football season

1971 Cal State Los Angeles Diablos football
- Conference: Pacific Coast Athletic Association
- Record: 2–8 (0–3 PCAA)
- Head coach: Foster Andersen (1st season)
- Home stadium: East Los Angeles College Stadium

1971 Pacific Coast Athletic Association football standings
	Conf.					Overall
Team	W		L		T	W		L		T
Long Beach State $	5	–	1	–	0	8	–	4	–	0
San Jose State	4	–	1	–	0	5	–	6	–	1
Fresno State	3	–	2	–	0	6	–	5	–	0
San Diego State	2	–	3	–	0	6	–	5	–	0
UC Santa Barbara	2	–	3	–	0	3	–	8	–	0
Pacific (CA)	1	–	4	–	0	3	–	8	–	0
Cal State Los Angeles	0	–	3	–	0	2	–	8	–	0
$ – Conference champion

The 1971 Cal State Los Angeles Diablos football team represented California State College at Los Angeles—now known as California State University, Los Angeles—as a member of the Pacific Coast Athletic Association (PCAA) during the 1971 NCAA University Division football season. Led by first-year head coach Foster Andersen, Cal State Los Angeles compiled an overall record of 2–8 with a mark of 0–3 in conference play, placing last out of seven teams in the PCAA. This was the third straight year the Diablos had a new head coach. The team was held to a touchdown or less in eight of their ten games. For the year, they scored 90 points while allowing 269. Cal State Los Angeles played home games at the East Los Angeles College Stadium in Monterey Park, California.

== Schedule ==
Date	Opponent	Site	Result	Attendance	Source
September 18	at United States International*	Balboa Stadium?; San Diego, CA	L 7–20	2,500–5,000	
September 25	at Idaho State*	ASISU Minidome; Pocatello, ID	L 6–19	9,500–10,000	
October 2	at Cal Poly Pomona*	Kellogg Field; Pomona, CA	W 29–25	3,100–3,500	
October 9	at Hawaii*	Honolulu Stadium; Honolulu, HI	L 0–26	10,000–14,449	
October 16	at Long Beach State*	Veterans Stadium; Long Beach, CA	L 7–36	4,128–6,000	
October 23	at Fresno State	Ratcliffe Stadium; Fresno, CA	L 7–47	7,500–7,723	
October 29	at Cal State Fullerton	Anaheim Stadium; Anaheim, CA	W 20–17	3,317–3,400	
November 6	UC Santa Barbara	East Los Angeles College Stadium; Monterey Park, CA	L 0–26	1,500	
November 12	Cal Lutheran*	East Los Angeles College Stadium; Monterey Park, CA	L 7–22	2,500–2,731	
November 20	Valley State*	East Los Angeles College Stadium; Monterey Park, CA	L 7–31	1,000–1,500	
*Non-conference game
