= Dewey King =

American football player, coach, and college athletics administrator (1925–2021)

Biographical details
- Born: October 1, 1925; Cando, North Dakota, U.S.
- Died: April 13, 2021 (aged 95); Waukesha, Wisconsin, U.S.

Playing career
- 1945–1948: North Dakota
- Positions: Center, linebacker

Coaching career (HC unless noted)
- 1949: North Dakota (freshmen)
- 1950–1951: Canton McKinley HS (OH) (assistant)
- 1952–1953: Michigan State (assistant)
- 1954–1959: Penn (assistant)
- 1960–1967: Rutgers (assistant)
- 1970–1972: San Jose State
- 1973–1979: Wheaton (IL)

Administrative career (AD unless noted)
- 1970: San Jose State (interim AD)
- 1980–1985: Carroll (WI)

Head coaching record
- Overall: 39–54–1
- Bowls: 0–1

DeWayne "Dewey" King (October 1, 1925 – April 13, 2021) was an American football player, coach, and college athletics administrator. He served as the head football coach at San Jose State University from 1970 to 1972 and at Wheaton College in Wheaton, Illinois from 1973 to 1979, compiling a career college football record of 39–54–1. King was also the athletic director at Carroll University in Waukesha, Wisconsin.

== Coaching career ==
King was the head football coach for San Jose State University from 1970 to 1972. In 1973, he was named head football coach at Wheaton College in Wheaton, Illinois. He held that position for seven seasons, from 1973 until 1979. His coaching record at Wheaton was 29–34.

King was inducted into the North Dakota Sports Hall of Fame in 2008. He is also a member of the University of North Dakota Hall of Fame.

From 1980 to 1985, King served as athletic director at Carroll University in Waukesha, Wisconsin.

== Head coaching record ==
Year	Team	Overall	Conference	Standing	Bowl/playoffs
San Jose State Spartans (Pacific Coast Athletic Association) (1970–1972)
1970	San Jose State	1–7 (Note: Joe McMullen coached the first three games of the season, leading the Spartans to a record of 1–2 with a 1–0 mark in conference play.)	1–3	T–4th	
1971	San Jose State	5–6–1	4–1	2nd	L Pasadena
1972	San Jose State	4–7	1–3	T–3rd	
San Jose State Spartans:		10–20	6–7		
Wheaton Crusaders (College Conference of Illinois and Wisconsin) (1973–1979)
1973	Wheaton	2–7	2–6	T–7th	
1974	Wheaton	4–5	4–4	6th	
1975	Wheaton	5–4	5–3	T–2nd	
1976	Wheaton	6–3	5–3	T–3rd	
1977	Wheaton	5–4	4–4	T–4th	
1978	Wheaton	6–3	5–3	T–3rd	
1979	Wheaton	1–8	1–7	8th	
Wheaton:		29–34	26–30		
Total:		39–54–1			
