= 1971 Valley State Matadors football team =

American college football season

1971 Valley State Matadors football
- Conference: California Collegiate Athletic Association
- Record: 4–7 (1–2 CCAA)
- Head coach: Rod Humenuik (1st season)
- Home stadium: North Campus Stadium

1971 California Collegiate Athletic Association football standings
	Conf.					Overall
Team	W		L		T	W		L		T
Cal Poly $	3	–	0	–	0	6	–	5	–	0
Cal State Fullerton	3	–	1	–	0	7	–	4	–	0
Valley State	1	–	2	–	0	4	–	7	–	0
Cal Poly Pomona	1	–	3	–	0	6	–	5	–	0
UC Riverside	0	–	2	–	0	2	–	7	–	1
$ – Conference champion

The 1971 Valley State Matadors football team represented San Fernando Valley State College—now known as California State University, Northridge—as a member of the California Collegiate Athletic Association (CCAA) during the 1971 NCAA College Division football season. Led by first-year head coach Rod Humenuik, Valley State compiled an overall record of 4–7 with a mark of 1–2 in conference play, placing third in the CCAA. The Matadors played home games at the new campus stadium, North Campus Stadium in Northridge, California.

== Schedule ==
Date	Opponent	Site	Result	Attendance	Source
September 18	Cal State Hayward*	North Campus Stadium; Northridge, CA	L 3–26	5,000	
September 25	San Francisco State*	North Campus Stadium; Northridge, CA	W 34–0	2,000–4,000	
October 2	at Long Beach State*	Veterans Stadium; Long Beach, CA	L 7–34	6,559	
October 9	UC Santa Barbara*	North Campus Stadium; Northridge, CA	W 15–14	4,500	
October 16	at Cal State Fullerton	Anaheim Stadium; Anaheim, CA	L 8–36	4,950	
October 23	Cal Poly	North Campus Stadium; Northridge, CA	L 0–19	4,500	
October 30	at Northern Arizona*	Lumberjack Stadium; Flagstaff, AZ	L 0–48	5,870	
November 6	Cal Poly Pomona	North Campus Stadium; Northridge, CA	W 37–31	1,500	
November 13	at Fresno State*	Ratcliffe Stadium; Fresno, CA	L 7–23	5,457	
November 20	at Cal State Los Angeles*	East Los Angeles College Stadium; Monterey Park, CA	W 31–7	1,000–1,500	
November 27	Weber State*	North Campus Stadium; Northridge, CA	L 7–44	1,000	
*Non-conference game

== Team players in the NFL ==
The following Valley State players were selected in the 1972 NFL draft.

Player	Position	Round	Overall	NFL team
Leon Pettigrew	Tackle	13	331	San Francisco 49ers
Ted Covington	Wide receiver	13	333	Oakland Raiders
