= 1971 Humboldt State Lumberjacks football team =

American college football season

1971 Humboldt State Lumberjacks football
- Conference: Far Western Conference
- Record: 7–4 (3–3 FWC)
- Head coach: Bud Van Deren (6th season)
- Home stadium: Redwood Bowl

1971 Far Western Conference football standings
| | Conf. | | | | | Overall |
| Team | W | | L | | T | W | | L | | T |
|---|---|---|---|---|---|---|---|---|---|---|
| UC Davis + | 5 | – | 1 | – | 0 | 9 | – | 1 | – | 0 |
| No. 11 Chico State + | 5 | – | 1 | – | 0 | 9 | – | 2 | – | 0 |
| Cal State Hayward | 3 | – | 2 | – | 1 | 7 | – | 2 | – | 1 |
| Humboldt State | 3 | – | 3 | – | 0 | 7 | – | 4 | – | 0 |
| Sacramento State | 2 | – | 3 | – | 1 | 4 | – | 5 | – | 1 |
| San Francisco State | 2 | – | 4 | – | 0 | 5 | – | 6 | – | 0 |
| Sonoma State | 0 | – | 6 | – | 0 | 2 | – | 8 | – | 0 |
+ – Conference co-champions; Rankings from UPI small college poll

The 1971 Humboldt State Lumberjacks football team represented Humboldt State College—now known as California State Polytechnic University, Humboldt—as a member of the Far Western Conference (FWC) during the 1971 NCAA College Division football season. Led by sixth-year head coach Bud Van Deren, the Lumberjacks compiled an overall record of 7–4 with a mark of 3–3 in conference play, placing fourth in the FWC. The team outscored its opponents 288 to 209 for the season. Humboldt State played home games at the Redwood Bowl in Arcata, California.

== Schedule ==
| Date | Opponent | Site | Result | Attendance | Source |
|---|---|---|---|---|---|
| September 11 | Humboldt State alumni* | Redwood Bowl; Arcata, CA | W 23–20 | 6,000 | |
| September 18 | Eastern Washington* | Redwood Bowl; Arcata, CA | W 35–19 | 5,500 | |
| September 25 | at Southern Oregon* | Fuller Field; Ashland, OR | W 51–7 | 500 | |
| October 2 | Cal Poly* | Redwood Bowl; Arcata, CA | L 21–39 | 6,000–6,500 | |
| October 9 | at San Francisco State | Cox Stadium; San Francisco, CA | W 24–17 | 1,500–3,000 | |
| October 16 | San Francisco* | Redwood Bowl; Arcata, CA | W 43–21 | 6,000 | |
| October 23 | at Chico State | College Field; Chico, CA | L 14–34 | 7,000 | |
| October 30 | at Cal State Hayward | Pioneer Stadium; Hayward, CA | L 17–20 | 2,500–4,500 | |
| November 6 | Sacramento State | Redwood Bowl; Arcata, CA | W 26–3 | 5,000–6,000 | |
| November 13 | at Sonoma State | Cossacks Stadium (Note: Seawolf Stadium was known as Cossacks Stadium until 2002 when the University changed the mascot from Cossacks to Seawolves.); Rohnert Park, CA | W 6–0 | 1,000 | |
| November 20 | UC Davis | Redwood Bowl; Arcata, CA | L 28–29 | 5,500–5,750 | |
*Non-conference game
