= 1971 Fresno State Bulldogs football team =

American college football season

1971 Fresno State Bulldogs football

Mercy Bowl, L 14–17 at Cal State Fullerton
- Conference: Pacific Coast Athletic Association
- Record: 6–5 (3–2 CCAA)
- Head coach: Darryl Rogers (6th season)
- Defensive coordinator: Bob Padilla (4th season)
- Home stadium: Ratcliffe Stadium

1971 Pacific Coast Athletic Association football standings
	Conf.					Overall
Team	W		L		T	W		L		T
Long Beach State $	5	–	1	–	0	8	–	4	–	0
San Jose State	4	–	1	–	0	5	–	6	–	1
Fresno State	3	–	2	–	0	6	–	5	–	0
San Diego State	2	–	3	–	0	6	–	5	–	0
UC Santa Barbara	2	–	3	–	0	3	–	8	–	0
Pacific (CA)	1	–	4	–	0	3	–	8	–	0
Cal State Los Angeles	0	–	3	–	0	2	–	8	–	0
$ – Conference champion

The 1971 Fresno State Bulldogs football team represented Fresno State College—now known as California State University, Fresno—as a member of the Pacific Coast Athletic Association (PCAA) during the 1971 NCAA University Division football season. Led by sixth-year head coach Darryl Rogers, Fresno State compiled an overall record of 6–5 with a mark of 3–2 in conference play, placing third in the PCAA. The Bulldogs played their home games at Ratcliffe Stadium on the campus of Fresno City College in Fresno, California.

At the end of the season, a charity bowl game was played to benefit the children of three Cal State Fullerton coaches and a pilot who had been killed in an airplane crash a month earlier. The game was called Mercy Bowl II, and was played on December 11 at the Los Angeles Memorial Coliseum.

== Schedule ==
Date	Time	Opponent	Site	Result	Attendance	Source
September 11		Cal State Hayward*	Ratcliffe Stadium; Fresno, CA	L 14–18	11,000	
September 18	7:30 p.m.	San Jose State	Ratcliffe Stadium; Fresno, CA (rivalry)	W 14–7	9,500	
September 25		at Montana State*	Gatton Field; Bozeman, MT	L 28–37	7,500	
October 2		Hawaii*	Ratcliffe Stadium; Fresno, CA (rivalry)	W 19–8	9,441	
October 16		at Cal Poly*	Mustang Stadium; San Luis Obispo, CA	W 13–10	8,500	
October 23		Cal State Los Angeles	Ratcliffe Stadium; Fresno, CA	W 47–7	7,723	
October 30		San Diego State	Ratcliffe Stadium; Fresno, CA (rivalry)	W 17–10	11,140	
November 5		at Long Beach State	Veterans Stadium; Long Beach, CA	L 13–30	10,310	
November 13		Valley State*	Ratcliffe Stadium; Fresno, CA	W 23–7	5,457	
November 20	7:30 p.m.	at Pacific (CA)	Pacific Memorial Stadium; Stockton, CA	L 13–14	5,719–10,000	
December 11		at Cal State Fullerton*	Los Angeles Memorial Coliseum; Los Angeles, CA (Mercy Bowl II)	L 14–17	16,854	
*Non-conference game; All times are in Pacific time
