= 1971 Cal Lutheran Kingsmen football team =

American college football season

1971 Cal Lutheran Kingsmen football

NAIA Division II national champion

NAIA Championship Game, W 30–14 vs. Westminster (PA)
- Conference: Independent
- Record: 8–0–2
- Head coach: Bob Shoup (10th season)

1971 NAIA Division II independents football records
	Conf.			Overall
Team	W	L	T	W		L		T
No. 1 Cal Lutheran ^		–		8	–	0	–	2
No. 2 Westminster (PA) ^		–		8	–	1	–	1
Iowa Wesleyan		–		7	–	1	–	1
Geneva		–		7	–	2	–	0
Missouri Southern		–		7	–	3	–	0
Simon Fraser		–		7	–	3	–	0
Earlham		–		6	–	3	–	0
Franklin (IN)		–		5	–	5	–	0
Oklahoma Panhandle State		–		5	–	6	–	0
Texas Lutheran		–		5	–	6	–	0
Azusa Pacific		–		4	–	5	–	0
Eureka		–		3	–	5	–	1
Grove City		–		2	–	6	–	1
Missouri Western		–		2	–	7	–	0
Waynesburg		–		2	–	7	–	0
Austin		–		1	–	8	–	0
Georgetown (KY)		–		1	–	8	–	0
^ – NAIA Division II playoff participant; Rankings from NAIA Division II poll

The 1971 Cal Lutheran Kingsmen football team was an American football team that represented California Lutheran University as an independent during the 1971 NAIA Division II football season. In their tenth season under head coach Bob Shoup, the Kingsmen compiled an undefeated 8–0–2 record and won the NAIA Division II national championship, defeating Westminster (Pennsylvania), 30–14, in the championship game.

Shoup was named NAIA Coach of the Year. Key players included tight end Ralph Miller.

The team played its home games at Thousand Oaks High School in Thousand Oaks, California.

== Schedule ==
Date	Opponent	Site	Result	Attendance	Source
September 18	at Augustana (SD)	Sioux Falls, SD	T 31–31		
October 1	Redlands	Thousand Oaks High; Thousand Oaks, CA	W 21–7		
October 9	Whittier	Thousand Oaks High; Thousand Oaks, CA	W 20–7		
October 16	at La Verne	La Verne, CA	T 6–6		
October 23	Cal State Fullerton	Thousand Oaks High; Thousand Oaks, CA	W 24–14	5,500	
November 6	at Sonoma State	Cossacks Stadium; Rohnert Park, CA	W 40–6		
November 12	at Cal State Los Angeles	East L.A. College Stadium; Monterey Park, CA	W 22–7	2,731	
November 20	Pacific Lutheran	Thousand Oaks High; Thousand Oaks, CA	W 27–6		
November 27	Montana Tech	Thousand Oaks High; Thousand Oaks, CA (NAIA Division II Semifinal)	W 34–6	3,800	
December 4	Westminster (PA)	Thousand Oaks High; Thousand Oaks, CA (NAIA Division II Championship Game)	W 30–14	2,700	
