= 1971 Cal Poly Mustangs football team =

American college football season

1971 Cal Poly Mustangs football

CCAA champion
- Conference: California Collegiate Athletic Association
- Record: 6–5 (3–0 CCAA)
- Head coach: Joe Harper (4th season)
- Home stadium: Mustang Stadium

1971 California Collegiate Athletic Association football standings
	Conf.					Overall
Team	W		L		T	W		L		T
Cal Poly $	3	–	0	–	0	6	–	5	–	0
Cal State Fullerton	3	–	1	–	0	7	–	4	–	0
Valley State	1	–	2	–	0	4	–	7	–	0
Cal Poly Pomona	1	–	3	–	0	6	–	5	–	0
UC Riverside	0	–	2	–	0	2	–	7	–	1
$ – Conference champion

The 1971 Cal Poly Mustangs football team represented California Polytechnic State College—now known as California Polytechnic State University, San Luis Obispo—as a member of the California Collegiate Athletic Association (CCAA) during the 1971 NCAA College Division football season. Led by fourth-year head coach Joe Harper, Cal Poly compiled an overall record of 6–5 with a mark of 3–0 in conference play, winning the CCAA title for the third consecutive season. The Mustangs played home games at Mustang Stadium in San Luis Obispo, California.

== Schedule ==
Date	Opponent	Site	Result	Attendance	Source
September 18	at Boise State*	Bronco Stadium; Boise, ID	L 14–18	12,357	
September 25	No. 4 Montana*	Mustang Stadium; San Luis Obispo, CA	L 14–38	7,500	
October 2	at Humboldt State*	Redwood Bowl; Arcata, CA	W 39–21	6,000–6,500	
October 16	Fresno State*	Mustang Stadium; San Luis Obispo, CA	L 10–13	8,500	
October 23	at Valley State	Devonshire Downs; Northridge, CA	W 19–0	4,500	
October 30	Long Beach State*	Mustang Stadium; San Luis Obispo, CA	L 7–20	6,633	
November 6	at UNLV*	Las Vegas Stadium; Whitney, NV	W 13–3	4,762–6,500	
November 13	UC Santa Barbara*	Mustang Stadium; San Luis Obispo, CA	W 9–3	3,250	
November 20	Cal State Fullerton	Mustang Stadium; San Luis Obispo, CA	W 23–14	4,150	
November 27	at Cal State Hayward*	Pioneer Stadium; Hayward, CA	L 15–17	3,000	
December 4	Cal Poly Pomona	Mustang Stadium; San Luis Obispo, CA	W 63–12	2,700	
*Non-conference game; Rankings from AP Poll released prior to the game

== Team players in the NFL ==
The following Cal Poly Mustangs were selected in the 1972 NFL draft.

Player	Position	Round	Overall	NFL team
Fredrick Wegis	Defensive back	12	289	Cincinnati Bengals
