= 1971 San Jose State Spartans football team =

American college football season

1971 San Jose State Spartans football
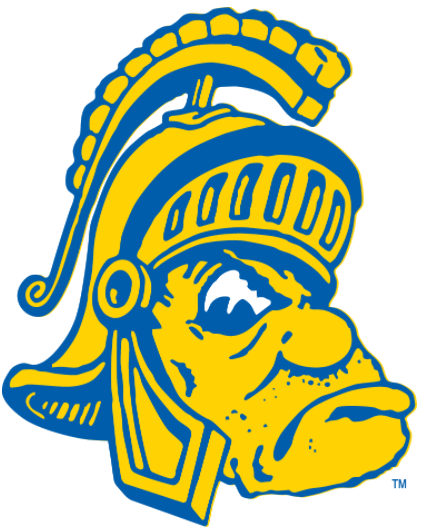

Pasadena Bowl, L 9–28 vs. Memphis State
- Conference: Pacific Coast Athletic Association
- Record: 5–6–1 (4–1 PCAA)
- Head coach: Dewey King (2nd season)
- Home stadium: Spartan Stadium

1971 Pacific Coast Athletic Association football standings
	Conf.					Overall
Team	W		L		T	W		L		T
Long Beach State $	5	–	1	–	0	8	–	4	–	0
San Jose State	4	–	1	–	0	5	–	6	–	1
Fresno State	3	–	2	–	0	6	–	5	–	0
San Diego State	2	–	3	–	0	6	–	5	–	0
UC Santa Barbara	2	–	3	–	0	3	–	8	–	0
Pacific (CA)	1	–	4	–	0	3	–	8	–	0
Cal State Los Angeles	0	–	3	–	0	2	–	8	–	0
$ – Conference champion

The 1971 San Jose State Spartans football team represented San Jose State College (Note: San Jose State University was known as San Jose State College from 1935 to 1971.) in the Pacific Coast Athletic Association (PCAA) (Note: The Big West Conference was known as the Pacific Coast Athletic Association from its founding in 1969 through 1987.) during the 1971 NCAA University Division football season. Led by second-year head coach Dewey King, they played home games at Spartan Stadium in San Jose, California. With a 55–10 road rout of UC Santa Barbara, the Spartans ended the regular season at an even .500 with five wins, five losses, and one tie (5–5–1, 4–1 PCAA).

This season, San Jose State made its first bowl appearance as a major college program in the Pasadena Bowl. They faced the Memphis State Tigers on Saturday, December 18, but lost 9–28 to finish at 5–6–1.

== Schedule ==
Date	Time	Opponent	Site	Result	Attendance	Source
September 18	7:30 p.m.	at Fresno State	Ratcliffe Stadium; Fresno, CA (rivalry)	L 7–14	9,500	
September 25	1:31 p.m.	at California*	California Memorial Stadium; Berkeley, CA	L 10–34	16,000	
October 2	5:30 p.m.	at Houston*	Houston Astrodome; Houston, TX	L 20–34	31,754	
October 8	8:05 p.m.	at Long Beach State	Anaheim Stadium; Anaheim, CA	W 30–28	10,490–10,500	
October 16	7:30 p.m.	New Mexico*	Spartan Stadium; San Jose, CA	T 21–21	15,374	
October 23	1:30 p.m.	at Oregon*	Autzen Stadium; Eugene, OR	L 14–34	14,000	
October 30	7:32 p.m.	Pacific (CA)^{†}	Spartan Stadium; San Jose, CA (Victory Bell)	W 28–18	12,162	
November 6	7:30 p.m.	San Diego State	Spartan Stadium; San Jose, CA	W 45–7	16,394	
November 13	1:35 p.m.	at No. 10 Stanford*	Stanford Stadium; Stanford, CA (rivalry)	W 13–12	41,000	
November 20	7:30 p.m.	No. 9 Arizona State*	Spartan Stadium; San Jose, CA	L 6–49	23,500	
November 27	1:30 p.m.	at UC Santa Barbara	Campus Stadium; Santa Barbara, CA	W 55–10	4,800	
December 18		vs. Memphis State*	Rose Bowl; Pasadena CA (Pasadena Bowl)	L 9–28	15,244	
*Non-conference game; ^{†}Homecoming; Rankings from AP Poll released prior to the game; All times are in Pacific time

== NFL draft ==
Two Spartans were selected in the 1972 NFL draft.

Player	Position	Round	Overall	NFL club
Dave Chaney	Linebacker	14	360	Kansas City Chiefs
Eric Dahl	Defensive back	16	400	New England Patriots
