= Rod Franz =

American football player and coach (1925–1999)

Biographical details
- Born: February 8, 1925; San Francisco, California, U.S.
- Died: November 27, 1999 (aged 74); Sacramento, California, U.S.

Playing career
- 1946–1949: California
- Position: Guard

Coaching career (HC unless noted)
- 1951–1954: Mount Diabo HS (CA)
- 1955: UC Riverside
- 1956–1957: California (assistant)

Head coaching record
- Overall: 1–3–1 (college)

Accomplishments and honors

Awards
- Consensus All-American (1949); 2× First-team All-American (1947, 1948); 3× First-team All-PCC (1947, 1948, 1949)
- College Football Hall of Fame; Inducted in 1977 (profile)

Rodney Thomas Franz (February 8, 1925 – November 27, 1999) was an American football player and coach. He played college football as a guard at the University of California, Berkeley from 1946 to 1949. As a senior, he was a unanimous selection on the 1949 College Football All-America Team. Franz was the first head football coach at University of California, Riverside, serving for one season, in 1955, and compiling a record of 1–3–1. He was inducted into the College Football Hall of Fame as player in 1977.

Franz began his coaching career in 1951 at Mount Diablo High School in Concord, California, where was head football coach for four seasons. He returned to his alma mater, California, after his stint at UC Riverside and was an assistant football coach there in 1956 and 1957. Franz later worked as a lobbyist for the East Bay Municipal Utility District. He died on November 27, 1999, after suffering from prostate cancer for nine years.

== Head coaching record ==
Year	Team	Overall	Conference	Standing	Bowl/playoffs
UC Riverside Highlanders (Independent) (1955)
1955	UC Riverside	1–3–1			
UC Riverside:		1–3–1			
Total:		1–3–1			
