= 1971 Sacramento State Hornets football team =

American college football season

1971 Sacramento State Hornets football
- Conference: Far Western Conference
- Record: 4–5–1 (2–3–1 FWC)
- Head coach: Ray Clemons (11th season)
- Home stadium: Hornet Stadium

1971 Far Western Conference football standings
	Conf.					Overall
Team	W		L		T	W		L		T
UC Davis +	5	–	1	–	0	9	–	1	–	0
No. 11 Chico State +	5	–	1	–	0	9	–	2	–	0
Cal State Hayward	3	–	2	–	1	7	–	2	–	1
Humboldt State	3	–	3	–	0	7	–	4	–	0
Sacramento State	2	–	3	–	1	4	–	5	–	1
San Francisco State	2	–	4	–	0	5	–	6	–	0
Sonoma State	0	–	6	–	0	2	–	8	–	0
+ – Conference co-champions; Rankings from UPI small college poll

The 1971 Sacramento State Hornets football team represented Sacramento State College—now known as California State University, Sacramento—as a member of the Far Western Conference (FWC) during the 1971 NCAA College Division football season. Led by 11th-year head coach Ray Clemons, Sacramento State compiled an overall record of 4–5–1 with a mark of 2–3–1 in conference play, placing fifth in the FWC. The team was outscored by its opponents 238 to 228 for the season. The Hornets played home games at Hornet Stadium in Sacramento, California.

== Schedule ==
Date	Opponent	Site	Result	Attendance	Source
September 18	Santa Clara*	Hornet Stadium; Sacramento, CA	L 14–35	3,200	
September 25	at Cal Poly Pomona*	Kellogg Field; Pomona, CA	L 13–14	3,000	
October 2	Sonoma State	Hornet Stadium; Sacramento, CA	W 23–22	3,029	
October 9	San Francisco*	Hornet Stadium; Sacramento, CA	W 41–25	3,400	
October 16	at Chico State	University Stadium; Chico, CA	L 7–37	7,200	
October 23	Cal State Hayward	Hornet Stadium; Sacramento, CA	T 27–27	2,500–4,100	
October 30	at Saint Mary's*	Moraga, CA	W 38–21		
November 6	at Humboldt State	Redwood Bowl; Arcata, CA	L 3–26	5,000–6,000	
November 13	at UC Davis	Toomey Field; Davis, CA (rivalry)	L 17–24	7,500	
November 20	San Francisco State	Hornet Stadium; Sacramento, CA	W 45–7	3,700	
*Non-conference game
