= 1971 Sonoma State Cossacks football team =

American college football season

1971 Sonoma State Cossacks football
- Conference: Far Western Conference
- Record: 2–8 (0–6 FWC)
- Head coach: Carl Peterson (2nd season)
- Home stadium: Cossacks Stadium

1971 Far Western Conference football standings
	Conf.					Overall
Team	W		L		T	W		L		T
UC Davis +	5	–	1	–	0	9	–	1	–	0
No. 11 Chico State +	5	–	1	–	0	9	–	2	–	0
Cal State Hayward	3	–	2	–	1	7	–	2	–	1
Humboldt State	3	–	3	–	0	7	–	4	–	0
Sacramento State	2	–	3	–	1	4	–	5	–	1
San Francisco State	2	–	4	–	0	5	–	6	–	0
Sonoma State	0	–	6	–	0	2	–	8	–	0
+ – Conference co-champions; Rankings from UPI small college poll

The 1971 Sonoma State Cossacks football team represented Sonoma State College—now known as Sonoma State University—as a member of the Far Western Conference (FWC) during the 1971 NCAA College Division football season. Led by Carl Peterson in his second and final season as head coach, Sonoma State compiled an overall record of 2–8 with a mark of 0–6 in conference play, placing last out of sevens teams in the FWC. The team was outscored by their opponents 277 to 153 for the season. The played Cossacks played home games at Cossacks Stadium (Note: Cossacks Stadium was renamed in 2002 to Seawolf Stadium when the University changed the name of the mascot to Seawolves.) in Rohnert Park, California.

Peterson finished his stint as Sonoma State with an overall record of 6–12–1, for a .342 winning percentage. In April 1972, Sonoma State announced it no longer field a football team due to financial issues. They did not have another team until a club team was started in 1979.

== Schedule ==
Date	Opponent	Site	Result	Attendance	Source
September 18	at Whittier*	Memorial Stadium; Whittier, CA	L 7–10		
September 25	Oregon Tech*	Cossacks Stadium; Rohnert Park, CA	W 34–14		
October 2	at Sacramento State	Hornet Stadium; Sacramento, CA	L 22–23	3,029	
October 9	UC Davis	Cossacks Stadium; Rohnert Park, CA	L 16–48	1,100	
October 16	Cal State Hayward	Cossacks Stadium; Rohnert Park, CA	L 21–42	3,000	
October 23	at San Francisco State	Cox Stadium; San Francisco, CA	L 20–31	2,500	
October 30	at San Francisco*	Kezar Stadium; San Francisco, CA	W 13–10	411	
November 6	Cal Lutheran*	Cossacks Stadium; Rohnert Park, CA	L 6–40		
November 13	Humboldt State	Cossacks Stadium; Rohnert Park, CA	L 0–6	1,000	
November 20	Chico State	Cossacks Stadium; Rohnert Park, CA	L 14–53		
*Non-conference game
