= Mercy Bowl =

Charity American college football games

The Mercy Bowl was the name to two one-off charity bowl games played in 1961 and 1971 at the Los Angeles Memorial Coliseum and Anaheim Stadium, respectively.

The first was played between Fresno State University and Bowling Green State University on November 23, 1961, as a special fundraiser in memory of sixteen Cal Poly-San Luis Obispo football players killed in a plane crash following a game against Bowling Green a year earlier. The game, attended by 33,145 spectators, raised $200,000 for the surviving widows and children and for a memorial in their honor. Pro Football Hall of Fame coach and Cal Poly alumnus John Madden commented in 2008 that "it wouldn't be a bad idea to play a game like that again. Hold a bowl game for a cause. There are a lot of good ones. I'd like to see that."

A second Mercy Bowl was staged in 1971 between Cal State Fullerton and Fresno State, intended to benefit the fourteen surviving children of three CSUF assistant coaches and a pilot who died in an airplane crash a month earlier. The NCAA initially rejected the game due to a lack of available postseason dates, but pressure from California Governor Ronald Reagan and President Richard Nixon's advisor Robert Finch convinced them to approve it. CSUF head coach Dick Coury described the game, which his team won, as "the biggest victory I've been a part of." With 16,854 in attendance, the second Mercy Bowl raised over $50,000.

== Game results ==
Date	Winner		Loser		Venue	Location	Attendance
November 23, 1961	Fresno State	36	Bowling Green	6	Los Angeles Memorial Coliseum	Los Angeles, California	33,145
December 11, 1971	Cal State Fullerton	17	Fresno State	14	Anaheim Stadium	Anaheim, California	16,854

== See also ==
- List of college bowl games
