= 1971 Pasadena Bowl =

Memphis State Tigers	San Jose State Spartans
(4–6)	(5–5–1)
Missouri Valley	PCAA
28	9
Head coach: Billy J. Murphy	Head coach: Dewey King
	1	2	3	4	Total
Memphis State	7	7	0	14	28
San Jose State	3	0	0	6	9
- Date: December 18, 1971
- Season: 1971
- Stadium: Rose Bowl
- Location: Pasadena, California
- MVP: Dornell Harris (RB, MSU); Tom Carlsen (DB, MSU)
- Attendance: 15,244

The 1971 Pasadena Bowl was a college football bowl game played on December 18 at the Rose Bowl in Pasadena, California. Part of the bowl schedule of the 1971 NCAA University Division football season, the Saturday afternoon game featured San Jose State Spartans of the Pacific Coast Athletic Association (PCAA) and the Memphis State Tigers from the Missouri Valley Conference (MVC).

== Game summary ==
Trailing 3–0 late in the first quarter, Memphis State defensive back Tom Carlsen blocked a John McMillen punt and recovered it in the end zone to pull ahead 7–3. Dornell Harris scored on a nine-yard run in the second quarter to make it 14–3 at halftime.

After a scoreless third quarter, the Tigers' final two scores were set up by turnovers. Tailback Paul "Skeeter" Gowen added on to the score with an 18-yard run after an interception and Clifton Taylor sealed the game for the Tigers from two yards out following a fumble recovery. The Spartans could only muster a late touchdown to narrow the final margin, with their five turnovers hurting them despite outgaining them 350–290.

Memphis State coach Billy J. Murphy retired after the bowl win, which was the final edition of the Pasadena Bowl as a University Division (now Division I FBS) bowl game.
