= Billy J. Murphy =

American football player, coach, and administrator (1921–2008)

Biographical details
- Born: January 13, 1921; Lorenzo, Texas, U.S.
- Died: February 21, 2008 (aged 87); Memphis, Tennessee, U.S.

Playing career
- 1941–1942: Mississippi State
- 1946: Mississippi State
- Position: Halfback

Coaching career (HC unless noted)
- 1947–1951: Memphis State (backfield)
- 1952–1953: Mississippi State (backfield)
- 1954–1957: Minnesota (backfield)
- 1958–1971: Memphis State

Administrative career (AD unless noted)
- 1966–1981: Memphis State

Head coaching record
- Overall: 91–44–1
- Bowls: 1–0

Accomplishments and honors

Championships
- 3 MVC (1968–1969, 1971)
- College Football Hall of Fame; Inducted in 2022 (profile)

Billy Jack "Spook" Murphy (January 13, 1921 – February 21, 2008) was an American college football player, coach, and athletics administrator. He served as the head football coach at Memphis State University—now known as the University of Memphis—from 1958 to 1971, compiling a record of 91–44–1. Murphy's 1963 team was the school's first undefeated team in 25 years, and Murphy was named national coach of the year. Murphy was also the athletic director at Memphis State from 1966 to 1981. He grew up in Siloam Springs, Arkansas and played college football at Mississippi State University.

Murphy met all eligibility requirements and was first on the 2007 College Football Hall of Fame ballot. In 2022, he was inducted.

Murphy died in a retirement community in Memphis, Tennessee in 2008.

== Head coaching record ==
Year	Team	Overall	Conference	Standing	Bowl/playoffs	Coaches^{#}	AP^{°}
Memphis State Tigers (NCAA University Division independent) (1958–1967)
1958	Memphis State	4–5					
1959	Memphis State	6–4					
1960	Memphis State	8–2					
1961	Memphis State	8–2					
1962	Memphis State	8–1					
1963	Memphis State	9–0–1				14	
1964	Memphis State	5–4					
1965	Memphis State	5–5					
1966	Memphis State	7–2					
1967	Memphis State	6–3					
Memphis State Tigers (Missouri Valley Conference) (1968–1971)
1968	Memphis State	6–4	5–0	1st			
1969	Memphis State	8–2	5–0	1st			
1970	Memphis State	6–4	2–2	3rd			
1971	Memphis State	5–6	4–1	1st	W Pasadena		
Memphis State:		91–44–1	16–3				
Total:		91–44–1					
National championship Conference title Conference division title or championship game berth
^{#}Rankings from final Coaches Poll.; ^{°}Rankings from final AP Poll.
