= Martin Imhof =

American football player (born 1949)

No. 62, 66, 64, 73
- Position: Defensive end

Personal information
- Born: October 9, 1949 (age 77); Seattle, Washington, U.S.
- Listed height: 6 ft 6 in (1.98 m)
- Listed weight: 255 lb (116 kg)

Career information
- High school: Blair (CA)
- College: Pasadena City College; San Diego State
- NFL draft: 1972: 4th round, 84th overall pick

Career history
- St. Louis Cardinals (1972); Washington Redskins (1974); New England Patriots (1975); Denver Broncos (1976)

Career NFL statistics
- Games played: 32
- Games started: 3
- Fumble recoveries: 2
- Stats at Pro Football Reference

Martin Carl Imhof (born October 9, 1949) is an American former professional football player who was a defensive end in the National Football League (NFL) for the St. Louis Cardinals, Washington Redskins, New England Patriots, and Denver Broncos. He played college football for the San Diego State Aztecs and was selected 84th overall in the fourth round of the 1972 NFL draft.
