= 1971 Gator Bowl (December) =

American college football game

| Georgia Bulldogs | North Carolina Tar Heels |
| (10–1) | (9–2) |
| SEC | ACC |
| 7 | 3 |
| Head coach: Vince Dooley | Head coach: Bill Dooley |
| AP / Coaches; 6 / 8 | AP / Coaches; NR / 18 |
| | 1 | 2 | 3 | 4 | Total |
|---|---|---|---|---|---|
| Georgia | 0 | 0 | 7 | 0 | 7 |
| North Carolina | 0 | 0 | 3 | 0 | 3 |
- Date: December 31, 1971
- Season: 1971
- Stadium: Gator Bowl Stadium
- Location: Jacksonville, Florida
- MVP: Jimmy Poulos (TB, Georgia) & James Webster (LB, North Carolina)
- Referee: Pat McHugh (SEC; split crew: SEC, ACC)
- Attendance: 71,208

The 1971 Gator Bowl (December) was a college football postseason bowl game that featured the Georgia Bulldogs and the North Carolina Tar Heels.

== Background ==
In the battle between the Dooley brothers was a finely balanced match up of a team that had only lost one game (#7 Auburn) which had cost them a Southeastern Conference title and an Atlantic Coast Conference champion that hadn't lost a conference game. This was Georgia's first Gator Bowl since 1948 and North Carolina's first since 1963. Altogether, the match was also called the "Dooley Bowl".

== Game summary ==
The third quarter proved to be the most crucial part of a game dominated by defense. The Tar Heels took the lead on a Craven 35 yard field goal with nine minutes left in the quarter. But the Bulldogs drove 80 yards down the field on the following possession, culminated with a 25-yard run by Jimmy Poulos with 1:39 left in the quarter to give Georgia the go-ahead touchdown. Poulus went for 161 yards on 20 carries, in an MVP effort. North Carolina was limited to under 200 yards.

== Aftermath ==
Georgia returned in 1989. The Tar Heels would win the ACC title the following year, advancing to the Sun Bowl. They returned to the Gator Bowl in 1979. The two teams met again at the 2016 Chick-fil-A Kickoff Game where Georgia beat the Tar Heels, 33 to 24.

== Statistics ==
| Statistics | Georgia | North Carolina |
|---|---|---|
| First downs | 13 | 9 |
| Rushing yards | 228 | 115 |
| Passing yards | 84 | 66 |
| Total yards | 312 | 181 |
| Interceptions thrown | 0 | 1 |
| Return yardage | 61 | 51 |
| Fumbles–lost | 2/1 | 2/1 |
| Punts–average | 10–34.8 | 10–46.6 |
| Yards penalized | 5–29 | 3–15 |
