= 1971 South Carolina Gamecocks football team =

American college football season

1971 South Carolina Gamecocks football
- Conference: Independent
- Record: 6–5
- Head coach: Paul Dietzel (6th season)
- Captain: Dickie Harris
- Home stadium: Carolina Stadium

1971 NCAA University Division independents football records
	Conf.			Overall
Team	W	L	T	W		L		T
No. 5 Penn State		–		11	–	1	–	0
Boston College		–		9	–	2	–	0
No. 17 Houston		–		9	–	3	–	0
No. 13 Notre Dame		–		8	–	2	–	0
Utah State		–		8	–	3	–	0
Florida State		–		8	–	4	–	0
Cincinnati		–		7	–	4	–	0
West Virginia		–		7	–	4	–	0
Temple		–		6	–	2	–	1
Air Force		–		6	–	4	–	0
Army		–		6	–	4	–	0
Colgate		–		6	–	4	–	0
Villanova		–		6	–	4	–	1
South Carolina		–		6	–	5	–	0
Southern Miss		–		6	–	5	–	0
Georgia Tech		–		6	–	6	–	0
Northern Illinois		–		5	–	5	–	1
Syracuse		–		5	–	5	–	1
Dayton		–		5	–	6	–	0
Holy Cross		–		4	–	6	–	0
Miami (FL)		–		4	–	7	–	0
Rutgers		–		4	–	7	–	0
Virginia Tech		–		4	–	7	–	0
Navy		–		3	–	8	–	0
Pittsburgh		–		3	–	8	–	0
Tulane		–		3	–	8	–	0
Marshall		–		2	–	8	–	0
Xavier		–		1	–	9	–	0
Rankings from AP Poll

The 1971 South Carolina Gamecocks football team represented the University of South Carolina as an independent in the 1971 NCAA University Division football season. Led by sixth-year head coach Paul Dietzel, the Gamecocks compiled a record of 6–5. The team played home games at Carolina Stadium in Columbia, South Carolina.

After competing in the Atlantic Coast Conference (ACC) from its founding in 1953 through the spring of 1971, South Carolina withdrew due to a disagreement with the ACC's desire to strengthen its academic requirements. Six of the seven remaining ACC members honored their contracts with the Gamecocks, but North Carolina did not.

== Schedule ==
Date	Opponent	Rank	Site	Result	Attendance	Source
September 11	No. 17 Georgia Tech		Carolina Stadium; Columbia, SC	W 24–7	54,842	
September 18	at Duke	No. 19	Wallace Wade Stadium; Durham, NC	L 12–28	35,113	
September 25	NC State		Carolina Stadium; Columbia, SC	W 24–6	48,315	
October 2	at Memphis State		Memphis Memorial Stadium; Memphis, TN	W 7–3	20,666	
October 9	Virginia		Carolina Stadium; Columbia, SC	W 34–14	43,861	
October 16	Maryland		Carolina Stadium; Columbia, SC	W 35–6	45,653	
October 23	at Florida State		Doak Campbell Stadium; Tallahassee, FL	L 18–49	30,764	
October 30	No. 7 Georgia		Carolina Stadium; Columbia, SC (rivalry)	L 0–24	54,613	
November 6	at No. 11 Tennessee		Neyland Stadium; Knoxville, TN (rivalry)	L 6–35	63,509	
November 20	Wake Forest		Carolina Stadium; Columbia, SC	W 24–7	43,285	
November 27	Clemson		Carolina Stadium; Columbia, SC (rivalry)	L 7–17	57,242	
Rankings from AP Poll released prior to the game

== Roster ==
1971 South Carolina Gamecocks football team roster
Players
Coaches
Offense

Pos.	#	Name	Class
OT	70	Darrell Austin	So
WR	90	Howard Barfield	Jr
WR	82	Greg Black	Jr
WR	7	Jackie Brown	Sr
OT	73	Dave Cash	So
QB	12	Robbie Davis	So
RB	39	Mark DeCamilla	So
G	62	Dennis Ford	Sr
TE	83	Billy Freeman	Sr
WR	80	Mike Haggard	Jr
RB	44	Carlton Haywood	So
RB	23	Charlie Jetton	Jr
RB	36	Chuck Mimms	Jr
WR	20	Jim Mitchell	Sr
QB	17	Glenn Morris	Jr
G	61	Richie Moye	Sr
QB	10	Tommy Rhodes	Jr
RB	30	Billy Ray Rice	Sr
RB		Fred Robinson
RB	34	Tommy Simmons	Sr
C	54	Steve Wade	Jr
TE	16	Marty Woolbright	So
QB	15	Jackie Young	Jr

Defense

Pos.	#	Name	Class
LB	92	Rick Brown	Jr
LB	47	Gregg Crabb	Sr
DB	18	Bo Davies	Sr
DB	43	Dickie Harris	Sr
DB	11	Tyler Hellams	Sr
DL	52	Pat Kohout	Sr
DT	67	John LeHeup	Jr
DE	81	Monty Matthews	So
DB	3	Jimmy Nash	Sr
DT	68	Joe Regalis	Sr
DL	49	Bob Rose	So
DB	22	Thad Rowe	So
DT	89	Mark Stirling	Sr
LB	25	Phil Wallace	Jr

Special teams

Pos.	#	Name	Class
K	2	Tommy Bell	Jr
P	4	Robbie Reynolds	Sr

Head coach

- Paul Dietzel

Coordinators/assistant coaches

Legend

- (C) Team captain
- (S) Suspended
- (I) Ineligible
- Injured
- Redshirt
