= Al Michaels (disambiguation) =

Al Michaels (born 1944) is an American television sportscaster

Al Michaels may also refer to:

- Al Michaels (running back) (1900–1972), American football running back
- Al Michaels (American football coach) (1911–1991), head coach of the North Carolina State football team in 1971
