= Eddie Robinson Coach of the Year Award =

American college football coach award

- Awarded for: Best college football coach in Division I
- Location: Grambling, Louisiana
- Country: United States
- Presented by: Football Writers Association of America

History
- First award: 1957
- Most recent: Clark Lea, Vanderbilt
- Website: Official website

The Eddie Robinson Coach of the Year Award is given annually to a college football coach by the Football Writers Association of America. The award honors Eddie Robinson, former coach at Grambling State University.

== Winners ==
Year	Winner	Team
1957	Woody Hayes	Ohio State
1958	Paul Dietzel	LSU
1959	Ben Schwartzwalder	Syracuse
1960	Murray Warmath	Minnesota
1961	Darrell Royal	Texas
1962	John McKay	USC
1963	Darrell Royal	Texas (2)
1964	Ara Parseghian	Notre Dame
1965	Duffy Daugherty	Michigan State
1966	Tom Cahill	Army
1967	John Pont	Indiana
1968	Woody Hayes	Ohio State (2)
1969	Bo Schembechler	Michigan
1970	Alex Agase	Northwestern
1971	Bob Devaney	Nebraska
1972	John McKay	USC (2)
1973	Johnny Majors	Pittsburgh
1974	Grant Teaff	Baylor
1975	Woody Hayes	Ohio State (3)
1976	Johnny Majors	Pittsburgh (2)
1977	Lou Holtz	Arkansas
1978	Joe Paterno	Penn State
1979	Earle Bruce	Ohio State (4)
1980	Vince Dooley	Georgia
1981	Danny Ford	Clemson
1982	Joe Paterno	Penn State (2)
1983	Howard Schnellenberger	Miami (FL)
1984	LaVell Edwards	BYU
1985	Fisher DeBerry	Air Force
1986	Joe Paterno	Penn State (3)
1987	Dick MacPherson	Syracuse (2)
1988	Lou Holtz	Notre Dame (2)
1989	Bill McCartney	Colorado
1990	Bobby Ross	Georgia Tech
1991	Don James	Washington
1992	Gene Stallings	Alabama
1993	Terry Bowden	Auburn
1994	Rich Brooks	Oregon
1995	Gary Barnett	Northwestern (2)
1996	Bruce Snyder	Arizona State
1997	Mike Price	Washington State
1998	Phillip Fulmer	Tennessee
1999	Frank Beamer	Virginia Tech
2000	Bob Stoops	Oklahoma
2001	Ralph Friedgen	Maryland
2002	Jim Tressel	Ohio State (5)
2003	Nick Saban	LSU
2004	Urban Meyer	Utah
2005	Charlie Weis	Notre Dame (3)
2006	Greg Schiano	Rutgers
2007	Mark Mangino	Kansas
2008	Nick Saban	Alabama (2)
2009	Gary Patterson	TCU
2010	Chip Kelly	Oregon (2)
2011	Mike Gundy	Oklahoma State
2012	Brian Kelly	Notre Dame (4)
2013	Gus Malzahn	Auburn (2)
2014	Gary Patterson	TCU (2)
2015	Kirk Ferentz	Iowa
2016	Mike MacIntyre	Colorado (2)
2017	Scott Frost	UCF
2018	Bill Clark	UAB
2019	Ed Orgeron	LSU (2)
2020	Jamey Chadwell	Coastal Carolina
2021	Luke Fickell	Cincinnati
2022	Sonny Dykes	TCU (3)
2023	Kalen DeBoer	Washington
2024	Curt Cignetti	Indiana
2025	Clark Lea	Vanderbilt
