= 1971 Navy Midshipmen football team =

American college football season

1971 Navy Midshipmen football
- Conference: Independent
- Record: 3–8
- Head coach: Rick Forzano (3rd season)
- Captain: Rick Porterfield
- Home stadium: Navy–Marine Corps Memorial Stadium

1971 NCAA University Division independents football records
	Conf.			Overall
Team	W	L	T	W		L		T
No. 5 Penn State		–		11	–	1	–	0
Boston College		–		9	–	2	–	0
No. 17 Houston		–		9	–	3	–	0
No. 13 Notre Dame		–		8	–	2	–	0
Utah State		–		8	–	3	–	0
Florida State		–		8	–	4	–	0
Cincinnati		–		7	–	4	–	0
West Virginia		–		7	–	4	–	0
Temple		–		6	–	2	–	1
Air Force		–		6	–	4	–	0
Army		–		6	–	4	–	0
Colgate		–		6	–	4	–	0
Villanova		–		6	–	4	–	1
South Carolina		–		6	–	5	–	0
Southern Miss		–		6	–	5	–	0
Georgia Tech		–		6	–	6	–	0
Northern Illinois		–		5	–	5	–	1
Syracuse		–		5	–	5	–	1
Dayton		–		5	–	6	–	0
Holy Cross		–		4	–	6	–	0
Miami (FL)		–		4	–	7	–	0
Rutgers		–		4	–	7	–	0
Virginia Tech		–		4	–	7	–	0
Navy		–		3	–	8	–	0
Pittsburgh		–		3	–	8	–	0
Tulane		–		3	–	8	–	0
Marshall		–		2	–	8	–	0
Xavier		–		1	–	9	–	0
Rankings from AP Poll

The 1971 Navy Midshipmen football team represented the United States Naval Academy (USNA) as an independent during the 1971 NCAA University Division football season. The team was led by third-year head coach Rick Forzano.

== Schedule ==
Date	Time	Opponent	Site	Result	Attendance	Source
September 11	1:30 p.m.	at Virginia	Scott Stadium; Charlottesville, VA	W 10–6	23,500	
September 18	2:00 p.m.	No. 14 Penn State	Navy–Marine Corps Memorial Stadium; Annapolis, MD	L 3–56	26,855	
September 25	1:35 p.m.	at Boston College	Alumni Stadium; Chestnut Hill, MA	L 6–49	22,700	
October 2	1:30 p.m.	at No. 2 Michigan	Michigan Stadium; Ann Arbor, MI	L 0–46	68,168	
October 9	1:31 p.m.	at Pittsburgh	Pitt Stadium; Pittsburgh, PA	L 35–36	24,825	
October 15	8:15 p.m.	at Miami (FL)	Miami Orange Bowl; Miami, FL	L 16–31	26,728	
October 23	2:00 p.m.	No. 10 Duke^{†}	Navy–Marine Corps Memorial Stadium; Annapolis, MD	W 15–14	24,844	
October 30	1:30 p.m.	at No. 12 Notre Dame	Notre Dame Stadium; Notre Dame, IN (rivalry)	L 0–21	59,075	
November 6	2:00 p.m.	at Georgia Tech	Grant Field; Atlanta, GA	L 21–34	44,821	
November 13	1:30 p.m.	Syracuse^{†}	Navy–Marine Corps Memorial Stadium; Annapolis, MD	W 17–14	15,437	
November 27	1:25 p.m.	vs. Army	John F. Kennedy Stadium; Philadelphia, PA (Army–Navy Game)	L 23–24	97,047	
^{†}Homecoming; Rankings from AP Poll released prior to the game; All times are in Eastern time

== Roster ==
1971 Navy Midshipmen football team roster
Players
Coaches
Offense

Pos.	#	Name	Class
WR	25	Mick Barr	Sr
OT	73	Rich Been	Jr
RB	49	George Berry	Sr
QB	18	John Buttermore	Jr
WR	33	Bert Calland	So
RB	35	Don Canterna	Jr
RB	30	Larry Carello	Jr
WR	85	Jack Forde	Jr
QB		Al Glenny
RB	24	Dan Howard	So
G	62	Bob Johnson	Jr
C	54	Bob Leerberg	So
OT	52	Max Legg	So
OT	71	Len May	So
G	61	Randy Mikal	So
WR, P	10	Tom Moore	Sr
TE	84	Gary Nowak	Jr
TE	80	Steve Ogden	Jr
FB	38	Andy Pease	Jr
QB	15	Fred Stuvek	So
G	51	Bob Van Dine	Jr
WR	11	Larry Van Loan	So

Defense

Pos.	#	Name	Class
LB	34	Mike Behrent	Jr
DB	40	Tom Broderick	Jr
LB	58	Dan Driscoll	So
LB	79	Jim Garban	Jr
LB	68	Dave Higginbotham	So
DE	87	David Lucas	Jr
DL	83	Al Mayfield	Jr
DT	76	Glen Nardi	Jr
DT	77	Mike O'Shaugnessy	Jr
LB	88	Rick Porterfield	Sr
DB	45	Gary Rhoads	Jr
DB	47	Charley Robinson	So
DT	78	Steve Sammon	Jr
DB	16	Mark Schickner	Sr
LB	81	Bill Smyth	So
LB	67	John Sparaco	Jr
DB		Brad Stephan
DB	44	Pat Virtue	Jr
LB	69	Chuck Voith	Jr
DL	65	Bob Willard	Jr

Special teams

Pos.	#	Name	Class
K	42	Roger Lanning	Jr

Head coach

- Rick Forzano

Coordinators/assistant coaches

Legend

- (C) Team captain
- (S) Suspended
- (I) Ineligible
- Injured
- Redshirt

- Not listed (missing number/class/position): Don Canterna
