= 1971 Syracuse Orangemen football team =

American college football season

1971 Syracuse Orangemen football
- Conference: Independent
- Record: 5–5–1
- Head coach: Ben Schwartzwalder (23rd season)
- Captains: Joe Ehrmann; Dan Yochum
- Home stadium: Archbold Stadium

1971 NCAA University Division independents football records
	Conf.			Overall
Team	W	L	T	W		L		T
No. 5 Penn State		–		11	–	1	–	0
Boston College		–		9	–	2	–	0
No. 17 Houston		–		9	–	3	–	0
No. 13 Notre Dame		–		8	–	2	–	0
Utah State		–		8	–	3	–	0
Florida State		–		8	–	4	–	0
Cincinnati		–		7	–	4	–	0
West Virginia		–		7	–	4	–	0
Temple		–		6	–	2	–	1
Air Force		–		6	–	4	–	0
Army		–		6	–	4	–	0
Colgate		–		6	–	4	–	0
Villanova		–		6	–	4	–	1
South Carolina		–		6	–	5	–	0
Southern Miss		–		6	–	5	–	0
Georgia Tech		–		6	–	6	–	0
Northern Illinois		–		5	–	5	–	1
Syracuse		–		5	–	5	–	1
Dayton		–		5	–	6	–	0
Holy Cross		–		4	–	6	–	0
Miami (FL)		–		4	–	7	–	0
Rutgers		–		4	–	7	–	0
Virginia Tech		–		4	–	7	–	0
Navy		–		3	–	8	–	0
Pittsburgh		–		3	–	8	–	0
Tulane		–		3	–	8	–	0
Marshall		–		2	–	8	–	0
Xavier		–		1	–	9	–	0
Rankings from AP Poll

The 1971 Syracuse Orangemen football team represented Syracuse University as an independent during the 1971 NCAA University Division football season. The team was led by 23rd-year head coach Ben Schwartzwalder and played their home games at Archbold Stadium in Syracuse, New York. The team finished with a record of 5–5–1.

== Schedule ==
Date	Time	Opponent	Rank	Site	Result	Attendance	Source
September 18		Wisconsin	No. 15	Archbold Stadium; Syracuse, NY	T 20–20	31,602	
September 25		at Northwestern		Dyche Stadium; Evanston, IL	L 6–12	27,529	
October 2		at Indiana		Memorial Stadium; Bloomington, IN	W 7–0	31,989	
October 9		at Maryland		Byrd Stadium; College Park, MD	W 21–13	20,100	
October 16		No. 9 Penn State		Archbold Stadium; Syracuse, NY (rivalry)	L 0–31	41,382	
October 23		Holy Cross		Archbold Stadium; Syracuse, NY	W 63–21	18,308	
October 30		at Pittsburgh		Pitt Stadium; Pittsburgh, PA (rivalry)	L 21–31	24,497	
November 6		Boston College		Archbold Stadium; Syracuse, NY	L 3–10	21,978	
November 13	1:30 p.m.	at Navy		Navy–Marine Corps Memorial Stadium; Annapolis, MD	L 14–17	15,437	
November 20		West Virginia		Archbold Stadium; Syracuse, NY (rivalry)	W 28–24	18,049	
December 4	8:01 p.m.	at Miami (FL)		Miami Orange Bowl; Miami, FL	W 14–0	17,224	
Rankings from AP Poll released prior to the game; All times are in Eastern time

== Roster ==
1971 Syracuse Orangemen football team roster
Players
Coaches
Offense

Pos.	#	Name	Class
C	63	Doug Auld	Sr
RB	42	Bob Barlette	So
QB	26	Tom Bilko	So
TE	84	Dave Boyer	Sr
RB	14	Jerry Conicello	So
RB	86	Jim Cummings	Jr
RB	32	Mike DiMarco	So
FB	41	Dennis Finnegan	Sr
RB	18	Brian Hambleton	So
WR	80	Chris Hoornbeck	Jr
RB	36	Marty Januszkiewicz	Jr
OT	77	Ray Jarosz	Sr
QB	24	D. T. King	So
G	60	Dave Lapham	So
RB	46	Ron Page	So
RB	19	John Rosella	Jr
QB	15	Frank Ruggiero	Sr
QB	29	Chuck Smyrl	So
G	61	Ross Sposato	Jr
TE	87	Rick Steiner	Jr
WR	88	Gary Sweat	So
OT	71	Stan Walters	Sr
QB	23	Bob Woodruff	Jr
RB	16	Greg Wysocki	Sr
OT	74	Dan Yochum	Sr

Defense

Pos.	#	Name	Class
LB	33	Ken Bohannon	Sr
LB	55	Charles Boniti	Jr
DT	66	Len Campolieto	Jr
DE	81	Bill Coghill	Sr
DT	76	Joe Ehrmann	Sr
LB	50	Howard Goodman	Sr
DB	43	Robin Griffin	Sr
LB	38	D. A. King	Jr
DE	94	Steve Joslin	Jr
DL	68	Ted Lachowicz	Sr
DB	22	Kevin Morrissey	So
DB	12	Tom Myers	Sr
LB	58	Walter Sapp	Jr
DB	20	Ken Sawyer	So
DT	92	Joe Zegien	So
DE	97	Bob Zimmerman	Sr

Special teams

Pos.	#	Name	Class
K	11	Scott Robinson	Jr

Head coach

- Ben Schwartzwalder

Coordinators/assistant coaches

Legend

- (C) Team captain
- (S) Suspended
- (I) Ineligible
- Injured
- Redshirt

== First one-point safety ==
The first known occurrence of a one-point safety (conversion safety) was in an National Collegiate Athletic Association (NCAA) game on October 2, 1971, scored by Syracuse in the first quarter of a game at Indiana. On a point-after-touchdown kick, the ball was kicked almost straight up in the air. An Indiana player illegally batted the ball in the end zone (a spot foul defensive penalty). Syracuse won the game, 7–0. The 1970 rulebook (Rule 8-5-3) stated, "If a scrimmage kick fails to cross the neutral zone, or crosses the neutral zone and is first touched by Team B, or is untouched and then rebounds into the end zone where it is recovered by Team A, it is a safety," and (8-5-4) "If the penalty for a foul committed when the ball is free leaves the ball behind a goal line, it is a safety if behind the offender's goal line."
