= Tom Cahill (American football) =

American football player and coach (1919–1992)

Biographical details
- Born: October 11, 1919; Fayetteville, New York, U.S.
- Died: October 29, 1992 (aged 73); Schenectady, New York, U.S.

Playing career

Football
- c. 1940: Niagara

Coaching career (HC unless noted)

Football
- 1949–1956: The Manlius School (NY)
- 1957–1958: River Dell Regional HS (NJ)
- 1959–1965: Army (freshmen)
- 1966–1973: Army
- 1976–1979: Union (NY)

Baseball
- 1977–1978: Union (NY)

Head coaching record
- Overall: 51–59–3 (college football); 12–17 (college baseball)

Accomplishments and honors

Awards
- AFCA Coach of the Year (1966); Eddie Robinson Coach of the Year (1966)

Thomas B. Cahill (October 11, 1919 – October 29, 1992) was an American football player and coach who served as the head coach at the United States Military Academy from 1966 to 1973 and at Union College in Schenectady, New York, from 1976 to 1979, compiling a career college football record of 51–59–3.

During his tenure as head coach at Army, which coincided with the height of the Vietnam War, his teams beat Navy five times. Following the 1966 season, the Eddie Robinson Coach of the Year award was bestowed upon Cahill. Following a 51–0 defeat at the hands of Navy to conclude the 1973 season, Cahill was dismissed as head coach. Cahill died on October 29, 1992, in Schenectady after a heart attack.

== Head coaching record ==
=== College football ===
Year	Team	Overall	Conference	Standing	Bowl/playoffs
Army Cadets (NCAA University Division / Division I independent) (1966–1973)
1966	Army	8–2			
1967	Army	8–2			
1968	Army	7–3			
1969	Army	4–5–1			
1970	Army	1–9–1			
1971	Army	6–4			
1972	Army	6–4			
1973	Army	0–10			
Army:		40–39–2			
Union Dutchmen (New England Small College Athletic Conference) (1976)
1976	Union	3–5			
Union Dutchmen (NCAA Division III independent) (1977–1979)
1977	Union	2–5–1			
1978	Union	3–5			
1979	Union	3–5			
Union:		11–20–1			
Total:		51–59–3			
