= 1971 Miami Hurricanes football team =

American college football season

1971 Miami Hurricanes football
- Conference: Independent
- Record: 4–7
- Head coach: Fran Curci (1st season)
- MVP: Mike Riley
- Home stadium: Miami Orange Bowl

1971 NCAA University Division independents football records
| | Conf. | | | Overall |
| Team | W | L | T | W | | L | | T |
|---|---|---|---|---|---|---|---|---|
| No. 5 Penn State | | – | | 11 | – | 1 | – | 0 |
| Boston College | | – | | 9 | – | 2 | – | 0 |
| No. 17 Houston | | – | | 9 | – | 3 | – | 0 |
| No. 13 Notre Dame | | – | | 8 | – | 2 | – | 0 |
| Utah State | | – | | 8 | – | 3 | – | 0 |
| Florida State | | – | | 8 | – | 4 | – | 0 |
| Cincinnati | | – | | 7 | – | 4 | – | 0 |
| West Virginia | | – | | 7 | – | 4 | – | 0 |
| Temple | | – | | 6 | – | 2 | – | 1 |
| Air Force | | – | | 6 | – | 4 | – | 0 |
| Army | | – | | 6 | – | 4 | – | 0 |
| Colgate | | – | | 6 | – | 4 | – | 0 |
| Villanova | | – | | 6 | – | 4 | – | 1 |
| South Carolina | | – | | 6 | – | 5 | – | 0 |
| Southern Miss | | – | | 6 | – | 5 | – | 0 |
| Georgia Tech | | – | | 6 | – | 6 | – | 0 |
| Northern Illinois | | – | | 5 | – | 5 | – | 1 |
| Syracuse | | – | | 5 | – | 5 | – | 1 |
| Dayton | | – | | 5 | – | 6 | – | 0 |
| Holy Cross | | – | | 4 | – | 6 | – | 0 |
| Miami (FL) | | – | | 4 | – | 7 | – | 0 |
| Rutgers | | – | | 4 | – | 7 | – | 0 |
| Virginia Tech | | – | | 4 | – | 7 | – | 0 |
| Navy | | – | | 3 | – | 8 | – | 0 |
| Pittsburgh | | – | | 3 | – | 8 | – | 0 |
| Tulane | | – | | 3 | – | 8 | – | 0 |
| Marshall | | – | | 2 | – | 8 | – | 0 |
| Xavier | | – | | 1 | – | 9 | – | 0 |
Rankings from AP Poll

The 1971 Miami Hurricanes football team represented the University of Miami as an independent during the 1971 NCAA University Division football season. Led by first-year head coach Fran Curci, the Hurricanes played their home games at the Miami Orange Bowl in Miami, Florida. Miami finished the season with a record of 4–7.

== Schedule ==
| Date | Time | Opponent | Site | TV | Result | Attendance | Source |
|---|---|---|---|---|---|---|---|
| September 18 | 1:52 p.m. | Florida State | Miami Orange Bowl; Miami, FL (rivalry) | ABC | L 17–20 | 20,266 | |
| September 25 | | at Wake Forest | Groves Stadium; Winston-Salem, NC | | W 29–10 | 24,500 | |
| October 1 | 8:14 p.m. | Baylor | Miami Orange Bowl; Miami, FL | | W 41–15 | 26,876 | |
| October 9 | 8:15 p.m. | No. 7 Notre Dame | Miami Orange Bowl; Miami, FL (rivalry) | | L 0–17 | 64,357 | |
| October 15 | 8:15 p.m. | Navy | Miami Orange Bowl; Miami, FL | | W 31–16 | 26,728 | |
| October 29 | 8:15 p.m. | Army | Miami Orange Bowl; Miami, FL | | W 24–13 | 24,323 | |
| November 5 | | NC State | Miami Orange Bowl; Miami, FL | | L 7–13 | 19,228 | |
| November 13 | | at No. 4 Alabama | Denny Stadium; Tuscaloosa, AL | | L 3–31 | 57,313 | |
| November 20 | 8:30 p.m. | at No. 16 Houston | Houston Astrodome; Houston, TX | | L 6–27 | 29,276 | |
| November 27 | | Florida | Miami Orange Bowl; Miami, FL (rivalry) | | L 16–45 | 37,710 | |
| December 4 | 8:01 p.m. | Syracuse | Miami Orange Bowl; Miami, FL | | L 6–17 | 17,224 | |
Rankings from AP Poll released prior to the game; All times are in Eastern time

== Personnel ==
1971 Miami Hurricanes football team roster
| Players | | | Coaches |
|---|---|---|---|
| Offense: Pos. / # / Name / Class; QB / 12 / John Hornibrook | Defense: Pos. / # / Name / Class | Special teams: Pos. / # / Name / Class | Head coach: Fran Curci; Coordinators/assistant coaches Legend: (C) Team captain; (S) Suspended; (I) Ineligible; Injured; Redshirt |
