= 1971 Wake Forest Demon Deacons football team =

American college football season

1971 Wake Forest Demon Deacons football
- Conference: Atlantic Coast Conference
- Record: 6–5 (2–3 ACC)
- Head coach: Cal Stoll (3rd season)
- Captain: Game captains
- Home stadium: Groves Stadium

1971 Atlantic Coast Conference football standings
	Conf.					Overall
Team	W		L		T	W		L		T
North Carolina $	6	–	0	–	0	9	–	3	–	0
Clemson	4	–	2	–	0	5	–	6	–	0
Duke	2	–	3	–	0	6	–	5	–	0
Wake Forest	2	–	3	–	0	6	–	5	–	0
Virginia	2	–	3	–	0	3	–	8	–	0
NC State	2	–	4	–	0	3	–	8	–	0
Maryland	1	–	4	–	0	2	–	9	–	0
$ – Conference champion; Rankings from AP Poll

The 1971 Wake Forest Demon Deacons football team was an American football team that represented Wake Forest University during the 1971 NCAA University Division football season. In their third season under head coach Cal Stoll, the Demon Deacons compiled a 6–5 record and finished in a tie for third place in the Atlantic Coast Conference.

== Schedule ==
Date	Opponent	Site	Result	Attendance	Source
September 11	Davidson*	Groves Stadium; Winston-Salem, NC	W 27–7	19,500	
September 18	at Virginia Tech*	Lane Stadium; Blacksburg, VA	W 20–9	28,000	
September 25	Miami (FL)*	Groves Stadium; Winston-Salem, NC	L 10–29	24,500	
October 2	at Maryland	Byrd Stadium; College Park, MD	W 18–14	16,200	
October 9	at NC State	Carter Stadium; Raleigh, NC (rivalry)	L 14–21	25,300	
October 16	Tulsa*	Groves Stadium; Winston-Salem, NC	W 51–21	18,700	
October 23	at North Carolina	Kenan Memorial Stadium; Chapel Hill, NC (rivalry)	L 3–7	44,000	
October 30	at Clemson	Memorial Stadium; Clemson, SC	L 9–10	34,000	
November 6	William & Mary*	Groves Stadium; Winston-Salem, NC	W 36–29	19,000	
November 13	Duke	Groves Stadium; Winston-Salem, NC (rivalry)	W 23–7	32,000	
November 20	at South Carolina*	Carolina Stadium; Columbia, SC	L 7–24	43,285	
*Non-conference game

== Roster ==
1971 Wake Forest Demon Deacons football team roster
Players			Coaches
Offense: Pos. / # / Name / Class; QB / 5 / Larry Russell	Defense: Pos. / # / Name / Class; LB / 56 / Ed Bradley / Sr	Special teams: Pos. / # / Name / Class	Head coach: Cal Stoll; Coordinators/assistant coaches Legend: (C) Team captain; (S) Suspended; (I) Ineligible; Injured; Redshirt

== Team leaders ==
Category	Team Leader	Att/Cth	Yds
Passing	Larry Russell	29/73	290
Rushing	Larry Hopkins	249	1,228
Receiving	Dave Doda	6	31
