= 1971 NC State Wolfpack football team =

American college football season

1971 NC State Wolfpack football
- Conference: Atlantic Coast Conference
- Record: 3–8 (2–4 ACC)
- Head coach: Al Michaels (1st season)
- Home stadium: Carter Stadium

1971 Atlantic Coast Conference football standings
	Conf.					Overall
Team	W		L		T	W		L		T
North Carolina $	6	–	0	–	0	9	–	3	–	0
Clemson	4	–	2	–	0	5	–	6	–	0
Duke	2	–	3	–	0	6	–	5	–	0
Wake Forest	2	–	3	–	0	6	–	5	–	0
Virginia	2	–	3	–	0	3	–	8	–	0
NC State	2	–	4	–	0	3	–	8	–	0
Maryland	1	–	4	–	0	2	–	9	–	0
$ – Conference champion; Rankings from AP Poll

The 1971 NC State Wolfpack football team represented North Carolina State University during the 1971 NCAA University Division football season. The Wolfpack were led by first-year head coach Al Michaels and played their home games at Carter Stadium in Raleigh, North Carolina. The team competed as members of the Atlantic Coast Conference, finishing in sixth.

Michaels had been the defensive coordinator for the Wolfpack under Earle Edwards, and served as the interim coach after his retirement. Lou Holtz was hired as permanent coach shortly after the end of the season, and Michaels returned to the defensive coordinator position under Holtz.

== Schedule ==
Date	Time	Opponent	Site	Result	Attendance	Source
September 11	7:30 p.m.	Kent State*	Carter Stadium; Raleigh, NC	L 21–23	24,300	
September 18		at Maryland	Byrd Stadium; College Park, MD	L 7–35	16,500	
September 25		at South Carolina*	Carolina Stadium; Columbia, SC	L 6–24	48,315	
October 2		No. 20 North Carolina	Carter Stadium; Raleigh, NC (rivalry)	L 7–27	35,000	
October 9		Wake Forest	Carter Stadium; Raleigh, NC (rivalry)	W 21–14	25,300	
October 16		at Duke	Wallace Wade Stadium; Durham, NC (rivalry)	L 13–41	28,174	
October 23		East Carolina*	Carter Stadium; Raleigh, NC (rivalry)	L 15–31	18,000	
October 30		Virginia	Carter Stadium; Raleigh, NC	L 10–14	21,600	
November 5		at Miami (FL)*	Miami Orange Bowl; Miami, FL	W 13–7	19,028–19,228	
November 13		at No. 5 Penn State*	Beaver Stadium; University Park, PA	L 3–35	50,477	
November 20		at Clemson	Memorial Stadium; Clemson, SC (rivalry)	W 31–23	28,000	
*Non-conference game; Rankings from AP Poll released prior to the game; All times are in Eastern time
