= 1971 Maryland Terrapins football team =

American college football season

1971 Maryland Terrapins football
- Conference: Atlantic Coast Conference
- Record: 2–9 (1–5 ACC)
- Head coach: Roy Lester (3rd season)
- Home stadium: Byrd Stadium

1971 Atlantic Coast Conference football standings
	Conf.					Overall
Team	W		L		T	W		L		T
North Carolina $	6	–	0	–	0	9	–	3	–	0
Clemson	4	–	2	–	0	5	–	6	–	0
Duke	2	–	3	–	0	6	–	5	–	0
Wake Forest	2	–	3	–	0	6	–	5	–	0
Virginia	2	–	3	–	0	3	–	8	–	0
NC State	2	–	4	–	0	3	–	8	–	0
Maryland	1	–	4	–	0	2	–	9	–	0
$ – Conference champion; Rankings from AP Poll

The 1971 Maryland Terrapins football team represented the University of Maryland in the 1971 NCAA University Division football season. In their third season under head coach Roy Lester, the Terrapins compiled a 2–9 record (1–5 in conference), finished in last place in the Atlantic Coast Conference, and were outscored by their opponents 283 to 224. The team's statistical leaders included Al Neville with 1,275 passing yards, Monte Hinkle with 457 rushing yards, and Dan Bungori with 490 receiving yards.

== Schedule ==
Date	Time	Opponent	Site	Result	Attendance	Source
September 11	2:00 p.m.	Villanova*	Byrd Stadium; College Park, MD	L 13–28	22,600	
September 18		NC State	Byrd Stadium; College Park, MD	W 35–7	16,500	
September 25		at North Carolina	Kenan Memorial Stadium; Chapel Hill, NC	L 14–35	43,000	
October 2		Wake Forest	Byrd Stadium; College Park, MD	L 14–18	16,200	
October 9		Syracuse*	Byrd Stadium; College Park, MD	L 13–21	20,100	
October 16		at South Carolina*	Carolina Stadium; Columbia, SC	L 6–35	45,653	
October 23		at Florida*	Florida Field; Gainesville, FL	L 23–27	53,021	
October 30		VMI*	Byrd Stadium; College Park, MD	W 38–0	22,300	
November 6		at No. 6 Penn State*	Beaver Stadium; University Park, PA (rivalry)	L 27–63	50,144	
November 13		at Clemson	Memorial Stadium; Clemson, SC	L 14–20	25,000	
November 20		Virginia	Byrd Stadium; College Park, MD (rivalry)	L 27–29	12,600	
*Non-conference game; Rankings from AP Poll released prior to the game; All times are in Eastern time

== Roster ==
1971 Maryland Terrapins football team roster
Players
Coaches
Offense

Pos.	#	Name	Class
QB	17	Will Morris	Sr
QB	2	Jeff Shugars	Sr

Defense

Pos.	#	Name	Class
DT	74	Steve Dawson	So
WR	22	Larry Marshall	Sr
DE	71	Guy Roberts	Sr

Special teams

Pos.	#	Name	Class

Head coach

- Roy Lester

Coordinators/assistant coaches

Legend

- (C) Team captain
- (S) Suspended
- (I) Ineligible
- Injured
- Redshirt
