= 1971 Southern Miss Southerners football team =

American college football season

1971 Southern Miss Southerners football
- Conference: Independent
- Record: 6–5
- Head coach: P. W. Underwood (3rd season)
- Home stadium: Faulkner Field

1971 NCAA University Division independents football records
	Conf.			Overall
Team	W	L	T	W		L		T
No. 5 Penn State		–		11	–	1	–	0
Boston College		–		9	–	2	–	0
No. 17 Houston		–		9	–	3	–	0
No. 13 Notre Dame		–		8	–	2	–	0
Utah State		–		8	–	3	–	0
Florida State		–		8	–	4	–	0
Cincinnati		–		7	–	4	–	0
West Virginia		–		7	–	4	–	0
Temple		–		6	–	2	–	1
Air Force		–		6	–	4	–	0
Army		–		6	–	4	–	0
Colgate		–		6	–	4	–	0
Villanova		–		6	–	4	–	1
South Carolina		–		6	–	5	–	0
Southern Miss		–		6	–	5	–	0
Georgia Tech		–		6	–	6	–	0
Northern Illinois		–		5	–	5	–	1
Syracuse		–		5	–	5	–	1
Dayton		–		5	–	6	–	0
Holy Cross		–		4	–	6	–	0
Miami (FL)		–		4	–	7	–	0
Rutgers		–		4	–	7	–	0
Virginia Tech		–		4	–	7	–	0
Navy		–		3	–	8	–	0
Pittsburgh		–		3	–	8	–	0
Tulane		–		3	–	8	–	0
Marshall		–		2	–	8	–	0
Xavier		–		1	–	9	–	0
Rankings from AP Poll

The 1971 Southern Miss Southerners football team was an American football team that represented the University of Southern Mississippi as an independent during the 1971 NCAA University Division football season. In their third year under head coach P. W. Underwood, the team compiled a 6–5 record.

== Schedule ==
Date	Opponent	Site	Result	Attendance	Source
September 11	vs. Florida State	Ladd Stadium; Mobile, AL	L 9–24	12,133	
September 18	at No. 9 Alabama	Denny Stadium; Tuscaloosa, AL	L 6–42	52,701	
September 25	San Diego State	Mississippi Veterans Memorial Stadium; Jackson, MS	W 10–0	11,157	
October 9	at No. 4 Auburn	Cliff Hare Stadium; Auburn, AL	L 14–27	42,000	
October 16	at Ole Miss	Hemingway Stadium; Oxford, MS	L 6–20	23,200	
October 23	at Memphis State	Memphis Memorial Stadium; Memphis, TN (rivalry)	L 12–27	19,494	
October 30	Richmond	Faulkner Field; Hattiesburg, MS	W 31–24	10,000	
November 6	VMI^{†}	Faulkner Field; Hattiesburg, MS	W 38–0	12,400	
November 13	at Louisiana Tech	Louisiana Tech Stadium; Ruston, LA (rivalry)	W 24–20	16,000	
November 20	at Virginia Tech	Lane Stadium; Blacksburg, VA	W 17–8	22,000	
November 27	West Texas State	Faulkner Field; Hattiesburg, MS	W 10–9	5,300	
^{†}Homecoming; Rankings from AP Poll released prior to the game
