= 1971 Army Cadets football team =

American college football season

1971 Army Cadets football
- Conference: Independent
- Record: 6–4
- Head coach: Tom Cahill (6th season)
- Defensive coordinator: Richard S. Lyon (5th season)
- Captain: John Roth
- Home stadium: Michie Stadium

1971 NCAA University Division independents football records
	Conf.			Overall
Team	W	L	T	W		L		T
No. 5 Penn State		–		11	–	1	–	0
Boston College		–		9	–	2	–	0
No. 17 Houston		–		9	–	3	–	0
No. 13 Notre Dame		–		8	–	2	–	0
Utah State		–		8	–	3	–	0
Florida State		–		8	–	4	–	0
Cincinnati		–		7	–	4	–	0
West Virginia		–		7	–	4	–	0
Temple		–		6	–	2	–	1
Air Force		–		6	–	4	–	0
Army		–		6	–	4	–	0
Colgate		–		6	–	4	–	0
Villanova		–		6	–	4	–	1
South Carolina		–		6	–	5	–	0
Southern Miss		–		6	–	5	–	0
Georgia Tech		–		6	–	6	–	0
Northern Illinois		–		5	–	5	–	1
Syracuse		–		5	–	5	–	1
Dayton		–		5	–	6	–	0
Holy Cross		–		4	–	6	–	0
Miami (FL)		–		4	–	7	–	0
Rutgers		–		4	–	7	–	0
Virginia Tech		–		4	–	7	–	0
Navy		–		3	–	8	–	0
Pittsburgh		–		3	–	8	–	0
Tulane		–		3	–	8	–	0
Marshall		–		2	–	8	–	0
Xavier		–		1	–	9	–	0
Rankings from AP Poll

The 1971 Army Cadets football team represented the United States Military Academy as an independent during the 1971 NCAA University Division football season. In their sixth year under head coach Tom Cahill, the Cadets compiled a 6–4 record but were outscored by their opponents by a combined total of 206 to 146. In the annual Army–Navy Game, the Cadets defeated the Midshipmen by a 24 to 23 score.

No Army players were selected as first-team players on the 1971 College Football All-America Team.

== Schedule ==
Date	Time	Opponent	Site	Result	Attendance	Source
September 18	2:00 p.m.	No. 13 Stanford	Michie Stadium; West Point, NY	L 3–38	42,148	
September 25	2:00 p.m.	at Georgia Tech	Grant Field; Atlanta, GA	W 16–13	40,123	
October 2	2:00 p.m.	Missouri	Michie Stadium; West Point, NY	W 22–6	43,503	
October 9	1:30 p.m.	at No. 9 Penn State	Beaver Stadium; University Park, PA	L 0–42	49,887	
October 16		at Air Force	Falcon Stadium; Colorado Springs, CO (rivalry)	L 7–20	44,802	
October 23	2:00 p.m.	Virginia	Michie Stadium; West Point, NY	W 14–9	42,535	
October 29	8:15 p.m.	at Miami (FL)	Miami Orange Bowl; Miami, FL	L 13–24	24,323	
November 6	1:30 p.m.	Rutgers	Michie Stadium; West Point, NY	W 30–17	39,841	
November 13	1:29 p.m.	Pittsburgh	Michie Stadium; West Point, NY	W 17–14	38,559	
November 27	1:25 p.m.	vs. Navy	John F. Kennedy Stadium; Philadelphia, PA (Army–Navy Game)	W 24–23	97,047	
Rankings from AP Poll released prior to the game; All times are in Eastern time

== Game summaries ==
=== at Georgia Tech ===
External videos
- 1971 Army at Georgia Tech – highlights

=== Navy ===
Army Cadets vs. Navy Midshipmen

Quarter	1	2	3	4	Total
Navy	0	14	7	2	23
Army	16	0	0	8	24

at JFK Stadium • Philadelphia, Pennsylvania

- Date: November 27
- Game weather: Rain
- Game attendance: 97,047
- Referee: Tom Sullivan
- TV announcers (ABC): Keith Jackson and Lee Grosscup
- New York Times

Game information

Navy

- George Berry
  19 Rush, 125 Yds
- Steve Ogden
  5 Rec, 65 Yds

Army

Scoring summary

Quarter	Time	Drive			Team	Scoring information	Score	
Quarter	Time	Plays	Yards	TOP	Team	Scoring information	NAVY	ARMY
1					Army	42-yard field goal by Jim Barclay	0	3
1	6:49	4			Army	Bob Hines 4-yard touchdown run, Jim Barclay kick good	0	10
1					Army	Bob Hines 4-yard touchdown reception from Kingsley Fink, 2-point pass failed	0	16
2		13	48		Navy	Fred Stuvek 5-yard touchdown run, Roger Lanning kick good	7	16
2		7	68		Navy	Fred Stuvek 1-yard touchdown run, Roger Lanning kick good	14	16
3	8:37	13	69		Navy	Steve Ogden 12-yard touchdown reception from Fred Stuvek, Roger Lanning kick good	21	16
4	10:11	6	30		Army	Ed Francis 3-yard touchdown reception from Kingsley Fink, 2-point pass good	21	24
4					Navy	Safety, Roger Danhof intentionally downed in end zone	23	24
"TOP" = time of possession. For other American football terms, see Glossary of American football.							23	24

== Roster ==
1971 Army Cadets football team roster
Players
Coaches
Offense

Pos.	#	Name	Class
QB		Kingsley Fink	So
WR		Ed Francis	Jr
RB		Bob Hines
		Greg McMuckin
TE		David Sanders	Sr
		John Simar

Defense

Pos.	#	Name	Class
DE	86	Steve Bogosian	Jr
LB	65	Pete Bucha
LB	56	Don MacLaren
LB	50	Jim Silva
LB	80	Bob Jarrell	Sr
		Randy Stein

Special teams

Pos.	#	Name	Class
K		Jim Barclay	So
P		Ron Danhof

Head coach

- Tom Cahill

Coordinators/assistant coaches

Legend

- (C) Team captain
- (S) Suspended
- (I) Ineligible
- Injured
- Redshirt

- Not listed (missing number/class/position): Bill Barker, Mike Gaines, Bob Jarrell
