= 1971 Peach Bowl =

American college football game

- 4th Peach Bowl
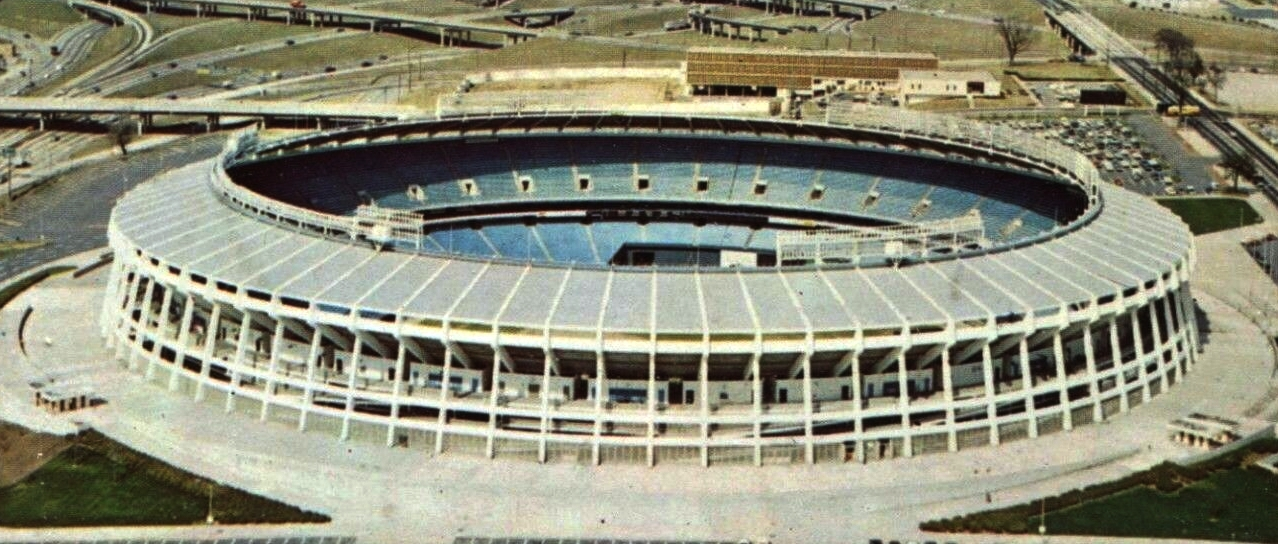
- Atlanta–Fulton County Stadium in Atlanta, Georgia, hosted the Peach Bowl.
Ole Miss Rebels	Georgia Tech Yellow Jackets
(9–2)	(6–5)
SEC	Independent
41	18
Head coach: Billy Kinard	Head coach: Bud Carson
AP / Coaches; 17 / 20
	1	2	3	4	Total
Ole Miss	10	28	0	3	41
Georgia Tech	0	6	6	6	18
- Date: December 30, 1971
- Season: 1971
- Stadium: Atlanta Stadium
- Location: Atlanta, Georgia
- MVP: QB Norris Weese; LB Crowell Armstrong
- Referee: Jimmy Harper (SEC)
- Attendance: 38,599

The 1971 Peach Bowl was a college football bowl game between the Ole Miss Rebels and the Georgia Tech Yellow Jackets.

== Background ==
This was the 15th straight season of postseason play for the Rebels, who tied for fourth in the Southeastern Conference (SEC). The independent Yellow Jackets were playing their last game under coach Bud Carson, while competing in their second straight bowl game. This was the first Peach Bowl played at Atlanta Stadium after the first three were played at Georgia Tech's Grant Field. Unfortunately, the field turned soggy prior to the game, getting worse as the game progressed.

This was the last college football game to feature an all-white team due to racial segregation. Ole Miss and SEC rival LSU each suited up their first black varsity players in 1972. LSU won the Sun Bowl over Iowa State 12 days prior to this contest.

== Game summary ==
The Rebels scored 38 straight points in the first half, starting with Norris Weese's touchdown run. Porter added in two touchdown runs, and touchdown passes from Lyons and Weese as the Yellow Jackets could not respond until the first half was almost over, on a Bill Healy run. Georgia Tech scored once more on another Healy run to make it 38–12. Ole Miss only scored once in the half on Hinton's second field goal, but Georgia Tech only scored once more as well on Healy's third touchdown run as Ole Miss stymied the Yellow Jackets, forcing three turnovers. Weese threw 7-of-14 for 116 yards along with 32 yards on 11 carries. Greg Ainsworth rushed for 119 yards on 28 carries.

=== Scoring summary ===
- Ole Miss – Weese 1 run (Hinton PAT)
- Ole Miss – Hinton 25 FG
- Ole Miss – Porter 2 run (Hinton PAT)
- Ole Miss – Porter 10 run (Hinton PAT)
- Ole Miss – Felts 15 pass from Lyons (Hinton PAT)
- Ole Miss – Myers 11 pass from Weese (Hinton PAT)
- Georgia Tech – Healy 2 run (Run failed)
- Georgia Tech – Healy 1 run (Pass failed)
- Ole Miss – Hinton 30 FG
- Georgia Tech – Healy 1 run (Run failed)

== Aftermath ==
As it turned out, this was the last bowl season for the Rebels until 1983. Georgia Tech reached a bowl the following year, and returned to the Peach Bowl in 1978, losing to Purdue. The Yellow Jackets are 0–4 in the Peach/Chick-fil-A Bowl, also losing in 2000 and 2008 to LSU.

Poor field conditions plagued nearly every Peach Bowl contested at Atlanta Stadium (renamed Atlanta-Fulton County Stadium in 1974), thanks to the wear and tear of full seasons of Braves baseball and Falcons football. The game moved indoors to the Georgia Dome in January 1993, and later to the retractable-roofed Mercedes-Benz Stadium in December 2017.

== Statistics ==
Statistics	Ole Miss	Georgia Tech
First downs	17	16
Rushing yards	79	166
Passing yards	139	151
Total yards	318	317
Passing C-A-I	9–18–0	13–26–0
Punts–avg.	5–37.4	5–31.2
Fumbles–lost	2–1	3–3
Penalties–yards	5–25	8–38
