= 1971 Rutgers Scarlet Knights football team =

American college football season

1971 Rutgers Scarlet Knights football
- Conference: Independent
- Record: 4–7
- Head coach: John F. Bateman (12th season)
- Captains: William Donaldson; Sam Picketts; Larry Robertson
- Home stadium: Rutgers Stadium

1971 NCAA University Division independents football records
	Conf.			Overall
Team	W	L	T	W		L		T
No. 5 Penn State		–		11	–	1	–	0
Boston College		–		9	–	2	–	0
No. 17 Houston		–		9	–	3	–	0
No. 13 Notre Dame		–		8	–	2	–	0
Utah State		–		8	–	3	–	0
Florida State		–		8	–	4	–	0
Cincinnati		–		7	–	4	–	0
West Virginia		–		7	–	4	–	0
Temple		–		6	–	2	–	1
Air Force		–		6	–	4	–	0
Army		–		6	–	4	–	0
Colgate		–		6	–	4	–	0
Villanova		–		6	–	4	–	1
South Carolina		–		6	–	5	–	0
Southern Miss		–		6	–	5	–	0
Georgia Tech		–		6	–	6	–	0
Northern Illinois		–		5	–	5	–	1
Syracuse		–		5	–	5	–	1
Dayton		–		5	–	6	–	0
Holy Cross		–		4	–	6	–	0
Miami (FL)		–		4	–	7	–	0
Rutgers		–		4	–	7	–	0
Virginia Tech		–		4	–	7	–	0
Navy		–		3	–	8	–	0
Pittsburgh		–		3	–	8	–	0
Tulane		–		3	–	8	–	0
Marshall		–		2	–	8	–	0
Xavier		–		1	–	9	–	0
Rankings from AP Poll

The 1971 Rutgers Scarlet Knights football team represented Rutgers University as an independent during the 1971 NCAA University Division football season. In their 12th season under head coach John F. Bateman, the Scarlet Knights compiled a 4–7 record and were outscored by their opponents 243 to 193. The team's statistical leaders included Leo Gasienica with 1,148 passing yards, Larry Robertson with 405 rushing yards, and Bob Carney with 351 receiving yards.

The Scarlet Knights played their home games at Rutgers Stadium in Piscataway, New Jersey, across the river from the university's main campus in New Brunswick.

== Schedule ==
Date	Time	Opponent	Site	Result	Attendance	Source
September 18		at Lafayette	Fisher Field; Easton, PA	L 7–13	6,000–7,500	
September 25		at Princeton	Palmer Stadium; Princeton, NJ (rivalry)	W 33–18	27,000	
October 2		Cornell	Rutgers Stadium; Piscataway, NJ	L 17–31	15,000	
October 9		Lehigh	Rutgers Stadium; Piscataway, NJ	L 14–35	12,000	
October 16		at No. 1 Delaware	Delaware Stadium; Newark, DE	L 7–48	16,709	
October 23		Columbia	Rutgers Stadium; Piscataway, NJ	L 16–17	12,000	
October 30		at Bucknell	Memorial Stadium; Lewisburg, PA	L 13–14	10,400	
November 6	1:30 p.m.	at Army	Michie Stadium; West Point, NY	L 17–30	39,841	
November 13		Holy Cross	Rutgers Stadium; Piscataway, NJ	W 14–13	8,500	
November 20		Colgate	Rutgers Stadium; Piscataway, NJ	W 28–16	10,500	
November 27		Morgan State	Rutgers Stadium; Piscataway, NJ	W 27–8	9,000–10,000	
Rankings from AP Poll released prior to the game; All times are in Eastern time

== Roster ==
1971 Rutgers Scarlet Knights football team roster
Players
Coaches
Offense

Pos.	#	Name	Class
FB	22	Bill Donaldson	Sr
QB	10	Leo Gasienica	Jr
RB	36	Jim Jennings	So
WR	14	Jack Rabuck	Sr

Defense

Pos.	#	Name	Class
DT	74	Steve Allen	Sr

Special teams

Pos.	#	Name	Class
K	11	John Pace	Jr

Head coach

- John F. Bateman

Coordinators/assistant coaches

Legend

- (C) Team captain
- (S) Suspended
- (I) Ineligible
- Injured
- Redshirt
