= 1971 West Virginia Mountaineers football team =

American college football season

1971 West Virginia Mountaineers football
- Conference: Independent
- Record: 7–4
- Head coach: Bobby Bowden (2nd season)
- Home stadium: Mountaineer Field

1971 NCAA University Division independents football records
	Conf.			Overall
Team	W	L	T	W		L		T
No. 5 Penn State		–		11	–	1	–	0
Boston College		–		9	–	2	–	0
No. 17 Houston		–		9	–	3	–	0
No. 13 Notre Dame		–		8	–	2	–	0
Utah State		–		8	–	3	–	0
Florida State		–		8	–	4	–	0
Cincinnati		–		7	–	4	–	0
West Virginia		–		7	–	4	–	0
Temple		–		6	–	2	–	1
Air Force		–		6	–	4	–	0
Army		–		6	–	4	–	0
Colgate		–		6	–	4	–	0
Villanova		–		6	–	4	–	1
South Carolina		–		6	–	5	–	0
Southern Miss		–		6	–	5	–	0
Georgia Tech		–		6	–	6	–	0
Northern Illinois		–		5	–	5	–	1
Syracuse		–		5	–	5	–	1
Dayton		–		5	–	6	–	0
Holy Cross		–		4	–	6	–	0
Miami (FL)		–		4	–	7	–	0
Rutgers		–		4	–	7	–	0
Virginia Tech		–		4	–	7	–	0
Navy		–		3	–	8	–	0
Pittsburgh		–		3	–	8	–	0
Tulane		–		3	–	8	–	0
Marshall		–		2	–	8	–	0
Xavier		–		1	–	9	–	0
Rankings from AP Poll

The 1971 West Virginia Mountaineers football team represented West Virginia University in the 1971 NCAA University Division football season. It was the Mountaineers' 79th overall season and they competed as an independent. The team was led by head coach Bobby Bowden, in his second year, and played their home games at Mountaineer Field in Morgantown, West Virginia. They finished the season with a record of 7–4.

== Schedule ==
Date	Time	Opponent	Site	Result	Attendance	Source
September 11		Boston College	Mountaineer Field; Morgantown, WV	W 45–14	31,500	
September 18	4:31 p.m.	at California	California Memorial Stadium; Berkeley, CA	L 10–20	23,001–25,000	
September 25		at Richmond	City Stadium; Richmond, VA	W 16–3	11,000	
October 2		Pittsburgh	Mountaineer Field; Morgantown, WV (rivalry)	W 20–9	38,500	
October 9		at William & Mary	Cary Field; Williamsburg, VA	W 28–23	15,000	
October 16		East Carolina	Mountaineer Field; Morgantown, WV	W 44–21	27,000	
October 23		Temple	Mountaineer Field; Morgantown, WV	W 43–33	25,000	
October 30		No. 5 Penn State	Mountaineer Field; Morgantown, WV (rivalry)	L 7–35	37,000	
November 6		at Duke	Wallace Wade Stadium; Durham, NC	L 15–31	30,150	
November 13		VMI	Mountaineer Field; Morgantown, WV	W 28–3	24,000	
November 20		at Syracuse	Archbold Stadium; Syracuse, NY (rivalry)	L 24–28	18,049	
Rankings from AP Poll released prior to the game; All times are in Eastern time

== Roster ==
1971 West Virginia Mountaineers football team roster
Players
Coaches
Offense

Pos.	#	Name	Class
QB	15	Kim West	Jr

Defense

Pos.	#	Name	Class
LB	80	Ron Goodwin	Sr
DE	87	Scott Hindsley	Sr
DB	21	Leon Jenkins	Sr
DE	85	Russ Sweickert	Jr
DE	81	Tom Tamburino	Jr

Special teams

Pos.	#	Name	Class

Head coach

- Bobby Bowden

Coordinators/assistant coaches

Legend

- (C) Team captain
- (S) Suspended
- (I) Ineligible
- Injured
- Redshirt

== Game summaries ==
=== Pittsburgh ===
Pittsburgh at West Virginia

Team	1	2	3	4	Total
Pittsburgh	3	6	0	0	9
• West Virginia	13	0	0	7	20

- Date: October 2
- Location: Morgantown, West Virginia
- Game attendance: 38,500
- Source: Palm Beach Post

Scoring summary
1	PITT	Knisley 35 yard field goal	PITT 3-0
1	WVU	Marbury 10 yard run (kick failed)	WVU 6-3
1	WVU	Marbury 2 yard run (Nester kick)	WVU 13-3
2	PITT	Gindin 25 yard pass from Havern (run failed)	WVU 13-9
4	WVU	Galiffa 4 yard run (Nester kick)	WVU 20-9
