= 1971 Clemson Tigers football team =

American college football season

1971 Clemson Tigers football
- Conference: Atlantic Coast Conference
- Record: 5–6 (4–2 ACC)
- Head coach: Hootie Ingram (2nd season)
- Captains: Larry Hefner; John McMakin
- Home stadium: Memorial Stadium

1971 Atlantic Coast Conference football standings
	Conf.					Overall
Team	W		L		T	W		L		T
North Carolina $	6	–	0	–	0	9	–	3	–	0
Clemson	4	–	2	–	0	5	–	6	–	0
Duke	2	–	3	–	0	6	–	5	–	0
Wake Forest	2	–	3	–	0	6	–	5	–	0
Virginia	2	–	3	–	0	3	–	8	–	0
NC State	2	–	4	–	0	3	–	8	–	0
Maryland	1	–	4	–	0	2	–	9	–	0
$ – Conference champion; Rankings from AP Poll

The 1971 Clemson Tigers football team was an American football team that represented Clemson University in the Atlantic Coast Conference (ACC) during the 1971 NCAA University Division football season. In its second season under head coach Hootie Ingram, the team compiled a 5–6 record (4–2 against conference opponents), finished second in the ACC, and was outscored by a total of 202 to 155. The team played its home games at Memorial Stadium in Clemson, South Carolina.

Larry Hefner and end John McMakin were the team captains. The team's statistical leaders included quarterback Tommy Kendrick with 1,040 passing yards, running back Rick Gilstrap with 514 rushing yards, Don Kelley with 505 receiving yards, and John McMakin with 30 points scored (5 touchdowns).

Two Clemson players were selected by the Associated Press as first-team players on the 1971 All-Atlantic Coast Conference football team: offensive end John McMakin, defensive end Wayne Baker, and linebacker Larry Hefner.

== Schedule ==
Date	Time	Opponent	Site	Result	Attendance	Source
September 11	1:30 p.m.	Kentucky*	Memorial Stadium; Clemson, SC	L 10–13	34,000	
September 25	1:30 p.m.	No. 14 Georgia*	Memorial Stadium; Clemson, SC (rivalry)	L 0–28	38,000	
October 2	2:00 p.m.	at Georgia Tech*	Grant Field; Atlanta, GA (rivalry)	L 14–24	50,239	
October 9	2:00 p.m.	vs. No. 14 Duke	Foreman Field; Norfolk, VA (Oyster Bowl)	W 3–0	20,000	
October 16	1:30 p.m.	vs. Virginia	City Stadium; Richmond, VA (Tobacco Bowl)	W 35–15	20,000	
October 23	1:30 p.m.	at No. 5 Auburn*	Cliff Hare Stadium; Auburn, AL (rivalry)	L 13–35	55,000	
October 30	1:30 p.m.	Wake Forest^{†}	Memorial Stadium; Clemson, SC	W 10–9	34,000	
November 6	1:30 p.m.	at North Carolina	Kenan Memorial Stadium; Chapel Hill, NC	L 13–26	45,500	
November 13	1:30 p.m.	Maryland	Memorial Stadium; Clemson, SC	W 20–14	25,000	
November 20	1:30 p.m.	NC State	Memorial Stadium; Clemson, SC (rivalry)	L 23–31	28,000	
November 27	1:30 p.m.	at South Carolina*	Carolina Stadium; Columbia, SC (rivalry)	W 17–7	57,242	
*Non-conference game; ^{†}Homecoming; Rankings from AP Poll released prior to the game; All times are in Eastern time
