= 1971 Colgate Red Raiders football team =

American college football season

1971 Colgate Red Raiders football
- Conference: Independent
- Record: 6–4
- Head coach: Neil Wheelwright (4th season)
- Captains: Thomas Doyle; Steve Morgan
- Home stadium: Andy Kerr Stadium

1971 NCAA University Division independents football records
	Conf.			Overall
Team	W	L	T	W		L		T
No. 5 Penn State		–		11	–	1	–	0
Boston College		–		9	–	2	–	0
No. 17 Houston		–		9	–	3	–	0
No. 13 Notre Dame		–		8	–	2	–	0
Utah State		–		8	–	3	–	0
Florida State		–		8	–	4	–	0
Cincinnati		–		7	–	4	–	0
West Virginia		–		7	–	4	–	0
Temple		–		6	–	2	–	1
Air Force		–		6	–	4	–	0
Army		–		6	–	4	–	0
Colgate		–		6	–	4	–	0
Villanova		–		6	–	4	–	1
South Carolina		–		6	–	5	–	0
Southern Miss		–		6	–	5	–	0
Georgia Tech		–		6	–	6	–	0
Northern Illinois		–		5	–	5	–	1
Syracuse		–		5	–	5	–	1
Dayton		–		5	–	6	–	0
Holy Cross		–		4	–	6	–	0
Miami (FL)		–		4	–	7	–	0
Rutgers		–		4	–	7	–	0
Virginia Tech		–		4	–	7	–	0
Navy		–		3	–	8	–	0
Pittsburgh		–		3	–	8	–	0
Tulane		–		3	–	8	–	0
Marshall		–		2	–	8	–	0
Xavier		–		1	–	9	–	0
Rankings from AP Poll

The 1971 Colgate Red Raiders football team was an American football team that represented Colgate University as an independent during the 1971 NCAA University Division football season. In its fourth season under head coach Neil Wheelwright, the team compiled a 6–4 record. For the first time since the 1944 season, the team named two players as captains, Thomas Doyle and Steve Morgan.

The team played its home games at Andy Kerr Stadium in Hamilton, New York.

== Schedule ==
Date	Opponent	Site	Result	Attendance	Source
September 18	Boston University	Andy Kerr Stadium; Hamilton, NY	W 27–21	6,000–6,085	
September 25	at Cornell	Schoellkopf Field; Ithaca, NY (rivalry)	L 20–38	16,500	
October 2	at Yale	Yale Bowl; New Haven, CT	W 26–14	16,383	
October 9	at Holy Cross	Fitton Field; Worcester, MA	L 14–28	15,000	
October 16	at Princeton	Palmer Stadium; Princeton, NJ	L 12–35	14,000	
October 23	Brown	Andy Kerr Stadium; Hamilton, NY	W 42–32	7,000	
October 30	at Lehigh	Taylor Stadium; Bethlehem, PA	W 30–21	10,800	
November 6	Bucknell	Andy Kerr Stadium; Hamilton, NY	W 47–24	5,000	
November 13	at Lafayette	Fisher Field; Easton, PA	W 51–14	5,000–7,500	
November 20	at Rutgers	Rutgers Stadium; Piscataway, NJ	L 0–14	10,500	

== Leading players ==
Two trophies were awarded to the Red Raiders' most valuable players in 1971:

- Brian Houseal, guard, received the Andy Kerr Trophy, awarded to the most valuable offensive player.
- Mike Harlow, defensive tackle, received the Hal W. Lahar Trophy, awarded to the most valuable defensive player.

Statistical leaders for the 1971 Red Raiders included:

- Rushing: Mark van Eeghen, 846 yards and 11 touchdowns on 160 attempts
- Passing: Tom Parr, 720 yards, 41 completions and 6 touchdowns on 113 attempts
- Receiving: Steve Fraser, 381 yards and 3 touchdowns on 18 receptions
- Total offense: Tom Parr, 1,387 yards (720 passing, 667 rushing)
- Scoring: Two players with 66 points: Mark van Eeghen (11 touchdowns) and Tom Parr (11 touchdowns)
- All-purpose yards: Mark van Eeghen, 1,128 yards (846 rushing, 282 kickoff returning)
