= 1971 Holy Cross Crusaders football team =

American college football season

1971 Holy Cross Crusaders football
- Conference: Independent
- Record: 4–6
- Head coach: Ed Doherty (1st season)
- Captains: William Adams; Daniel Harper; William Stachowski
- Home stadium: Fitton Field

1971 NCAA University Division independents football records
	Conf.			Overall
Team	W	L	T	W		L		T
No. 5 Penn State		–		11	–	1	–	0
Boston College		–		9	–	2	–	0
No. 17 Houston		–		9	–	3	–	0
No. 13 Notre Dame		–		8	–	2	–	0
Utah State		–		8	–	3	–	0
Florida State		–		8	–	4	–	0
Cincinnati		–		7	–	4	–	0
West Virginia		–		7	–	4	–	0
Temple		–		6	–	2	–	1
Air Force		–		6	–	4	–	0
Army		–		6	–	4	–	0
Colgate		–		6	–	4	–	0
Villanova		–		6	–	4	–	1
South Carolina		–		6	–	5	–	0
Southern Miss		–		6	–	5	–	0
Georgia Tech		–		6	–	6	–	0
Northern Illinois		–		5	–	5	–	1
Syracuse		–		5	–	5	–	1
Dayton		–		5	–	6	–	0
Holy Cross		–		4	–	6	–	0
Miami (FL)		–		4	–	7	–	0
Rutgers		–		4	–	7	–	0
Virginia Tech		–		4	–	7	–	0
Navy		–		3	–	8	–	0
Pittsburgh		–		3	–	8	–	0
Tulane		–		3	–	8	–	0
Marshall		–		2	–	8	–	0
Xavier		–		1	–	9	–	0
Rankings from AP Poll

The 1971 Holy Cross Crusaders football team was an American football team that represented the College of the Holy Cross during the 1971 NCAA University Division football season. Ed Doherty took over for his first year as head coach. The team compiled a record of 4–6.

Holy Cross competed as an independent despite having announced in May 1971 that the Crusaders, along with the Boston University Terriers, would join the Yankee Conference. Because their previous scheduling commitments would not allow them to play the full Yankee round-robin in 1971 and 1972, HC and BU continued to compete as football independents and were not eligible for the Yankee Conference championship. Holy Cross did play non-conference games against two longstanding Yankee teams in 1971, losing to both Connecticut and Massachusetts.

All home games were played at Fitton Field on the Holy Cross campus in Worcester, Massachusetts.

== Schedule ==
Date	Opponent	Site	Result	Attendance	Source
September 25	at Harvard	Harvard Stadium; Boston, MA	W 21–16	14,000	
October 2	at Dartmouth	Memorial Field; Hanover, NH	L 9–28	13,750	
October 9	Colgate	Fitton Field; Worcester, MA	W 28–14	15,000	
October 16	Boston University^{†}	Fitton Field; Worcester, MA	W 28–14	17,500	
October 23	at Syracuse	Archbold Stadium; Syracuse, NY	L 21–63	18,308	
October 30	Northeastern^	Fitton Field; Worcester, MA	W 17–7	14,000	
November 6	at UMass	Alumni Stadium; Hadley, MA	L 27–38	14,500	
November 13	at Rutgers	Rutgers Stadium; Piscataway, NJ	L 13–14	8,500	
November 20	at Connecticut	Memorial Stadium; Storrs, CT	L 17–24	14,397	
November 27	vs. Boston College	Schaefer Stadium; Foxborough, MA (rivalry)	L 12–48	22,205	
^{†}Homecoming; ^ Family Weekend

== Statistical leaders ==
Statistical leaders for the 1971 Crusaders included:

- Rushing: Joe Wilson, 973 yards and 9 touchdowns on 177 attempts
- Passing: Mickey Connolly, 433 yards, 35 completions and 4 touchdowns on 85 attempts
- Receiving: Jack VonOhlen, 260 yards and 2 touchdowns on 16 receptions
- Scoring: Joe Wilson, 54 points from 9 touchdowns
- Total offense: Joe Wilson, 973 yards (all rushing)
- All-purpose yards: Joe Wilson, 1,128 yards (973 rushing, 114 receiving)
- Interceptions: Dan Harper, 5 interceptions for 93 yards
