= 1971 Duke Blue Devils football team =

American college football season

1971 Duke Blue Devils football
- Conference: Atlantic Coast Conference
- Record: 6–5 (2–3 ACC)
- Head coach: Mike McGee (1st season)
- MVP: Ernie Jackson
- Captains: Rich Searl; Lanny Murdock; Dennis Satyshur
- Home stadium: Wallace Wade Stadium

1971 Atlantic Coast Conference football standings
	Conf.					Overall
Team	W		L		T	W		L		T
North Carolina $	6	–	0	–	0	9	–	3	–	0
Clemson	4	–	2	–	0	5	–	6	–	0
Duke	2	–	3	–	0	6	–	5	–	0
Wake Forest	2	–	3	–	0	6	–	5	–	0
Virginia	2	–	3	–	0	3	–	8	–	0
NC State	2	–	4	–	0	3	–	8	–	0
Maryland	1	–	4	–	0	2	–	9	–	0
$ – Conference champion; Rankings from AP Poll

The 1971 Duke Blue Devils football team was an American football team that represented Duke University as a member of the Atlantic Coast Conference (ACC) during the 1971 NCAA University Division football season. In their first year under head coach Mike McGee, the Blue Devils compiled an overall record of 6–5, with a conference record of 2–3, and finished tied for third in the ACC.

== Schedule ==
Date	Time	Opponent	Rank	Site	Result	Attendance	Source
September 11		vs. Florida*		Tampa Stadium; Tampa, FL	W 12–6	51,677	
September 18		No. 19 South Carolina*		Wallace Wade Stadium; Durham, NC	W 28–12	35,113	
September 25		at Virginia	No. 20	Scott Stadium; Charlottesville, VA	W 28–0	18,500	
October 2	4:32 p.m.	at No. 10 Stanford*	No. 19	Stanford Stadium; Stanford, CA	W 9–3	61,000	
October 9		vs. Clemson	No. 14	Foreman Field; Norfolk, VA (Oyster Bowl)	L 0–3	20,000	
October 16		NC State^{†}		Wallace Wade Stadium; Durham, NC (rivalry)	W 41–13	28,174	
October 23	2:00 p.m.	at Navy*	No. 19	Navy–Marine Corps Memorial Stadium; Annapolis, MD	L 14–15	24,844	
October 30		at Georgia Tech*		Grant Field; Atlanta, GA	L 0–21	49,886	
November 6		West Virginia*		Wallace Wade Stadium; Durham, NC	W 31–15	30,150	
November 13		at Wake Forest		Groves Stadium; Winston-Salem, NC (rivalry)	L 7–23	32,000	
November 20		North Carolina		Wallace Wade Stadium; Durham, NC (Victory Bell)	L 0–38	51,500	
*Non-conference game; ^{†}Homecoming; Rankings from AP Poll released prior to the game; All times are in Eastern time

== Roster ==
1971 Duke Blue Devils football team roster
Players
Coaches
Offense

Pos.	#	Name	Class
RB	46	Steve Jones	Jr
OT	64	Ed Newman	Jr

Defense

Pos.	#	Name	Class
DB	13	Ernie Jackson	Sr

Special teams

Pos.	#	Name	Class

Head coach

- Mike McGee

Coordinators/assistant coaches

- John Gutekunst
  (Freshman coach)

Legend

- (C) Team captain
- (S) Suspended
- (I) Ineligible
- Injured
- Redshirt
