= Bill Dooley =

American football player and coach (1934–2016)

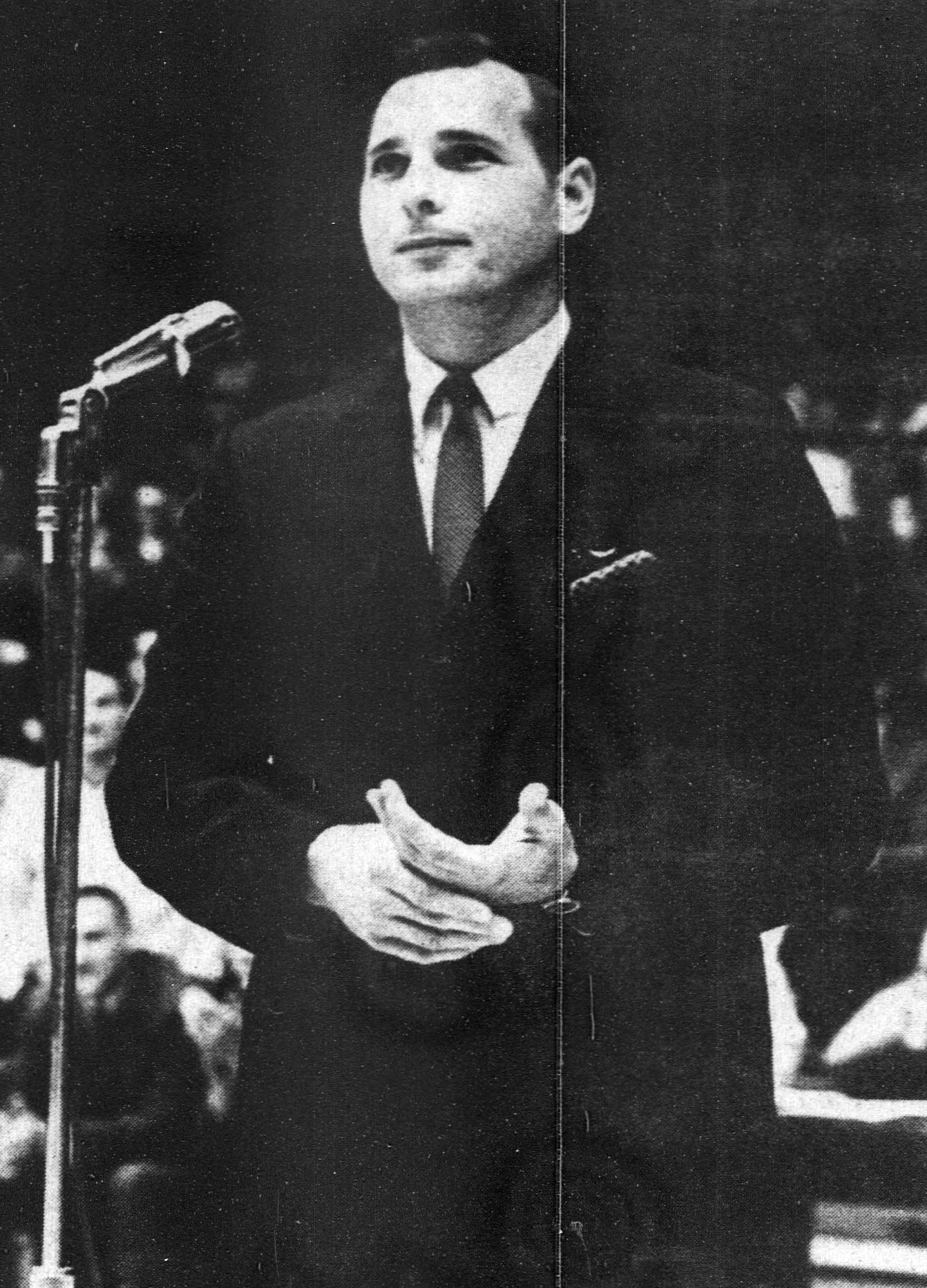
- Dooley at Carmichael Auditorium in 1967

Biographical details
- Born: May 19, 1934; Mobile, Alabama, U.S.
- Died: August 9, 2016 (aged 82); Wilmington, North Carolina, U.S.

Playing career
- 1953–1955: Mississippi State
- Position: Guard

Coaching career (HC unless noted)
- 1957–1960: Mississippi State (freshmen / asst. OL)
- 1963: Mississippi State (OL)
- 1964–1966: Georgia (OC)
- 1967–1977: North Carolina
- 1978–1986: Virginia Tech
- 1987–1992: Wake Forest

Administrative career (AD unless noted)
- 1978–1986: Virginia Tech

Head coaching record
- Overall: 162–126–5
- Bowls: 3–7

Accomplishments and honors

Championships
- 3 ACC (1971–1972, 1977)

Awards
- 3× ACC Coach of the Year (1971, 1987, 1992); North Carolina Sports Hall of Fame (1995)

William Gerald Dooley (May 19, 1934 – August 9, 2016) was an American football player, coach, and college athletics administrator. He served as the head coach at the University of North Carolina at Chapel Hill (1967–1977), Virginia Polytechnic Institute and State University (1978–1986), and Wake Forest University (1987–1992), compiling a career college football record of 162–126–5.

== Early life and family ==
Dooley was born in 1934, in Mobile, Alabama. There, he attended the McGill Institute, administered by the Brothers of the Sacred Heart. Dooley then attended Perkinston Junior College in Perkinston, Mississippi from 1952 to 1953. In 1953, he joined Coach Darrel Royal at Mississippi State University and graduated in 1956, where he was an all-SEC lineman for the Maroons/Bulldogs. Dooley's brother is former University of Georgia head football coach Vince Dooley, and the two went against each other's teams in the 1971 Gator Bowl. His nephew, Derek Dooley is the former head football coach at the University of Tennessee. He resided in Wilmington, North Carolina, and was married to Marie Dooley. He has four sons: Jim Dooley and Billy Dooley from his first marriage to the late Chris Dooley, and Sean Dooley, from his second marriage to Marie Dooley.

== Coaching and administrative career ==
=== North Carolina (1967–1977) ===
Bill Dooley, brother of former Georgia head football coach Vince Dooley and uncle of former Louisiana Tech and Tennessee head football coach Derek Dooley, came to North Carolina from his post as Offensive Coordinator at Georgia. Dooley enjoyed success at UNC, compiling a 69–53–2 record in 11 seasons. Six of those seasons were bowl appearances, five losses and one win.

In 1967, the Tar Heels struggled to a 2–8 record, with wins over Maryland and Duke. In 1968, Carolina showed a little improvement, finishing 3–7 with wins over Vanderbilt, No. 7 Florida, and Duke. In 1969, Carolina finished 5–5, their best season in five years.

Dooley's 1970 team finished 8–4 and concluded the season with a loss to No. 8 Arizona State in the 1970 Peach Bowl. The Tar Heels improved in 1971, posting a 9–3 record that included a loss to No. 6 Georgia—coached by Dooley's older brother—in the 1971 Gator Bowl (December). Altogether, the match was also called the "Dooley Bowl". The 1971 team finished the season ranked No. 18 in the Coaches’ Poll and captured its first outright Atlantic Coast Conference (ACC) championship with a perfect 6–0 conference record.

The 1972 season marked the pinnacle of Dooley's tenure at North Carolina. The Tar Heels finished 11–1, defeating Texas Tech in the 1972 Sun Bowl, and became the first team in school history to win 11 games in a single season. Dooley also became the only head coach in UNC football history to win back-to-back ACC championships. The Tar Heels finished the season ranked No. 14 in the Coaches’ Poll and No. 12 in the AP Poll.

North Carolina struggled in 1973, finishing 4–7 with wins over William & Mary, Kentucky, and Wake Forest. The Tar Heels rebounded in 1974 with a 7–5 record but lost to Mississippi State in the 1974 Sun Bowl. The 1975 season proved difficult, as North Carolina finished 3–7–1.

Dooley guided the Tar Heels to a 9–3 record in 1976, capped by a loss to No. 19 Kentucky in the 1976 Peach Bowl. In 1977, North Carolina swept the ACC schedule and tied Clemson, which had lost to Maryland, resulting in Dooley's third and final ACC championship. The Tar Heels finished the season 8–3–1 and lost to No. 12 Nebraska in the 1977 Liberty Bowl. The team concluded the season ranked No. 14 in the Coaches’ Poll and No. 17 in the AP Poll.

Following the 1977 season, Dooley departed North Carolina to accept a dual role as athletics director and head football coach at Virginia Tech. He remained the winningest head coach in North Carolina football history until being surpassed by Dick Crum in 1987.

=== Virginia Tech (1978–1986) ===
After his tenure at North Carolina, Dooley served as the athletic director and head football coach at Virginia Tech. During his tenure, the Hokies appeared in three bowl games, equaling the total number of bowl appearances in the program's history prior to his arrival. The 1986 team finished the season with a 9–2–1 record and won the Peach Bowl, the first bowl victory in Virginia Tech history. The team was later credited with a tenth win after Temple forfeited its entire 1986 season—including a 29–13 victory over Virginia Tech—due to the use of an ineligible player. As recorded by the NCAA, the 1986 season stands as Virginia Tech's first 10-win season.

His tenure at Virginia Tech, however, ended shortly afterward amidst allegations of NCAA recruiting violations and financial mismanagement in the athletic department. After resigning from his positions at Virginia Tech, he sued the university for $3,500,000 alleging breach of contract. The lawsuit was settled out of court. At the time, he was the winningest coach in Virginia Tech history, though he was eventually surpassed by his successor, Frank Beamer.

=== Wake Forest (1987–1992) ===
Bill Dooley came to Wake Forest after a brief retirement from coaching. He had previously been a head football coach at Virginia Tech and North Carolina.

In Dooley's first season, the team compiled a 7–4 record and finished in a tie for third place in the Atlantic Coast Conference. Dooley recorded the second-most wins by a first-year head coach in Wake Forest history, totaling seven victories—trailing only Jake Dickert, who posted nine in 2025. The next year, Wake Forest compiled a 6–4–1 record and finished in a tie for fourth place in the Atlantic Coast Conference. In 1989, the Demon Deacons compiled a 2–8–1 record and finished in seventh place in the Atlantic Coast Conference. The following season, Wake Forest finished with a 3–8 record and finished in last place in the Atlantic Coast Conference. In 1991, Wake Forest again finished last in the ACC with a 3–8 record. Dooley led the Demon Deacons to one bowl game, the 1992 Independence Bowl, which Wake Forest won, capping off an 8–4 season in which they finished ranked No. 25 in both the AP and Coaches Polls, respectively. Dooley re-retired after that game. Dooley retired after the 1992 season. His six seasons in Winston-Salem are tied for fourth for longest tenure and his 29 wins are third in most wins in Wake Forest history. He had three winning seasons at Wake Forest, 7–4 in 1987, 6–4–1 in 1988, and the 8–4 1992 team. Dooley's final record is 29–36–2.

He is tied with Paul Amen for the most Atlantic Coast Conference Coach of the Year honors in school history, with two awards.

== Retirement and death ==
After he retired from coaching, Dooley served as director of the North Carolina Sports Development Office and founded the chapter of the National Football Foundation that covers eastern North Carolina and the Triangle area that includes Raleigh, Durham and Chapel Hill. He died at his home in Wilmington, North Carolina of natural causes at age 82.

== Awards and honors ==
Dooley was inducted into the Mississippi State Athletics Hall of Fame in 1979, Mobile Sports Hall of Fame in 1993, North Carolina Sports Hall of Fame in 1995, and the Greater Wilmington Sports Hall of Fame in 2011. The NFFCHOF Bill Dooley Chapter, located in the Raleigh-Durham area, was established in 1995 and is named in Dooley's honor.

Founded in 2020, the Coach Bill Dooley Education Foundation serves the Wilmington, NC area by providing scholarships to student-athletes, honoring the enduring legacy of Coach Bill Dooley. Former NFL kicker Connor Barth serves as Vice Chairman of the board and hosts an annual celebrity golf tournament in support of the foundation.

== Head coaching record ==
Year	Team	Overall	Conference	Standing	Bowl/playoffs	Coaches^{#}	AP^{°}
North Carolina Tar Heels (Atlantic Coast Conference) (1967–1977)
1967	North Carolina	2–8	2–5	7th			
1968	North Carolina	3–7	1–6	8th			
1969	North Carolina	5–5	3–3	T–3rd			
1970	North Carolina	8–4	5–2	T–2nd	L Peach		
1971	North Carolina	9–3	6–0	1st	L Gator	18	
1972	North Carolina	11–1	6–0	1st	W Sun	14	12
1973	North Carolina	4–7	1–5	6th			
1974	North Carolina	7–5	4–2	T–2nd	L Sun		
1975	North Carolina	3–7–1	1–4–1	6th			
1976	North Carolina	9–3	4–1	2nd	L Peach		
1977	North Carolina	8–3–1	5–0–1	1st	L Liberty	14	17
North Carolina:		69–53–2	38–28–2				
Virginia Tech Gobblers / Hokies (NCAA Division I-A Independent) (1978–1986)
1978	Virginia Tech	4–7					
1979	Virginia Tech	5–6					
1980	Virginia Tech	8–4			L Peach		
1981	Virginia Tech	7–4					
1982	Virginia Tech	7–4					
1983	Virginia Tech	9–2					
1984	Virginia Tech	8–4			L Independence		
1985	Virginia Tech	6–5					
1986	Virginia Tech	10–2–1			W Peach		20
Virginia Tech:		64–38–1					
Wake Forest Demon Deacons (Atlantic Coast Conference) (1987–1992)
1987	Wake Forest	7–4	4–3	T–3rd			
1988	Wake Forest	6–4–1	4–3	T–4th			
1989	Wake Forest	2–8–1	1–6	7th			
1990	Wake Forest	3–8	0–7	8th			
1991	Wake Forest	3–8	1–6	T–7th			
1992	Wake Forest	8–4	4–4	T–4th	W Independence	25	25
Wake Forest:		29–36–2	14–29				
Total:		163–126–5					
National championship Conference title Conference division title or championship game berth
^{#}Rankings from final Coaches Poll.; ^{°}Rankings from final AP Poll.
