= Vince Dooley =

American college football coach and administrator (1932–2022)

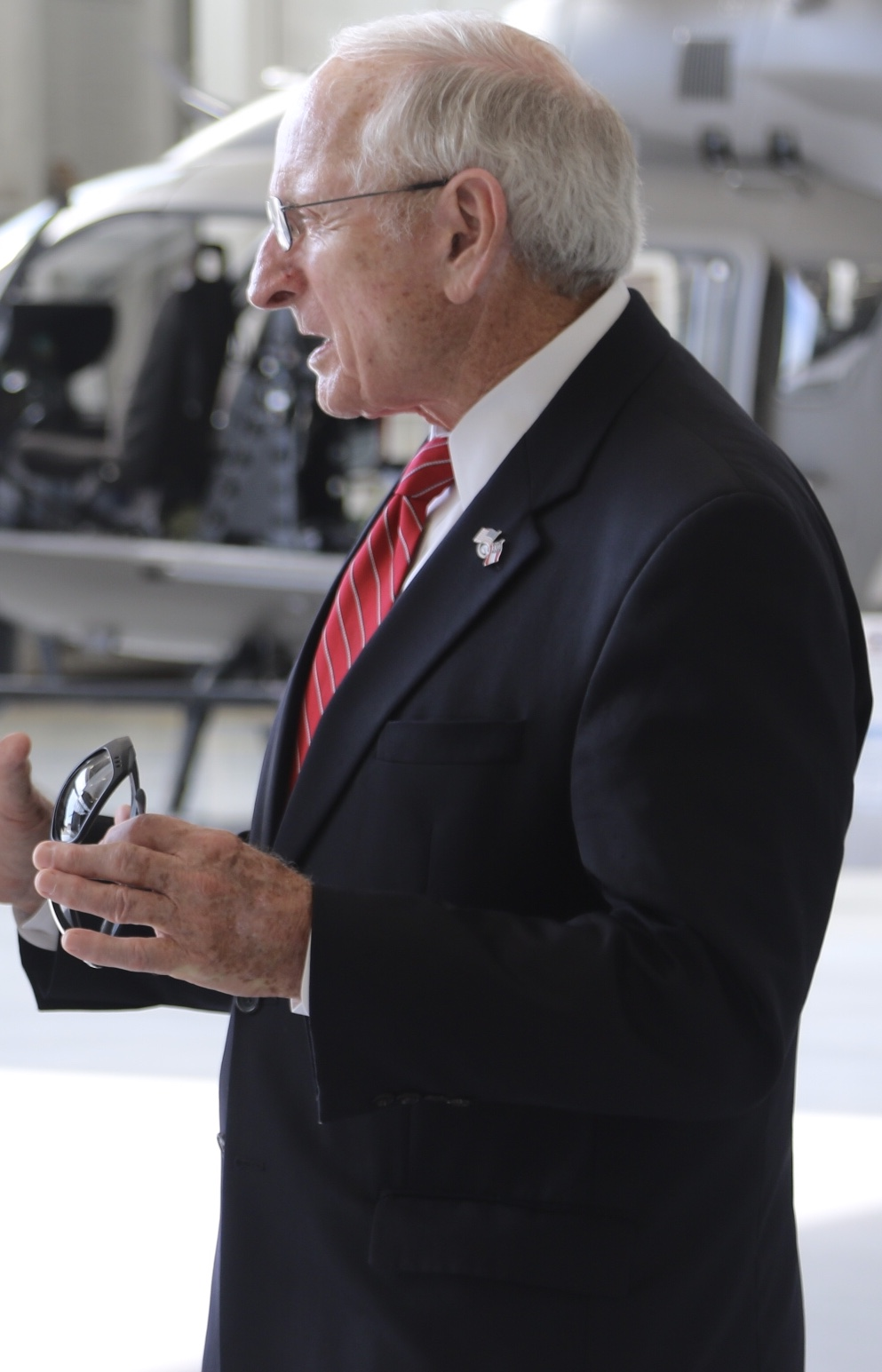
- Dooley in 2016

Biographical details
- Born: September 4, 1932; Mobile, Alabama, U.S.
- Died: October 28, 2022 (aged 90); Athens, Georgia, U.S.

Playing career
- 1951–1953: Auburn
- Position: Quarterback

Coaching career (HC unless noted)
- 1956–1960: Auburn (QB)
- 1961–1963: Auburn (freshman)
- 1964–1988: Georgia

Administrative career (AD unless noted)
- 1979–2004: Georgia

Head coaching record
- Overall: 201–77–10
- Bowls: 8–10–2

Accomplishments and honors

Championships
- 1 National (1980); 6 SEC (1966, 1968, 1976, 1980–1982)

Awards
- Bobby Dodd Coach of the Year Award (1976); Georgia Sports Hall of Fame (1978); AFCA Coach of the Year (1980); Eddie Robinson Coach of the Year (1980); Sporting News College Football COY (1980); Walter Camp Coach of the Year (1980); Alabama Sports Hall of Fame (1984); Amos Alonzo Stagg Award (2001); Carl Maddox Sport Management Award (2004); UGA Circle of Honor (2004); Homer Rice Award (2007); "Bear" Bryant Lifetime Achievement Award (2009); 5× SEC Coach of the Year (1966, 1968, 1976, 1978, 1980); Second-team All-SEC (1951)
- College Football Hall of Fame; Inducted in 1994 (profile)

Vincent Joseph Dooley (September 4, 1932 – October 28, 2022) was an American college football coach. He was the head coach of the Georgia Bulldogs from 1964 to 1988, as well as the University of Georgia's (UGA) athletic director from 1979 to 2004. During his 25-year head coaching career, Dooley compiled a 201–77–10 record. His teams won six Southeastern Conference (SEC) titles and the 1980 national championship. After the 1980 season, Dooley was recognized as college football's "Coach of the Year" by several organizations. He was inducted into the College Football Hall of Fame in 1994.

== Early life and education ==
Dooley was born in Mobile, Alabama, on September 4, 1932. He was of Irish and Italian descent. He attended the McGill Institute, administered by the Brothers of the Sacred Heart. He competed on behalf of McGill's athletic teams, known as the Yellow Jackets. He was recognized as an all-state player in both football and basketball, but considered the latter to be his best sport.

Dooley was awarded a football scholarship to study at Auburn University, where he played college football and later coached under Ralph "Shug" Jordan. He graduated with a bachelor's degree in business management in 1954, and was a member of the Phi Kappa Theta fraternity. After serving as an infantry officer in the United States Marine Corps from 1954 to 1956, he returned to Auburn and eventually obtained a master's degree in history in 1963.

== Coaching career ==
While he was completing his master's at Auburn, Dooley first worked as quarterback coach under Jordan for five years, before serving as the school's head freshman coach for three years. He was then appointed head coach of the Georgia Bulldogs in 1963, at the age of 31, even though he had no prior experience at that position. During his first season with the team, Dooley finished with a 7–3–1 record and led the Bulldogs to the Sun Bowl, defeating the Texas Tech Red Raiders. He oversaw Georgia's upset 18–17 win over Alabama, the defending national champion, in the opening game of 1965, before guiding Georgia to the 1966 Southeastern Conference (SEC) title, their first in seven seasons. The school lost only one game that year, won the Cotton Bowl Classic against the SMU Mustangs, and the finished as 4th in the final AP Poll of the season. Two years later, Georgia won their second SEC title under Dooley, but they lost the Sugar Bowl to the Arkansas Razorbacks.

Dooley led the Bulldogs to victories in the December 1971 Gator Bowl and the Peach Bowl two years later. He won his third SEC title with the school in 1976, losing only one game in the regular season and shutting out the Alabama Crimson Tide 21–0 at home. However, UGA lost the Sugar Bowl that year 27–3 to Pittsburgh, the national champions. At the end of the season, Dooley became the first recipient of the Bobby Dodd Coach of the Year Award. Georgia finished the 1977 season with a 5–6 record, representing the only losing season in Dooley's career as head coach. Two years later, he was appointed as Georgia's co-athletic director after Joel Eaves retired, before gaining the role exclusively in 1980 to entice him to stay at UGA after Auburn (his alma mater) offered him the position of football coach and athletic director. The Bulldogs finished the 1980 season with a perfect 12–0 record and became consensus national champions for the first time after defeating Notre Dame 17–10 in the Sugar Bowl. Dooley was consequently honored as AFCA Coach of the Year, Eddie Robinson Coach of the Year, Walter Camp Coach of the Year, and Sporting News College Football Coach of the Year.

The Bulldogs won two more SEC titles during Dooley's tenure (1981 and 1982), but lost the Sugar Bowl in both those seasons. Georgia won the Cotton Bowl in 1983, the Liberty Bowl four years later, and the 1988 Gator Bowl, his final game as head coach. In his 25 seasons as Georgia's head football coach, Dooley won six SEC championships and led the school to 201 victories. He was also named SEC Coach of the Year four times (1966, 1968, 1976, and 1980). Dooley retired as head coach at the conclusion of the 1988 season. At the time, he was the second-winningest coach in SEC history, behind only Bear Bryant.

== Later career ==
Although Dooley also intended to retire as UGA's athletic director in 1988, he agreed to remain until his successor could be appointed. However, no replacement was forthcoming and he retained his position. During his tenure as athletic director, he hired former football coach Mark Richt from Florida State University.

Dooley briefly pursued the Democratic Party nomination for Senate seat in Georgia in July 1985 while he was still Georgia's head coach, but ultimately decided against running, stating that it would be "very poor timing" for him to leave the team before the start of the season. He also considered running for governor of Georgia five years later. His wife ran in the Republican Party primary for U.S. House in 2002. Dooley resigned as Georgia's athletic director in 2004, after feuding with the university's president Michael F. Adams. He was later hired by Kennesaw State University in December 2009 to work as their consultant, as part of the school's drive to start a football program.

One of Dooley's hobbies in retirement was gardening, about which he has published a book. He also partnered with Mascot Books to publish two children's books about the UGA mascot, How 'Bout Them Dawgs! and Hairy Dawg's Journey Through the Peach State. Dooley was the chairman of the board of curators for the Georgia Historical Society from 2016 to 2018.

== Personal life ==
Dooley married Barbara Meshad in March 1960. They met while studying at Auburn together, and remained married until his death. Together, they had four children. One of them, Derek Dooley, was the head football coach at the University of Tennessee and Louisiana Tech University, an assistant coach for the Miami Dolphins, the University of Georgia, Missouri, and LSU, as well as a position coach for the New York Giants.

Dooley's younger brother, Bill Dooley, worked on the Georgia Bulldogs football staff, before becoming a noted college head coach in his own right at the University of North Carolina, Virginia Tech, and Wake Forest. The two brothers found themselves on opposing sidelines during the December 1971 Gator Bowl, played in Jacksonville, Florida.

Dooley died on October 28, 2022, at home in Athens, Georgia. He was 90, and had recovered from mild symptoms of COVID-19 in the same month as his death.

Dooley was interred at Oconee Hill Cemetery, behind Sanford Stadium, on November 3, 2022.

== Awards and honors ==
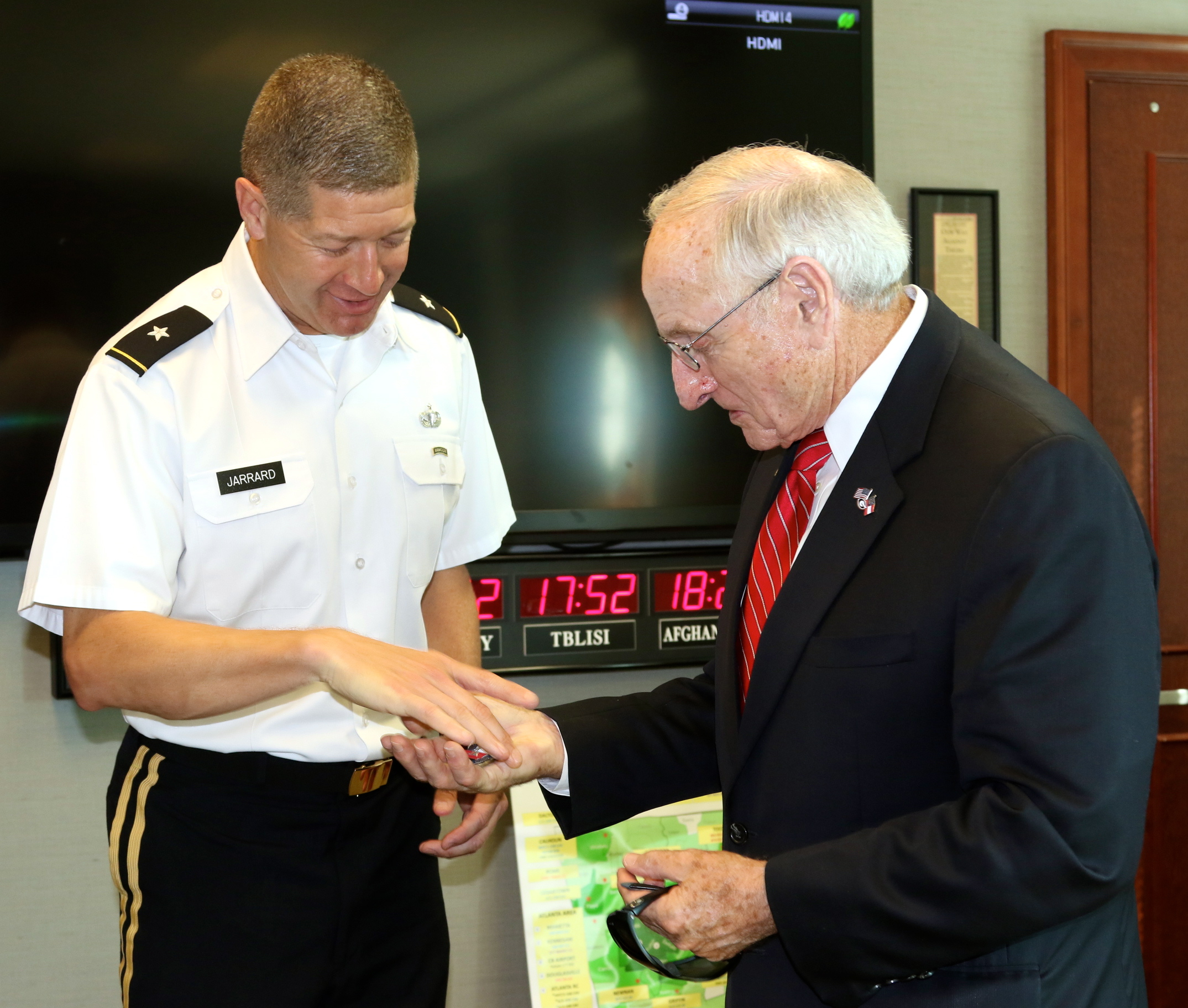
Dooley receives a challenge coin from Brig. Gen. Joseph Jarrard in 2016.

Dooley was inducted in the Georgia Sports Hall of Fame in 1978, the Alabama Sports Hall of Fame in 1984, and the College Football Hall of Fame in 1994. He was conferred the Amos Alonzo Stagg Award, presented by the American Football Coaches Association in 2001. Two years later, the U.S. Sports Academy presented Dooley with the Carl Maddox Sport Management Award, an award given annually to an individual for contribution to the growth and development of sports through management practices. In 2004, Dooley was enshrined into UGA's Circle of Honor, which is the school's highest tribute to former athletes and coaches. Dooley received the Homer Rice Award, the highest honor given by the Division I-A Athletic Directors Association, in September 2007.

Dooley was inducted as a Georgia Trustee in 2011. Conferred by the Georgia Historical Society, in conjunction with the Governor of Georgia, to individuals whose accomplishments and community service reflect the ideals of the founding body of Trustees, which governed the Georgia colony from 1732 to 1752. He was inducted into the Marine Corps Sports Hall of Fame in July 2012. Six years later, the Georgia Historical Society established the Vincent J. Dooley Distinguished Fellows Program in honor of Dooley. It was designed to accomplish two goals consistent with Dooley's life and legacy – recognizing senior scholars in the field of history and mentoring and developing emerging historians. Historian David Blight and author Rick Atkinson have been named Vincent J. Dooley Distinguished Teaching Fellows.

On September 7, 2019, the football field inside the University of Georgia's Sanford Stadium was named "Dooley Field" in honor of the coach.

== Head coaching record ==
Year	Team	Overall	Conference	Standing	Bowl/playoffs	Coaches^{#}	AP^{°}
Georgia Bulldogs (Southeastern Conference) (1964–1988)
1964	Georgia	7–3–1	4–2	T–2nd	W Sun		
1965	Georgia	6–4	3–3	T–6th		15	
1966	Georgia	10–1	6–0	T–1st	W Cotton	4	4
1967	Georgia	7–4	4–2	T–3rd	L Liberty	18	
1968	Georgia	8–1–2	5–0–1	1st	L Sugar	4	8
1969	Georgia	5–5–1	2–3–1	6th	L Sun		
1970	Georgia	5–5	3–3	T–5th			
1971	Georgia	11–1	5–1	T–2nd	W Gator	8	7
1972	Georgia	7–4	4–3	5th			
1973	Georgia	7–4–1	3–4	T–5th	W Peach		
1974	Georgia	6–6	4–2	T–2nd	L Tangerine		
1975	Georgia	9–3	5–1	T–2nd	L Cotton	19	19
1976	Georgia	10–2	5–1	1st	L Sugar	10	10
1977	Georgia	5–6	2–4	T–6th			
1978	Georgia	9–2–1	5–0–1	2nd	L Astro-Bluebonnet	15	16
1979	Georgia	6–5	5–1	2nd			
1980	Georgia	12–0	6–0	1st	W Sugar	1	1
1981	Georgia	10–2	6–0	T–1st	L Sugar	5	6
1982	Georgia	11–1	6–0	1st	L Sugar	4	4
1983	Georgia	10–1–1	5–1	2nd	W Cotton	4	4
1984	Georgia	7–4–1	4–2	T–3rd	T Florida Citrus		
1985	Georgia	7–3–2	3–2–1	5th	T Sun		
1986	Georgia	8–4	4–2	T–2nd	L Hall of Fame		
1987	Georgia	9–3	4–2	T–4th	W Liberty	14	13
1988	Georgia	9–3	5–2	3rd	W Gator	15	15
Georgia:		201–77–10	108–41–4				
Total:		201–77–10					
National championship Conference title Conference division title or championship game berth
^{#}Rankings from final Coaches Poll.; ^{°}Rankings from final AP Poll.

== See also ==
- List of college football career coaching wins leaders
- List of presidents of the American Football Coaches Association
- Legends Poll

== General and cited sources ==
- The New Georgia Encyclopedia (November 9, 2004). "Vince Dooley (b. 1932)". Retrieved May 13, 2005.
