= 1971 Virginia Cavaliers football team =

American college football season

1971 Virginia Cavaliers football
- Conference: Atlantic Coast Conference
- Record: 3–8 (2–3 ACC)
- Head coach: Don Lawrence (1st season)
- Captains: Gary Helman; Andy Selfridge
- Home stadium: Scott Stadium

1971 Atlantic Coast Conference football standings
	Conf.					Overall
Team	W		L		T	W		L		T
North Carolina $	6	–	0	–	0	9	–	3	–	0
Clemson	4	–	2	–	0	5	–	6	–	0
Duke	2	–	3	–	0	6	–	5	–	0
Wake Forest	2	–	3	–	0	6	–	5	–	0
Virginia	2	–	3	–	0	3	–	8	–	0
NC State	2	–	4	–	0	3	–	8	–	0
Maryland	1	–	4	–	0	2	–	9	–	0
$ – Conference champion; Rankings from AP Poll

The 1971 Virginia Cavaliers football team represented the University of Virginia during the 1971 NCAA University Division football season. The Cavaliers were led by first-year head coach Don Lawrence and played their home games at Scott Stadium in Charlottesville, Virginia. They competed as members of the Atlantic Coast Conference, finishing tied for third.

== Schedule ==
Date	Time	Opponent	Site	Result	Attendance	Source
September 11	1:30 p.m.	Navy*	Scott Stadium; Charlottesville, VA	L 6–10	23,500	
September 18		at No. 4 Michigan*	Michigan Stadium; Ann Arbor, MI	L 0–56	81,391	
September 25		No. 20 Duke^{†}	Scott Stadium; Charlottesville, VA	L 0–28	18,500	
October 2		Vanderbilt*	Scott Stadium; Charlottesville, VA	W 27–23	12,500	
October 9		at South Carolina*	Carolina Stadium; Columbia, SC	L 14–34	43,861	
October 16		vs. Clemson	City Stadium; Richmond, VA (Tobacco Bowl)	L 15–32	14,000	
October 23		at Army*	Michie Stadium; West Point, NY	L 9–14	42,535	
October 30		at NC State	Carter Stadium; Raleigh, NC	W 14–10	21,600	
November 6		Virginia Tech*	Scott Stadium; Charlottesville, VA (rivalry)	L 0–6	30,100	
November 13		North Carolina	Scott Stadium; Charlottesville, VA (South's Oldest Rivalry)	L 20–32	18,450	
November 20		at Maryland	Byrd Stadium; College Park, MD (rivalry)	W 29–27	12,600	
*Non-conference game; ^{†}Homecoming; Rankings from AP Poll released prior to the game; All times are in Eastern time
