= 1971 Georgia Tech Yellow Jackets football team =

American college football season

1971 Georgia Tech Yellow Jackets football
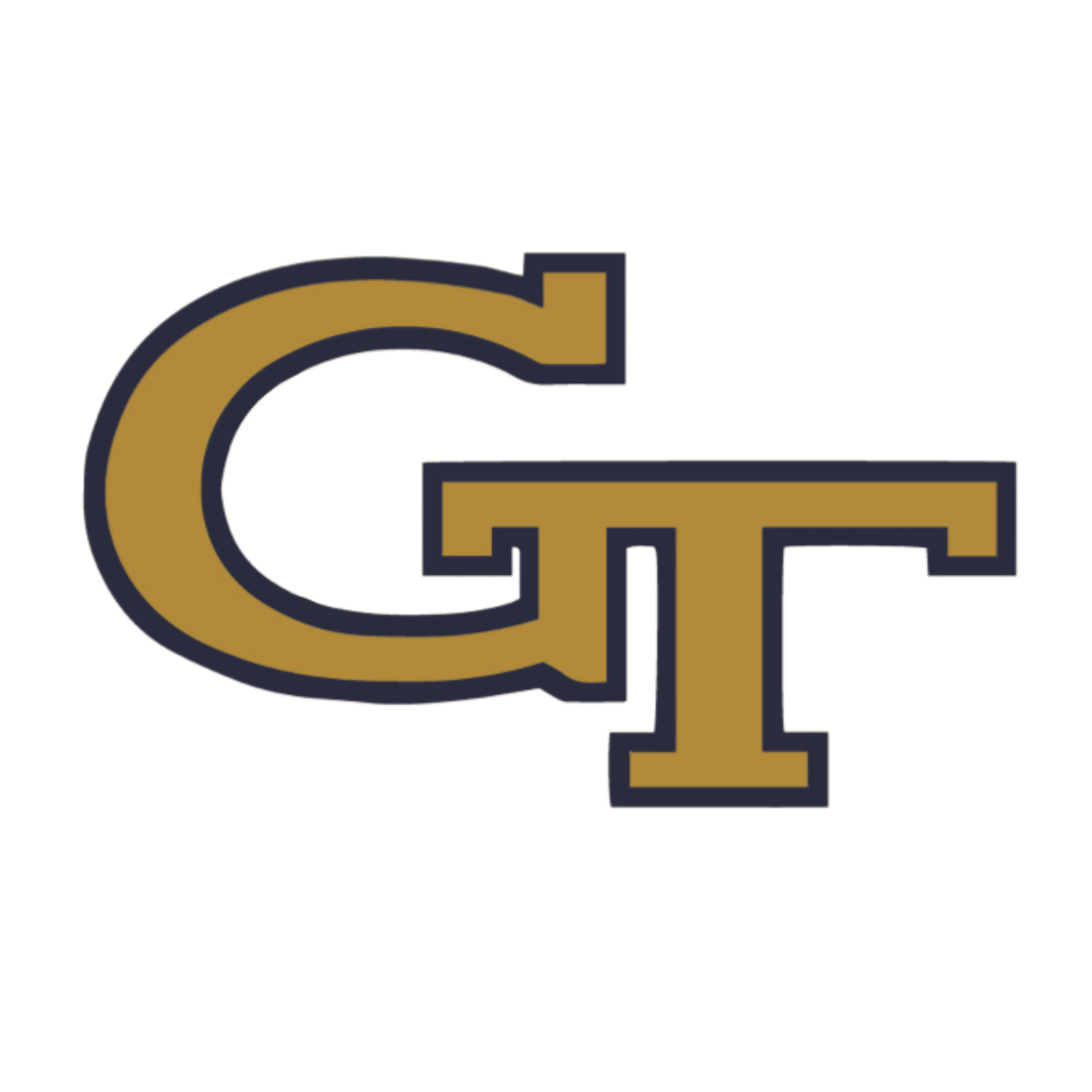

Peach Bowl, L 18–41 vs. Ole Miss
- Conference: Independent
- Record: 6–6
- Head coach: Bud Carson (5th season)
- Captains: Brent Cunningham; Jeff Ford
- Home stadium: Grant Field

1971 NCAA University Division independents football records
	Conf.			Overall
Team	W	L	T	W		L		T
No. 5 Penn State		–		11	–	1	–	0
Boston College		–		9	–	2	–	0
No. 17 Houston		–		9	–	3	–	0
No. 13 Notre Dame		–		8	–	2	–	0
Utah State		–		8	–	3	–	0
Florida State		–		8	–	4	–	0
Cincinnati		–		7	–	4	–	0
West Virginia		–		7	–	4	–	0
Temple		–		6	–	2	–	1
Air Force		–		6	–	4	–	0
Army		–		6	–	4	–	0
Colgate		–		6	–	4	–	0
Villanova		–		6	–	4	–	1
South Carolina		–		6	–	5	–	0
Southern Miss		–		6	–	5	–	0
Georgia Tech		–		6	–	6	–	0
Northern Illinois		–		5	–	5	–	1
Syracuse		–		5	–	5	–	1
Dayton		–		5	–	6	–	0
Holy Cross		–		4	–	6	–	0
Miami (FL)		–		4	–	7	–	0
Rutgers		–		4	–	7	–	0
Virginia Tech		–		4	–	7	–	0
Navy		–		3	–	8	–	0
Pittsburgh		–		3	–	8	–	0
Tulane		–		3	–	8	–	0
Marshall		–		2	–	8	–	0
Xavier		–		1	–	9	–	0
Rankings from AP Poll

The 1971 Georgia Tech Yellow Jackets football team represented the Georgia Institute of Technology as an independent during the 1971 NCAA University Division football season. The Yellow Jackets were led by fifth-year head coach Bud Carson and played their home games at Grant Field in Atlanta. They were invited to the 1971 Peach Bowl, held just 3 miles from their home stadium in Atlanta, where they lost to Ole Miss, 18–41. After the season, Bud Carson was fired as head coach after compiling a 27–27 record over five seasons.

== Schedule ==
Date	Time	Opponent	Rank	Site	TV	Result	Attendance	Source
September 11		at South Carolina	No. 17	Carolina Stadium; Columbia, SC		L 7–24	54,842	
September 18		No. 18 Michigan State		Grant Field; Atlanta, GA		W 10–0	50,646	
September 25	2:00 p.m.	Army		Grant Field; Atlanta, GA		L 13–16	40,123	
October 2		Clemson		Grant Field; Atlanta, GA (rivalry)		W 24–14	50,239	
October 9		at No. 13 Tennessee		Neyland Stadium; Knoxville, TN (rivalry)		L 6–10	63,671	
October 16		No. 5 Auburn		Grant Field; Atlanta, GA (rivalry)		L 14–31	60,204	
October 23		at Tulane		Tulane Stadium; New Orleans, LA		W 24–16	50,248	
October 30		Duke^{†}		Grant Field; Atlanta, GA		W 21–0	49,886	
November 6	2:00 p.m.	Navy		Grant Field; Atlanta, GA		W 34–21	44,821	
November 13		Florida State		Grant Field; Atlanta, GA		W 12–6	44,261	
November 25		No. 7 Georgia		Grant Field; Atlanta, GA (Clean, Old-Fashioned Hate)	ABC	L 24–28	60,124	
December 30		No. 17 Ole Miss		Atlanta Stadium; Atlanta, GA (Peach Bowl)	CBS	L 18–41	36,771	
^{†}Homecoming; Rankings from AP Poll released prior to the game; All times are in Eastern time

== Roster ==
1971 Georgia Tech Yellow Jackets football team roster
Players
Coaches
Offense

Pos.	#	Name	Class
C	56	John Callan	Sr
OT	70	Glenn Costello	Jr
RB	44	Brent Cunningham	Sr
OL		Scott Engel
TE	80	Mark Fields	So
RB	42	Rob Healy	Jr
RB	48	Alan Hennessey	So
RB	49	Greg Horne	So
OT	79	Al Hutko	Sr
TE	82	Dan Karlo	Jr
G	65	Vernon Jackson	So
G, OT	71	Tommy Jones	So
WR	83	Herman Lam	Jr
RB	47	Tom Lang	So
OT	74	Rick Lantz	Jr
RB	45	Tim Macy	Jr
QB	1	Eddie McAshan	Jr
RB	29	Kevin McNamara	Jr
QB	18	Jack O'Neill	Jr
WR	89	Jim Owings	So
TE	86	Mike Oven	Jr
RB	27	Robert Stevenson	So
WR	33	Larry Studdard	Sr
QB	16	Tommy Turrentine	So

Defense

Pos.	#	Name	Class
LB	57	Proctor Allen	So
LB	38	Stan Beavers	Sr
LB	36	Dave Beavin	Sr
DL	96	Tommy Beck	So
DL	97	Brad Bourne	Jr
LB	32	Gary Carden	Jr
DL	94	Bobby Daffer	So
DE	99	Randy Duckworth	Sr
LB	60	Bruce Elliott	So
DB	28	Gary Faulkner	So
DB	30	Jeff Ford	Sr
DL	78	Joe Gaston	So
DL	92	Smylie Gebhart	Sr
DB	43	Mike McKenzie	So
LB	35	Steve Putnal	So
LB	37	Witt Wisman	So
S, WR	22	Joe Wolf	So

Special teams

Pos.	#	Name	Class

Head coach

- Bud Carson

Coordinators/assistant coaches

Legend

- (C) Team captain
- (S) Suspended
- (I) Ineligible
- Injured
- Redshirt
