= 1972 Sun Bowl =

American college football game

| North Carolina Tar Heels | Texas Tech Red Raiders |
| (10–1) | (8–3) |
| ACC | SWC |
| 32 | 28 |
| Head coach: Bill Dooley | Head coach: Jim Carlen |
| AP / Coaches; 16 / 14 |
| | 1 | 2 | 3 | 4 | Total |
|---|---|---|---|---|---|
| North Carolina | 3 | 6 | 7 | 16 | 32 |
| Texas Tech | 0 | 7 | 14 | 7 | 28 |
- Date: December 30, 1972
- Season: 1972
- Stadium: Sun Bowl
- Location: El Paso, Texas
- MVP: HB George Smith (Texas Tech)
- Referee: Burns McKinney (SWC) (split crew: SWC, ACC)

United States TV coverage
- Network: CBS
- Announcers: Lindsey Nelson; Irv Cross

The 1972 Sun Bowl was a college football postseason bowl game that featured the North Carolina Tar Heels and the Texas Tech Red Raiders.

== Background ==
A 29–14 loss to #5 Ohio State proved to be the Tar Heels' only loss of the season, as they went undefeated in conference play to win the Atlantic Coast Conference title for the second straight year. As for the Red Raiders, they had finished tied for second in the Southwest Conference, with a 24–14 loss to Arkansas on Thanksgiving especially damaging, as Tech had been ranked #20 before the loss.

== Game summary ==
Ellis Alexander gave the Tar Heels a 3–0 lead on his 32-yard field goal in the first quarter. A Dick Oliver 22-yard touchdown run made it 9-0 (with a missed extra point) in the 2nd. The Red Raiders scored a passing touchdown by Pat Barnes in the 2nd quarter to make it 9–7 at halftime. However, a touchdown they didn't make turned out to be important. On a North Carolina punt in the 2nd quarter, the kick was blocked and Red Raider Donald Rives returned it for an apparent touchdown, but it was called back due to an unsportsmanlike conduct penalty on a Tech coach being on the field during play. They took the lead on two touchdown runs by George Smith to make it 21–9. North Carolina responded with two touchdowns of their own. The first came on a Ted Leverenz touchdown catch from Nick Vidnovic touchdown pass from 62 yards out. The second came in the 4th quarter on a Billy Hite touchdown run, with the successful conversion making it 24–21. Tech responded Smith's third touchdown of the game to make it 28–24 with 7:41 left. Vidnovic and Leverenz responded once again with a touchdown throw that gave them the lead with a minute to go. When the Red Raiders got the ball back, Barnes was sacked in the endzone, making the score 32–28 as the Tar Heels ran out the rest of the clock to clinch the victory. Despite his team losing, George Smith was named MVP on 172 yards on 14 carries.

=== Scoring summary ===
- North Carolina – Alexander 32 FG
- North Carolina – Oliver 22 run (kick failed)
- Texas Tech – Tillman 15 pass from Barnes (Grimes kick)
- Texas Tech – Smith 65 run (Grimes kick)
- Texas Tech – Smith 46 run (Grimes kick)
- North Carolina – Leverenz 62 pass from Vidnovic (Alexander kick)
- North Carolina – Hite 3 run (Leverenz pass from Vidnovic)
- Texas Tech – Smith 5 run (Grimes kick)
- North Carolina – Leverenz 12 pass from Vidnovic (kick failed)
- North Carolina – Safety (Barnes tackled in end zone)

== Aftermath ==
The Tar Heels returned to the Sun Bowl two years later. The Red Raiders returned in 1993.

== Statistics ==
| Statistics | North Carolina | Texas Tech |
|---|---|---|
| First downs | 24 | 13 |
| Rushing yards | 238 | 293 |
| Passing yards | 215 | 94 |
| Interceptions thrown | 1 | 1 |
| Total offense | 453 | 387 |
| Return yardage | 18 | 105 |
| Punts–average | 9–38.8 | 6–25.8 |
| Fumbles–lost | 3–0 | 3–2 |
| Penalties–yards | 7–55 | 4–39 |
