= Al Michaels (American football coach) =

American football player, coach, and administrator (1911–1991)

Biographical details
- Born: November 14, 1911; DuBois, Pennsylvania, U.S.
- Died: October 17, 1991 (aged 79); Raleigh, North Carolina, U.S.

Playing career
- 1933–1934: Penn State
- Position: Quarterback

Coaching career (HC unless noted)
- 1935–1953: Penn State (assistant)
- 1954–1970: NC State (DC)
- 1971: NC State (interim HC)

Administrative career (AD unless noted)
- 1975–1977: NC State (assistant AD)

Head coaching record
- Overall: 3–8

Albert Paul Michaels (November 14, 1911 – October 17, 1991) was an American football player, coach, and college athletics administrator. As defensive coordinator for North Carolina State University under Earle Edwards from 1954 to 1970, he has long been considered one of the games most influential defensive minds with his famous "white shoes defense". He acted as interim head football coach for the 1971 team, hiring protégé Chuck Amato to his first full-time assistant job during his tenure as head coach.

A native of DuBois, Pennsylvania, Michaels played college football at Pennsylvania State University and coached there for 19 years before moving on to NC State. He also coached golf at NC State. Michaels died on October 17, 1991, in Raleigh, North Carolina, following a long illness.

== Head coaching record ==
Year	Team	Overall	Conference	Standing
NC State Wolfpack (Atlantic Coast Conference) (1971)
1971	NC State	3–8	2–5	7th
NC State:		3–8	2–5	
Total:		3–8		
