= 1971 North Carolina Tar Heels football team =

American college football season

1971 North Carolina Tar Heels football

ACC champion

Gator Bowl, L 3–7 vs. Georgia
- Conference: Atlantic Coast Conference

Ranking
- Coaches: No. 18
- Record: 9–3 (6–0 ACC)
- Head coach: Bill Dooley (5th season)
- Offensive coordinator: Bobby Collins (5th season)
- Defensive coordinator: Lee Hayley (5th season)
- Captains: John Bunting; Paul Miller
- Home stadium: Kenan Memorial Stadium

1971 Atlantic Coast Conference football standings
	Conf.					Overall
Team	W		L		T	W		L		T
North Carolina $	6	–	0	–	0	9	–	3	–	0
Clemson	4	–	2	–	0	5	–	6	–	0
Duke	2	–	3	–	0	6	–	5	–	0
Wake Forest	2	–	3	–	0	6	–	5	–	0
Virginia	2	–	3	–	0	3	–	8	–	0
NC State	2	–	4	–	0	3	–	8	–	0
Maryland	1	–	4	–	0	2	–	9	–	0
$ – Conference champion; Rankings from AP Poll

The 1971 North Carolina Tar Heels football team represented the North Carolina Tar Heels of University of North Carolina at Chapel Hill during the 1971 NCAA University Division football season. The Tar Heels were led by fifth-year head coach Bill Dooley and played their home games at Kenan Memorial Stadium. North Carolina won the Atlantic Coast Conference with a perfect conference record of 6–0. They were invited to the 1971 Gator Bowl, where they lost to Georgia.

== Schedule ==
Date	Time	Opponent	Rank	Site	TV	Result	Attendance	Source
September 11	8:00 p.m.	at Richmond*		City Stadium; Richmond, VA		W 28–0	16,000	
September 18	1:30 p.m.	at Illinois*		Memorial Stadium; Champaign, IL		W 27–0	49,591	
September 25	1:30 p.m.	Maryland		Kenan Memorial Stadium; Chapel Hill, NC		W 35–14	43,000	
October 2	1:50 p.m.	at NC State	No. 20	Carter Stadium; Raleigh, NC (rivalry)	ABC	W 27–7	35,000	
October 9	1:30 p.m.	Tulane*	No. 18	Kenan Memorial Stadium; Chapel Hill, NC		L 29–37	39,500	
October 16	1:30 p.m.	at No. 7 Notre Dame*		Notre Dame Stadium; Notre Dame, IN (rivalry)		L 0–16	59,075	
October 23	1:50 p.m.	Wake Forest		Kenan Memorial Stadium; Chapel Hill, NC (rivalry)	ABC	W 7–3	44,000	
October 30	1:30 p.m.	William & Mary*		Kenan Memorial Stadium; Chapel Hill, NC		W 36–35	38,500	
November 6	1:30 p.m.	Clemson		Kenan Memorial Stadium; Chapel Hill, NC		W 26–13	45,500	
November 13	1:30 p.m.	at Virginia		Scott Stadium; Charlottesville, VA (South's Oldest Rivalry)		W 32–20	18,450	
November 20	1:30 p.m.	at Duke		Wallace Wade Stadium; Durham, NC (Victory Bell)		W 38–0	51,500	
December 31	2:10 p.m.	vs. No. 6 Georgia*		Gator Bowl Stadium; Jacksonville, FL (Gator Bowl)	NBC	L 3–7	71,208	
*Non-conference game; Rankings from AP Poll released prior to the game; All times are in Eastern time
