= 1971 West Texas State Buffaloes football team =

American college football season

1971 West Texas State Buffaloes football
- Conference: Missouri Valley Conference
- Record: 2–9 (1–4 MVC)
- Head coach: Gene Mayfield (1st season)
- Home stadium: Kimbrough Memorial Stadium

1971 Missouri Valley Conference football standings
	Conf.					Overall
Team	W		L		T	W		L		T
Memphis State $	4	–	1	–	0	5	–	6	–	0
Louisville	3	–	2	–	0	6	–	3	–	1
Tulsa	3	–	2	–	0	4	–	7	–	0
North Texas State	3	–	2	–	0	3	–	8	–	0
Drake	2	–	3	–	0	7	–	4	–	0
West Texas State	1	–	4	–	0	2	–	9	–	0
Wichita State	0	–	5	–	0	3	–	8	–	0
New Mexico State *	0	–	0	–	0	5	–	5	–	1
$ – Conference champion; * – New Mexico State was ineligible for conference play, but its games against Drake, North Texas State, West Texas State, and Wichita State counted in the conference standings for its opponents. Drake's game against Tampa, Memphis State's games against Cincinnati and Southern Miss, and Tulsa's games against BYU and Virginia Tech were also designated as conference games.

The 1971 West Texas State Buffaloes football team was an American football team that represented West Texas State University—now known as West Texas A&M University—as a member of the Missouri Valley Conference (MVC) during the 1971 NCAA University Division football season. In their first year under head coach Gene Mayfield, the Buffaloes compiled an overall record of 2–9 record with a mark of 1–4 in conference play, placing sixth the MVC.

== Schedule ==
Date	Time	Opponent	Site	Result	Attendance	Source
September 11		at Memphis State	Memphis Memorial Stadium; Memphis, TN	L 0–30	21,412	
September 18	8:00 p.m.	Lamar*	Kimbrough Memorial Stadium; Canyon, TX	W 14–6	10,200	
October 2	8:00 p.m.	Tulsa	Kimbrough Memorial Stadium; Canyon, TX	L 13–17	15,000	
October 9	8:00 p.m.	UT Arlington*	Kimbrough Memorial Stadium; Canyon, TX	L 0–13	10,000	
October 16	8:00 p.m.	Northern Illinois*	Kimbrough Memorial Stadium; Canyon, TX	L 19–22	11,500	
October 23	8:00 p.m.	Idaho*^{†}	Kimbrough Memorial Stadium; Canyon, TX	L 0–26	13,500–14,000	
October 30	7:34 p.m.	at Wichita State	Cessna Stadium; Wichita, KS	W 31–14	11,537	
November 6		at New Mexico State (Note: Designated conference game)	Memorial Stadium; Las Cruces, NM	L 24–50	12,330–12,335	
November 13	2:00 p.m.	at Colorado State*	Hughes Stadium; Fort Collins, CO	L 14–36	13,348	
November 20	8:00 p.m.	Drake	Kimbrough Memorial Stadium; Canyon, TX	L 28–32	6,000	
November 27		at Southern Miss*	Faulkner Field; Hattiesburg, MS	L 9–10	5,300	
*Non-conference game; ^{†}Homecoming; All times are in Central time
