= 1971 Baylor Bears football team =

American college football season

1971 Baylor Bears football
- Conference: Southwest Conference
- Record: 1–9 (0–7 SWC)
- Head coach: Bill Beall (3rd season)
- Home stadium: Baylor Stadium

1971 Southwest Conference football standings
	Conf.					Overall
Team	W		L		T	W		L		T
No. 18 Texas $	6	–	1	–	0	8	–	3	–	0
No. 16 Arkansas	5	–	1	–	1	8	–	3	–	1
TCU	5	–	2	–	0	6	–	4	–	1
Texas A&M	4	–	3	–	0	5	–	6	–	0
SMU	3	–	4	–	0	4	–	7	–	0
Rice	2	–	4	–	1	3	–	7	–	1
Texas Tech	2	–	5	–	0	4	–	7	–	0
Baylor	0	–	7	–	0	1	–	9	–	0
$ – Conference champion; Rankings from AP Poll

The 1971 Baylor Bears football team represented the Baylor University in the 1971 NCAA University Division football season. The Bears offense scored 74 points, while the Bears defense allowed 236 points. In the Battle of the Brazos, Texas A&M beat the Bears by a score of 10–9.

The season turned tragic during the Oct. 30 game vs. TCU when Horned Frogs coach Jim Pittman suffered a massive heart attack in the first quarter. He was declared dead less than an hour later at Baylor Medical Center.

== Schedule ==
Date	Time	Opponent	Site	Result	Attendance	Source
September 18		at Kansas*	Memorial Stadium; Lawrence, KS	L 0–22	36,362	
September 25		Indiana*	Baylor Stadium; Waco, TX	W 10–0	27,500	
October 1	7:14 p.m.	at Miami (FL)*	Miami Orange Bowl; Miami, FL	L 15–41	26,876	
October 9		No. 17 Arkansas	Baylor Stadium; Waco, TX	L 7–35	33,000	
October 23		at Texas A&M	Kyle Field; College Station, TX (rivalry)	L 9–10	28,662	
October 30		TCU^{†}	Baylor Stadium; Waco, TX (rivalry)	L 27–34	30,000	
November 6		at No. 15 Texas	Memorial Stadium; Austin, TX (rivalry)	L 0–24	54,500	
November 13		at Texas Tech	Jones Stadium; Lubbock, TX (rivalry)	L 0–27	32,169	
November 20		SMU	Baylor Stadium; Waco, TX	L 6–20	25,000	
November 27		at Rice	Rice Stadium; Houston, TX	L 0–23	15,000	
*Non-conference game; ^{†}Homecoming; Rankings from AP Poll released prior to the game; All times are in Central time
