= 1971 New Mexico State Aggies football team =

American college football season

1971 New Mexico State Aggies football
- Conference: Missouri Valley Conference
- Record: 5–5–1 (0–0 MVC)
- Head coach: Jim Wood (4th season)
- Home stadium: Memorial Stadium

1971 Missouri Valley Conference football standings
	Conf.					Overall
Team	W		L		T	W		L		T
Memphis State $	4	–	1	–	0	5	–	6	–	0
Louisville	3	–	2	–	0	6	–	3	–	1
Tulsa	3	–	2	–	0	4	–	7	–	0
North Texas State	3	–	2	–	0	3	–	8	–	0
Drake	2	–	3	–	0	7	–	4	–	0
West Texas State	1	–	4	–	0	2	–	9	–	0
Wichita State	0	–	5	–	0	3	–	8	–	0
New Mexico State *	0	–	0	–	0	5	–	5	–	1
$ – Conference champion; * – New Mexico State was ineligible for conference play, but its games against Drake, North Texas State, West Texas State, and Wichita State counted in the conference standings for its opponents. Drake's game against Tampa, Memphis State's games against Cincinnati and Southern Miss, and Tulsa's games against BYU and Virginia Tech were also designated as conference games.

The 1971 New Mexico State Aggies football team was an American football team that represented New Mexico State University as a member of the Missouri Valley Conference (MVC) during the 1971 NCAA University Division football season. In their fourth year under head coach Jim Wood, the Aggies compiled a 5–5–1 record and outscored opponents by a total of 220 to 208. New Mexico State was ineligible for MVC play until 1972. The team played home games at home games at Memorial Stadium in Las Cruces, New Mexico.

== Schedule ==
Date	Time	Opponent	Site	Result	Attendance	Source
September 11		Drake*	Memorial Stadium; Las Cruces, NM	W 7–3	13,241	
September 18		at Utah State*	Romney Stadium; Logan, UT	L 0–34	10,378	
September 25		North Texas State*	Memorial Stadium; Las Cruces, NM	W 10–0	10,160	
October 2		at SMU*	Cotton Bowl; Dallas, TX	L 25–28	31,120	
October 9		at New Mexico*	University Stadium; Albuquerque, NM (rivalry)	T 35–35	26,882	
October 16		UTEP*	Memorial Stadium; Las Cruces, NM (rivalry)	L 7–14	14,682	
October 23	6:30 p.m.	at UT Arlington*	Turnpike Stadium; Arlington, TX	W 20–6	8,500	
October 30		Idaho*	Memorial Stadium; Las Cruces, NM	L 14–19	7,650	
November 6		West Texas State*	Memorial Stadium; Las Cruces, NM	W 50–24	12,335	
November 13		at Wichita State*	Cessna Stadium; Wichita, KS	W 31–7	12,254	
November 27		at Colorado State*	Hughes Stadium; Fort Collins, CO	L 21–38	9,475	
*Non-conference game; All times are in Mountain time
