= 1971 Fiesta Bowl =

American college football game

- 1st Fiesta Bowl
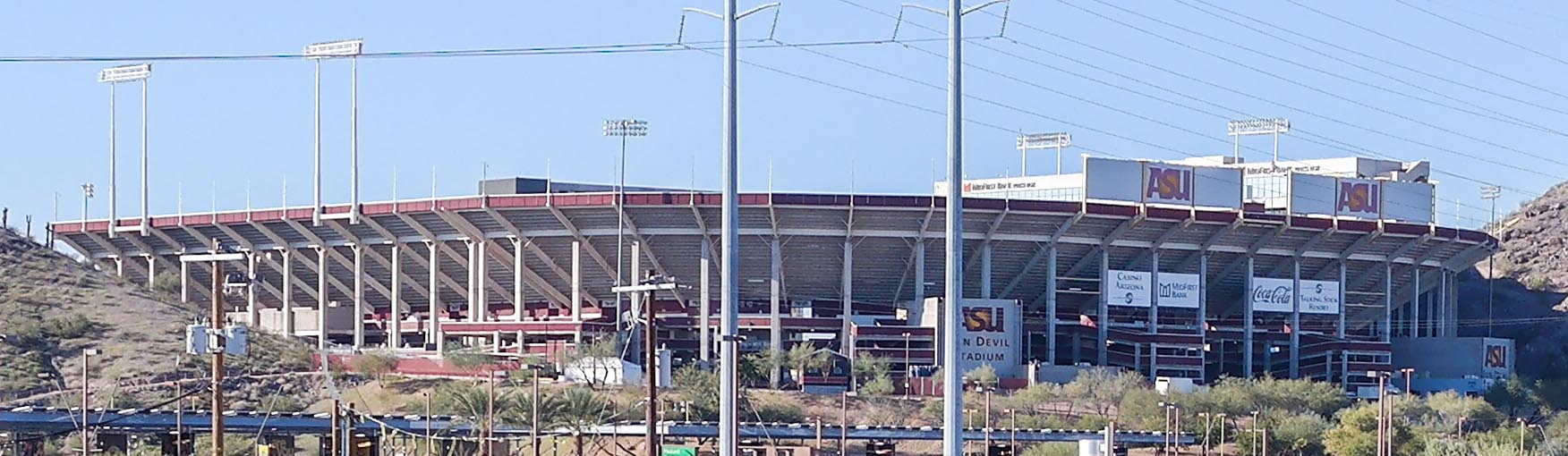
- Sun Devil Stadium in Tempe, Arizona, hosted the Fiesta Bowl.
| Florida State Seminoles | Arizona State Sun Devils |
| (8–3) | (10–1) |
| Independent | WAC |
| 38 | 45 |
| Head coach: Larry Jones | Head coach: Frank Kush |
| AP / Coaches; NR / 19 | AP / Coaches; 8 / 6 |
| | 1 | 2 | 3 | 4 | Total |
|---|---|---|---|---|---|
| Florida State | 10 | 18 | 0 | 10 | 38 |
| Arizona State | 7 | 14 | 10 | 14 | 45 |
- Date: December 27, 1971
- Season: 1971
- Stadium: Sun Devil Stadium
- Location: Tempe, Arizona
- MVP: Gary Huff (Florida State QB); Junior Ah You (Arizona State DE)
- Favorite: Arizona State by 9½ points
- Referee: Harvey Murdock (WAC) (split crew: WAC, SEC)
- Attendance: 51,098

United States TV coverage
- Network: Mizlou
- Announcers: Ray Scott and Eddie Doucette

The 1971 Fiesta Bowl was the inaugural edition of the college football bowl game, played at Sun Devil Stadium in Tempe, Arizona, on Monday, December 27. Part of the 1971–72 bowl game season, it featured the eighth-ranked Arizona State Sun Devils of the Western Athletic Conference (WAC) and the independent Florida State Seminoles. Arizona State broke a tie late in the fourth quarter to win, 45–38.

== Background ==
The Fiesta Bowl had been created as a bowl game for the Western Athletic Conference (WAC) champion to participate in, the first to take place for the 1971 season.

== Teams ==
=== Arizona State ===
The Sun Devils won their third consecutive WAC title (with an undefeated conference record for the second time in three years). The previous season, ASU won the Peach Bowl, their first bowl appearance in two decades.

=== Florida State ===
Florida State was an independent in Coach Jones' first year at the program. A 5–0 start had made the Seminoles ranked #19, but later losses to Florida, Houston, and Georgia Tech knocked them out of the polls. This was Florida State's first bowl appearance in three years, as they looked for their first bowl win since January 1965.

== Game summary ==
The game kicked off shortly after 1 p.m. MST, and was televised by Mizlou.

Calvin Demery started the scoring when he caught a touchdown pass from Danny White to give ASU an early lead, but Florida State would tie the game with a Paul Magalski touchdown run and take the lead later in the quarter with a field goal. Woody Green took the lead back for the Sun Devils with his touchdown run in the second quarter, but FSU added a field goal to narrow the lead to one. Later in the quarter, Rhett Dawson caught a pass from Kent Gaydos (normally the wide receiver) for a touchdown to give the Seminoles the lead again, with a successful conversion attempt to make it 21–14. But the Sun Devils tied the game with a Steve Holden touchdown catch from White to make it tied at 21–21. Dawson caught another touchdown, this time from quarterback Gary Huff, to give the Seminoles the lead again, and the Sun Devils went into halftime down 28–21.

Arizona State started off small in the second half with an Eckstrand field goal, but later in the quarter Green put the Sun Devils ahead on his second touchdown run. Florida State tied the game with a Frank Fontes field goal in the fourth quarter. Later in the quarter, Florida State punted the ball to Holden, who returned it 58 yards for a touchdown to give Arizona State the lead 38–31. Dawson caught his third touchdown of the day to tie the game at 38. With 4:44 to play after the kickoff, the Sun Devils needed to score to win the game while giving the Noles little time, which they did as Green ran for his third touchdown of the day to give the Arizona State the lead with 34 seconds left. The Seminoles could not muster any more magic as the Sun Devils won their second consecutive bowl game and the first Fiesta Bowl. Woody Green went 101 yards on 24 carries and caught 2 passes for 41 yards for ASU, though FSU's Huff was named Offensive MVP, throwing 25 of 46 yards for 347 yards, throwing two touchdowns and interceptions.

== Statistics ==
| Statistics | Florida State | Arizona State |
|---|---|---|
| First downs | 20 | 26 |
| Yards rushing | 34–122 | 56–246 |
| Yards passing | 361 | 250 |
| Passing | 24–47–2 | 15–30–0 |
| Return yards | 16 | 107 |
| Total Offense | 81–483 | 86–496 |
| Punts–Average | 7–42 | 6–37 |
| Fumbles–Lost | 2–0 | 5–2 |
| Turnovers | 2 | 2 |
| Penalties–Yards | 8–91 | 4–37 |

== Aftermath ==
It took six years and the firing of two coaches before the Seminoles returned to another bowl game, which they did under Bobby Bowden. This was their last Fiesta Bowl until 1988. The Sun Devils went to two straight Fiesta Bowls while winning two more WAC titles and ultimately five in the 1970s. The schools would next play in the 1979 regular season, and would next meet in a bowl game in the 2019 Sun Bowl.
