= 1971 Memphis State Tigers football team =

American college football season

1971 Memphis State Tigers football

MVC champion Pasadena Bowl champion

Pasadena Bowl, W 28–9 vs. San Jose State
- Conference: Missouri Valley Conference
- Record: 5–6 (4–1 MVC)
- Head coach: Billy J. Murphy (14th season)
- Home stadium: Memphis Memorial Stadium

1971 Missouri Valley Conference football standings
	Conf.					Overall
Team	W		L		T	W		L		T
Memphis State $	4	–	1	–	0	5	–	6	–	0
Louisville	3	–	2	–	0	6	–	3	–	1
Tulsa	3	–	2	–	0	4	–	7	–	0
North Texas State	3	–	2	–	0	3	–	8	–	0
Drake	2	–	3	–	0	7	–	4	–	0
West Texas State	1	–	4	–	0	2	–	9	–	0
Wichita State	0	–	5	–	0	3	–	8	–	0
New Mexico State *	0	–	0	–	0	5	–	5	–	1
$ – Conference champion; * – New Mexico State was ineligible for conference play, but its games against Drake, North Texas State, West Texas State, and Wichita State counted in the conference standings for its opponents. Drake's game against Tampa, Memphis State's games against Cincinnati and Southern Miss, and Tulsa's games against BYU and Virginia Tech were also designated as conference games.

The 1971 Memphis State Tigers football team represented Memphis State University (now known as the University of Memphis) as a member of the Missouri Valley Conference (MVC) during the 1971 NCAA University Division football season. In its 14th and final season under head coach Billy J. Murphy, the team compiled an overall record of 5–6 record with a mark of 4–1 in conference play, winning he MVC title. Memphis State defeated San Jose State in the Pasadena Bowl, and outscored all opponents by a total of 255 to 202. The team played its home games at Memphis Memorial Stadium in Memphis, Tennessee.

The team's statistical leaders included John Robison with 496 passing yards, Paul Gowen with 644 rushing yards and Paul Gowen with 42 points scored, and Stan Davis with 509 receiving yards.

== Schedule ==
Date	Time	Opponent	Site	Result	Attendance	Source
September 11		West Texas State	Memphis Memorial Stadium; Memphis, TN	W 30–0	21,412	
September 18	7:30 p.m.	Ole Miss*	Memphis Memorial Stadium; Memphis, TN (rivalry)	L 21–49	50,164	
October 2		South Carolina*	Memphis Memorial Stadium; Memphis, TN	L 3–7	20,666	
October 9		Louisville	Memphis Memorial Stadium; Memphis, TN (rivalry)	L 20–26	20,559	
October 16	2:30 p.m.	at Utah State*	Romney Stadium; Logan, UT	L 6–7	5,041	
October 23		Southern Miss (Note: Designated conference game)	Memphis Memorial Stadium; Memphis, TN (rivalry)	W 27–12	19,494	
October 30	1:00 p.m.	at Cincinnati	Nippert Stadium; Cincinnati, OH (rivalry)	W 45–21	17,020	
November 6		No. 19 Houston*^{†}	Memphis Memorial Stadium; Memphis, TN	L 7–35	10,132	
November 13		North Texas State	Memphis Memorial Stadium; Memphis, TN	W 47–8	13,788	
November 20		Kansas State*	Memphis Memorial Stadium; Memphis, TN	L 21–28	17,234	
December 18		vs. San Jose State*	Rose Bowl; Pasadena, CA (Pasadena Bowl)	W 28–9	15,244	
*Non-conference game; ^{†}Homecoming; Rankings from AP Poll released prior to the game; All times are in Central time
