= 1971 TCU Horned Frogs football team =

American college football season

1971 TCU Horned Frogs football
- Conference: Southwest Conference
- Record: 6–4–1 (5–2 SWC)
- Head coach: Jim Pittman (1st season; first 7 games); Billy Tohill (1st season; final 4 games)
- Offensive coordinator: Russell Coffee (1st season)
- Offensive scheme: Spread
- Base defense: 4-4
- Home stadium: Amon G. Carter Stadium

1971 Southwest Conference football standings
	Conf.					Overall
Team	W		L		T	W		L		T
No. 18 Texas $	6	–	1	–	0	8	–	3	–	0
No. 16 Arkansas	5	–	1	–	1	8	–	3	–	1
TCU	5	–	2	–	0	6	–	4	–	1
Texas A&M	4	–	3	–	0	5	–	6	–	0
SMU	3	–	4	–	0	4	–	7	–	0
Rice	2	–	4	–	1	3	–	7	–	1
Texas Tech	2	–	5	–	0	4	–	7	–	0
Baylor	0	–	7	–	0	1	–	9	–	0
$ – Conference champion; Rankings from AP Poll

The 1971 TCU Horned Frogs football team represented Texas Christian University (TCU) in the 1971 NCAA University Division football season. The Horned Frogs finished the season 6–4–1 overall and 5–2 in the Southwest Conference. The team was coached by Jim Pittman, in his first and only year as head coach. Pittman, previously head coach at Tulane for five seasons, died of a heart attack suffered on the sidelines of a game against Baylor in Waco, Texas on October 30, 1971. Assistant coach Billy Tohill replaced Pittman as head coach for the remainder of the season, finishing with a 3–1 record. This was the Horned Frogs' last winning season until 1984.

TCU played home games on campus, at Amon G. Carter Stadium, in Fort Worth, Texas.

== Schedule ==
Date	Time	Opponent	Site	Result	Attendance	Source
September 18	7:30 p.m.	UT Arlington*	Amon G. Carter Stadium; Fort Worth, TX	W 42–0	20,868	
September 25		at No. 17 Washington*	Husky Stadium; Seattle, WA	L 26–44	59,900–59,956	
October 2		at No. 18 Arkansas	Razorback Stadium; Fayetteville, AR	L 15–49	41,100	
October 9		Oklahoma State*	Amon G. Carter Stadium; Fort Worth, TX	T 14–14	21,232	
October 16		Texas A&M	Amon G. Carter Stadium; Fort Worth, TX (rivalry)	W 14–3	31,910	
October 23		at No. 7 Penn State*	Beaver Stadium; University Park, PA	L 14–66	51,896	
October 30		at Baylor	Baylor Stadium; Waco, TX (rivalry)	W 34–27	30,000	
November 6		Texas Tech	Amon G. Carter Stadium; Fort Worth, TX (rivalry)	W 17–6	22,138	
November 13		at No. 13 Texas	Memorial Stadium; Austin, TX (rivalry)	L 0–31	63,500	
November 20		Rice	Amon G. Carter Stadium; Fort Worth, TX	W 20–19	19,412	
November 27		at SMU	Cotton Bowl; Dallas, TX (rivalry)	W 18–16	18,128	
*Non-conference game; Rankings from AP Poll released prior to the game; All times are in Central time

== Game summaries ==
=== At Baylor ===
	1	2	3	4	Total
Horned Frogs	7	13	7	7	34
Bears	7	13	7	0	27

== Roster ==
1971 TCU Horned Frogs football team roster
Players
Coaches
Offense George Duchene QB So

Pos.	#	Name	Class
QB	18	Steve Judy	Sr
G	76	Guy Morriss	Jr

Defense

Pos.	#	Name	Class
DB	25	Lyle Blackwood	Jr
DT	71	Charles Davis	So
DB	27	Dave McGinnis	Jr

Special teams

Pos.	#	Name	Class

Head coach

- Jim Pittman
- Billy Tohill

Coordinators/assistant coaches

Legend

- (C) Team captain
- (S) Suspended
- (I) Ineligible
- Injured
- Redshirt
