= 1971 Arizona State Sun Devils football team =

American college football season

1971 Arizona State Sun Devils football

WAC champion Fiesta Bowl champion

Fiesta Bowl, W 45–38 vs. Florida State
- Conference: Western Athletic Conference

Ranking
- Coaches: No. 6
- AP: No. 8
- Record: 11–1 (7–0 WAC)
- Head coach: Frank Kush (14th season)
- Defensive coordinator: Larry Kentera (1st season)
- Home stadium: Sun Devil Stadium

1971 Western Athletic Conference football standings
| | Conf. | | | | | Overall |
| Team | W | | L | | T | W | | L | | T |
|---|---|---|---|---|---|---|---|---|---|---|
| No. 8 Arizona State $ | 7 | – | 0 | – | 0 | 11 | – | 1 | – | 0 |
| New Mexico | 5 | – | 1 | – | 0 | 6 | – | 3 | – | 2 |
| Arizona | 3 | – | 3 | – | 0 | 5 | – | 6 | – | 0 |
| BYU | 3 | – | 4 | – | 0 | 5 | – | 6 | – | 0 |
| Wyoming | 3 | – | 4 | – | 0 | 5 | – | 6 | – | 0 |
| Utah | 3 | – | 4 | – | 0 | 3 | – | 8 | – | 0 |
| Colorado State | 1 | – | 4 | – | 0 | 3 | – | 8 | – | 0 |
| UTEP | 1 | – | 6 | – | 0 | 5 | – | 6 | – | 0 |
$ – Conference champion; Rankings from AP Poll

The 1971 Arizona State Sun Devils football team represented Arizona State University in the 1971 NCAA University Division football season. The offense scored 462 points while the defense allowed 201 points. Led by head coach Frank Kush, the Sun Devils won the Fiesta Bowl.

== Schedule ==
| Date | Time | Opponent | Rank | Site | TV | Result | Attendance | Source |
|---|---|---|---|---|---|---|---|---|
| September 18 | | No. 20 Houston* | No. 16 | Sun Devil Stadium; Tempe, AZ | | W 18–17 | 50,446 | |
| September 25 | | at Utah | No. 15 | Ute Stadium; Salt Lake City, UT | | W 41–21 | 24,068 | |
| October 2 | | UTEP | No. 13 | Sun Devil Stadium; Tempe, AZ | | W 24–7 | 50,530 | |
| October 9 | | at Colorado State | No. 12 | Hughes Stadium; Fort Collins, CO | | W 42–0 | 25,101 | |
| October 16 | | at Oregon State* | No. 11 | Civic Stadium; Portland, OR | | L 18–24 | 30,233 | |
| October 23 | | at New Mexico | No. 11 | University Stadium; Albuquerque, NM | | W 60–28 | 26,020 | |
| October 30 | 7:30 p.m. | No. 18 Air Force* | No. 13 | Sun Devil Stadium; Tempe, AZ | | W 44–28 | 50,380 | |
| November 6 | | BYU | No. 10 | Sun Devil Stadium; Tempe, AZ | | W 38–13 | 50,341 | |
| November 13 | | Wyoming | No. 9 | Sun Devil Stadium; Tempe, AZ | | W 52–19 | 50,347 | |
| November 20 | 8:30 p.m. | at San Jose State* | No. 9 | Spartan Stadium; San Jose, CA | | W 49–6 | 23,500 | |
| November 27 | | Arizona | No. 9 | Sun Devil Stadium; Tempe, AZ (rivalry) | | W 31–0 | 50,370 | |
| December 27 | | vs. Florida State* | No. 8 | Sun Devil Stadium; Tempe, AZ (Fiesta Bowl) | Mizlou | W 45–38 | 51,098 | |
*Non-conference game; Rankings from AP Poll released prior to the game; All times are in Mountain time

== Season summary ==
=== at New Mexico ===
- Danny White 6 TD passes

External videos
- 1971 Arizona State at New Mexico - Pac-12 highlights

=== Arizona ===
Arizona Wildcats (5–5) at #9 Arizona State Sun Devils (9–1)

| Quarter | 1 | 2 | 3 | 4 | Total |
|---|---|---|---|---|---|
| Arizona | 0 | 0 | 0 | 0 | 0 |
| Arizona St | 10 | 21 | 0 | 0 | 31 |

at Sun Devil Stadium, Tempe, Arizona

- Date: November 27
- Game attendance: 50,370

Arizona State allowed Arizona past midfield just twice all game.

The first came late in the second quarter when Arizona S Bob White intercepted a pass at his own 33 and returned it to ASU 47. After being stopped at the 13, Arizona missed the field goal.

Late in the fourth quarter, Arizona drove to into ASU territory but Windlan Hall intercepted a pass in the end zone to preserve the shutout.

Arizona St got on the scoreboard early in the first on a 19-yard touchdown pass from QB Danny White to TE Joe Petty. As the quarter ended, Don Eckstrand kicked a 22-yard field goal to make it 10-0.

Arizona State scored three more touchdowns before halftime.

== Personnel ==
1971 Arizona State Sun Devils football team roster
Players
Coaches
Offense

| Pos. | # | Name | Class |
|---|---|---|---|
| OT | 76 | Roger Davis | Sr |
| TE | 30 | Calvin Demery | Sr |
| FB | 40 | Oscar Dragon | Sr |
| OT | 79 | Ed Fisher | Sr |
| RB | 22 | Woody Green | So |
| WR | 25 | Steve Holden | Jr |
| C | 51 | Ron Lou | Jr |
| FB | 43 | Brent McClanahan | Jr |
| TE | 88 | Joe Petty | Jr |
| C | 63 | Mike Tomco | Sr |
| QB | 11 | Danny White | So |

Defense

| Pos. | # | Name | Class |
|---|---|---|---|
| DE | 82 | Junior Ah You | Sr |
| LB | 53 | Bob Carter |
| S | 21 | Mike Clupper | Sr |
| DE | 86 | Joe Connolly | Sr |
| DT | 71 | Rich Gray | Sr |
| DB | 31 | Windlan Hall | Sr |
| DB | 35 | Ron Lumpkin | Jr |
| S | 36 | Prentice McCray | Jr |
| DT | 62 | Ted Olivo | Sr |

Special teams

| Pos. | # | Name | Class |
|---|---|---|---|
| K | 13 | Don Ekstrand | Sr |

Head coach

- Frank Kush (14th year)

Coordinators/assistant coaches

Legend

- (C) Team captain
- (S) Suspended
- (I) Ineligible
- Injured
- Redshirt

== 1972 NFL draft ==
The following players were claimed in the 1972 NFL draft.

| Player | Position | Round | Pick | NFL club |
|---|---|---|---|---|
| Windlan Hall | Defensive back | 4 | 96 | San Francisco 49ers |
