= 1971 Wichita State Shockers football team =

American college football season

1971 Wichita State Shockers football
- Conference: Missouri Valley Conference
- Record: 3–8 (0–5 MVC)
- Head coach: Bob Seaman (2nd season)
- Home stadium: Cessna Stadium

1971 Missouri Valley Conference football standings
	Conf.					Overall
Team	W		L		T	W		L		T
Memphis State $	4	–	1	–	0	5	–	6	–	0
Louisville	3	–	2	–	0	6	–	3	–	1
Tulsa	3	–	2	–	0	4	–	7	–	0
North Texas State	3	–	2	–	0	3	–	8	–	0
Drake	2	–	3	–	0	7	–	4	–	0
West Texas State	1	–	4	–	0	2	–	9	–	0
Wichita State	0	–	5	–	0	3	–	8	–	0
New Mexico State *	0	–	0	–	0	5	–	5	–	1
$ – Conference champion; * – New Mexico State was ineligible for conference play, but its games against Drake, North Texas State, West Texas State, and Wichita State counted in the conference standings for its opponents. Drake's game against Tampa, Memphis State's games against Cincinnati and Southern Miss, and Tulsa's games against BYU and Virginia Tech were also designated as conference games.

The 1971 Wichita Shockers football team was an American football team that represented Wichita State University as a member of the Missouri Valley Conference (MVC) during the 1971 NCAA University Division football season. In its second season under head coach Bob Seaman, the team compiled an overall record of 3–8 record with mark of 0–5 in conference play, finished last out of seven teams in the MVC, and was outscored by a total of 268 to 149. The team played its home games at Cessna Stadium in Wichita, Kansas.

During the prior season, the team lost 14 of its players and its head coach in the Wichita State University football team plane crash. Several players injured in the crash, including Randy Jackson, returned to play for the 1971 team.

The team's statistical leaders included Tom Owen with 613 passing yards, Randy Jackson with 820 rushing yards and 48 points scored, Bill Moore with 318 receiving yards.

== Schedule ==
Date	Time	Opponent	Site	Result	Attendance	Source
September 11		at Texas A&M*	Kyle Field; College Station, TX	L 7–41	29,580	
September 18	7:35 p.m.	Arkansas State*	Cessna Stadium; Wichita, KS	L 14–16	13,250	
September 25	7:35 p.m.	Trinity (TX)*	Cessna Stadium; Wichita, KS	W 12–8	20,011	
October 2	7:30 p.m.	at Southern Illinois*	McAndrew Stadium; Carbondale, IL	W 26–24	10,500	
October 16	12:30 p.m.	at Cincinnati*	Nippert Stadium; Cincinnati, OH	L 7–20	11,406	
October 23	1:01 p.m.	at Louisville	Fairgrounds Stadium; Louisville, KY	L 5–21	14,176	
October 30	7:34 p.m.	West Texas State	Cessna Stadium; Wichita, KS	L 14–31	11,537	
November 6	2:02 p.m.	Colorado State*	Cessna Stadium; Wichita, KS	W 34–14	11,214	
November 13		New Mexico State (Note: Designated conference game)	Cessna Stadium; Wichita, KS	L 7–31	12,254	
November 20	1:30 p.m.	at North Texas State	Texas Stadium; Irving, TX	L 10–31	10,000	
November 27		Tulsa	Cessna Stadium; Wichita, KS	L 13–31	7,835	
*Non-conference game; All times are in Central time
