= 1971 Drake Bulldogs football team =

American college football season

1971 Drake Bulldogs football
- Conference: Missouri Valley Conference
- Record: 7–4 (2–3 MVC)
- Head coach: Jack Wallace (7th season)
- Home stadium: Drake Stadium

1971 Missouri Valley Conference football standings
| | Conf. | | | | | Overall |
| Team | W | | L | | T | W | | L | | T |
|---|---|---|---|---|---|---|---|---|---|---|
| Memphis State $ | 4 | – | 1 | – | 0 | 5 | – | 6 | – | 0 |
| Louisville | 3 | – | 2 | – | 0 | 6 | – | 3 | – | 1 |
| Tulsa | 3 | – | 2 | – | 0 | 4 | – | 7 | – | 0 |
| North Texas State | 3 | – | 2 | – | 0 | 3 | – | 8 | – | 0 |
| Drake | 2 | – | 3 | – | 0 | 7 | – | 4 | – | 0 |
| West Texas State | 1 | – | 4 | – | 0 | 2 | – | 9 | – | 0 |
| Wichita State | 0 | – | 5 | – | 0 | 3 | – | 8 | – | 0 |
| New Mexico State * | 0 | – | 0 | – | 0 | 5 | – | 5 | – | 1 |
$ – Conference champion; * – New Mexico State was ineligible for conference play, but its games against Drake, North Texas State, West Texas State, and Wichita State counted in the conference standings for its opponents. Drake's game against Tampa, Memphis State's games against Cincinnati and Southern Miss, and Tulsa's games against BYU and Virginia Tech were also designated as conference games.

The 1971 Drake Bulldogs football team represented the Drake University as a member of the Missouri Valley Conference (MVC) during the 1971 NCAA University Division football season. Led by Jack Wallace in his seventh season as head coach, the Bulldogs compiled an overall record of 2–9 with a mark of 2–3 in conference play, and finished fifth in the MVC. Drake played home games at Drake Stadium in Des Moines, Iowa.

== Schedule ==
| Date | Time | Opponent | Site | Result | Attendance | Source |
|---|---|---|---|---|---|---|
| September 11 | | at New Mexico State | Memorial Stadium; Las Cruces, NM | L 3–7 | 13,241 | |
| September 18 | | Abilene Christian* | Drake Stadium; Des Moines, IA | W 34–17 | 11,500 | |
| September 25 | 2:00 p.m. | Louisville | Drake Stadium; Des Moines, IA | W 10–7 | 12,300 | |
| October 2 | | at Northern Arizona* | Lumberjack Stadium; Flagstaff, AZ | W 38–13 | 4,475 | |
| October 9 | | Northern Iowa* | Drake Stadium; Des Moines, IA (rivalry) | W 28–0 | 13,000 | |
| October 16 | | No. 8 Tampa (Note: Designated conference game) | Drake Stadium; Des Moines, IA | L 2–36 | 15,200 | |
| October 23 | | South Dakota* | Drake Stadium; Des Moines, IA | W 49–7 | 6,800 | |
| October 30 | 2:00 p.m. | at North Texas State | Fouts Field; Denton, TX | L 12–21 | 12,350 | |
| November 6 | | at Southern Illinois* | McAndrew Stadium; Carbondale, IL | L 32–34 | 9,500 | |
| November 13 | | at Indiana State* | Memorial Stadium; Terre Haute, IN | W 27–15 | 8,746 | |
| November 20 | 8:00 p.m. | at West Texas State | Kimbrough Memorial Stadium; Canyon, TX | W 32–28 | 6,000 | |
*Non-conference game; Rankings from AP Poll released prior to the game; All times are in Central time
