= 1971 Louisville Cardinals football team =

American college football season

1971 Louisville Cardinals football
- Conference: Missouri Valley Conference
- Record: 6–3–1 (3–2 MVC)
- Head coach: Lee Corso (3rd season)
- Home stadium: Fairgrounds Stadium

1971 Missouri Valley Conference football standings
	Conf.					Overall
Team	W		L		T	W		L		T
Memphis State $	4	–	1	–	0	5	–	6	–	0
Louisville	3	–	2	–	0	6	–	3	–	1
Tulsa	3	–	2	–	0	4	–	7	–	0
North Texas State	3	–	2	–	0	3	–	8	–	0
Drake	2	–	3	–	0	7	–	4	–	0
West Texas State	1	–	4	–	0	2	–	9	–	0
Wichita State	0	–	5	–	0	3	–	8	–	0
New Mexico State *	0	–	0	–	0	5	–	5	–	1
$ – Conference champion; * – New Mexico State was ineligible for conference play, but its games against Drake, North Texas State, West Texas State, and Wichita State counted in the conference standings for its opponents. Drake's game against Tampa, Memphis State's games against Cincinnati and Southern Miss, and Tulsa's games against BYU and Virginia Tech were also designated as conference games.

The 1971 Louisville Cardinals football team was an American football team that represented the University of Louisville in the Missouri Valley Conference (MVC) during the 1971 NCAA University Division football season. In their third season under head coach Lee Corso, the Cardinals compiled a 6–3–1 record (3–2 against conference opponents) and outscored opponents by a total of 190 to 111.

The team's statistical leaders included John Madeya with 1,045 passing yards, Howard Stevens with 1,429 rushing yards and 78 points scored, and Gary Barnes with 404 receiving yards.

== Schedule ==
Date	Time	Opponent	Site	Result	Attendance	Source
September 18	8:32 p.m.	at Vanderbilt*	Dudley Field; Nashville, TN	T 0–0	18,700	
September 25	3:00 p.m.	at Drake	Drake Stadium; Des Moines, IA	L 7–10	12,300	
October 2	8:00 p.m.	Dayton*	Fairgrounds Stadium; Louisville, KY	W 41–13	17,511	
October 9		at Memphis State	Memphis Memorial Stadium; Memphis, TN (rivalry)	W 26–20	20,559	
October 16	8:30 p.m.	at North Texas State	Texas Stadium; Irving, TX	L 17–20	12,000	
October 23	2:01 p.m.	Wichita State	Fairgrounds Stadium; Louisville, KY	W 21–5	14,176	
October 30	7:30 p.m.	No. 10 Tampa*	Fairgrounds Stadium; Louisville, KY	W 21–10	17,341	
November 6	2:30 p.m.	at Tulsa	Skelly Stadium; Tulsa, OK	W 17–0	14,000	
November 13	2:00 p.m.	Southern Illinois*	Fairgrounds Stadium; Louisville, KY	W 24–14	10,100	
November 27	2:00 p.m.	Cincinnati*	Fairgrounds Stadium; Louisville, KY (The Keg of Nails)	L 16–19	10,132	
*Non-conference game; Rankings from AP Poll released prior to the game; All times are in Eastern time
