= Jeff Lyman =

American football player (born 1950)

No. 37, 50, 59
- Position: Linebacker

Personal information
- Born: August 21, 1950 (age 76); Salt Lake City, Utah, U.S.
- Listed height: 6 ft 3 in (1.91 m)
- Listed weight: 235 lb (107 kg)

Career information
- High school: Skyline (UT)
- College: BYU
- NFL draft: 1972: 4th round, 82nd overall pick

Career history
- St. Louis Cardinals (1972); Buffalo Bills (1972); New England Patriots (1973)*; Los Angeles Rams (1973)*
- * Offseason or practice squad member only
- Stats at Pro Football Reference

Jeffery Borden Lyman (born August 21, 1950) is an American former professional football player who was a linebacker for the St. Louis Cardinals and Buffalo Bills of the National Football League (NFL). He played college football for the BYU Cougars. He also was a businessman who owned the factory "Jeff Lyman's Sofa Factory".

== Early life and education ==
Jeff Lyman was born on August 21, 1950, in Salt Lake City, Utah. Lyman went to high school at Skyline (Uth). He went to college at Brigham Young University. Had had an interception return for a touchdown in 1971.

== Professional career ==
=== 1972 season ===
Lyman was selected in the fourth round (82nd overall) of the 1972 NFL draft by the St. Louis Cardinals. He played in 2 games with them before being waived. He was then claimed by the Buffalo Bills and appeared in 1 game.

=== 1973 season ===
In April 1973, Lyman was traded in a multi-player trade to the New England Patriots. He was released in training camp and signed with the Los Angeles Rams but did not make their roster.

== Business career ==
In January 1973, Lyman opened a business called Jeff Lyman's Sofa Factory. He worked with 2 of his brothers (Jack and Steve), who also were players with BYU. The store was located in Provo, Utah.
