= 1971 Texas Longhorns football team =

American college football season

1971 Texas Longhorns football

SWC champion

Cotton Bowl Classic, L 6–30 vs. Penn State
- Conference: Southwest Conference

Ranking
- Coaches: No. 12
- AP: No. 18
- Record: 8–3 (6–1 SWC)
- Head coach: Darrell Royal (15th season)
- Offensive coordinator: Emory Bellard (6th season)
- Offensive scheme: Wishbone
- Defensive coordinator: Mike Campbell
- Base defense: 4–4
- Home stadium: Memorial Stadium

1971 Southwest Conference football standings
	Conf.					Overall
Team	W		L		T	W		L		T
No. 18 Texas $	6	–	1	–	0	8	–	3	–	0
No. 16 Arkansas	5	–	1	–	1	8	–	3	–	1
TCU	5	–	2	–	0	6	–	4	–	1
Texas A&M	4	–	3	–	0	5	–	6	–	0
SMU	3	–	4	–	0	4	–	7	–	0
Rice	2	–	4	–	1	3	–	7	–	1
Texas Tech	2	–	5	–	0	4	–	7	–	0
Baylor	0	–	7	–	0	1	–	9	–	0
$ – Conference champion; Rankings from AP Poll

The 1971 Texas Longhorns football team represented the University of Texas at Austin during the 1971 NCAA University Division football season.

Texas' hopes for a third consecutive national championship were squashed with back-to-back one-sided losses in October to its two biggest rivals, Oklahoma and Arkansas. The Longhorns recovered to win their fourth consecutive Southwest Conference championship and returned to the Cotton Bowl, where they were routed 30-6 by Penn State.

== Schedule ==
Date	Time	Opponent	Rank	Site	TV	Result	Attendance	Source
September 18	3:30 p.m.	at UCLA*	No. 3	Los Angeles Memorial Coliseum; Los Angeles, CA	ABC	W 28–10	36,504	
September 25	4:00 p.m.	Texas Tech	No. 3	Memorial Stadium; Austin, TX (rivalry)		W 28–0	76,639	
October 2	4:00 p.m.	Oregon*	No. 3	Memorial Stadium; Austin, TX		W 35–7	66,500	
October 9	2:00 p.m.	vs. No. 9 Oklahoma*	No. 3	Cotton Bowl; Dallas, TX (Red River Shootout)	CBS	L 27–48	73,580	
October 16	3:00 p.m.	at No. 16 Arkansas	No. 10	War Memorial Stadium; Little Rock, AR (rivalry)	ABC	L 7–31	54,446	
October 23	2:00 p.m.	Rice	No. 16	Memorial Stadium; Austin, TX (rivalry)		W 39–10	61,000	
October 30	2:00 p.m.	at SMU	No. 14	Cotton Bowl; Dallas, TX		W 22–18	40,551	
November 6	2:00 p.m.	Baylor	No. 15	Memorial Stadium; Austin, TX (rivalry)		W 24–0	54,500	
November 13	2:00 p.m.	TCU	No. 13	Memorial Stadium; Austin, TX (rivalry)		W 31–0	63,500	
November 25	1:30 p.m.	at Texas A&M	No. 12	Kyle Field; College Station, TX (rivalry)		W 34–14	52,090	
January 1, 1972	1:00 p.m.	vs. No. 10 Penn State*	No. 12	Cotton Bowl; Dallas, TX (Cotton Bowl Classic)	CBS	L 6–30	72,000	
*Non-conference game; Rankings from AP Poll released prior to the game

== Game summaries ==
=== Oregon ===
Team	1	2	3	4	Total
Oregon	0	0	0	7	7
• Texas	7	7	7	14	35

- Date: October 2
- Location: Memorial Stadium, Austin, TX
- Game attendance: 66,500

Scoring summary
1	11:04	TEX	Callison 1-yard run (Valek kick)	TEX 7-0
2	2:17	TEX	Wigginton 3-yard run (Valek kick)	TEX 14-0
3	6:59	TEX	Wigginton 5-yard run (Valek kick)	TEX 21-0
4	12:45	TEX	Ladd 1-yard run (Valek kick)	TEX 28-0
4	6:32	TEX	Ladd 2-yard run (Valek kick)	TEX 35-0
4	5:30	ORE	Glass 45-yard pass from Winn (Battle kick)	TEX 35-7

=== TCU ===
TCU Horned Frogs (4–3) at #13 Texas Longhorns (6–2)

Quarter	1	2	3	4	Total
TCU	0	0	0	0	0
Texas	0	7	7	17	31

at Memorial Stadium, Austin, Texas

- Date: November 13
- Game time: 2:00 p.m. CST
- Game weather: 81 °F (27 °C)
- Game attendance: 63,500
- Box Score

Game information

First quarter

- No scoring

Second quarter

- TEX – Dennis Ladd 3-yard run (Glen Gaspard kick), 5:55. Texas 7–0. Drive: 17 plays, 80 yards, 7:48.

Third quarter

- TEX – Donnie Wigginton 5-yard run (Glen Gaspard kick), 11:52. Texas 14–0. Drive: 9 plays, 62 yards, 3:08.

Fourth quarter

- TEX – Dennis Ladd 1-yard run (Glen Gaspard kick), 11:20. Texas 21–0. Drive: 13 plays, 87 yards, 5:02.
- TEX – Steve Valek 47-yard field goal, 8:12. Texas 24–0. Drive: 4 plays, 36 yards, 1:36.
- TEX – Donnie Wigginton 1-yard run (Glen Gaspard kick), 5:42. Texas 31–0. Drive: 4 plays, 9 yards, 1:45.

Top passers

- TCU
- TEX – Donnie Wigginton – 1/2, 21 yards

Top rushers

- TCU
- TEX – Jim Bertelsen – 25 rushes, 94 yards

Top receivers

- TCU
- TEX – Rick Davis – 1 reception, 21 yards

== Roster ==
1971 Texas Longhorns football team roster
Players
Coaches
Offense

Pos.	#	Name	Class
RB	35	Jim Bertelsen	Sr
RB	26	Dennis Ladd	So
QB	14	Eddie Phillips	Sr
OT	76	Jerry Sisemore	Jr
QB	18	Donnie Wigginton	Sr

Defense

Pos.	#	Name	Class
LB, K	38	Glenn Gaspard	So
DT	31	Greg Ploetz	Sr

Special teams

Pos.	#	Name	Class
K	7	Steve Valek	So

Head coach

- Darrell Royal

Coordinators/assistant coaches

- Emory Bellard (OC)
- Mike Campbell (DC)
- Willie Zapalac

Legend

- (C) Team captain
- (S) Suspended
- (I) Ineligible
- Injured
- Redshirt

Roster

== NFL draft ==
Two seniors from the 1971 Longhorns were selected in the 1972 NFL draft:

Player	Position	Round	Pick	Franchise
Jim Bertelsen	RB	2	30	Los Angeles Rams
Eddie Phillips	QB	4	95	Los Angeles Rams
