= 1971 UTEP Miners football team =

American college football season

1971 UTEP Miners football
- Conference: Western Athletic Conference
- Record: 5–6 (1–6 WAC)
- Head coach: Bobby Dobbs (7th season)
- Home stadium: Sun Bowl

1971 Western Athletic Conference football standings
| | Conf. | | | | | Overall |
| Team | W | | L | | T | W | | L | | T |
|---|---|---|---|---|---|---|---|---|---|---|
| No. 8 Arizona State $ | 7 | – | 0 | – | 0 | 11 | – | 1 | – | 0 |
| New Mexico | 5 | – | 1 | – | 0 | 6 | – | 3 | – | 2 |
| Arizona | 3 | – | 3 | – | 0 | 5 | – | 6 | – | 0 |
| BYU | 3 | – | 4 | – | 0 | 5 | – | 6 | – | 0 |
| Wyoming | 3 | – | 4 | – | 0 | 5 | – | 6 | – | 0 |
| Utah | 3 | – | 4 | – | 0 | 3 | – | 8 | – | 0 |
| Colorado State | 1 | – | 4 | – | 0 | 3 | – | 8 | – | 0 |
| UTEP | 1 | – | 6 | – | 0 | 5 | – | 6 | – | 0 |
$ – Conference champion; Rankings from AP Poll

The 1971 UTEP Miners football team was an American football team that represented the University of Texas at El Paso in the Western Athletic Conference during the 1971 NCAA University Division football season. In their seventh year under head coach Bobby Dobbs, the team compiled a 5–6 record.

== Schedule ==
| Date | Time | Opponent | Site | Result | Attendance | Source |
|---|---|---|---|---|---|---|
| September 11 | 7:30 p.m. | UT Arlington* | Sun Bowl; El Paso, TX | W 38–9 | 17,212 | |
| September 18 | 7:30 p.m. | Pacific (CA)* | Sun Bowl; El Paso, TX | W 21–3 | 15,353 | |
| September 25 | | Arizona | Sun Bowl; El Paso, TX | L 6–14 | 20,520 | |
| October 2 | | at No. 13 Arizona State | Sun Devil Stadium; Tempe, AZ | L 7–24 | 50,530 | |
| October 9 | | Utah^{†} | Sun Bowl; El Paso, TX | L 10–32 | 14,803 | |
| October 16 | | at New Mexico State* | Memorial Stadium; Las Cruces, NM (rivalry) | W 14–7 | 14,682 | |
| October 23 | | at Wyoming | War Memorial Stadium; Laramie, WY | W 12–7 | 19,510 | |
| October 30 | | BYU | Sun Bowl; El Paso, TX | L 0–16 | 12,235 | |
| November 13 | | at New Mexico | University Stadium; Albuquerque, NM | L 13–49 | 15,650 | |
| November 20 | | Colorado State | Sun Bowl; El Paso, TX | L 7–24 | 7,861 | |
| November 27 | | Long Beach State* | Sun Bowl; El Paso, TX | W 38–32 | 6,530 | |
*Non-conference game; ^{†}Homecoming; Rankings from AP Poll released prior to the game; All times are in Mountain time
