= 1971 Texas Tech Red Raiders football team =

American college football season

1971 Texas Tech Red Raiders football
- Conference: Southwest Conference
- Record: 4–7 (2–5 SWC)
- Head coach: Jim Carlen (2nd season)
- Offensive scheme: No-huddle option
- Defensive coordinator: Richard Bell (2nd season)
- Base defense: 4–3
- Home stadium: Jones Stadium

1971 Southwest Conference football standings
	Conf.					Overall
Team	W		L		T	W		L		T
No. 18 Texas $	6	–	1	–	0	8	–	3	–	0
No. 16 Arkansas	5	–	1	–	1	8	–	3	–	1
TCU	5	–	2	–	0	6	–	4	–	1
Texas A&M	4	–	3	–	0	5	–	6	–	0
SMU	3	–	4	–	0	4	–	7	–	0
Rice	2	–	4	–	1	3	–	7	–	1
Texas Tech	2	–	5	–	0	4	–	7	–	0
Baylor	0	–	7	–	0	1	–	9	–	0
$ – Conference champion; Rankings from AP Poll

The 1971 Texas Tech Red Raiders football team represented Texas Tech University in the Southwest Conference (SWC) during the 1971 NCAA University Division football season. In their second season under head coach Jim Carlen, the Red Raiders compiled a 4–7 record (2–5 against conference opponents), finished in seventh place in the SWC, and were outscored by opponents by a combined total of 138 to 131. The team's statistical leaders included Jimmy Carmichael with 423 passing yards, Doug McCutchen with 548 rushing yards, and Johnny Odom with 242 receiving yards. The team played its home games at Clifford B. & Audrey Jones Stadium.

== Schedule ==
Date	Opponent	Site	Result	Attendance	Source
September 11	at Tulane*	Tulane Stadium; [New Orleans, LA	L 9–15	21,738	
September 18	New Mexico*	Jones Stadium; Lubbock, TX	L 10–13	37,200	
September 25	at No. 3 Texas	Memorial Stadium; Austin, TX (rivalry)	L 0–28	76,639	
October 2	at Arizona*	Arizona Stadium; Tucson, AZ	W 13–6	31,000	
October 9	Texas A&M	Jones Stadium; Lubbock, TX (rivalry)	W 28–7	44,380	
October 16	Boston College*	Jones Stadium; Lubbock, TX	W 14–6	32,480	
October 23	at SMU	Cotton Bowl; Dallas, TX	L 17–18	26,681	
October 30	Rice^{†}	Jones Stadium; Lubbock, TX	L 7–9	38,340	
November 6	at TCU	Amon G. Carter Stadium; Fort Worth, TX (rivalry)	L 6–17	22,138	
November 13	Baylor	Jones Stadium; Lubbock, TX (rivalry)	W 27–0	32,169	
November 20	at No. 17 Arkansas	Razorback Stadium; Fayetteville, AR (rivalry)	L 0–15	43,000	
*Non-conference game; ^{†}Homecoming; Rankings from AP Poll released prior to the game
