= 1971 Texas A&M Aggies football team =

American college football season

1971 Texas A&M Aggies football
- Conference: Southwest Conference
- Record: 5–6 (4–3 SWC)
- Head coach: Gene Stallings (7th season)
- Home stadium: Kyle Field

1971 Southwest Conference football standings
| | Conf. | | | | | Overall |
| Team | W | | L | | T | W | | L | | T |
|---|---|---|---|---|---|---|---|---|---|---|
| No. 18 Texas $ | 6 | – | 1 | – | 0 | 8 | – | 3 | – | 0 |
| No. 16 Arkansas | 5 | – | 1 | – | 1 | 8 | – | 3 | – | 1 |
| TCU | 5 | – | 2 | – | 0 | 6 | – | 4 | – | 1 |
| Texas A&M | 4 | – | 3 | – | 0 | 5 | – | 6 | – | 0 |
| SMU | 3 | – | 4 | – | 0 | 4 | – | 7 | – | 0 |
| Rice | 2 | – | 4 | – | 1 | 3 | – | 7 | – | 1 |
| Texas Tech | 2 | – | 5 | – | 0 | 4 | – | 7 | – | 0 |
| Baylor | 0 | – | 7 | – | 0 | 1 | – | 9 | – | 0 |
$ – Conference champion; Rankings from AP Poll

The 1971 Texas A&M Aggies football team represented Texas A&M University in the 1971 NCAA University Division football season as a member of the Southwest Conference (SWC). The Aggies were led by head coach Gene Stallings in his seventh season and finished with a record of five wins and six losses (5–6 overall, 4–3 in the SWC).

Stallings was fired as head coach and athletic director at the conclusion of the season and replaced by Emory Bellard, offensive coordinator of archrival Texas and the architect of the Wishbone formation. Bellard was hired after LSU coach Charles McClendon rejected a lucrative offer to become the Aggies' coach and AD (McClendon was not AD at LSU, unusual for the time in the Southeastern Conference).

Stallings was hired by Tom Landry to be an assistant coach with the National Football League's Dallas Cowboys, a position he held until he was named head coach of the St. Louis Cardinals in 1986. Stallings returned to college coaching in 1990 as head coach at Alabama.

== Schedule ==
| Date | Opponent | Site | Result | Attendance | Source |
|---|---|---|---|---|---|
| September 11 | Wichita State* | Kyle Field; College Station, TX | W 41–7 | 29,580 | |
| September 18 | at LSU* | Tiger Stadium; Baton Rouge, LA (rivalry) | L 0–37 | 68,576 | |
| September 25 | at No. 1 Nebraska* | Memorial Stadium; Lincoln, NE | L 7–34 | 67,993 | |
| October 2 | Cincinnati* | Kyle Field; College Station, TX | L 0–17 | 26,267 | |
| October 9 | at Texas Tech | Jones Stadium; Lubbock, TX (rivalry) | L 7–28 | 44,380 | |
| October 16 | at TCU | Amon G. Carter Stadium; Fort Worth, TX | L 3–14 | 31,910 | |
| October 23 | Baylor | Kyle Field; College Station, TX (rivalry) | W 10–9 | 28,662 | |
| October 30 | at No. 8 Arkansas | War Memorial Stadium; Little Rock, AR (rivalry) | W 17–9 | 54,446 | |
| November 6 | SMU | Kyle Field; College Station, TX | W 27–10 | 27,358–28,570 | |
| November 13 | at Rice | Rice Stadium; Houston, TX | W 18–13 | 47,000 | |
| November 25 | No. 12 Texas | Kyle Field; College Station, TX (rivalry) | L 14–34 | 52,090 | |
*Non-conference game; Rankings from AP Poll released prior to the game
