= 1971 Wyoming Cowboys football team =

American college football season

1971 Wyoming Cowboys football
- Conference: Western Athletic Conference
- Record: 5–6 (3–4 WAC)
- Head coach: Fritz Shurmur (1st season)
- Captains: Mick Carter; Gary Fox
- Home stadium: War Memorial Stadium

1971 Western Athletic Conference football standings
	Conf.					Overall
Team	W		L		T	W		L		T
No. 8 Arizona State $	7	–	0	–	0	11	–	1	–	0
New Mexico	5	–	1	–	0	6	–	3	–	2
Arizona	3	–	3	–	0	5	–	6	–	0
BYU	3	–	4	–	0	5	–	6	–	0
Wyoming	3	–	4	–	0	5	–	6	–	0
Utah	3	–	4	–	0	3	–	8	–	0
Colorado State	1	–	4	–	0	3	–	8	–	0
UTEP	1	–	6	–	0	5	–	6	–	0
$ – Conference champion; Rankings from AP Poll

The 1971 Wyoming Cowboys football team represented the University of Wyoming as a member of the Western Athletic Conference (WAC) during the 1971 NCAA University Division football season. Led by first-year head coach Fritz Shurmur, the Cowboys compiled a record of 5–6 (3-4 against conference opponents), placing in a three-way tie for third in the WAC. The team played home games on campus at War Memorial Stadium in Laramie, Wyoming.

Shurmur had been the defensive line coach at Wyoming for nine years under head coach Lloyd Eaton, who resigned in December 1970. Shurmur was reassigned to assistant athletic director, and Shurmur was promoted to head coach.

== Schedule ==
Date	Time	Opponent	Site	Result	Attendance	Source
September 11		South Dakota*	War Memorial Stadium; Laramie, WY	W 42–28	20,899	
September 18		at No. 12 Colorado*	Folsom Field; Boulder, CO	L 13–56	40,729	
September 25	1:32 p.m.	at Air Force*	Falcon Stadium; Colorado Springs, CO	L 19–23	36,719–37,917	
October 2		Colorado State	War Memorial Stadium; Laramie, WY (rivalry)	W 17–6	17,849	
October 9		Arizona	War Memorial Stadium; Laramie, WY	W 14–3	19,100	
October 16		BYU	War Memorial Stadium; Laramie, WY	L 17–35	15,538	
October 23		UTEP	War Memorial Stadium; Laramie, WY	L 7–12	19,510	
October 30		at Utah	Rice Stadium; Salt Lake City, UT	W 29–16	11,807	
November 6		at Utah State*	Romney Stadium; Logan, UT (rivalry)	W 31–29	9,130	
November 13		at No. 9 Arizona State	Sun Devil Stadium; Tempe, AZ	L 19–52	50,347	
November 20		at New Mexico	University Stadium; Albuquerque, NM	L 14–49	13,671	
*Non-conference game; Rankings from AP Poll released prior to the game

== NFL draft ==
One Cowboy was selected in the 1972 NFL draft, which lasted seventeen rounds (442 selections).

Player	Position	Round	Overall	NFL team
Conrad Dobler	Guard	5	110	St. Louis Cardinals

- List of Wyoming Cowboys in the NFL draft
