= 1971 Colorado State Rams football team =

American college football season

1971 Colorado State Rams football
- Conference: Western Athletic Conference
- Record: 3–8 (1–4 WAC)
- Head coach: Jerry Wampfler (2nd season)
- Offensive coordinator: Andy MacDonald (2nd season)
- Defensive coordinator: Fred Conti (1st season)
- Home stadium: Hughes Stadium

1971 Western Athletic Conference football standings
	Conf.					Overall
Team	W		L		T	W		L		T
No. 8 Arizona State $	7	–	0	–	0	11	–	1	–	0
New Mexico	5	–	1	–	0	6	–	3	–	2
Arizona	3	–	3	–	0	5	–	6	–	0
BYU	3	–	4	–	0	5	–	6	–	0
Wyoming	3	–	4	–	0	5	–	6	–	0
Utah	3	–	4	–	0	3	–	8	–	0
Colorado State	1	–	4	–	0	3	–	8	–	0
UTEP	1	–	6	–	0	5	–	6	–	0
$ – Conference champion; Rankings from AP Poll

The 1971 Colorado State Rams football team was an American football squad that represented Colorado State University in the Western Athletic Conference (WAC) during the 1971 NCAA University Division football season. In its second season under head coach Jerry Wampfler, the team compiled a 3–8 record (1–4 against WAC opponents).

Colorado State's senior running back, Lawrence McCutcheon, rushed for 1,112 yards and caught 19 passes for 197 yards. McCutcheon later played ten seasons in the National Football League and appeared in five Pro Bowls.

== Schedule ==
Date	Time	Opponent	Site	Result	Attendance	Source
September 18		at BYU	Cougar Stadium; Provo, UT	L 14–54	31,087	
September 25		at Idaho*	Joe Albi Stadium; Spokane, WA	L 0–10	12,600	
October 2		at Wyoming	War Memorial Stadium; Laramie, Wyoming, WY (rivalry)	L 6–17	17,849	
October 9		No. 12 Arizona State	Hughes Stadium; Fort Collins, CO	L 0–42	25,101	
October 16		at Utah	Ute Stadium; Salt Lake City, UT	L 16–42	10,148	
October 23	1:30 p.m.	No. 20 Air Force*	Hughes Stadium; Fort Collins, CO (rivalry)	L 12–17	23,194	
October 30		Utah State*^{†}	Hughes Stadium; Fort Collins, CO	L 17–18	14,294	
November 6	1:02 p.m.	at Wichita State*	Cessna Stadium; Wichita, KS	L 14–34	11,214	
November 13	1:00 p.m.	West Texas State*	Hughes Stadium; Fort Collins, CO	W 36–14	13,348	
November 20		at UTEP	Sun Bowl; El Paso, TX	W 24–7	7,861	
November 27		New Mexico State*	Hughes Stadium; Fort Collins, CO	W 38–21	9,475	
*Non-conference game; ^{†}Homecoming; Rankings from AP Poll released prior to the game; All times are in Mountain time
