= 1971 Rice Owls football team =

American college football season

1971 Rice Owls football
- Conference: Southwest Conference
- Record: 3–7–1 (2–4–1 SWC)
- Head coach: Bill Peterson (1st season)
- Home stadium: Rice Stadium

1971 Southwest Conference football standings
	Conf.					Overall
Team	W		L		T	W		L		T
No. 18 Texas $	6	–	1	–	0	8	–	3	–	0
No. 16 Arkansas	5	–	1	–	1	8	–	3	–	1
TCU	5	–	2	–	0	6	–	4	–	1
Texas A&M	4	–	3	–	0	5	–	6	–	0
SMU	3	–	4	–	0	4	–	7	–	0
Rice	2	–	4	–	1	3	–	7	–	1
Texas Tech	2	–	5	–	0	4	–	7	–	0
Baylor	0	–	7	–	0	1	–	9	–	0
$ – Conference champion; Rankings from AP Poll

The 1971 Rice Owls football team was an American football team that represented Rice University in the Southwest Conference (SWC) during the 1971 NCAA University Division football season. In its first and only season under head coach Bill Peterson, the team compiled a 3–7–1 record (2–4–1 against SWC opponents), finished sixth in the conference, and was outscored by a total of 220 to 146. The team played its home games at Rice Stadium in Houston.

The team's statistical leaders included Bruce Gadd with 1,061 passing yards, Stahle Vincent with 945 rushing yards, Gary Butler with 397 receiving yards, and Bubba Berg and Stahle Vincent with 18 points each. Stahle Vincent was selected by the Associated Press as a first-team running back on the 1971 All-Southwest Conference football team.

== Schedule ==
Date	Opponent	Site	Result	Attendance	Source
September 11	Houston*	Rice Stadium; Houston, TX (rivalry)	L 21–23	62,000	
September 18	No. 17 USC*	Rice Stadium; Houston, TX	L 0–24	22,000	
September 25	Tulane*	Rice Stadium; Houston, TX	W 14–11	25,000	
October 2	at No. 16 LSU*	Tiger Stadium; Baton Rouge, LA	L 3–38	65,976	
October 16	SMU	Rice Stadium; Houston, TX (rivalry)	L 10–16	25,000	
October 23	at No. 16 Texas	Memorial Stadium; Austin, TX (rivalry)	L 10–39	61,000	
October 30	at Texas Tech	Jones Stadium; Lubbock, TX	W 9–7	38,340	
November 6	No. 16 Arkansas	Rice Stadium; Houston, TX	T 24–24	32,000	
November 13	Texas A&M	Rice Stadium; Houston, TX	L 13–18	47,000	
November 20	at TCU	Amon G. Carter Stadium; Fort Worth, TX	L 19–20	19,412	
November 27	Baylor	Rice Stadium; Houston, TX	W 23–0	15,000	
*Non-conference game; Rankings from AP Poll released prior to the game
