= 1971 North Texas State Mean Green football team =

American college football season

1971 North Texas State Mean Green football
- Conference: Missouri Valley Conference
- Record: 3–8 (3–2 MVC)
- Head coach: Rod Rust (5th season)
- Home stadium: Fouts Field; Cotton Bowl; Texas Stadium

1971 Missouri Valley Conference football standings
	Conf.					Overall
Team	W		L		T	W		L		T
Memphis State $	4	–	1	–	0	5	–	6	–	0
Louisville	3	–	2	–	0	6	–	3	–	1
Tulsa	3	–	2	–	0	4	–	7	–	0
North Texas State	3	–	2	–	0	3	–	8	–	0
Drake	2	–	3	–	0	7	–	4	–	0
West Texas State	1	–	4	–	0	2	–	9	–	0
Wichita State	0	–	5	–	0	3	–	8	–	0
New Mexico State *	0	–	0	–	0	5	–	5	–	1
$ – Conference champion; * – New Mexico State was ineligible for conference play, but its games against Drake, North Texas State, West Texas State, and Wichita State counted in the conference standings for its opponents. Drake's game against Tampa, Memphis State's games against Cincinnati and Southern Miss, and Tulsa's games against BYU and Virginia Tech were also designated as conference games.

The 1971 North Texas State Mean Green football team was an American football team that represented North Texas State University (now known as the University of North Texas) as a member of the Missouri Valley Conference (MVC) during the 1971 NCAA University Division football season . In their fifth year under head coach Rod Rust, the Mean Green compiled an overall record of 3–8 with a mark of 3–2 in conference play, placing in a three-way tie for second in the MVC.

== Schedule ==
Date	Time	Opponent	Site	Result	Attendance	Source
September 10	8:30 p.m.	BYU*	Cotton Bowl; Dallas, TX	L 13–41	13,000	
September 18	8:30 p.m.	at Weber State*	Wildcat Stadium; Ogden, UT	L 0–20	13,071	
September 25		at New Mexico State (Note: Designated conference game)	Memorial Stadium; Las Cruces, NM	L 0–10	10,160	
October 9	7:30 p.m.	No. 9 (small) Akron*	Fouts Field; Denton, TX	L 6–20	5,000	
October 16	7:30 p.m.	Louisville	Texas Stadium; Irving, TX	W 20–17	12,000	
October 23	2:00 p.m.	at No. 9 Arkansas*	Razorback Stadium; Fayetteville, AR	L 21–60	38,135	
October 30	2:00 p.m.	Drake^{†}	Fouts Field; Denton, TX	W 21–12	12,350	
November 6	12:30 p.m.	at Cincinnati*	Nippert Stadium; Cincinnati, OH	L 7–40	2,500	
November 13		at Memphis State	Memphis Memorial Stadium; Memphis, TN	L 8–47	13,788	
November 20	1:30 p.m.	Wichita State	Texas Stadium; Irving, TX	W 31–10	10,000	
December 4	9:30 p.m.	at San Diego State*	San Diego Stadium; San Diego, CA	L 44–28	16,278	
*Non-conference game; ^{†}Homecoming; Rankings from AP Poll released prior to the game; All times are in Central time
