= 1971 Arizona Wildcats football team =

American college football season

1971 Arizona Wildcats football
- Conference: Western Athletic Conference
- Record: 5–6 (3–3 WAC)
- Head coach: Bob Weber (3rd season)
- Home stadium: Arizona Stadium

1971 Western Athletic Conference football standings
	Conf.					Overall
Team	W		L		T	W		L		T
No. 8 Arizona State $	7	–	0	–	0	11	–	1	–	0
New Mexico	5	–	1	–	0	6	–	3	–	2
Arizona	3	–	3	–	0	5	–	6	–	0
BYU	3	–	4	–	0	5	–	6	–	0
Wyoming	3	–	4	–	0	5	–	6	–	0
Utah	3	–	4	–	0	3	–	8	–	0
Colorado State	1	–	4	–	0	3	–	8	–	0
UTEP	1	–	6	–	0	5	–	6	–	0
$ – Conference champion; Rankings from AP Poll

The 1971 Arizona Wildcats football team represented the University of Arizona in the Western Athletic Conference (WAC) during the 1971 NCAA University Division football season. In their third season under head coach Bob Weber, the Wildcats compiled a 5–6 record (3–3 against WAC opponents), finished in third place in the WAC, and were outscored by their opponents, 232 to 191. The team played its home games in Arizona Stadium in Tucson, Arizona.

The team's statistical leaders included Bill Demory with 1,384 passing yards, Bob McCall with 525 rushing yards, and Charlie McKee with 854 receiving yards.

This was the first season in which Arizona played eleven regular season games, as the NCAA announced plans to expand the regular season.

== Schedule ==
Date	Opponent	Site	Result	Attendance	Source
September 18	at Washington State*	Joe Albi Stadium; Spokane, WA	W 39–28	13,500	
September 25	at UTEP	Sun Bowl; El Paso, TX	W 14–6	20,520	
October 2	Texas Tech*	Arizona Stadium; Tucson, AZ	L 10–13	31,000	
October 9	at Wyoming	War Memorial Stadium; Laramie, WY	L 3–14	19,100	
October 16	UCLA*	Arizona Stadium; Tucson, AZ	L 12–28	37,500	
October 23	Utah	Arizona Stadium; Tucson, AZ	W 14–3	31,000	
October 30	New Mexico	Arizona Stadium; Tucson, AZ (rivalry)	L 28–34	30,000	
November 6	Oregon State*	Arizona Stadium; Tucson, AZ	W 34–22	31,000	
November 13	at BYU	Cougar Stadium; Provo, UT	W 27–14	27,109	
November 20	at San Diego State*	San Diego Stadium; San Diego, CA	L 10–39	21,681	
November 27	at No. 9 Arizona State	Sun Devil Stadium; Tempe, AZ (rivalry)	L 0–31	50,370	
*Non-conference game; Rankings from AP Poll released prior to the game

== Game summaries ==
=== at Washington State ===
Arizona started the season strong with a win over Washington State, their first road win since 1968 when they defeated Utah, and broke a nine-game road losing streak dating back to that season.

=== at Arizona State ===
Arizona Wildcats (5–5) at #9 Arizona State Sun Devils (9–1)

Quarter	1	2	3	4	Total
Arizona	0	0	0	0	0
Arizona St	10	21	0	0	31

at Sun Devil Stadium, Tempe, Arizona

- Date: November 27
- Game attendance: 50,370

In the season finale at Arizona State, the Wildcats never stood a chance against the Sun Devils, and were shut out. As of 2021, this remains Arizona State's most recent shutout victory over the Wildcats in Tempe.

== Personnel ==
1971 Arizona Wildcats football team roster
Players			Coaches
Offense: Pos. / # / Name / Class; QB / / Bill Demory	Defense: Pos. / # / Name / Class	Special teams: Pos. / # / Name / Class	Head coach: Bob Weber; Coordinators/assistant coaches Legend: (C) Team captain; (S) Suspended; (I) Ineligible; Injured; Redshirt
