= 1971 SMU Mustangs football team =

American college football season

1971 SMU Mustangs football
- Conference: Southwest Conference
- Record: 4–7 (3–4 SWC)
- Head coach: Hayden Fry (10th season)
- Home stadium: Cotton Bowl

1971 Southwest Conference football standings
	Conf.					Overall
Team	W		L		T	W		L		T
No. 18 Texas $	6	–	1	–	0	8	–	3	–	0
No. 16 Arkansas	5	–	1	–	1	8	–	3	–	1
TCU	5	–	2	–	0	6	–	4	–	1
Texas A&M	4	–	3	–	0	5	–	6	–	0
SMU	3	–	4	–	0	4	–	7	–	0
Rice	2	–	4	–	1	3	–	7	–	1
Texas Tech	2	–	5	–	0	4	–	7	–	0
Baylor	0	–	7	–	0	1	–	9	–	0
$ – Conference champion; Rankings from AP Poll

The 1971 SMU Mustangs football team represented Southern Methodist University (SMU) as a member of the Southwest Conference (SWC) during the 1971 NCAA University Division football season. Led by tenth-year head coach Hayden Fry, the Mustangs compiled an overall record of 4–7 with a conference mark of 3–4, placing fifth in the SWC.

== Schedule ==
Date	Opponent	Site	Result	Attendance	Source
September 18	at No. 10 Oklahoma*	Oklahoma Memorial Stadium; Norman, OK	L 0–30	48,500	
September 25	at Missouri*	Memorial Stadium; Columbia, MO	L 12–24	49,200	
October 2	New Mexico State*	Cotton Bowl; Dallas, TX	W 28–25	31,120	
October 9	at Air Force*	Falcon Stadium; Colorado Springs, CO	L 0–30	45,050	
October 16	at Rice	Rice Stadium; Houston, TX (rivalry)	W 16–10	25,000	
October 23	Texas Tech	Cotton Bowl; Dallas, TX	W 18–17	25,681	
October 30	No. 14 Texas	Cotton Bowl; Dallas, TX	L 18–22	40,551	
November 6	at Texas A&M	Kyle Field; College Station, TX	L 10–27	27,358–28,570	
November 13	No. 17 Arkansas	Cotton Bowl; Dallas, TX	L 13–18	30,773	
November 20	at Baylor	Baylor Stadium; Waco, TX	W 20–6	25,000	
November 27	TCU	Cotton Bowl; Dallas, TX (rivalry)	L 16–18	18,128	
*Non-conference game; Rankings from AP Poll released prior to the game

== Roster ==
1971 SMU Mustangs football team roster
Players
Coaches
Offense

Pos.	#	Name	Class
QB	17	Gary Hammond	Sr
RB	28	Alvin Maxson	So
OT	73	John Meyer	Jr

Defense

Pos.	#	Name	Class
DB	24	Pat Curry	Jr
DB	43	Robert Popelka	Jr
DE	46	Jim Ryan

Special teams

Pos.	#	Name	Class

Head coach

- Hayden Fry

Coordinators/assistant coaches

Legend

- (C) Team captain
- (S) Suspended
- (I) Ineligible
- Injured
- Redshirt
