= 1971 Utah Utes football team =

American college football season

1971 Utah Utes football
- Conference: Western Athletic Conference
- Record: 3–8 (3–4 WAC)
- Head coach: Bill Meek (4th season)
- Defensive coordinator: Jim LaRue (4th season)
- Home stadium: Ute Stadium

1971 Western Athletic Conference football standings
	Conf.					Overall
Team	W		L		T	W		L		T
No. 8 Arizona State $	7	–	0	–	0	11	–	1	–	0
New Mexico	5	–	1	–	0	6	–	3	–	2
Arizona	3	–	3	–	0	5	–	6	–	0
BYU	3	–	4	–	0	5	–	6	–	0
Wyoming	3	–	4	–	0	5	–	6	–	0
Utah	3	–	4	–	0	3	–	8	–	0
Colorado State	1	–	4	–	0	3	–	8	–	0
UTEP	1	–	6	–	0	5	–	6	–	0
$ – Conference champion; Rankings from AP Poll

The 1971 Utah Utes football team, or also commonly known as the Utah Redskins, was an American football team that represented the University of Utah as a member of the Western Athletic Conference (WAC) during the 1971 NCAA University Division football season. In their fourth season under head coach Bill Meek, the Utes compiled an overall record of 3–8 with a mark of 3–4 against conference opponents, placing in a three-way tie for fourth in the WAC. Home games were played on campus at Ute Stadium in Salt Lake City.

== Schedule ==
Date	Opponent	Site	Result	Attendance	Source
September 18	at Oregon*	Autzen Stadium; Eugene, OR	L 29–36	27,000	
September 25	No. 15 Arizona State	Ute Stadium; Salt Lake City, UT	L 21–41	24,068	
October 2	Washington State*	Ute Stadium; Salt Lake City, UT	L 12–34	15,008	
October 9	at UTEP	Sun Bowl; El Paso, TX	W 32–10	14,803	
October 16	Colorado State	Ute Stadium; Salt Lake City, UT	W 42–16	10,148	
October 23	at Arizona	Arizona Stadium; Tucson, AZ	L 3–14	31,000	
October 30	Wyoming^{†}	Ute Stadium; Salt Lake City, UT	L 16–29	11,807	
November 6	at New Mexico	University Stadium; Albuquerque, NM	L 39–57	15,758	
November 13	Utah State*	Ute Stadium; Salt Lake City, UT (rivalry)	L 17–21	16,292	
November 20	BYU	Cougar Stadium; Provo, UT (rivalry)	W 17–15	23,877	
November 27	at No. 15 Houston*	Astrodome; Houston, TX	L 16–42	26,618	
*Non-conference game; ^{†}Homecoming; Rankings from AP Poll released prior to the game

== Roster ==
1971 Utah Utes football team roster
Players			Coaches
Offense: Pos. / # / Name / Class; QB / / Don Van Galder / So	Defense: Pos. / # / Name / Class	Special teams: Pos. / # / Name / Class	Head coach: Bill Meek; Coordinators/assistant coaches Legend: (C) Team captain; (S) Suspended; (I) Ineligible; Injured; Redshirt

== NFL draft ==
One Utah player was selected in the 1972 NFL draft.

Player	Position	Round	Pick	NFL team
Marv Bateman	Punter	3	78	Dallas Cowboys
