= 1971 New Mexico Lobos football team =

American college football season

1971 New Mexico Lobos football
- Conference: Western Athletic Conference
- Record: 6–3–2 (5–1 WAC)
- Head coach: Rudy Feldman (4th season)
- Captains: Rocky Long; Herman Fredenberg; Bob Gaines
- Home stadium: University Stadium

1971 Western Athletic Conference football standings
	Conf.					Overall
Team	W		L		T	W		L		T
No. 8 Arizona State $	7	–	0	–	0	11	–	1	–	0
New Mexico	5	–	1	–	0	6	–	3	–	2
Arizona	3	–	3	–	0	5	–	6	–	0
BYU	3	–	4	–	0	5	–	6	–	0
Wyoming	3	–	4	–	0	5	–	6	–	0
Utah	3	–	4	–	0	3	–	8	–	0
Colorado State	1	–	4	–	0	3	–	8	–	0
UTEP	1	–	6	–	0	5	–	6	–	0
$ – Conference champion; Rankings from AP Poll

The 1971 New Mexico Lobos football team was an American football team that represented the University of New Mexico in the Western Athletic Conference (WAC) during the 1971 NCAA University Division football season. In their fourth season under head coach Rudy Feldman, the Lobos compiled a 6–3–2 record (5–1 against WAC opponents) and outscored opponents by a total of 341 to 292.

Rocky Long, Herman Fredenberg, and Bob Gaines were the team captains. The team's statistical leaders included Rocky Long with 876 passing yards and 78 points scored, Fred Henry with 1,129 rushing yards, and Ken Smith with 281 receiving yards.

== Schedule ==
Date	Time	Opponent	Site	Result	Attendance	Source
September 18		at Texas Tech*	Jones Stadium; Lubbock, TX	W 13–10	37,200	
September 25		Iowa State*	University Stadium; Albuquerque, NM	L 20–44	27,231	
October 1		at BYU	Cougar Stadium; Provo, UT	W 14–0	25,299	
October 9		New Mexico State*	University Stadium; Albuquerque, NM	T 35–35	26,882	
October 16	8:30 p.m.	at San Jose State*	Spartan Stadium; San Jose, CA	T 21–21	15,374	
October 23		No. 14 Arizona State	University Stadium; Albuquerque, NM	L 28–60	26,020	
October 30		at Arizona	Arizona Stadium; Tucson, AZ	W 34–28	30,000	
November 6		Utah^{†}	University Stadium; Albuquerque, NM	W 57–39	15,758	
November 13		UTEP	University Stadium; Albuquerque, NM	W 49–13	15,650	
November 20		Wyoming	University Stadium; Albuquerque, NM	W 49–14	13,671	
November 27		at Hawaii*	Honolulu Stadium; Honolulu, HI	L 21–28	14,792	
*Non-conference game; ^{†}Homecoming; Rankings from AP Poll released prior to the game; All times are in Mountain time
