= Billy Tohill =

American football player and coach (1939–2000)

Biographical details
- Born: April 5, 1939; Batesville, Mississippi, U.S.
- Died: April 11, 2000 (aged 61); Hoover, Alabama, U.S.

Playing career
- 1958–1960: Mississippi State

Coaching career (HC unless noted)
- 1961–1965: Mississippi State (assistant)
- 1966–1970: Tulane (assistant)
- 1971: TCU (assistant)
- 1971–1973: TCU
- 1974: Birmingham Americans (DB)
- 1975: Birmingham Vulcans (DB)
- 1980–1981: Hueytown HS (AL) (assistant)
- 1982–1990: Pelham HS (AL)
- 1991: UAB (assistant)

Head coaching record
- Overall: 11–15 (college)

Billy Tohill (April 5, 1939 – April 11, 2000) was an American football player and coach. He served as head coach at Texas Christian University (TCU) from 1971 to 1973.

A native of Batesville, Mississippi, Tohill played at Mississippi State University from 1958 to 1960, where he was awarded letters in 1959 and 1960. He served as an assistant at TCU before taking over as head coach for Jim Pittman, who died midway through the 1971 season. Seventeen months after replacing Pittman, Tohill had a serious automobile accident that nearly killed him and left him with a prosthetic foot. Tohill compiled an 11–15 record overall at TCU. He was fired after the 1973 season. In 1974, Tohill became part of the recruiting team and the coach of the defensive backs for the Birmingham Americans of the World Football League (WFL). One of his final coaching jobs was at Pelham High School in Alabama, where in 1986 he coached the Panthers in their first winning season ever. In 1988, Tohill lead Pelham to a 7–3 season, which was, at the time, the best season the program had ever experienced. In early 1990, Tohill would resign as football coach and athletic director of Pelham High School. Although the reasons were never made clear, it was stated that this move was due to clashes with the school administration. He would go on to be an assistant coach at the University of Alabama at Birmingham in 1991, which was UAB's inaugural football season. Tohill would retire from coaching altogether after the 1991 season at UAB. Tohill lived in Hoover, Alabama until his death in 2000.

Current Clemson University head football coach, Dabo Swinney, played high school football for Tohill at Pelham High School. In 2016 and 2018, Swinney led Clemson to the College Football Playoff National Championship, making Swinney the first former player of Tohill's to win a national title as a head coach.

== Head coaching record ==
=== College ===
Year	Team	Overall	Conference	Standing	Bowl/playoffs
TCU Horned Frogs (Southwest Conference) (1971–1973)
1971	TCU	3–1 (Note: Jim Pittman coached the first seven games of the season before he died on October 30, 1971. Pittman led TCU to an overall record of 3–3–1 with a conference mark of 2–1. TCU finished 6–4–1 overall and 5–2 in conference for the season.)	3–1	3rd	
1972	TCU	5–6	2–5	T–7th	
1973	TCU	3–8	1–6	7th	
TCU:		11–15	6–7		
Total:		11–15			
