= 1971 Arkansas Razorbacks football team =

American college football season

1971 Arkansas Razorbacks football

Liberty Bowl, L 14–13 vs. Tennessee
- Conference: Southwest Conference

Ranking
- Coaches: No. 20
- AP: No. 16
- Record: 8–3–1 (5–1–1 SWC)
- Head coach: Frank Broyles (13th season)
- Offensive coordinator: Don Breaux (2nd season)
- Offensive scheme: Multiple
- Captains: David Hogue; Ronnie Jones; Mike Kelson; Kay Maybry; Bobby Nichols
- Home stadium: Razorback Stadium; War Memorial Stadium

1971 Southwest Conference football standings
	Conf.					Overall
Team	W		L		T	W		L		T
No. 18 Texas $	6	–	1	–	0	8	–	3	–	0
No. 16 Arkansas	5	–	1	–	1	8	–	3	–	1
TCU	5	–	2	–	0	6	–	4	–	1
Texas A&M	4	–	3	–	0	5	–	6	–	0
SMU	3	–	4	–	0	4	–	7	–	0
Rice	2	–	4	–	1	3	–	7	–	1
Texas Tech	2	–	5	–	0	4	–	7	–	0
Baylor	0	–	7	–	0	1	–	9	–	0
$ – Conference champion; Rankings from AP Poll

The 1971 Arkansas Razorbacks football team represented the University of Arkansas in the Southwest Conference (SWC) during the 1971 NCAA University Division football season. In their 14th year under head coach Frank Broyles, the Razorbacks compiled an 8–3–1 record (5–1–1 against SWC opponents), finished in second place behind Texas in the SWC, and outscored all opponents by a combined total of 356 to 169. The team finished the season ranked No. 16 in the final AP poll and No. 20 in the final UPI Coaches Poll and went on to lose the 1971 Liberty Bowl to Tennessee by a 14–13 score.

The Razorbacks assumed the driver's seat for their first trip to the Cotton Bowl Classic since 1965 following a 31–7 rout of archrival Texas in Little Rock, but followed that by losing at home to Texas A&M and tying lowly Rice on the road, allowing the Longhorns to regain the Southwest Conference lead and go on to their fourth consecutive conference championship.

Kicker Bill McClard was an All American. McClard also averaged 6.5 points per game, the seventh best average nationally. Razorback quarterback Joe Ferguson was eighth in the nation in completions per game, with 14.5. Mike Reppond averaged 5.6 receptions per game, the fourth highest average during 1971. As an offense, Arkansas averaged 211.5 yards per game, the highest in the SWC, and eighth-highest in college football. Arkansas was seventh in total offense, with a total of 4898 yards over 11 games.

== Schedule ==
Date	Time	Opponent	Rank	Site	TV	Result	Attendance	Source
September 11	7:30 p.m.	California*	No. 7	War Memorial Stadium; Little Rock, AR		W 51–20	54,176	
September 18		Oklahoma State*	No. 6	War Memorial Stadium; Little Rock, AR		W 31–10	54,176	
September 25		Tulsa*	No. 7	Razorback Stadium; Fayetteville, AR		L 20–21	41,742	
October 2		TCU	No. 18	Razorback Stadium; Fayetteville, AR		W 49–15	41,100	
October 9		at Baylor	No. 17	Baylor Stadium; Waco, TX		W 35–7	33,000	
October 16		No. 10 Texas	No. 16	War Memorial Stadium; Little Rock, AR (rivalry)	ABC	W 31–7	54,446	
October 23	2:00 p.m.	North Texas State*	No. 9	Razorback Stadium; Fayetteville, AR		W 60–21	38,135	
October 30		Texas A&M	No. 8	Razorback Stadium; Fayetteville, AR (rivalry)		L 9–17	54,446	
November 6		at Rice	No. 16	Rice Stadium; Houston, TX		T 24–24	32,000	
November 13		at SMU	No. 17	Cotton Bowl; Dallas, TX	ABC	W 18–13	30,773	
November 20		Texas Tech	No. 17	Razorback Stadium; Fayetteville, AR (rivalry)		W 15–0	43,000	
December 20		vs. No. 9 Tennessee*	No. 18	Memphis Memorial Stadium; Memphis, TN (Liberty Bowl)	ABC	L 13–14	51,410	
*Non-conference game; Rankings from AP Poll released prior to the game; All times are in Central time

== Liberty Bowl ==
	1	2	3	4	Total
#18 Razorbacks	0	7	0	6	13
#9 Volunteers	7	0	0	7	14

The 1971 Liberty Bowl matched up Arkansas with Tennessee. The Volunteers took the lead first, with a two-yard run by Bill Rudder. The Hogs responded with a 36-yard TD strike from Joe Ferguson to Jim Hodge. Scoring wouldn't resume until the fourth quarter, when Razorback Bill McClard kicked 19- and 30-yard field goals. A third McClard kick was good, set up by Louis Campbell's third interception, but a penalty kept the Hogs off the board a fourth time. Arkansas fumbled at their own 36-yard line, and Tennessee's Curt Watson scored three plays later.

Scoring summary

Quarter	Time	Drive			Team	Scoring information	Score	
Quarter	Time	Plays	Yards	TOP	Team	Scoring information	ARK	UT
1	6:39		55		UT	Bill Rudder 2-yard touchdown run, George Hunt kick good	0	7
2	4:11		66		ARK	Jim Hodge 36-yard touchdown reception from Joe Ferguson, Bill McClard kick good	7	7
4	13:14		52		ARK	19-yard field goal by Bill McClard	10	7
4	8:51		30		ARK	30-yard field goal by Bill McClard	13	7
4	1:56		37		UT	Curt Watson 17-yard touchdown run, George Hunt kick good	13	14
"TOP" = time of possession. For other American football terms, see Glossary of American football.							13	14

== Roster ==
1971 Arkansas Razorbacks football team roster
Players
Coaches
Offense

Pos.	#	Name	Class
QB	11	Joe Ferguson	Jr
OT	78	Mike Kelson	Sr
WR	26	Mike Reppond	Jr

Defense

Pos.	#	Name	Class
DT	63	Roger Harnish	Sr
DE	89	Dave Reavis	Jr

Special teams

Pos.	#	Name	Class
K	19	Bill McClard	Sr

Head coach

- Frank Broyles

Coordinators/assistant coaches

Legend

- (C) Team captain
- (S) Suspended
- (I) Ineligible
- Injured
- Redshirt
