= 1971 Tulsa Golden Hurricane football team =

American college football season

1971 Tulsa Golden Hurricane football
- Conference: Missouri Valley Conference
- Record: 4–7 (3–2 MVC)
- Head coach: Claude "Hoot" Gibson (2nd season)
- Home stadium: Skelly Stadium

1971 Missouri Valley Conference football standings
	Conf.					Overall
Team	W		L		T	W		L		T
Memphis State $	4	–	1	–	0	5	–	6	–	0
Louisville	3	–	2	–	0	6	–	3	–	1
Tulsa	3	–	2	–	0	4	–	7	–	0
North Texas State	3	–	2	–	0	3	–	8	–	0
Drake	2	–	3	–	0	7	–	4	–	0
West Texas State	1	–	4	–	0	2	–	9	–	0
Wichita State	0	–	5	–	0	3	–	8	–	0
New Mexico State *	0	–	0	–	0	5	–	5	–	1
$ – Conference champion; * – New Mexico State was ineligible for conference play, but its games against Drake, North Texas State, West Texas State, and Wichita State counted in the conference standings for its opponents. Drake's game against Tampa, Memphis State's games against Cincinnati and Southern Miss, and Tulsa's games against BYU and Virginia Tech were also designated as conference games.

The 1971 Tulsa Golden Hurricane football team represented the University of Tulsa as a member of the Missouri Valley Conference (MVC) during the 1971 NCAA University Division football season. In their second year under head coach Claude "Hoot" Gibson, the Golden Hurricane compiled an overall record of 4–7 with a mark of 3–2 in conference play, placing in a three-way tie for second in the MVC.

The team's statistical leaders included Todd Starks with 1,687 passing yards, Mike Ridley with 311 rushing yards, and Jim Butler with 486 receiving yards.

== Schedule ==
Date	Time	Opponent	Site	Result	Attendance	Source
September 18		Kansas State*	Skelly Stadium; Tulsa, OK	L 10–19	23,500	
September 25		at No. 7 Arkansas*	Razorback Stadium; Fayetteville, AR	W 21–20	41,742	
October 2	8:00 p.m.	at West Texas State	Kimbrough Memorial Stadium; Canyon, TX	W 17–13	15,000	
October 9		Virginia Tech (Note: Designated conference game)	Skelly Stadium; Tulsa, OK	W 46–39	21,500	
October 16		at Wake Forest*	Groves Stadium; Winston–Salem, NC	L 21–51	18,700	
October 23		BYU	Skelly Stadium; Tulsa, OK	L 7–25	11,500	
October 30		at No. 16 Tennessee*	Neyland Stadium; Knoxville, TN	L 3–38	62,517	
November 6	1:30 p.m.	Louisville	Skelly Stadium; Tulsa, OK	L 0–17	14,000	
November 13	1:35 p.m.	Air Force*^{†}	Skelly Stadium; Tulsa, OK	L 7–17	21,000	
November 20		at Florida State*	Doak Campbell Stadium; Tallahassee, FL	L 10–45	20,528	
November 27		at Wichita State	Cessna Stadium; Wichita, KS	W 31–13	7,835	
*Non-conference game; ^{†}Homecoming; Rankings from AP Poll released prior to the game; All times are in Central time

== Roster ==
1971 Tulsa Golden Hurricane football team roster
Players
Coaches
Offense

Pos.	#	Name	Class
OT	74	Jean Barrett	Sr
TE	89	T. C. Blair	So
WR	3	Drew Pearson	Jr
QB	9	Todd Starks

Defense

Pos.	#	Name	Class
LB	90	Dick Blanchard	Sr
LB	94	Steve King	Jr
CB	1	Ralph McGill	Sr
DT	75	Arthur Moore	Jr

Special teams

Pos.	#	Name	Class

Head coach

- Claude "Hoot" Gibson

Coordinators/assistant coaches

Legend

- (C) Team captain
- (S) Suspended
- (I) Ineligible
- Injured
- Redshirt

== After the season ==
=== 1972 NFL draft ===
The following Golden Hurricane players were selected in the 1972 NFL draft following the season.

Round	Pick	Player	Position	NFL club
2	28	Ralph McGill	Defensive back	San Francisco 49ers
2	44	Jean Barrett	Tackle	San Francisco 49ers
10	259	Jim Butler	Tight end	Houston Oilers
16	401	James Shaw	Defensive back	San Diego Chargers
