= Baylor–TCU football rivalry =

American college football rivalry

The Revivalry
- Baylor Bears TCU Horned Frogs
- First meeting: October 24, 1899; Tie, 0–0
- Latest meeting: October 17, 2026; TCU, 17–6
- Next meeting: 2027

Statistics
- Total meetings: 122
- All-time series: TCU leads 61–54–7
- Largest victory: Baylor: 52–0 (1910); TCU: 62–22 (2016)
- Longest win streak: TCU, 8 (1964–1971); Baylor, 8 (1974–1981)
- Current win streak: TCU, 2 (2025–present)

Locations of Baylor and TCU

The Baylor–TCU football rivalry, known as The Bluebonnet Battle and The Revivalry, is an American college football rivalry between the Baylor Bears and TCU Horned Frogs. The first game of this long-standing series was played in 1899, making the rivalry one of the oldest and most played in FBS college football. TCU joined the Big 12 and resumed the annual game with Baylor, which birthed the nickname of "The Revivalry" for a short time. After 122 meetings, the series is the most-played college rivalry in the State of Texas.

== History ==
Baylor was chartered in 1845 by the Republic of Texas and founded as a Baptist institution the same year in Independence, Texas. Baylor permanently moved to Waco forty years later in 1885. TCU was founded in 1873 as AddRan Male and Female College by brothers Addison and Randolph Clark, in Thorp Spring, Texas, and was later renamed AddRan Christian University, relocating to Waco in 1895. AddRan was renamed Texas Christian University in 1902 and relocated again, to Fort Worth, in 1910 after a fire destroyed the school's main administration building. First contested in 1899, and having been played 122 times, the rivalry is one of the oldest and most-played series in college football history. The two schools are presently separated by only 90 miles.

When both schools were located in Waco, the Bears and Horned Frogs frequently faced off multiple times per season. In the early years of the rivalry, TCU and Baylor did not play as conference foes. Like most schools of that era, Baylor was independent until becoming a founding member of the Southwest Conference (SWC) in 1915. TCU subsequently joined the SWC in 1923, after competing as an independent (1896–1913 and 1921–22).

Baylor and TCU would play 69 times as SWC foes, until the SWC disbanded in 1995. Throughout the 70s, 80s, and 90s, the Bears would hold an 18-9 advantage against the Horn Frogs. After a 10-year hiatus, the universities renewed the rivalry in a non-conference series in 2006–2007 and 2010–2011. During this series, TCU competed in the Mountain West Conference. TCU joined Baylor in the Big 12 Conference in 2012, and the rivalry game is now played annually as part of the teams' regular season conference schedules.

In 2014, No. 5 Baylor staged a dramatic comeback to win 61-58 over then No. 9 TCU, scoring 24 unanswered points in the final 10 minutes to overcome a 21-point deficit. The win was secured with a game-winning field goal by Chris Callahan as time expired.

In 2022, Undefeated No. 4 TCU visited Baylor for the 118th edition of the rivalry. In the game TCU's Griffin Kell kicked a game-winning Field goal as time expired, giving TCU a dramatic 29-28 victory over the Bears.

== Rivalry name and trophy ==
On November 13, 2023, in a press conference with TCU and Baylor student government representatives, head coaches, and athletic directors, the two universities formally announced the name of the rivalry would be "The Bluebonnet Battle." The name was the product of a joint student effort between the Baylor and TCU student governments. The name was the product of an effort between the two schools' student bodies and replaced existing unofficial names for the game, despite "The Revivalry" being used by Baylor University in November 2022. The new name was selected to reflect the series becoming the most-played between two teams in the State of Texas in 2023. The Bluebonnet, which is also the state flower of Texas, lines Interstate-35 for parts of the year connecting both schools' campuses.

== Close games and shutouts ==
Football games between Baylor and TCU have been decided by 7 points or less 45 times, including 7 ties.

Several of the Bears and Horned Frogs' meetings since the rivalry's annual renewal in 2010 have featured memorable, close contests. In 2011, Baylor notched a season-opening 50–48 win, with Robert Griffin III, leading a fourth-quarter Baylor drive to set up Aaron Jones' game-winning field goal over the Horned Frogs. In 2014, Baylor came back from a 21-point, fourth quarter deficit by scoring 24 unanswered points to win the game 61–58 with a last second Chris Callahan FG. The outcome of the 2014 matchup and TCU's fourth-quarter collapse was critical in knocking TCU out of the inaugural College Football Playoff; both Baylor and TCU would go on to compile 11–1 (8–1 Big 12) regular season records and ultimately neither team got a Playoff spot as the committee chose 12-1 (and eventual national champion) Ohio State instead. Many have speculated that neither team was chosen because they were co-champions and the Big 12 did not have an actual conference championship at the time (the Big 12 title was awarded to the team with the best conference record). In 2015, the rivalry game was played on Thanksgiving Friday night in Fort Worth, with temperatures in the 30s and pouring rain. After a lightning-delayed start, the high-power spread offenses managed only 14 points apiece in regulation, with TCU securing a 28–21 second-overtime victory with a fourth down stop. In 2019, Baylor outlasted TCU in triple overtime to remain unbeaten. In 2022, undefeated 10–0 TCU won a hard-fought game, 29–28, by lining up to kick a walk-off 40 yard field goal on a running clock. Baylor won in 2024 by a score of 37–34 after kicking a walk-off field goal.

== Other events ==
In 1971, TCU coach Jim Pittman collapsed and died on the sideline in Waco during the rivalry game, the only time in collegiate history that a coach died during a game. The Horned Frogs would go on to win the game 34–27.

In 2025, the rivalry was impacted by severe weather, with three lightning delays in the fourth quarter totaling over two hours. Despite the delays, TCU defeated Baylor with a final score of 42–36.

== Game results ==
Baylor victories	TCU victories	Tie games

No.	Date	Location	Winner	Score
1	October 24, 1899	Waco	Tie	0–0
2	November 23, 1901	Waco	Baylor	39–0
3	November 28, 1901	Waco	Baylor	42–9
4	November 1, 1902	Waco	Tie	0–0
5	November 22, 1902	Waco	Baylor	6–0
6	December 1, 1902	Waco	Baylor	20–0
7	October 3, 1903	Waco	Baylor	12–0
8	November 27, 1903	Waco	Baylor	5–0
9	October 1, 1904	Waco	Tie	0–0
10	November 12, 1904	Waco	Baylor	17–0
11	November 24, 1904	Waco	TCU	5–0
12	September 30, 1905	Waco	TCU	16–0
13	November 11, 1905	Waco	Baylor	10–0
14	November 30, 1905	Waco	TCU	17–0
15	October 5, 1907	Waco	Tie	7–7
16	November 11, 1907	Waco	TCU	11–10
17	November 28, 1907	Waco	Baylor	16–8
18	October 3, 1908	Waco	TCU	15–0
19	October 24, 1908	Waco	TCU	10–6
20	November 26, 1908	Waco	Baylor	23–8
21	October 16, 1909	Waco	TCU	9–0
22	November 6, 1909	Waco	TCU	11–0
23	November 25, 1909	Waco	Baylor	6–3
24	October 24, 1910	Waco	Baylor	52–0
25	November 18, 1910	Fort Worth	Baylor	10–3
26	November 11, 1911	Waco	Baylor	12–0
27	October 19, 1912	Fort Worth	TCU	22–0
28	October 31, 1914	Waco	Baylor	28–14
29	November 25, 1915	Waco	Baylor	51–0
30	November 30, 1916	Fort Worth	Baylor	32–14
31	November 29, 1917	Fort Worth	TCU	34–0
32	November 28, 1918	Waco	TCU	12–7
33	November 27, 1919	Waco	Baylor	7–0
34	November 13, 1920	Waco	TCU	21–9
35	October 13, 1925	Dallas	Tie	7–7
36	October 12, 1926	Waco	Tie	7–7
37	October 29, 1927	Waco	TCU	14–0
38	November 3, 1928	Fort Worth	Baylor	7–6
39	November 23, 1929	Waco	TCU	34–7
40	November 22, 1930	Fort Worth	Baylor	35–14
41	November 21, 1931	Waco	TCU	19–6
42	October 29, 1932	Fort Worth	TCU	27–0
43	November 4, 1933	Waco	Baylor	7–0
44	November 3, 1934	Fort Worth	TCU	34–12
45	November 2, 1935	Waco	TCU	28–0
46	October 31, 1936	Fort Worth	TCU	28–0
47	October 30, 1937	Waco	#6 Baylor	6–0
48	October 29, 1938	Fort Worth	#4 TCU	39–7
49	November 4, 1939	Waco	Baylor	27–0
50	November 2, 1940	Fort Worth	TCU	14–12
51	November 1, 1941	Waco	TCU	23–12
52	October 31, 1942	Fort Worth	Baylor	10–7
53	September 29, 1945	Waco	TCU	7–6
54	September 28, 1946	Fort Worth	TCU	19–16
55	November 1, 1947	Waco	TCU	14–7
56	October 30, 1948	Fort Worth	Baylor	6–3
57	October 29, 1949	Waco	Baylor	40–14
58	November 4, 1950	Fort Worth	Baylor	20–14
59	November 3, 1951	Waco	TCU	20–7
60	November 1, 1952	Fort Worth	Tie	20–20
61	October 31, 1953	Waco	#3 Baylor	25–7
62	October 30, 1954	Fort Worth	Baylor	12–7

No.	Date	Location	Winner	Score
63	October 29, 1955	Waco	TCU	28–6
64	November 3, 1956	Fort Worth	TCU	7–6
65	November 2, 1957	Waco	TCU	19–6
66	November 1, 1958	Fort Worth	TCU	22–0
67	October 31, 1959	Waco	TCU	14–0
68	October 29, 1960	Fort Worth	TCU	14–6
69	November 4, 1961	Waco	Baylor	28–14
70	November 3, 1962	Fort Worth	TCU	28–26
71	November 2, 1963	Waco	Baylor	32–13
72	October 31, 1964	Fort Worth	TCU	17–14
73	October 30, 1965	Waco	TCU	10–7
74	October 30, 1966	Fort Worth	TCU	6–0
75	November 4, 1967	Waco	TCU	29–7
76	November 2, 1968	Fort Worth	TCU	47–14
77	November 1, 1969	Waco	TCU	31–14
78	October 31, 1970	Fort Worth	TCU	24–17
79	October 30, 1971	Waco	TCU	34–27
80	November 4, 1972	Fort Worth	Baylor	42–9
81	November 3, 1973	Waco	TCU	34–28
82	November 3, 1974	Fort Worth	Baylor	21–7
83	November 1, 1975	Waco	Baylor	24–6
84	November 27, 1976	Fort Worth	Baylor	24–19
85	November 26, 1977	Waco	Baylor	48–9
86	October 28, 1978	Fort Worth	Baylor	28–21
87	October 27, 1979	Waco	Baylor	16–3
88	October 25, 1980	Fort Worth	#11 Baylor	21–6
89	October 24, 1981	Waco	Baylor	34–21
90	October 23, 1982	Fort Worth	TCU	38–14
91	October 22, 1983	Waco	Baylor	56–21
92	October 27, 1984	Fort Worth	TCU	38–28
93	October 26, 1985	Waco	#13 Baylor	45–0
94	October 25, 1986	Fort Worth	Baylor	28–17
95	October 25, 1987	Waco	TCU	24–0
96	October 22, 1988	Fort Worth	TCU	24–14
97	October 28, 1989	Waco	Baylor	27–9
98	October 27, 1990	Fort Worth	Baylor	27–21
99	October 26, 1991	Waco	Baylor	26–9
100	October 10, 1992	Fort Worth	Baylor	41–10
101	October 23, 1993	Waco	TCU	38–13
102	October 1, 1994	Fort Worth	Baylor	42–18
103	October 28, 1995	Waco	Baylor	27–24
104	September 3, 2006	Waco	#22 TCU	17–7
105	September 1, 2007	Fort Worth	#22 TCU	27–0
106	September 18, 2010	Fort Worth	#5 TCU	45–10
107	September 2, 2011	Waco	Baylor	50–48
108	October 13, 2012	Waco	#23 TCU	49–21
109	November 30, 2013	Fort Worth	#9 Baylor	41–38
110	October 11, 2014	Waco	#5 Baylor	61–58
111	November 27, 2015	Fort Worth	#19 TCU	28–21^{2OT}
112	November 5, 2016	Waco	TCU	62–22
113	November 24, 2017	Fort Worth	#12 TCU	45–22
114	November 17, 2018	Waco	TCU	16–9
115	November 9, 2019	Fort Worth	#12 Baylor	29–23^{3OT}
116	October 31, 2020	Waco	TCU	33–23
117	November 6, 2021	Fort Worth	TCU	30–28
118	November 19, 2022	Waco	#4 TCU	29–28
119	November 18, 2023	Fort Worth	TCU	42–17
120	November 2, 2024	Waco	Baylor	37–34
121	October 18, 2025	Fort Worth	TCU	42–36
122	October 17, 2026	Waco	TCU	17–6
Series: TCU leads 61–54–7

=== Results by location ===
As of October 17, 2026

City	Games	Baylor victories	TCU victories	Ties	Years played
Waco	74	35	35	5	1899–present
Fort Worth	46	19	26	1	1910–present
Dallas	1	0	0	1	1925

== See also ==
- List of NCAA college football rivalry games
- List of most-played college football series in NCAA Division I
