= Jim Pittman =

American football player and coach (1925–1971)

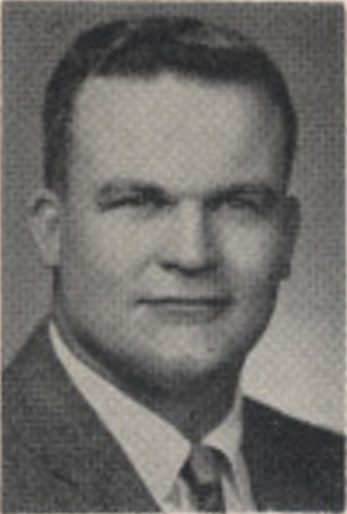
- Pittman, c. 1964

Biographical details
- Born: August 28, 1925; Boyle, Mississippi, U.S.
- Died: October 30, 1971 (aged 46); Waco, Texas, U.S.

Playing career
- 1947–1949: Mississippi State

Coaching career (HC unless noted)
- 1951–1953: Mississippi State (freshmen)
- 1954–1955: Mississippi State (assistant)
- 1956: Washington (assistant)
- 1957–1965: Texas (assistant)
- 1966–1970: Tulane
- 1971: TCU

Head coaching record
- Overall: 24–33–1
- Bowls: 1–0

James Noel Pittman (August 28, 1925 – October 30, 1971) was a college football coach at Tulane University and Texas Christian University.

== Career ==
A native of Boyle, Mississippi, Pittman played at Mississippi State University from 1947 to 1949. From 1966 to 1970, he served as the head football coach at Tulane, and during his tenure there he compiled a 21–30–1 record. In 1971, he served as the head football coach at TCU, where he compiled a 3–3–1 record, being credited for the 34–27 win that happened on the day of his death. He died of a heart attack on the sidelines of a game against Baylor in Waco, Texas on October 30, 1971.

== Head coaching record ==
Year	Team	Overall	Conference	Standing	Bowl/playoffs	Coaches^{#}	AP^{°}
Tulane Green Wave (NCAA University Division independent) (1966–1970)
1966	Tulane	5–4–1					
1967	Tulane	3–7					
1968	Tulane	2–8					
1969	Tulane	3–7					
1970	Tulane	8–4			W Liberty		17
Tulane:		21–30–1					
TCU Horned Frogs (Southwest Conference) (1971)
1971	TCU	3–3–1 (Note: Pittman coached the first seven games of the season before he died on October 30, 1971. Billy Tohill replaced Pitmman as head coach, leading TCU to a 3–1 record over the final four games, all played against conference opponents, of the season. TCU finished the season with a 6–4–1 overall record and placed third with a 5–2 conference mark.)	2–1				
TCU:		3–3–1	2–1				
Total:		24–33–2					
^{#}Rankings from final Coaches Poll.; ^{°}Rankings from final AP Poll.
