= Steve Holden (American football) =

American football player (born 1951)

No. 88, 83
- Position: Wide receiver

Personal information
- Born: August 2, 1951 (age 75); Los Angeles, California, U.S.
- Listed height: 6 ft 0 in (1.83 m)
- Listed weight: 195 lb (88 kg)

Career information
- High school: Gardena (CA)
- College: Arizona State
- NFL draft: 1973: 1st round, 16th overall pick

Career history
- Cleveland Browns (1973–1976); Cincinnati Bengals (1977)

Awards and highlights
- First-team All-American (1972)

Career NFL statistics
- Receptions: 62
- Receiving yards: 927
- Receiving touchdowns: 4
- Stats at Pro Football Reference

Steve Holden (born August 2, 1951) is an American former professional football player who was a wide receiver for the Cleveland Browns of the National Football League (NFL).

== College Stats ==
- 1970: 14 catches for 181 yards and 1 touchdown. 2 carries for 14 yards.
- 1971: 21 catches for 461 yards and 9 touchdowns. 18 carries for 161 yards and 1 touchdown.
- 1972: 38 catches for 848 yards and 12 touchdowns. 14 carries for 112 yards and 1 touchdown.

== See also ==
- List of NCAA major college yearly punt and kickoff return leaders
