= 1971 BYU Cougars football team =

American college football season

1971 BYU Cougars football
- Conference: Western Athletic Conference
- Record: 5–6 (3–4 WAC)
- Head coach: Tommy Hudspeth (8th season)
- Offensive coordinator: Dave Kragthorpe (2nd season)
- Offensive scheme: Single-wing
- Base defense: 5–2
- Home stadium: Cougar Stadium

1971 Western Athletic Conference football standings
	Conf.					Overall
Team	W		L		T	W		L		T
No. 8 Arizona State $	7	–	0	–	0	11	–	1	–	0
New Mexico	5	–	1	–	0	6	–	3	–	2
Arizona	3	–	3	–	0	5	–	6	–	0
BYU	3	–	4	–	0	5	–	6	–	0
Wyoming	3	–	4	–	0	5	–	6	–	0
Utah	3	–	4	–	0	3	–	8	–	0
Colorado State	1	–	4	–	0	3	–	8	–	0
UTEP	1	–	6	–	0	5	–	6	–	0
$ – Conference champion; Rankings from AP Poll

The 1971 BYU Cougars football team was an American football team that represented Brigham Young University (BYU) as a member of the Western Athletic Conference (WAC) during the 1971 NCAA University Division football season. In their eighth and final season under head coach Tommy Hudspeth, the Cougars compiled an overall record of 5–6 with a mark of 3–4 against conference opponents, finished fourth in the WAC, and outscored opponents by a total of 227 to 199.

Pete Van Valkenburg led the team with 602 rushing yards, 684 yards of total offense, and 48 points scored. Other statistical leaders included Bill August with 448 passing yards, Golden Richards with 238 receiving yards, and Dave Atkinson with nine interceptions.

== Schedule ==
Date	Time	Opponent	Site	Result	Attendance	Source
September 10	7:30 p.m.	at North Texas State*	Cotton Bowl; Dallas, TX	W 41–13	13,000	
September 18		Colorado State	Cougar Stadium; Provo, UT	W 54–14	31,087	
September 25		at Kansas State*	KSU Stadium; Manhattan, KS	L 7–23	37,500	
October 1		New Mexico	Cougar Stadium; Provo, UT	L 0–14	25,299	
October 9		at Utah State*	Romney Stadium; Logan, UT (rivalry)	L 7–29	17,015	
October 16		at Wyoming	War Memorial Stadium; Laramie, WY	W 35–17	15,538	
October 23		at Tulsa*	Skelly Field; Tulsa, OK	W 25–7	11,500	
October 30		at UTEP	Sun Bowl; El Paso, TX	W 16–0	12,235	
November 6		at No. 10 Arizona State	Sun Devil Stadium; Tempe, AZ	L 13–38	50,341	
November 13		Arizona^{†}	Cougar Stadium; Provo, UT	L 14–27	27,109	
November 20		Utah	Cougar Stadium; Provo, UT (rivalry)	L 15–17	23,877	
*Non-conference game; ^{†}Homecoming; Rankings from AP Poll released prior to the game; All times are in Mountain time

== Roster ==
1971 BYU Cougars football team roster
Players
Coaches
Offense

Pos.	#	Name	Class
WR	22	Golden Richards	Jr
RB	28	Pete Van Valkenburg	Jr
OL	76	Gordon Gravelle	Sr
OL	78	Paul Howard	Jr
TE	83	Dennis Poppinga	Sr

Defense

Pos.	#	Name	Class
LB	32	Ron Tree	Jr
LB	37	Jeff Lyman	Sr
LB	82	Bill Dvorak	Sr
DE	84	Joe Liljenquist	Sr

Special teams

Pos.	#	Name	Class

Head coach

- Tommy Hudspeth

Coordinators/assistant coaches

Legend

- (C) Team captain
- (S) Suspended
- (I) Ineligible
- Injured
- Redshirt

Roster
